= East Lancs Myllennium =

Type of single-decker bus body

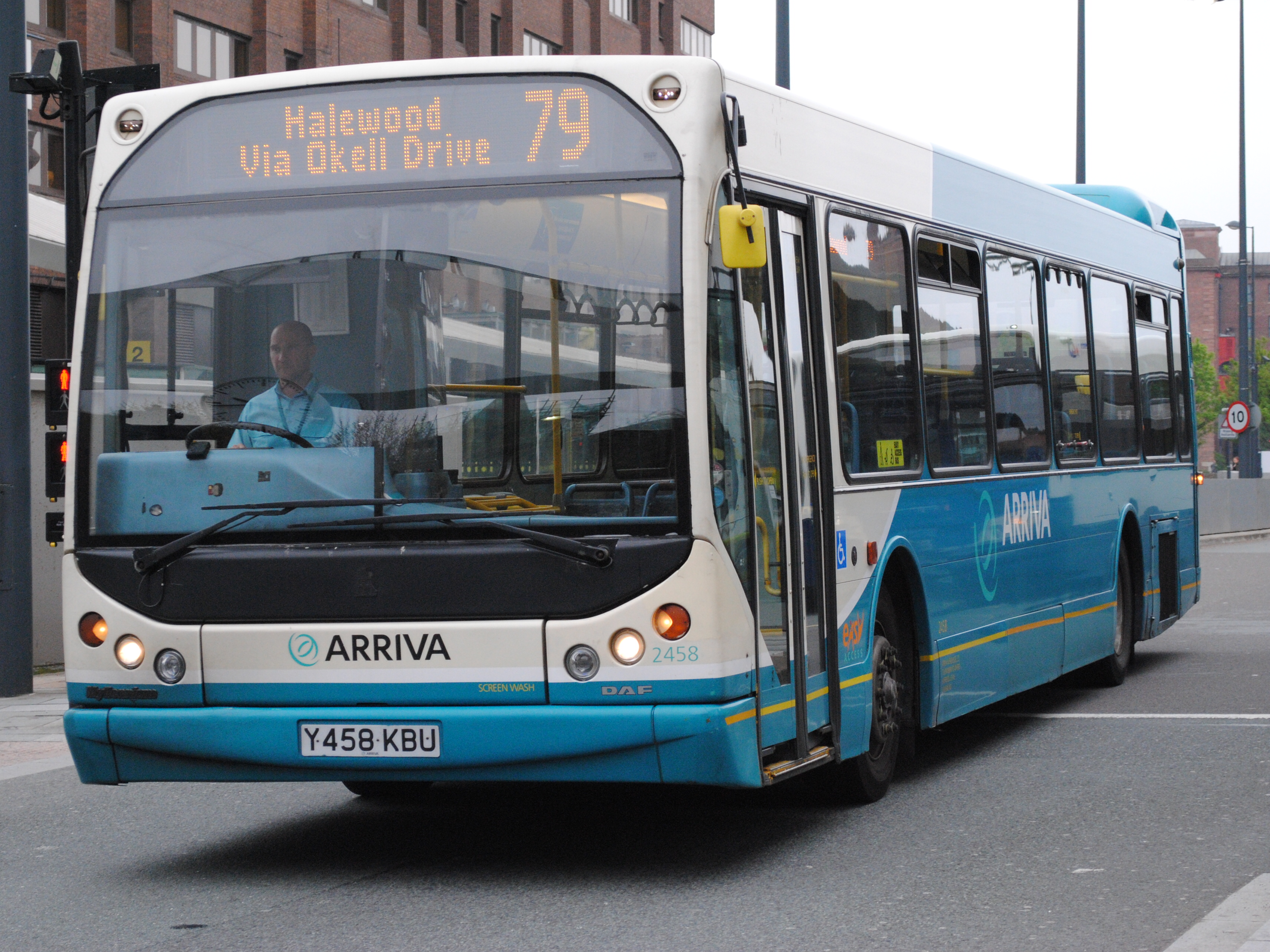
- Arriva North West East Lancs Myllennium bodied DAF SB220 in Liverpool in May 2013.

Overview
- Manufacturer: East Lancashire Coachbuilders
- Production: 1999 - 2006
- Assembly: Blackburn, Lancashire, England
- Designer: John Worker

Body and chassis
- Doors: 1 or 2
- Floor type: Low floor High-floor
- Chassis: DAF SB220; Dennis Dart SLF; MAN 14.220; Scania N94UB (Omnitown)
- Related: East Lancs Myllennium Lolyne; East Lancs Myllennium Lowlander; East Lancs Myllennium Nordic; East Lancs Myllennium Vyking

Powertrain
- Engine: DAF GS160M (DAF SB220); Cummins B Series/ISBe (Dennis Dart SLF); MAN (MAN 14.220); Scania DC09 (Scania N94UB)
- Transmission: Voith, ZF, Allison

Dimensions
- Length: 8.5 m (27 ft 11 in) – 13.9 m (45 ft 7 in); 11 m (36 ft 1 in) – 12 m (39 ft 4 in) (Hyline)
- Width: 2.3 m (7 ft 7 in) – 2.53 m (8 ft 4 in)
- Height: 3.1 m (10 ft 2 in); 3.41 m (11 ft 2 in) (Hyline); 3.0 m (9 ft 10 in) (Omnitown)

Chronology
- Successor: East Lancs Esteem

The East Lancs Myllennium was a type of single-decker bus body manufactured by East Lancashire Coachbuilders on DAF SB220, Dennis Dart SLF, MAN 14.220 and Scania N94UB chassis. It was superseded by the East Lancs Esteem in 2006.

== Operators ==
=== United Kingdom ===
The Myllenium was first designed in co-operation between East Lancs designer John Worker and the London Central bus company in 1999 for use on Millennium Dome shuttle services M1 and M2, with 17 in total on DAF SB220 chassis delivered for the services, three of which were LPG gas-powered. The buses were equipped with air conditioning and an electronic guidance system designed by Alstom for driverless running on a 0.8 miles (1.3 km) section of guided busway linking the Millennium Dome with Charlton and Greenwich railway stations. The buses never ran in passenger-carrying service on the M1 service using the guidance system, and London Buses later admitted in 2000 that the guidance system was not yet ready for deployment on the planned 'Millennium Busway'. The Myllenniums were eventually downgraded to regular service buses for use on London Buses route 486, the M1's successor, which commenced operations from 24 February 2001.

Soon after, the Myllennium became available for other operators, with the majority of orders coming from Arriva North West, First Berkshire & The Thames Valley, and the Traction Group. 22 were bought between 2005 and 2007 by Surrey County Council for contract use, initially for school contracts before moving onto park and ride routes. Enterprise had also bought two for contract use with Red Funnel in 2005, with them being handed down to Go South Coast division Bluestar once the contract with them was finished.

In line with previous East Lancs products, the Myllennium bodywork was also used to body less standard buses than public service vehicles. Notable examples include twelve Myllenniums modified as outside broadcasting vehicles that were delivered to various regional BBC Radio stations across the United Kingdom; fitted out by convertor Keillor Coachbuilders, a satellite broadcasting studio is located behind the driver's cab, while equipment such as six PCs, a digital TV and radio, a printer, scanner and DVD player were situated in the main saloon area.

=== Guernsey ===
The States of Guernsey took delivery of 33 2.4 metres (7 ft 10 in) wide East Lancs Myllennium bodied Dennis Dart SLFs throughout 2003 to replace the island's existing bus fleet, delivered in a new green and yellow livery for lease to local operator Island Coachways. These were later phased out in 2018 by CT Plus' buses.gg operation with the delivery of new Wright StreetVibes.

== Hyline ==
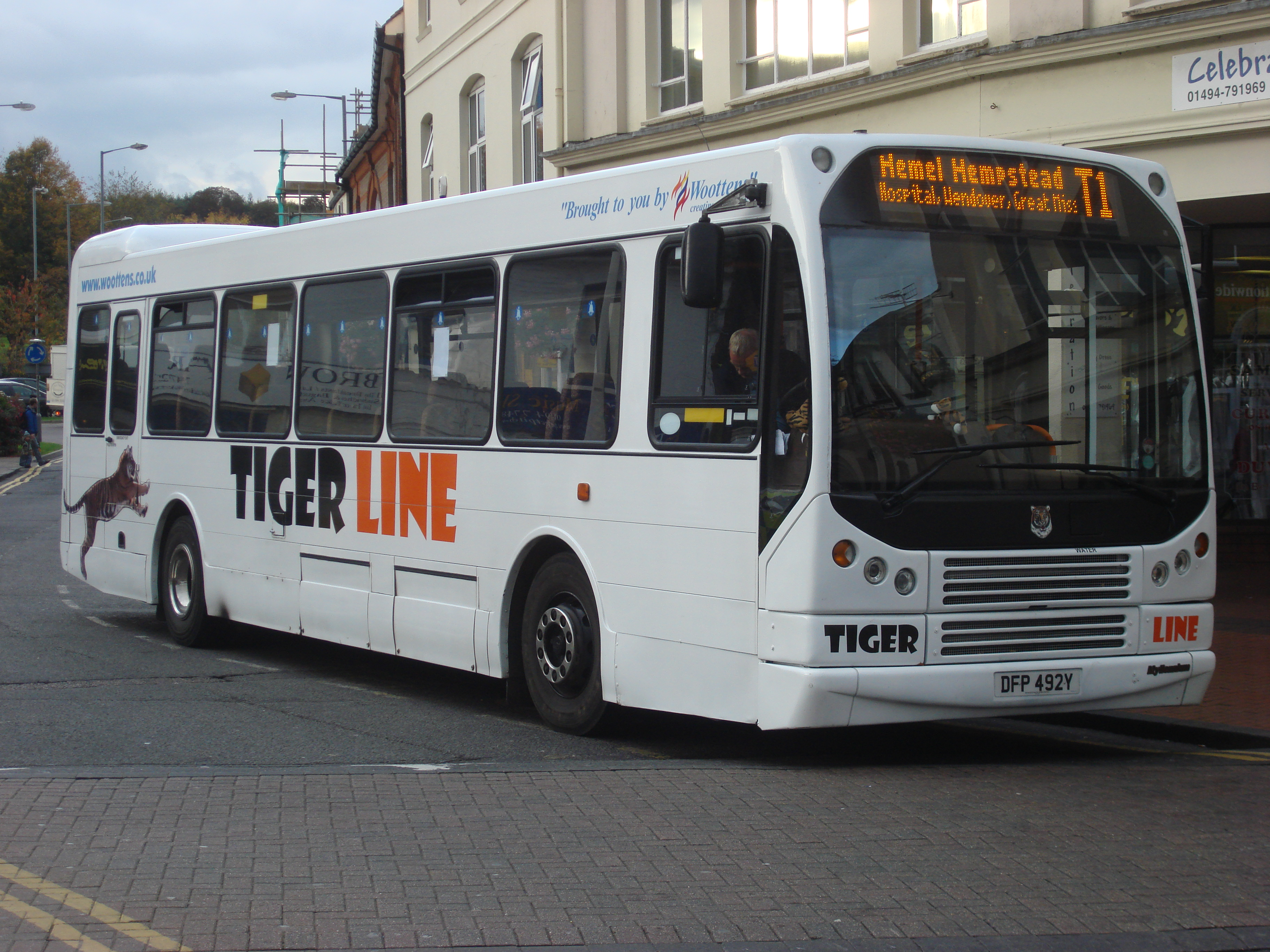
Tiger Line Myllennium Hyline bodied Leyland Tiger in Chesham in October 2008

The Myllennium Hyline high-floor body was developed in 2000 in partnership between East Lancs and Fleetmaster Bus & Coach of Horsham as a body based on the Myllennium design, suitable for reconditioned Leyland Tiger or Volvo B10M chassis. A chassis with a Hyline rebody was capable of seating between 47 and 67 passengers.

Six refurbished Leyland Tigers were given Hyline bodies for Strathtay Scottish, while two were built on the Volvo B10M chassis for Jones of Login and Bagnall's of Swadlincote, these differing from the Tiger bodies by being built with bonded glazing and an emergency exit located at the rear offside. The concept was not a great success and after no further orders followed, the Hyline body was discontinued in 2002, (Note: December 2002 was the last time the Hyline body was advertised for purchase on the East Lancs website.) representing the end of rebodying for the bus industry in the United Kingdom.

== Gallery ==
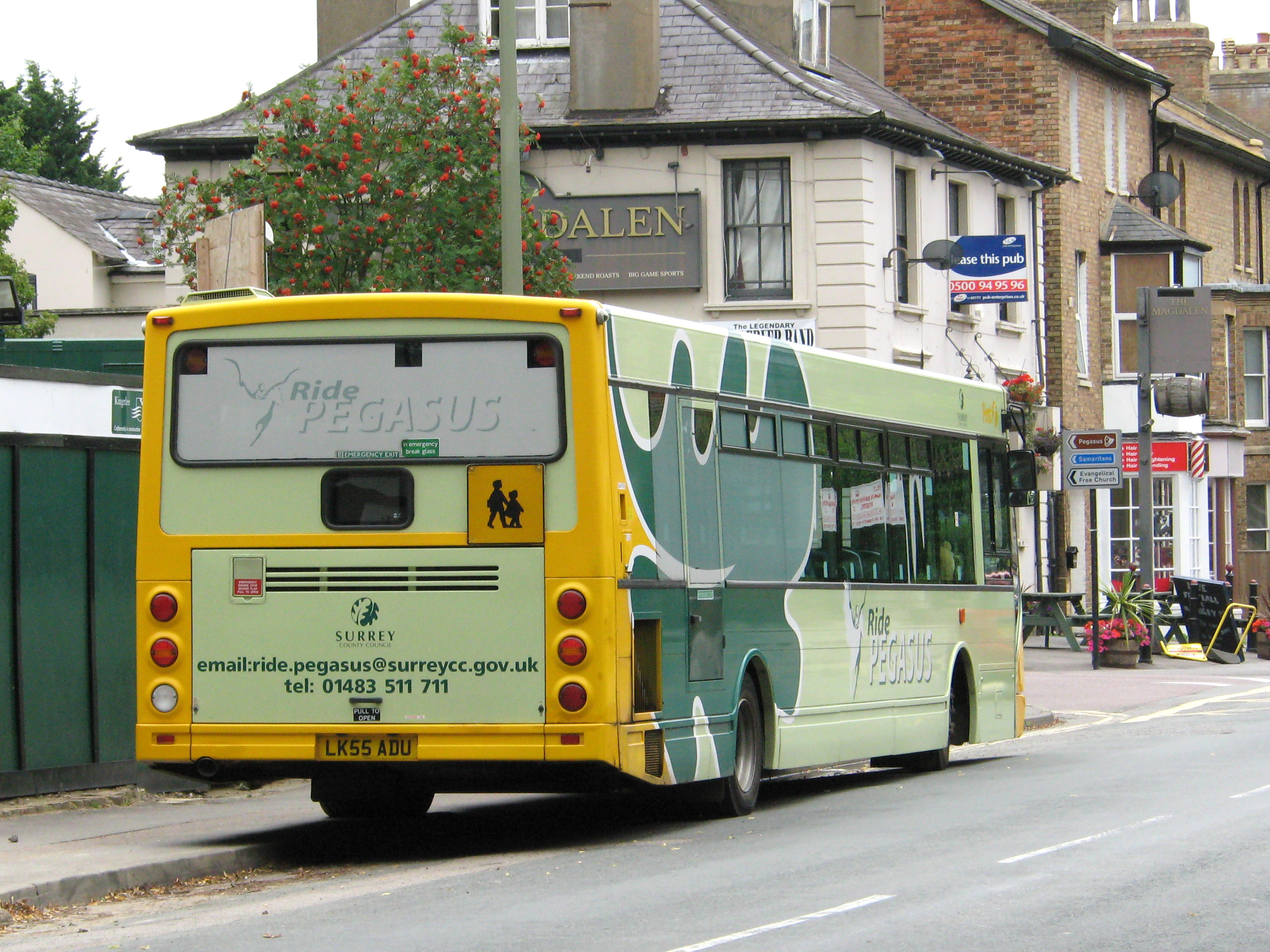
First Berkshire & The Thames Valley Myllennium rear in Oxford in 2009

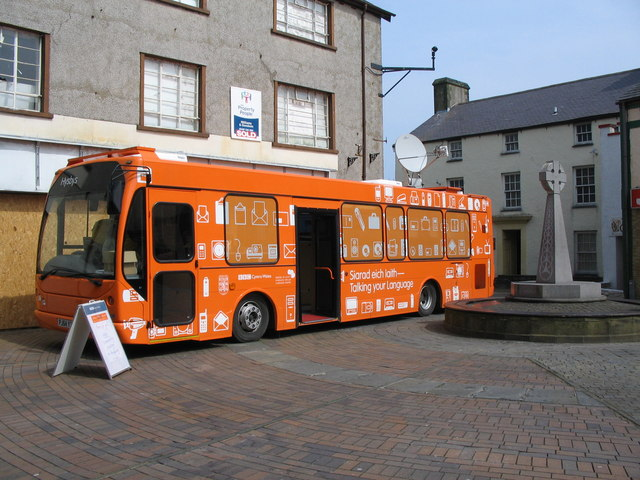
Myllennium bodied MAN as a BBC Radio mobile studio in Holyhead in April 2006

== See also ==
- List of buses
