= East Lancs Myllennium Lowlander =

Double-decker bus body built on the DAF/VDL DB250 chassis

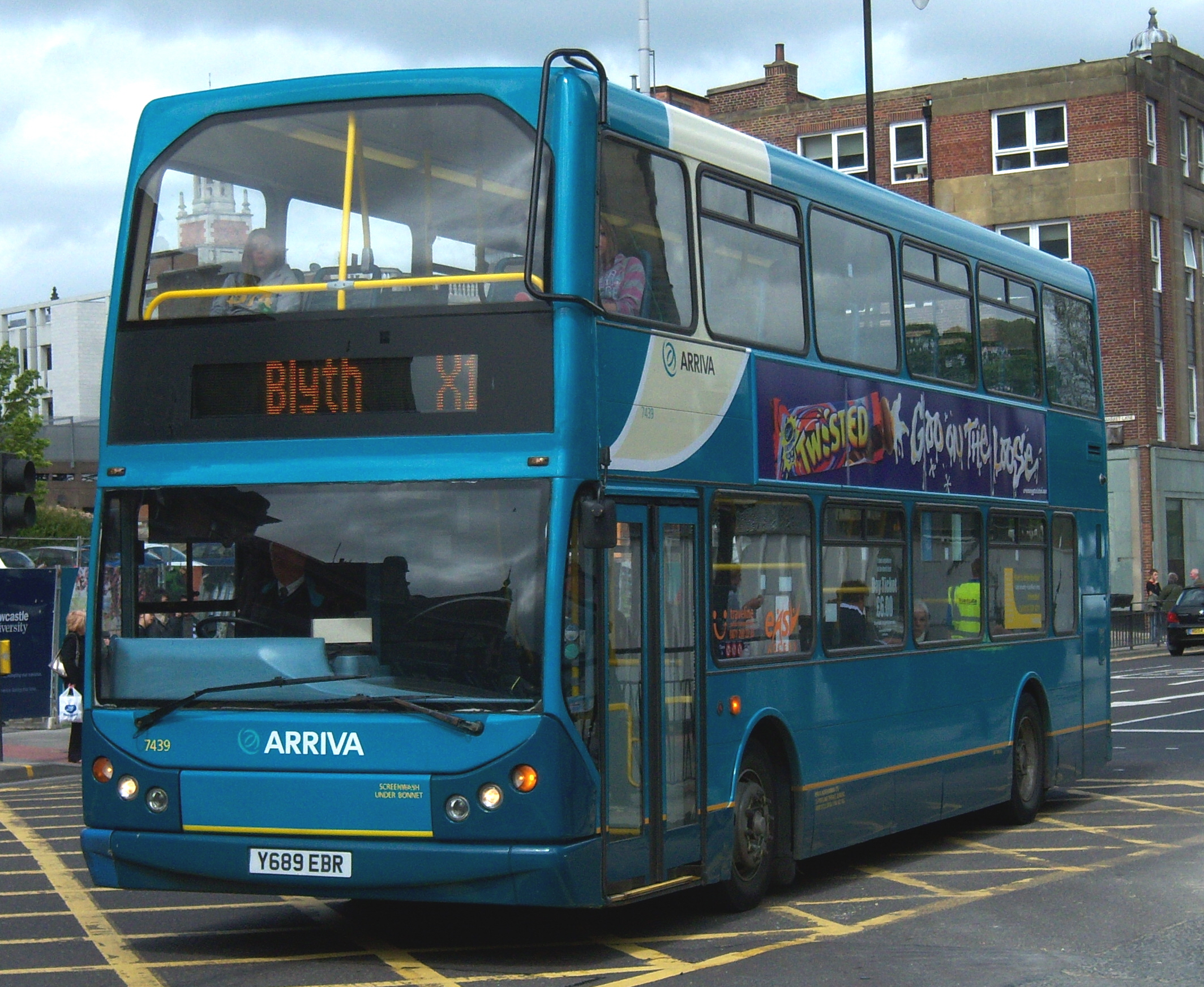
- Arriva North East Myllennium Lowlander bodied DAF DB250LF in Newcastle upon Tyne in 2009

Overview
- Manufacturer: East Lancashire Coachbuilders
- Production: 2001-2007

Body and chassis
- Doors: 1 door
- Floor type: Low floor
- Chassis: DAF/VDL DB250
- Related: East Lancs Myllennium; East Lancs Myllennium Lolyne; East Lancs Myllennium Vyking

Powertrain
- Capacity: 76 plus standees

Dimensions
- Length: 10,000 to 10,700mm
- Width: 2535mm
- Height: 4,195 to 4,330mm

The East Lancs Myllennium Lowlander (or simply referred to as the East Lancs Lowlander) is the type of double-decker bus body built on the DAF/VDL DB250 chassis by East Lancashire Coachbuilders. The name "Lowlander" was derived from the chassis being built by a company from The Netherlands.

== History ==
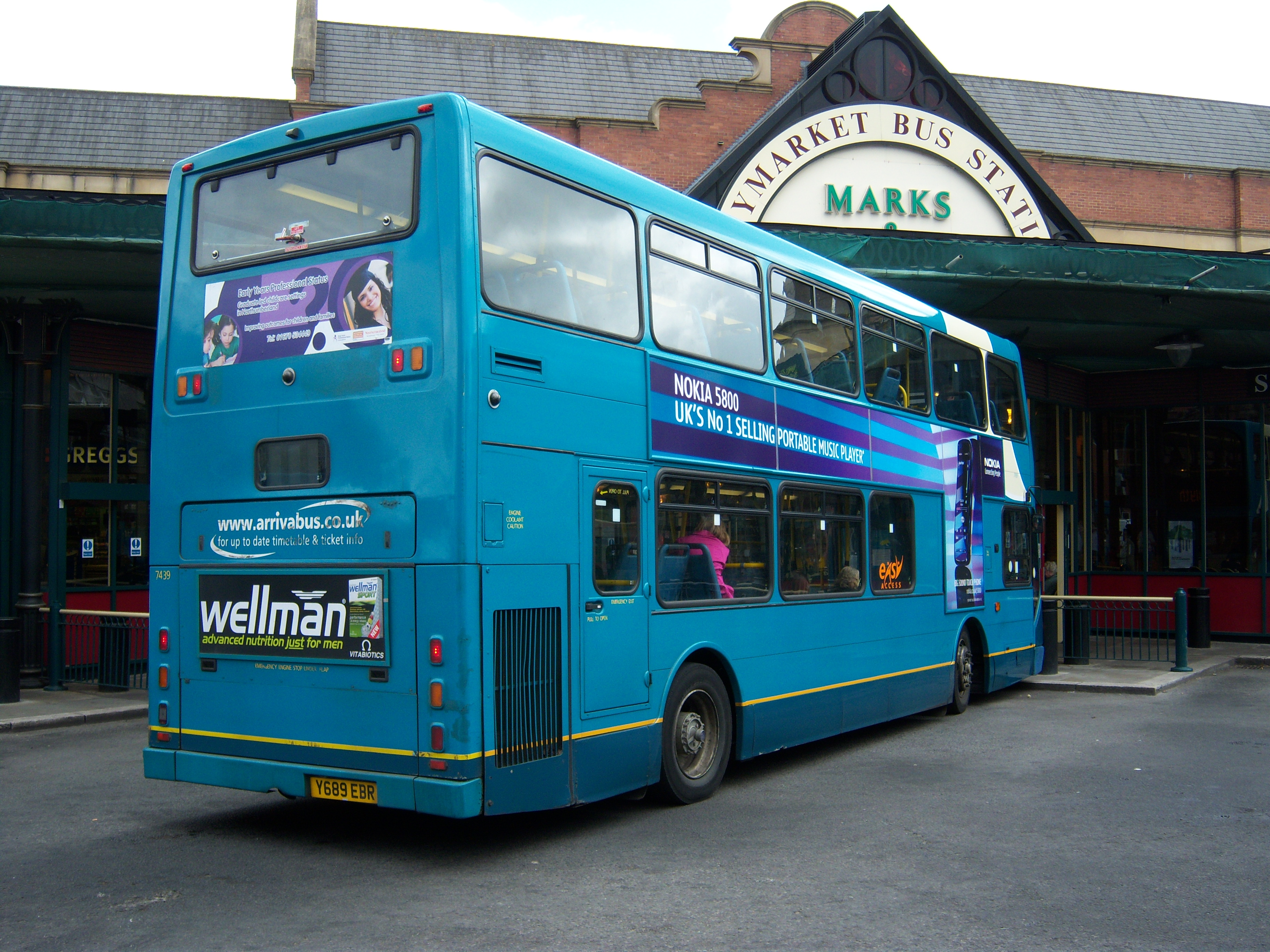
Arriva North East East Lancs Myllennium Lowlander rear in Newcastle in May 2009

The Myllennium Lowlander superseded the old style East Lancs Lowlander, which was never released in the original design due to no orders being placed, therefore no examples of the previous model were built. East Lancs decided to retain the Lolyne/Myllennium Lolyne name for their bodies for Dennis Trident 2s rather than change the name to Lowlander, as they felt the name's association with The Netherlands would make it a fitting name for their body for the DAF DB250. It was eventually released in 2001, only ever being sold with East Lancs' "Myllennium" design. This is what has resulted in the Myllennium Lowlander, its new name, also being informally referred to as simply the Lowlander.

== See also ==
- List of buses
