= East Lancashire Coachbuilders =

Bus bodywork manufacturer based in Blackburn, England

East Lancashire Coachbuilders Ltd.
- Company type: Private
- Industry: Bus building
- Founded: 27 October 1934; 91 years ago
- Founder: Walter Smith
- Defunct: 1 March 2010
- Fate: Dissolved after parent company Darwen Group performed a reverse takeover
- Successor: Optare
- Headquarters: Blackburn, Lancashire, England
- Products: Bus bodies
- Website: Official website

East Lancashire Coachbuilders Limited was a manufacturer of bus bodies and carriages founded in 1934 in Blackburn, Lancashire, England. The company went into administration for a short while in August 2007, before being bought by Darwen Group and performed a reverse takeover with Optare when its parent purchased the company in 2008 and its site and business was later closed in 2012.

== History ==
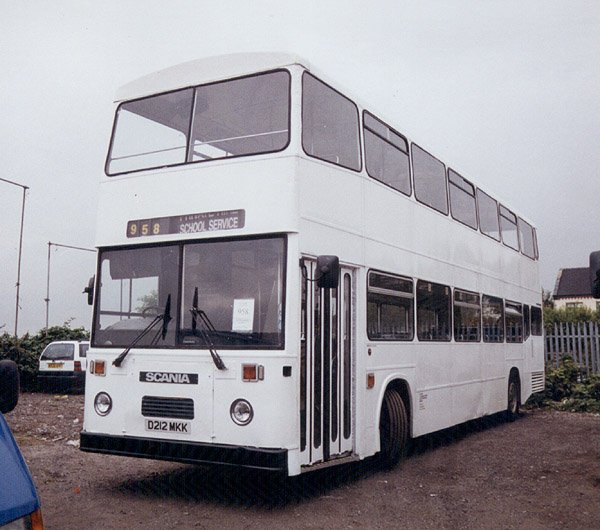
1987 high-capacity East Lancs body on Scania K92 chassis: one of the last built to this flat-fronted style

East Lancashire Coachbuilders was first founded by Walter Smith at Brookhouse Mill in Blackburn in 1934. The company would change hands multiple times after Smith's death between the 1960s and 1980s, eventually being sold to the Drawlane Transport Group (later renamed British Bus) in 1988. By 1994, the company had expanded into new premises on the Whitebirk Industrial Estate and commenced a programme of development that resulted in a range of single and double deck buses, which was the primary source of income for the company.

In August 1996, British Bus was purchased by the Cowie Group, with all orders by British Bus companies for buses bodied by East Lancashire Coachbuilders subsequently cancelled at short notice by Cowie. The company avoided entering administration with both the intervention of Blackburn Member of Parliament Jack Straw as well as chassis manufacturer Dennis Specialist Vehicles supplying ten of their bus chassis for bodying, with payment for buying the chassis deferred until the buses were bodied and sold to operators.

On 17 August 2007, East Lancashire Coachbuilders went into administration, however it would bought out from administration by the Darwen Group the next day. It was claimed by ELCB's sales director John Horn that entering administration was a direct consequence of a changeover to building on Euro IV chassis, as well as a delay in the certification of East Lancs double-decker bodies on Scania chassis intended for London as a result of failing the tilt test; a package of 17 redundancies followed in November 2006 as a result of overall low turnover. After the purchase, the Darwen Group rebranded the company as Darwen East Lancs. Speculation was raised that bus building could potentially move to Newcastle upon Tyne, where the Darwen Group was based, however it was confirmed in November 2007 that East Lancs would stay in Blackburn with a move to a new manufacturing site on the Walker Business Park.

In 2008, Jamesstan Investments, an investment company controlled by the Darwen Group, purchased another bus manufacturer, Optare. Later, in June 2008, a £15.95 million reverse takeover was performed, with the Darwen name - and as a result, the East Lancs name - disappearing in favour of Optare. Production of all the original East Lancs bodies by Optare ceased by 2011, and the premises in Blackburn closed on 31 March 2012.

== Products ==
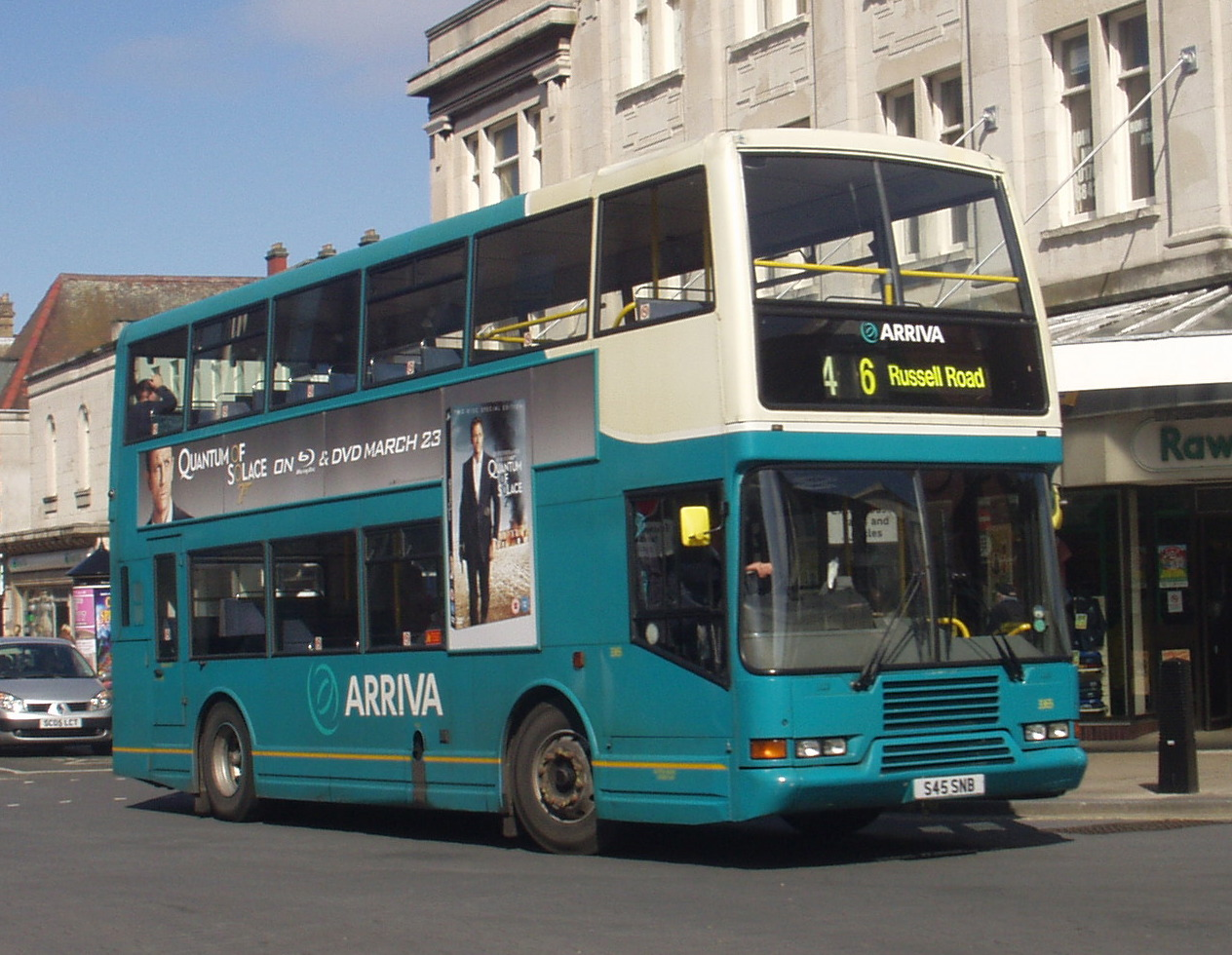
East Lancs Pyoneer bodied Volvo Olympian in 2009; these buses were also the last ever step-entrance double decker bus design to be produced when they were introduced in 1997.

East Lancs has had many different styles of bodywork. They had a tradition of using cacography, mostly replacing a letter i with a letter y, which continued until the Esteem and Olympus series.

- Greenway
- EL2000 predecessor to the Flyte
- Cityzen predecessor to the OmniDekka
- Pyoneer predecessor to the Lolyne

=== Low floor buses ===
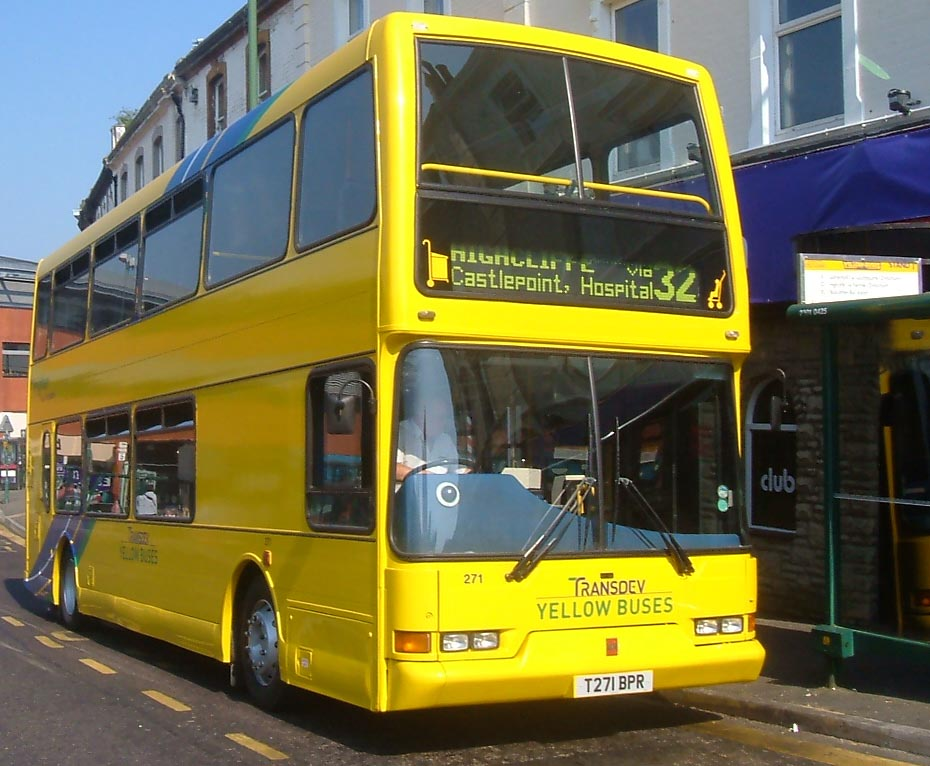
Lolyne run by Transdev Yellow Buses

In the early 1990s, East Lancs developed buses for the low floor market with the style of the body being based on the former East Lancs Pyoneer.

- Lolyne for Dennis Trident chassis.
- Vyking for Volvo B7TL chassis.
- Nordic for tri-axle Volvo B7L chassis.
- Spryte for Dennis Dart and Volvo B6BLE chassis
  - Flyte - Step entrance variant that superseded the EL2000 on Scania, Volvo and Kirin chassis as well as Leyland Tiger rebodying.

==== Myllennium Facelift ====
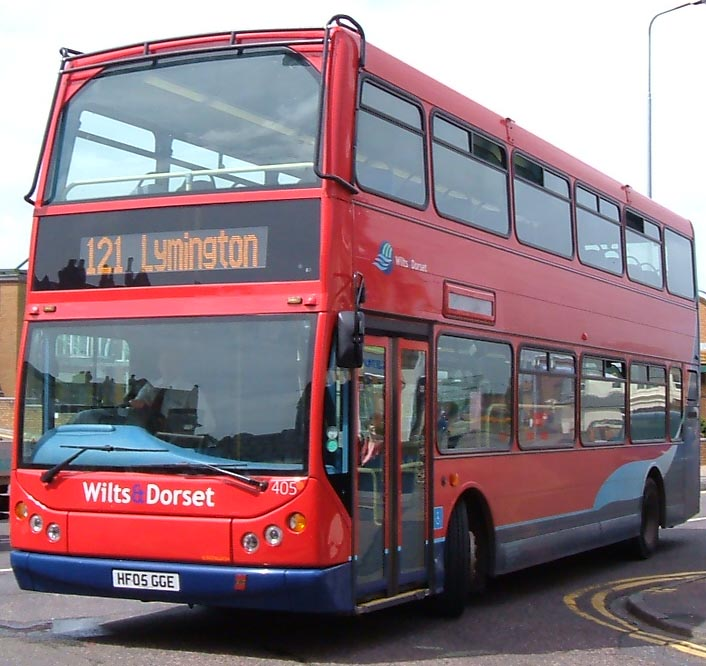
Myllennium Vyking owned by Wilts & Dorset

In 1999, the buses received a front and interior overhaul with the style of the body being based on the new East Lancs Myllennium that was launched for the Millennium Dome routes.

- Myllennium Lolyne with Dennis Trident chassis
- Myllennium Vyking with Volvo B7TL chassis
- Myllennium Lowlander with DAF/VDL DB250LF chassis
- Myllennium Nordic for 3-axle Volvo B9TL
- Myllennium for DAF SB220, MAN 14.220, Scania N94UB and Alexander Dennis Dart
  - Hyline, a high-floor variant used to re-body Leyland Tiger buses.

==== Kinetec ====
The Kinetec was launched at the Euro Bus Expo 2006. They are designed as low-floor bodies for MAN chassis. They have the Esteem/Olympus body but with MAN's own Lion's City design front and rear. A double decker based on the Kinetec was built called the Kinetec+; however, it was a one-off order, and Kinetec buses were phased out with the new acquisition by Darwen Group in 2008.

=== Scania and Esteem product range ===
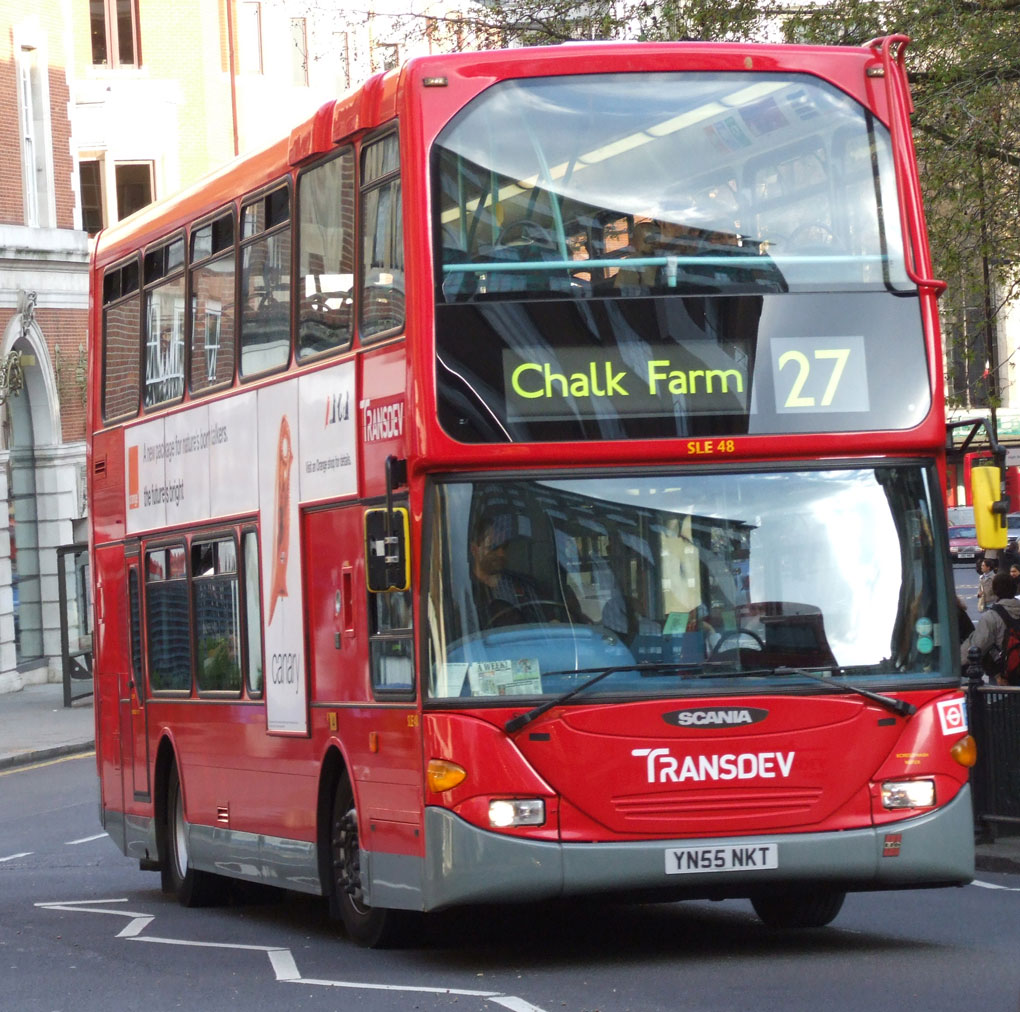
Scania OmniDekka in London, run by Transdev London

These buses are the last surviving variants of the original low floor series which became part of their own series. The Scania product range used the Myllennium styling but with Scania own front styling. Whereas the Esteem products used an original front, which developed into a new body entirely.

The Scania products were launched in 2004; however, the OmniTown was not as well received as the company hoped and was discontinued after Darwen took over ownership.

- OmniTown for Scania N94UB chassis
- OmniDekka for Scania N94UD/N230UD/N270UD chassis

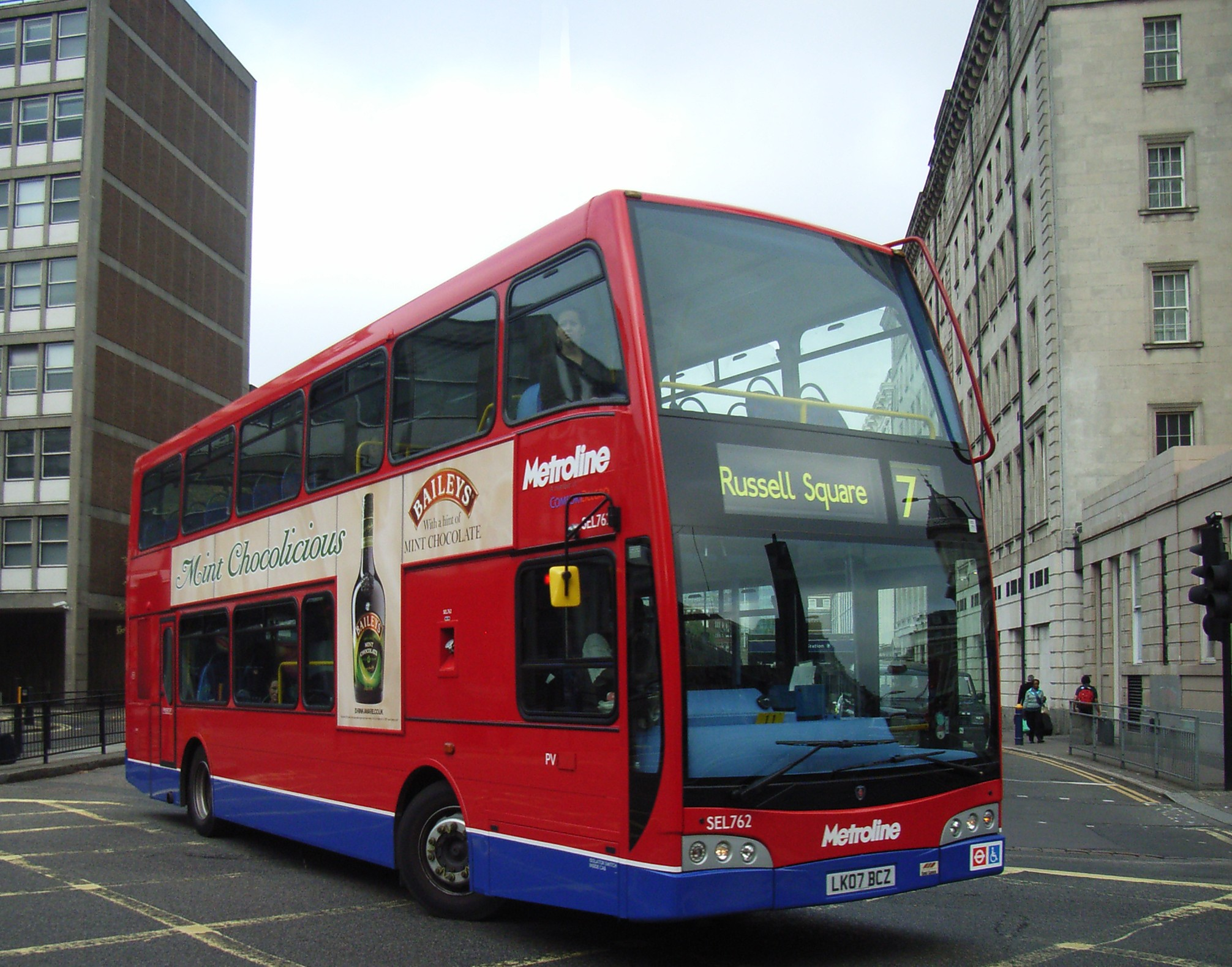
East Lancs Olympus, one of the last East Lancs badged products, this one run by Metroline

Both the Esteem and the Olympus (its double decker variant) were launched in 2006. An open top version of the Olympus, named East Lancs Visionaire was launched in summer 2007 with Arriva's The Original Tour.

- Esteem for Alexander Dennis Enviro200 Dart, MAN 12.240, Scania N230UB, Scania N94UB and Alexander Dennis Enviro300 chassis
- Olympus for Alexander Dennis Enviro400, VDL DB250, Volvo B9TL and Scania N230UD chassis
- Visionaire open-top body for Volvo B9TL chassis

Production of these buses continued under Darwen ownership.

== Related companies ==
British City Bus was the parent company that owned East Lancashire Coachbuilders. The company was dissolved after Darwen Group rescued East Lancs from administration in 2007.

East Lancs Overseas was a subsidiary of East Lancashire Coachbuilders in charge of taking orders and exporting buses. It was dissolved after Darwen Group rescued East Lancs from administration in 2007. Darwen North West was a vehicle repair business in Blackburn, England, offering coach refurbishment, repair, maintenance, and conversion services. It was originally a subsidiary of the bus manufacturer, called North West Bus & Coach Repairs which was renamed to Darwen North West after the acquisition of assets by Darwen Group. It was later dissolved in 2013.

Logo of British City Bus

Logo of East Lancs Overseas

Logo of Darwen North West (Formally North West Bus & Coach Repairs)
