= East Lancs Nordic =

Low-floor double-decker tri-axle bus on Volvo B7L chassis

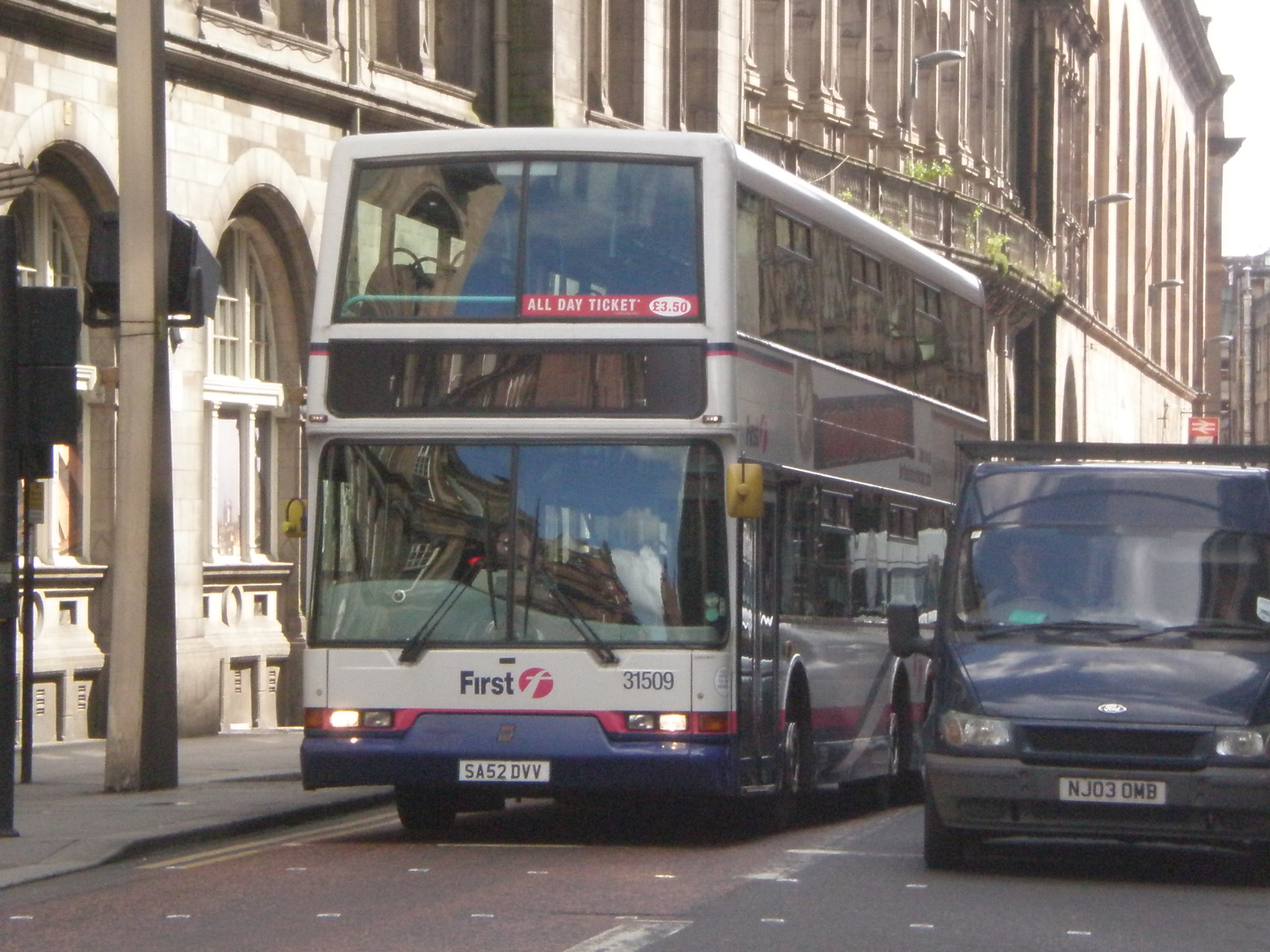
- First Glasgow Nordic bodied Volvo B7L in May 2009

Overview
- Manufacturer: East Lancashire Coachbuilders
- Production: 2000–2006

Body and chassis
- Doors: 1/2/3 (depending on the order)
- Floor type: Low floor
- Chassis: Volvo B7L

Powertrain
- Engine: Volvo D7C
- Capacity: up to 95 seats
- Transmission: ZF Ecomat

Dimensions
- Length: 12 m (39 ft 4 in)
- Width: 2.5 m (8 ft 2 in)
- Height: 4.2 m (13 ft 9 in)

Chronology
- Successor: East Lancs Myllennium Nordic

The East Lancs Nordic is a type of low-floor double-decker bus body built by East Lancashire Coachbuilders. It was built on tri-axle double-decker Volvo B7L chassis, with a length of 12 metres and a seating capacity of up to 95 passengers. The Nordic body design is based on an elongated version of the East Lancs Vyking body, with the name "Nordic" being derived from the chassis being built by a company from Sweden. The bus was later superseded by its Myllennium counterpart in 2005.

== Operations ==
=== United Kingdom ===
First Glasgow were the only operator in the United Kingdom to purchase Nordics, taking delivery of ten examples in October and November 2002. These Nordics were replaced in 2009 by a batch of Alexander Dennis Enviro500s, and all ten Nordics were sold by First Glasgow, one to Tyrers Coaches and nine to BrightBus of Rotherham; however, one Nordic was destroyed by fire shortly after its arrival at BrightBus and was stripped for spares.

=== Denmark ===
The body was also sold outside of the UK, predominantly to operators in Denmark. 22 East Lancs Nordic bodied Volvo B7Ls were delivered to City-Trafik between 2000 and 2001, with an additional 14 delivered to Arriva Danmark over the same period. All would be withdrawn from service by 2018, with many being converted to open-toppers and exported worldwide for use as sightseeing buses; the final Nordic left in original condition was purchased from Movia by the Skjoldenæsholm Tram Museum and restored to original livery.

=== Elsewhere ===
Seven of the former Arriva Denmark Noridcs were purchased by bus dealer Ensignbus after their withdrawal and, following conversion to open-top format, were sold on to open-top sightseeing operator Big Bus Company use on tourist sightseeing services in Washington, D.C., while others were also retained in Denmark for use on local sightseeing services.

== Myllennium Nordic ==
East Lancs Myllennium Nordic
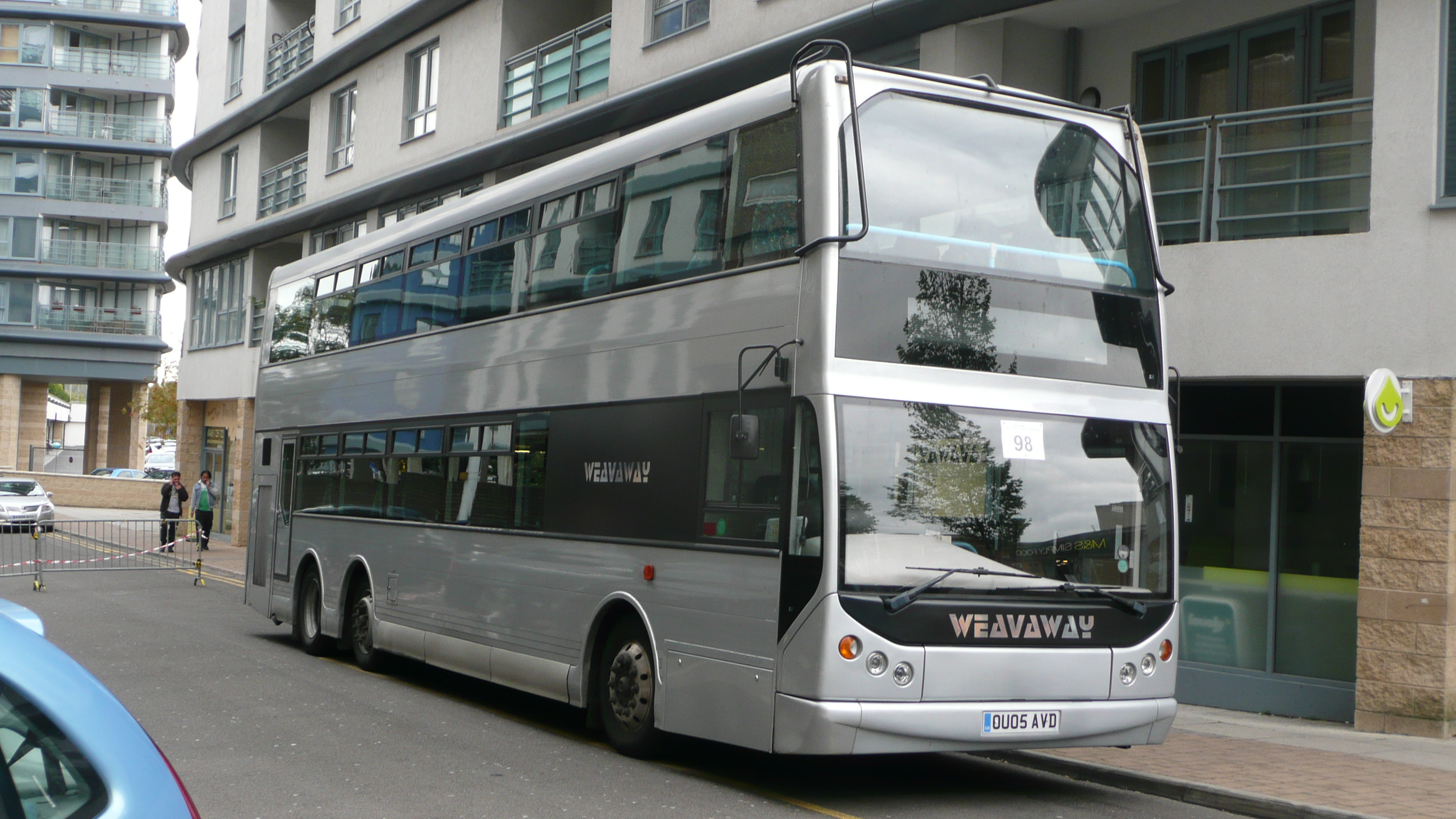
- Weavaway Travel Myllennium Nordic bodied Volvo B9TL in October 2009

Overview
- Manufacturer: East Lancashire Coachbuilders
- Production: 2005–2006

Body and chassis
- Doors: 1 door
- Floor type: Low floor
- Chassis: Volvo B9TL

Powertrain
- Engine: Volvo D9A
- Capacity: up to 102 seats
- Transmission: ZF Ecomat

Dimensions
- Length: 12 m (39 ft 4 in)
- Width: 2.5 m (8 ft 2 in)
- Height: 4.2 m (13 ft 9 in)

Chronology
- Successor: East Lancs Olympus

The East Lancs Myllennium Nordic is a type of low-floor double-decker bus body built by East Lancashire Coachbuilders. It was built on tri-axle double-decker Volvo B9TL chassis, with a length of 12 metres and a seating capacity of 102 passengers. The Myllennium Nordic body design is based on an elongated version of the East Lancs Myllennium Vyking body, with the name "Nordic" being derived from the chassis being built by a company from Sweden. The Myllennium Nordic was introduced in 2005 as the replacement for the East Lancs Nordic; following poor sales, the Myllennium Nordic was later replaced by the introduction of a tri-axle variant of the Olympus.

Weavaway Travel of Newbury were the largest customer for the Myllennium Nordic, taking delivery of the first six examples to be built in April and May 2005. Further examples were later purchased Roadliner of Poole and Provence Private Hire of St Albans.

Although they did not purchase any Myllennium Nordics from new, Sanders Coaches of North Norfolk for a while operated the majority of Myllennium Nordics built for the UK, having acquired them second-hand. Lucketts Travel of Fareham now operates the majority in its 'Mortons' livery, including two bought from Sanders Coaches.
