= Delaine Buses =

Bus operator based in Bourne, Lincolnshire, England

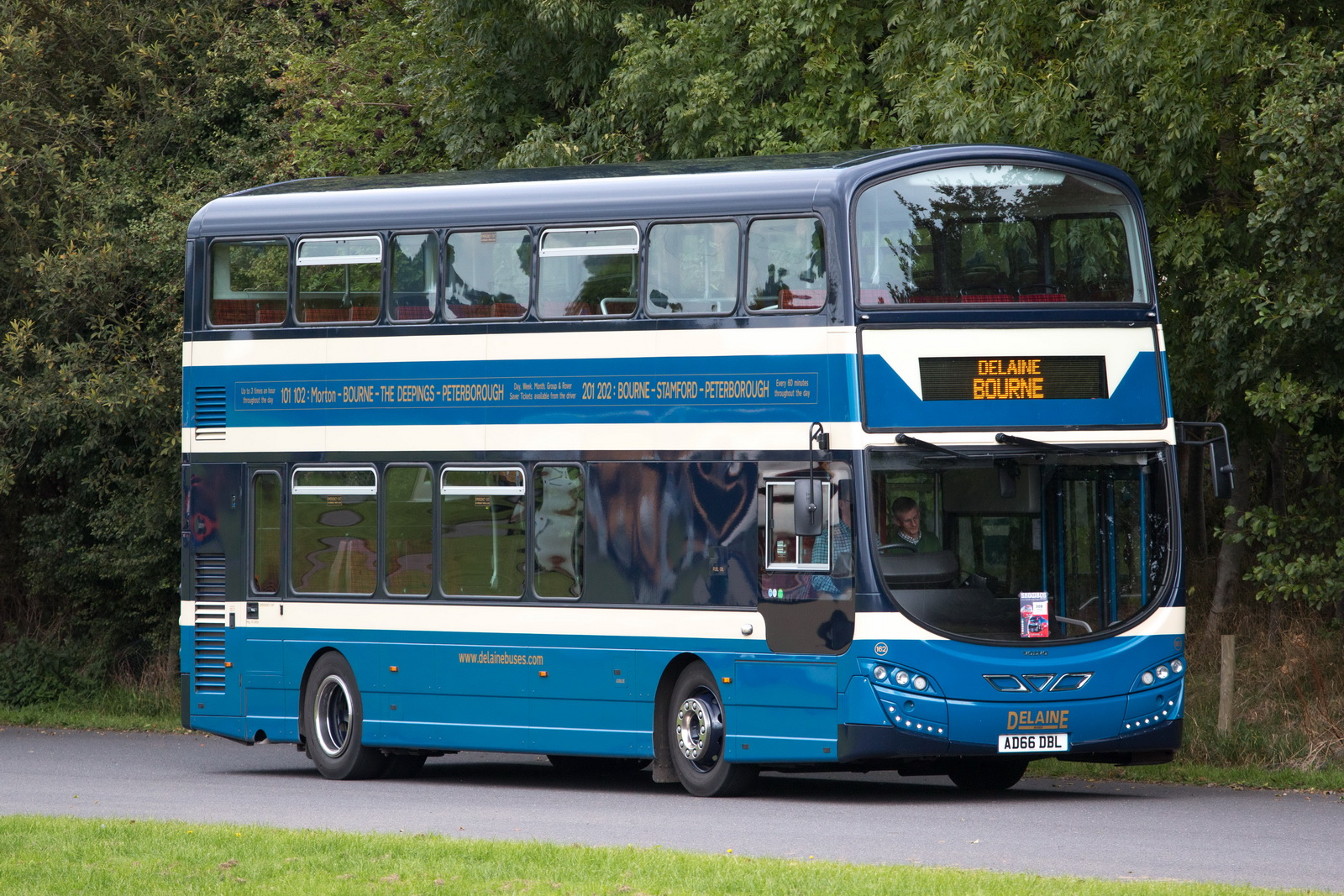
- Wright Eclipse Gemini 3 bodied Volvo B5TL in September 2017
- Parent: Delaine-Smith family
- Founded: 1890
- Headquarters: Bourne, Lincolnshire
- Service area: Peterborough
- Service type: Bus services
- Fleet: 35 (September 2024)
- Website: www.delainebuses.com

Traditional Delaine cast fleetname

Delaine Buses is a bus operator based in Bourne, Lincolnshire, England.

== History ==
In 1890, William Smith began a horse drawn passenger service. After a taxi operation commenced in 1910, a 14-seat Ford Model T bus was purchased in 1919 and services commenced to Grantham, Spalding, and Stamford. In May 1941, the business was incorporated.

== Services ==
As of July 2020, Delaine Buses operates seven bus routes.

== Fleet ==
From the 1930s to the 1990s, the majority of vehicles in the Delaine fleet were of Bedford or Leyland manufacture. By 1995, Delaine had standardised on Volvos with East Lancs body, followed by switching over to Wrights in 2009 after East Lancs merged with Optare.

As of September 2024, the fleet consisted of 35 buses. A heritage fleet is also maintained.

== Gallery ==
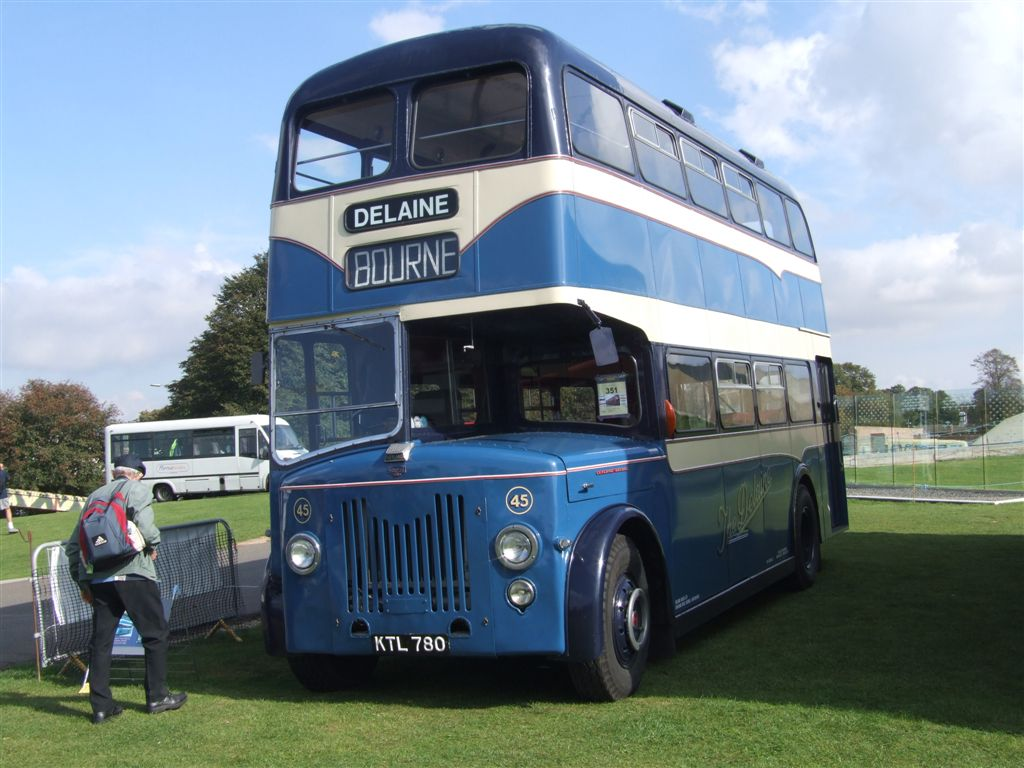
Preserved Leyland Titan in September 2006

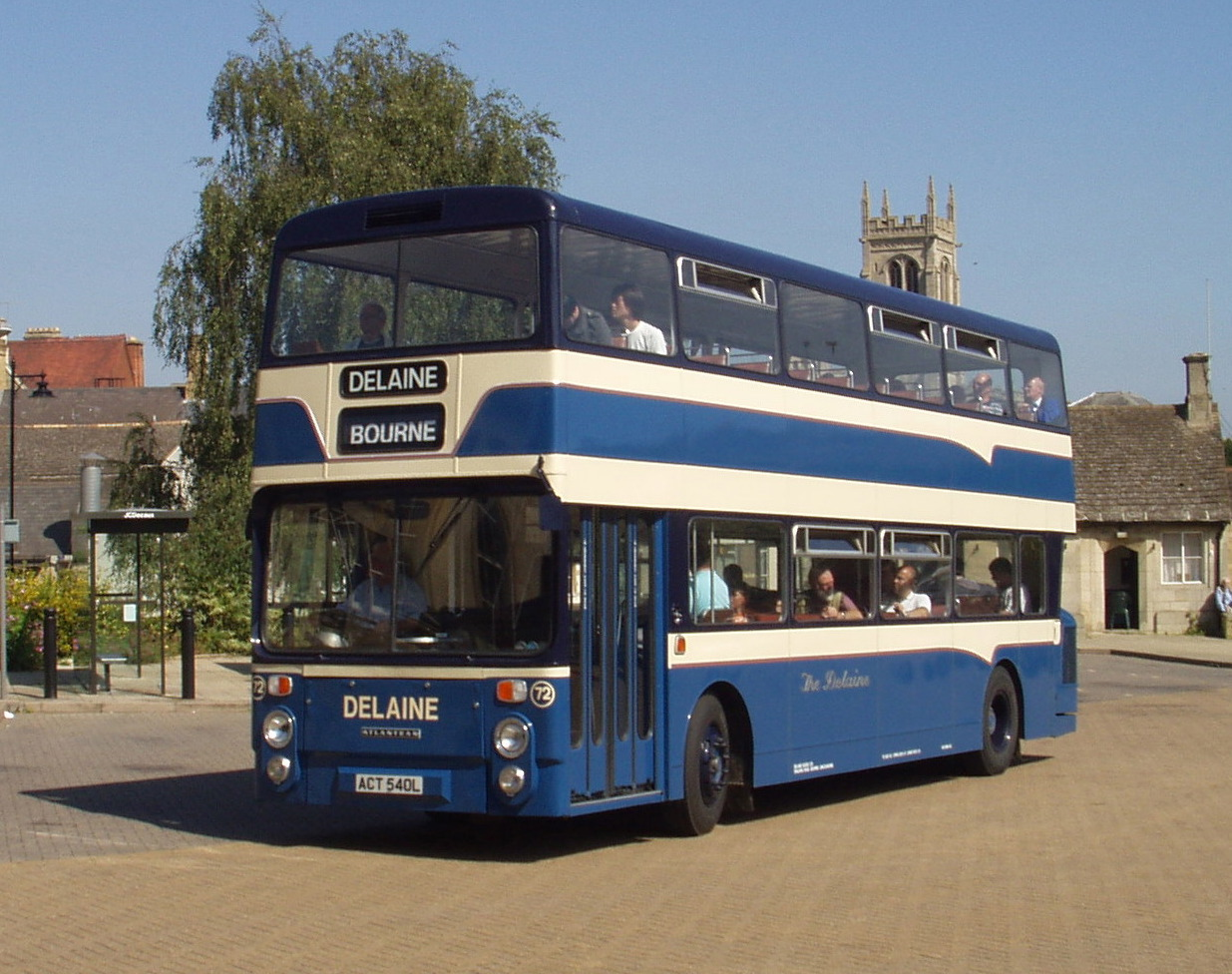
Preserved Northern Counties bodied Leyland Atlantean in August 2007

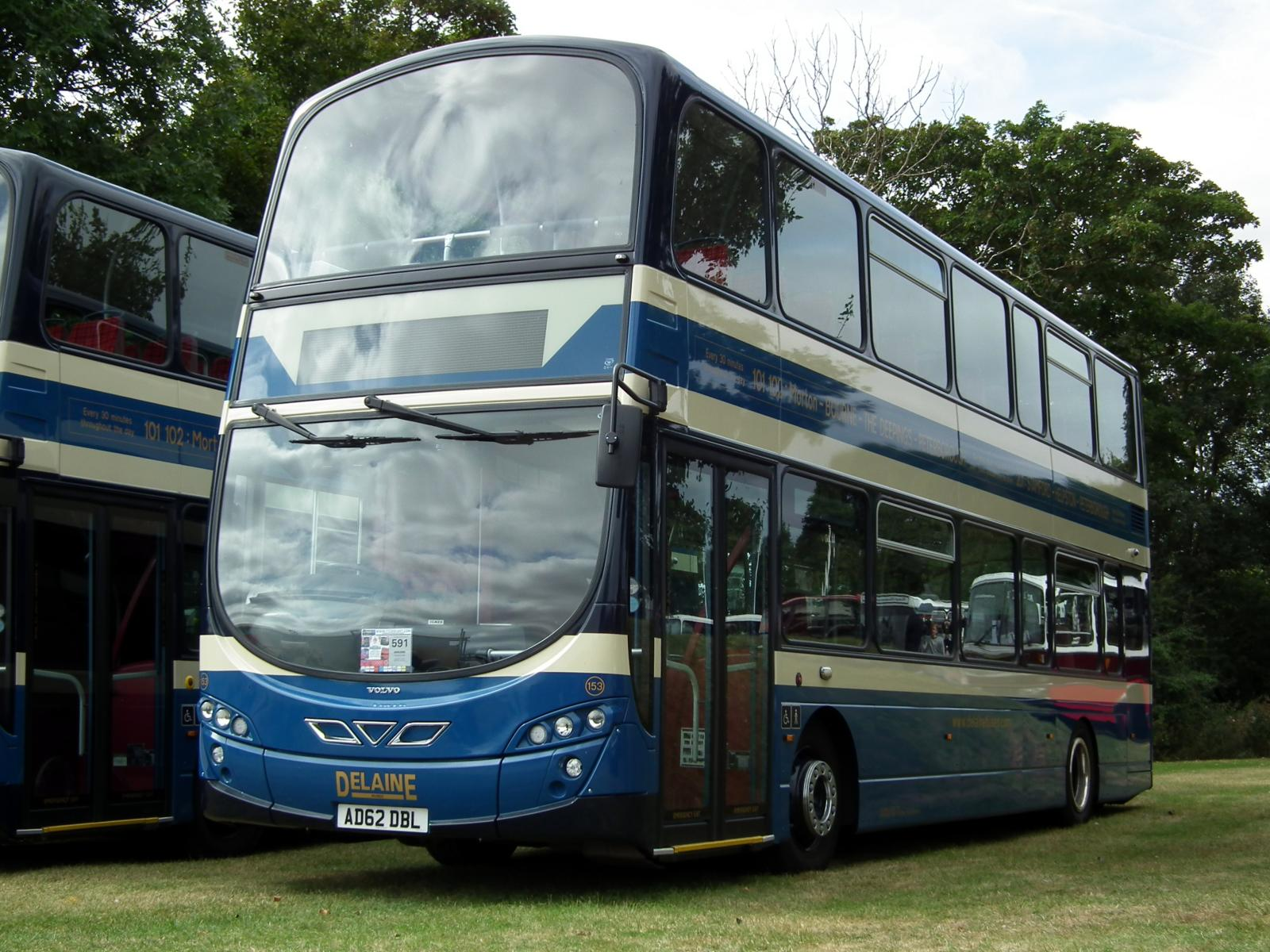
Wright Eclipse Gemini 2 bodied Volvo B9TL in September 2012

== See also ==
- List of bus operators of the United Kingdom
