= Volvo B9TL =

Low-floor double-decker bus built by Volvo

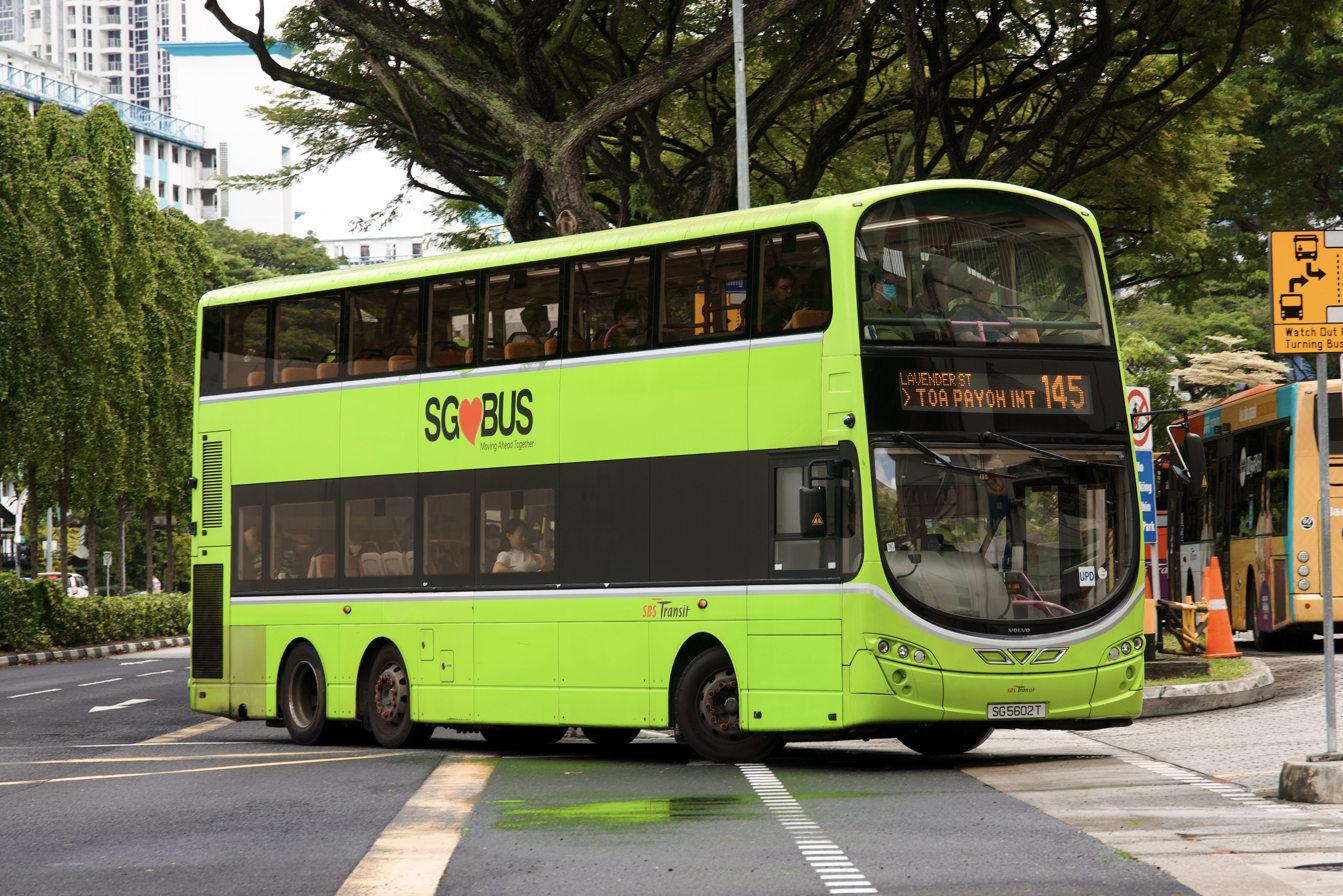
- SBS Transit Wright Eclipse Gemini 2 bodied 3-axle Volvo B9TL in May 2024, Singapore

Overview
- Manufacturer: Volvo
- Production: 2002–2018 (3-axle); 2005–2016 (2-axle)
- Assembly: Borås, Sweden

Body and chassis
- Class: Double-decker bus
- Doors: 1-2
- Floor type: Low floor

Powertrain
- Engine: Volvo D9A/D9B
- Power output: Volvo D9A: 300hp, 340hp Volvo D9B: 260hp, 310hp
- Transmission: ZF Ecomat; ZF EcoLife; Voith DIWA

Chronology
- Predecessor: Volvo B7TL (2-axle); Volvo Super Olympian (3-axle)
- Successor: Volvo B5TL (2-axle); Volvo B8L (3-axle)

The Volvo B9TL is a low-floor double-decker bus built by Volvo from 2002 until 2018. It superseded the Volvo Super Olympian and the Volvo B7TL. The 2-axle version has been superseded by the Volvo B5TL in 2014 and the 3-axle version has been superseded by the Volvo B8L in 2018.

== Chassis ==
The Volvo B9TL chassis shared the same design of the Volvo B7TL. The key difference from both its predecessors, the Volvo Super Olympian and Volvo B7TL, was a new 9.3-litre engine originally designed by Renault Trucks, now a subsidiary of Volvo. The radiator was located at the rear offside, similar to the smaller B7TL. The front module design was shared with other low-floor bus chassis built by Volvo, and independent suspension is fitted at the front axle (replaced by conventional front suspension after some years of production).

The B9TL was initially offered in three-axle format, and the two-axle variant was added in 2006 to replace the B7TL. The driveline comprises a Volvo D9A Euro III engine (rated at 300 hp or 340 hp), which was later replaced by the Volvo D9B Euro IV/V/EEV engine (using selective catalytic reduction technology; two versions were offered - the D9B260 rated at 260 hp for two-axle version, and a higher powered D9B310, rated at 310 hp, for three-axle version), and coupled to ZF 5-speed or 6-speed automatic gearbox. Volvo also offered the Voith four-speed gearbox as an alternative gearbox option.

== Asia Pacific ==
=== Hong Kong ===
==== Kowloon Motor Bus ====
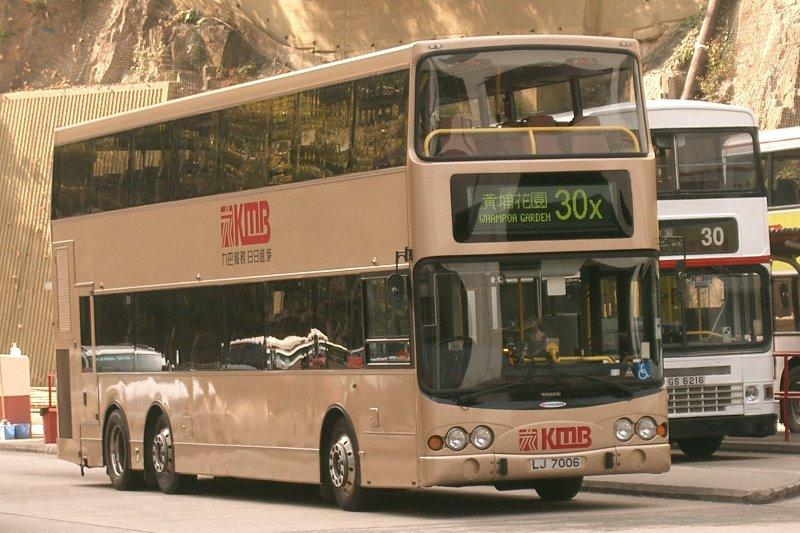
Volvo B9TL prototype with Volgren CR223LD bodywork

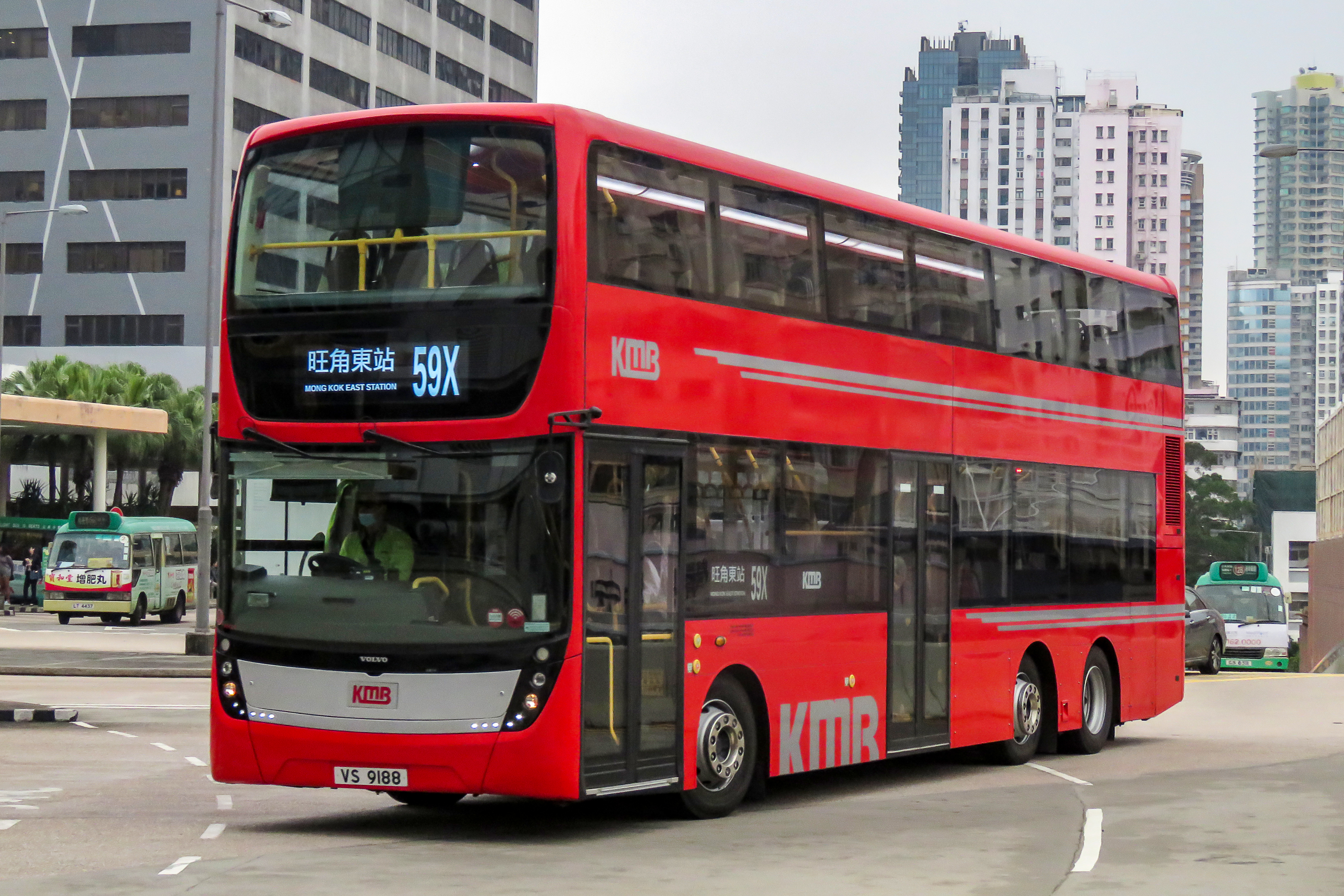
Kowloon Motor Bus' Gemilang-bodied Volvo B9TL on its first day of service

A Volvo B9TL prototype with a Volgren CR223LD body was delivered to Hong Kong in July 2003 for Kowloon Motor Bus (KMB) as a demonstrator for the Eco-Driveline concept. It was put into service in April 2004 and registered as MF5119.

In early 2004, a Volvo B9TL prototype with a facelifted version of the TransBus Enviro500 body arrived in Hong Kong and registered as LU3721. It had a slightly different front and rear design, and its rear route number box was moved beneath the upper deck rear window. After TransBus International was renamed Alexander Dennis in May 2004, it became the only TransBus Enviro-series bus with a non-Dennis chassis as well as the only facelifted version of the Enviro500 to be manufactured during this period.

Later in the same year, a Wright-bodied B9TL prototype was also delivered. The rear design of its Wright body differed from that of the Wright-bodied Volvo Super Olympian, with the number plate positioned beneath (and slightly to the right of) the rear route box.

In 2005, KMB ordered 63 B9TL chassis with Wright bodywork and 50 with Enviro500 Mark 2 bodies. The Wright-bodied buses entered service between 2005 and 2006, and the Enviro500 Mark 2 bodied buses entered service in late 2006/2007. These were followed by another 35 buses with Enviro500 Mark 2 bodywork, which entered service in 2007/2008. All Enviro500 Mark 2-bodied B9TLs were retired on 3 December 2025.

In 2009, KMB ordered 60 Wright Eclipse Gemini 2 bodied B9TLs, quickly followed by another 115, they have begun delivery as of early 2010. These were followed by an order for a further 115 Wright-bodied B9TLs in 2010. All these buses entered service between 2010 and 2012.

A 10.6-metre 2-axle B9TL was put into service by KMB in 2010. It was equipped with a Volvo D9B-310 engine and a ZF EcoLife 6AP1403B gearbox.

Starting from June 2017, some of the new B9TLs were painted with a new livery featuring red and silver stripes, with the motto "Heartbeat of the City" displayed at the top of the vehicle. The last Wright-bodied 12-metre B9TL was put into service in August 2018.

KMB ordered three Gemilang bodied B9TLs in 2017. They were registered in September 2018 and entered service in March 2019.

As of July 2020, there are 953 Volvo B9TLs in service with KMB.

==== Long Win Bus ====
Long Win Bus received 10 B9TL with Alexander Dennis Enviro500 Mark 2 bodywork which entered service in 2007/2008. All vehicles in this batch are almost identical to those with Kowloon Motor Bus.

Due to a surplus in Long Win's fleet, all of them have been transferred to KMB from 2020 to 2022.

==== Citybus ====
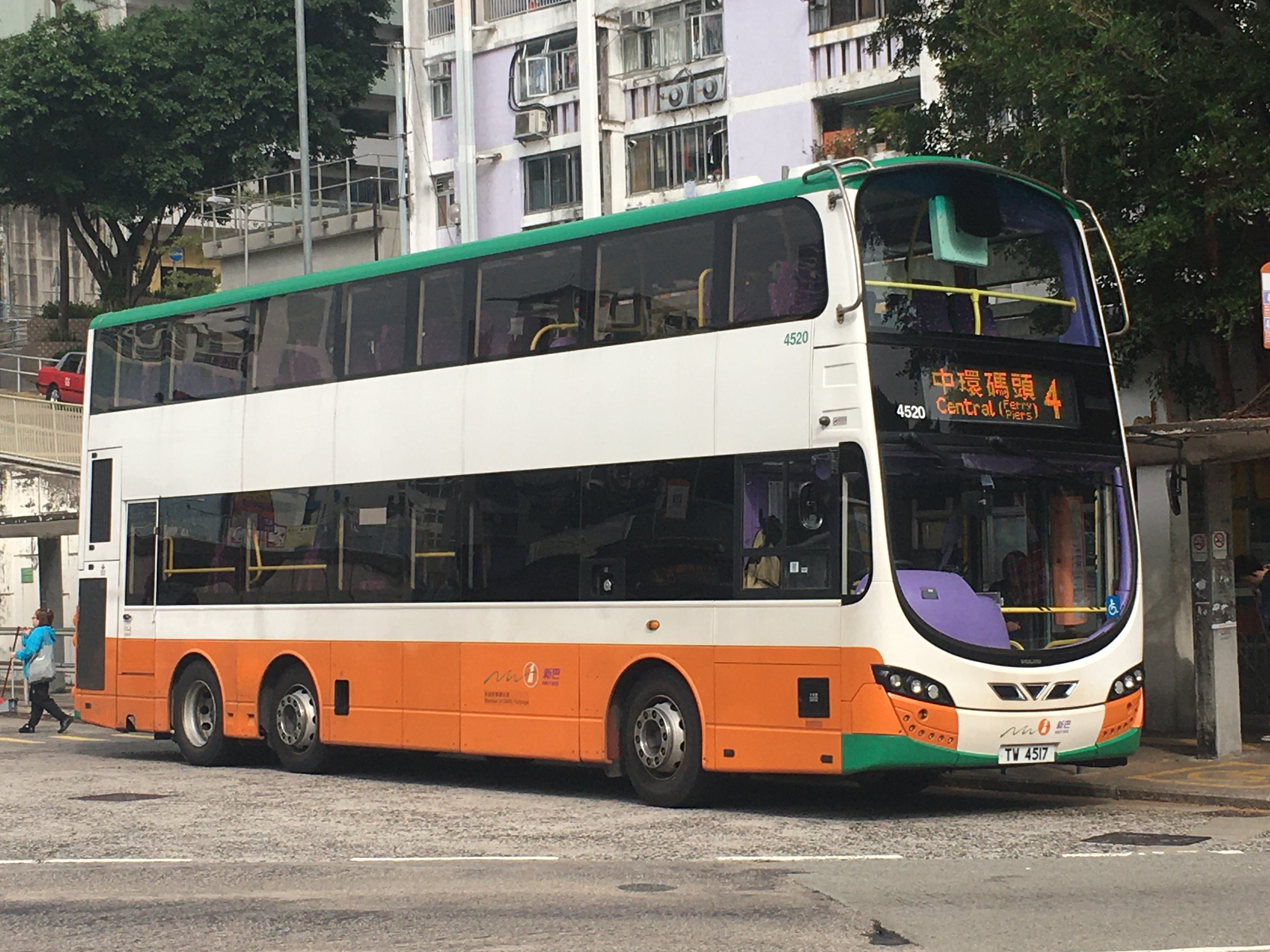
11.3-metre Wright Eclipse Gemini 2-bodied B9TL

Citybus received one Wright Eclipse Gemini 2-bodied two-axle B9TL (fleet number 7500) on 31 July 2010. This vehicle was first registered in November 2010 and entered service in the following month.

Citybus and New World First Bus placed an order for 51 Wright Eclipse Gemini 2-bodied tri-axle in March 2014, including 50 11.3-metre buses and a 12.8-metre bus for Citybus. They were assembled by Wrightbus's new partner, Masdef, in Malaysia.

Citybus and New World First Bus placed another order of 65 B9TLs in 2015, including 40 11.3-metre and 25 12-metres buses. All of these have been put into service since 2016.

==== Discovery Bay Transit Services ====
Discovery Bay Transit Services (DBTSL) from Discovery Bay placed an order of six 12.0m Wright Eclipse Gemini 2-bodied B9TL in 2014. They are equipped with Volvo D9B-310 engine and ZF EcoLife 6AP1403B gearbox. All vehicles were delivered between June and July 2015. They entered service on 16 August 2015.

==== MTR Bus ====
MTR Bus took delivery of 68 11.3-metres Wright Eclipse Gemini 2-bodied B9TLs in 2016/2017. This batch of buses are equipped with Volvo D9B-310 engine and Voith DIWA 864.5 gearbox. They are used to replace the aged Dennis Trident buses.

=== Singapore ===
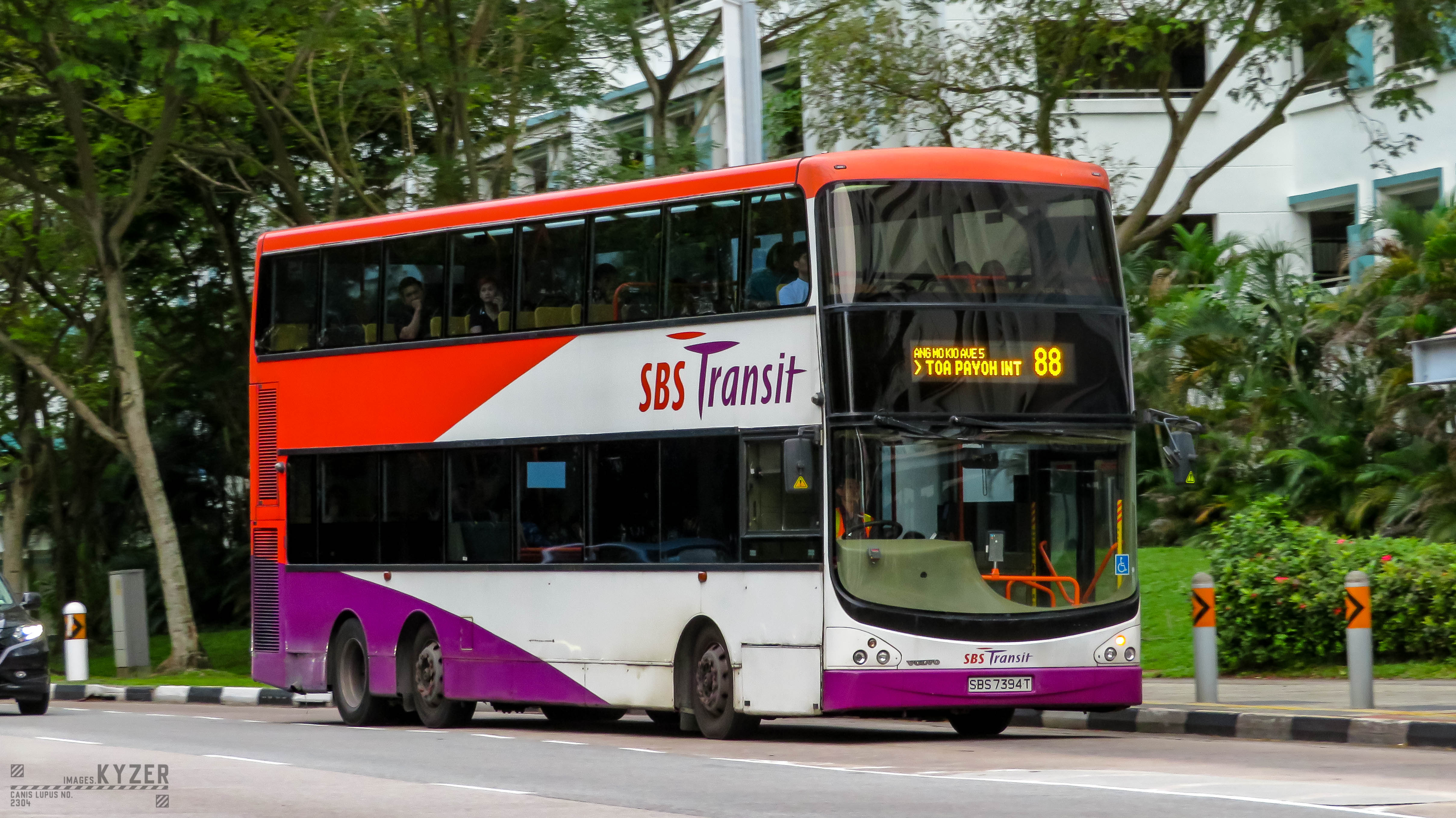
SBS Transit Volvo B9TL with ComfortDelGro Engineering bodywork

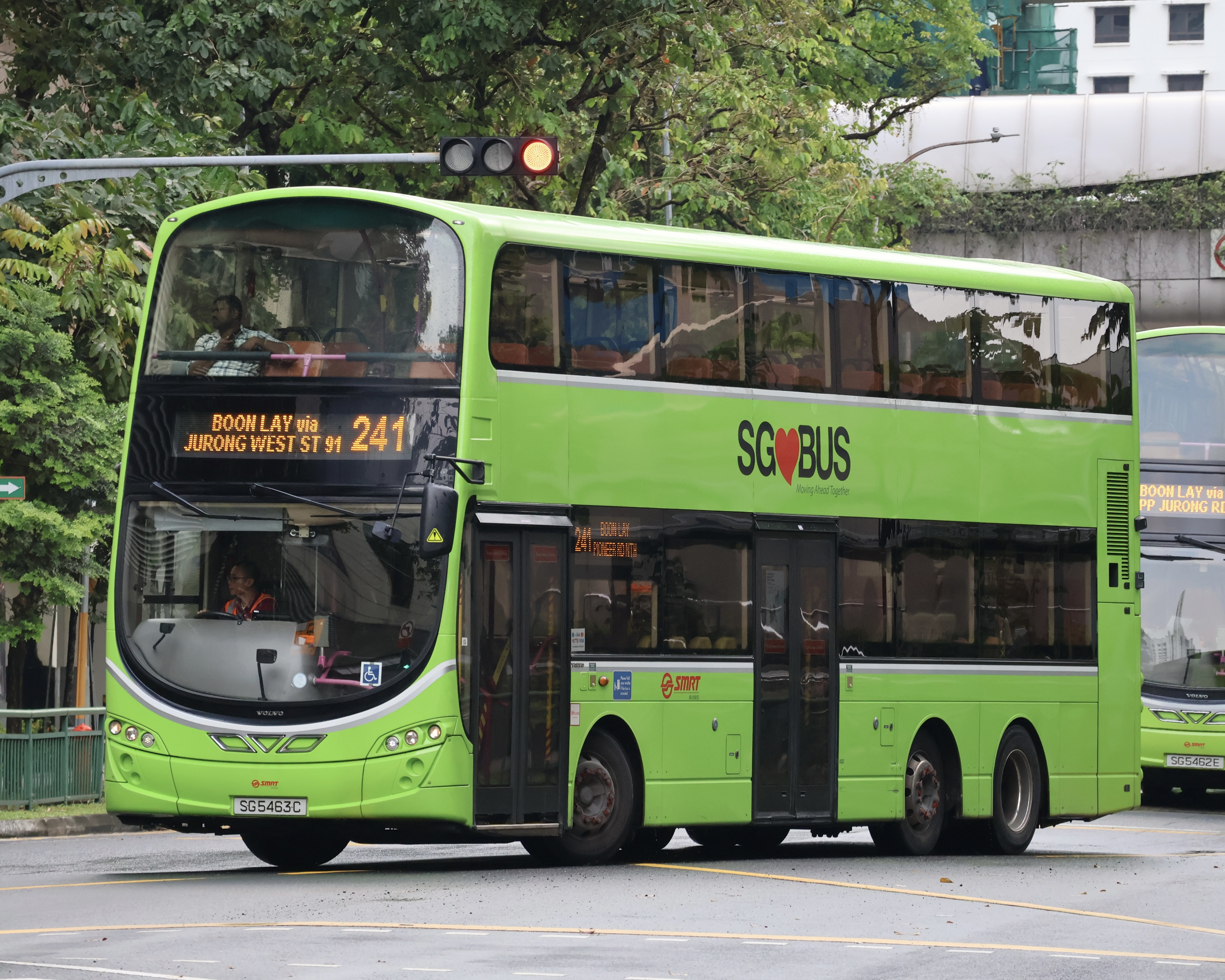
Under the bus contracting model, other operators, such as SMRT Buses, also leased Volvo B9TLs (Wright Eclipse Gemini 2) from the Land Transport Authority for operations.

SBS Transit of Singapore placed an order for 150 B9TL chassis on 28 December 2004, then the largest single order of B9TLs, which were fitted with bodywork from ComfortDelGro Engineering, part of SBS Transit's parent company. An additional order for 50 more chassis was placed in 2006 at a cost of S$29 million soon after putting its first B9TLs into operation, bringing the total fleet size to 200 sets. These buses were delivered by October 2007. These were the only SBS Transit owned buses to be repainted into LTA's lush green livery during their lifespan and refurbishment interior cabin (except SBS7440T). Because the number of buses were registered in large numbers between June and September 2006, Volvo B9TL CDGEs were gradually retired from March 2021 and staggered to reduce overcrowding until September 2023, and were scrapped at Kiat Lee scrapyard (Kranji), these Volvo B9TL CDGE-bodied units were being replaced by the MAN A95 Euro 6 and Alexander Dennis Enviro500 MMC buses. SBS7376X was later converted to a Bus Engineering Lab and preserved at ITE College West upon retirement. The PSV International/ComfortDelGro Engineering (CDGE)-bodied buses were powered by the Volvo D9A-300 EM-EC01 engine (9,364cc) which is Euro 3 compliant. Of 200 units, 50 units were fitted with a Voith DIWA 864.3 4-speed automatic transmission and the rest were fitted with a ZF Ecomat 6HP 592C 6-speed automatic transmission.

From 2009 to 2014, SBS Transit and the Land Transport Authority procured a grand total of 1,606 Volvo B9TLs with Wright Eclipse Gemini 2 bodywork. These buses were split into 5 batches based on technical specifications and the different interior configurations. Batches 1 and 2 were low-entry configuration buses while the Batches 3, 4 and 5 were low-floor configuration buses. Similar to Hong Kong's TransBus International/Dennis Enviro500 units, the Batch 5 units featured a straight staircase instead of square or rectangle-case design on the step-floor, previously the 4 batches have an original staircase design similar to older double decker buses (most recently the B9TL PSV/ComfortDelGroEngineering).

On 13 August 2009, SBS Transit announced an order of 150 Volvo B9TLs (Batch 1), with Wright Eclipse Gemini 2 bodies, replacing 55 Leyland Olympian 3-axle and 8 Volvo Olympian 2-axle. These B9TLs were delivered between 13 September 2010 and 26 August 2011. One demonstrator (SBS7500D) was built by Wrightbus in Ballymena, Northern Ireland. It was later delivered to Singapore and entered revenue service in November 2010, whereas all other double-deck B9TLs were bodied by ComfortDelGro Engineering at Hougang Bus Depot (HGDEP). Beginning in 2028, all refurbished Volvo B9TL Wright Batch 1 & 2 units will be extending the lifespan to 2 years, ending the lifespan from 2030. All low-entry configuration Volvo B9TL (Wright) buses (except SBS7609A, SBS7625C & SBS7701R) went for interior refurbishment.

On 6 September 2010, SBS Transit ordered another 300 Wright-bodied Volvo B9TLs (Batch 2 and 3), delivered between 21 September 2011 and 28 December 2012, replacing the rest of Leyland Olympian 3-axle and 3 Volvo Olympian 3-axle (Batch 1). 30 buses (Batch 2) were delivered as low-entry, while the remaining 270 buses (Batch 3) were delivered completely low-floor. In 2012, 30 of the Batch 3 low-floor buses were diverted to the Land Transport Authority's Bus Service Enhancement Programme (BSEP).

On 9 July 2012, SBS Transit ordered another 565 Wright-bodied Volvo B9TLs (Batch 4), delivered between 30 January 2013 and 18 June 2015, to replace most of their older buses, as well as fleet additions and introduction of new bus routes under the BSEP. SBS Transit's final order of 415 Volvo B9TLs (Batch 5) was announced on 1 July 2014, two years before the transition of Singapore's bus industry to the Land Transport Authority's (LTA) Bus Contracting Model in 2016 having only 94 units delivered.

Currently, these buses reside at Hougang Bus Depot (HGDEP). These buses were powered by Volvo D9B-310 EC06B engine (9,365cc) that is compliant Euro 5 emission standards. Batch 1 units were fitted with a ZF Ecolife 6AP 1410B 6-speed automatic transmission, while some other Batch 2, 3 and 4 units were fitted with a Voith DIWA 864.5 4-speed automatic transmission. Batch 5 units were equipped with a ZF Ecolife 6AP 1403B 6-speed automatic transmission.

Due to the enormous quantity of Volvo B9TLs procured, especially those bodied with the Wright Eclipse Gemini 2 bodywork, these buses can be found in large numbers around Singapore.

A Gemilang-bodied B9TL demonstrator (SBS7777Y) entered service in February 2014, operating mainly on Bus 7. It made special appearances on Buses 96 and 545. The bus exterior design like a Scania K310UD (SBS7888K) unit, features an orange indicator with headlights and daytime running lamps (DRL), with the interior featuring Ster NewCity seats made in Poland. The bus was permanently reassigned as a training bus from 2016.

== Australia ==
Volgren bodied B9TLs were purchased by CDC Melbourne and Thompsons Bus Service.

== Europe ==
=== United Kingdom ===
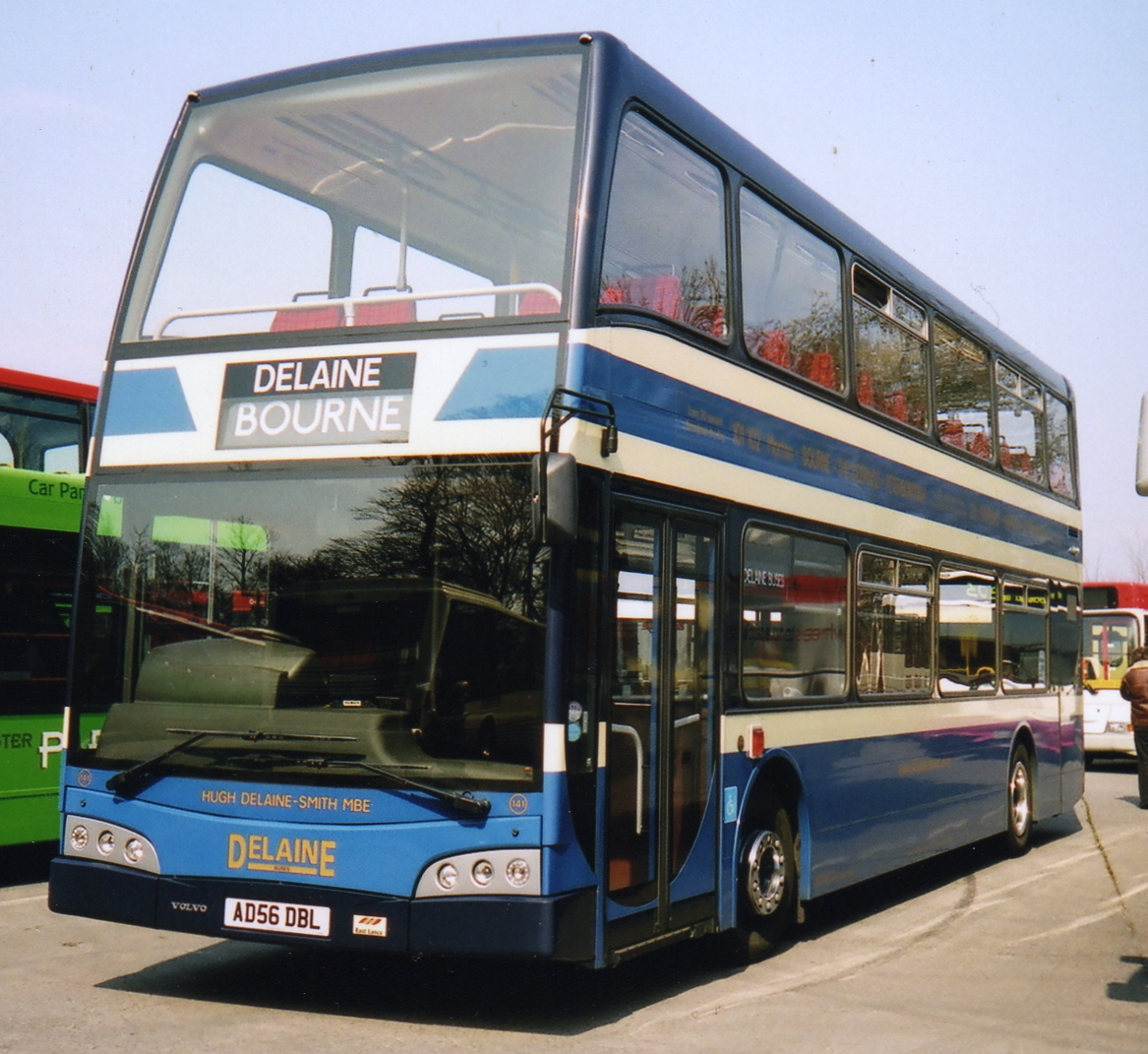
Delaine Buses East Lancs Olympus-bodied 2-axle Volvo B9TL, this was the first Olympus built

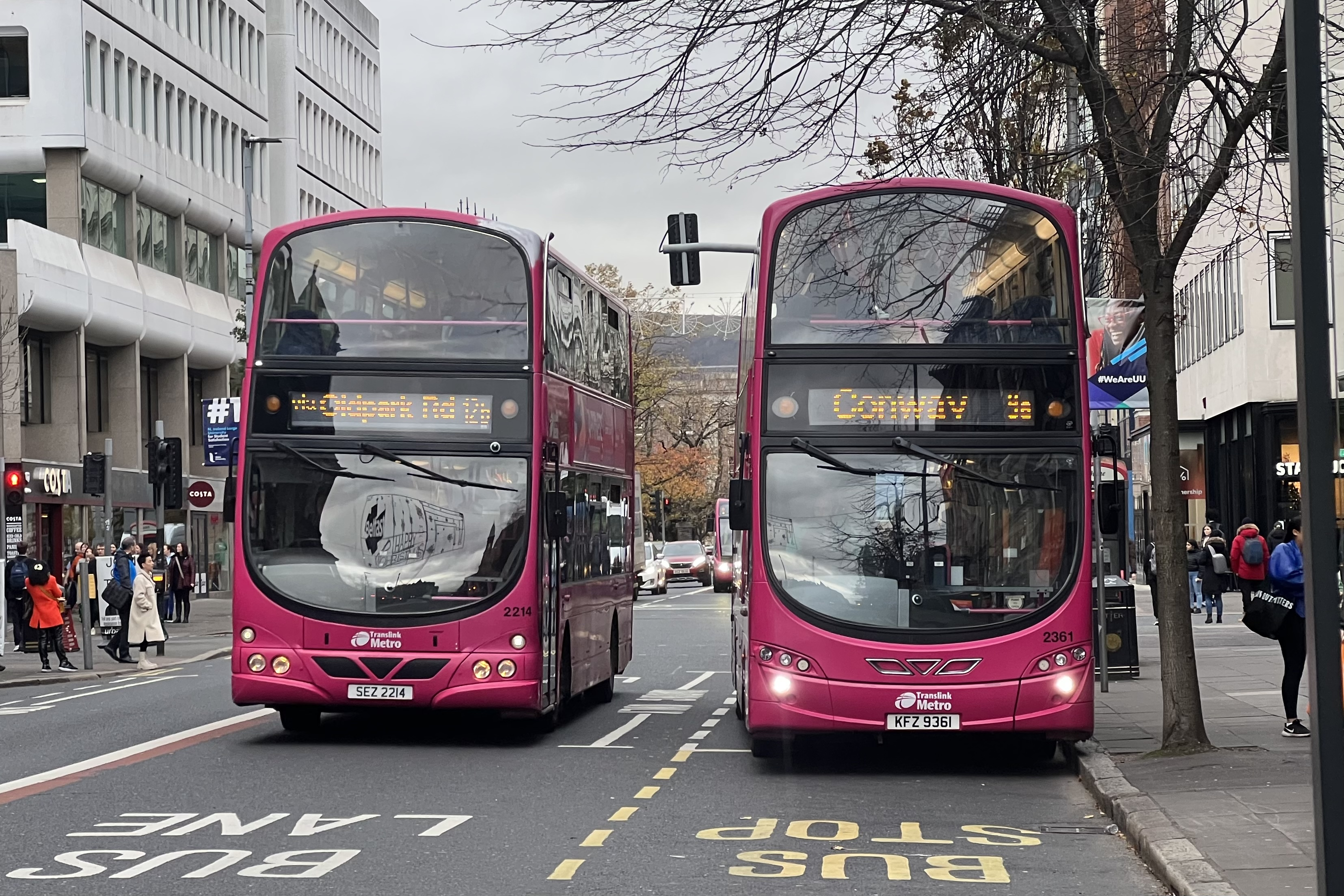
Translink Metro Wright Eclipse Gemini 1-bodied (left) and Wright Eclipse Gemini 2-bodied (right) 2-axle Volvo B9TLs

In three-axle form, the B9TL made its debut in the United Kingdom when Weavaway Travel of Newbury placed an order for six B9TL with East Lancs Myllennium Nordic bodywork in late 2004 and put them into service in April/May 2005. Since then, two more were sold to Roadliner of Poole and Provence Private Hire of St Albans for school contracts and commercial work.

The two-axle Volvo B9TL did not make its debut in the United Kingdom until the middle of 2006. The first demonstrator, with Wright Eclipse Gemini body, was delivered to London General in July 2006 for evaluation, it is used on route 11. The first order was secured from Delaine Buses for two examples with the new East Lancs Olympus bodywork. The first Olympus-bodied B9TL, along with an Alexander Dennis Enviro400-bodied version, were both unveiled at the 2006 Euro Bus Expo at the National Exhibition Centre in Birmingham during November.

Initial sales of the two-axle version were slow in Britain, particularly in London, after falling foul with the noise and capacity requirements imposed by Transport for London. Eventually orders were also received for the Volvo B9TLs by First London, Go-Ahead London and Metroline. The B9TL had success with Lothian Buses, FirstGroup, East Yorkshire Motor Services, Highland Scottish, Yorkshire Coastliner and Flights Hallmark, Tower Transit where orders were received from 2007 to 2014.

The first order from Arriva was for 10 East Lancs Visionaire open top buses for The Original Tour in January 2007; and delivered in April - November 2007. An additional 16 buses were delivered in October 2011 - February 2012.

It was followed by an order for 16 buses with Darwen Olympus bodywork in high specification featuring leather seats for Arriva Yorkshire entering service between January and May 2008.

London General brought three buses on the Alexander Dennis Enviro 400 bodies for use on route 85. Afterwards, they are then reallocated to Sutton Bus Garage, operating on routes 93, 151, 154, and 213. These buses are now operated by metrobus - across the Crawley area - as in 03/09/2024.

In Northern Ireland, Translink purchased 125 Volvo B9TLs, all bodied by Wrightbus.

=== Ireland ===
Dublin Bus of Dublin, Ireland placed an order for 20 B9TL with single-door Alexander Dennis Enviro500 bodywork in early 2005. These buses were the largest in the fleet and also the first tri-axle double deckers for the Irish capital, the first of them entered service in December 2005. They were withdrawn and sold in December 2018.

In 2007, Dublin Bus ordered 50 B9TL with Alexander Dennis Enviro400 bodywork and another 50 B9TL with Alexander Dennis Enviro500 bodywork for delivery in 2007/2008. The two-axle buses entered service in summer/autumn 2007, and the three-axle buses entered service in December 2007/early 2008. Later Dublin Bus ordered 50 B9TL with Alexander Dennis Enviro400 bodywork and 50 B9TL with Wright Eclipse Gemini bodywork for delivery in 2008/2009. In 2012, Dublin Bus received 80 B9TL with Wright Eclipse Gemini 2 bodywork, but retaining the older Eclipse Gemini front. A further 80 B9TL with Wright Eclipse Gemini 2 bodywork, were received by Dublin Bus in 2013.

Bus Éireann also put 10 Wright Eclipse Gemini-bodied Volvo B9TL into service in late 2008, and a further 10 Wright Eclipse Gemini 2-bodied Volvo B9TL in 2012.

=== Other European cities ===
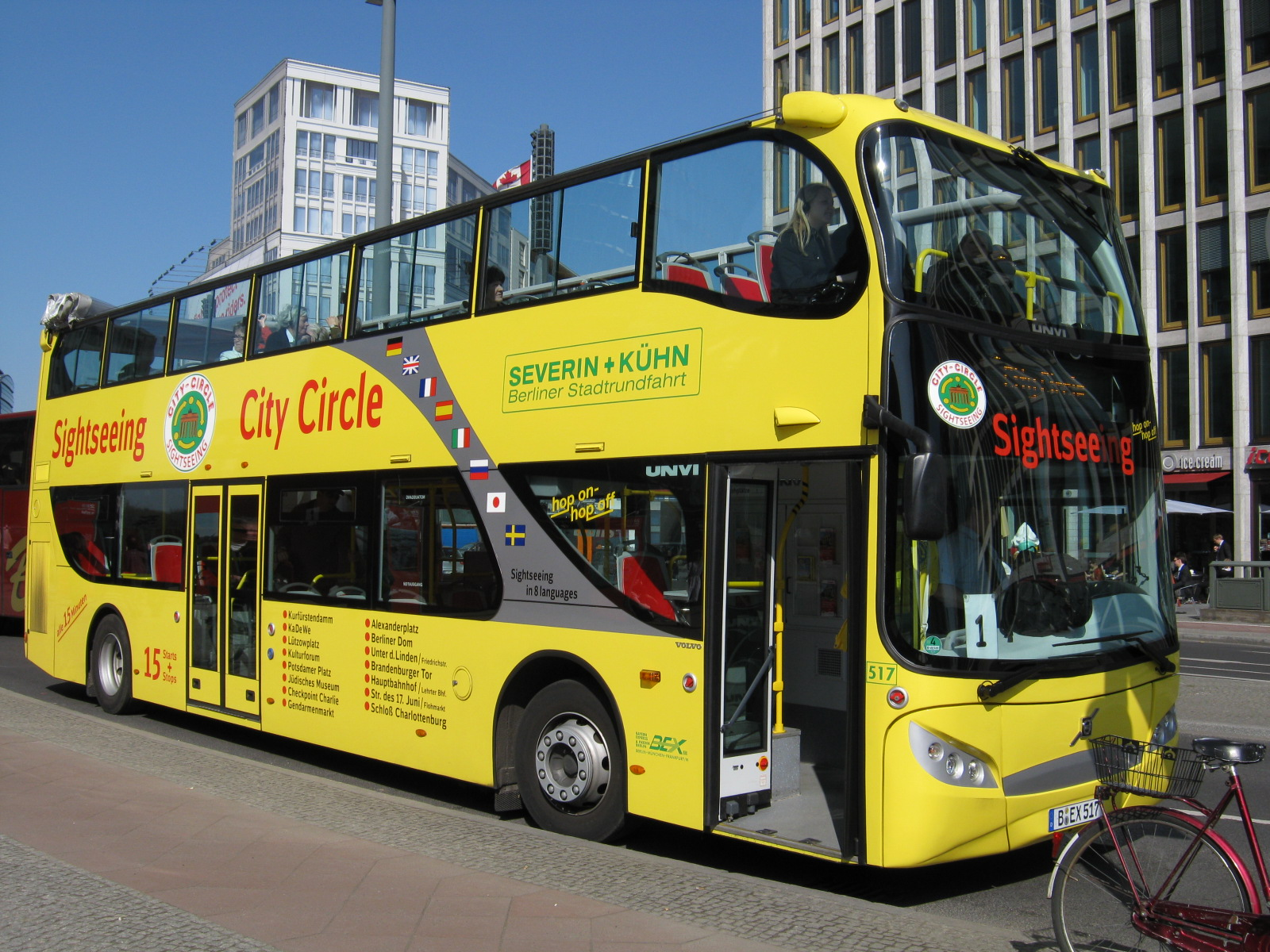
A sightseeing B9TL in Berlin

A number of two-axle Volvo B9TL open top buses were sold to a number of cities in Europe for sightseeing purposes.

== Successors ==
The 2-axle Volvo B9TL was replaced by the Volvo B5TL in 2014. The 3-axle Volvo B9TL was replaced by the Volvo B8L in 2018.
