= East Lancs Vyking =

Low-floor double-deck bus body on Volvo B7L and B7TL chassis

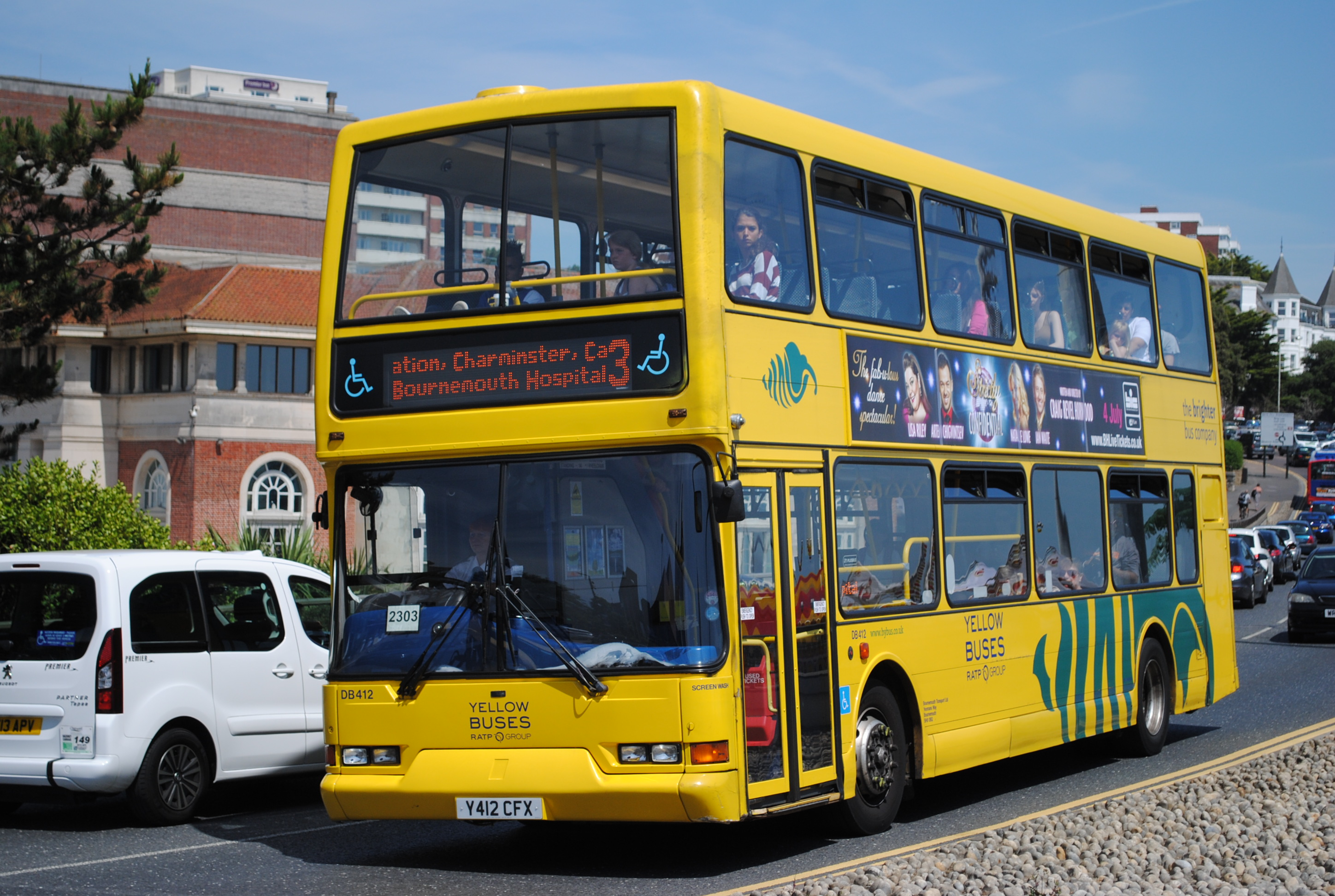
- Yellow Buses Vyking bodied Volvo B7TL in Bournemouth in 2013

Overview
- Manufacturer: East Lancashire Coachbuilders
- Production: 1999–2003 (Original); 2001-2006 (Myllenium Vyking)

Body and chassis
- Doors: 1 or 2
- Floor type: Low floor
- Chassis: Volvo B7L; Volvo B7TL
- Related: East Lancs Lolyne; East Lancs Nordic

Powertrain
- Capacity: 63 to 80 seated

Dimensions
- Length: 10.2–10.932 m (33 ft 5.6 in – 35 ft 10.4 in)
- Width: 2.535 m (8 ft 3.8 in)
- Height: 4.2–4.3 m (13 ft 9 in – 14 ft 1 in)

Chronology
- Predecessor: East Lancs Pyoneer
- Successor: East Lancs Olympus

The East Lancs Vyking is a double-decker bus body built on the Volvo B7L and Volvo B7TL chassis by East Lancashire Coachbuilders. It is the double-deck version of the Spryte, continuing the long line of 'misspelt' names which continued until the Scania OmniDekka; the name "Vyking" derived from the chassis being built by a company from Sweden.

== Design ==
Options included air conditioning, additional CCTV, bonded glazing, double glazing, driver protection, electronic destination displays, powered wheelchair ramp. The Vyking could additionally be built either as a closed-top or a purpose-built open-top bus, the latter being made available with a detachable top-deck roof.

In 2001, East Lancs launched the facelifted East Lancs Myllennium Vyking, replacing the original Vyking and featuring a redesigned front fascia in line with East Lancs' other 'Myllennium' bodies. The Myllennium Vyking was built between 2001 and 2006.

== Operators ==
=== Vyking ===
The launch customer for the first generation East Lancs Vyking was the FirstGroup, whose First CentreWest subsidiary took the first Vyking produced for use on London Buses route 207 in October 2000; originally fitted with air conditioning and sealed window panes, this bus was later retrofitted with openable windows after the air conditioning system was found to be underperforming. This Vyking was later converted to a mobile classroom for use by mechanics and technicians training with the FirstGroup in late 2010.

The largest operator of East Lancs Vykings were Yellow Buses of Bournemouth, who as part of an order for 25 Vykings, took delivery of 19 Vykings between 2001 and 2003, some of which were delivered as convertible open-toppers.

The first generation Vyking was also highly popular with members of the Traction Group throughout the body's production. Strathtay Scottish took delivery of sixteen Vykings between 2001 and 2005, while Lincolnshire RoadCar took delivery of 20 Vykings between 2001 and 2005, primarily for use on rural Lincolnshire InterConnect services.

Independent purchasers of the East Lancs Vyking included Delaine Buses of Bourne, who took delivery of five between 2001 and 2005.

=== Myllennium Vyking ===
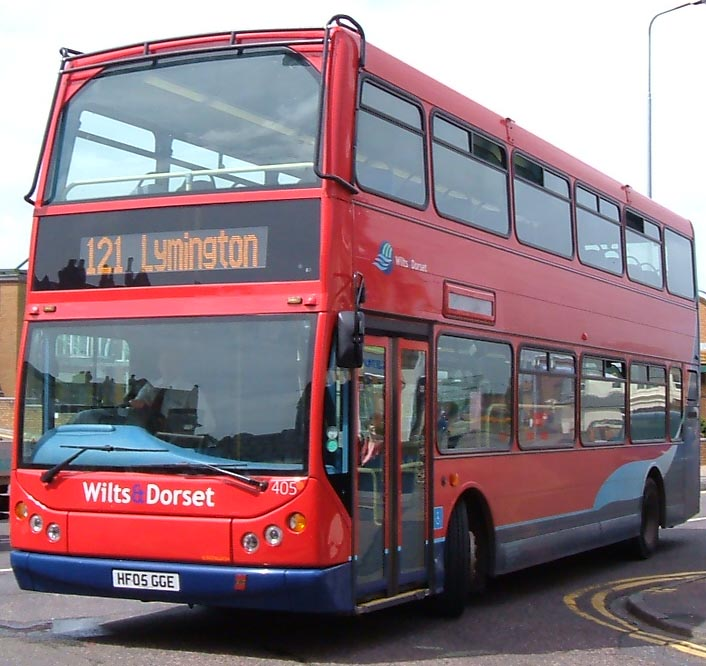
Wilts & Dorset East Lancs Myllennium Vyking in Boscombe in May 2006

The first eight production Myllennium Vykings were delivered to Solent Blue Line in late 2001. Thirteen Myllennium Vykings were delivered as convertible open-toppers to neighbouring Wilts & Dorset in 2005, with six closed top models additionally delivered to Yellow Buses of Bournemouth between 2004 and 2005.

52 Myllennium Vykings were delivered to London General in 2002, with a further 49 delivered to London United between 2003 and 2004; nineteen of London United's Myllennium Vykings had originally been ordered as TransBus Presidents before being swapped to East Lancs bodies due to TransBus International falling into administration during 2004.

One Myllennium Vyking body shell was sold to the Metropolitan Police in January 2006 for use as a mobile careers and recruitment unit. The inside of the bus was converted by the force's specialist vehicle convertor MacNellie to feature a standard hands-free police radio, a satnav as well as a low bridge avoidance system and reversing camera, and two VCR and DVD-compatible Plasma displays, one of which faced outside the bus and was linked to external speakers for outside broadcast use.

=== Exports ===
Twenty Myllennium Vykings were delivered to Irish state-owned bus and coach operator Bus Éireann between 2002 and 2004 for use on commuter bus services to Dublin.

Bodies closely resembling the Vyking were produced on left-hand drive Volvo chassis for open-top sightseeing bus operators in Continental Europe. Open-top left-hand drive Vykings on Volvo B7L chassis were first supplied to Big Bus Tours operation in Paris, France, while Vykings on Volvo B7TL chassis were supplied to Car Rouges in Cannes, France and another sightseeing operator in Luxembourg in 2004. Vykings were also supplied to sightseeing operators Rome, Italy on both Volvo B7TL and an unknown Iveco chassis.

== See also ==
- List of buses
