= East Lancs Lolyne =

Low-floor double-decker bus body on Dennis Trident 2 chassis

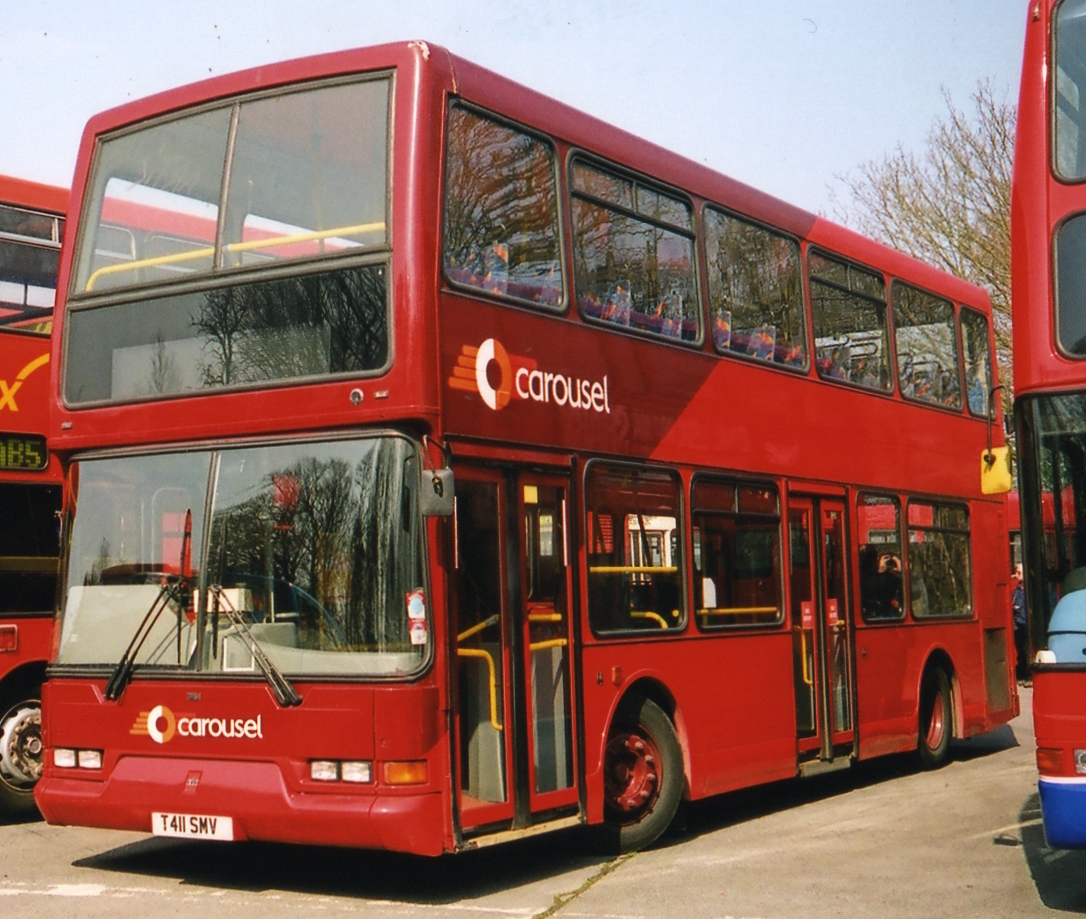
- Carousel Buses Lolyne bodied Dennis Trident 2 in 2007

Overview
- Manufacturer: East Lancashire Coachbuilders
- Production: 1999-2006 (Non-Myllenium Facelift); 2002-2006 (Myllenium Facelift)

Body and chassis
- Doors: 1 or 2
- Floor type: Low floor
- Chassis: Dennis Trident 2
- Related: East Lancs Vyking

Powertrain
- Capacity: 76 to 94 seated

Dimensions
- Length: 10 metres (33 ft) to 11.5 metres (38 ft)
- Width: 2,535 millimetres (99.8 in)
- Height: 4,195 millimetres (165.2 in) to 4,300 millimetres (170 in)

Chronology
- Predecessor: East Lancs Pyoneer
- Successor: East Lancs Olympus

The East Lancs Lolyne is a type of low-floor double-decker bus body built by East Lancs. Launched in 1999, the Lolyne was the double-decker version of the Spryte, built on the Dennis Trident 2 twin-axle low-floor chassis. The body could be built as either a closed top bus or an open-top bus, and the Lolyne name continued the long line of 'misspelt' names which continued until the Scania OmniDekka.

== Myllennium Lolyne ==
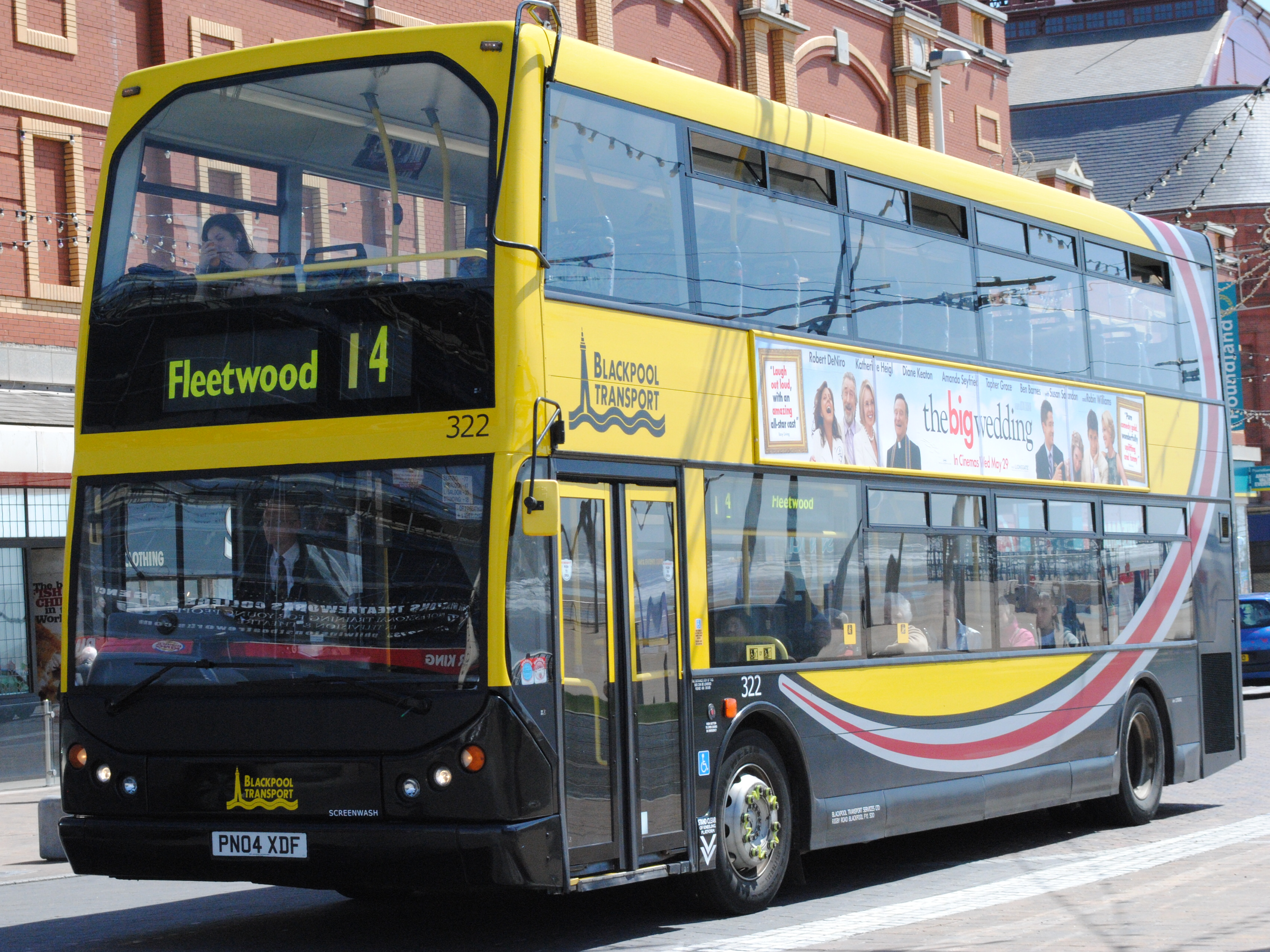
A Blackpool Transport Myllennium Lolyne in 2013

The facelifted East Lancs Myllennium Lolyne superseded the original Lolyne in 2002, featuring a revised front end based on the East Lancs Myllennium single-deck bus. The structure of the Myllennium Lolyne was built using the Alusuisse "System M5438" system.

== Operators ==
The first Lolynes were delivered to Nottingham City Transport in early 1999 as part of an order of 12 of the type, these being among the first Trident 2s produced. Nottingham City Transport would eventually become a major operator of pre-facelift Lolynes, taking a total of 54 between 1999 and 2001 as the company's standard low-floor double-decker bus.

Subsequent operators following the Lolyne's launch included Brighton & Hove, who ordered 20 Lolynes, some with convertible open-top roofs, in 1999 before taking delivery of a further 20 during 2000, Yellow Buses of Bournemouth, who took delivery of nine during 1999, and Maynes Buses of Manchester, who took delivery of five during 1999. Preston Bus took delivery of its first seven Lolynes with funding from Lancashire County Council in late 1999 as part of a 'Quality Bus' scheme to improve services running from Preston bus station to Tanterton, subsequently taking delivery of a further ten Lolynes during 2000.

=== Exports ===
The only export operators of East Lancs Lolynes in Continental Europe were two sightseeing operators in Spain, with these buses being built to open-top configuration; 25 Lolynes were delivered to Madrid Vision between 2001 and early 2002, with an additional 18 delivered to Barcelona Tours during 2002.

Isle of Man Transport was also an export operator of both variants of the Lolyne, taking delivery of eleven original Lolynes between 2000 and 2001. followed by fourteen Myllennium Loylnes delivered between 2004 and 2006.

== Gallery ==
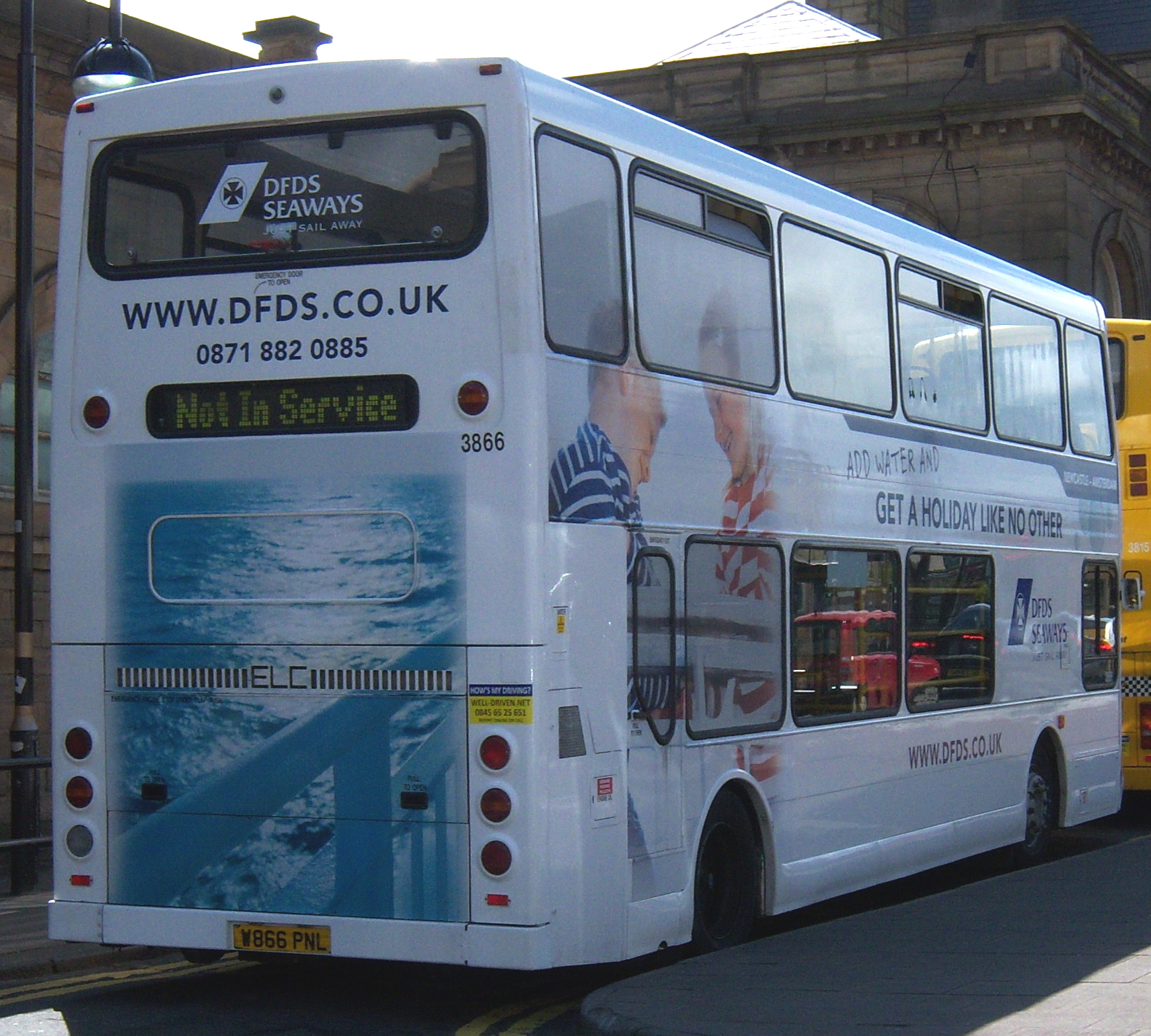
Rear of DFDS Seaways liveried Go North East East Lancs Lolyne-bodied Dennis Trident 2 in Newcastle

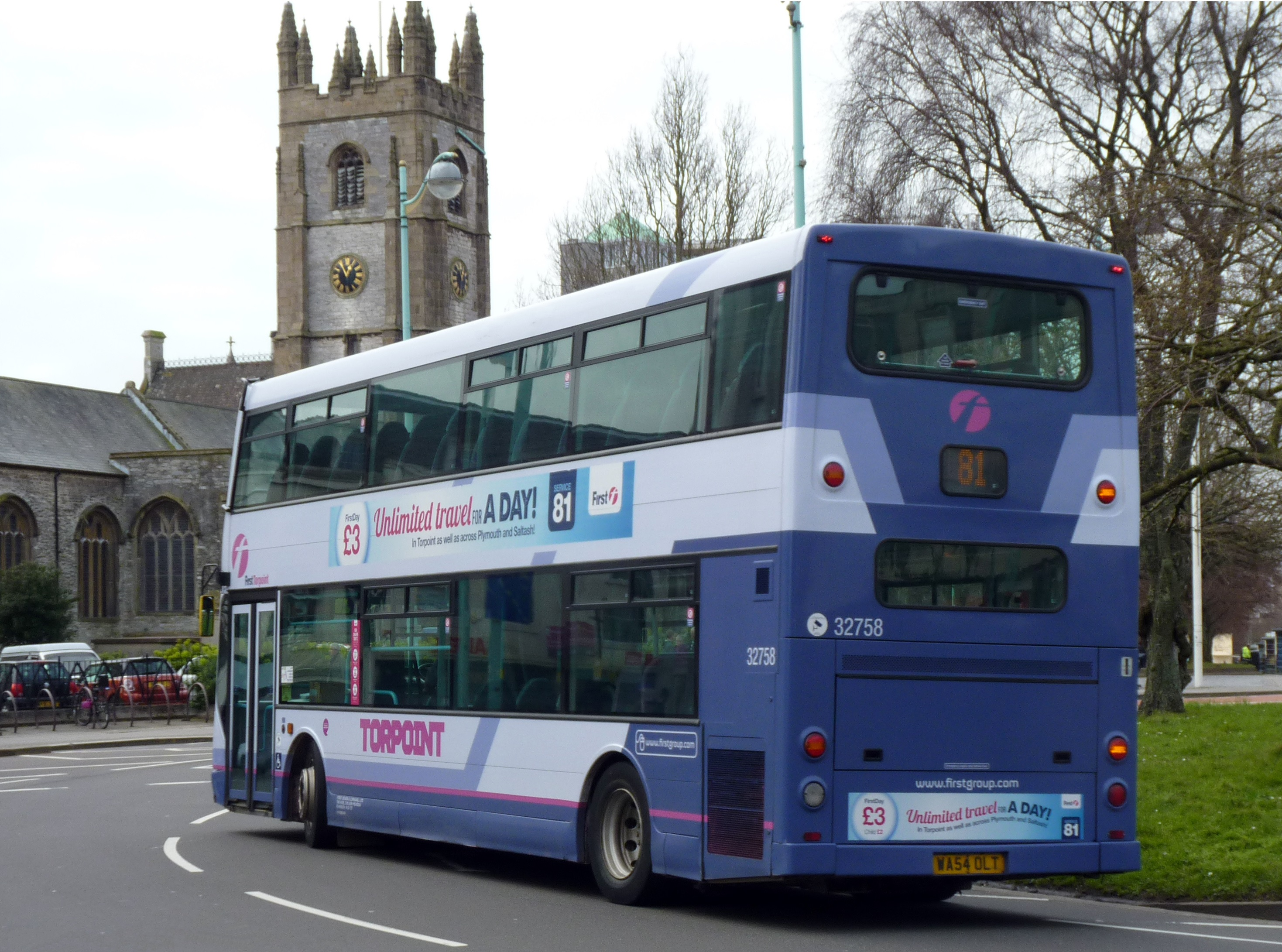
First Devon & Cornwall East Lancs Myllennium Lolyne bodied Dennis Trident 2 in Plymouth in March 2014

== See also ==
- List of buses
