= BrightBus =

Bus operator in South Yorkshire, England

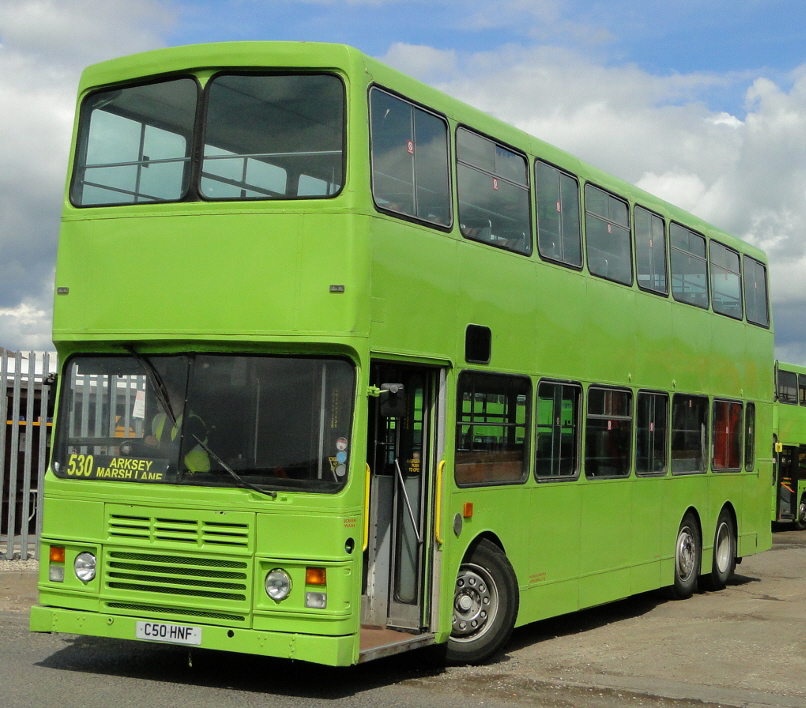
- Alexander RH bodied Leyland Olympian in May 2011
- Parent: Michael Strafford
- Founded: May 1998
- Ceased operation: July 2017
- Headquarters: North Anston
- Service area: South Yorkshire
- Service type: Bus services
- Depots: 2
- Fleet: 52 (May 2017)
- Website: www.brightbus.net

BrightBus was a bus operator in South Yorkshire that traded from 1998 until 2017.

== History ==
BrightBus was founded in May 1998 by Michael Strafford as an engineering business, performing contract maintenance for other operators. It also specialised in the conversion of buses for non-passenger use. It then diversified into the operation of school bus services. It ceased trading in July 2017 when the owner retired suffering ill health. At the time operations ceased it operated 86 routes serving 32 schools.

== Former operations ==
Between 2001 and 2005, Brightbus, then known as Mass Transit, had a substantial presence in Lincolnshire, following the acquisition of the bus operations of Applebys Coaches, Reliance Travel of Great Gonerby and the Grantham depot of RoadCar. The Grantham operation failed under Mass ownership and was sold to Centrebus, and the Lincoln area operations to Dunn-Line in 2005.

In 2004, BrightBus purchased the long established Leon Motors of Finningley that was formed in 1922 and operated buses in Doncaster. By 2008 the company's stage-carriage work had passed to First South Yorkshire and the remaining operations were integrated into the main BrightBus depot at North Anston.

== Fleet ==
As at May 2017, BrightBus operated a fleet of 73 buses, including many English built three-axle Dennis Dragons and Leyland Olympians repatriated from Hong Kong.
