= List of bus types used in London =

This is a list of current and former bus types used by bus operators in London throughout the 20th and 21st centuries, with their year of first introduction.

== Current ==
=== Alexander Dennis ===
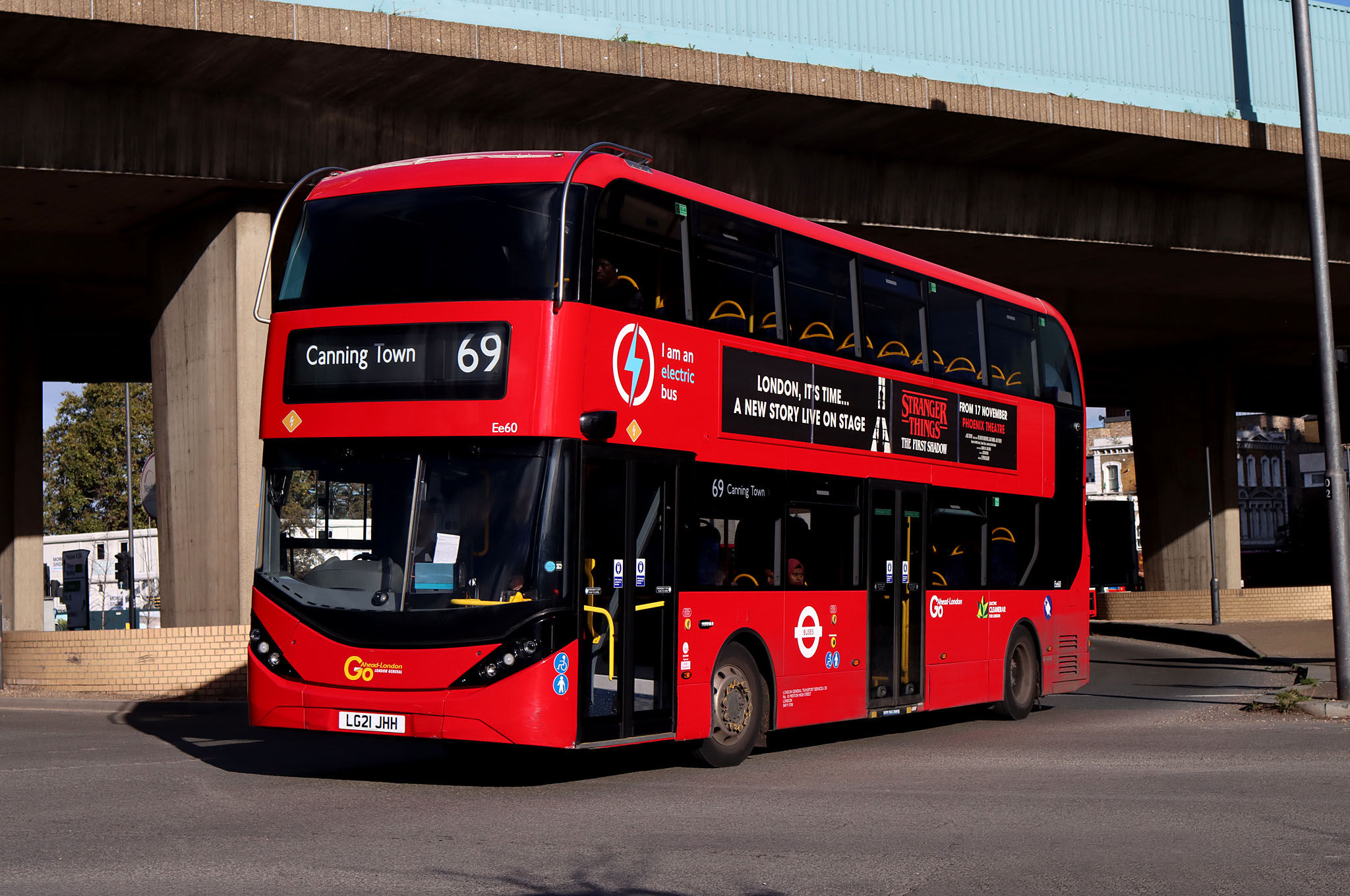
Blue Triangle BYD Alexander Dennis Enviro400 EV in November 2023

- Alexander Dennis Enviro200 (2006)
- Alexander Dennis Enviro400 (2006)
- Alexander Dennis Enviro400H (2008)
- Alexander Dennis Enviro400H City (2015)
- Alexander Dennis Enviro200 MMC (2015)
- Alexander Dennis Enviro400 MMC (2015)
- BYD Alexander Dennis Enviro200EV (2015)
- BYD Alexander Dennis Enviro400EV (2018)
- Alexander Dennis Enviro100EV (2025)
- Alexander Dennis Enviro400EV (2025)

=== BYD ===
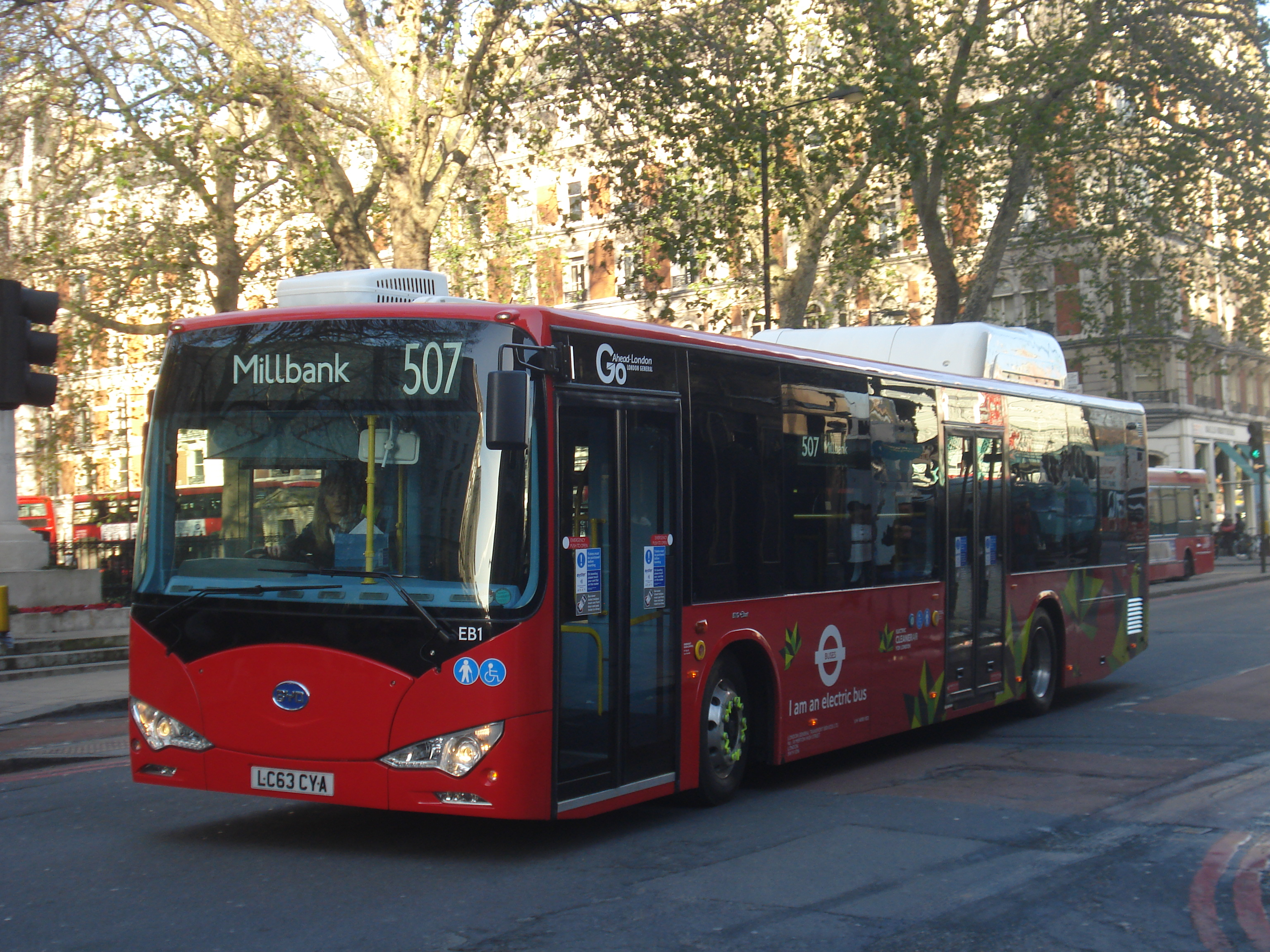
The BYD K series bus, the first electric bus to operate in london

- BYD K8SR (2016)
- BYD BD11 (2024)
- BYD B10 (2026)
- BYD B11 (2026)

=== MCV ===
- MCV EvoSeti (2016)
- MCV C093 EV / MCV C103 EV (2024)
- MCV D113 EV (2024)

=== Optare/Switch Mobility ===
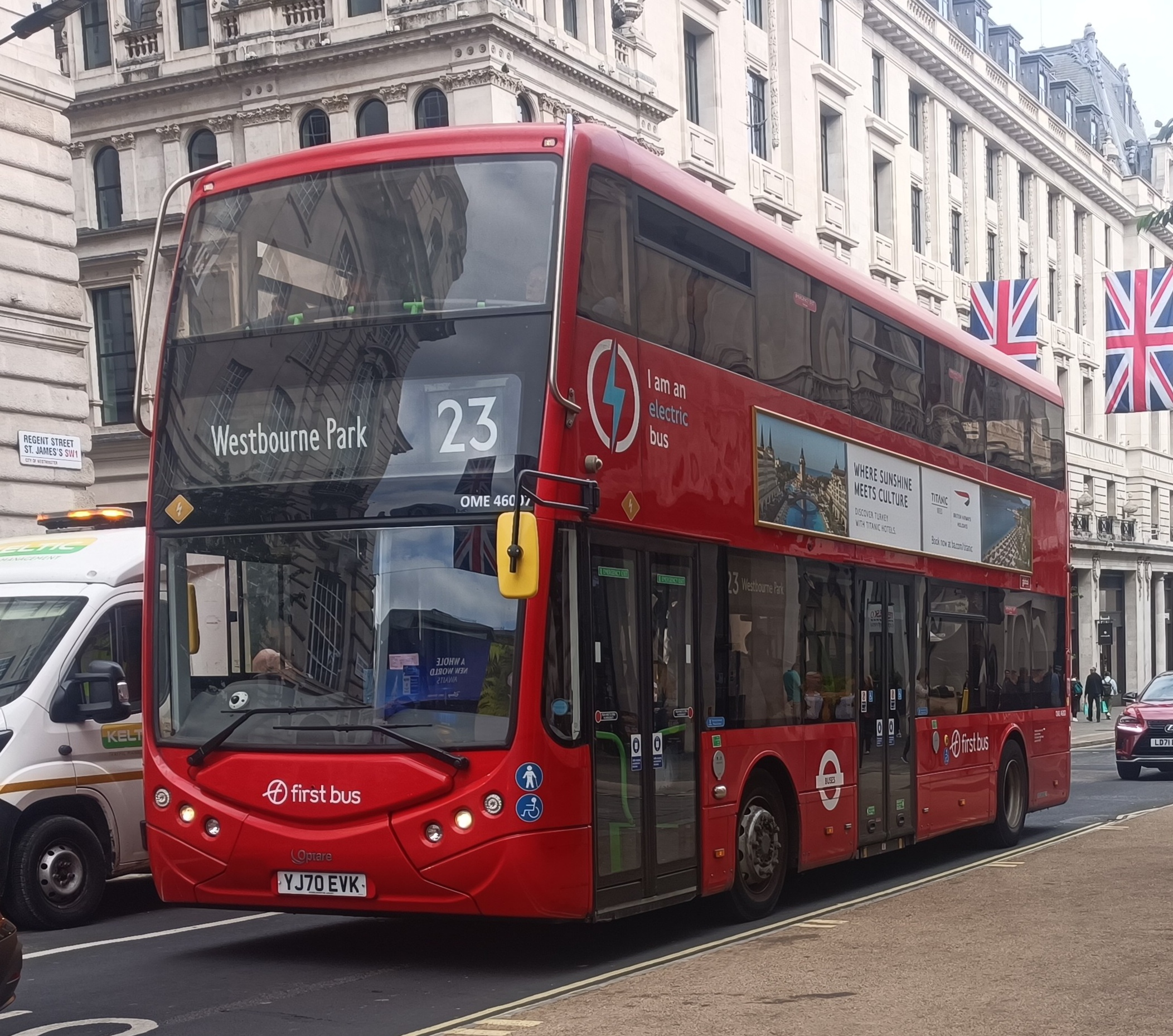
First Bus London Optare MetroDecker in May 2025

- Optare Solo SR (2012)
- Switch Metrocity EV (2014)
- Optare MetroDecker EV (2019)

=== VDL ===
- VDL DB300 (Wright Gemini 2 DL body) (2009)

=== Volvo ===
- Volvo B9TL (Alexander Dennis Enviro400 / Wright Eclipse Gemini / Wright Eclipse Gemini 2 / Optare Visionaire body) (2006)
- Volvo B5LH (Alexander Dennis Enviro400 MMC / MCV EvoSeti / Wright Eclipse Gemini / Wright Eclipse Gemini 2 / Wright Eclipse Gemini 3 / Wright Gemini 3 body) (2008)
- Volvo BZL (MCV C093 EV / MCV C103 EV body) (2024)
- Volvo BZL (MCV D113 EV body) (2024)

=== Wrightbus ===
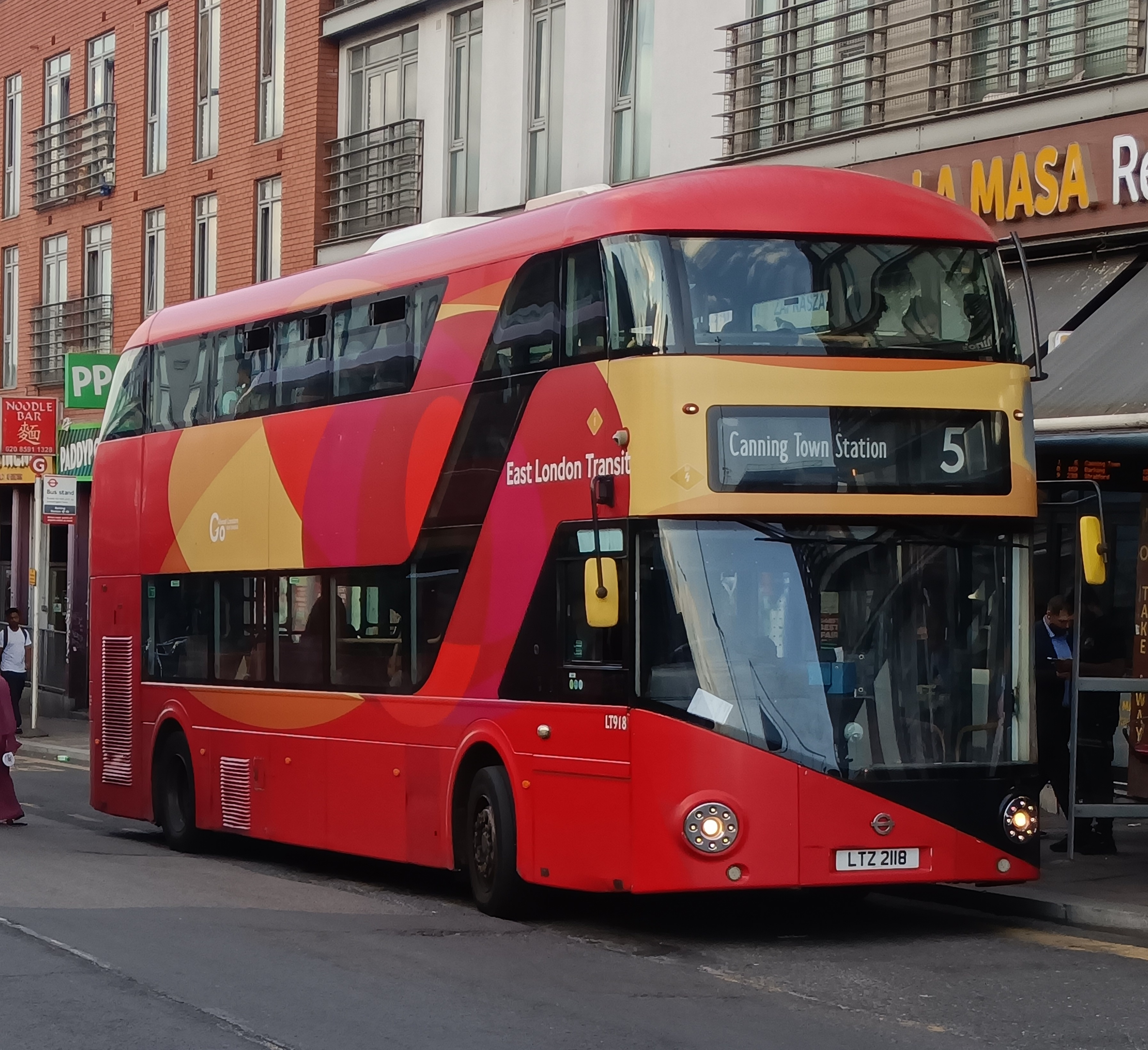
The New Routemaster, introduced in 2012.

- Wright StreetLite (2012)
- New Routemaster (2012)
- Wright StreetDeck / Wright StreetDeck HEV (2014 / 2018)
- Wright SRM (2016)
- Wright Eclipse Gemini (2001–2019)
- Wright StreetDeck Hydroliner (2021)
- Wright StreetDeck Electroliner (2023)
- Wright GB Kite Electroliner (2024)

=== Other ===
- Mercedes-Benz Citaro (2002)
- Caetano e.City Gold (2020)
- Irizar ie tram (2024)

== Former ==
=== LGOC ===
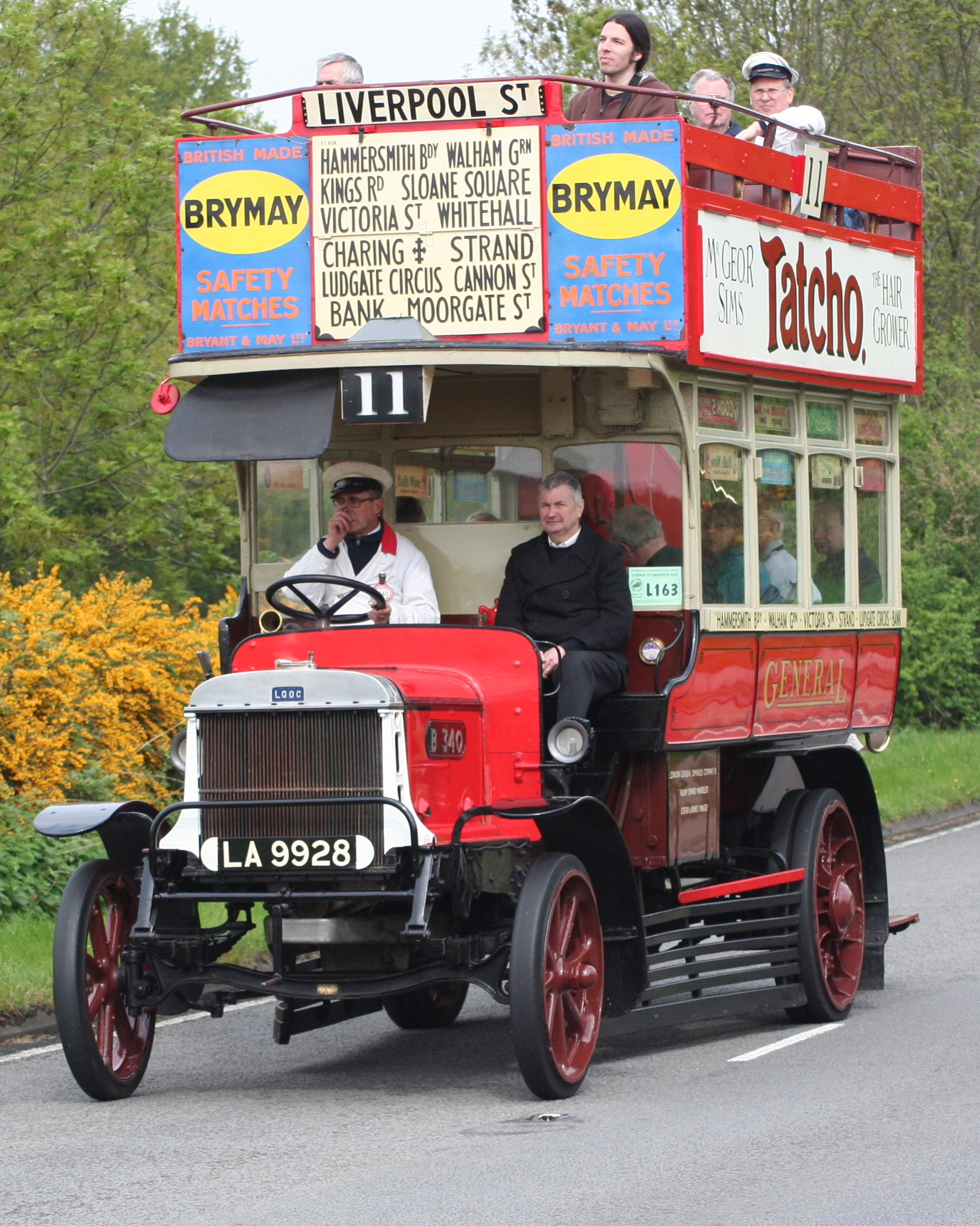
The LGOC B-type is a model of double-decker bus that was introduced in London on 1910. It was both built and operated by the London General Omnibus Company (LGOC).

- LGOC X-type (1909)
- LGOC B-type (1910)

=== AEC ===
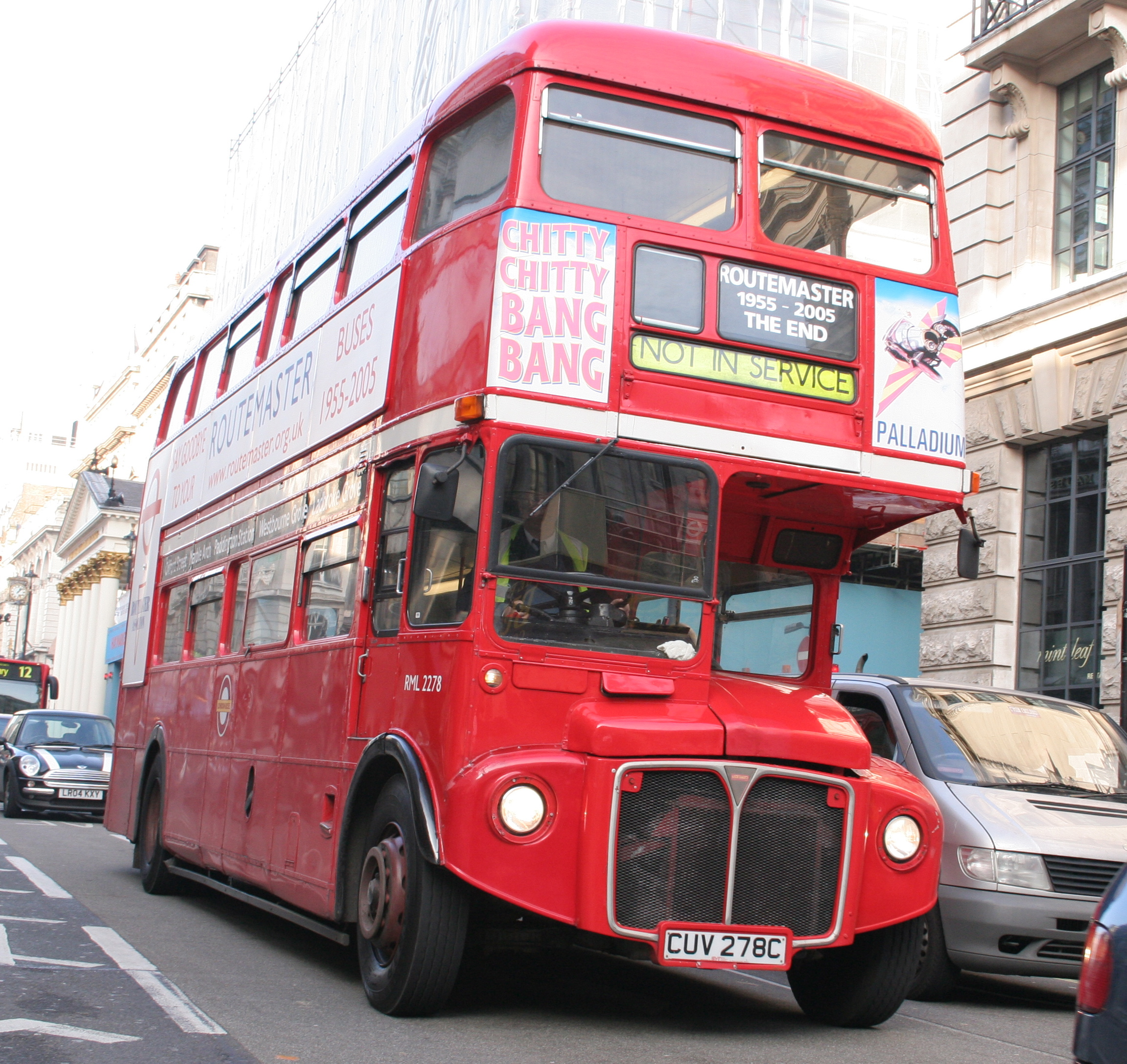
Arguably the most famous of them all, the AEC Routemaster serviced London for over 50 years before being retired from general use.

- AEC K-type (1919)
- AEC S-type (1920)
- AEC T-type (1920)
- AEC NS-type (1922)
- Regal (1929)
- AEC Regent I (1929)
- AEC LT-type (1929)
- AEC ST-type (1929)
- AEC Q-type (1932)
- AEC Regent III RT (1939)
- AEC Regent II (1945)
- Regal III (1947)
- AEC Regent III (1947)
- AEC Regal IV (1949)
- AEC Routemaster (1954)
- AEC Merlin / AEC Swift (1964)

=== Leyland ===
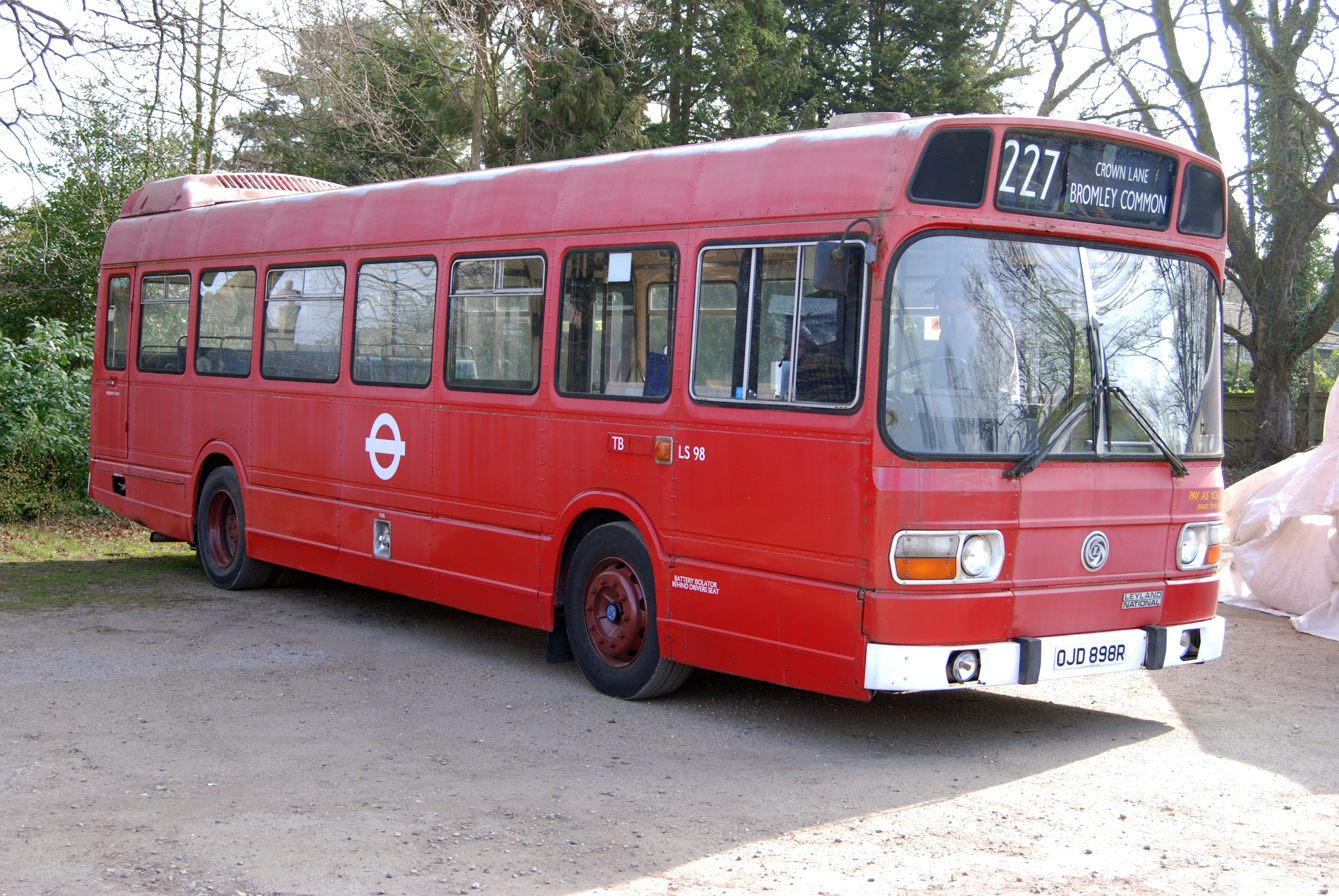
An ex-London Regional Transport Leyland National. Designed for the National Bus Company, it eventually proved highly popular outside of the company.

- Leyland Atlantean (1965)
- Leyland National (1972)
- Leyland Olympian (1984)
- Leyland Tiger (1927)
- Leyland Titan (1927)
- Leyland Titan (B15) (1978)

=== Alexander Dennis ===
- Dennis Dart (Plaxton Pointer / Carlyle Works body) (1989)
- Dennis Dart SLF (Plaxton Pointer / Alexander ALX200 / Caetano Nimbus / MCV Evolution / East Lancs Myllennium body) (1995)
- Dennis Lance / Dennis Lance SLF (1991 / 1993)
- Dennis Trident 2 (Alexander ALX400 / East Lancs Lolyne / Plaxton President body) (1999)

=== MAN ===
- MAN 12.240 (MCV Evolution / East Lancs Esteem body) (2007)
- MAN 14.240 (MCV Evolution / Alexander Dennis Enviro200 body) (2007)

=== MCV ===
- MCV Evolution (2006)

=== MCW ===
- MCW Metrobus (1978)
- MCW Metrorider (1987)

=== Optare/Switch Mobility ===
- Optare Excel (1996)
- Optare MetroRider (1989)
- Optare Delta (1990)
- Optare Solo (1998)
- Optare Tempo (2009)
- Optare Versa (2010)
- Optare MetroCity / Optare MetroCity EV (2014)

=== Scania ===
- Scania Metropolitan (1976)
- Scania N113CRL (Wright Pathfinder body) (1992)
- Scania N113DRB (1993)
- Scania N94UD (East Lancs OmniDekka / Scania OmniCity body) (2003)
- Scania N230UD (East Lancs OmniDekka / East Lancs Olympus / Scania OmniCity body) (2007)
- Scania OmniTown (Scania OmniTown / East Lancs Myllennium / East Lancs Esteem) (2003)

=== VDL ===
- VDL DB250 (Alexander ALX400 / Optare Spectra / Plaxton President / Wright Pulsar Gemini body)
- DAF SB120 / VDL SB120 (Wright Cadet / Wright Merit/Wright Electrocity / Wright Pulsar Hydrogen powered body)

=== Volvo ===
- Volvo Ailsa B55 (1983)
- Volvo B6 (1992)
- Volvo B7L / Ayats Bravo (2004)
- Volvo B7TL (Alexander ALX400 / East Lancs Myllennium Vyking / Plaxton President / Wright Eclipse Gemini body) (1999)
- Volvo B10B (1993)
- Volvo Citybus
- Volvo Olympian (1993)

=== Wrightbus ===
- Wright Pulsar Gemini (2003)
- Wright StreetAir (2017)

=== Other ===
- Bristol LH (1975)
- DAF SB220 (East Lancs Myllennium / Optare Delta body) (1989)
- Daimler Fleetline (1979)

== See also ==
- Buses in London
- List of bus routes in London
