= Darwen Group =

Former bus manufacturer

- Industry: Bus building
- Headquarters: Blackburn, Lancashire, England
- Products: Bus bodies
- Website: Official website (archive copy)

The Darwen Group was a bus manufacturer located in Blackburn, Lancashire, England. The company originated from the purchase of East Lancashire Coachbuilders who went into administration in August 2007. After a series of developments, in June 2008 Darwen performed a reverse takeover with the then bus manufacturer Optare (now Switch Mobility), with the Darwen name disappearing.

== History ==
Darwen rose from the ashes of East Lancashire Coachbuilders in August 2007, after they went into administration - Darwen saved them the next day. Darwen went about reorganising the business, making a number of redundancies and rebranding main bus side of the business as Darwen East Lancs, the repair arm as Darwen North West. The current East Lancs products at the time were continued by Darwen, with new brand names.

This was followed by the acquisition of Leyland Product Developments in November 2007, which was rebranded as Darwen LPD. Further progress came in February 2008, when the parent company Darwen Holdings floated on Alternative Investment Market.

In a further development, the Darwen Group owner Roy Stanley set up Jamesstan Investments, and on 12 March 2008 the Optare Group was purchased. In June 2008 the decision was made for Darwen to perform a reverse takeover on Optare under Jamesstan Investments. The Darwen name was dropped in favour of Optare's.

The company has also announced its intention to develop integral buses, with a prototype due by June 2008. It intends to develop both hybrid and diesel versions, the hybrid in partnership with Enova.

On 14 July 2008 the company was renamed Optare UK Ltd as a part of the reverse takeover of Optare.

== Products ==
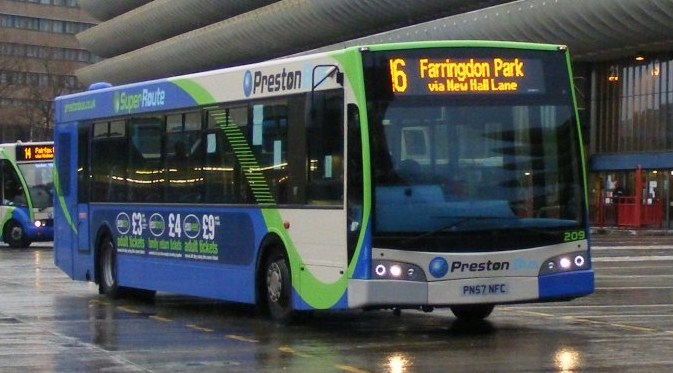
An Esteem run by Preston Bus.

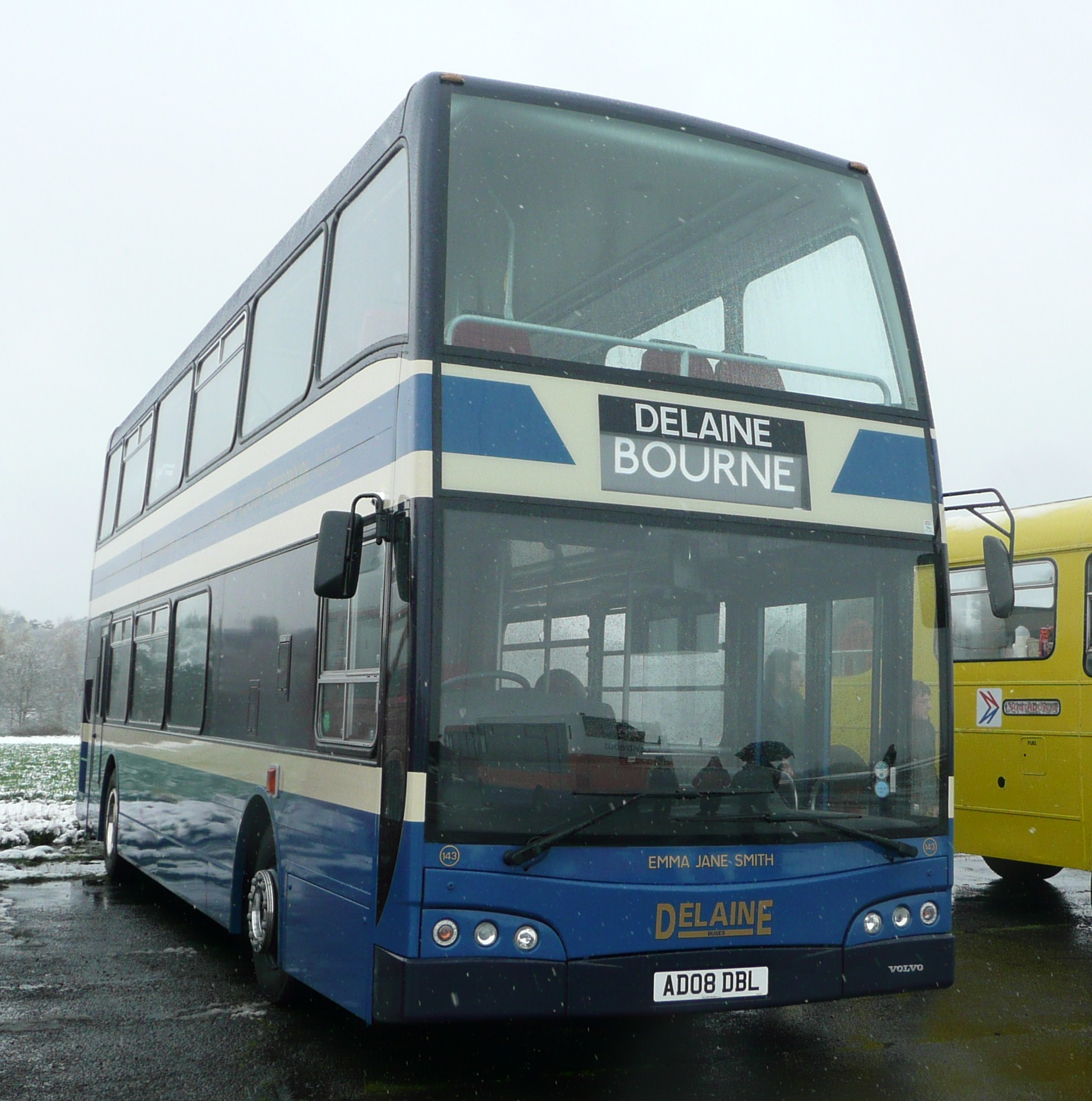
An Olympus run by Delaine.

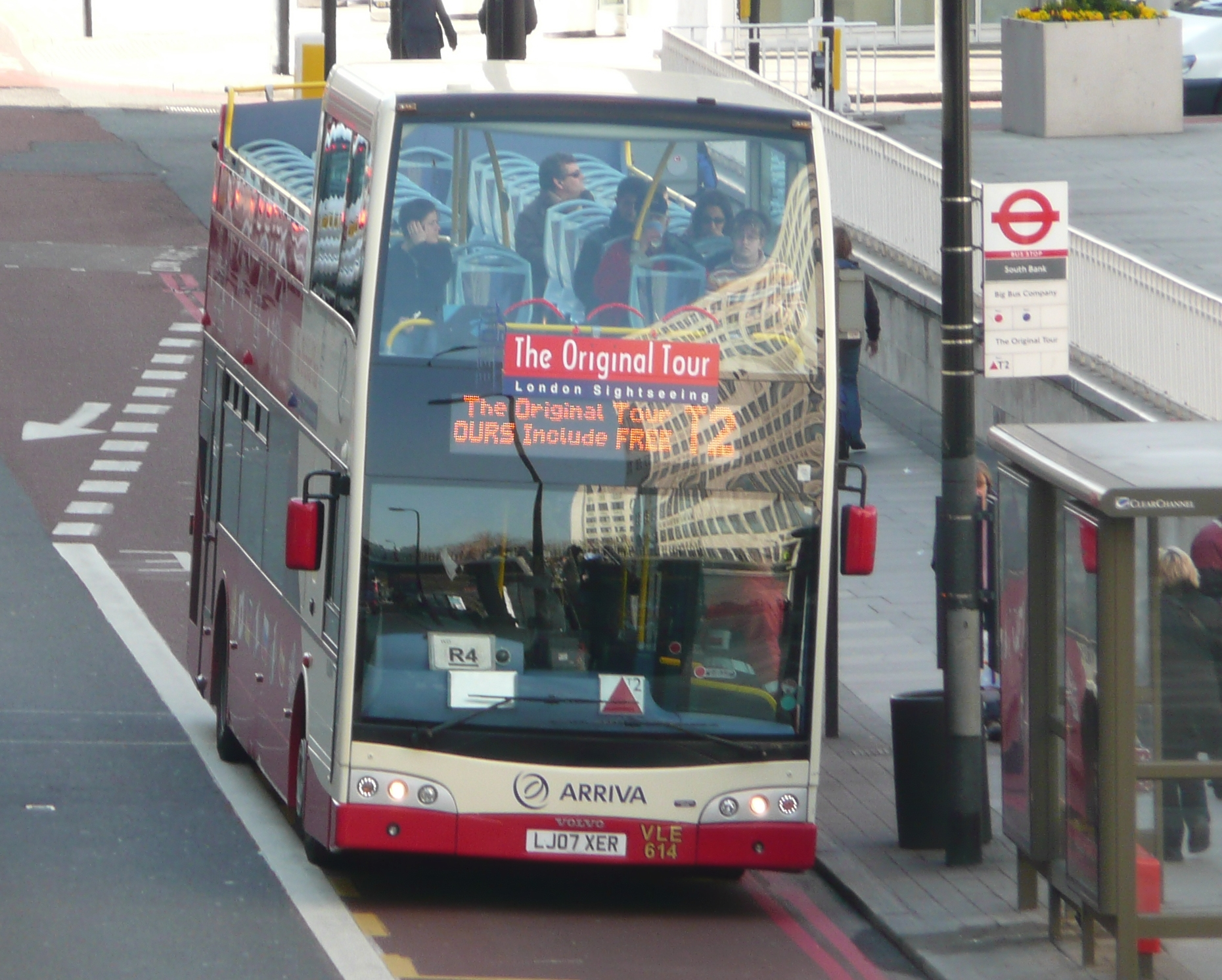
A Visionaire run by The Original Tour.

=== Single-decker ===
- Darwen Esteem

Built for the Alexander Dennis Enviro200 Dart, Scania N94UB Alexander Dennis Enviro300 and MAN 12.240 chassis. A former East Lancs product, previously known as the East Lancs Esteem. It is the successor to the East Lancs Myllennium.

- Darwen Panaire

This is a modified open-top Esteem. It is the only open-top single-decker bus offered in the UK although no orders were taken.

=== Double-decker ===
- Darwen OmniDekka

Built for the Scania N230UD/N270UD chassis. A former East Lancs product, known as the East Lancs Omnidekka. It is a replacement for the ELC Scania N94UD based model.

- Darwen Olympus

Built for the Volvo B9TL, Alexander Dennis Enviro400 and Scania N230UD/N270UD chassis. A former East Lancs product, known as the East Lancs Olympus. It is a modified version of the double-decker Myllennium with the same enhancements as the Esteem.

- Darwen Visionaire

Built so far on the Volvo B9TL chassis. A former East Lancs product, known as the East Lancs Visionaire. It is essentially an open top version of the Olympus.
