= Optare Olympus =

Double-decker bus

East Lancs Olympus
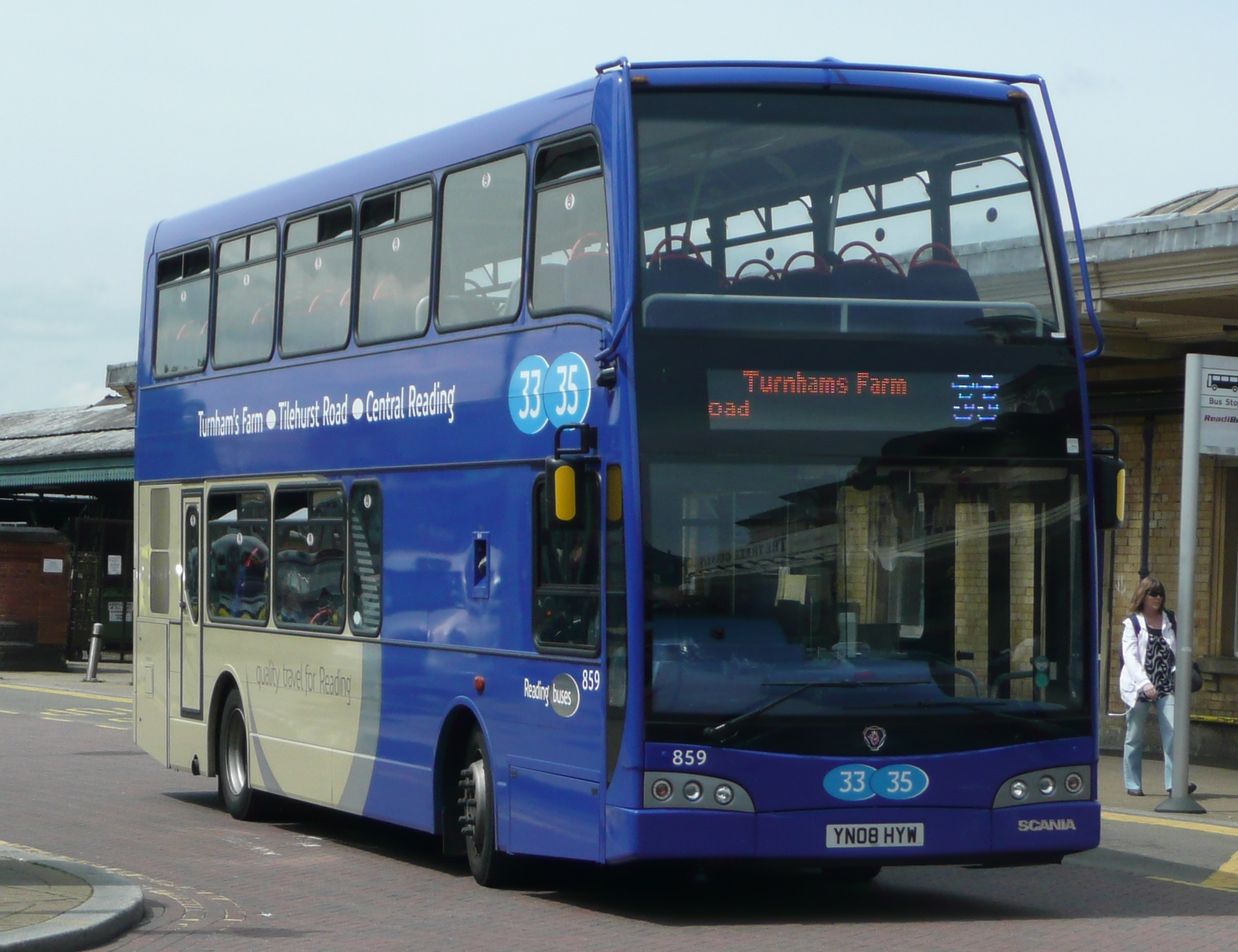
- A Reading Buses Olympus, an example bodied by Darwen Group.

Overview
- Manufacturer: East Lancashire Coachbuilders (2006-07); Darwen Group (2007-08); Optare (2008-11)
- Production: 2006–2011

Body and chassis
- Doors: 1 or 2
- Floor type: Low floor
- Chassis: Scania N230UD; Scania N270UD; Volvo B9TL (2 or 3 axle); Dennis Trident 2
- Related: Scania OmniDekka; Optare Visionaire; Optare Esteem

Powertrain
- Capacity: 68 - 100 seated

Dimensions
- Length: 10.2 to 11.9 m (33 ft 5 5/8 in to 39 ft 1/2 in)
- Width: 2,535 mm (8 ft 3 3/4 in)
- Height: 4.2 to 4.3 m (13 ft 9 3/8 in to 14 ft 1 1/4 in)

Chronology
- Predecessor: East Lancs Myllennium Lolyne; East Lancs Myllennium Lowlander; East Lancs Myllennium Nordic; East Lancs Myllennium Vyking
- Successor: Switch Metrodecker

The East Lancs Olympus (renamed Darwen Olympus before being renamed to Optare Olympus after ELC was acquired by Optare in 2008) is a double-decker bus built by East Lancs, Optare and Darwen. It could be built as a body available on Alexander Dennis Enviro400, Volvo B9TL or Scania N230UD/N270UD chassis with the 2-axle and 3-axle variants. It is the double-decker equivalent of the Optare Esteem. Some 3-axle Olympus buses were built.

== History ==
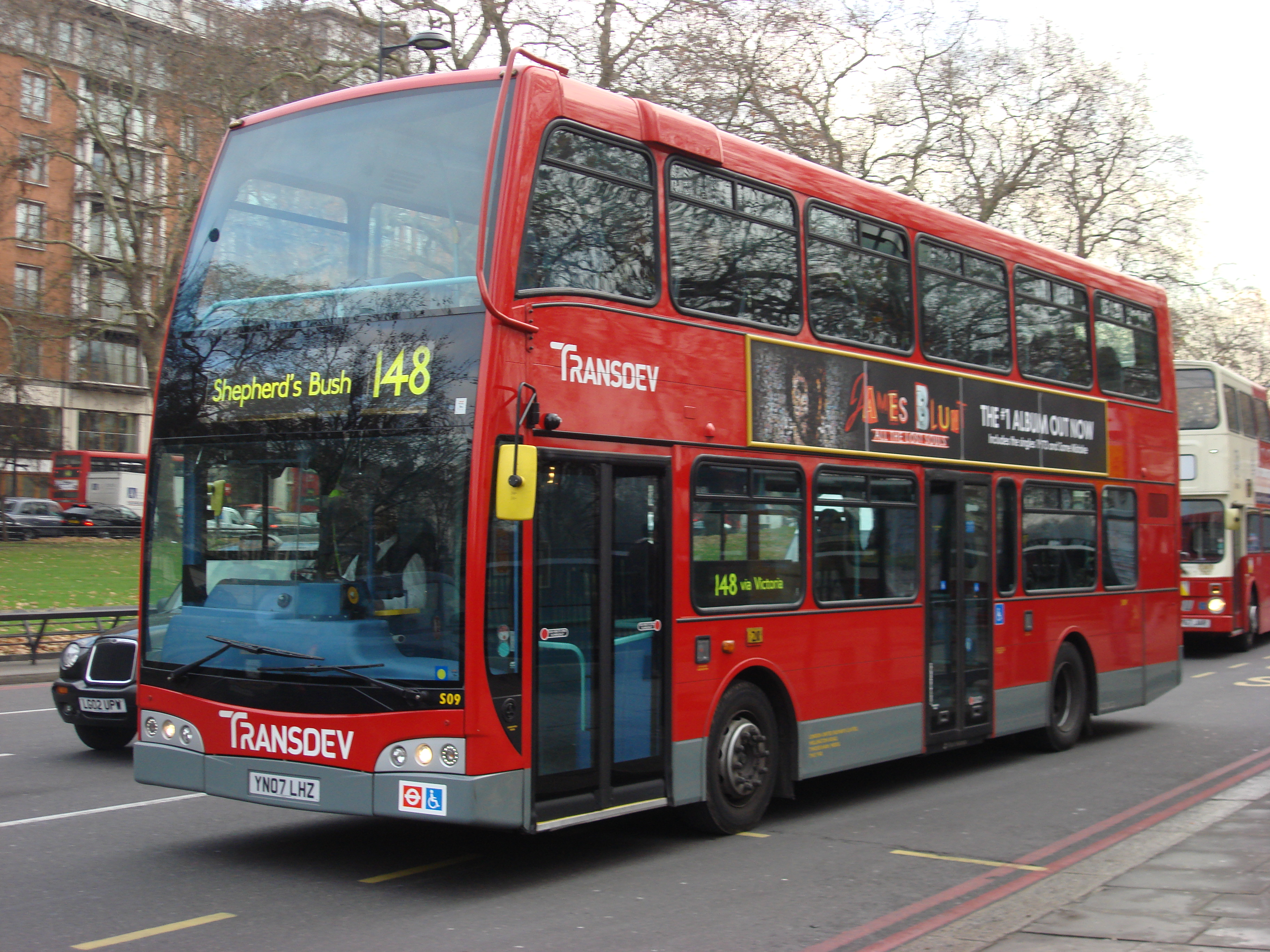
A Transdev London East Lancs Olympus on a Scania N UD chassis

The Olympus was launched by East Lancashire Coachbuilders in November 2006. The first example, built on a Volvo B9TL chassis for Delaine Buses, was displayed at Euro Bus Expo 2006. It had been the intention to exhibit a higher specification model for Ham's of Flimwell, but this was not ready in time for the show, meaning the bus didn't show its full potential.

The Olympus replaced the OmniDekka on Scania chassis (though was still sold alongside the bus until 2011), which is 10.6 or 11.9 metres in length. On Volvo chassis, it replaced the Myllennium Vyking and the Myllennium Nordic. On Alexander Dennis chassis, it replaced the Myllennium Lolyne.

At the beginning of January 2007, Reading Buses ordered six Olympus with Scania chassis for their Loddon Bridge FastTrack park and ride contract to replace Optare Excels. They entered service in a yellow and blue livery in July 2007.

In London, some bus operators purchased Olympus with Scania chassis. Transdev London and Metroline had these buses operating on routes 148, 7, 90 and 297 respectively. Due to problems with the new Transport for London specified air-conditioning units, some buses failed the tilt test by one degree, and entered service late.

=== Acquisition by Darwen ===
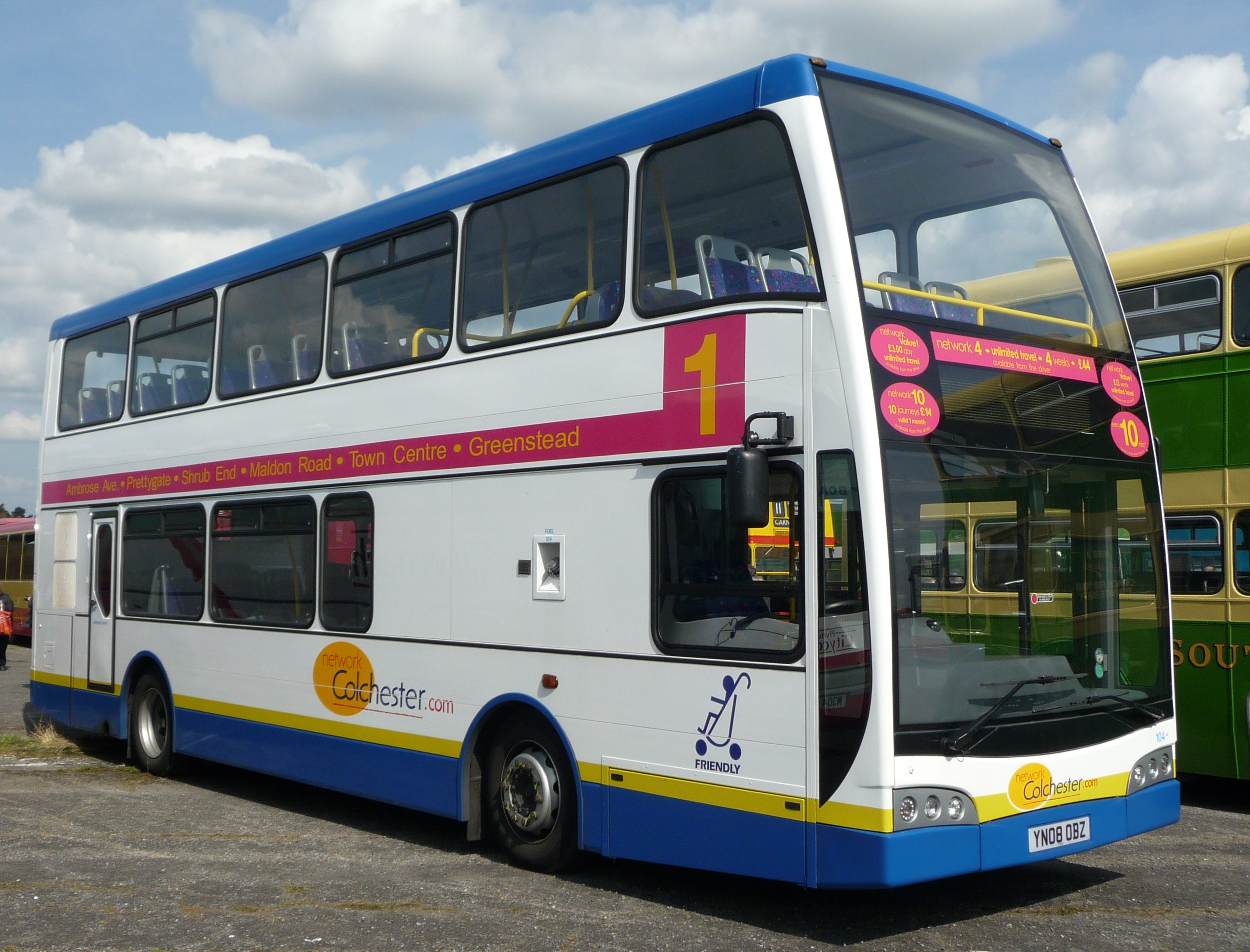
A Network Colchester Darwen Olympus on a Scania N230UD chassis

East Lancashire Coachbuilders went into administration in August 2007 and was bought by the Darwen Group. The body was therefore renamed Darwen Olympus.

The first buses to be delivered under the Darwen name were those ordered by Cardiff Bus (one of which was shown at Coach and Bus live 2007) and Arriva Yorkshire.

Reading Buses has numerous examples bodied by Darwen, in addition to a few built by East Lancs before they went into administration.

=== Reverse takeover by Optare ===
Following the reverse takeover of Optare by Darwen Group in June 2008, the Olympus was again renamed, becoming the Optare Olympus. London General ordered the Olympus with Alexander Dennis Enviro400 chassis instead of Scania which Metroline and Transdev London had inherited. These buses have since largely been withdrawn, and moved to other Go Ahead operators such as Bluestar, East Yorkshire and Go North East.

Metrobus have 30 buses on Scania N230UD chassis, which were used on London routes 54 and 75.

In 2009, Optare announced that it had designed its own chassis for the Optare Olympus, with a Mercedes-Benz engine, as per previous products. A single prototype integral Olympus, designated the Olympus O1030, was built; this later became the basis for the new Optare MetroDecker and was subsequently launched in 2014.

== Open top variant ==
An open-top double-decker bus version of the Olympus, named the Visionaire, was also built. Like the Olympus, it was also built on the same chassis.

== Gallery ==
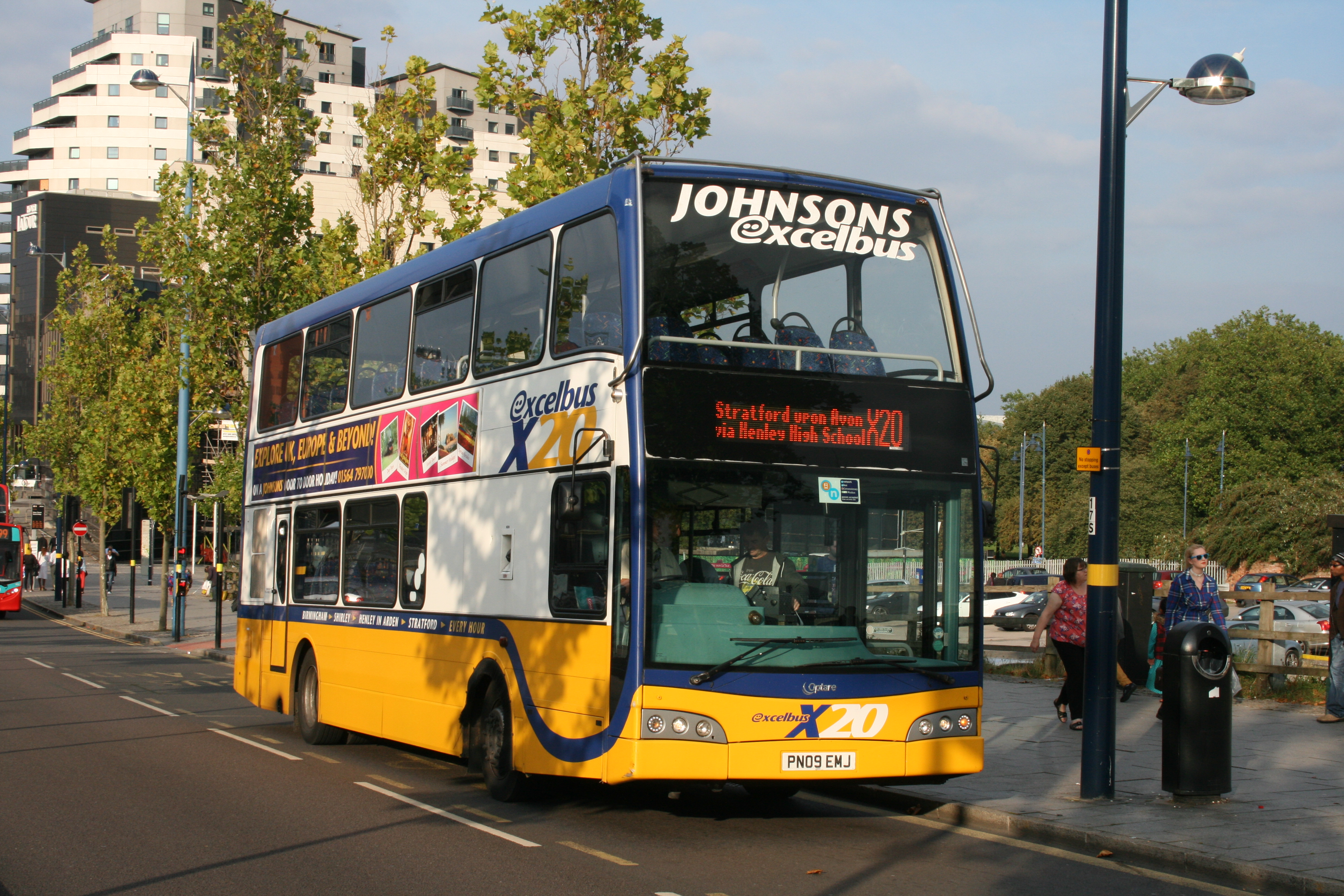
Excelbus' Olympus with the Scania N230UD chassis

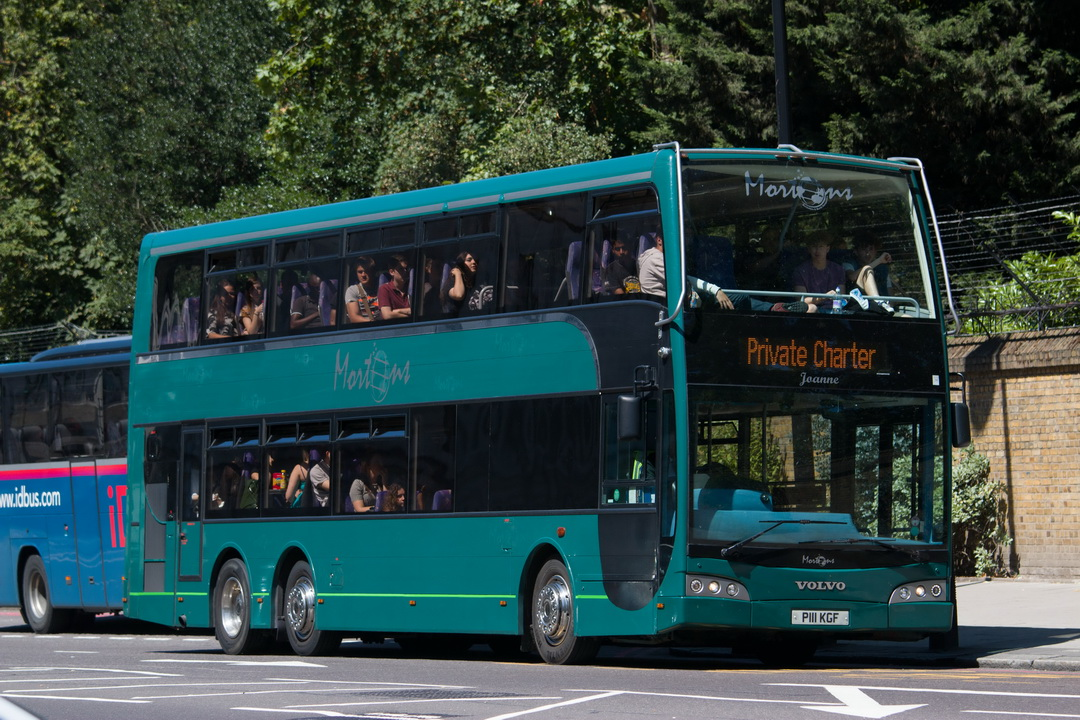
Mortons Travel's Olympus with the Volvo B9TL chassis

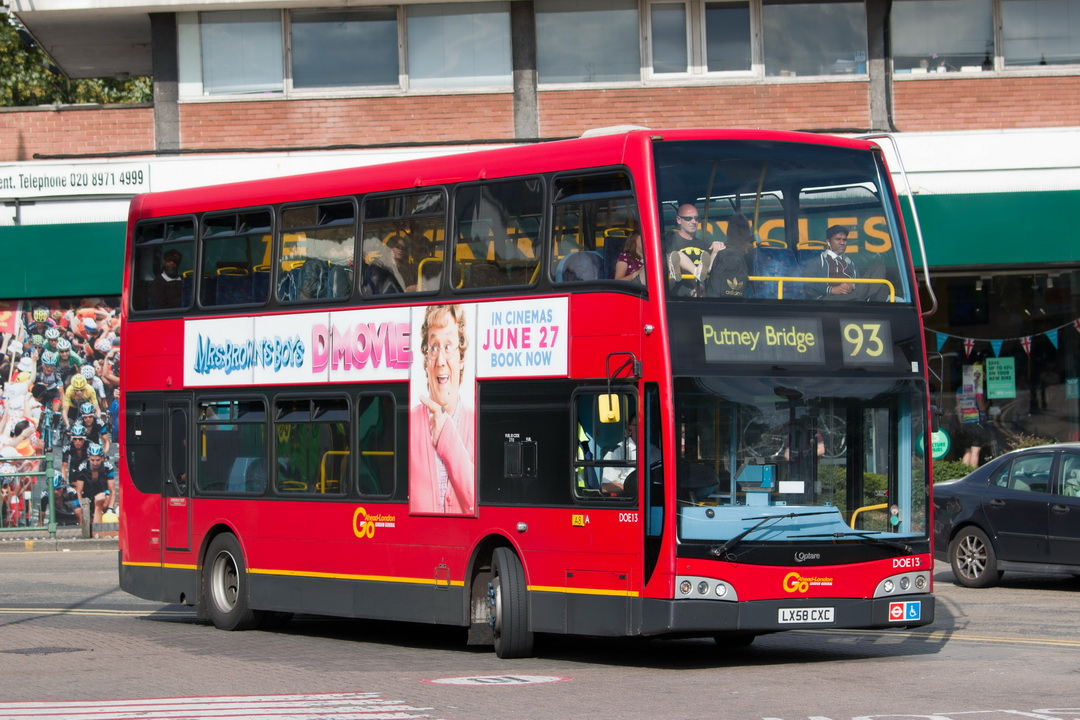
London General's Olympus with the Enviro400 chassis

== See also ==
- List of buses

Competitors

- Alexander Dennis Enviro400
- Wright Eclipse Gemini
