= Optare Esteem =

Low-floor single-decker bus body

East Lancs / Darwen / Optare Esteem
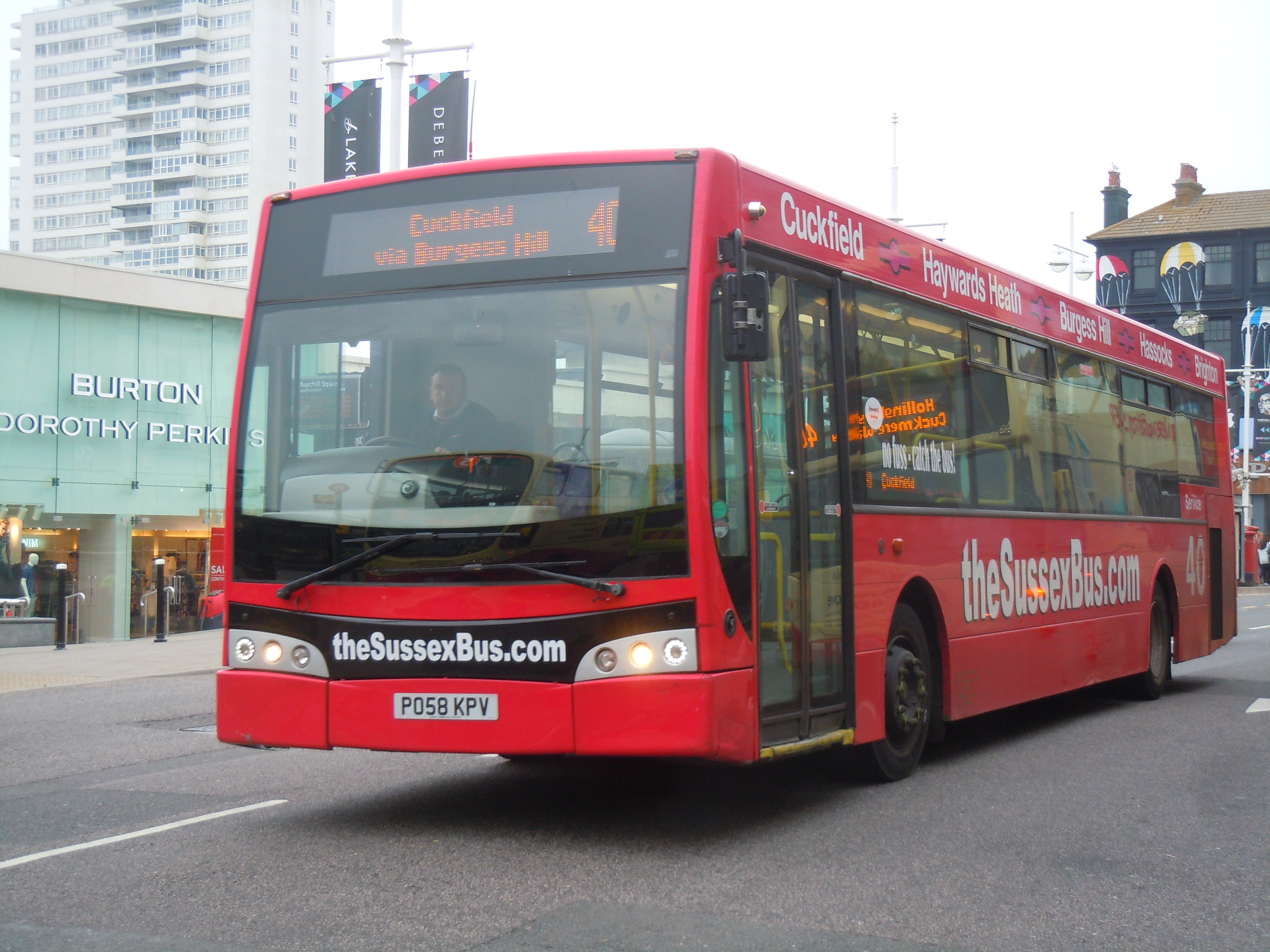
- The Sussex Bus Optare Esteem bodied Volvo B7RLE in Brighton in September 2014

Overview
- Manufacturer: East Lancashire Coachbuilders; Optare
- Production: 2006 - 2009
- Assembly: Blackburn

Body and chassis
- Doors: 1 or 2
- Floor type: Low floor
- Chassis: Scania N94UB; Scania N230UB; Volvo B7RLE; MAN 12.240; Alexander Dennis Dart SLF; Alexander Dennis Enviro200 Dart; Alexander Dennis Enviro300
- Related: Optare Olympus; Optare Visionaire

Powertrain
- Capacity: 33 - 43 seated

Dimensions
- Length: 10.7 to 12.2 metres
- Width: 2.52 metres
- Height: 2.90 metres

Chronology
- Predecessor: East Lancs Myllennium

The Optare Esteem was a low-floor single-decker bus body manufactured by East Lancashire Coachbuilders, Darwen East Lancs and Optare between 2006 and 2009 on Scania N94UB, Scania N230UB, Volvo B7RLE, MAN 12.240, Alexander Dennis Dart SLF, Alexander Dennis Enviro200 Dart and Alexander Dennis Enviro300 chassis.

== History ==
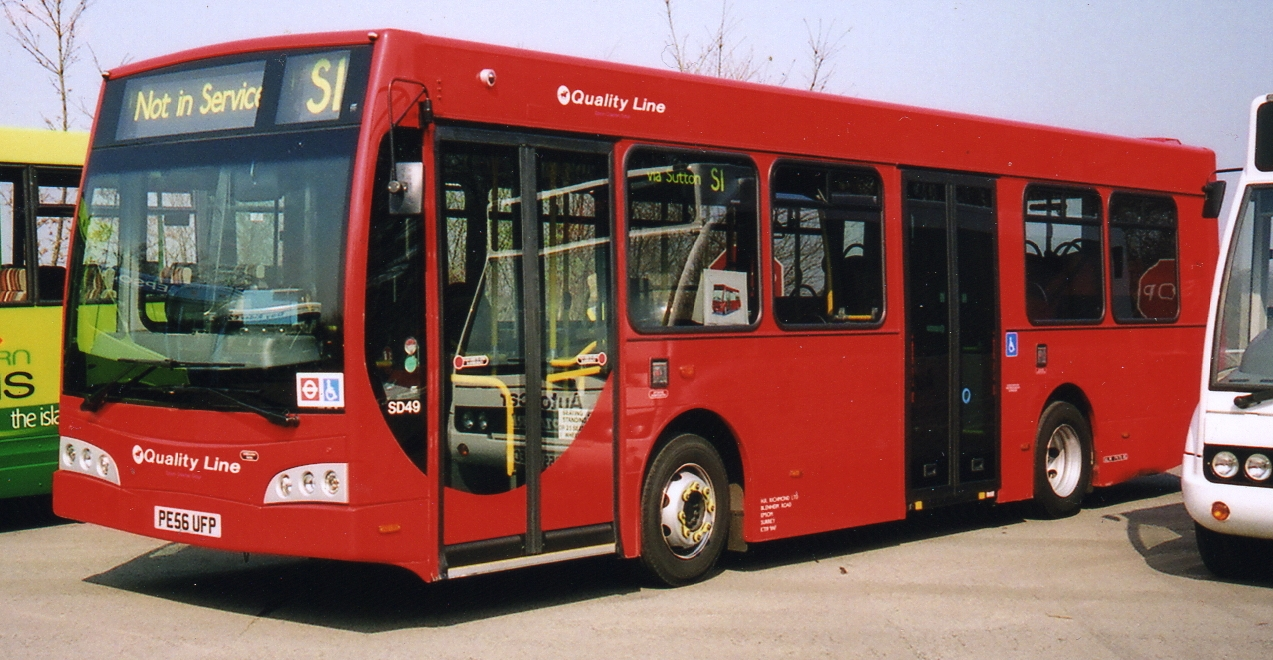
A Quality Line East Lancs Esteem bodied Alexander Dennis Enviro200 Dart. This is one of the early examples having sides of the older Myllennium style

The Esteem was launched by East Lancashire Coachbuilders in 2006. The first production examples entered service with Preston Bus in September 2006 on Scania N94UB chassis.

After East Lancashire Coachbuilders was placed in administration in August 2007, it was bought by Darwen Group and the Esteem was rebranded as the Darwen Esteem. In 2008, Darwen Group merged its Darwen East Lancs and Optare businesses under the latter name, resulting in the Esteem being rebranded again.

The first few examples of the Esteem only had new front and rear ends, the sides still being of the older Myllennium design. There were also two double-decker variants of this body - the Olympus that was a closed top double-decker and the Visionaire that was an open top double-decker.

Production of the Optare Esteem ceased in 2009, with the last being 40 built on Alexander Dennis Enviro200 Dart chassis for Go-Ahead London.

== Panaire ==
It was also planned for an open top version of the Esteem to be launched alongside, named the Panaire. This version of the bus never attracted any orders and was removed from the product list during the reverse takeover.

== Customers ==
Metrobus had the largest number of the original East Lancs Esteems, some of which were on Scania N94UB, Scania N230UB and MAN 12.240 chassis while 21 on Alexander Dennis Dart SLF chassis were purchased for Transport for London contracted routes. The first two Esteems to be built on the Alexander Dennis Enviro300 chassis were delivered to Courtney Coaches in 2006, and were the first Enviro300s with bodywork not built by Alexander Dennis.
