= Ayats Bravo =

Range of coaches manufactured by Ayats

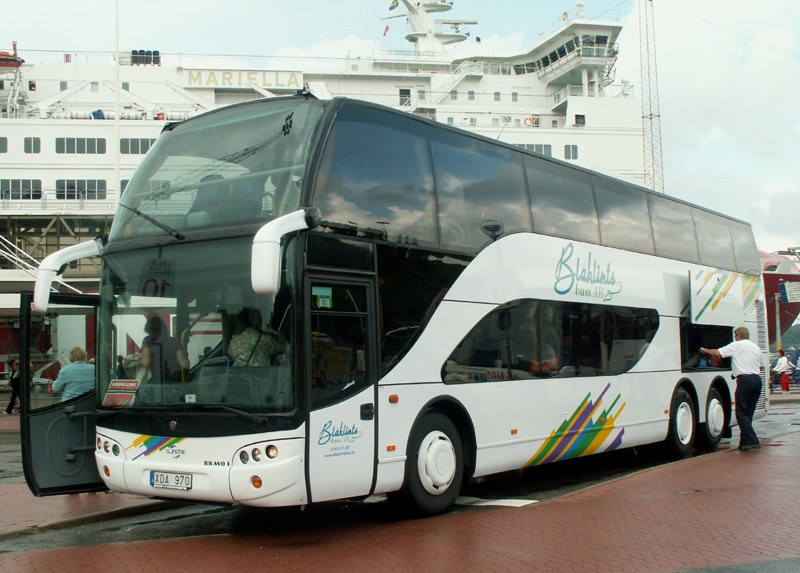
- Ayats Bravo 1 coach on a Scania chassis

Overview
- Manufacturer: Ayats

Body and chassis
- Doors: 1 door/2 doors
- Floor type: Low floor
- Chassis: Scania; Volvo

Powertrain
- Engine: Scania; Volvo

Dimensions
- Length: Bravo 1; 12m, 13.0m, 13.1m, 13.75m and 15m Bravo 2; 12m, 13.0m, 13.1m, 13.75m

The Ayats Bravo is a range of coaches manufactured by Ayats. There are four variants, the Bravo 1, Bravo 2, Bravo 3, and Bravo City, all featuring similar styling cues. They are custom manufactured in Spain to order, on a wide variety of chassis or as integral products.

== Bravo 1 ==
A tri-axle double-decker coach with a full-length upper deck. The lower deck extends to the rear axles. The length is dependent on the chassis ordered: 12m, 13.0m, 13.1m, 13.75m and 15m lengths are manufactured, although the 15m variant is not sold in the UK. Seating capacity is dependent on specification, with 89 a typical maximum for the 13.75m vehicle.

== Bravo 2 ==
A single deck coach with a large under-floor storage. Available in 2 or 3 axle variants, as per the Bravo 1 the length is dependent on the chassis ordered: 12m, 13.0m, 13.1m, 13.75m are available. Seating capacity is dependent on specification, with 65 a typical maximum for the 13.75m vehicle.

== Bravo 3 ==
The Bravo 3 (unofficial name) is identical to the 1 in construction and design, differing only in terms of the lower deck. The Bravo 3 features extensive luggage compartments to the rear, with the lower deck being significantly shorter, resulting in a lower maximum capacity of 75 for the 13.75m model.

== Bravo City ==
This double-decker bus borrows heavily from the designs of the coaches. It is a purpose-built open-top tour bus, first built for City Sightseeing since 2003 for all countries. Two variants are available, one with a completely open upper deck, and another with a small part of the front upper deck enclosed. Both designs feature a large, curved front window. The Bravo City is notable for being the first purpose-built open top tour bus with full disabled access, by means of a ramp fitted to the wide, low floor front entrance.

== Gallery ==
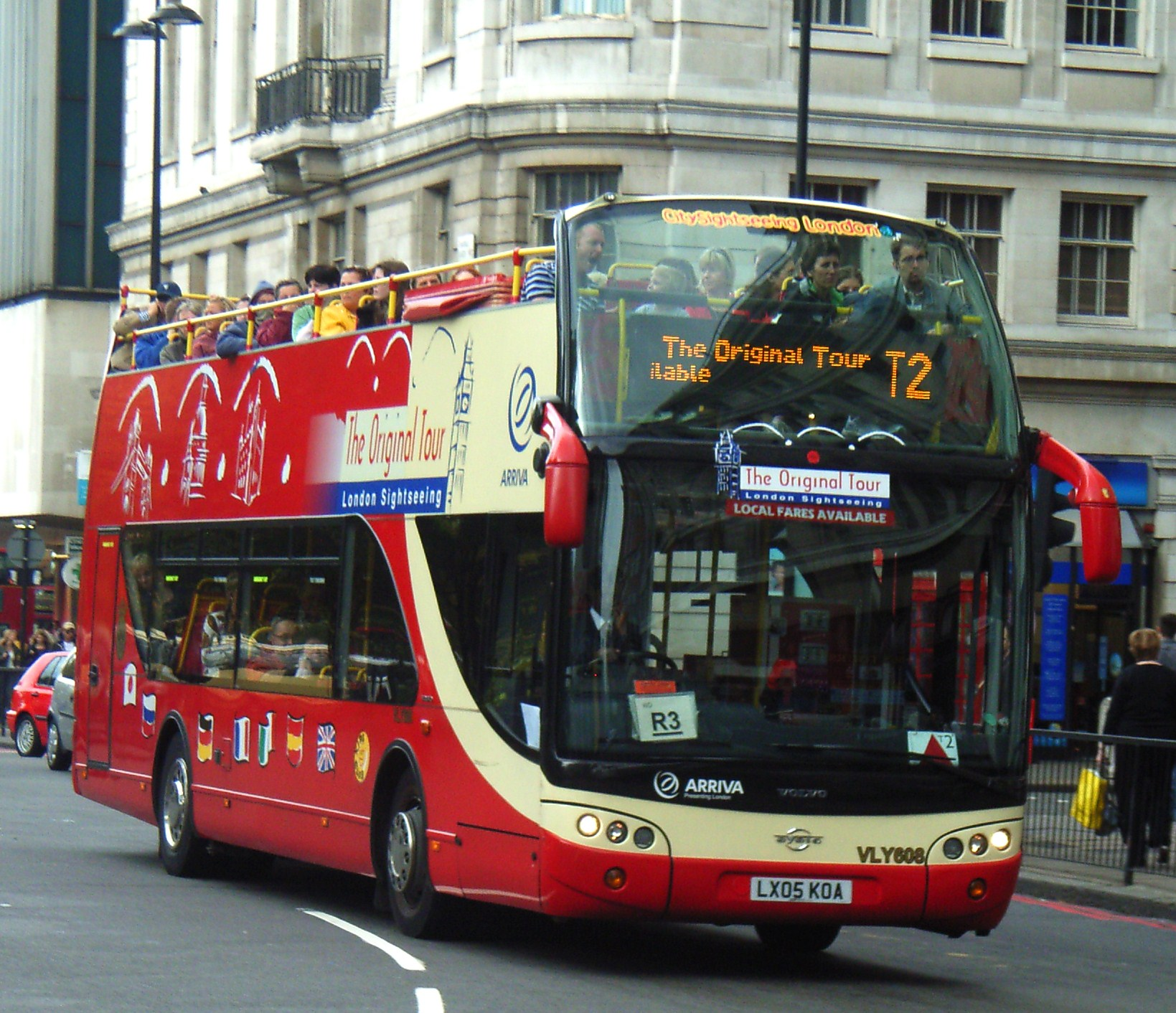
A Bravo City bodied on a Volvo B7L chassis, in the colours of The Original Tour for use in London, UK

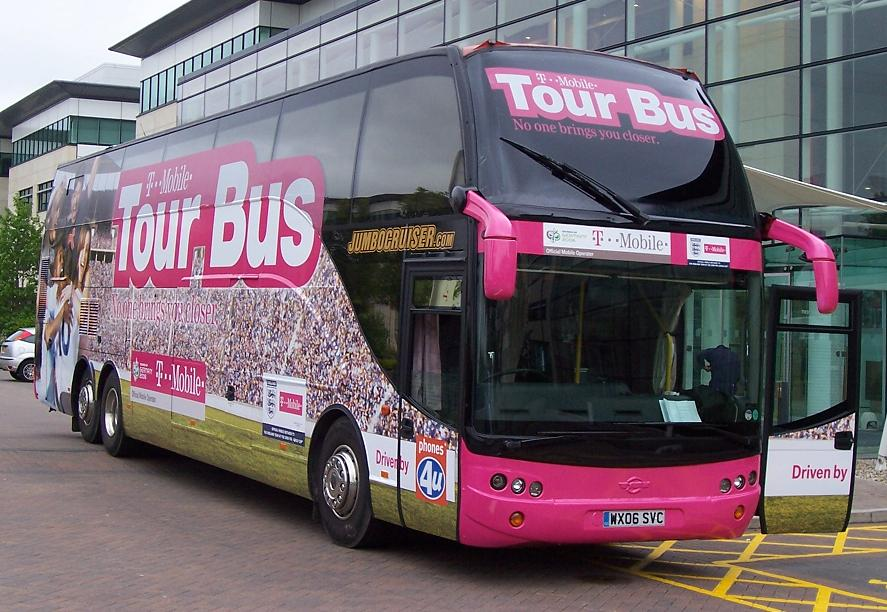
A Bravo coach with T-Mobile promotional advertising

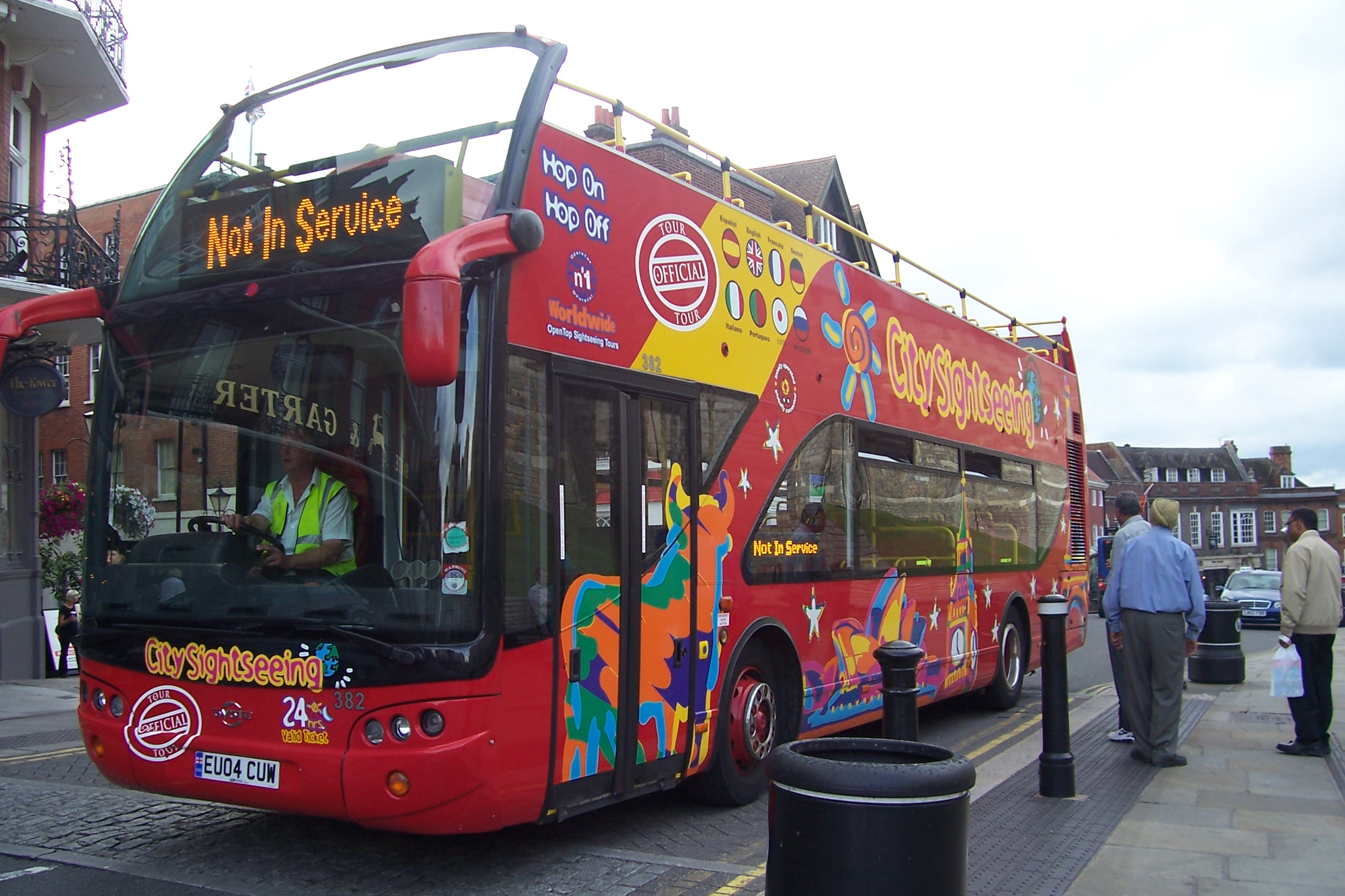
City Sightseeing Ayats Bravo at Windsor Castle

== See also ==
- Optare Visionaire
- Open top buses in the United Kingdom
- List of buses
