= The Original Tour =

British bus operating company

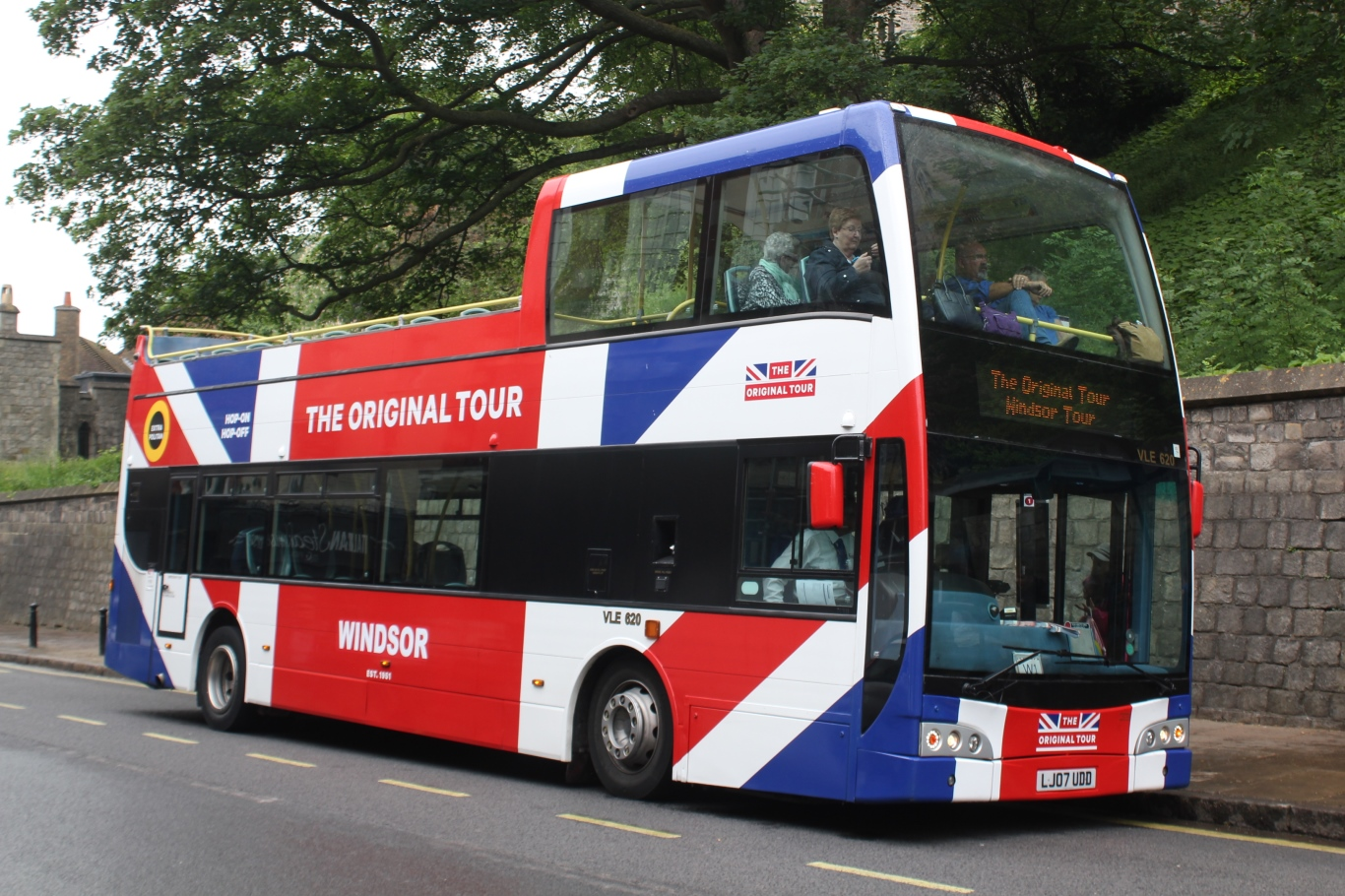
- The Original Tour's VLE620, an East Lancashire Optare Visionaire registered LJ07UDD, at the Windsor tour terminus outside the castle.
- Formerly: London Coaches, The Original Sightseeing Tour, Tootbus London
- Parent: First Bus London
- Founded: June 1951; 75 years ago
- Headquarters: Wandsworth Garage
- Service area: Central London
- Service type: Tourist bus operator
- Routes: 4
- Depots: 1
- Fleet: 90 (September 2014)
- Website: www.theoriginaltour.com

The Original Tour, formerly Tootbus London is a London bus tour operator using open-top double-decker buses. Based in Wandsworth, it is a subsidiary of First Bus London.

== History ==
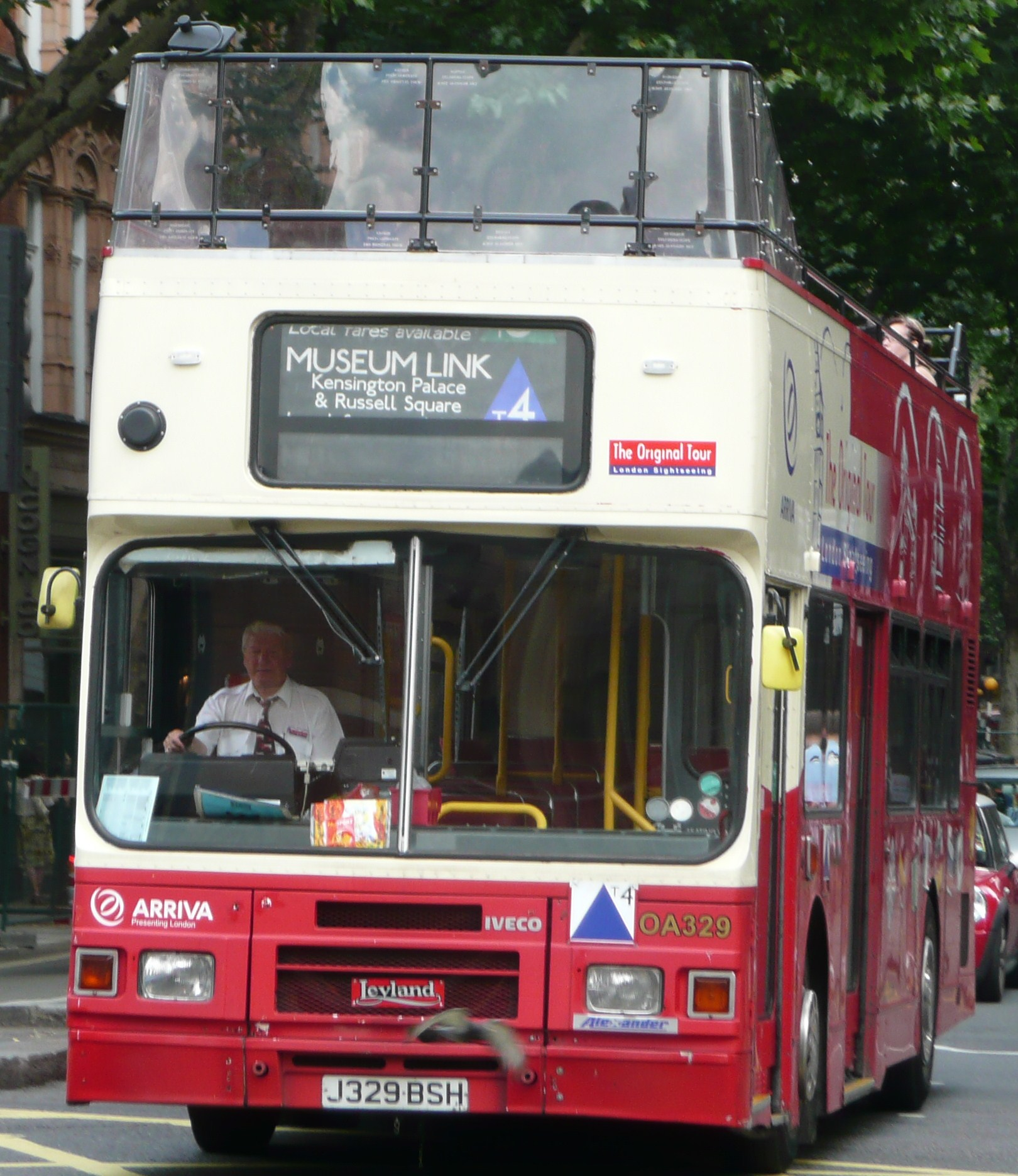
Alexander RH bodied Leyland Olympian in June 2008

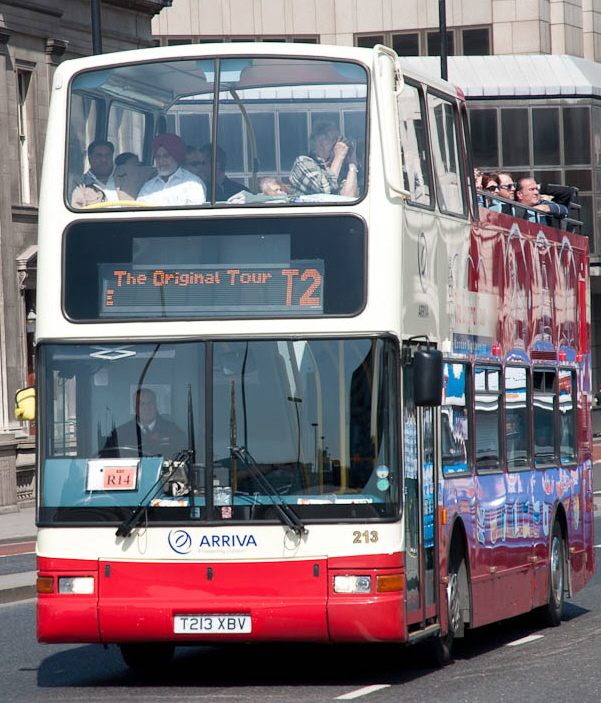
Plaxton President bodied DAF DB 250 in April 2011

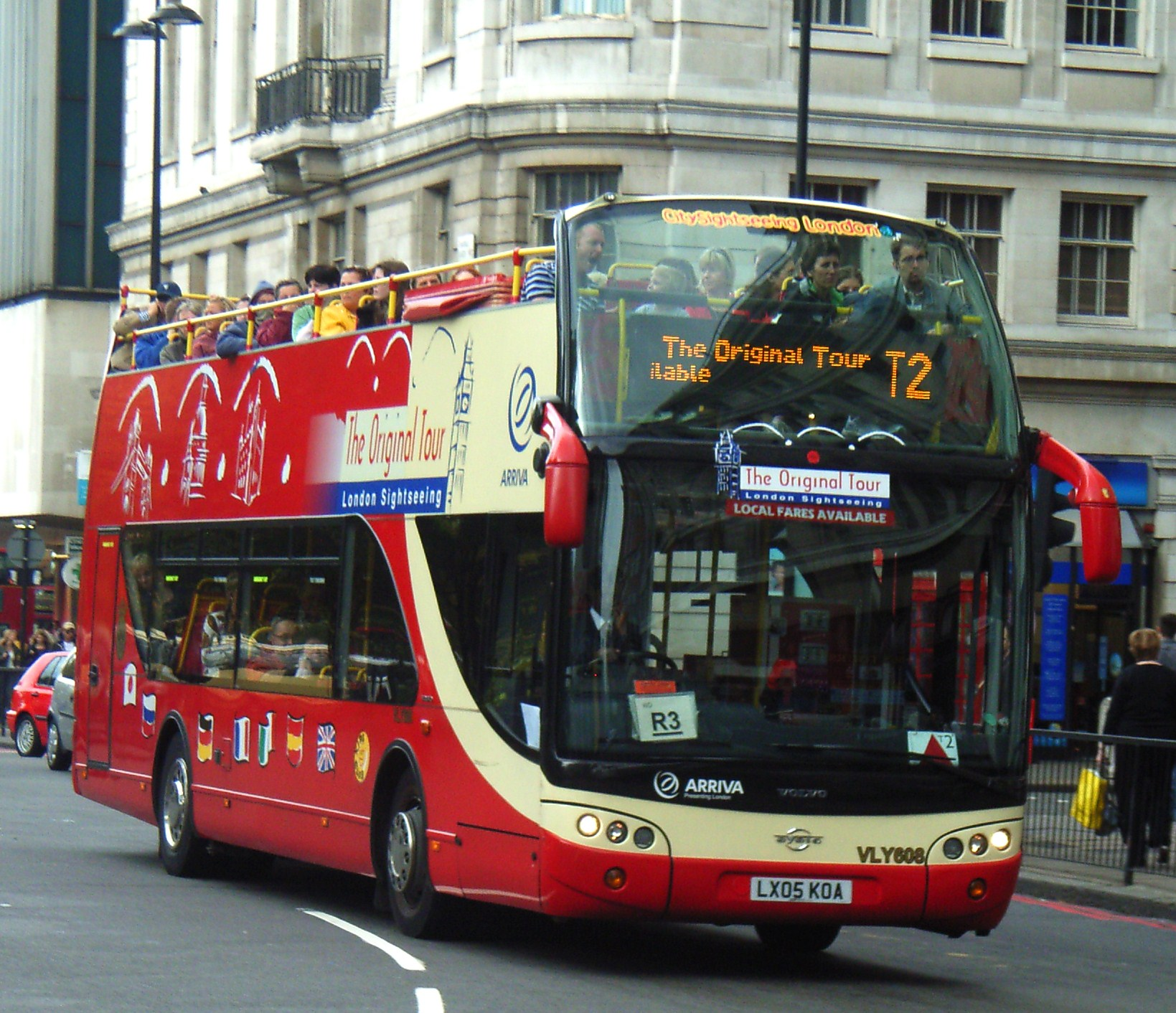
Ayats Bravo City bodied Volvo B7L in October 2007

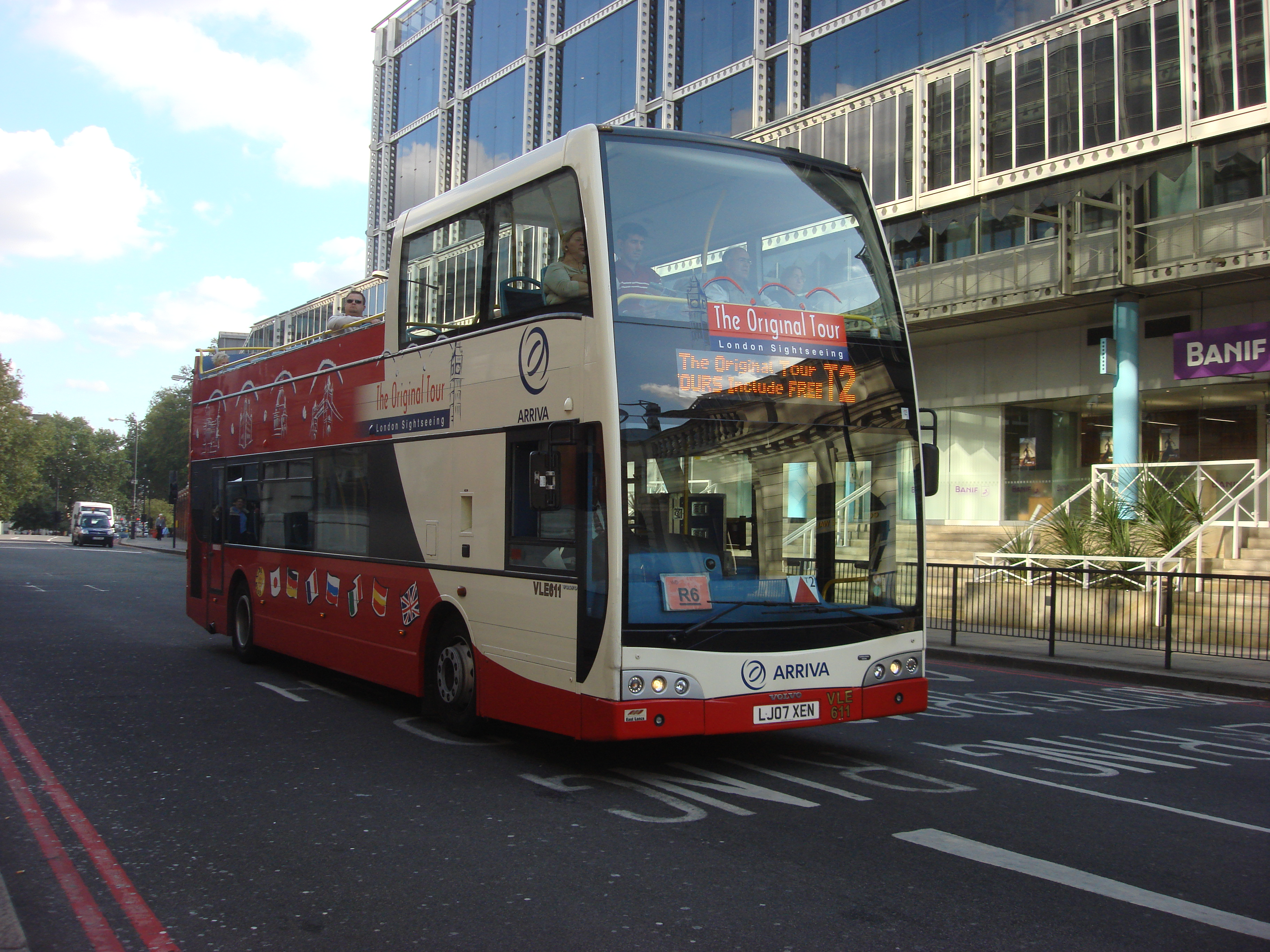
East Lancs Visionaire bodied Volvo B9TL in The Original Tour livery in October 2008

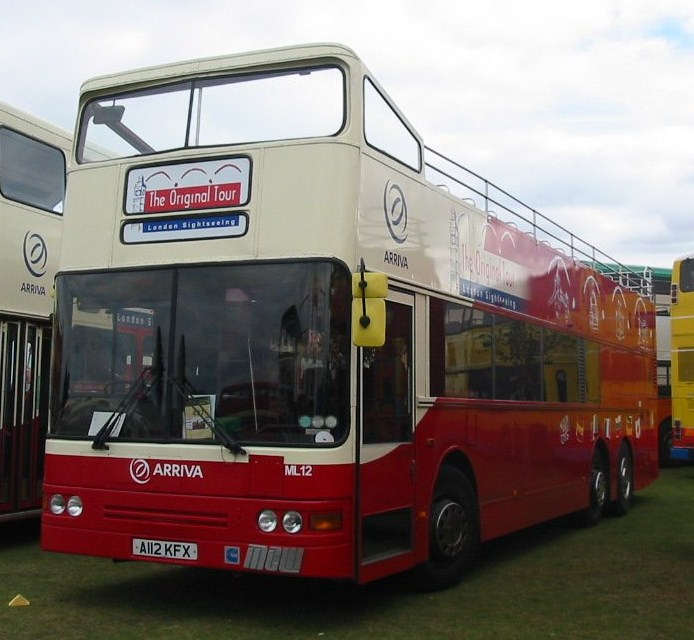
MCW Metroliner in August 2008

The Original Tour was founded in by June 1951 by the London Transport Executive at the time of The Festival of Britain. In 1986 it was privatised, being sold to London Coaches / Blue Triangle. In December 1997 it was sold to Arriva. In March 2001 the London Pride Sightseeing business was purchased.

In September 2014, the business was sold to RATP Dev. The business was rebranded to Tootbus London in July 2021, in line with other RATP Dev-owned sightseeing operations being rebranded under the Tootbus identity.

In December 2025, the company was acquired by FirstGroup and renamed as The Original Tour on the 75th anniversary of the company.

== Sightseeing tours ==
After purchase of a 24-hour ticket, 48-hour ticket or 72-hour ticket, ticket-holders may board any of the tour routes at over 40 different stops without another charge. Services operate daily, with a recorded audio guide in English and several other languages which can be listened to with headphones. A river cruise is also included in the ticket price.

The Original Tour operates three sightseeing routes, which are as follows:

Route name	Places served	Frequency	Other notes
Yellow Route	Tower Bridge, Tower of London, St Paul's Cathedral, London Eye, Big Ben, Houses of Parliament, Westminster Abbey, Buckingham Palace, Piccadilly Circus, Trafalgar Square, National Gallery, Downing Street, Borough Market, etc.	15–20 minutes	Route also includes a children's audio guide in English and French.
Royal Blue Route	Buckingham Palace, Lambeth Palace, London Eye, Big Ben, Houses of Parliament, Westminster Abbey, Downing Street, Trafalgar Square, Piccadilly Circus, Harrods, South Kensington, Kensington Palace, Hyde Park, Notting Hill, Marble Arch, etc.	20–30 minutes	
Green Route	Russell Square, King's Cross, St Pancras International station, Euston station, British Museum, Leicester Square, National Portrait Gallery, Trafalgar Square, Covent Garden, Somerset House and Aldwych	30 minutes	

Pre-recorded audio guides are provided on all routes in English, French, Spanish, German, Italian, Japanese, Brazilian, Chinese, Russian and Arabic as well as a children's audio guide in English and French on the Yellow Route.

=== Fares ===
The Original Tour tickets are valid for one to three days. Each ticket includes access to all tour routes and the Thames River Cruise.

== Transport for London ==
In May 2004 The Original Tour became a Transport for London (TfL) contracted bus operator when it commenced operating route 337, the first time a route service had operated out of Wandsworth garage since 1986. Buses operated with Arriva London branding, but under The Original Tour's operating licence. When next tendered, route 337 passed to London General in May 2011 and The Original Tour ceased being a TfL operator.

== Fleet ==
Historically the fleet consisted of former double deck route buses, that after being converted to open top configuration, were given a second life. However, in 2005 ten Ayats Bravo City bodied Volvo B7Ls were purchased new. As at September 2014, the fleet consisted of 90 buses. The fleet include Ayats Bravo City bodied Volvo B7Ls, Plaxton President bodied DAF DB250, Optare Visionaire or MCV DD103 bodied Volvo B9TL, Scania Omnicity buses, and the new purchased Unvi Urbis electric bus.

In November 2023, it was announced that the fleet of 15 Optare Visionaire bodied Volvo B9TL would be retrofitted with electric drivertrains to make them battery electric buses.

== See also ==
- Open top buses in the United Kingdom
- Sightseeing
