= East Lancs OmniDekka =

Low-floor double-decker bus body on Scania chassis

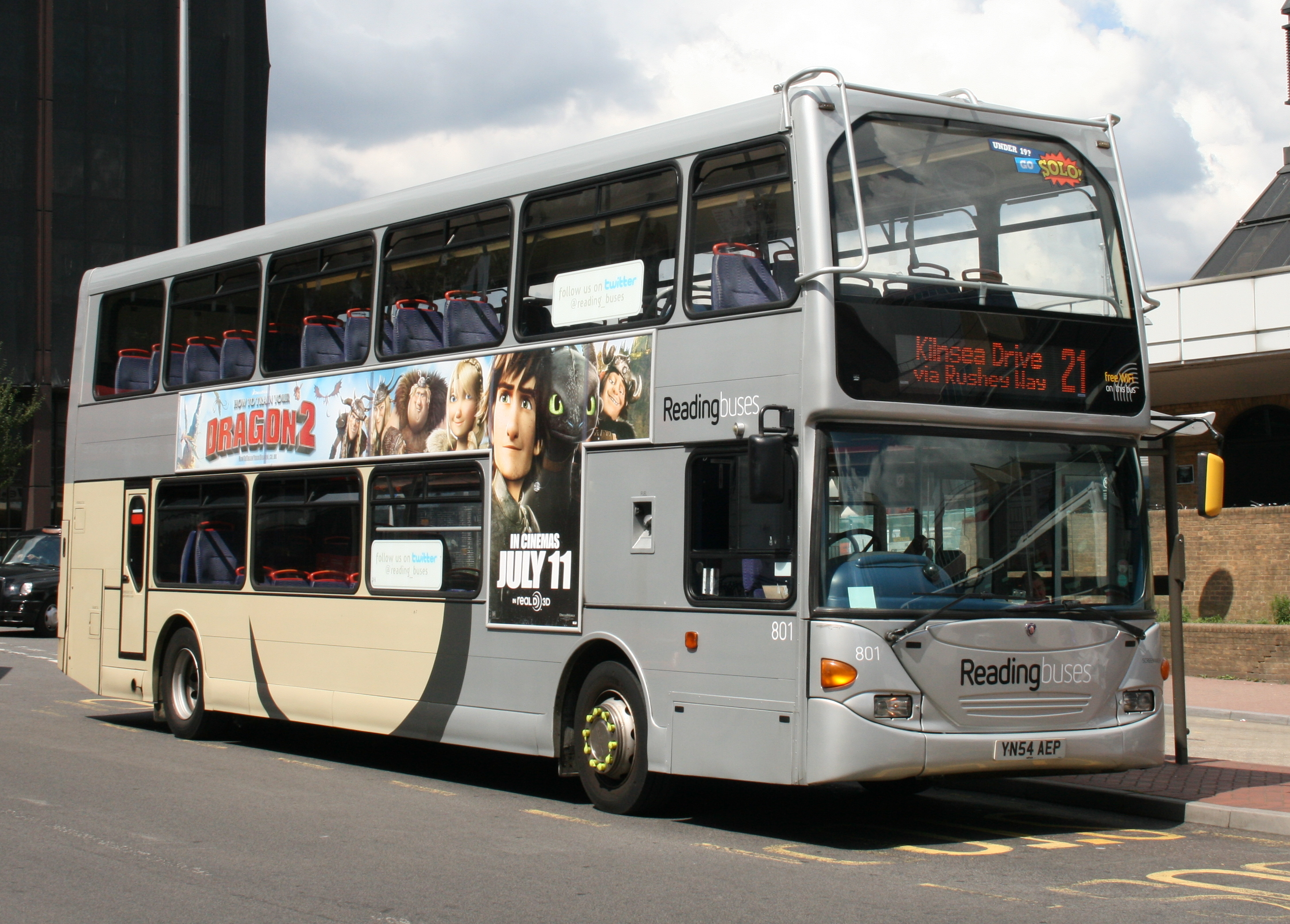
- Reading Buses East Lancs OmniDekka bodied Scania N94UD at Reading railway station in July 2014

Overview
- Manufacturer: East Lancashire Coachbuilders
- Production: 2003–2011
- Assembly: Blackburn, Lancashire, England

Body and chassis
- Doors: 1 or 2
- Floor type: Low floor
- Chassis: Scania N94UD; Scania N230UD; Scania N270UD
- Related: East Lancs OmniTown

Powertrain
- Engine: Euro III (N94UD); 9.0 L Scania DC9 I6 (230hp, 260hp); Euro IV (N-series); 8.9 L Scania DC9 I5 (230hp, 270hp); Euro V (N-series); 9.3 L Scania DC9 I5 (230hp)
- Capacity: 68–100 seated
- Transmission: ZF Ecomat

Dimensions
- Length: 10.6–12.0 m (34 ft 9 in – 39 ft 4 in)
- Width: 2.535 m (8 ft 3.8 in)
- Height: 4.1–4.2 m (13 ft 5 in – 13 ft 9 in)

Chronology
- Predecessor: East Lancs Cityzen
- Successor: Optare Olympus

The East Lancs OmniDekka (later sold as the Darwen OmniDekka and Optare OmniDekka) is a double-decker bus body built by East Lancashire Coachbuilders on a range of Scania bus chassis between 2003 and 2011. A modification of existing East Lancashire double-deck bodywork originally launched in 2003 on the Euro III Scania N94UD chassis, the OmniDekka was later built on Scania N230UD and N270UD, certified at Euro IV and Euro V emissions standard respectively.

== History ==
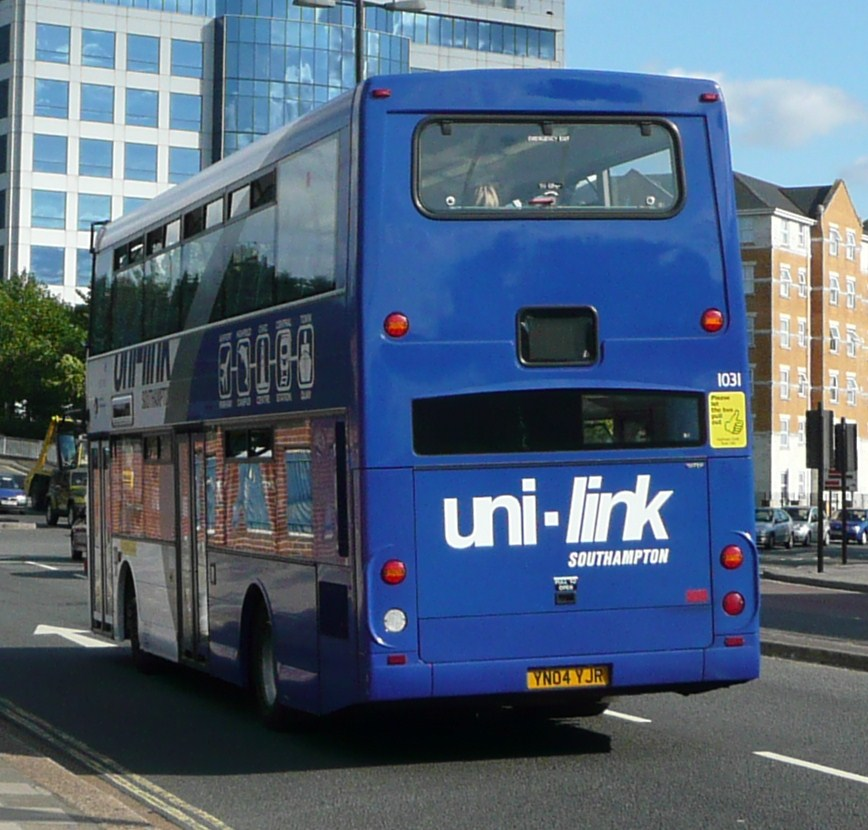
Rear of Unilink Scania N94UD OmniDekka Southampton in September 2008

Scania was late in bringing a low-floor double-deck chassis to the market, having previously only sold low-floor single-deck buses mainly bodied by Wrightbus during the 1990s. Scania had worked with East Lancashire Coachbuilders in 1995, however, to launch the East Lancs Cityzen step entrance double decker on the Scania N113DRB chassis.

In 2002, East Lancashire Coachbuilders bodied a batch of short-wheelbase Scania N94UBs with East Lancs Myllennium midibus bodywork for London Easylink. The East Lancs OmniTown midibus was a further development of the type delivered to London Easylink, modifying the Myllennium's front end panelling to resemble that of an OmniCity.

These developments eventually led to East Lancashire Coachbuilders launching the OmniDekka double-decker body on the N94UD chassis, featuring an inclined transverse engine, in March 2003. The OmniDekka bodywork was a modification of previous East Lancashire double decker designs in its 'Myllennium' range, with the standard front end cowl and windscreen replaced with that of Scania's integral OmniCity. Upon launch, N94UD chassis kits for the OmniDekka were assembled at the former Leyland Bus product development site in Leyland, Lancashire, after plans to assemble the kits at East Lancashire's Blackburn factory were abandoned.

In July 2006, the OmniDekka was replaced in East Lancs' product range by the East Lancs Olympus on the then-new Euro IV certified Scania N270UD chassis. In September 2004, however, Scania had already launched a Euro IV double-decker version of their integral OmniCity for the UK and Ireland operating markets, which entered production from January 2005 and ultimately replaced the OmniDekka as the Scania vehicle of choice, especially amongst TfL contractor bus operators.

== Operators ==
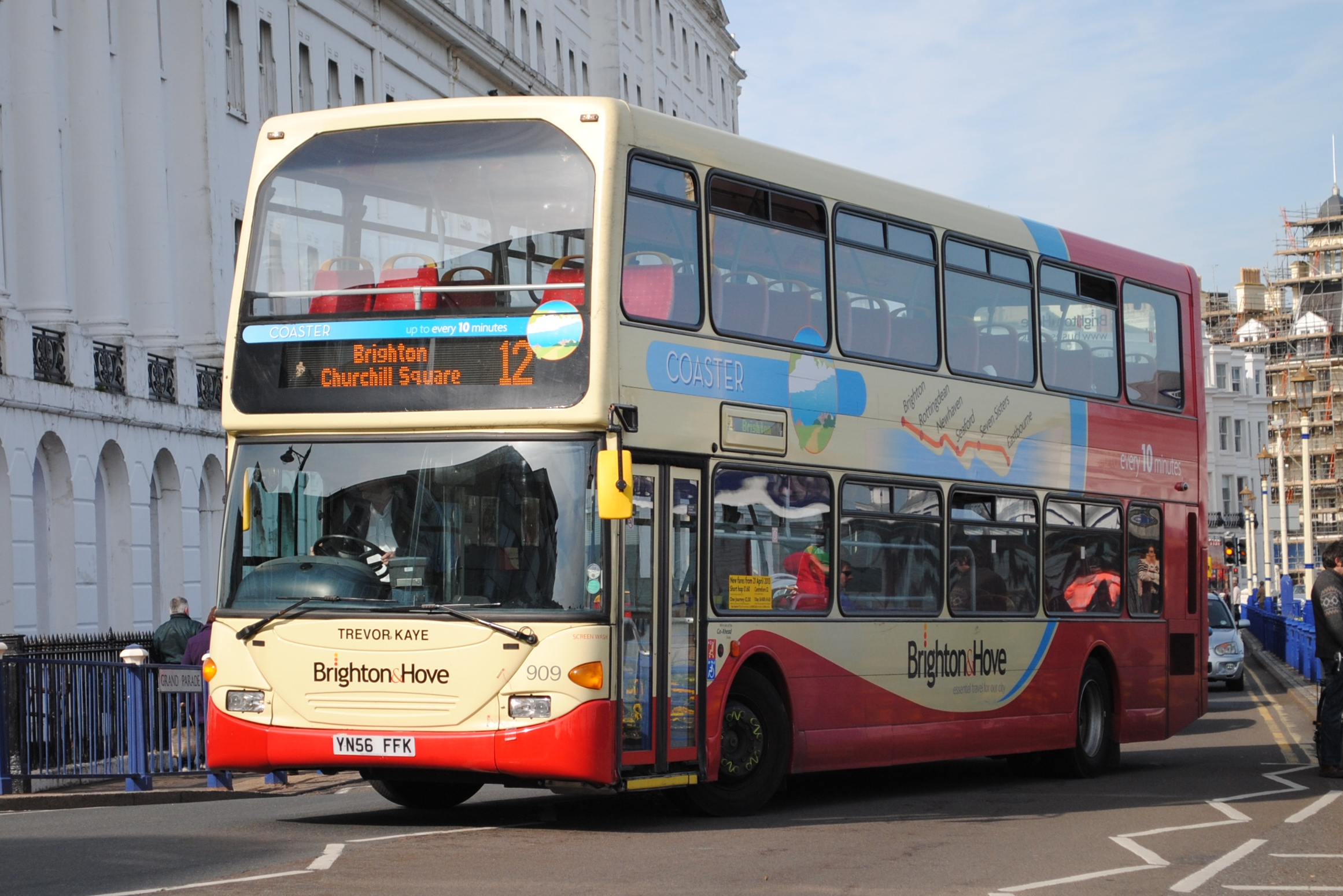
Brighton & Hove East Lancs OmniDekka bodied Scania N94UD in Eastbourne in April 2013

The first production East Lancs OmniDekka was delivered to independent Beestons of Hadleigh in 2003. Another three were delivered to Beestons between 2005 and 2006.

The largest operator overall of East Lancs OmniDekkas was municipal bus company Nottingham City Transport, who took delivery of a total 174 on Scania N94UD, N230UD and N270UD chassis throughout the body's entire production run between 2003 and 2011. Of these, Nottingham City Transport took delivery of the last 32 OmniDekkas produced in June 2011, long after other operators had stopped purchasing the type. The last of Nottingham's OmniDekkas were withdrawn during 2026.

The second-largest operator of OmniDekkas was Metrobus of Crawley, who took delivery of a total of 110 OmniDekkas on N94UD chassis for use on both its contracted Transport for London (TfL) and commercial bus services between 2003 and 2006, with an additional six on N270UD chassis delivered in 2007. Brighton & Hove, meanwhile, took delivery of 103 OmniDekkas on both N94UD and N230UD chassis, some of which were built as convertible open-toppers, between 2003 and 2007.

Transport for London contractor London United and its sister company London Sovereign took delivery of 64 OmniDekka bodied N94UDs between 2004 and 2005, while municipal company Reading Buses took delivery of 34 OmniDekkas in two batches between 2004 and 2006 as part of a major rebranding of its bus network.

Smaller operators of OmniDekkas on Scania N94UD chassis included the FirstGroup, who had a total of 30 delivered to its Scotland East, Hampshire and Plymouth operations between 2004 and late 2005, Yorkshire Traction, who took delivery of six in late 2004, Stagecoach Midlands, who took delivery of five for the Corby Star bus network, and Minerva Accord of Southampton, who took delivery of four after changing its order from TransBus Presidents in July 2004 following the collapse of TransBus International.

A single N94UD OmniDekka was built to Lothian Buses specification and delivered to the operator on long-term loan in June 2004, intended for use for comparative trials against Lothian's existing low-floor double-deckers on services 37 and 37A in Edinburgh. However, no orders resulted from this trial, and the OmniDekka was subsequently disposed of a year later. An OmniDekka shell on Scania N94UD chassis also was supplied to South Somerset District Council for conversion into a playbus in late 2004.

== See also ==
- East Lancs OmniTown, the single-deck predecessor to the OmniDekka
