= Optare Visionaire =

Open top double-decker bus body built by Optare

East Lancs Visionaire/Optare Visionaire
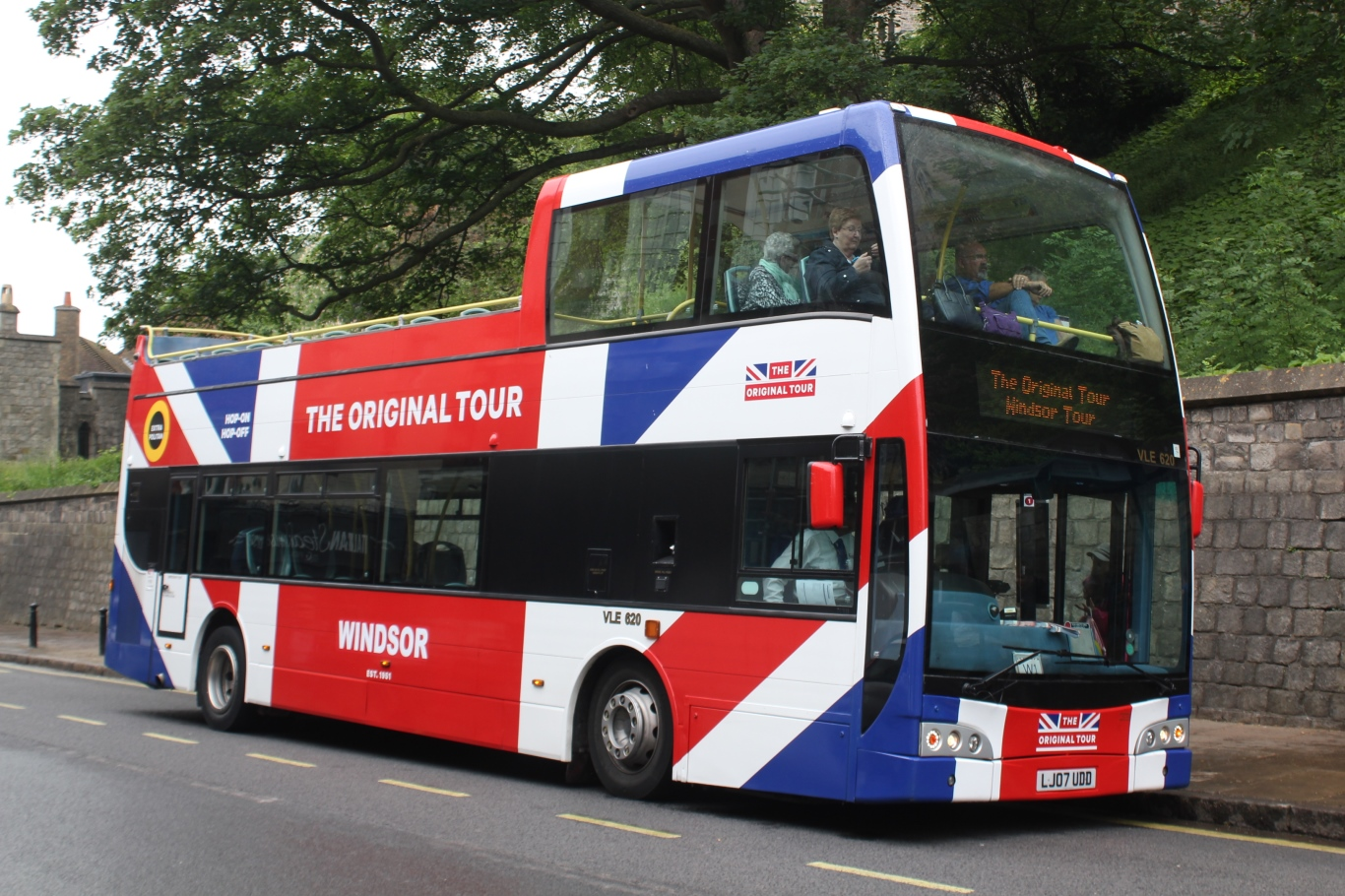
- The Original Tour East Lancs Visionaire bodied Volvo B9TL in London

Overview
- Manufacturer: East Lancashire Coachbuilders; Optare
- Production: 2006–2009

Body and chassis
- Doors: 1 door
- Floor type: Low floor
- Chassis: Scania N230UD; Scania N270UD; Volvo B9TL (2 or 3 axle)
- Related: Optare Olympus

Powertrain
- Capacity: 68 to 100 seated

Dimensions
- Length: 10.2m to 11.9m
- Width: 2.535m
- Height: 4.2m to 4.3m

The Optare Visionaire (introduced in 2006 as the East Lancs Visionaire, and branded the Darwen Visionaire between 2007 and 2008) is an open top double-decker bus body built by Optare. It is in terms of engineering an open top Olympus (itself a double-decker variant of the Esteem) in all but name. The Optare Visionaire was also built for tri-axle double-decker bus chassis.

== History ==
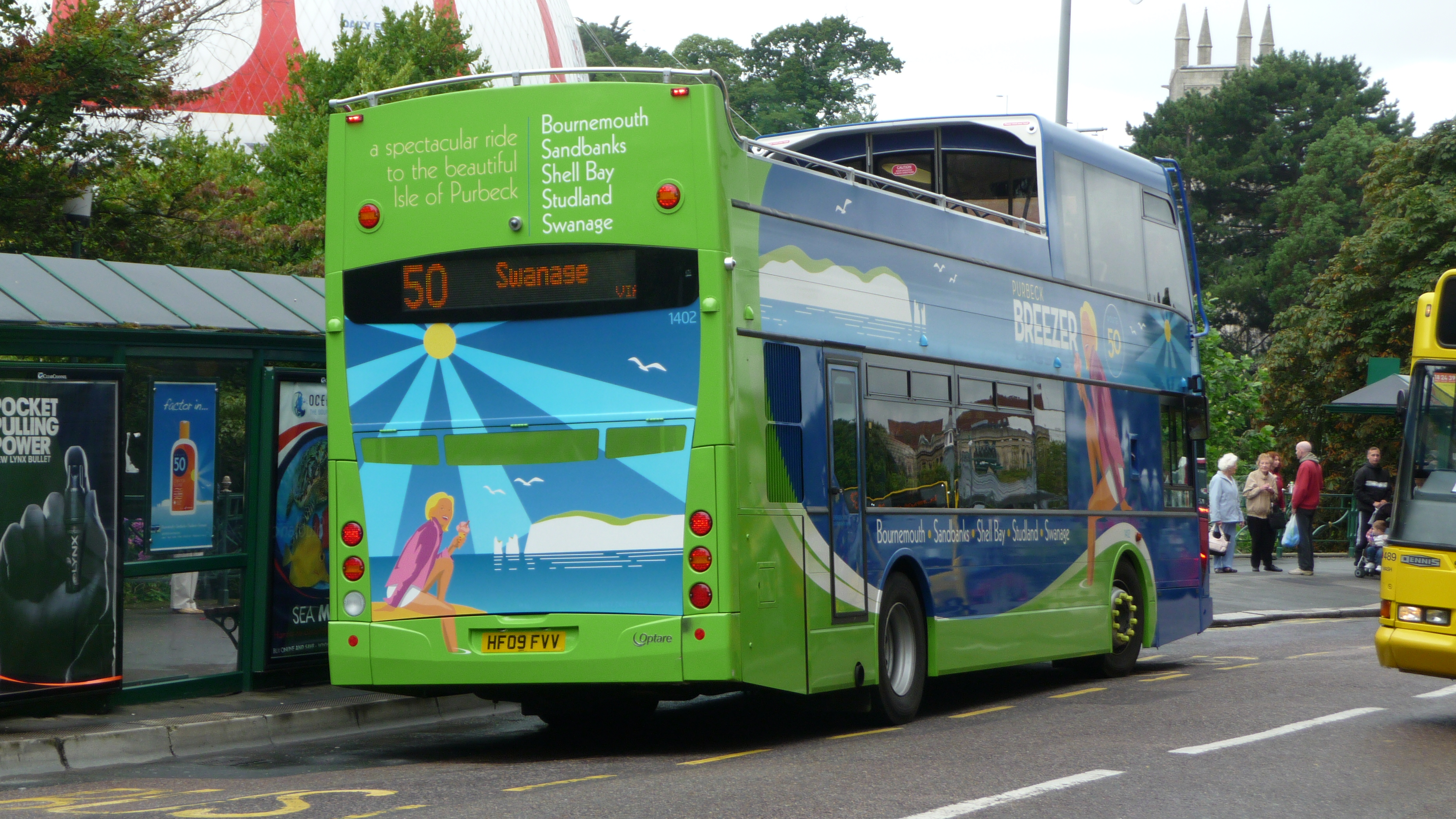
Wilts & Dorset Optare Visionaire bodied Scania N230UD in Bournemouth, Dorset in July 2009

The first orders were made in November 2006 by Arriva's The Original Tour for a £1.6 million order for ten, built on Volvo's B9TL Euro IV chassis. These all entered service and were the only order for the East Lancs Visionaire.

=== Acquisition by Darwen ===
After East Lancs went into administration in 2007, the business was bought by the Darwen Group, and the East Lancs Visionaire was renamed the Darwen Visionaire. During this time, an order was received for a number of Visionaires.

An open top single-decker bus, the Panaire, was also offered at the time and none were built.

=== Reverse takeover by Optare ===
Since the order for the Darwen Visionaires, Darwen Group performed a reverse takeover with Optare. Ten Optare Visionaires entered service on Big Bus Tours London tour. These were ordered in the Darwen period, but have been built under the new Optare name. Therefore, no Visionaires were built under the Darwen name, despite orders being taken. Wilts & Dorset received 9 Visionaires for use on the Purbeck Breezer services linking Swanage with Wareham, Poole and Bournemouth. Today this operates under morebus.

== See also ==
- List of buses
