= Scania N series =

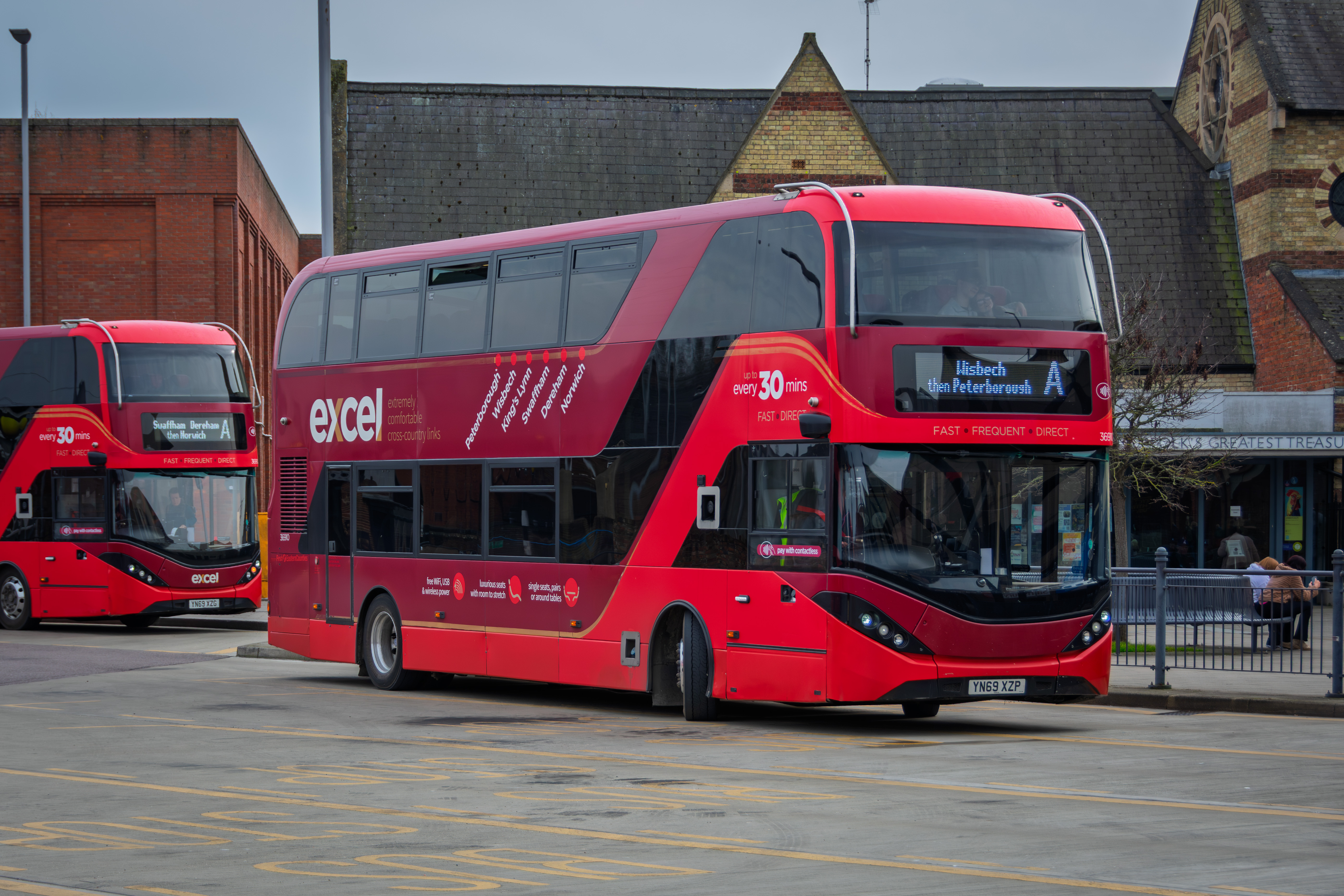
- First Eastern Counties Alexander Dennis Enviro400 City bodied N250UD, March 2026

Overview
- Manufacturer: Scania
- Also called: N UA, N UB, N UD
- Production: 2006–present
- Model years: 2007–present
- Assembly: Södertälje, Sweden
- Designer: Scania

Body and chassis
- Class: Bus chassis
- Body style: Full-size rigid single-decker bus/Articulated bus/Double-decker bus
- Doors: 1, 2, 3 or 4
- Floor type: Low floor
- Related: Scania K series

Powertrain
- Engine: 8.9 L Turbocharged I5; 9.0 L Turbocharged I5

Dimensions
- Length: 10.1m, 10.6m, 12.0m, 18.0m
- Width: 2.5m
- Height: 3.0m or 4.25m

Chronology
- Predecessor: Scania N94

The Scania N series is a line of low-floor bus chassis with straight-up, transversely mounted Euro IV or newer engine at the rear, built by Scania since 2006, replacing the Scania N94.

It is available as the N UB (N230UB, N270UB, N280UB) two-axle single-decker bus, the N UA (N310UA) tri-axle articulated bus, and the N UD (N230UD, N250UD, N260UD, N270UD, N280UD, N320UD) two-axle double-decker bus. The double-decker variant is mainly built for use in the United Kingdom, and was initially available both as an integral product known as the Scania OmniCity, and as a separate chassis with Alexander Dennis Enviro400 bodywork.

The N230UD is the best selling variant of the N-series chassis, with Stagecoach in the United Kingdom being the largest customer. The N230UD was succeeded as the main model of the N-series family by the updated N250UD in 2015, which was launched with the updated Alexander Dennis Enviro400 MMC bodywork. This also marked the official end of the double deck variant of the Scania OmniCity.

A gas-powered double-decker variant of the N-series chassis, known as the N280UD, was launched with Enviro400 MMC bodywork in 2016. Reading Buses was the first customer of the United Kingdom's first ever gas-powered double-decker bus. The largest UK fleet of N280UD buses is in service with Nottingham City Transport, with the total fleet there reaching 120 by the end of 2019. Their examples are Enviro400 City bodied.

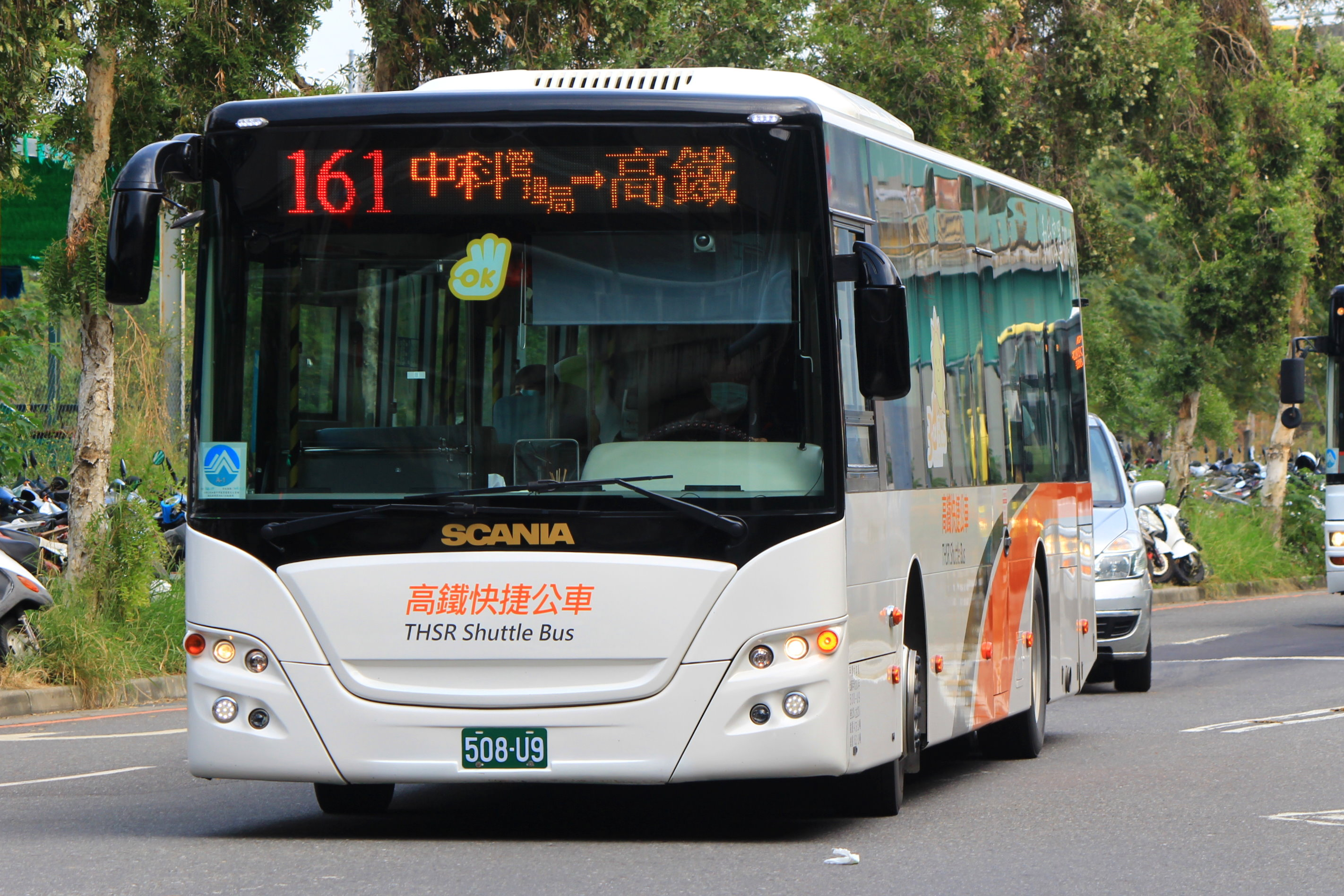
A Gemilang Coachworks bodied Scania N230UB bus operated by Ho-Hsin Bus in Taichung, Taiwan

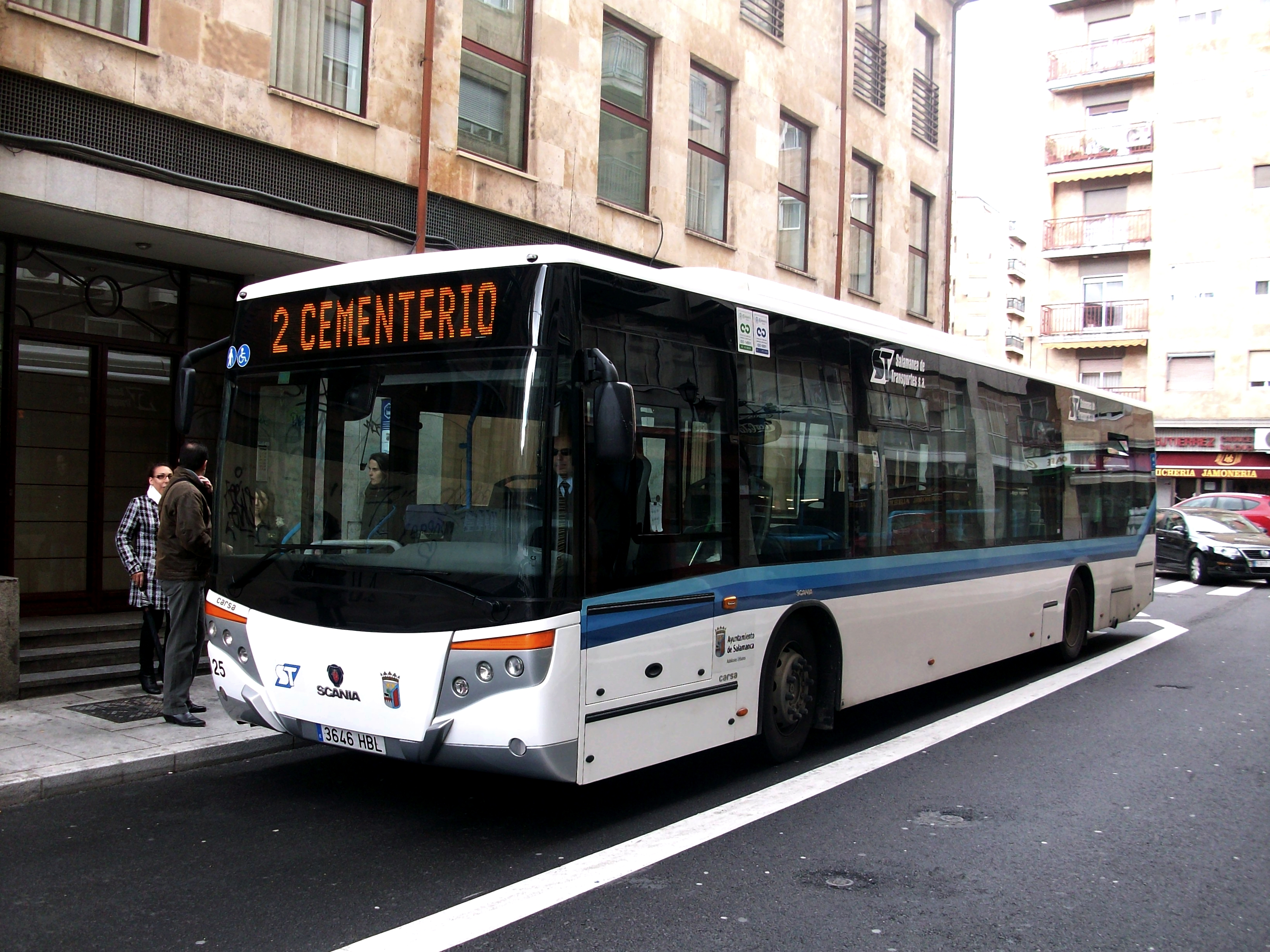
A Scania N270UB Casa Versus in Salamanca, Spain.

== See also ==
- List of buses
