= MCV Bus and Coach =

Bus manufacturer based in Egypt

- Founded: 2002
- Headquarters: Obour (city) (headquarters) and El Salheya El Gedida (factory), Egypt
- Products: Bus bodies
- Parent: Manufacturing Commercial Vehicles
- Website: www.mcv-eg.com

MCV Bus and Coach is an Egyptian manufacturer of bus bodies founded in 2002 when Manufacturing Commercial Vehicles bought some of the design rights of defunct English bus builder Marshall Bus.

The MCV factory is located in El Salheya El Gedida ("New Salheya"), approximately 100 km north of Cairo.

== History ==
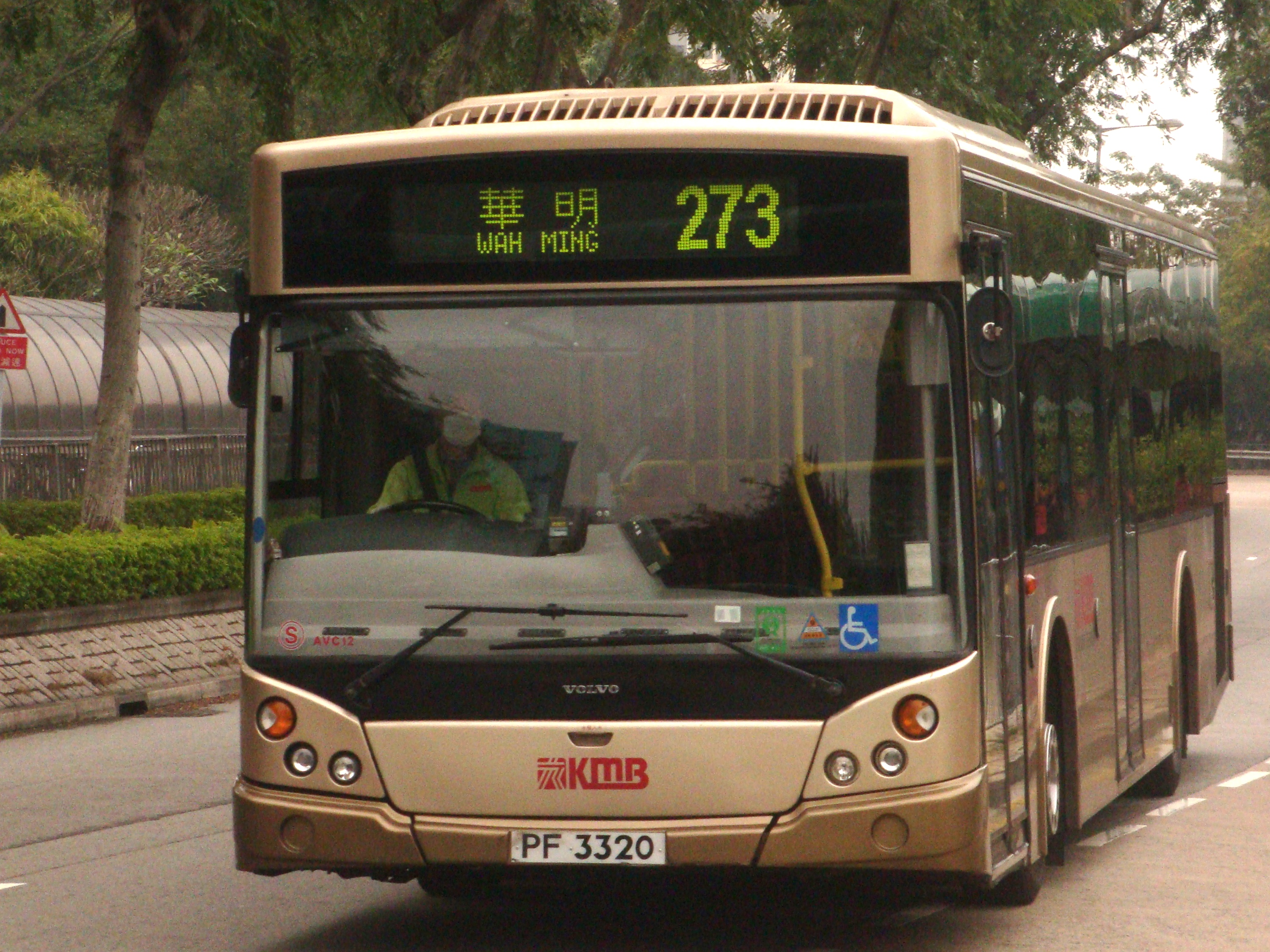
Kowloon Motor Bus MCV Evolution bodied Volvo B7RLE in January 2012

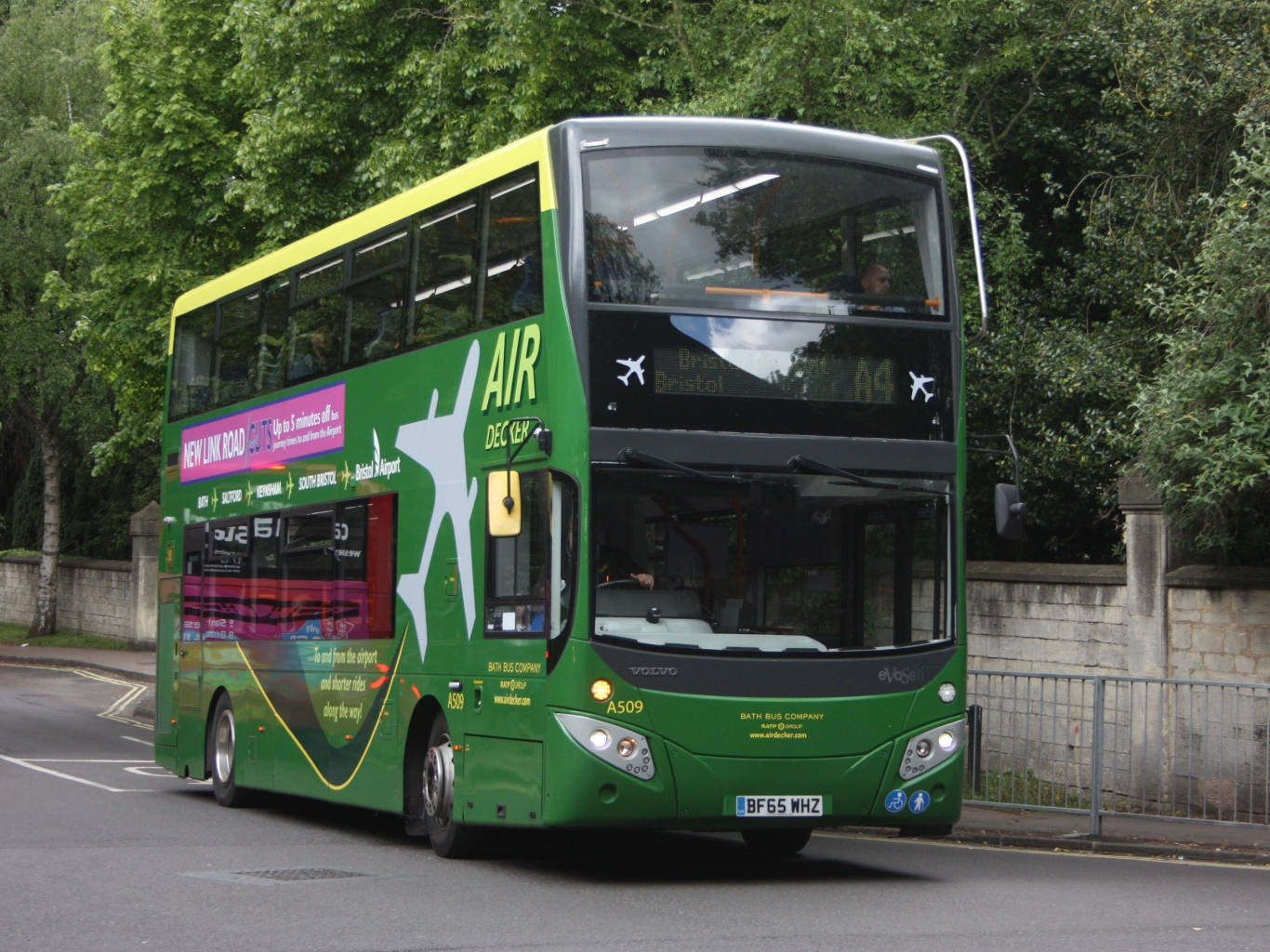
Bath Bus Company MCV EvoSeti bodied Volvo B5TL in December 2017

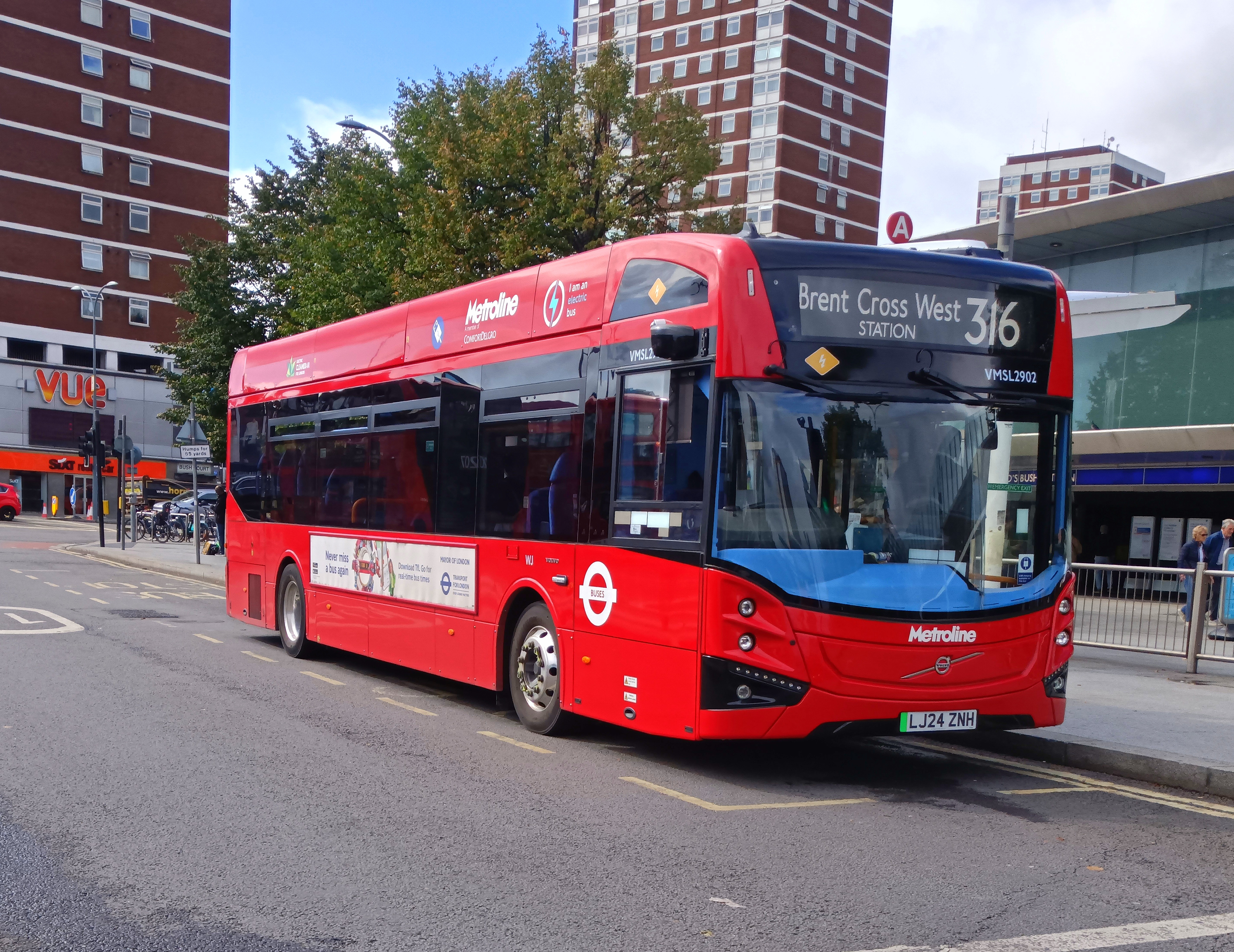
Metroline MCV bodied Volvo BZL at Shepherd's Bush in September 2025

MCV's first deliveries were five Capital bodies on Dennis Darts for English operator Warrington Borough Transport in early 2003. However TransBus subsequently decided not to make the Dart chassis available to other bodybuilders resulting in the superseding MCV Stirling appearing on the MAN 14.220 chassis.

This was in turn succeeded by the MCV Evolution in 2005 that has been built on various chassis from Alexander Dennis, MAN, Mercedes-Benz, VDL and Volvo.

MCV has also built double deck bodies with the DD102, DD103 and EvoSeti. The latter has been purchased in sizeable numbers by London operators Go-Ahead London, Golden Tours and Tower Transit.

== Current models ==
- MCV EvoTor (2018–present)
- MCV Evora (2018–present)
- MCV EvoSeti (2015–present)

=== In collaboration with Volvo ===
- Volvo 7900e (Body only, 2023–present)
- Volvo BZL single-deck (Body only, 2021–present)
- MCV DD113 (Body only, 2023–present)
- MCV DD123 (Body only, 2023–present)

== Former models ==
- MCV Capital (2003)
- MCV DD102 (2014)
- MCV DD103 (2011–2014)
- MCV Ego (2006–2007)
- MCV Evolution (2003–2014)
- MCV Stirling (2003–2005)
- MCV Evolution 2 (2011–2018)
