= Manufacturing Commercial Vehicles =

Egyptian manufacturer of buses and trucks

Manufacturing Commercial Vehicles صناعة وسائل النقل
- Type: Corporation
- Industry: Automotive
- Founded: 1994
- Founder: Karim Ghabbour and Edzard Hans Wilhelm Reuter
- Headquarters: Obour City, near Cairo, Egypt
- Area served: Africa, Brazil, Caribbean, Central America, China, Europe, Middle East
- Key people: Karim Ghabbour
- Products: Buses; Trucks
- Operating income: E£493.11 million
- Number of employees: 5,000
- Website: www.mcv-eg.com

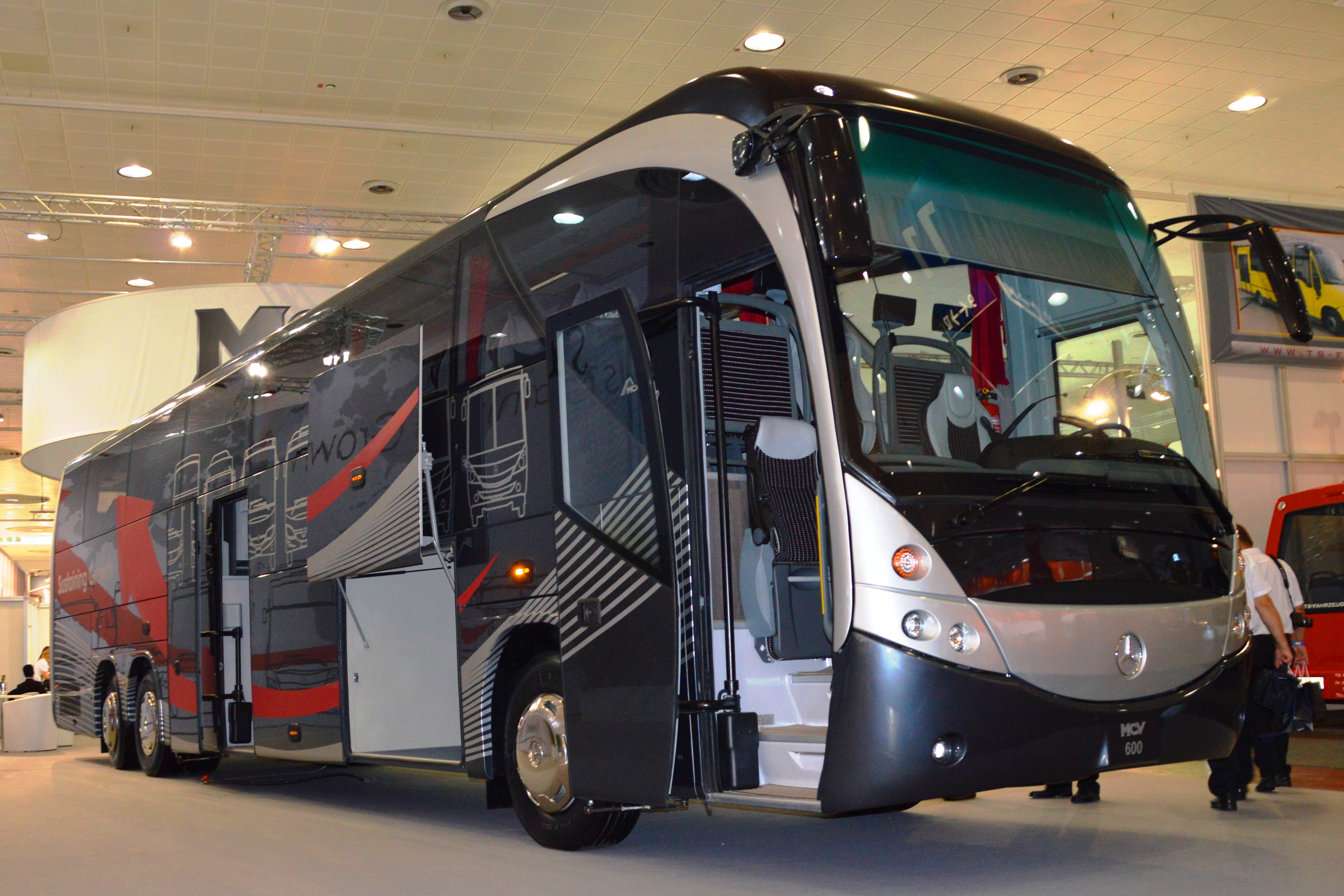
Modern MCV 600 3-axles comfort coach at the IAA 2014.

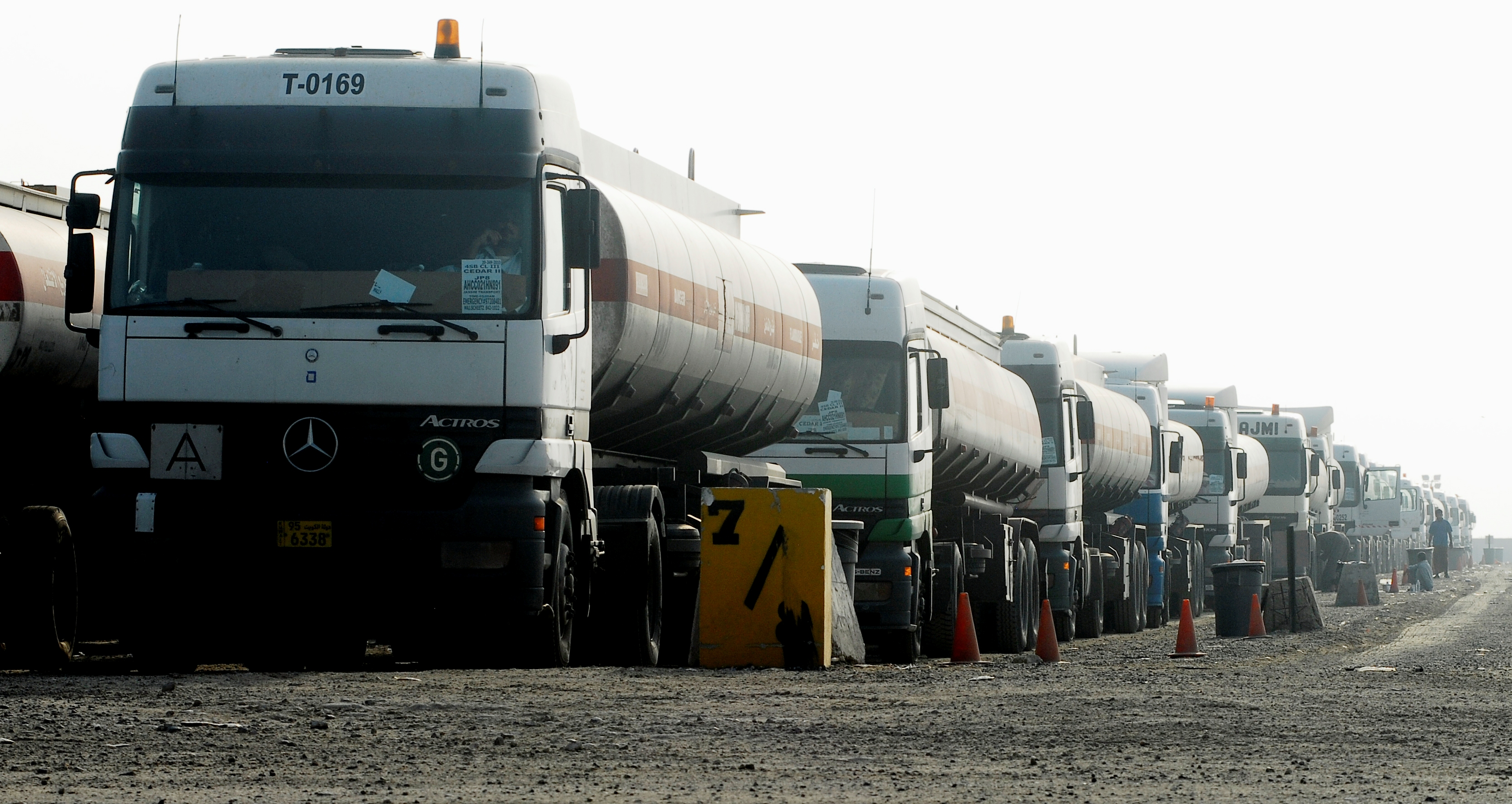
A convoy of civilian Mercedes-Benz Actros trucks in Iraq waiting for inspection. The vehicles are built in the Cairo plant of MCV.

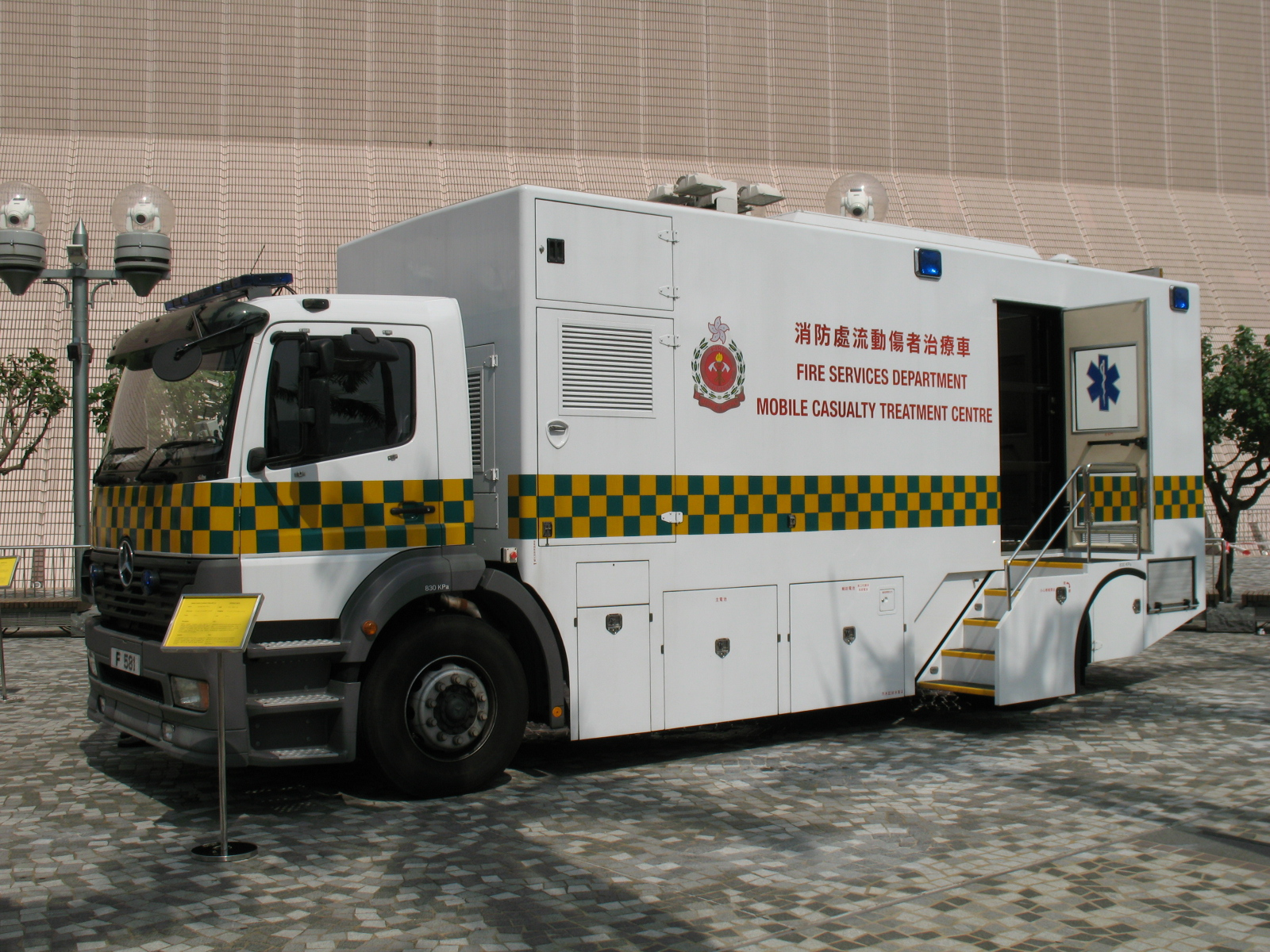
A MCV manufactured Mercedes-Benz Axor from the Hong Kong Fire Services Department.

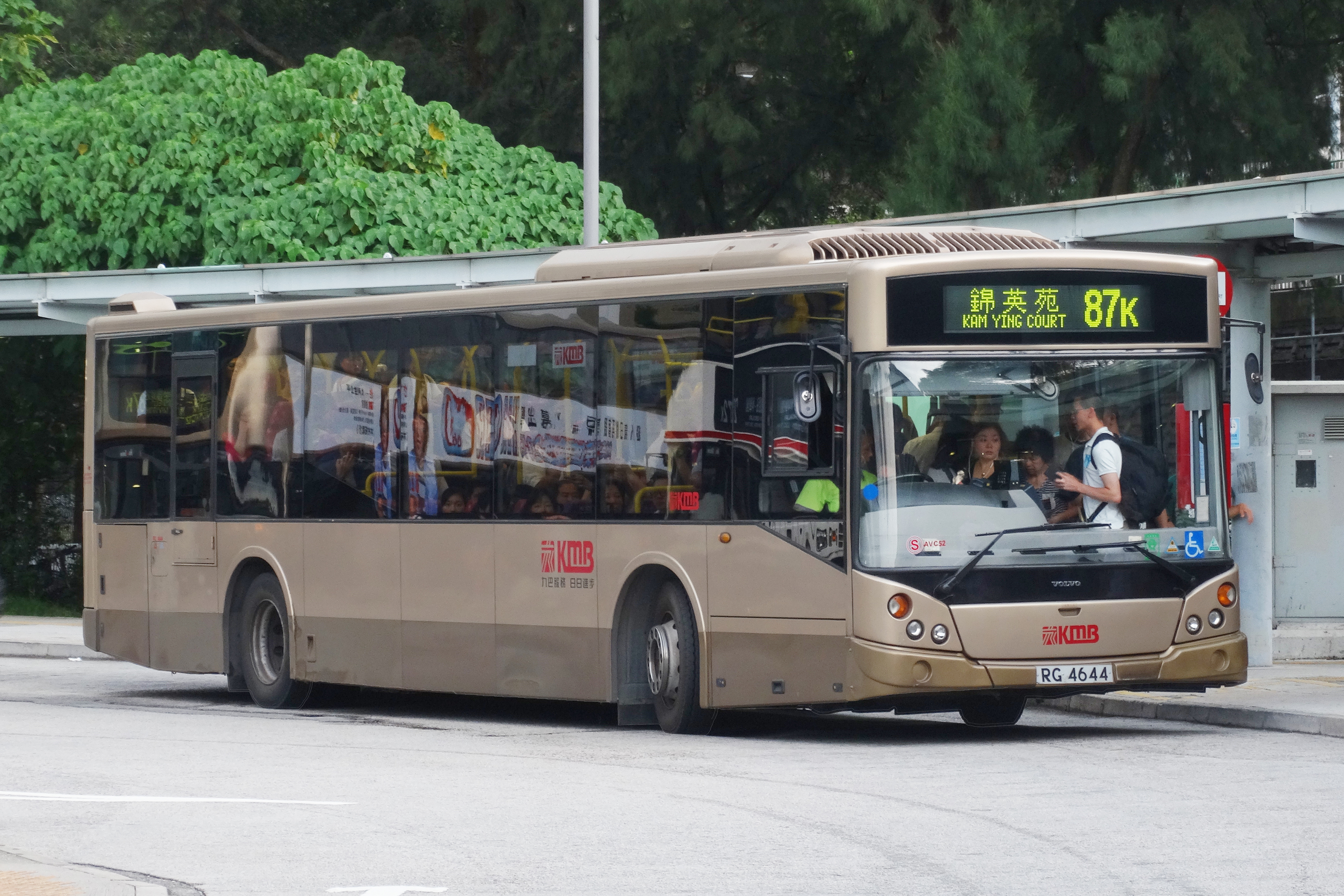
Kowloon Motor Bus MCV Evolution bodied Volvo B7RLE in Hong Kong in August 2015

Manufacturing Commercial Vehicles (MCV) is an Egyptian manufacturer for buses and trucks. The manufacturing plant is located in El Salheya El Gedida ("New Salheya"), with the head office in Obour City, near Cairo. The manufacturer owns the trademark rights of the brands ECHOLINE, eVolution and MCV. Some models are assembled under the dual brand name Mercedes-Benz MCV.

== History ==
The company was founded in 1994 after a purchase of two factory facilities from the Ghabbour Group by Daimler AG. The production capacity in Egypt is 6,000 buses and 1,200 trucks a year.

== Worldwide locations ==
- Cuba: Since 1995 MCV Cuba is the official importer for vehicles of the Daimler AG. It is the only authorized dealer of Mercedes-Benz vehicles.
- Algeria: Since 2000 as importer
- United Arab Emirates (2002): Abu Dhabi
- United Kingdom (2002 after the purchase of Marshall Bus): Ely (MCV Bus & Coach)
- South Africa (Parow). 2007: Acquiring of the bus factory De Haan's Bus & Coach; annual production capacity: 150 buses.
- Uzbekistan: In 2010 a joint venture with UzAvtosanoat was configured. The project is postponed.

== Model overview ==
=== Commercial vehicles (passenger car classified) ===
- Mercedes-Benz Sprinter (Generation T1N Mk. II)

=== Buses ===
- ECHOLINE E10 / 20 (also known as Ecoline-DAFC and FOTON in the People's Republic of China)
- ECHOLINE E30 (also known as Ecoline-DAFC and FOTON in the People's Republic of China)
- ECHOLINE E40 (also known as Ecoline-DAFC and FOTON in the People's Republic of China)
- eVolution-MAN C100 / C110 / C120 (from 2004)
- eVolution-DENNIS C101 / C111 / C121 (from 2004)
- eVolution C123RLE (for Volvo B7RLE)
- eVolution C124RLE (for Mercedes-Benz OC500LE)
- MCV Evora
- MCV EvoSeti
- MCV Alfa
- MCV Ego (since 2006; Great Britain)
- MCV Stirling
- MCV DD103 (for Volvo B9TL)
- Mercedes-Benz MCV 200 Safari (since 2010, based on the Mercedes-Benz Atego)
- Mercedes-Benz MCV 240E (since 2008)
- Mercedes-Benz MCV 260C / R / S (since 2000)
- Mercedes-Benz MCV 260T
- Mercedes-Benz MCV 400 E / H / R / T
- Mercedes-Benz MCV 500 (since 1996)
- Mercedes-Benz MCV 600 (since 1996)
- Mercedes-Benz MCV C120 / C120 LE
- Mercedes-Benz Tourismo
- Mercedes-Benz Travego (available in three different fronts)

=== Coaches ===
- MCV EvoTor

=== Trucks ===
- Mercedes-Benz Actros (in licence of the Chinese Dongfeng Pika; vehicle parts are manufactured and delivered by Isuzu and Dongfeng Motor)
- Mercedes-Benz Atego 917 / 1325 AF / 1528 AF
- Mercedes-Benz Axor 1823 / 1923 / 1928
- Mercedes-Benz LN
- Mercedes-Benz MB 1728
