= Reliance (bus company) =

Bus operator in North Yorkshire, England

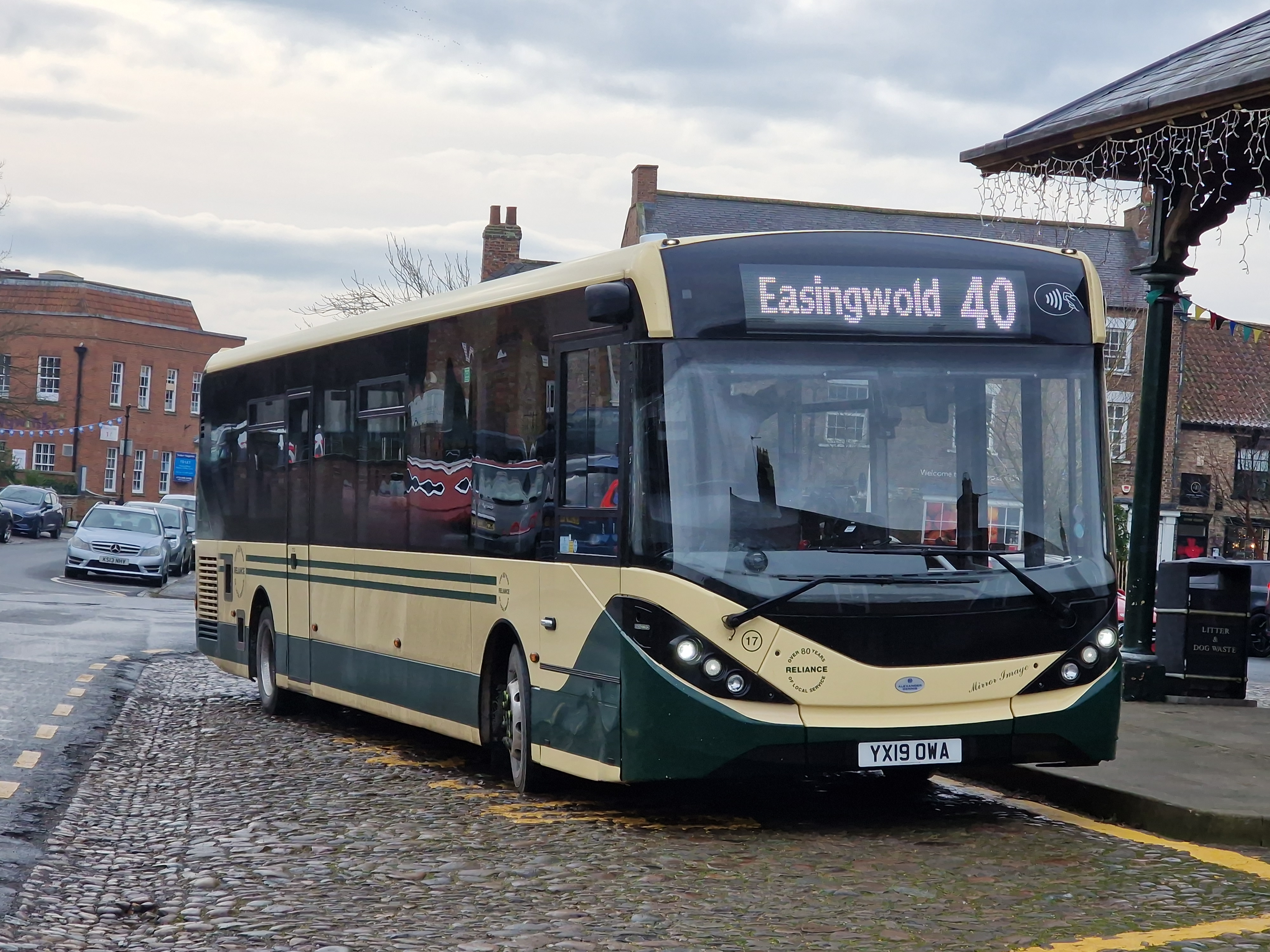
- Alexander Dennis Enviro200 MMC operating service 40 in Easingwold in January 2025
- Founded: 1930; 96 years ago
- Headquarters: Sutton-on-the-Forest, North Yorkshire, England
- Locale: York
- Service area: North Yorkshire
- Service type: Rail replacement and school bus services
- Directors: Gary and Hollie Newby
- Website: reliancebuses.co.uk

Reliance is a bus company that formerly operated regional bus services in North Yorkshire, England.

== History ==
The company was founded by Edward Sheriff in 1930. Initially, the company took over the York to Helmsley route from Ovington Motors using two ADC 416 vehicles and one AEC 426, with the company situated at a depot in Sutton-on-the-Forest, where the company still operates to this day.

Edward Sheriff died in 1965, and the company was taken over by his daughter Carol and her husband Richard Shelton, who ran the company until 1980. During their tenure, they updated the fleet with Bristol buses which were purchased from West Yorkshire Road Car Company as well as two brand new Seddon RU single-deck vehicles. However, due to reliability issues, they were replaced by Willowbrook bodied Bedfords five years later.

In 1980, following 52 years of ownership from the Sheriff family, the company was sold to John and Maragret Duff. The livery was reverted back to its original cream and green colours from its original red during the company's tenure with the Sheltons.

In 2013, following a successful bid for funding by City of York Council, the company was allocated £22,000 to install catalytic-reductive exhausts to two buses to reduce greenhouse gas emissions. In 2020, the company received an additional £126,000. This funding included £72,000 to retrofit four buses and £54,000 towards the cost of three new environmentally friendly vehicles, in preparation of the forthcoming implementation of a Clean Air Zone in York city centre.

In 2022, the company partnered with Ticketer, a ticket machine manufacturer, to develop a road restriction alert system. The system was designed to mitigate risks associated with low-clearance structures by utilising a national database of road restrictions, alerting drivers via their ticket machine when approaching height or width restricted structures such as low bridges and narrow archways.

In October 2024, following a successful trial in 2023, the previously seasonal summer-only route 74 now runs throughout the winter months.

In December 2024, the company announced that operation of all four of their routes (30, 31X, 40 and 74), as well as two school routes, will be taken over by Transdev York & Country from 19 January 2025. The company will continue to operate school and college services under contract to North Yorkshire Council.

== Services ==
Before being taken over by Transdev York & Country on 19 January 2025, the company ran four routes focused around the city of York:

Route	From	To	Via	Notes
30/30X	York	Thirsk	Easingwold	
31X	York	Kirkbymoorside	Easingwold; Helmsley	
40	York	Crayke	Easingwold; Sutton-on-the-Forest	
74	York	Grassington	Knaresborough; Harrogate; Otley; Ilkley; Bolton Abbey	

== Fleet ==
=== Depots ===
As of December 2024, Reliance operates from a single depot in Sutton-on-the-Forest, North Yorkshire.

=== Vehicles ===
The fleet prior to the takeover by Transdev consisted of diesel-powered vehicles, such as those manufactured by Alexander Dennis (Enviro200 MMC), and MCV (Evora).

In February 2020, a Reliance double-decker bus hit a low rail bridge on Leeman Road in York and lost its roof. No injuries were reported, despite the driver of the bus being checked by paramedics on scene. Train services across the bridge resumed a few hours after the incident.

In January 2021, a Reliance single decker bus being driven out of service struck an oncoming vehicle, killing the driver of the car. The driver of the bus was later jailed for dangerous driving.
