= MCV Electric Bus =

Bus bodywork, available on electric Volvo chassis

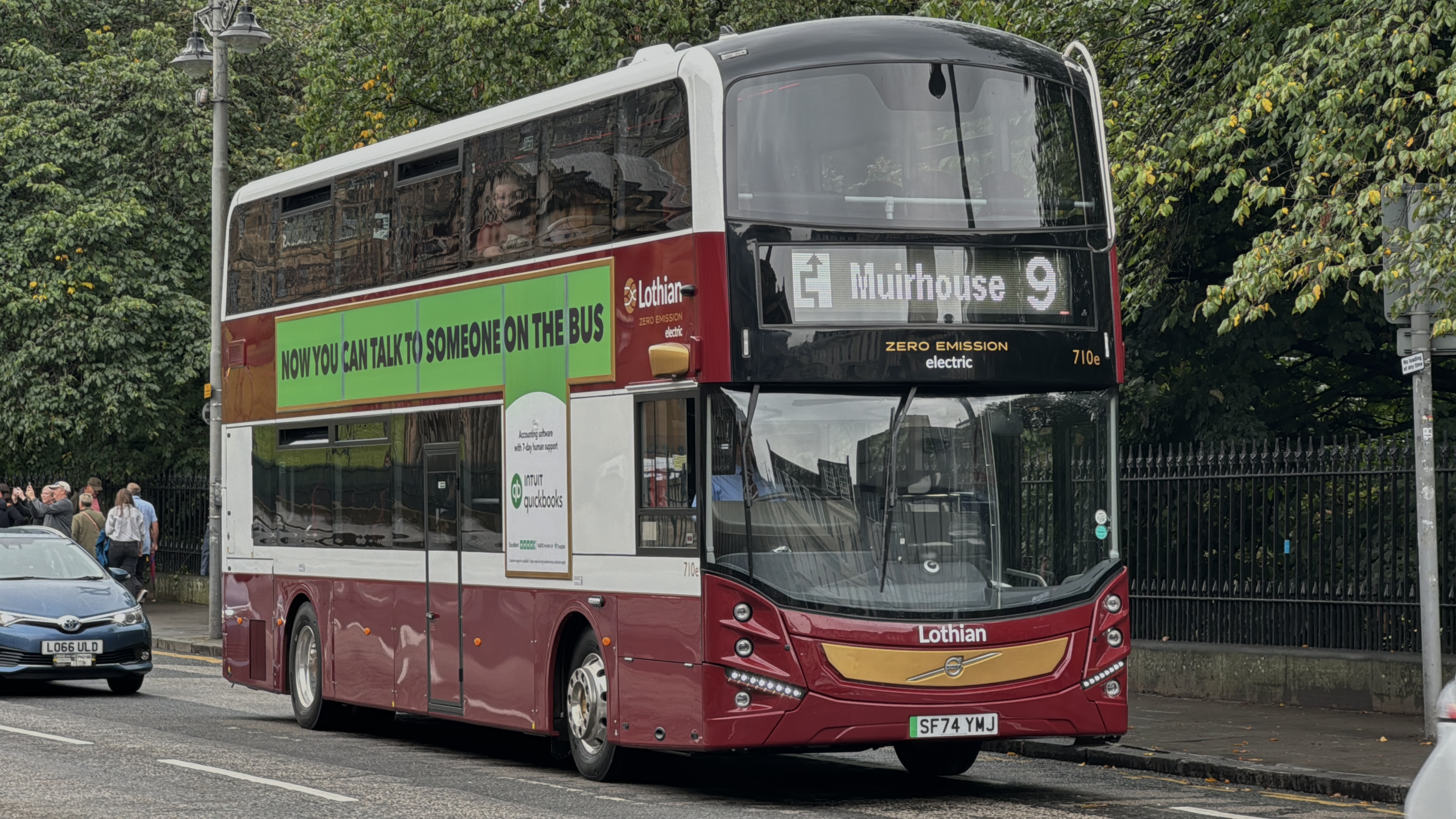
- A Lothian Buses MCV Electric Bus in Edinburgh

Overview
- Manufacturer: MCV
- Also called: Volvo BZL Electric
- Production: 2021-present

Body and chassis
- Class: Electric bus
- Doors: 1 or 2
- Floor type: Low floor
- Chassis: Volvo BZL
- Related: MCV Evora; MCV EvoSeti

Powertrain
- Transmission: Volvo I-Shift 2-speed AMT
- Battery: 282/376/470 kWh 600 V lithium iron phosphate

Dimensions
- Length: Single-decker bus; 9–13 metres (30–43 ft); Double-decker bus; 10.3–10.9 metres (34–36 ft)
- Width: 2,500 millimetres (8.2 ft)

The MCV Electric Bus (also known as the 'Volvo BZL Electric Bus') is a low-entry single-deck bus bodywork and a low-floor double-decker bus bodywork built by MCV Bus & Coach in partnership with Volvo Buses as the zero-emissions alternative to the MCV Evora and MCV EvoSeti. It was unveiled in September 2021 by Volvo.

== Description ==
=== Single Decker ===
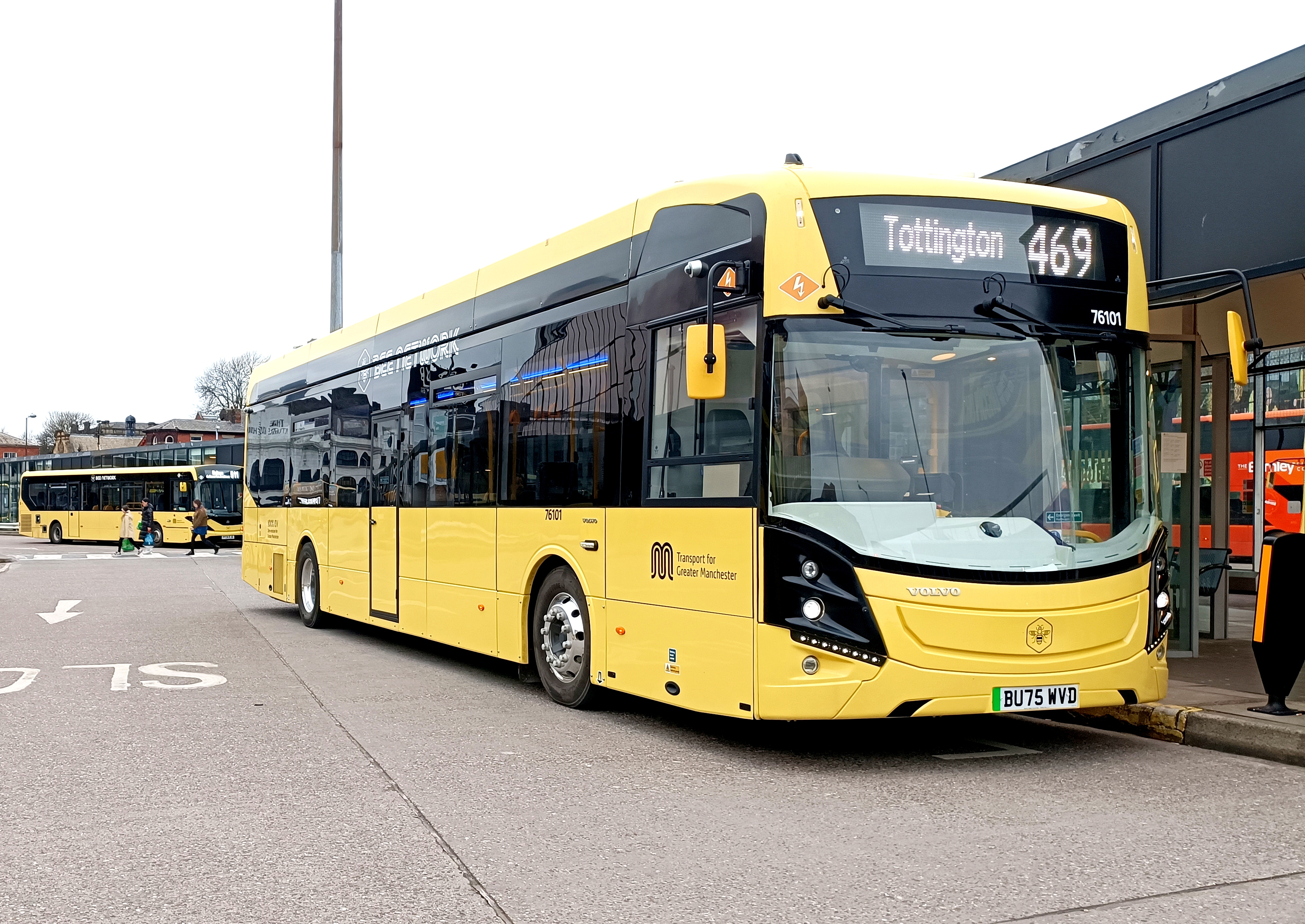
A single decker MCV electric bus

The single decker variant is available in lengths of 9m, 9.7m, 10.4m, 10.8m, 11.4m, 12.2m & 13m all lengths are available with 1 door and all lengths except 9m are available with 2 doors (Transport for London specification) The name of the bodywork is determined on the length for example the C093 EV represents the 9m and 9.7m variants and C103 EV represents the 10.4m and 10.8m variants etc.

=== Double Decker ===
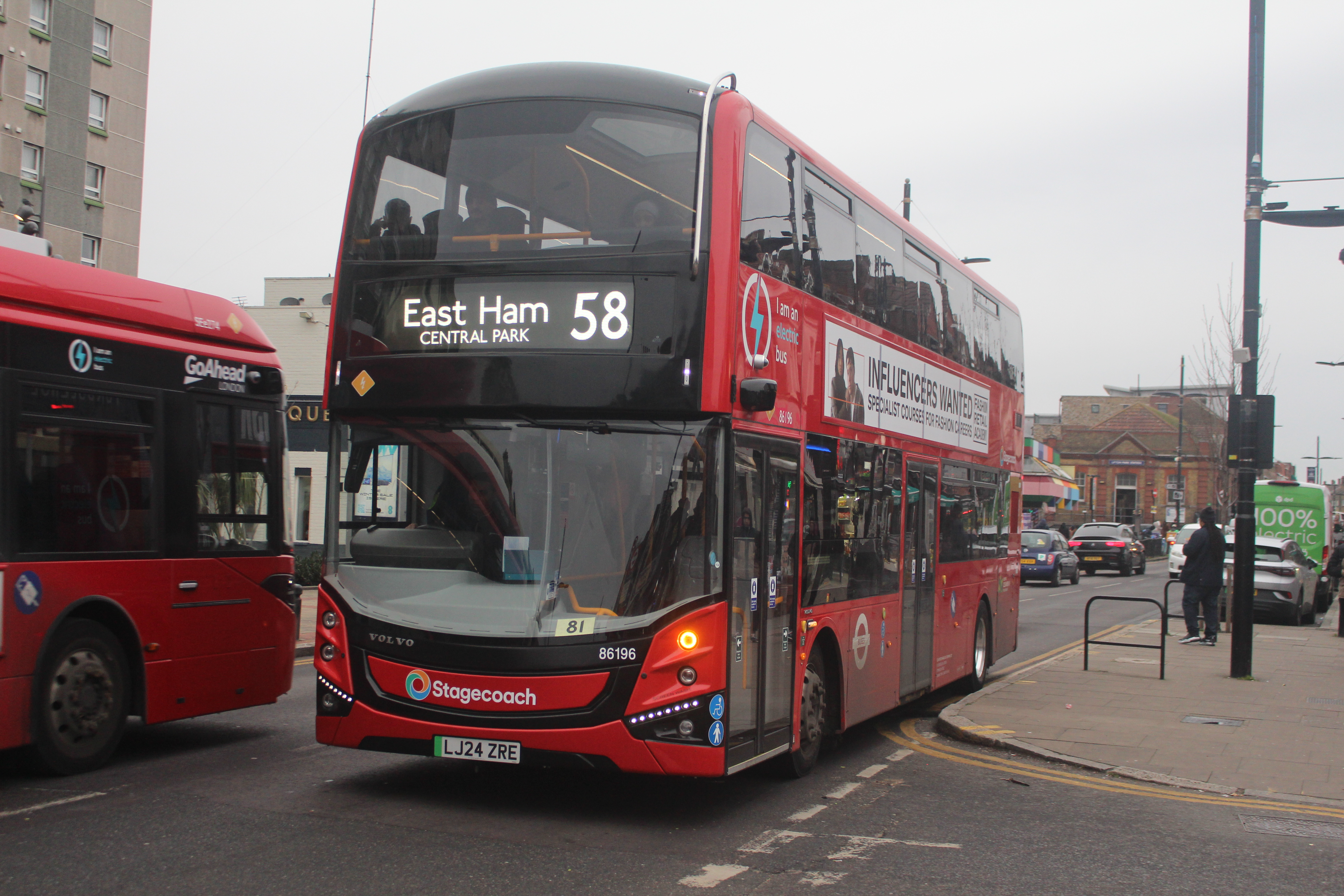
A double decker MCV Electric bus

The double decker variant is only available with MCV D113 EV bodywork in either 10.3m or 10.9m. It is also available with either 1 or 2 doors (Transport for London specification) like the single decker variant.

== See also ==
- Volvo BZL single-deck & double-deck - the chassis that the MCV / BZL Electric Bus is fitted with
- List of buses
