= MCV EvoTor =

Coach bodywork on Volvo chassis

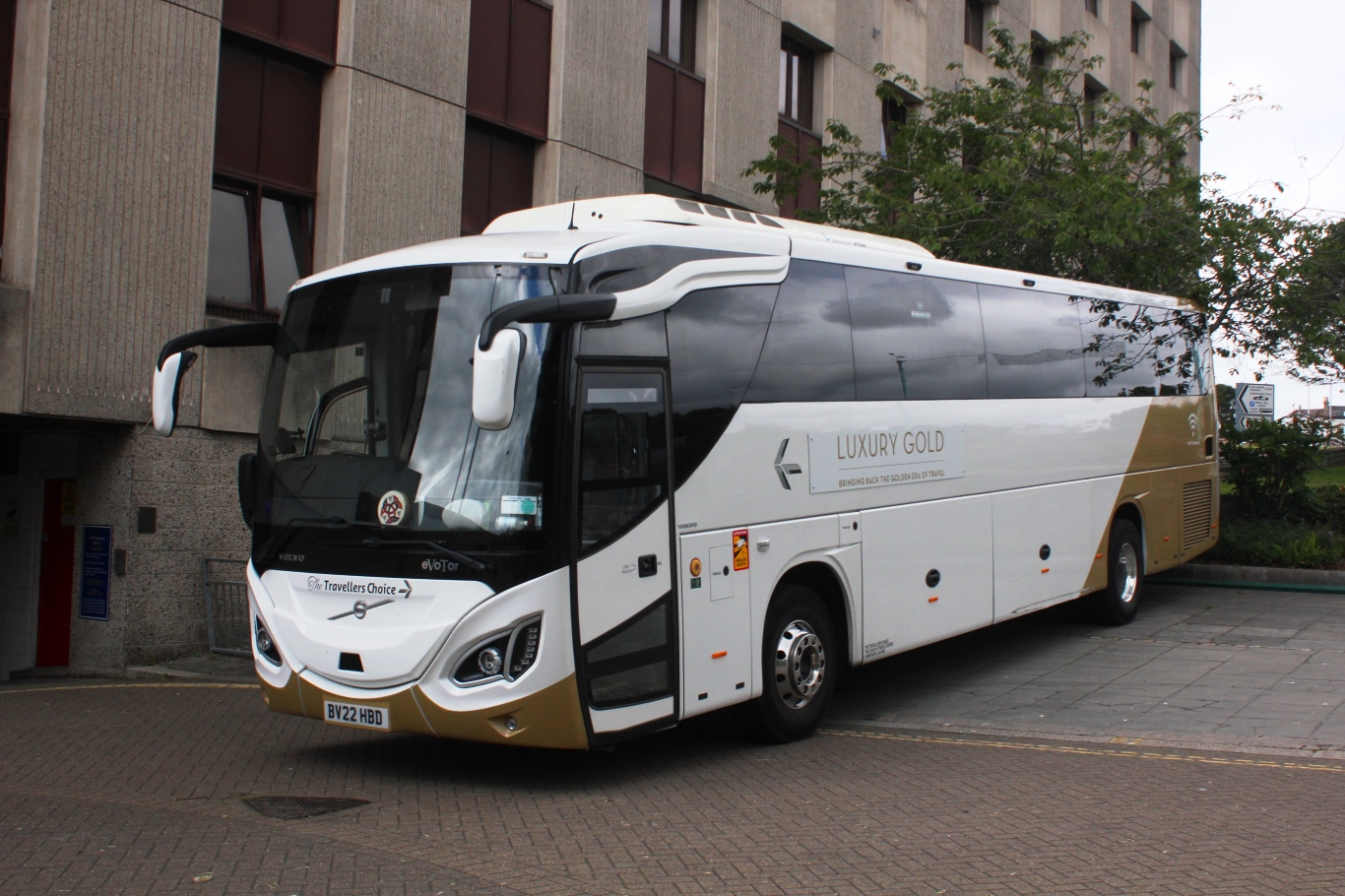
- The Travellers Choice MCV EvoTor bodied Volvo B11R in Plymouth in July 2022

Overview
- Manufacturer: Manufacturing Commercial Vehicles (MCV)
- Production: 2018–
- Assembly: El Salheya, Egypt

Body and chassis
- Class: Coach bodywork
- Doors: 1 (front door only)
- Floor type: Step-entrance
- Chassis: Volvo B11R; Volvo B8R

Powertrain
- Engine: Rear-mounted Euro VI 10.8-litre I-6 Volvo D11K
- Capacity: 53–55, all seated
- Power output: 430–460 bhp
- Transmission: 12-speed Volvo I-Shift AT2142F

Dimensions
- Length: 12.6 metres (41 ft)
- Width: 2.55 metres (8.4 ft)
- Height: 3.60 metres (11.8 ft)

The MCV EvoTor (stylised as eVoTor; internal designation MCV 523) is a model of coach bodywork produced by Manufacturing Commercial Vehicles (MCV) on Volvo B11R chassis since 2018, mainly for the United Kingdom and Ireland market. The first production EvoTor was unveiled at the 2018 Euro Bus Expo at the National Exhibition Centre, Birmingham on 30 October 2018. The EvoTor is MCV's first coach product for the British and Irish market, created in collaboration with Golden Tours, a long-standing MCV operator. The EvoTor is produced at the main MCV factory in El Salheya, Egypt.

The EvoTor is built as the entry-level body option to Volvo's B11R coach range, fitted on the twin-axle model only with a relatively fixed set of specifications in order to reduce costs. The bodywork construction is all-stainless steel, taking design cues from the existing MCV Evora and EvoSeti service buses, such as the general headlight design, which has been modernised slightly for the EvoTor. The EvoTor also comes as standard with reclining BRUSA Create passenger seats, induction heating, air conditioning and Bosch entertainment systems.

In November 2023, a facelifted EvoTor built on the Volvo B8R chassis was announced.

== Operators ==
Golden Tours are the launch customer and largest operator of the EvoTor, taking delivery of the first eight production vehicles in May 2019. One has been delivered to Ashwood Travel of Chalfont St Peter. One has gone to Ridleys. One has also gone to Skills, Nottingham with another one soon and 5 more on order for Silverdale, Nottingham.

Redwing Coaches ordered the first six facelifted EvoTors on Volvo B8R chassis in January 2024.

Transport for Wales placed an order for eight EvoTors on Volvo B8R chassis in June 2026 in preparation for tendering an operator for its TrawsCymru North-South Wales express coach service, which is set to launch in autumn 2026.
