= MCV DD102 =

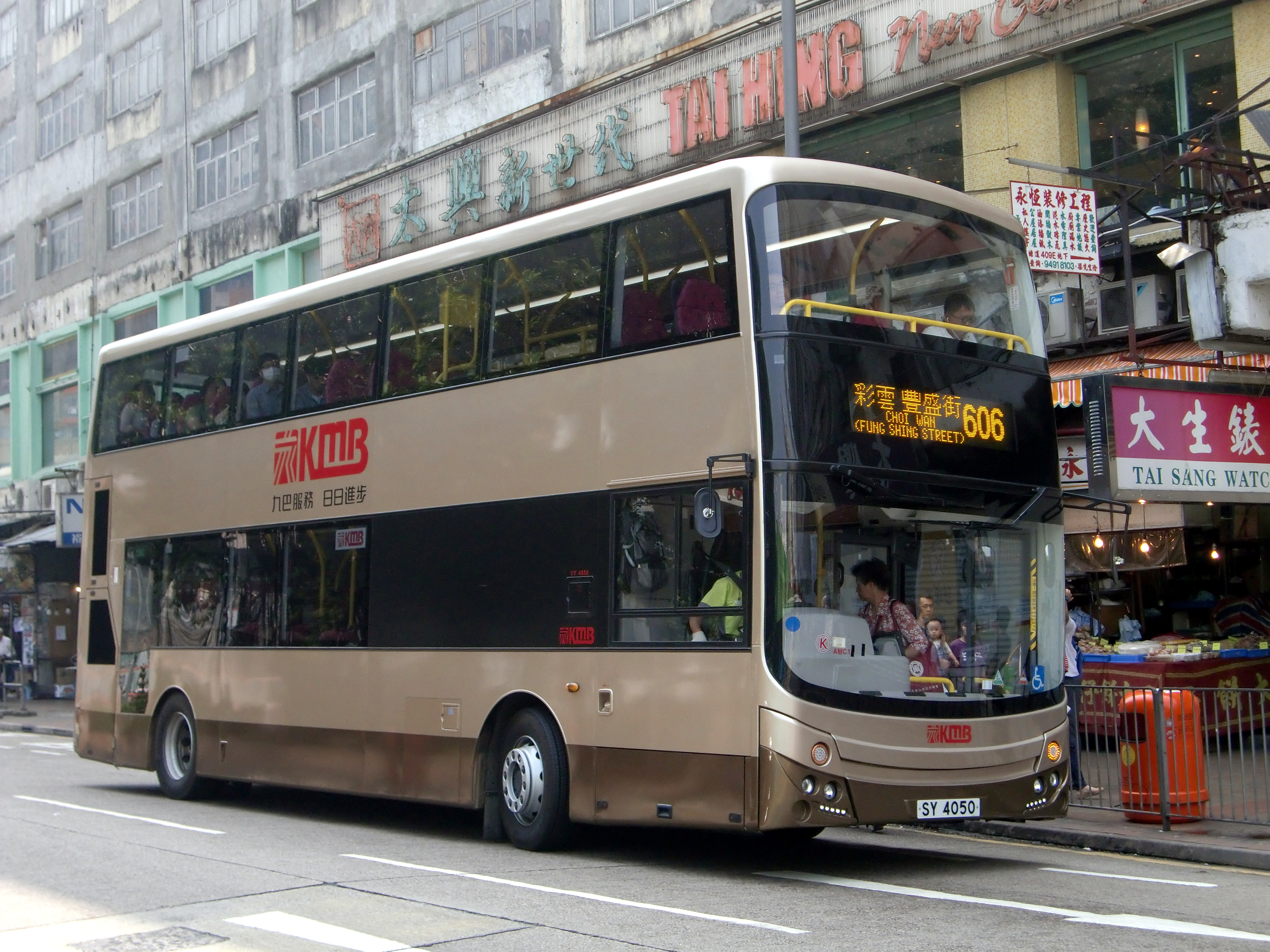
- Kowloon Motor Bus MCV DD102 bodied VDL DB300 in October 2014

Overview
- Manufacturer: MCV

Body and chassis
- Doors: 2
- Floor type: Low floor
- Chassis: VDL DB300
- Related: MCV DD103

Powertrain
- Engine: Cummins ISB6.7E5-250B
- Power output: 183 kW

Dimensions
- Length: 10.49 metres
- Width: 2.55 metes
- Height: 4.38 metres

Chronology
- Successor: MCV EvoSeti

The MCV DD102 is a double-decker bus body built by MCV. The bodywork is of the same style as the MCV DD103 however is instead built on VDL DB300 chassis.

== Hong Kong ==
In January 2014, Kowloon Motor Bus of Hong Kong received the first example of the bus for evaluation. KMB decided to opt for other similar buses and so no more of this model were ever produced.

== See also ==
- MCV DD103, similar bodywork mounted on Volvo B9TL chassis
