= MCV Evolution =

Single-deck bus bodywork

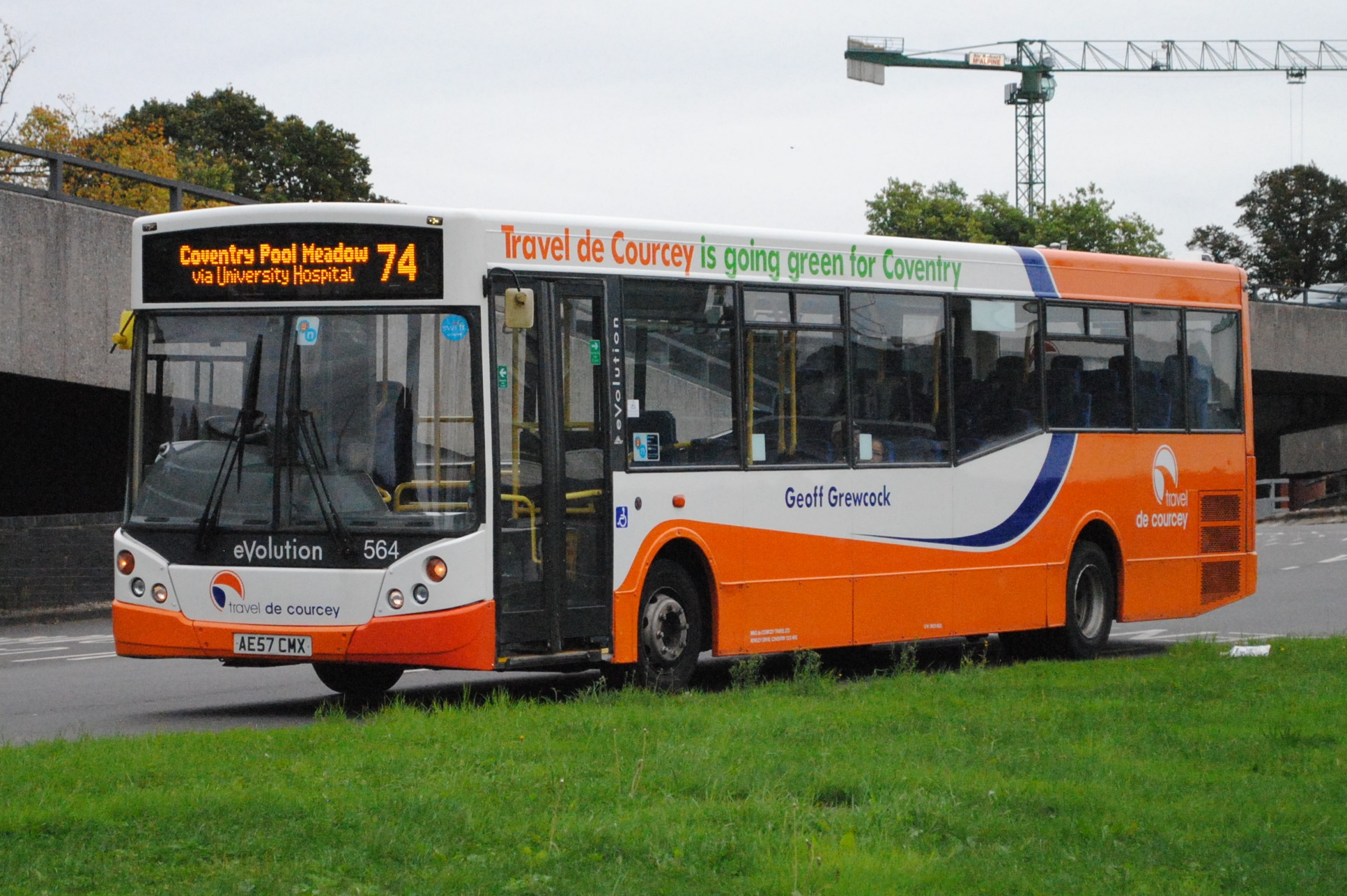
- Travel de Courcey MCV Evolution-bodied MAN 12.240 in Coventry in September 2016

Overview
- Manufacturer: MCV
- Production: 2003–2018
- Assembly: Egypt

Body and chassis
- Doors: 1 or 2
- Floor type: Low floor Low entry
- Chassis: Alexander Dennis Dart SLF; Alexander Dennis Enviro200; MAN A22; MAN A66 (14.220/14.240); MAN A76 (12.220/12.240); Mercedes-Benz OC500LE; VDL SB180; VDL SB200 (one only); Volvo B7RLE; Volvo B8RLE

Powertrain
- Capacity: 27 to 41 seated

Dimensions
- Length: 8.5m to 12.1m
- Width: 2.5m
- Height: 3.0m

Chronology
- Predecessor: MCV Stirling
- Successor: MCV Evora

The MCV Evolution (stylised as eVolution; internal designation: MCV C102) is a low floor and low entry single-decker bus body built by Manufacturing Commercial Vehicles. It was unveiled in 2003 as the successor to the MCV Stirling. The MCV Evolution 2 (internal designation: MCV C124RLE) was launched, initially on Mercedes-Benz chassis in 2011.

== Design ==
The MCV Evolution is based on the previous Stirling body, retaining a rounded roof dome, albeit no longer peaked, and having options for either a double-curvature windscreen or a single-curvature windscreen. The Evolution body was first offered on the MAN 12.220 (A76), 12.240 (A76), 14.220 (A66) and 14.240 (A66) however there were plans to body on an even shorter MAN chassis, the 10.220, which can be built as short as 8.5m long. From late 2005 it was offered on the Alexander Dennis Dart SLF chassis. In October 2009, MCV and dealer Arriva Bus & Coach unveiled a MCV Evolution VDL SB180 at Coach and Bus Live 2009.

The MCV Evolution was also offered on larger full-size single-decker bus chassis, such as the Volvo B7RLE, Volvo B8RLE, MAN A22 and Mercedes-Benz OC500LE. One Evolution body was built on VDL SB200 chassis in 2012 as a static demonstrator for the Arriva Bus & Coach dealership, being sold two years later to Welsh independent Richards Brothers of Cardigan. The Evolution was eventually replaced by the long-wheelbase MCV Evora on Volvo B7RLE chassis in 2018, although the Evolution 2 remained in production on shorter, more lightweight chassis.

The original Evolution body is internally designated by MCV as the C102 on Alexander Dennis, MAN, VDL, and Volvo chassis and as the C120LE on Mercedes-Benz chassis, while the Evolution 2 body is internally designated as the C124RLE on Mercedes-Benz and Volvo chassis and as the C130RLE on MAN chassis.

The low-entry Evolution 2 was adapted to left-hand drive configuration on the MAN A69 chassis by French manufacturer Fast Concept Car as the Fast Starter LE between 2012 and 2015, intended for sales in Continental Europe in competition with the Iveco Crossway.

== Operators ==
=== United Kingdom ===
Transport for London contractors Docklands Buses and Metroline both purchased examples.

The Evolution body is particularly popular with the United Kingdom's independent bus operators; the first Evolution 2 bodied Volvo B7RLEs were delivered to independent Pulhams Coaches of Bourton on the Water in 2012. East Yorkshire Motor Services took delivery of ten Evolution-bodied Volvos between 2014 and 2016, the first four on Volvo B7RLE chassis, while the remainder were delivered on the new B8RLE chassis.

Travel de Courcey of Coventry was another popular operator of MCV Evolutions, purchasing examples on both MAN and Mercedes-Benz chassis.

=== Hong Kong ===
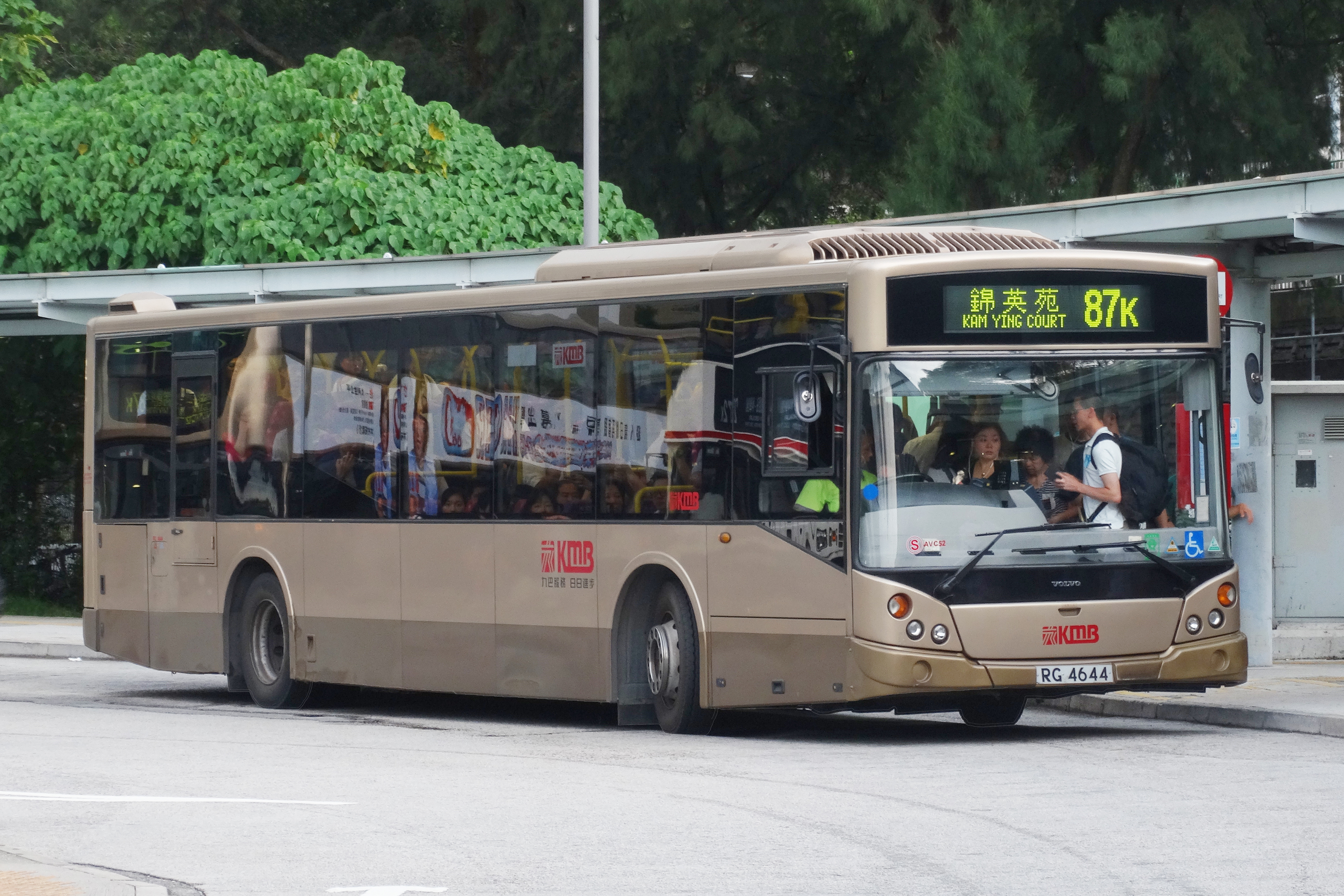
Kowloon Motor Bus MCV Evolution bodied Volvo B7RLE in Hong Kong in August 2015

Kowloon Motor Bus were the only purchaser of the MCV Evolution body in Hong Kong, taking delivery of 70 Evolutions built on Volvo B7RLE chassis in two batches between 2010 and 2012 for use on lower-capacity bus services in the region.

=== New Zealand ===
Tranzit Group of New Zealand purchased 58 Evolutions. Go Bus of New Zealand currently operates 43 of the type, 31 being the 15.250 MAN chassis and the remaining 12 being 14.240 MAN chassis.

=== Philippines ===
The Evolution has a handful of operators in the Philippines, with the main operators of Evolutions being the UBE Express Airport Bus and Bonifacio Global City operator BGC Bus. Delta Neo Solutions (DNS) also operates a handful of units for the Okada Manila Hotel, and briefly for the P2P Express Bus Service.

=== Singapore ===
In 2010, Singaporean bus operator SMRT Buses trialled an MCV Evolution bodied MAN A22 NL323F to evaluate their potential for replacing elderly Mercedes-Benz O405s. This trial resulted in an order for MAN A22s with Lion's City bodywork assembled by Gemilang Coachworks; after completing trial service, SMRT's MCV Evolution demonstrator was also rebodied with Lion's City Hybrid bodywork by Gemilang and exported to Australia to operate a Perth Airport shuttle service.

== Gallery ==
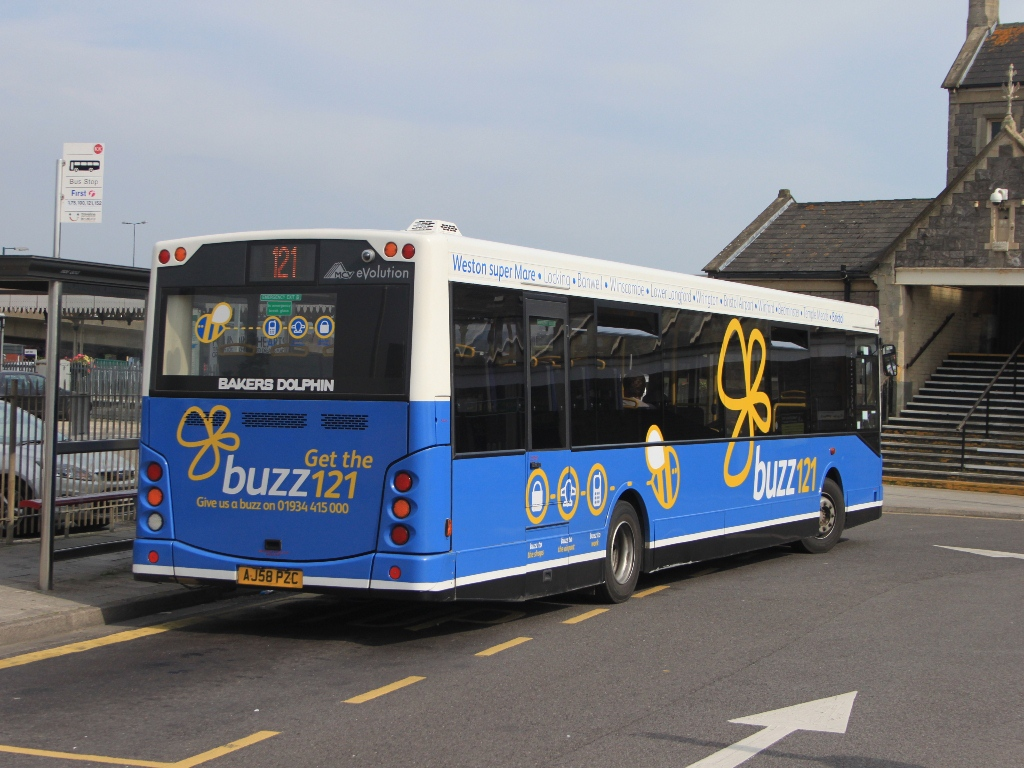
Bakers Dolphin MCV Evolution bodied MAN 14.240 rear at Weston-super-Mare station in August 2012

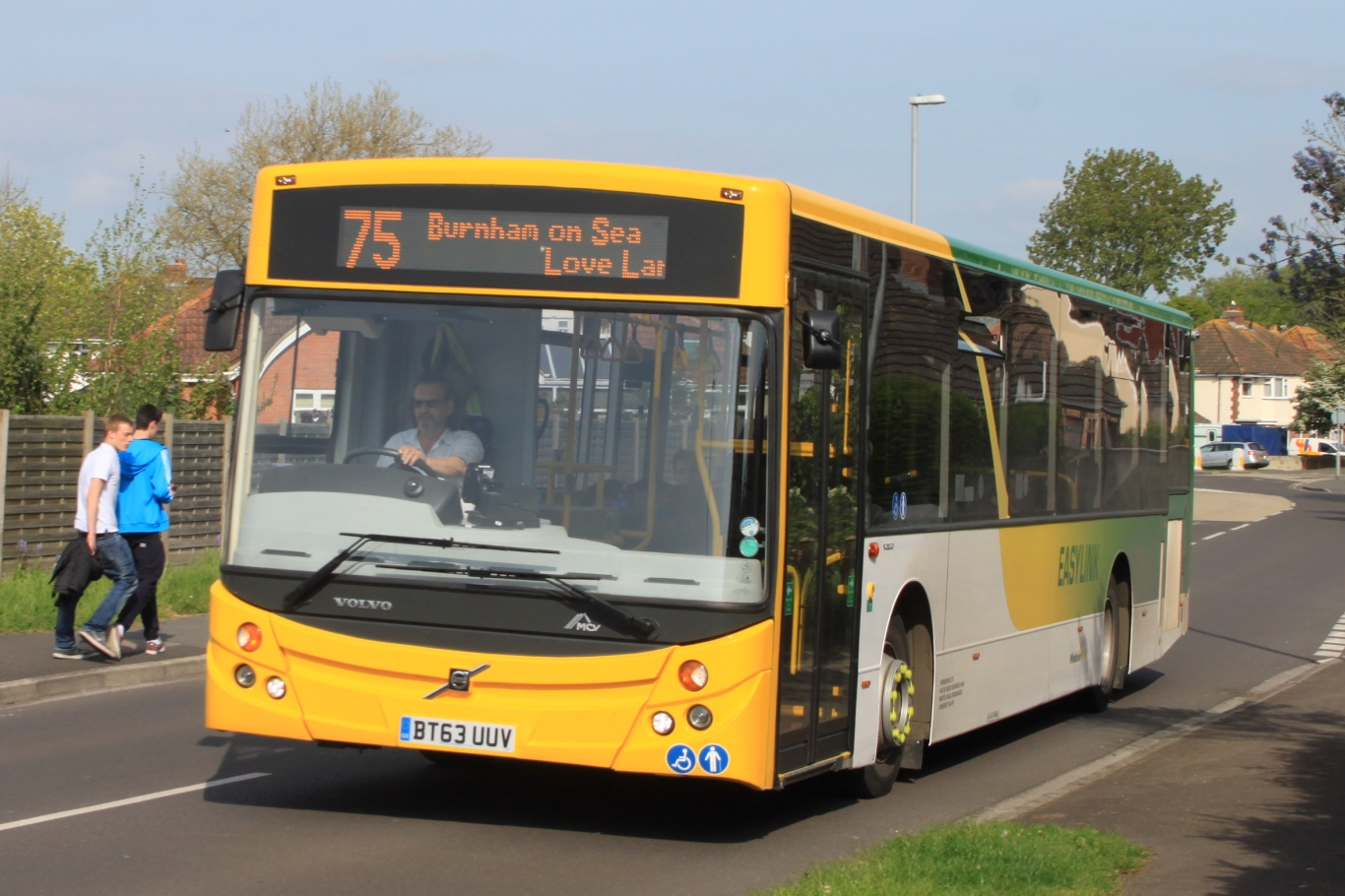
Webberbus MCV Evolution 2 bodied Volvo B7RLE in Burnham-on-Sea in May 2014

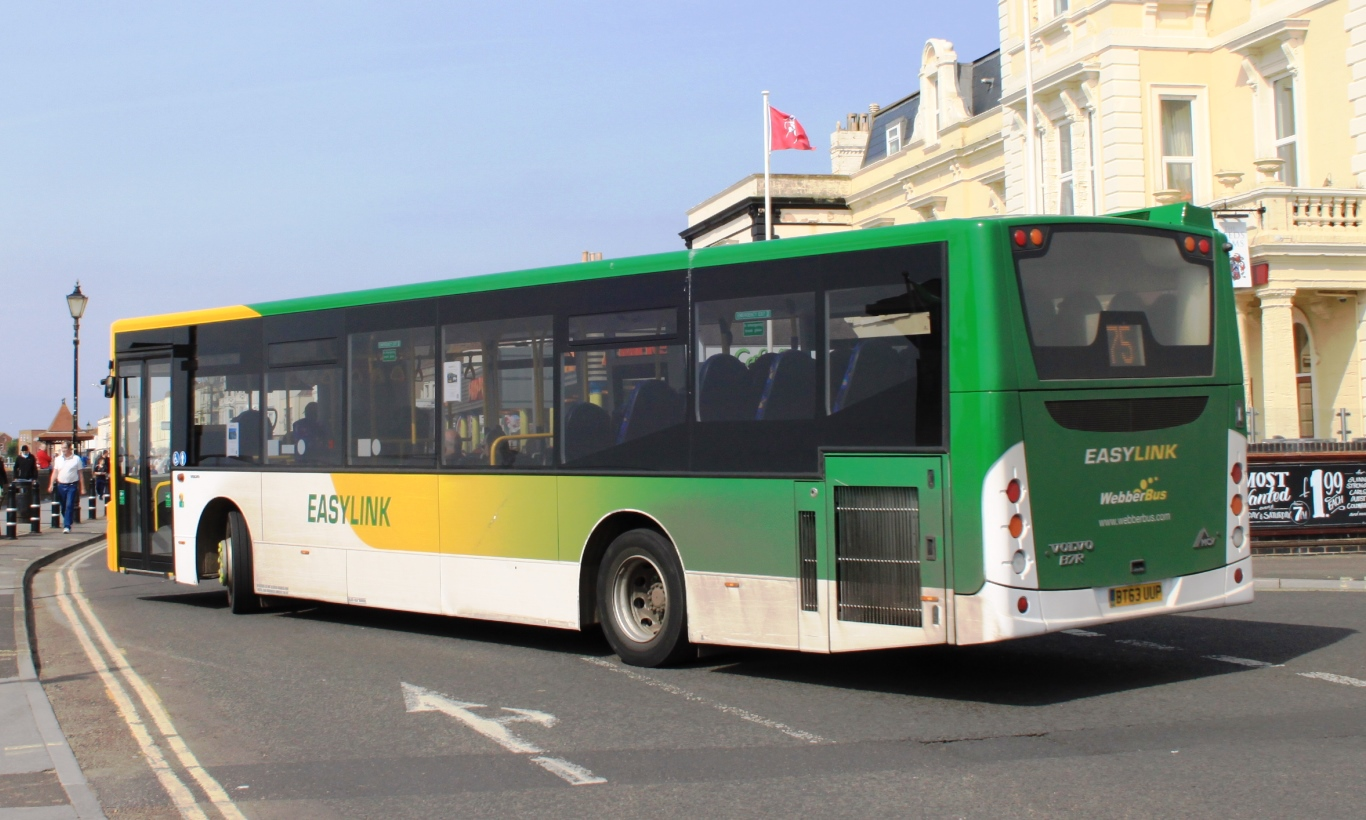
Webberbus MCV Evolution 2 bodied Volvo B7RLE in Burnham-on-Sea in May 2014

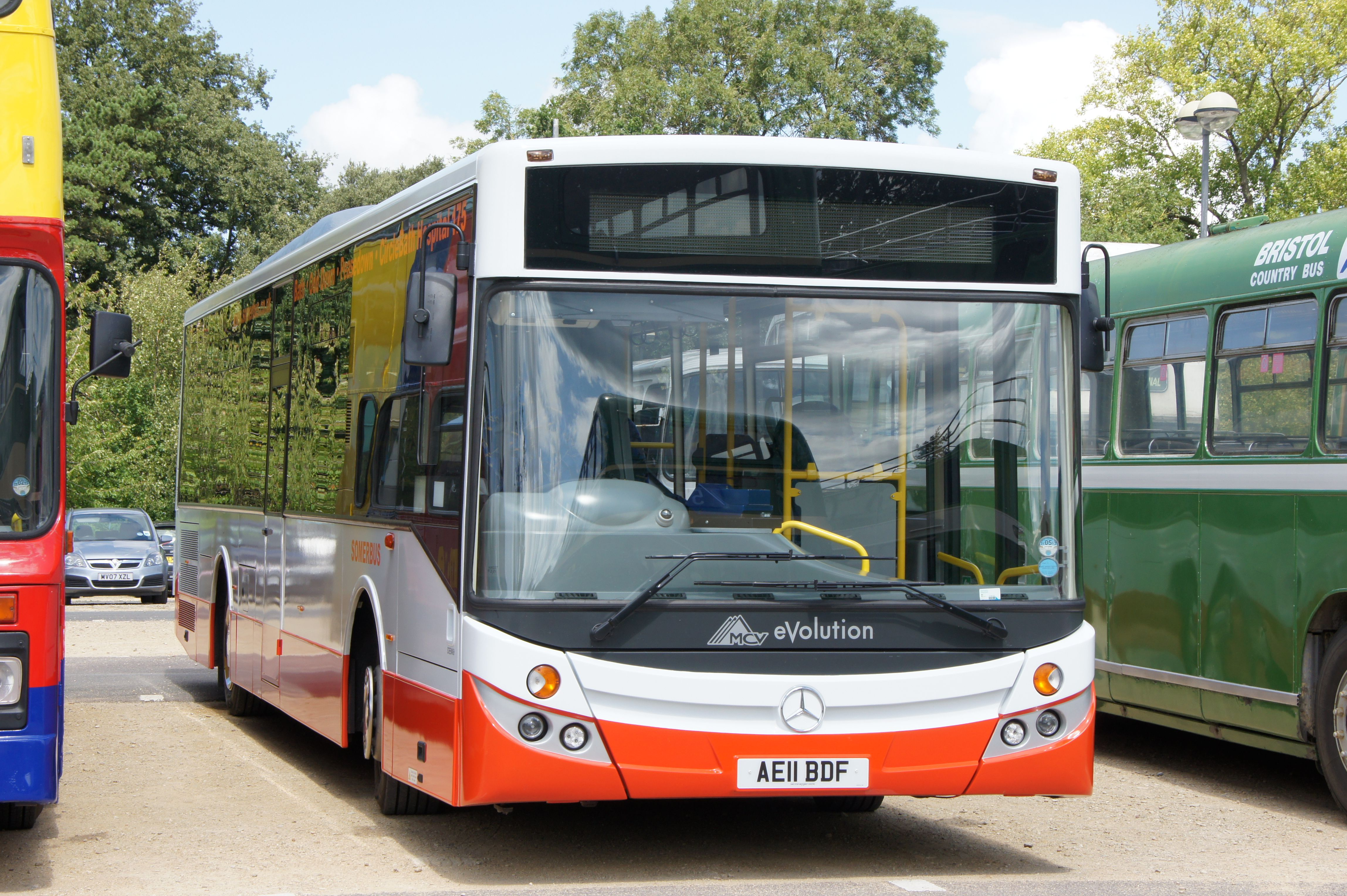
Somerbus MCV Evolution 2 bodied Mercedes-Benz OC500LE in July 2013
