= De Haan's Bus & Coach =

Company

De Haan's Bus & Coach is a South African bus manufacturer located in Parow, Cape Town. The company was founded by the emigrant brothers Luit and Nicholas de Haan in 1951. De Haan's Bus & Coach is known for its carriages and buses.

== History ==
The first model of the company was the 1952 introduced copy of the famous Zeederberg carriage. Six units of this model were built in this year for the Jan van Riebeeck Festival. The South African entrepreneurs had measured the dimensioning of the original model which can be shown at the Johannesburg Museum. For the manufacturing of the replicas, the brothers had used self-made sketches and detailed plans. The company became well-known quickly and sold their vehicles throughout the country. Particularly, the Gold Rush helped to achieve this success.

As this boom had an end in the early seventies, the company started the production of modern buses under the German MAN brand.

Currently, the company produces the bus models MAN Challenger 125, MAN Challenger 138 and MAN Challenger Superior 140. Since 2007 De Haan's is CKD assembling Mercedes-Benz buses on behalf of the Egyptian Manufacturing Commercial Vehicles for the local market. The company management is currently held by the two sons Peter and Andre de Haan. In March 2010, the company was bought by the MCV Corporate Group, but the company name remains.
