= MCV DD103 =

Low-floor double-decker bus body built by MCV Bus & Coach

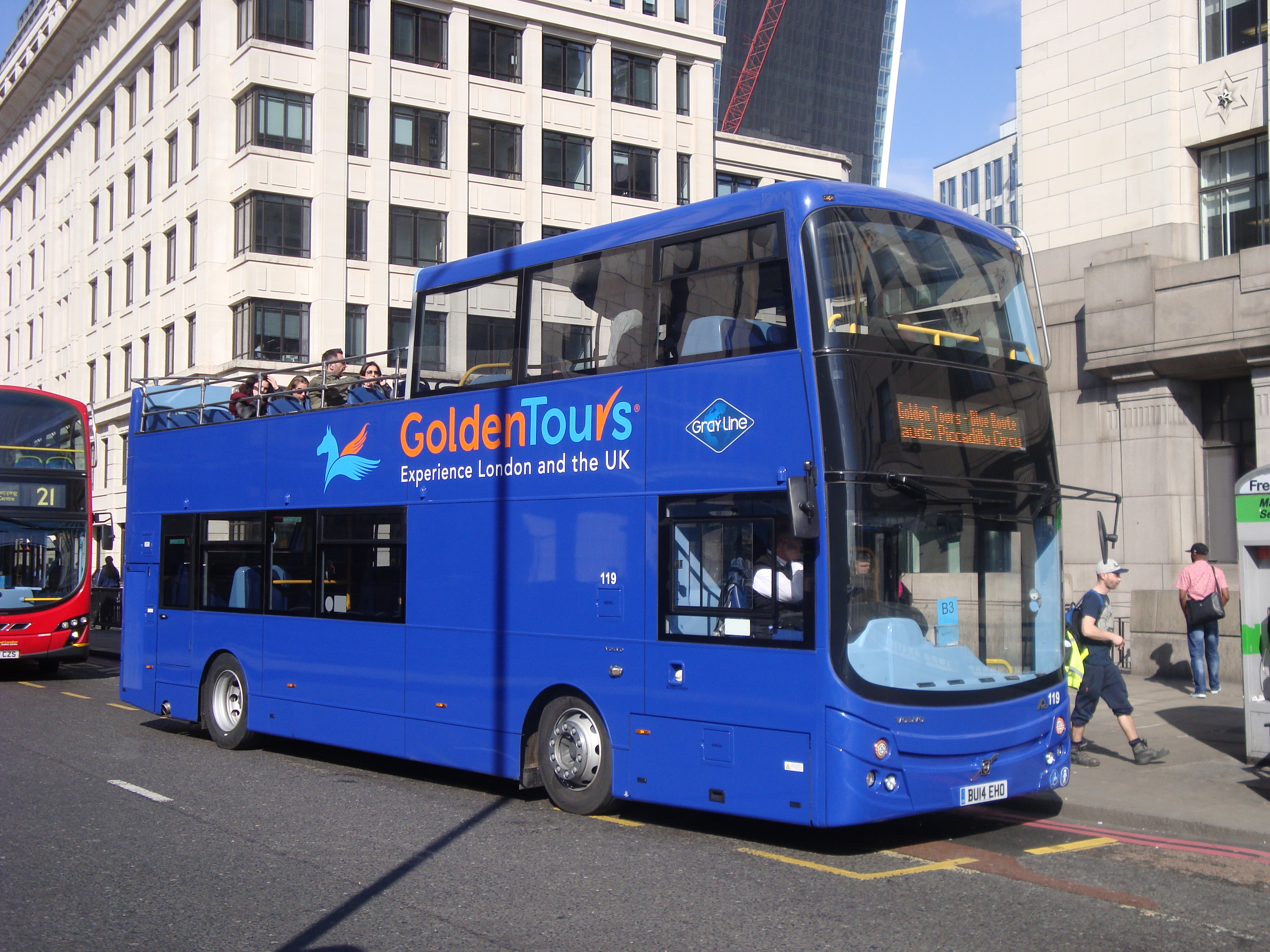
- Golden Tours MCV DD103 open top bodied Volvo B9TL in April 2014

Overview
- Manufacturer: MCV
- Production: 2011–2014

Body and chassis
- Doors: 1 or 2
- Floor type: Low floor
- Chassis: Volvo B9TL
- Related: MCV DD102

Dimensions
- Length: 10.2m or 10.8m
- Width: 2.5m
- Height: 4.3m

Chronology
- Successor: MCV EvoSeti

The MCV DD103 is a low-floor double-decker bus body built by MCV Bus and Coach built on the Volvo B9TL chassis. Most of them are built as open top variants instead of closed top buses.

The MCV DD103 was launched in May 2011. One was trialled in London by Docklands Buses and London United.

Golden Tours of London ordered nine in 2012, with six being open-top variants. A further 11 were delivered in 2014, all but one being open-top variants. Others are operated by Wessex Bus.

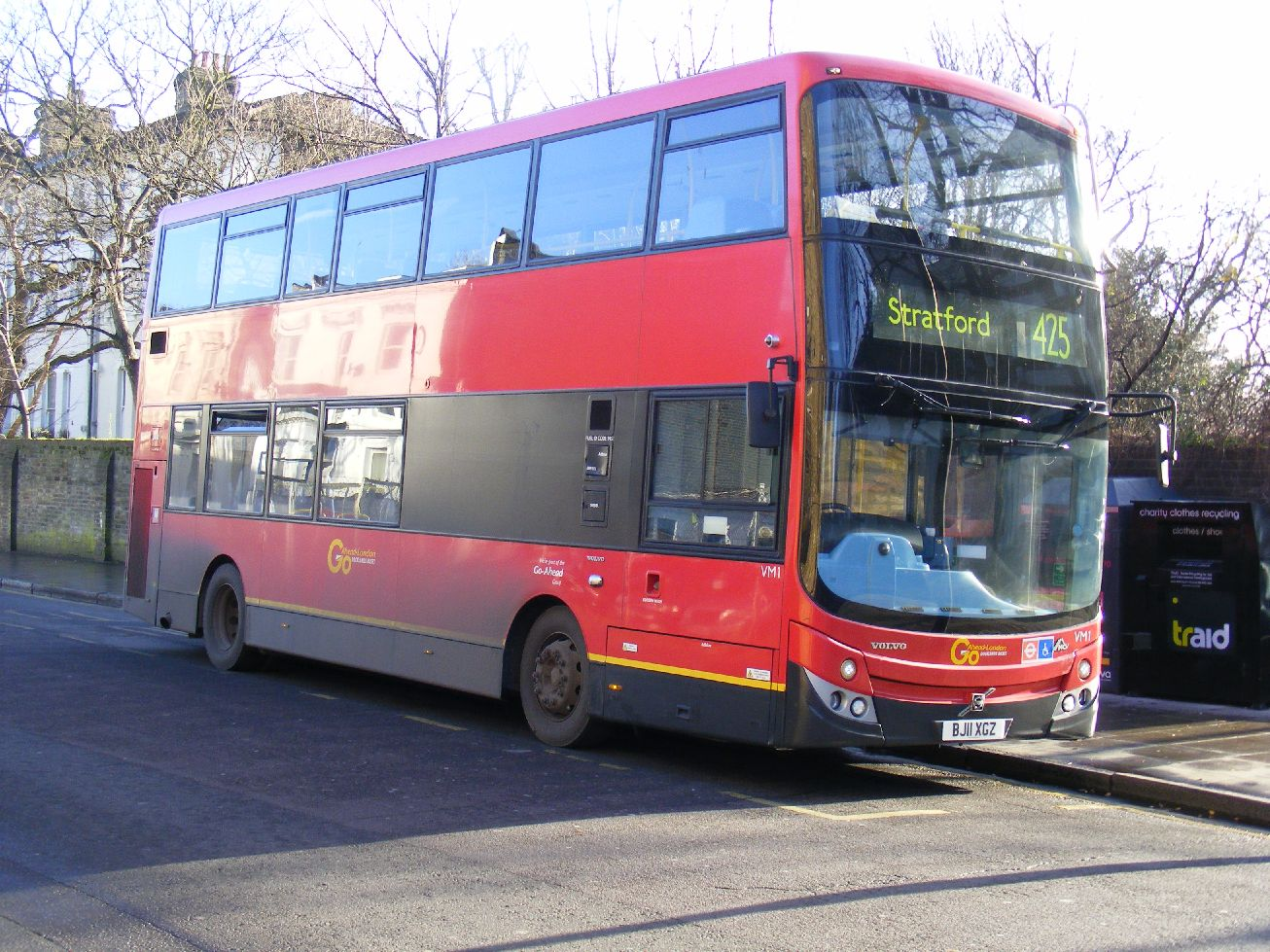
Docklands Buses closed-top bodied MCV DD103 on route 425 in 2012

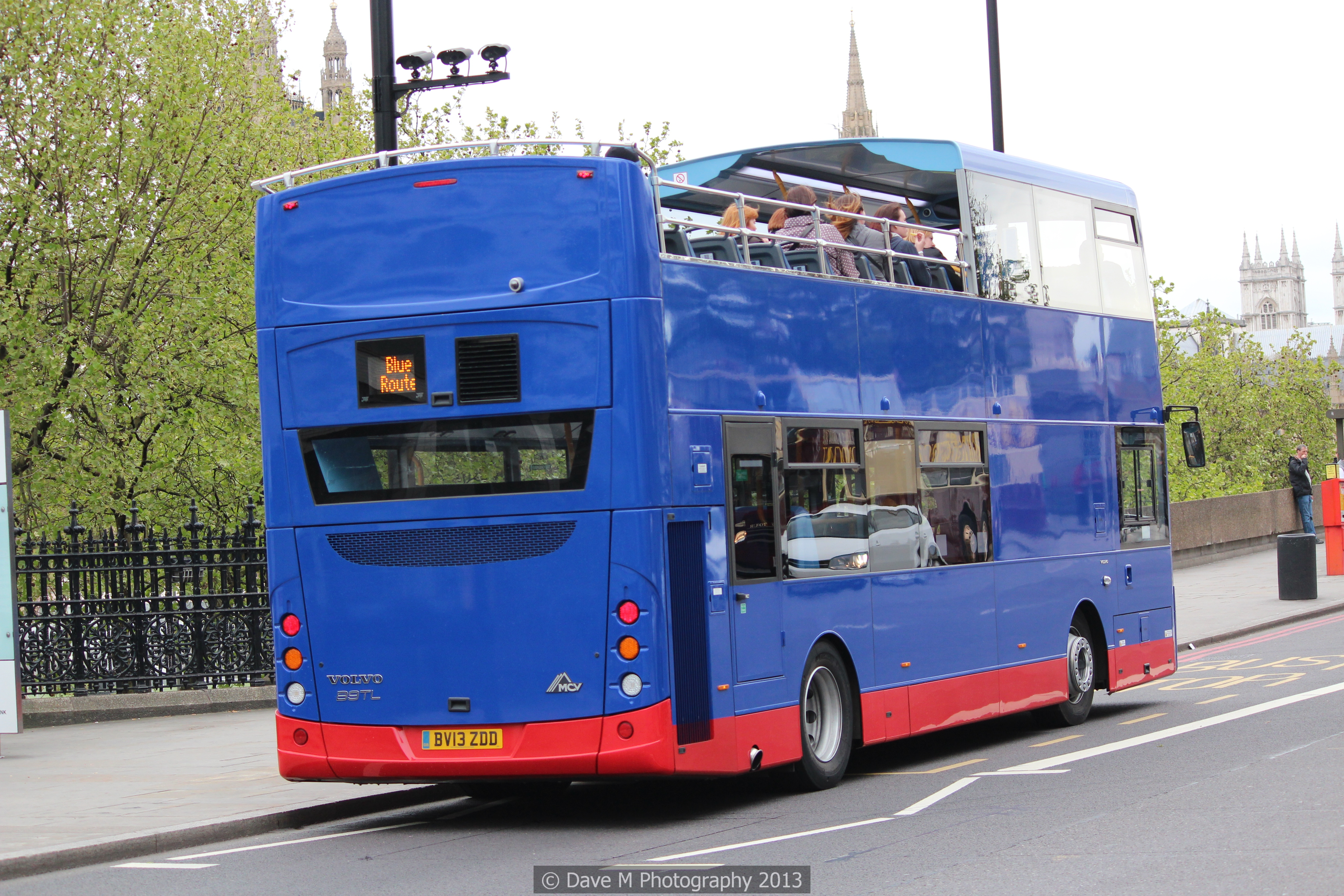
Golden Tours open top bodied MCV DD103 rear in 2013

== See also ==
- MCV DD102, similar bodywork mounted on VDL DB300 chassis
