= Golden Tours =

Open top bus operator and coach tour operator based in London

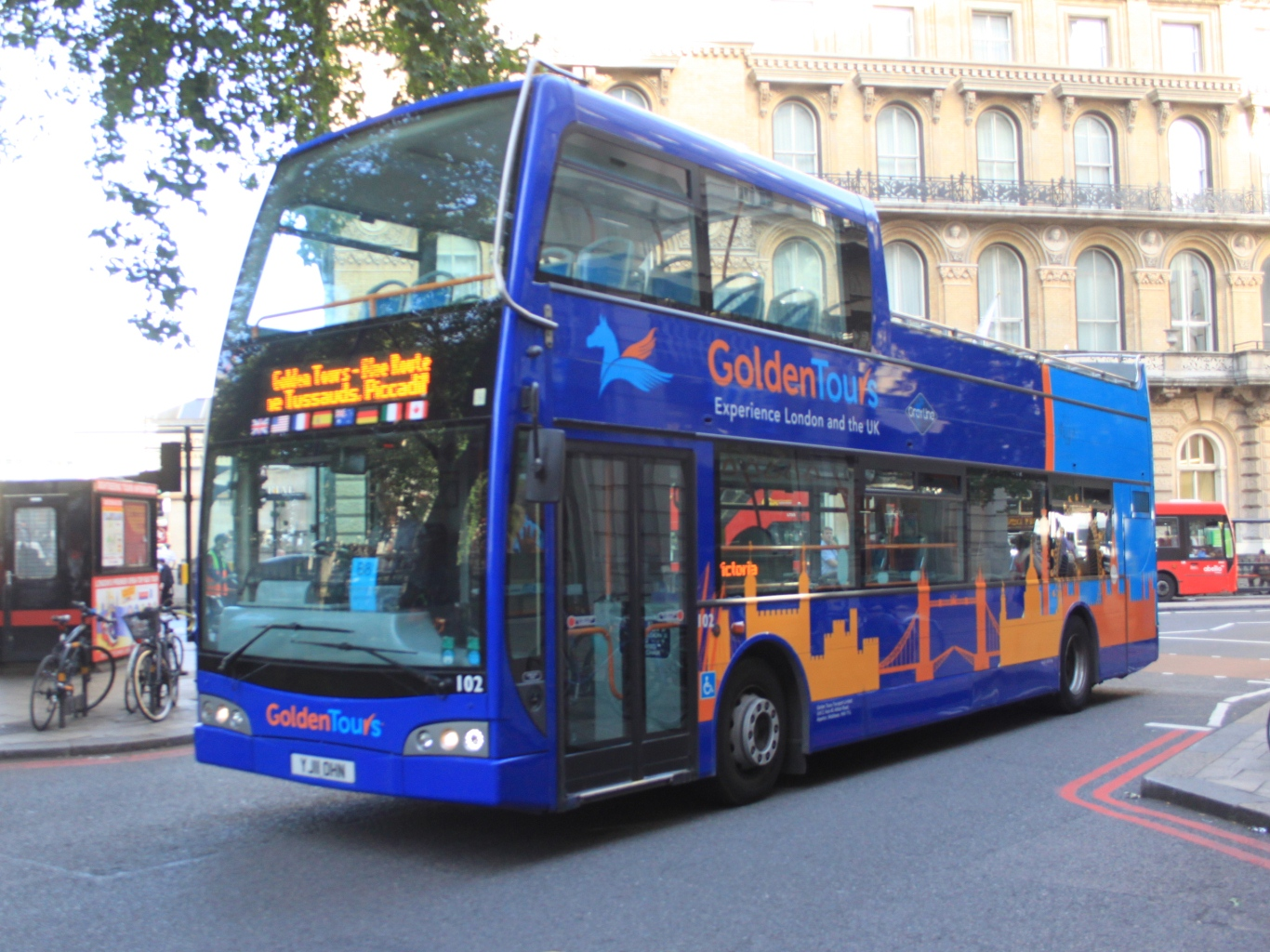
- Optare Visionaire bodied Volvo B9TL on Grosvenor Gardens, in 2014
- Founded: 1984
- Headquarters: Alperton
- Service area: London; Windsor; York
- Service type: Sightseeing tours
- Depots: 1
- Fleet: 67 (November 2019)
- Website: www.goldentours.com

Golden Tours is a British open top bus and coach tour operator based in Alperton, London.

== History ==
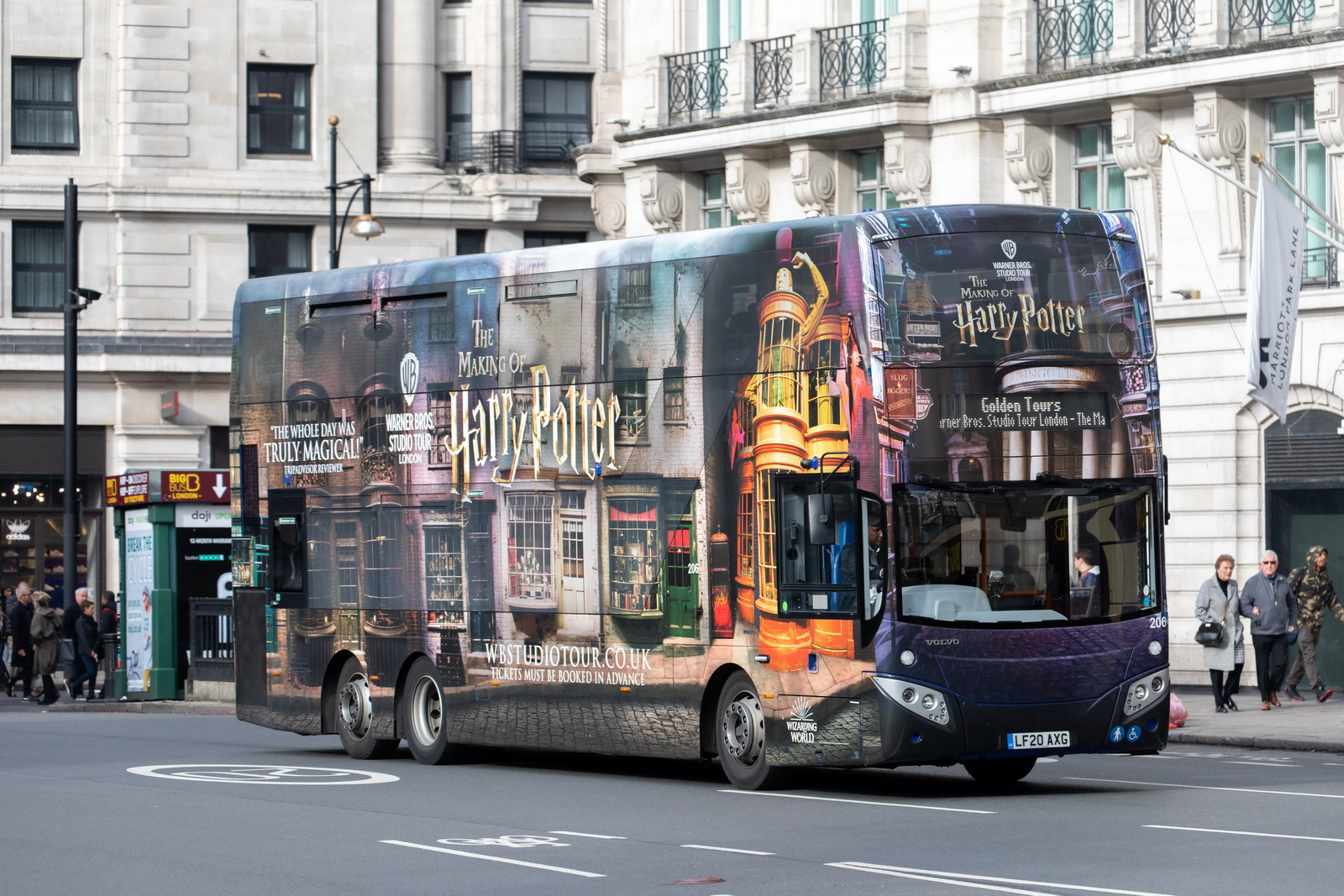
MCV EvoSeti bodied Volvo B8L Warner Bros. Studio Tour shuttle bus at Marble Arch in September 2022

Golden Tours was established in 1984, initially operating airport transfers and day trips from London to tourist destinations across England, such as Stonehenge and the Roman Baths. In 2001, Golden Tours acquired the business of Frames Rickards, which included the London franchise for Gray Line.

In June 2011, Golden Tours began operating open top bus services within Central London. This operation was further expanded out to York in July 2020, with open top services operated in partnership with York Pullman, and later to Windsor in December 2020. In June 2021, Golden Tours entered a partnership with Yellow Coaches to operate open top services in Bournemouth.

Golden Tours became the preferred partner of Warner Bros. Studio Tour London in early 2012, offering transport on a branded bus to and from the studio tour from locations in central London by bus.

In 2019, Golden Tours launched an Afternoon Tea Bus Tour of London, operating on a double-decker bus, combining traditional British afternoon tea with a sightseeing experience. Over the following years, the company expanded the concept by introducing a range of themed variations, including seasonal and musical-led experiences. In addition to its London operations, Golden Tours also introduced a standard afternoon tea bus tour in Windsor, extending the offering beyond the capital.

In April 2026, Golden Tours unveiled the World’s First Electric Routemaster Bus and launched a London Routemaster Sightseeing Tour. The original Routemaster was converted to an open-top bus before being converted to a fully electric-powered vehicle in partnership with Magtec.

=== Incidents ===
A Golden Tours sightseeing bus with 40 passengers occupying the top deck crashed into a tree on Woburn Place in August 2015, injuring four passengers including Polish national Ireneusz Luszczewski, who had his ear partially severed in the crash. It was later found that the crash had occurred when the driver of the bus took both hands off the steering wheel to consult a map. Golden Tours admitted 95% liability prior to a court hearing and was in line to pay damages to Luszczewski.

== Fleet ==
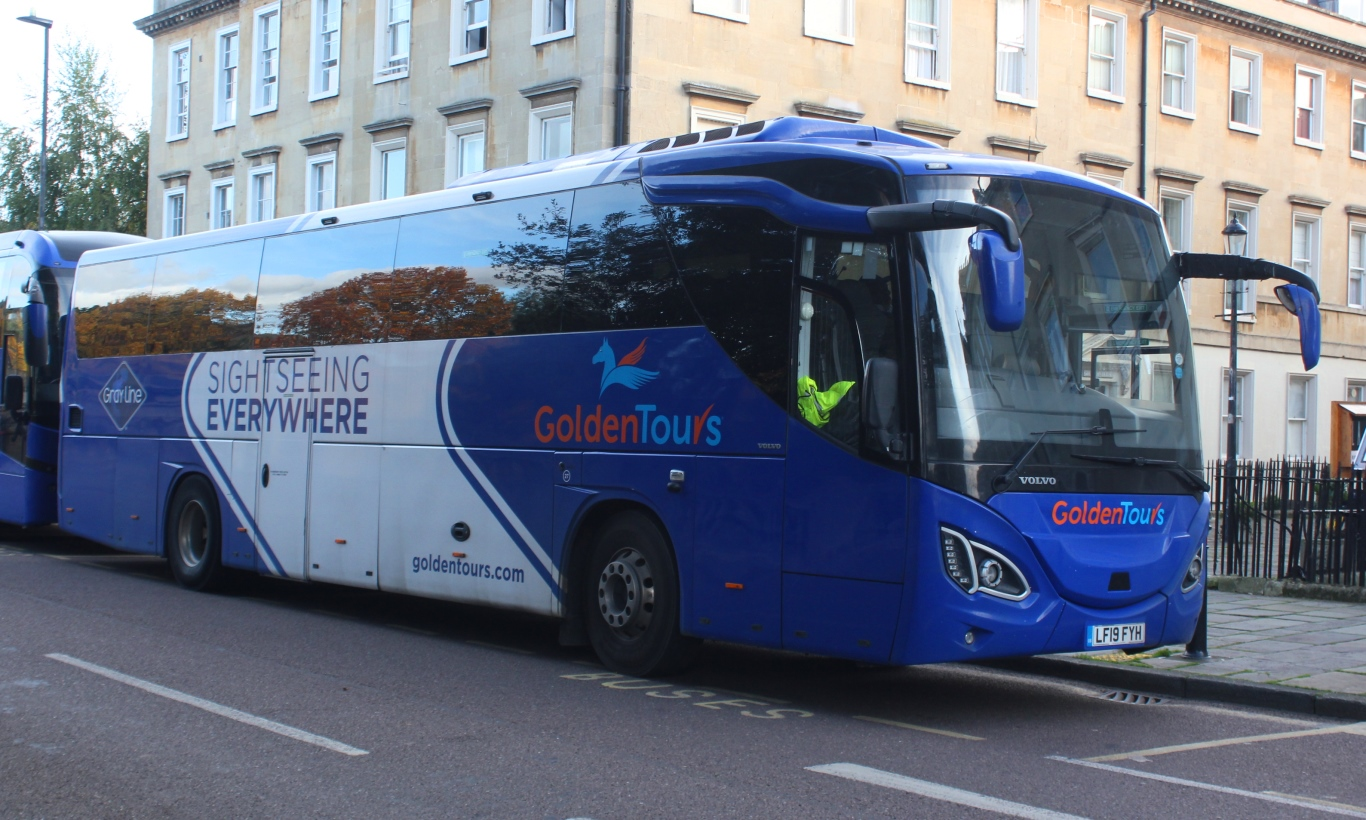
MCV EvoTor bodied Volvo B11R in Bath in October 2022

Golden Tours' London operations are based out of a depot in Alperton, which was opened in July 2013.

As of November 2019, the Golden Tours fleet consisted of 67 buses and coaches: 39 open top double-decker vehicles, consisting of Optare Visionaire and MCV DD103 bodied Volvo B9TLs, 19 coaches and 9 closed top double deckers. Eight closed top tri-axle MCV EvoSetis on Volvo B8L chassis were acquired for Warner Bros. Studio Tour work in 2020.
