= MCV Evora =

Low-floor bus bodywork on Volvo B8RLE and B5LH chassis

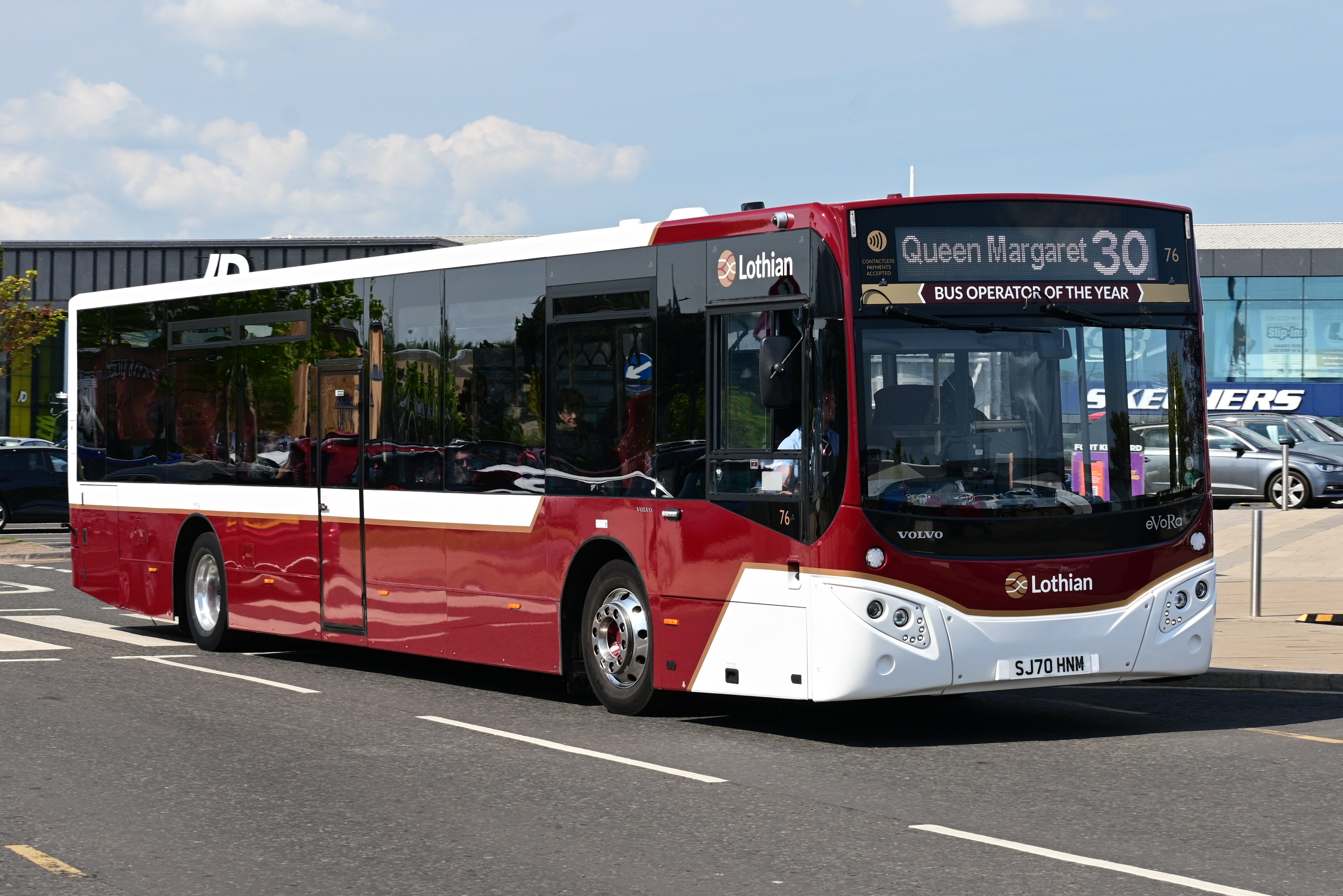
- Lothian Buses MCV Evora bodied Volvo B8RLE at Fort Kinnaird in May 2025

Overview
- Manufacturer: MCV
- Production: 2018–present
- Assembly: El Salheya El Gedida, Egypt

Body and chassis
- Doors: 1 or 2 doors
- Floor type: Low floor Low entry
- Chassis: Volvo B8RLE; Volvo B5LH

Powertrain
- Engine: Volvo D8K Euro VI; Volvo D5K
- Capacity: Up to 49 seated
- Transmission: ZF EcoLife 6AP200C 6-speed automatic Volvo I-Shift 12-speed

Dimensions
- Length: C113 - 10.8 m (35 ft 5 in); C123 - 12.2 m (40 ft 0 in); C133 - 12.9 m (42 ft 4 in)
- Width: 2.55 metres (8 ft 4 in)
- Height: 3.0 metres (9.8 ft)
- Curb weight: 10,800 kilograms (23,800 lb)

Chronology
- Predecessor: MCV Evolution

The MCV Evora (stylised as eVoRa; internal designation: MCV C113/C123/C133) is a single-decker bus bodywork produced by Manufacturing Commercial Vehicles (MCV) since 2018, as the successor to the MCV Evolution. The Evora is currently available on Volvo B8RLE and Volvo B5LH chassis.

In terms of styling, the Evora shares many features with the MCV EvoSeti double-decker bus, particularly the styling of the front and rear panels. The 12.2-metre model on Volvo B8RLE chassis has a capacity for up to 46 seats and 95 passengers including standing passengers. The Evora is also available on the shorter, 10.8-metre B8RLE chassis.

== Operators ==
=== United Kingdom ===
Uno were the first customer for the Evora, ordering six for their Hertfordshire routes, including the 610, in early 2018. Uno later took delivery of two more Evoras in August 2021. JJ Kavanagh and Sons became the first operator of the Evora in Ireland, taking delivery of three examples in early 2018, which was followed by the delivery of two Evoras to Slieve Bloom Coach Tours' Townlink Express operation in late 2019.

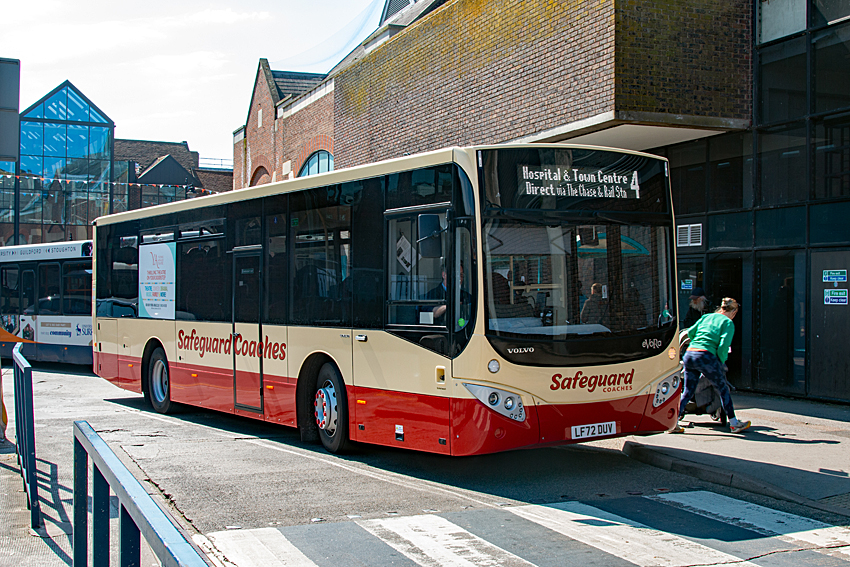
Safeguard Volvo B8RLE MCV Evora in Guildford

The MCV Evora is popular with independently-run bus companies. Significant operators include Sanders Coaches in Norfolk, who took delivery of 10 Evoras, six of these 10.8 m (35 ft 5 in) examples, between 2021 and 2023, while in Lanarkshire, 20 Evoras were delivered to Whitelaws of Stonehouse throughout 2021 and 2022, and nine Evoras were delivered to JMB Travel of Wishaw in May 2022. Other independent operators who have taken delivery of Evoras include York Pullman, Pulhams Coaches, Bland's of Rutland, Vision Bus, Celtic Travel, Reliance Motor Services, Safeguard Coaches, and Centrebus subsidiary D&G Bus.

The Stagecoach Group is another large operator of Evoras. Stagecoach South Wales were the first Stagecoach subsidiary to purchase Evoras, taking eight for the TrawsCymru network in 2019, while Stagecoach East have bought six for services on the Cambridgeshire Guided Busway. Stagecoach Highlands first received 25 Evoras for service contracts on the Orkney Islands in October 2021, with five of these being short 10.8 m examples, with 11 Evoras delivered for use on the Isle of Skye in November 2022, followed by an additional 20 delivered for use on the mainland during October 2023. Elsewhere in the Scottish Highlands, The Highland Council took delivery of six Evoras in December 2022, which are to be used on council-operated public and school bus services in the region from January 2023, while in November 2023, Isle of Lewis operator Lochs Motor Transport took delivery of a single 12.1 metres (40 ft) example.

Evoras are also popular on franchised bus networks including Greater Manchester's Bee Network, with sixteen each built to Bee Network specification delivered to Stagecoach Manchester and First Manchester between March and April 2024 for the rollout of Tranche 2 of the network, with two more Evoras were delivered in December 2025 to expand the latter's fleet. Six were delivered to Arriva Merseyside in May 2025 in preparation for the rollout of the Liverpool City Region's Metro network.

Arriva UK Bus ordered their first Evoras in 2021, with Arriva Midlands taking on 14 10.8m examples on Volvo B8RLE chassis in November for the Luton to Dunstable Busway, with another 30 delivered during 2025. Nine Evoras were delivered to Arriva Merseyside in January 2023, followed by 12 more Evoras for Arriva Buses Wales in February 2023 for services in Bangor.

Lothian Buses are also a large operator of Evoras, introducing a fleet of 30 12.9 m (42 ft 4 in) examples into service in January 2021. Welsh municipal operator Cardiff Bus took delivery of 20 Evoras in May 2026 for use on services between Cardiff, Penarth and Barry.

MCV Evoras have also been delivered for use on car park shuttle bus services at airports across the United Kingdom and Ireland. Ten Evoras were delivered to Airport Parking and Hotels in 2023, with six 12.1 m (39 ft 8 in) examples delivered for use at Gatwick Airport and four 11.3 m (37 ft 1 in) examples delivered for use at Manchester Airport. Seventeen Evoras were also delivered to Irish FirstGroup subsidiary Aircoach during 2023 for shuttle service use at Dublin Airport.

=== Singapore ===
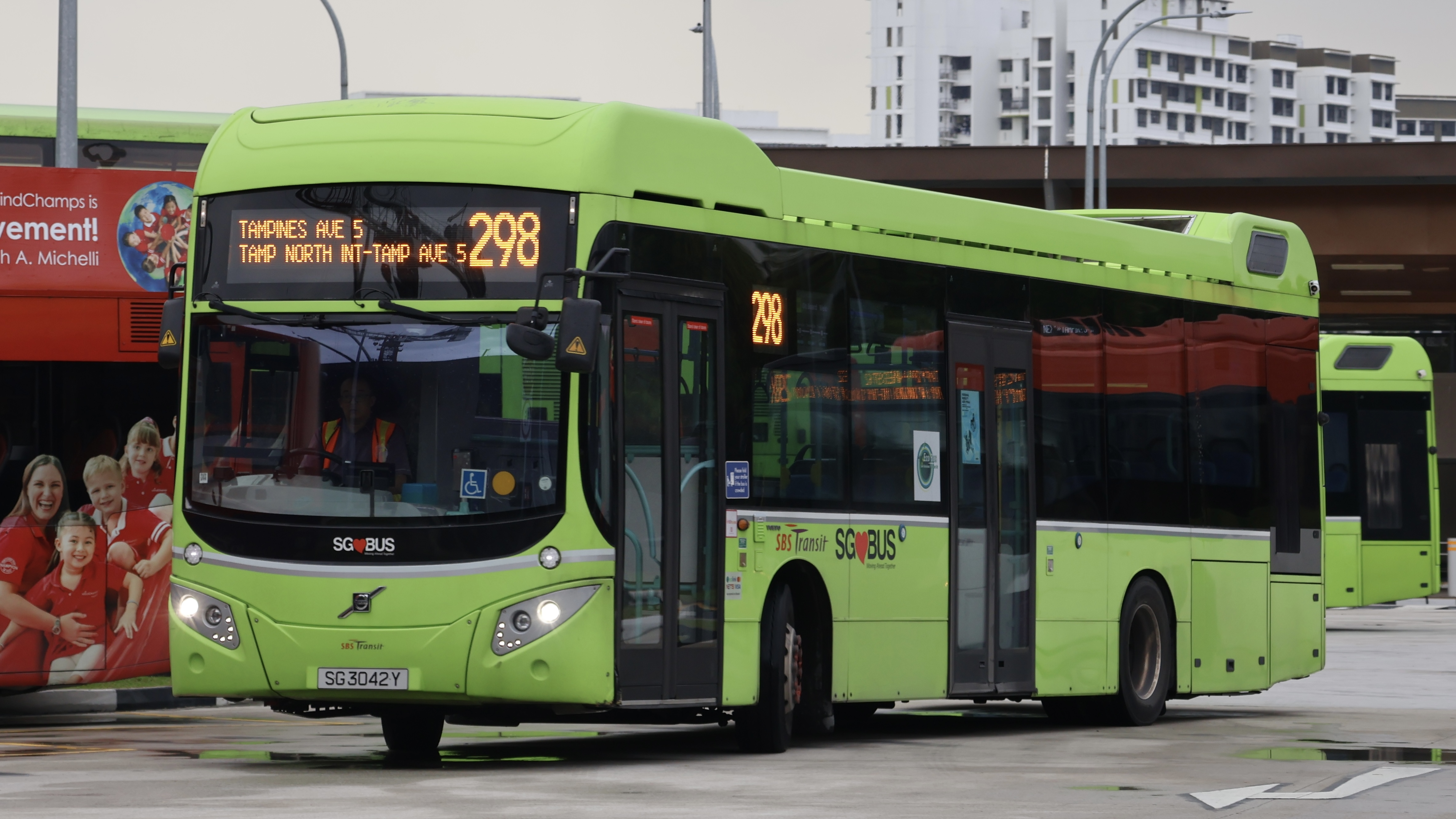
SBS Transit MCV Evora bodied Volvo B5LH hybrid electric bus in Tampines, Singapore in December 2024

In Singapore, the Land Transport Authority purchased 50 MCV Evora-bodied Volvo B5LHs.

== See also ==
- Wright Eclipse 3, the Evora's main competitor for bodywork on Volvo B8RLE chassis
- MCV EvoSeti, the double-decker version of the Evora
