= MCV EvoSeti =

Double-decker bus bodywork on Volvo chassis

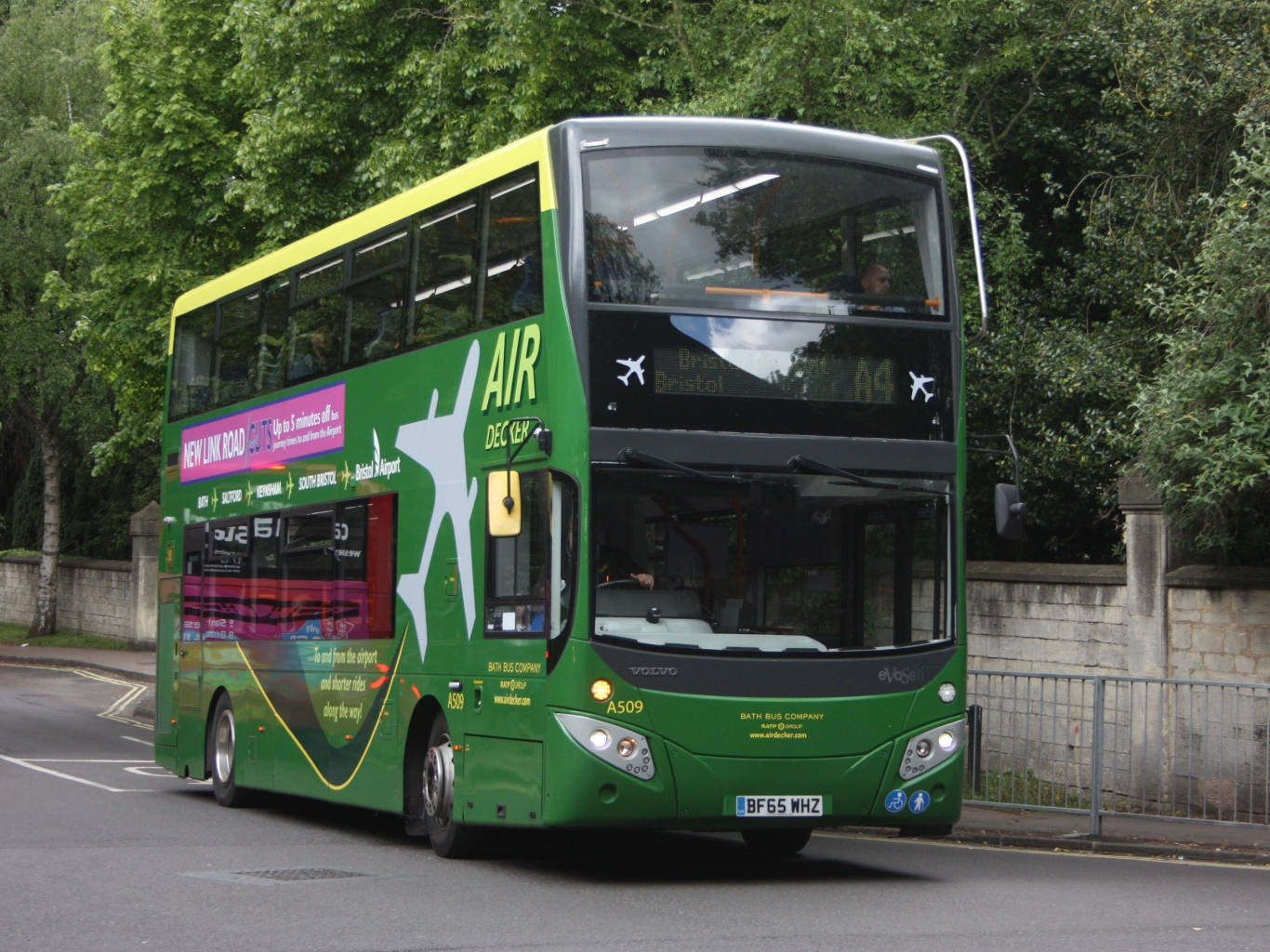
- Bath Bus Company MCV EvoSeti bodied Volvo B5TL in Bath, Somerset in May 2017

Overview
- Manufacturer: MCV
- Production: 2015–present

Body and chassis
- Doors: 1 or 2
- Floor type: Low floor
- Chassis: Volvo B5TL; Volvo B5LH; Volvo B8L
- Related: MCV Evora; MCV D113 EV

Powertrain
- Engine: Volvo D5K (B5LH/B5TL); Volvo D8K (B8L)
- Capacity: B5TL/B5LH; 75-82 seated; B8L; up to 102 seated
- Transmission: ZF EcoLife (B8L/B5TL); Volvo I-Shift (B5LH)

Dimensions
- Length: B5TL/B5LH; 10.5 metres (34 ft 5 in); B8L; 12–12.8 metres (39 ft 4 in – 42 ft 0 in)
- Width: 2.5 metres (8 ft 2 in)
- Height: 4.2–4.3 metres (13 ft 9 in – 14 ft 1 in)

Chronology
- Predecessor: MCV DD103

The MCV EvoSeti (stylised as eVoSeti) is a low-floor double-decker bus body built by MCV Bus & Coach as a replacement for the MCV DD103. It was unveiled in May 2015.

== Design ==
The EvoSeti body is built on the Volvo B5TL and Volvo B5LH 2-axle chassis, as well as the tri-axle Volvo B8L chassis at either 12 metres (39 ft) or 12.8 metres (42 ft). Typically, UK examples have a single passenger door for use outside London, with Transport for London specification EvoSetis equipped with an additional central exit door for London use. The EvoSeti is also able to be specified as a purpose-built open-top bus.

== Operators ==
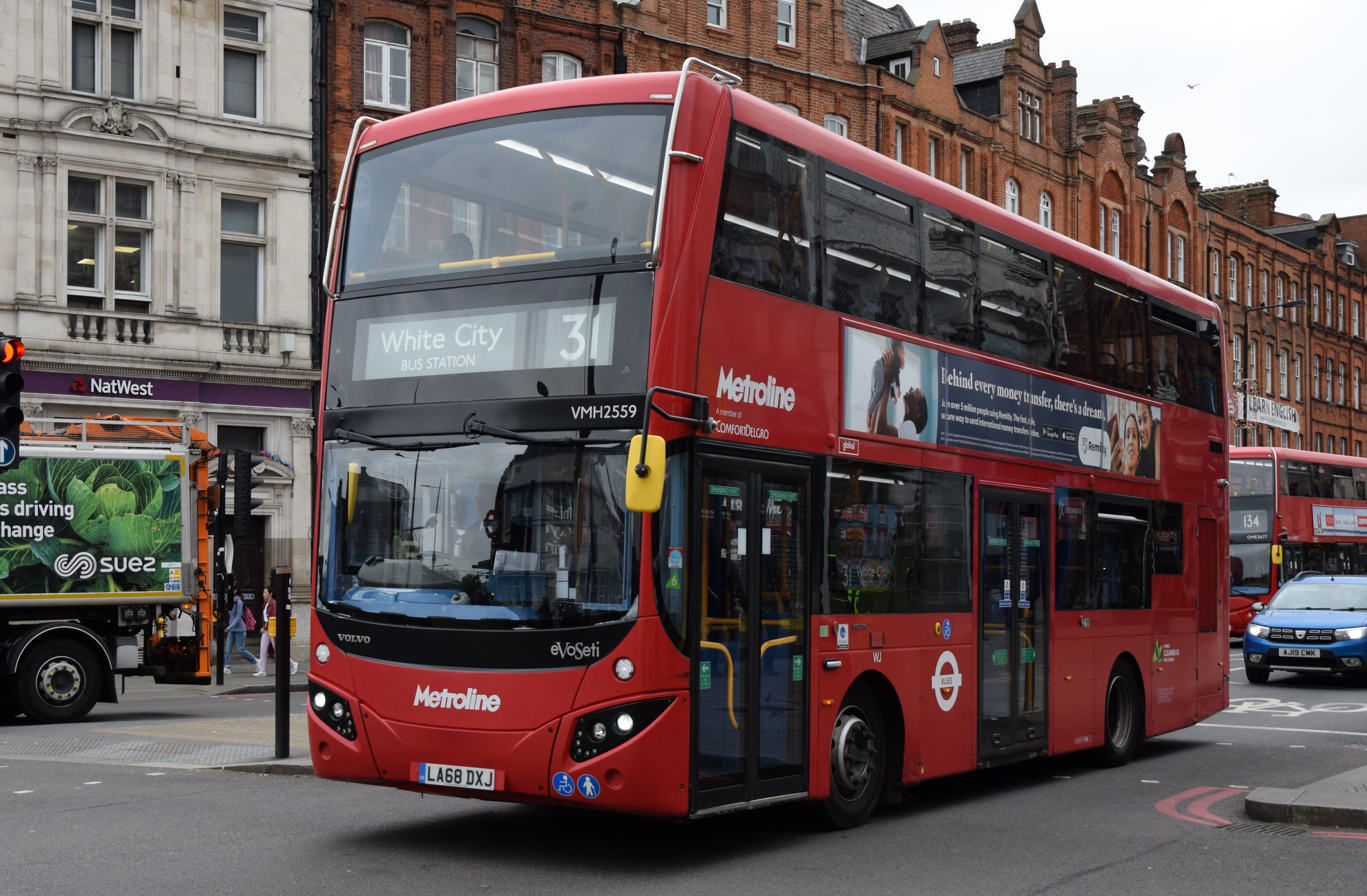
Metroline MCV EvoSeti bodied Volvo B5LH in Camden Town in May 2023

MCV EvoSetis on the hybrid Volvo B5LH chassis proved highly popular in London. Metroline is both the largest operator of the type and of the EvoSeti overall, initially taking delivery of EvoSetis for their takeovers of tenders for routes 30, 113 and 274 between June and July 2018 before commencing repeat orders that took the fleet up to 135 EvoSetis throughout late 2018 and early 2019.

Elsewhere in London, Go-Ahead London took delivery of 99 EvoSeti bodied Volvo B5LH chassis between 2016 and 2017, with the first 20 entering service in April 2016 with London Central on routes 35 and 40, Tower Transit had 51 B5LH EvoSetis delivered in May 2017, and sightseeing company Golden Tours took delivery of 21 open-top B5TL EvoSetis between 2015 and 2016.

East Yorkshire is another large operator of the type; the first production EvoSeti was delivered to the operator on Volvo B5TL chassis. This was followed by a £3.5 million order for 18 more B5TL EvoSetis, which were delivered through 2016 and 2017 for use primarily on long-distance routes to destinations such as York, Bridlington and Withernsea. Additionally, Go South Coast's morebus operation took delivery of three closed-roof and nine open-top EvoSeti bodied B5TLs on their 'Purbeck Breezer' sightseeing service in July 2016.

In October 2016, First South Yorkshire took delivery of a EvoSeti-bodied Volvo B5TL demonstrator on a long-term trial on route X78 between Sheffield and Doncaster. This vehicle was subsequently purchased by Ensignbus after First's trial had ended, later passing to the Bath Bus Company. Four more B5TL EvoSetis were later delivered new to the Bath Bus Company between 2017 and 2020.

=== Tri-axle bodies ===
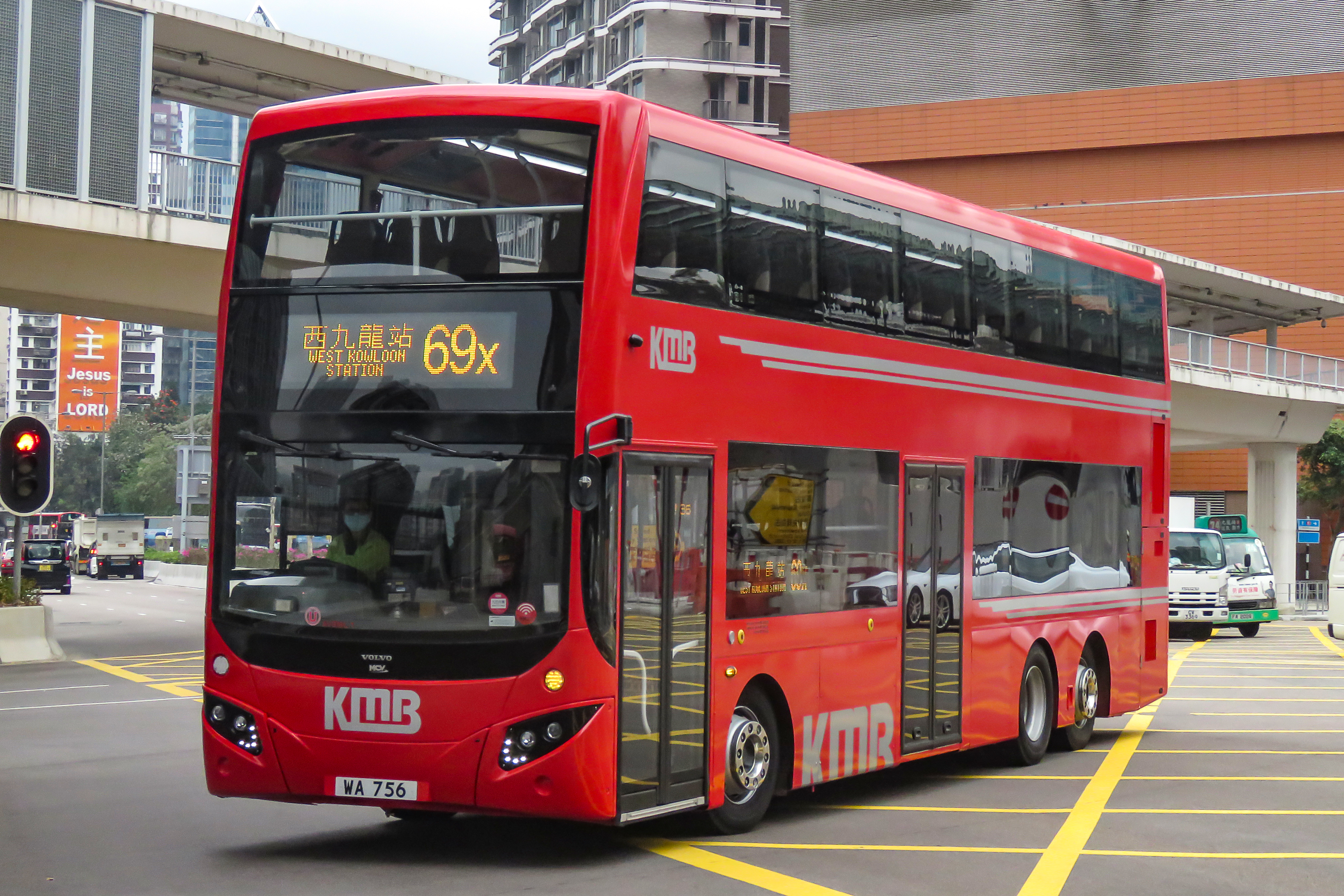
A Kowloon Motor Bus MCV EvoSeti bodied Volvo B8L in Hong Kong

In Hong Kong, Kowloon Motor Bus operate a large fleet of tri-axle EvoSetis on the Volvo B8L chassis, initially taking on two examples for evaluation before a first order for 110 was completed in October 2020.

The EvoSeti-bodied Volvo B8L was later developed for the UK market, retaining Hong Kong-specification air conditioning and seating for high-capacity use on conventional bus services as well as rail replacement and private hire work. The first eight tri-axle EvoSetis in the United Kingdom were delivered to Golden Tours for use on shuttle services to and from the Warner Bros. Studio Tour in early 2020, with further tri-axle EvoSetis delivered to Imperial Coaches, Sanders Coaches, Aldermaston Coach Lines, Archway Travel, Uno of Hatfield, who had five delivered in September 2024 for a capacity uplift on the 'Chilterns Express' service between Hatfield and Luton, and Thames Travel, who had ten delivered in July 2025 for a frequency uplift on the 'River Rapids' service between Oxford and Reading.

In 2024, Kowloon Motor Bus took delivery a batch of brand new Volvo B8Ls built with MCV D123 bodywork, which shares many features with the MCV D113 EV body built Volvo BZL double-deckers for the UK market, as opposed to the usual MCV EvoSeti bodywork.

== See also ==
- MCV Evora, the single-decker version of the EvoSeti
- List of buses
