= El Salheya El Gedida =

El Salheya El Gedida الصالحية الجديدة
- City
- Location in Egypt
- Coordinates: 30.653862°N 31.874371°E
- Country: Egypt
- Governorate: Sharqia

Area
  - Total: 5.864 km^{2} (2.264 sq mi)

Population (2023)
  - Total: 63,459
  - Density: 10,820/km^{2} (28,030/sq mi)
- Time zone: UTC+2 (EET)
  - Summer (DST): UTC+3 (EEST)

El Salheya El Gedida ("New Salheya") is a city in the Sharqia Governorate, Egypt. It was established in 1982, as part of the first generation of the new Egyptian cities.

== Geography ==
=== Climate ===
Köppen climate classification system classifies its climate as hot desert (BWh), as in the rest of Egypt.

Climate data for El Salheya El Gedida
Month	Jan	Feb	Mar	Apr	May	Jun	Jul	Aug	Sep	Oct	Nov	Dec	Year
Mean daily maximum °C (°F)	18.5 (65.3)	19.8 (67.6)	23 (73)	27 (81)	31.2 (88.2)	33.8 (92.8)	34.4 (93.9)	34.4 (93.9)	32.1 (89.8)	29.5 (85.1)	24.9 (76.8)	20.2 (68.4)	27.4 (81.3)
Daily mean °C (°F)	13.1 (55.6)	14.1 (57.4)	16.7 (62.1)	20.1 (68.2)	23.8 (74.8)	26.6 (79.9)	27.8 (82.0)	28 (82)	25.9 (78.6)	23.5 (74.3)	19.6 (67.3)	14.8 (58.6)	21.2 (70.1)
Mean daily minimum °C (°F)	7.7 (45.9)	8.4 (47.1)	10.4 (50.7)	13.2 (55.8)	16.5 (61.7)	19.5 (67.1)	21.3 (70.3)	21.6 (70.9)	19.7 (67.5)	17.6 (63.7)	14.3 (57.7)	9.5 (49.1)	15.0 (59.0)
Average precipitation mm (inches)	9 (0.4)	6 (0.2)	6 (0.2)	2 (0.1)	1 (0.0)	0 (0)	0 (0)	0 (0)	0 (0)	3 (0.1)	7 (0.3)	6 (0.2)	40 (1.5)
Source: Climate-Data.org (altitude: 27m)
