= Volvo B5TL =

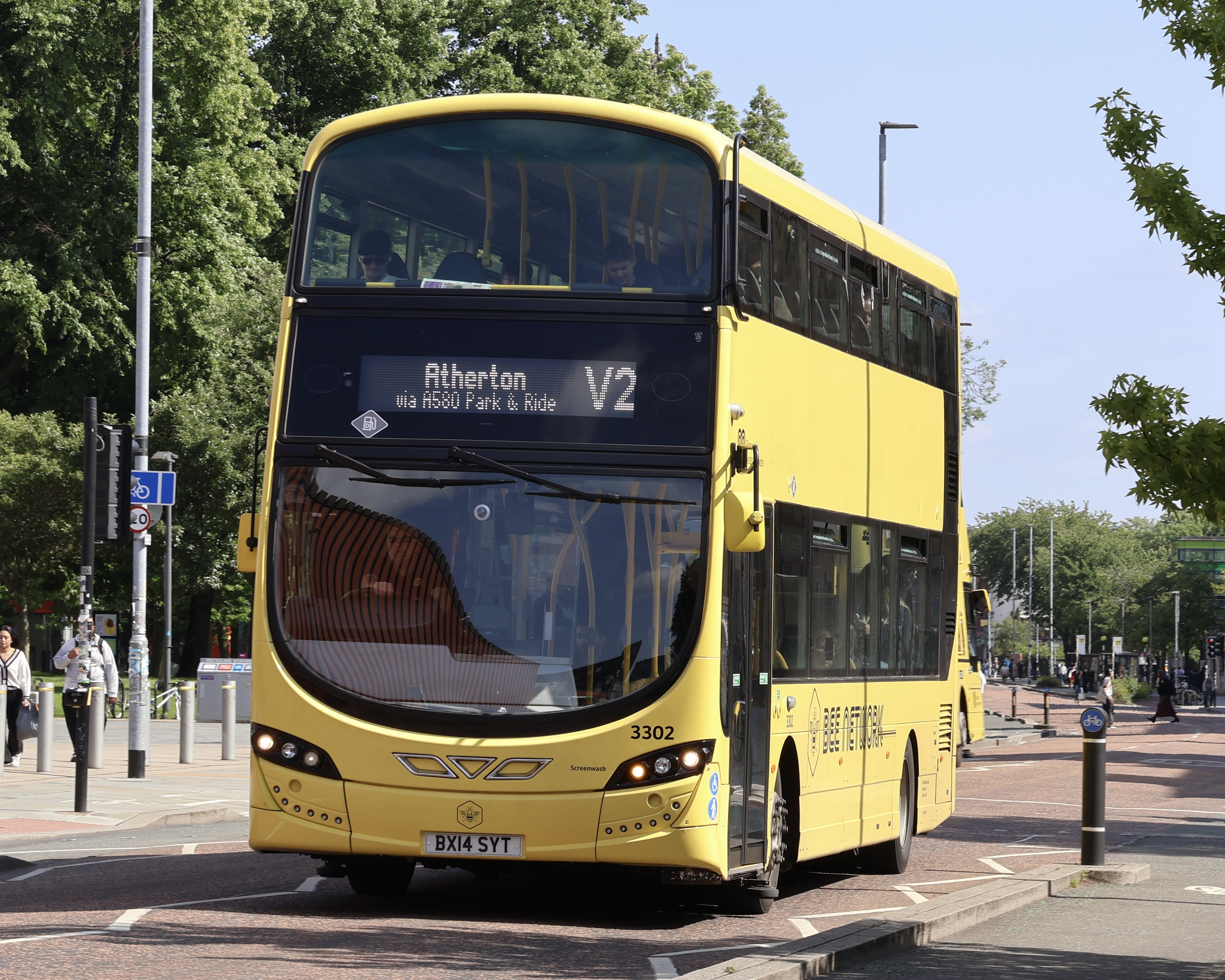
- Go North West Wright Eclipse Gemini 3 bodied B5TL in University of Manchester in June 2025

Overview
- Manufacturer: Volvo
- Production: 2013-2021

Body and chassis
- Doors: 1 or 2 door
- Floor type: Low floor
- Related: Volvo B8L, Volvo B5LH

Powertrain
- Engine: Volvo D5K-240 5.1 litre diesel
- Power output: 240 hp (180 kW)
- Transmission: ZF EcoLife Type 6AP1003B

Dimensions
- Length: 10.5 m (34 ft 5 in) or 11.2 m (36 ft 9 in)
- Width: 2.55 m (8 ft 4 in)

Chronology
- Predecessor: Volvo B9TL (2-axle)

The Volvo B5TL is a 2-axle low-floor double decker bus chassis built by Volvo. It replaced the B9TL as Volvo's Euro 6 2-axle double decker product for the UK and Irish markets.

== Design ==
The B5TL is powered by Volvo's new 4-cylinder, 5.1 litre D5K-240 engine, which is rated at 240 bhp/177 kW. The move to a smaller engine is one of the weight-reduction measures implemented to the new bus. Along with its bodybuilding partner Wrightbus, the whole bus achieves a reduction of 1,000 kg comparing to its predecessor. Volvo stated that, with the smaller engine and weight reduction, the B5TL will achieve 10% improvement on fuel economy.

Wrightbus offered the lightened Gemini 3 bodywork for the B5TL, which contributes 70% of the weight reduction. MCV is also offering their body as an alternative to the Wrightbus design, while Alexander Dennis have exclusively built 98 examples of their Enviro400 MMC body on the Volvo B5TL chassis for Lothian Buses.

== History ==
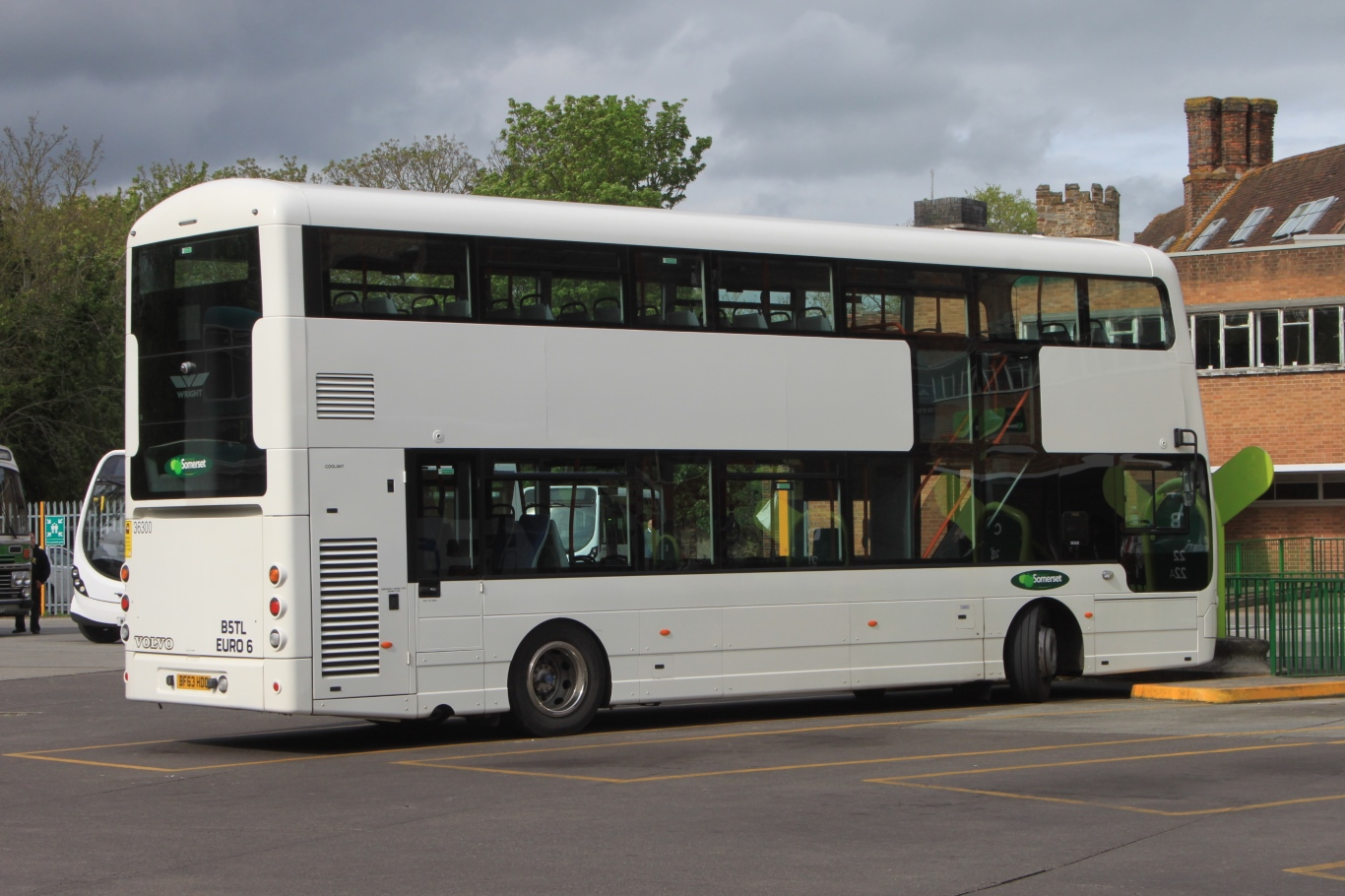
Rear view

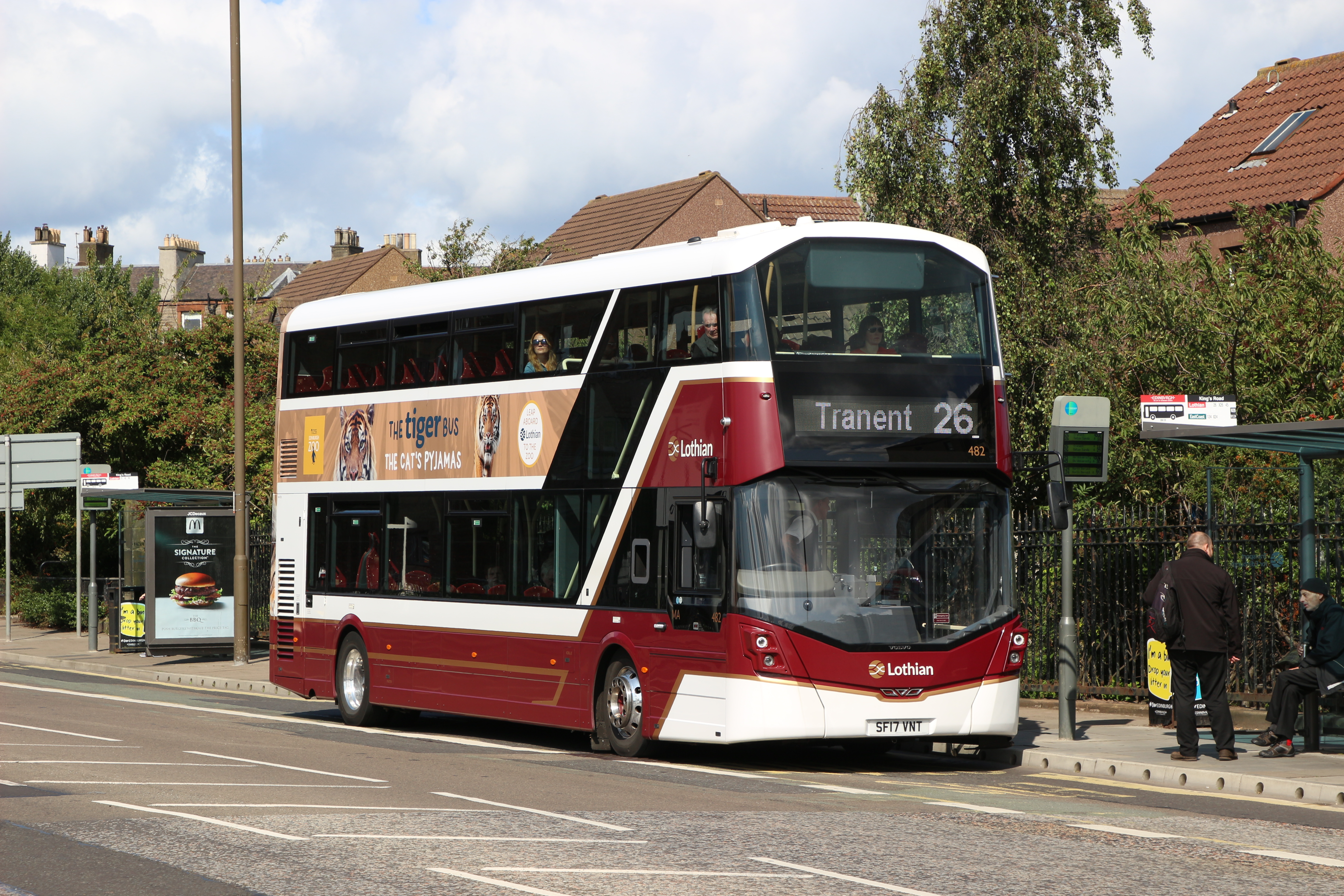
A B5TL with the facelift Wright Gemini 3 bodywork

The first example appeared in London in autumn 2013, entering service with Go-Ahead London in October 2013 for evaluation. It remained until late February 2014 before being returned to Volvo. This bus was also used by Stagecoach London on other routes.

Four further B5TL demonstrators have appeared in early 2014. One was trialed by Lothian Buses, before moving to Go North East. Another was trialled by operators such as Transdev on service 36. Both of these have now been purchased by East Yorkshire and operate on the company's 66 route between Hessle and Hull. The other two were delivered to London General and Metroline and placed in service on routes 12 and 297 respectively.

In March 2014, Translink of Northern Ireland, placed an order for 42 buses with the new Wright Gemini 3 bodywork, with the last of them carrying the further redesigned version. In May 2014, Lothian Buses had ordered for 25 buses, all of them were Wright Gemini 3 bodied. Translink placed a second order in 2017 for 32 B5TLs, 10 of which being long wheelbase models for use on its Airport 300 service, with the remainder for use in Belfast. All of these have the new style front.

Outside the UK, a B5TL demonstrator was delivered to Dublin Bus in early 2014 for evaluation. A batch of 70 (SG-class) were subsequently ordered by Dublin Bus with deliveries commencing in August 2014. In 2015 Bus Éireann took delivery of 25 B5TLs, while Dublin Bus ordered a further 90 examples. Dublin Bus have continued to place orders, and by the end of 2017 it had a total of 370 in service. Further orders were placed for 2018-2019 deliveries, building up to a total of 546 in service by December 2019. There are also 72 in service with Go-Ahead Ireland, some of which were transferred from Dublin Bus and others delivered brand new to Go-Ahead. By the end of 2017, Bus Éireann had a total of 85 B5TLs in service across Ireland, operating in Dublin, Cork, Limerick, Waterford, Drogheda, Dundalk and Galway.

Volvo Buses removed product information on B5TL from their British website in mid-2021.
