= Wright Eclipse Gemini =

Low-floor double-decker bus body

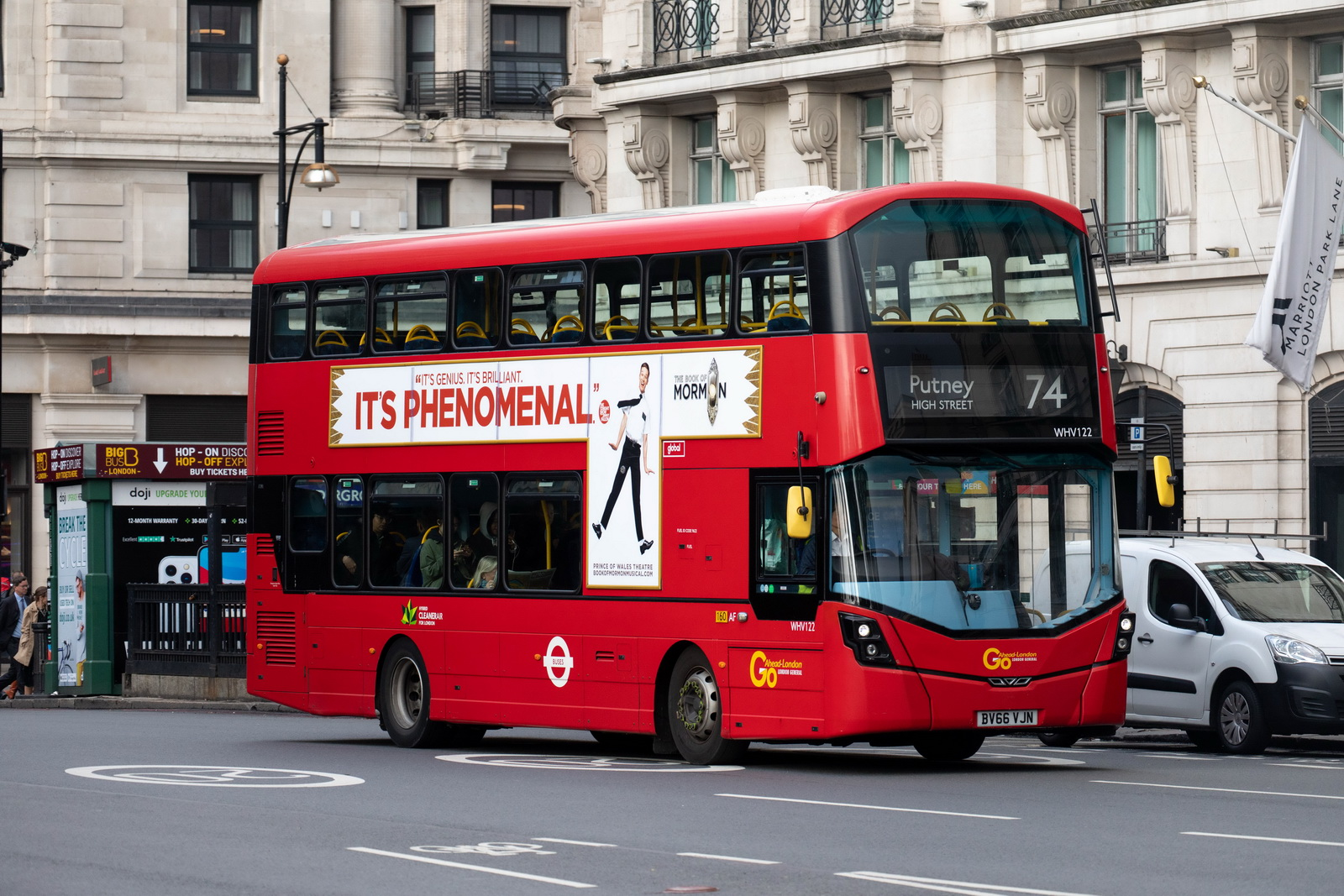
- London General Wright Gemini 3 bodied Volvo B5LH at Marble Arch in September 2022

Overview
- Manufacturer: Wrightbus
- Production: 2001–2021
- Assembly: Ballymena, Northern Ireland

Body and chassis
- Doors: 1-2
- Floor type: Low floor
- Chassis: Volvo B8L; Volvo B5TL; Volvo B5LH; Volvo B9TL; Volvo B7TL; Volvo Super Olympian (Explorer); Scania K410EB
- Related: Wright Eclipse; Wright Pulsar Gemini; Wright StreetDeck (Chassis)

Powertrain
- Engine: Volvo D8K (Volvo B8L); Volvo D5K (Volvo B5TL); Volvo D5E/D5F/D5K (Volvo B5LH); Volvo D9A/D9B (Volvo B9TL); Volvo D7C (Volvo B7TL); Volvo D10A (Volvo Super Olympian); Scania DC13 (Scania K410)
- Transmission: Volvo I-Shift; Voith DIWA; ZF Ecomat; ZF EcoLife

Dimensions
- Length: 2-axle 10.0 m (32 ft 10 in) to 11.5 m (37 ft 9 in) 3-axle 11.3 m (37 ft 1 in); 12.0 m (39 ft 4 in); 12.8 m (42 ft 0 in)
- Width: 2.52 m (8 ft 3 in)
- Height: 4.23 m (13 ft 11 in) or 4.4 m (14 ft 5 in)

The Wright Eclipse Gemini is a low-floor double-decker bus body that was built by Wrightbus from 2001 to 2021, based on the single-decker Wright Eclipse design. The second-generation Eclipse Gemini 2 was launched in 2009, followed by the third-generation Gemini 3 in 2013. Additionally, the body was available on Volvo Super Olympian chassis in Hong Kong between 2003 and 2005, marketed as the Wright Explorer.

The original Eclipse Gemini was launched in 2001 on Volvo B7TL chassis; from 2006, the body was also built on the replacement Volvo B9TL chassis and, from 2013, on the B9TL's replacement, the Volvo B5TL. From 2008, the body was also available on Volvo B5LH hybrid chassis. Eclipse Gemini's exported to the Asian market have been offered a choice of the tri-axle Volvo B8L and the Scania K410EB.

Wright Eclipse Gemini bodied buses were mass-introduced on London Buses services from 2001. It has also been popular with FirstGroup, who from 2003 onwards have purchased over 1,200 into service. Dublin Bus and Bus Éireann have also acquired many Volvo B9TLs with Wright Eclipse Gemini bodywork.

== First generation (2001–2009) ==
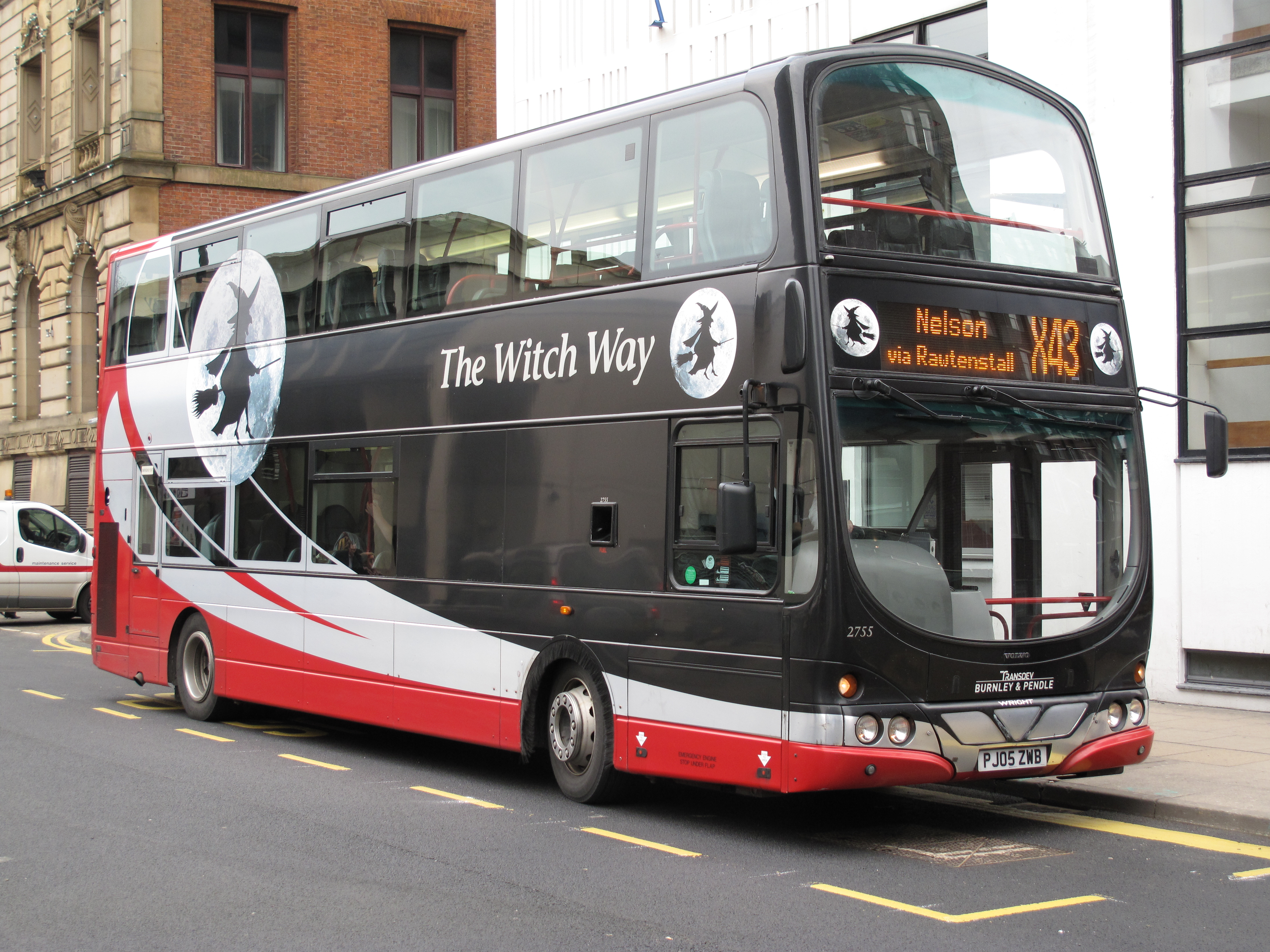
Transdev in Burnley & Pendle Volvo B7TL with first generation Wright Eclipse Gemini body

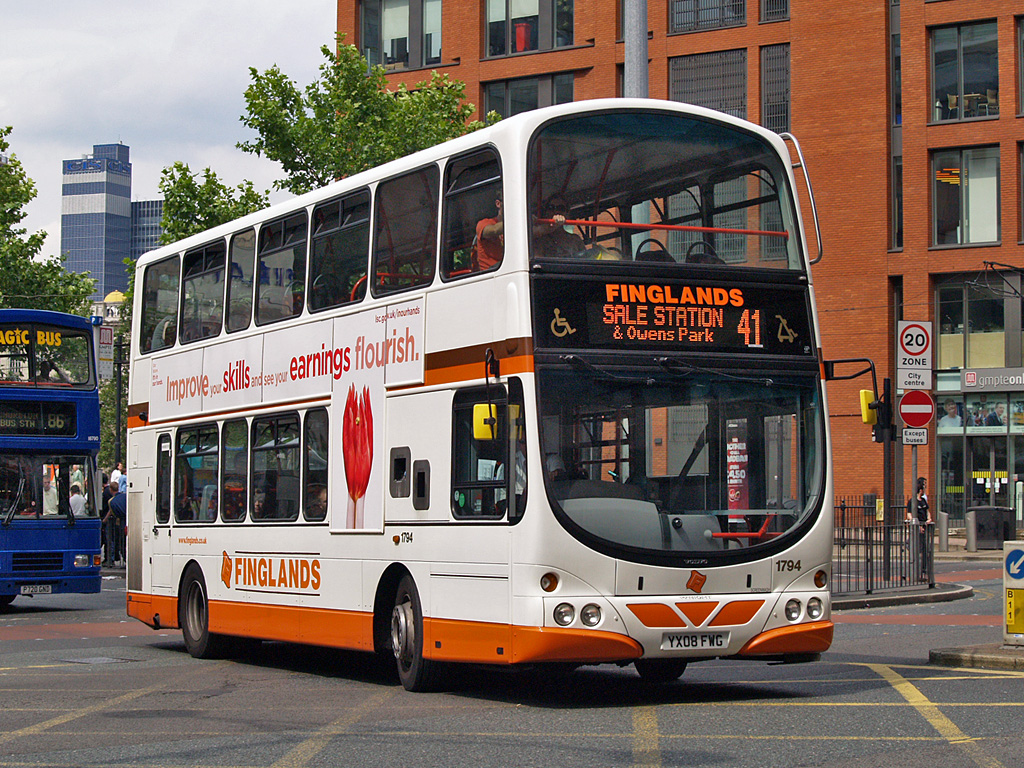
Finglands Coachways Volvo B9TL with first generation Wright Eclipse Gemini body

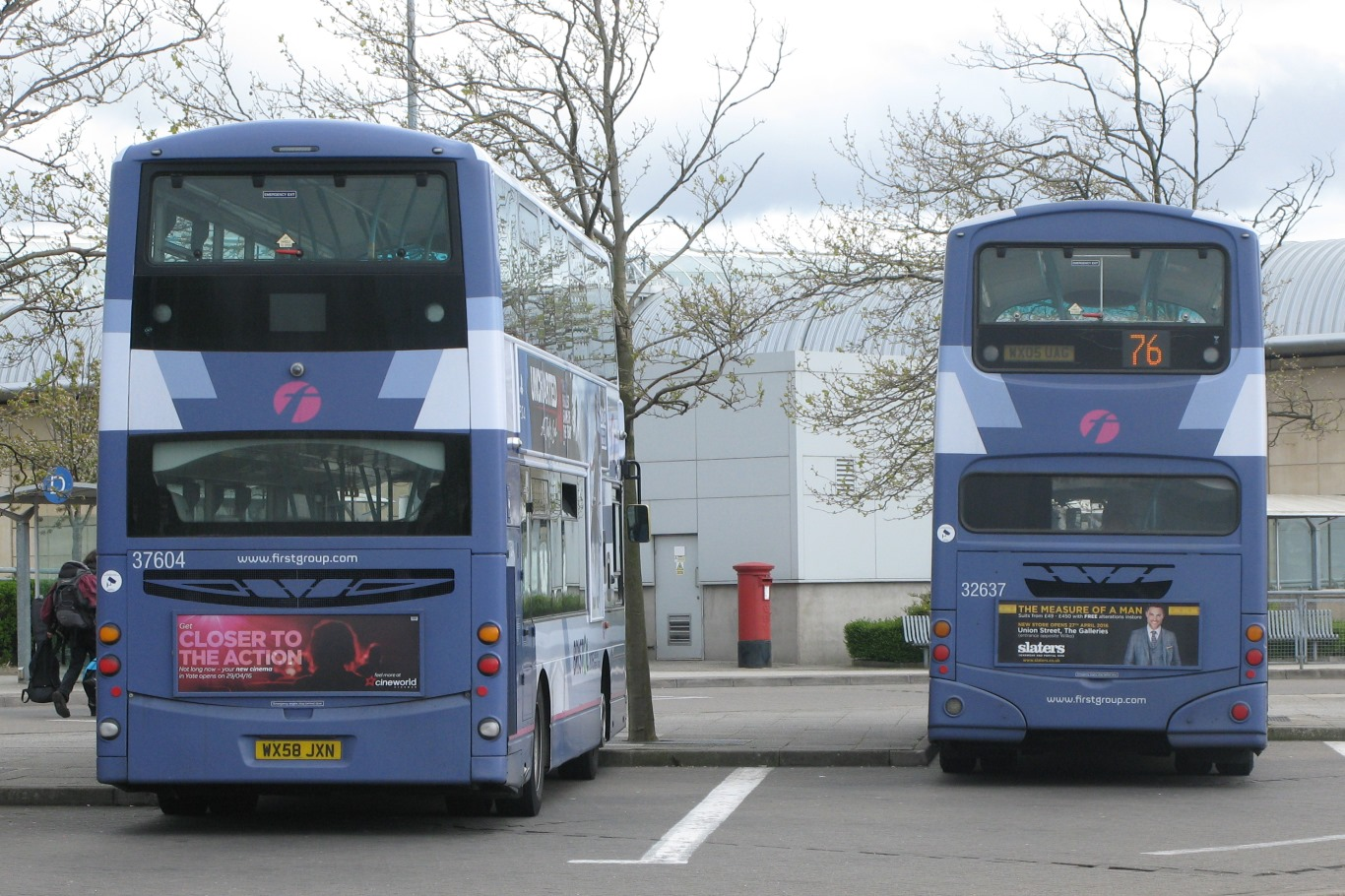
Rears of First Bristol Volvo B7TL (right) and facelifted Volvo B9TL (left) Wright Eclipse Geminis at Cribbs Causeway bus station

The Wright Eclipse Gemini was launched in 2001, initially on the Volvo B7TL chassis, as a double decker version of the existing Wright Eclipse body. The original Eclipse Gemini, and all versions up until the facelifted Gemini 3, have both the upper and lower deck front windscreens forming part of a single oval shape, with the destination blind in between. The interior of the Eclipse Gemini features curves similar to its exterior, and continues the modern feel.

In 2006, the Volvo B7TL chassis, which had been the subject of noise complaints, was superseded by the Volvo B9TL, with Wrightbus launching a facelifted version of the Wright Eclipse Gemini to fit the new chassis. The updated styling was largely confined to the rear of the body, where it has a more rounded appearance compared to the original and a central LED route number panel, housed within a smoked glass effect panel underneath the upper rear window. Other external modifications included the relocation of the rear number plate from its integrated position with the upper rear window to a more conventional siting at the bottom of the bus.

The first-generation Wright Eclipse Gemini was highly popular with the FirstGroup, with the group ordering examples from 2004 onwards. Wright Eclipse Geminis on the Volvo B7TL chassis entered service with First Glasgow, First West and South Yorkshire, and First Leicester, among others, between 2004 and the B7TL's discontinuation in 2007. The first examples on the following Volvo B9TL chassis entered service with First South Yorkshire and First Glasgow in 2007, subsequently followed by a large order from First Greater Manchester, who ordered over 200 of the type from 2007 to 2010.

In London, the Wright Eclipse Gemini on the Volvo B7TL chassis was also highly popular with Transport for London operators, although these buses were the subject of criticism for noise from their cooling fans. Arriva London were the launch customer for the Wright Eclipse Gemini, taking on its first two of the type in July 2001, one of which was displayed at the 2001 International Association of Public Transport conference at the Earls Court Exhibition Centre. Arriva London would go on to operate a total 179 Wright Eclipse Geminis on the Volvo B7TL chassis, while 273 B7TL Geminis were delivered to Go-Ahead London Central and London General, 209 to First Capital, 73 to Travel London, 44 to East Thames Buses and three delivered to London United. A single Euro IV Volvo B9TL demonstrator with Wright Eclipse Gemini bodywork was delivered to London Central in July 2006, however orders did not materialise.

Lothian Buses were another popular customer of the Wright Eclipse Gemini, initially ordering 125 on the Volvo B7TL chassis between 2005 and 2006, having previously standardised with the Plaxton President on the Dennis Trident chassis. The company moved onto the Volvo B9TL chassis in 2007, taking on a first batch of 50 that year. The Wright Eclipse Gemini on the Volvo B7TL chassis was similarly popular with Travel West Midlands, taking delivery of 150 of the type between 2004 and 2006, as well as Translink of Northern Ireland, who took delivery of 125 Geminis on Volvo B9TL chassis during 2007 for use by both its Metro and Ulsterbus companies.

Go North East initially took delivery of three Wright Eclipse Geminis with high specification interiors on the Volvo B7TL chassis in 2005, which were used on the X10 express service connecting Newcastle upon Tyne and Middlesbrough; this was followed in 2006 by an order for five B7TL Geminis for use on the 724 service connecting Newcastle and Chester-le-Street. East Yorkshire Motor Services purchased a total of 60 Wright Eclipse Geminis on both the Volvo B7TL and B9TL chassis between 2005 and 2009, including four for its Manchester-based Finglands Coachways operation, and Lincolnshire RoadCar took delivery of six Wright Eclipse Geminis on Volvo B7TL chassis for Lincolnshire InterConnect services in 2006, its last new buses ordered before RoadCar's parent, the Traction Group, was sold to the Stagecoach Group.

The Blazefield Group first ordered Wright Eclipse Geminis in 2003, ordering twelve Volvo B7TLs with high-specification interiors for use on The 36, serving Ripon, Harrogate and Leeds. This was followed by a delivery of 16 Geminis on B7TL chassis in 2005 for use on The Witch Way, serving Burnley and Manchester. Ten Wright Eclipse Geminis on Volvo B9TL chassis were later delivered to Yorkshire Coastliner in 2008.

Smaller operators of Wright Eclipse Geminis included Yellow Buses, who took delivery of six B7TL Wright Eclipse Geminis, and Wessex Bus, who took delivery of seven B9TL Geminis during 2007.

The Wright Eclipse Gemini was also made available on the hybrid Volvo B5LH chassis in 2008. The first six hybrid Eclipse Geminis were delivered to Arriva London in 2009.

=== Wright Explorer ===
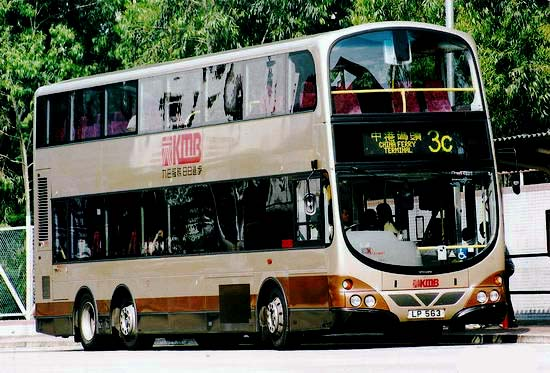
Kowloon Motor Bus Wright Explorer bodied Volvo Super Olympian

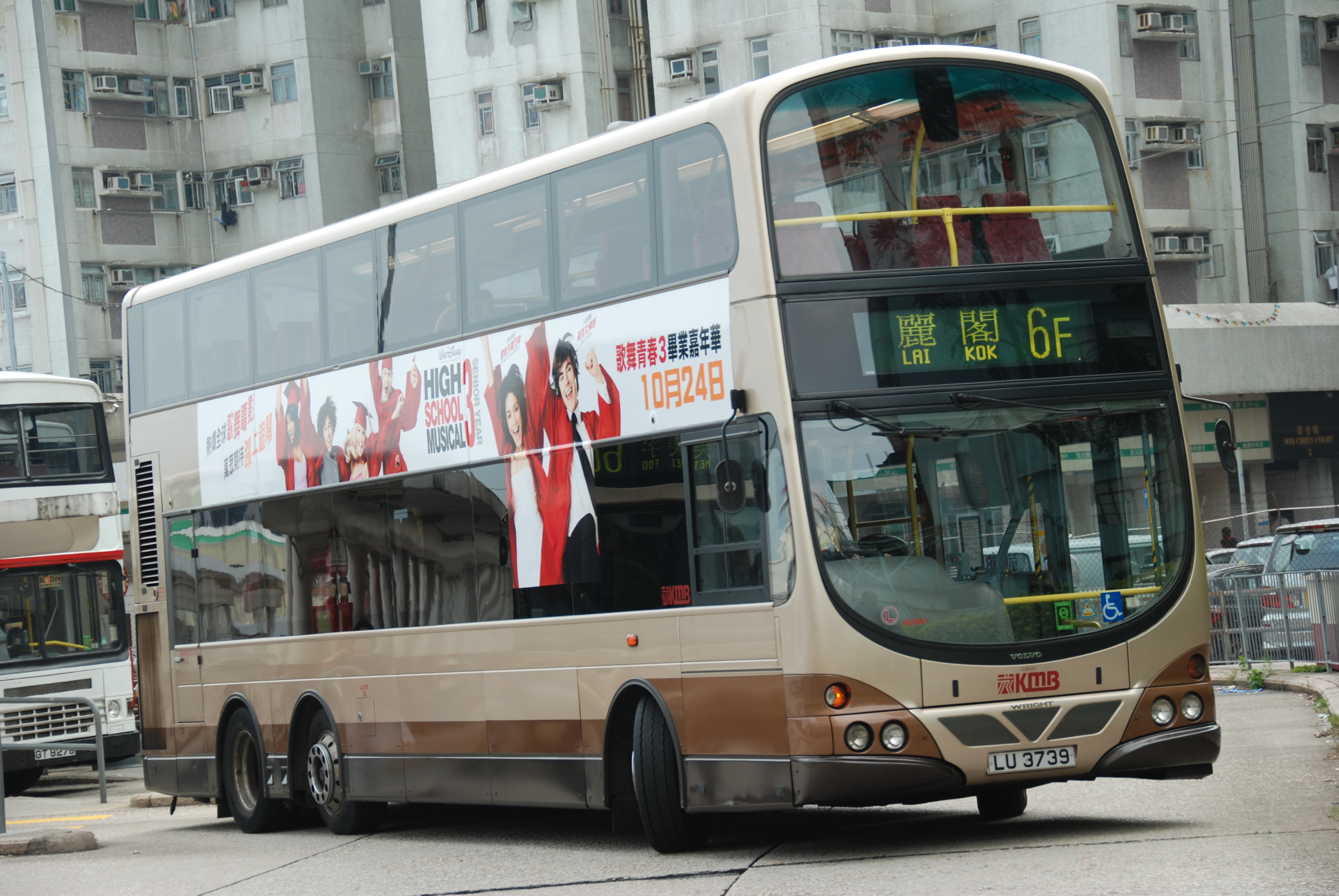
Kowloon Motor Bus Wright bodied Volvo B9TL

Between 2003 and 2005, Wrightbus bodied 100 Volvo Super Olympian chassis for Kowloon Motor Bus in Hong Kong; these received a modified version of the Eclipse Gemini body, initially marketed as The Wright Bus but later being renamed the Wright Explorer. The bodywork was modified to fit the Super Olympian chassis, with the most noticeable difference being the tri-axle layout. The last Volvo Super Olympian to roll off the production line received Wright Explorer bodywork.

Subsequently, the Super Olympian was replaced by a tri-axle variant of the Volvo B9TL. Wrightbus offered similar tri-axle bodywork, which was unnamed and had slightly different rear styling, to the chassis. Deliveries commenced in 2006 with an initial batch of 64 Wright-bodied B9TLs. After the introduction of Euro IV-engined Volvo B9TL, this bodywork became known as the Eclipse Gemini tri-axle, but no bodywork carrying this name were known to have been built.

== Second generation (2008–2018) ==
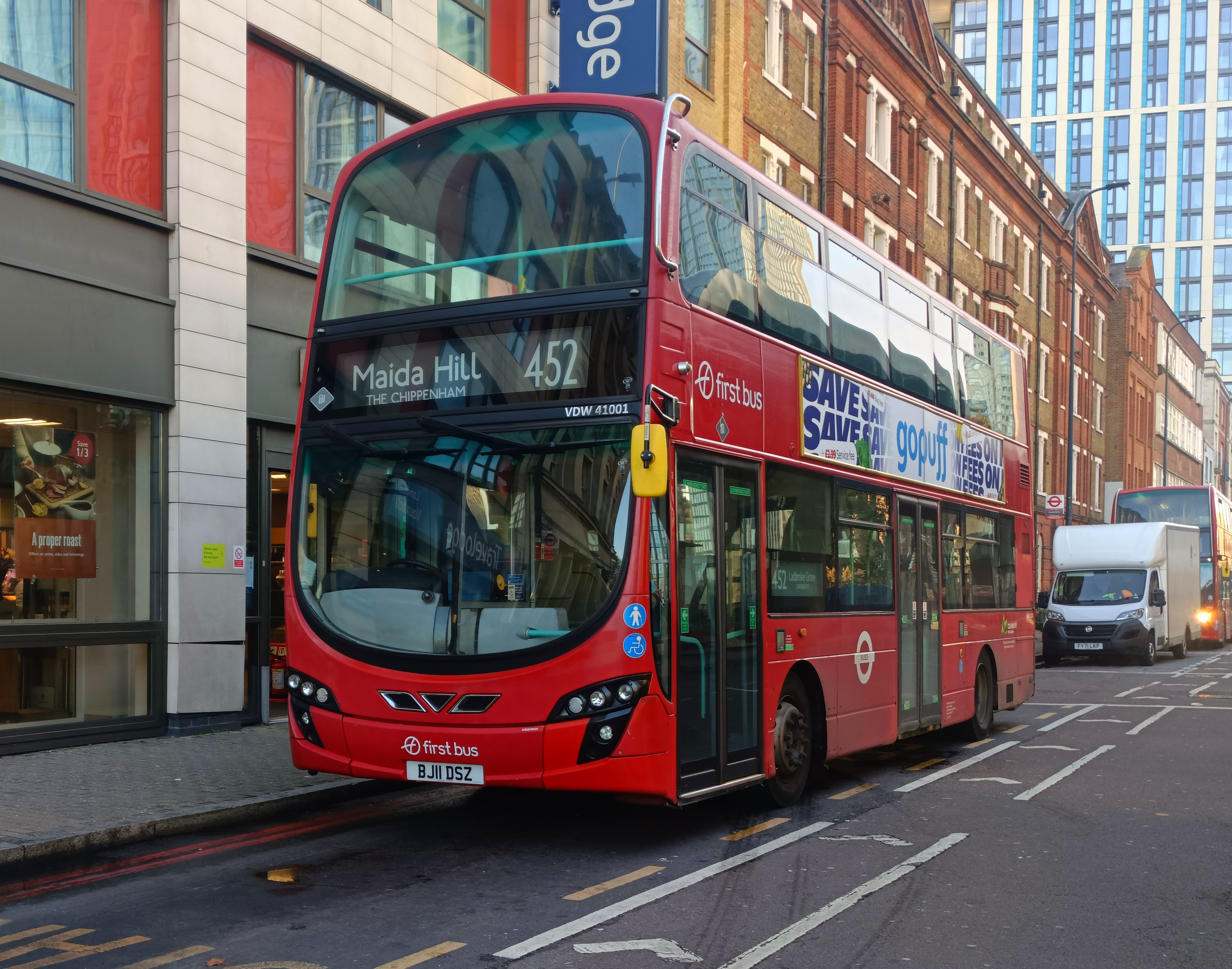
First Bus London Volvo B9TL with standard-roof version of the Wright Eclipse Gemini 2 body in October 2025

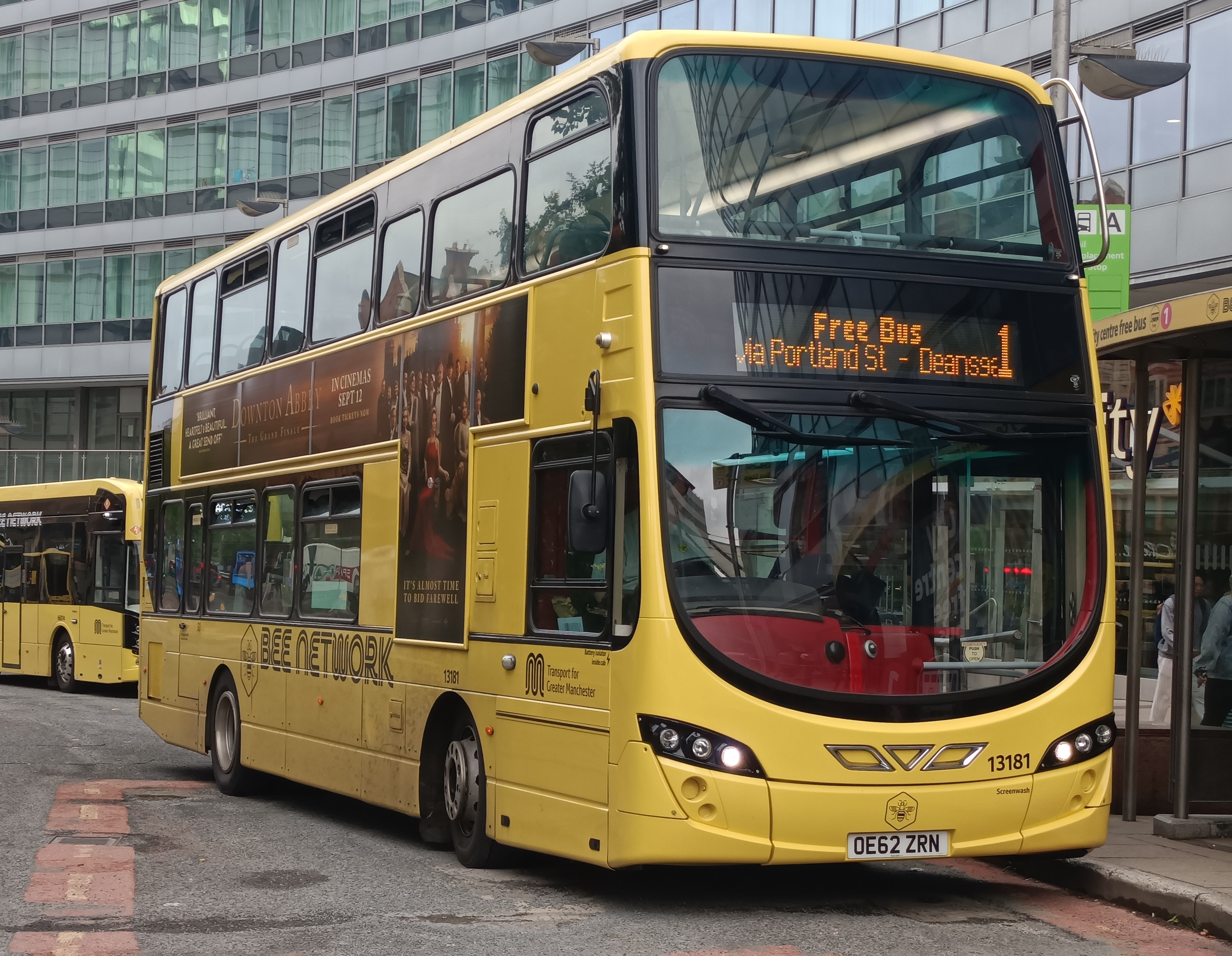
Stagecoach Manchester Volvo B5LH with low-roof version of the Wright Eclipse Gemini 2 body in September 2025

The second generation Wright Eclipse Gemini, called the Eclipse Gemini 2, was launched in 2008 on Volvo B9TL and B5LH chassis. The Eclipse Gemini 2 features front and rear ends facelifted to match the Eclipse 2 single-decker, as part of Wrightbus' new design philosophy. A low-roof version was introduced in 2012.

After having been a significant customer for Wright Eclipse Geminis, outside London, the FirstGroup ordered comparatively fewer Wright Eclipse Gemini 2s on the Volvo B9TL chassis. First West Yorkshire took the largest delivery of Gemini 2s in the group, with 47 delivered to the operator in 2012 following their use in London on shuttle services for the 2012 Summer Olympics. Six were also delivered across two batches for First Berkshire's Green Line service 702 between 2011 and 2013, while First Eastern Counties took delivery of 15 Gemini 2s for services in Norwich in 2012.

Lothian Buses was a continuing customer for the Gemini body on Volvo B9TL chassis, purchasing 145 Gemini 2s from 2009 to 2011. 14 of these were delivered in 2010 for Lothian's Airlink services, specified with luggage racks, free WiFi, tables and a route-branded livery.

East Yorkshire Motor Services took delivery of twenty Gemini 2s in two batches in 2009. Six more were delivered to the company in 2014, followed by three acquired from Volvo dealer stock in 2015.

Delaine Buses took delivery of seven Wright Gemini 2s on Volvo B9TL chassis between 2011 and 2015, with Delaine's final example also being the last Volvo B9TL chassis and Wright Gemini 2 body built for the UK market. Dublin Bus purchased 160 during 2012 and 2013.

The Volvo B5LH with Wright Eclipse Gemini 2 bodywork was popular with Arriva UK Bus, with 77 examples delivered to group subsidiaries between 2012 and 2013. 44 were delivered to Arriva North West, 33 of which were for use in Merseyside and the remaining eleven delivered for use in Manchester, 12 were delivered to Arriva Yorkshire, eleven were delivered to Arriva Southern Counties and ten were delivered to Arriva North East.

Elsewhere, operators of Volvo B5LHs with Wright Eclipse Gemini 2 bodywork include the Oxford Bus Company, who had nineteen low-roof examples delivered in 2013, and National Express West Midlands, who had eighteen in two batches delivered between 2011 and 2013. 22 were delivered to First West Yorkshire in 2011 for use on the Leeds guided busway, while 14 were delivered to First Greater Manchester, where four were also purchased that year by Bullocks Coaches for use on shuttle services along Oxford Road to the University of Manchester. Smaller operators include Brighton & Hove, who had eleven delivered in 2012, Preston Bus, who had eight delivered in 2013, and Ensignbus, who had five delivered in 2012.

=== Exports ===
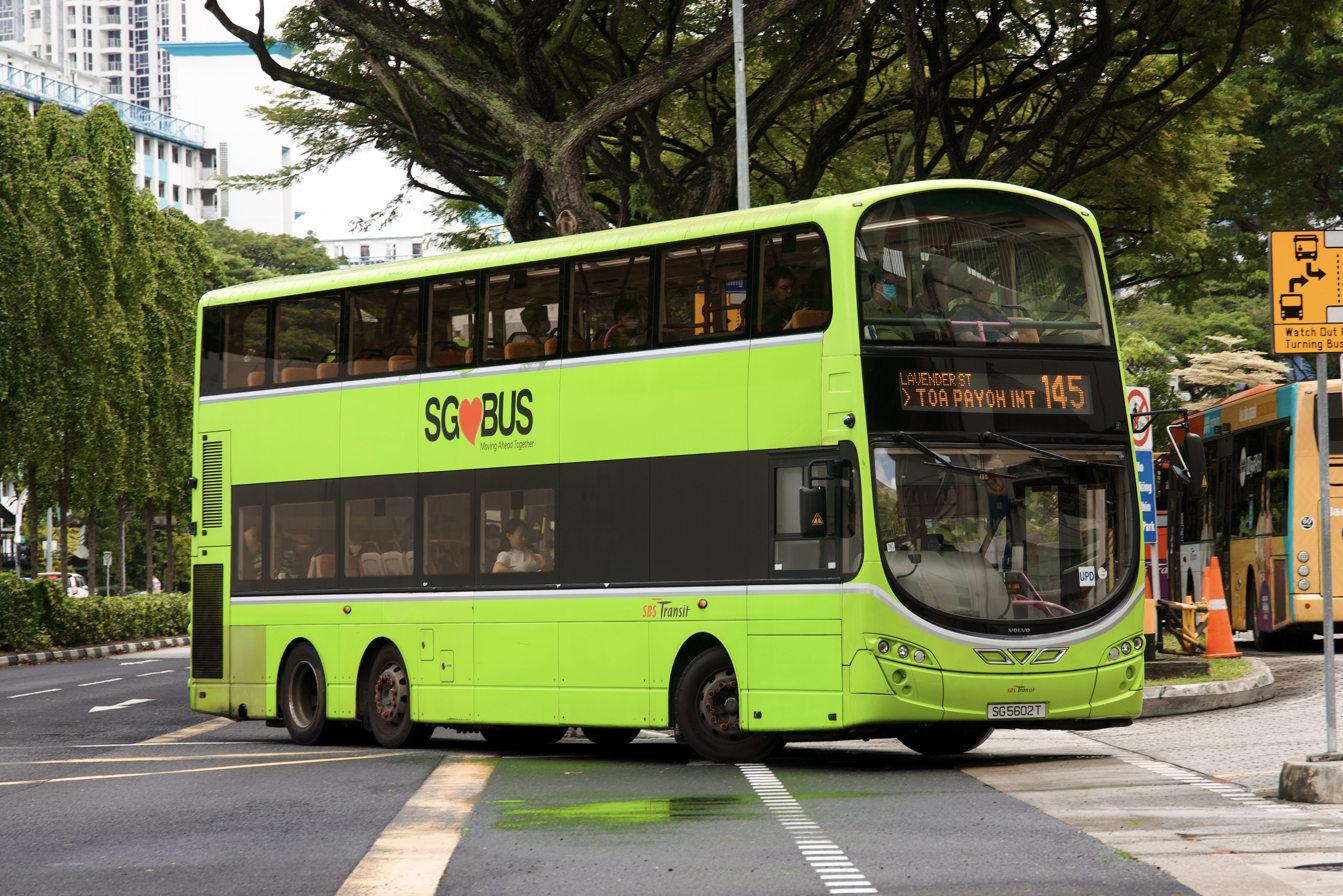
SBS Transit Volvo B9TL Wright Eclipse Gemini 2

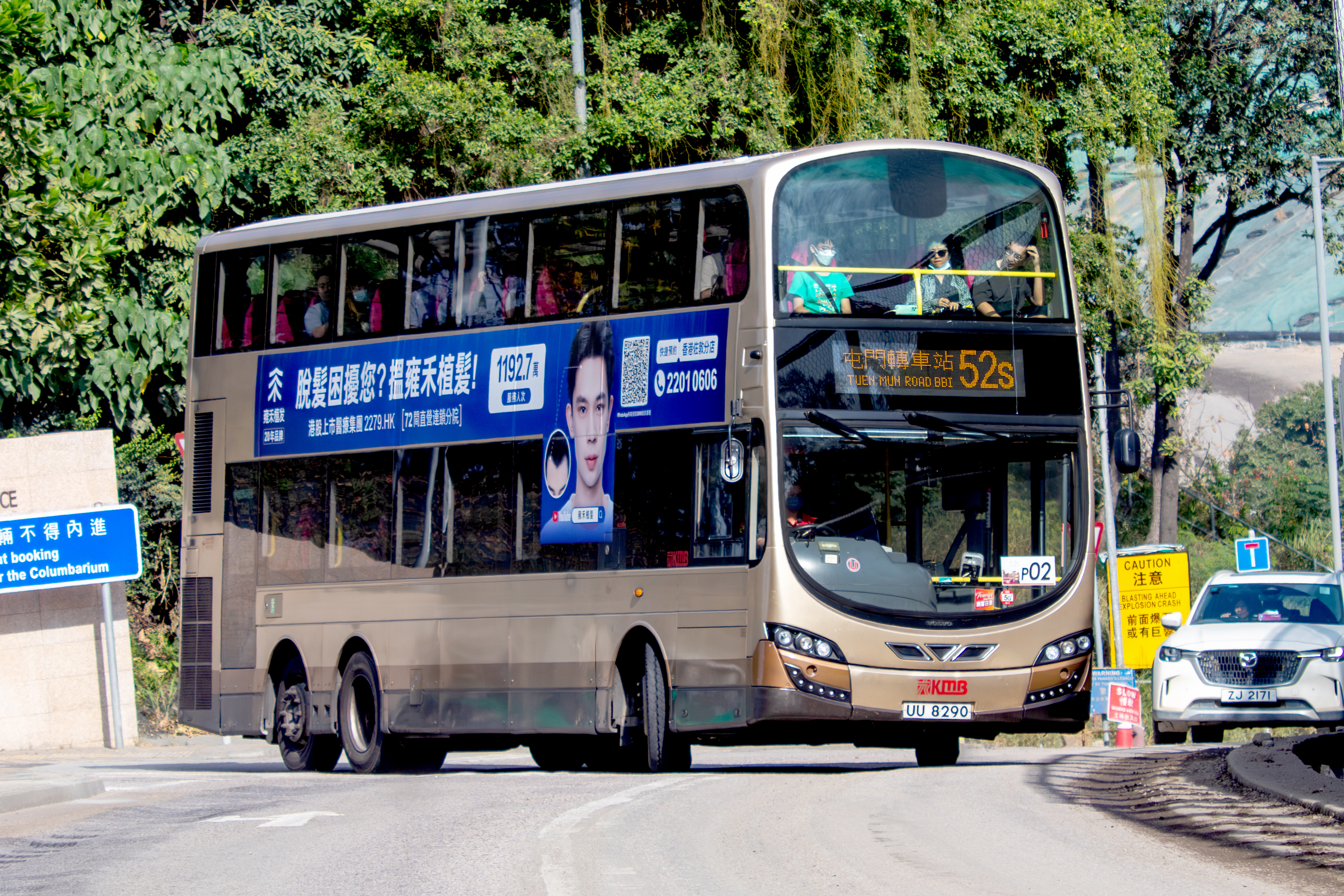
KMB Volvo B8L prototype with Wright Eclipse Gemini 2 bodywork

Like the Explorer, the Eclipse Gemini 2 was sold in Hong Kong, including a tri-axle variant that replaced the Explorer. Citybus, Kowloon Motor Bus, MTR Bus and New World First Bus purchasing examples. In 2013, Kowloon Motor Bus purchased two extended 12.8 metre long demonstrators. and was delivered in mid-2014. Citybus took an example of the 12.8 metres long as well and was delivered in late-2013, with build quality issues delaying the registration process and eventually put into service in March 2015. In 2017, the first demonstrator Volvo B8L for Kowloon Motor Bus was fitted with an Eclipse Gemini 2 body.

Between 2010 and 2017, SBS Transit and Land Transport Authority took delivery of 1,606 Eclipse Gemini 2 for Volvo B9TLs being delivered as complete knock-down kits (CKD) and locally assembled by ComfortDelGro Engineering (CDGE) at Hougang Bus Depot (HGDEP). They are operated by all public transport operators in Singapore (SBS Transit, SMRT Buses, Tower Transit and Go-Ahead Singapore). Most common bus model in Singapore, Likely the KMB Explorer-bodied Volvo Super Olympian B10TL units, based on the exterior design of these buses and technical specifications of this batch.

== Third generation (2013–2021) ==
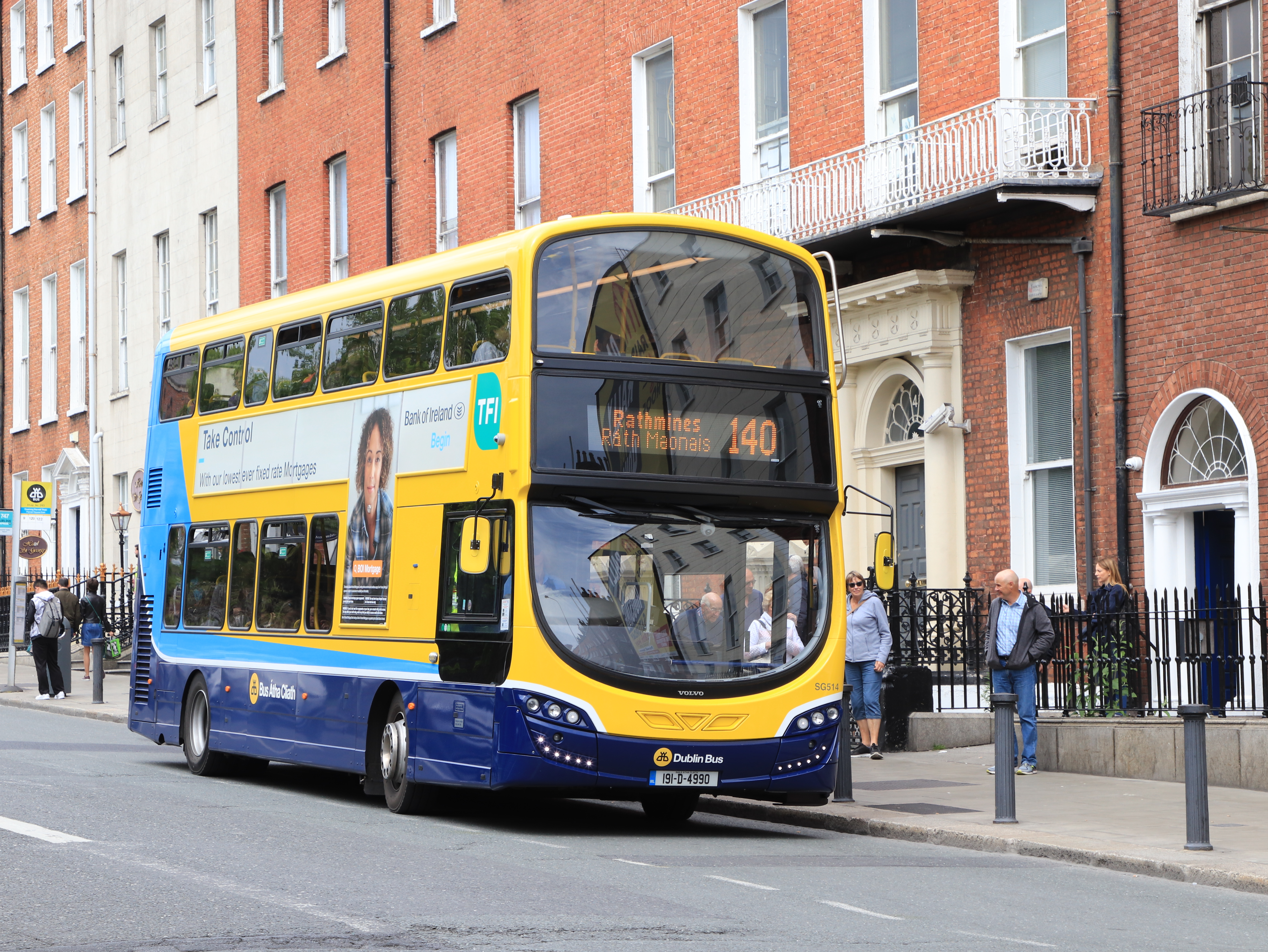
Dublin Bus Wright Gemini 3-bodied Volvo B5TL near Parnell Square in May 2019

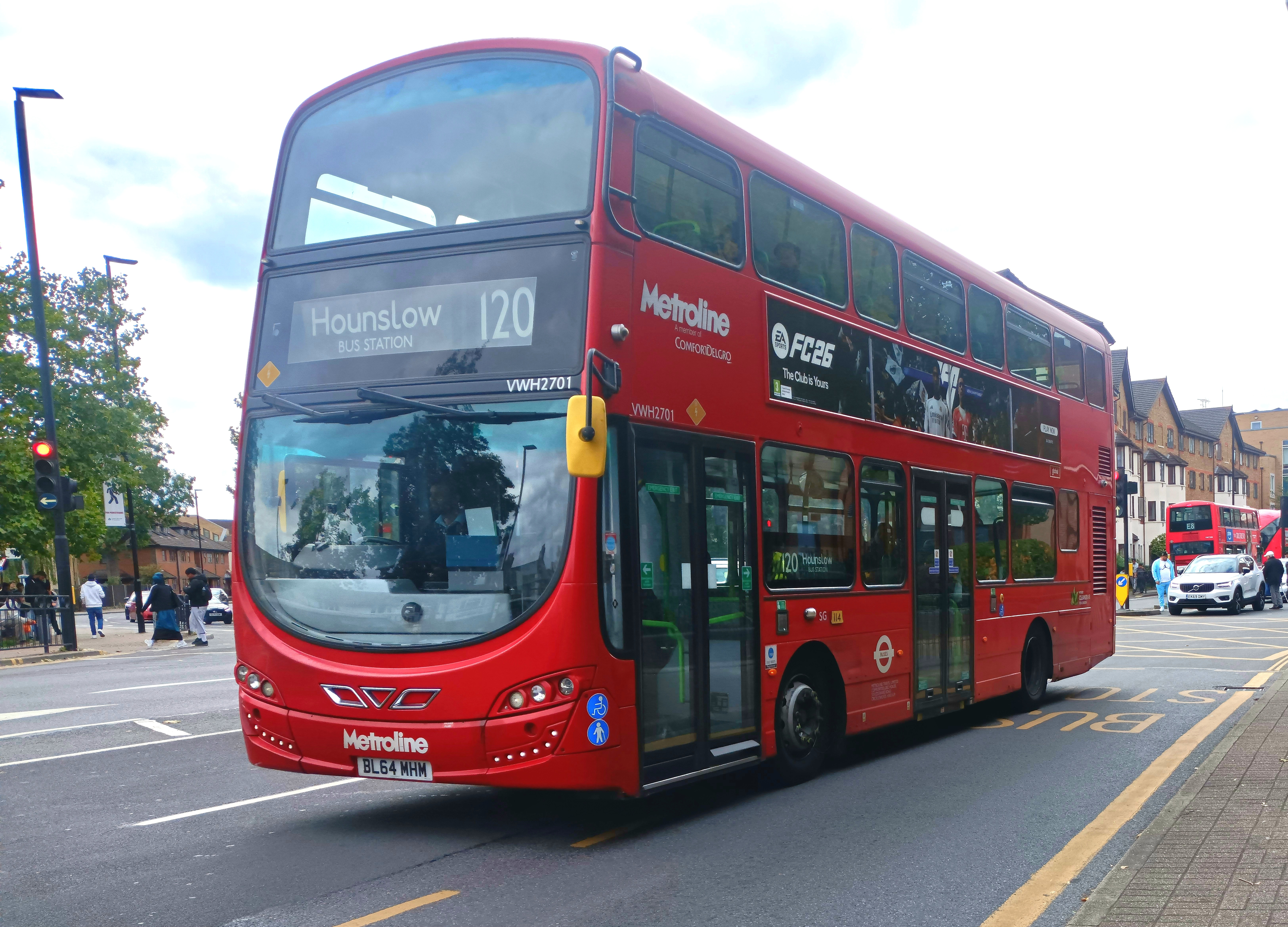
Metroline Wright Eclipse Gemini 3 bodied Volvo B5LH in September 2025

The third generation Wright Eclipse Gemini, now called simply the Gemini 3, was launched in 2013 for the new Volvo B5TL chassis, the eventual replacement of the B9TL. The Gemini 3 also remained available on Volvo B5LH hybrid chassis. Some design features were taken from the New Routemaster, another Wrightbus design. The two most noticeable aesthetic changes were a substantial redesign of the rear end and the introduction of smaller upper deck windows to save weight; the front light clusters were also slightly redesigned, in order to incorporate separate LED daytime running lights for the first time.

The majority of orders for the pre-facelift Wright Gemini 3 were placed by Dublin Bus, who have taken over 600 of the type on from 2014 onwards, the majority of which were built on the Volvo B5TL chassis. Some of these have since transferred to Go-Ahead Ireland following the retendering of Dublin Bus services to the new company by the National Transport Authority.

In London, pre-facelift Wright Gemini 3s on the Volvo B5LH chassis were delivered to Stagecoach London, who took delivery of 32 of the type in 2014 for service on route 53; these were subsequently disposed of to Arriva London in 2018. Metroline, meanwhile, took delivery of 95 B5LHs with pre-facelift Wright Gemini 3 bodies, and in 2015, London United took delivery of 28 Gemini 3s, with Tower Transit also taking delivery of eleven Gemini 3s.

Lothian Buses purchased 25 pre-facelift Wright Gemini 3s on the Volvo B5TL chassis in 2014, and Yellow Buses took delivery of eight Gemini 3s on Volvo B5TL chassis in 2015. Delaine Buses purchased three Wright Gemini 3-bodied B5TLs between 2015 and 2017.

=== 2014 facelift ===
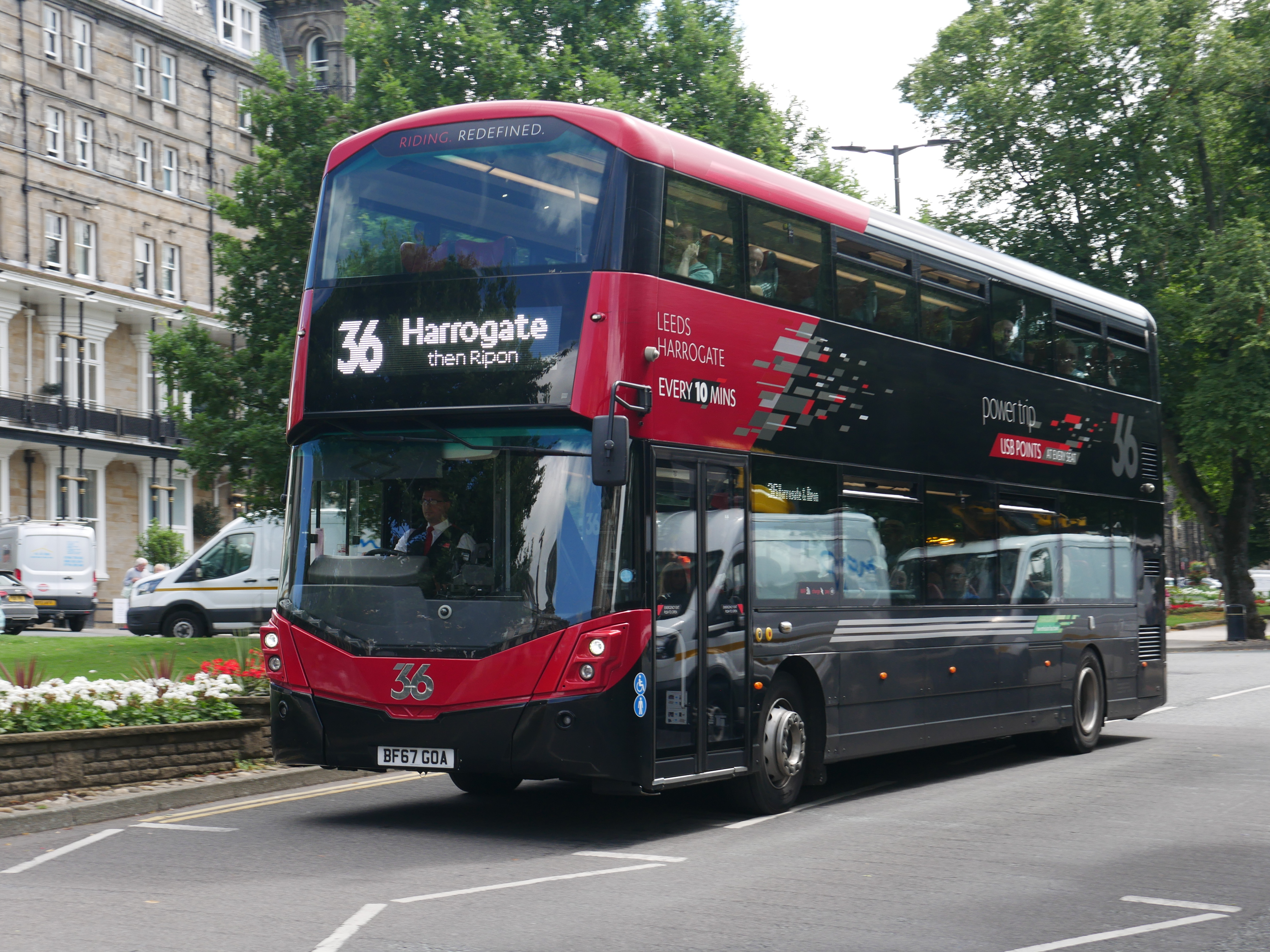
Harrogate Bus Company standard height Wright Gemini 3-bodied Volvo B5TL in Harrogate in August 2022

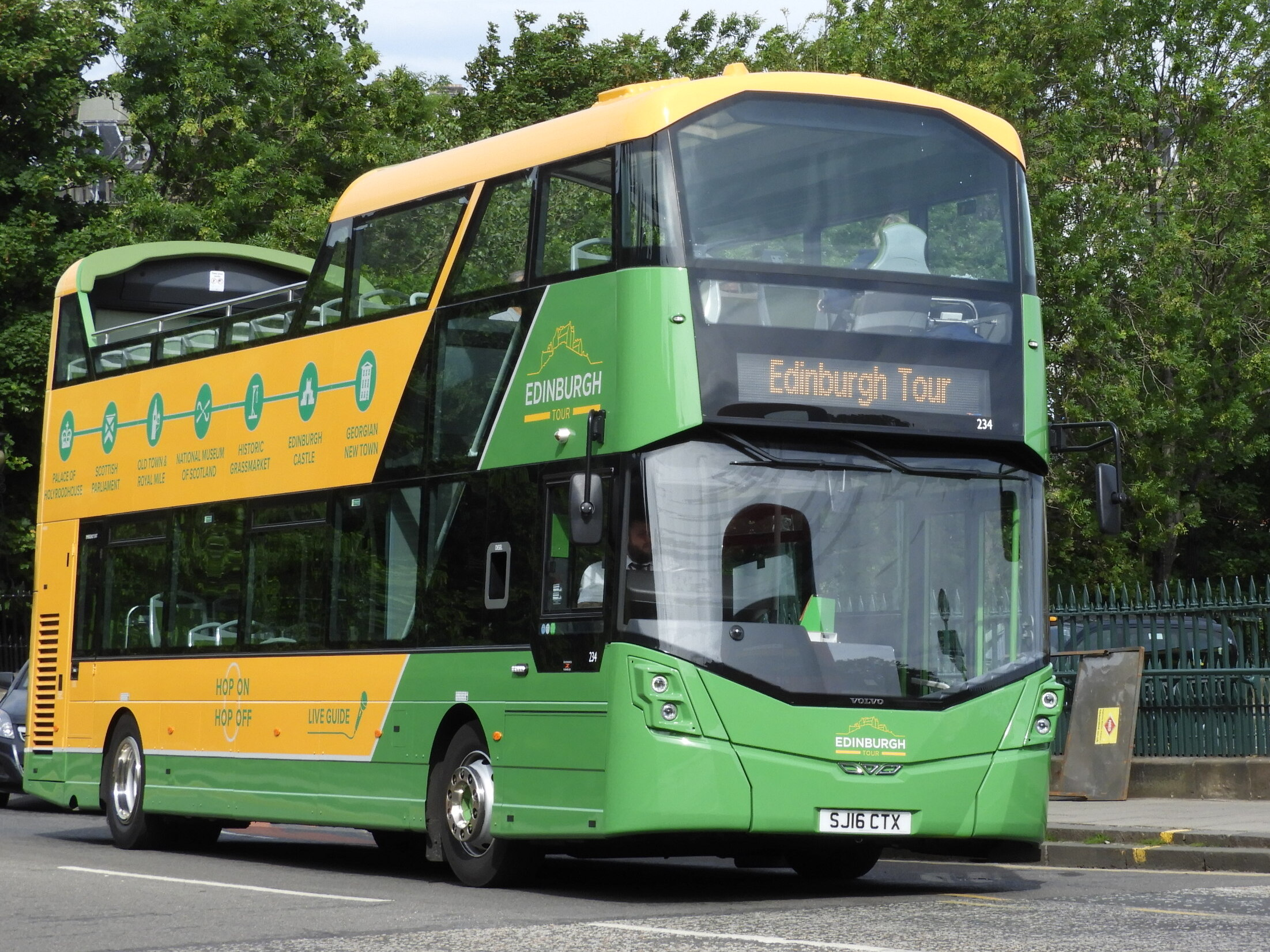
Lothian Buses Wright Gemini 3 open top-bodied Volvo B5TL in Edinburgh in June 2018

Arriva Merseyside low-height Wright Gemini 3 bodied Volvo B5LH in Liverpool in September 2026

In 2014, to coincide with the launch of the integral Wright StreetDeck, the Gemini 3 underwent a facelift. Both the front and rear ends were substantially redesigned to match the StreetDeck.

Lothian Buses took delivery of a large number of facelift Wright Gemini 3s on the Volvo B5TL and B5LH chassis from 2015 until 2019, many of which were ordered through a four-year agreement signed in 2016 with Wrightbus to supply new buses to Lothian's fleet. A majority of these Gemini 3s were delivered for the standard fleet to replace older buses, however some were also delivered for use on Airlink and Skylink services, the latter of which was specified to operate B5LH hybrids.

The facelift Wright Gemini 3 also can be configured as a purpose-built open top bus. The biggest customer for the open-top Gemini 3 is Lothian Buses, who took 30 examples for use on the company's City Sightseeing, Edinburgh Tour and Majestic Tour operations in 2016. Stagecoach Cumbria & North Lancashire, meanwhile, received seven open-top Gemini 3s on the Volvo B5TL chassis for use on the operator's Lakesider sightseeing service in the Lake District in 2017, and Stagecoach East received six B5TL Gemini 3 open-toppers in 2018 for its City Sightseeing operations in Cambridge.

Translink, who were a launch customer for the facelift Wright Gemini 3, standardised on both pre and post-facelift Gemini 3s on the Volvo B5TL chassis, with a majority being delivered to Metro for use in Belfast. Ten facelift Gemini 3s were also delivered in May 2017 for Airport Express services serving Belfast International Airport.

Transdev Blazefield first took delivery of 14 high-specification facelift Gemini 3s on the Volvo B5TL chassis to upgrade their 36 service in 2016, which was followed by the purchase of ten similar buses for the Yorkshire Coastliner service in 2016. Both services received three more Gemini 3s in 2017.

First Greater Manchester purchased 20 facelift Gemini 3s on Volvo B5LH hybrid chassis in 2015 for use on Transport for Greater Manchester-contracted Vantage services on the Leigh-Salford-Manchester Bus Rapid Transit scheme, with five more acquired in 2016 to cope with increasing demand. Arriva Merseyside also received 51 facelift Gemini 3s built with low-height bodies on the Volvo B5LH chassis between 2016 and 2017. Smaller orders for the facelift Gemini 3 on the Volvo B5TL chassis, meanwhile, include the University of Wolverhampton, who took delivery of five Gemini 3s for shuttle services between the university's campuses in 2017, and Sanders Services, who took delivery of the final two Gemini 3s produced in 2021.

==== Exports ====
The first three-axle Volvo B8L delivered to SBS Transit in Singapore in 2017 received a facelifted Gemini 3 bodywork and was registered as SG4003D. It failed trials in Singapore as a demonstrator for 3 years, and was subsequently bought by private operator A&S Transit (bus is now registered as PD169L).

Hong Kong's franchised bus operators have also placed orders for Volvo B8Ls with Gemini 3 bodywork – 200 for Kowloon Motor Bus, 10 for Long Win Bus, 46 for Citybus and 7 for New World First Bus. KMB's vehicles entered service in March 2018, with Citybus and New World First Bus's examples entering service in December 2019.

Hato Bus ordered 5 sightseeing buses in December 2018 on the twin-axle Scania K410EB chassis. These were delivered sometime in 2020 and were unveiled in 2021.

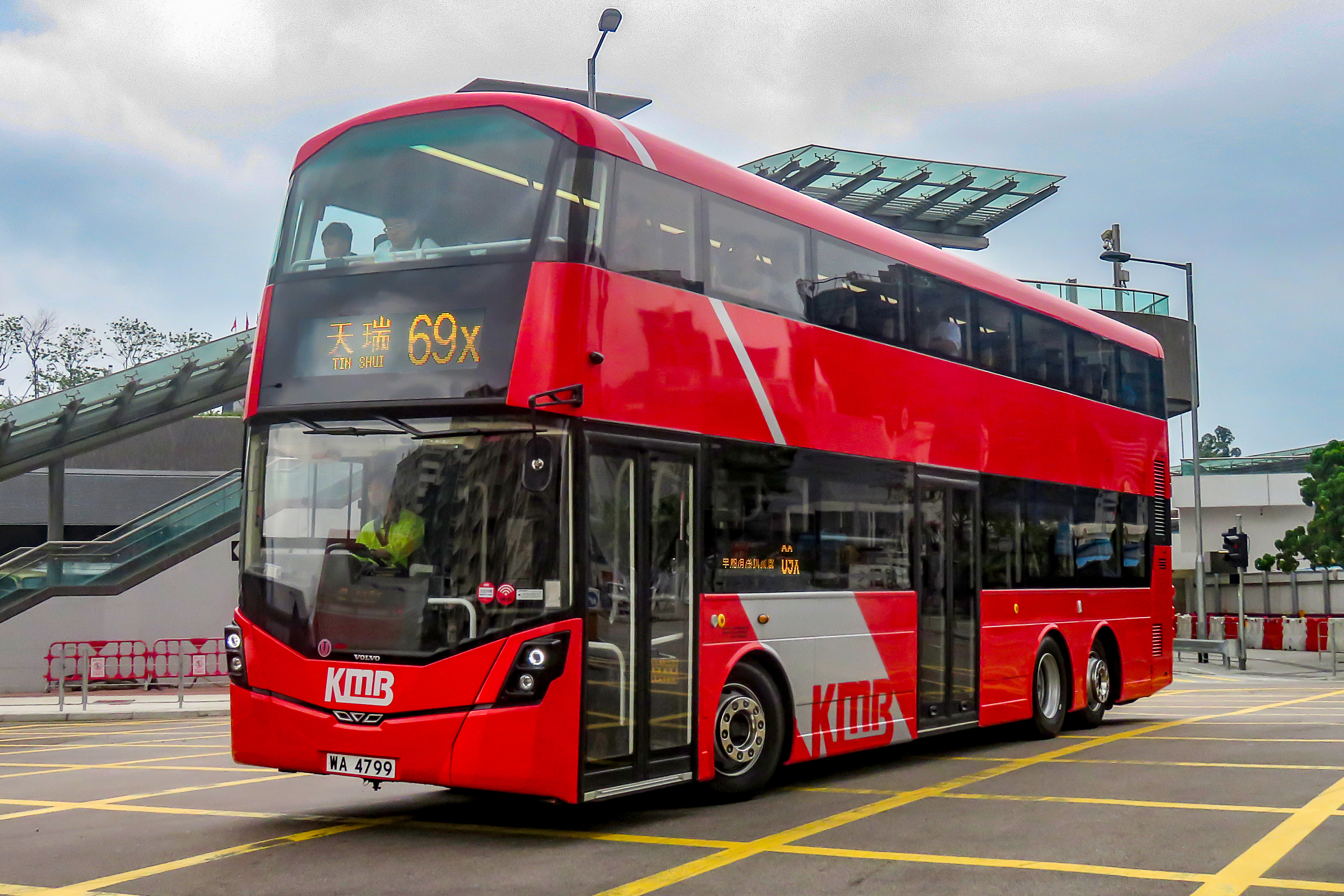
Kowloon Motor Bus Wright Gemini 3-bodied Volvo B8L in Hong Kong

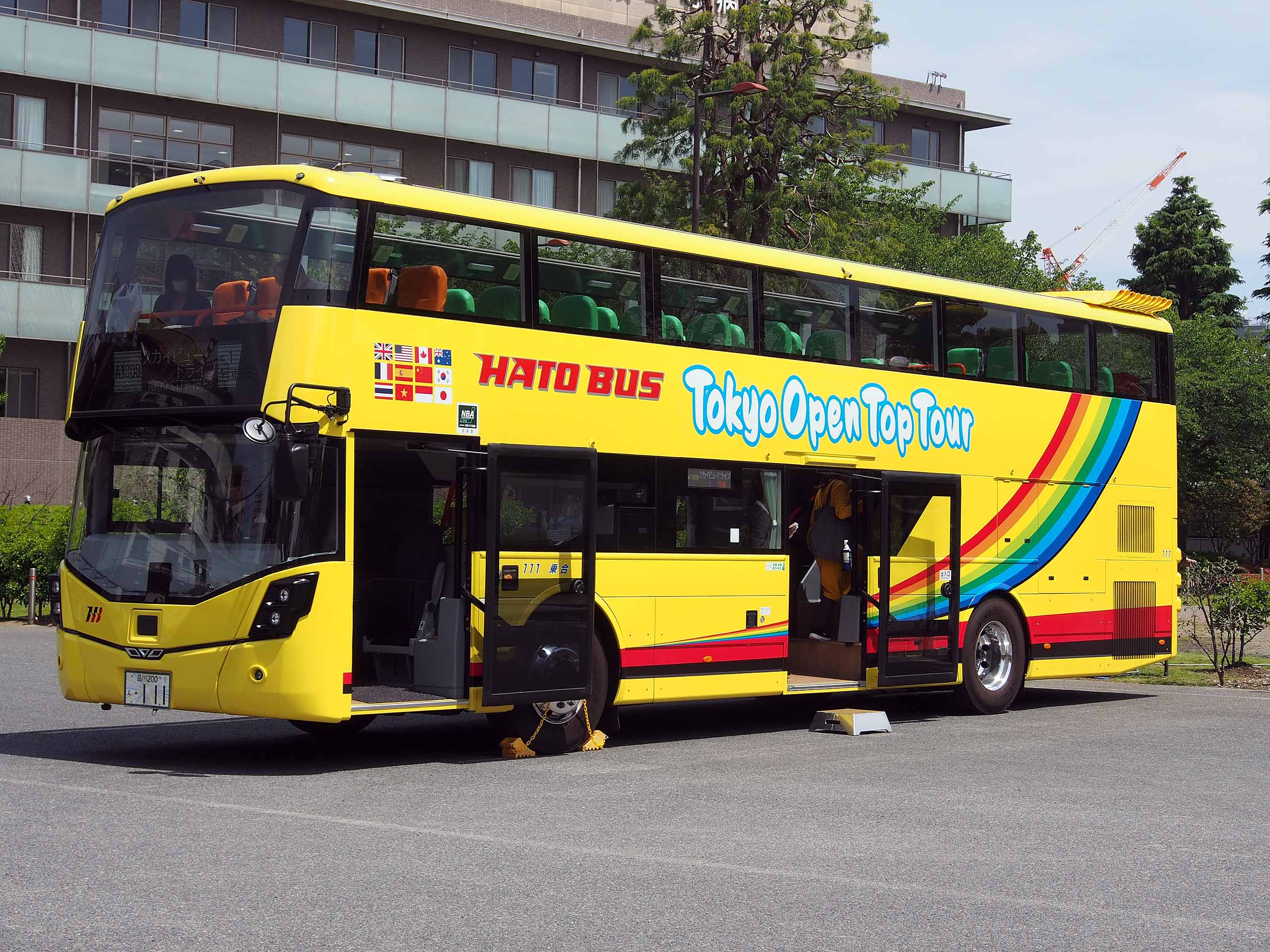
Hato Bus open-top Wright Gemini 3-bodied Scania K410EB in Tokyo

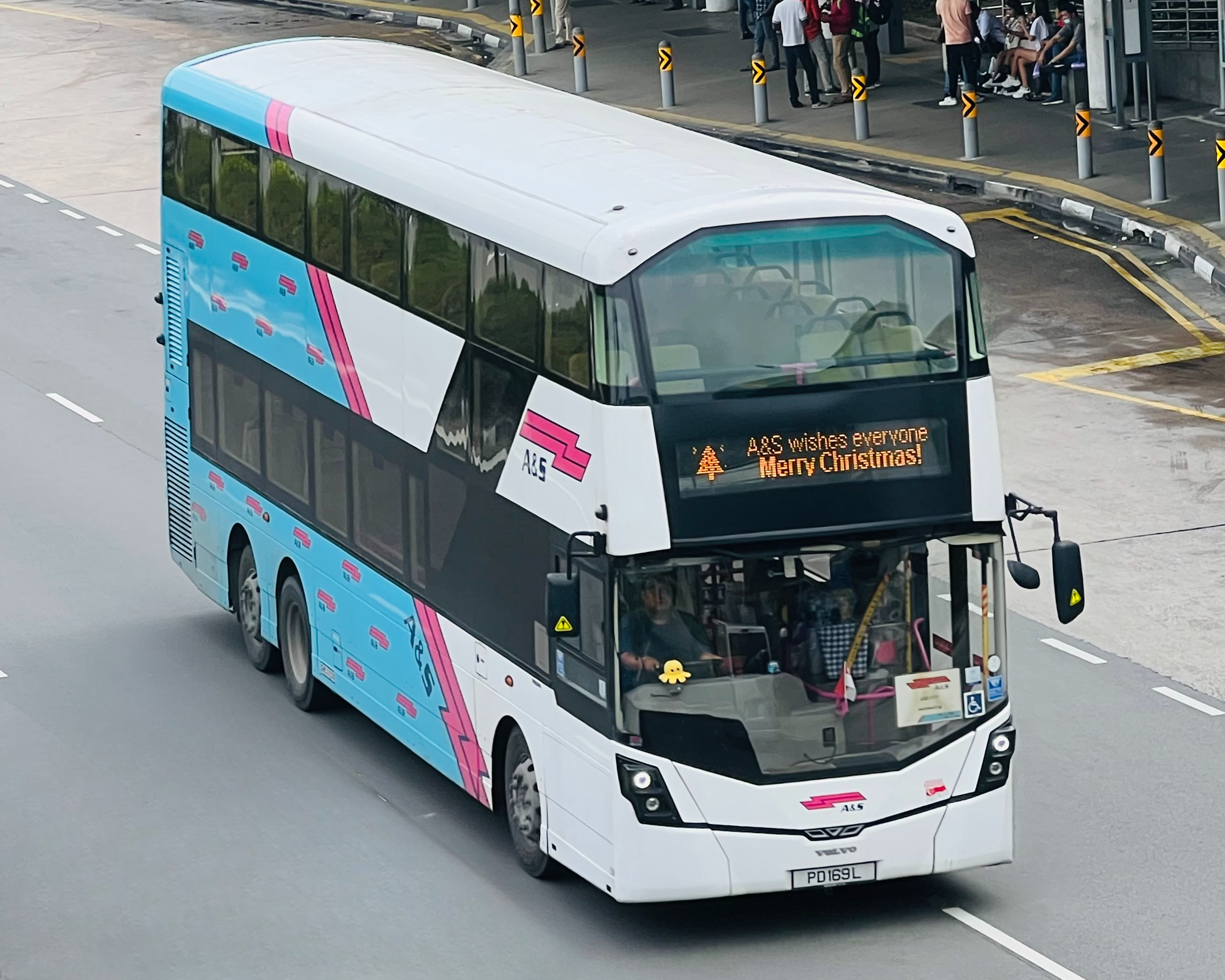
A&S Transit Wright Gemini 3-bodied Volvo B8L in Singapore

== See also ==
- Wright StreetDeck
- List of buses

Competitors:

- Alexander Dennis Enviro400 MMC
- Alexander Dennis Enviro500 MMC
- Optare MetroDecker
