= Volvo B8L =

3-axle bus chassis manufactured by Volvo

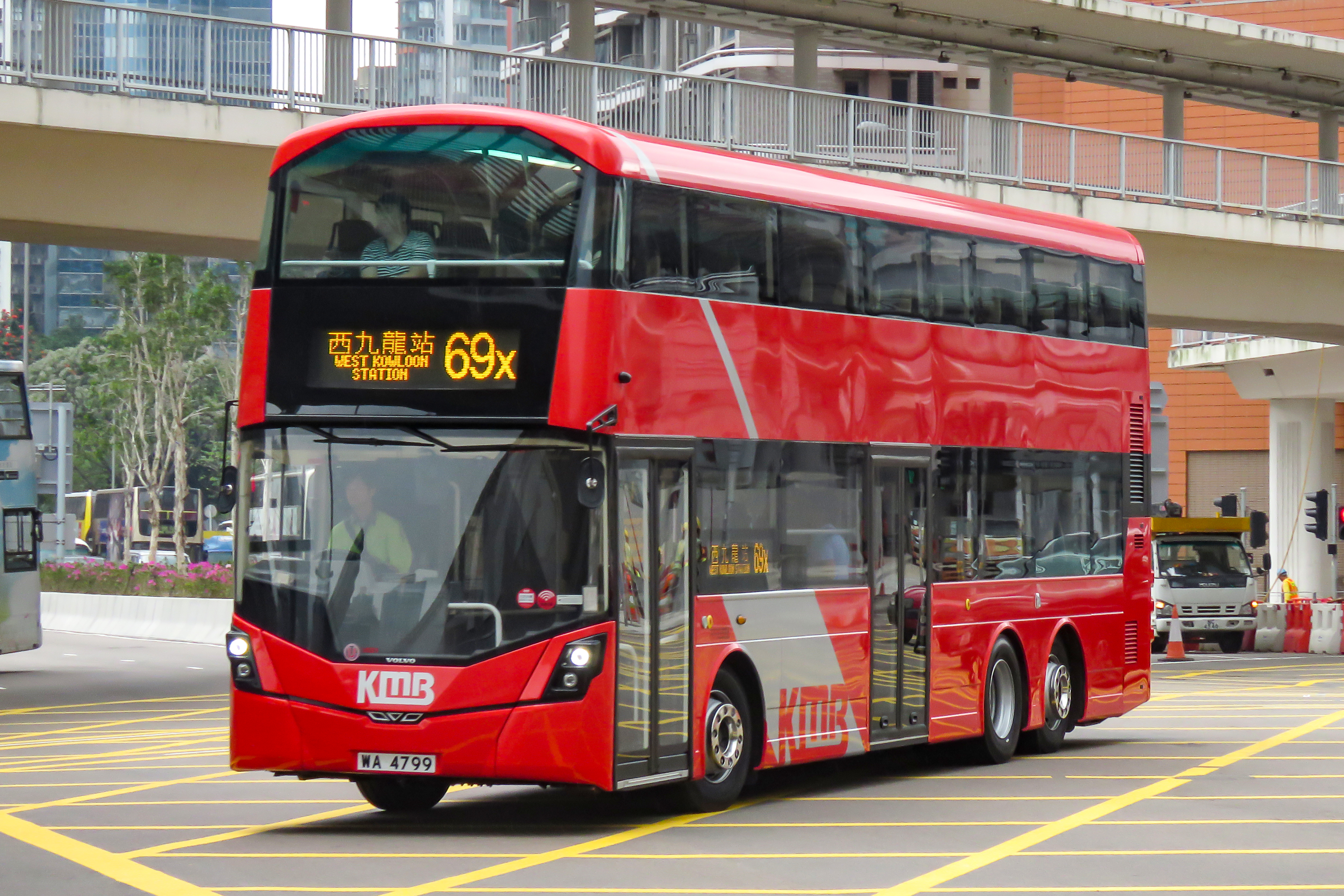
- Kowloon Motor Bus Wright Gemini 3-bodied Volvo B8L in March 2019

Overview
- Manufacturer: Volvo
- Production: 2016 - present
- Assembly: Borås, Sweden

Body and chassis
- Floor type: Low floor
- Related: Volvo B5TL

Powertrain
- Engine: Volvo D8K-350 6-cylinder
- Capacity: 7.7l
- Transmission: ZF EcoLife; Voith DIWA

Dimensions
- Length: 12 m (39 ft 4 in); 12.8 m (42 ft 0 in); 13.4 m (44 ft 0 in)
- Height: up to 14 ft 5 in (4.39 m)

Chronology
- Predecessor: 3-axle Volvo B9TL

The Volvo B8L is a 3-axle bus chassis, for double-decker buses, manufactured by Volvo Buses since 2018, with pre-production batches starting production early in 2016. It is powered by Volvo D8K-350 6-cylinder 350hp 7.7-litre engine that is Euro 6 compliant, using selective catalytic reduction technology, and a 6-speed automatic ZF EcoLife 6AP 1400C or 4-speed automatic Voith DIWA 864.6 gearbox.

== History ==
In 2017, two pre-production Volvo B8Ls were completed; one with a Wright Eclipse Gemini 2 body that entered service with Kowloon Motor Bus (KMB) in Hong Kong (Registered as UU8290, fleet number AVBWL1) and the Wright Gemini 3 bodied example with SBS Transit in Singapore (registered as SG4003D). SG4003D was also among the first Euro VI compliant public buses in Singapore. It was deployed on several SBS Transit routes (71, 94, 804, 806, 807, 851) during its 3 years of service.

The Volvo B8L was officially launched in January 2018 as a successor to the Volvo B9TL.

In October 2018, orders for 213 Wrightbus bodied examples for Hong Kong were announced, 46 for Citybus, 150 for KMB, 10 for Long Win Bus and seven for New World First Bus. This was followed in November with an announcement of 42 Alexander Dennis Enviro400 XLB-bodied vehicles for Lothian Buses of Edinburgh, with a subsequent order for another 36 vehicles bringing their total to 78.

In October 2019, KMB ordered 110 MCV-bodied B8Ls, the first batch of B8Ls to be 12.8 metre length. Some of these have been shipped to Hong Kong as of July 2020, and they entered service in October 2020.

In November 2019, Prasarana Malaysia ordered 90 Gemilang Coachworks-bodied B8L's for RapidKL's Rapid Bus fleet as part of its fleet replacement programme. The first 3 buses, registered as VEN634, VEN1373 and VEN9768 entered service with RapidKL on 1 June 2020, with the remaining units to be delivered and operated in stages. The Volvo B8Ls are deployed on routes 300, 450, 600, 640, 770 and 772.

In January 2021, Long Win Bus issued a contract to Volvo Buses Hong Kong. The contract stated that the ten B8Ls in Long Win Bus's possession will have their luggage racks removed and six extra seats installed. In addition these buses will be re-painted with KMB's livery and transferred to KMB service. This is done due to Long Win Bus reaching its maximum number of buses in operation and the drastic decrease in the number of passengers going from the New Territories to the Hong Kong International Airport, of which this service is the sole franchise Long Win Bus has, due to the COVID-19 pandemic.

As of August 2020, 159 Volvo B8Ls are in service with KMB, 23 are in service with Citybus (Fleet numbers 8800-8822), 7 are in service with NWFB (Fleet numbers 5230-5236) and 10 are in service with RapidKL.

3 Volvo B8Ls with Gemilang bodies were delivered to Australia in March 2022 and entered service in May 2022. As of September 2024, all 3 are currently in service with Transit Systems NSW in Sydney, operating out of its Smithfield Depot.

== Gallery ==
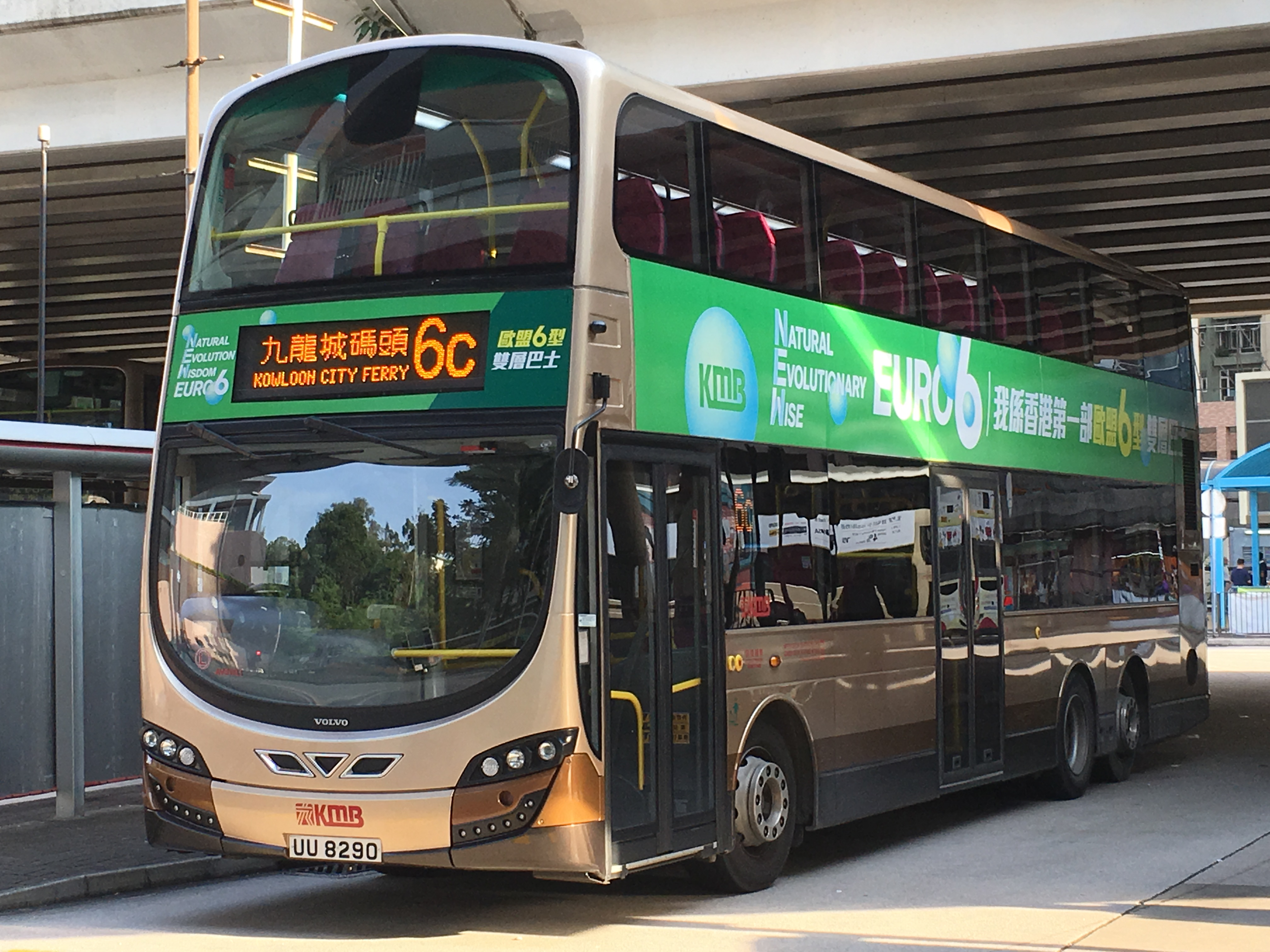
The Kowloon Motor Bus-operated Volvo B8L prototype with a Wright Eclipse Gemini 2 body

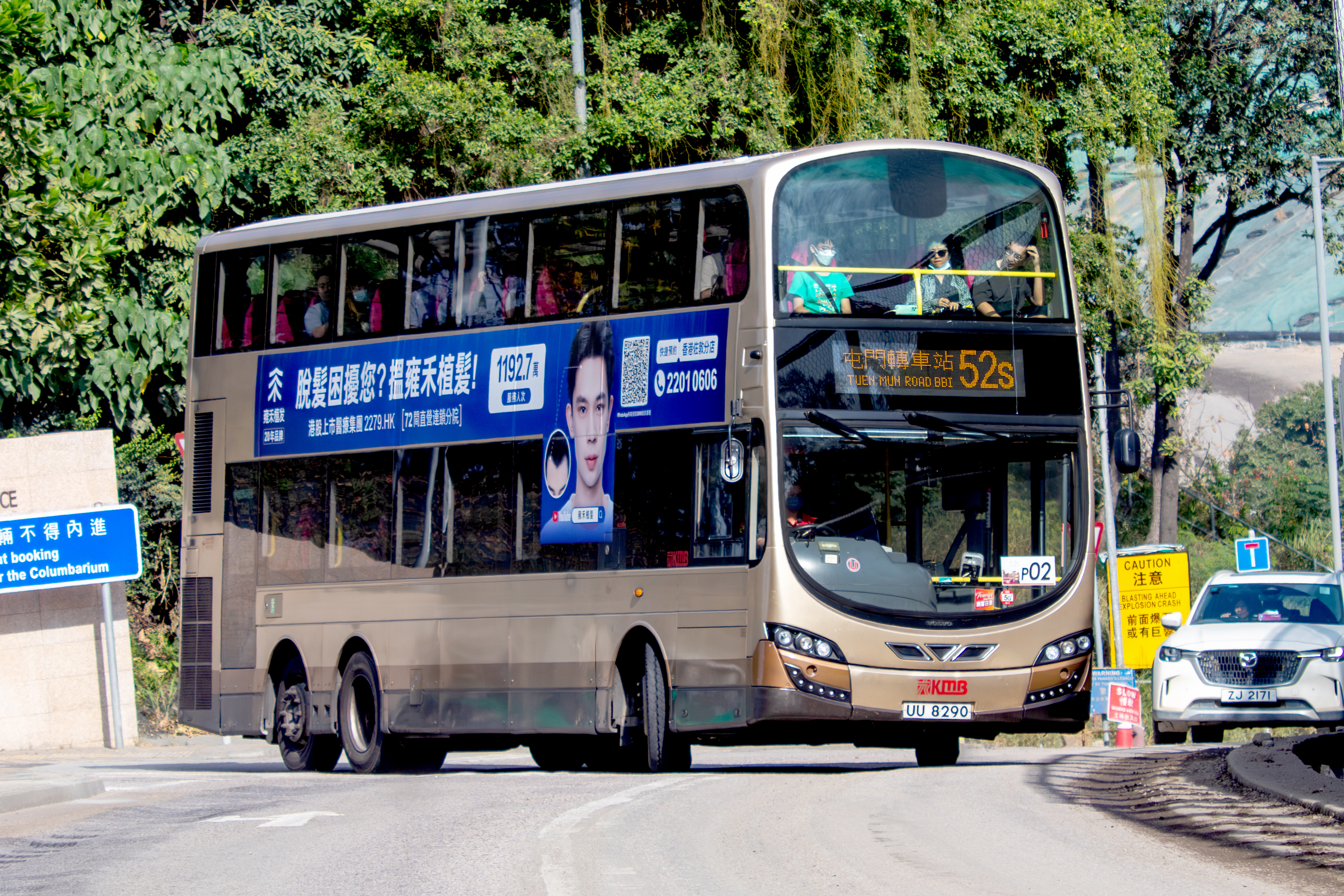
The Kowloon Motor Bus-operated Volvo B8L prototype with a Wright Eclipse Gemini 2 body

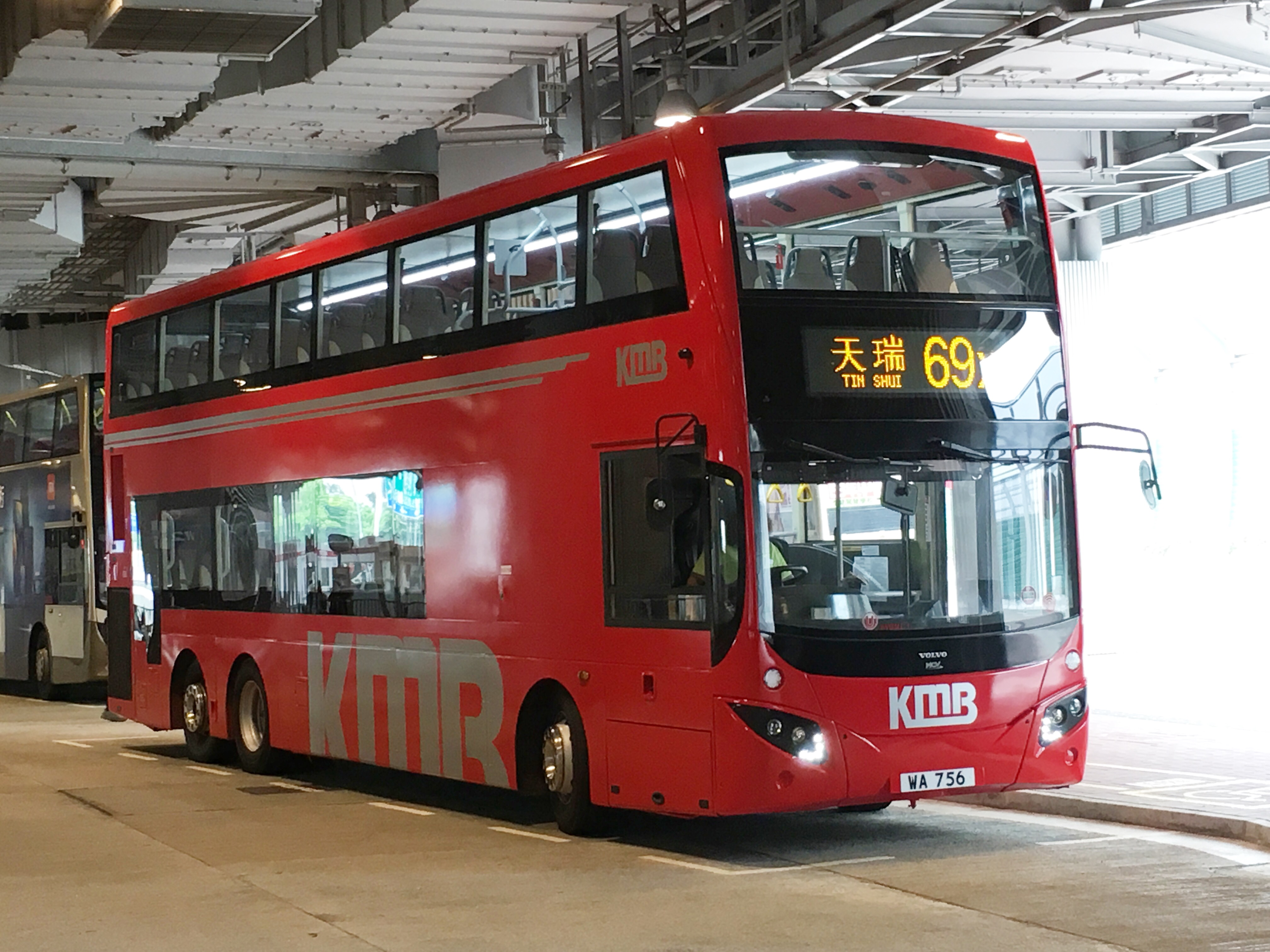
A Kowloon Motor Bus-operated Volvo B8L with a MCV EvoSeti body

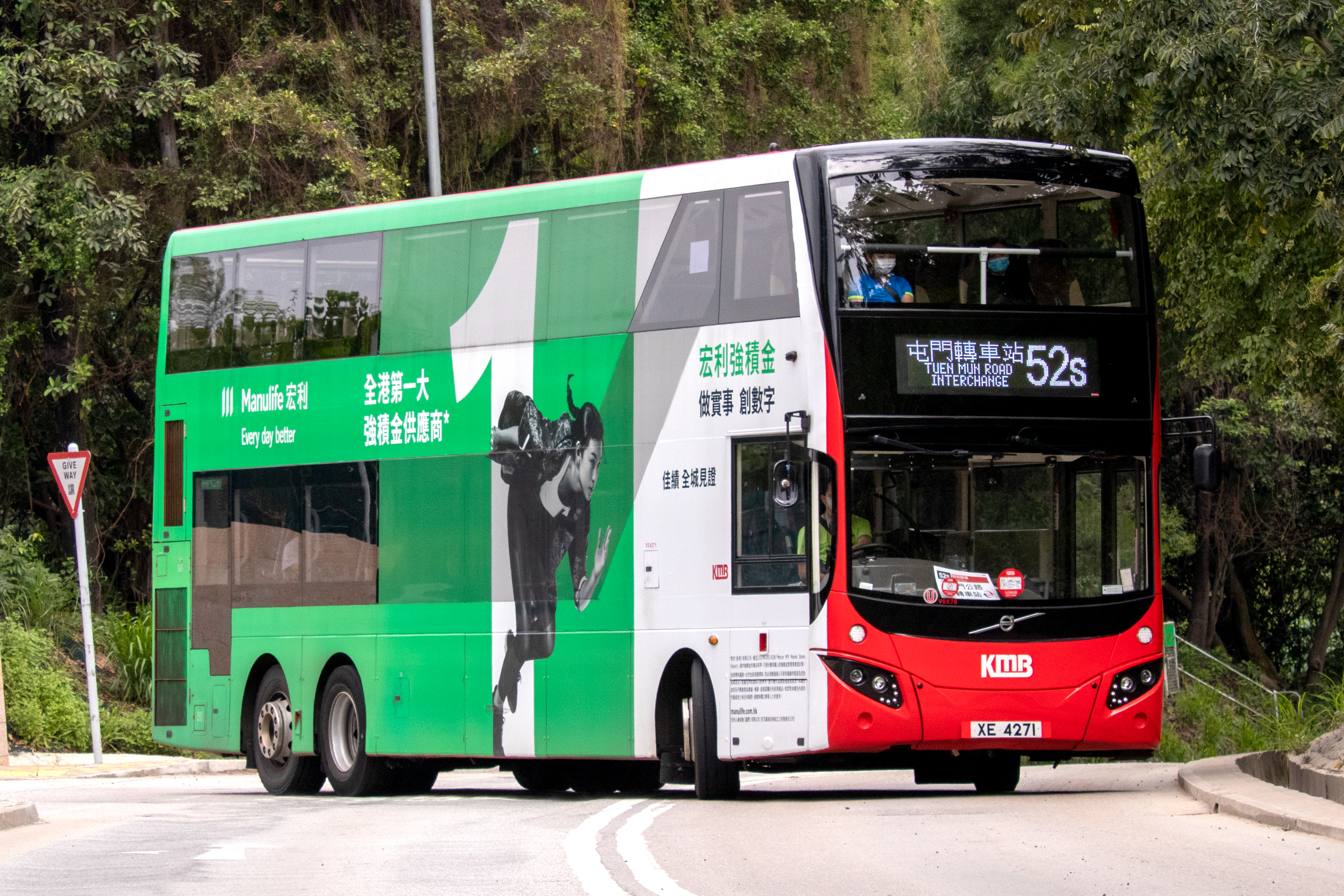
A Kowloon Motor Bus-operated Volvo B8L with a MCV EvoSeti body

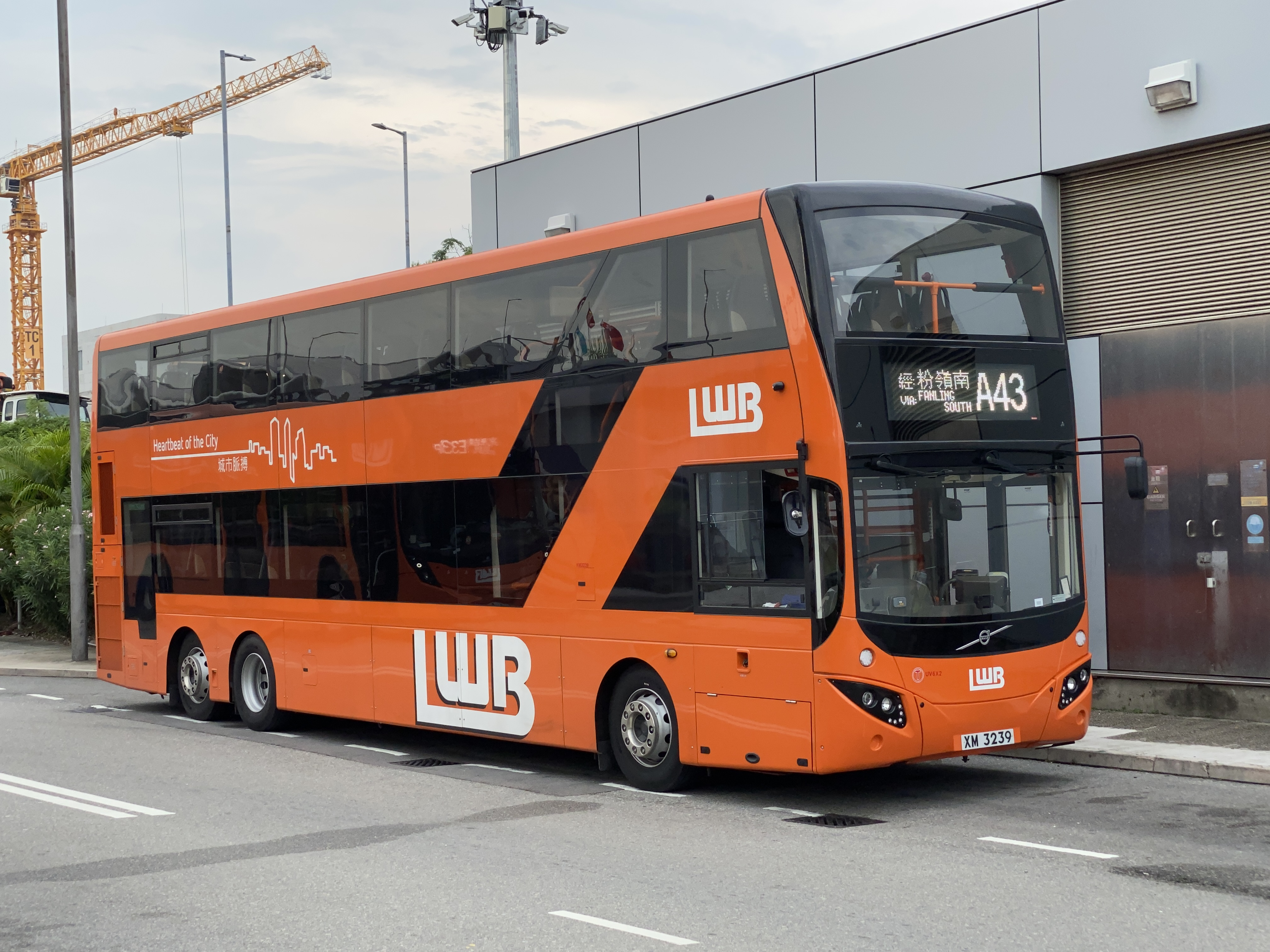
A Long Win Bus-operated Volvo B8L with a MCV EvoSeti body

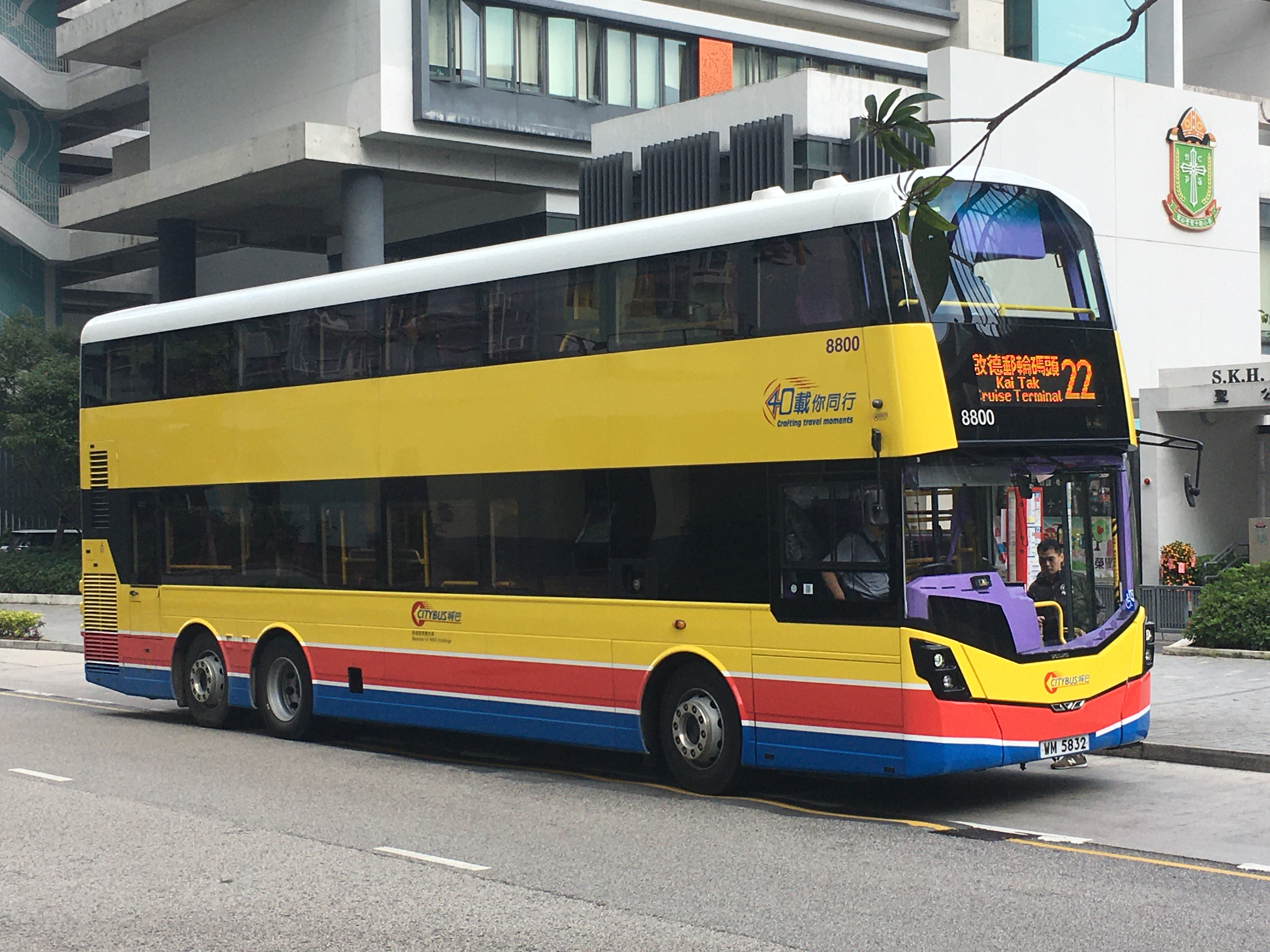
A Citybus-operated Volvo B8L with a Wright Gemini 3 body

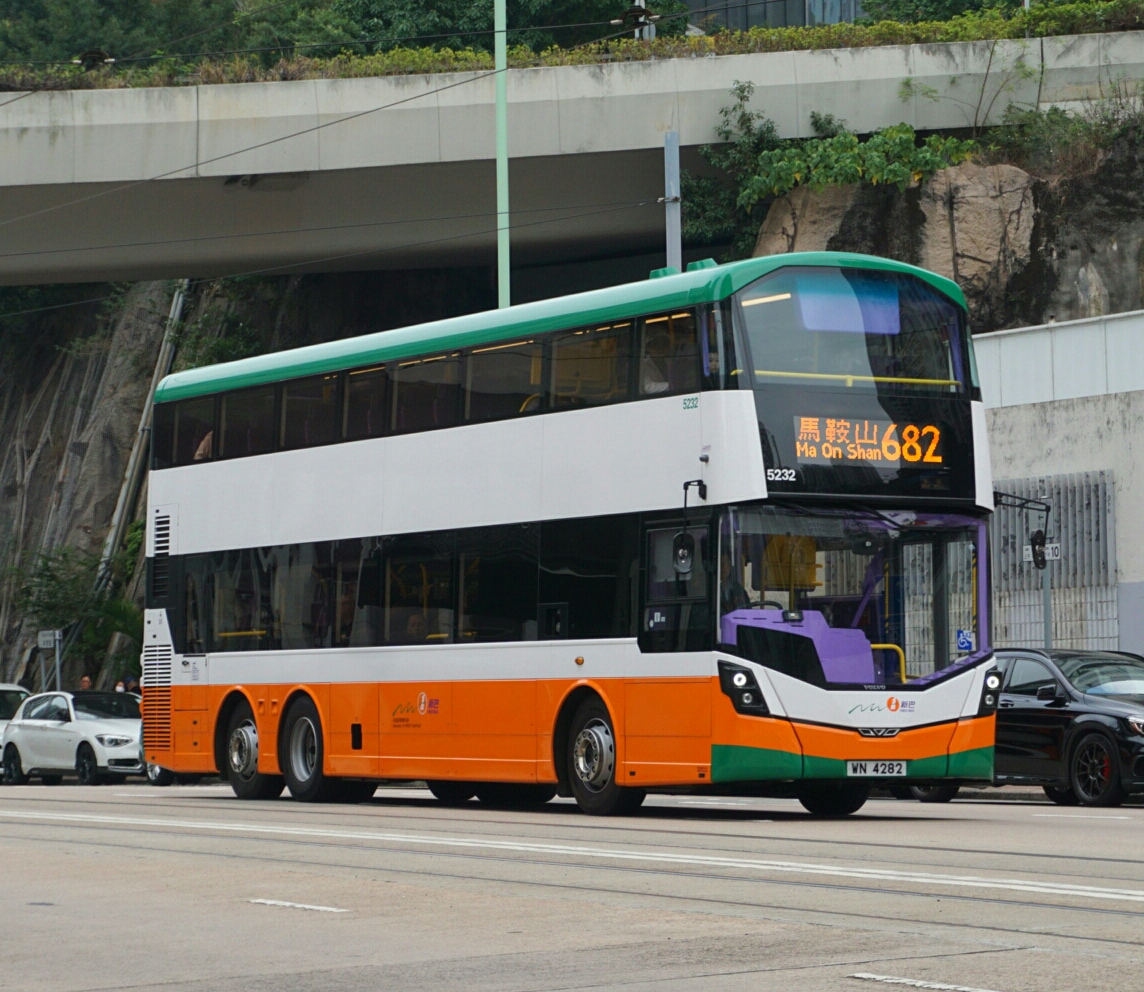
A New World First Bus-operated Volvo B8L with a Wright Gemini 3 body

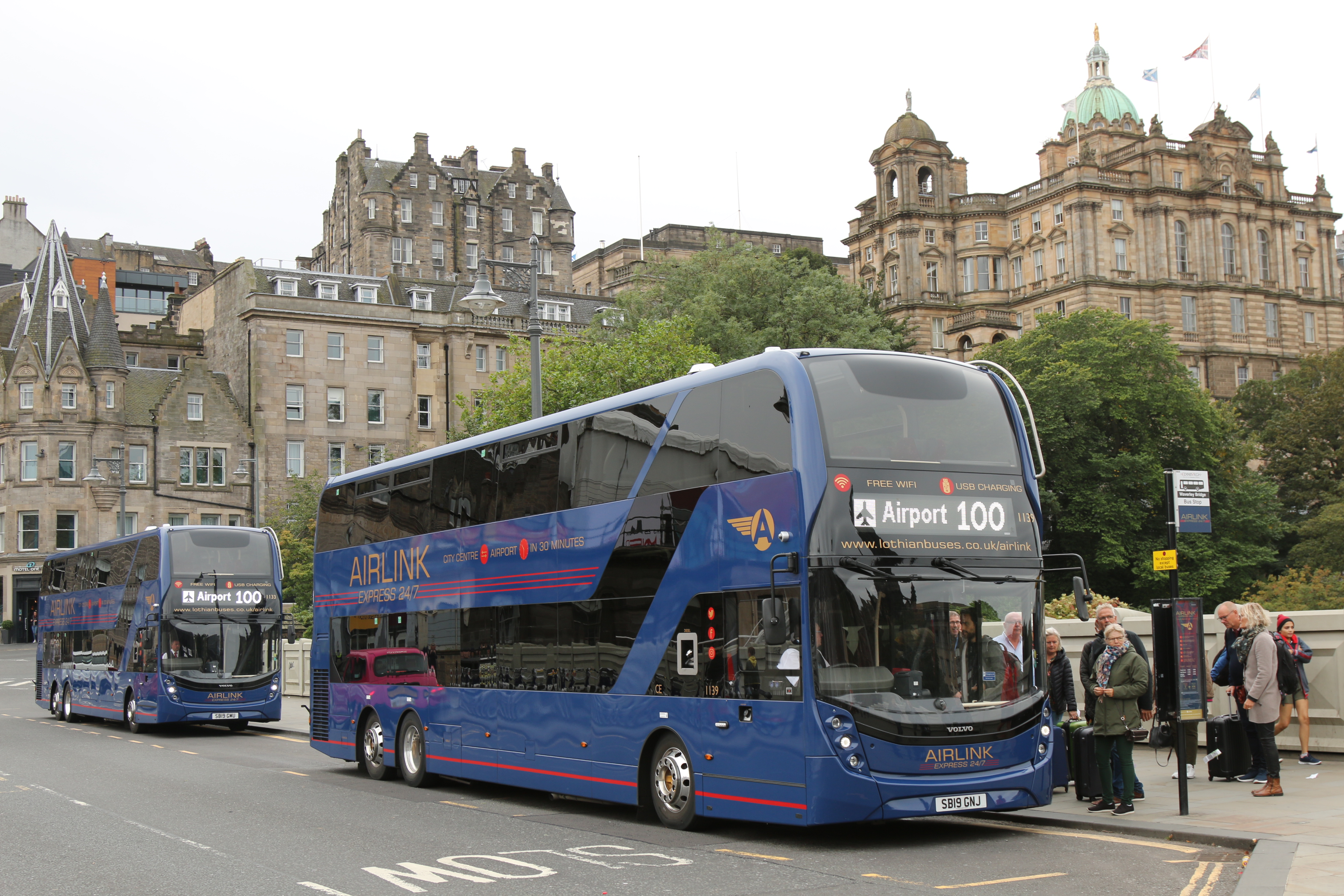
A Lothian Buses Alexander Dennis Enviro400XLB bodied Volvo B8L

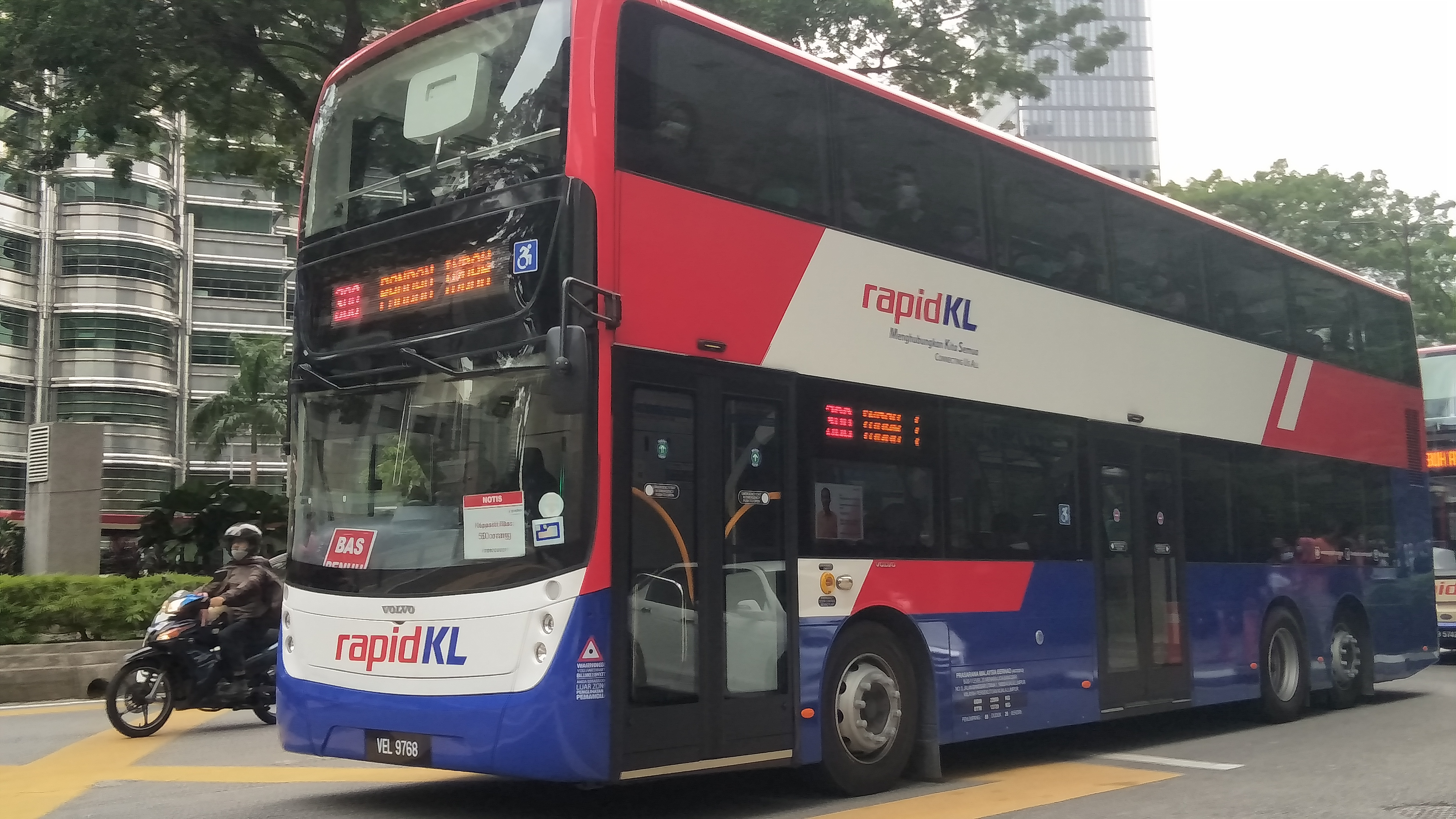
A Rapid KL-operated Volvo B8L with a Gemilang Coachworks body

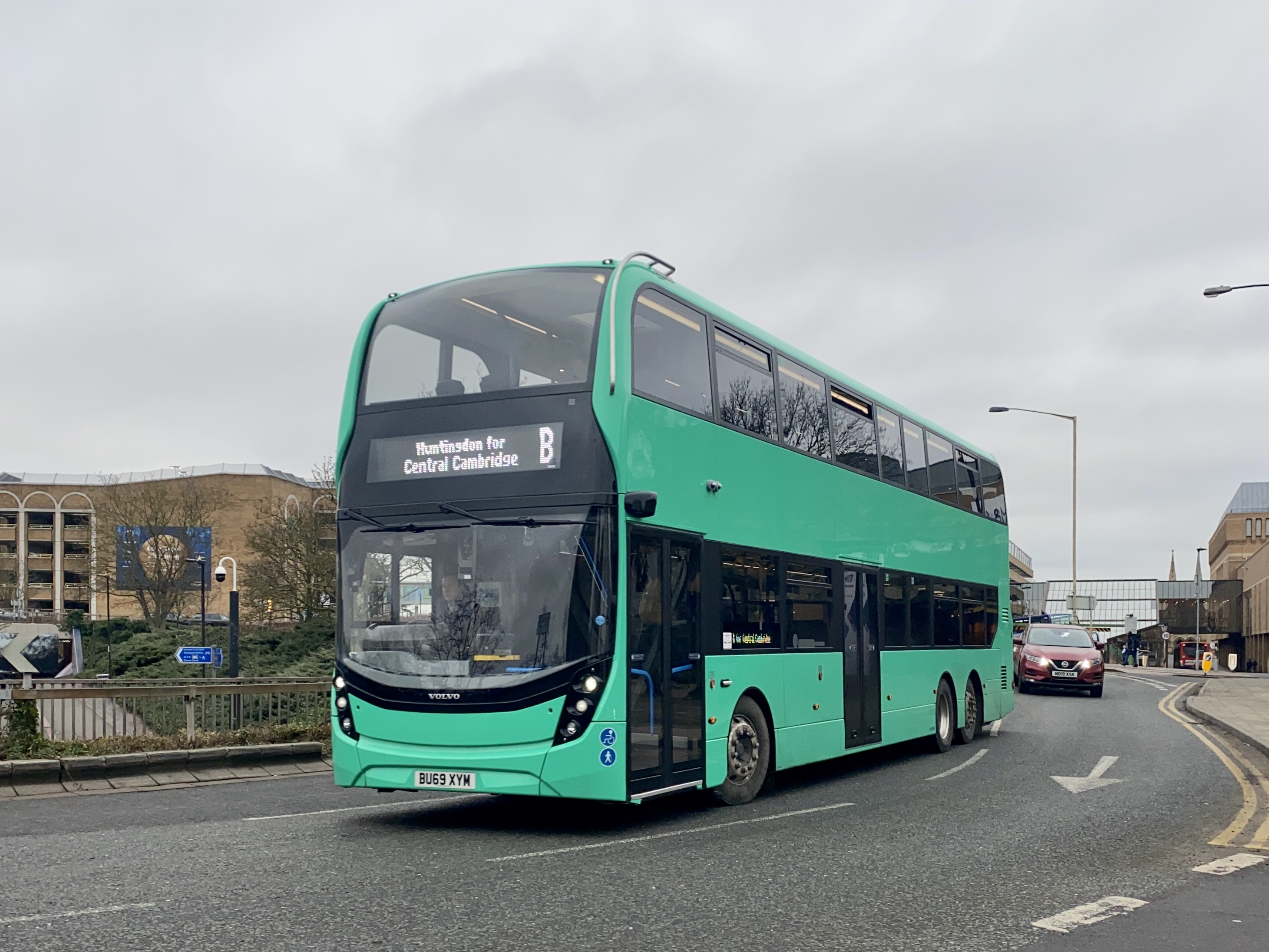
A Stagecoach East Alexander Dennis Enviro400 XLB bodied Volvo B8L

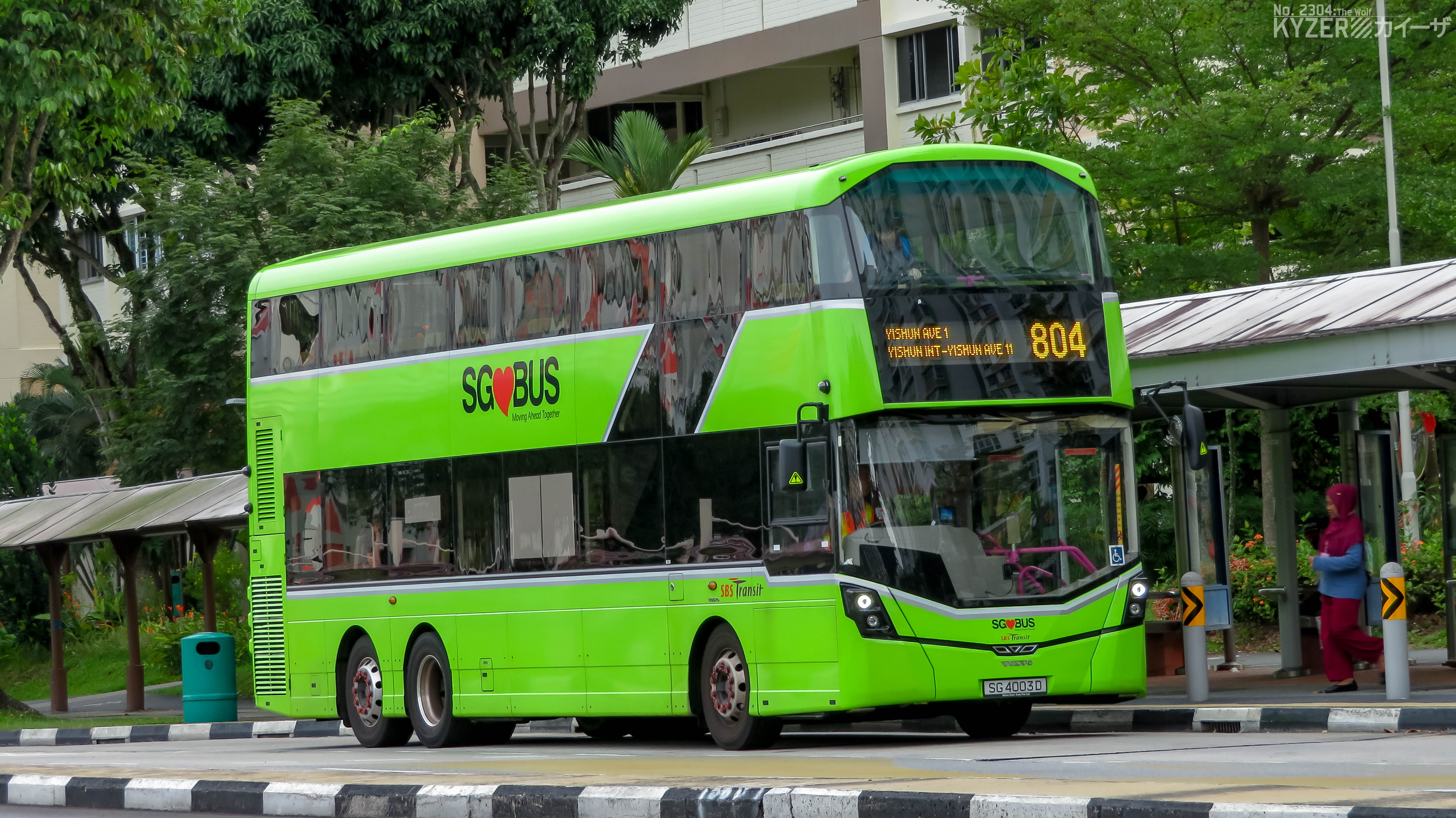
The sole Volvo B8L in Singapore with a Wright Gemini 3 body, then operated by SBS Transit

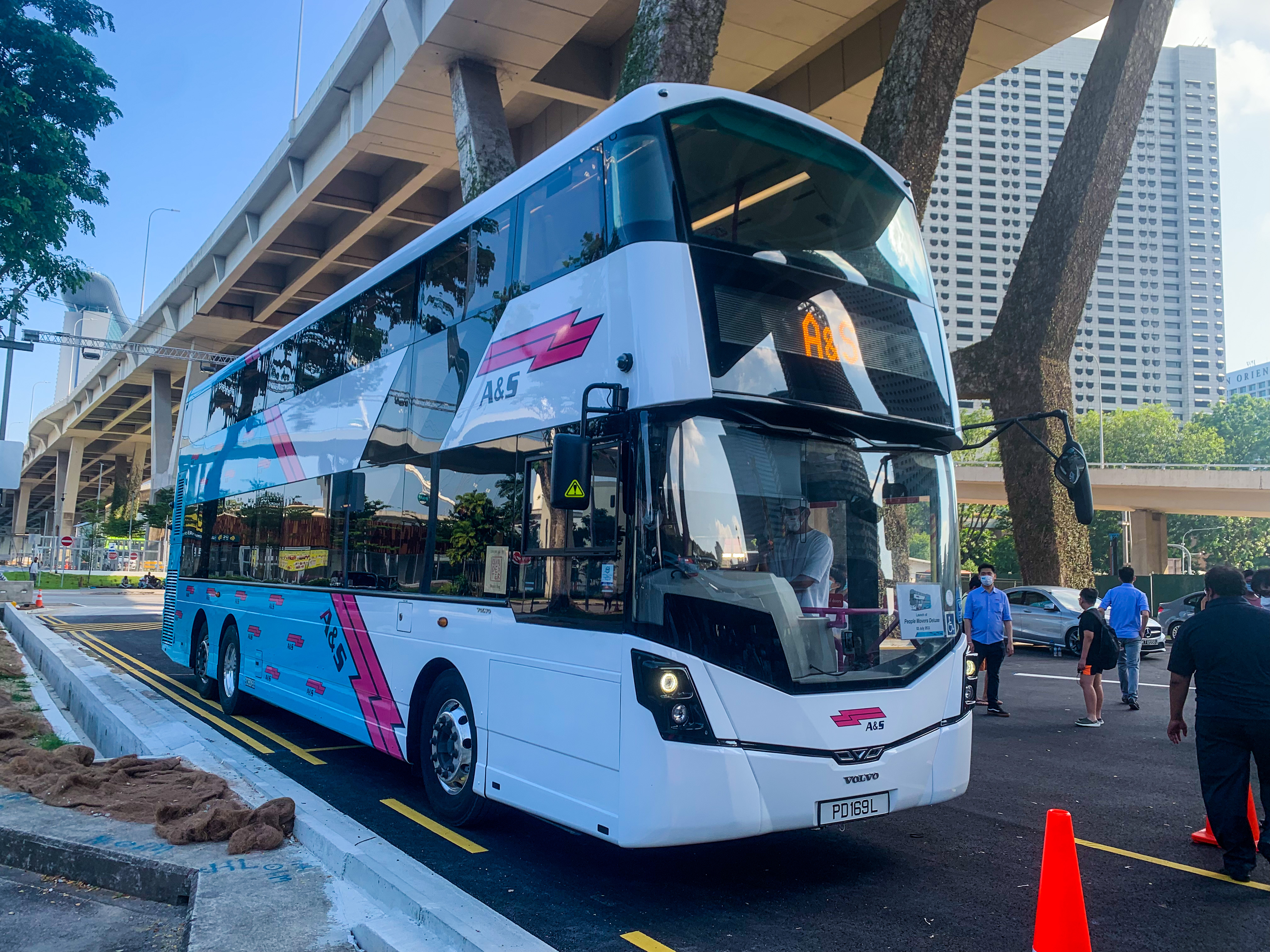
The same sole Volvo B8L in Singapore with a Wright Gemini 3 body, now operated by private operator A&S Transit

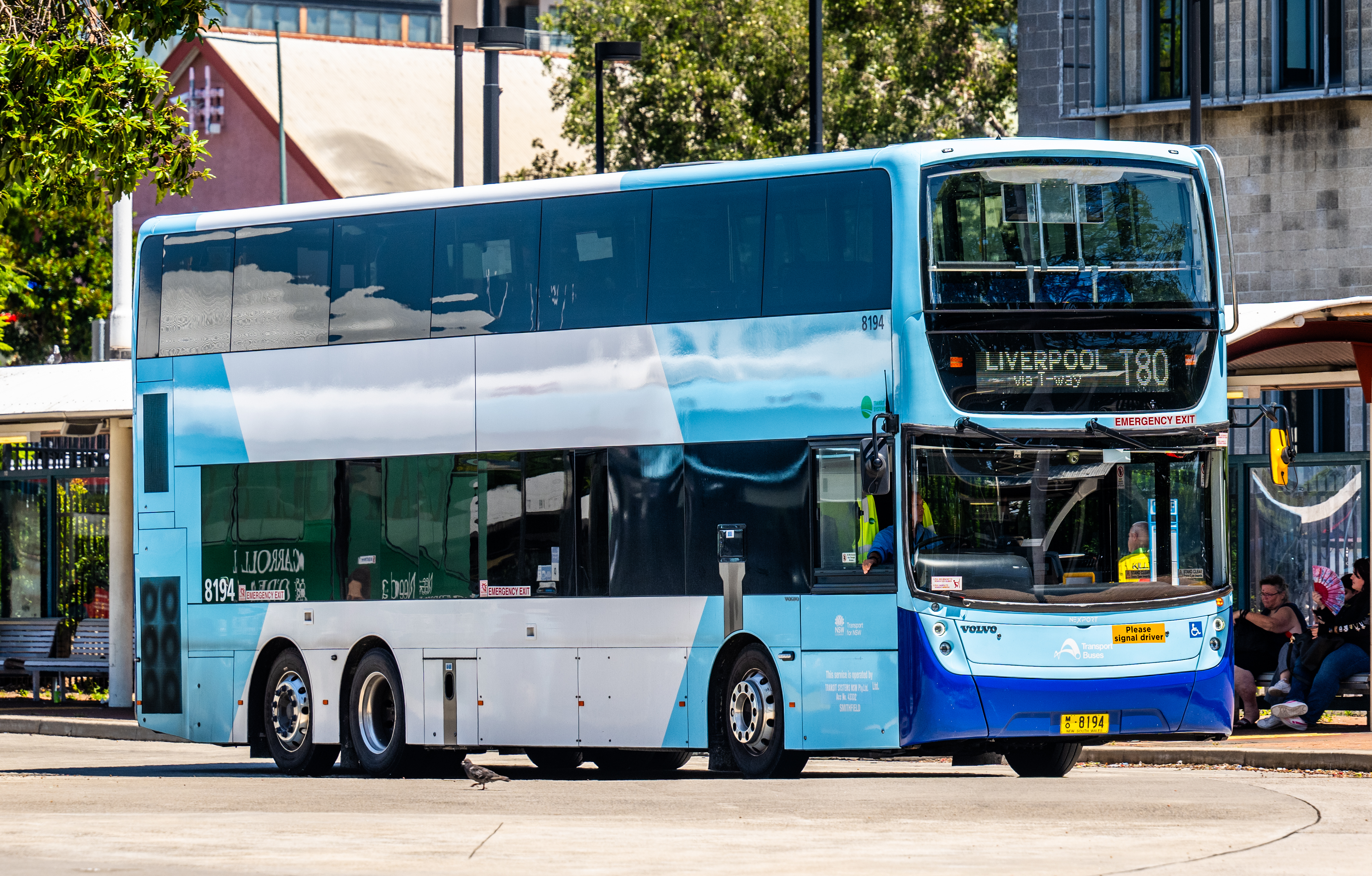
One of the three Volvo B8Ls in Australia with a Gemilang body, operated by Transit Systems NSW
