= Dennis Trident 3 =

Low-floor tri-axle double-decker bus

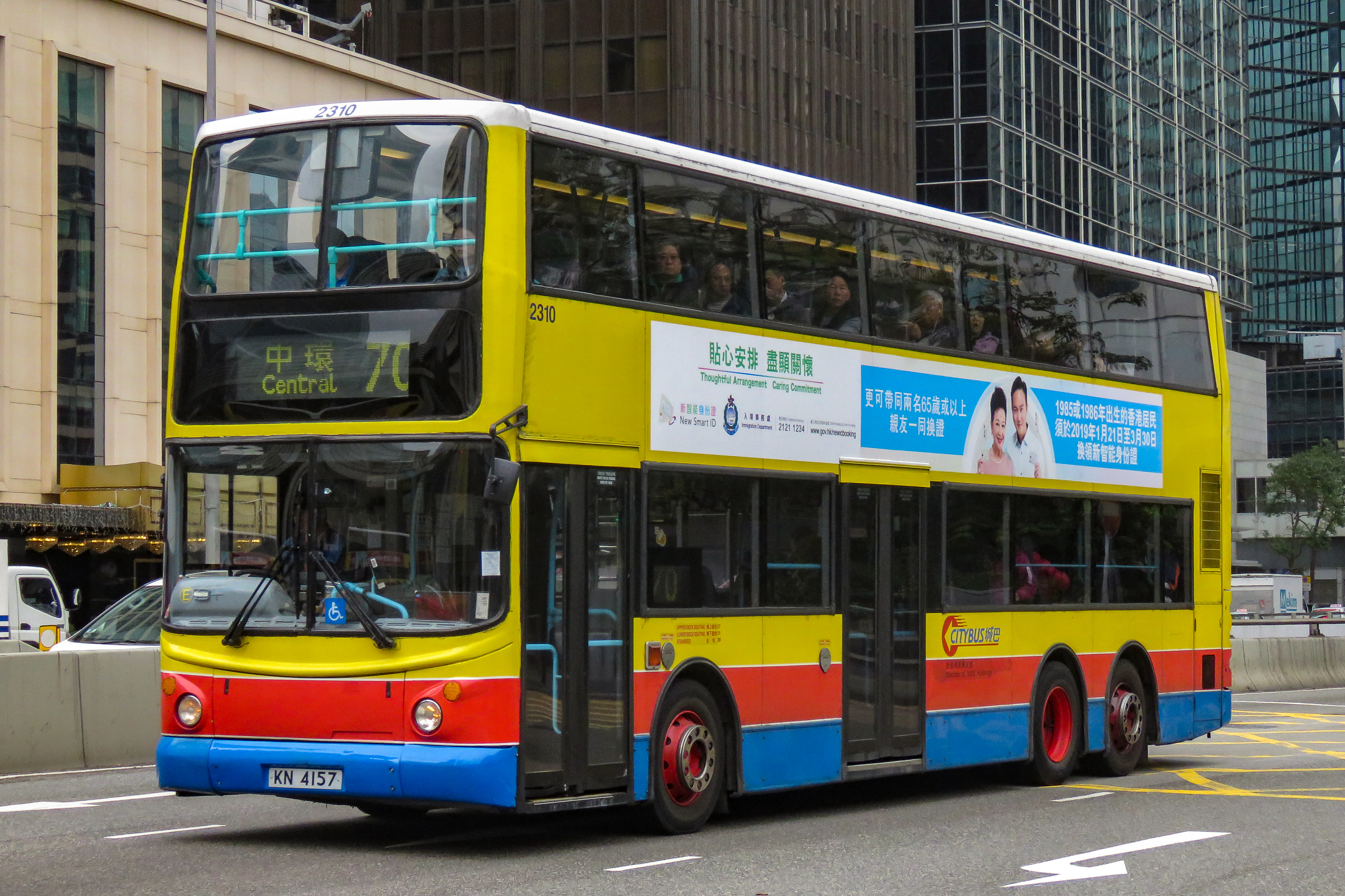
- A Citybus Trident 3 with Alexander ALX500 bodywork in 2019.

Overview
- Manufacturer: Dennis /TransBus International (badged as Dennis)
- Production: 1995–2002
- Assembly: Guildford, England

Body and chassis
- Doors: 1 or 2
- Floor type: Low floor
- Related: Dennis Lance

Powertrain
- Engine: Cummins M11-305E21 (Euro 2); Cummins ISMe335-30 (Euro 3); Cummins ISM-330 (North America)
- Power output: Cummins M11-305E21: 305hp Cummins ISMe335-30: 335hp Cummins ISM-330: 330hp
- Transmission: Voith DIWA 863.3 3-speed fully automatic (for Euro 2 units); Voith DIWA 864.3 4-speed fully automatic (for Euro 2 units); Voith DIWA 864.3E 4-speed fully automatic (for Euro 2/Euro 3 units); ZF Ecomat 5HP590 5-speed fully automatic (for Euro 2 units); ZF Ecomat 2 5HP602C originally 5-speed and modified to 6-speed fully automatic (for Euro 3 units)

Dimensions
- Length: 10.3 m, 10.6 m, 11.3 m or 12.0 m
- Width: 2.5 metres
- Height: 4.17 m or 4.4 m

Chronology
- Predecessor: Dennis Dragon
- Successor: TransBus Enviro500

Dennis Trident 3 (the 3 meaning 3-axle) (Note: The vehicle type shown on the manufacturer's plate is either "TRIDENT" or "TRIDENT 3".) (marketed as 3-axle Dennis Trident), is the first low-floor tri-axle double-decker bus chassis built by Dennis in the United Kingdom, with a large number purchased by bus companies in Hong Kong, Singapore, the United States and Canada.

== Design ==
The Trident 3 chassis was developed from Dennis Lance. It had a longitudinally mounted rear engine, with a radiator mounted on the right-hand side of the engine. An auxiliary axle was mounted behind the second axle to cope with the weight at the rear and reduce the rear overhang.

Trident 3 was available in 4 different body lengths: 10.3 m (specially designed for New World First Bus), 10.6 m, 11.3 m and 12 m. It could be fitted with Alexander ALX500 or Duple Metsec DM5000 bodywork with either a closed top or an open top.

=== Engine ===
The engines used for these double-decker buses were all manufactured by Cummins. Earlier models use the M11-305E, a 305 hp engine which complies with Euro II standards, or an ISM-330 330 hp engine for the buses delivered to North America.

The M11-305E engine was replaced by the Cummins ISMe Euro III-standard engine in 2001. A 330 hp version (the ISMe330) was used initially, but later models in Hong Kong adopted a 335 hp (ISMe335) version.

=== Gearbox ===
For original Euro 2 Cummins M11 Units, the options of gearbox included Voith DIWA 863.3/864.3/864.3E and ZF Ecomat 5HP590.

For later Euro 3 Cummins ISMe/ISM Units, the options of gearbox included Voith DIWA 864.3E and ZF Ecomat 2 5HP602C.

== The prototypes ==
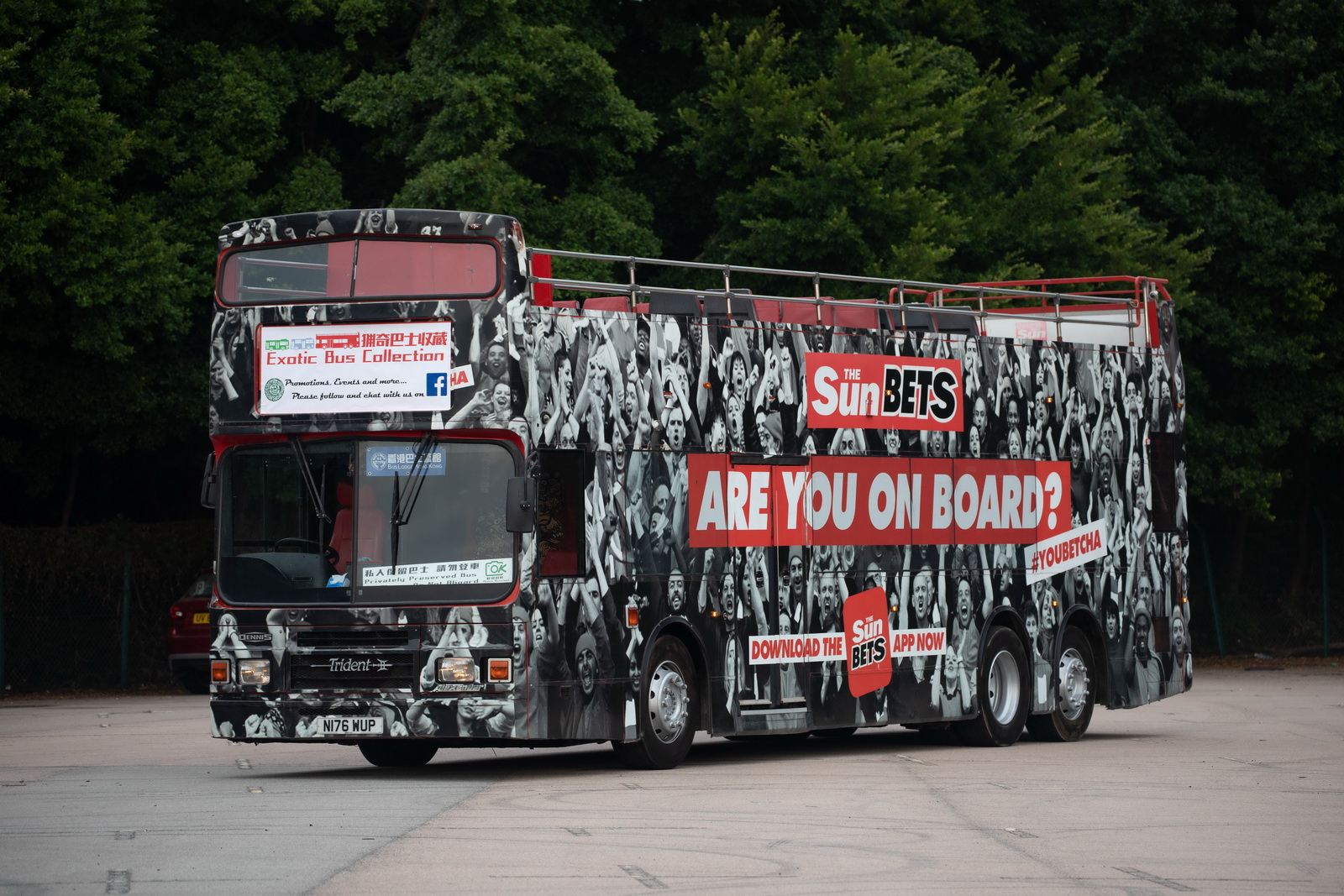
The first Trident 3 prototype with Alexander R-type front design

Six prototype Dennis Trident 3 chassis were built in 1996.

The first Trident 3 chassis was assembled in late 1996 with a Alexander body featuring an R-type front end, as the ALX500 design was not yet ready. This prototype was retained by Dennis as a development vehicle and tested extensively over eighteen weeks at the Millbrook Proving Ground in Bedfordshire, England. In 2005, the prototype was converted to open top and sold as a promotional vehicle for the British tabloid newspaper The Sun, later being sold to a buyer in Hong Kong in October 2019.

The other 5 were all delivered to Hong Kong, with two delivered to Kowloon Motor Bus and three to Citybus.

== Hong Kong ==
=== Kowloon Motor Bus and Long Win Bus ===
==== Prototypes ====
The assembly of the first Trident for Hong Kong was finished in February 1997. It has an Alexander ALX500 bodywork and had Kowloon Motor Bus (KMB) air-conditioned bus livery. However, Dennis reserved this bus for tests initially.

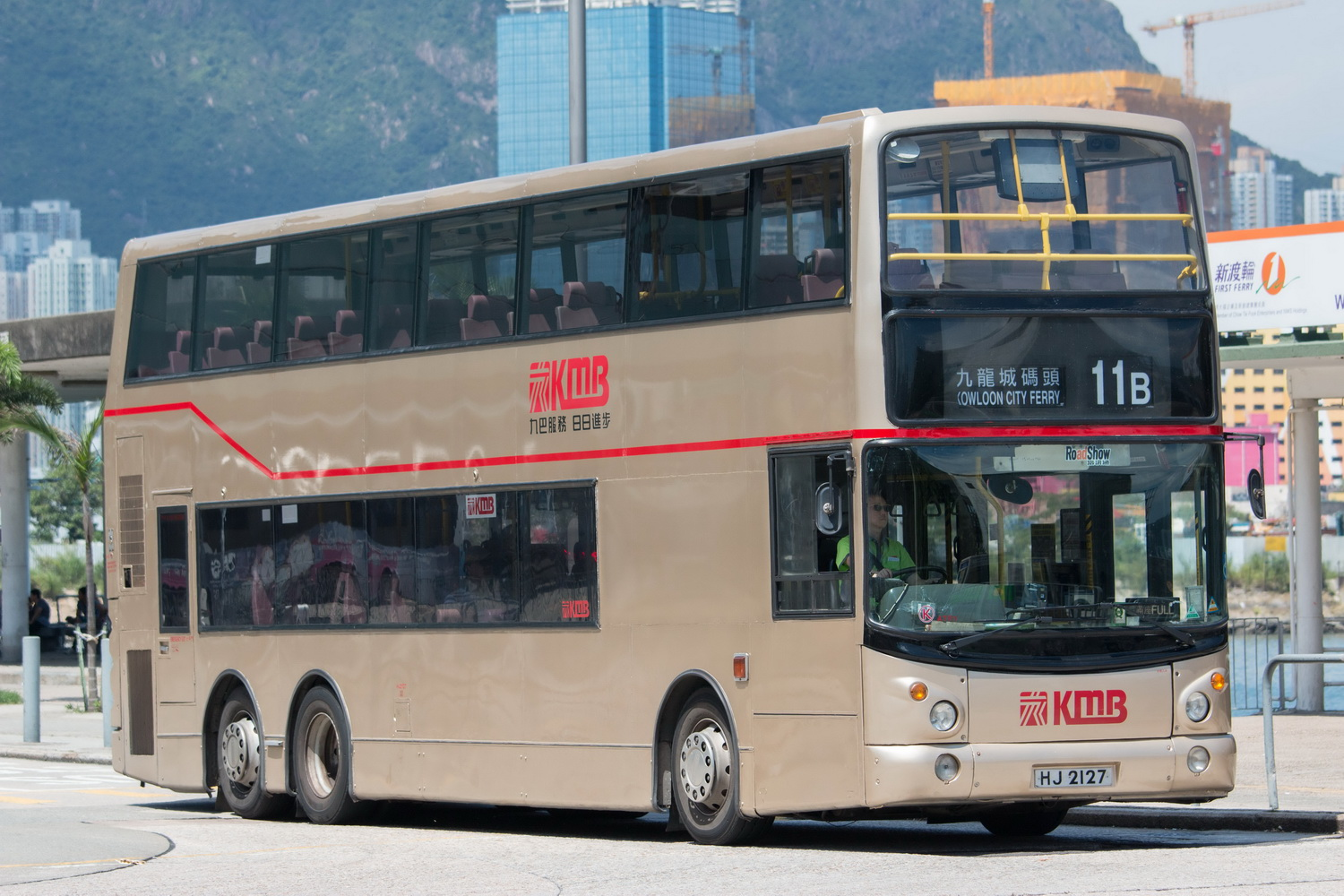
Kowloon Motor Bus Alexander ALX500 bodied Dennis Trident 3 demonstrator (ATR1) built in May 1997, in July 2015

The second prototype was finished and delivered to Hong Kong in May 1997, also having an ALX500 body and the KMB air-conditioned bus livery. When it arrived in Hong Kong, it was repainted with a golden colour. A red line indicating the floor of bus compartment was added, with people-like figures (designed with computers) situated just above the red line. This decoration work was for the purpose of showing that this bus is a "Super-low-floor" bus, which has better accessibility for passengers. The bus was assigned for several open activities for promotion before getting licensed in September 1997. It entered service two months later and had been in service on route 1A before being reallocated in 2005.

KMB adopted the class code ATR for Trident 3, which would also be used to number the production models.

The first prototype stayed in the United Kingdom for further testing, some of its body parts were damaged during the testing and were replaced with production body parts. It was delivered to Hong Kong later and entered service in 1999, with fleet number ATR101, meaning it is the 101st Trident 3 registered under KMB.

==== First batch (1997 to 1999) ====
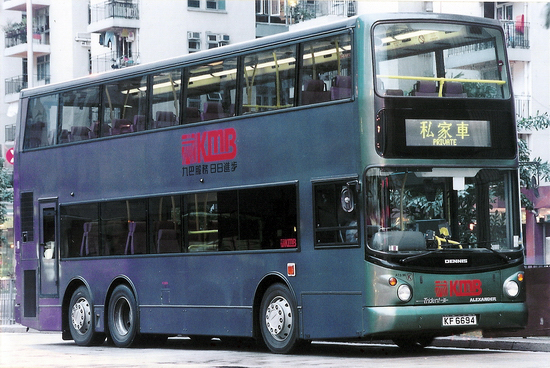
KMB's 10.6 m Trident 3 (ATS96) with Alexander ALX500 body.

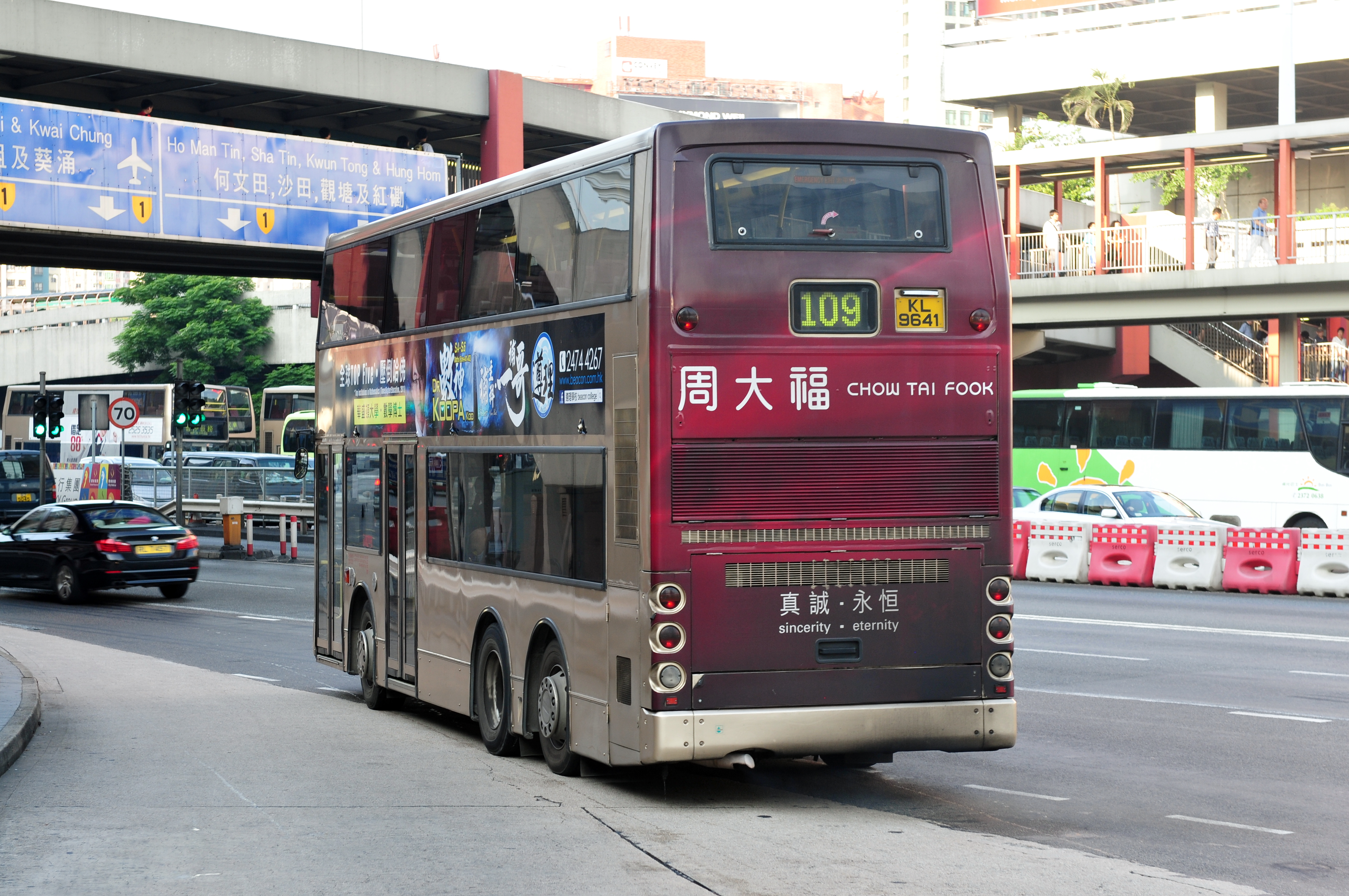
A rear view of a KMB Trident 3 with Alexander ALX500 body.

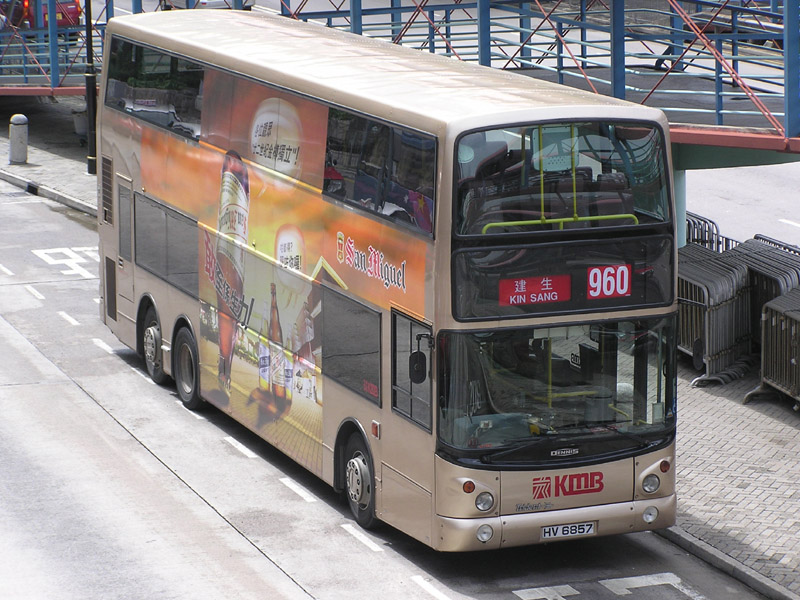
A Kowloon Motor Bus Alexander ALX500 bodied Dennis Trident 3 in April 2005

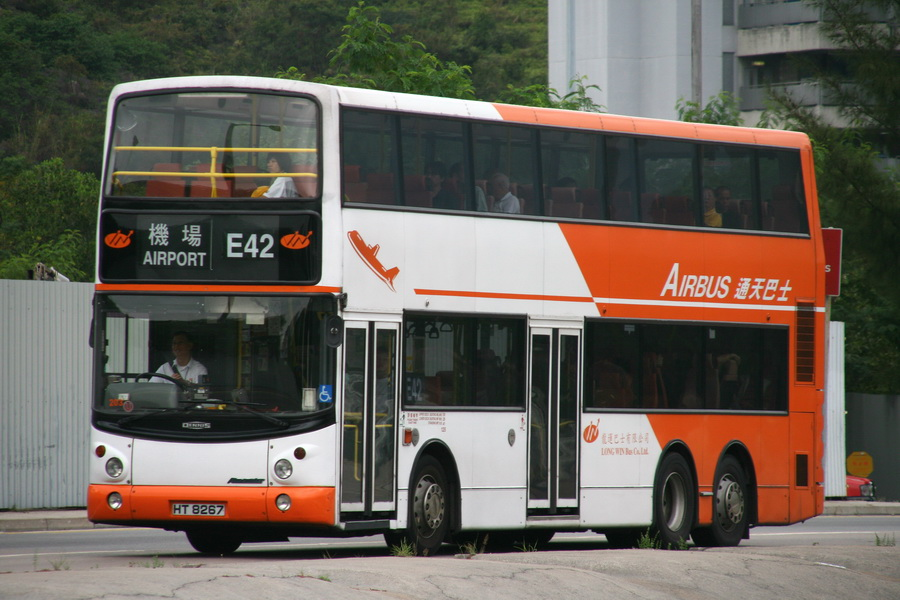
Long Win Bus Alexander ALX500 bodied Dennis Trident 3 in November 2009

For the first batch, KMB purchased 185 Tridents for its local services, and another 150 for the new Hong Kong International Airport services under the name of Long Win Bus.

All 336 buses of this batch are 12 metres in length. The KMB batch is assorted with Alexander and Duple Metsec bodies, while the entire Long Win batch is Alexander-bodied. Furthermore, 25 of the Long Win Tridents were built with coach standard, and are used for express services into the airport.

The Long Win batch entered service first between 1997 and 1998, followed by the KMB batch from September 1998 to 1999.

KMB adopted the code ATR for its own Tridents, and assigned the code LW for the Long Win batch with ordinary standard (The numbering of LW class starts from 11, continuing from the 10 Volvo Olympians acquired by Long Win earlier in 1997). The coaches were assigned with the fleet code LWA.

Later, Long Win has its fleet number system revised, with the ordinary Tridents getting 1xx or 2xx fleet numbers, while the "coaches" got 5xx fleet numbers.

==== Further purchase (1999 to 2001) ====
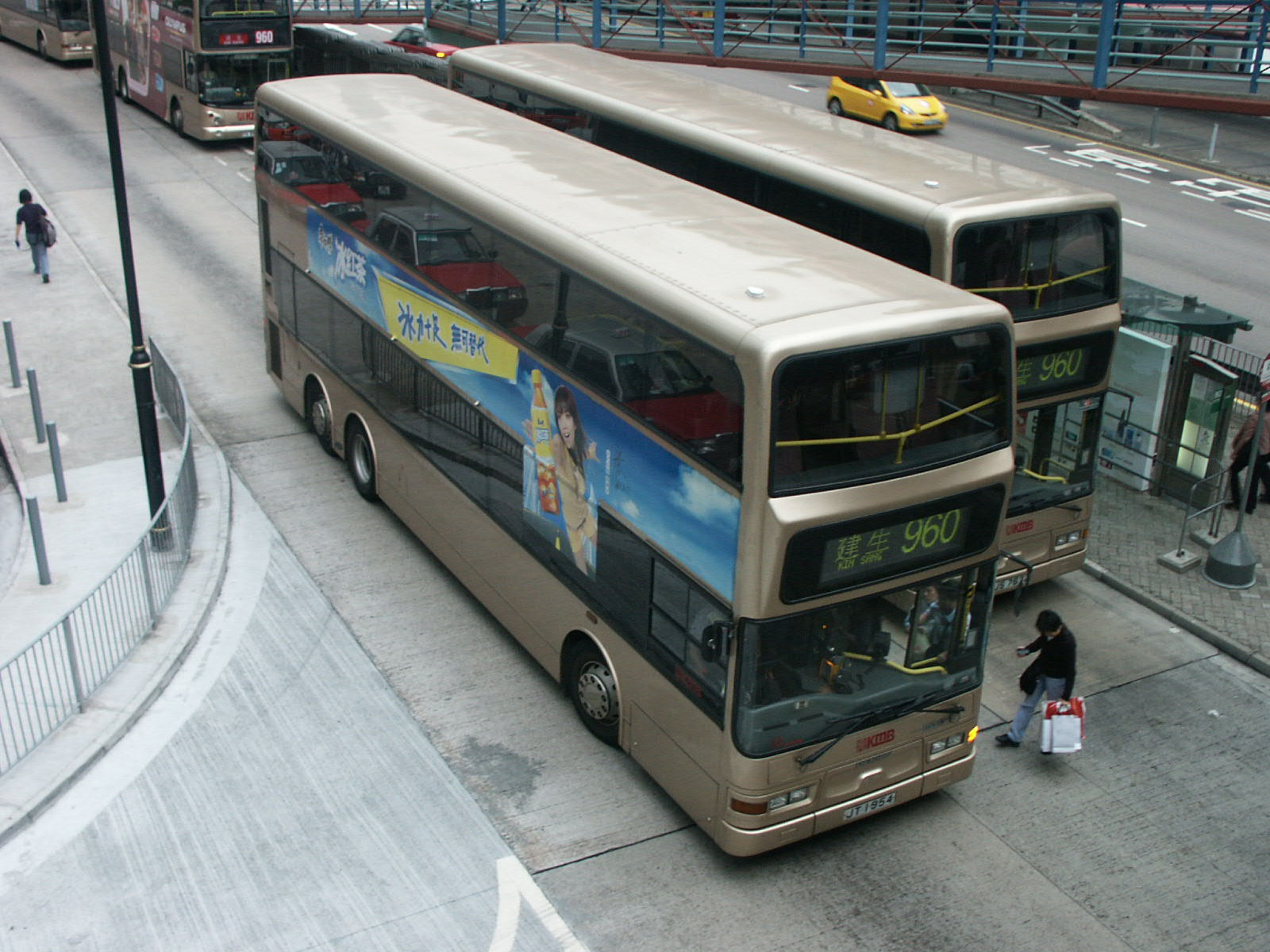
Several KMB Trident 3's at Wan Chai Ferry Pier, Hong Kong.

The next batch of Tridents for KMB consists of 160 Duple Metsec DM5000-bodied productions.

The first 50 of them have a length of 10.6 metres (the code ATS was being assigned for them), and entered service between late 1999 and 2000. These buses are the last batch of KMB buses fitted with plastic route number and destination displays. All buses were retired in December 2017.

The next 110 of them are again 12 metres in length and fitted with electronic route displays (This became the standard of all future buses bought by KMB). All buses were retired in August 2018, with the last ones, [Fleet numbers ATR286 (JU2164) and ATR298 (JU6365)] were de-registered.

Another 50 Alexander-bodied 10.6 m Tridents entered the KMB fleet in 2001. These Tridents' Alexander bodies were of a modified model, and all of them have electronic route displays. Two of them were experimentally fitted with Cummins ISMe Euro III standard engines and have special livery.

==== Last batch (2002 to 2003) ====
The last batch for KMB consists of 150 Alexander-bodied Tridents. These buses are fitted with electronic displays and Cummins ISMe Euro III standard engines and have their bodies similar to the last 10.6-metre batch.

50 of the Tridents are 10.6 metres long, while the other 100 are 12 metres long. However, the order of 12 metres long Tridents was revised later, and only 80 of them were ordered finally. The remaining 20 became the later TransBus Enviro500. All buses were retired in October 2020.

==== Transfers ====
It was soon found that Long Win did not get expected ridership and was in excess of buses, so from 1999, 20 Tridents of Long Win were leased to KMB. 14 of them were officially acquired by KMB in December 2002, and the rest were returned to Long Win by 2005.

From December 2009 to 2015, Long Win had mass transferred 103 of the first batch of buses to KMB (ATR393 – ATR495).

==== Withdrawals ====
Both KMB and Long Win have some of their Tridents withdrawn prematurely due to fire. Long Win lost one [Fleet number 197 (HT7970)] in July 1999 and got a replacement a year later. This replacement was Duple Metsec-bodied and with electronic displays, and received the fleet number 301 (JV7629).

One KMB Alexander-bodied Trident [Fleet number ATR6 (HV6943)] was destroyed by fire accidentally on 27 November 2002. The accident was caused by the leakage of flammable liquid brought by a passenger into the engine compartment. The bus was officially written off in the following year.

In July 2008, two Duple Metsec-bodied KMB's 12-metre Tridents [Fleet number ATR54 (HX7649) and ATR195 (JM8323)], one of KMB's Alexander-bodied 12-metre Trident (ex-Long Win vehicle) [Fleet number ATR358 (HR8939)] and one Duple Metsec-bodied 10.6-metre Trident [Fleet number ATS36 (JK6249)] were written off after being burnt out in KMB's depot in Tin Shui Wai on 31 March 2008.

Starting from August 2015, KMB withdrew the first Dennis Trident 3s out of service. The last Trident 3 and 12-metre Alexander ALX500 [Fleet number ATR392 (KZ2356)] was withdrawn on 24 April 2021, which means that there are no more Dennis Trident 3s and 12-metre Alexander ALX500s in Hong Kong.

=== Citybus ===
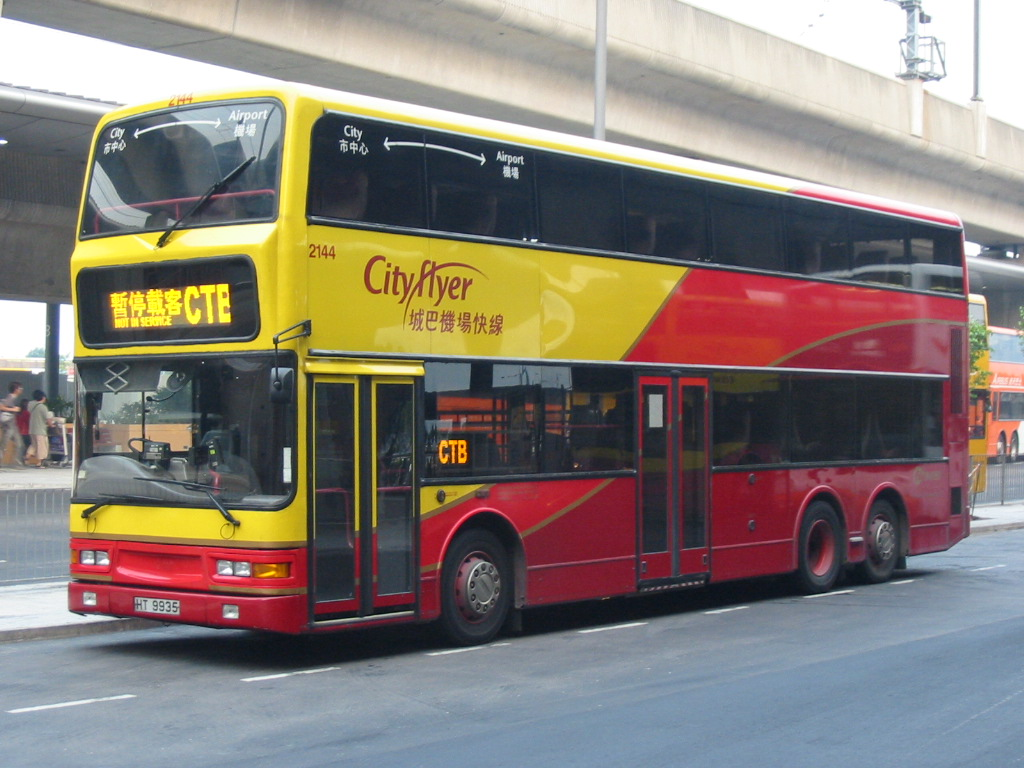
Citybus's 12 m Trident 3 (2144) for Cityflyer routes.

Citybus's Trident fleet was not the largest, but often considered with greatest variety.

==== Prototypes ====
After KMB's first Trident was introduced, Citybus also had its prototype Tridents. The first prototype for Citybus was fleet-numbered as 2100. Having a Duple Metsec DM5000 body with coach specifications, it was introduced in November 1997.

The second and third prototypes were with ordinary bus specifications, and got their licences one month after the first. The second prototype was fitted with Alexander ALX500 bodywork while the third was fitted with a Duple Metsec DM5000 body. They got fleet numbers 2200 and 2201 respectively, in order to distinguish from the "coach" standard model.

==== Production batch ====
The production batches of Citybus Tridents entered service between 1997 and 1999.

For the coach standard branch, 11 Alexander-bodied Tridents entered service in late 1997, followed by 50 Duple Metsec-bodied examples. Numbered after the first prototype, their fleet numbers were 21-prefixed. All these buses were used for "Cityflyer" express services into Airport, although the Alexander-bodied frames are often substituted for semi-coaches described below. Fleet numbers 2101 and 2102 were later repainted in a special livery and reserved for route E22A.

The first batch of 22-prefixed production Tridents are often considered as "semi-coaches", as they have higher seat standards. A total of 60 semi-coaches entered service in 1998 to 1999 (although one of them stayed in Britain until its final delivery in 2000), while the following 40 (The last two were essentially 23-prefixed) were considered as ordinary standard buses.

Citybus also purchased the first 10.6 m Trident 3 built by Dennis, which has Duple Metsec semi-coach body. It was introduced in 1999 with fleet number 2700. This bus was retired on 27 April 2017.

==== Later purchases ====
In 2003, Citybus acquired 9 buses from NWFB and numbered them as 2302 to 2310, following its own production batch. They were fitted with luggage racks in the lower deck in 2007 to facilitate the introduction of new cross-border routes B3 and B3X from Tuen Mun via the Hong Kong–Shenzhen Western Corridor.

==== Withdrawal ====
Eleven Citybus Dennis Trident 3 buses were withdrawn due to fire and traffic accidents between the years 2010 and 2015, and was replaced by Alexander Dennis Enviro500s. The coach standard buses began withdrawal when the Alexander Dennis Enviro500 MMC was introduced in June 2013 and 10 were sold to New Lantao Bus and Kwoon Chong Motors for usage on Lantau Island due to the requests of double deckers.

The remaining semi-coach and ordinary standard buses started retirement in 2014, and the last were retired in 2018. The transferred batch (2302-2310) were the last to be withdrawn. The last two (2309, 2310) were retired in April 2019.

=== New World First Bus ===
It was rumoured that China Motor Bus (CMB) had thought about purchasing ten Tridents in late 1996, but due to unpredictable delivery time Condors were bought instead. When New World First Bus won China Motor Bus's franchise in early 1998, plan was put forward of buying Tridents. Between 1999 and 2015, Tridents had accounted for over 50% of buses in NWFB's fleet. All of them have been fully withdrawn by 2020.

==== First batch (1998–1999) ====
NWFB's 12 m Trident 3 (3038) with Duple Metsec bodywork.

Three batches of NWFB Tridents are 12 metres in length, including the first batch of 160 Alexander-bodied Tridents and 42 Duple Metsec-bodied Tridents, both entering service starting from late 1998. NWFB assigned two different number schemes for these Tridents according to their bodywork (1001 onwards for Alexander bodied ones, and 3001 onwards for Duple bodied ones).

==== Second batch: Shorter variations (1999–2000) ====
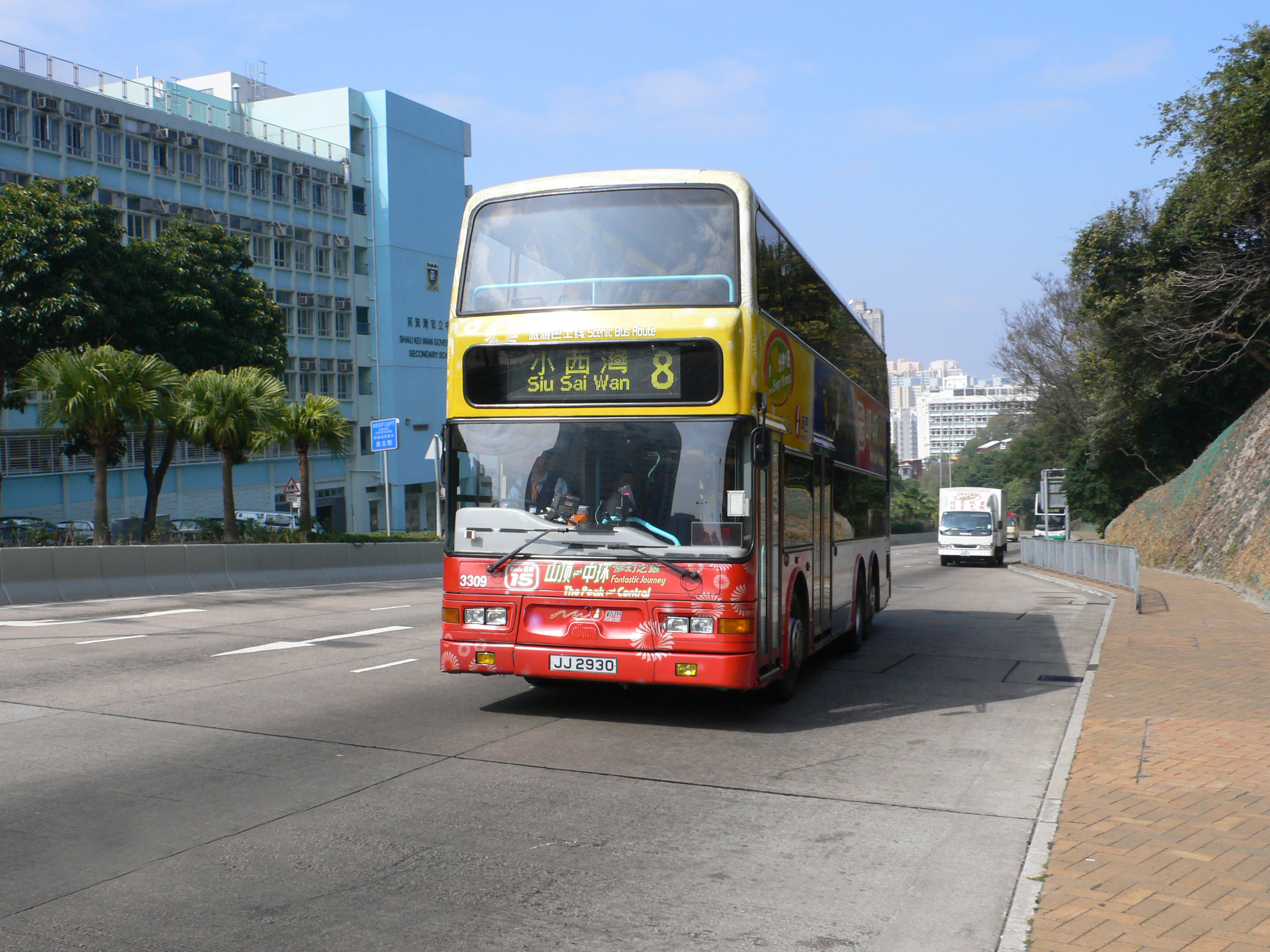
NWFB's 10.3 m Trident 3 (3309) with Duple Metsec bodywork.

The second NWFB batch entered service throughout 1999 as well as early 2000.

NWFB adopted a policy of purchasing shorter variations of Tridents in its second batch. 50 buses of this batch were still 12 metres in length (30 with Alexander ALX500 bodywork, and 20 with Duple Metsec bodies), but all others have a shorter length.

Thirty 11.3-metre Tridents (Fleet Numbers 1401–1430) entered service in 1999, along with sixty-two 10.6-metre ones (Fleet numbers 1601–1662). All these 92 buses were with Alexander ALX500 bodywork, and quickly replaced the old buses inherited from CMB.

A slightly later batch of 40 Tridents (Fleet numbers 3301–3340) were fitted with specially designed Duple Metsec bodywork. They were 10.3 m (34 ft) in length and 4.17 m (13.7 ft) in height, about a foot lower than standard models. These buses were designed for both height- and length-restrictive road conditions in the hills of Hong Kong Island, including the ones leading to The Peak. These buses' fleet numbers originally included an "L" (for Low height) at the end, but removed some years later.

==== Last batch (2000–2002) ====
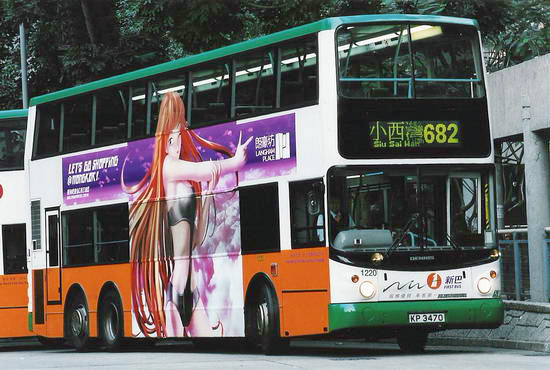
NWFB's 12 m Trident 3 (1220).

A 10.6 m Trident prototype (Fleet number 3601) was acquired by NWFB in 2000, but the next Trident batch came only two years later. 41 Tridents with Euro III standard engines entered NWFB in 2002. 21 of them were of Alexander-bodied 12 m version, while the other 20 were 10.3 m special editions. Essentially, the last special edition buses are also the last of Duple Metsec-bodied Tridents.

==== Withdrawals ====
NWFB's expansion in its early years proved to be too fast, and redundancy grew up fairly quickly. Many of its buses were sold elsewhere in order to achieve better utilisation. Nine 12-metre Tridents in the last batch (fleet number 1201–1209) were transferred to Citybus in 2003, only one year after their entry of service.

53 Tridents were transferred to the bus division of KCRC starting in 2004. All of them were shorter Alexander-bodied versions, with forty-seven 10.6 m ones and six 11.3 m ones.

NWFB has withdrawn most of its Tridents in the 2010s. As of 2020, all franchised NWFB Tridents have been retired, with the last batch (1215–1219) retired in February 2020.

In the meantime, some NWFB Tridents have been transferred to Citybus' non-franchised department, including 14 10.3 m Tridents (3341-3354) and 6 Euro III 12 m Tridents (1210, 1212–1214, 1220 and 1221). 1220 was converted to an open-top bus for tourist and hiring services and the fleet number was changed to 25. 4 of the 10.3 m Tridents (3357-3360) were repurposed as Training Buses for Citybus and NWFB.

=== KCRC ===
KCRC introduced twenty-two 11.3 m Tridents (601–622) in 2000, as an expansion of the company's bus services. They were the first Tridents to be fitted with modified Alexander ALX500 bodywork.

Between 2004 and 2005, KCRC acquired forty-seven 10.6 m Tridents from NWFB and numbered them 701–747. In August 2005, the company also acquired six 11.3 m Tridents from NWFB and numbered them 748–753. This was the largest bus acquisition of KCRC since its first purchase of buses back in 1987, and was partly because of the retirement of that particular batch of buses.

All Tridents from KCRC has been retired by 2017.

== Other overseas orders ==
=== Canada ===
In 1999, BC Transit of British Columbia, Canada, became the first North American transit agency to order low-floor double-decker transit buses, ordering 11 Dennis Tridents with Duple Metsec DM5000 bodywork assembled by Alexander. As one of them was damaged in transit, only ten of them reached BC, where they were allocated to the Victoria Regional Transit System in Victoria and entered service in 2000.

In 2002, BC Transit ordered a further 19 Dennis Tridents, also with Duple Metsec DM5000 bodywork, one of which was meant to replace the Trident from the previous batch damaged in transit. The first 16 vehicles were allocated to Victoria from the outset, while the last three were originally allocated to Kelowna Regional Transit System based in Kelowna before later being transferred to Victoria in 2009. One of these was taken on a demonstration roadtrip by TransBus across Canada in May 2002 before delivery to Kelowna, initially entering service with GO Transit in Ontario on services between the York Region and Toronto, before being demonstrated with Winnipeg Transit in Manitoba, Saskatoon Transit in Saskatchewan and the Edmonton Transit System in Alberta. BC Transit was the only North American operator to order transit-type Trident 3s before the model was discontinued and replaced with the Enviro500.

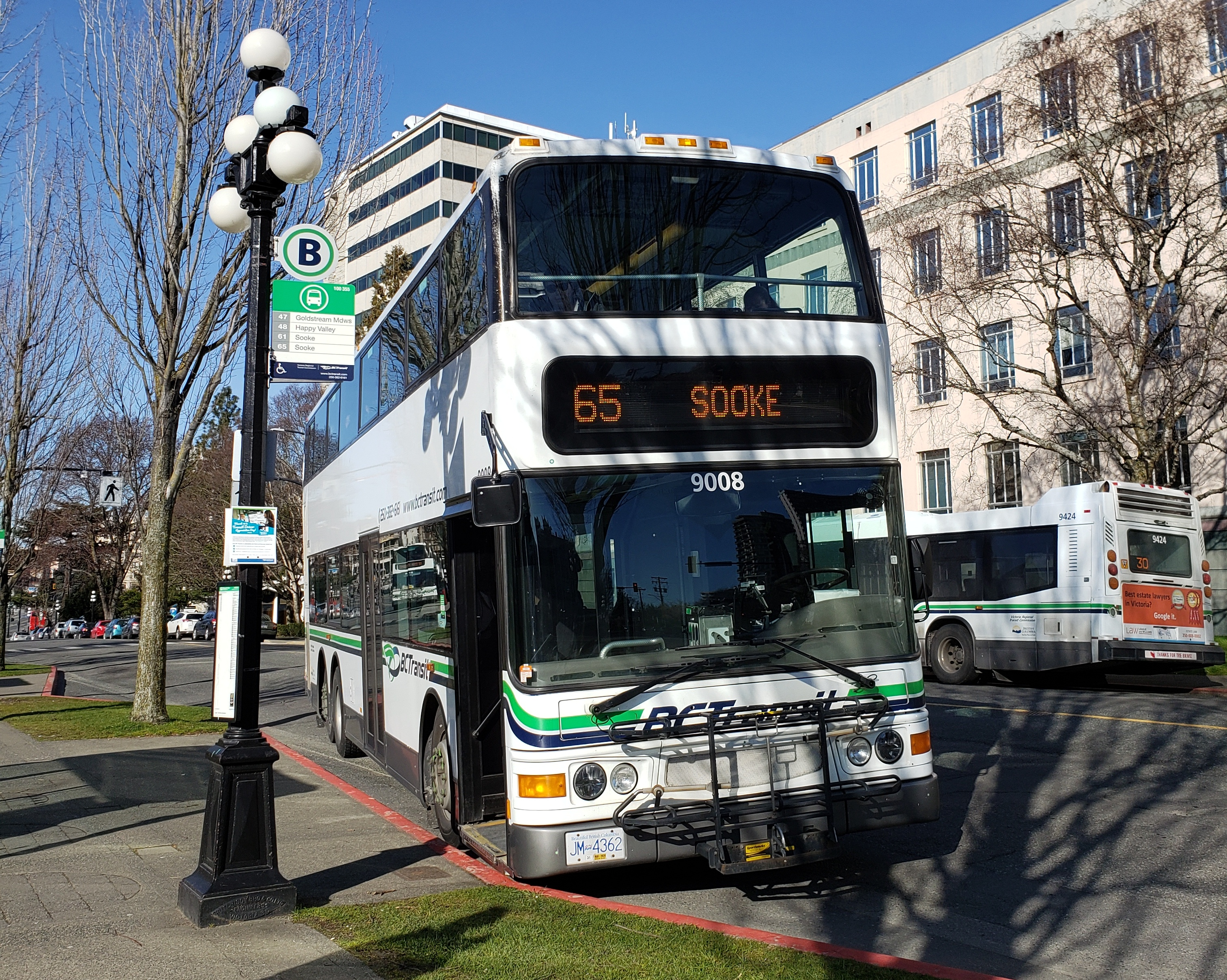
A BC Transit Dennis Trident 3 from the 2000 batch.

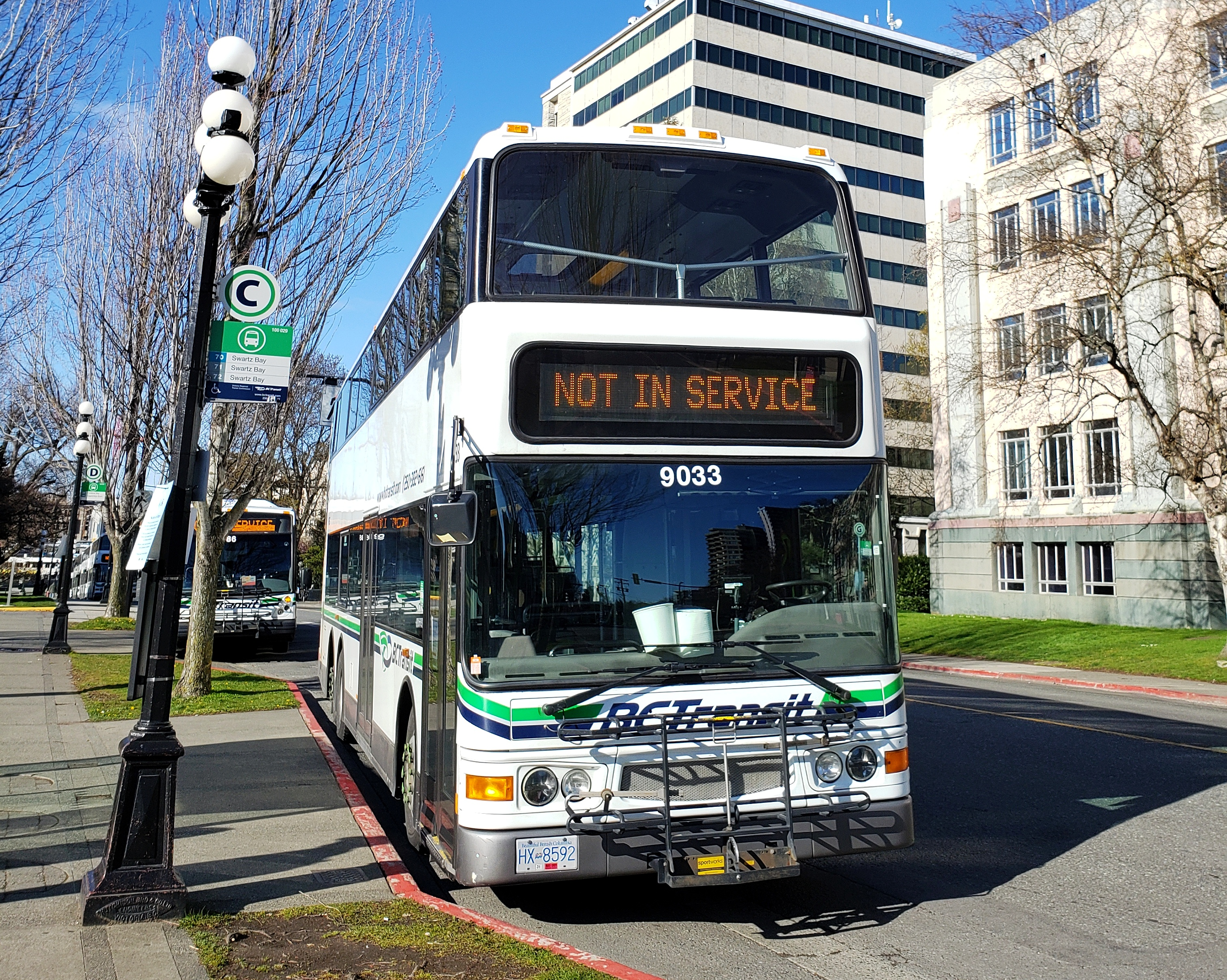
A BC Transit Dennis Trident 3 from the 2002 batch.

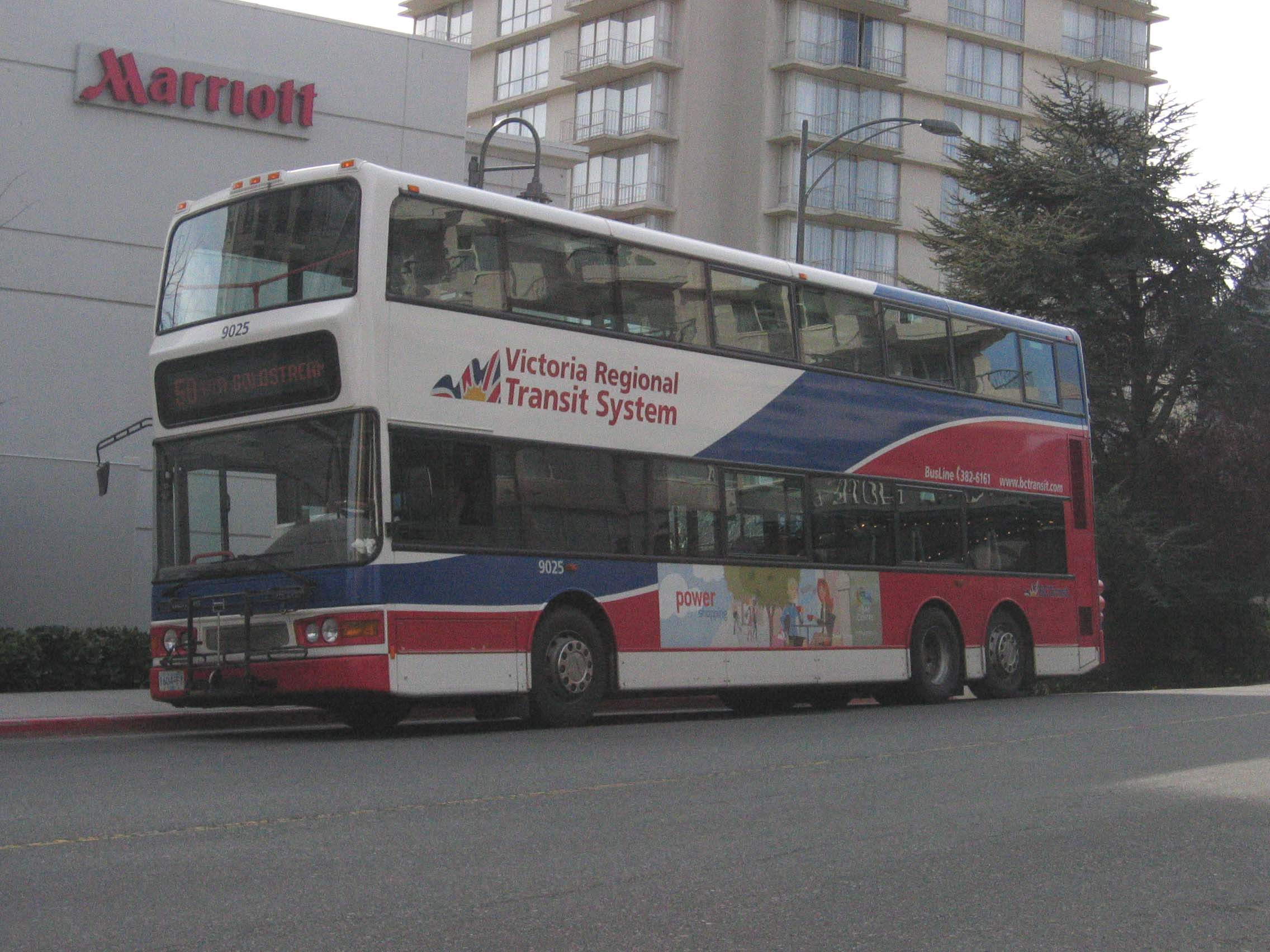
A Victoria Regional Transit System Dennis Trident 3.

=== Singapore ===
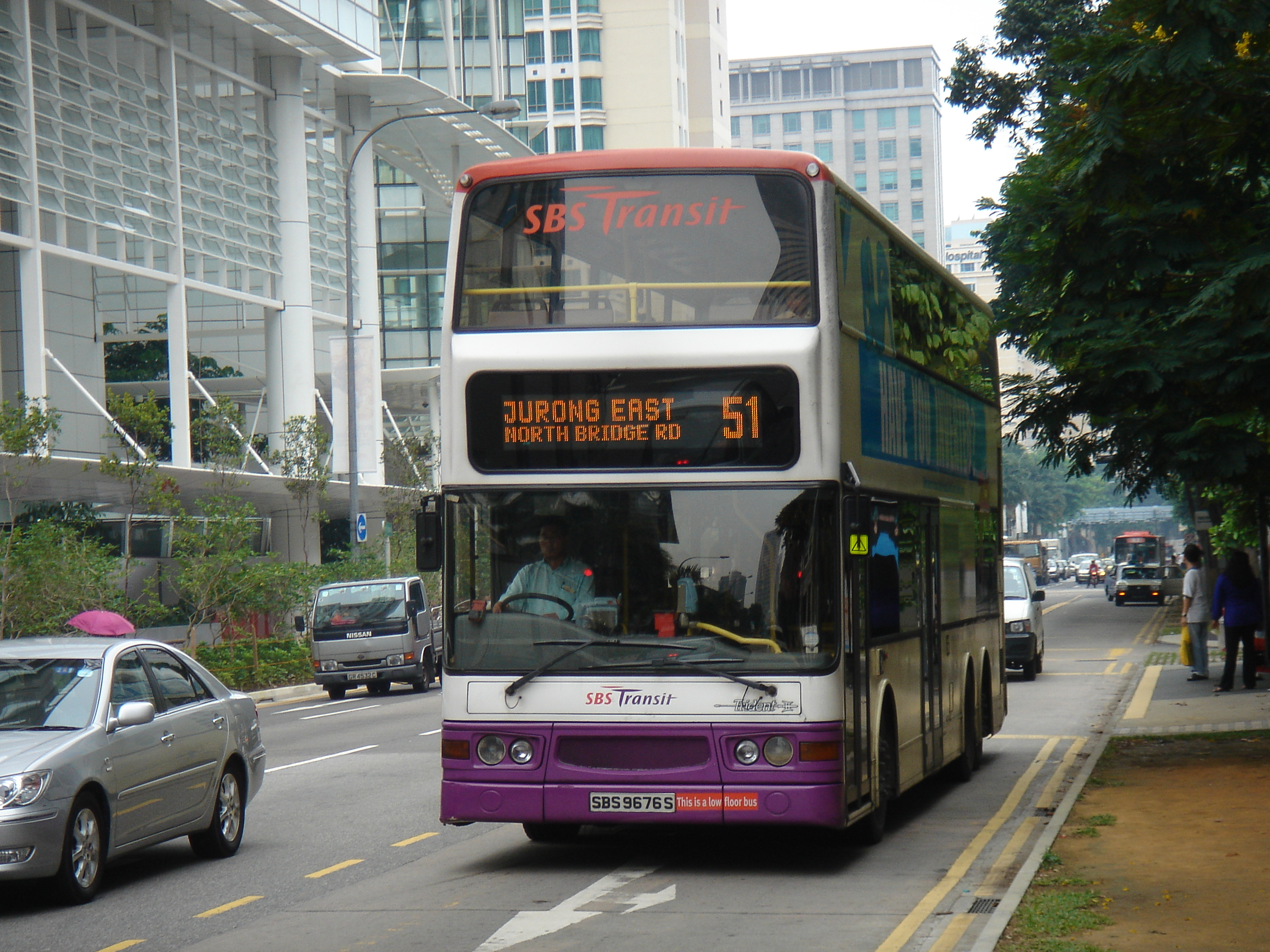
SBS Transit Duple Metsec DM5000 bodied Trident 3 outside the National Library, Singapore in June 2005

In 1998, Singapore Bus Services ordered 20 12 m (39 ft) Dennis Trident 3s with Duple Metsec DM5000 bodywork, which were Singapore's first low-floor double-decker buses. They were powered by Cummins M11-305E Euro II engines and fitted with Voith DIWA 863.3 three-speed automatic transmissions. However, due to a large volume of Trident 3 orders from Hong Kong, these buses only entered service in July 2001, being allocated to Hougang bus depot throughout their service life. All 20 Trident 3s were withdrawn by SBS Transit in August 2018 and were later scrapped, being replaced by MAN A95s with Gemilang Mark 4 bodies.

=== United States ===
Coach USA of the United States introduced 30 Trident 3s for its Gray Line sightseeing services. These were equipped with open-top Duple Metsec bodywork assembled by Alexander. These were followed by a further 10 buses with the same specifications. They were all entered service in 2001 and allocated to Twin America LLC (New York City – Gray Line/City Sightseeing) and Chicago (Coach USA).

== Further development ==
In 2002, the Trident 3 chassis was modified and then introduced as a complete bus, which was known as TransBus Enviro500.

No more Trident 3 chassis were known to be built after 2002.

== See also ==
- List of buses
- Dennis Trident 2, a 2-axle, transverse-engined Dennis Trident mainly built for the UK market

Competitors:

- MAN 24.310 HOCLNR-NL
- Neoplan Centroliner
- Scania K94UB
- Volvo Super Olympian
