= Cityflyer (bus service) =

Airport bus service provided by Citybus, Hong Kong

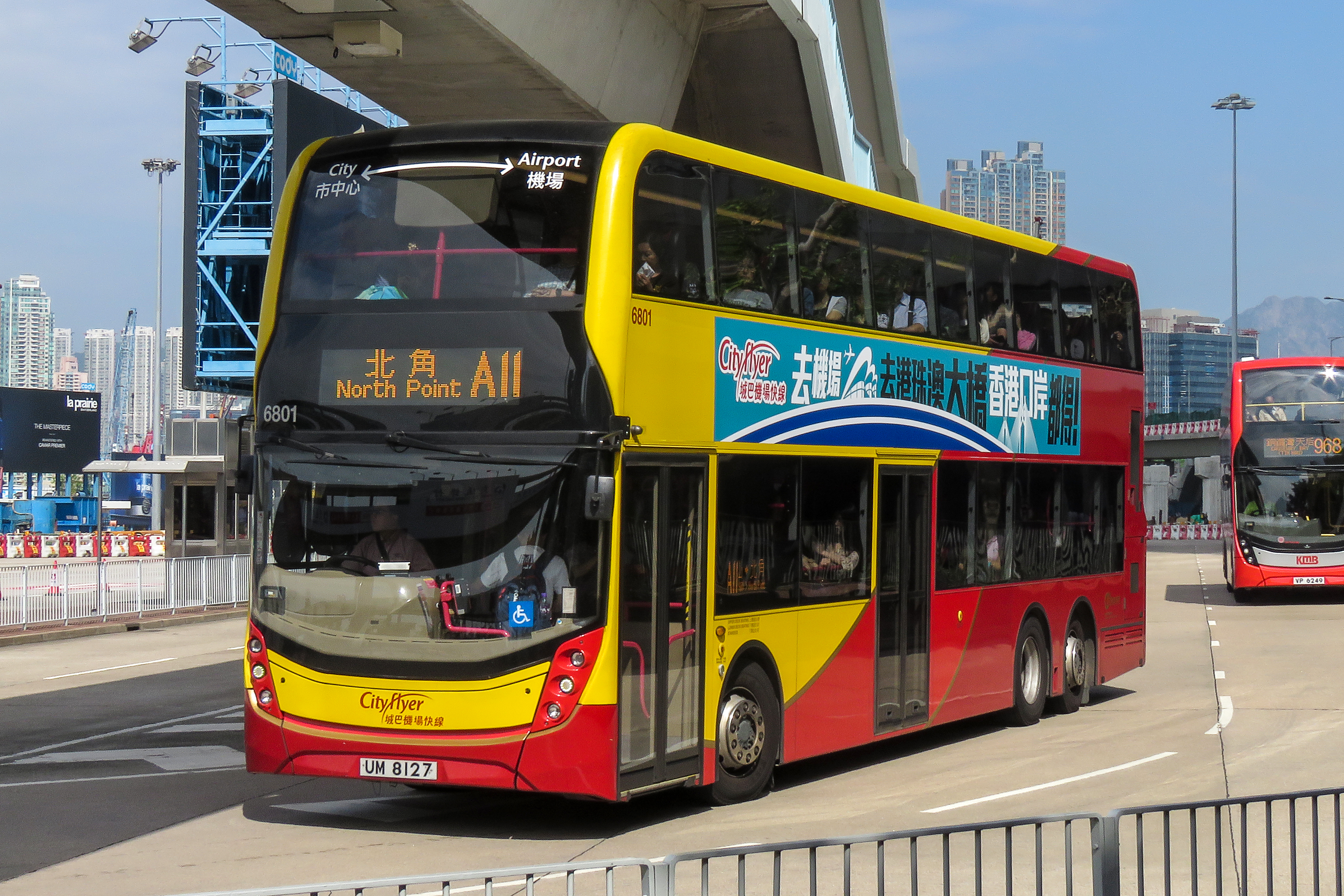
- A 12.8m Enviro500 MMC on route A11
- Service type: Bus services
- Alliance: Citybus, New World First Bus

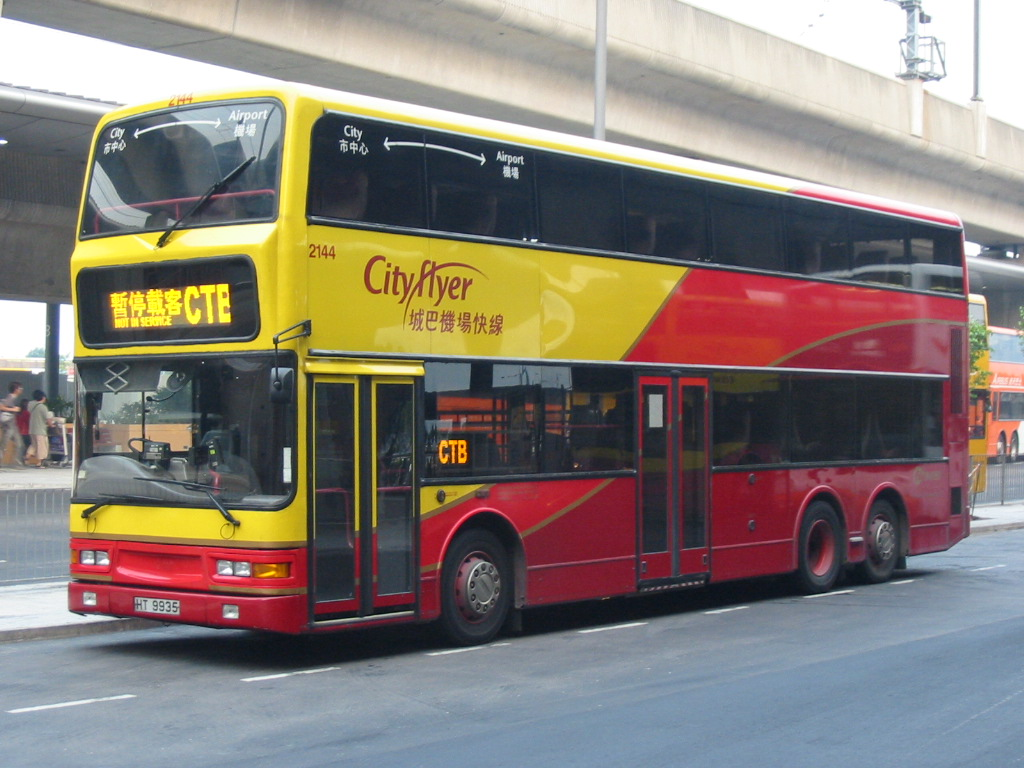
A Duple Metsec DM5000-bodied Dennis Trident 3 Cityflyer bus

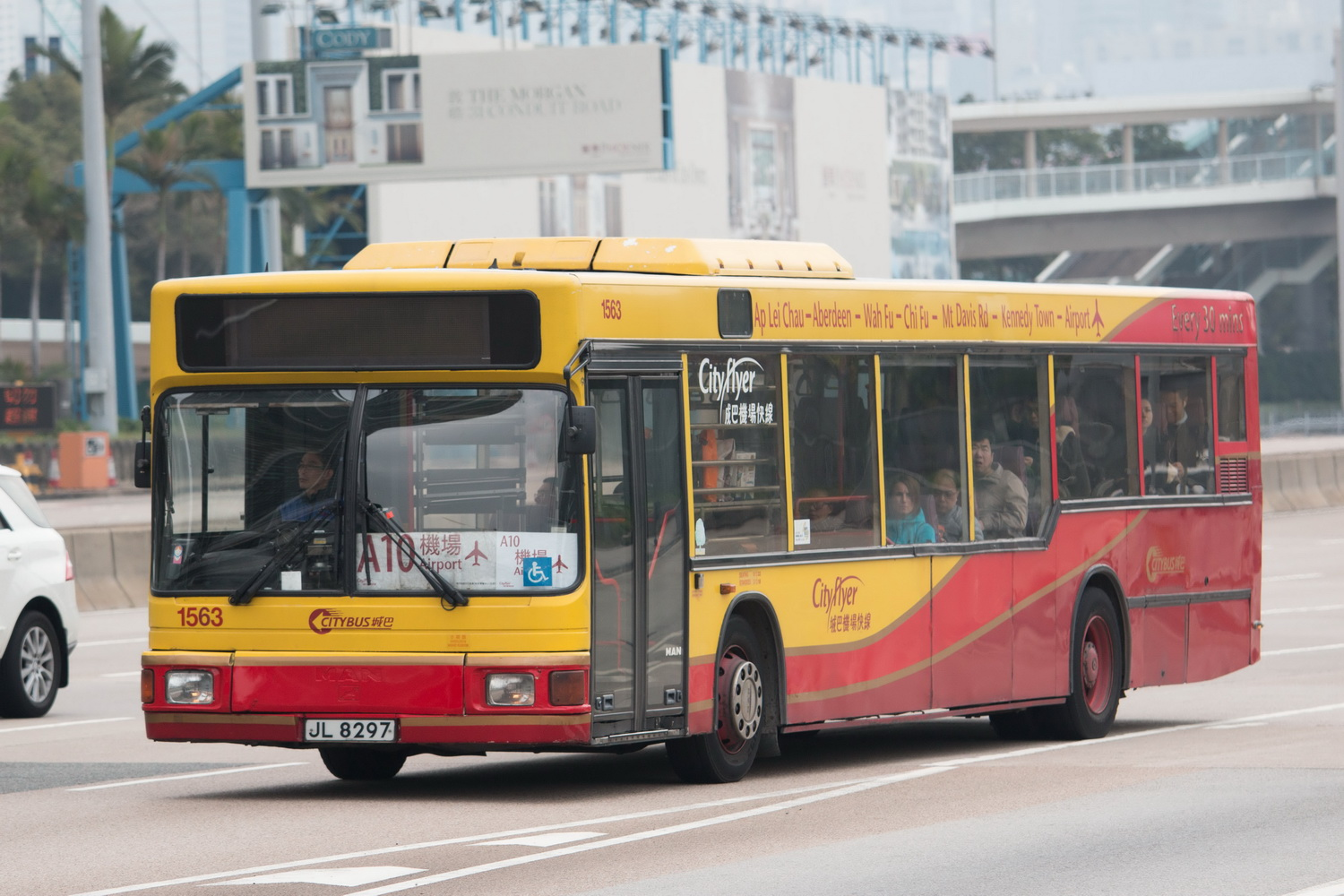
A MAN NL262 R Cityflyer bus

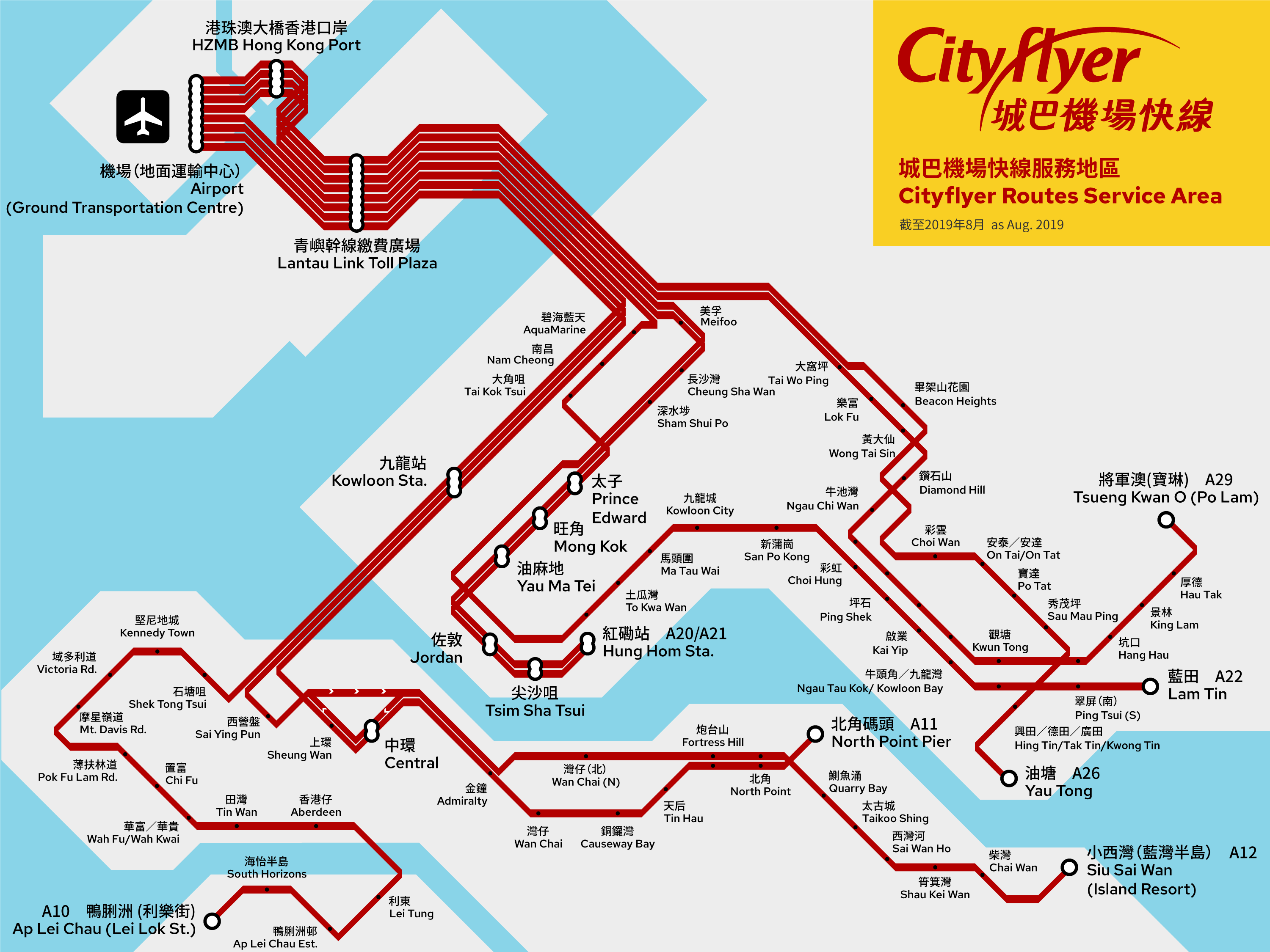
Route map of Cityflyer airport services

Cityflyer is an airport coach service to Hong Kong International Airport and Hong Kong-Zhuhai-Macau Bridge provided by Citybus. The service was started during the opening of the Hong Kong International Airport in 1998.

== Fleet ==
At the time of the opening of Hong Kong International Airport in 1998, the fleet consisted of 62 Dennis Trident 3 double decker buses (fleet numbers 2100-2161), of which 11 had Alexander ALX500 bodies and the other 51 had Duple Metsec DM5000 bodies. Ten MAN NL262/R single deckers (fleet number 1560 - 1569) were added to the fleet in 2006 for use in route A10.

Two urban-specification Alexander Dennis Enviro500s (8203-8204) joined the fleet in 2011, and were repainted with Cityflyer livery but retained their normal seats which differ from the high backed coach seats of the other buses. They were returned to normal Citybus livery in 2013. Another three urban-specification buses (8205-8207) joined the fleet in 2012 with a modified version of the Cityflyer livery as reserves to cover for unavailable coach-specification buses, and these 3 buses moved to non-franchise fleet in 2020 for private hire or special services.

From 2013 to 2014, the Dennis Tridents were replaced by 66 new 12.0 metre Enviro500 MMC buses (8000-8065). The MAN NL262/R were withdrawn in 2016, and subsequently replaced by the 12.0 metre Enviro500 MMC. Longer 12.8 metre Enviro500 MMC (6800-6811) were ordered soon after the 12.0m order. Further orders of the 12.8m Enviro500 MMC (6812-6843) were delivered in 2017–2018 to cope with rising passenger numbers on existing routes and the added passenger flows from the Hong Kong-Zhuhai-Macao Bridge. A further batch of 28 (6844-6871) were delivered in 2019-2020. All Cityflyer routes with the exception of A10, A17, A23 and NA10 have been cleared to use the 12.8 metre (42 ft) long buses.

Currently, the fleet consists of 138 Enviro500 MMCs including 66 12m and 72 12.8m vehicles.

== Routes ==
Cityflyer operates Airport Routes A10, A11, A11R, A12, A17, A20, A21, A22, A23, A25, A26, A28 and A29, as well as overnight routes NA10, NA11, NA12, NA20, NA21 and NA29. The Cityflyer service is an indirect rival to the Long Win Bus service provided by Kowloon Motor Bus, which operates in the New Territories (excluding Sai Kung).

On 28 November 2005, the Transport Department (TD) of Hong Kong invited tenders for new airport route plying between Hong Kong Southern District and Airport via Mount Davis Road and Kennedy Town. On 23 January 2006, the Transport Department announced that Citybus had won the tender, with route number A10, the fare of which was set as HK$48, surpassing the A12 as the most expensive franchised bus route in Hong Kong. The service on the new route commenced on 26 March 2006. Ten MAN NL262/R single deckers (fleet number 1560 - 1569) were upgraded to Cityflyer standard, including luggage racks and 33 seats (the same as the double deckers), for use on the new route. This was the only Cityflyer route operated predominantly by single deckers. In April 2016, the last of the MAN NL262s were retired, and their place filled by the 12 metre Enviro500 MMC double deckers.

=== Routes ===
| Route | Terminals | | | Notes & Remarks |
|---|---|---|---|---|
| A10 | Ap Lei Chau (Lee Lok Street) | ↔ | Airport | via Hong Kong–Zhuhai–Macao Bridge Hong Kong Port, West Point, Aberdeen |
| A11 | North Point Ferry Pier | ↔ | Airport | via Hong Kong–Zhuhai–Macao Bridge Hong Kong Port, Causeway Bay |
| A11R | Central (Star Ferry) | → | Airport | Specified day only via Hong Kong–Zhuhai–Macao Bridge Hong Kong Port |
| A12 | Siu Sai Wan (Island Resort) | ↔ | Airport | via Hong Kong–Zhuhai–Macao Bridge Hong Kong Port, North Point |
| A17 | Sham Wan | ↔ | Airport | via Hong Kong–Zhuhai–Macao Bridge Hong Kong Port, Queen's Road East, Ocean Park |
| A20 | Ho Man Tin | ↔ | Airport | via Hong Kong–Zhuhai–Macao Bridge Hong Kong Port |
| A21 | Hung Hom station | ↔ | Airport | via Hong Kong–Zhuhai–Macao Bridge Hong Kong Port, Tsim Sha Tsui, Mong Kok |
| A22 | Lam Tin station | ↔ | Airport | via Hong Kong–Zhuhai–Macao Bridge Hong Kong Port, Kwun Tong, To Kwa Wan |
| A23 | Tsz Wan Shan (North) | ↔ | Airport | via Hong Kong–Zhuhai–Macao Bridge Hong Kong Port, Wong Tai Sin, Sham Shui Po, Mei Foo |
| A25 | Kai Tak | ↔ | Airport | via Hong Kong–Zhuhai–Macao Bridge Hong Kong Port, To Kwa Wan, Tsim Sha Tsui |
| A26 | Yau Tong | ↔ | Airport | via Hong Kong–Zhuhai–Macao Bridge Hong Kong Port, Shun Lee Estate, Lok Wah Estate, Choi Ying Estate, Wong Tai Sin |
| A28 | Lohas Park | ↔ | Airport | via Hong Kong–Zhuhai–Macao Bridge Hong Kong Port, Po Tat Estate, On Tat Estate, Wong Tai Sin |
| A28X | Tseung Kwan O station | → | Airport | via Hong Kong–Zhuhai–Macao Bridge Hong Kong Port, Lohas Park |
| A29 | Tseung Kwan O (Po Lam) | ↔ | Airport | via Hong Kong–Zhuhai–Macao Bridge Hong Kong Port, Kwun Tong, Wong Tai Sin |
| NA10 | Ap Lei Chau (Lee Lok Street) | ↔ | Hong Kong–Zhuhai–Macao Bridge Hong Kong Port | Late Night Service |
| NA11 | North Point Ferry Pier | ↔ | Hong Kong–Zhuhai–Macao Bridge Hong Kong Port | Late Night service |
| NA12 | Heng Fa Chuen | ↔ | Hong Kong–Zhuhai–Macao Bridge Hong Kong Port | Late Night Service |
| NA20 | Hong Kong–Zhuhai–Macao Bridge Hong Kong Port | ↔ | Whampoa Garden | Late Night service |
| NA21 | Hong Kong–Zhuhai–Macao Bridge Hong Kong Port | ↺ | Mong Kok | Late Night service |
| NA29 | Tseung Kwan O (Po Lam) | ↔ | Hong Kong–Zhuhai–Macao Bridge Hong Kong Port | Late Night service |

== See also ==
- Citybus - owner of Cityflyer
- Kowloon Motor Bus
- Long Win Bus - rival airport bus service to Cityflyer
- Airport Express - operated by MTR Corporation Limited
- New World First Bus - mainly operates in Hong Kong Island, both Citybus and New World First Bus are owned by the same company
- List of bus routes in Hong Kong
