= CityFlyer =

CityFlyer or Cityflyer may refer to:

- BA CityFlyer, an airline subsidiary based in the United Kingdom
- CityFlyer Express, a defunct airline based in the United Kingdom
- Cityflyer (bus service), an airport coach service in Hong Kong
- CityFlyer (Thameslink), a former train service run by Thameslink
