= Alexander ALX500 =

Low-floor double-decker bus body

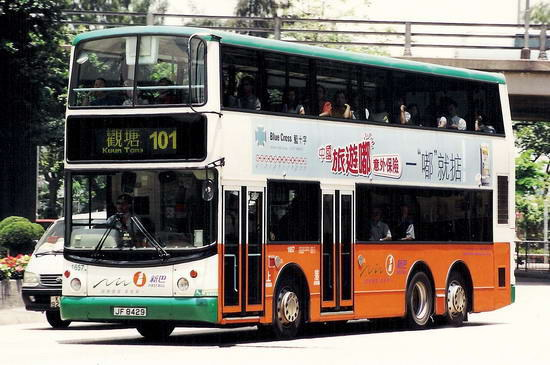
- New World First Bus Alexander ALX500 bodied Dennis Trident 3

Overview
- Manufacturer: Alexander; TransBus
- Production: 1997–2002
- Assembly: Falkirk, Scotland

Body and chassis
- Doors: 2
- Floor type: Low floor
- Chassis: Dennis Trident 3 Volvo Super Olympian
- Related: ALX100, ALX200, ALX300, ALX400

Powertrain
- Capacity: 61 to 93 seated

Dimensions
- Length: 10.6, 11.3 and 12.0 m (34 ft 9 in, 37 ft 1 in and 39 ft 4 in)
- Width: 2.5 m (8 ft 2 in)
- Height: 4.4 m (14 ft 5 in)

Chronology
- Predecessor: Alexander R-type
- Successor: TransBus Enviro500

The Alexander ALX500 (later known as the TransBus ALX500) was a low-floor double-decker bus body built by Alexander in Falkirk, Scotland between 1997 and 2002.

The Alexander ALX500 was fitted to Dennis Trident 3 and Volvo Super Olympian chassis (they could be distinguished by the design of the engine compartment: with round indicators for Dennis and square indicators for Volvo), and came in lengths of 10.6, 11.3 and 12 m (34 ft 9 in, 37 ft 1 in and 39 ft 4 in) metres (35, 37 and 40 foot). The ALX500-bodied buses were sold new to Citybus, Kowloon Motor Bus, Long Win Bus, New World First Bus and Kowloon-Canton Railway Corporation in Hong Kong. Due to the climate there, all of them were fitted with air conditioning systems, and as a result lacked a rear window on the lower deck. The extra length of the buses mean the seating capacities were near the 100 mark for the 12.0 metre variant.

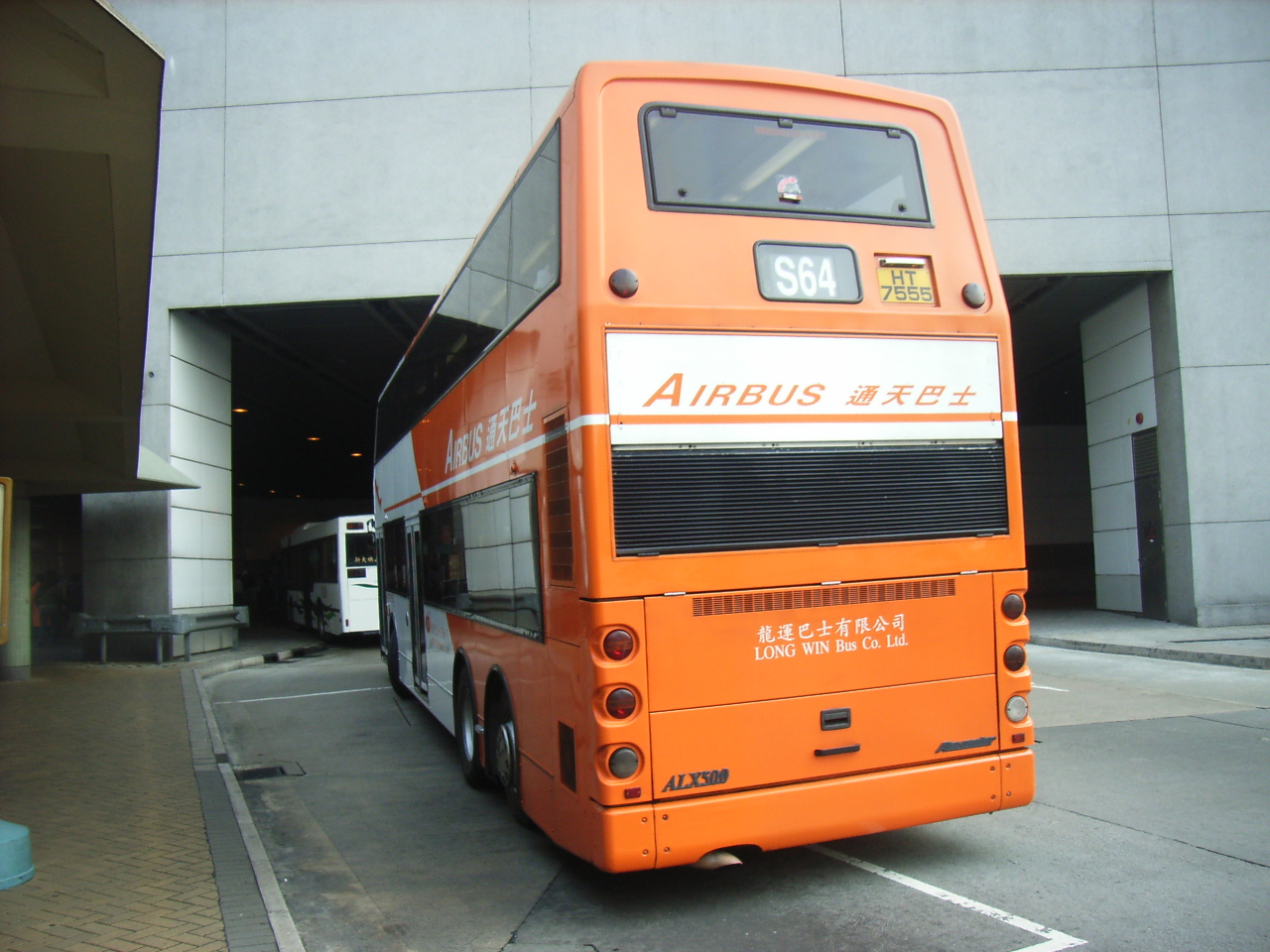
Long Win Bus Alexander ALX500-bodied Dennis Trident 3 rear.

Alexander built three prototype ALX500 bodies for prototype Trident 3 chassis. The first prototype, built in 1995, had an Alexander R-Type front fitted as a temporary measure, whilst the other two had the standard ALX range front design. Production of the ALX500 body was started later in 1997 on Trident 3 chassis, with two examples exhibited in Coach & Bus '97 in Birmingham; but there were some minor changes in appearance, for example the exit door was moved rearward (for 12.0 metre variant only). The prototype with the R-Type front was later sold to the UK newspaper The Sun, and converted to open top as a promotional vehicle. It has since been shipped to Hong Kong. Production for the ALX500 on Volvo Super Olympian chassis, started in 1998.

When TransBus International was formed in 2001, the Alexander ALX500 body replaced the standard height, right hand drive version of the Duple Metsec DM5000 body (built for the Dennis Trident 3) which was duplicated with the ALX500 design. In late 2002, the ALX500 body was superseded by the TransBus Enviro500.

All Alexander ALX500 bodied buses are progressively retired by March 2023.
