= Volvo Super Olympian =

1998 low-floor double-decker bus

Volvo B10TL Super Olympian
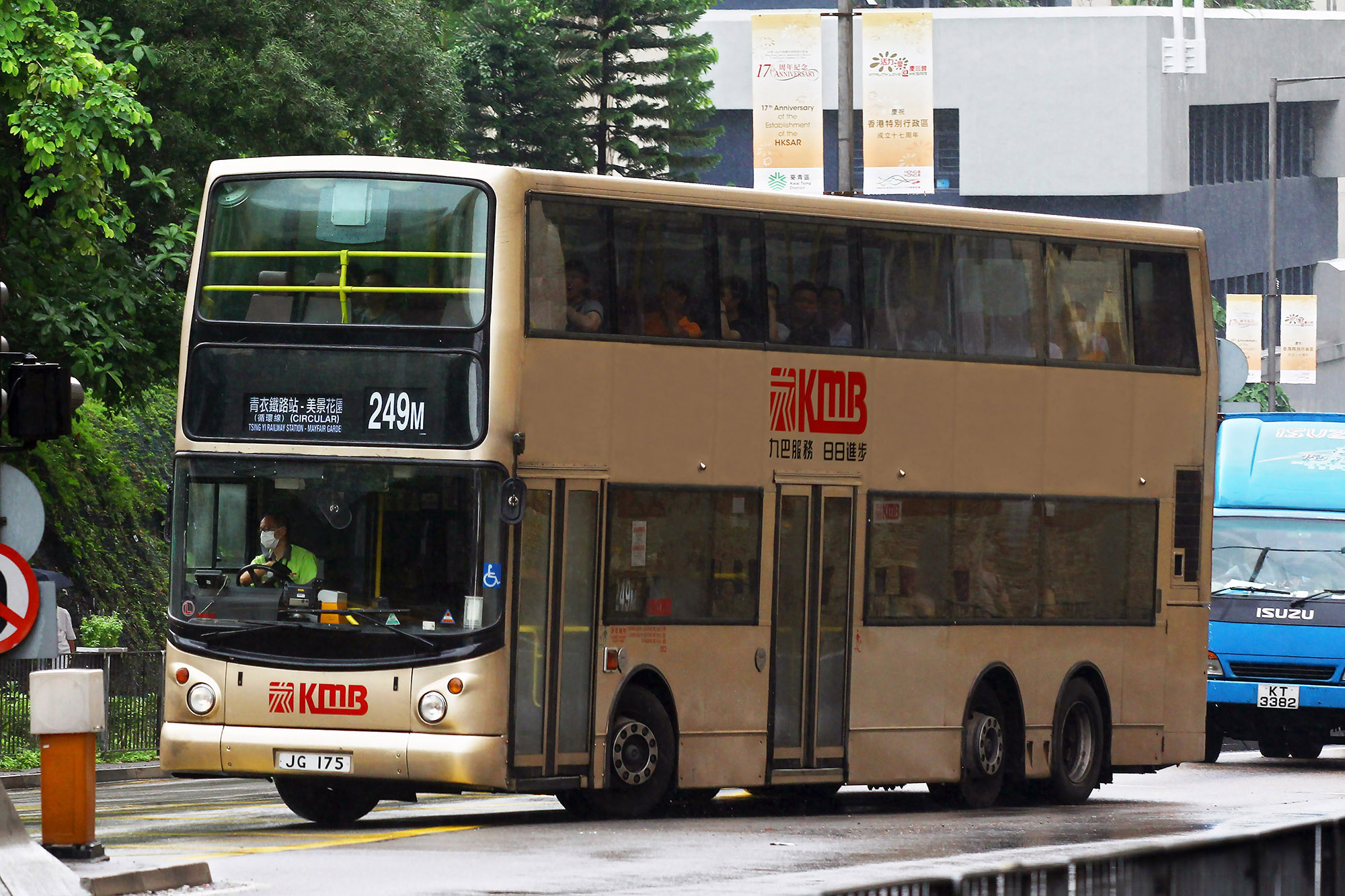
- Kowloon Motor Bus Alexander ALX500-bodied Volvo Super Olympian in June 2014

Overview
- Manufacturer: Volvo
- Production: 1998–2005
- Assembly: Irvine, Scotland, United Kingdom; Wrocław, Poland

Body and chassis
- Doors: 2 doors
- Floor type: Low floor

Powertrain
- Engine: Volvo D10A-285
- Power output: 285 hp (213 kW)
- Transmission: Voith DIWA 863.3; ZF Ecomat 4HP 590; ZF Ecomat 5HP 590

Dimensions
- Length: 10.6 and 12.0 metres
- Width: 2.50 and 2.55 metres
- Height: 4.40 metres

Chronology
- Predecessor: Tri-axle Volvo Olympian
- Successor: Volvo B9TL

The Volvo Super Olympian was a low-floor double-decker bus manufactured by Volvo. It replaced the 3-axle version of the Volvo Olympian (The Volvo B7TL replaced the 2-Axle version). The chassis had the designated manufacturer code B10TL.

== History ==
The Volvo Super Olympian was unveiled in 1998, with one chassis being sent to Hong Kong for a motor show held by International Union of Public Transport in the same year. The chassis was later returned to the United Kingdom.

== Chassis design ==
The Super Olympian chassis was based on the Volvo Olympian. The front radiator was moved behind the front axle on the 12 metre version, or in front of the second axle for the 10.6 metre version (due to its shorter wheelbase). In order to lower the chassis further, the assisted steering function of the middle axle was cancelled. The suspension system has also been largely modified so that it is electronically controlled instead of moving passively. One special feature is that after turning, the suspension unit does not return to normal, remaining tilted to either the left or right, until the bus becomes stationary.

An option for 11.3 metre length of Super Olympian was also available, but no orders were received.

The Super Olympian was powered by the Volvo D10A-285 (Euro 2 or Euro 3), with a maximum power of 285 hp (213 kW), coupled to either a ZF Ecomat or 3-speed Voith DIWA 863.3 automatic transmission. Its somewhat insufficient diesel engine power has earned some mildly derisive nicknames in Hong Kong. The most common are "豬" (pig), "扒" (meat cutlet) and "豬扒" (pork chop, derived from the pronunciation of the word "Super").

Initially, the Super Olympian chassis were built in Volvo's factory in Irvine, Scotland. After the closure of the factory in mid-2000, production was moved to Wrocław, Poland.

== Hong Kong ==
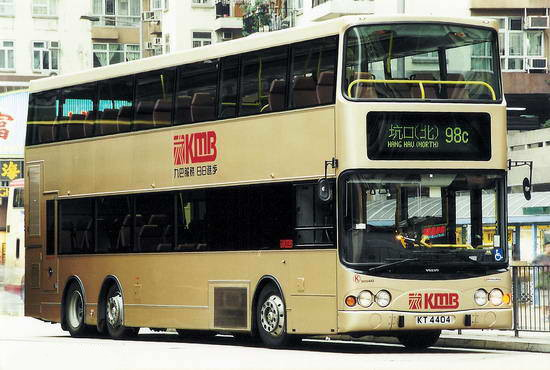
Kowloon Motor Bus Volgren CR223LD-bodied Volvo Super Olympian in 2004

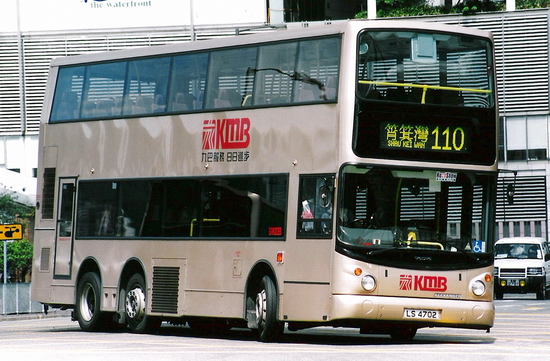
Kowloon Motor Bus 10.6m Alexander ALX500-bodied Volvo Super Olympian in 2006

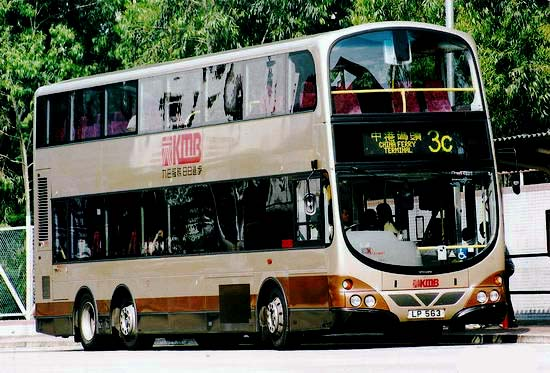
Kowloon Motor Bus Wright Explorer-bodied Volvo Super Olympian in August 2005

=== Kowloon Motor Bus ===
==== 12m version ====
Kowloon Motor Bus ordered the first batch of 61 (3ASV1-61) Alexander ALX500-bodied B10TL Super Olympians with ZF 4HP590 transmission, and roller shuttle route displays in 1998. These entered service in 1998/99. All except the prototype 3ASV3 had narrow 2+2 seats on the upper deck. All Super Olympians with plastic signs were retired in November 2017.

A further 80 Super Olympians (3ASV62-141) entered service in 2000/01. These buses have electronic route displays and ZF 5HP590 transmission. 3ASV78 was the 3,000th Alexander bodied bus supplied to KMB, and 3ASV141 was the first KMB bus to meet Euro III emission standards.

The last 351 Super Olympians (3ASV142-492), including 21 which were fitted with Australian Volgren CR223LD bodywork, entered service in 2001/02. All of these buses had their chassis built in Poland. Their D10A285 engines were built to meet Euro III emission standards and had aluminium alloy front wheels supplied by Alcoa. 3ASV297 was coated with special metallic paint, which shows different colours (mainly green and purple), depending on the angle of light reflection. The last Volgren-bodied Super Olympian (3ASV474) was retired on 11 November 2020, while the last Alexander ALX500-bodied Super Olympian (3ASV492) was retired on 19 December 2020.

==== 10.6m version ====
Kowloon Motor Bus was the only operator of 10.6 metre Super Olympians. The first 49 (ASV1-49) 10.6m Alexander ALX500 bodied Super Olympians were introduced in 2001. They are equipped with D10A285 Euro II engines and had Alcoa front wheels.

ASV50, which was put into service in 2002, is a prototype short-wheelbase Super Olympian (chassis built in 1999), and also the only short-wheelbase Super Olympian built in Scotland. It is equipped with a Euro II D10A285 engine and ZF 4HP590 transmission rather than the previous 5HP590 as fitted to older ASVs.

ASV51-100 were also equipped with the Euro III D10A285 engines. They are almost identical with ASV1-49, except for minor interior differences. Only the first 24 were put into service in 2003. The remaining 26 were stored for more than a year due to SARS, and the 26 were put into service between September 2004 and March 2005.

The last 10.6 metre Super Olympian and Alexander ALX500 (ASV100) was retired on 8 March 2023, which is these buses were de-registered.

==== 12m wider version ====
In January 2003, Kowloon Motor Bus received the first Wright-bodied Super Olympian with a 2.55 metre-wide body (once known as the Wright Explorer). Like the Alexander Dennis Enviro500, it featured a straight staircase and plug exit door. It was numbered AVW1 and was registered on 20 March 2003.

The next 49 buses (AVW2-50) with a slightly different design followed shortly after AVW1, they entered service in 2003/2004. The last 50 buses (AVW51-100), which are almost identical, entered service in 2004/2005, These were the last batch of Volvo Super Olympian ordered by KMB. The last Super Olympian (AVW92) was retired on 31 July 2023, which is buses were de-registered.

AVW96 (MA 4745) was exported to the UK in 2023.

=== New World First Bus ===
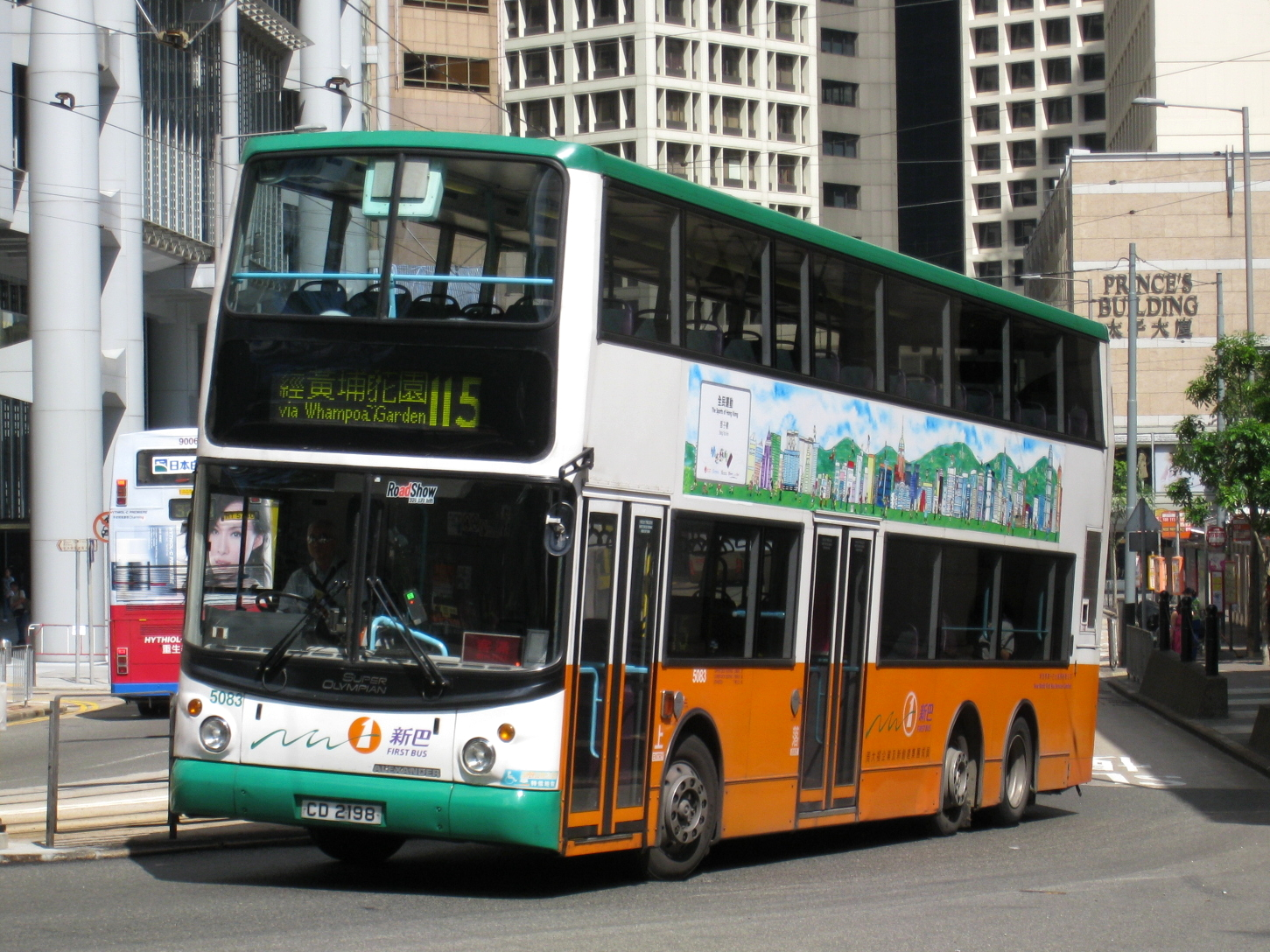
New World First Bus Alexander ALX500 bodied Volvo Super Olympian in June 2008

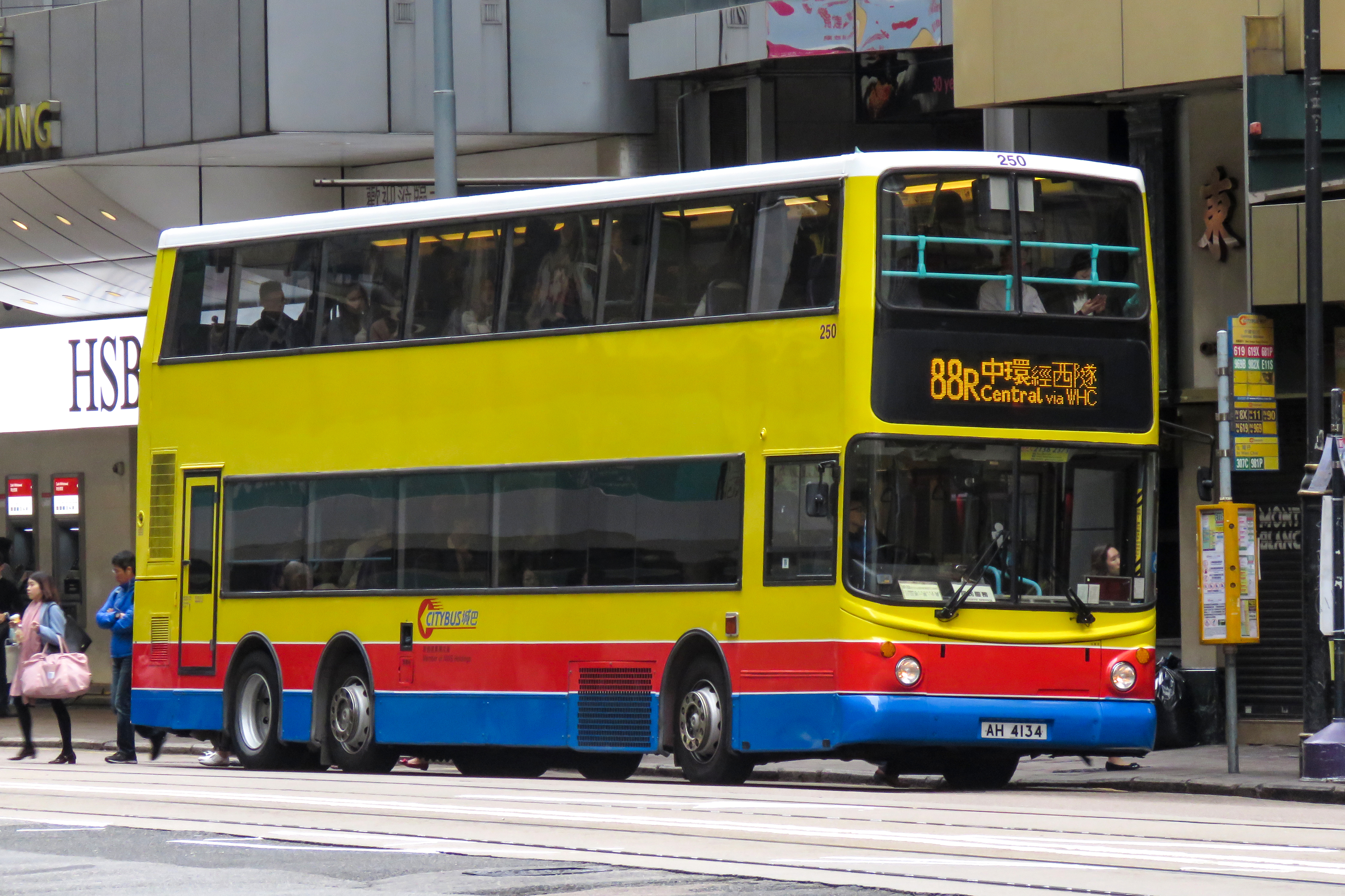
Citybus Alexander ALX500 bodied Volvo Super Olympian in January 2019

New World First Bus bought 103 Super Olympians in five batches, all are 12 metres long and were fitted with Alexander ALX500 bodies.

The first 40 (5001-5040), fitted with electronic route displays, were introduced in 1999. The next 20 (5041-5060), with their side route number boxes moved to a lower position, entered service in 2000/01. The chassis of 5060 was the first to be built in Poland. New World First Bus began de-registering the buses on 21 November 2017.

The next 19 Super Olympians (5061-5079), with Euro III D10A285 engines and Alcoa front wheels, entered service in 2001. To mark the occasion of meeting the Euro III emission standard, New World First Bus designed a full body advertisement for one of them (fleet number 5070) to state that they were environmentally friendly. They were followed by 10 similar examples (5080-5089) later that year. Among these buses, 5080-5086 had their registration numbers originated from ex China Motor Bus buses and service cars.

The last batch of 14 Super Olympians (5090-5103), entered service in 2002, had their rear electronic route number displays raised above the emergency window to form a box, the design being unique among all similar vehicles in Hong Kong. These were all withdrawn and were either sold to Citybus, converted to a training bus or headed to the scrapyard.

The last three buses in the fleet (5072, 5076, 5079) had been retired on 27 August 2019. These were the last buses to have no headrest in franchised service.

== Singapore ==
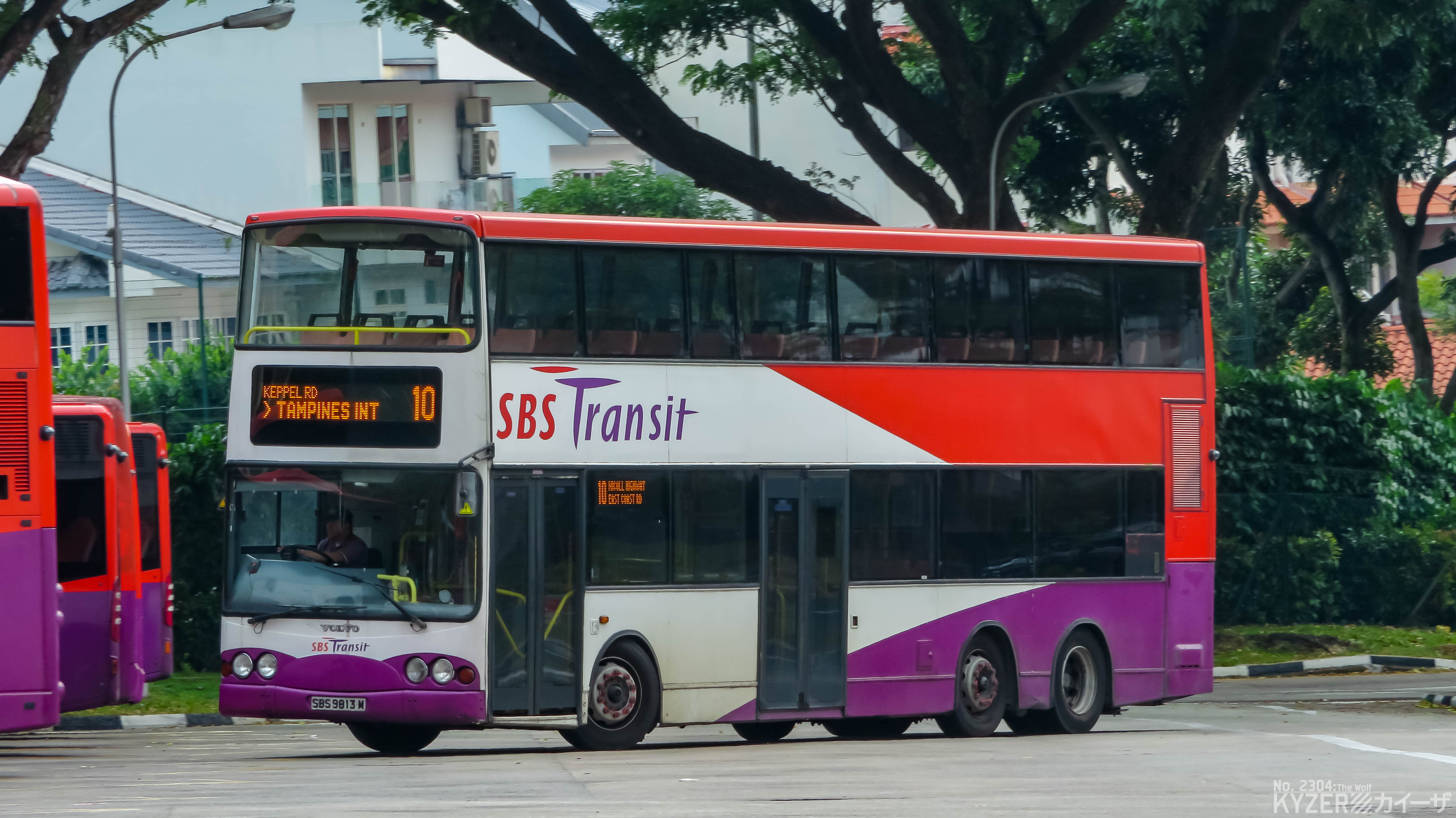
SBS Transit Volgren bodied Volvo Super Olympian

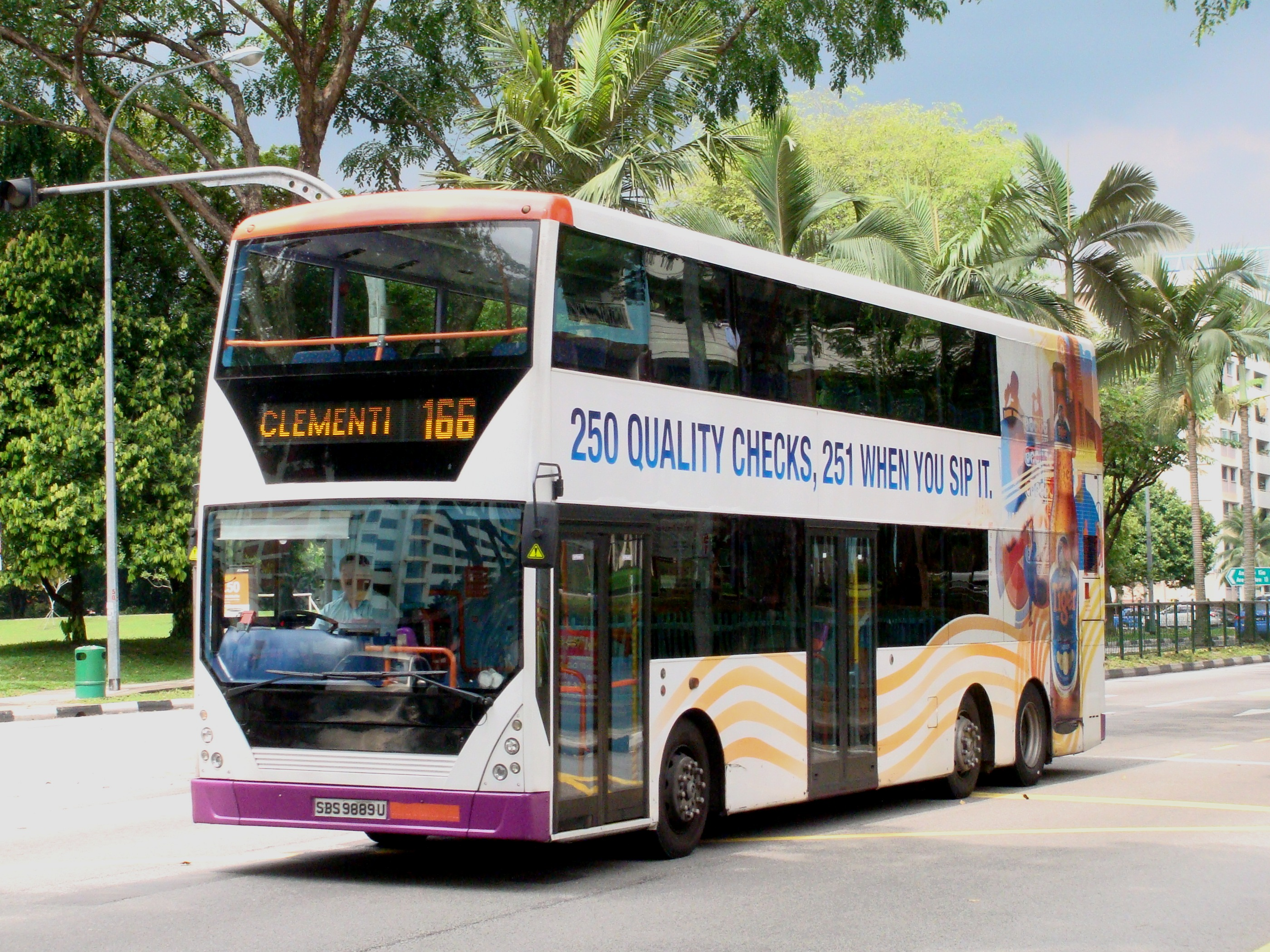
SBS Transit ComfortDelGro Engineering bodied Volvo Super Olympian demonstrator in March 2009

In late 1999, Volvo delivered one Volgren CR222LD-bodied Super Olympian to the then Singapore Bus Services for trial purposes.

== Replacement ==
Production of the Volvo Super Olympian ended in 2004 and 2005 after completion of the last order from Kowloon Motor Bus and SBS Transit. Its successor was the Volvo B9TL.
