= Duple Metsec =

Bus bodywork manufacturer

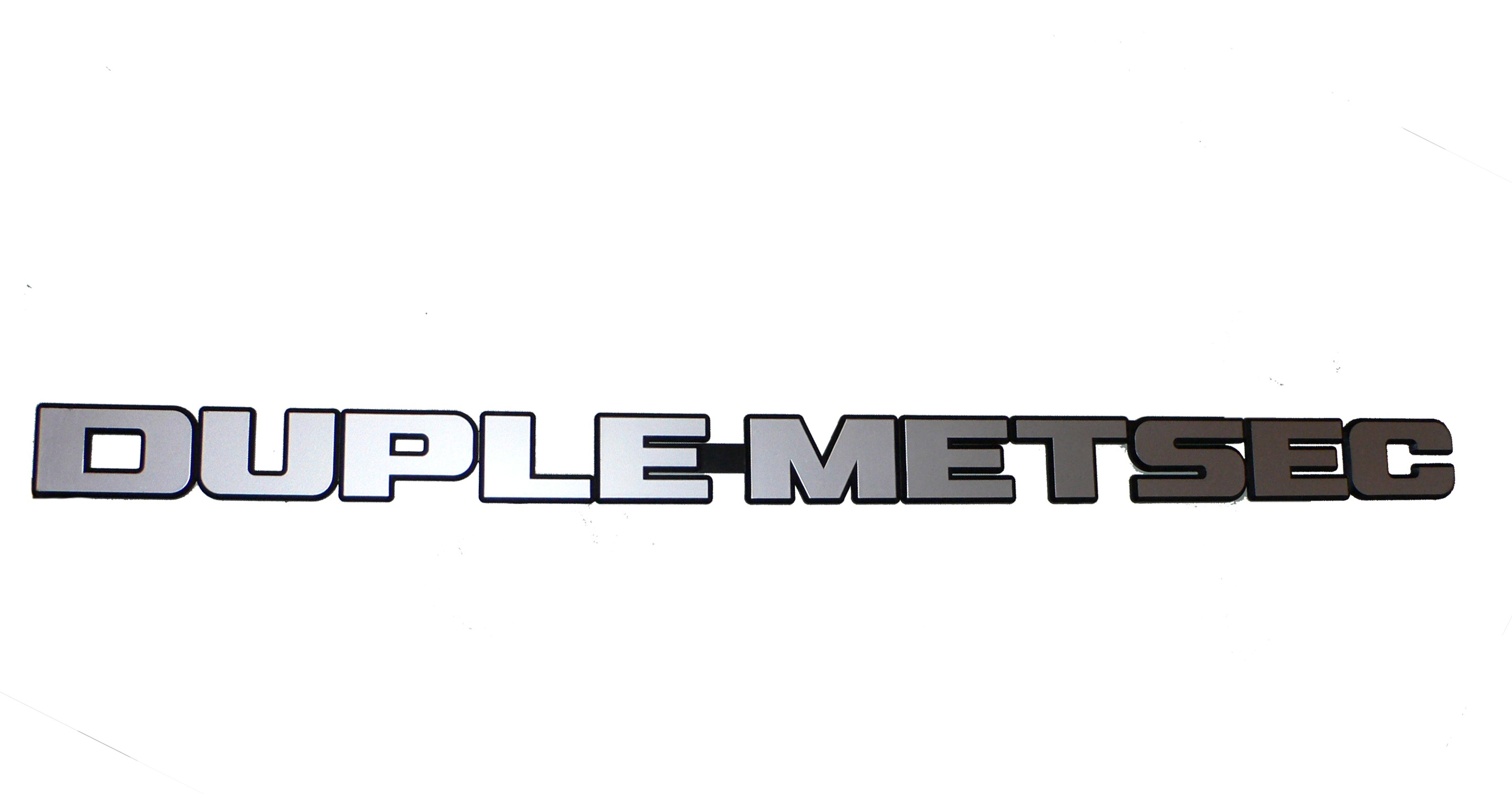
- Founded: 1980/1981
- Defunct: 2001
- Fate: Factory closed by TransBus International
- Headquarters: (2001) Cradley Heath, England
- Products: Bus bodies
- Parent: Duple Coachbuilders (1980/1981-1983); Hestair Group (1983-1988); Trinity Holdings (1989-1998); Mayflower Corporation (1998-2001)
- Website: www.duplemetsec.co.uk

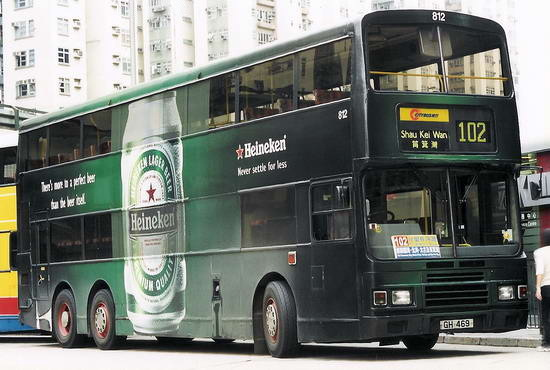
A Duple Metsec-body Dennis Dragon operated by Citybus in Hong Kong. All but four of a total of 1649 Dennis Dragons/Condors built were bodied by Duple Metsec.

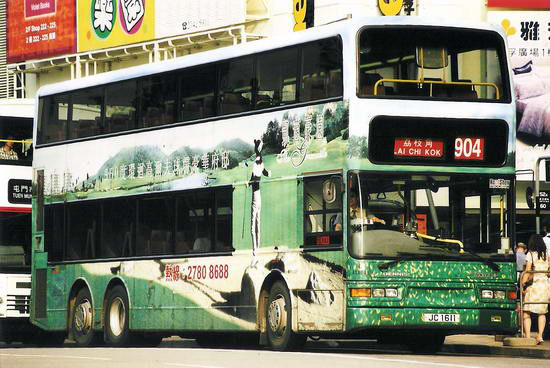
KMB's Dennis Trident 3 with Duple Metsec DM5000 body

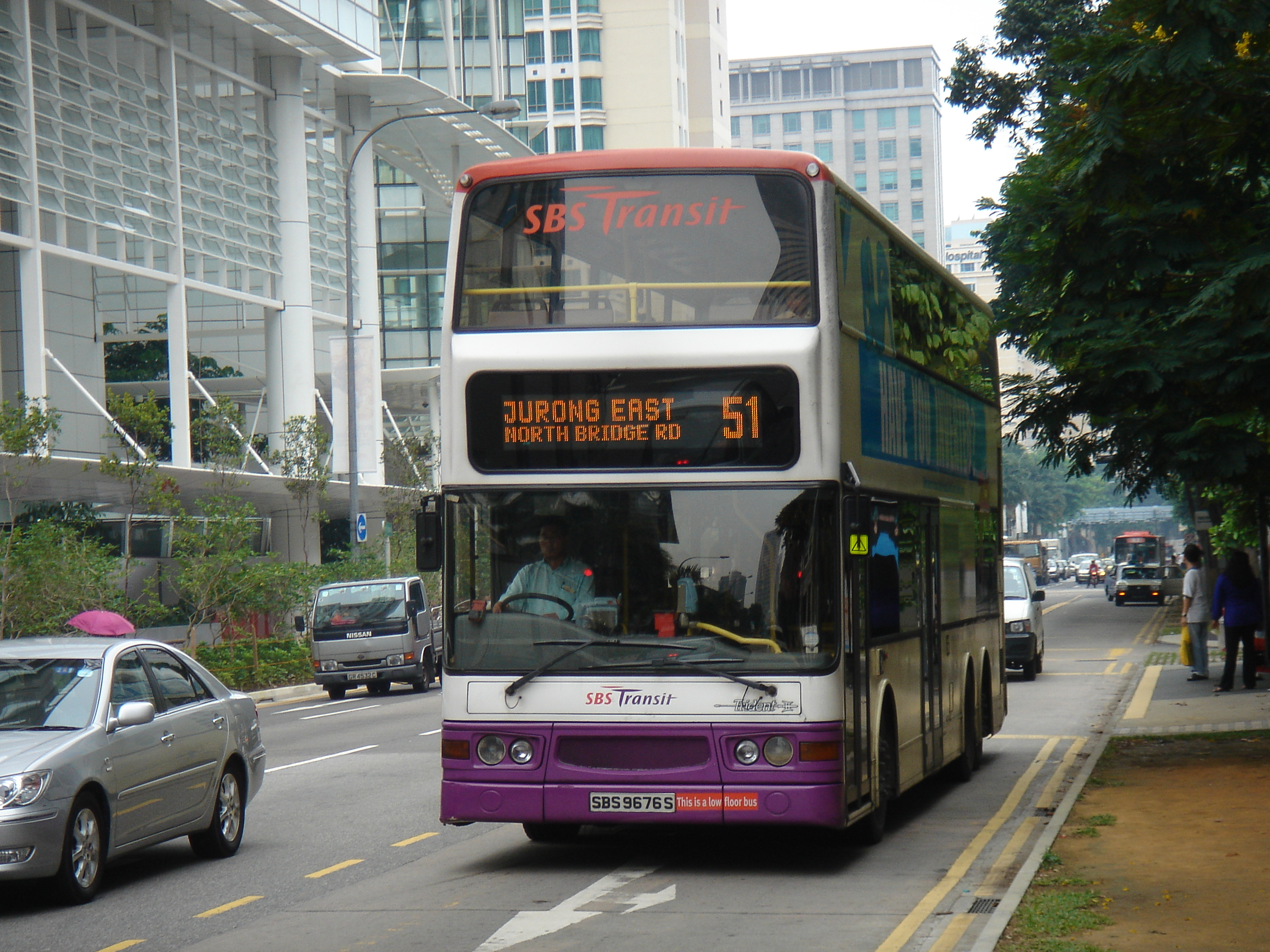
SBS Transit's Dennis Trident 3 with Duple Metsec 5000 body

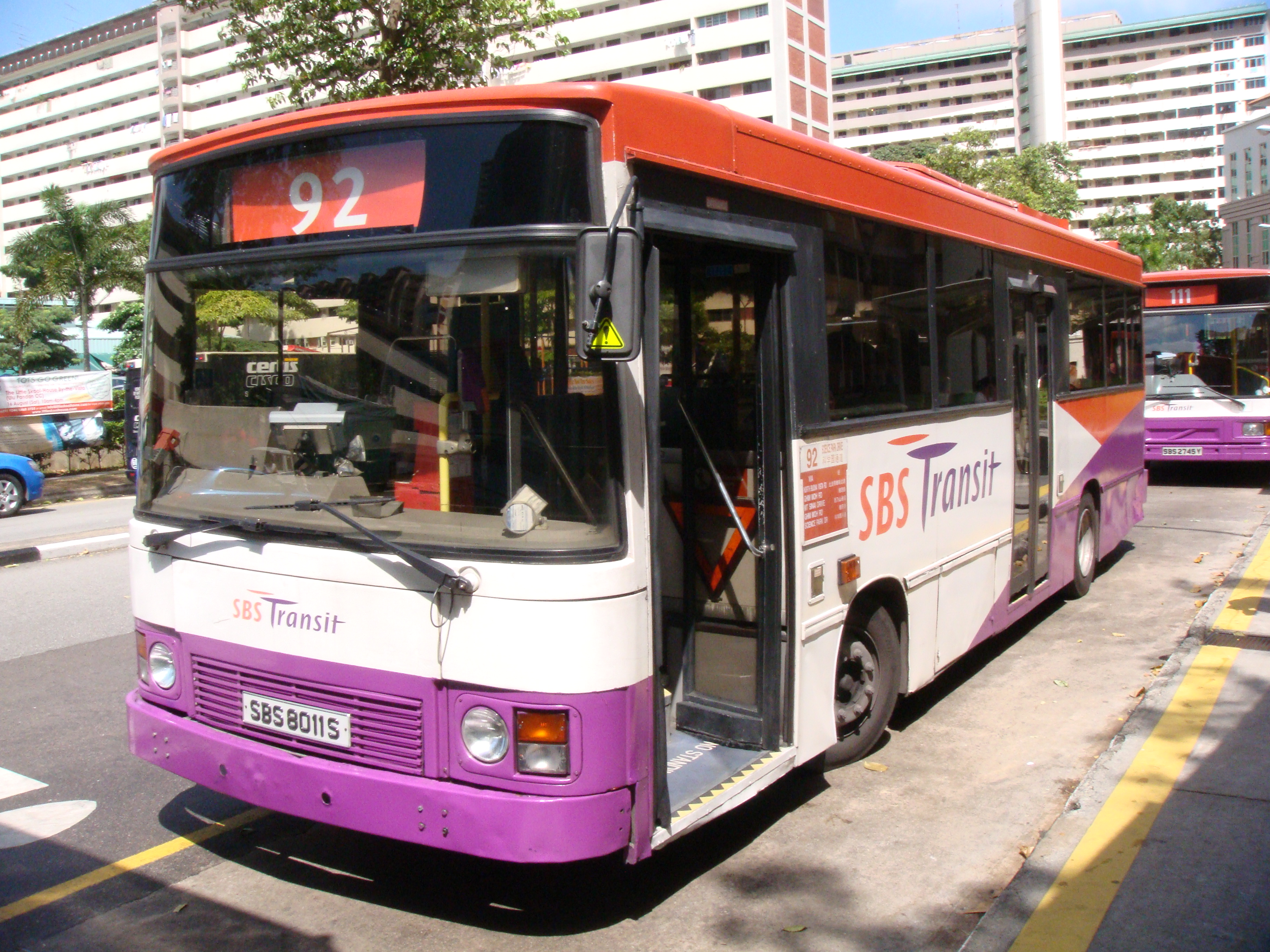
SBS Transit's Dennis Dart with Duple Metsec body

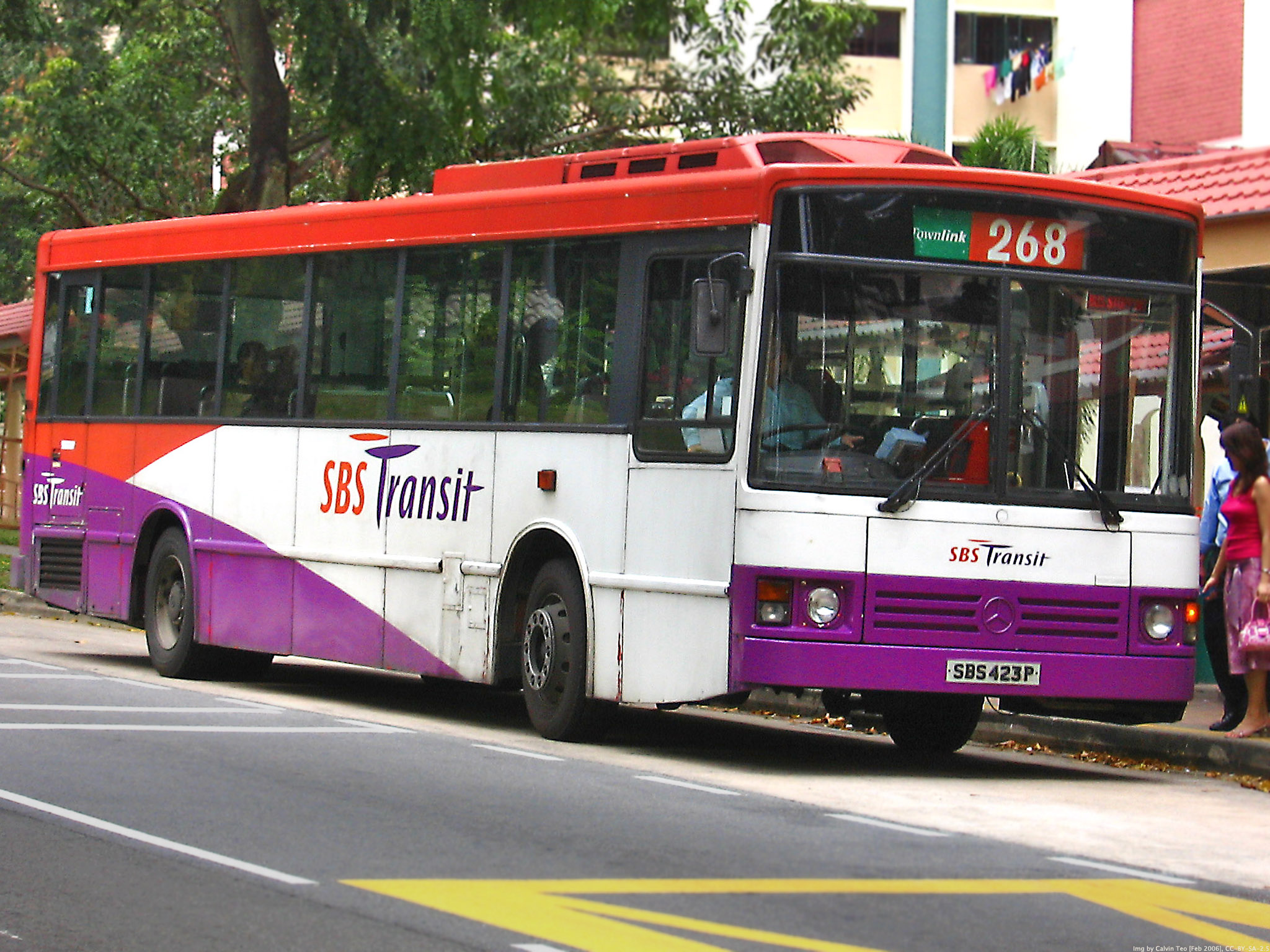
SBS Transit's Mercedes-Benz O405 with Duple Metsec body

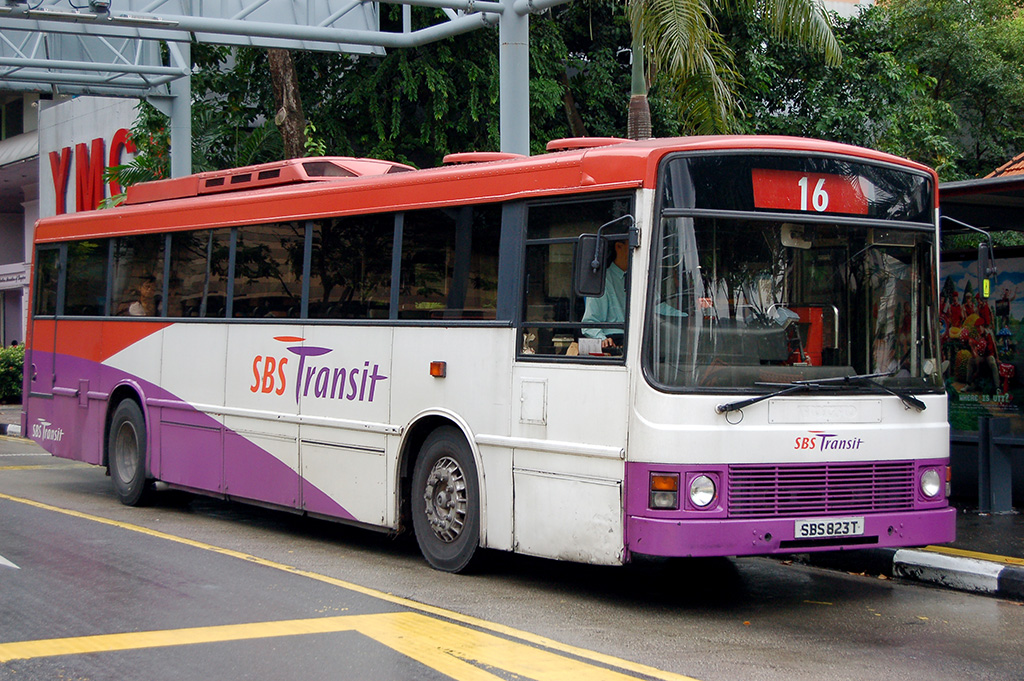
SBS Transit's Volvo B10M Mark 3 with Duple Metsec body

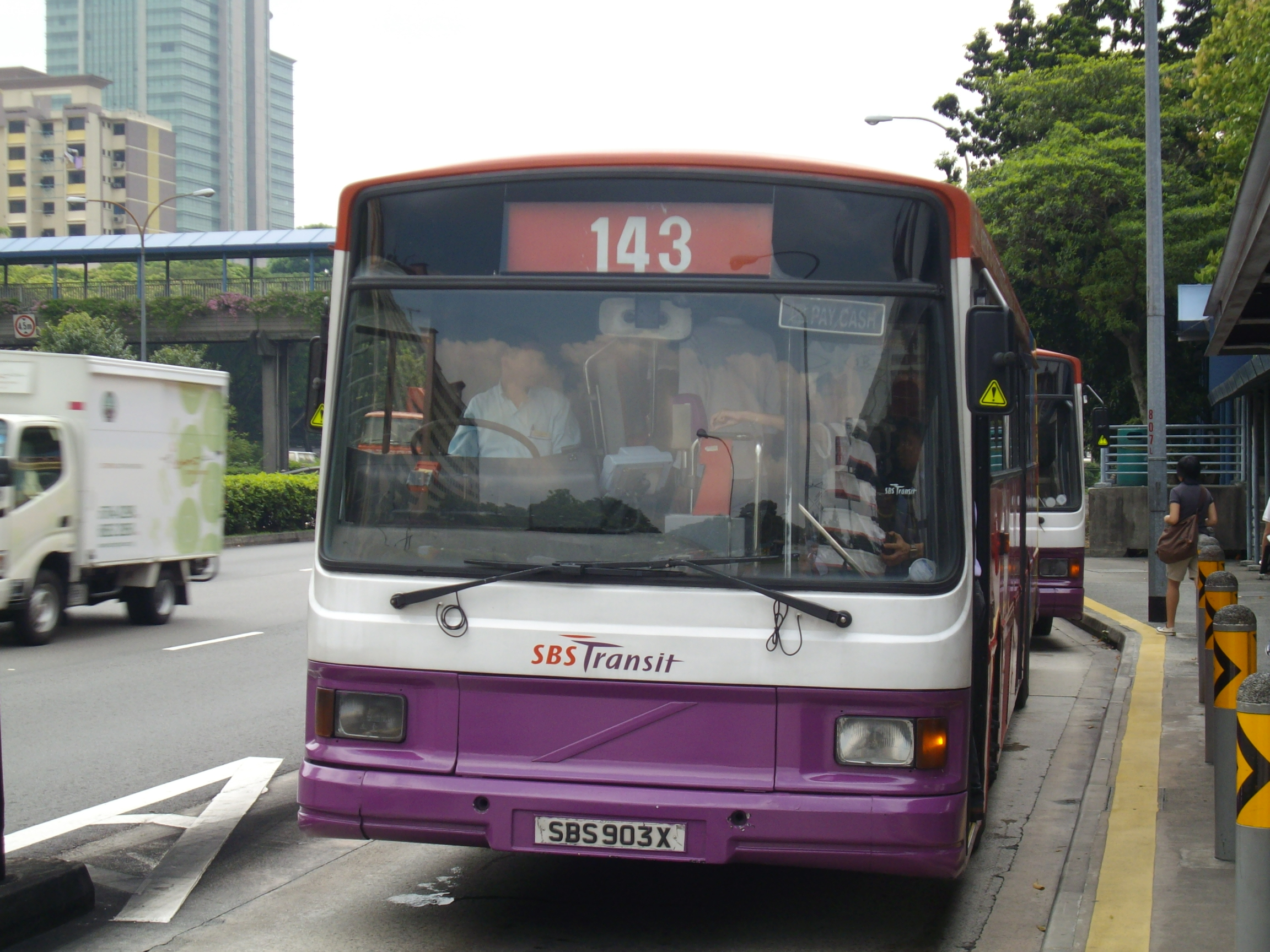
SBS Transit's Volvo B10M Mark 4 with Duple Metsec body

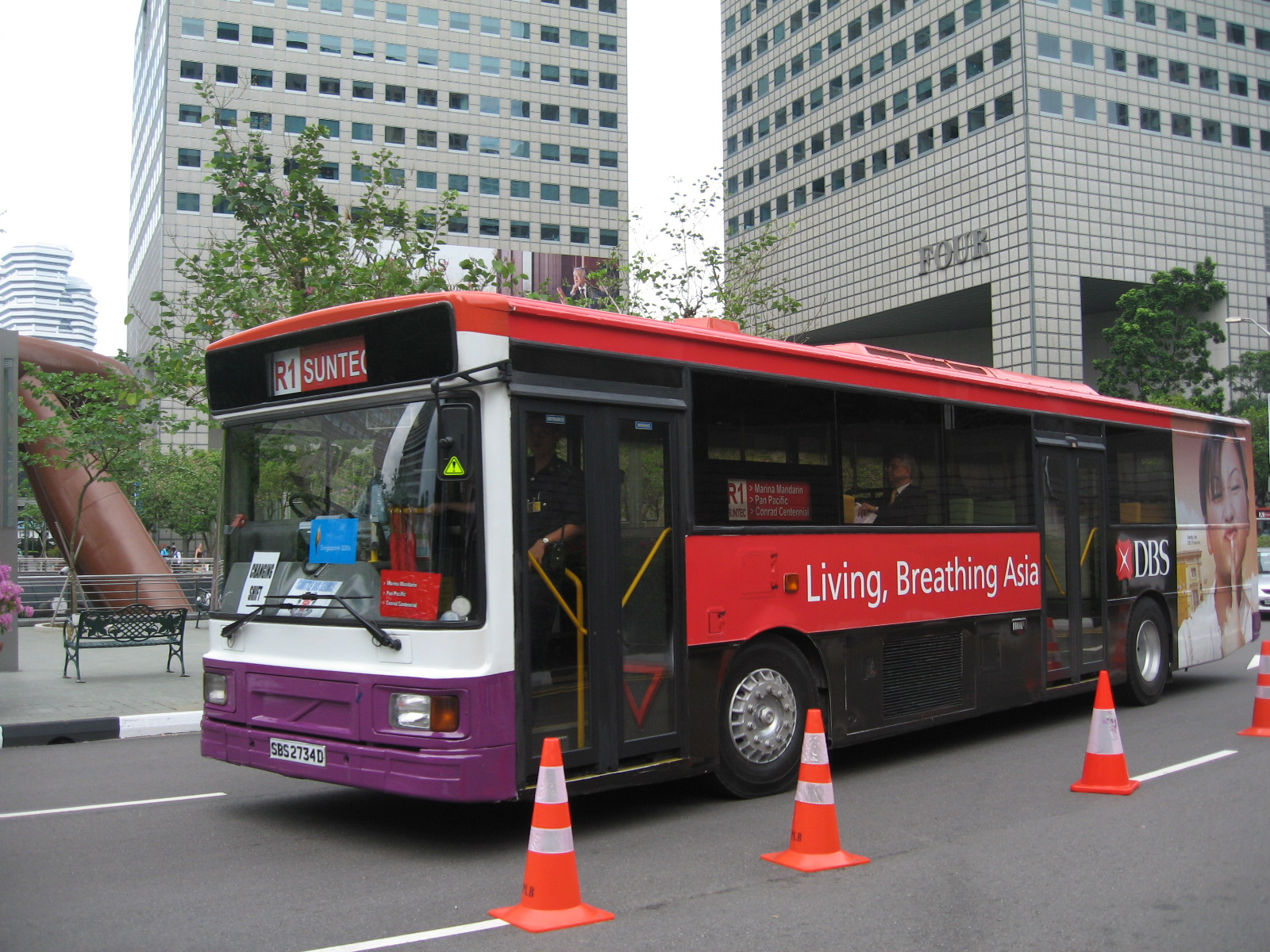
SBS Transit's Volvo B10M Mark 4 with Duple Metsec 3500 body

Duple Metsec was a bus bodywork builder based in West Midlands of England in the United Kingdom. It usually supplied body kits for bus assembly overseas.

It was originated from the bus body manufacturing business of Metal Sections, known as TI Metsec in the late 1970s, the present day Voestalpine Metsec plc. Metal Sections, as the name suggests, produced prefabricated sections of metal for customers for a variety of products. In the early days, Metal Sections was not involved in the bus body business, however, after supplying framing sections for other bus body builders, they decided to get into the business themselves.

The business was acquired by Duple Coachbuilders in 1980/1981. Duple Metsec became a subsidiary of Hestair Group in 1983 and then subsidiary of Trinity Holdings in 1989.

When Duple Coachbuilders was closed by Trinity Holdings in 1989, Duple Metsec was not closed and its business was retained. In October 1998, it was acquired by Mayflower Corporation.

The Duple Metsec factory was closed on formation of TransBus International in 2001, after which point TransBus still manufactured the DM5000 body. The following year, the Duple Metsec body department was merged with Walter Alexander Coachbuilders and Plaxton, those companies also having been acquired by TransBus, then TransBus was finally re-merged into Alexander Dennis in 2004.

== Duple Metsec "R" bodywork ==
The Duple Metsec "R" bodywork was built for various types of single-deckers including Volvo B10M for Singapore Bus Services from 1988 to 1995, and Mercedes-Benz O405.

== Duple Metsec "W" bodywork ==
The Duple Metsec "W" bodywork was built for "full-front" double-deckers. Production of this bodywork was started by Metal Sections as early as the 1970s and it had been built on some exported Daimler/Leyland Fleetline and Leyland Atlantean for Hong Kong and Singapore, etc. In the late 1970s, the bodywork was modified with rubber mounted windows.

After the formation of Duple Metsec, this bodywork redesigned and had been built on Leyland Atlantean, Dennis Jubilant, Leyland Victory Mark 2, Dennis Dominator and almost all the Dennis Dragons/Condors (3-axle) built. Duple Metsec "W" bodywork was built until circa 1998.

=== Duple Metsec Dragons and Condors ===
The first Duple Metsec "W" bodywork built for Dennis Dragons/Condors was built in 1982, which was built on one Dennis Condor prototype with China Motor Bus (CMB), Hong Kong. But CMB finally chosen the complete MCW Metrobus to meet its demand of 3-axle buses. The "W" bodywork was modified and supplied to a number of Dennis Dragons for Kowloon Motor Bus (KMB), Hong Kong. After the MCW Metrobus ceased production in 1989, CMB began to receive Dennis Condors with Duple Metsec "W" bodywork.

In 1989, the first Duple Metsec "W" bodywork for air-conditioned Dennis Dragons/Condors was built on a prototype air-conditioned Dennis Dragon for KMB. The body pillars had been re-located and the air ducts for the air-conditioning system were fitted on the ceilings of both saloons, near the side windows. Subsequent non-air-conditioned "W" bodywork built also had similar body design and were supplied to CMB (one batch in the early 1990s), KMB and two batches for Africa.

CMB was the first to buy air-conditioned Dennis Condors with Duple Metsec "W" bodywork due to competition from Citybus and they specified gasket glazing with openings on side windows (the gasket glazing on the prototype air-conditioned Dennis Dragon for KMB had no openings on both sides). The specification of these remained the same for subsequent batches until the then chief engineer in 1996 managed to specify gasket glazing without opening vents in them. The order for the following year went further and specified bonded glazing and 2+2 seating.

KMB started to acquire air-conditioned Dennis Dragons with Duple Metsec "W" bodywork, after the first batch for CMB on Dennis Condor chassis. All had fixed bonded glazing. Starting from 1993, KMB also acquired the unique 9.98-metre Dragons with Duple Metsec "W" bodywork.

After Citybus took over 28 routes from China Motor Bus in 1993, they were looking to dual source their vehicles rather than solely rely on one supplier. Dennis Specialist Vehicles in partnership with Duple Metsec were the obvious if not only choice at that time as they were already supplying air-conditioned double deckers to the other two franchised operators. However Citybus had slightly different needs compared to the other two operators, and they also had no space or inclination to assemble their own vehicles. Duple Metsec therefore had to find a third party who would be willing to assemble their body kits on the Dennis Dragon chassis and eventually Salvador Caetano in Porto, Portugal were chosen. The bodies also had new fronts designed for them which would accommodate the same size of windscreens that were fitted to the Alexander R-type bodies in the Citybus fleet. The front dash and cab area were also quite different as Caetano applied their coach styling skills to design a better cab area. The Citybus Dragons were unique in being the only 10.3-metre single-door Dragons built, and the 12m Dragons were the first air-conditioned examples for Hong Kong.

The Hong Kong Air Cargo Terminals Limited received four Dennis Dragons with Duple Metsec "W" bodywork in 1996. The body design was similar with Citybus examples.

== Duple Metsec DM3500 ==
Duple Metsec DM3500 its a vehicle body, which was built for Volvo B10M for SBS Transit from 1997 to 2000, as the last order by Singapore Bus Service (SBS).

== Duple Metsec DM5000 ==
Duple Metsec DM5000 its a vehicle body, which was built for Dennis Trident 3. These buses operate with New World First Bus, Citybus, Kowloon Motor Bus of Hong Kong and SBS Transit of Singapore, etc. They are equipped with Cummins Euro 2 or Euro 3 engines and all of them are air conditioned.

Duple Metsec body two of the pre-production batch of Dennis Trident chassis for Citybus. One was finished as a normal service bus while the other has finish as prototype airport coach. Both had non-standard interior colour schemes for Citybus to consider for their future orders.

Duple Metsec were quite proactive in working with Dennis Specialist Vehicles to develop a body for a short 10.6 metre version of the Dennis Trident, and they bodied the first two short Trident chassis. Along with the two original 12.0 metre prototypes, these buses were unique in being assembled by Duple Metsec themselves at their Birmingham premises. Normally Duple Metsec only produced body kits for assembly by either third parties or by the bus operators themselves. Later Duple Metsec also developed a 10.3 metre low height version for New World First Bus of Hong Kong.

After the transfer of production of Duple Metsec 5000 bodywork to Alexander factory in Falkirk, it was still offered on the left hand drive version of the Dennis Trident chassis. In 2001, when New World First Bus wanted to place a repeat order for their special low height Dennis Trident, TransBus offered to produce another batch of this Duple Metsec design to win the order. The TransBus batch is almost identical to the original Duple Metsec design, with the main difference being the fitment of circular indicator lights on the rear of the body, rather than the curved corner units used by Duple Metsec.

Production of the Duple Metsec DM5000 body continued until 2002.

== See also ==
- Dennis Specialist Vehicles
- Alexander Dennis
- Metsec
