= Volvo C10M =

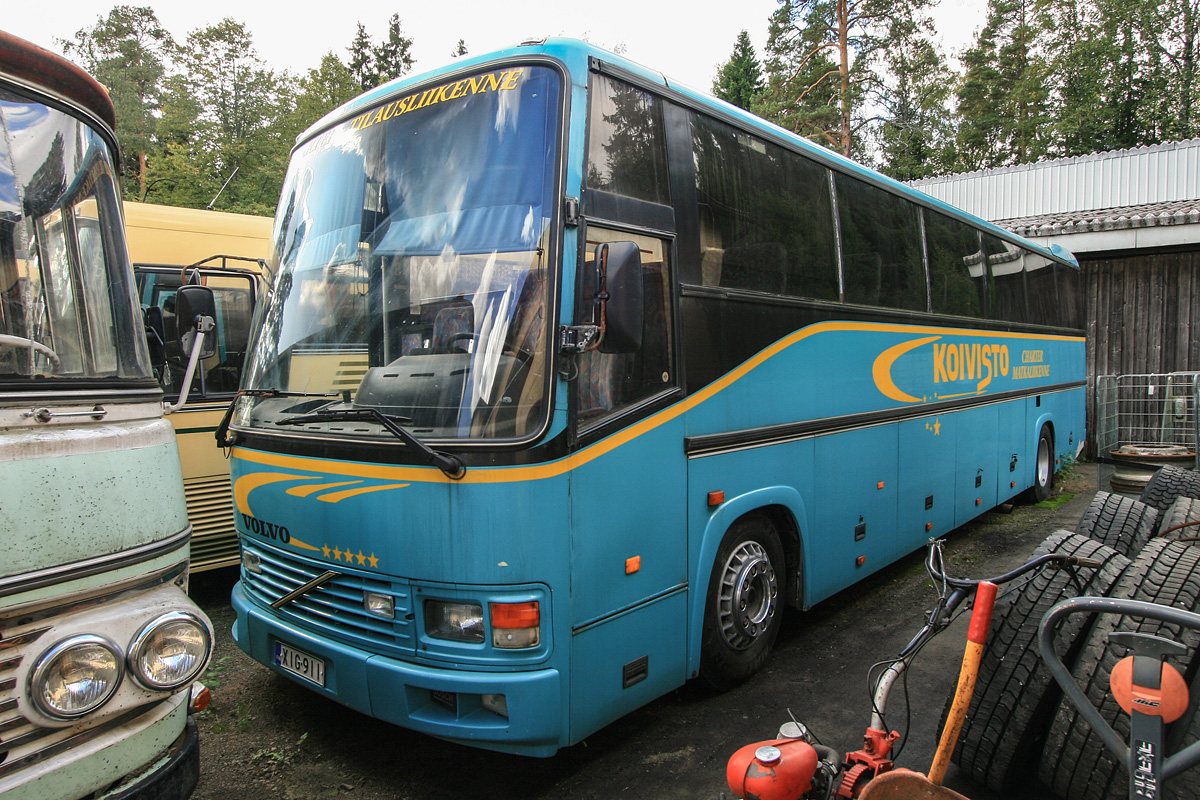
- Koivisto Volvo C10M-70 in Nuutajärvi, Finland

Overview
- Type: Coach (bus)
- Manufacturer: Volvo
- Production: 1984-1987
- Assembly: Switzerland: Biel (Ramseier & Jenzer); Finland: Vantaa (Wiima)

Body and chassis
- Class: Commercial vehicle
- Doors: 2 (1-0-1)
- Floor type: Step entrance
- Chassis: Volvo C10M

Dimensions
- Wheelbase: 6.33, 7.00 metres
- Length: 11.8, 12.0 metres
- Width: 2.50 metres
- Height: 3.47 metres

The Volvo C10M was a semi-integral coach introduced by Volvo in 1984. C10M was also a coach chassis based on the Volvo B10M. While the normal B10M chassis had the engine mounted right behind the front axle, the C10M had it centered between the front and rear axle, providing even better weight balance.

The coach was built by Swiss coachbuilder Ramseier & Jenzer, and was available as the C10M-70 with a total length of 12.00 metres, and the C10M-63 with a total length of 11.83 or 12.00 metres. The C10M family was expected to also include a shorter C10M-55, but none were built before production of the C10M ended. It was discontinued in December 1986 as part of a decision by Volvo to exit the integral coach market.

By the time the C10M coach was discontinued only around 80 had been built, including ten for the United Kingdom, ten for Sweden, seven for Norway and two for Denmark.

In Finland, the C10M chassis was also available with the Wiima Finlandia bodywork, and between April 1986 and November 1987, operator Someron Linja received a dozen of these. The Finlandia had similar specifications to the integral C10M, and looked overall quite the same, but the grille was different. The Wiima Finlandia was developed for the C10M integral coach, but Volvo chose the Swiss manufacturer instead. It was also available on Volvo B10M and Scania K112CL chassis between 1985 and 1987. Wiima had before the C10M experimented with extending shorter wheelbase B10M chassis in front of the engine to get it further back, which they unofficially called B10M-W.

The idea of moving the engine further back on the B10M was continued by some coachbuilders such as Carrus and Jonckheere. This was referred to as Volvo B10M-C. On the B12M, which was introduced in 2001, the engine position of the C10M became standard.
