= Megabus (Europe) =

Former British long-distance coach operator

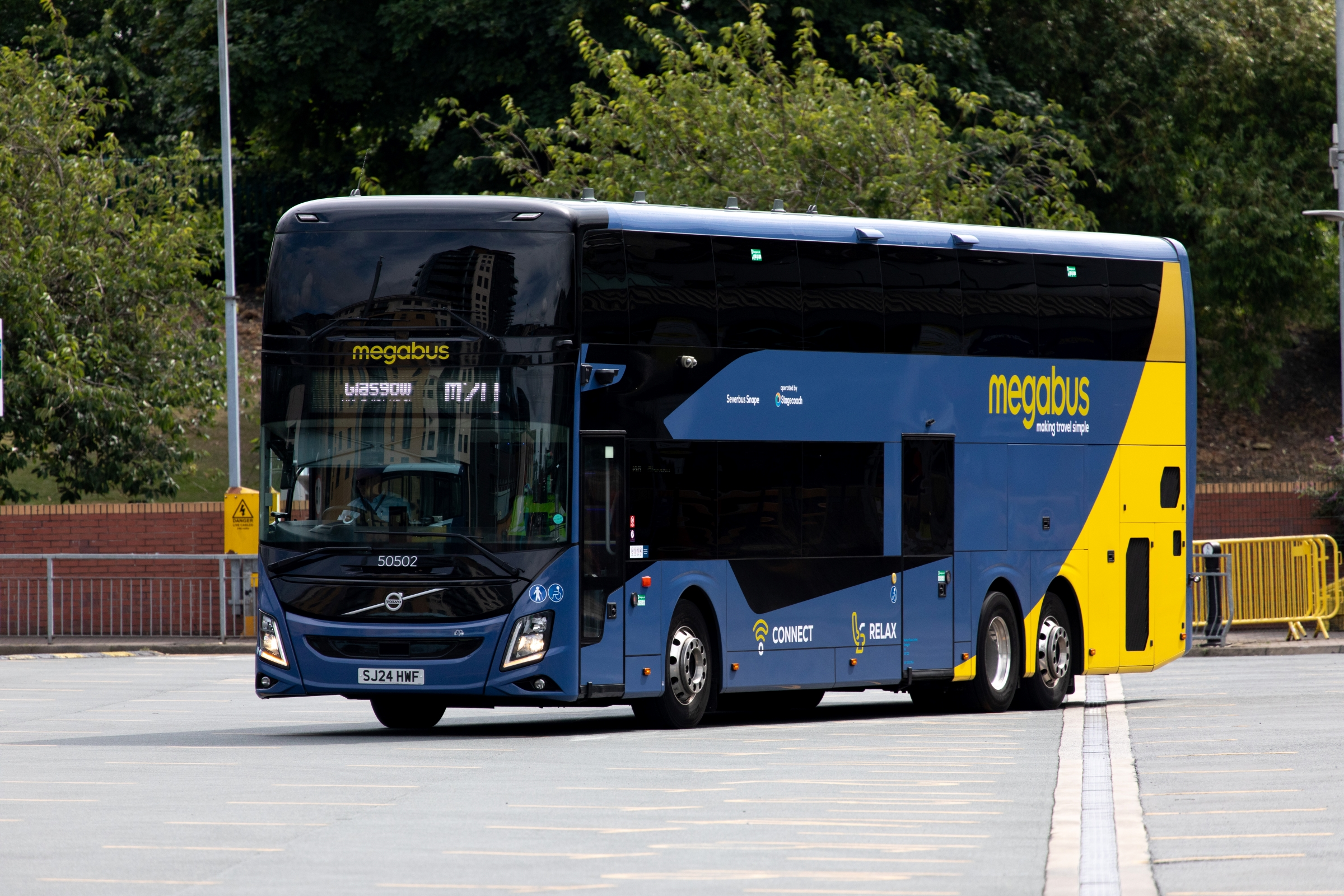
- Volvo 9700DD bodied Volvo B13RLE at Leeds City bus station in July 2024
- Parent: Stagecoach Group (2003–2022); Scottish Citylink (2022–2025)
- Founded: August 2003; 23 years ago
- Defunct: December 2025; 8 months ago
- Headquarters: Buchanan bus station Killermont, Glasgow
- Service area: United Kingdom
- Service type: Intercity bus service
- Website: uk.megabus.com

Megabus was an operator of intercity bus services in Europe and the United Kingdom. It was founded in August 2003 by the Stagecoach Group through its Stagecoach Midlands division, and subsequently expanded across the United Kingdom by the end of the decade, competing with National Express.

In August 2022, Megabus was sold to Scottish Citylink, with all Megabus services in Scotland adopting the Citylink brand. All services in England and Wales were withdrawn from October 2024 in the face of increased competition from market newcomer FlixBus, with the final two England–Scotland cross-border services withdrawn in December 2025. (Note: The Megabus website still exists, but now functions as a portal to purchase tickets on Scottish Citylink and South West Falcon services, which no longer carry Megabus branding.)

== History ==
=== Formation ===
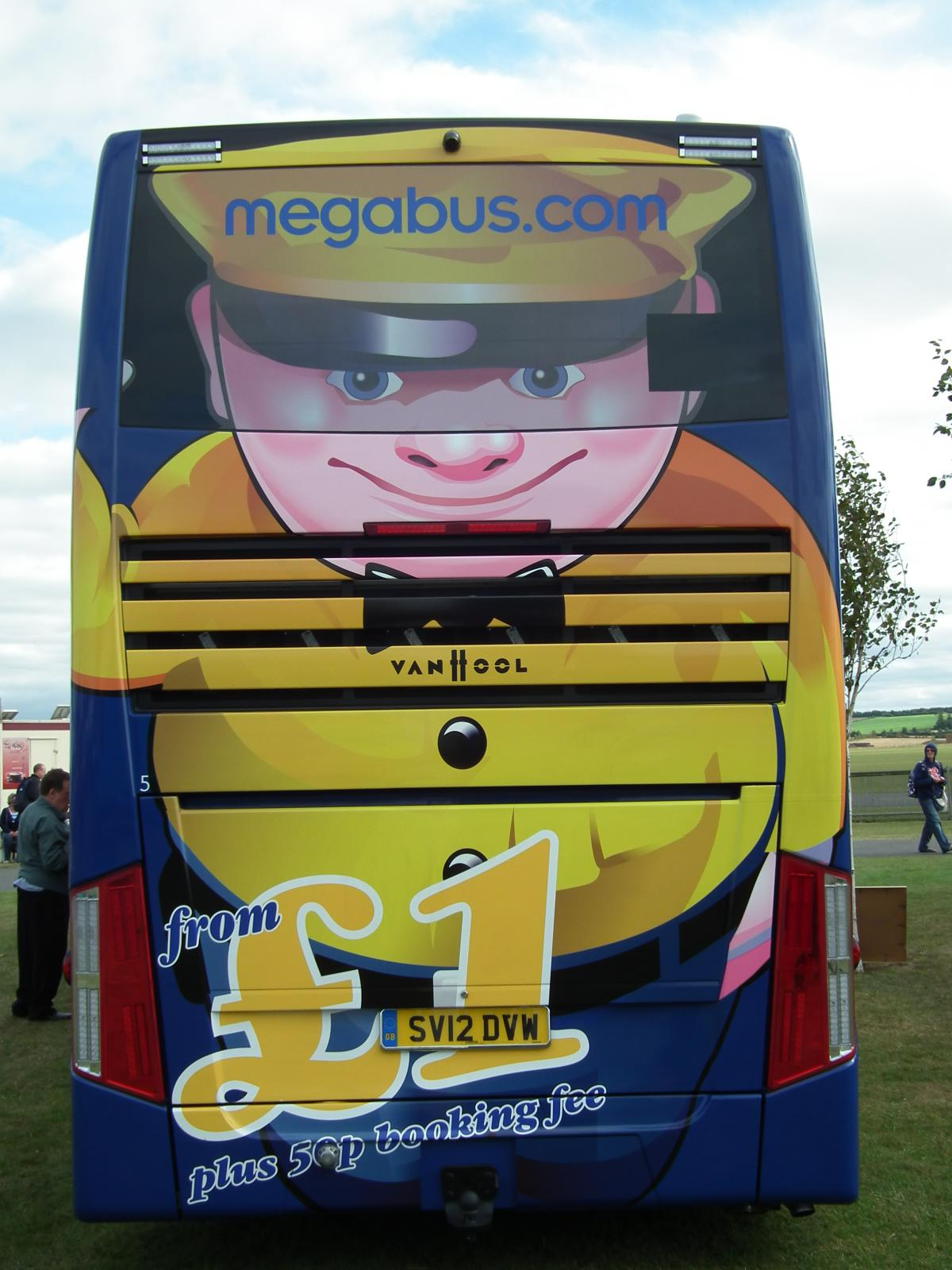
Megabus mascot Sid

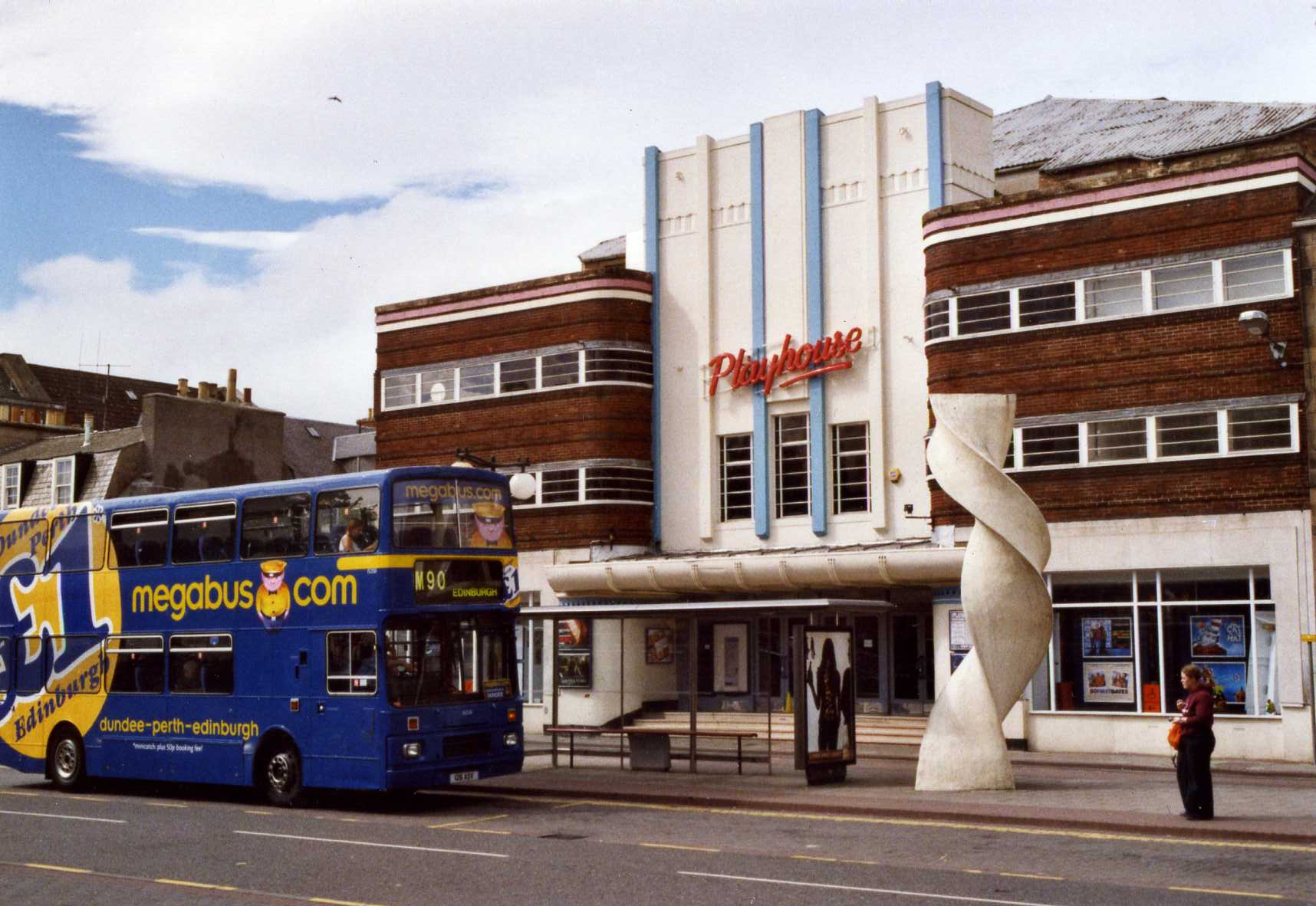
Alexander RH bodied Volvo B10M on the M90 service in Perth in 2004

Services from London to Oxford commenced on 4 August 2003, and from Edinburgh to Glasgow and Perth and Glasgow to Dundee were added one month later. During November 2003 routes from Manchester to Liverpool and Leeds were added, but these ceased on 27 June 2004 and 3 October 2004 respectively.

On 1 March 2004, a network of routes from London's Green Line Coach Station, a short distance from Victoria Coach Station, to Brighton, Portsmouth, Southampton, Bournemouth, Bristol, Exeter, Plymouth, Cardiff, Swansea and Birmingham were added.

On 28 June 2004, routes from London to Milton Keynes, Leicester, Chesterfield, Sheffield, Leeds, Manchester and Glasgow were added and within two months these were followed by the expansion of the Scottish routes to include Aberdeen and Inverness. Stagecoach West lost the contract to run the National Express route between London, Cheltenham and Gloucester, prompting it to introduce competing Megabus services from 5 September 2004.

On 6 September 2004, Stagecoach took over the Motorvator service between Edinburgh and Glasgow. This enabled Stagecoach to cancel the dedicated Megabus service between the two cities. Routes between London and Liverpool, and London and Newcastle started on 10 October 2004. On 15 November 2004, the Oxford to London service was replaced by seats on the Oxford Tube. From 6 December 2004, the Megabus service between Cheltenham, Gloucester and London also called at Swindon.

On 31 January 2005, Stagecoach X5 between Oxford and Cambridge became part of the Megabus network, selling a number of seats per journey in the same way as the Oxford Tube and Motorvator. From 18 April 2005, Nottingham, Worthing and Winchester were added to the network by slight extensions/modifications to existing routes, but rationalisation of the rest of the network took place, with some early morning and late evening services were withdrawn. From 13 June 2005, the Liverpool to London service called additionally at Stoke-on-Trent and a new service was introduced between Coventry and London. However, the London-Cardiff-Swansea service was withdrawn between Cardiff and Swansea.

The joint venture between Citylink and Megabus led to a co-ordination of services in Scotland. On 21 November 2005, the 900 Motorvator service was replaced by an enhanced Citylink service. However, the facility to buy seats through the Megabus website was retained. The next week, most of the faster Citylink services between Aberdeen, Dundee, Perth and Glasgow, and Inverness, Perth and Edinburgh were replaced by a more frequent, combined Megabus/Citylink service.

Following the loss of National Express contracts at Rugby depot, on 5 December 2005, the London to Birmingham service was increased in frequency to every two hours. However, an additional stop was introduced at the outskirts of Coventry, with the withdrawal of the direct once a day Megabus service to Coventry city centre. One journey a day in each direction was extended to Wolverhampton. The stops in the south of Birmingham were no longer served. Further changes on this day were the doubling of the London to Nottingham service to twice a day with one journey extended to Chesterfield, which regained its Megabus service lost in April 2005, and the introduction of a new once a day service from London to Norwich.

From 16 February 2006, a slower Citylink service between Dundee, Perth and Glasgow became available to book through the Megabus website, restoring Perth bus station to the Megabus network. The same day of the Citylink service modifications, the London to Manchester route was extended to Preston, with certain journeys extended further to Blackpool or Lancaster. This coincided with the loss of National Express work at Preston depot. The extensions to Blackpool and Lancaster were short lived, and were withdrawn in February 2006, citing low passenger numbers.

A number of changes to routes were made on 27 March 2006. A new direct service was introduced between Ferrytoll Park and Ride in Fife, Edinburgh and London via Newcastle and Sheffield. Together with changes to the Leeds to London services meant that changes at Tibshelf services were no longer needed. In addition, many routes had timetable changes. In particular, the London to Southampton and London to Portsmouth routes became feeders to the London to Bournemouth service, meaning that passengers were required to change at Winchester. Some London to Bristol journeys were extended to Cwmbran. The London to Norwich service was withdrawn on 14 May 2006, as were the services from London to Wolverhampton and Chesterfield, while the London to Cheltenham service introduced an extra stop at Reading Coachway on 20 November 2006.

Early in February 2007, it was announced that the service between London, Milton Keynes, Leicester and Nottingham would be withdrawn on 11 March 2007. These services would later be restored weekdays and Saturdays following the acquisition of the East Midlands Trains franchise by Stagecoach, to and from London by Megatrain. From 21 May 2007, services between London and Leeds were extended to include Middlesbrough, Sunderland and Newcastle. Services from Green Line Coach Station moved to Victoria Coach Station in a deal with Transport for London on 1 October 2007.

From October 2009, Megabus started a "cross-country" Cardiff to Newcastle service, the M35.

In May 2011, services were introduced between London and Norwich, Leeds and Edinburgh, and London and Swansea and Pembroke Dock with through ferry fares to Rosslare Europort in Ireland. Additional journeys were added to several existing routes.

=== International expansion ===
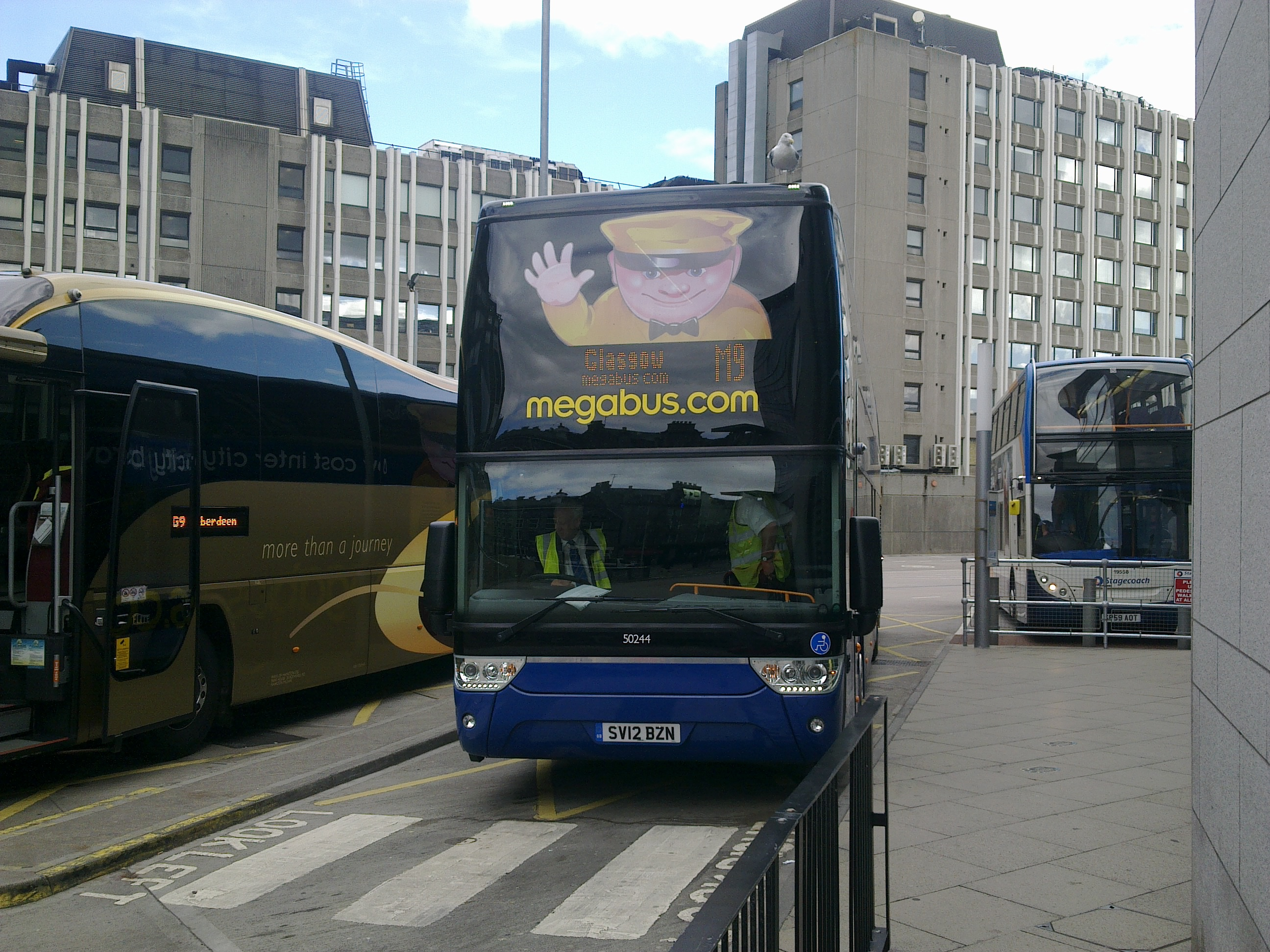
Van Hool TDX27 Astromega at Union Square Aberdeen bus station

From April 2012, Megabus began cross-nation services linking the UK to continental Europe, from Birmingham and London to Paris and from Leicester and London to Brussels and Amsterdam. This was announced a month prior to the introduction of the services. A third route, which operates entirely outside the UK, links Paris, Brussels and Amsterdam. From October 2012, Megabus extended the M92 Edinburgh to Dundee service to terminate at Aberdeen giving Dundee and Perth an every 30 minute frequency during the day to Aberdeen which interworks with service M9, and giving Aberdeen a direct service to Edinburgh which had previously been missing.

In 2013, Megabus started a route between Cologne, Brussels, Gent and London.

In 2014, Megabus launched a route between London, Paris, Toulouse and Barcelona. In Germany, as megabus.com GmbH, they also launched a route between Cologne, Frankfurt, Stuttgart and Munich.

On 24 June 2015, Megabus launched first intercity bus services in Italy with 22 coaches out of a depot in Bergamo.

On 8 July 2015, a service commenced from Milan to London.

On 29 June 2016, all operations in the European mainland, as well as those services linking London with Europe, were sold to Flixbus. This left only domestic UK operations under the control of Stagecoach.

On 1 May 2017, Megabus commenced operating five services from London, Gatwick Airport and Heathrow Airport to the West of England. These were operated by South Gloucestershire Bus & Coach. Stagecoach purchased the South Gloucestershire Bus & Coach business in September 2019 and integrated it into its Stagecoach West subsidiary.

In October 2017, Megabus began the M39 service, running from Aberystwyth to Birmingham, via Welshpool and Shrewsbury. This service is operated by Mid Wales Travel.

=== Decline and closure ===
In March 2018, the Advertising Standards Authority banned Megabus from using adverts promising £1 fares as few seats were available at this price. Megabus' response was to withdraw the £1 fares altogether, leading some passengers to note that the ASA's decision has worked to the detriment of Megabus customers.

In August 2022, as part of the Stagecoach Group sale to DWS, it was agreed that Megabus' retail activities (the sale and marketing of tickets) would be sold to Scottish Citylink. An earlier proposed sale of Stagecoach to National Express would have seen Megabus sold in its entirety to ComfortDelGro. Scottish Citylink is a longstanding joint venture between Stagecoach Group and ComfortDelGro, which also took over Falcon at the same time. Contracts to operate Megabus services are still held mainly by Stagecoach subsidiaries.

In October 2024, Megabus announced that it was ceasing all routes running within England and Wales from 4 December due to low passenger demand, with only England-Scotland cross-border services, as well as the Falcon coach route from Bristol to Plymouth, being retained.

In December 2025, Megabus's two remaining long-distance routes in England, services M11 (Glasgow – London via Manchester) and M20 (Glasgow – London via Edinburgh, Newcastle, and Leeds) were withdrawn without explanation, with Megabus now linking customers to purchase National Express tickets on these routes.

== Other operations ==
=== Megabusplus ===

Megabusplus services combined Megabus and Megatrain for through journeys. It was launched on 30 March 2009.

==== North of England ====
As at August 2019, Megabusplus services use coaches to East Midlands Parkway station, then Megatrain (East Midlands Railway) services to London St Pancras. Even though Stagecoach ceased operating rail services in August 2019, when East Midlands Trains was superseded by East Midlands Railway, services continue to operate as of May 2021.

Services previously operated from York but ceased in 2017 when Megabus entered a through ticketing agreement with Yorkshire Coastliner.

==== South West England ====
Megabusplus services also used coaches to Southampton Airport Parkway station, then Megatrain (South West Trains) to Bournemouth.

In 2014, further Megabusplus services were launched using South West Trains services between London Waterloo and Honiton, then the following four coach routes from Honiton:

- Honiton – Okehampton – Bude
- Honiton – Collumpton – Tiverton – Barnstaple
- Honiton – Exeter Airport – Newton Abbot – Torquay – Paignton – Totnes – Plymouth
- Honiton – Launceston – Bodmin – St Austell – Truro – Penzance

=== Sleeper and Gold services ===
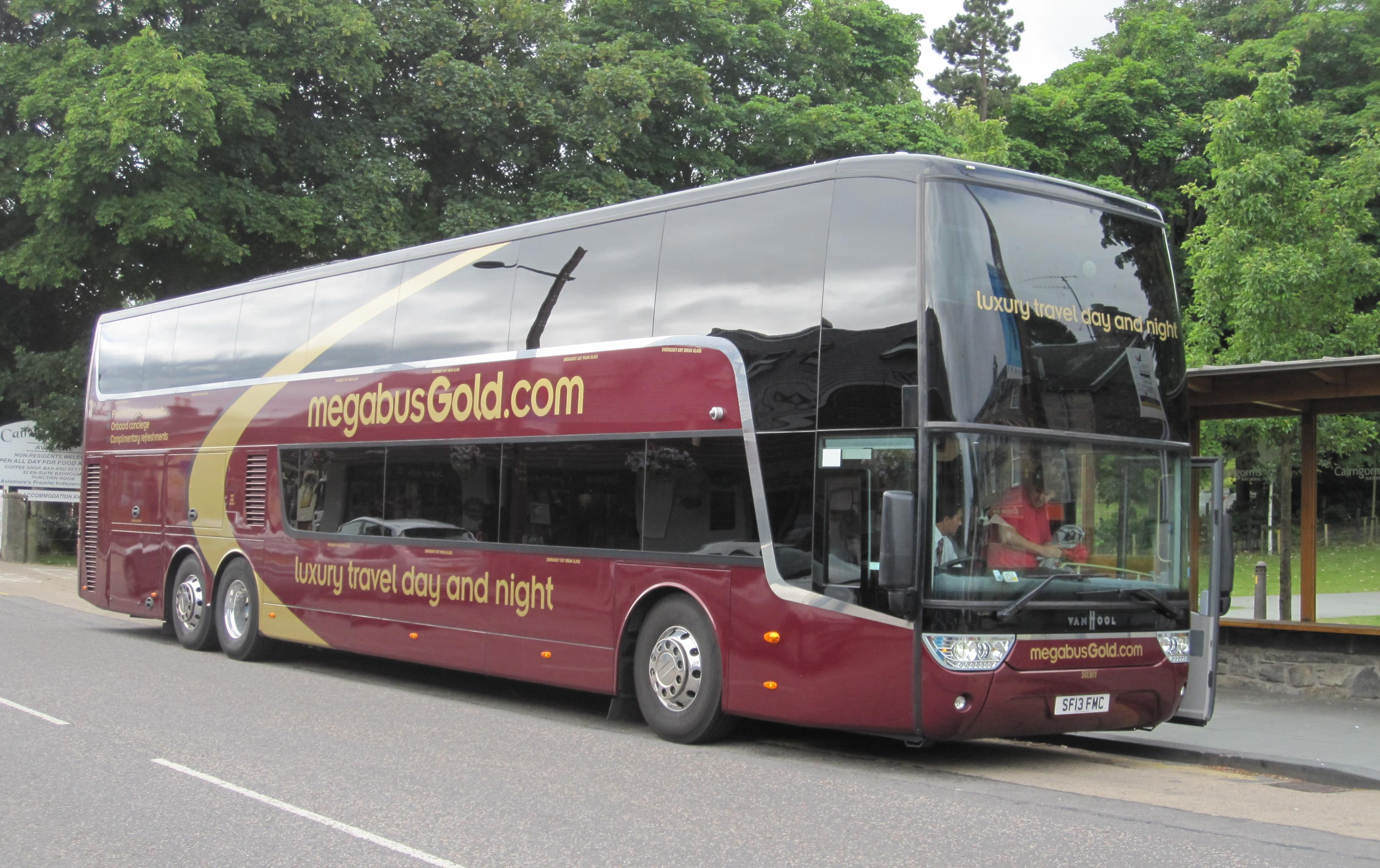
megabusGold.com double deck Van Hool coach in burgundy and gold livery

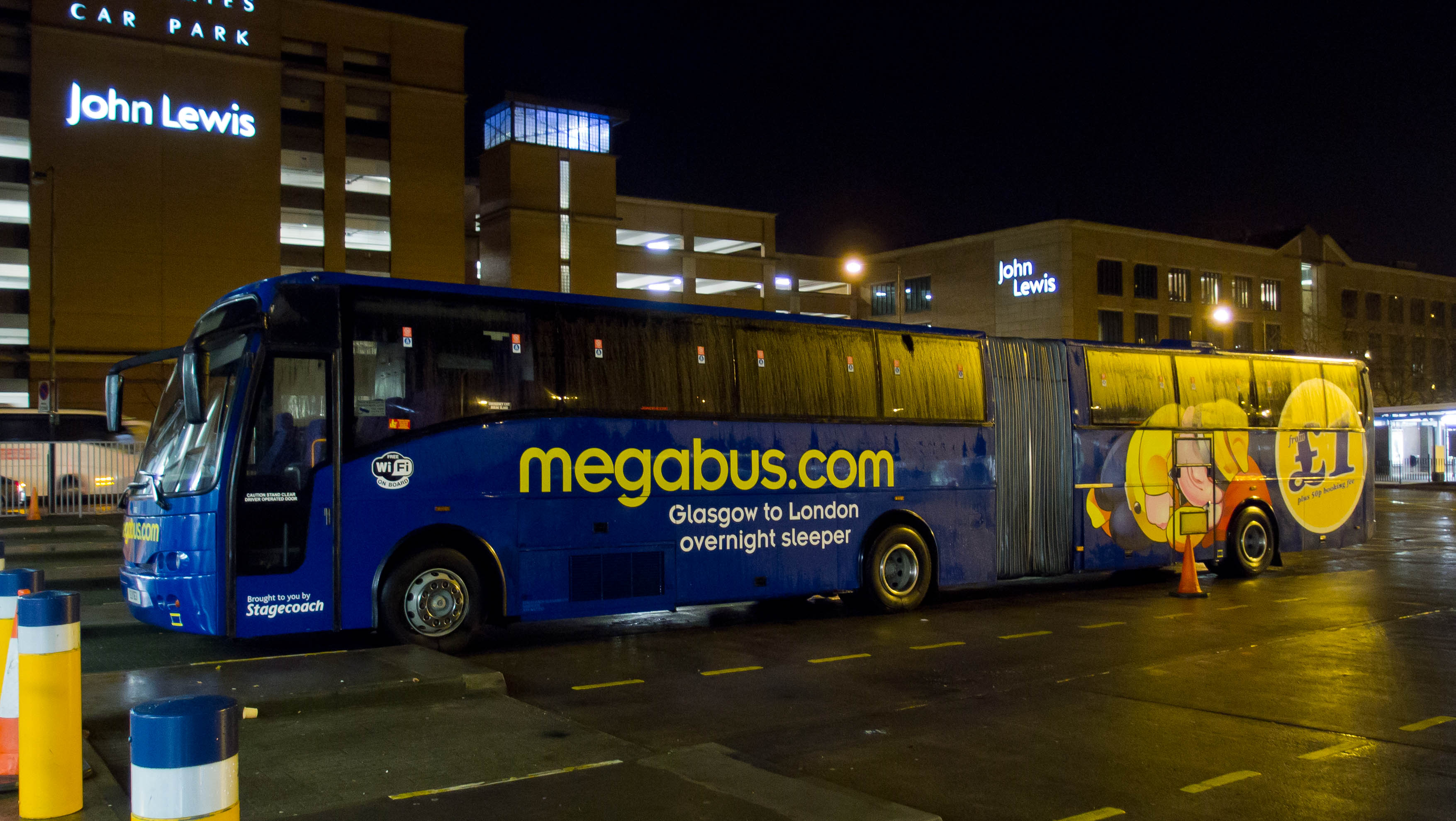
Jonckheere bodied Volvo B10MA sleeper coach at Buchanan bus station in February 2012

Overnight sleeper services were introduced on the London to Glasgow route in 2011, using Jonckheere Mistral articulated coaches with a flat bunk bed as well as a seat for each passenger.

Luxury Megabus Gold coaches were introduced from 8 July 2013 on selected sleeper services between London and Edinburgh/Aberdeen, as well as some day services. This sub-brand is in line with the upmarket Stagecoach Gold and Citylink Gold brands already used by Stagecoach subsidiaries. This service ended in May 2017, due to it being consistently loss-making, and the coaches are now only used on daytime services.

=== Megasightseeing ===
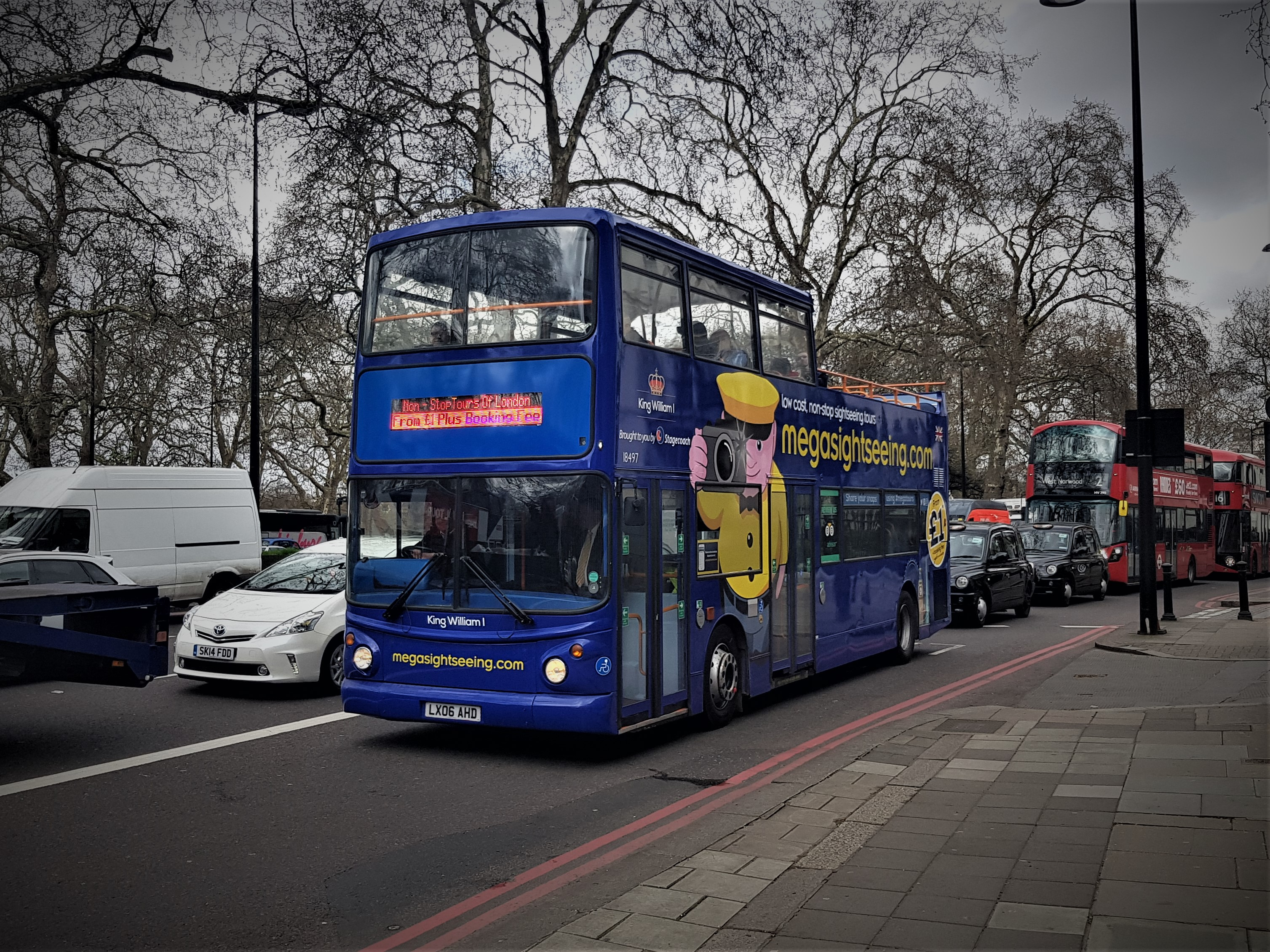
Alexander ALX400 bodied Dennis Trident on Park Lane

On 23 April 2018, Megabus, along with Stagecoach London, started operating three non-stop open top bus sight seeing routes in London under the Megasightseeing brand. Each trip on the route was approximately two hours long, and used a GPS activated pre-recorded 'guide'. The three circular routes, which ran hourly on the hour started from Tower of London, The London Eye, and Park Lane. Tickets for the service were pre-booked from the Megabus website, and cash was not accepted at the roadside, however, bookings could be made for a particular journey right up to the time of departure, subject to availability. Megasightseeing was the only non-stop sightseeing service in London.

Each sightseeing trip on the service carried up to 44 passengers. By reducing the number of bookings per trip, a top deck seat could be guaranteed, something other sightseeing operators in London are unable to offer at the present time.

The buses initially used on the service were former East London and Selkent 2005/06 Alexander ALX400 bodied Dennis Tridents. These vehicles were refurbished and converted to open and part open top by Alexander Dennis. They were housed at Bow bus garage. To comply with the London low emission zone, all were replaced by Alexander Dennis Enviro400s in 2019.

For the first time since Megabus was founded, 'Sid' the Megabus mascot, was given a voice (provided by Irish comedian Dara Ó Briain) – which could be heard in the automatic commentary on the vehicles whilst they were in motion on the tour.

On 9 June 2018, a Megasightseeing bus strayed in to a demonstration in Trafalgar Square in support of the far-right leader Tommy Robinson. The bus was overtaken by protesters and a significant amount of damage occurred to the vehicle, which resulted in it needing to be towed away.

In May 2021, Megasightseeing services were withdrawn and replaced by City Sightseeing services jointly operated by Stagecoach and Julià Travel on behalf of the company. The same Alexander Dennis Enviro400 vehicles that were used on the Megasightseeing service were repainted into City Sightseeing livery.

== Fleet ==
The Megabus fleet was normally easily identifiable, with the megabus.com name on the front and sides in yellow on a blue base and the Megabus logo on the left side of the coach (facing forward) and rear of the bus.

Accessible coaches were operated on routes between England and Wales, the M9 and M90 in Scotland, and the M20.

Vehicles were typically owned and maintained by various Stagecoach subsidiaries. When branded vehicles are unavailable other Stagecoach vehicles could be used or coaches hired in. Substitute vehicles used had been Dennis Trident 2 and Volvo Olympian double deckers, and Dennis Dart and Volvo B10M single deckers. Stagecoach London double deckers from Leyton garage were often seconded to Megabus until the sale of that company to Macquarie Bank. When using substitute vehicles, there may not always be an onboard toilet, and in such cases rest stops were made.

Some journeys were contracted to other operators using non-Megabus liveried vehicles, including Turners Coachways of Bristol, Tetleys of Leeds, Hamiltons of Uxbridge and Compass Royston from Stockton-on-Tees.

=== Fleet history ===
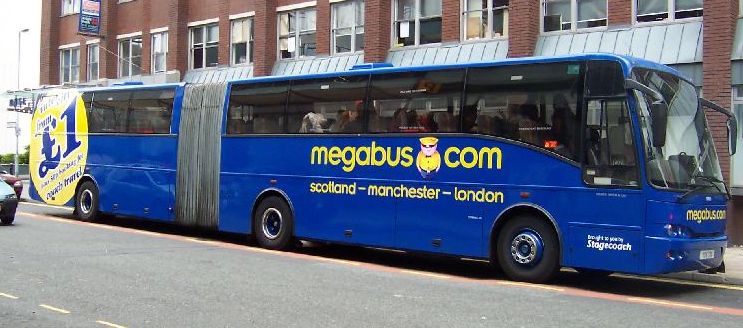
Jonckheere Modulo bodied Volvo B10M articulated coach in Manchester

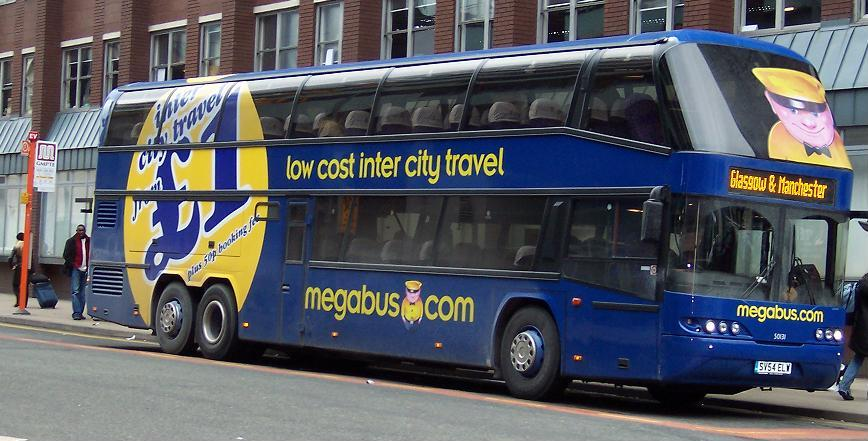
Neoplan Skyliner in Manchester

Initially, most routes used buses designed for short journeys that had neither toilet facilities nor luggage space, and each passenger was allowed only one bag.

To commence operations, 1990/91 built 3-axle 94 seat Alexander RH bodied Leyland Olympians were purchased from Hong Kong Citybus. Stagecoach had previously owned these buses when it owned Citybus from March 1999 until June 2003.

Three-axle Dennis Dragons were allocated to Manchester to Liverpool and Manchester to Leeds services, which ceased operations in 2004.

Mid-life Volvo B10M coaches temporarily operated various routes, mainly in the South of England, until sufficient Olympians had been prepared for service. Gradually, most of these coaches were taken off Megabus work and used by Stagecoach elsewhere. However, the type made a reappearance at the end of 2005, when they became the mainstays on the services from London to Birmingham and London to Nottingham/Chesterfield.

Newer 'high-frills' articulated coaches, with both toilets and reclining seats, were used for the longer journeys between London and Scotland, but these were replaced early in 2005. These coaches have since been refurbished and modified to include beds for an Overnight 'Sleeper' service between London and Glasgow started in late 2011, competing with the Caledonian Sleeper train.

In summer 2004, Stagecoach received a batch of Neoplan Skyliners for the Oxford Tube. This displaced 68-seat five-year-old double deck Jonckheere bodied MAN 24.350 HOCLNR-NL coaches, some of which were transferred to Megabus on cross-border services and on services within Scotland.

Stagecoach ordered another batch of Neoplan Skyliners, which entered service with Megabus in early 2005. These replaced the articulated coaches used between London and Scotland, and also Leyland Olympians on some other longer distance services.

In October 2006, Stagecoach ordered 45 Plaxton Panther bodied Volvo B12BT 15-metre 65 seat coaches. The three-axle coaches were the longest rigid vehicles in the UK on their introduction to service in February 2007, and the first of their kind to be built in Britain.

In September 2009, Megabus took delivery of four new Van Hool Astromega double-deck coaches, currently used between London and Scotland via Manchester

In October 2011, Megabus started an overnight sleeper service with 24 seats and bunks, between London and Glasgow. In November 2011 it started running daily and has proved to be very popular. The coaches used were modified Volvo B10M articulated coaches with Jonckheere bodywork. Despite its popularity, Megabus withdrew this service in 2017.

In early 2013, Megabus introduced new Plaxton Elite i coaches, built upon the Volvo B11RT chassis, into the fleet, running mainly on routes M9, M20 and the 900 (on behalf of Scottish Citylink).

In March and April 2018, nine former Selkent and East London Alexander ALX400 bodied Tridents were refurbished by Alexander Dennis in preparation for the new Megasightseeing Tours in London.

== Incidents ==
- In March 2010, a Megabus vehicle on an overnight service hit the body of a woman who had jumped from a bridge onto the M74 motorway. The driver failed to stop at the scene and was later suspended.
- In July 2012, a suspected terrorist was thought to be on board a Megabus service which was stopped by armed police on the M6 Toll motorway near Weeford, but it turned out to be a false alarm caused by smoke from an e-cigarette.
- In June 2013, a Megabus vehicle caught fire on the M62 motorway near Rastrick. All passengers and the driver escaped without injury.
