= Megatrain =

UK low-cost train operator

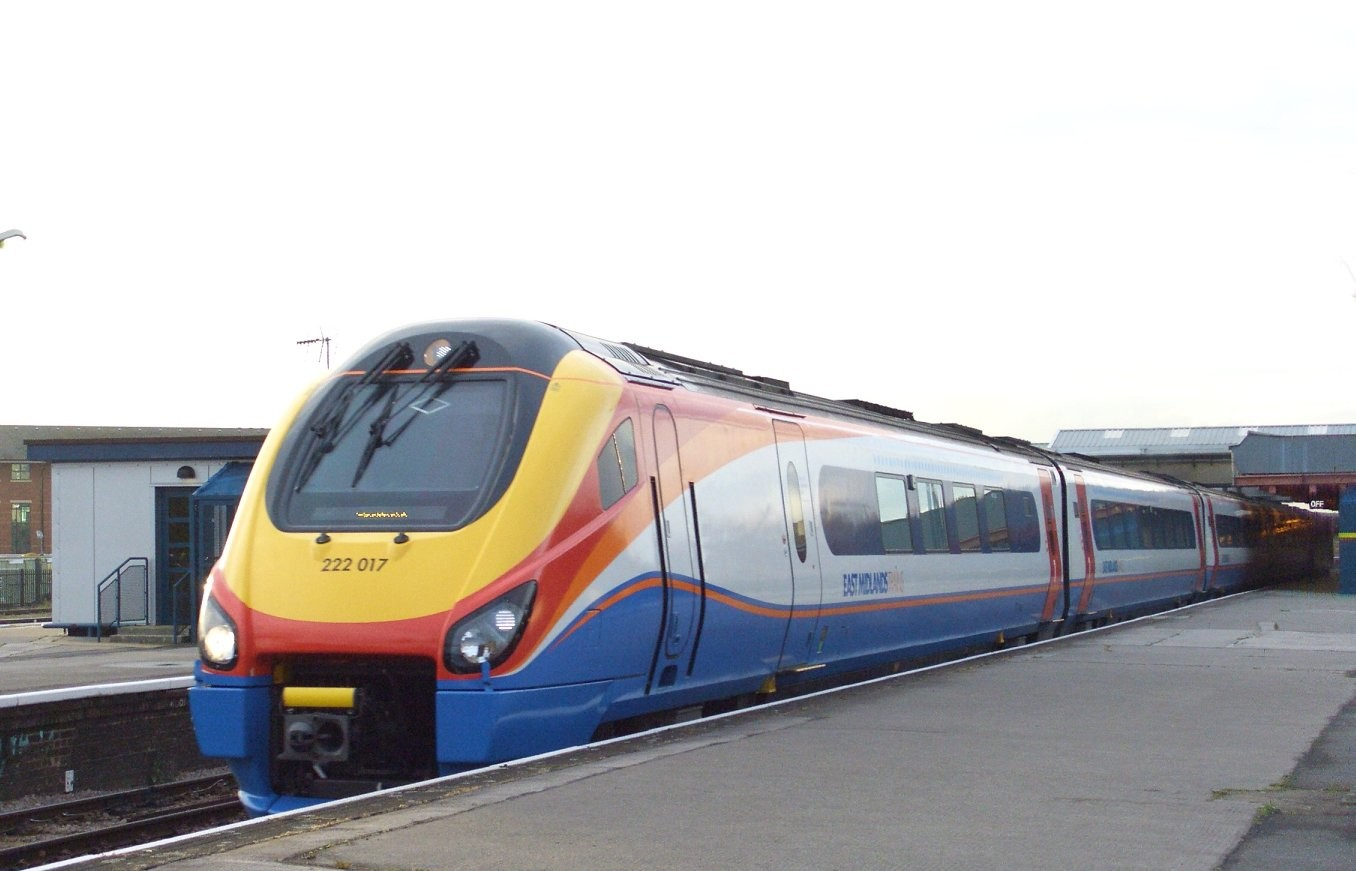
- Franchises: Integrated into East Midlands Trains; South West Trains; Virgin CrossCountry; Virgin Trains West Coast
- Main Towns: Sheffield, Nottingham
- Other Towns: London, Chesterfield, Leicester, Loughborough
- Parent company: Stagecoach Group

Other
- Website: uk.megabus.com/products/megatrain

Megatrain was a provider of low-cost train travel in the United Kingdom. A subsidiary of the Stagecoach Group, its operations have been associated with its parent's East Midlands Trains, South West Trains, Virgin CrossCountry and Virgin Trains West Coast train operating companies. Even though Stagecoach ceased operating train franchises in its own right in August 2019, Megatrain services continued to operate on East Midlands Railway services. In May 2024 Megabus confirmed they were no longer offering the Megatrain service.

== Service overview ==
Megatrain tickets were available on specific services operated by East Midlands Railway. The available services are those that are generally not busy with tickets priced using the yield management model employed by low-cost airlines and sister company Megabus, where the lowest fares were offered to those who book early or on less popular journeys.

In addition to the point-to-point rail fares of Megatrain, Megabusplus provided combined rail and coach journeys between London and Yorkshire. East Midlands Railway services from London St Pancras connect with Stagecoach in Lincolnshire coach services to Huddersfield and Hull at East Midlands Parkway.

Prices were advertised as starting at £1, with a 50p booking fee. Tickets must be purchased in advance, via the Megabus website or by telephone. Megatrain tickets are available Monday to Saturday only, and not on Sundays or public holidays.

== History ==
Megatrain was launched by Stagecoach on 14 November 2005, being piloted on two South West Trains routes, from London Waterloo to Portsmouth and Southampton from 14 November 2005 with ticket prices ranging from £1 to £19. Standard timetabled services by South West Trains initially had designated areas for Megatrain customers.

On 20 April 2006, Megatrain was extended to Bournemouth and Weymouth followed on 28 April 2006 by London Waterloo to Salisbury, Bath Spa, Bristol Temple Meads, Yeovil Junction, Exeter Central and Exeter St Davids. From 3 July 2006, Megatrain tickets were available on Virgin CrossCountry services from Birmingham New Street to Bournemouth, Bristol Temple Meads to Penzance, Manchester Piccadilly to Glasgow Central, Manchester Piccadilly to Edinburgh Waverley and Morpeth to Edinburgh Waverley.

On 6 March 2007,The Times reported that only 1 in 900 of the passengers carried by either South West Trains or Virgin CrossCountry bought a Megatrain low-fare ticket. The CrossCountry routes were withdrawn on 10 November 2007 when the CrossCountry franchise passed to Arriva CrossCountry.

On 2 January 2008, the Megatrain concept was extended to certain rail services on the East Midlands Trains franchise, with the introduction of Megatrain between London St Pancras and Sheffield and Nottingham. On 14 July 2008, Megatrain tickets were made available on certain Virgin Trains West Coast services from Birmingham New Street to Glasgow Central and Edinburgh Waverley.

On 5 January 2009 Megatrain was introduced between Sheffield and Norwich. On 20 March 2009 Megabusplus tickets offering for combined coach and train journeys from London via East Midlands Parkway railway station were introduced. Three feeder coach routes were provided to Halifax, Hull and York operated by Stagecoach in Lincolnshire with Volvo B10Ms.

Operation of the South West Trains services ceased on 4 August 2017 coinciding with a closure at London Waterloo and reduction in service levels. The South Western franchise was taken over by South Western Railway a few weeks later.

== Routes ==
=== Former (EMR) ===
Route	Start date	Train operating company	Notes
London St Pancras - Leicester - Loughborough - Derby - Chesterfield - Sheffield	2 January 2008	East Midlands Railway	East Midlands Parkway (with connecting Megabusplus services to Yorkshire) added 20 March 2009
London St Pancras - Leicester - Loughborough - Nottingham	2 January 2008	East Midlands Railway	Replacement for Megabus route M13

=== Former ===
Route	Start date	End date	Train operating company	Notes
London Waterloo - Portsmouth & Southsea - Portsmouth Harbour	14 November 2005	4 August 2017	South West Trains
London Waterloo - Southampton Central - Bournemouth - Poole - Weymouth	14 November 2005	4 August 2017	South West Trains	Extended to Bournemouth, Poole and Weymouth 20 April 2006
London Waterloo- Salisbury - Yeovil Junction - Axminster - Honiton - Exeter Central - Exeter St Davids	28 April 2006	August 2017	South West Trains	Axminster and Honiton included 29 October 2007
London Waterloo - Salisbury - Bath Spa - Bristol Temple Meads	28 April 2006	August 2017	South West Trains
Bristol Temple Meads - Penzance	3 July 2006	10 November 2007	Virgin CrossCountry
Birmingham New Street - Southampton Central - Bournemouth	3 July 2006	10 November 2007	Virgin CrossCountry
Manchester Piccadilly - Edinburgh Waverley	3 July 2006	10 November 2007	Virgin CrossCountry
Manchester Piccadilly - Glasgow Central	3 July 2006	10 November 2007	Virgin CrossCountry	Partially reinstated in 2008 by Virgin Trains West Coast with one early morning journey and one late evening journey, which have since stopped running
Morpeth - Edinburgh Waverley	3 July 2006	10 November 2007	Virgin CrossCountry
Manchester Piccadilly - Glasgow Central	January 2008	January 2009	Virgin Trains West Coast	One journey each direction
Birmingham New Street - Edinburgh Waverley	14 July 2008		Virgin Trains West Coast
Birmingham New Street - Glasgow Central	14 July 2008		Virgin Trains West Coast
London Euston - Coventry - Birmingham New Street	2009		Virgin Trains West Coast
Sheffield - Chesterfield - Nottingham - Peterborough - Norwich	5 January 2009		East Midlands Trains
