= Shearings =

British coach tour operator, owned by Leger

Shearings Travel Limited

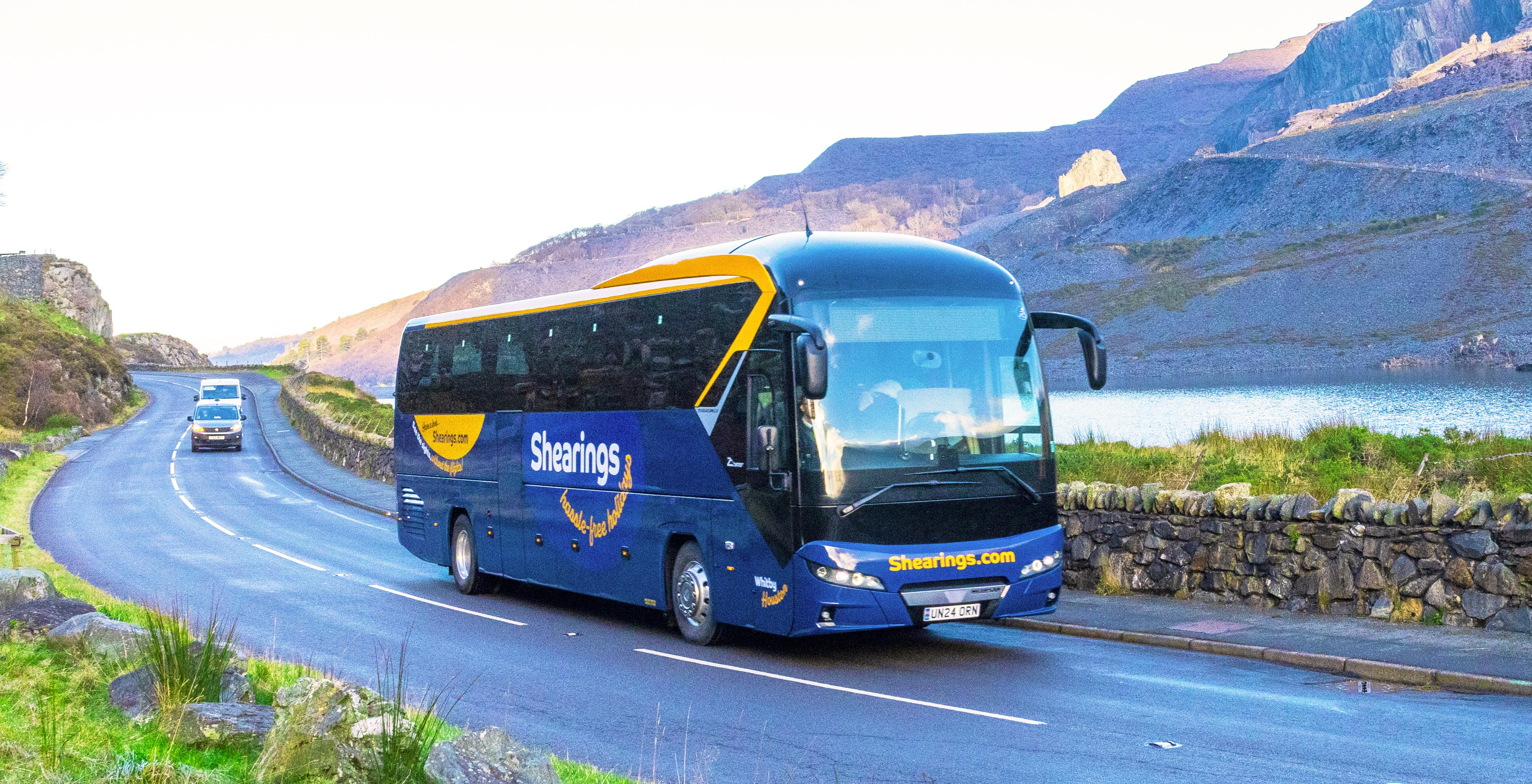
- Shearings Neoplan Tourliner passing Llyn Peris in December 2024
- Formerly: Shearings Tours (1919–1963); Shearings-Pleasureways-Ribblesdale (1964–1979); Shearings Ribblesdale (1979–1982); Shearings Holidays (1982–2006; 2007–2020); WA Shearings (2006–2007); Shearings Travel (2020–)
- Parent: Happiway Tours (1953–57); Jackson's of Altrincham (1964–1984); Associated Leisure (1984); Pleasurama/Mecca Leisure Group (1987–1990); Rank Organisation (1990–1996); 3i (2005–2014); Lone Star Funds (as Specialist Leisure Group 2014–2020); Leger Shearings Group (2020–)
- Founded: 1919; 2020 as part of Leger
- Defunct: 2020 (as separate company)
- Service type: Coach holidays and Escorted Tours

Shearings (legally Shearings Travel Limited) is a coach tour operator, part of the Leger Shearings Group, based in the United Kingdom. The tour operator brand specialises in holidays including escorted tours, unescorted tours, short breaks, self-drive holidays and river cruises throughout the United Kingdom, Isle of Man, Ireland and Continental Europe.

Founded in 1919, in Oldham, Greater Manchester by Herbert Shearing, the brand has been transferred between various owners in the late 20th century. Shearings bought Smiths Happiways in 1984, which can be traced back to 1903.

From 2014, Shearings Holidays was owned by Lone Star Funds-backed Specialist Leisure Group, until the group collapsed into administration during the outbreak of the COVID-19 pandemic in May 2020. In June 2020, Leger Holidays announced their purchase of the Shearings brand, website, and customer database, but all other Shearings assets were not purchased at the time.

== Current brand operations ==
The brand operates tours to various destinations throughout the British Isles and Continental Europe.

== History ==
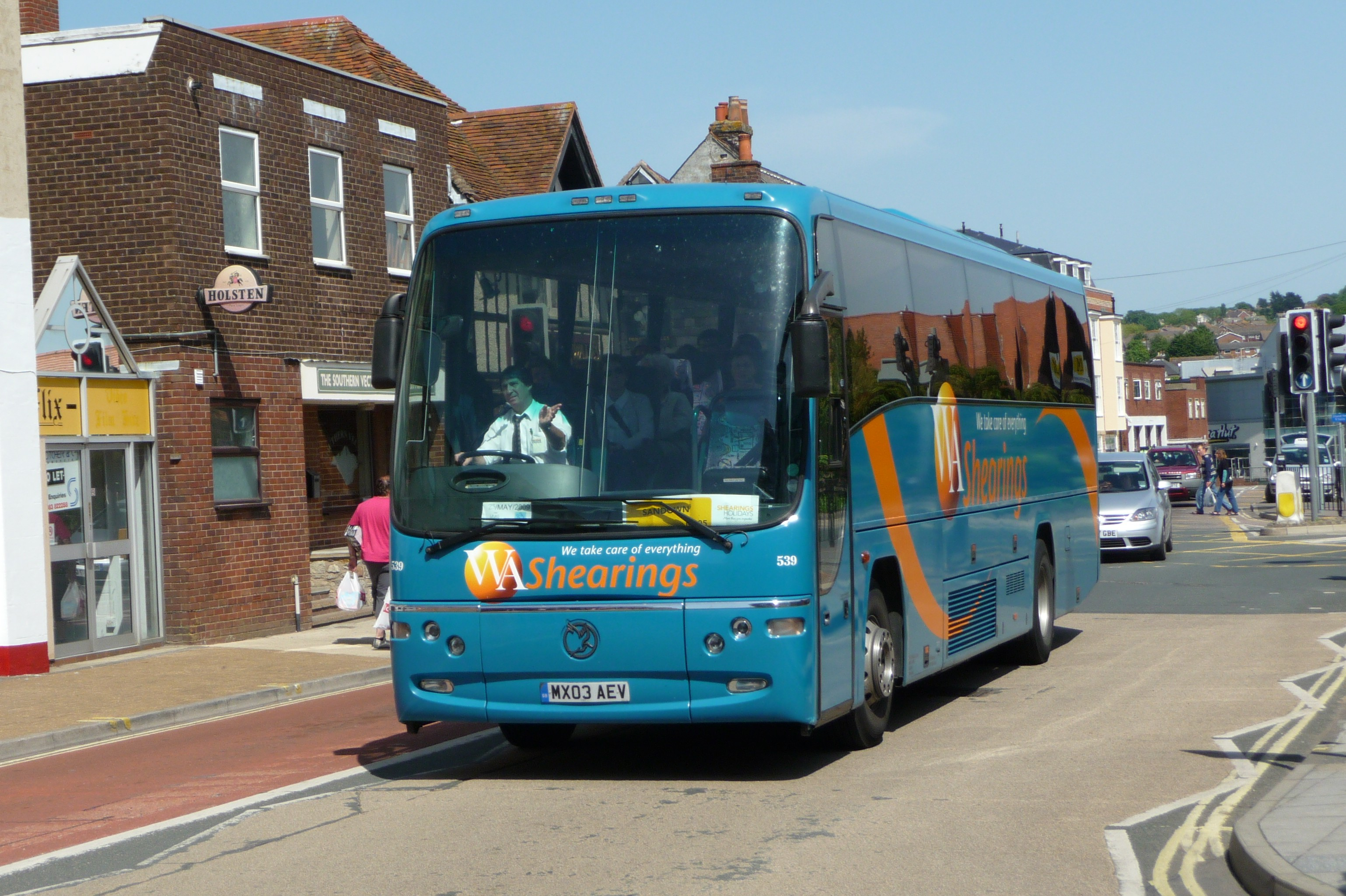
Plaxton Panther bodied Volvo B12M on the Isle of Wight in May 2009 in WA Shearings livery

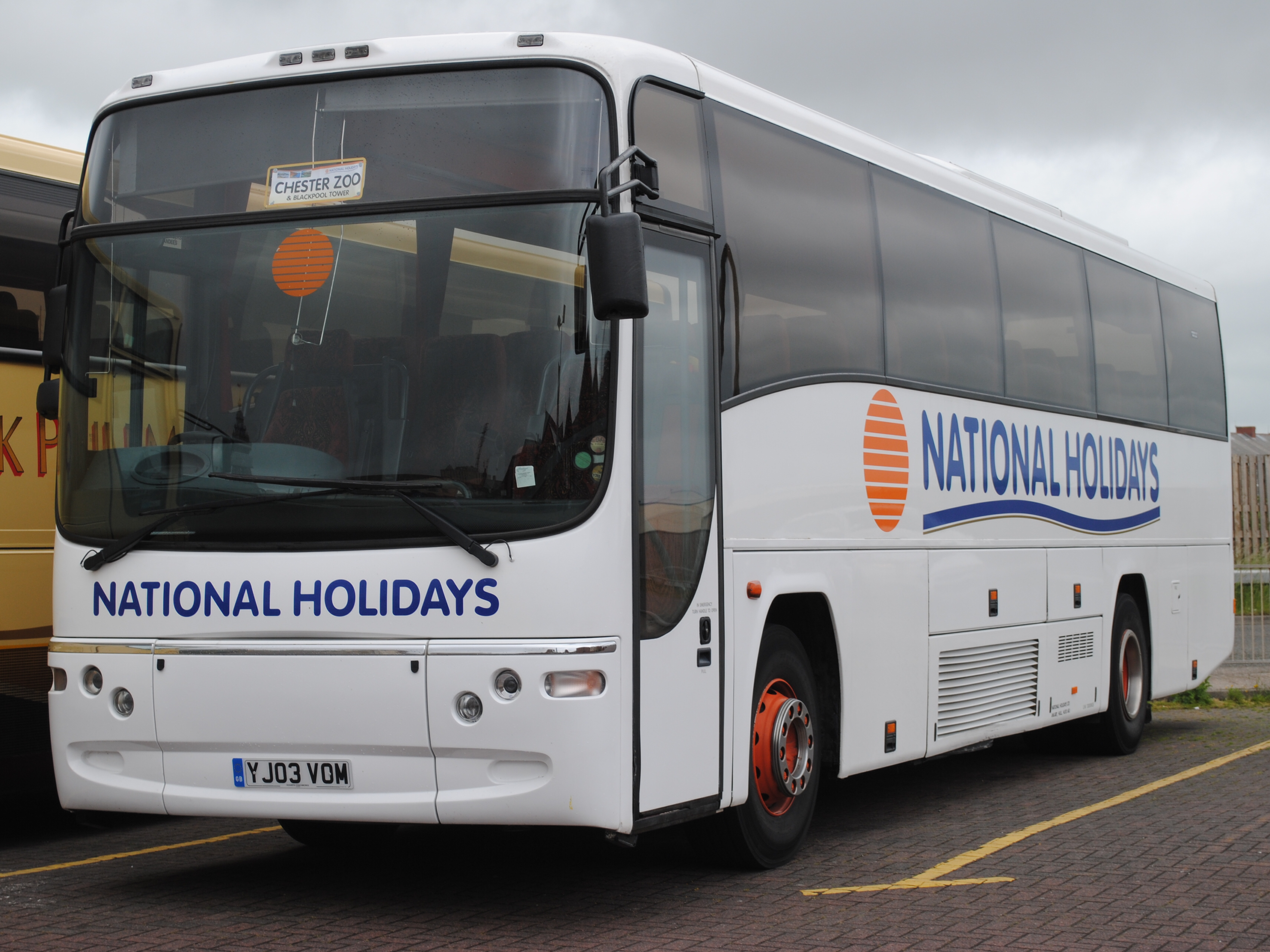
Plaxton Paragon bodied Volvo B12M in Blackpool in June 2013 in National Holidays livery

Prior to Leger's purchase in 2020, Shearings was an amalgamation of four separate companies: Smiths Happiways, Shearings, National Holidays and Wallace Arnold. It now operates as a travel brand of the Leger Shearings Group alongside Leger Holidays, Battlefield Tours and Holt Tours.

=== Origins ===
Shearings, which was founded in 1919, merged with Smiths Happiways in 1984, which can trace its history back to 1903.

Smiths Happiways

In 1903 William Webster commenced trading as a haulage and removals contractor and passenger carrier, offering coach transport, and by 1931, Webster Bros (Wigan) offered excursions and tours to North Wales and Manchester.

In 1914, James Smith began operating coach tours from Wigan and Southport. The first tour was to John o' Groats. Webster Bros purchased James Smith's coach business in 1931, and a new company, James Smith & Co (Wigan) Limited, was formed. By 1935, Webster Bros (Wigan) marketed 'Webster's Tours', operated by James Smith & Co.

The first tours to Continental Europe were offered in 1938, continuing up until the outbreak of World War II. Smiths claimed to be the first company to operate coach tours to Europe after the war, with a sell-out 14-day tour to Switzerland in May 1946. In 1947, the company carried 6,000 passengers, of which more than 10% travelled to mainland Europe.

In 1958, Smiths was purchased by Les Gleave, and renamed Smith's Tours (Wigan). Wilf Blundell of Southport purchased Smith's Tours from Gleave in 1964.

Blundell began his coach operation with just one coach in 1950, later purchasing Blundells Coaches (Southport) Limited in 1952, Enterprise Coaches in 1955, Poole's Coaches in 1958 and Tootle's Tours in 1960. This portfolio of companies formed Blundell Holiday Group.

Blundell purchased Spencer's Tours and Happiway Tours from Edwin Holden in 1968, merging both companies to form Happiway-Spencers. By 1975 Blundell's coaches were branded as Smiths Happiway-Spencers, and in 1980 the company Smiths Happiway-Spencers was formed, consolidating Blundell's coach operations.

The Blundell Group including Smiths Happiways-Spencers was in turn acquired in March 1982 by Associated Leisure Limited, after which the Spencer name was dropped with the company becoming Smiths Happiways.

Shearings

Shearings was founded in 1919 in Oldham by Herbert Shearing, who then took over Eniway Motor Tours in 1935, a company offering express coach transport between Manchester and London. On Herbert Shearing's retirement in 1949 two new companies were formed: Shearings Tours (Manchester) Limited and Shearings Tours (Oldham) Limited, which were sold to James Robinson, then owner of Happiway Tours in 1953.

Robinson sold Happiway Tours to Edwin Holden, who owned Spencers Tours in 1957, but kept the Shearings Tours companies, consolidating them as Shearings Holidays in 1963, before selling the company to the Jackson family of Altrincham in 1964. Jackson had purchased Pleasureways in 1955. Following an agreement to share resources and pick-up points with Ribblesdale of Blackburn, the coaches were branded as Shearings-Pleasureways-Ribblesdale, shortened to Shearings Ribblesdale in 1979 and then to Shearings Holidays in 1982.

Associated Leisure (who had acquired The Blundell Group including Smiths Happiways-Spencers in 1982) purchased Shearings Holidays in January 1984. Associated Leisure was in turn bought by Pleasurama in 1987, after which Pleasurama's coaches were first rebranded and then formally merged as Smiths Shearings.

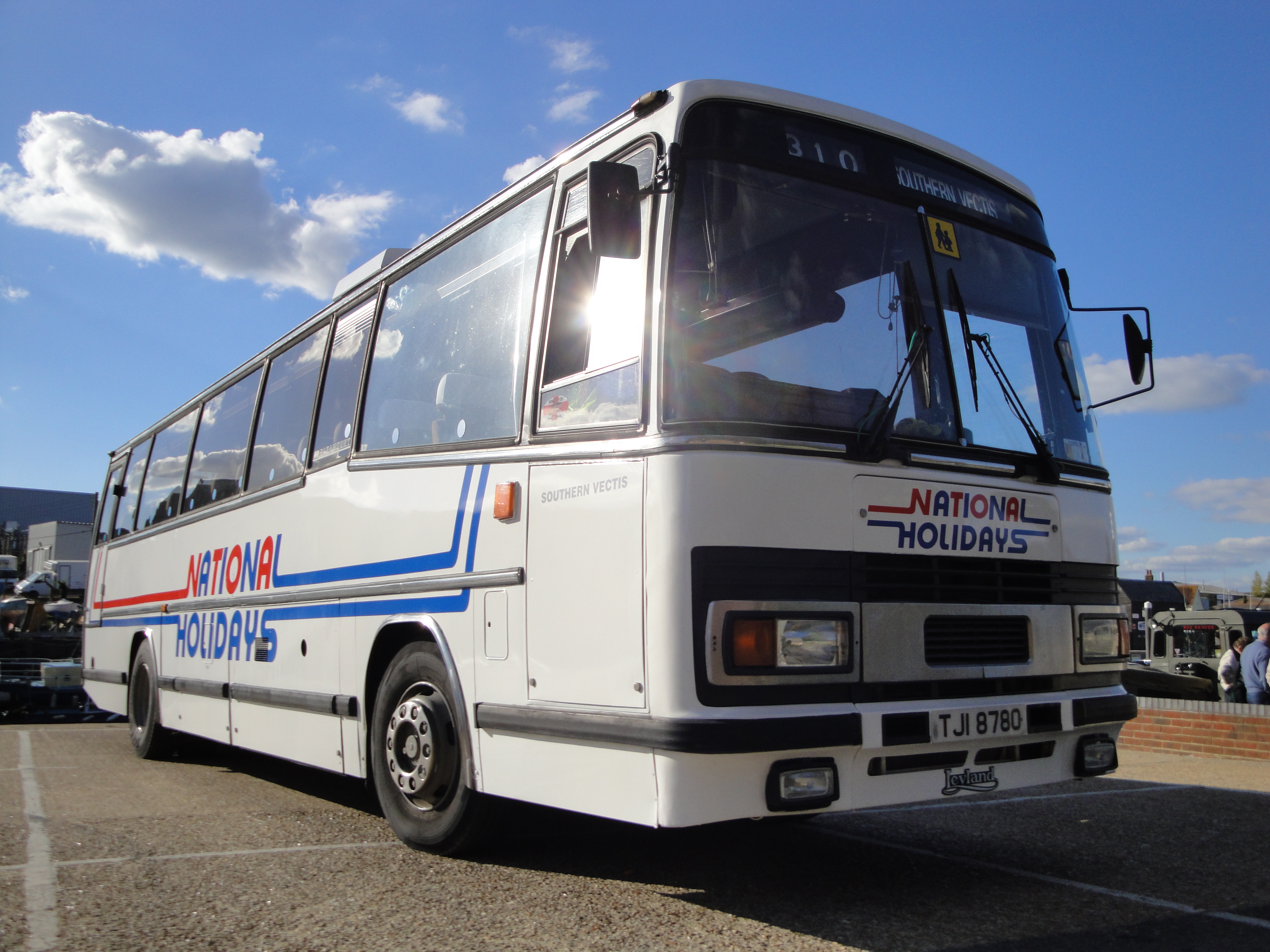
Preserved Plaxton Paramount bodied Leyland Tiger in original National Holidays livery in October 2010

The original National Holidays, which had been formed in 1976 to co-ordinate the coach activities of the state owned National Bus Company was purchased by Pleasurama in July 1986 as part of the privatisation of the National Bus Company, who then also purchased the business of Jenkins, Skewen in 1988. rebranding the National Holidays coaches as Shearings National the next year.

In 1989, Mecca Leisure Group purchased Pleasurama, dropping the Smiths name and subsequently merging National Holidays with Shearings. The Rank Organisation took over Mecca in 1990, adding the business of Eagle Coaches, Tunbridge Wells and Gwalia Coaches, Llandudno Junction the same year. Rank then sold Shearings Holidays to a management buyout in 1996, backed by Bridgepoint Capital.

3i, a venture capital firm that owned Wallace Arnold, purchased a controlling stake in Shearings in 2005 merging the former competitors first under the WA Shearings brand and then as Shearings Holidays. Eight Wallace Arnold Travel travel shops in Yorkshire were also briefly branded as WA Shearings before having their former name reinstated. The merger also brought with it a second National Holidays. This was the former East Yorkshire Travel, a subsidiary of the East Yorkshire bus company which had been renamed in 1997 and become part of the Wallace Arnold group in 2001.

3i and Indigo Capital sold the business to a management team in 2014 for an undisclosed figure, but which was less than 10% of business's £200m valuation back in 2005. At this time the company owned over 200 coaches, 52 hotels and offered coach, air, rail, cruise and hotels breaks to more than 170 destinations worldwide. This later became Specialist Leisure Group Limited which renamed itself Shearings Leisure Group Limited between 2016 and 2018, until reverting to their prior name. In April 2016, the business was purchased by Lone Star Funds, although it was reported the private equity firm has considered selling Specialist Leisure Group Limited on at least two prior occasions before later administration. The company's subsidiary Shearings Hotels Limited operated the Bay Hotels and Coast and Country Hotels brand.

=== Administration and purchase by Leger ===
Shearings' parent company Specialist Leisure Group (SLG), a hotel and leisure travel company, headquartered in Wigan and owned by Lone Star Funds, was placed in administration in May 2020. This followed attempts by the company to find a buyer in April 2020. Insolvency specialists from Ernst & Young were appointed as administrators, with debts calculated to be £200 million. Alongside Shearings Holidays, the company operated National Holidays, Caledonian Travel, UK Breakaways, Coast and Country Hotels, Bay Hotels, Country Living Hotels, UKBreakaways.com and Wallace Arnold Travel, all also ceasing trading. All holidays, tours, and hotel bookings with SLG were cancelled and not rescheduled.

The company stated the COVID-19 pandemic had "significantly impacted" the business, whereas ABTA – The Travel Association stated the company would have likely struggled with thousands of refunds for cancelled trips in lockdown and a slowdown of new bookings. At the time of administration, SLG had 240 coaches, 2,460 employees and 44 hotels. 64,000 bookings were cancelled, with the "vast majority" being coach package holidays.

In June 2020, Leger Holidays acquired the brand of the former company, as well as its customer database and website, but not the coaches, former employees or hotels of the former company. Leger stated they are "bringing the iconic Shearings name back to life" and that they will offer a new programme of coach holidays in the UK and Europe. Leger stated their plans for launching thirty UK tours in 2021 during the 2020 purchase.

== Operations as a separate company ==
In their 2020 deal, Leger only purchased the brand, website and customer database, all other assets of the former company were not purchased at the time.

Prior to administration in 2020, Shearings Holidays Limited comprised Shearings Holidays, Bay Hotels, Coast & Country Hotels, value brand National Holidays, Scottish tour operator Caledonian Travel and Wallace Arnold Travel.

Shearings' hotels division was based at its registered office, in Tarbet, Loch Lomond, Scotland, G83 7DE. In October 2013, Shearings owned 49 properties across England, Scotland and Wales operated under the Bay Hotels and Coast & Country brands.

Bay Hotels were focused around the communal holiday experience, often with cabaret entertainment. Coast & Country had all been upgraded to at least three-star standard, and offer a more relaxed atmosphere, often with additional facilities such as swimming pools, saunas, fitness rooms and Jacuzzis. Shearings also worked with a wide variety of hoteliers across the UK and Europe, from small family-run hotels to large chains. The company had a particularly close relationship with the Hotel Britannia Excelsior in Lake Como, with whom Shearings worked for many years. Shearings offered all-inclusive holidays at this hotel all year round.

Over recent years, Shearings grew its river cruise programme. By 2013, the company exclusively chartered five river cruise vessels: the MPS Rotterdam, the MPS Da Vinci, the MV Virginia, the MV Esmeralda and the MS Serenade II. Shearings also sold onto other operators' river cruises.

By April 2016, the former independent operator had a fleet consisted of approximately 240 coaches. Until 1991 Shearings fleet purchases were Leyland Tigers after which it switched to Volvo B10Ms and later Volvo B12Ms. From 2009, the company purchased Setras, and from 2015, Mercedes-Benz Tourismo coaches in both twin and tri-axle variants, for both the Shearings and National Holidays fleets. This fleet was not purchased by Leger in 2020.
