= Leger Holidays =

British coach tour operator

Leger Holidays Limited

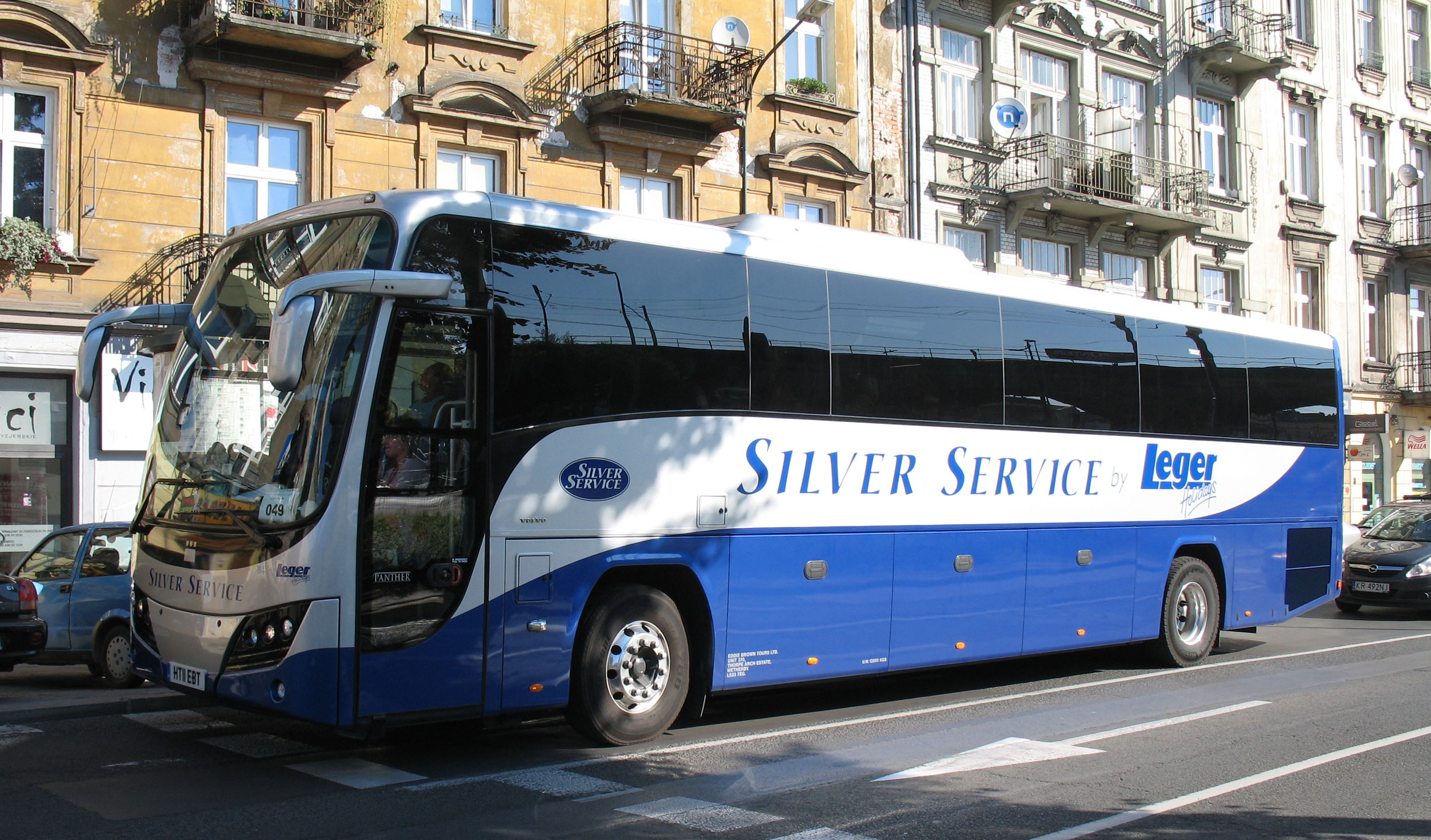
- Plaxton Panther coach with Volvo B9R chassis in Kraków, Poland
- Parent: Leger Shearings Group
- Founded: 1983
- Headquarters: Rotherham, South Yorkshire
- Service type: Coach holidays and Escorted Tours
- Destinations: British Isles, Continental Europe and some other destinations.
- Chief executive: Liam Race (Leger Shearings)
- Website: www.leger.co.uk

Leger Shearings Group
- Industry: Coach and escorted tours
- Predecessor: Sunway Travel (Coaching) Limited
- Headquarters: Rotherham, England
- Revenue: £34.9 million (2019)
- Owner: Ian and Kathleen Henry (70%); Liam Race, Andrew Oldfield and Chris Plummer (30%)
- Divisions: Leger Holidays; Shearings; Battlefield Tours; Holts Tours
- Website: www.legershearings.com

Leger Holidays is a coach tour operator based in Rotherham, England in the United Kingdom. It is part of the Leger Shearings Group, alongside Shearings, Battlefield Tours and Holts Tours. The company operates tours and holidays by coach, air or cruise to destinations in mainly in the United Kingdom, Ireland, and Continental Europe with some other international destinations. The company is reported to be the UK's largest escorted coach tours company.

== Overview and background ==
Leger started operating coach tour holidays between the United Kingdom and Continental Europe, from their base in Rotherham, South Yorkshire since 1983.

The parent company, as of 2022, is Leger Shearings Group which is 70% owned by Ian and Kathleen Henry, with the remaining 30% owned by company directors, Liam Race, Andrew Oldfield and Chris Plummer.

=== History ===
In 1993, the company received an investment from 3i, and was then sold to MyTravel in 2000 for £23.1 million. In 2002, the management of the company bought the company from MyTravel for £22.2 million backed also by 3i. With Sunway Travel forming Leger's parent company.

On 10 June 2007, a Leger Holidays coach crashed into a house in Middelkerke, Belgium, after potentially swerving to avoid conflict with a car. Four passengers were seriously injured, all taken to hospital shortly after, with one of them, a relief coach driver, having his arm partly amputated.

In September 2008, Leger bought Consort Travel for an undisclosed sum. It recorded a £30 million turnover at the time, with Consort recording £3 million.

In 2009, Leger introduced "eye-tracking" technology to their website, following customer research, studying the most and least-looked parts of the website.

In 2019, the company turned over £34.9 million. The company states it has won "Best Medium Coach Holiday Company" at the British Travel Awards for various years.

=== Purchase of Shearings ===
In June 2020, Leger Holidays acquired the brand of Shearings, a rival coach operator, as well as its customer database and website. The deal did not include Shearings' coaches, former employees or hotels. Leger stated they are "bringing the iconic Shearings name back to life" and that they will offer a new programme of coach holidays in the UK and Europe. Leger stated their plans for launching thirty UK tours in 2021 during the 2020 purchase. The announcement followed Shearings' parent company Specialist Leisure Group (SLG), being placed into administration in May 2020 due to the COVID-19 pandemic's impact on the travel industry.

In January 2021, Liam Race was appointed as Chief Executive of the Leger Shearings Group. The former holding company for Leger Holidays, Sunway Travel (Coaching) Limited was renamed Leger Shearings Group Limited in early 2021. In February 2021, the company reported bookings were reaching 220% more than February 2020, with Race stating "Sales have been incredible, we literally can’t answer the volume of calls we are receiving and we have drafted staff in from other areas of the business to try and attempt to answer them as quickly as possible".

On 25 October 2021, Leger restarted its European escorted coach tours programme, with the first five escorted coach tours departing on the day. This followed a 20-month hiatus of the company's tours due to the pandemic.

A September 2021 Which? survey ranked Leger 16th of 18 chosen escorted tour providers, with "lacklustre accommodation" as the company's weak point receiving a two-star rating of five for accommodation. However, the operator is particularly popular for its European battlefield itineraries, with their guides praised by one customer in the survey.

In January 2022, Leger Shearings announced they were on target to set a monthly sales record since the group was founded in mid-2020. January 2022's sales were 334% higher than January 2021. In February 2022, 20 new UK coach tours were added, a doubling from 2021. In April 2022, Leger announced a 5–10% increase in prices, as well as their reintroduction of tours for various 2023 European motorsport events since the pandemic. There was a short booking increase prior to the price rise.

== Destinations ==
The operator's 2022–2023 brochure, 70 tours and holidays were offered, ranging 8–22 days long, with single-traveller, festive, railway-related, floral and river cruises offered. With destinations including; Austria, Canada, France, India, Italy, Japan, New Zealand, Spain and the United States.

== Fleet ==
Leger Holidays offer three types of coach, an "Executive coach", a "Silver Service" and a "Luxuria" service. In May 2022, Leger increased its fleet of Luxuria coaches by four, increasing to a total of 11. The coaches are Scania Irizar i8s tri-axles, and were introduced in early June 2022. A further three Luxuria coaches were introduced in April 2022, ordered before the pandemic and from Edinburgh Coach Lines, Galleon Travel and Chiltern Travel companies.
