= Jonckheere =

Belgian bus manufacturer

- Industry: Automotive
- Founded: 1881
- Defunct: 2010
- Successor: VDL Bus & Coach
- Headquarters: Roeselare, Belgium
- Products: Buses
- Parent: VDL Groep
- Website: www.jonckheere.be

Jonckheere was a Belgian motor coach and bus manufacturer, founded in 1881 by Henri Jonckheere in Roeselare.

== History ==
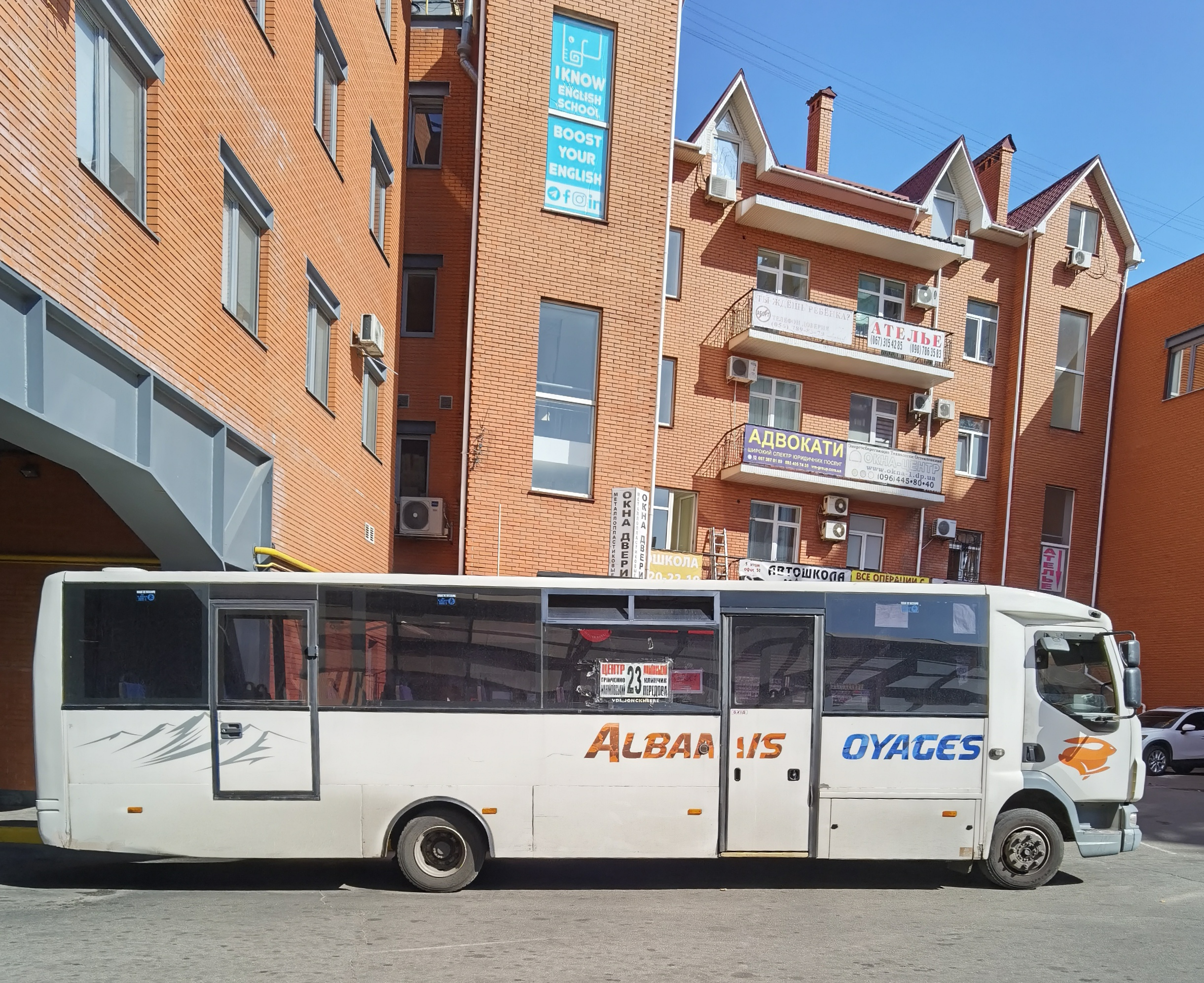
VDL Jonckheere 1LX119

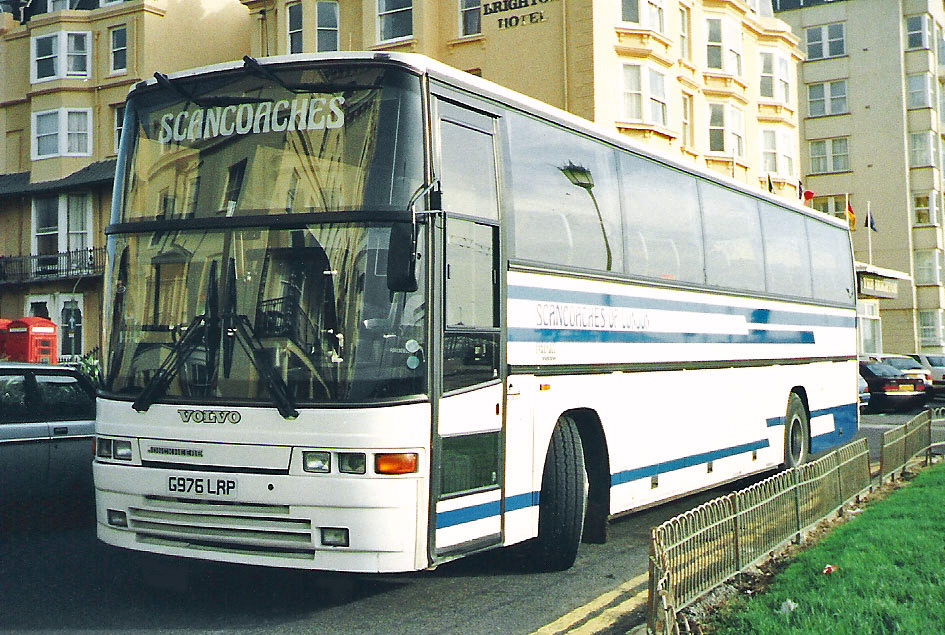
A 1990 Scancoaches of London Jonckheere Deauville bodied Volvo B10M

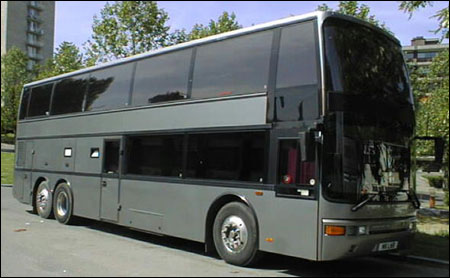
A Len Wright Band Services Jonckheere Monaco double-deck coach

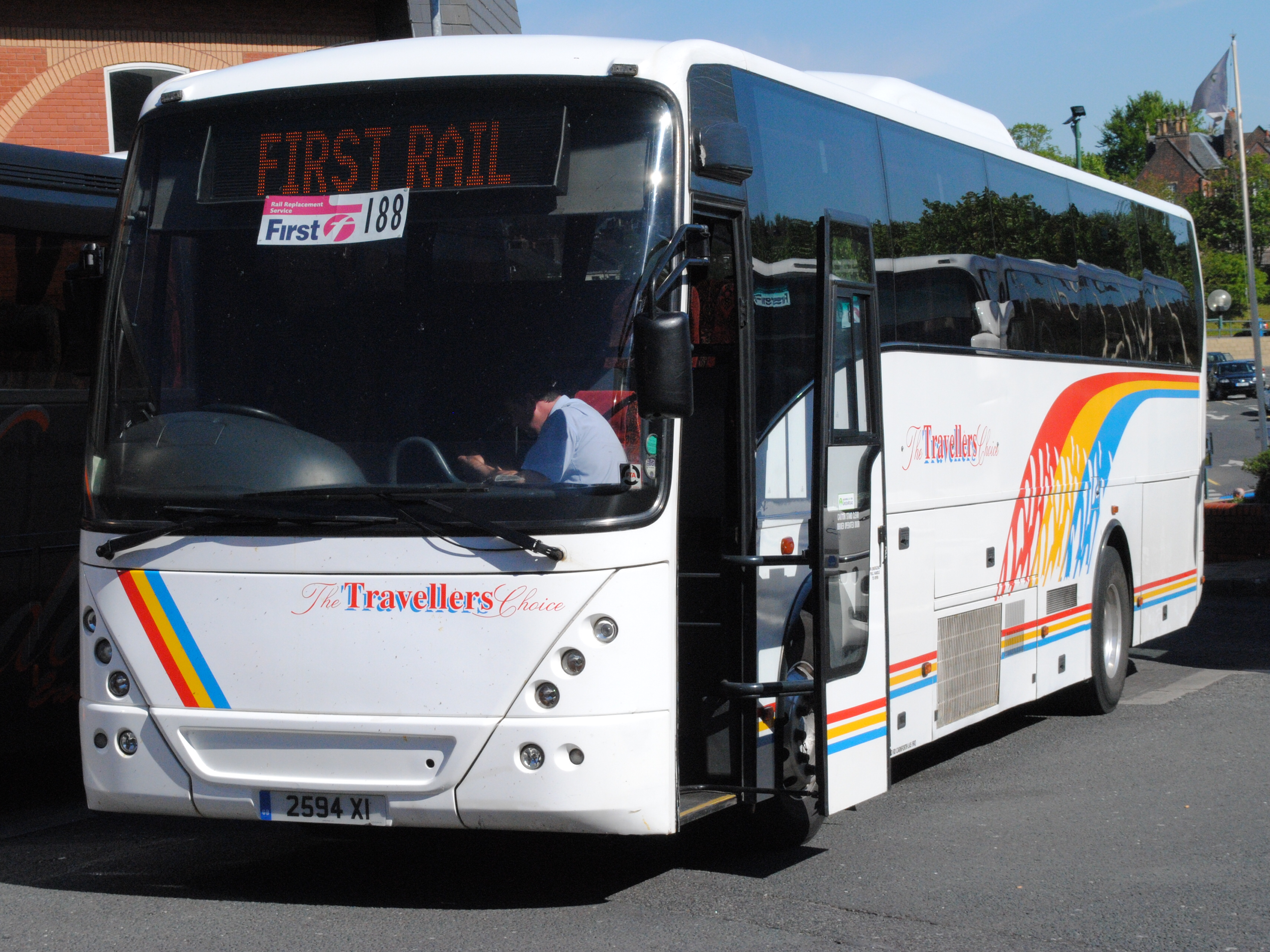
A 2002 Jonckheere Mistral bodied Volvo B12M

In 1881, Henri Jonckheere began building horse-drawn carriages in the village of Beveren, near Roeselare in the province of West Flanders, Belgium. In 1902 Jonckheere built his first "luxury automobile". In those days, many largely wooden bodies with typical styling were built upon several famous chassis, such as Minerva and Rolls-Royce.

In 1922, Henri's son and successor, Joseph Jonckheere, built his first bus body. Car bodies were still a large part of the production until the early 1930s, when Jonckheere moved all production to bus and coach building, making Jonckheere the Belgian market leader. Jonckheere was also becoming famous and well-known throughout Europe.

After World War II, a huge need emerged for road transport vehicles, including buses and coaches. Jonckheere was able to readily meet all new market trends. The product range included luxury touring coaches, city and intercity buses, articulated buses but also heavy duty buses for worldwide export and several special bodies. In the 1970s, Jonckheere launched the Bermuda range that started to appear in the United Kingdom in 1977 and remained in production until 1982.

Jonckheere celebrated its first century in 1981 with a touring coach carrying the appropriate name Jubilee. The range included a low floor P35 model, regular P50/P599 model, P799 with underfloor cockpit, P90 semi-decker with a rear lounge, P95 with an underfloor drivers cab and rear lounge, and P99 double decker. In 1989, Jonckheere launched the Deauville range. In 1994 came the Monaco double deck model.

In 1996, the Mistral touring coach model was launched (in two heights, Mistral 50 and 70). The Mistral remained in production until 2007, when it was replaced by the SH series.

In 1994, Jonckheere became a part of the Berkhof Group which was subsequently acquired by VDL Groep in 1998. The official name of Jonckheere was then changed to VDL Jonckheere.

A new high-specification coach was launched in Europe. The SH-series was initially available on the rear-engined Volvo B12B chassis. The demonstration model was built to a height of 3.8m. The body was also built on the Volvo B12M and Volvo B9R. Longer 14 metre versions were added to the range on the Volvo B12BT and B13R chassis.

In 2010, VDL Jonckheere was subsumed by VDL Bus & Coach.

== Products ==
- Bermuda
- Jubilee
- Deauville
- Monaco
- Arrow 30, 50, 70
- Mistral 30, 50, 70
- SHV
- JHV
- Modulo
- Croupe
