= Volvo B10M =

Bus chassis

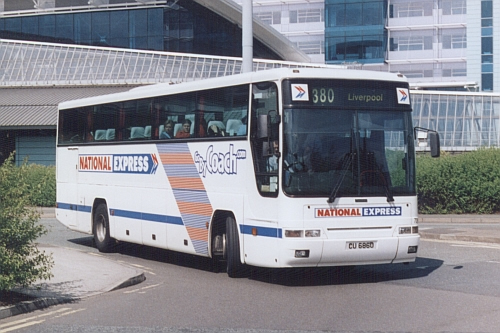
- National Express Plaxton Premiere-bodied B10M at Manchester Airport in April 2003

Overview
- Manufacturer: Volvo
- Production: 1978–2003
- Assembly: Sweden (1978-2002); United Kingdom (1990-2000); Brazil (1986-2003)

Body and chassis
- Class: Bus chassis
- Body style: Single-decker bus Single-decker articulated bus Single-decker intercity bus Double-decker bus
- Doors: 1-3
- Floor type: Step entrance

Powertrain
- Engine: 9.6-litre horizontally mid-mounted I-6; Volvo THD100, THD101, THD102, THD103, THD104, DH10A
- Capacity: 40 to 91 seated
- Transmission: SCG Pneumocyclic (B10MD); Voith DIWA 381.4; Voith DIWA 851.2; Voith DIWA 863.3; ZF 4HP 500; ZF 4HP 590; ZF 5HP 500; ZF 5HP 560

Dimensions
- Wheelbase: 4.60, 5.00, 5.50, 6.00, 6.25, 6.50, 7.00 metres
- Length: varies
- Height: varies

Chronology
- Predecessor: Volvo B58
- Successor: Volvo B12M

The Volvo B10M is a mid-engine city bus and coach chassis manufactured by Volvo between 1978 and 2003. It succeeded the B58 and was equipped with the same 9.6-litre horizontally mounted Volvo diesel engine mounted under the floor behind the front axle. An articulated bus version under the model name Volvo B10MA was also offered, as was a semi-integral version known as the C10M, with the engine in the middle of the chassis.

== History ==
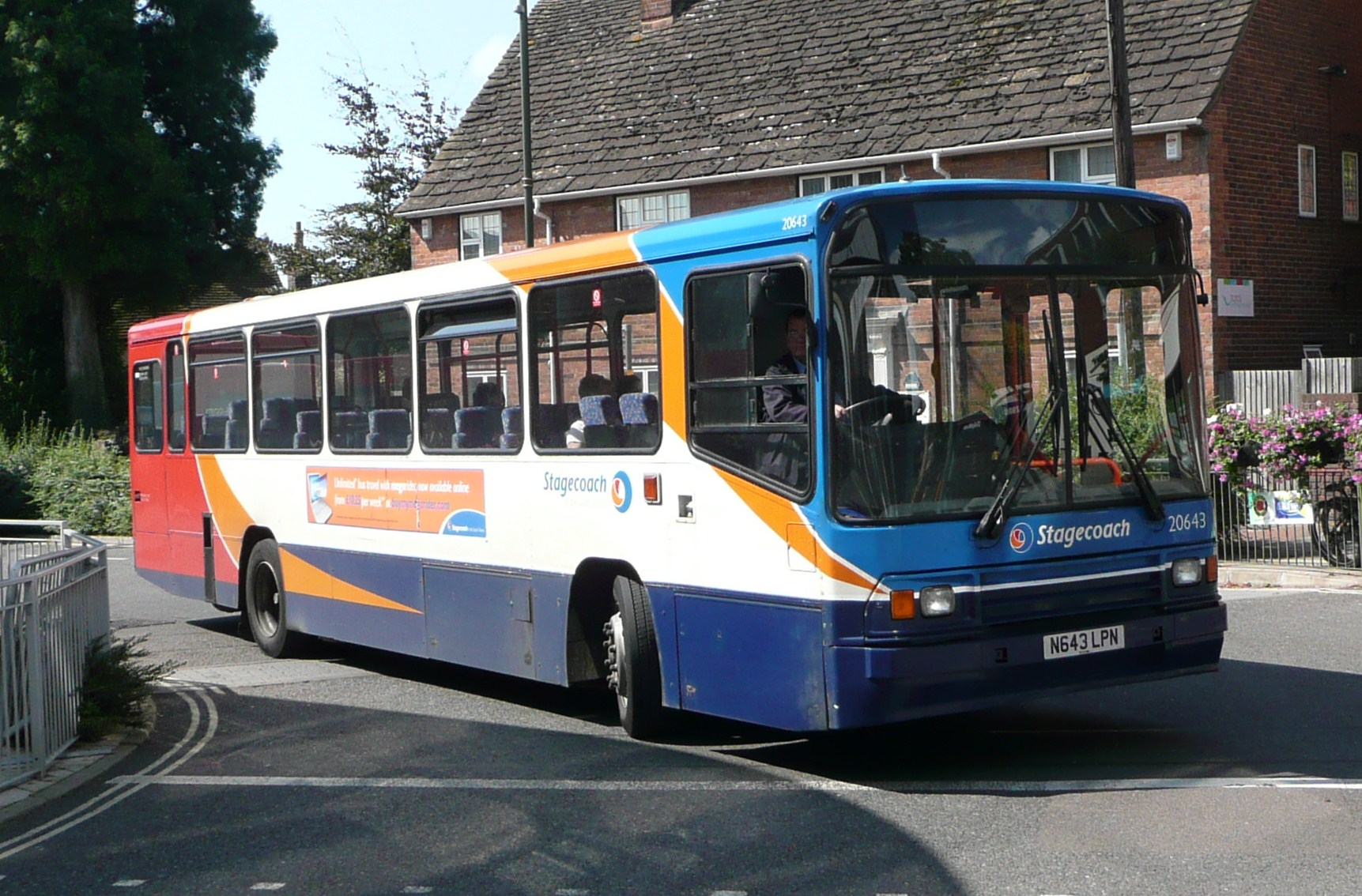
Stagecoach South Alexander PS bodied B10M in Horsham in September 2008

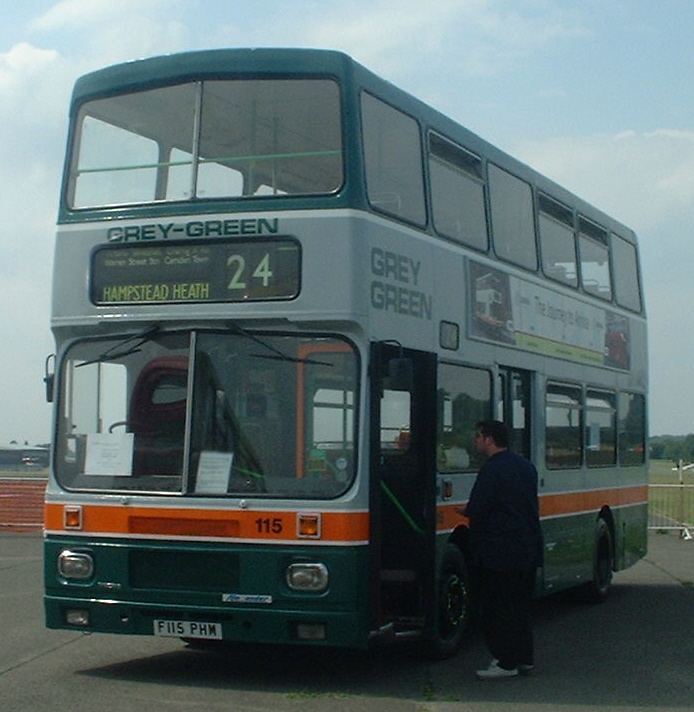
Preserved Grey-Green Alexander RV bodied Citybus in June 2003

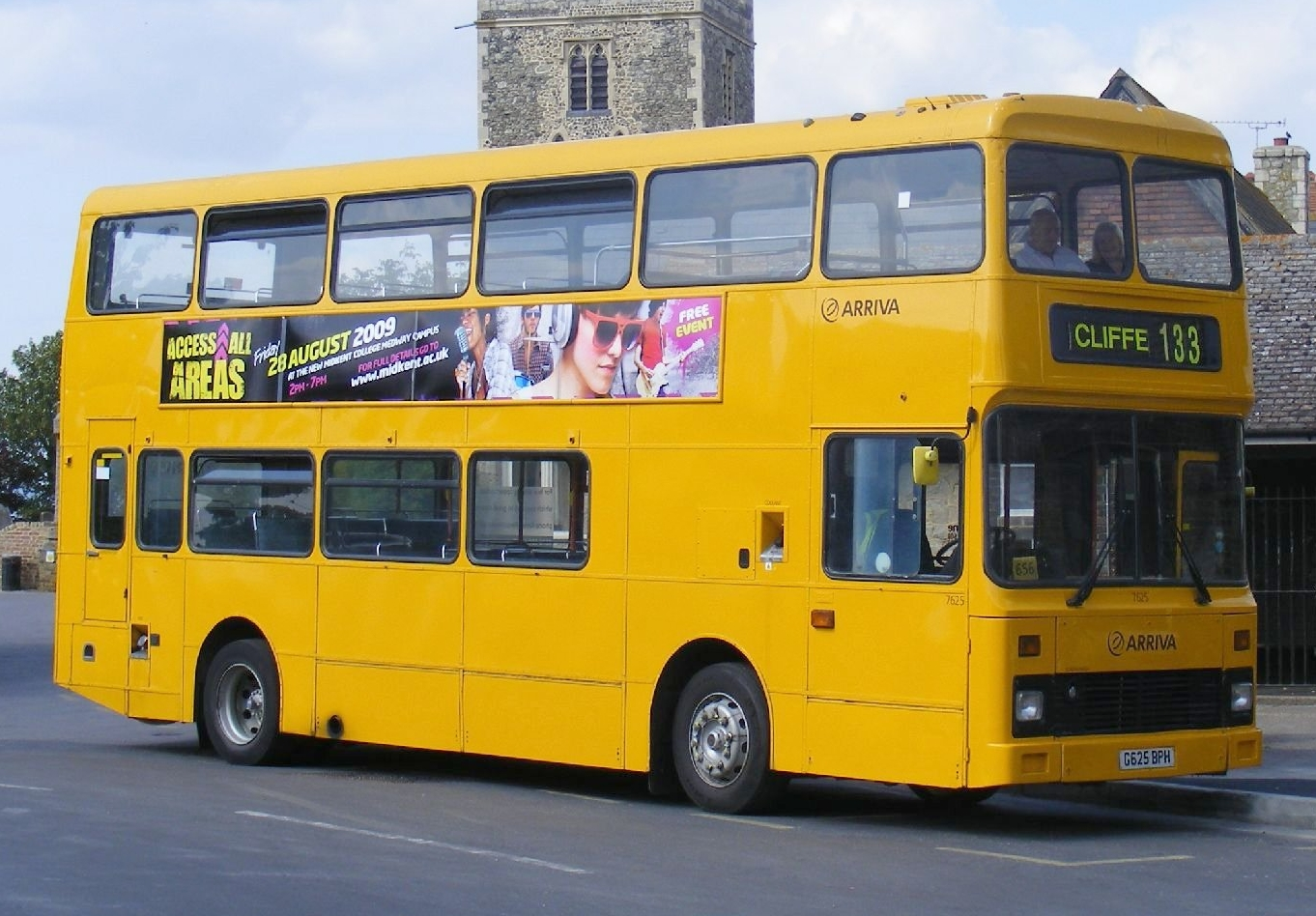
Arriva Medway Towns Northern Counties Palatine bodied Volvo Citybus in schoolbus livery in Cliffe in August 2009

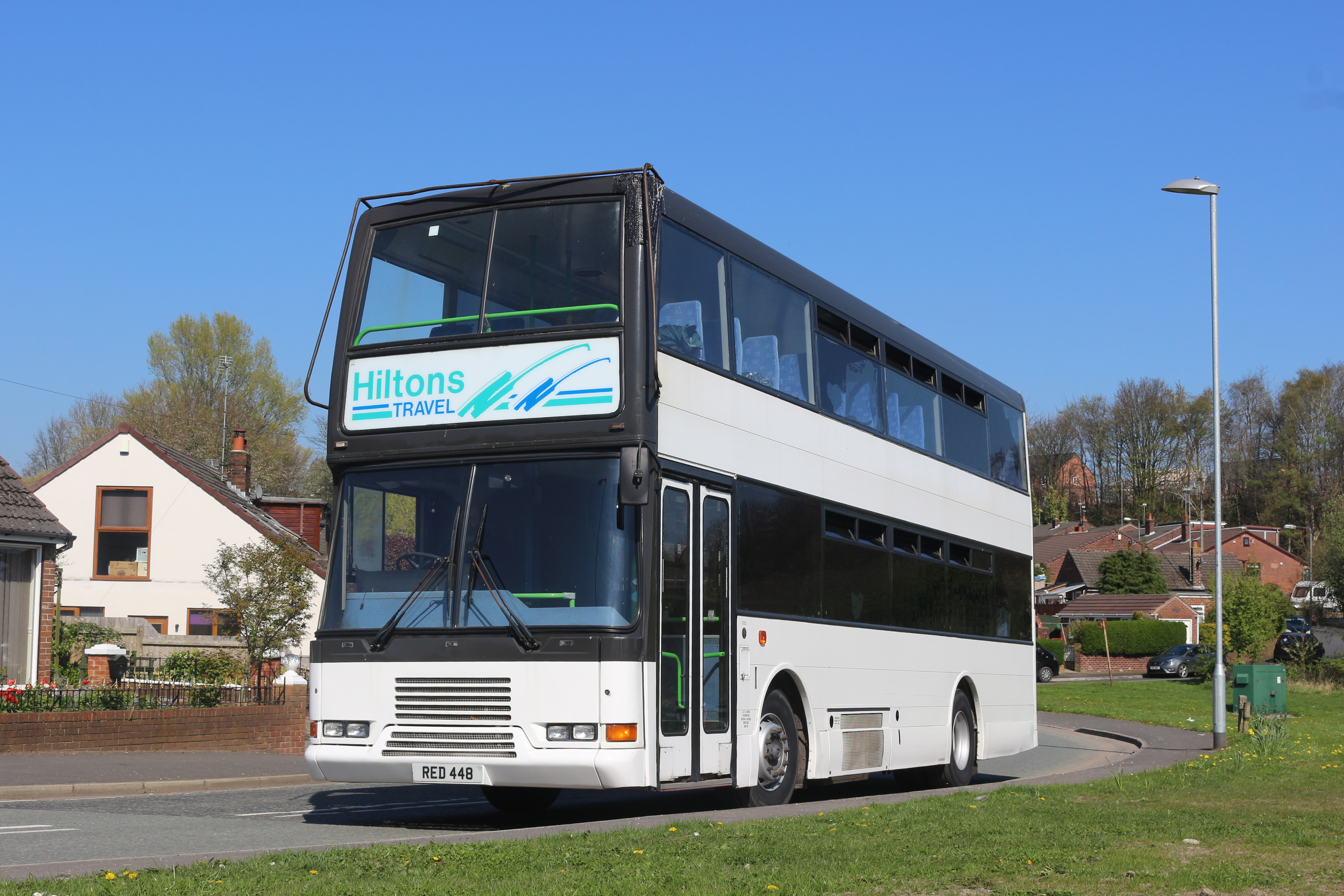
Hilton's Travel East Lancs bodied Citybus in Newton-le-Willows

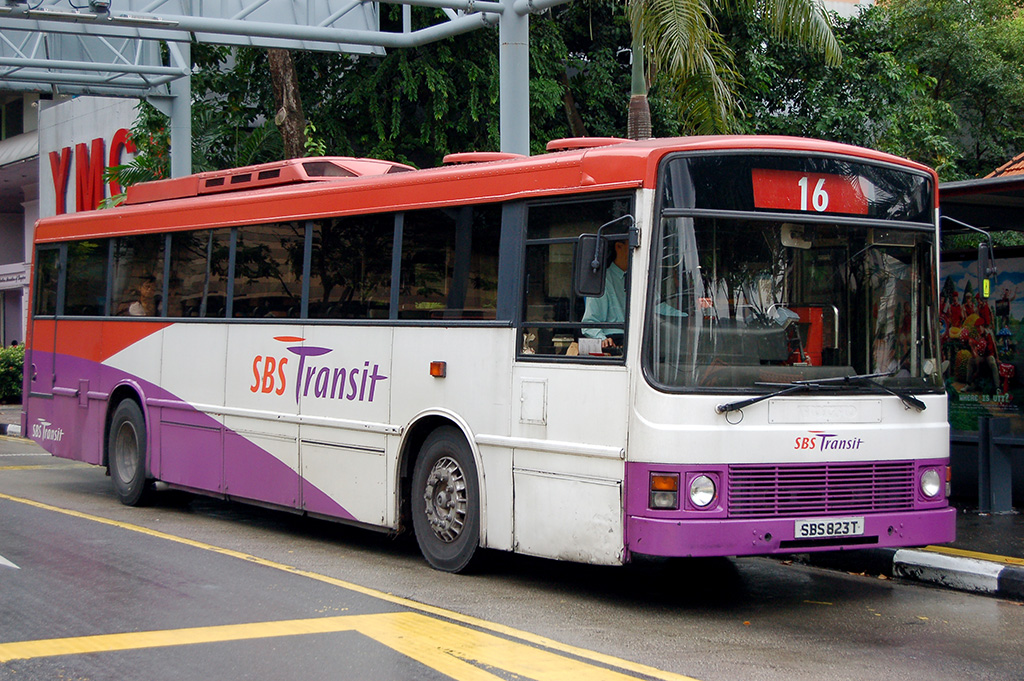
SBS Transit Duple Metsec bodied Volvo B10M in Singapore

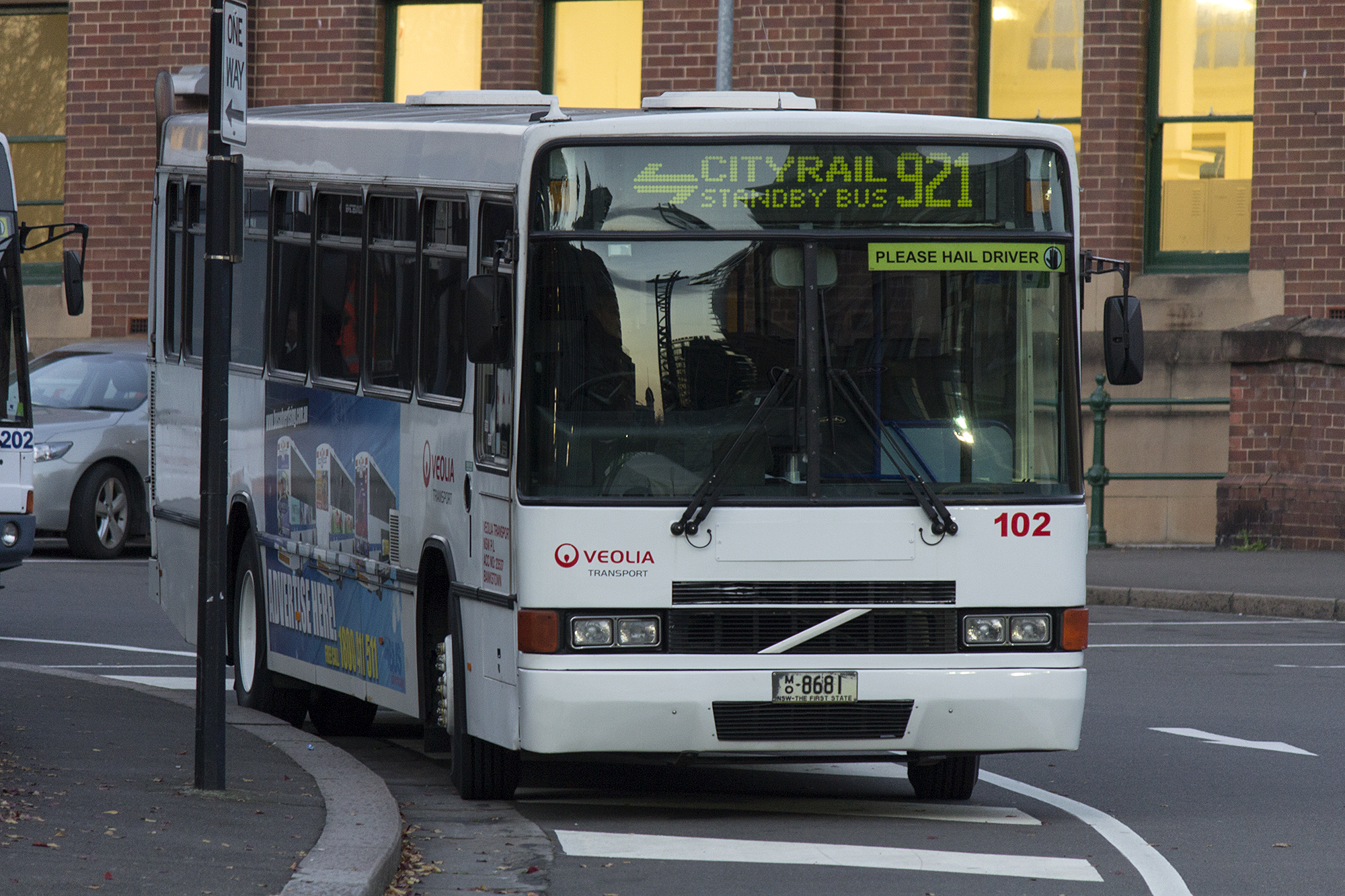
Veolia Transport Custom Coaches bodied B10M MkIII in Sydney in July 2013

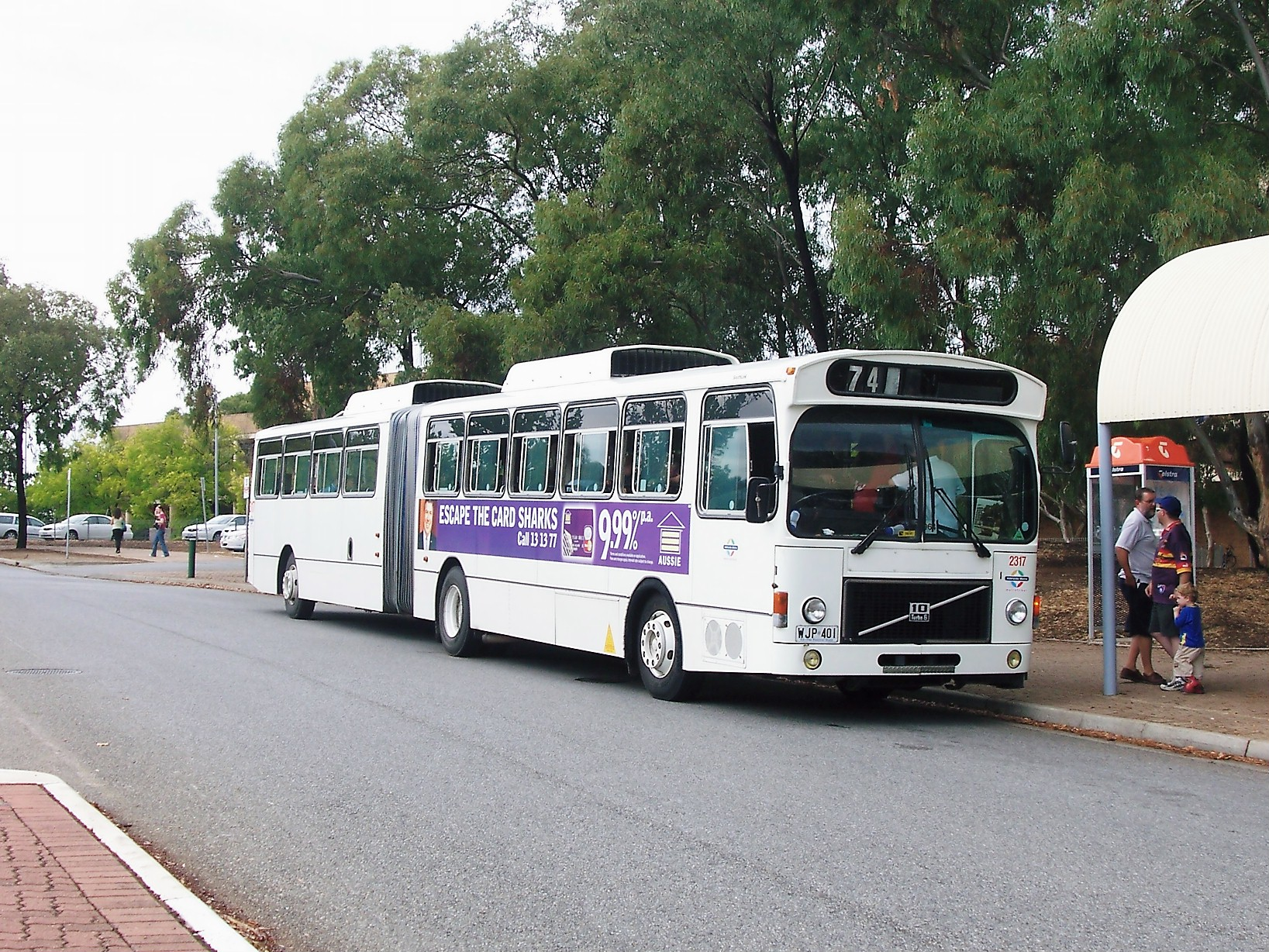
Pressed Metal Corporation South Australia bodied B10MA in Adelaide

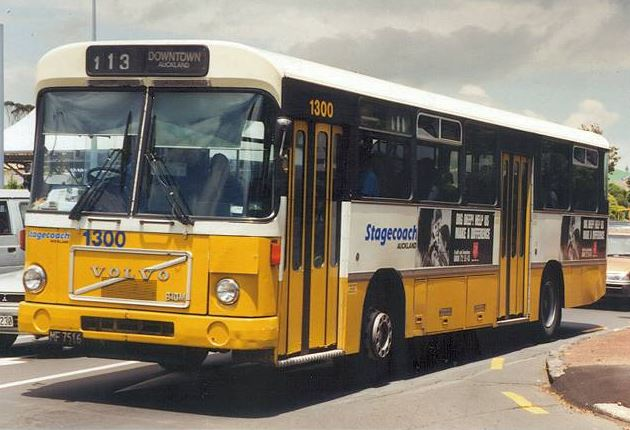
Stagecoach New Zealand Motor Bodies VöV bodied B10M

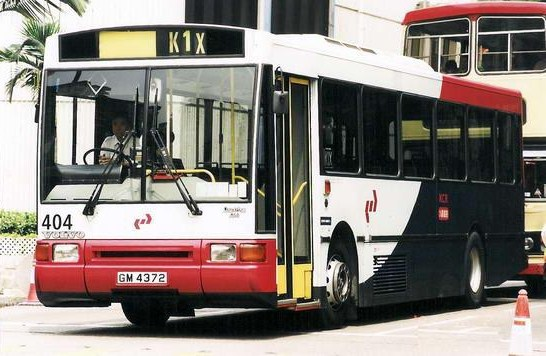
Kowloon-Canton Railway Corporation Northern Counties Countybus Paladin bodied Volvo B10M in Hong Kong

Designed as a successor to the Volvo B58, a large portion of B10M chassis were built in Sweden, but some were built in other countries, like the United Kingdom and Brazil.

The B10M was one of the best-selling chassis in the United Kingdom throughout the 1980s and 1990s. Having originally been produced only as a coach chassis, the B10M was made available as a city bus, in which form it was also very popular.

It was available as B10M-46, B10M-50, B10M-55, B10M-60, B10M-62, B10M-65 and B10M-70, where the number represents the wheelbase in decimetres. Many bodybuilders did however shorten or extend the chassis to fit their needs. No later than 1981 a tri-axle chassis was introduced, available as B10M-50B, B10M-55B, B10M-60B, B10M-65B and B10M-70B, with some bodybuilders extending them up to 7.25 metres wheelbase.

=== B10MD/D10M ===
A double-decker version of the B10M was developed in the United Kingdom for Strathclyde PTE in 1981. It was launched in early 1982 as a successor to the front-engined Volvo Ailsa B55, with a downrated engine from the B10M coach, and was named Citybus (also known unofficially as B10MD or D10M). The bus was 9,514 mm in length, possessed a six-cylinder, 9.6 litre THD100 engine, and was offered with either a Voith or ZF automatic gearbox. (Note: Although some early examples, such as the prototype developed for Strathclyde, had a Self-Changing Gears semi-automatic gearbox.) Most early examples were bodied by Walter Alexander Coachbuilders, who provided a modified version – common to all Volvo double-deck chassis bodied by the company after 1980 – of their popular and attractive R type bodywork, as used initially on the Ailsa (and characterised by a large black front grille). Eastern Scottish and Fife Scottish bought many of these early versions between 1985 and 1987. Two were exported in 1984, one of them to Singapore Bus Services (SBS) and the other to Kowloon Motor Bus (KMB). The KMB B10MD bus was destroyed by fire in 1988.

The Citybus lasted until the end of B10M production but fell out of favour after Volvo re-engineered the Leyland Olympian as the Volvo Olympian in 1993. 586 examples were built for 32 operators in the UK, with the last batch received by Nottingham City Transport in 1997. Alexander bodied the majority of them, supplying 336 to 23 operators between 1984 and 1993. The three biggest customers of the Citybus were Strathclyde PTE (which bought 101 Citybuses between 1984 and 1990), London & Country (74) and Nottingham City Transport (46).

=== B9M ===
The B9M was launched in 1982 as a light-weight, stripped-down, budget version of the standard B10M. It was available as B9M-46, B9M-50, B9M-55 and B9M-60. Although technically not a successor to the B57, it found more or less the same place in the markets where it was available. The B9M had the same 9.6-litre engine as the B10M, but at lower outputs. It sold well in the Nordic countries, with the exception of Denmark, where only a few were sold. The model was available at least past 1996.

In the United Kingdom, the B9M-46 was sold as a shorter 9.5 to 9.7 metre version of the B10M from 1985.

=== B10MT and B10T ===
From 1984, a RHD version of the B10M-55B was available as the B10MT, later also B10T.

=== C10M and B10M-C ===
In 1984, Swiss bodybuilder Ramseier & Jenzer collaborated with Volvo to unveil a semi-integral coach known as the C10M, with the engine in the middle of the chassis. Production of the C10M was ended in 1987, but the position of the engine was still available as an option and became known as B10M-C.

== United Kingdom ==
Coach operators National Express, Park's of Hamilton, Shearings and Wallace Arnold all purchased large quantities of B10Ms.

In the 1990s, Stagecoach standardised on the bus version of the B10M as their full-size single decker. Most received Alexander PS bodies but some received Northern Counties Paladin bodywork. Stagecoach also took numerous examples of the coach version with Plaxton's Interurban bodywork and Jonckheere's Modulo bodywork. South Yorkshire Transport and Kelvin Central Buses also purchased large numbers of the type with Alexander PS bodies.

The B10MA articulated variant was of limited popularity among bus operators in the United Kingdom. British Caledonian Airways took four in 1988, the next examples sold in Britain were supplied eight years later, with the delivery of four to Ulsterbus. Stagecoach was the biggest customer for the model in the UK, purchasing 18 in the mid- to late-1990s, with the last delivered in 1999.

== Singapore ==
Singapore Bus Services evaluated a mid-engine Volvo B10MD double-decker bus bodied by East Lancashire Coachbuilders in 1984. It was registered as SBS4961B and ran on route 111, serving Hougang Central Terminal and Ghim Moh Terminal. No further B10MD units were acquired however. A second B10M demonstrator was an air-conditioned single-deck bus bodied by Van Hool which was acquired and registered as SBS9C in 1986. It was also the only Volvo B10M Mark I acquired by Singapore Bus Services and it was sold to an operator in New Zealand by the end of the 1990s.

SBS purchased a grand total of 977 B10M Mark 2, 3 and 4 units between 1989 and 1998, making up a large part of its single-decker bus fleet. This was the third-largest fleet of any single bus model to ever exist in Singapore history.

The Volvo B10M Mark IIs were the first to be used, with all 200 delivered between March 1988 and April 1989. They were registered as SBS1696L to SBS1895D. The Volvo B10M Mark IIs were originally delivered as non-air-conditioned buses. Later, 110 units were converted to air-conditioned buses. The Mark IIs received bodywork by Duple Metsec and Walter Alexander PS. They were retired by May 2008; after fulfilling their 19-year lifespan, except one which was sold to New Zealand. The buses were originally supposed to be replaced by 200 Volvo B10BLE single deckers in 2005, because of the Euro IV regulations, it was reduced to 10 Volvo B10BLE single deckers whereas the remainder was replaced by Scania K230UB, the lifespan was extended due to the bus model change.

300 B10M Mark IIIs were delivered between November 1992 and June 1993. They were bodied by Duple Metsec, and had received mid-life refurbishment. Most units received a two-year lifespan extension due to insufficient replacement buses, and were all retired by June 2012.

Some of the units were registered with Malaysia's Agensi Pengangkutan Awam Darat (APAD) (Land Public Transport Agency) for use on cross-border routes 160, 170 (Red Plate, then known as 170) and 170 (Blue Plate, then known as 170X), as such:

Years	Model	Reason of retirement
1973 - 1983	Mercedes-Benz OF1413	
1983 - 1993	Volvo B57	APAD registration expired in 1993.
1993 - 2001	Volvo B10M Mark 2	APAD registration expired in 2004. The last non-aircon single-deck buses. These buses came from BBDEP.
2001 - 2011	Volvo B10M Mark 3	APAD registration expired in 2011. The first air-con single-deck buses. These buses came from BBDEP, BNDEP and HGDEP.
2011 - 2014	Volvo B10M Mark 4 (DM3500) and Volvo B10M Mark 4 (Walter Alexander Strider)	APAD registration expired in 2014. The last high floor buses. These buses came from BBDEP, BNDEP and HGDEP.
2014 - January 2022	Scania K230UB	APAD registration expired in 2022. the first low-floor buses. These buses came from BBDEP, HGDEP and SLBP.
January 2022 - Present	Mercedes-Benz O530 Citaro and MAN NL323F A22 (Gemilang)	APAD registration expires in 2032. Assumed to eventually be replaced by new electric buses.

475 B10M Mark IVs were delivered between June 1995 and December 2000. They were bodied by either Duple Metsec, PSV Soon Chow or Walter Alexander Strider. Most buses built in 1995 and 1996 were extended for two years due to insufficient replacement buses. Land Transport Authority (LTA) had barred lifespan extension for single-decker buses registered between 1997 and 1999. 29 DM3500-bodied buses had received another one-year extension in November 2017, due to insufficient replacement buses. All 29 buses have been retired as of 22 December 2018 after reaching an extended lifespan of 18 years.

The B10Ms were deployed on nearly every bus route operated by Singapore Bus Services and SBS Transit. During their lifespan, they were a very common sight on the roads. A few of the B10M buses were redeployed for services in the Jurong Industrial Area after the retirement of Mercedes-Benz O405 in May 2011 and stayed there throughout the lifespan.

A 14.50m B10M Mark IV "Superlong" tri-axle demonstrator bus, bodied by Duple Metsec and registered as SBS997A, was purchased in 1995 and retired in October 2012. It was most commonly deployed on route 83. The bus was de-registered and scrapped soon after. SBS997A was the only tri-axle single-deck bus to ever exist in Singapore.

A 19.0m B10MA articulated bus, also bodied by Duple Metsec, was purchased in 1996. It was registered SBS998Y and known as "Asia's Longest Bus". In 2006, it was sold to Bayes Coachline of New Zealand, together with Mercedes-Benz O405G 17.70m (Bendy Bus) (SBS999U).

If the most popular public bus nicknames of the Asia Longest Vehicle (articulated), Superlong Vehicle as the Mark IV Duple Metsec batch are very bearing close resemblance to regular 12-metre buses and Strider bodied by Walter Alexander (rigid). All Volvo B10M (rigid) buses are powered by the Volvo THD101G engine (9,600cc) or THD102KF engine (9,603cc) that are Euro I compliant paired with a Voith DIWA 851.2 or 4-speed automatic ZF Ecomat 4HP 500 gearboxes. Articulated bus (SBS998Y) were also powered by the Volvo THD102KB engine (9,603cc), with power output of 286hp (210kW) and they were fitted with a ZF Ecomat 4HP 590 4-speed gearbox. two demonstrator B10M Mk1 sets were fitted with a Volvo THD100EC engine (9,600cc).

== Japan ==
For Expo '85 in Tsukuba, Fuji Heavy Industries bodied 100 B10MLs. Seventy-nine were exported to Australia in 1986 with Brisbane Transport, Busways, Grenda's Bus Service, Hornibrook Bus Lines, Invicta Bus Service, Kangaroo Bus Lines, Metro-link Bus Lines, Metropolitan Transit Authority, Premier Roadliners, Sunbury Bus Service and Surfside Buslines purchasing examples.

== United States ==
From 1983 to 1986, a number of B10Ms were built and used in the United States. The American B10M was manufactured mostly in its articulated form (which was purchased by SEPTA, SamTrans, and New Jersey Transit) though a standard length B10M model was made for the RIPTA with one example going to SEPTA as compensation for delays. Canadian production of the B10MA articulated bus under licence to Ontario Bus Industries nearly took place, however it fell through when that company negotiated a more favorable deal with Ikarus Bus.

== Australia ==
In Australia, the B10M was purchased by government operators Adelaide Metro, Brisbane Transport and Metro Tasmania, as well as private operators, with large fleets built up in Sydney by Busways and Westbus, and in Melbourne by Grenda Corporation and Sita Buslines.

Three-axle B10Ms were fitted with high and double decker coach bodies with AAT Kings, Ansett Pioneer, Australian Pacific Tours, Greyhound and Westbus among the buyers.

== New Zealand ==
In New Zealand, two Volvo B10Ms with VöV bodies built by Coachwork International were ordered by Auckland Regional Council in 1985. These are the only Volvo buses to receive the VoV body.

In 1996, five ex-Hong Kong Stagecoach Volvo B10Ms were sold to New Zealand from Hong Kong because of disposal in Hong Kong residential bus services.

== Belgium ==
At least 168 B10M and B10MA buses were purchased by Belgian operators (SNCV / NMVB, TEC and De Lijn). They were fitted with carbodies built by Belgian manufacturers : Van Hool (A120, Linea), Jonckheere (TransCity, 056, Transit, Communo, Transit 2000) and a few had a Dutch Hainje/Berkhof ST2000, Berhof 2000NL or a Berkhof Excellence 500 body.

In Belgium, most of the buses on B10BMA chassis were owned by public operators while the B10B buses belonged to private leasers, working on contract with these operators.

While most of these buses are now withdrawn in Belgium, De Lijn still owns some articulated Jonckheere Transit 2000 G.

== Greece ==
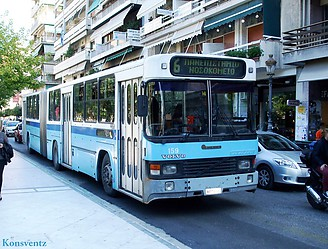
An articulated B10M in Patras, Greece

The articulated version of the B10M constructed by Saracakis under the name "Alexandros" in 1993, 1995 and 1997. All the buses were ordered by Thessaloniki Urban Transport Organization in Thessaloniki, Greece.

- 1993 version was featured with steering in the rear axle.
- The 1995 and 1997 are facelift versions and the chassis on the rear part was changed.

In Thessaloniki, none of these buses operate today as they were all scrapped. Some buses were sold to the Patras Urban Bus Company (Astiko Ktel Patron) and were used until approximately 2018.

== Hong Kong ==
In Hong Kong, three bus companies purchased Volvo B10Ms.

Citybus (CTB) ordered 10 Volvo B10Ms with Van Hool bodied and THD101GD engine fitted between 1990 and 1992 for their border-crossing service between Hong Kong and Mainland China. In 1997, CTB ordered two more Volvo B10Ms with China Volvo bus bodied and DH10A engine fitted into its border fleet. After the closure of border-crossing service, those B10Ms has been sold to private tourist bus companies in Hong Kong.

Kowloon-Canton Railway Corporation ordered 15 Volvo B10Ms in 1995 for replacing second-handed MCW Metrobus fleet, with Northern Counties bodied, ZF4HP500 gearbox and Volvo THD102KF engine fitted. These buses also fitted with Lazzerini chairs inside the interior. All ex-KCRC B10Ms has sold to the MTR Corporation because of the merge of mass railways service in Hong Kong in late 2007.

In 1994, Stagecoach Hong Kong ordered five B10Ms with Alexander PS bodied and THD101GC engine fitted, these B10Ms were serviced at private house estates residential services in Hong Kong operated by Stagecoach company. But in 1996, Stagecoach company Hong Kong closed, these Volvo B10Ms were sold to New Zealand.

== Replacement ==
The B10M as a single-deck bus was complemented (and was largely replaced) by the low-floor rear-engined B10L and B10BLE chassis in some markets in the late 1990s. In 2001 the B10M was replaced by the B12M, sporting a larger 12.1-litre engine and the engine position of the C10M/B10M-C.
