= Volvo B12M =

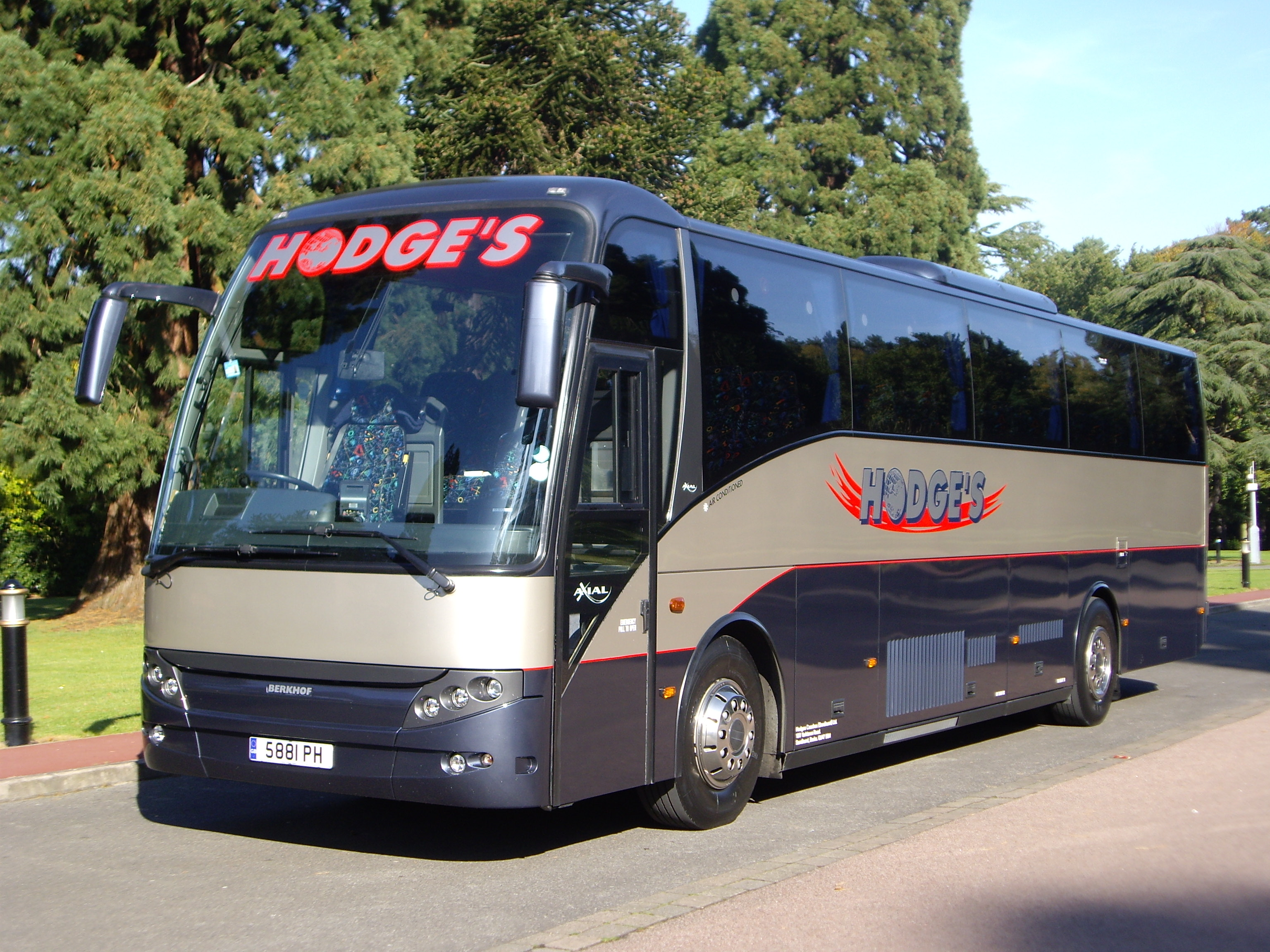
- A Volvo B12M with Berkhof Axial coach bodywork in the Hodge's Coaches fleet

Overview
- Manufacturer: Volvo Buses
- Production: 2002-2022
- Assembly: Borås, Sweden, and other locations (including Curitiba, Brazil, where it was last produced)

Body and chassis
- Doors: 1-4
- Floor type: High

Powertrain
- Engine: Volvo DH12 12-litre Diesel
- Power output: 310-460BHP
- Transmission: ZF 5/6HP602C; Manual; Voith automatic

Chronology
- Predecessor: Volvo B10M

The Volvo B12M is an underfloor mid-engined bus/coach chassis introduced by Volvo Buses in 2002 as a replacement for the Volvo B10M. It is available with a variety of bodies such as the Van Hool T9 Alizee, Sunsundegui Sideral and Plaxton Panther/Paragon. Large British users of the B12M include Wallace Arnold, Park's Motor Group and Southern Vectis.

In Brazil, the B12M replaced the B10M in articulated/bi-articulated versions, not being built in a solo bus version like its predecessors B58E and B10M, and is produced since 2004. Also, in Curitiba, there are bi-articulated buses on Volvo B12M chassis in a 28-meter configuration, making them some of the world's longest buses. Since 2011, the B12M was renamed as B340M, and the chassis was updated to the Proconve P7/Euro V emission standard rules in the following year. Both articulated and bi-articulated versions are rated for 340 hp. After Euro VI-based Proconve P8 emission standard became mandatory in Brazil in 2023, the B340M chassis was discontinued with no diesel successor being developed; instead, Volvo developed an electric bi-articulated bus chassis which belongs to the BZR range; a single-articulated variant is presumably also in development.

== See also ==
- List of buses
