= History of bus transport in Hong Kong =

The history of bus transport in Hong Kong began with the introduction of the first bus routes in Hong Kong in the 1920s. Bus services were officially franchised in 1933, with government-granted monopolies to Kowloon Motor Bus (KMB) and China Motor Bus (CMB). After the Japanese occupation of Hong Kong, the British led a post-war expansion of bus transport into the 1960s. The 1967 Hong Kong riots halted bus services and led to the public light bus.

In the 1970s, CMB and KMB expanded with the Daimler Fleetline and the Leyland Victory Mark 2, later introducing the three-axler with models such as the Dennis Dragon and the Mercedes-Benz O305 in the early 1980s, followed by the Leyland Olympian and the Dennis Falcon in the late 1980s. In the 1990s, the rise of Citybus (CTB) led to the demise of CMB, and several models were withdrawn in the 2000s.

Two-axle air-conditioned double-decker buses were introduced in the 2010s, while non-low-floor and non-air-conditioned buses went extinct. Over the decades, operations evolved from single-deck buses and bus conductors to double-deckers. As of July 2026, after the 2023 merge of New World First Bus and Citybus, the four major franchised companies operating bus transport are Citybus, Kowloon Motor Bus, Long Win Bus (LWB), and New Lantao Bus (NLB).

== 1920s: The beginning ==
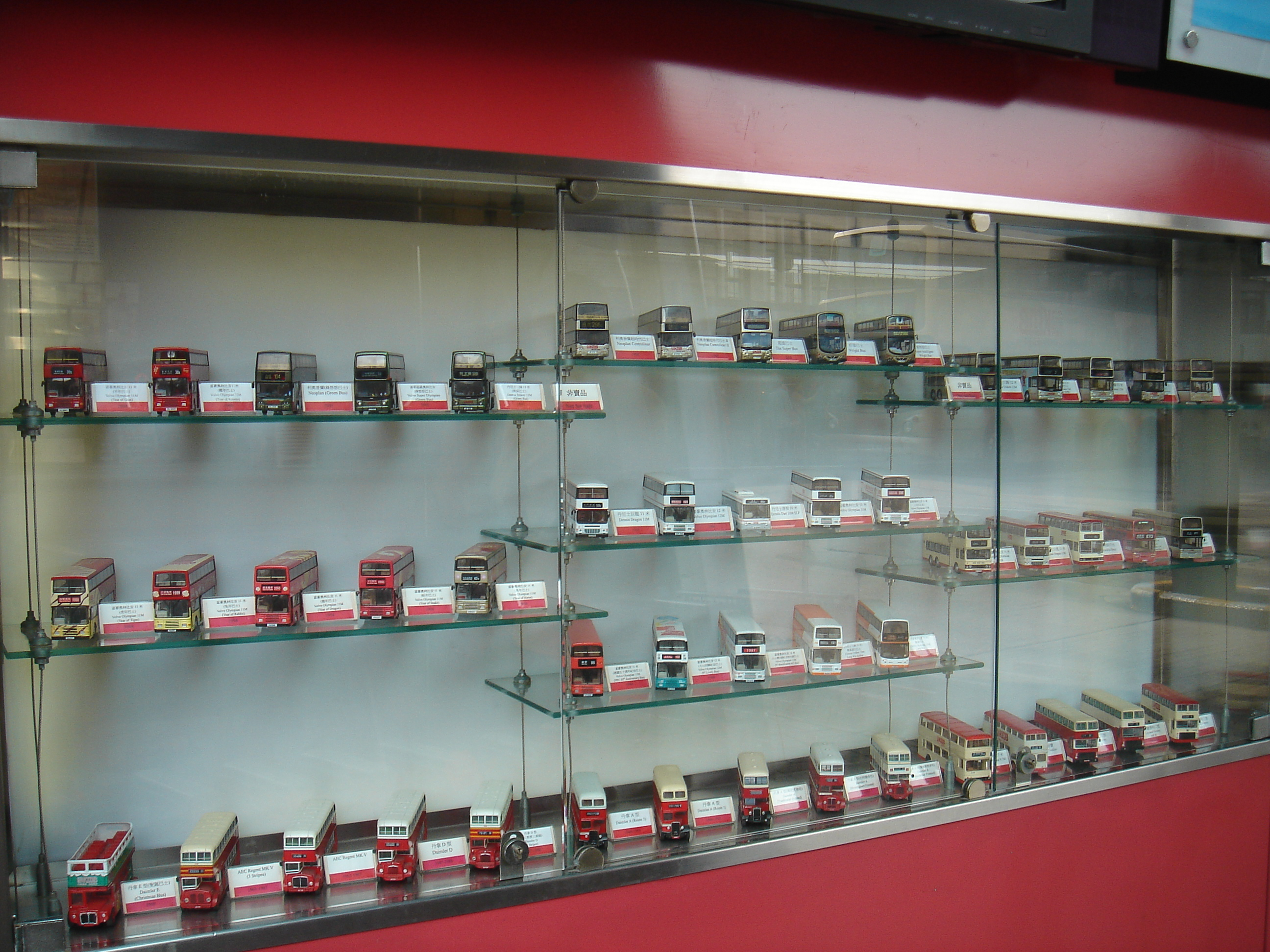
Collection of Kowloon Motor Bus bus models, from past to present.

Bus transport in Hong Kong was started in the 1920s. Several operators were managing a number of bus routes on both sides of the Victoria Harbour by the end of the 1920s. These included:

- Kowloon Motor Bus
- China Motor Bus
- Hong Kong Tramways
- Hong Kong and Shanghai Hotels
- Aberdeen Kai Fong Hotel
- Hong Kong Hotels

== 1930s: Pre-war franchise ==
In 1933, bus services were franchised. Rights were given to Kowloon Motor Bus (KMB) on the North side, and China Motor Bus (CMB) on the Island. Other bus companies such as Hong Kong Tramways, Hong Kong & Shanghai Hotels, Hong Kong Hotel and Aberdeen Kai Fong, had to cease operations and their buses sold to the franchised operators.

Records relating to the period before the 1930s are scarce as they were mostly destroyed in World War II, but the surviving photographic and written evidence indicates that an extensive network of buses served both sides of the harbour. Some remote areas of the territory at the time, such as Yuen Long, Fanling and Stanley were also served. Buses of various British bus manufacturers, such as Leyland, Thornycroft and Daimler were present in significant numbers around the territory.

== Early 1940s: Japanese occupation ==
During the occupation, the Japanese tried to restore bus services to normal levels, but were unsuccessful due to an insufficient supply of fuel and spare parts. The limited resources and buses available for service was also responsible for the reduction in the total number of routes in service, as well as for the re-introduction of horse-driven carts to the territory.

== Late 1940s–1950s: Post-war expansion ==
When the British returned, they put the restoration of public transport to the highest priority. Before new buses were shipped to Hong Kong, both KMB and CMB had to use modified trucks instead of proper buses to transport passengers. These trucks were phased out by the end of the 1950s. The position eased when KMB took delivery of a batch of 50 single-deck Tilling-Stevens and CMB a further 108 during 1947/48.

The return of large number of people to Hong Kong after the war, and people who wanted to escape from the communists, caused a population boom. As a result, the demand for public transport skyrocketed and larger buses became necessary. Kowloon Motor Bus received 20 Daimler CVG5 double-decker buses in 1949 as a trial (one of the first 4 buses introduced had been preserved by KMB after withdrawal in the early 1980s). They turned out to be an unparalleled success, just like the AEC Regents (RT) in London. More than 1,000 buses in various specifications, including the Daimler Fleetlines, were to follow until the 1970s.

China Motor Bus chose to use more single-deck buses instead. This was because the Gardner engined double-deckers did not perform satisfactorily given the hilly terrain, and population levels on the island were more steady and predictable. The company partnered with Guy in Wolverhampton, England and became the second major buyer of Guy Arab buses – after Wolverhampton Corporation Transport.

== 1960s: Further expansion ==
A comparison the buses on both sides of the harbour in the 1960s: The KMB buses were larger in capacity with standard engines, while those of CMB were small yet over-powered. While KMB went for 34-foot double-decker buses, CMB chose to buy 36-foot version of Guy Arab, but with only 60% of the capacity of a 34-footer.

The growth of Hong Kong seemed to be out of control and squatter settlements sprang up everywhere. Areas like Wong Tai Sin, Kwun Tong and Chai Wan were developed at a rate that were unparalleled in any other British colony. The bus network had to grow accordingly. KMB started to call for double-deckers longer than 30 feet (after the British lack of regulations); to their dismay, Daimler did not respond and KMB had to buy a number of 34-footers from AEC to provide a decent level of service. Daimler finally regained ground by introducing the 34-foot CVG6 with the Gardner 6LX engine. This model found favour with KMB, which bought about 220 of them. Soon, these behemoths – for their time – were dominating the Kowloon streets, and replaced older Daimlers in outer areas, as well as the Cross-Harbour Tunnel routes later.

Meanwhile, CMB was tackling an equally big problem. On routes 8 and 8A (later to become route 82), buses have to travel up a hill, which includes covering a 1-km road with a gradient of 1:10. However, the small Tilling-Stevens and the Arabs which the CMB deployed were not up to the challenge due to the large population of Chai Wan, and the large double-deckers used by CMB did not have the required engine power. Finally CMB ordered 40 36-foot single-deck buses to shift the working crowds, after considering their early success in Africa. Those single-deckers, however, suffered from the same problem as their African siblings: They were too long, with a 10-foot overhang, 22-foot wheelbase and no upper deck to provide additional strength. The buses literally bent and their tail ends swung up and down. They were used for no longer than 10 years before being cut down to standard 30-foot length and re-bodied.

In 1963, China Motor Bus introduced the first double-decker bus (a Dennis Loline III) on Hong Kong Island, later CMB introduced more double-deckers (Guy Arabs) on routes serving the northern coast of the island.

At that time, even with larger buses and increased ridership, costs were still high. On KMB buses, there were up to four people employed on each bus – a driver, one or two conductors to collect the fares and the last, the gateman, supervised boarding and alighting by opening and closing the gates at each end. CMB buses had two crew on each bus, with the fare collector and the door-keeper being the same person. This level of manning was soon deemed unacceptable and the bus companies replaced manual doors and gates or open platforms with pneumatic doors, which eliminated the need for the gateman. However, there were no layoffs, as both bus companies were expanding and the surplus staff were soon retrained and deployed on new routes.

=== 1967 riots and the public light bus ===
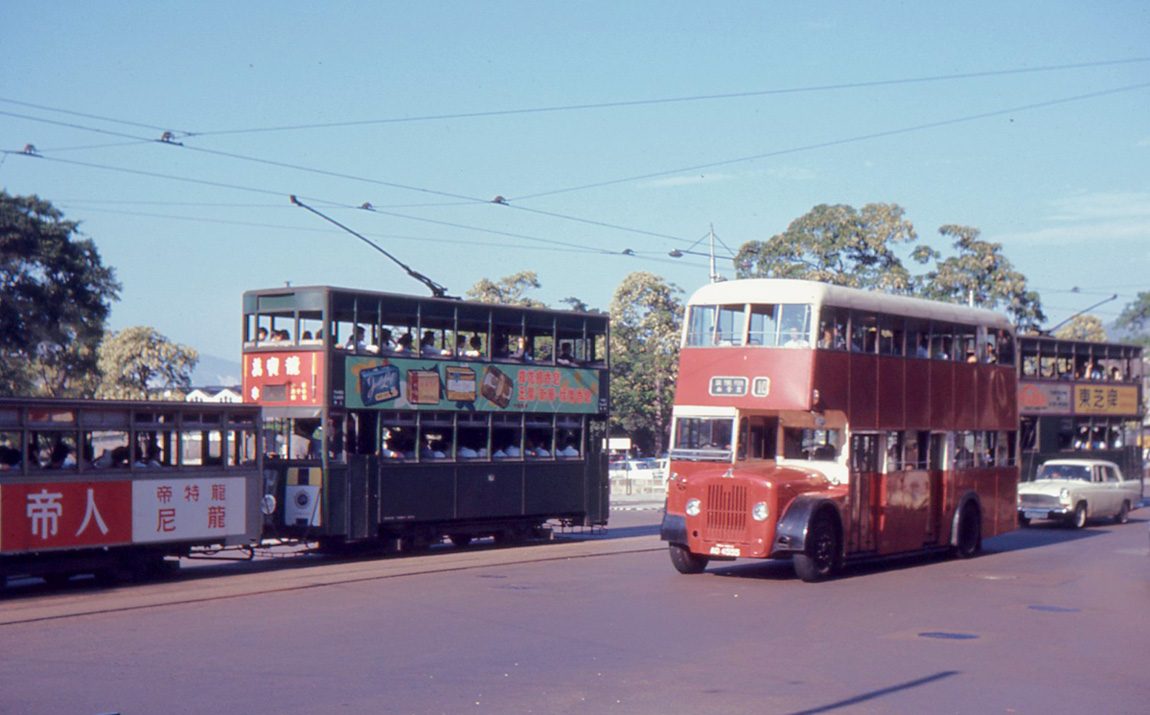
Public bus and double decker trams in 1967.

The outbreak of 1967 riots halted the bus services because of the intimidation of the front-line operational staff in the latter part of 1967. Services slowly returned to previous levels in early 1968, but this interruption had given the opportunity for dual-purpose vans to flourish and provide illegal – but at that time, necessary – public passenger services, which were then later to be legalised by a weak Transport Department and become the public light bus.

In 1968, two new towns, Kwun Tong and Tsuen Wan, started flourishing and KMB extended its service by opening a new route 40 to and from these.

== Early 1970s ==
As the demand of bus service was increasing and production of front-engine buses in UK was terminated, CMB and KMB acquired a number of second-hand buses such as Leyland Titans and Leyland Atlanteans from UK in the early 1970s.

In 1970, CMB started fitting more powerful engines to its Guy Arab double-deckers, giving them enough power for climbing up slopes and servicing areas such as the Mid-levels. In the same year, CMB also decided to convert its Guy Arab MkV single-deckers to double-deckers after one caught fire in 1968. Some of the short-wheelbase buses were rebodied with low-height double-deck bodies, enabling them to provide service on the Victoria Peak.

In 1971, CMB carried out tests of one-man-operated (OMO) bus with the post of the conductor eliminated. Passengers paid their fare by putting coins into a collection box. The tests were considered successful and so CMB converted all their buses to OMO by 1976. KMB had also likewise started to operate OMO buses since 1972.

In February 1972, CMB received one Daimler Fleetline rear-engine double-decker for evaluation, and subsequently started to introduce more Fleetlines in 1973. KMB also introduced their first Fleetline in 1974.

In August 1972, Cross-Harbour Tunnel connected Kowloon and Hong Kong Island. KMB and CMB jointly operated 3 new routes servicing both sides of the Victoria Harbour. The three routes are:

- 101: Kwun Tong (Yue Man Square) – Kennedy Town,
- 102: Lai Chi Kok – Shau Kei Wan, and
- 103: Wang Tau Hom – Pokfield Road

On 1 April 1974, New Lantao Bus Co.,(1973) Ltd. became the third franchised bus company in Hong Kong.

== Late 1970s: The Fleetline and the Victory ==
In the 1970s, CMB and KMB purchased almost 800 Fleetlines. With the new 3+2 seating arrangement in both decks, these Fleetlines could carry more than 120 passengers. Due to the high capacity, the Fleetlines were usually allocated to highly demanded cross-harbour routes.

However, the Fleetlines in Hong Kong were unreliable and poor in climbing slopes, so CMB and KMB had to find the alternatives. CMB evaluated the Ashok Leyland Titan, Scania Metropolitan and Volvo Ailsa B55, but these models were not successful. KMB evaluated the Guy Victory J modified by Bus Bodies (South Africa) Limited and Dennis Jubilant. Later British Leyland reacted by producing the Leyland Victory Mark 2, which was modified from the Victory J chassis and, like the Dennis Jubilant, had high-powered engine and automatic transmission. KMB and CMB purchased large number of Dennis Jubilant and Leyland Victory Mark 2 buses in late-1970s/early-1980s.

In 1975, KMB introduced its coach services, with the aim to attract more wealthy people to travel by coaches instead of driving; the company also introduced two airport coach routes in the same year. 1975 also saw the first overnight routes to be introduced – cross-harbour routes 121 and 122 (now known as routes N121 and N122 respectively), bus-bus interchange was also introduced for the two routes at the toll-plaza of Cross-Harbour Tunnel, the first of such practice in Hong Kong.

CMB introduced two suburban coach routes in 1978, using the first model of second generation rear-engined double-decker (MCW Metrobus) in Hong Kong.

== Early 1980s: Three-axle Dragons and Two-axle Mercedes ==
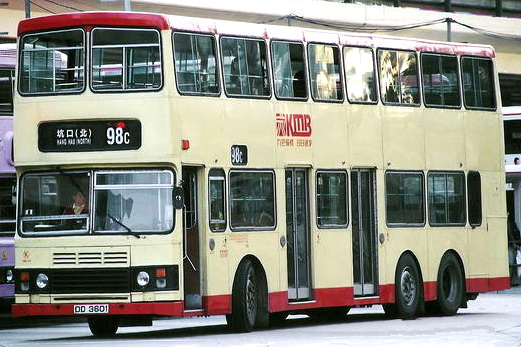
3-door Leyland Olympian, with one entrance and two exits.

In the early 1980s, CMB and KMB acquired a number of second-hand buses from UK, but this time all of them were ex-London Transport Daimler/Leyland Fleetlines.

In 1980, KMB started to evaluate air-conditioned double-deckers, but the trial was unsuccessful and the air-conditioners of the two buses (one Dennis Jubilant and one Leyland Victory Mark 2) were removed in 1983.

In 1981, CMB and KMB introduced the first 12-metre 3-axle double-deckers (MCW Metrobus). Another three 12-metre 3-axle double-decker bus models were introduced in late 1981/early 1982, namely Volvo Ailsa B55, Dennis Dragon/Condor and Leyland Olympian, all except the Volvo Ailsa are second generation rear-engined double-deckers.

In 1982, KMB finished the conversion of all of its buses to one-man operation.

Following the end of restriction of buying new buses from countries of Commonwealth of Nations, KMB introduced one German-built Mercedes-Benz O305 double-decker in 1983. It was followed by another 40 in 1985.

== Late 1980s: The Olympian and the Falcon ==
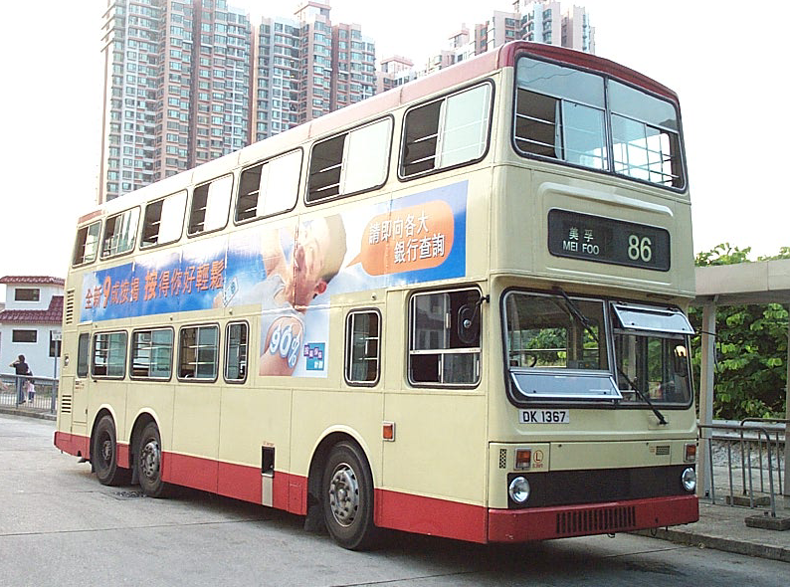
Kowloon Motor Bus MCW Metrobus at Sha Tin.

In 1985, KMB upgraded its airport coach service by introducing air-conditioned Dennis Falcon, which had the air conditioner driven by the main engine. The service was later named the "Airbus" service.

In 1986, KMB introduced the first 11-metre 3-axle double-deckers. These buses were designed with better manoeuvrability than 12-metre buses, with the feature of high capacity retained.

KMB resumed the evaluation of air-conditioned double-decker in the late 1980s, unlike those evaluated in the early 1980s, all these buses evaluated had the air-conditioning directly driven by the main engine. In 1987, the trial of one air-conditioned MCW Metrobus was started, but it was unsuccessful and the bus had its air-conditioning removed. Later Leyland Bus delivered one air-conditioned Olympian to KMB and the bus entered service in 1988, it was successful and later KMB started to place orders of air-conditioned Olympians (the prototype Olympian was finally withdrawn in 2005 and was preserved). An air-conditioned Dennis Dragon, which was also successful, was evaluated by KMB in 1990.

== 1990s: Evolution and the demise of CMB ==
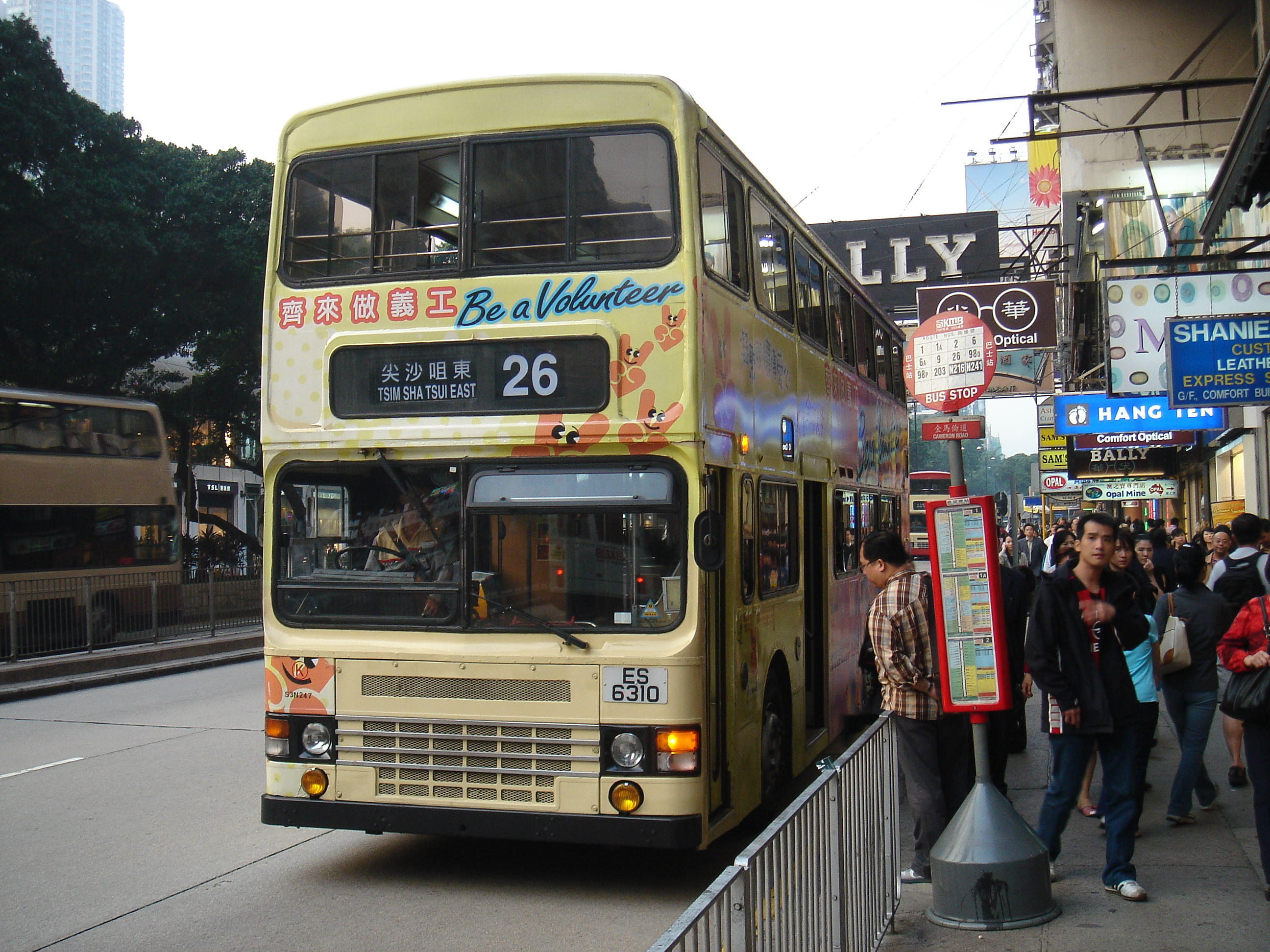
Kowloon Motor Bus Dennis Dragon, was retired by 2012.

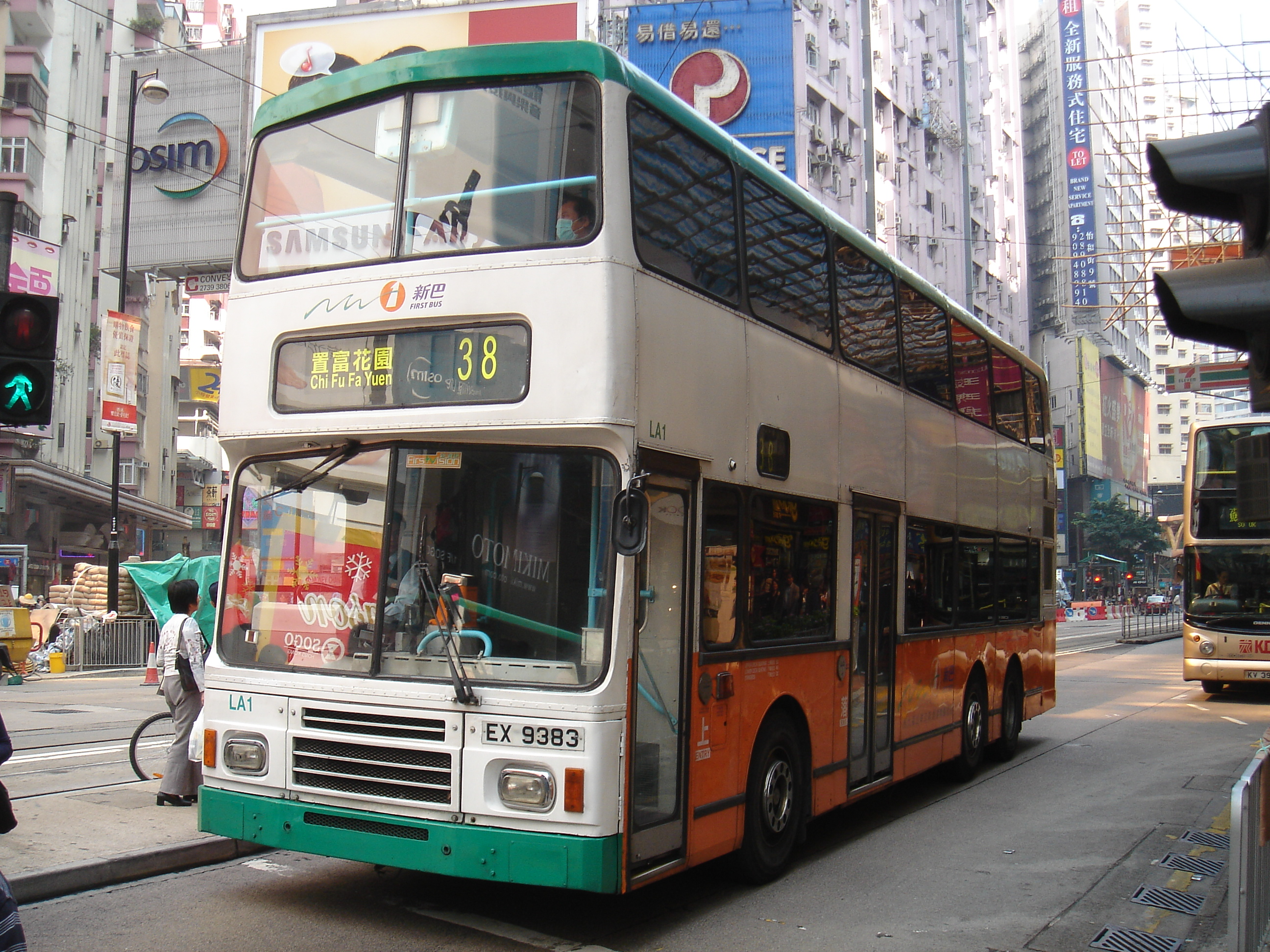
New World First Bus Leyland Olympian (LA1), acquired from China Motor Bus

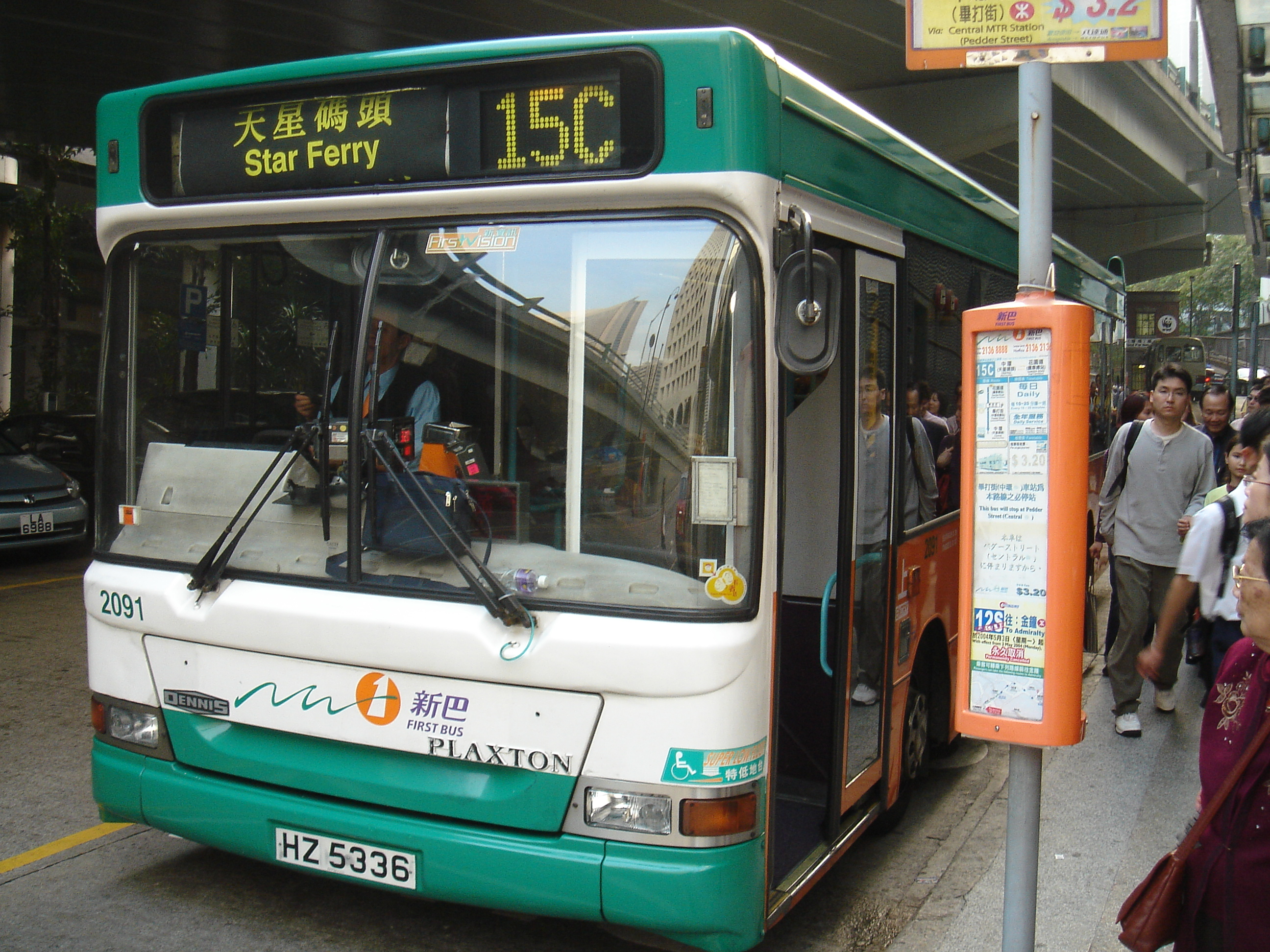
New World First Bus Plaxton Pointer bodied Dennis Dart

In September 1991, Citybus started to operate one franchised route on Hong Kong Island, becoming the fourth franchised bus company in Hong Kong.

In January 1992, New Lantao Bus was acquired by Kwoon Chung Motors.

China Motor Bus's service was being protested by the passengers since the 1980s, and was being criticised by the councillors of Legislative Council, finally CMB was forced to hand 28 routes to Citybus in 1993, and another 14 routes in 1995. In 1997 Citybus introduced several routes to replace some routes discontinued by CMB.

In 1995, KMB introduced its last non-air-conditioned buses. Since then, all the buses introduced by the franchised bus companies were air-conditioned.

In 1996, super low floor single-deckers were introduced in Hong Kong, Citybus introduced ten Volvo B6LE, then KMB followed by introducing 12 Dennis Dart SLF buses. Later in 1997, the first super low floor double-deckers (Dennis Trident, the KMB of prototype Trident was finally withdrawn in 2015 and was preserved) were also introduced by KMB and Citybus; in the following two years, different models of super low floor buses were being introduced.

In May 1997, with the Tsing Ma Bridge coming into operation and commencement of settlement in the Tung Chung new town, Citybus and Long Win Bus (subsidiary of KMB) started to operate new franchised routes serving Tung Chung. Both of them, together with New Lantao Bus, started to operate the new airport bus services when the new Hong Kong International Airport came into operation on 6 July 1998.

In March 1998, Citybus became the first franchised bus company to operate fully air-conditioned bus fleet. In its non-franchised bus division, open-top buses do continue to have non-aircon bus fleet until 2006, where air-conditioned Leyland Olympians took over. Citybus retired all non-aircon bus fleet by February 2014.

After China Motor Bus handed 42 routes to Citybus, the public and the government were still not satisfied, however. Finally, CMB's bus franchise was terminated on 31 August 1998, and its routes went to New World First Bus (NWFB), Citybus and KMB on 1 September 1998.

In March 1999, Citybus was acquired by the Stagecoach Group.

The 1990s also saw the withdrawal of Daimler/Leyland Fleetline and Leyland Victory Mark 2 buses. CMB and KMB started to withdraw their Fleetlines in the late 1980s and the last KMB Fleetline was withdrawn in 1995. All the KMB's Victories were also withdrawn in the 1990s. After New World First Bus acquired the whole CMB fleet, it also replaced the Victories and the remaining Fleetlines with new super low floor buses, the last Fleetlines and Victories were withdrawn in August 2000.

Bus-bus interchange became a common practice since the 1990s. In 1991 bus-bus interchange was introduced for Shing Mun Tunnel routes. Later on bus-bus interchange using transfer tickets was introduced on some overnight routes and Tai Lam Tunnel routes. With the Octopus card being accepted on some franchised bus routes since 1997, the first bus-bus interchange using Octopus card was first introduced in 1999.

== 2000s: Innovation and model withdrawals ==
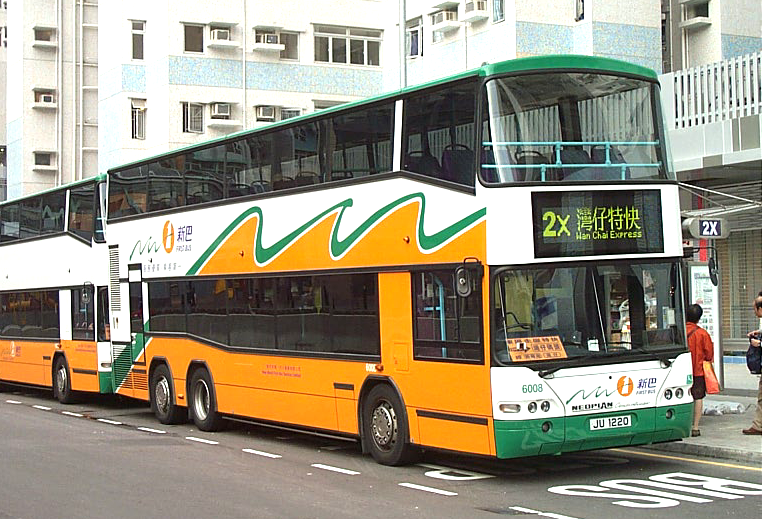
New World First Bus Neoplan Centroliner.

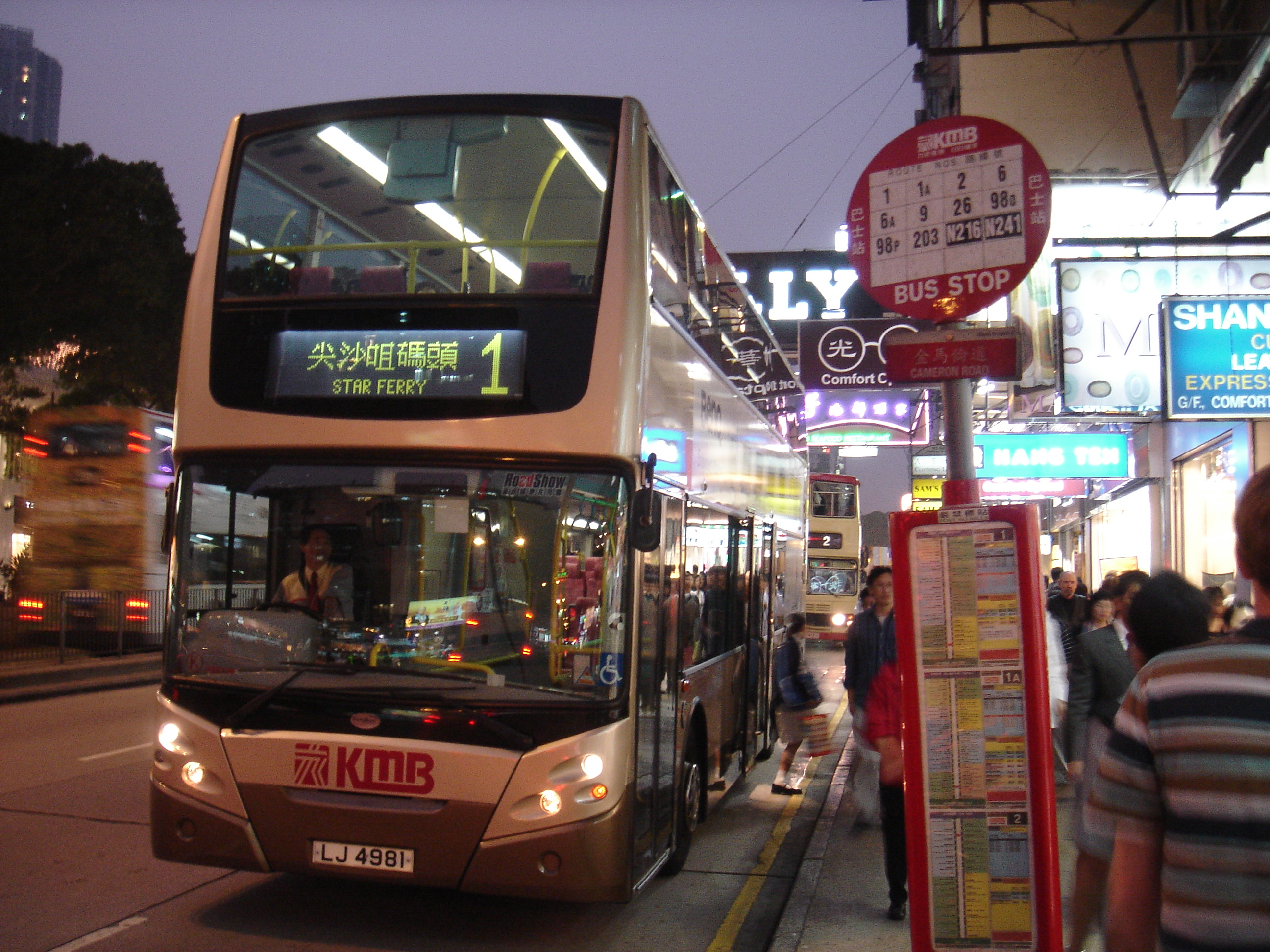
Kowloon Motor Bus TransBus Enviro500.

In the 2000s, the franchised bus companies continued to introduce new super low floor double-deckers. In 2003, KMB introduced the first new generation super low floor double-decker (TransBus Enviro500) with wider (with the width of 2550mm instead of 2500mm) bodywork and straight staircase.

In August 2002, New World First Bus withdrew its last non-air-conditioned buses and became the second franchised bus company to operate fully air-conditioned bus fleet, save one non-air-conditioned open-top bus which was retained for its Peak Tram feeder bus service until February 2008.

In June 2003, Citybus was acquired by Chow Tai Fook Enterprises, the parent company of its major rival operator New World First Bus.

The 2000s also saw the withdrawal of second generation rear-engined double-deckers. Actually CMB had already withdrawn several in the 1990s. When NWFB took over in 1998, they withdrew the rest of these buses, with the last leaving the fleet in 2002. KMB also started to withdraw these double-deckers from 2000, including Leyland Olympians, Dennis Dominators/Dragons and MCW Metrobus. The withdrawal process of these buses was underway throughout the 2000s.

The last MCW Metrobus was withdrawn by KMB in 2007, which marks the extinction of MCW buses in franchised bus companies.

== 2010s: Two-axle air-conditioned double deckers ==
In 2010, franchised bus operators introduced the first two-axle air-conditioned double deckers. KMB introduced one Alexander Dennis Enviro400, Citybus introduced two Enviro400s, later in the same year both KMB and Citybus have received one two-axle Volvo B9TL. The first production two-axle air-conditioned double deckers appeared in 2011.

The withdrawal of KMB's non-air-conditioned double deckers also reached the final stage in the 2010s. In late 2011, one KMB's non-air-conditioned double decker received advertisement banners, stating "Farewell KMB Non Air-Conditioned Bus (2012)". The last non-air-conditioned buses were removed from service on 9 May 2012 when the last four KMB routes were converted to fully air-conditioned bus services, thus ending the service of franchised non-air-conditioned buses in Hong Kong.

In 2013, KMB evaluated one BYD K9A fully electric single-decker bus, including a one-month trial run on route 2. It was the first fully electric bus used on franchised bus services. The bus was returned to BYD in December 2013.

In 2014, KMB, New World First Bus and Citybus introduced its first series diesel-electric hybrid buses, which is funded by the Hong Kong Government for trial of at least two years. Also during the same year, KMB and Citybus launched their first 12.8-metre high-capacity buses, which it claims would be more environmentally friendly since its larger capacity means carrying more passengers with fewer vehicles on road.

The last non-wheelchair-accessible buses will be withdrawn by 2017, apart from New Lantao Bus because of terrain constraints. New World First Bus has already been upgraded to full low-floor fleet with effect from 5 September 2015.

== 2020s: NWFB and Citybus merge ==
New World First Bus and Citybus merged their operations under the Citybus brand on 1 July 2023, and NWFB's "Rickshaw Sightseeing Bus" was rebranded as "HK City Sightseeing". Kowloon Motor Bus also introduced its sightseeing bus service on route HK1 using open-top double-decker buses in August 2025.
