= Jubilant =

Jubilant may refer to:

- Dennis Jubilant, a double decker bus chassis
- Jubilant FoodWorks, an Indian company
- Jubilant Power, 1976 album by Ted Curson
- Jubilant Sykes, African-American baritone
