= Network 26 =

Network of 26 franchised bus routes on Hong Kong Island

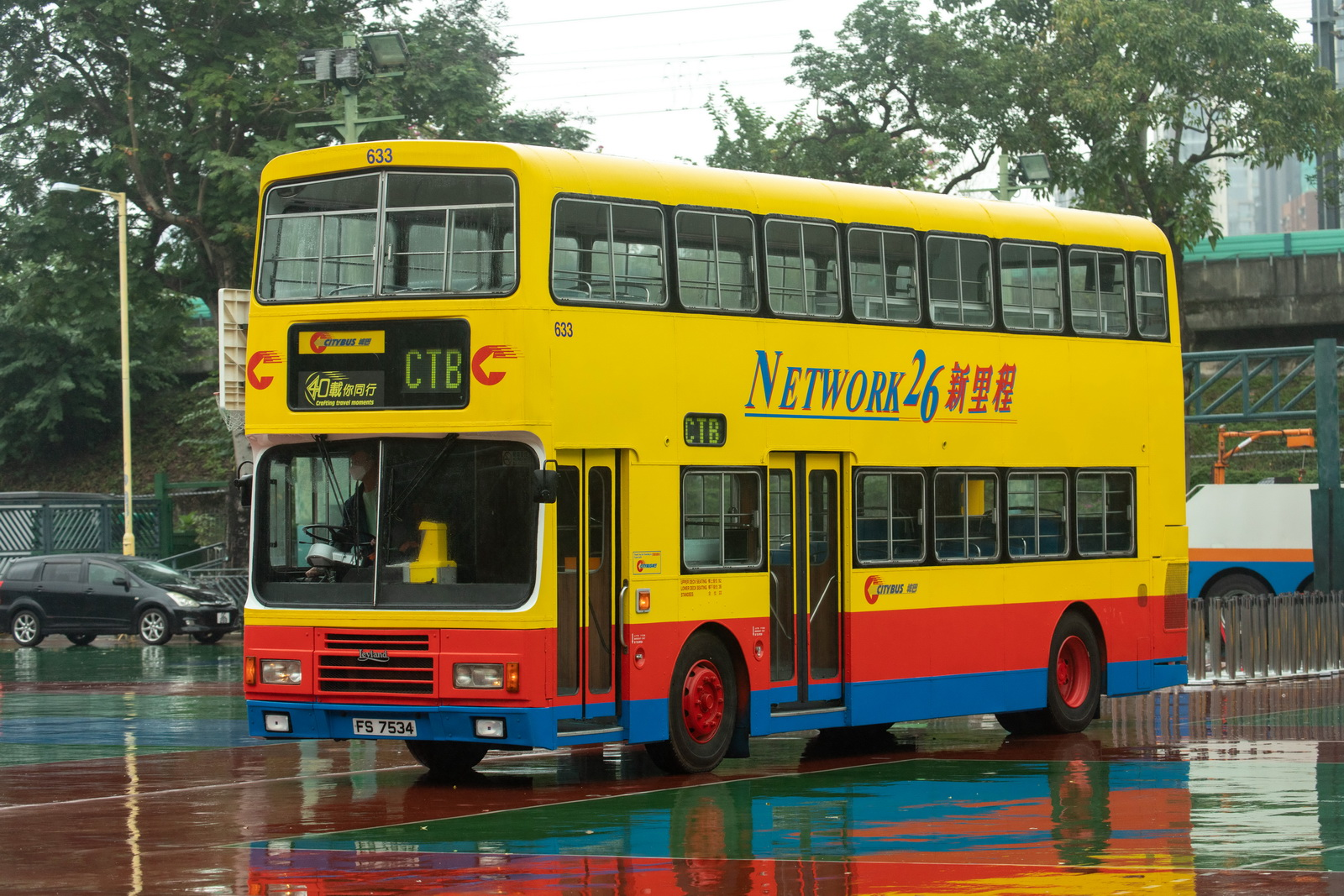
Preserved Citybus Network 26 ex-Singapore Bus Services Leyland Atlantean in November 2022

Network 26 is a network of 26 bus routes on Hong Kong Island, which were previously operated by China Motor Bus (CMB) before being annexed to Citybus by the Government of Hong Kong on 1 September 1993.

== Background ==
After CMB's heyday in the 1960s and 1970s, its service quality started to deteriorate in the 1980s, with service delays and aging vehicles.

On 30 November 1989, CMB staff went on strike in a retirement pay dispute. CMB services were completely suspended, and traffic on Hong Kong Island ran into chaos. The most severe situation occurred in Southern District, which had no MTR service, to an extent that even police vehicles were mobilized to provide transport services. Citybus operated temporary routes to deal with the situation and, as a result, the Government decided to rearrange bus services on the Island.

Citybus had set its sights on services 12A and 17 that CMB has already withdrawn. It considered that residents of MacDonald Road are richer and needed high-quality bus services. Upon obtaining consent from the government, Citybus announced in September 1989 that it intends to reinstate both services.

In 1990, Citybus applied to start three non-franchised services, namely 37R, 90R and 97R, all serving between Southern District to Admiralty. In March the same year, Citybus applied to operate route 12A, which CMB had previously requested to be cancelled due to low patronage. The application was approved, and services by Citybus commenced in September 1991 with air-conditioned Leyland Olympian double deckers. Other operators such as Argos Bus, Coronet Bus and Hong Kong Buses bidded for the 12A alongside major operator Kowloon Motor Bus, however these soon withdrew from bidding.

Later, seeing no improvement in CMB's services, the Government decided to re-tender 26 of CMB's routes to another company. Two companies applied, namely Citybus and Scottish multinational transport company Stagecoach Holdings. Since Stagecoach had no experience on operating routes in Hong Kong, Citybus won the tender in October 1992. The routes transferred from CMB to Citybus on 1 September 1993, using a combination of new air-conditioned Leyland Olympians and heavily refurbished non-air-conditioned Leyland Atlanteans imported from Singapore.

== Routes ==
The routes included numbers 1, 1M, 5, 5A, 5B, 6, 6A, 10X, 12, 12M, 48, 61, 61M, 70, 70M, 72, 72A, 72B, 75, 76, 90, 92, 96, 97, 97A, 98, 107 and 170.

== Aftermath ==
=== Further route annexations ===
Significant service improvements were observed on the annexed routes, while CMB's service quality remained unsatisfactory. On 1 September 1995, the Government annexed a further 14 routes to Citybus, namely routes 7, 11, 37, 40, 40M, 71, 73, 85, 99, 511, 592, 260, 103 and 182.

In 1997, CMB gave up four routes which were taken over by Citybus immediately: 45 and 47 became 40P and 47A on 3 March, 41 became 41A on 21 April 1997, and 3 became 3B on 2 June 1997.

=== The demise of CMB's franchise ===
Even with the previous route annexations, CMB still declined to improve its services. When the Government decided to implement the Octopus card system in 1997 for public transport, CMB rejected to follow. Furthermore, it failed to deliver proposals that year for franchise renewal due in 1998. On 17 February 1998, the Executive Council discontinued CMB's franchise, which would expire on 31 August 1998. Twelve routes were directly handed over to Citybus, and one to Kowloon Motor Bus (KMB). Eleven routes were scheduled for cancellation with the franchise expiry. The remaining 88 routes were opened up for tender. CMB, KMB and Citybus joined in the tender; however it happened to be New World First Bus (NWFB), a completely new bus operator in Hong Kong formed by a joint venture between New World Development and FirstGroup, which won the tender in the end. At midnight on 1 September 1998, CMB ceased to operate bus services with the expiry of its franchise.

The cancelled routes include: 10A, 11A, 15M, 15X, 38A, 79, 337, 392, 504, A20 and N38A.
