= Leyland Victory Mark 2 =

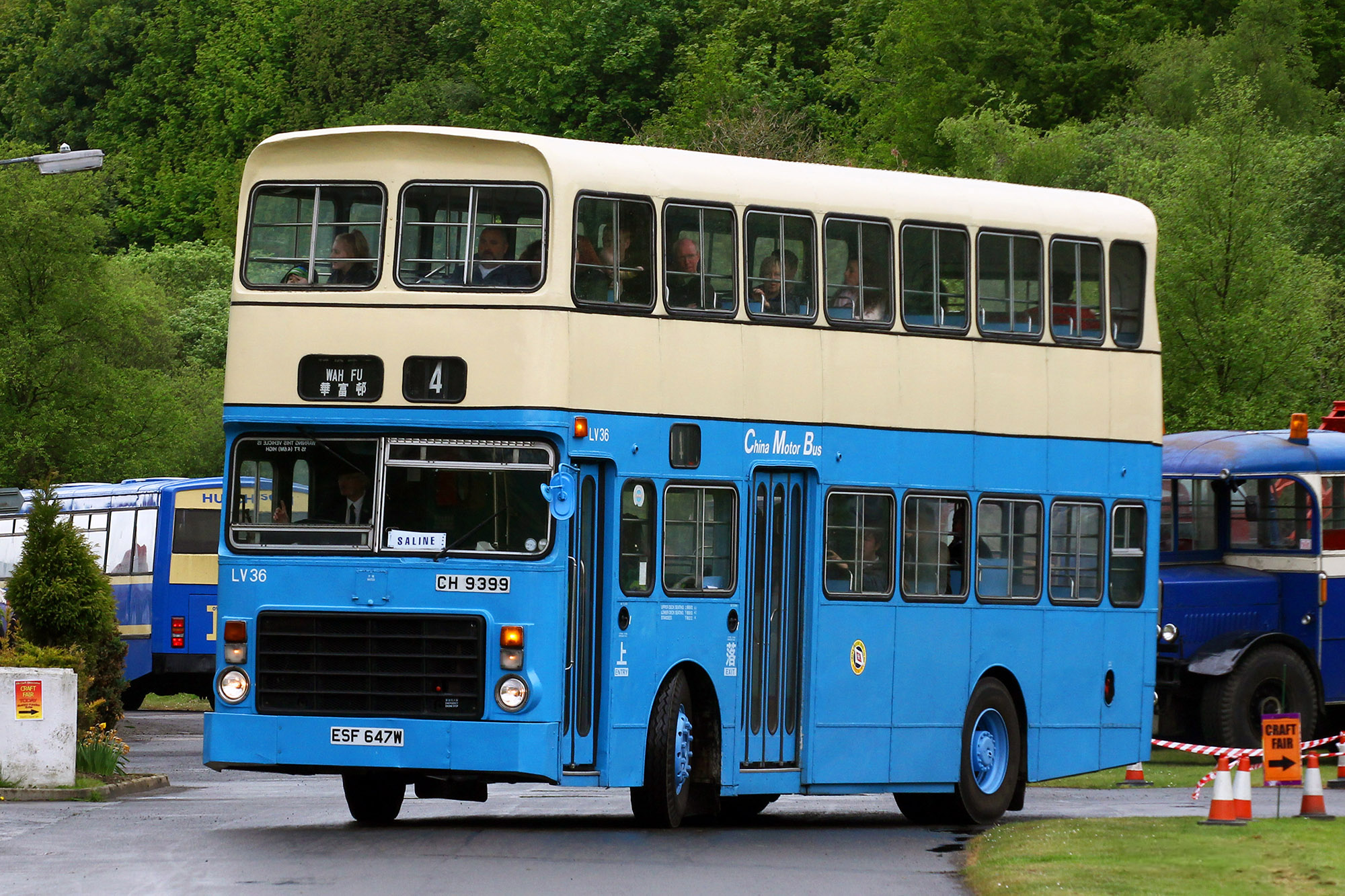
- Preserved China Motor Bus Victory Mark 2 in Scotland in May 2017

Overview
- Manufacturer: Leyland
- Production: 1978-1981

Body and chassis
- Doors: 2
- Floor type: Step entrance
- Related: Guy Victory J

Powertrain
- Engine: Gardner 6LXB
- Transmission: Voith DIWA 851; Self-Changing Gears GB350

Dimensions
- Length: 9.7 metres

Chronology
- Successor: Leyland Olympian (indirect)

A Kowloon Motor Bus’s Leyland Victory 2 Air-Conditioned design

The Leyland Victory Mark 2 is a front-engined double-decker bus chassis manufactured by Leyland between 1978 and 1981. Like its competitor the Dennis Jubilant it was specifically designed for the contemporary operating environment (hilly roads and one-person operation with a farebox) in Hong Kong.

The chassis was developed from the Guy Victory J, which was also chosen by Bus Bodies (South Africa) for the development of its own double-decker. Four examples were delivered to Kowloon Motor Bus for evaluation. It could be fitted with Gardner 6LXB engine and Voith D851 gearbox, but one Victory Mark 2 for China Motor Bus had been experimentally fitted with Self-Changing Gears GB350 gearbox.

Almost all Leyland Victory Mark 2s built for Hong Kong were fitted with Alexander bodywork, but the last 20 buses built for China Motor Bus were fitted with Duple Metsec bodywork.

Elsewhere, single-deck versions of the Guy Victory were also operated in Southeast Asian cities like Singapore, Kuala Lumpur and Penang.

== Operators ==
Kowloon Motor Bus (KMB) introduced 540 Victory Mark 2s between 1979 and 1983, including one unsuccessful air-conditioned coach which later had the air-conditioning unit removed. China Motor Bus (CMB) purchased 167 Victory Mark 2s between 1979 and 1982. New Lantao Bus (NLB) also purchased nine between 1980 and 1983, with a further six buses acquired from KMB in later years. In 1993 NLB sold 10 of its Victory Mark 2s to Citybus which took over 26 routes from CMB on 1 September 1993.

This model of double-decker bus has served nearly all regions in Hong Kong, including New Territories, Kowloon, Hong Kong Island, and Lantau Island.

All NLB and Citybus's Victory Mark 2s were withdrawn in the mid-1990s. KMB withdrew its last Victory Mark 2 in early 1998. CMB operated Victory Mark 2s until the takeover of its routes and vehicles, by New World First Bus on 1 September 1998, the ex-CMB Victory Mark 2s were gradually replaced by new low-floor buses, the last Victory Mark 2s were withdrawn on 31 August 2000.

Four Citybus Victory Mark 2s became service vehicles after withdrawal, whilst some withdrawn KMB/CMB Victory Mark 2s were sold on for use in rescue training.

== Accidents ==
The Leyland Victory Mark 2 has a notorious reputation as an unsafe bus, mainly due to its soft suspension and high centre of gravity, which makes it prone to overturning.

Major accidents involving Victory Mark 2
Date	Company & Fleet number	Route	Accident type	Location
29 August 1980	CMB LV11	4	rollover	Pok Fu Lam Road near Pok Fu Lam Tsuen
1 December 1980	KMB G217	70	rollover	junction between Nathan Road and Waterloo Road, Kowloon
23 August 1981	KMB G94	66M	collision & fire	Tuen Mun Road near Sham Tseng
24 November 1981	KMB G58	45	rollover	junction between Fat Kwong Street and Chung Hau Street
25 January 1982	KMB (unknown)	36M	rollover	junction between Castle Peak Road and Wo Yi Hop Road
17 August 1982	KMB (unknown)	85	rollover	Lion Rock Tunnel Road
12 October 1982	KMB G442	48	rollover	junction between Tai Wai Road and Lion Rock Tunnel Road
14 November 1982	KMB G440	60M	rollover	Tuen Mun Road near Siu Lam
2 February 1985	KMB G208	82M	rollover	junction between Lion Rock Tunnel Road and Tai Chung Kiu Road
10 April 1985	KMB G224	72	rollover	Tai Po Road near Caldecott Road
5 November 1986	KMB G470	61A	rollover	junction between Ming Kum Road and Shek Pai Tau Road, Tuen Mun
17 March 1990	CMB LV21	94	rollover	Ap Lei Chau Bridge (exit at Aberdeen side)
9 October 1991	KMB G493	43X	rollover	entrance of Tsuen Wan Ferry Pier bus terminus
25 July 1993	KMB G305	69M	rollover	junction between Hung Tin Road and Ping Ha Road
June 1996	KMB G159	76K	deroof	San Tam Road
28 February 1998	CMB LV35	66	collision	Unknown

== Preservation ==
Some of the ex-China Motor Bus Victory Mark 2s have been saved for preservation. LV2, LV30 and LV158 are preserved in Hong Kong, LV36 was donated to Scottish Vintage Bus Museum.

== Trivia ==
- Leyland Victory Mark 2 was also known as "chicken" in Hong Kong because of its resemblance to chickens rocking back and forth while in motion, as a result of fitting in a rather soft suspension system.
