= China Motor Bus =

Hong Kong bus operator and property developer

China Motor Bus Company, Limited
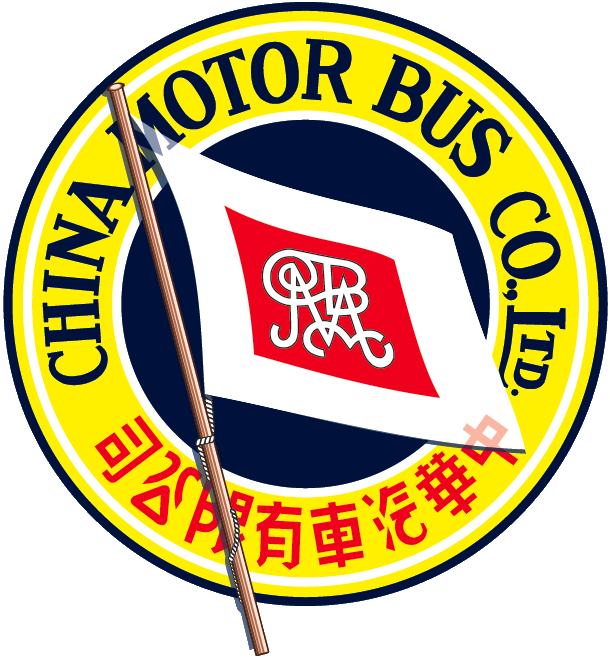
- Company type: Public company
- Traded as: SEHK: 26
- Industry: Public transport (formerly); Property investment
- Founded: 2 September 1923; 102 years ago
- Headquarters: Chai Wan, Hong Kong
- Key people: Henry Ngan (Chairman)
- Products: Bus services (formerly)
- Revenue: $93.5 million (2013/14)
- Website: www.irasia.com/listco/hk/cmb/index.htm

The China Motor Bus Company, Limited (Chinese: 中華汽車有限公司), often abbreviated as CMB, is a property developer based in Hong Kong. Before its bus franchise lapsed in 1998, it was the first motor bus operator in Hong Kong, and was responsible for the introduction of the iconic double-decker buses to Hong Kong Island. Currently CMB does not run any transport services and has since shifted into property development as an alternative means of profit.

== History ==
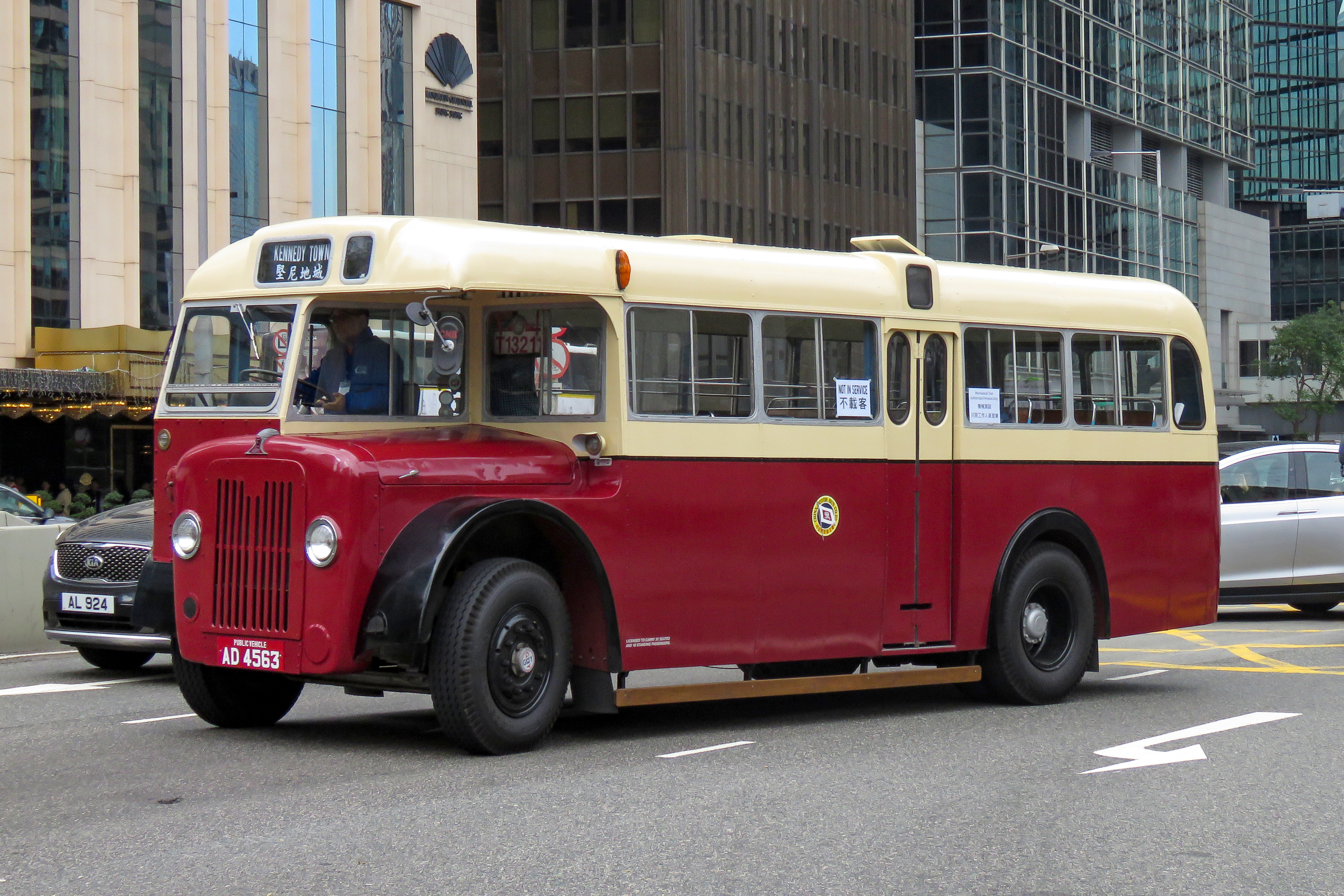
Preserved China Motor Bus Guy Arab V single-decker

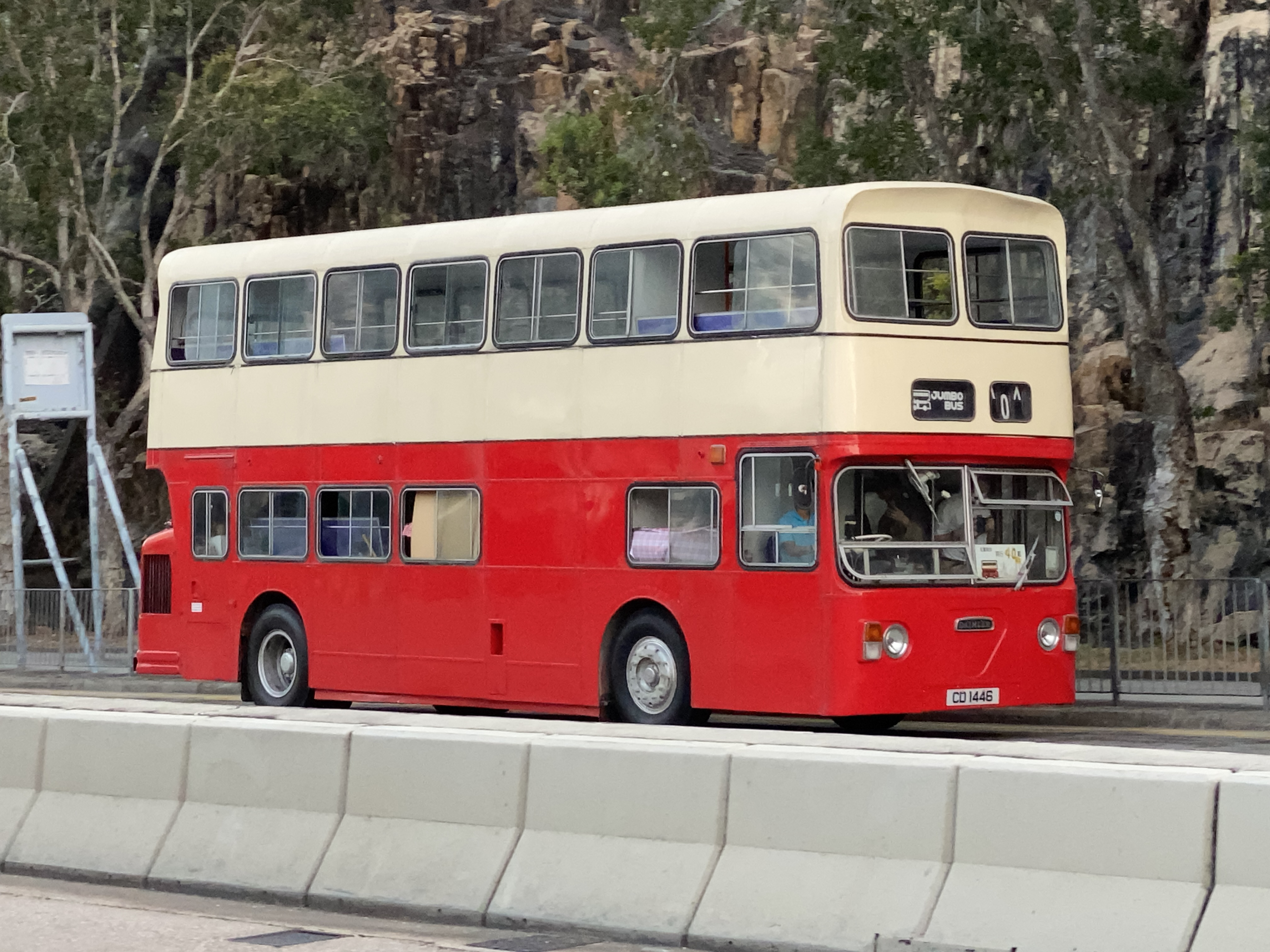
Preserved Alexander bodied Leyland Fleetline (carrying mid-1970s China Motor Bus livery) kept by bus enthusiast, taken in Tsing Yi in February 2021.

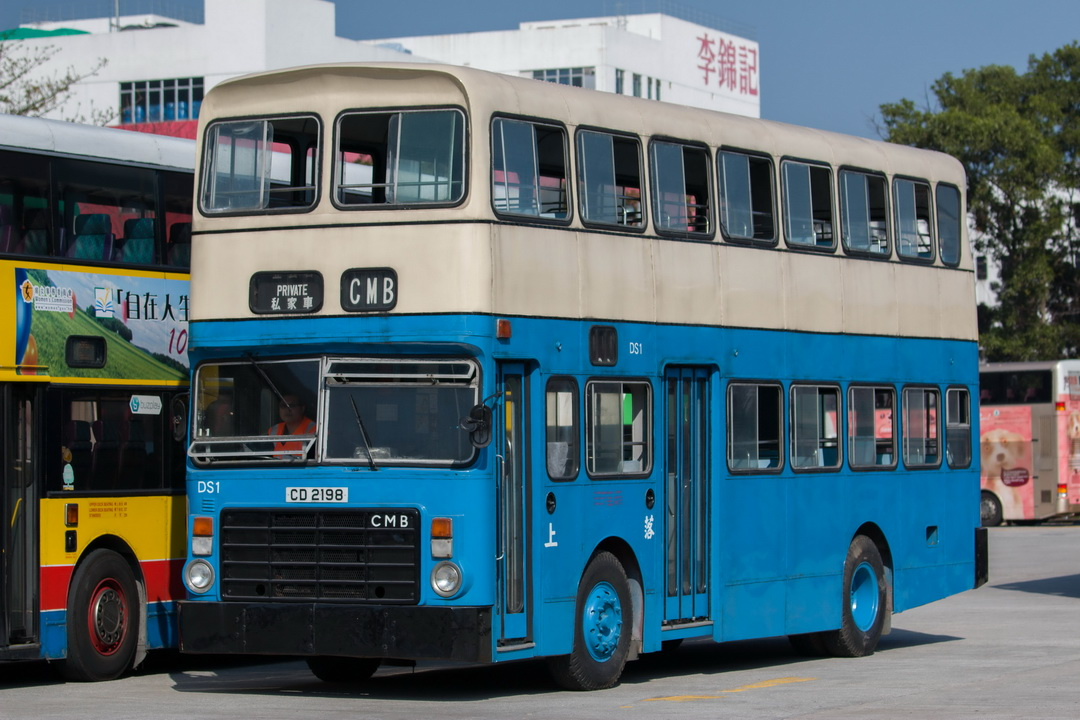
Preserved Dennis Jubilant kept by bus enthusiast.

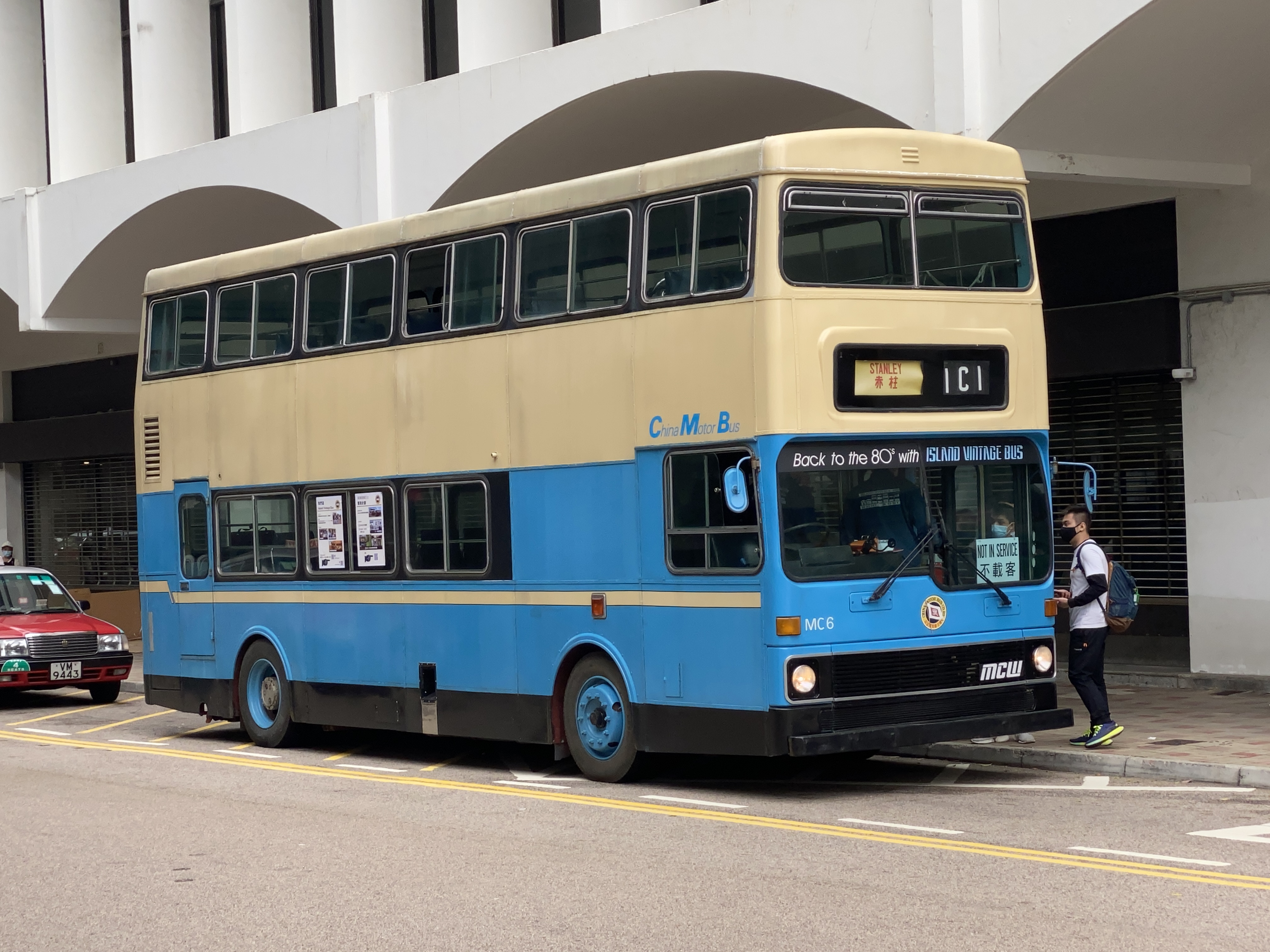
Preserved MCW Metrobus MkI kept by bus enthusiast, taken in Central in January 2022.

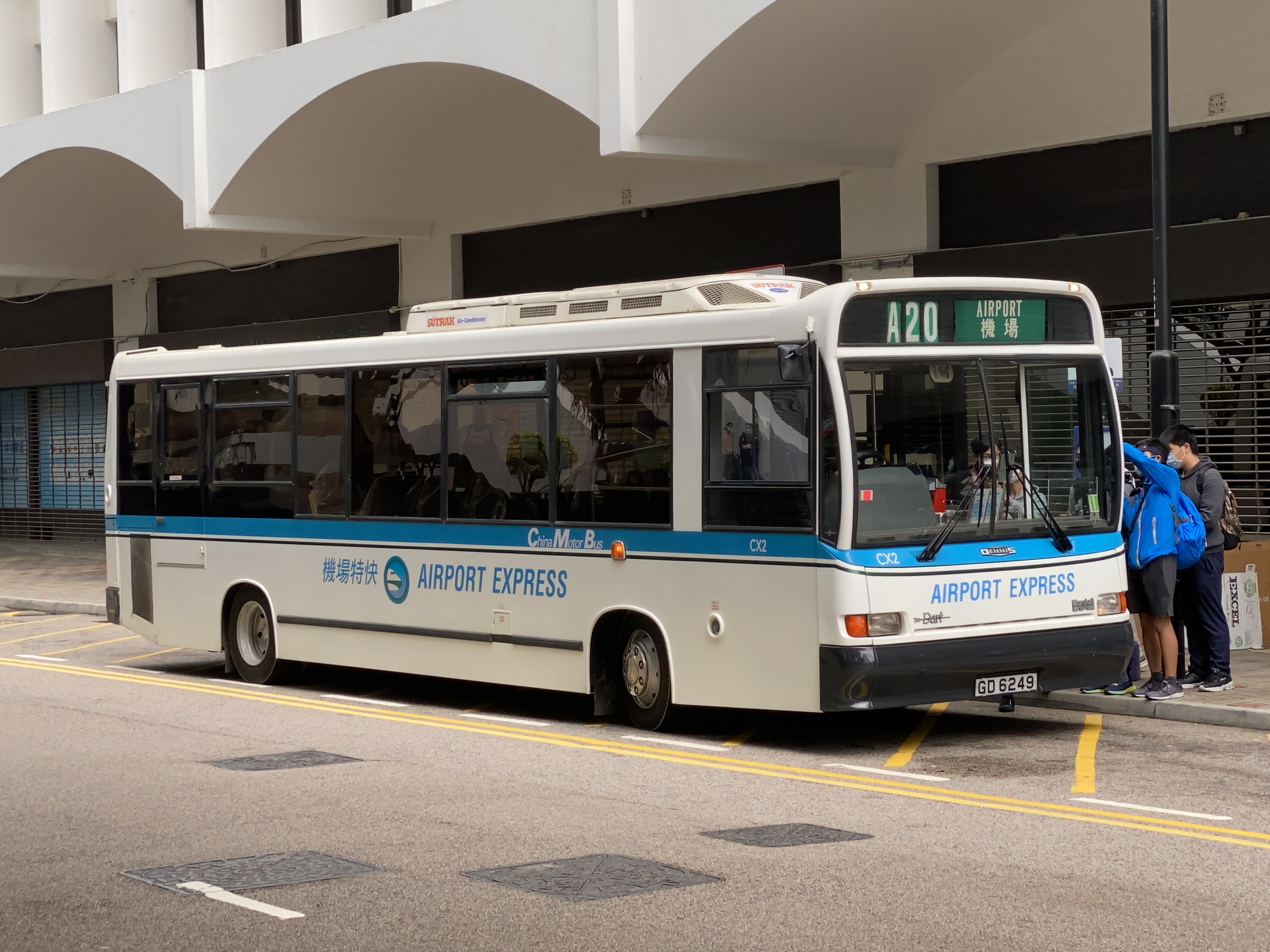
Preserved Marshall C37 bodied Dennis Dart kept by bus enthusiast, taken in Central in January 2022.

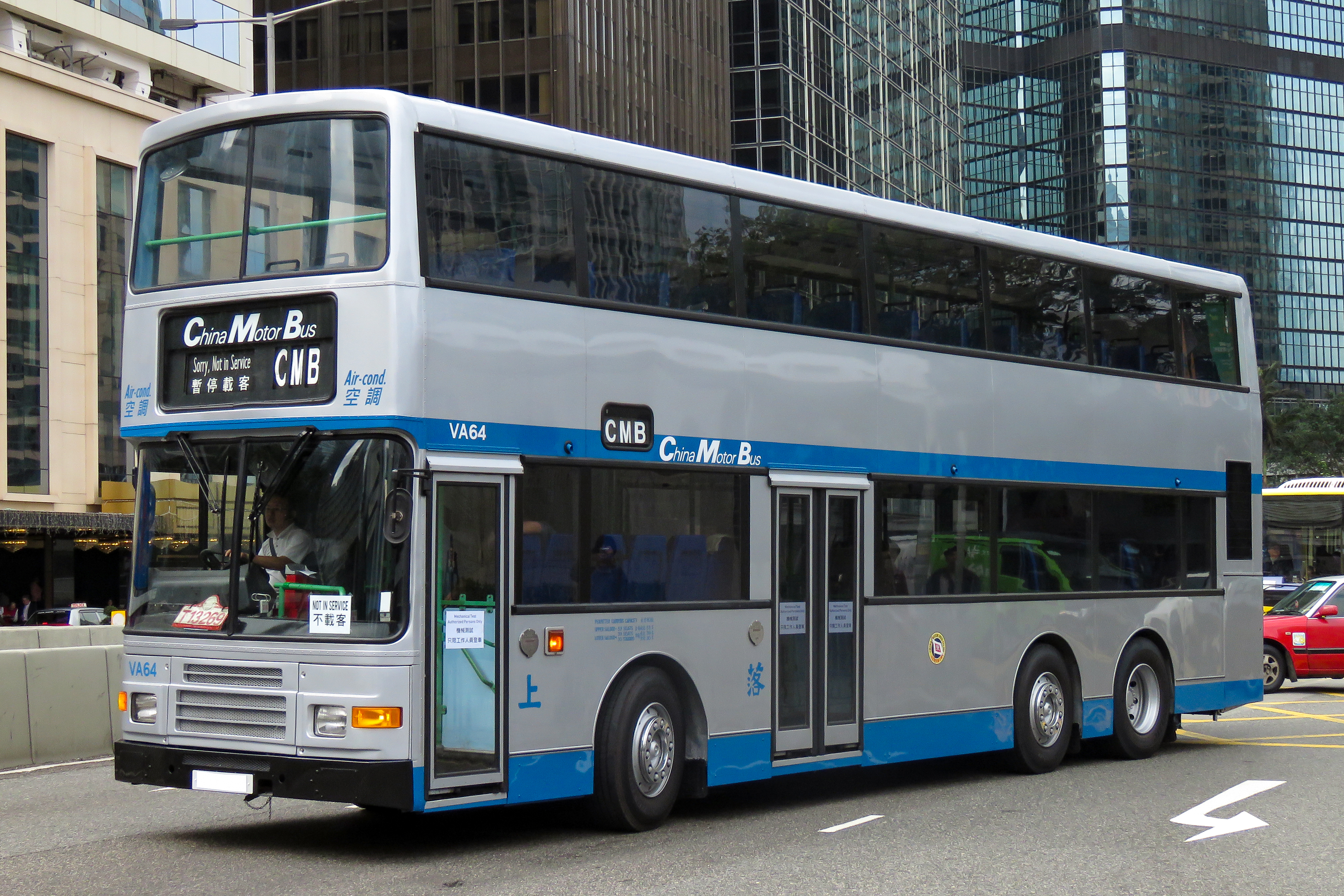
Preserved Volvo Olympian kept by bus enthusiast, taken in Central in January 2019.

Ngan Shing-kwan and Wong Yiu Nam formed the China Motor Bus Company, Limited, in 1923 to provide transport services in the Kowloon Peninsula of Hong Kong. Prior to this, Ngan had operated a rickshaw business also within the Kowloon Peninsula. In 1933, the company received an exclusive bus franchise agreement from the Government of Hong Kong to operate routes on Hong Kong Island.

After World War II, the network of CMB's routes expanded alongside exploding population on the island. New buses were purchased to increase ridership. In the late 1970s, a livery of a buff upper body and a blue lower body was adopted. CMB adopted a policy of improving its service during the 1970s, by introducing a new type of rear-engined bus (Daimler Fleetline) and reforming the route number system. In 1976 CMB earned over $20 million HKD, the highest profit in the company's history.

With the opening of the MTR Island line in 1985, and CMB's growing reputation of poor services, CMB ridership began to decline. On 29–30 November 1989, CMB employees organised a strike, after negotiations on pension funds broke down. During the strike, all CMB services on Hong Kong island were halted. This forced the government to use police vehicles to replace services for commuters travelling to and from the Southern District of Hong Kong. After this incident, the relationship between CMB and the government worsened, leading to the government to adopt more directive policies in respect of CMB.

Meanwhile, competitors such as Citybus Limited had successfully lured passengers from CMB's franchised routes to their own residential routes. Their services provided more comfortable seats, an air-conditioned fleet, and a more direct route (via the Aberdeen Tunnel) from Chi Fu Fa Yuen to Admiralty. Citybus were able to compete against CMB by only the fares on routes which paralleled the more uncomfortable and indirect CMB counterparts.

In 1993, the government redistributed 26 of CMB's routes to Citybus, citing poor service levels. In 1995, a further 14 were transferred.

In February 1998, the government announced the franchise for all 140 routes operated by CMB would not be renewed when it expired on 31 August 1998. Eighty-eight of the routes were placed to open tender, 12 routes were transferred directly to Citybus, one cross-harbour route to Kowloon Motor Bus Company Limited (KMB), and the remaining routes were cancelled.

A joint venture named New World First Holdings (NWFH), later New World First Bus Company, (NWFB), was formed by the Hong Kong-based NWS Holdings and UK based FirstGroup plc. Despite being a dark horse candidate, and never having operated transport routes before, NWFH won the tender for the CMB routes and commenced operations with around 50 new buses and 710 former CMB buses. In 2020, NWFB was acquired by Bravo Transport, the current owner of CityBus. In 2023, Citybus and NWFB were merged with the NWFB brand being retired.

== Current status ==
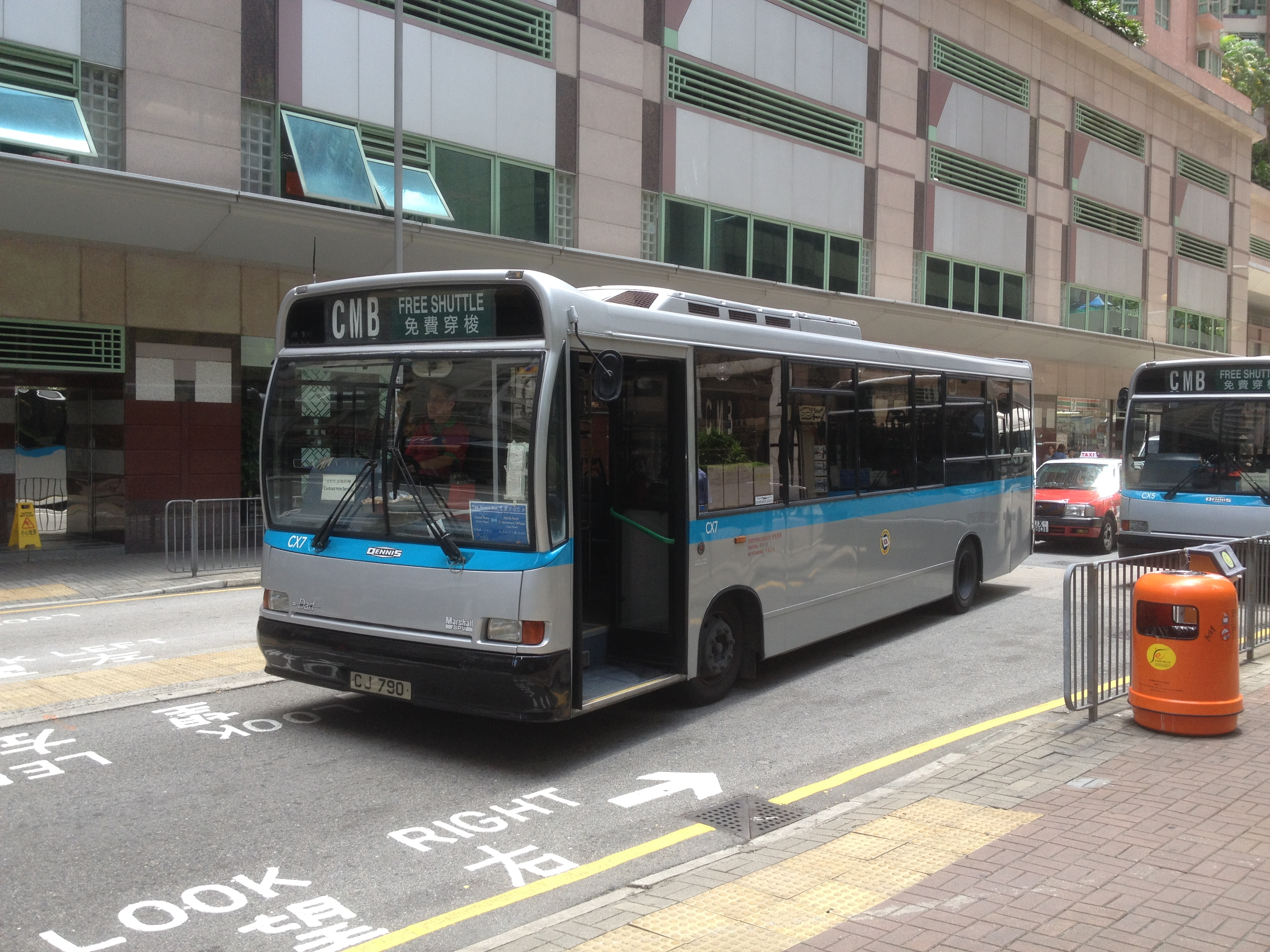
Marshall C37 bodied Dennis Dart on Tanner Road (without "China Motor Bus" words) in June 2015

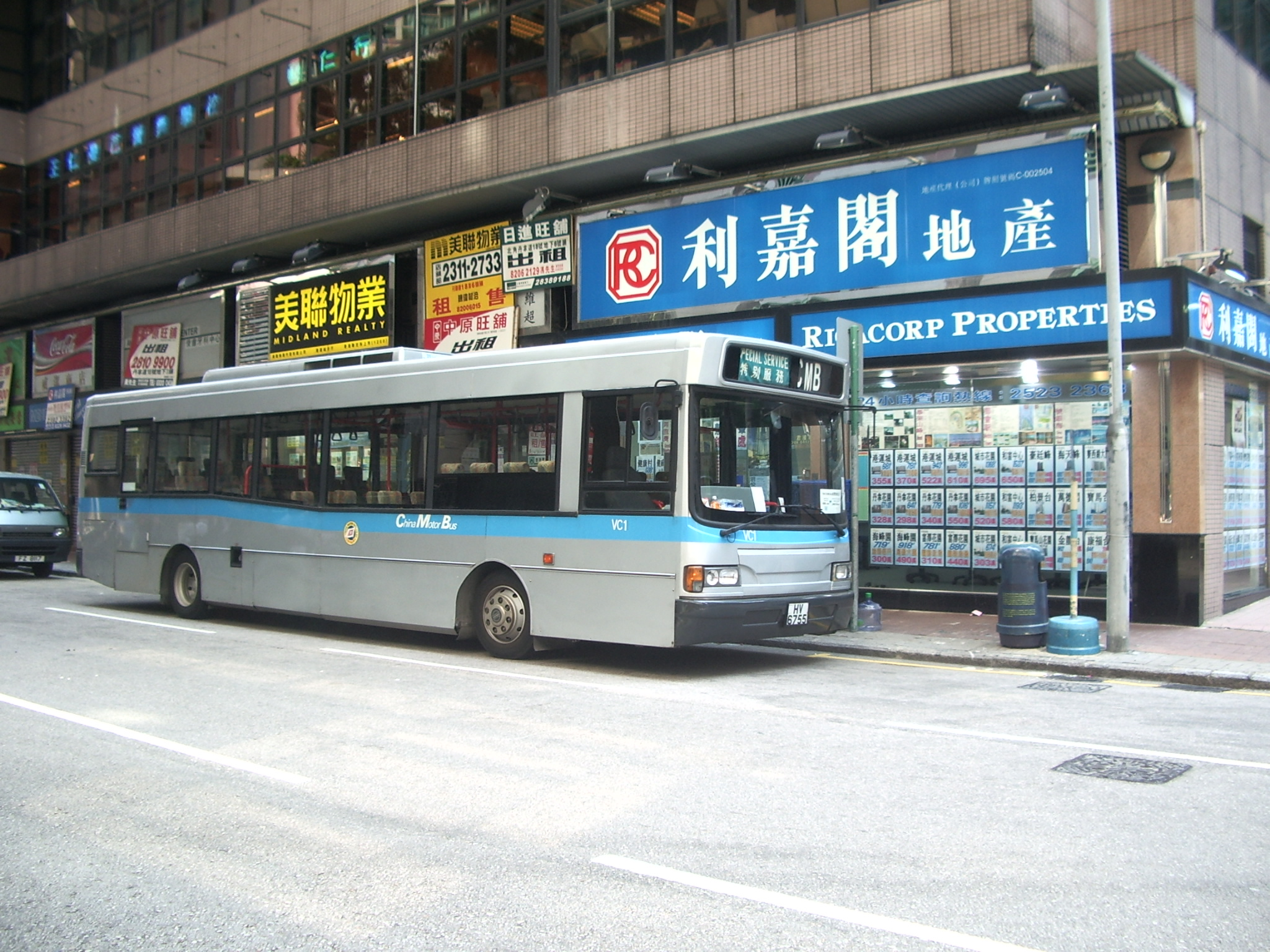
Volvo B6LE acquired from Citybus

Since losing its franchising rights, CMB's main business focus has shifted to real estate, by redeveloping its former bus depot properties. There was a free shuttle bus service operated by the company between Island Place (one of the CMB's real estate developments) near the North Point MTR station and North Point Government Offices with a Volvo B6LE, acquired from Citybus, along with eight Marshall C37 bodied Dennis Darts. However, this service ceased on 30 June 2015 as the new environmental protection ordinance began to phase out pre Euro IV diesel commercial vehicles.

China Motor Bus has also purchased some properties in London.

== Fleet ==
Besides the eight Dennis Dart Coach Express retained to operate the free shuttle service, most of the fleet was transferred to New World First Bus in 1998 after the end of CMB's franchise. Two Volvo Olympian air-conditioned buses were retained, being sold to Citybus in 2001 with a Volvo B6LE acquired in return.

Some of the buses transferred to New World First Bus were later sold to City Sightseeing in Australia and The Original Tour in London.

=== Historic ===
Partial list of historic bus types operated by CMB:

- Leyland Olympian
- Leyland Atlantean
- Leyland Victory Mark 2 Series 2
- Dennis Condor
- Daimler/Leyland Fleetline - either new or ex London Transport DM/DMS-class
- MCW Metrobus
- Guy Arab IV and V
- Leyland Titan PD3/4 and PD3/5

== Depots ==
- Chai Wan Depot: 391 Chai Wan Road/Sheung On Street (a 5-storey concrete parking facility, former head office of CMB and major depot since the 1990s)
- Wong Chuk Hang Depot: Ocean Park Road (owned by the Government of Hong Kong) now used by NWFB
- (Former) North Point Depot: site redeveloped by CMB as the residential complex Island Place (construction started in March 1994, completed in May 1997)
- Kennedy Town Depot: a minor depot later used by NWFB, now closed
