= Dennis Dragon =

Three-axle step-entrance double-decker bus

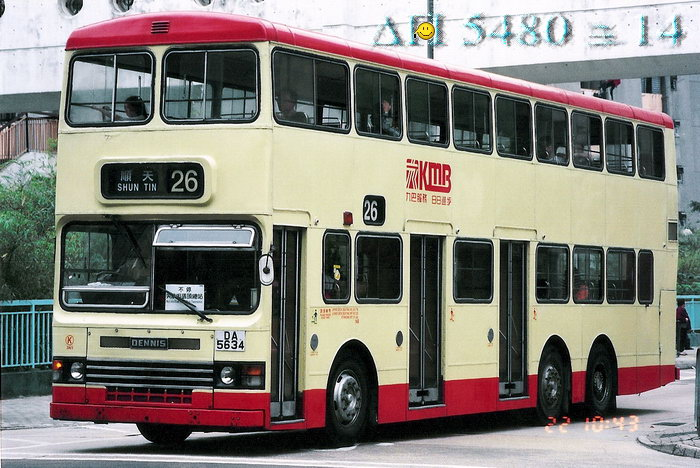
- Kowloon Motor Bus Duple Metsec bodied Dennis Dragon in c. 2001

Overview
- Manufacturer: Dennis Bus
- Also called: Dennis Condor
- Production: 1982–1999

Body and chassis
- Doors: 1, 2 or 3
- Floor type: Step entrance
- Related: Dennis Dominator

Powertrain
- Engine: Gardner; Cummins
- Capacity: 65 to 128 seated
- Transmission: Voith; ZF

Dimensions
- Length: 9.9m, 10.3m, 11m, 12.0m
- Width: 2.5m
- Height: 4.2m or 4.3m

Chronology
- Successor: Dennis Trident 3

The Dennis Dragon (also sold as the Dennis Condor) is a three-axle step-entrance double-decker bus manufactured by Dennis in England between 1982 and 1999.

== History ==
The Dennis Dragon was originally built for Kowloon Motor Bus. In Hong Kong there is an area known as "Kowloon" which translates into English as "Nine Dragons". Buses of this type were also built for China Motor Bus' but were named "Condor" to differentiate the two purchasing companies. All were built for the overseas market, although some were later repatriated.

Dennis had registered the Condor name in the 1950s for a lightweight haulage chassis.

== Design ==
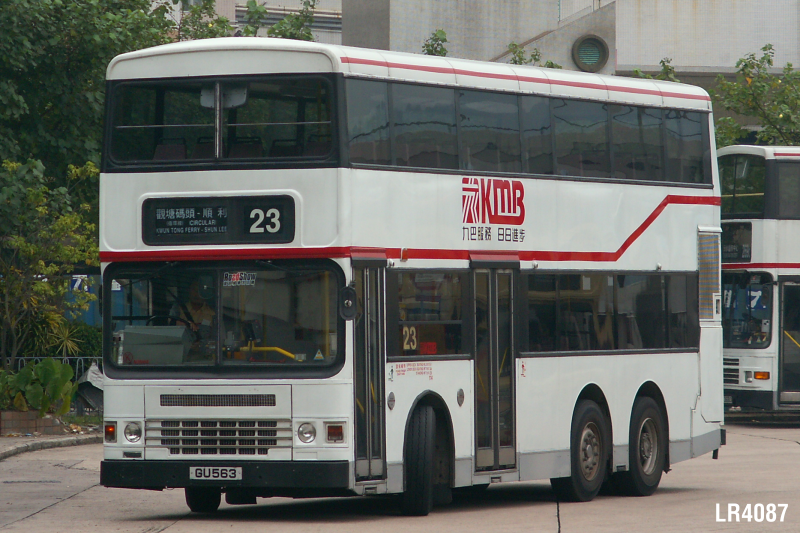
Kowloon Motor Bus Dennis Dragon 9.9m in Kwun Tong in October 2006

The Dennis Dragon/Condor chassis was developed from 2-axle Dennis Dominator, with two separate wheels fitted in front of the rear axle. It was fitted with both Gardner or Cummins engines coupled to a Voith or ZF gearbox. The Cummins engine was initially available as an option, but it gradually replaced the Gardner engine as standard

All Dennis Dragons/Condors, except four out of five prototypes, were fitted with Duple Metsec bodywork. In Hong Kong, this made Dennis Dragon/Condor easy to differentiate because most of the other bus models at the same period (such as Leyland Olympian, Volvo Olympian, Scania N113, etc.) were bodied with Alexander bodywork.

== Hong Kong ==
=== Kowloon Motor Bus ===
In 1982, Kowloon Motor Bus (KMB) purchased three 12-metre non air-conditioned Dennis Dragons with Alexander bodywork for evaluation. KMB purchased 188 Duple Metsec bodied 12-metre Dennis Dragons. These had three doors (one for boarding and two for alighting).

Between 1986 and 1994, KMB purchased the first of 370 11-metre non air-conditioned Dennis Dragons for the bus services of New Territories. Fifty had a closed back, which was originally reserved for installation of air-conditioning, but this was never fitted. All the non air-conditioned Dennis Dragons were withdrawn in 2012.

In 1990, KMB purchased an 11-metre air-conditioned Dennis Dragon for testing. In following years up to 1999, KMB introduced totally 765 air-conditioned Dennis Dragons, including 235 9.9 metre buses, 360 11-metre buses and 170 12-metre buses. The last 11-metre Dennis Dragon [Fleet number AD336 (HC1507)] was retired on March 25, 2015, the last 12-metre Dennis Dragon [Fleet number 3AD170 (HU8420)] was retired on July 25, 2016, and the last 9.9-metre Dennis Dragon [Fleet number ADS235 (JD4215)] was retired on 6 July 2017, which these buses were de-registered for KMB Dennis Dragon units.

=== China Motor Bus ===
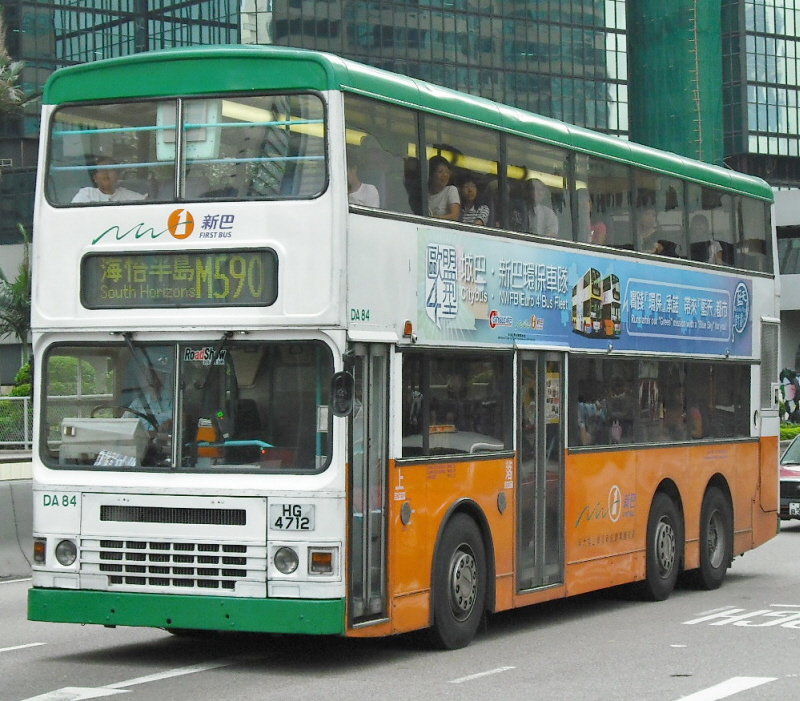
New World First Bus Duple Metsec bodied Condor in August 2008

China Motor Bus Very Unique Duple Metsec bodied Condor Press Photo

In 1982, China Motor Bus (CMB) received two 12-metre (39-foot) non-air-conditioned Dennis Condors for evaluation, one of them was fitted with Duple Metsec bodywork, and the other one with Alexander bodywork.

Because of the opening of MTR's Island line in the 1980s, CMB did not buy many Dennis Condors. Between 1989 and 1997, CMB bought only 46 12-m non-air-conditioned condors, 28 11-metre non-air-conditioned Condors and 92 11-metre air-conditioned Condors. It was rumoured that CMB's last ten air-conditioned Condors were bought due to unpredictable delivery time of the Dennis Trident 3s ordered. All the CMB's Dennis Condors were sold to New World First Bus (NWFB) when CMB lost its franchise in 1998, three of the 12-m Condors were subsequently converted to training buses.

In 1999, NWFB converted one 11-metre Dennis Condor to an open-top bus (DM6), it was superseded by an air-conditioned Dennis Condor on 25 January 2008 and was withdrawn again on 29 September 2014 (DA66). The DLs were retired earlier by October 2000 and were sold out. DL1 & DL2 were sold to private preservationists in Hong Kong. Some of them were shipped back to the UK and converted to open-top in 2002 for the Big Bus Company., after withdrawal in London, most of these went to Big Bus Company's New York operation with one converted to electric drive in 2018.

The DMs were retired by August 2002 and sold out, with an 11-m non-air-conditioned Dennis Condor (fleet number DM28) regarded by NWFB as its last "hot dog" ("hot dog" is a nickname in Hong Kong for non-air-conditioned buses). DM18 and DM22 have been under New World First Travel (as open-top buses, later sold to Citybus and were withdrawn on 11 February 2014). DM9, DM12, and DM25 have been sold to Citybus as training buses, while DM17 was sold to 3 preservationists in the UK.

The DAs were also retired beginning January 2004 for the 22 buses, followed by 38 buses until 2012. All the remaining buses have been retired on 2 September 2015. Some of them were converted to open-top for Big Bus Tours' Hong Kong operation until 2017, then it was shifted to Miami.

=== Citybus ===
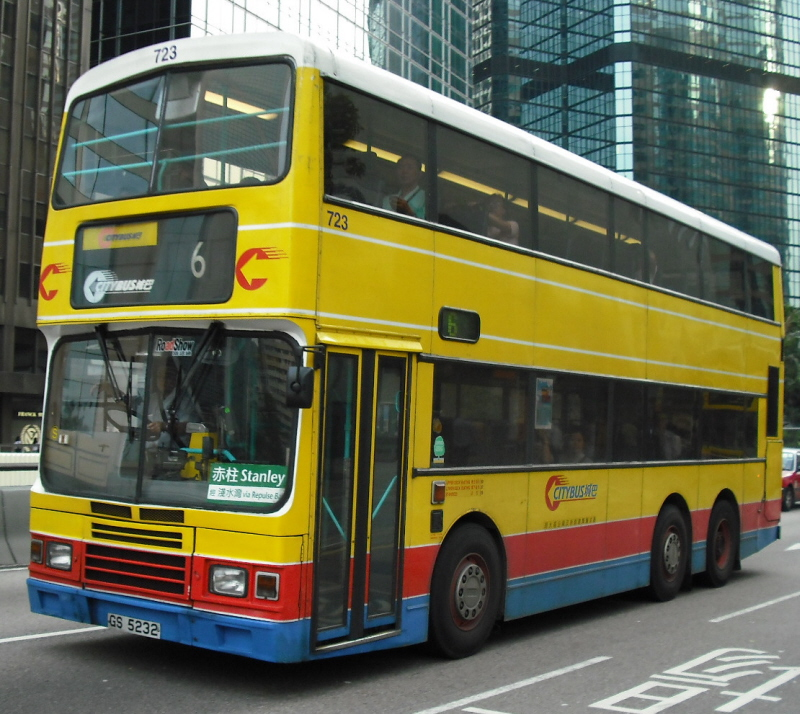
Citybus Duple Metsec bodied Dragon with adopted Alexander R-Type front design

Citybus started to order air-conditioned Dennis Dragon in 1993. The Duple Metsec bodywork for Citybus's Dragons, which were assembled by Salvador Caetano in Portugal, were different from those supplied to KMB/CMB in that the frontal design resembled with those used on Alexander R-type body and a wider front door was used.

Between 1994 and 1998, Citybus introduced 80 12-m Dennis Dragons and 40 10.3-m Dennis Dragons. In 2000, Citybus rebuilt a 10.3-m Dragon (fleet number 701) as the world's first 3-axle double-decker air-conditioned trolleybus.

One of Citybus's 10.3-m Dennis Dragon (fleet number 713) had been prematurely withdrawn in 2002 due to fire damage. All of the Citybus Dennis Dragons were withdrawn in 2015.

=== HACTL ===
In early 1996, Hactl received four Dennis Dragons for use as staff buses. They were similar with Citybus's 12-metre Dragon in appearance but with no route indicators and narrower seats fitted so as to increase the seating capacity.

All these buses were acquired by the New World First Bus after Hactl ceased to operate its staff bus routes in September 1999. They re-entered service in 2000.

== Kenya and Malawi ==
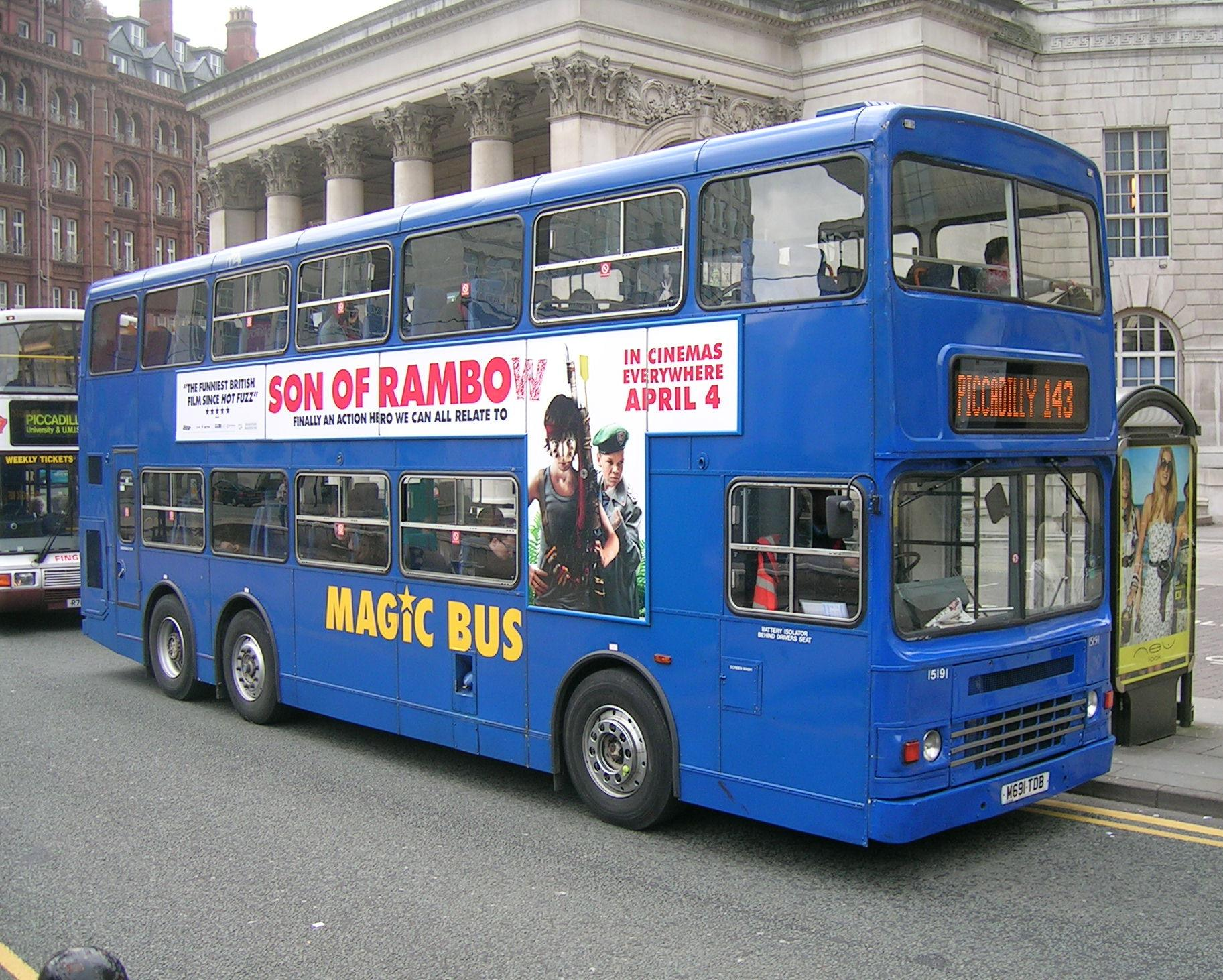
Magic Bus Duple Metsec bodied Dragon in Manchester in March 2008

In 1992, Stagecoach introduced ten Dennis Dragons in Malawi. The company also introduced twenty Dennis Dragons in Kenya between 1995 and 1996.

Later, all the Dennis Dragons in Kenya were shipped back to England and allocated to Stagecoach Manchester's Magic Bus fleet. They re-entered service between 1998 and 2000 where they would stay in service with the company until 2010. Many of them were subsequently used as school buses in Sheffield by BrightBus until 2017.

== Replacement ==
After finishing the last orders, the Dennis Dragon was superseded by the Dennis Trident 3.
