= Kowloon Motor Bus =

Bus operator in Hong Kong

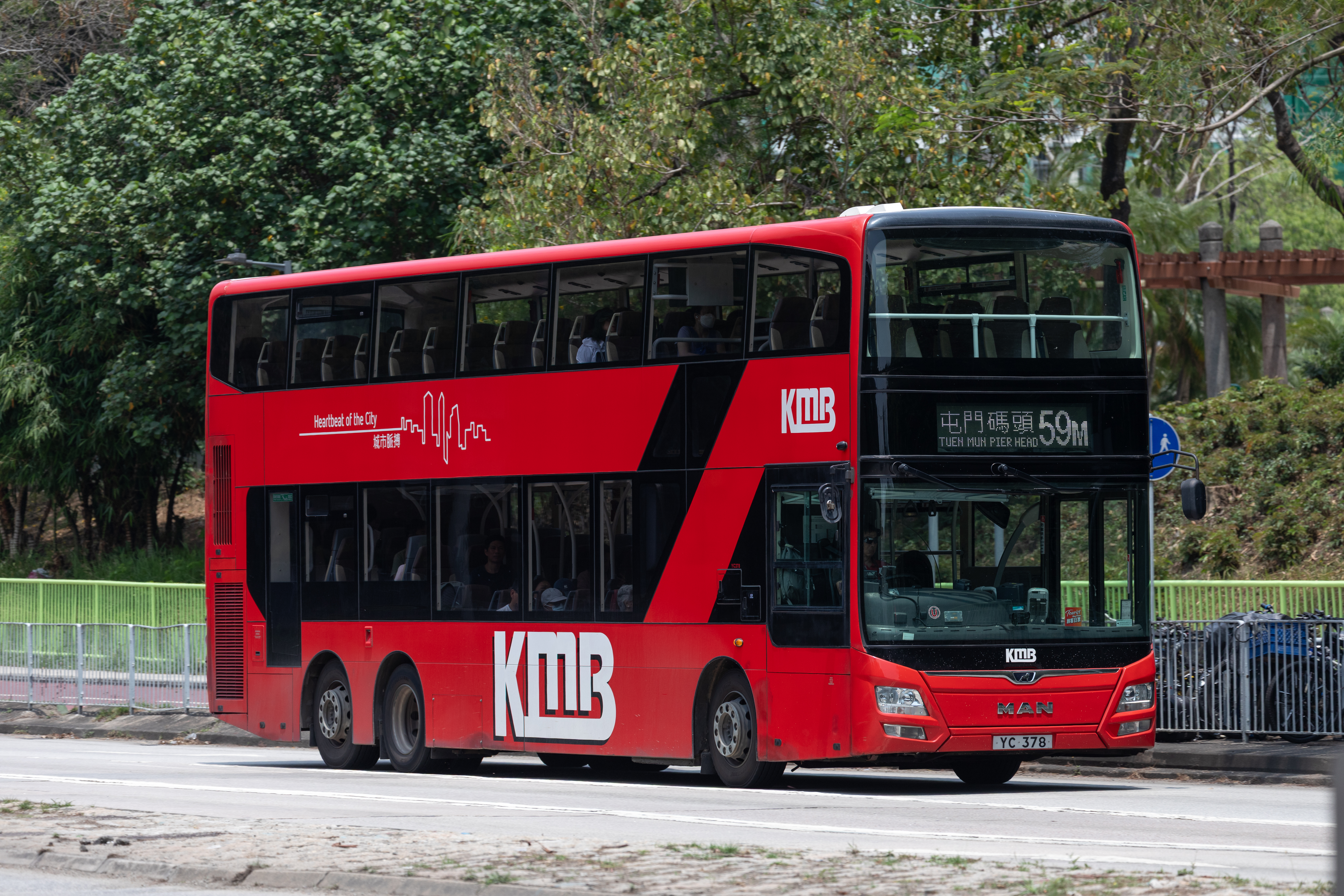
- Kowloon Motor Bus MAN A95 in April 2025
- Parent: Transport International
- Founded: 13 April 1933; 93 years ago
- Headquarters: Lai Chi Kok, Kowloon, Hong Kong
- Service area: Hong Kong
- Service type: Bus services
- Alliance: Long Win Bus
- Routes: 423 (2021)
- Depots: 4
- Fleet: 4001 (2021)
- Daily ridership: 2.53 million (2023)
- Annual ridership: 923.6 million (2023)
- Fuel type: Diesel; Battery-electric
- Website: www.kmb.hk

Kowloon Motor Bus
- Traditional Chinese: 九龍巴士(一九三三)有限公司
- Simplified Chinese: 九龙巴士(一九三三)有限公司
Transcriptions
Standard Mandarin
- Hanyu Pinyin: Jiǔlóng Bāshì (Yījiǔsānsān) Yǒuxiàngōngsī
Yue: Cantonese
- Jyutping: gau2 lung4 baa1 si6*2 (jat1 gau2 saam1 saam1) jau5 haan6 gung1 si1

The Kowloon Motor Bus Company (1933) Limited (KMB) is a bus company operating franchised services in Hong Kong. It is the largest bus company in Hong Kong by fleet size and number of bus routes, with over 4,000 buses - mostly double deckers - and 420 routes. It is a subsidiary of Transport International.

== History ==
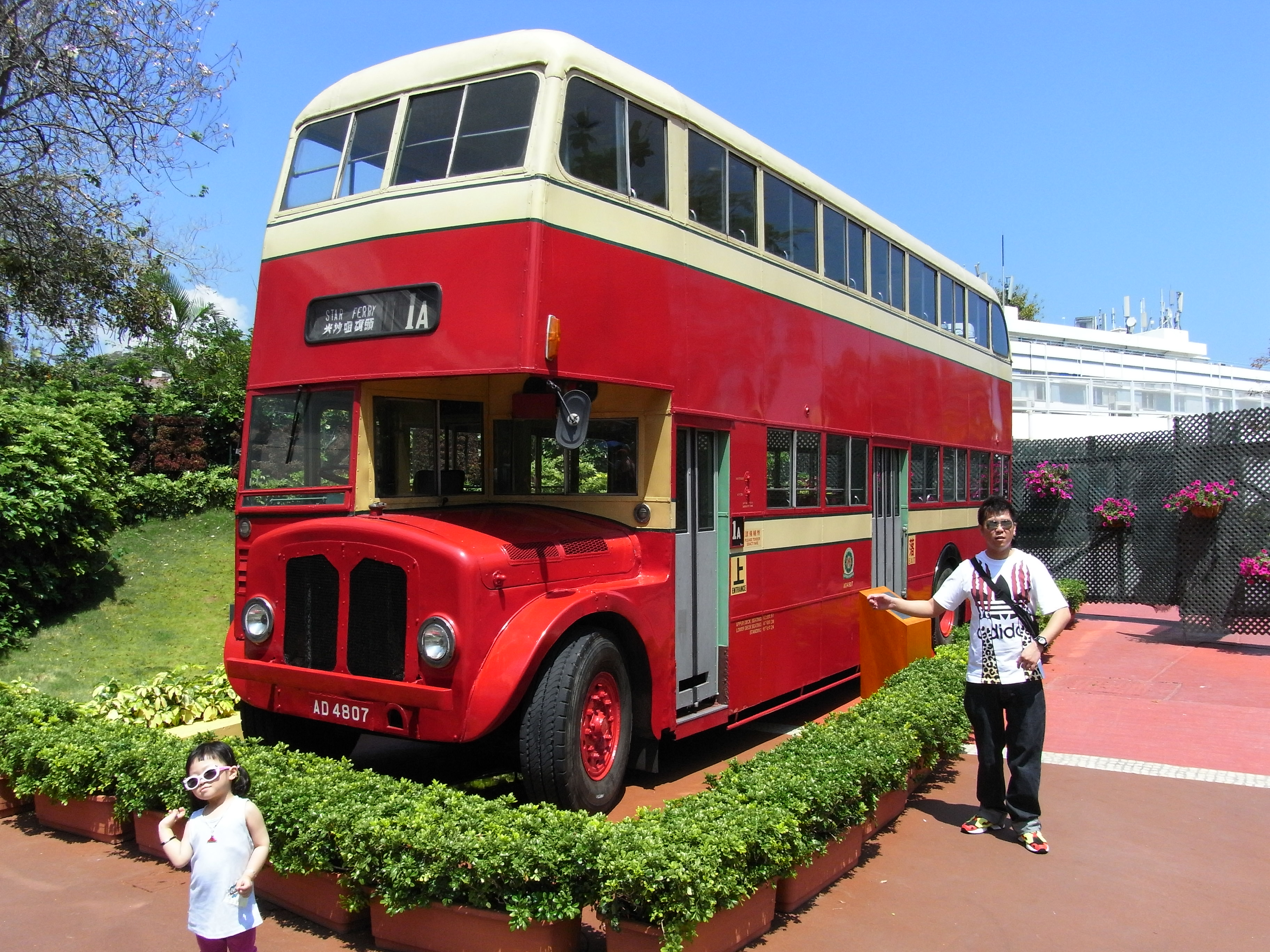
Preserved AEC Regent V in April 2012

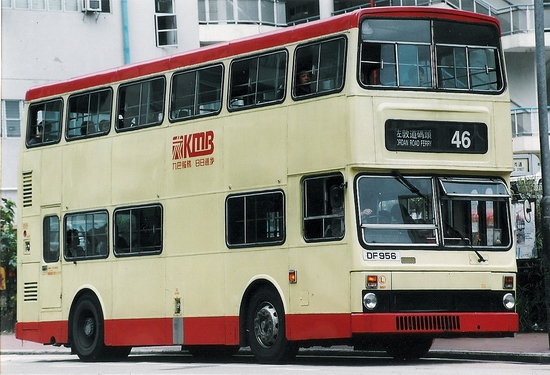
MCW Metrobus

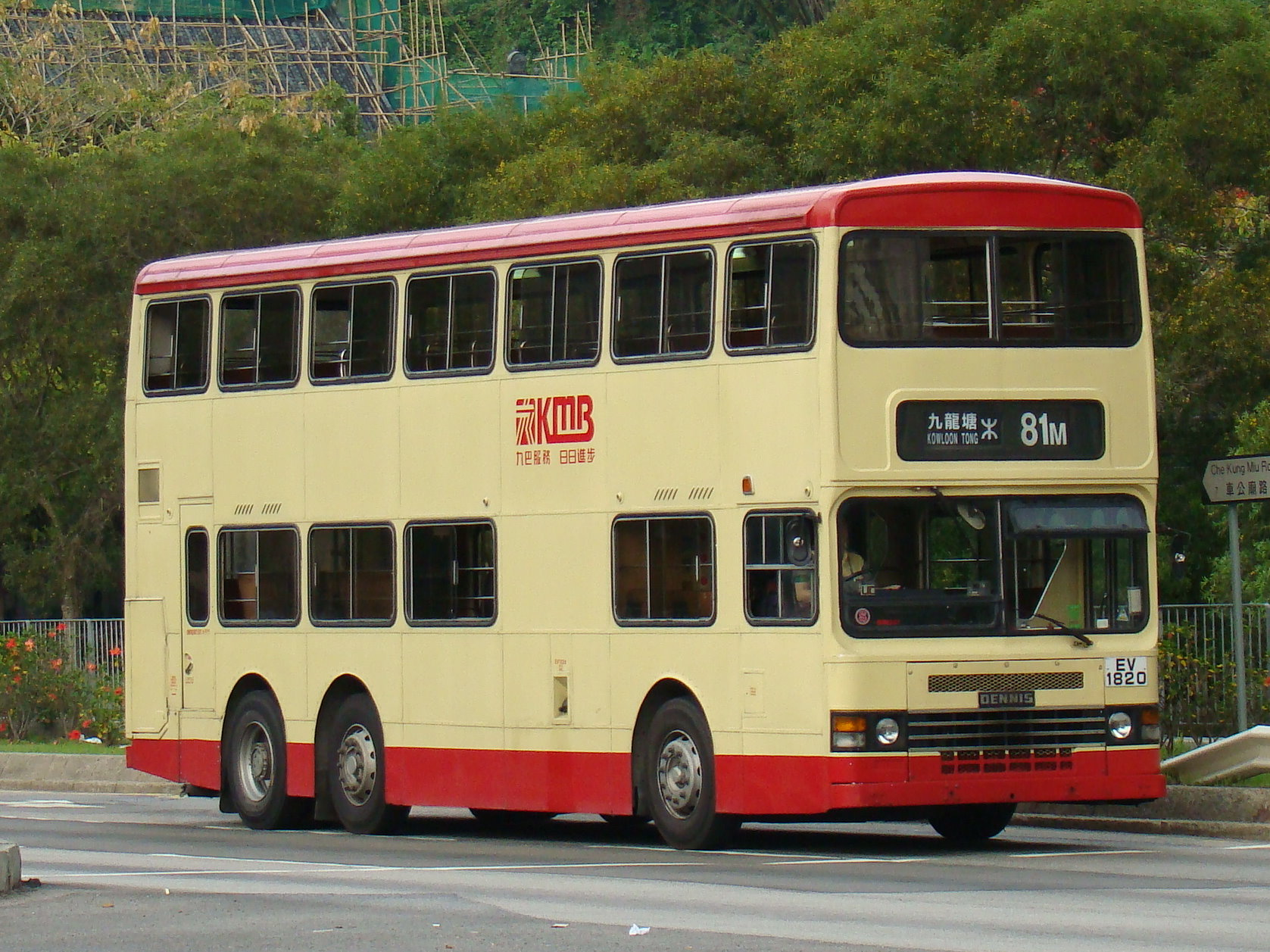
Duple Metsec bodied Dennis Dragon

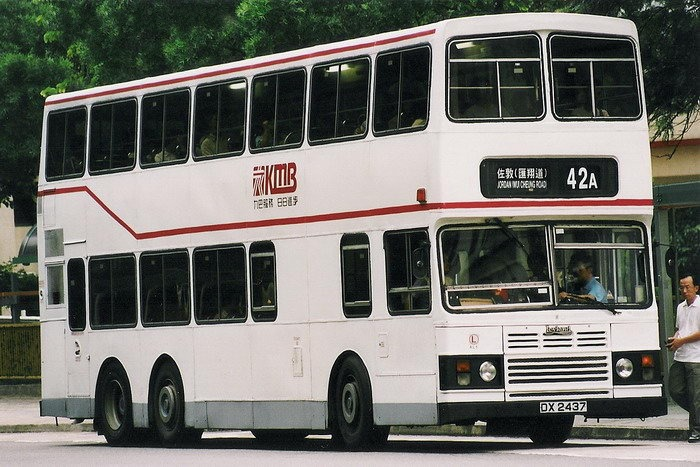
KMB's first air-conditioned bus, a 1988 Alexander RH bodied Leyland Olympian

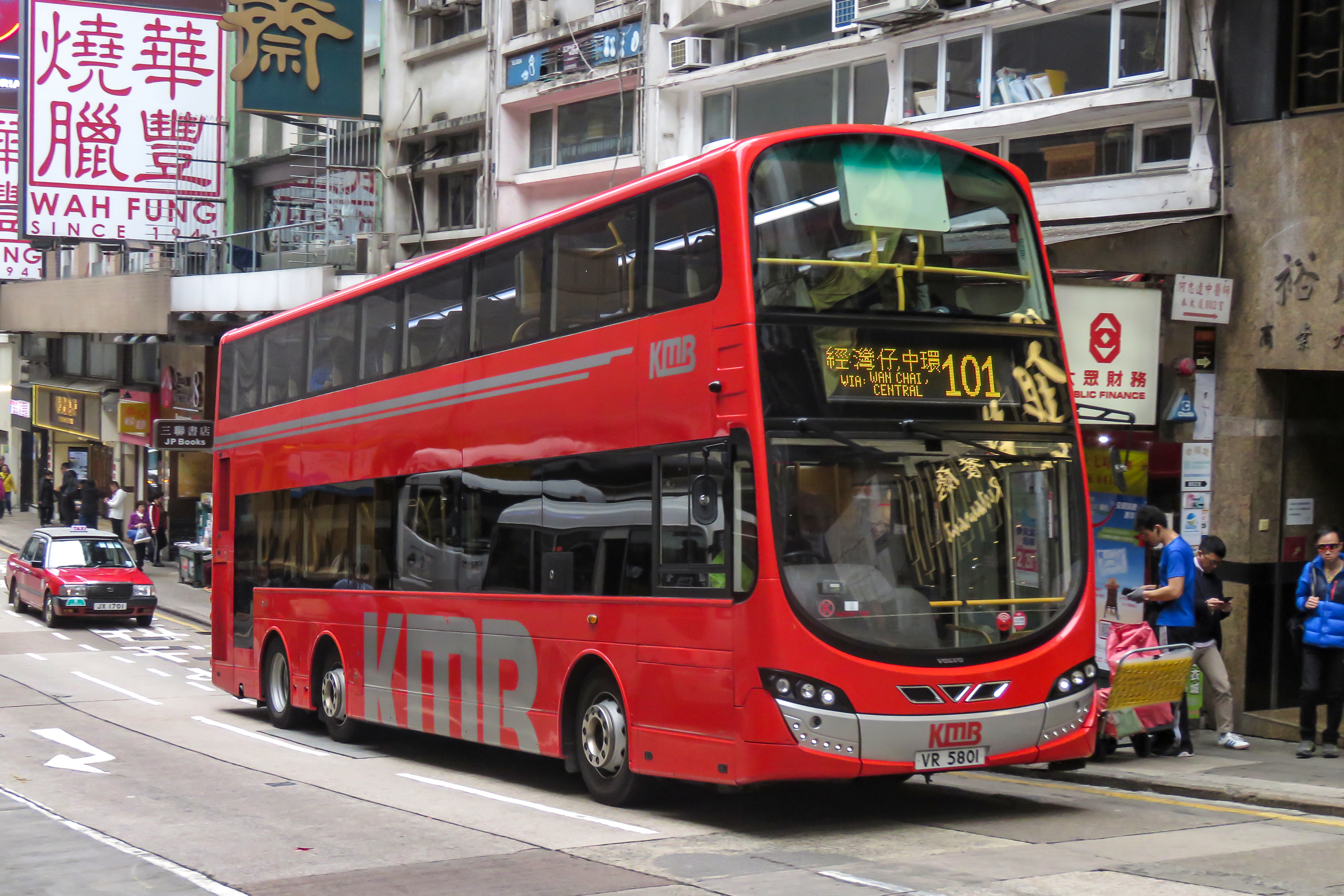
Wright Eclipse Gemini 2 bodied Volvo B9TL

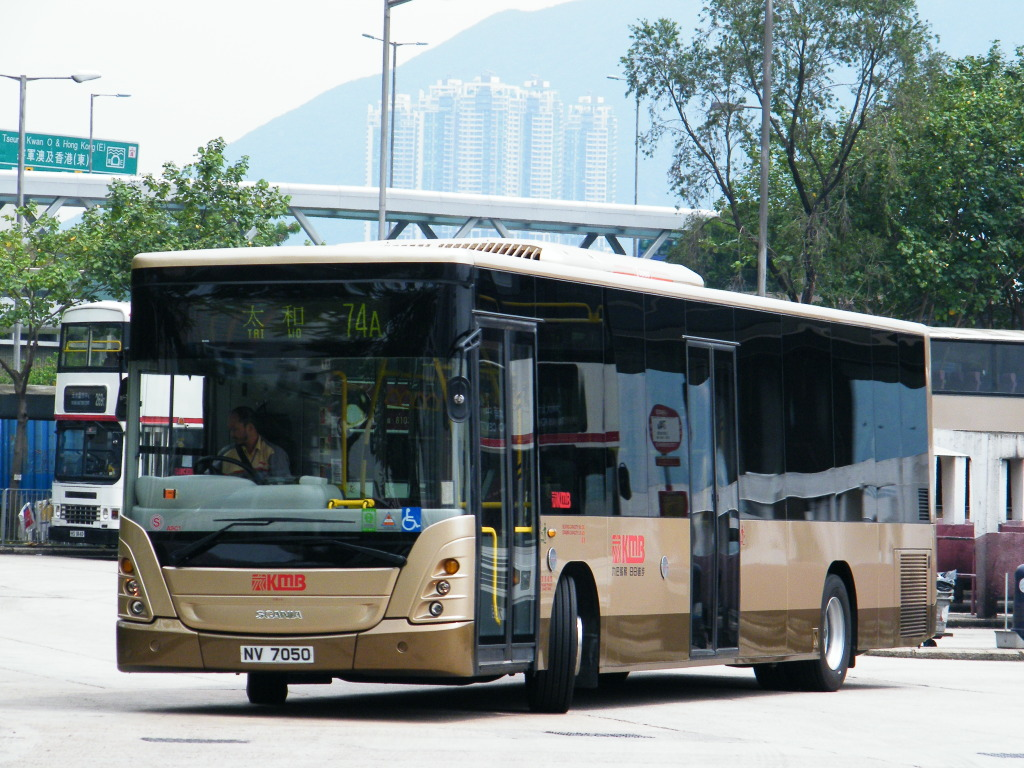
Caetano bodied Scania K230UB

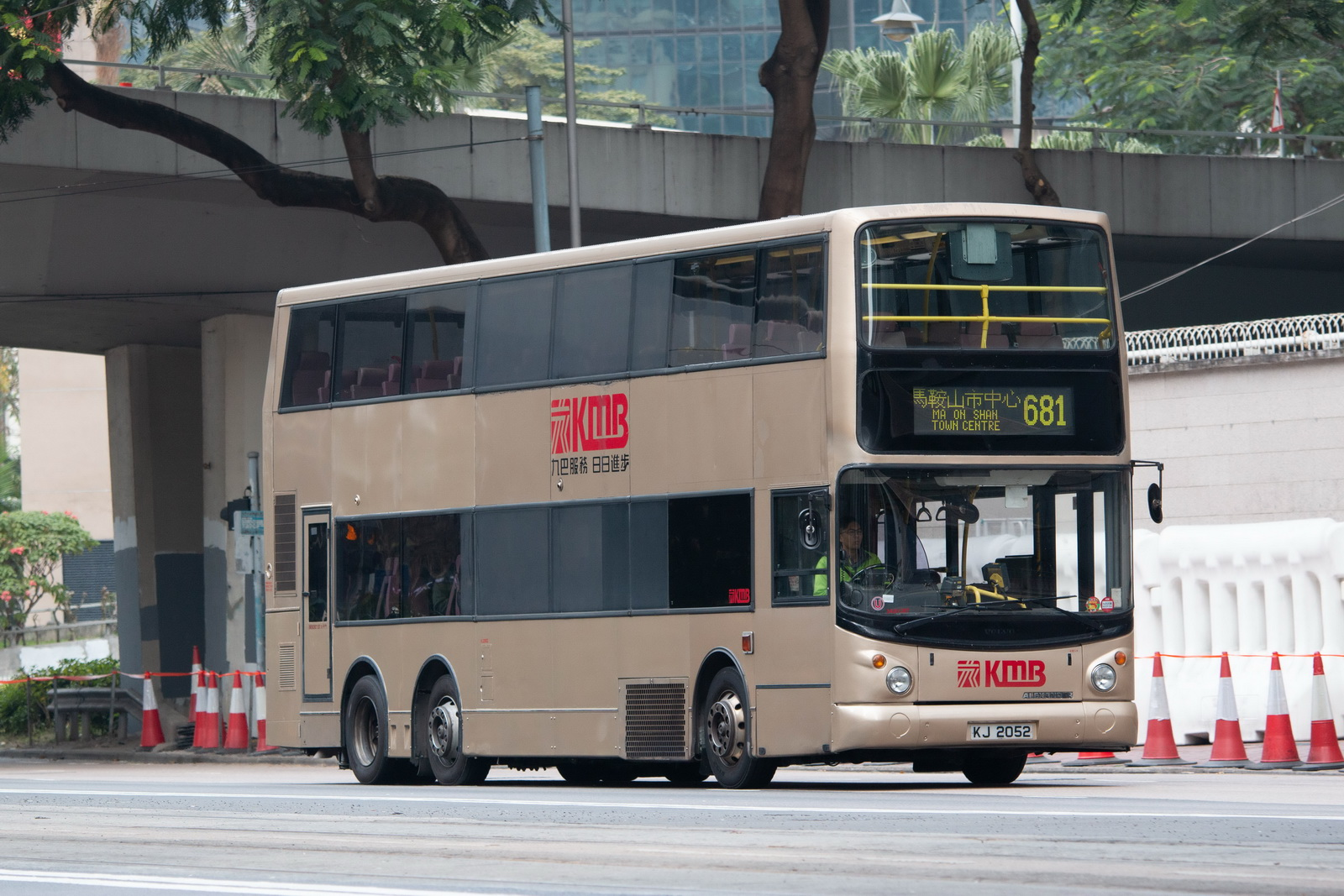
Alexander ALX500 bodied Volvo Super Olympian

KMB was founded on 13 April 1933 as a result of the reformation of public transport by the Hong Kong Government. Before the reformation, there were several independent bus operators working on both sides of Victoria Harbour including KMB.

The Hong Kong Government enforces the bus franchises in favour of the franchisees, while it prosecutes the operators of unauthorised private bus services and other types of authorised bus service that pick up or drop off passengers in franchised bus parking zones.

The KMB franchise allowed for the operation of public omnibus service on the Kowloon side as well as the New Territories. The inaugural 1933 KMB fleet consisted of 106 single-deck buses.

The founding members of KMB were:

- Tang Shiu-kin (鄧肇堅)
- William Louey Sui Tak (雷瑞德)
- Lui Leung (雷亮)
- Tam Woon Tong (譚煥堂)
- Lam Ming Fan (林明勳)

By December 1941, KMB had 140 single-deckers operating on 17 routes. As only a handful of buses survived World War II, some lorries were temporarily converted into buses. By the late 1940s, KMB ridership increased with the huge influx of immigrants from mainland China. In 1949, KMB bought 20 Daimler double-deckers from England, becoming the first operator of double-deckers in Hong Kong.

Following the opening of the Cross-Harbour Tunnel in 1972, KMB operated a number of cross-harbour routes jointly with China Motor Bus, the sole bus operator on Hong Kong Island. This marked the first time KMB buses ran on the island. In the same year, KMB began experimenting with buses operating without a fare collector. All passengers would board from the front door and pay the fare by putting money into the collection box next to the driver.

In 1996, KMB launched an advertising campaign to promote a modern image. It was the first bus company to display advertisements in Hong Kong.

On 1 June 1997, KMB formed a subsidiary, Long Win Bus, to provide service on the Lantau Link to the new Hong Kong International Airport and Tung Chung. In 1998, KMB extended its business into mainland China with a co-operative joint venture, Dalian Hong Kong Macau Company. In 1999, due to the abuse of the free fare imposed on KCR East Rail feeder routes (K12 - K18) as non-franchised buses, KCR signed a contract with KMB which stated that these routes would be operated de facto by the KMB as franchised bus routes, while all profit would go to the KCR corporation. This contract is still in effect after the KCR-MTR merger.

In July 2007, KMB commenced operating a 10-year franchise, that has since been renewed until June 2027. In April 2023, KMB celebrated its 90th anniversary.

== Routes ==
As of December 2023, KMB operates 446 routes in Kowloon and the New Territories, and operates cross-harbour tunnel routes. Some cross-harbour routes are operated conjointly with Citybus, while others are operated solely by KMB.

=== Numbering System by numbers and district ===
- 1-29, 201-229: Kowloon Peninsula (Except route 14S, which ends service at Tseung Kwan O Chinese Permanent Cemetery located in Sai Kung District)
- 30-49, 230-249: Kwai Tsing District and Tsuen Wan District
- 50-69, 250-269: Tuen Mun District and Yuen Long District (Except routes 64P and 65K, which serve the Tai Po District exclusively)
- 70-79, 270-279: Tai Po District and Northern District
- 80-89, 280-289: Sha Tin District
- 90-99, 290-299: Sai Kung District
- 100-199: Cross-harbour routes via the Cross-Harbour Tunnel
- 300-399: Express peak hour cross-harbour routes using any harbour crossing tunnel (Except 307)
- 600-699: Cross-harbour routes via the Eastern Harbour Crossing
- 800-899: Routes that operate from Sha Tin Racecourse
- 900-999: Cross-harbour routes via the Western Harbour Crossing

Routes 200-299 used to be deluxe routes that only operated single-decker buses. In the 1990s, it became mandatory for routes 200–299 to be fully air-conditioned. Since the withdrawal of the last non air-conditioned bus in 2012, all bus routes run by KMB are required to have an inbuilt air-conditioning system.

=== Letter Assignments in bus routes ===
- Prefixes
  - A: Airport bus routes to and formerly serving Kai Tak Airport. KMB no longer operates any of these routes, and the services provided for the Hong Kong International Airport are provided by Long Win Bus instead.
  - B: Border area routes
  - H: Hospital routes, operated once during the 2002–2004 SARS outbreak
  - HK: Formerly used for bus routes service Shatin Racecourse during the 2008 Beijing Olympics, this prefix is now used for the company's open-top tour bus service
  - K: Feeder routes to railway lines operated formerly by the Kowloon–Canton Railway Corporation, de facto operated by the MTR (not to be confused with the K prefix routes operated by the MTR themselves)
  - M: Feeder routes to the Airport Express (MTR), now cancelled
  - N: Late-night bus routes
  - P: Deluxe bus services for cross-harbour New Territories routes (e.g. P960, P968)
  - PB: Routes where owners are allowed to travel with their pets (e.g. PB1, PB2)
  - R: Routes for marathon events (e.g. R230), and Routes to and from Hong Kong Disneyland (e.g. R33)
  - SP:Routes that operate from Kai Tak Sports Ground (e.g. SP1,SP7)
  - T: Express bus routes operated during peak hours to help relieve the heavy passenger load of the East Rail line
  - W: Feeder routes to the Shenzhen–Hong Kong high-speed train terminus at West Kowloon Station
  - X: Express routes
- Suffixes:
  - A-F: May represent independent routes (e.g. 2, 2A, 2B, 2D, 2E, 2F) or branches of a main route (e.g. 33, 33B)
  - E: Express bus routes for some cases such as 40E and 87E
  - H: Hospital routes (e.g. 14H, 32H)
  - K: Feeder routes to railway lines operated formerly by the Kowloon–Canton Railway Corporation, i.e. the East Rail line and the Tuen Ma line (not to be confused with the K prefix)
  - M: Feeder routes to and from MTR Stations
  - P: Peak hour routes, although some provide full day services (e.g. 40P, 8P)
  - R: Routes operated during public holidays and/or public events with the exception of 5R, which provides full day service
  - S: Special routes, including some overnight routes, routes operated due to big events or peak hour routes
  - X: Express bus routes

== Fares ==
Passengers pay the fare in cash (no change given), a contactless credit card (VISA, MasterCard, Amex, UnionPay, Discover, JCB), QR code payment, mobile wallet or using the Octopus card, a smart card payment system. Discounts apply for Octopus users on specified route interchange combinations. To enable elderly people and eligible persons with disabilities to travel on the general Mass Transit Railway (MTR) lines, franchised buses and ferries are charged concessionary fare of $2 flat rate, or 20% of adult fare if over $10, effective from 3 April 2026. The scheme aims to help build a caring and inclusive society by encouraging these groups to participate more in community activities.

In 2018, KMB launched the KMB Monthly Pass. Fares are fixed at HK$780, and are not applicable to MTR Feeder Bus services operated by KMB. Holders are able to take 10 rides on ordinary routes and 2 rides on route B1 per day during the validity month of the pass. Passes can be purchased using an Octopus card at machines installed at major public transport interchanges and bus terminals.

== Fleet ==
As of December 2023, Kowloon Motor Bus operates a fleet of 4,056 buses. 584 Euro VI buses (including 3 diesel-electric buses), 2,935 Euro V buses and 10 battery-electric buses.

KMB traditionally purchased buses from English manufacturers including AEC, Daimler, Dennis, Guy Motors, Leyland, Metro Cammell Weymann and Seddon, that either were bodied in England or locally.

In 1975, the first air-conditioned bus in Hong Kong was put into service by KMB. Following the testing of double-deck air-conditioned buses Victory and Jubilant in the early 1980s, KMB became the world's first operator of such buses. All purchases after 1995 were for air-conditioned buses. In May 2012, KMB withdrew its last non-air-conditioned buses from service. Some of the newer third-generation buses have solar photovoltaic panels installed on the roof which reduces fuel use by 5-8% which would otherwise be used for the air conditioner. This is expected to reduce 6 t (5.9 LT) of carbon emissions on each bus per year.

In the late 1970s, KMB began to purchase chassis from the European manufacturers MAN, Mercedes-Benz, Scania and Volvo.

KMB's original liveries were combinations of red and cream. In the early 1990s, a white and grey livery was introduced for air-conditioned buses, followed in 1997 by a champagne livery. In June 2017, a red and silver livery was introduced, as well as a new logo, dropping its character and Chinese slogan, retaining only the wordmark, but with a darker shade of red.

In the 2020s, KMB introduced a vivid "Electric Green" livery on zero emission buses. KMB expects to have 500 battery electric buses by the end of 2025, which will account for an eighth of the total bus fleet.

In 2024, KMB started operating one out of their 10 Alexander Dennis Enviro500EVs on the Route 112, which runs from So Uk in Cheung Sha Wan to North Point.

== Depots ==
KMB operates four depots in Kowloon and the New Territories. The depot of a bus is identified by the letter K, L, S, or U, and the letter is marked on the bottom left of the driver's windscreen or below windscreen. The assignment scheme is as follows:

- K: Kowloon Bay depot
  - Subsidiary depot: Tseung Kwan O depot
- L: Lai Chi Kok (Stonecutters Island) depot
  - Subsidiary depots: Yuet Lun Street depot, Tsing Yi depot
- S: Sha Tin (Siu Lek Yuen) depot
  - Subsidiary depots: Tai Po depot, Sheung Shui depot (Sheung Shui depot was previously under the Tuen Mun depot until 2009)
- U: Formerly Un Long (Yuen Long) depot, currently Tuen Mun depot
  - Subsidiary depots: Tuen Mun South depot, Yuen Long depot, Tin Shui Wai depot, Sheung Shui depot (until 2009)

In addition, these depots with the exception of the Kowloon Bay Depot are responsible for the maintenance of part of the fleet owned by Long Win Bus, since KMB and LWB are owned by the same parent company.

== Football team ==
Kowloon Motor Bus also has a Hong Kong football club, Kowloon Motor Bus Co. It was formed in 1947 and joined Hong Kong First Division League in the 1947/48 season. Nicknamed "Atomic Bus", the team obtained the only two league titles in 1953/54 and 1966/67. The team attained its peak in the 1950s and 1960s when the "South China - Kowloon Motor Bus Co. crash" (南巴大戰) was one of the highlighted rival matches in Hong Kong. In 1970/71, the team faced their first relegation, but was able to stay in the First Division as Jardines quit the league in the following season. However, the team were relegated in 1972/73. It made its last First Division League appearance in 1976/77, but was relegated after only one season. The football team quit the league in 1981 and reformed in 2017.

== See also ==
- 2003 Tuen Mun Road bus accident – Deadliest accident in Hong Kong's history
- 2018 Hong Kong bus accident
- The Bus Uncle – a 2006 incident filmed on a KMB bus that became an internet phenomenon
- Transport in Hong Kong
