= Dennis Jubilant =

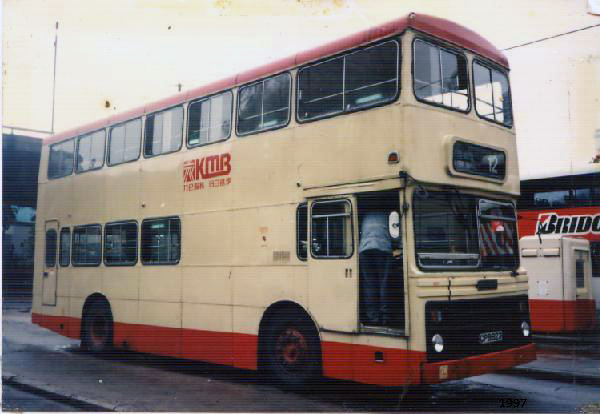
- Kowloon Motor Bus Dennis Jubilant

Overview
- Manufacturer: Dennis
- Production: 1977-1981

Body and chassis
- Doors: 2 doors
- Floor type: Step entrance

Powertrain
- Engine: Gardner 6LXB
- Transmission: Voith DIWA851

The Dennis Jubilant was a front engined double decker bus chassis manufactured by Dennis between 1977 and 1981. It was specifically designed for contemporary operating environment (hilly roads and "one-man-operation" with a farebox) in Hong Kong.

The chassis design featured a set-back front axle, which enabled the front door to be located in front of the front axle, and a strengthened chassis frame. It could be fitted with Gardner 6LXB engine and Voith DIWA 851 automatic gearbox.

== The orders ==
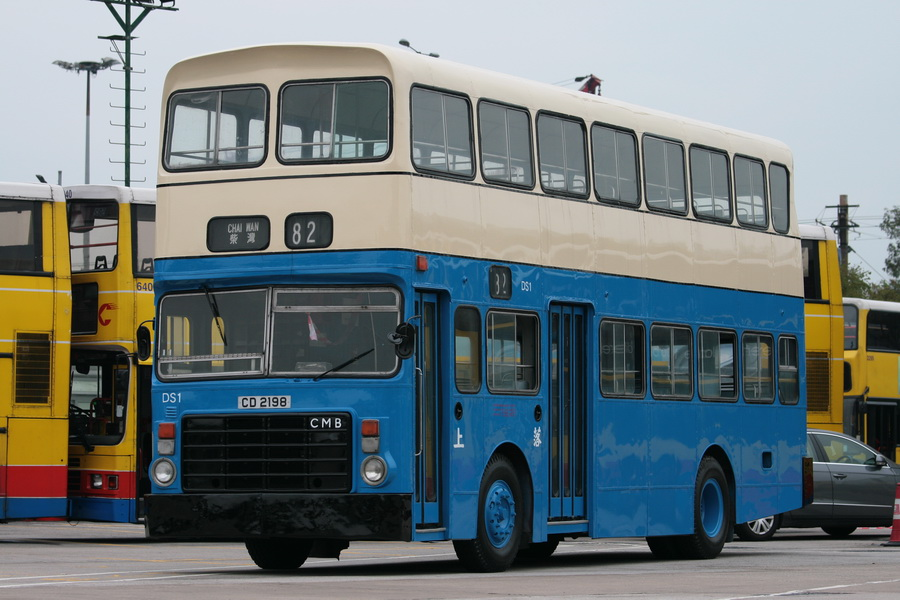
Preserved China Motor Bus Alexander bodied Dennis Jubilant

Kowloon Motor Bus (KMB) received four Dennis Jubilant prototypes for evaluation, they were fitted with KMB's own bodywork (utilising parts from British Aluminium Company) and entered service in 1977/78. After the trial of the prototypes, KMB introduced 209 Jubilants with Alexander KB bodywork between 1979 and 1981, and 150 Jubilants with Duple Metsec bodywork between 1981 and 1982.

China Motor Bus (CMB) in Hong Kong ordered 30 Dennis Jubilants with Alexander CB bodywork, they entered service in 1980.

One Jubilant chassis was delivered to Cape Town, South Africa and was fitted with bodywork supplied by Bus Bodies (South Africa) Limited.

=== Air-conditioned Jubilant ===
Kowloon Motor Bus also received one air-conditioned Jubilant coach with Alexander KB bodywork and put it into service in 1980. The air-conditioner was driven by a separate engine mounted at the rear. However, the air conditioning proved unreliable and was removed in 1983. The coach was downgraded to a bus few years later.

== Withdrawal ==
China Motor Bus wrote off one of its Dennis Jubilants after a fire in 1993. The other 29 buses were transferred to New World First Bus on 1 September 1998 after the franchise of CMB was terminated, they were replaced by new buses by September 1999.

Kowloon Motor Bus also had two of its Jubilants prematurely withdrawn, and in 1994 started to withdraw the rest. During the process of withdrawal, some of the Jubilants took over the role of the Leyland Victory Mark 2 (the competitor of Dennis Jubilant) in the fleet. The last was withdrawn in January 2000.

== See also ==
- Leyland Victory Mark 2, bus manufactured by Leyland with similar design
