= Youngman JNP6105GR =

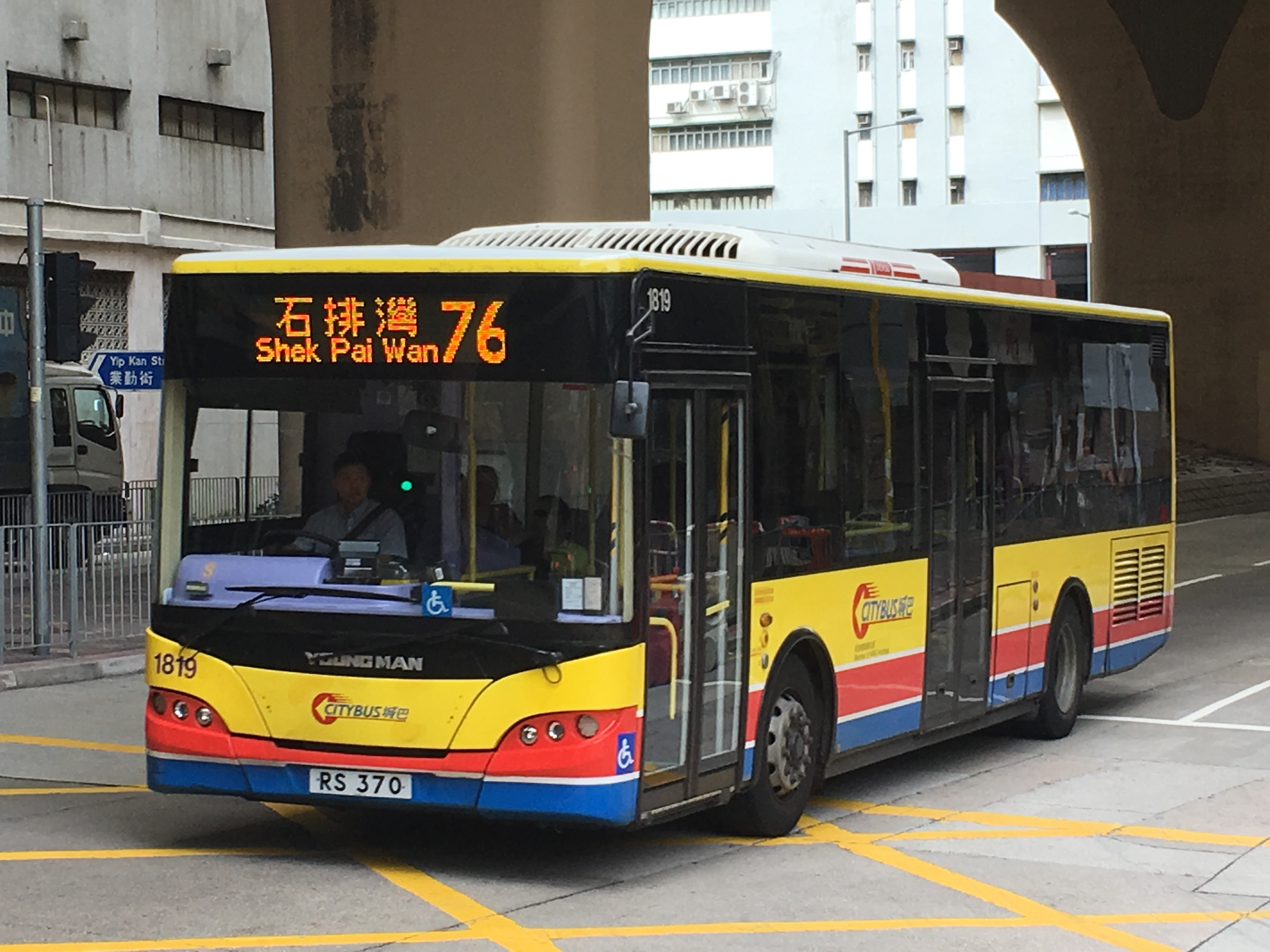
- Citybus Youngman JNP6105GR in Hong Kong

Overview
- Manufacturer: China Youngman Automobile Group Co., Ltd.
- Production: 2012–present
- Assembly: Jinhua, Zhejiang, China

Body and chassis
- Doors: 2
- Floor type: Low floor
- Related: Neoplan Centroliner; Youngman JNP6120GR; Youngman Neoplan Centroliner

Powertrain
- Engine: MAN D0836 LOH-65
- Transmission: Voith DIWA 864.5 4-speed automatic

Dimensions
- Length: 10.6m
- Width: 2.5m

Youngman JNP6105GR is a low-floor single-decker bus manufactured since 2012 by Chinese vehicle manufacturer Youngman Automobile Group Co., Ltd. in Jinhua, Zhejiang, China. It is the shorter version of the 12.0m Youngman JNP6120GR plenibus.

Many of these buses were delivered to Citybus in Hong Kong to replace the ageing Volvo B6LE.

== Launch ==
In 2011, Citybus ordered 16 JNP6105GR units in order to replace the ageing Volvo B6LE fleet. The first unit entered service on 15 August 2012 on route 76. Four of them were converted into training buses in 2020.

== Features ==
The bus interior cabin features a large display showing the next immediate stop and the three stops after it. The system is mounted on a handrail over the front offside wheel arch. This system is also installed on the lower deck of the latest Citybus Alexander Dennis Enviro500 double-deckers.

The chassis is fully Low-floor bus, removing the need for kneeling and wheelchair ramps.

The middle door, manufactured by Ventura Systems of the Netherlands, are plug door type, meaning they slide outwards instead of opening conventionally. Many newer buses in Hong Kong feature these doors.

The bus is fitted with a Euro 5 compliant MAN D0836 LOH-65 diesel engine, coupled with a Voith DIWA 864.5 4-speed automatic transmission.
