= Unitrans =

Public transit agency based in Davis, CA

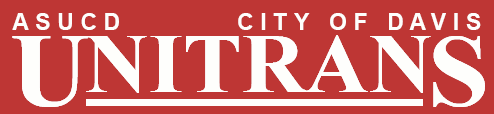

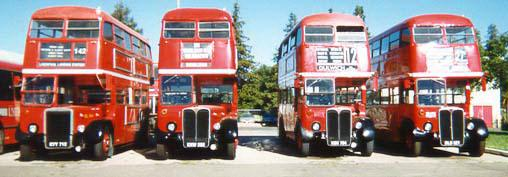
- Ex London AEC Regent III RT buses parked at the Unitrans garage.
- Parent: University of California, Davis
- Founded: 1972
- Headquarters: 1 Shields Avenue, 5 South Hall; Davis, CA 95616
- Locale: Davis, CA
- Service type: Local bus transit
- Routes: 20
- Fleet: 49
- Daily ridership: 16,200 (weekdays, Q2 2025)
- Annual ridership: 3,656,900 (2024)
- Operator: Associated Students of UC Davis (ASUCD)
- General manager: Jeff Flynn
- Website: unitrans.ucdavis.edu

Unitrans is the transit system which operates in and around the campus of the University of California, Davis. It takes its name from an abbreviation of the words "University Transport". Excepting several managerial and maintenance positions, Unitrans is managed and operated entirely by students of the University of California, Davis who usually work part-time while attending school. The system is well known throughout the area for its use of several distinctive ex-Transport for London double-decker buses, as well as its fleet of modern natural gas single-decks. The system has 18 weekday, 1 school-centered and 6 weekend routes. Current fares are $1.50 for the general public and included in student fees for undergraduate University attendees. Unitrans is one of a small number of transit systems in the United States to operate double-decker buses in regular (non-sightseeing) service. Unitrans has one of the best safety records of any public transit system in the US.

In 2024, the system had a ridership of 3,656,900, or about 16,200 per weekday as of the second quarter of 2025.

== History ==
In the late 1960s, members of the Associated Students of the University of California, Davis (ASUCD) realized the need for a transit system to transport students between the City of Davis and the university campus. In the spring of 1966, providing a transportation system became an ASUCD presidential promise. Newly elected in the fall, the President helped start experimental service in October 1966. This service was initially run using a private charter service. The estimated cost at the time was $2000/quarter. The service ran for several months, but ASUCD officials decided that the service needed to be changed. These students approached Davis' then-mayor Maynard Skinner and appealed for support both politically and financially. With the mayor's endorsement, the University Transport System, or Unitrans, began to take shape.

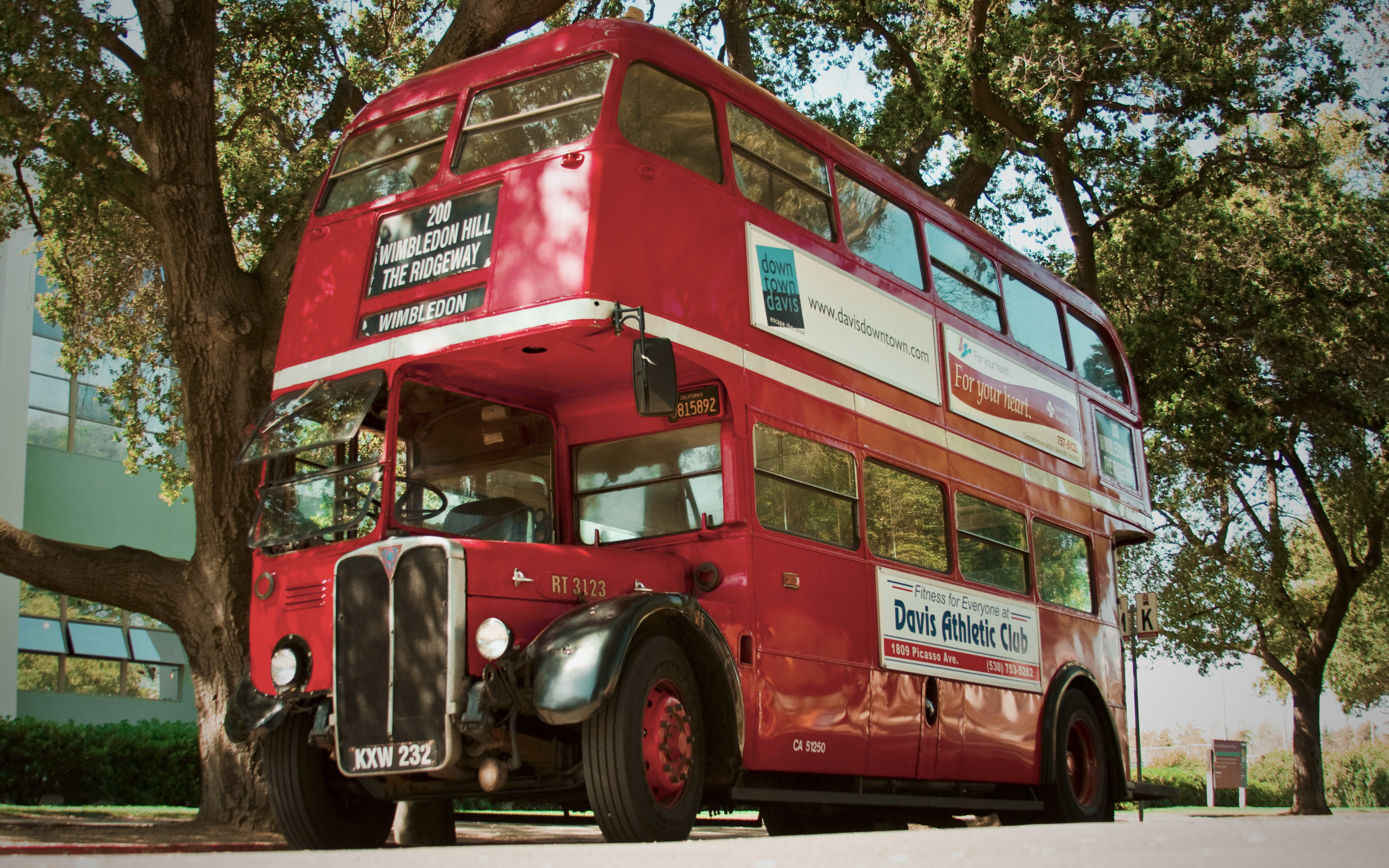
One of the ex-London double-deckers laying over at Memorial Union terminal in 2008

To be unique, get the system noticed, and encourage ridership, Unitrans made arrangements to purchase two former London Transport double-decker buses in the middle part of 1967 and use them on "East" and "West" perimeter routes in Davis. According to the March 5, 1968 edition of The California Aggie newspaper, the two RTL type double-decker buses cost $3500 each, and were shipped to San Francisco for an additional $1000. After being modified with features like clearance lights and larger left side mirrors, service began in February 1968. Upon its retirement in 2007, RTL1014 was the oldest functioning example of its type in the world still operating in revenue service on a regular basis. These first two lines operated from what is now a parking lot behind Young Hall, until 1970 when expanded service forced the terminal to move to its current location near Hickey Gym. Starting in the late 1960s, Unitrans also began supplementing its fleet with second-hand single-deck buses, starting with several General Motors "old-look" buses ranging in length from 35 to 37¾ feet.

In 1972 the service dropped its remaining full-time drivers, and started operating with a full staff of part-time student drivers. Since then Unitrans has remained a student operated organization, employing students as drivers, conductors, supervisors, driver trainers, maintenance shop assistants, bus washers and office clerks. Career positions, the only non-student positions at Unitrans, currently include General and Assistant General Manager, Maintenance Shop Manager, Maintenance Shop Mechanics, and the Safety and Training Supervisor.

Through the 1970s Unitrans added eight former London Transport RT type double-deck buses, and in the early 1980s Unitrans added two Daimler Fleetline double-deck buses that had previously operated in Yorkshire, a county in northern England. The late 1970s and early 1980s saw the addition of a 40-foot and a number of 35-foot General Motors New Look buses. In 1982 Unitrans purchases its first all new, never before used, buses when it purchased five 35-foot Gillig Phantoms from the manufacturer in Hayward, California. Two RT type double-decker buses were retired in the early 1980s, and by this time the fleet of single-deck buses outnumbered the double-deckers.

With an increasing demand for service fueled by the expanding size of the university and the City of Davis, Unitrans continued to gear up for larger passenger loads by adding more buses and more routes through the City of Davis. The mid-1980s saw the purchase of yet more previously owned single-deck buses: two more 35-foot GM "old-look" buses from the Sacramento Regional Transit District (affectionately nicknamed "Prison Buses"), another 40-foot GM New Look bus, and several more 35-foot GM New Look buses (at least one of which was also from Sacramento). In the late 1980s, the Unitrans fleet expanded again with the purchase of four 40-foot and five 35-foot Flxible New Look buses from the Sacramento Regional Transit District, and eight 35-foot GM New Look buses from the San Diego Metropolitan Transit System. Three new 30-foot Gillig Phantoms were provided by UCD's Transportation and Parking Services (TAPS) for the intracampus and UCD Medical Center shuttle to be operated by Unitrans drivers (this service is now run by the Medical Center).

An Orion V (Unitrans 4350) waiting for passengers at the Silo in 1996

Greater ridership in the 1980s prompted the writing and passing of a student referendum that added a $13 fee to registration costs to create the fare-less system. Students who paid their registration fees could ride the bus by simply showing their registration card with a valid registration sticker, or board for a cash fare of $0.50. This referendum made Unitrans an even more convenient method of transportation for students attending UC Davis.

The 1990s saw Unitrans operating 13 routes, with yearly ridership expected to top 2 million in fiscal year 1997–98. The addition of 15 brand new natural gas powered Orion Mark V buses from Oriskany, New York allowed Unitrans to modernize and clean up by retiring the Flxible fleet and portions of the GM fleet. Around the same time two 40-foot Gillig Phantoms purchased from Yolobus were reborn as Unitrans buses (and yet two more were purchased for Yolobus in 2001 and 2005).

In the late 1990s, the remainder of the GM fleet was retired, as were the two Daimlers and RTL1194, one of the first two double-deck buses purchased by Unitrans (although it hadn't operated in some time). One of the RT's that was also no longer in service by this time was ultimately sold in 2002.

In 2000 the Unitrans maintenance shop completed its retrofit of RT2819 to use a brand-new John Deere natural-gas powered engine. This bus is believed to be the only one of its type in the world to be powered by such an engine.

In 2001, Unitrans purchased 12 new natural gas powered Blue Bird Xcel 102 buses. Working with the University of California, Davis' Institute of Transportation Studies, one of the Blue Birds was slated to operate on a Hydrogen/CNG fuel blend, and was retired from service to begin work on the conversion. This bus was eventually introduced on April 20, 2004, when California Governor Arnold Schwarzenegger made a visit to the campus as part of a push for the Hydrogen highway project.

2003 saw the addition of five new Mark VII 40-foot buses from Orion. These buses were purchased in coordination with Sacramento Regional Transit, and featured a low floor design, intended to make loading wheelchairs easier on the driver and the passengers.

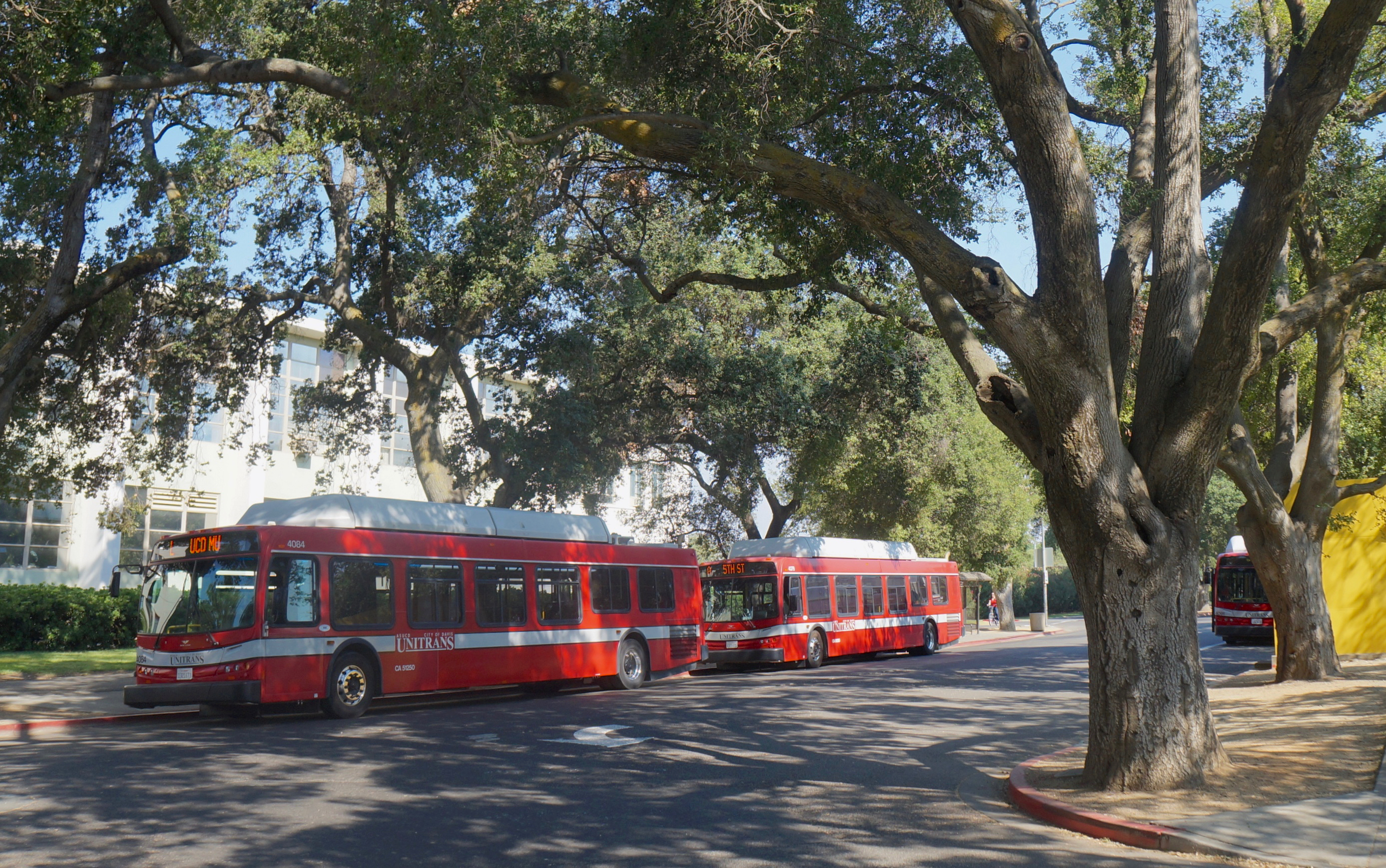
New Flyer-built low-floor, compressed-natural-gas buses, in 2013

In 2006–2007, Unitrans added eight new Orion Mark V 40-foot buses (4171-4178) to its fleet, returning to the high-floor design. This decision was made due to lower prices, fleet standardization, and availability of buses.

On May 12, 2008, construction began on the new Unitrans Silo Terminal. The terminal was completed in late September 2008. A dedication ceremony took place on October 30, 2008, and was attended by several local dignitaries. October 30, 2008 also marked the 50 millionth rider of the transit system.

Unitrans received six new low-floor buses from New Flyer at the beginning of Summer 2009, and received 12 more in 2010. These new buses will replace most of the aging Orion V buses, due to the upcoming end of their fuel cylinder lifespans. Unitrans received delivery of two Alexander Dennis Enviro500 40' double-deck buses in March 2010.

In 2019, Unitrans started the transition to battery electric buses. Six New Flyer Xcelsior CHARGE buses were purchased, supported by Federal Transit Administration grants. Unitrans plans to fully transition away from CNG buses to battery electric buses by 2023. The first six New Flyer Xcelsior CHARGE buses went into service in Fall 2022.

== Future ==
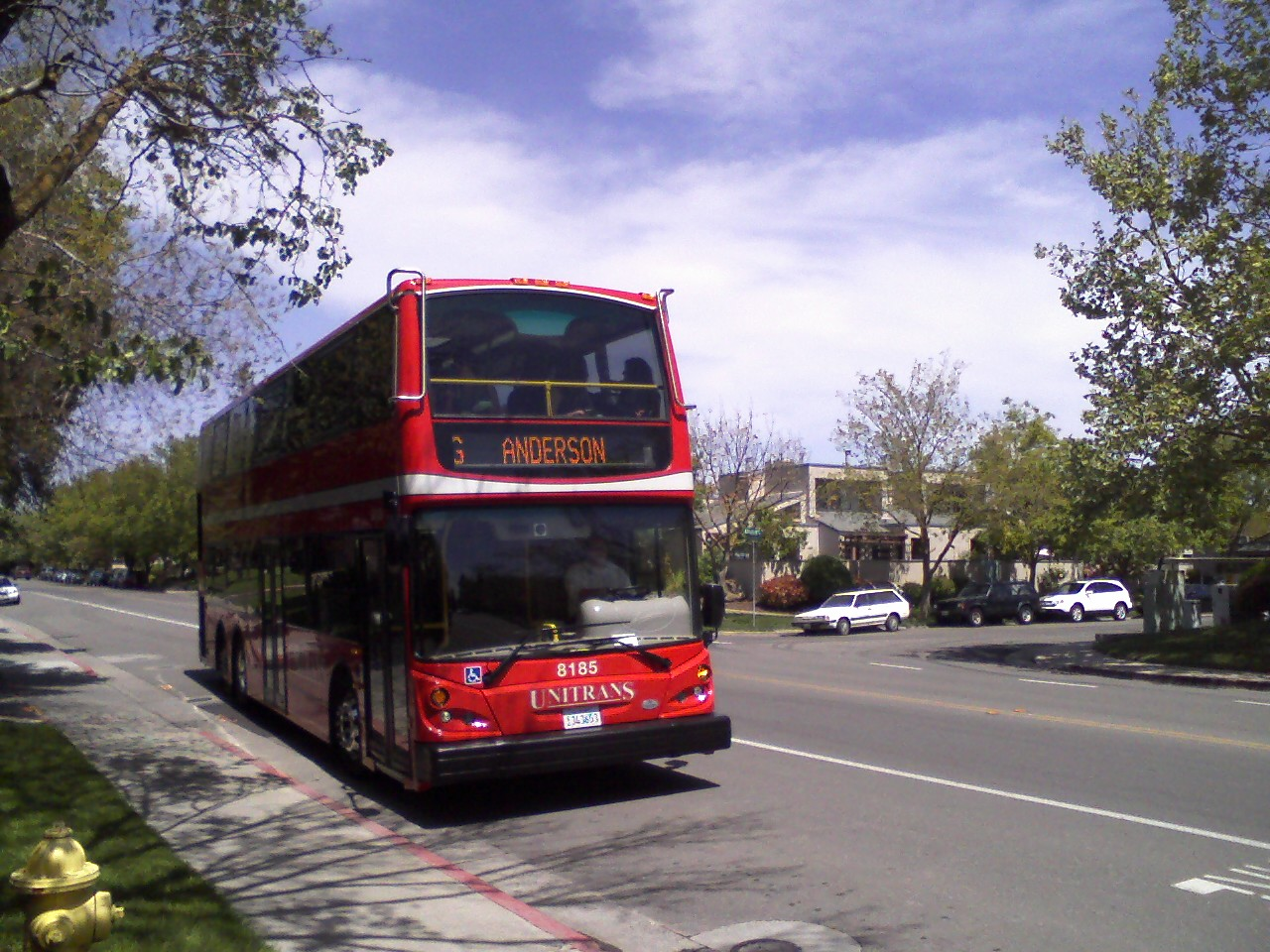
Unitrans 8185

Unitrans has moved towards an almost-entirely alternative fuel fleet. With the exception of the vintage double-deck buses and two rarely used support vans, the fleet is powered entirely by compressed natural gas. All diesel single-deck buses have been retired from service and have been sold. The Unitrans fleet is currently powered by nearly 95% alternative fuel.

Unitrans received delivery in March 2010 of two Alexander Dennis Enviro500 buses, in an attempt to accommodate the high passenger loads while reducing the demand on drivers. These buses are powered by clean diesel engines, which produce the same levels of emissions as the compressed natural gas, which powers the modern fleet. These two buses are not intended to replace the antique double-deck buses, but to complement them and accommodate the high passenger loads that Unitrans experiences on a daily basis.

Unitrans has added six New Flyer C40LFR low-floor buses to the fleet, and had 12 more delivered in 2010. The aging 1996 Orion V 35' fleet was retired, as well as four of the remaining 40' Orion V buses.

Unitrans purchased three New Flyer Xcelsior low-floor buses in 2014, and they were put into service in July 2014.
