= MAN 24.3x0 =

Low-floor 3-axle double-decker bus chassis built for right-hand drive markets

MAN 24.3x0 HOCLNR-NL
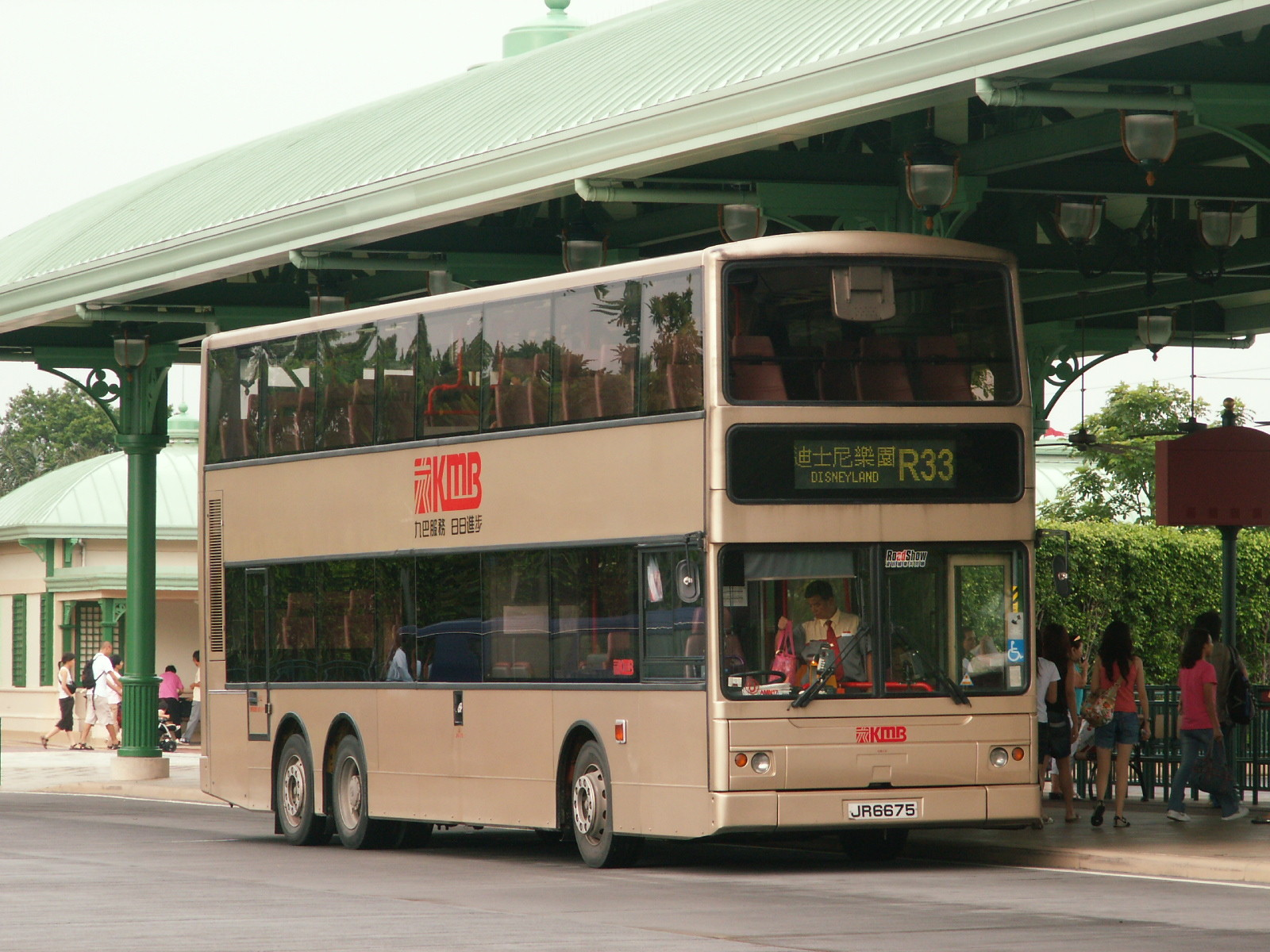
- A Kowloon Motor Bus MAN 24.310 with Berkhof bodywork.

Overview
- Manufacturer: MAN

Body and chassis
- Doors: 2 doors
- Floor type: Low floor

Powertrain
- Engine: MAN D2866LOH25; MAN D2866LOH26; MAN D2866LOH27
- Transmission: ZF 5HP590; ZF 5HP600(24.350)

Dimensions
- Length: 12,000 mm (39 ft 4 1/2 in)
- Width: 2,500 mm (8 ft 2 3/8 in)

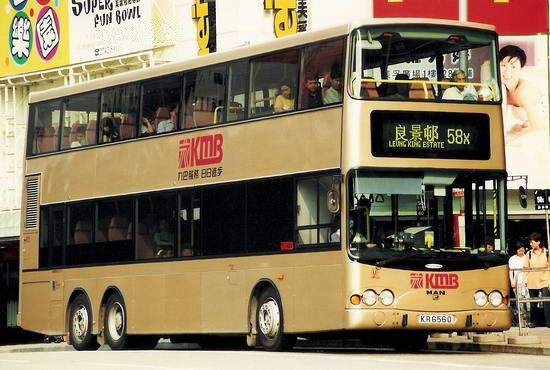
KMB's MAN 24.310 with Volgren bodywork.

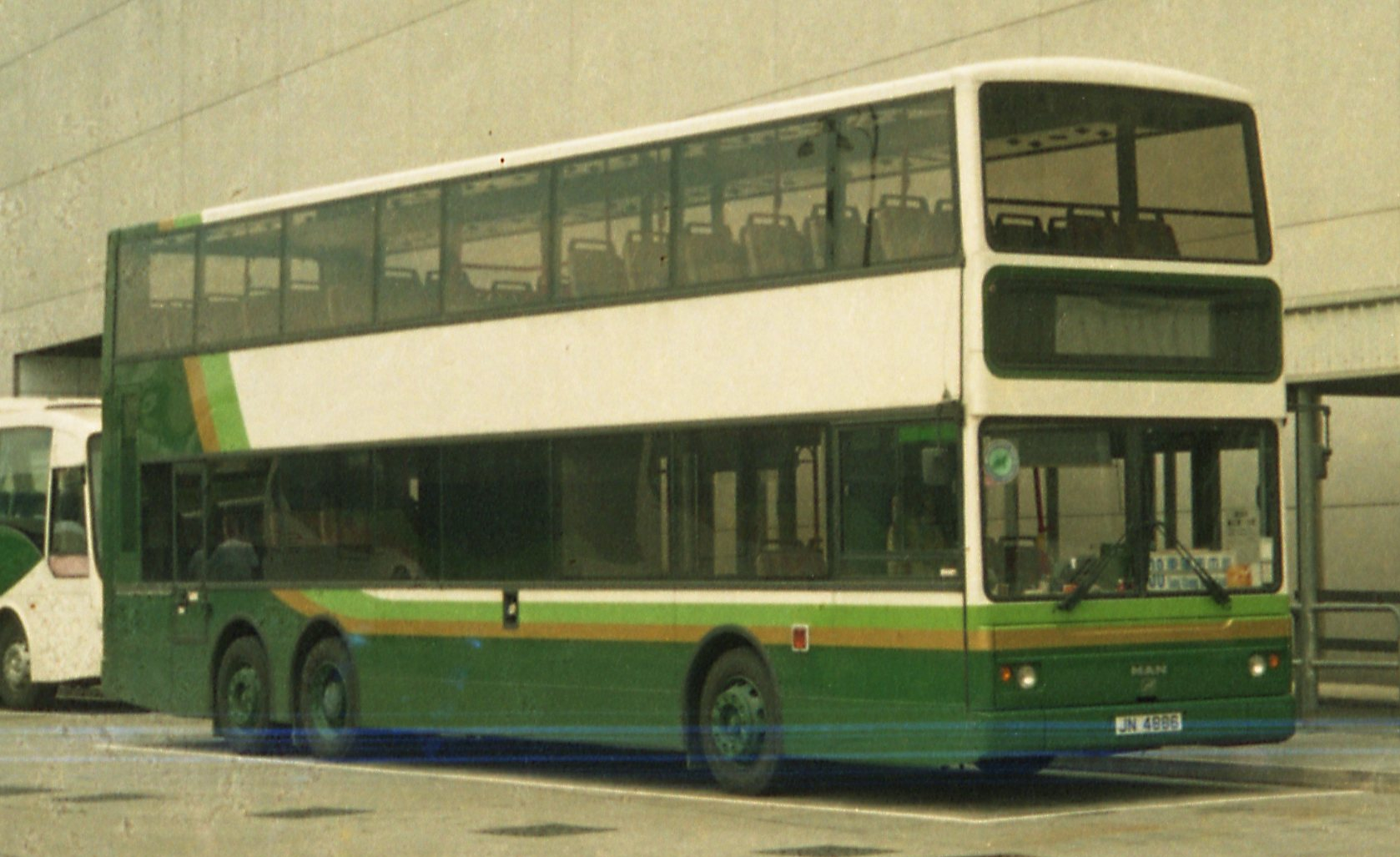
Kwoon Chung's MAN 24.310 with Berkhof bodywork.

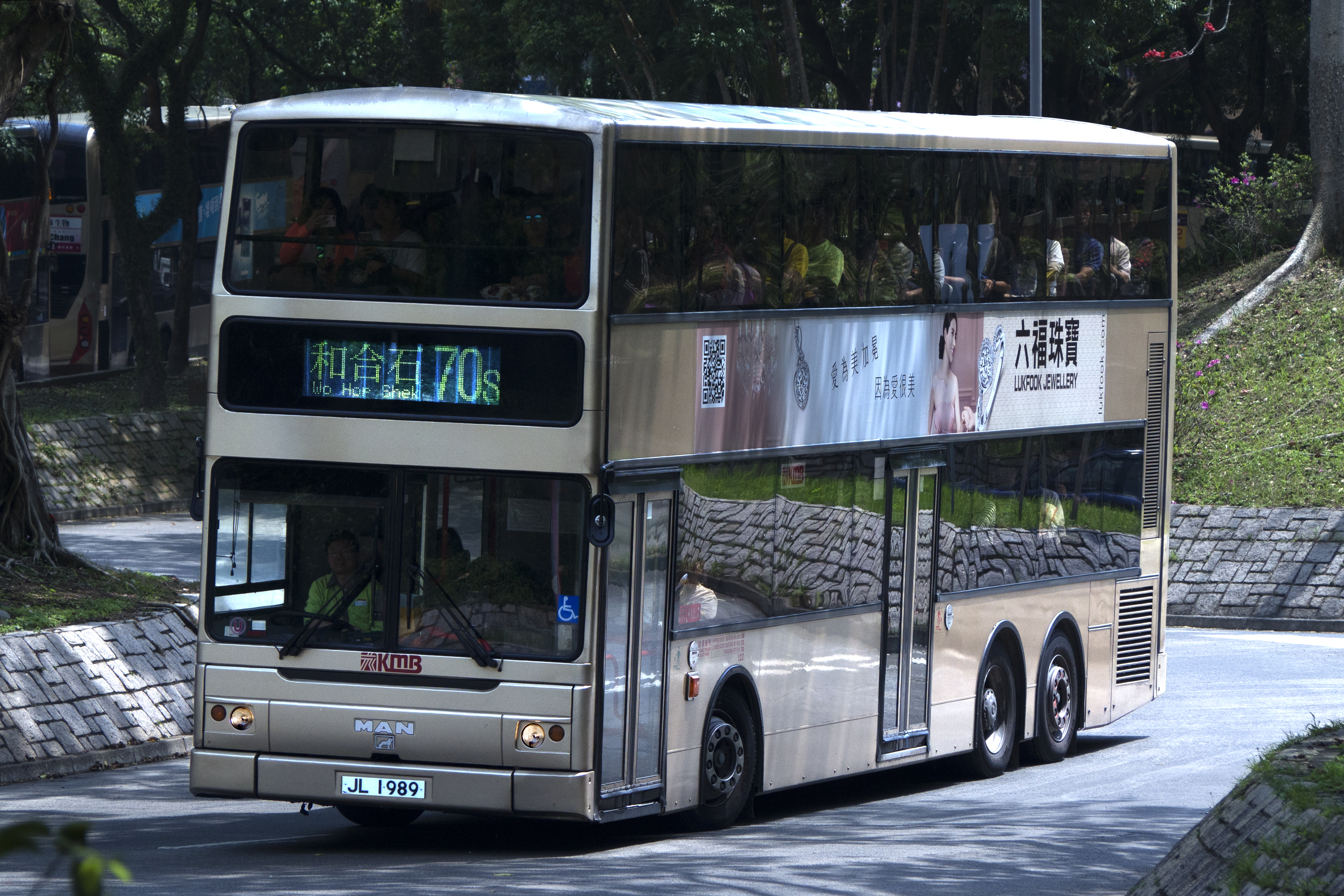
KMB's MAN 24.310 seen on route 70S

The MAN 24.3x0 HOCLNR-NL was a series of low-floor 3-axle double-decker bus chassis built for right-hand drive markets, as indicated by the R in the designation. It was designed by MAN Truck & Bus, a subsidiary of Triton based on Munich. Unlike other low-entry double-decker buses in Hong Kong, there are steps in the lower deck aisle after the rear exit.

The 24.3x0 was available as both the 24.310 and 24.350, with internal codes MAN A59 and MAN A57 respectively. For the type designation 24.310, 24 means that the bus has the maximum gross weight of 24 tonnes (23.6 long tons; 26.5 short tons), whilst 310 means that the maximum power of the engine is 310 hp (231 kW); for 24.350, the 350 means that the maximum power of the engine is 350 hp (261 kW).

== Hong Kong ==
=== Citybus ===
In December 1997, Citybus introduced a solitary Australian-built MAN 24.350 bus with Volgren CR221LD bodywork. This bus remained unique in Citybus fleet and was withdrawn in 2015 due to engine failure and lack of spare parts.

==== Cancelled order ====
In 1998, Citybus ordered a number of MAN 24.310 buses with Berkhof/Volgren CR223LD bodywork after the trial of its MAN 24.350. However, in early 1999, Transport Department of Hong Kong set quota on the number of buses owned by Citybus, and therefore the order was cancelled involuntarily.

At that time, construction of 32 Berkhof-bodied buses and 2 Volgren CR223LD-bodied buses had been completed, so MAN had to find buyers for these buses. Finally, one Berkhof-bodied bus was retained by MAN for testing, and the others were sold for operations in Hong Kong.

=== Kwoon Chung Motors ===
In 1999, Kwoon Chung Motors, a coach and rental bus operator in Hong Kong, took one of the Berkhof-bodied MAN 24.310 that had been built for Citybus and the bus entered service in 2000.

The bus was primarily used on worker services (for staff working at some of the companies at the Hong Kong International Airport). But during rush hours, it could be seen allocated to New Lantao Bus, (a subsidiary of Kwoon Chung), routes in Tung Chung.

This bus was retired and stored in July 2015.

=== Kowloon Motor Bus ===
Kowloon Motor Bus took delivery of the other 32 MAN 24.310 buses from the Citybus order. The 30 buses with Berkhof bodywork entered service in 2000. The 2 buses with Volgren CR223LD bodywork, which had been stored in Volgren's facility at Perth, Australia, entered service in 2002.

Later, KMB ordered 15 MAN 24.310 buses with Volgren CR223LD bodywork. They had the staircase moved forward, had yellow instead of red handrails and no seats were fitted above the front wheels. They entered service in 2002.

All of these 47 buses were allocated to Tuen Mun Depot and mainly ran on express routes serving Tuen Mun, Tsuen Wan, Kwai Tsing Districts and Kowloon.

The buses have reached 16 to 18 years of age in 2018, KMB has withdrawn all of the buses from service.

== United Kingdom ==
Stagecoach Group introduced 28 MAN 24.350 intercity coaches with Jonckheere Monaco bodywork in 1999/2000 for its Oxford Tube service. They were superseded by new Neoplan Skyliner intercity coaches in 2004.

== See also ==
List of buses

Competitors:
- Dennis Trident 3
- Neoplan Centroliner
- Scania K94UB
- Volvo Super Olympian
