= Neoplan Centroliner =

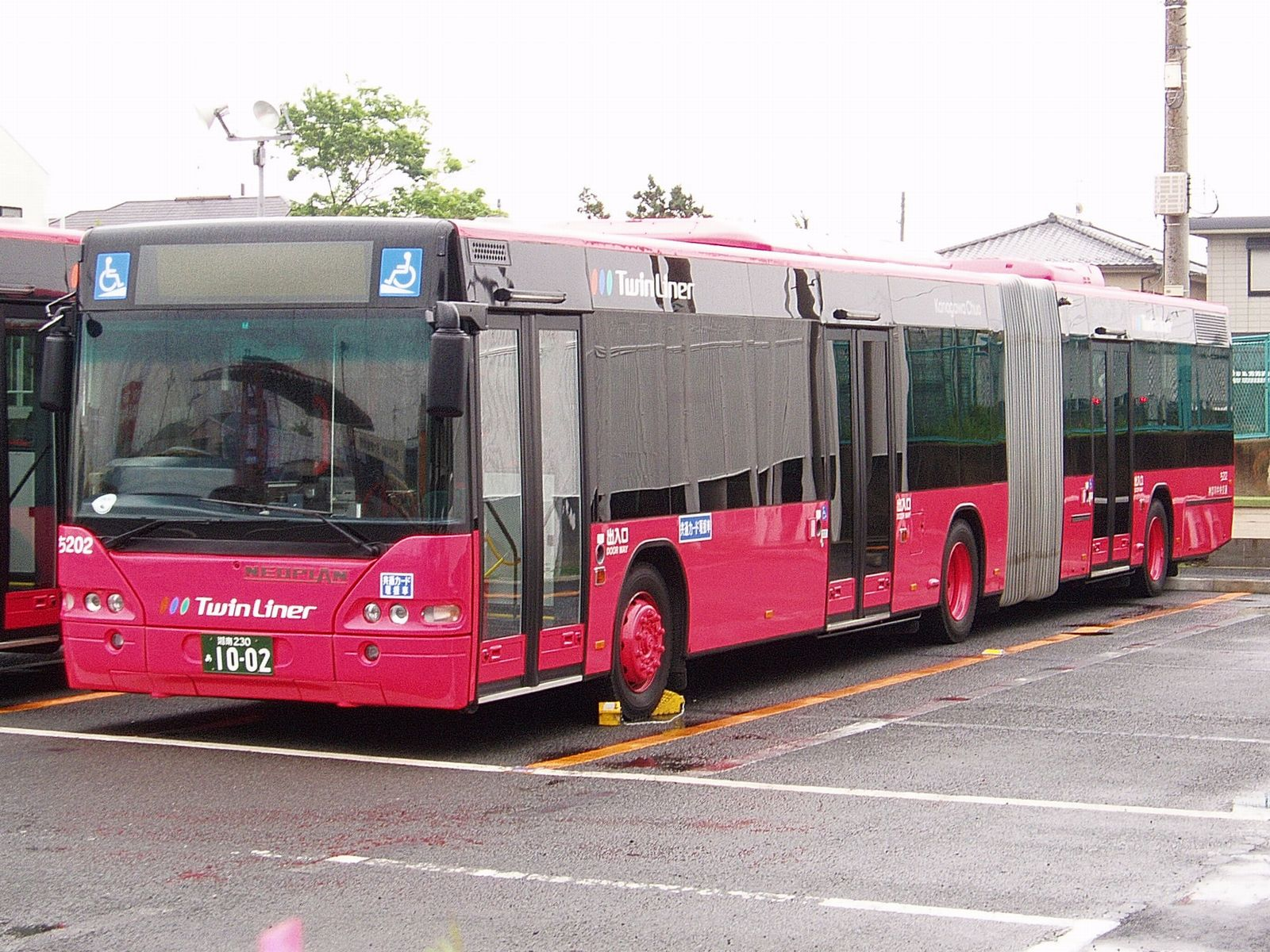

Overview
- Manufacturer: Neoplan Bus GmbH
- Also called: Neoplan Centroliner Evolution
- Production: 1997–2009
- Assembly: Stuttgart, Germany; Plauen, Saxony, Germany; Pilsting, Germany

Body and chassis
- Class: Commercial vehicle
- Body style: Midibus, single-decker city bus, single-decker articulated bus, double-decker multi-axle bus
- Layout: Rear-engine design
- Doors: 1 door, 2 doors or 3 doors (rigid); 2 doors, 3 doors or 4 doors (articulated)
- Floor type: Low floor
- Related: Youngman JNP6105GR

Powertrain
- Engine: 10.5 L MAN D2066 LUH CR turbodiesel Cummins M11 305E
- Transmission: 4-speed VOITH Diwa automatic, 6-speed ZF Ecomat automatic

Dimensions
- Wheelbase: 5,875 mm (231.3 in)
- Width: 2.50 m (8 ft 2 in)
- Height: 2.88 m (9 ft 5 in)

Chronology
- Predecessor: Neoplan Metroliner family (N4016)
- Successor: MAN Lion's City

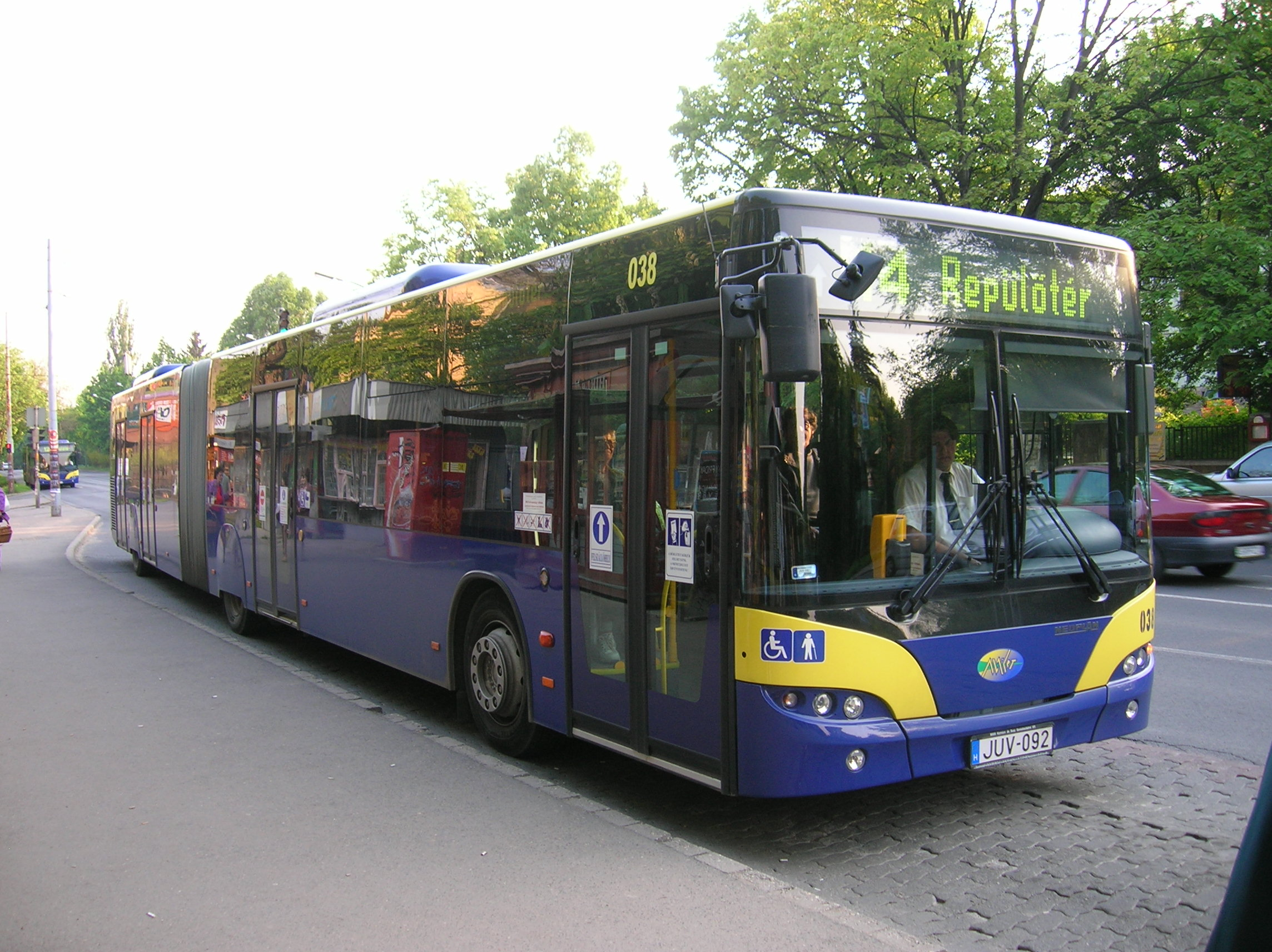
Neoplan Centroliner Evolution articulated bus in Miskolc (Hungary)

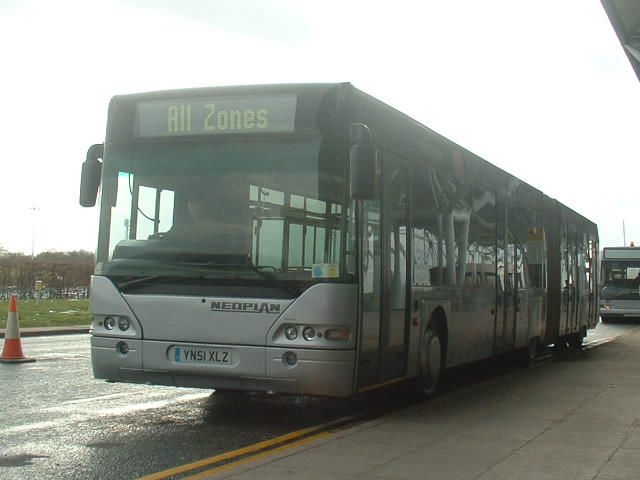
A right hand drive first generation Neoplan Centroliner as a shuttle bus at London Stansted Airport

The Neoplan Centroliner is a series of low-floor transit buses which was first unveiled in 1997, and mainly built by Neoplan Bus GmbH for the European market. At the time when it was first released, it adopted contemporary technologies like Controller Area Network.

The product range of Centroliner included: midibus, full-size/articulated single-decker, and three-axle double-decker, in different body lengths. The rigids had 1 door, 2 door or 3 doors whereas the articulated have 2 doors, 3 doors or 4 doors. After the acquisition of Neoplan by MAN AG subsidy MAN Nutzfahrzeuge AG, a new version of Centroliner full-size/articulated single-decker was launched, it was also known as Neoplan Centroliner Evolution and was based on MAN Lion's City with different bodywork. After restructuring of MAN's bus division in 2009, Neoplan is concentrating exclusively on luxury coaches and due to that, Centroliner was discontinued without Neoplan-branded successor. Instead, MAN promotes Lion's City as its successor. Despite the discontinuation of the Centroliner in 2009, MAN delivered 41 MAN Lions City to Arriva Denmark in 2017, with the complete front design of the Neoplan Centroliner, for use on a high-priority bus line in Copenhagen, Denmark.

== Specifications (2009) ==
The Neoplan Centroliner is available in a range of styles and dimensions. As of 2009, the Centroliner consists of the following specifications and powertrain detail.

Model	internal combustion engine	Max. power @ rpm	Max. torque @ rpm	Transmission	Wheelbase	Length	Width	Height	Passengers Seats/Standing
Centroliner N4516 (single-deck 2-axle)	MAN D2066 LUH; 10,520 cc (642.0 cu in) R6 common rail turbodiesel	199 or 228 kW (271 or 310 PS; 267 or 306 bhp) @ 1,900 or 1,700 – Euro4 235 or 265 kW (320 or 360 PS; 315 or 355 bhp) @ 1,900 – EEV	1,250 or 1,550 N⋅m (922 or 1,143 lbf⋅ft) @ 1,000–1,400 1,600 or 1,800 N⋅m (1,180 or 1,328 lbf⋅ft) @ 1,000–1,400	4-speed automatic 6-speed ZF automatic	5,875 mm (231.3 in)	11.95 m (39 ft 2 in)	2.50 m (8 ft 2 in)	2.99 m (9 ft 10 in)	36+1 / 56
Centroliner N4516P (single-deck 2-axle)	MAN D2066 LUH; 10,520 cc (642.0 cu in) R6 common rail turbodiesel	199 or 228 kW (271 or 310 PS; 267 or 306 bhp) @ 1,900 or 1,700 – Euro4 235 or 265 kW (320 or 360 PS; 315 or 355 bhp) @ 1,900 – EEV	1,250 or 1,550 N⋅m (922 or 1,143 lbf⋅ft) @ 1,000–1,400 1,600 or 1,800 N⋅m (1,180 or 1,328 lbf⋅ft) @ 1,000–1,400	4-speed automatic 6-speed ZF automatic	5,875 mm (231.3 in)	11.95 m (39 ft 2 in)	2.50 m (8 ft 2 in)	2.99 m (9 ft 10 in)	44+1 / 48
Centroliner N4522 (articulated 3-axle)	MAN D2066 LUH; 10,520 cc (642.0 cu in) R6 common rail turbodiesel	228 or 257 kW (310 or 349 PS; 306 or 345 bhp) @ 1,700 – Euro4 235 or 265 kW (320 or 360 PS; 315 or 355 bhp) @ 1,900 – EEV	1,550 or 1,750 N⋅m (1,143 or 1,291 lbf⋅ft) @ 1,000–1,400 1,600 or 1,800 N⋅m (1,180 or 1,328 lbf⋅ft) @ 1,000–1,400	4-speed automatic 6-speed ZF automatic	5,875 and 5,055 mm (231.3 and 199.0 in)	18.72 m (61 ft 5 in)	2.50 m (8 ft 2 in)	2.99 m (9 ft 10 in)	56+1 / 108

== Hong Kong ==
The Neoplan Centroliner was the third type of German double-decker introduced in Hong Kong (the first being the Mercedes-Benz O305, and the second the MAN 24.350 HOCLNR-NL). A total of 193 Neoplan Centroliner double-deckers were introduced to Hong Kong by Kowloon Motor Bus (KMB) and New World First Bus (NWFB).

=== Kowloon Motor Bus ===
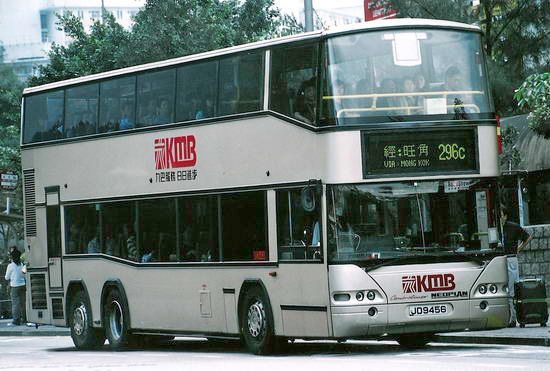
KMB Centroliner operating route 296C

KMB received their first Neoplan Centroliner in September 1998, after the test-drive of the 15 metres (49 ft) Neoplan Megashuttle in 1997. A total of 20 Centroliner N4026/3s (fleet number AP1-AP20), powered with Euro II compliant Cummins M11-305E21 10.8 litres (659.1 cu in) straight six diesel engine and ZF Ecomat 5HP590 five-speed automatic transmission, entered service in August 1999.

In 2000, KMB received 60 Centroliner N4426/3s, followed by 50 similar buses in 2000/2001. They (AP21-AP130) were allocated to long-distance routes serving North/Yuen Long/Tuen Mun Districts.

In April 2001, KMB acquired two Centroliner N4426/3s (AP131-AP132) which were fitted with MAN D2866 LOH-27 straight six common rail Euro III turbodiesel engines, and either a four-speed Voith DIWA864.3E or five-speed ZF Ecomat 5HP602C transmissions. They were coated with special metallic 'flip' paint, which shows different colours (mainly green and purple), depending on the angle of light reflection. They entered service in August 2001. One of them (AP131) was repainted in the standard KMB champagne gold livery in 2010.

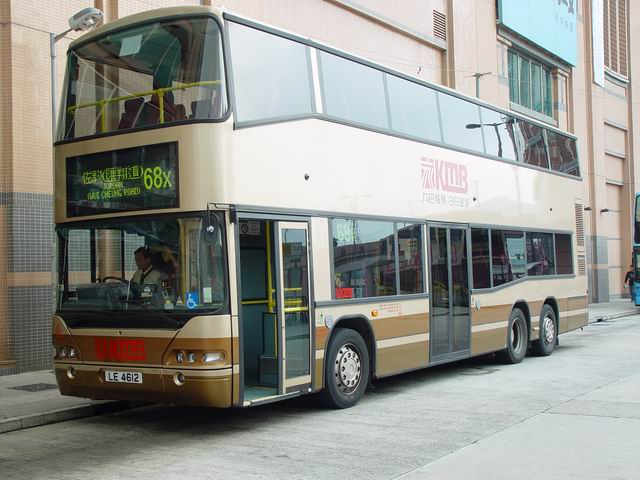
A KMB Centroliner (APM1, second generation)

In 2002, KMB acquired a further 30 Centroliner N4426/3s (AP133-AP162) with MAN Euro III engines. Two of them (fleet number AP144, AP159) are the world's first two transit buses to be equipped with six-speed automatic transmission. The transmission is a modified ZF Ecomat 6HP602C. They were the test buses of Eco-driveline (with large differential gear ratio, engine with high low-end torque and six-speed automatic gearbox).

Withdrawal of the first batch of Neoplan Centroliners started in 2016. The last were retired in 2018.

In May 2003, KMB received a NEOMAN Centroliner N4426/3 (APM1) with MAN ND313F chassis and straight staircase. The width of the bus has increased from 2.50 metres (98.4 in) to 2.55 metres (100.4 in), and is equipped with MAN D2866 LUH-24 straight six engine, four-speed Voith DIWA864.3E transmission, and ventilated disc brakes on all wheels. The bus was painted in gold with dark brown skirt, which is the standard livery for other straight-staircase low-floor buses such as TransBus Enviro500 and Wright-bodied Volvo Super Olympian. It was registered in October 2003. It has been criticised for its frequent breakdowns and extra difficulty in maintenance and so it has remained as a reserve bus since it entered service. This bus remained unique in KMB fleet and was retired on 16 January 2019.

=== New World First Bus ===
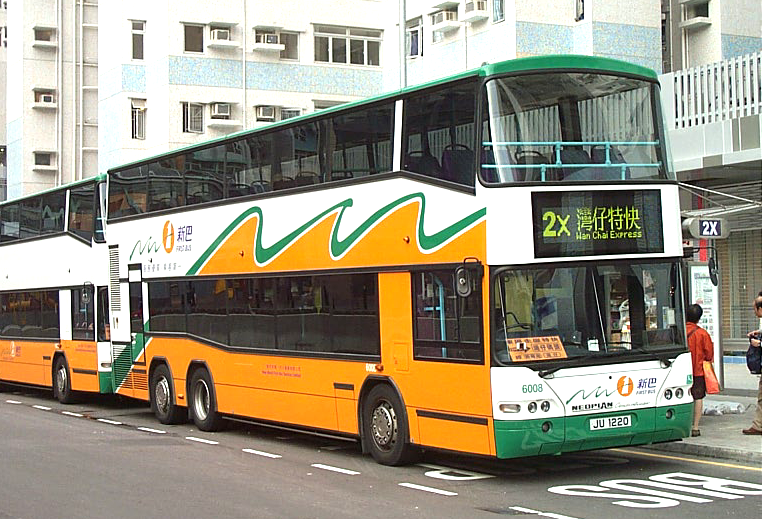
A Centroliner of New World First Bus with the standard wavy livery of the company

After KMB put its first 20 Centroliners into service, NWFB announced the order of 30 Neoplan Centroliner N4426/3s in October 1999. They were delivered in 2000 and entered service in 2000/2001.

Since 2004, a number of these buses have been suspended from service. Some believe that it is caused by the difficulty in maintenance by NWFB, or due to the fleet quota limit set by the Transport Department of Hong Kong. However, the actual reason is not clearly known. All of them have been put back into the fleet.

The last Neoplan Centroliner in NWFB (Fleet numbers 6024, 6027, 6030) was retired in February 2019, indicating that there are no more Neoplan Centroliners in franchised service.

=== Sun Bus ===
Sun Bus acquired two Neoplan Centroliners (formerly AP144, 146) from Kowloon Motor Bus, so that they could provide high capacity non-franchised private hire vehicles.

They first appeared as a shuttle for tourists from the Kai Tak Cruise Terminal in a KMB gold livery with no logo.

In December 2019, former AP146 toppled to its side on the roof of KMB's Lai Chi Kok depot. The bus was repaired and was put back into service two months later. The bus later retired in mid-2020.

=== July 2003 Tuen Mun Road bus accident ===
A Kowloon Motor Bus Centroliner (fleet number AP69) was forced off a viaduct by a lorry on Tuen Mun Road on 10 July 2003 and was subsequently written off. The remains of the bus were then sent to Long Win Bus's depot in Siu Ho Wan for inspection and storage. The remains were finally sold for scrap in 2008.

In total, 21 people (20 passengers and a bus driver) were killed in this accident, making this the deadliest road accident in Hong Kong history. The lorry driver involved was sentenced to 18 months in prison after being found guilty of causing death by dangerous driving. He later appealed against the rulings, which were subsequently overturned. He was then found guilty of careless driving, and his sentence was shortened to six months.

== See also ==
- Youngman JNP6105GR
