= Alexander Dennis Enviro500 =

Three-axle double decker bus

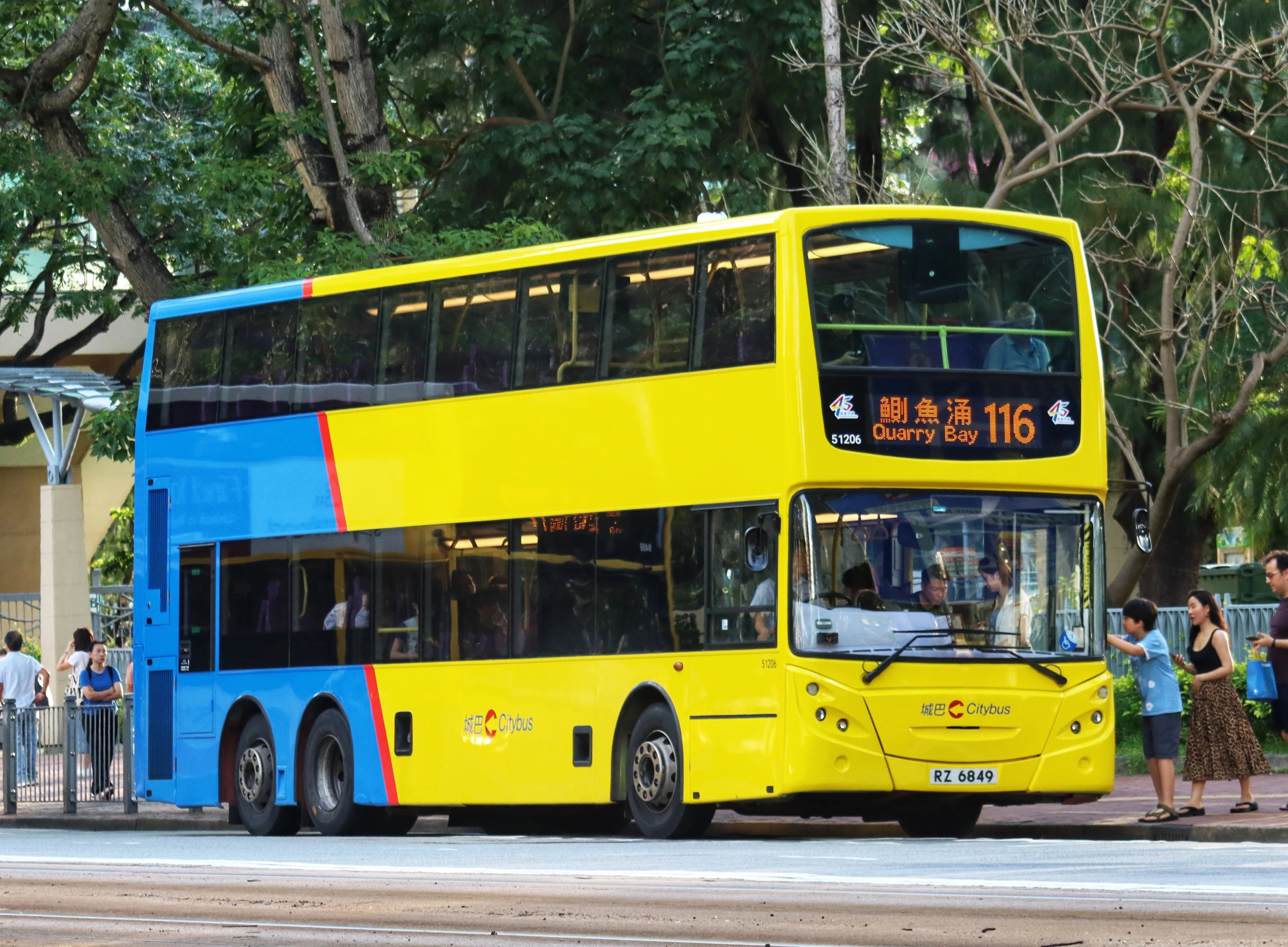
- Citybus Enviro500 in Hong Kong in July 2024

Overview
- Manufacturer: TransBus International/Alexander Dennis
- Production: 2002–2014
- Assembly: Chassis: Guildford, England; Bodywork: Falkirk, Scotland

Body and chassis
- Doors: 1 or 2 doors
- Floor type: Low floor
- Chassis: Alexander Dennis Enviro500 (a.k.a. Trident E500); 3-axle Volvo B9TL
- Related: Alexander Dennis Enviro400

Powertrain
- Engine: Cummins ISMe/ISM/ISLe/ISL (ADL Enviro500); Volvo D9A/D9B (3-axle Volvo B9TL)
- Power output: Cummins: 330hp/335hp/340hp/380hp Volvo: 300hp/310hp/340hp
- Transmission: Voith DIWA; ZF Ecomat; Allison B500R

Dimensions
- Length: 11.3 m (37 ft 1 in), 12 m (39 ft 4 in) and 12.8 m (42 ft 0 in)
- Width: 2.55 m (8 ft 4 in)
- Height: 4.1 m (13 ft 5 in), 4.2 m (13 ft 9 in), and 4.4 m (14 ft 5 in)

Chronology
- Predecessor: Alexander ALX500; Dennis Trident 3
- Successor: Alexander Dennis Enviro500 MMC

The Alexander Dennis Enviro500 (previously known as the TransBus Enviro500) is a three-axle double-decker bus built by Alexander Dennis (formerly by TransBus International) in the United Kingdom. It was unveiled in 2002 and is one of the Enviro-series bus models made by TransBus/Alexander Dennis. The bus was sold on diesel or hybrid-electric powertrains and on Volvo chassis as a bodywork.

In 2014, the Enviro500 was superseded by the new Alexander Dennis Enviro500 MMC.

== Design ==
The Dennis chassis for the Enviro500 (also known as the Trident E500) was modified from the Trident 3. It can be fitted with Cummins ISMe335 Euro 3 engine (later Cummins ISLe340 Euro 4/Euro 5 engine which uses AdBlue to reduce emission of nitrogen oxides through selective catalytic reduction process), or ISM-330 engine for the buses delivered to North America, and coupled to Voith DIWA 864.3 4-speed or ZF Ecomat 5HP 602 5-speed gearboxes. Later Voith DIWA 864.5 4-speed gearbox, ZF Ecomat 6HP 602C 6-speed gearbox and Allison B500R 6-speed gearbox became available and gradually became the standard configurations.

Initially only the 12-metre (39 ft 4 1/2 in) version of the Enviro500 was built, but in 2007 Alexander Dennis announced the production of the 12.8-metre-long (41 ft 11 7/8 in) version, and an 11.3-metre (37 ft 1 in) variant followed in 2008.

Later Alexander Dennis developed the hybrid electric version of Enviro500, known as the Enviro500H, with Allison's parallel hybrid drive system; it was unveiled in late 2008.

The body of the Enviro500 was based on the original style of the single-deck Enviro300, and the upper-deck frontal design was similar to the design used on the Plaxton President body.

== Orders ==
=== Asia ===
==== Hong Kong ====
The vehicle exceeded some design limitations in Hong Kong, the first city where the model was used, prompting the local Transport Department to make some exclusions in order to make the buses available to KMB on time.

- The width of the bus is 2.55 metres (8 ft 4 3/8 in) exceeding the limit of 2.5 metres (8 ft 2 3/8 in). The width of 2.55 metres (8 ft 4 3/8 in) was approved by the European Union, becoming the current standard.
- A fixed glass replaced the emergency door at the rear of the upper deck, but with more hammers available for emergency.
- The front indicators are the smallest of all current models of Kowloon Motor Bus.

The facelifted version of the Enviro500 body, first built in late 2003, have revised frontal and rear designs. This version of Enviro500 bodywork was also available with Volvo B9TL chassis.

===== Kowloon Motor Bus =====
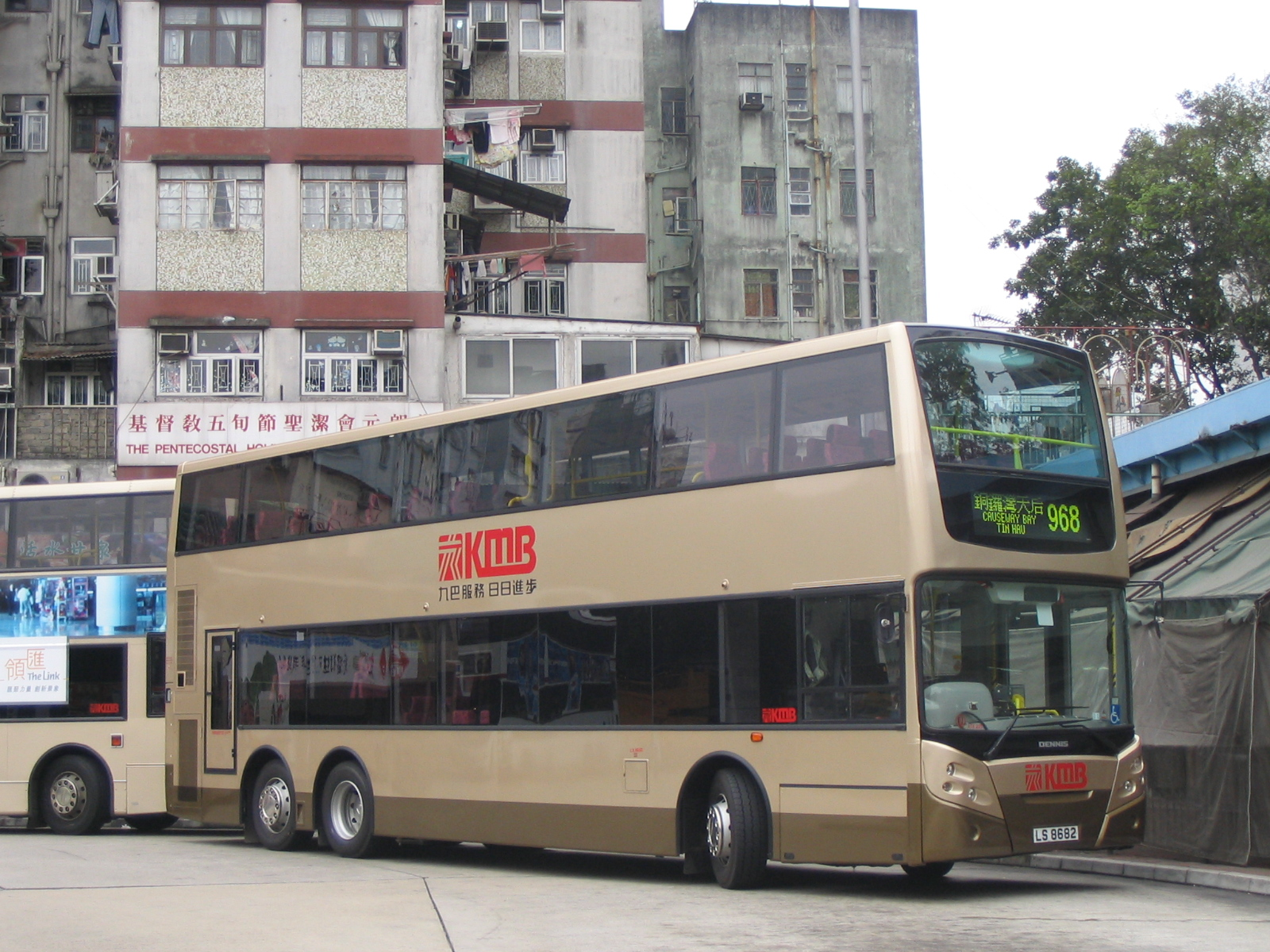
Kowloon Motor Bus Mk1 Enviro500 in 2004

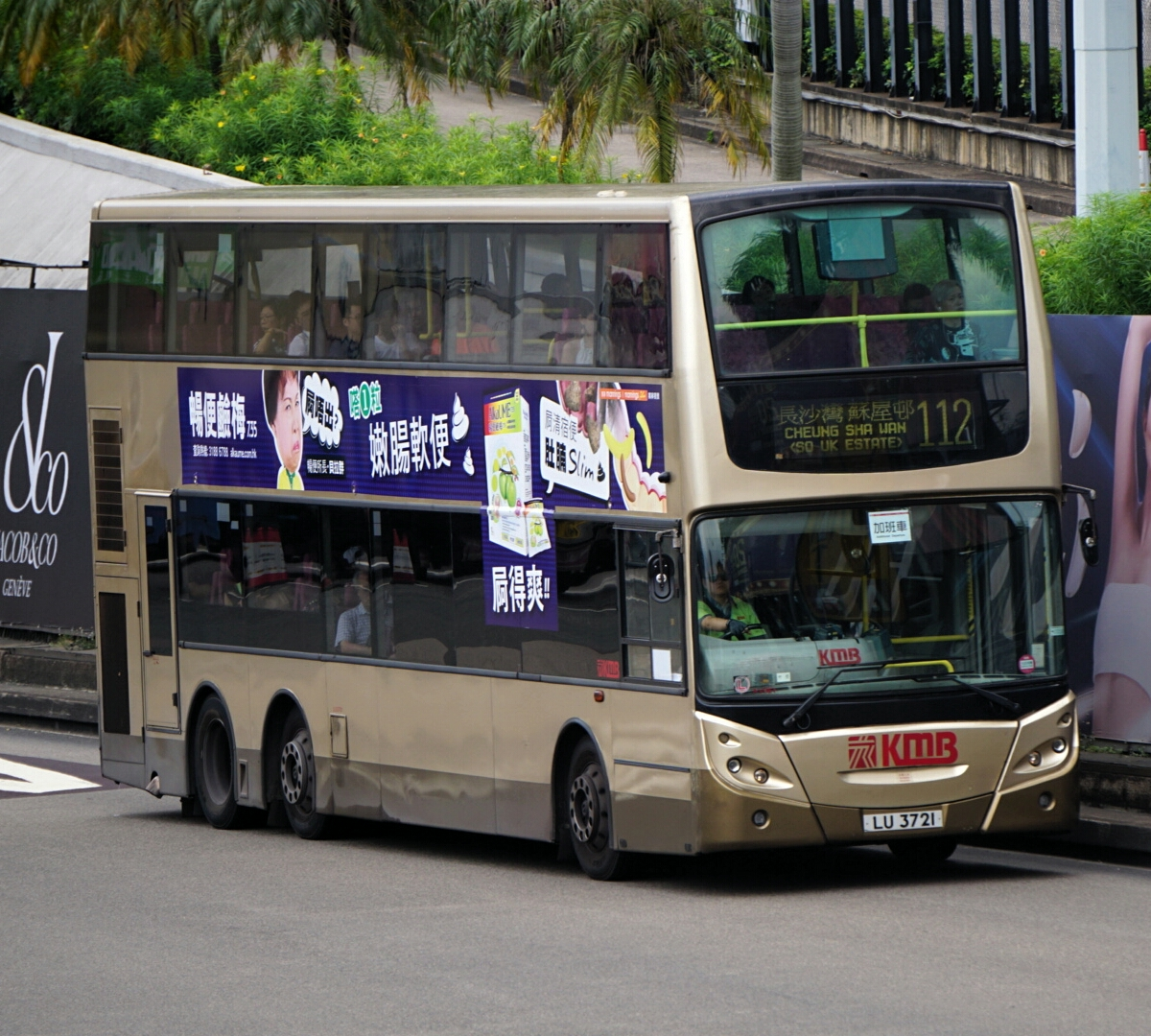
Kowloon Motor Bus Enviro500 bodied Volvo B9TL in 2019

The Enviro500 is the first model of second-generation low-floor buses for Kowloon Motor Bus, with straight staircase and plug door (only at the exit) fitted. All KMB's Enviro500s had a bronze band added to the champagne livery to differentiate them from the first-generation low-floor buses.

When TransBus announced the development of the Enviro500, KMB became the launch customer by changing the last 20 of an order for 100 Dennis Trident 3s to the Enviro500 in 2002. Later in the same year, KMB placed an order for a further 100. The first Enviro500 arrived in Hong Kong on 12 November 2002 and was registered in January 2003, with all in service by November 2003.

In 2003, KMB placed another order for 65 Enviro500s, quickly followed by a further 50. The bodywork of these buses received a number of minor modifications. The first 112 buses entered service between November 2003 and June 2005, and the remaining three buses were registered by its subsidiary Long Win Bus.

Due to the commencement of the KCR West Rail in late 2003 and KCR Ma On Shan Rail in late 2004, the Transport Department requested KMB to reduce its fleet size, so the registration of these four batches of KMB Enviro500 were delayed and some of them were stored before entering service.

The company received one prototype facelifted Enviro500-body Volvo B9TL in 2005, and a further 85 buses were put into service between 2006 and 2008. All Enviro500-bodied Volvo B9TLs were retired on September 13, 2025, with AVBE69 being the last one to be in service on the said date.

In 2005, KMB ordered a further 25 with modified bodywork and a new Alexander Dennis badge; 24 of them (five had their electronic route destination displays supplied by Gorba instead of Hanover) entered service in early 2006. The last one, a Euro IV-engined prototype, with fleet number ATEU1 (originally ATE257), entered service on 24 May 2006. In 2009, it reemerged as a Euro V-engined bus.

In late 2005, KMB ordered 15 more buses, which entered service in August 2006.

Later, a batch of nine buses with Euro IV engines was ordered for delivery in 2009, which entered service in mid-2009. One of them was fitted with a luggage rack after body assembly. It was quickly followed by another batch of 46 buses for delivery in 2010; 20 of them were eventually diverted to Long Win Bus, and 26 buses entered service with KMB in 2010–2011.

A batch of 35 buses with Euro V engines was ordered for delivery between 2010 and 2011, 30 of them were eventually diverted to Long Win Bus, and 5 buses entered service with KMB in 2011.

In July 2008, one was written off (ATE180) after being burnt out in KMB's depot in Tin Shui Wai on 31 March 2008.

From December 2020 until June 2023, KMB has withdrawn its TransBus Enviro500 (2002 generation) out of service. The last TransBus Enviro500 with Mk1 bodywork (ATE231) was retired on 15 June 2023. The first batch of Enviro500s with Mk2 bodywork were retired on 3 May 2024.

===== Long Win Bus =====
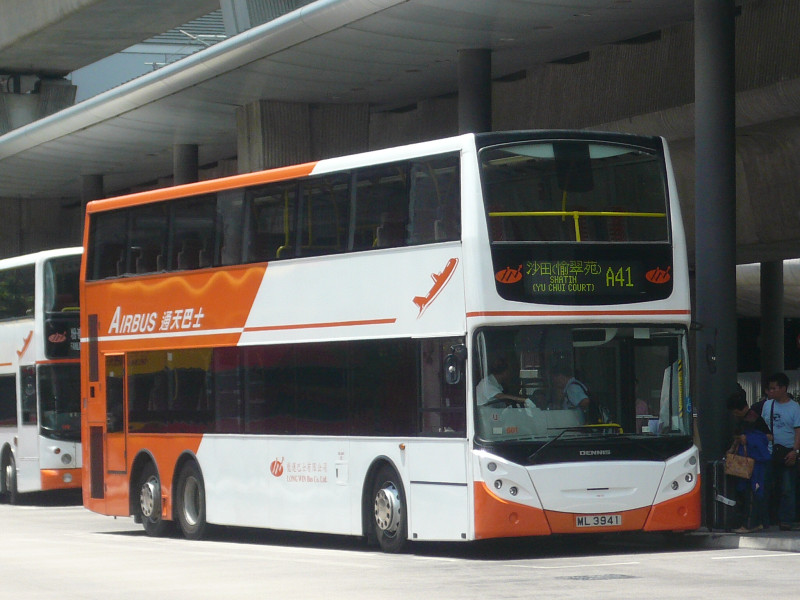
Long Win Bus Enviro500 in June 2007

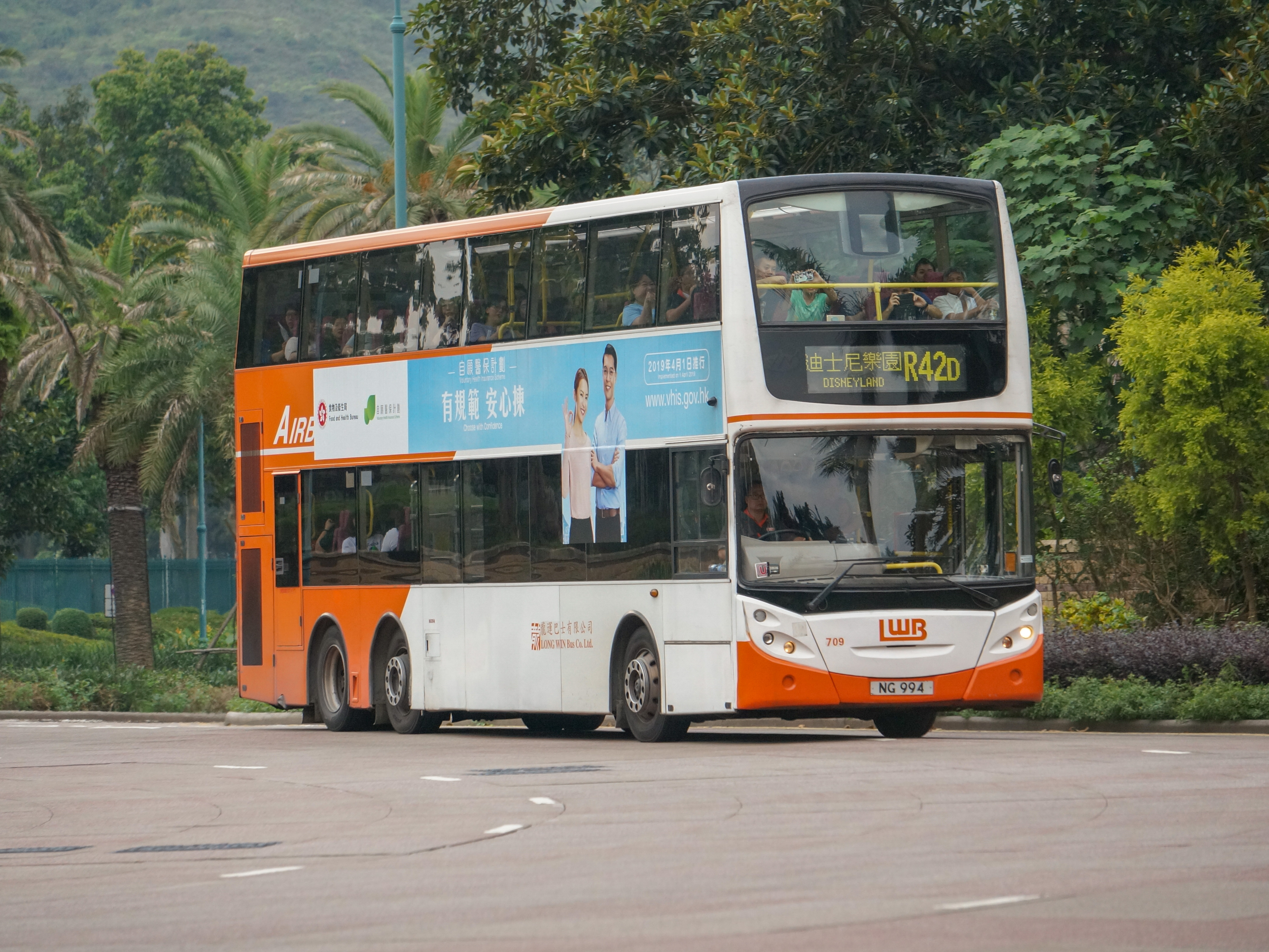
Long Win Bus Enviro500 bodied Volvo B9TL in May 2019

Long Win Bus registered three Enviro500 buses, which were originally ordered by Kowloon Motor Bus, in August 2005 to cope with the increased demand for bus services after the opening of Hong Kong Disneyland. All Enviro500s with Mk1 bodywork were retired on 10 August 2023.

In late 2005, Long Win Bus ordered five more which had luggage racks fitted when new, entering service in June/July 2006. All of them were retired on 10 July 2024.

Long Win Bus received ten Enviro500 bodywork on Volvo B9TL chassis between 2007 and 2008, one of them was built new as an airport coach.

A further batch of seven buses with Euro IV engines had been ordered for delivery in 2009. The first six buses entered service in 2009. The last one, which was fitted with coach seats, entered service in October 2009. These were followed by further five buses, with the first four being registered in December 2009; the last one, which was fitted with coach seats, entered service in April 2010. In 2010, Long Win Bus received 20 more Enviro500 buses with Euro IV engines.

A batch of 6 Enviro500 buses with Euro V engines was ordered for delivery between 2010 and 2011. These, together with 30 diverted from KMB's order, were put into service between 2011 and 2013.

Due to a surplus in Long Win's fleet, 14 of the Euro IV buses have been transferred to KMB in 2020.

===== Citybus =====
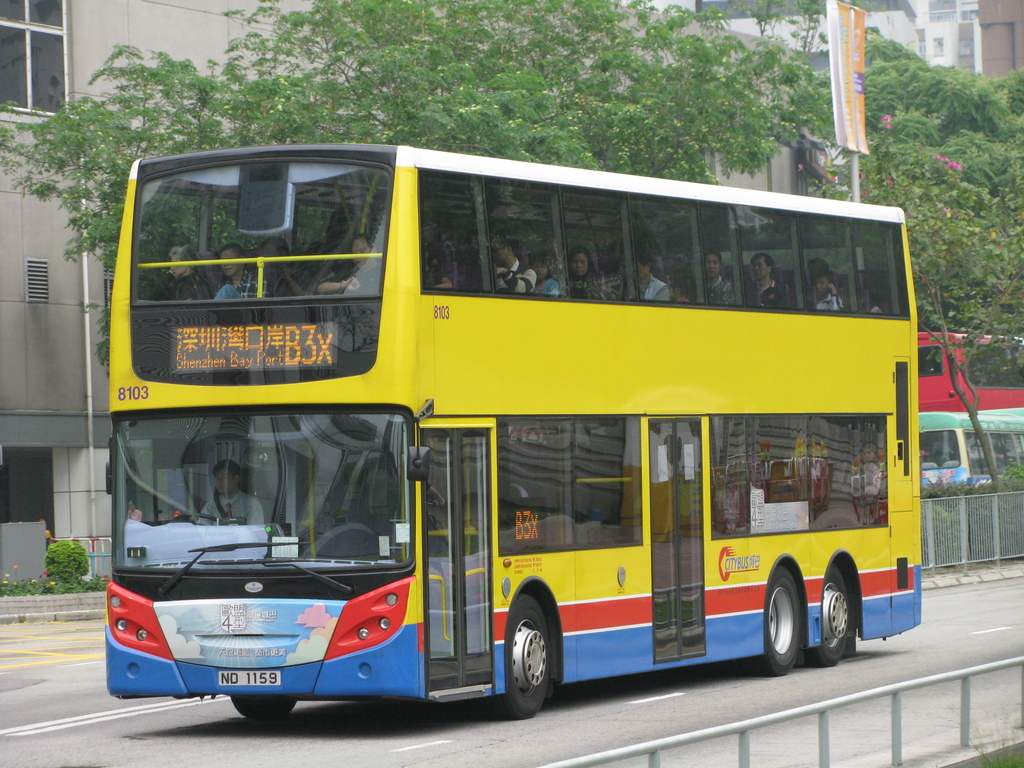
Citybus Enviro500 in April 2008

Citybus ordered 10 Enviro500s with Euro IV engine and luggage racks, soon after its sister company New World First Bus's order. The first batch of chassis arrived Hong Kong in the third quarter of 2007 for body assembly in NWFB depot at Chong Fu Road. They entered service in December 2007 and January 2008. A further batch of 18 Euro IV-engined buses, which were fitted with spiral staircase instead of straight staircase and no luggage rack, entered service in 2009.

===== MTR =====
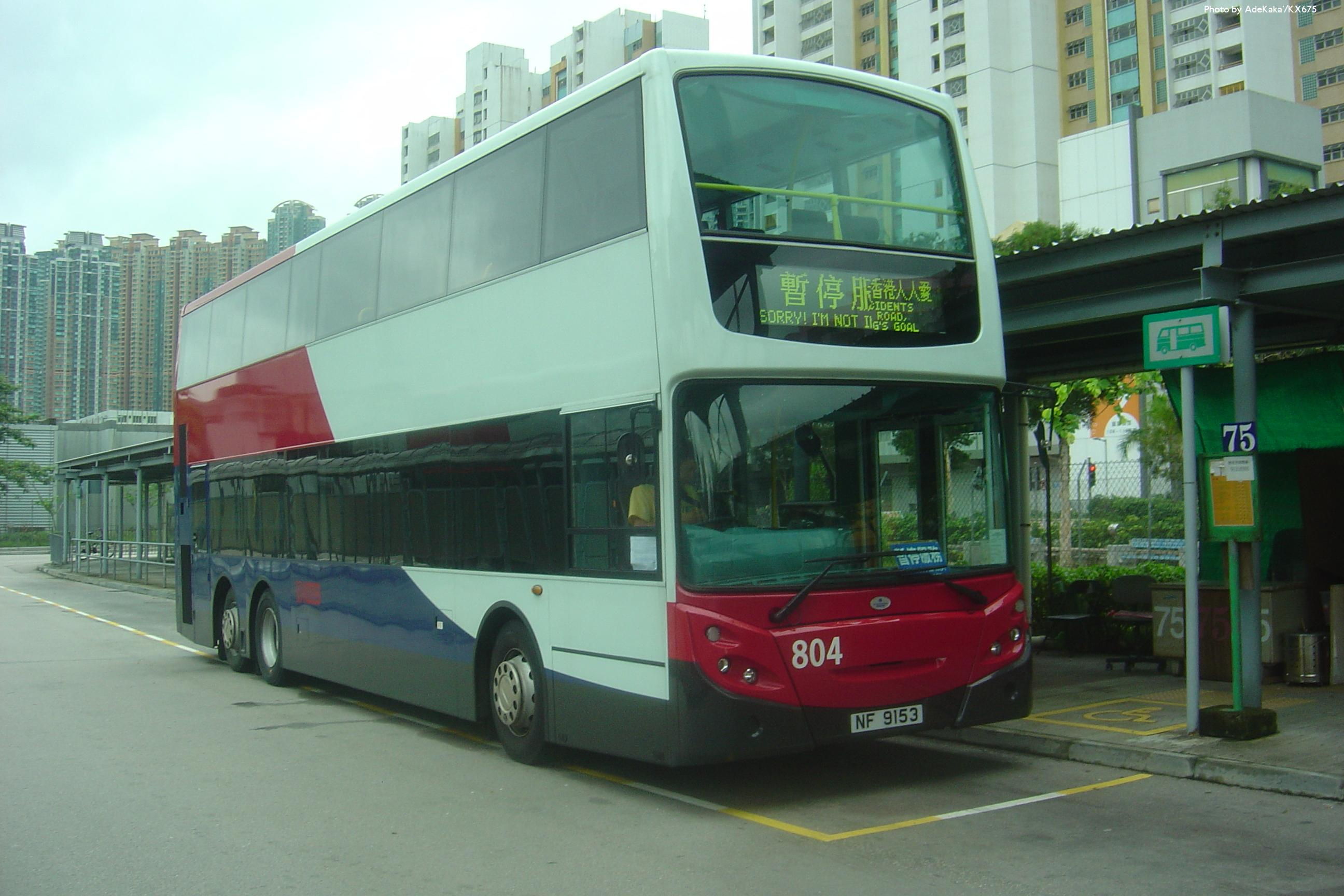
MTR Corporation Enviro500 in June 2008

Kowloon-Canton Railway Corporation originally ordered 9 12-metre (39 ft 4 1/2 in) Euro IV-engined Enviro500 buses in early 2007 for its Feeder Bus service. The first completed bus arrived Hong Kong on 24 November 2007, then registered in February 2008 and entered service in March 2008; the rest of them entered service in March and April 2008.

Due to a railway merger between MTR and KCR in late 2007, they are now operated by MTR Corporation for running MTR Bus (previously known as KCR Feeder Bus) routes.

Later a batch of 15 buses with Euro IV engines was ordered for delivery in 2009, they were first registered in April–August 2009. This was followed by another order for 9 buses in 11.3-metre (37 ft 7/8 in) length which entered service in 2012.

===== New World First Bus =====
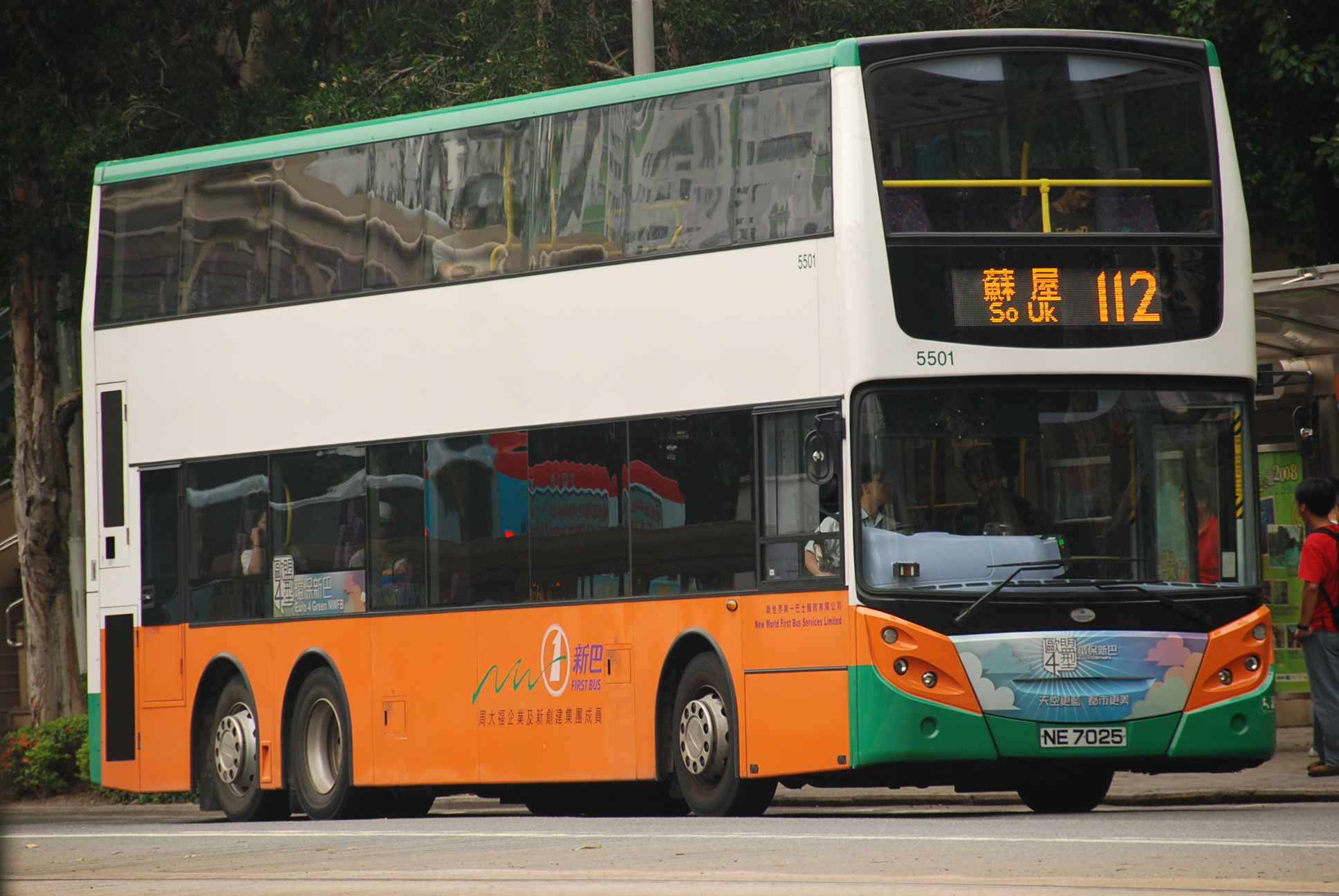
New World First Bus Enviro500 in July 2008

New World First Bus ordered 18 Enviro500 buses with Euro IV engine in early 2007. 17 buses entered service in 2008, another one (fleet number 5504) was shipped to Australia in March 2008, after body assembly, for demonstration in several cities between April and May 2008, it finally entered service in June 2008.

In 2008 New World First Bus ordered 20 11.3-metre (37 ft 7/8 in) examples with Euro IV engines for delivery in 2009. They entered service in July–October 2009. A further batch of 20 similar buses with Euro V engines entered service in early 2010.

In 2010, a batch of 24 12-metre (39 ft 4 1/2 in) buses with Euro V engines was ordered for delivery between 2010 and 2011. They had entered service in 2011.

In 2011 New World First Bus ordered 13 12 metre Enviro500s, all of them entered service in May 2012. These were followed by another 28 12 metre buses which started to enter service in 2013.

In 2020, five Enviro500s (5550-5554) were planned to be converted into open-top buses for tourist routes H1, H1A and H2. as of December 2024, only three Enviro500s 5550-5552 has finished the conversion process with headlights become identical to the original Alexander Dennis Enviro500 MMCs, being renumbered 59900-59902.

Currently there are 123 Enviro500 buses in service with New World First Bus.

===== CLP Group =====
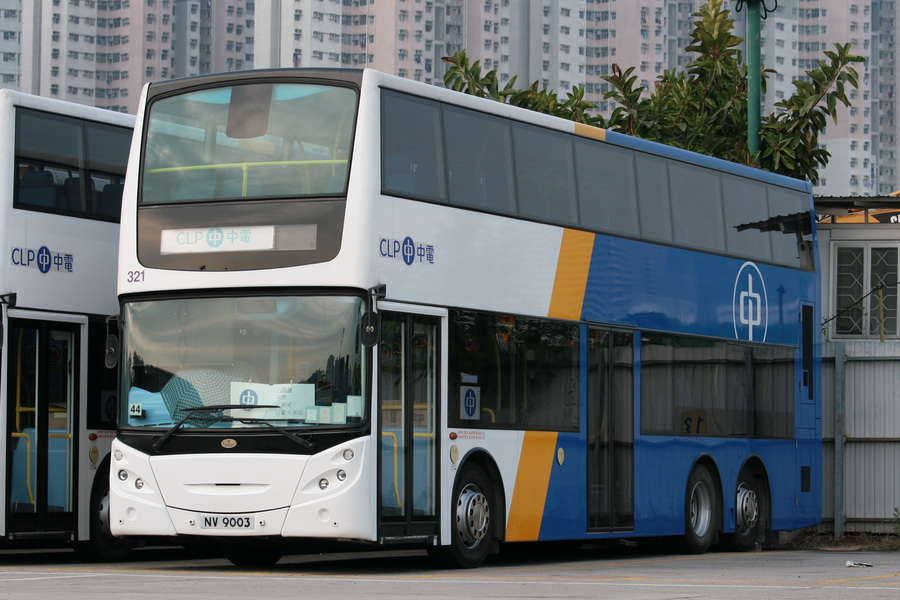
CLP Group Enviro500 in January 2012

CLP Group ordered five Enviro500 buses with Euro IV engines for its staff shuttle bus service in 2008. The specification is similar with Citybus's Enviro500, but without wheelchair place and standees. They had entered service in June 2009.

==== Republic of Korea (demonstration only) ====
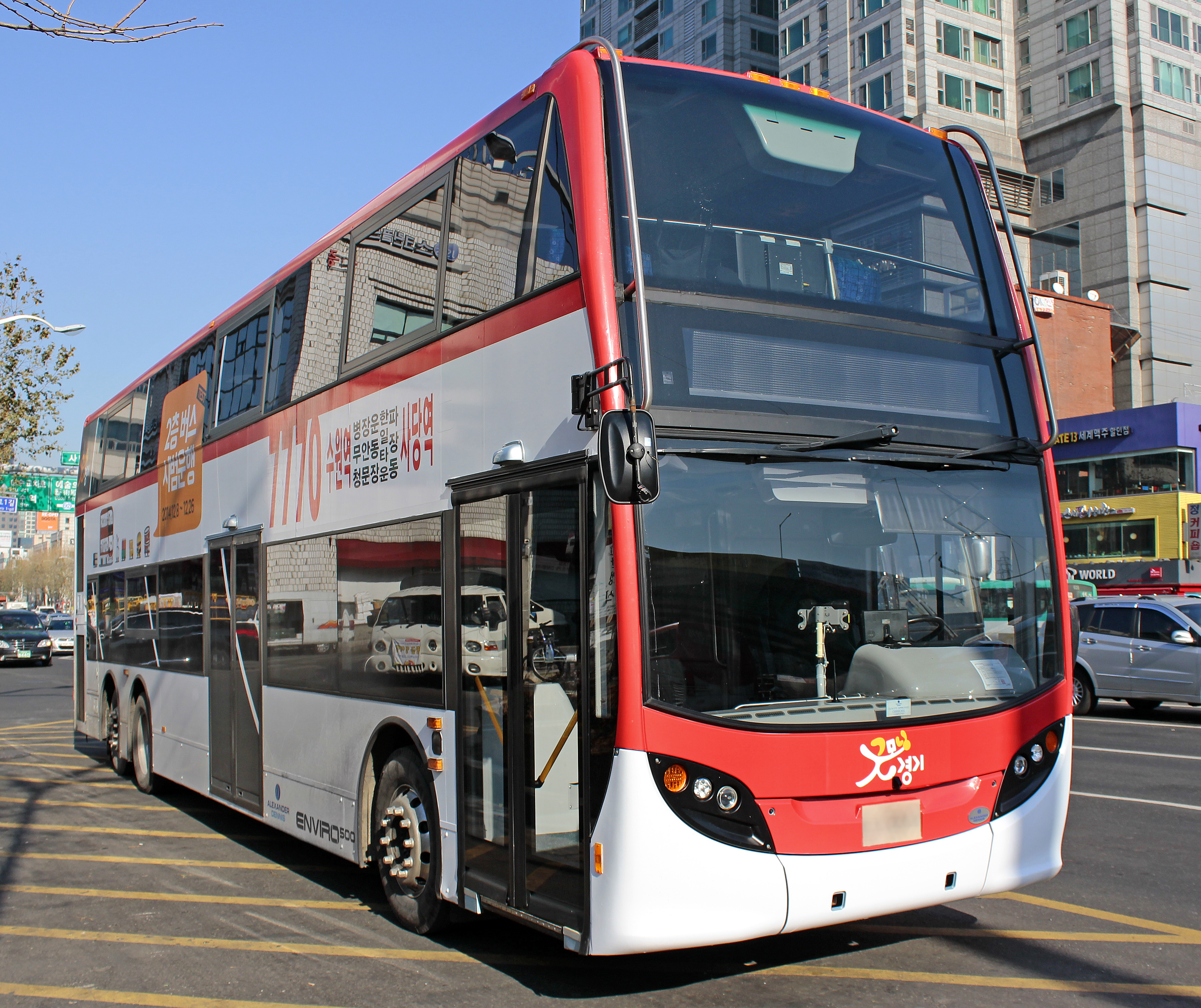
Alexander Dennis Enviro500 in Seoul, South Korea

Gyeonggi province test-ran a 79-seat with 12.86-metre-long (42 ft 2 1/4 in) Enviro500 (North American version) between Seoul and its surrounding cities, which started in mid-November 2014.

=== Europe ===
==== United Kingdom ====
First Glasgow ordered a batch of 25 Enviro500s. They have since moved to First Aberdeen to replace older buses.

As of January 2018, the Enviro500 is no longer offered in the United Kingdom owing to poor sales. As of 2022, several Enviro500s have entered service with Kernow.

From August 2023 to May 2024, all 25 Enviro500s were gradually withdrawn from Kernow and Aberdeen. Most are now with Cambridge Buses for school services, having arrived there via Ensignbus.

==== Ireland ====
Dublin Bus operate a number of Enviro500s on the Volvo B9TL chassis, with a total of 70 bought across two batches between 2005 and 2007 with funding from the Department of Transport to increase capacity on the city's bus routes. A first batch of twenty Enviro500s entered service in December 2005 with Dublin Bus at Donnybrook garage, downsized from what was to be an order of 150 tri-axles. A further batch of fifty Enviro500s, with a slightly longer front overhang and Euro IV engines, entered service in 2007 at Phibsboro depot.

The first twenty buses of the 2005 batch were withdrawn and sold in December 2018.

=== North America ===
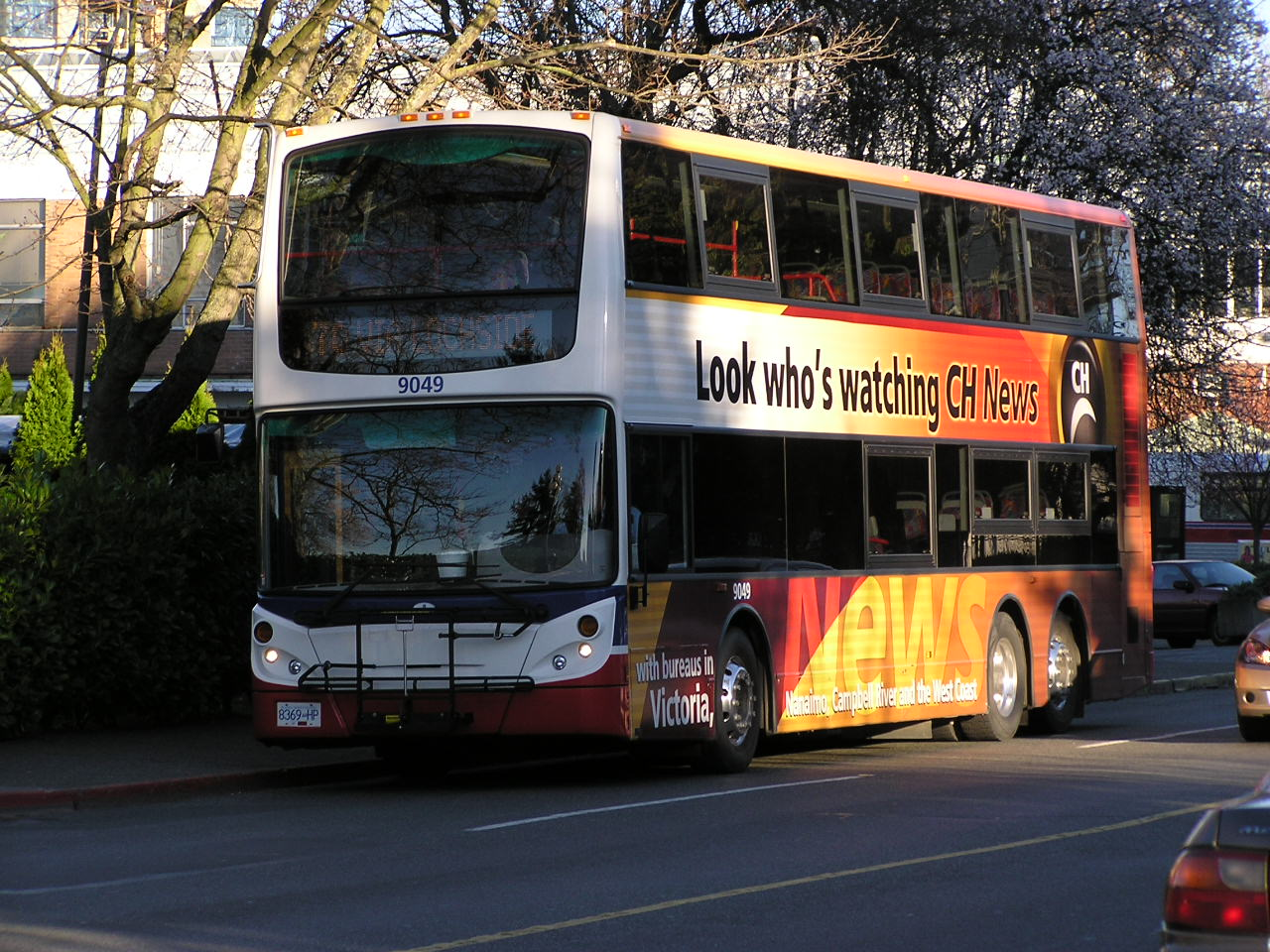
BC Transit Enviro500 in February 2005

In 2004, Alexander Dennis started to explore the North American market for its Enviro500. The American version of the Enviro500 have modified bodies and redesigned fuel tanks, which enable the straight staircase to be moved forward. Alexander Dennis built four left hand drive Enviro500 (one 12-metre-long or 39-foot-4 1/2-inch bus and three 12.8-metre-long or 41-foot-11 7/8-inch buses) for demonstration in the United States and Canada.

Bus operators which evaluated the Enviro500 included Community Transit of Snohomish County, Washington (December 2005), Unitrans of Davis (January 2006, two weeks), OC Transpo of Ottawa (28 June to 12 July 2006 and February 2007), San Francisco Municipal Railway of San Francisco (November 2007 to January 2008) and the Réseau de transport de la Capitale of Quebec City (March 2013).

Dennis also built one 12-metre Enviro500 demonstrator for long-term loan. It was first loaned to Community Transit between 2007 and 2009 which put it into service on 1 August 2007, the bus was used on commuter routes between Seattle and various points in Snohomish County during its first year in operation. From September 2010, it was loaned to Strathcona County Transit on a one-year lease for the operator's one-year-long double-decker pilot project. The pilot is part of an exploration of different high-capacity bus types to carry more passengers on the high-demand commuter routes, which are between Strathcona County and Edmonton; an articulated bus is also being evaluated as an alternative and there is no commitment to put any Alexander Dennis model or any double-decker design into permanent service. This bus becomes the first double-decker to be used for regular transit service in Alberta.

In late 2008, Alexander Dennis announced the assembly of the American version of the Enviro500 by ElDorado National in Riverside, California,.

In 2011, Alexander Dennis unveiled a restyled Enviro500 body design for the North American market, which had the same front as the Enviro400. This was first used on the "Go-Anywhere" version developed for GO Transit, which has an overall height of 4.115 m (13 ft 6 in). This height would become standard with the MMC model introduced in 2015.

==== Canada ====
BC Transit

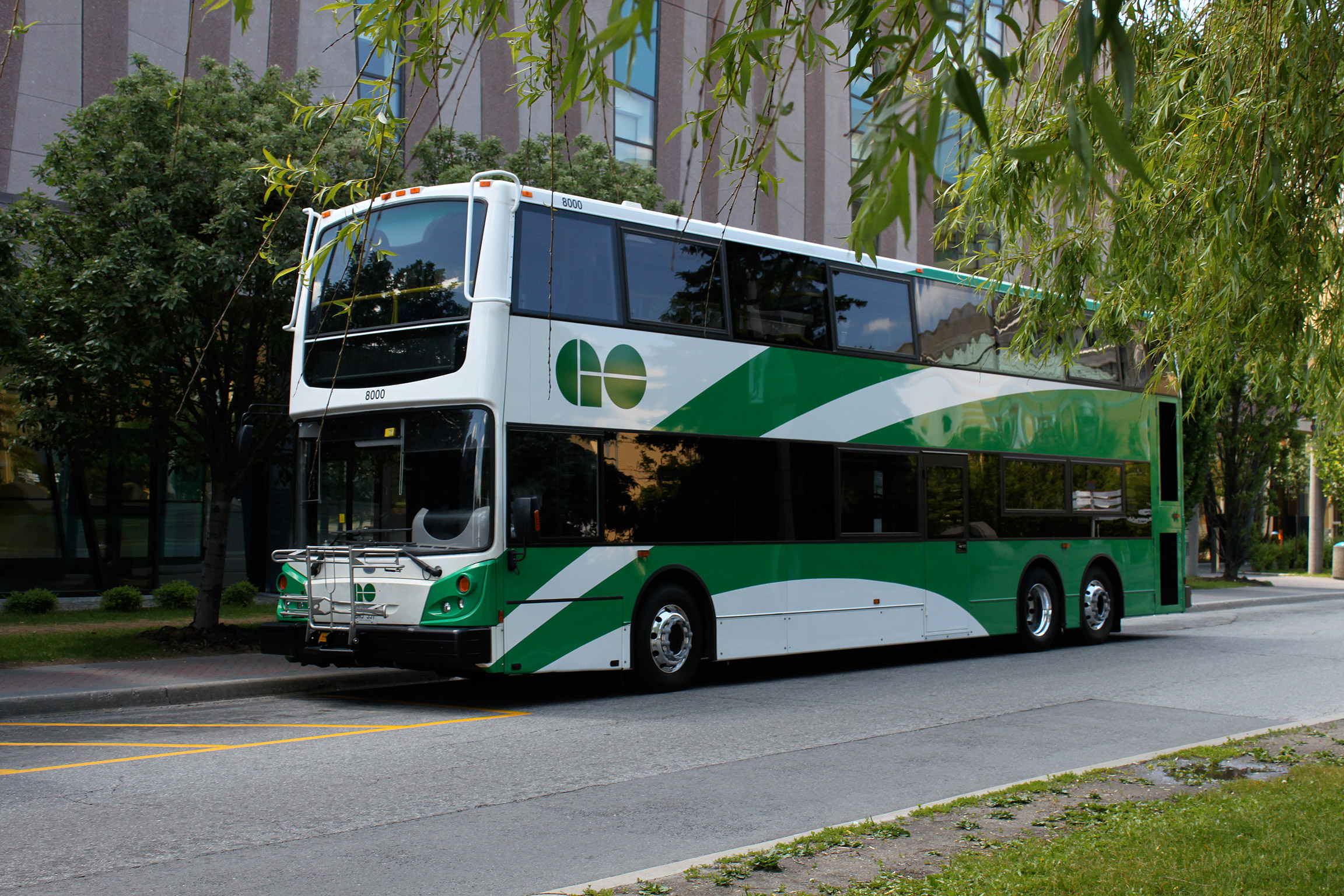
GO Transit Enviro500 in Toronto, Ontario, Canada in June 2009

BC Transit, the first Canadian operator of double-decker transit buses, ordered nine Enviro500s, which were allocated to the Victoria Regional Transit System in Victoria, British Columbia with fleet numbers 9041–9049. These vehicles entered service in early 2005, joining the nineteen Trident 3 buses already in service since 2000. These were followed by another 26 (9501-9526) which entered service in 2008; sixteen of them (9501-9516) were originally allocated to Victoria and the other ten (9517-9526) to the Kelowna Regional Transit System in Kelowna. All units are currently allocated to Victoria.

In 2009, BC Transit received one hybrid-electric Enviro500H (now numbered 9527) for evaluation, and followed it up in 2011 by purchasing one Enviro500 demonstration vehicle built in 2007 but repowered with an EPA 2010-compliant Cummins ISL engine (now numbered 9528). Three more Enviro500s (9529-9531) entered service in 2013, built in 2008 and acquired second-hand from OC Transpo (see below). All of these vehicles are used in Victoria.

GO Transit

GO Transit, the regional transportation authority serving the Greater Toronto Area in Ontario, currently operates 127 12.8-metre-long Enviro500s in its fleet. Like its fleet of coach buses, they have only one door in the front. Earlier, it tested a double-decker Trident 3 on loan from Victoria in May 2002, which had an extra rear door. However, it did not place any orders until early 2008, when it introduced twelve commuter-type Enviro500s (numbered 8000–8011), Ten extra units (8012-8021) entered service in early 2009. Both of these batches have a height of 4.2 metres (13 ft 9 3/8 in), making them too high to meet bridge clearance (under overpasses etc.) requirements in the province.

After the introduction of the Go-Anywhere version of the Enviro500, In 2012, GO Transit ordered 25 of these new models (8101-8125), also 12.8 metres (41 ft 11 7/8 in) long. The first bus was delivered on 3 April 2013 and the remaining 24 in May 2013. These were followed by seventy in 2014, delivered in two batches (8126-8165 and 8166–8195), and a further ten (8196-8205) in 2015. Withdrawals began during COVID-19 pandemic and some gave to Big Bus Tours San Francisco as a result.

OC Transpo

OC Transpo of Ottawa, Ontario, purchased three transit-type Enviro500s in 2008 as part of a one-year pilot project to investigate the use of double-deckers on high-capacity routes. Numbered from 1201 to 1203, they were operated on a variety of routes, but their height, which exceeded the requirements of the MTO, made them impractical for continued use. These three demo buses were sold to BC Transit in the summer of 2012 (see above).

OC Transpo subsequently ordered 75 Go-Anywhere Enviro500s (numbered 8001–8075) for delivery in 2012/13, the first one officially arriving on 23 August 2012. 73 of 75 these buses are in service as of 12 January 2019.

Strathcona County Transit

Strathcona County Transit ordered 14 transit-type Enviro500s (numbered 8001–8014) for their commuter service between Sherwood Park and Edmonton, Alberta, with the first arriving in late 2013 and subsequent buses arriving by the spring of 2014. They chose double-deckers over articulated transit and motor coaches after a year of testing between September 2010 and October 2011.

==== United States ====
===== Sightseeing operations =====
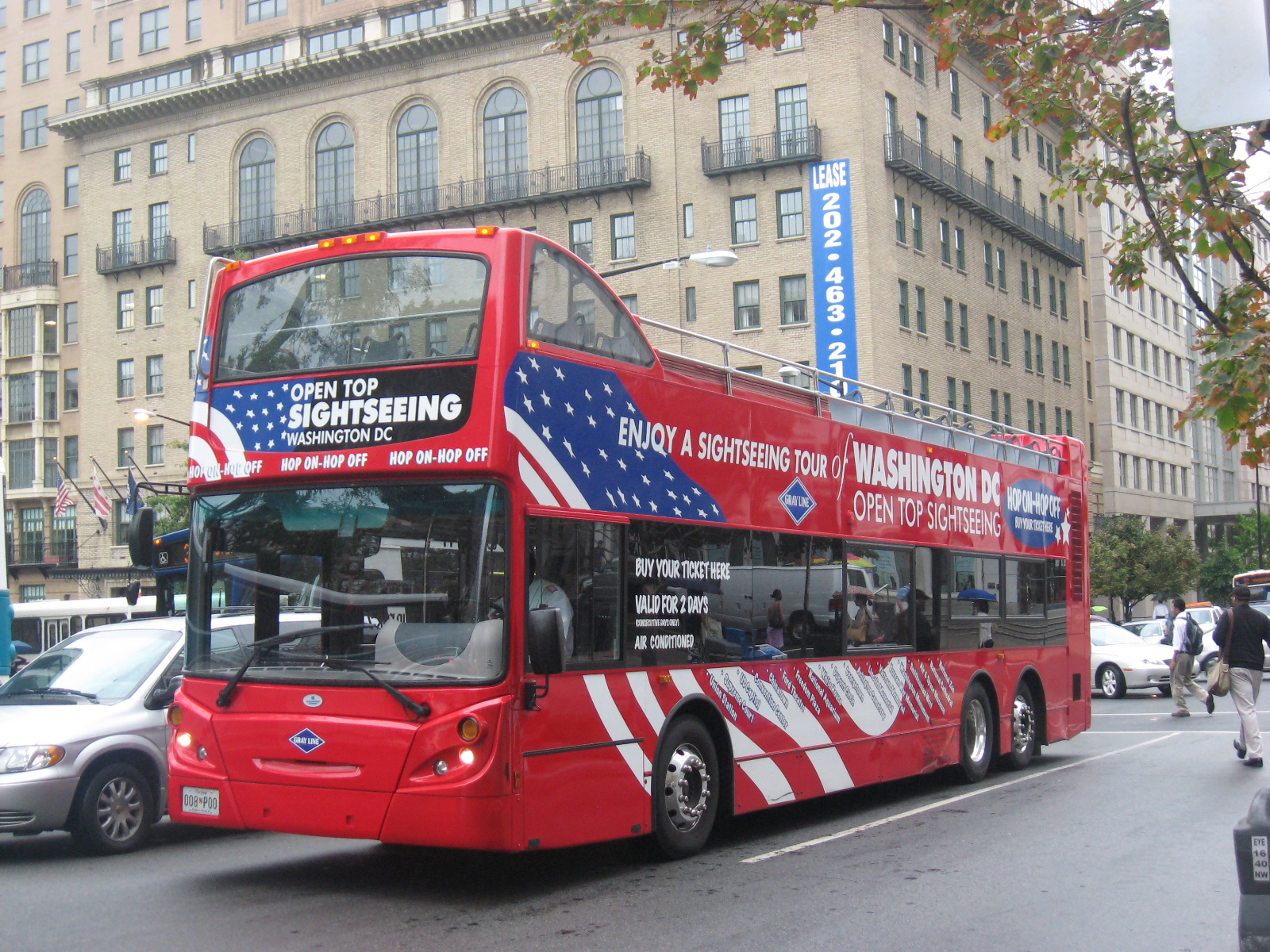
Gray Line open-top Enviro500 in Washington, D.C. in August 2008

Gray Line New York, owned by Twin America ordered 20 open-top Enviro500 for its sightseeing operations in New York and put them into service in spring 2005, these were the first open-top Enviro500 built (another 13 would later be ordered), it also had City Sightseeing contract. Gray Line also received 3 Enviro500 in summer 2005 for operation in San Francisco but these were converted to open-top and sold to Big Bus Tours Miami in 2015.

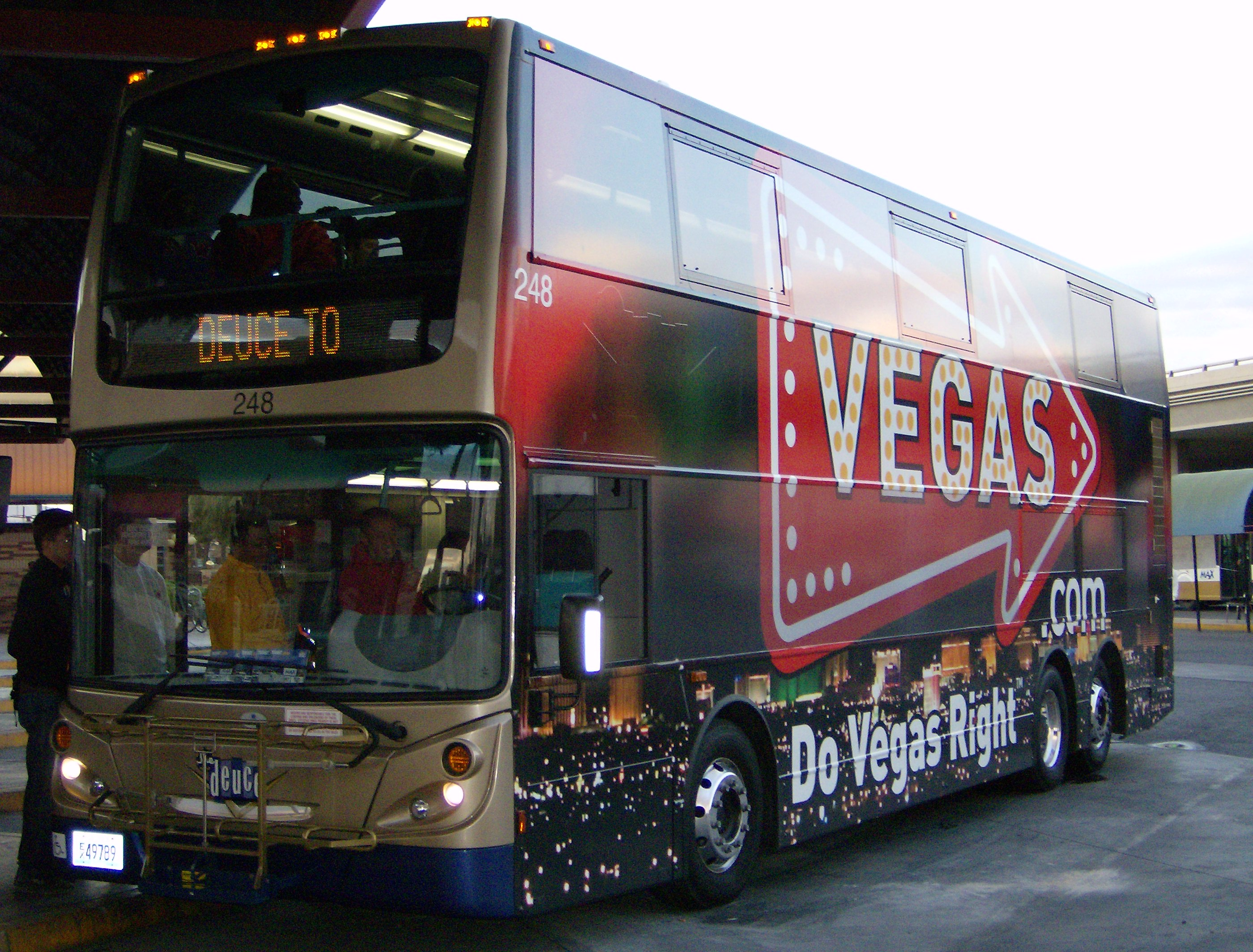
Enviro500 in Las Vegas in November 2005

Big Bus Tours, a sightseeing company, ordered 16 open-top Enviro500 for sightseeing operations in the US, delivery of these buses started in early 2007. Eight of the Enviro500 are destined for San Francisco, and the rest of them are destined for Washington, D.C.

===== Normal operations =====
Citizens Area Transit (now RTC Transit) of Las Vegas had its first 50 Enviro500s enter service by October 2005. The service, marketed as "The Deuce", runs along the Las Vegas Strip. Certain high-traffic routes, such as along Maryland Parkway and Nellis Boulevard, have also used these buses. They offer extra ventilation grilles outside the engine compartment to cope with Southern Nevada's dry desert climate and high summertime temperatures. Las Vegas's Enviro500s have the largest air conditioning system ever created for a transit vehicle, with eight fans fitted on the air conditioning unit. As of October 2006, CAT had firm orders for another 41 of the type worth $29.8 million; these were delivered in late 2007. A further 40 had also been ordered for delivery in 2008; these were 12.8 meters (41 ft 11 7/8 in) long and had a second staircase to speed loading and unloading. All these vehicles were used for regular fixed-route operations, not for sightseeing operations.

Community Transit signed a five-year contract on 2 July 2009 with Alexander Dennis to deliver up to 120 Enviro500 coaches after the trial of an Enviro500 demonstrator. The company introduced a fleet of 23 12.8 m (41 ft 11 7/8 in) Enviro500s in 2011.

Unitrans (the student-run transit service of University of California, Davis, known for years for its operation of former London Transport double-decker buses) ordered two Enviro500 which were delivered in early 2010; these are the first batch of Enviro500s with the bodywork assembled by ElDorado National.

SLO Transit ordered one Enviro500 which entered service in late 2010.

Hele-On Bus introduced one 12.8m Enviro500 in the first half of 2011.

=== Oceania ===
==== Australia ====
An Enviro500 with Kiwi Bus Builders bodywork was unveiled in 2011. This bus was the first Enviro500 with bodywork constructed by other bodybuilders, it was built for Rockleigh Tours in Melbourne. The chassis was narrowed to comply with Australian Design Rules.

== See also ==
- List of buses

=== Competitors ===
- BCI Enterprise
- Neoplan Centroliner
- Wright Eclipse Gemini
- Wright Explorer
