= Volvo B8RLE =

Low-entry single-deck bus chassis

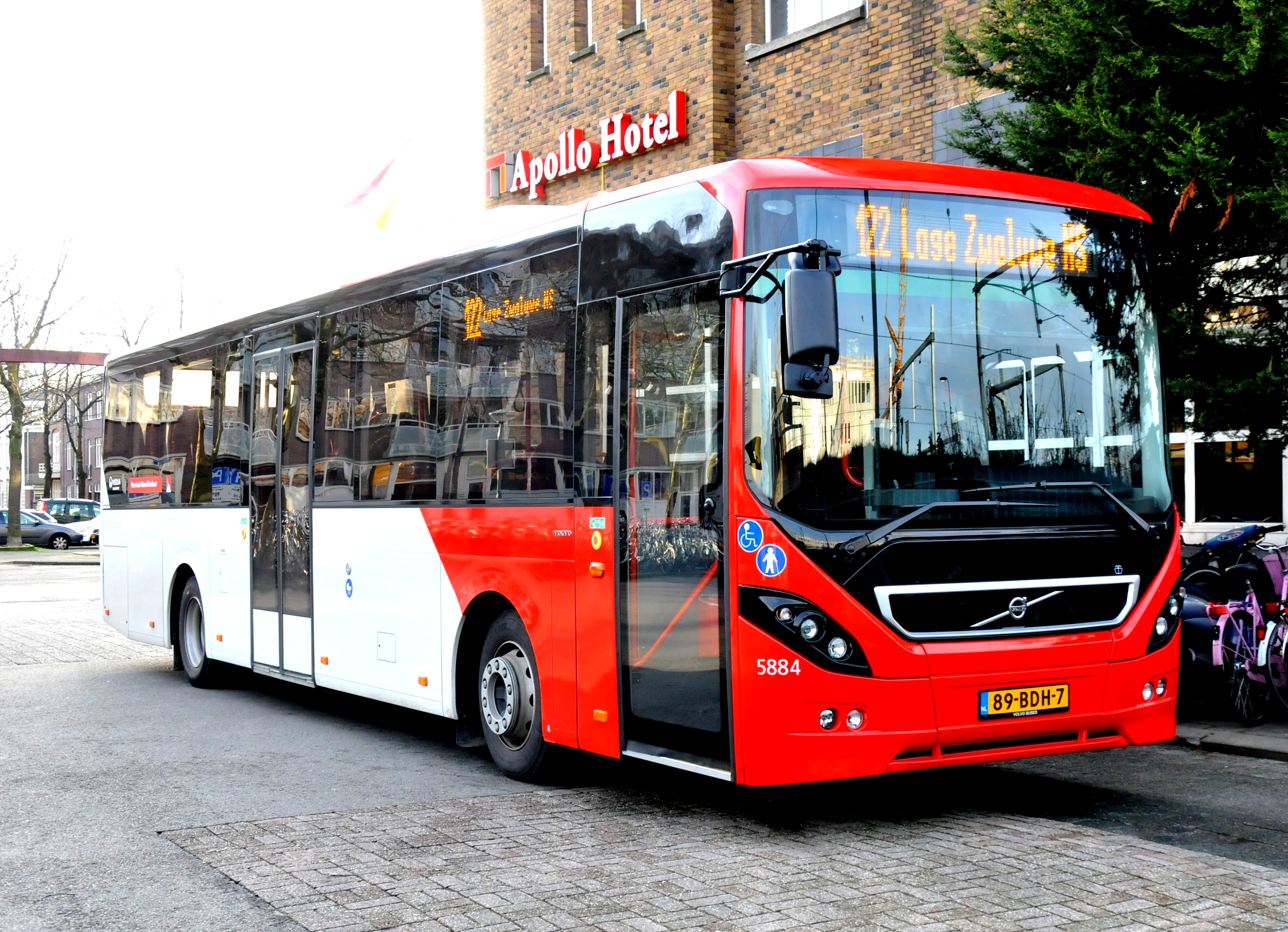
- Veolia Transport 8900LE-bodied B8RLE in Breda.

Overview
- Manufacturer: Volvo
- Production: 2013–present
- Assembly: Borås, Sweden; Curitiba, Brazil; Santiago, Chile; Subic, Philippines

Body and chassis
- Class: Bus chassis
- Doors: 1 to 3
- Floor type: Low entry

Powertrain
- Engine: Volvo D8K (Euro VI), D8C (Euro III/V)
- Capacity: 50–90 passengers
- Power output: 250-350 bhp
- Transmission: ZF EcoLife 6AP1200B (280 hp), 6AP1400B (320, 350 hp); Voith DIWA.6 (320 hp), Volvo I-Shift

Dimensions
- Length: 10.2–12.8 metres (4x2); 12.4-14.9 metres (6x2); 17.1m-18.3 metres (articulated)

Chronology
- Predecessor: Volvo B7RLE; Volvo B9RLE; Volvo B12BLEA (articulated)
- Successor: Volvo BZR

The Volvo B8RLE is a 7.7-litre-engined low-entry bus chassis manufactured by Volvo since 2013 for left-hand drive markets. It was designed as a replacement for the B7RLE and the B9RLE. The right-hand drive version was launched in November 2014.

Initially available in two- and tri-axle variants, the articulated version of the B8RLE called the B8RLEA is available in Australia since late 2014. In 2017, Euro III and V versions were launched worldwide with engine outputs at 250 and 330 hp. The 250 hp version is marketed in Brazil as the Volvo B250RLE.

It is also available as a medium-floor bus chassis, known as Volvo B8R. Throughout Europe, the B8RLE is most commonly available as the semi-integral Volvo 8900LE. In the United Kingdom, the B8RLE is offered with MCV Evora and Wright Eclipse 3 bodywork, and formerly also with MCV Evolution 2 bodywork. Additionally, Plaxton has also developed a low-entry version called the Plaxton Panther LE coach based on the B8RLE chassis with the 6x2 tri-axles configuration, for the intercity bus-commuter coach market. In Spain the B8R and the B8RLE is only available with the bodywork Unvi Urbis, Castrosua Magnus E, Sunsundegui SB3 and Sunsundegui Astral (this bodywork is discontinued).

In the Philippines, Volvo Buses launched the B8RLE in August 2018. The bus chassis is imported from Borås, Sweden and bodywork is made by Autodelta Coach Builders.

In Indonesia, Indotruck Utama (as a representative of Volvo Buses Indonesia) launched the B8RLE in March 2019 at Busworld Southeast Asia.

== Engines ==
D8K, 7698 cc, in-line 6-cylinder turbodiesel (2013–present)

- D8K280 - 206 kW (280 bhp), 1050 Nm, Euro VI
- D8K320 - 235 kW (320 bhp), 1200 Nm, Euro VI
- D8K350 - 258 kW (350 bhp), 1400 Nm, Euro VI

D8C, 7698 cc, in-line 6 cyl. turbodiesel (2017–present)

- D8C250 - 186 kW (250 bhp), 950 Nm, Euro III/Euro V
- D8C330 - 246 kW (330 bhp), 1200 Nm, Euro III/Euro V

== Operators ==
=== Australia ===
The Volvo B8RLE has been popular with many bus operators in Australia, most of which also operate the Volvo B7RLE in large numbers.

- Brisbane Transport operate 139 Volgren Optimus-bodied B8RLEs, They also operate 40 articulated B8RLEAs.
- Transperth operates 592 B8RLEs and 120 B8RLEAs, all with Volgren Optimus bodies. More are currently being delivered.
- The State Transit Authority of NSW ordered a total of 168 Volvo B8RLEs with a mix of Custom CB80 (58), Volgren Optimus (64) and BusTech VST Mk IV (46) bodywork. Of these vehicles, 102 meet Euro V emission standards while 66 are Euro VI compliant. Following the dissolution of the STA these vehicles were distributed among a number of other operators.
- Transit Systems NSW operates 26 Volgren Optimus-bodied B8RLE, with 10 inherited from the State Transit Authority being the Euro V variant.
- Transdev NSW previously ordered 50 Bustech VST Mk IV bodied Volvo B8RLEs with the Euro VI Volvo D8K engine as part of its contract to operate Station Link alongside Hillsbus. These vehicles have since been re-distributed between ComfortDelGro Corporation (CDC) Region 14 and Transit Systems Inner West. Transdev John Holland inherited 56 Euro V Volvo B8RLEs with Volgren Optimus and Euro VI vehicles with Bustech VST bodywork from the State Transit Authority.
- Busways NSW operates 122 B8RLEs, 58 with Custom Bus CB80 bodies (inherited from State Transit), 10 with Custom Endeavour bodywork and 54 with Volgren Optimus bodies (24 Euro V inherited from State Transit and 34 Euro VI).
- Keolis Downer operates 34 Bustech VST bodied B8RLE's (Euro V) in Newcastle and 19 similar vehicles in Sydney. An additional 11 Euro VI Volvo B8RLEs with Express Buses bodywork were ordered from mid-2023 to replace older vehicles in the fleet.
- Ventura Bus Lines operates 19 Volgren Optimus bodied B8RLEs and one Volgren Optimus bodied B8RLEA.

=== United Kingdom ===
The first example in the United Kingdom was delivered to Arriva Shires & Essex in 2014. As at January 2021, 88 have been delivered with Lothian Buses the largest purchaser with 45, 15 of which are fitted with Wright 13.2m bodywork for subsidiary company East Coast Buses with the remaining 30 fitted with 12.9m MCV eVoRa bodies. East Yorkshire Motor Services purchased 6 with MCV Evolution bodywork in late 2015–2016. Stagecoach East have 17 B8RLEs on the Wright Eclipse 3 and MCV eVoRa, and Trentbarton also have some on the Wright Eclipse 3 body, Stagecoach South Wales have recently received an order of 12 eVoRa bodies for their TrawsCymru work. Transport for Greater Manchester purchased 34 eVoRa bodies under the Bee Network. with 18 examples operated by First Manchester and other 16 operated by Stagecoach Manchester. Cardiff Bus received a batch of 20 with 10.8 metre MCV Evora bodywork in April 2026. In 2022, Translink (Northern Ireland) also ordered 6 Sunsundegui SB3 bodied B8RLEs for their Goldline express service.

=== South Korea ===
Since 2015, several bus operators in Gyeonggi Province including subsidiaries of KD Transportation Group are purchasing B8RLE double-deckers with its bodywork by Daji Motors Enterprise Co.(大吉汽車 in Taiwan), in order to handle exceeding demands of several express bus lines covering Seoul metropolitan area.

=== Taiwan ===
In 2016, Kaohsiung Transportation introduced 2 3-axle open-top double-decker B8RLE bus with its bodywork by Daji Motors Enterprise(Chinese: 大吉汽車) in Kaohsiung, Taiwan. Then, San Chung Bus in Taipei and Tainan Bus in Tainan also introduced this 3-axle open-top double-decker B8RLE for city sightseeing routes.

In 2019, Shing Nan Bus Company in Tainan introduced 22 2-axle single-deck B8RLE bus with Daji Motors body, as a successor of its Daji-bodied B7RLE single-deck bus, for public bus service Tainan City Bus and THSR Shuttle Bus in urban and suburban Tainan.

=== Philippines ===
Since September 2018, Precious Grace Transport (Premium Point-to-Point bus or P2P) are purchasing B8RLE low-entry buses (Autodelta Volvo 8900LE replica) body by Autodelta Coach Builders, Inc. are built in Subic, Zambales, in order to handle exceeding demands of several Premium Point-to-Point bus service covering TriNoma to Bulacan route.

=== Chile ===
Since 2020, the company Subus Chile, which is part of the Red Metropolitana de Movilidad, operates with 201 Volvo B8RLEA buses. In 2022, 564 Volvo B8R buses were delivered to Chile, of which 173 Volvo buses are operated by Metropol Chile and 391 Volvo buses are operated by RBU Santiago (Transdev). A large part of the bus lines on which these buses operate are the most extensive in the system.

=== Singapore ===
Sentosa Development Corporation operates a fleet of 6 Volvo B8RLE buses with Liannex bodywork on the Sentosa Bus Network. A further 2 buses with SC Chivalrous bodywork were acquired by ComfortDelGro Bus to supplement the fleet of 6 Volvo B8RLE buses owned by Sentosa Development Corporation. These B8RLE buses entered service in 2018. these buses were powered by Volvo D8K-320 in-line 6-cylinder turbocharged engine (7,698cc) and fitted with a 6-speed automatic ZF Ecolife 6AP 1400C gearbox. It's also Selective Catalytic Reduction (SCR) technology, required the diesel exhaust fluids using of AdBlue.

=== United Arab Emirates ===
Dubai's Roads and Transport Authority (RTA) has signed a contract for purchasing 373 buses of Volvo B8R Sunsundegui SB3 along with a 10-year maintenance contract in support of Dubai's mobility plan and to cope with the rising number of public bus riders.

== Gallery ==
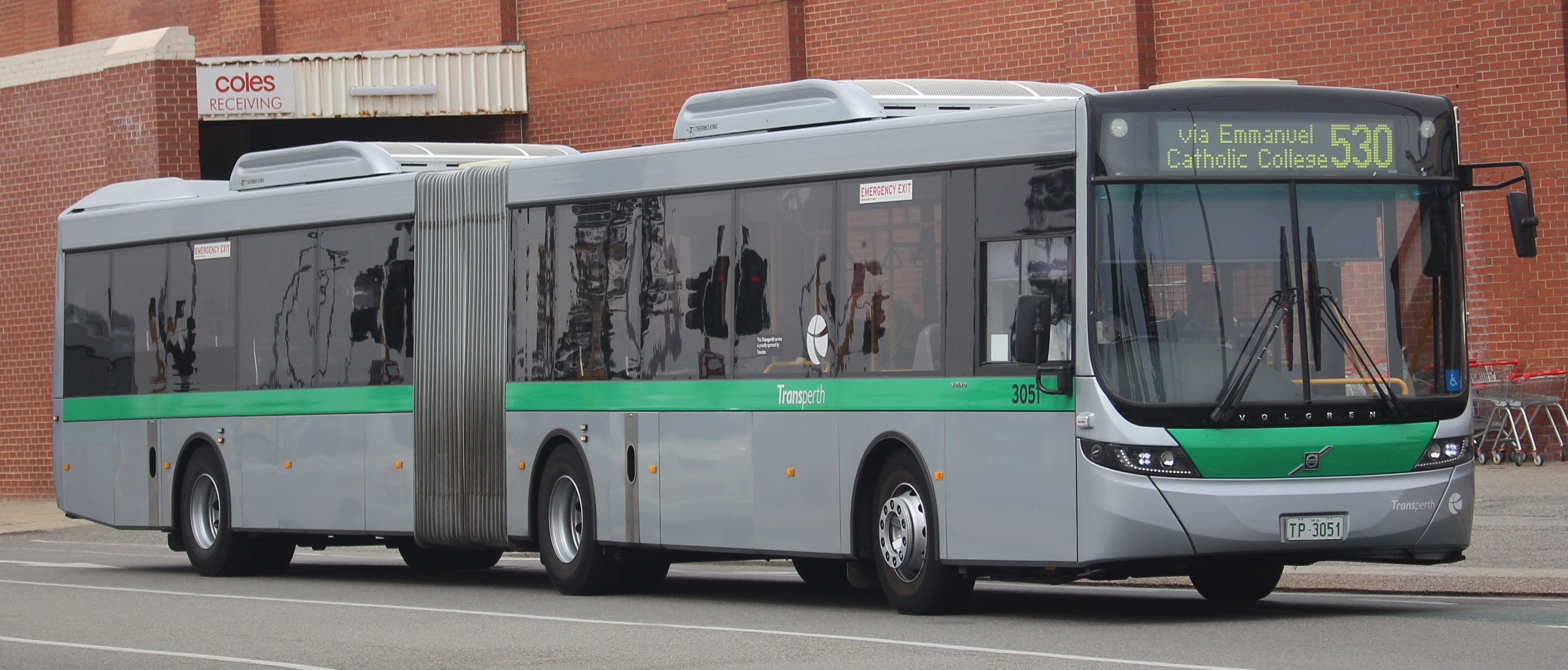
Transperth Volgren Optimus-bodied Volvo B8RLEA

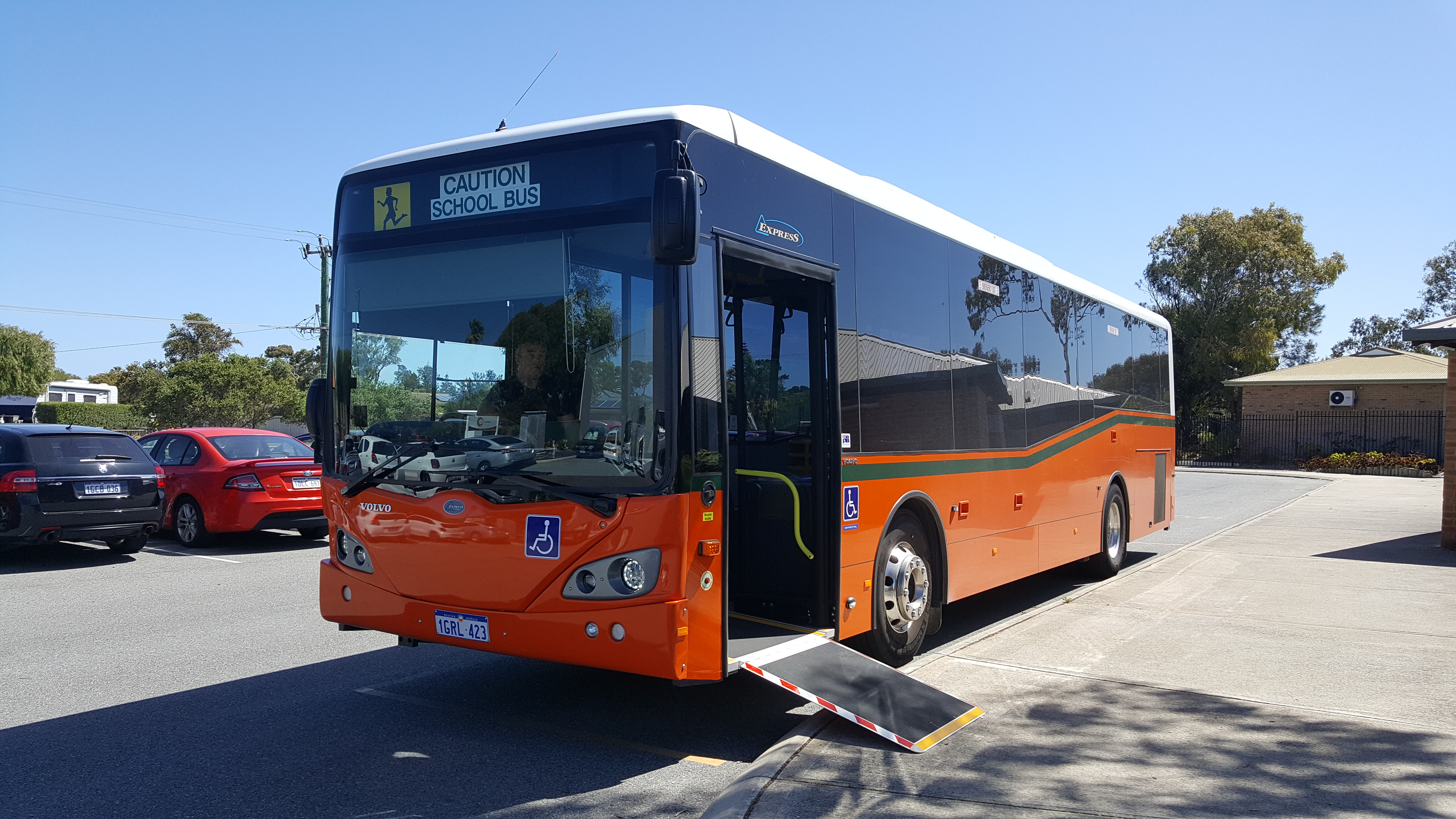
An Express Coach Builders-bodied B8RLE, currently used as a special needs school bus in Perth, Western Australia.

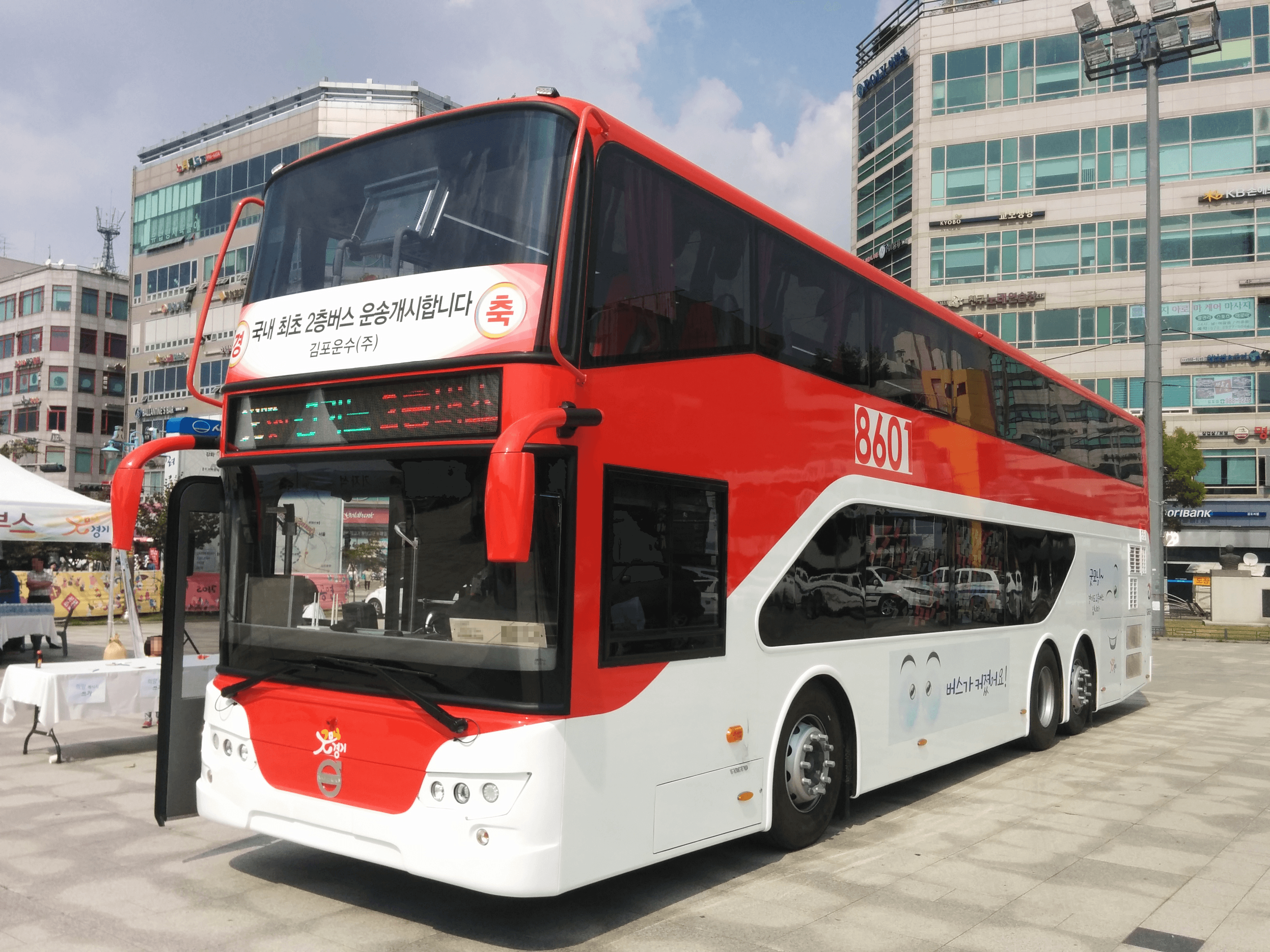
Gimpo Trans Daji bodied Volvo B8RLE double-decker

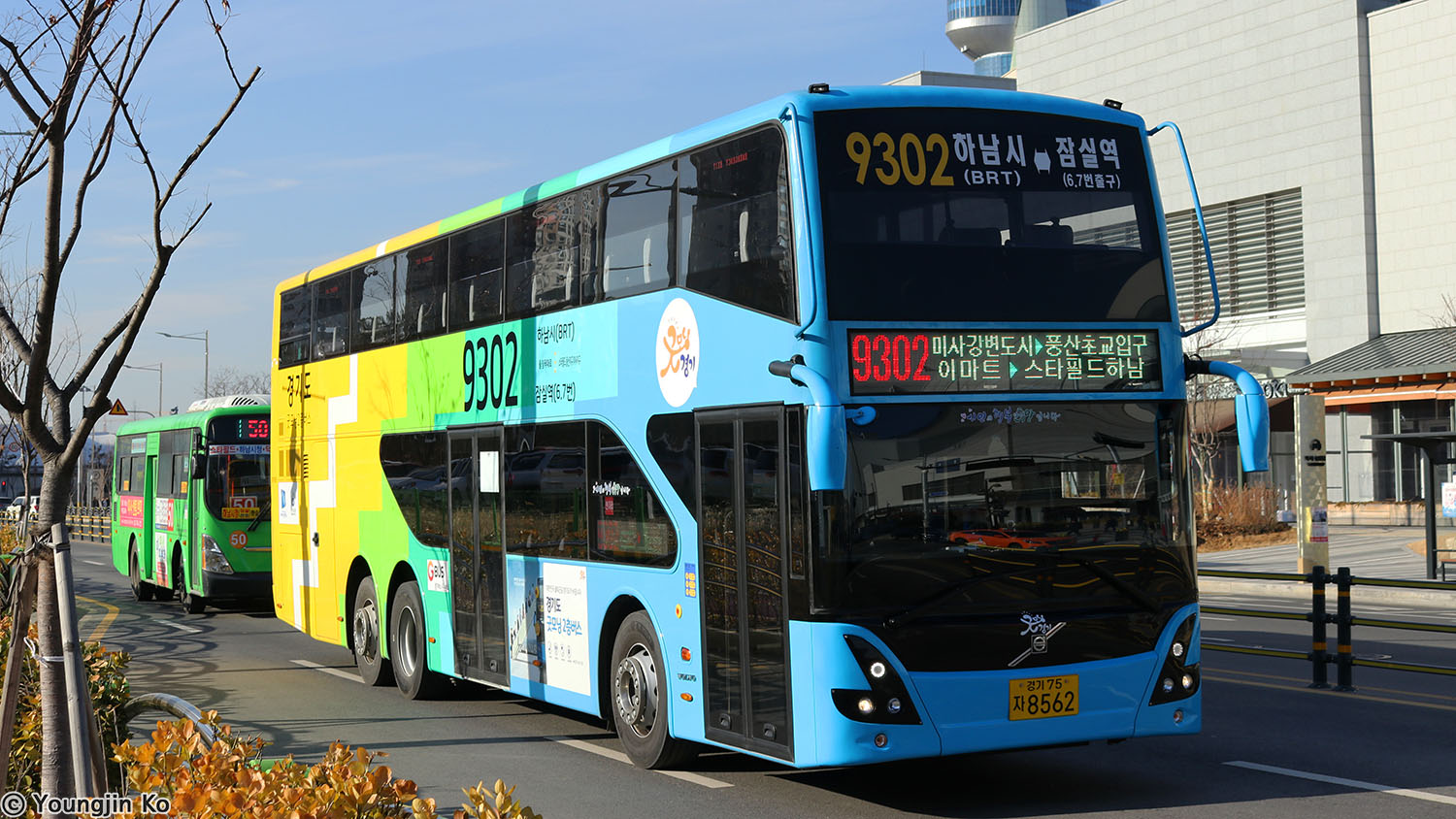
Gyeonggi ComTrans Daji bodied Volvo B8RLE double-decker

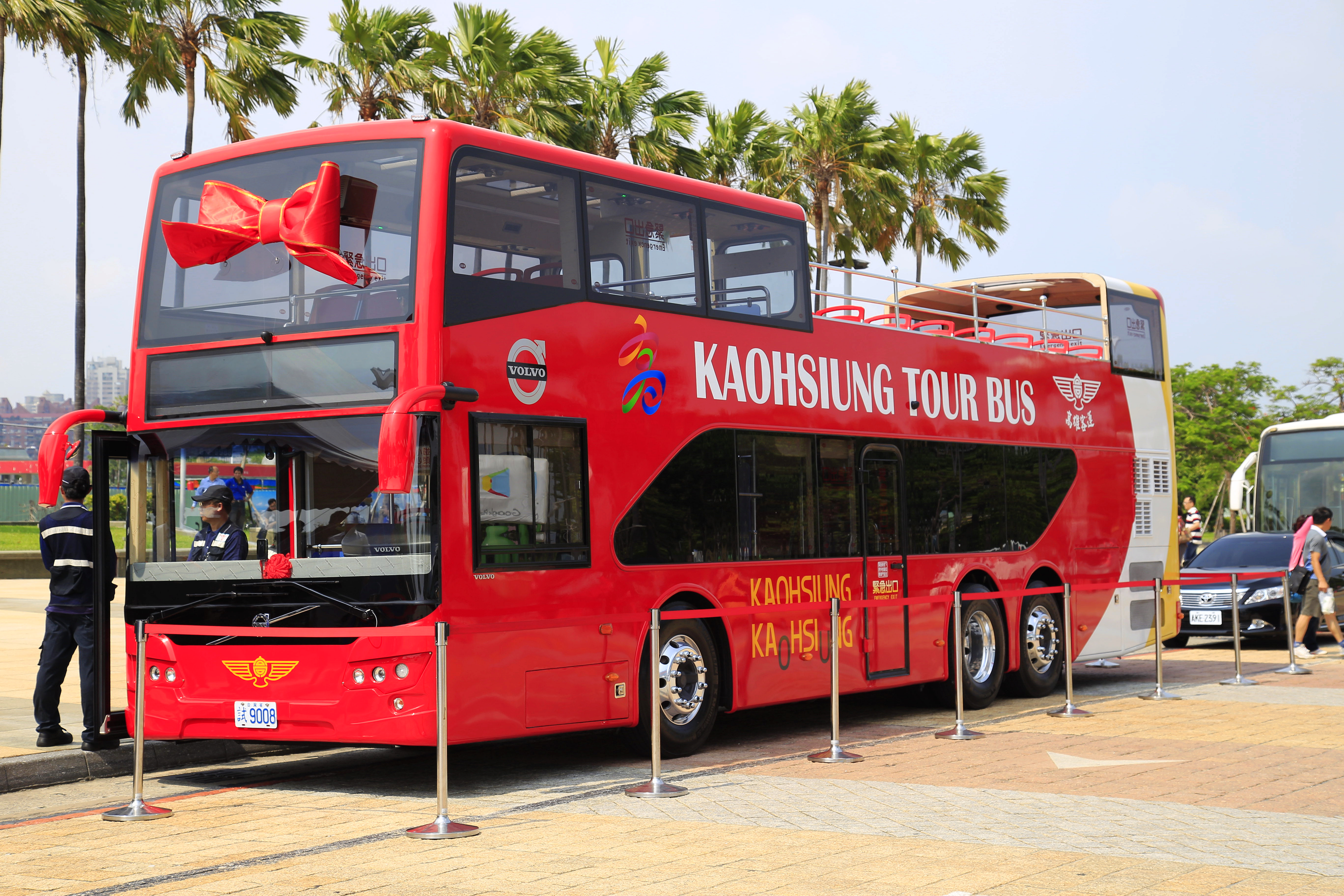
Kaohsiung Transportation Daji bodied Volvo B8RLE double-decker

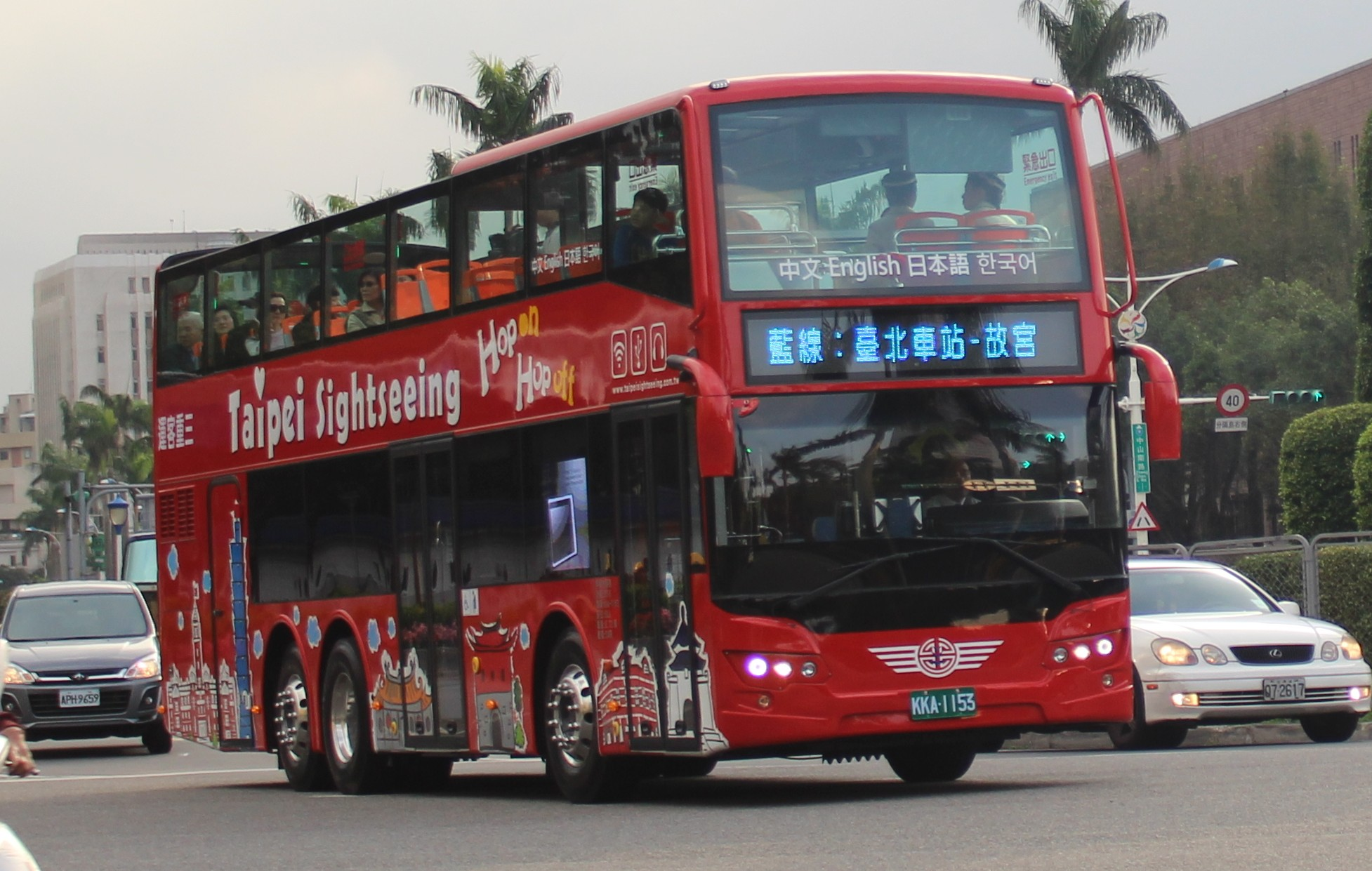
San Chung Bus Daji bodied Volvo B8RLE double-decker

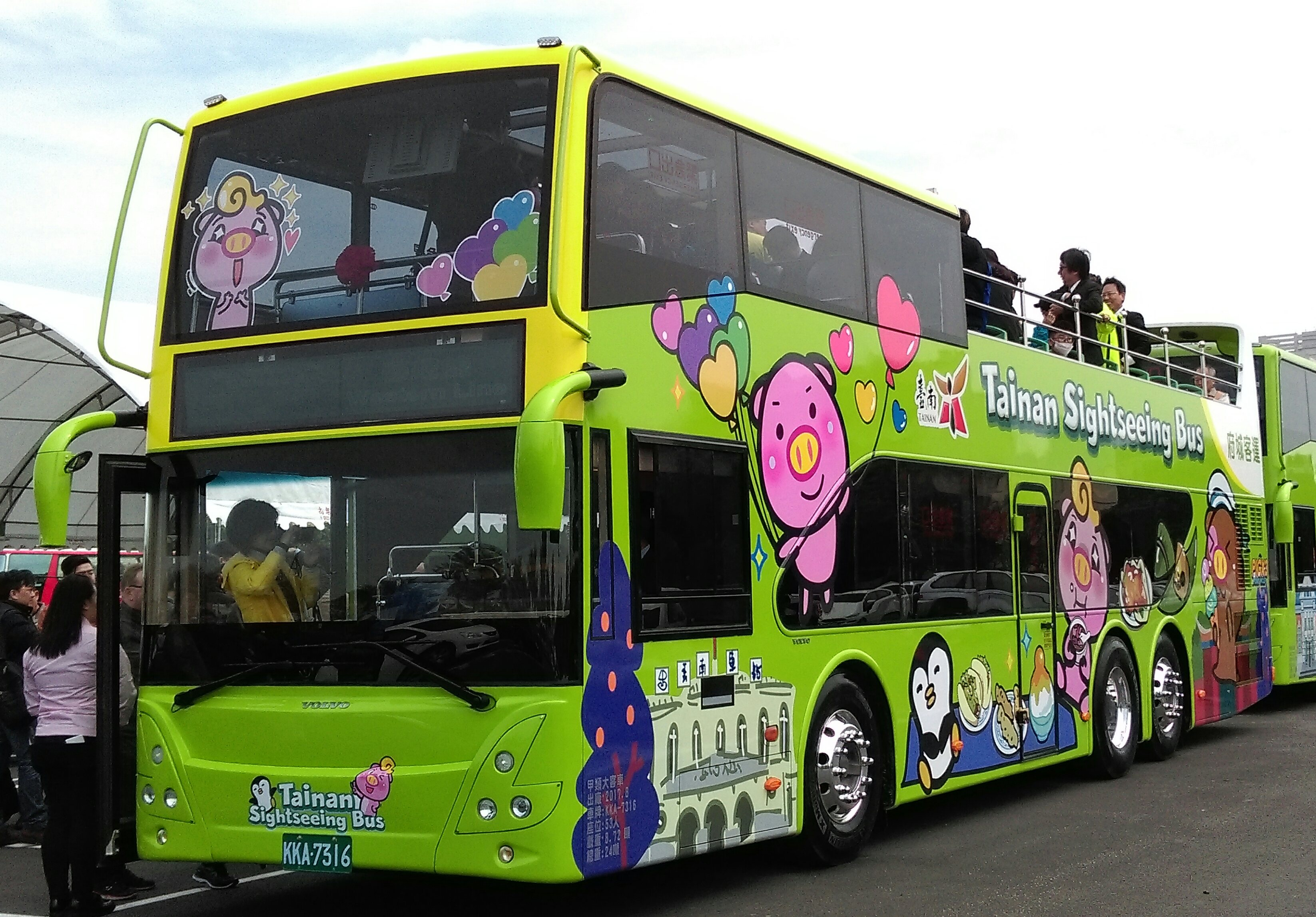
Tainan Bus Daji bodied Volvo B8RLE double-decker

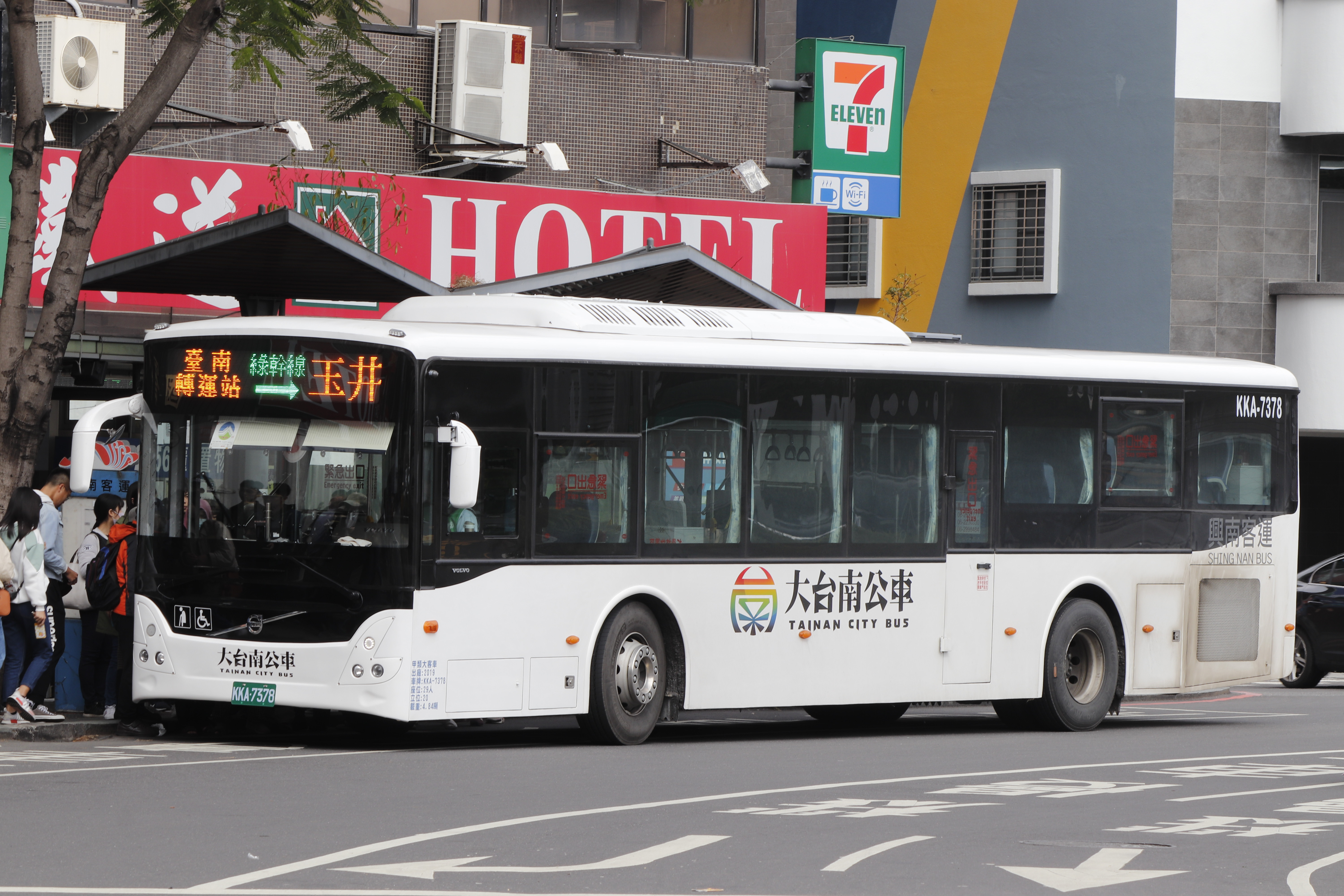
Shing Nan Bus Daji bodied Volvo B8RLE single-deck

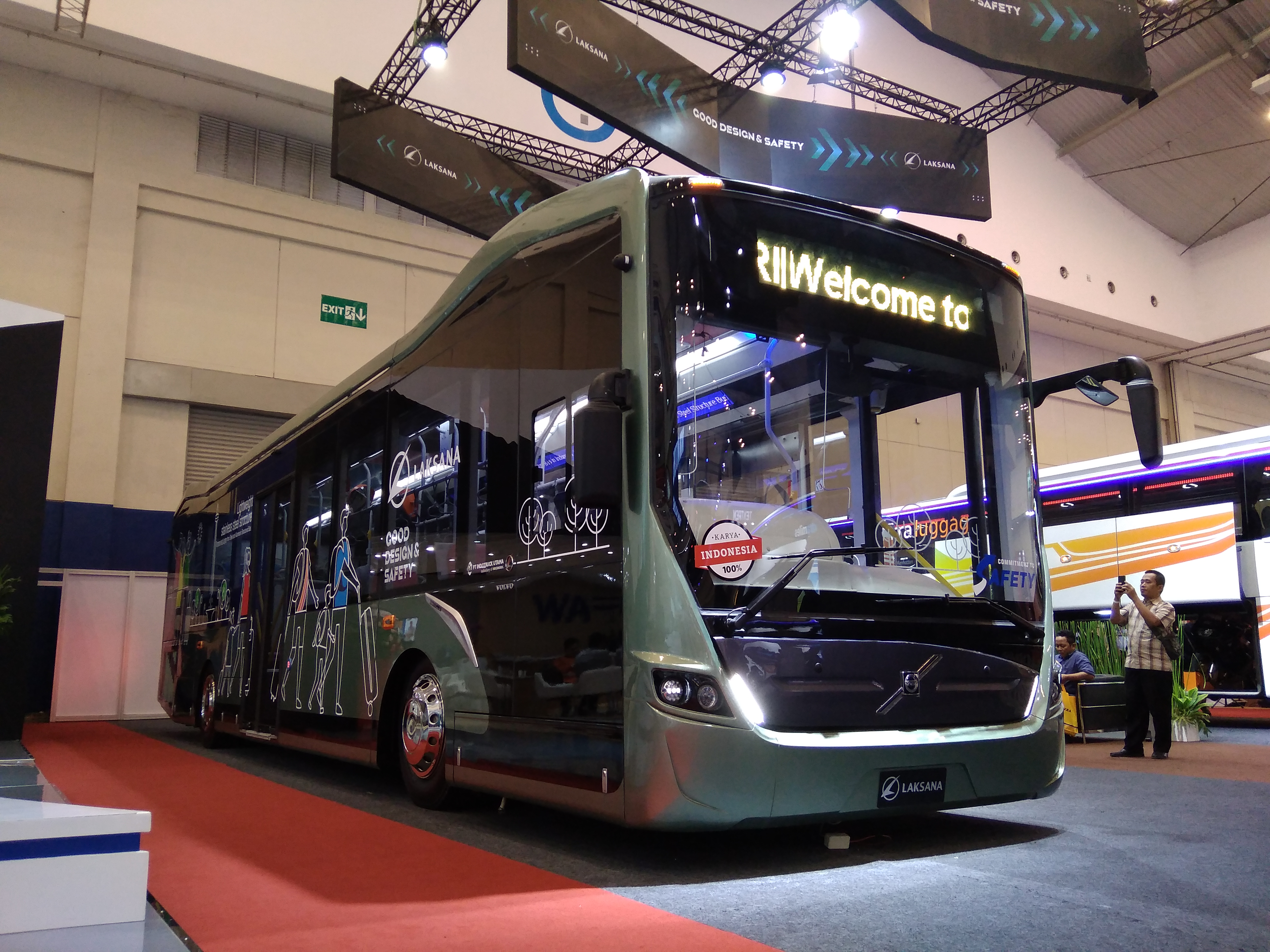
Laksana Cityline3 LE prototype bodied Volvo B8RLE in Indonesia, The Metrotrans buses are coming soon in Jakarta city.

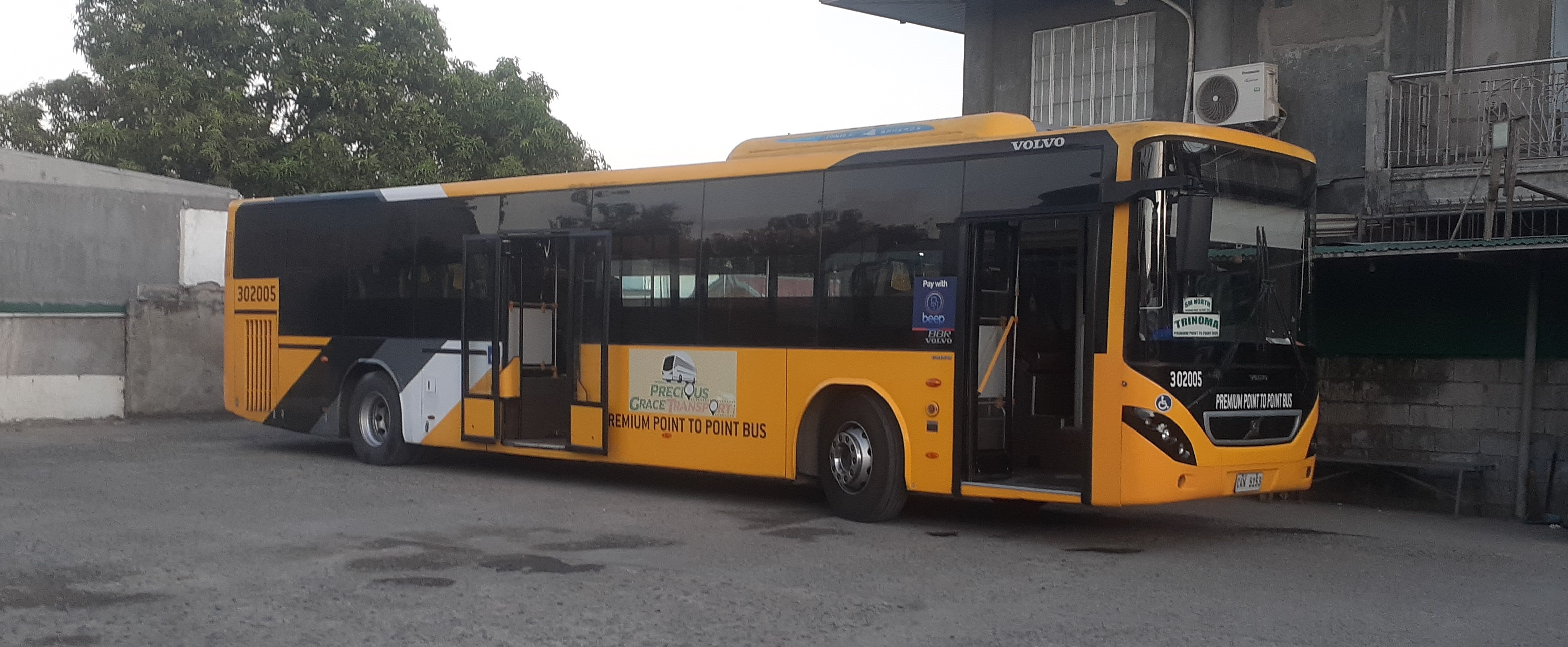
One of the earliest B8RLE in the Philippines, operated by Precious Grace Transport, built by Autodelta Coach Builders, Inc.

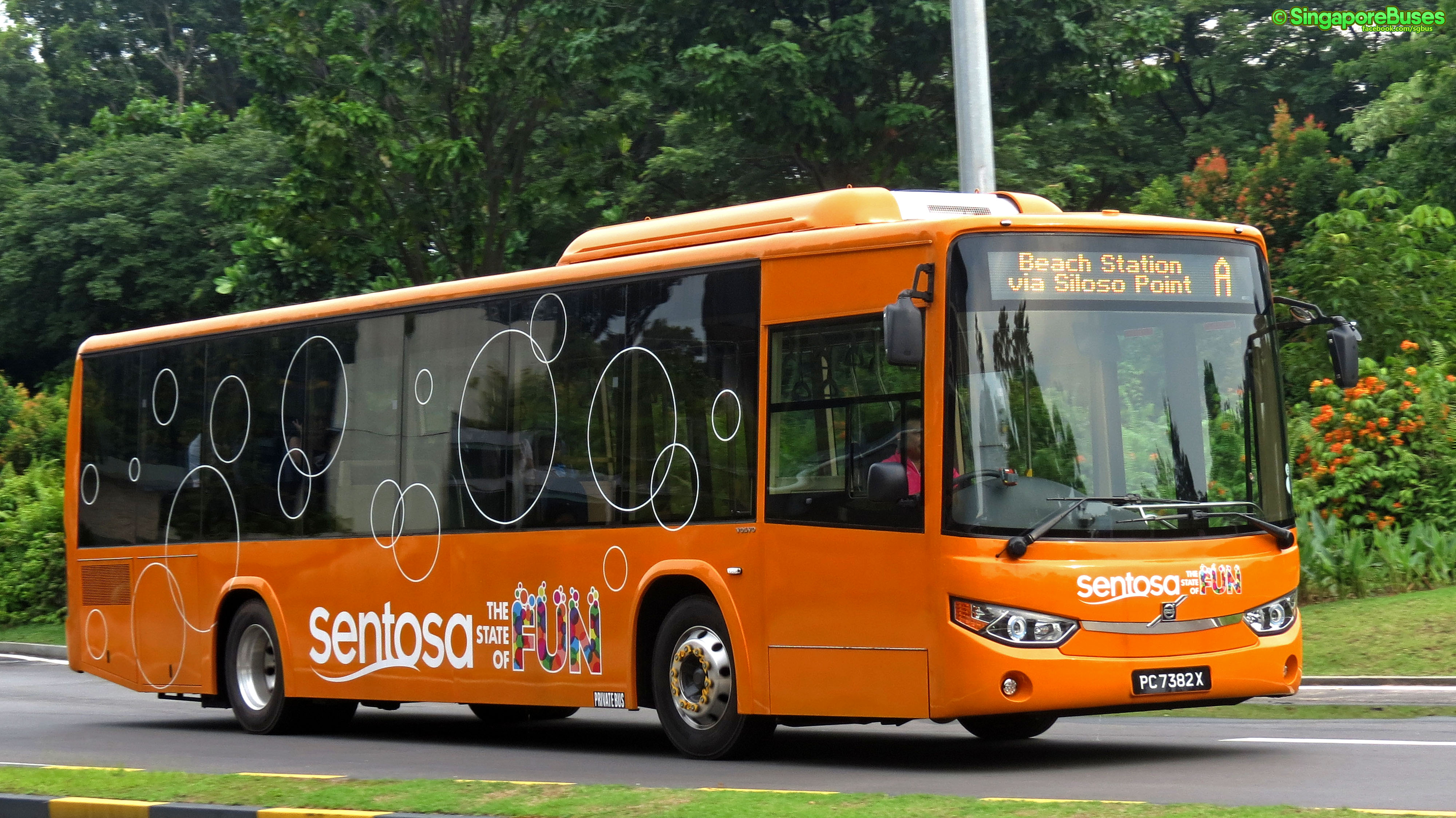
Sentosa Development Corporation Liannex bodied Volvo B8RLE single-deck

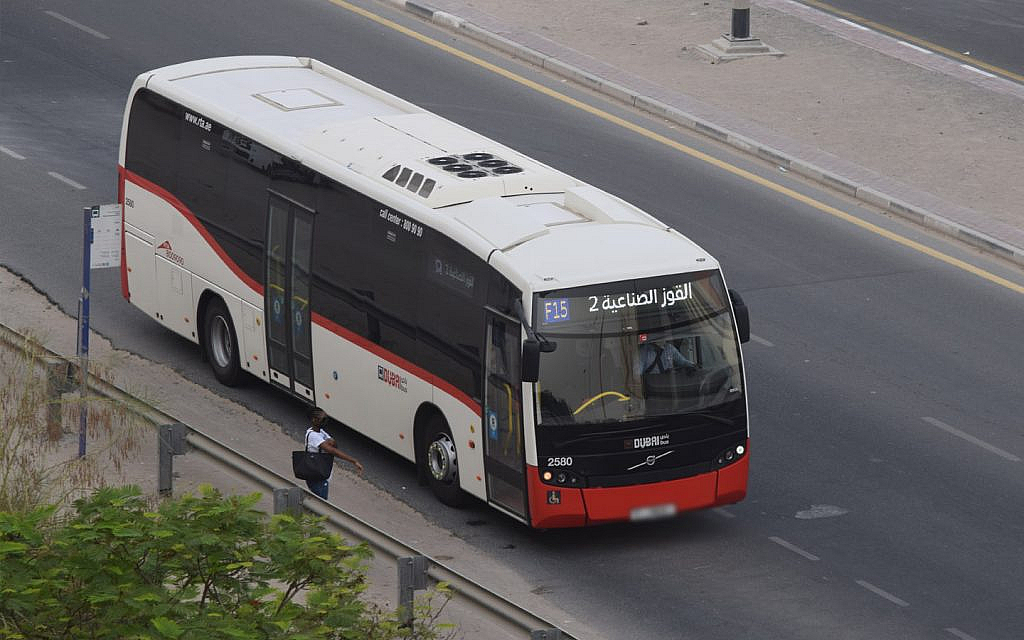
RTA Sunsundegui bodied Volvo B8RLE mainly used for city routes.

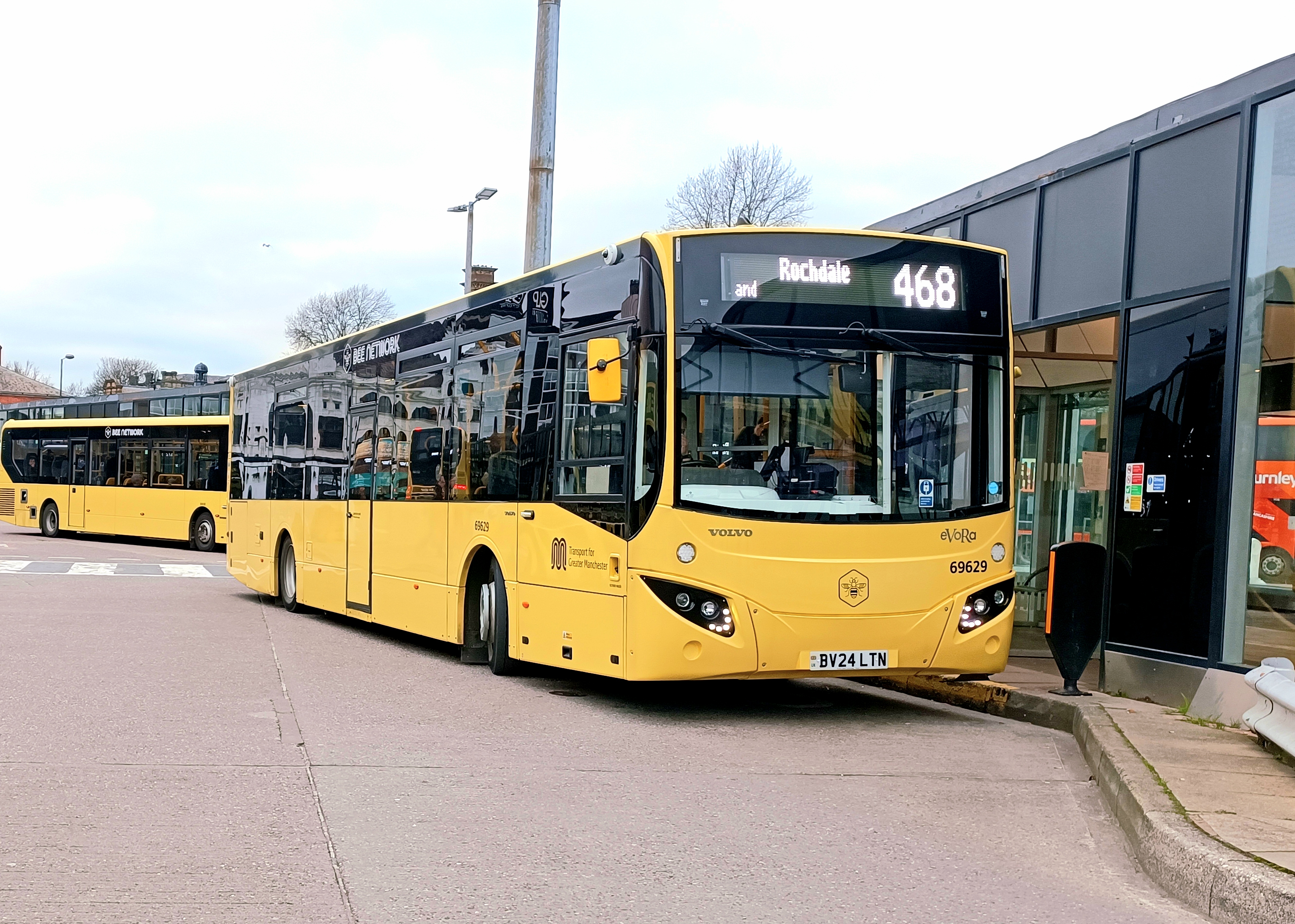
First Greater Manchester MCV Evora bodied Volvo B8RLE

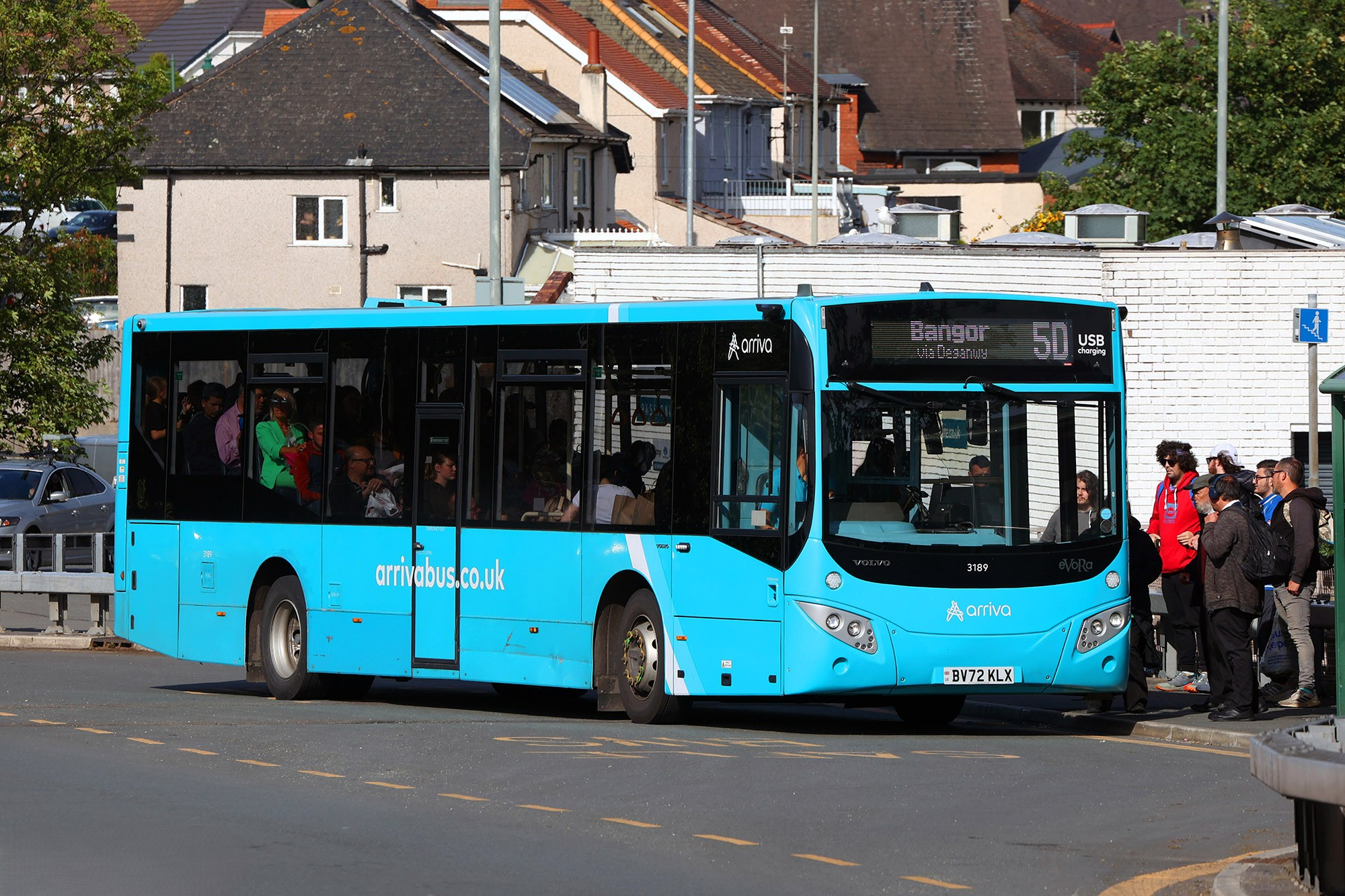
Arriva Wales MCV Evora bodied Volvo B8RLE

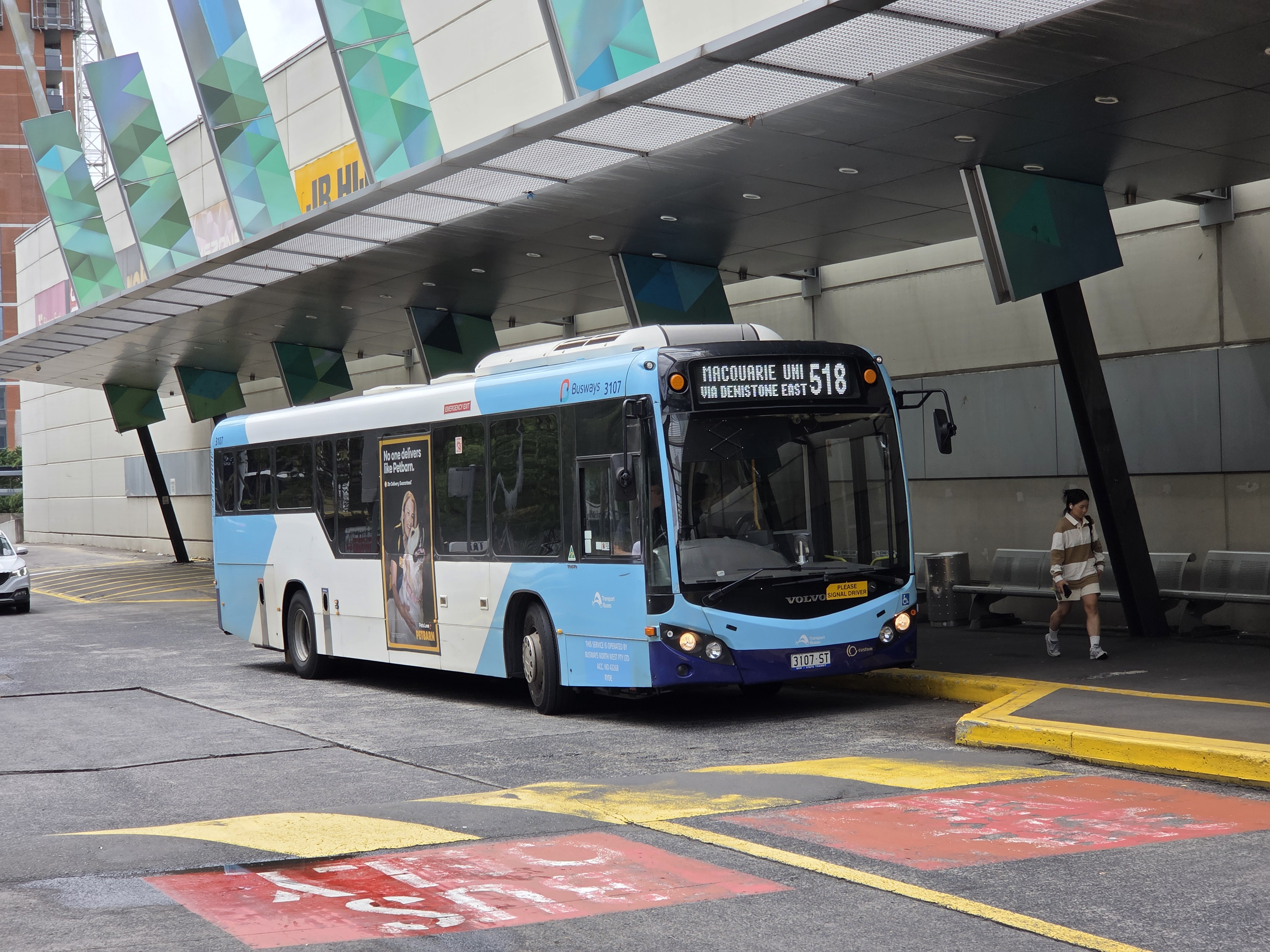
Busways North West Custom CB80 bodied Volvo B8RLE
