= Volvo 8900 =

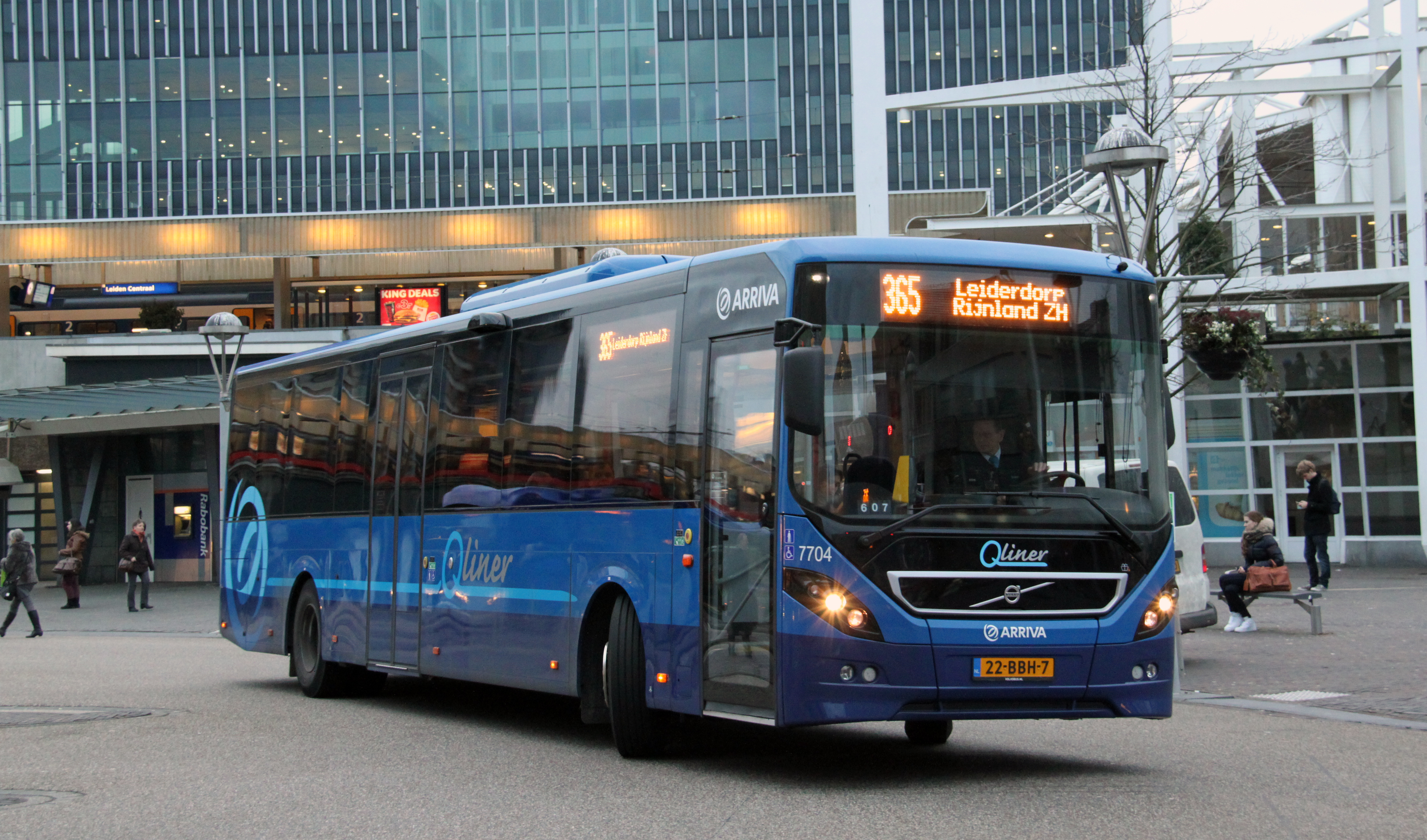
- Qliner Volvo 8900LE from Arriva in Leiden.

Overview
- Manufacturer: Volvo
- Production: 2010–present
- Assembly: Sweden: Säffle; Poland: Wrocław

Body and chassis
- Class: City bus and intercity bus
- Body style: Single-decker intercity bus and city bus
- Doors: 2-3 (1-2-0, 2-2-0, 1-2-1, 2-2-1, etc.)
- Floor type: Step entrance; Low entry
- Chassis: Volvo B7R, B9R, B8R (8900); B7RLE, B9RLE, B8RLE (8900LE); BZR (8900 Electric)

Powertrain
- Engine: Volvo D7E, D9B, D8K
- Transmission: Volvo I-Shift, ZF EcoLife, Voith DIWA

Dimensions
- Length: 8900: 12.2-15.0 metres; 8900LE: 12.0-14.7 metres
- Width: 2.55 metres
- Height: 3.30 metres

Chronology
- Predecessor: Volvo 8500; Volvo 8700; Volvo 8700LE

The Volvo 8900 is a single-decker city bus and intercity bus, first introduced in 2010 as a cross-breed successor to both the aluminium body 8500 and the stainless steel body 8700, taking advantage of both techniques. It is available both with 860 mm step-entrance floor and as the low-entry Volvo 8900LE, and since 2024, is offered on the Volvo BZR chassis as a battery electric bus.

== History ==
The Volvo 8500 built by Volvo Säffle in early May 2010 received a new front facelift. Two months later Volvo officially announced the new 8900 model. The front was the same as the facelifted 8500, but the rest of the bus was new. The 8500 from Säffle would be out of production by summer 2011, while the Wrocław-built 8700 would be gone by new-year 2012.

As the B12B/B12BLE chassis also would be gone by 2012, and the B8R/B8RLE was still not ready, Volvo had to come up with a solution for the tri-axle versions. Because at that time B12B/B12BLE was the only tri-axle chassis offered for city and intercity buses. So with the introduction of 8900/8900LE, Volvo now offered B7RLE 6x2, B9RLE 6x2 and B9R 6x2. It was also offered on standard two-axle B7RLE, B7R and B9R. In the summer of 2013 the first B8R and B8RLE started to appear in low numbers, and from 2014 with Euro VI requirements, no 7s or 9s are offered anymore.

With two plants building the same models, Volvo balanced the production by building only on B7R/B7RLE in Poland, while the B9R/B9RLE and a few B7R/B7RLE were built in Sweden. This was also practical, as the majority of the market for the bigger engines was in Scandinavia. However, Volvo decided to close down the plant in Säffle by the summer of 2013, and all production of the model is now done in Poland.

In November 2024, Volvo announced the launch of the Volvo 8900 Electric, based on the Volvo BZR chassis launched earlier in the year and built with a body manufactured by MCV Bus and Coach. Equipped with a modular battery system giving the bus a battery capacity of 540 kWh, the 8900 Electric is available as both a two or three-axle bus and can be optioned with either one or two electric motors, with a maximum carrying capacity of 110 passengers. Production of the 8900 Electric is expected to commence during 2025.

As with many low-entry bus models, the 8900LE has the seats in the low-floor part of the bus mounted on podiums to get them a bit up from the floor, leaving only the aisle and the wheelchair area at entrance-level. In late 2011, Volvo announced that they would also deliver the 8900LE without these podiums for customers who wanted this. Because the seats were lower, also the window line needed to be lowered for people to be able to see out. Since late 2014, the lowered window line is standard on all new 8900LE.

== Operators ==
=== Norway ===
In Norway the total number of buses, as of November 2014, well over 500, with well over 350 that are 8900 and a bit over 150 that are 8900LE. Major customers are Vy Buss, Nobina Norge, Torghatten Buss TrønderBilene, UniBuss, Firda Billag and Boreal Norge. The Volvo 7900 Hybrid has probably taken a lot of the share that the 8900LE would have had, as full low-floor buses are not generally popular in Norway, but the hybrid are selling quite well due to environmental requirements in the tender competitions.

=== Finland ===
In Finland, there are over 300 of them. Most common type is the 8900LE. Major customers of the 8900LE's are Savonlinja, Pohjolan Liikenne, Nobina Finland, Reissu Ruoti, Länsilinjat, TKL and few others.

Switzerland

In Switzerland, there are much Volvo 8900 LE in the 10.8, 11.2 and 12 meter version at Postauto.
