= Volvo 8500 =

Intercity bus and citybus from Volvo

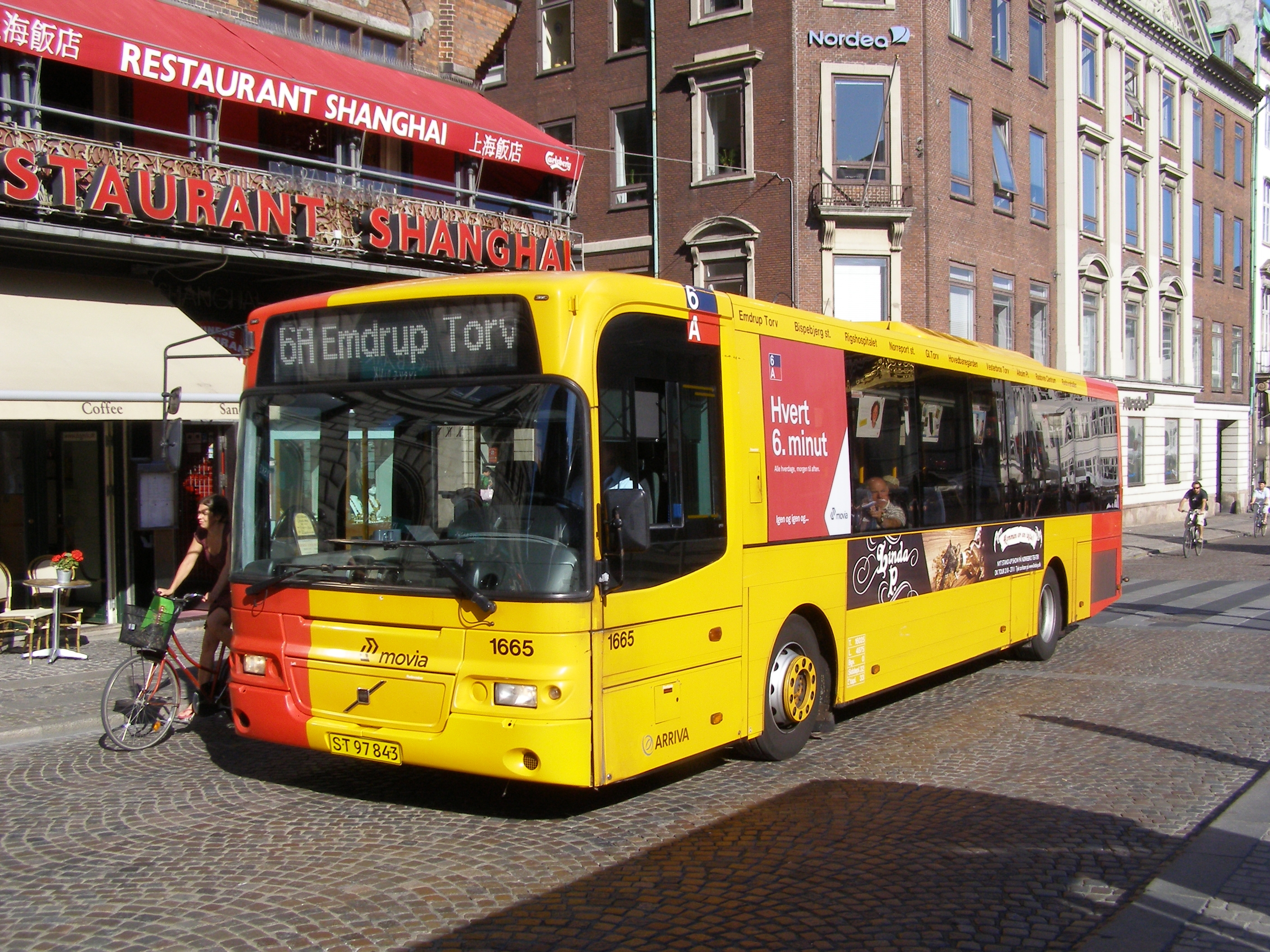
- Aabenraa-built Movia Volvo 8500LE on B12BLE in Copenhagen, operated by Arriva Danmark.

Overview
- Manufacturer: Volvo
- Production: 2001-2011
- Assembly: Aabenraa, Denmark (2001-2004); Säffle, Sweden (2001-2011)

Body and chassis
- Class: Commercial vehicle
- Body style: Single-deck city/intercity bus
- Doors: 2-4
- Floor type: Medium floor Low entry Low floor
- Chassis: Volvo B7R, B12M, B12MA; B10BLE, B7RLE, B12BLE, B9SALE; B9LA, B9SALF

Powertrain
- Engine: Volvo D7C, D7E, D9A, D9B, DH12C, DH12D, DH12E, G9A, GH10C

Dimensions
- Width: 2.55 metres

Chronology
- Predecessor: Säffle 2000NL; Säffle 5000
- Successor: Volvo 8900

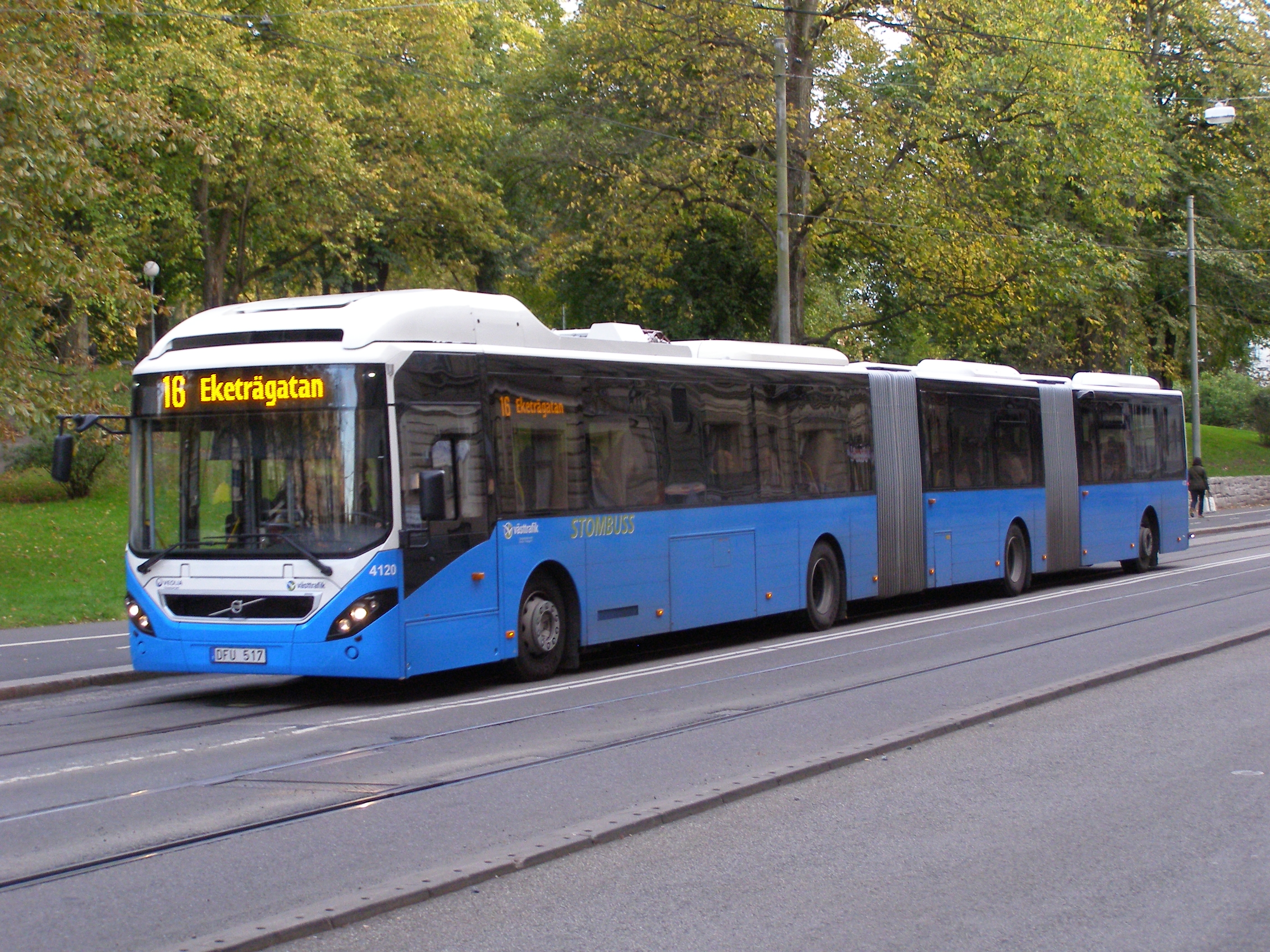
Facelifted Volvo 7500 Bi-Artic in Gothenburg.

The Volvo 8500 was an aluminium body single-deck city/intercity bus manufactured by Volvo between 2001 and 2011. It was available with medium floor as two-axle (B7R, B12M), tri-axle (B12M) and the articulated 8500A (B12MA). As the low-entry Volvo 8700LE as two-axle (B7RLE, B12BLE), tri-axle (B12BLE) and the articulate 8500LEA (B9SALE). From 2005 it was also available as the fully low floor Volvo 7500 (B9LA, B9SALF), which even came in a bi-articulated version. In the early years, the 8500LE was available with CNG on the B10BLE chassis. Later, CNG was only available on the 7500.

In May 2010 the models received a facelift, which was the front of its 2011-successor, the 8900. The 7500 found its successor in the 7900, but the bi-articulated version was discontinued.

The main markets were Denmark and Sweden, but some were also sold in the other Northern European countries like Estonia, and some of the Swede buses got a second life at developing countries such as Albania in the last years. The 7500 never found any buyers outside Sweden, even if the bi-artics were tested in several cities outside Sweden up through the years.
