= Volvo B9RLE =

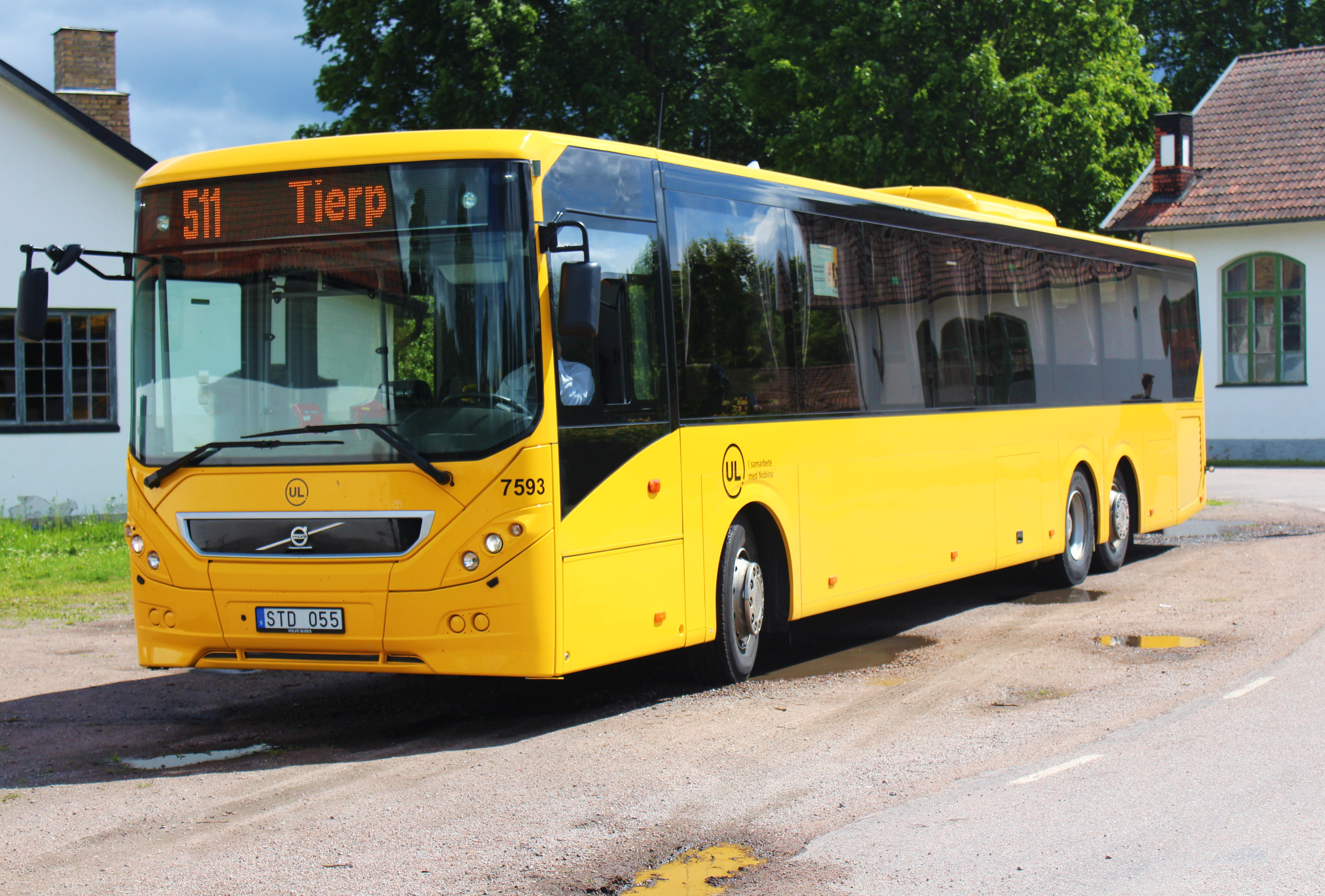

Overview
- Manufacturer: Volvo
- Production: 2010–2013
- Assembly: Sweden

Body and chassis
- Class: Bus chassis
- Body style: Single-decker bus Double-decker bus Open-top double-decker bus
- Floor type: Low entry

Powertrain
- Engine: Volvo D9B
- Capacity: 55 to 60 single deck
- Power output: 380 bhp
- Transmission: Volvo I-Shift

Dimensions
- Length: 12.4–14.9 m (bodied)
- Width: 2.55 m (bodied)

Chronology
- Predecessor: Volvo B12BLE
- Successor: Volvo B8RLE

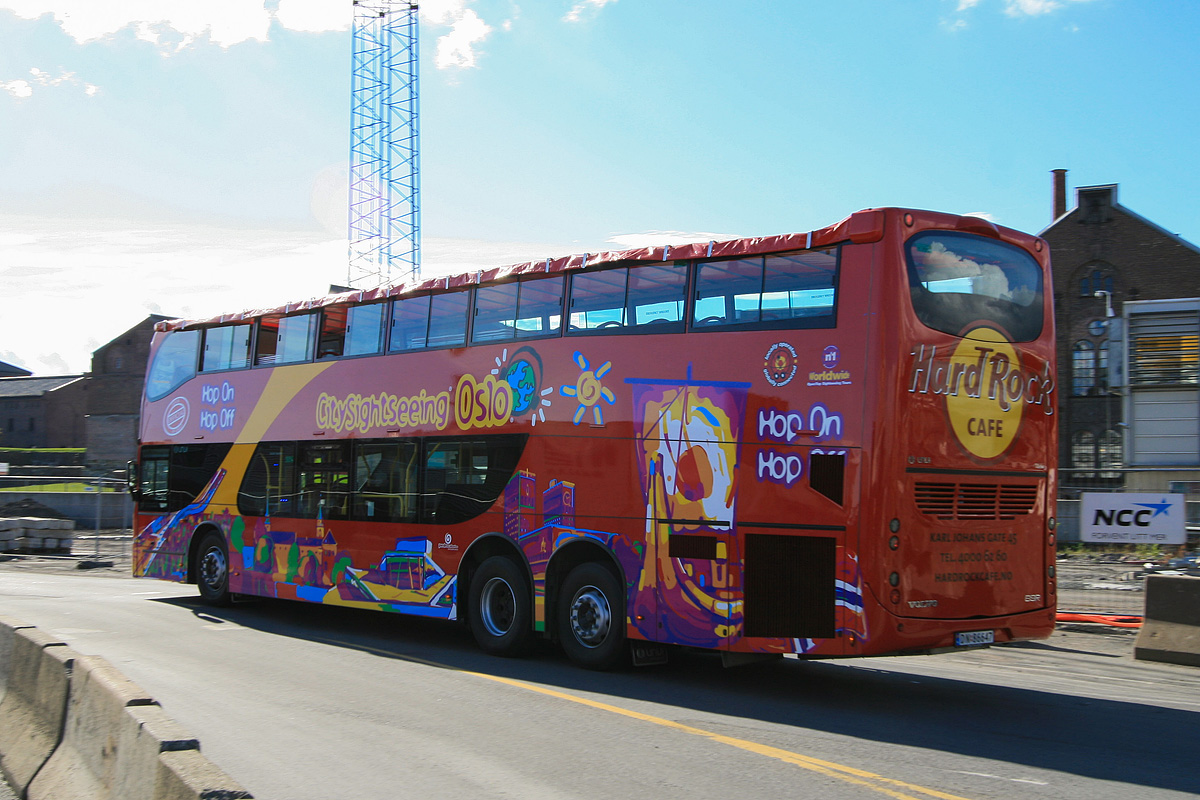
City Sightseeing Oslo Unvi Urbis 2.5 DD-bodied B9RLE 6x2 operated by HMK.

The Volvo B9RLE is a 9.4-litre engined tri-axle low-entry single-decker bus and double-decker bus chassis manufactured by Volvo between 2010 and 2013. The double-decker was available in either closed top or open top form. It was introduced as an interim replacement for the soon to be discontinued B12BLE in the short gap of years before they had the Euro VI compliant B8RLE ready. At the same time they introduced a tri-axle variant of the B7RLE, but in Volvo's home markets the 290 bhp that the D7E produces is considered insufficient for a 15-metre bus.

The most likely reason for introducing the B9RLE a whole year before the end of production for the B12BLE was for the introduction of the first prototypes of the Volvo 8900LE in late 2010, which was also the body that most B9RLE received. Some were also bodied as open top double-decker sightseeing buses with the Unvi Urbis 2.5 DD body.

In Sweden a total of 145 were built as 8900LE low-entry city buses to various customers, like Nettbuss and Nobina Sverige, and 7 Unvi-bodied sightseeing buses. In Norway Boreal Transport received 10 as 8900LE for Stavanger and Nobina Norge received 27 (including a prototype from 2010) for Tromsø. Also a Unvi-bodied open top sightseeing bus was delivered to Oslo.

== Engines ==
D9B, 9364 cc, in-line 6 cyl. turbodiesel (2010–2013)

- D9B380 – 280 kW (380 bhp), 1700 N·m, Euro V
