= Volvo 8700 =

Intercity bus and citybus from Volvo

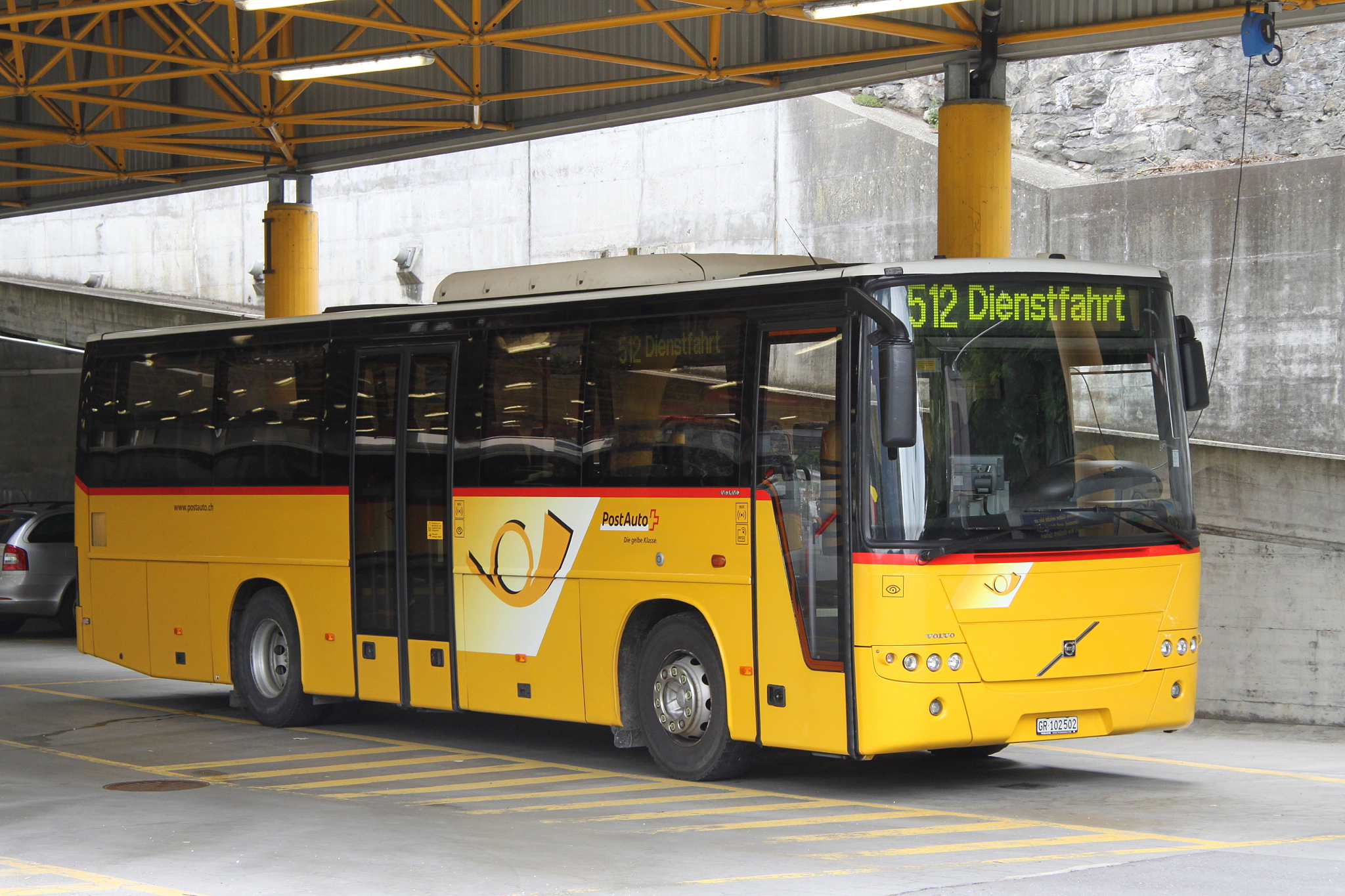
- Volvo 8700 on B12B in Thusis, Switzerland.

Overview
- Manufacturer: Volvo
- Production: 2002–2011
- Assembly: Tampere, Finland (2002–2008); Wrocław, Poland (2002–2011)

Body and chassis
- Class: Bus chassis
- Body style: Single-decker city bus Single-decker intercity bus
- Doors: 2-3 (1-2-0, 2-2-0, 1-2-1, 2-2-1, etc.)
- Floor type: Medium floor Low entry
- Chassis: Volvo B7R, B12B, B12M; B7RLE, B12BLE

Powertrain
- Engine: Volvo D7C, D7E, DH12D, DH12E
- Transmission: I-Shift, ZF, Voith GmbH

Dimensions
- Length: 12.0 metres, 14.5 metres or 18.0 metres
- Width: 2.55 metres
- Height: 3.00 metres or 3.14 metres

Chronology
- Predecessor: Carrus Vega (Volvo B10-400, Volvo 7250)
- Successor: Volvo 8900

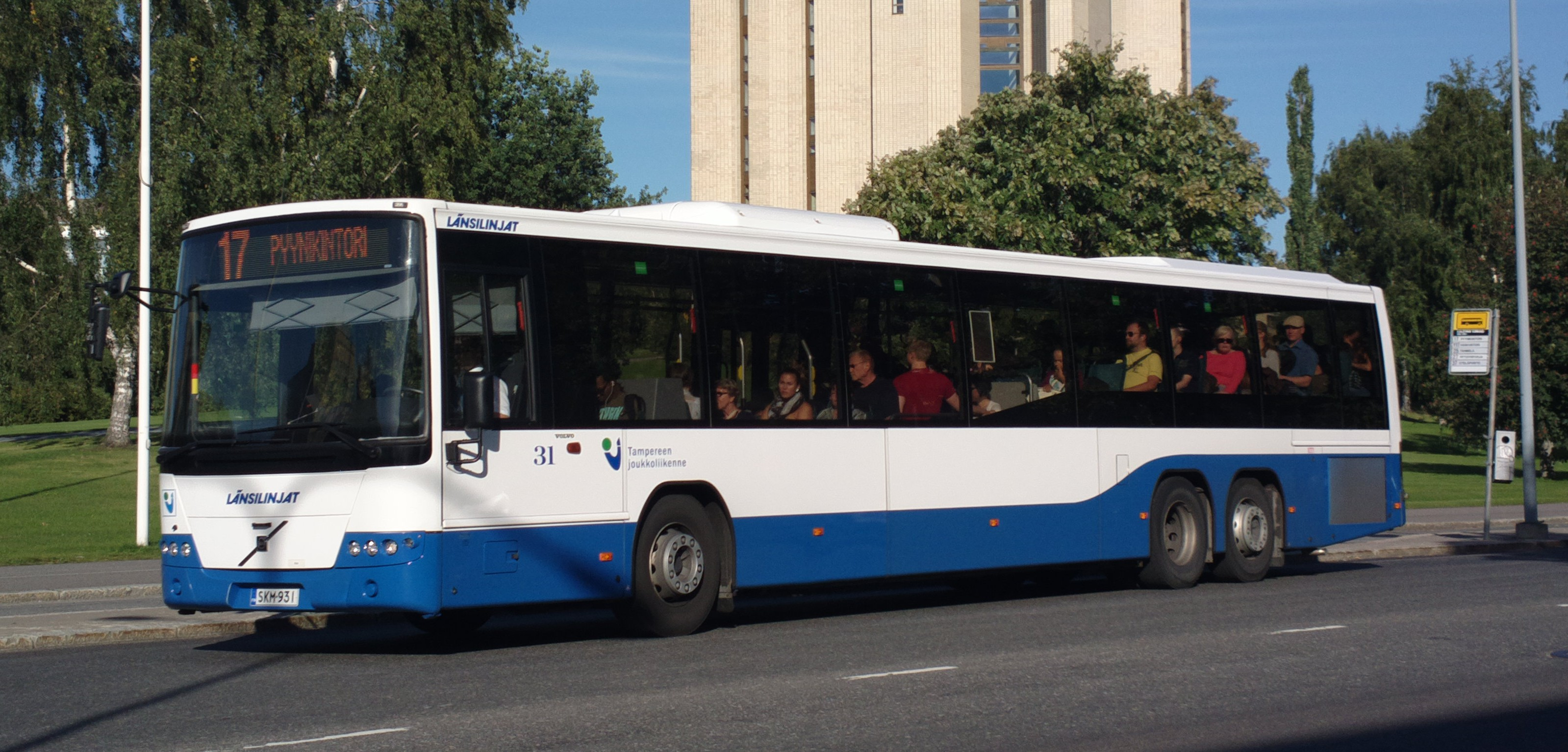
Volvo 8700LE on Volvo B12BLE 6x2 in Tampere.

The Volvo 8700 is a single-decker city and single-decker intercity bus from Volvo manufactured between 2002 and 2011. It was available both with medium floor and as the low-entry Volvo 8700LE, which was even built as the articulated Volvo 8700LEA on a B12BLEA chassis. It was also available as a coach, and even some were delivered with a toilet.

As a successor to the Carrus Vega, which was also built and sold as Volvo B10-400 and Volvo 7250 in Germany and Poland, the main difference was that it was built on the Volvo TX platform. The exterior was just as a simple facelift from the old model. The medium floor 8700 was available on B7R, B12B and B12M chassis, with all except the B7R available as a tri-axle bus. The 8700LE was available on B7RLE and B12BLE, with only the B12BLE as a tri-axle bus.

In 2011 it was succeeded by the 8900.

In Norway a total of 1300 buses were delivered, with the 8700 and 8700LE having an almost equal share.
