= KD Transportation Group =

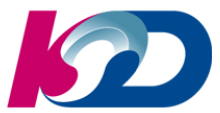
- Native name: KD운송그룹
- Industry: Public transport
- Founded: Gyeonggi Express (1930); Daewon Express (1954); Uijeongbu, South Korea (1972)
- Founder: Heo Myeong-hoi
- Headquarters: Seoul, South Korea
- Area served: South Korea
- Key people: Heo Myeong-hoi, Heo Sang-jun, Kim seung-han
- Services: Bus
- Revenue: ▲737,000,000,000 South Korean won (690,204,158 USD) (2009)
- Owner: Heo Sang Jun
- Number of employees: 9290
- Website: buspia.co.kr (in Korean)

The KD Transportation group (Korean: KD운송그룹) is a transportation company based on Daewon Passenger Traffic, which mainly does bus transportation. The company focuses on intercity bus, airport bus, transit bus, tour bus service, and is the biggest bus company in South Korea. This company's all airport bus, intercity bus, tour bus color is Purple.

== Gallery ==
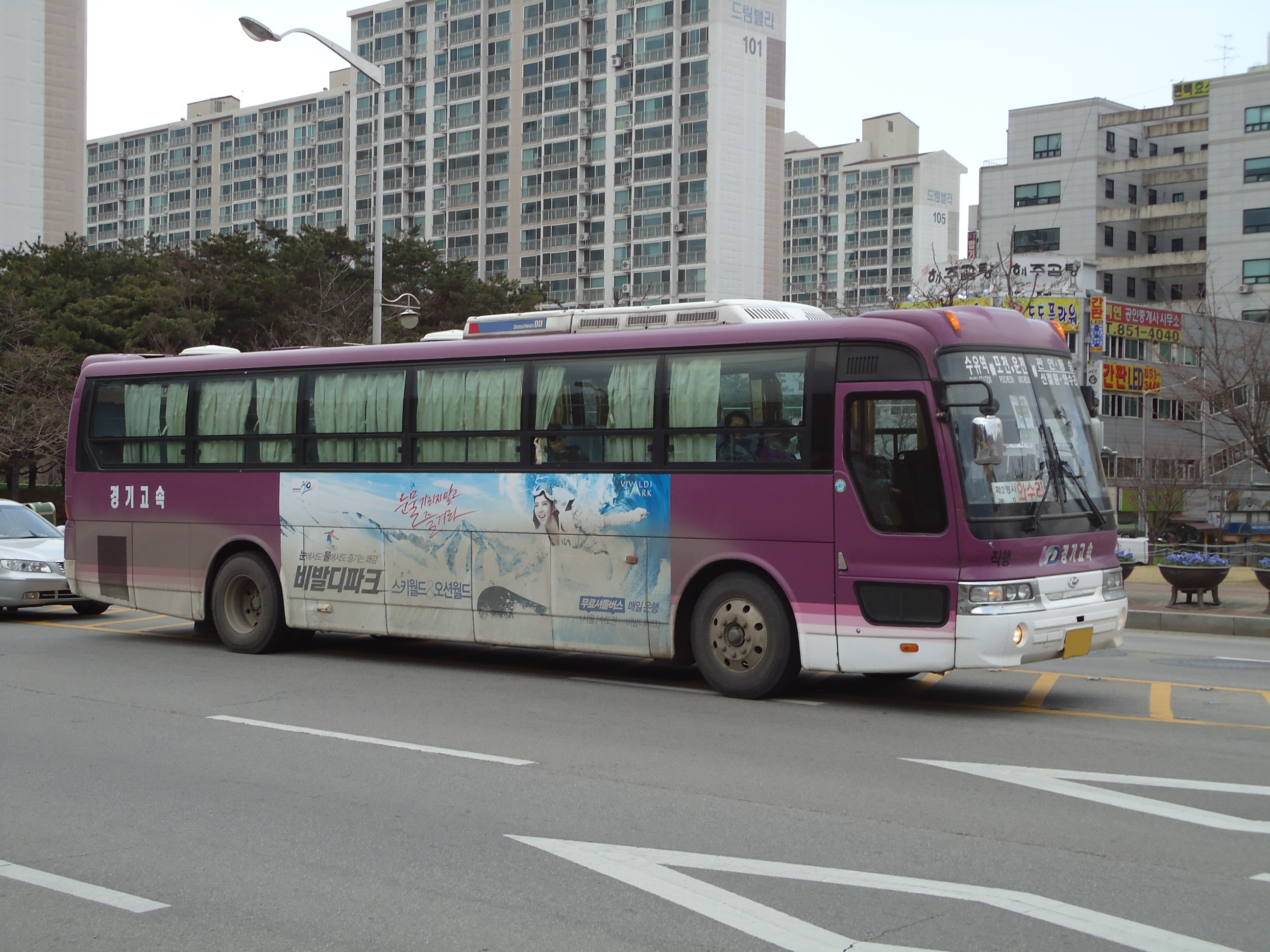

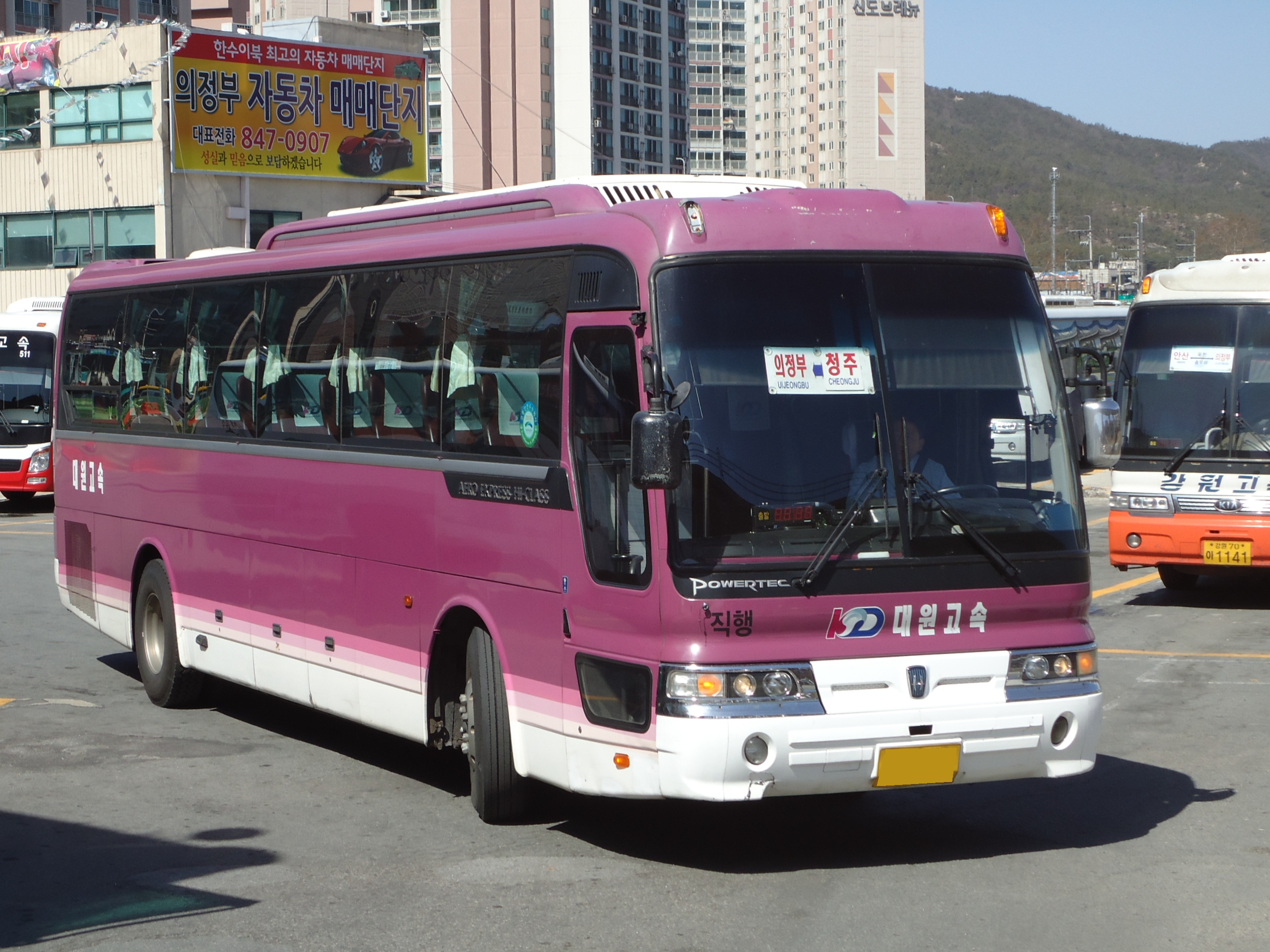

== Subsidiary ==
- Kyeonggi Express
- Daewon Express
- Samheung Express
