= Volvo B12BLE =

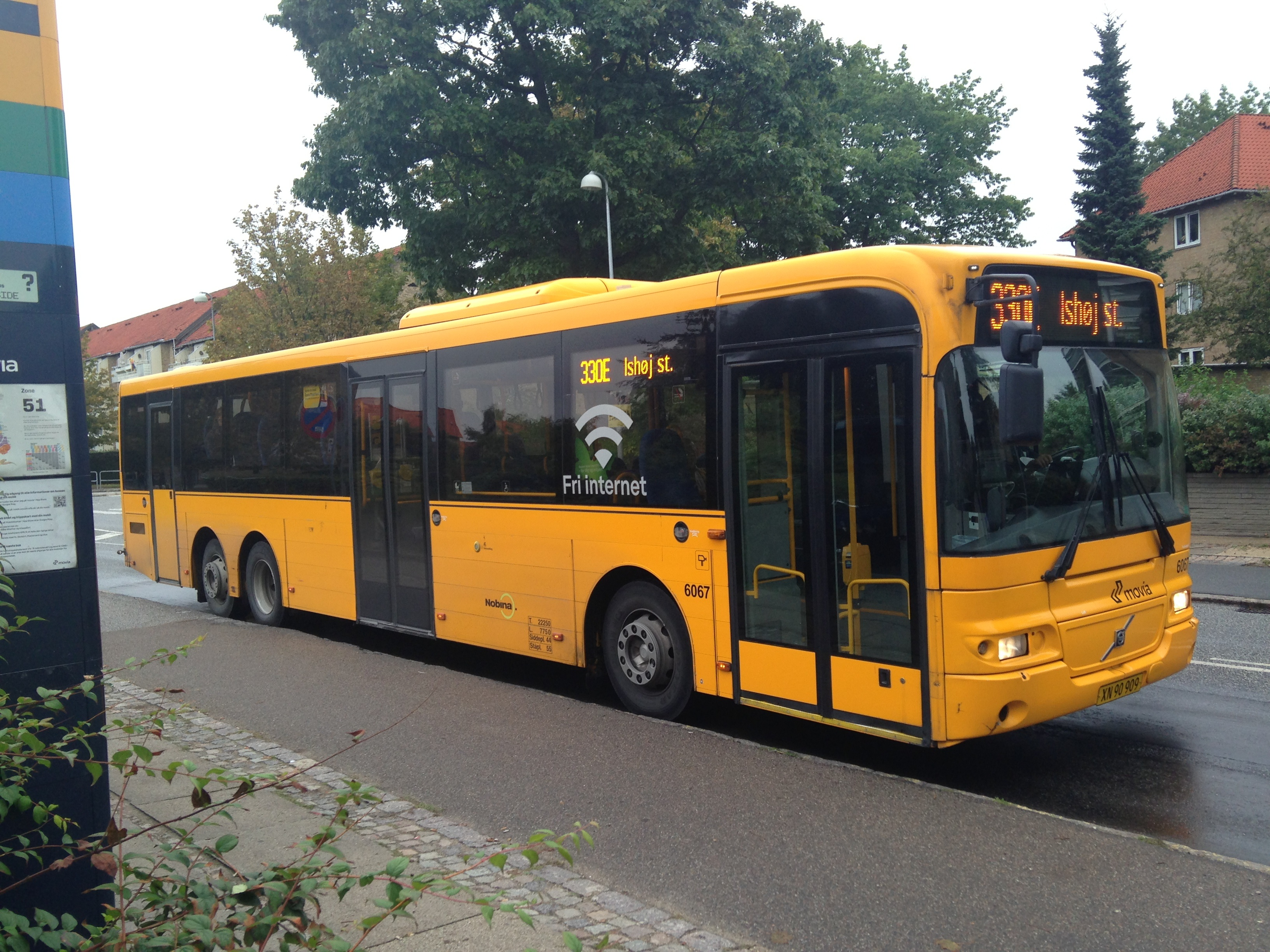
- Nobina Volvo B12BLE with Volvo Säffle 8500LE integral body.

Overview
- Manufacturer: Volvo Buses
- Production: 2001-2013

Body and chassis
- Doors: 2-3 (1-2-0, 2-2-0, 1-2-1, 2-2-1, etc.)
- Floor type: Low floor/Low entry

Powertrain
- Engine: Volvo DH12D/DH12E
- Capacity: 41 to 67 seated
- Power output: 340hp 1700Nm
- Transmission: ZF 5HP552C, 6HP552C, 5HP602C, 6HP602C, 6HP604C; Voith D864.4, D864.5; Volvo I-Shift AT2412C

Dimensions
- Length: 12.0m, 12.8m, 13.7m, 14.5m and 18.0m

Chronology
- Predecessor: Volvo B10BLE
- Successor: Volvo B9RLE

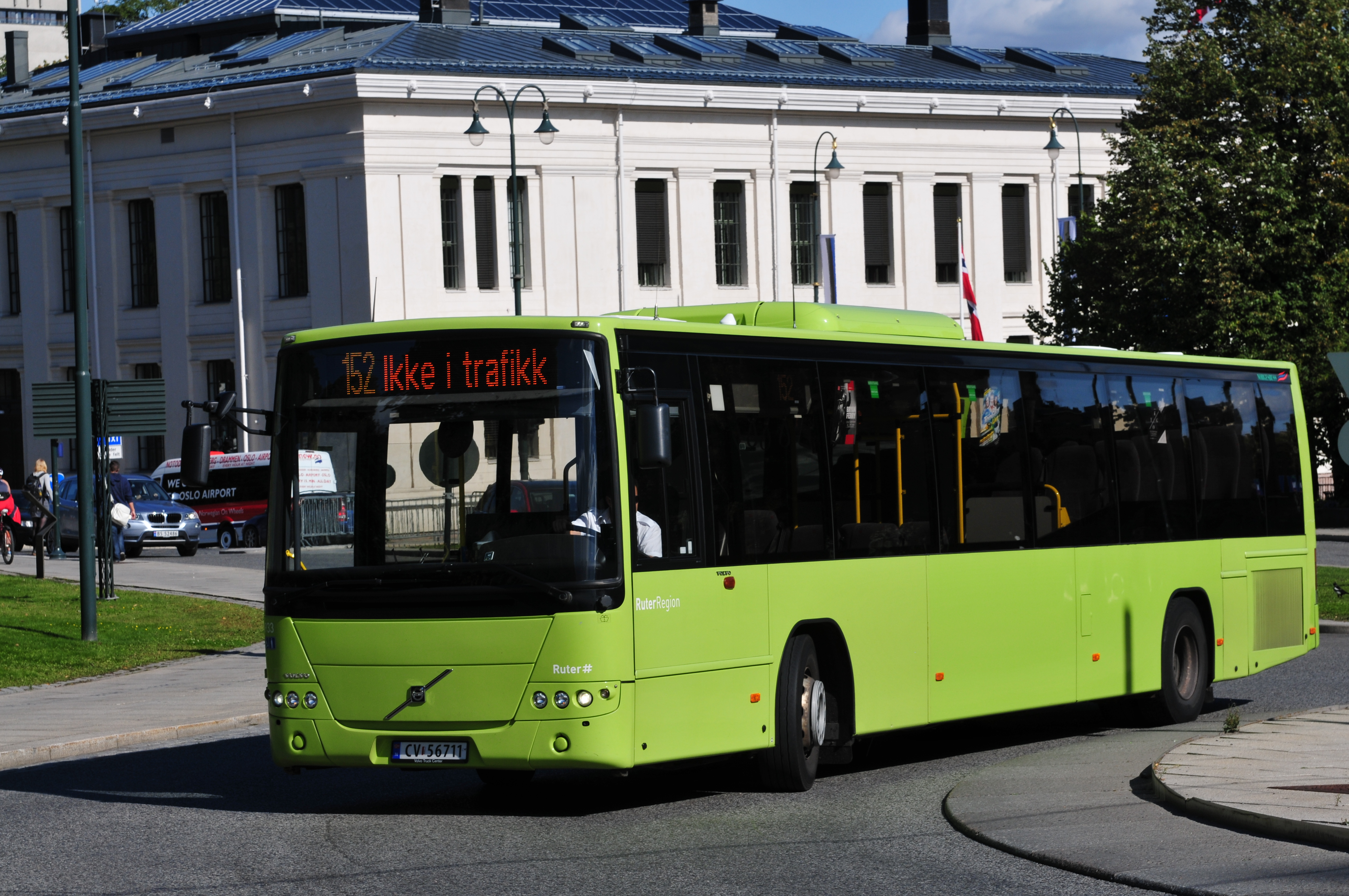
Norgesbuss Volvo B12BLE with Volvo 8700LE body in Oslo, Norway

The Volvo B12BLE is a low-entry city and suburban bus chassis launched in 2001 with a rear-mounted transverse engine. It superseded the Volvo B10BLE and is used as a base for single-decker buses largely in Continental Europe and the Asia-Pacific regions. The B12BLE was available in the Continental Europe and Asia-Pacific markets, while the B12BLEA was largely built for Australia only.

The B12BLE features the 12-litre Volvo DH12 engine, which is based on the D12 engine from Volvo FH trucks. The DH12D engine meets Euro 3 emission level, and DH12E meets levels 4 and 5 with SCR technology. The engine is mounted horizontally, as it was in the B10BLE. The radiator is mounted at the rear on the right-hand side.

From its launch in 2001 until 2005, it was available with the Euro 3 DH12D engine and ZF Ecomat2 & Voith D864.3E automatic transmissions. From 2004/2005, the B12BLE was available with an updated electrical system. Available transmissions were 6-speed ZF 6HP602C, Voith DIWA864.3E and the Volvo I-Shift

In 2006 the chassis was updated with DH12E engine and ZF Ecomat4 / Voith D864.5 transmissions to meet Euro 4 & 5 emission standards.

The B12BLE was also available in the articulated form since 2005, which is known as the B12BLEA chassis. The B12BLE can be available in the rigid, tri-axle and articulated form.

The B12BLE is also available as a complete integral bus in Europe - the Volvo 8500LE and Volvo 8700LE.

In 2011, the Volvo B12BLE was superseded by the Volvo B9RLE and subsequently the Volvo B8RLE.

== Australia ==
Numerous public transport operators in Australia operate many B12BLE buses, either in the Euro III or Euro IV and Euro V guises. Most of the B12BLE chassis that go to Australia are bodied by Australian companies such as Custom Coaches, Volgren, and Bustech.

The Volvo B12BLEA was conceptualized for the State Transit Authority (STA) of Sydney, Australia because the B7LA was too underpowered for many of Sydney's bus routes due to the hilly terrain. STA placed an order for 80 B12BLEA articulated buses, and they were assembled with Custom Coaches bodywork. The world's first B12BLEA entered service with STA in late 2005, under the fleet number 1661 (m/o 1661). The buses are powered by the 12-litre Volvo DH12 diesel engine with 6-speed ZF 6HP602C and 6HP604C automatic transmission.

STA also ordered additional B12BLEA's in the Volgren CR228L body. The Volgren bodied buses were mostly seen running the high capacity Metrobus services. Most of the buses are built in Volgren's Tomago factory while the rest were built in Dandenong.

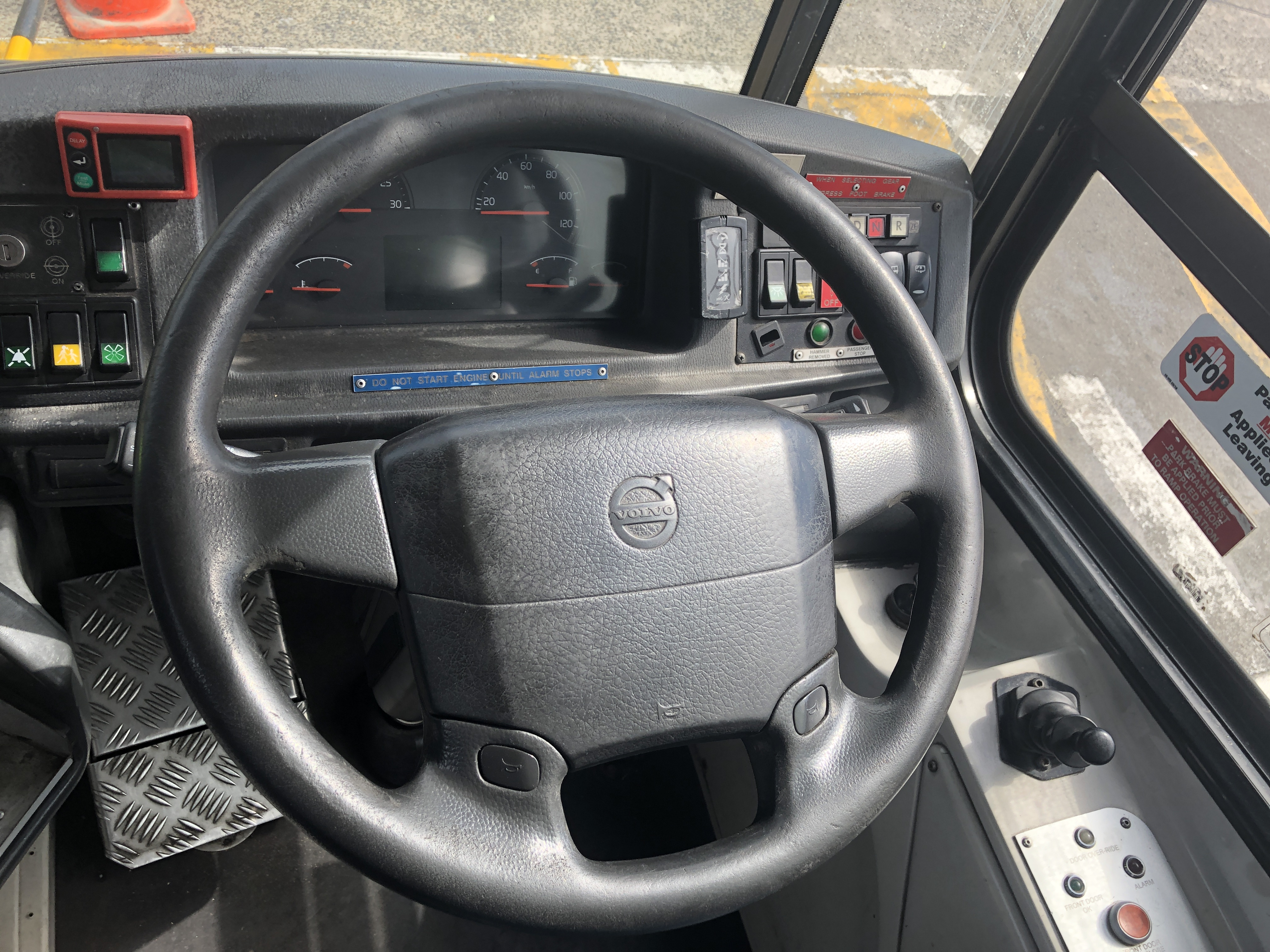
Australian Volvo B12BLE Dashboard

The Volvo B12BLE also come in a 12.5m configuration in Custom Coaches bodied CB60 and CB60 Evo 2 bodies. Volgren 12.5m variants were also ordered in both 12.5m and 14.5m bodies both Euro 5 compliant. The 12.5m Custom Coaches CB60 are Euro 3 compliant while the newer CB60 Evo 2 bodied buses are Euro 5 compliant.

In 2011, Transperth ordered 30 Volvo B12BLEAs. They were to be assembled with Volgren CR228L bodywork.

Transport for Brisbane purchased 119 B12BLEs in 2011 (with a further 30 in 2013), all of them are tri-axle. These are used on several high-frequency bus routes, mostly on the South East Busway. Transport for Brisbane were also the last bus operator in the world to order B12BLEs.

=== B12BLE ===
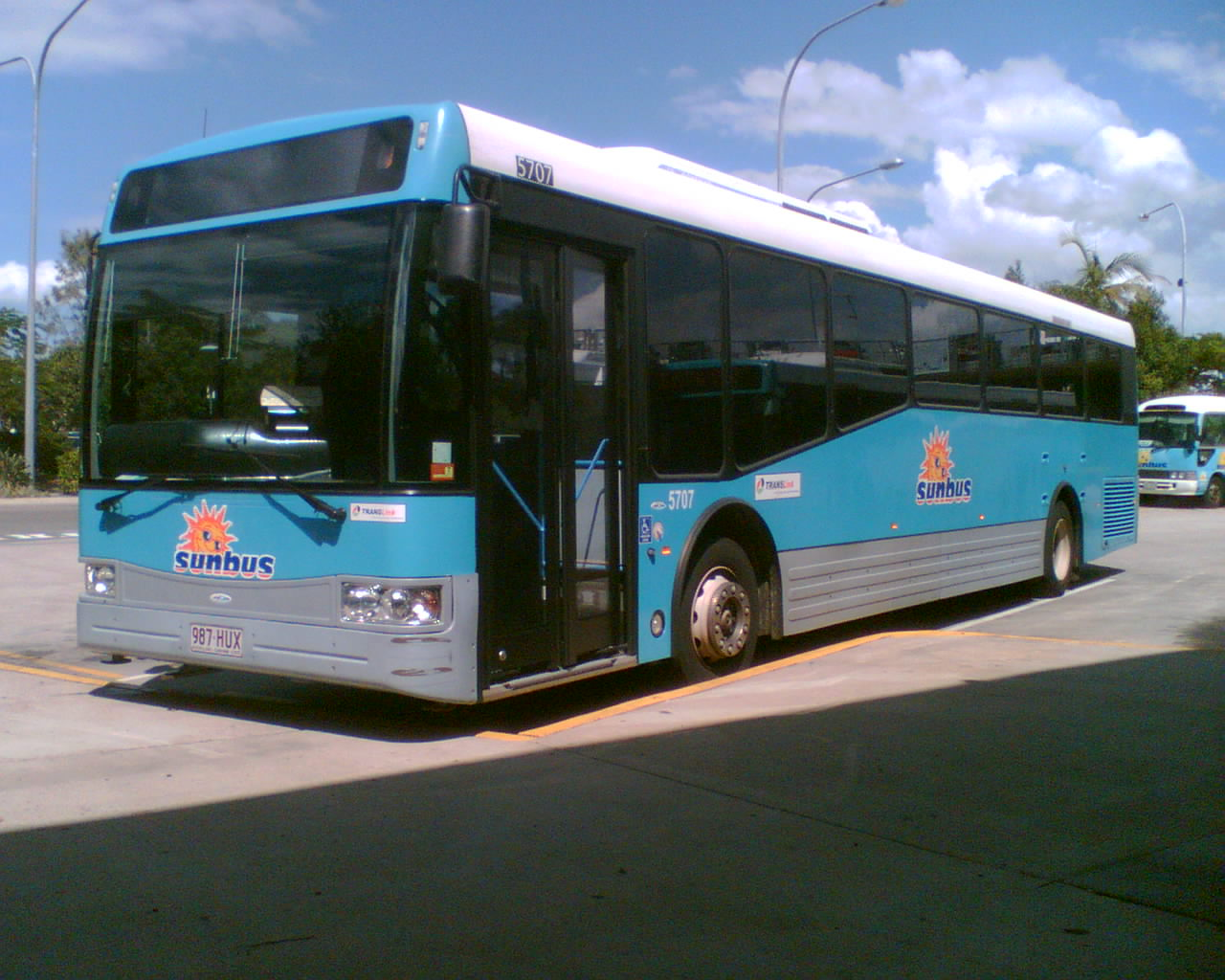
Sunbus Bustech VST bodied Volvo B12BLE

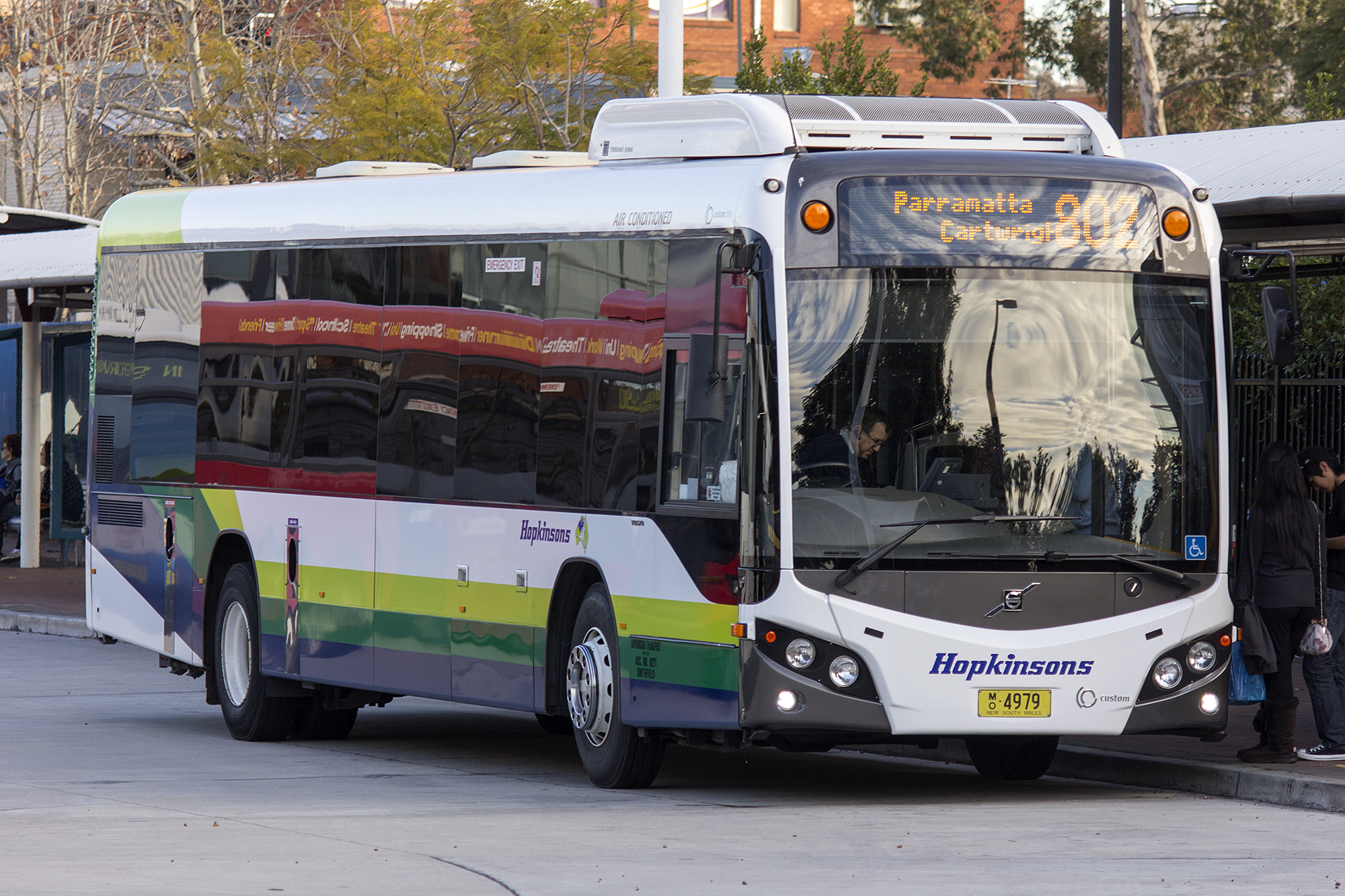
Hopkinsons Custom Coaches 'CB80' bodied Volvo B12BLE

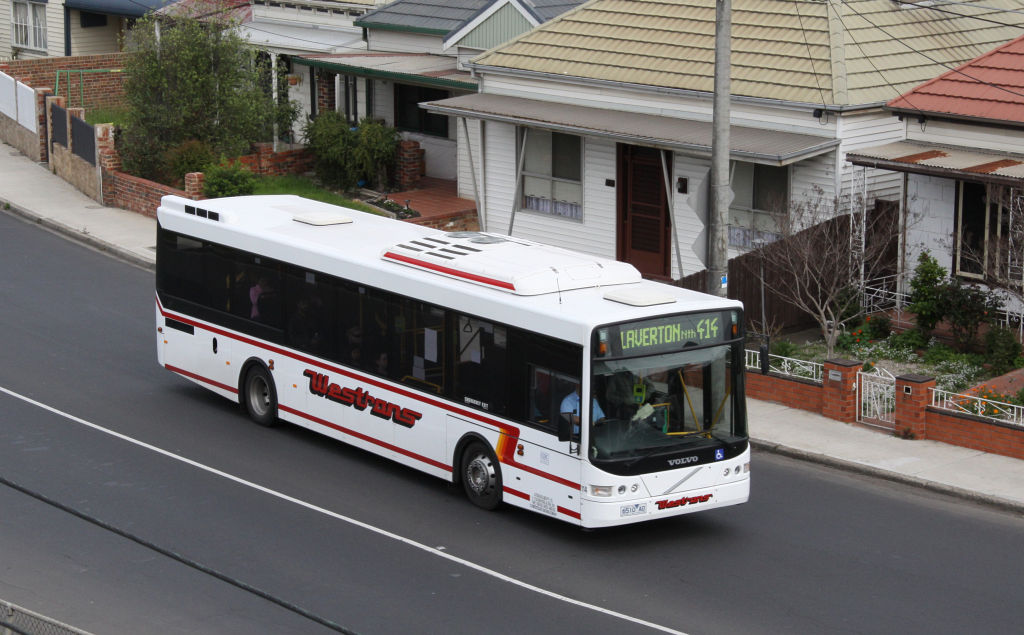
Westrans Volgren CR228L bodied Volvo B12BLE

=== B12BLEA ===
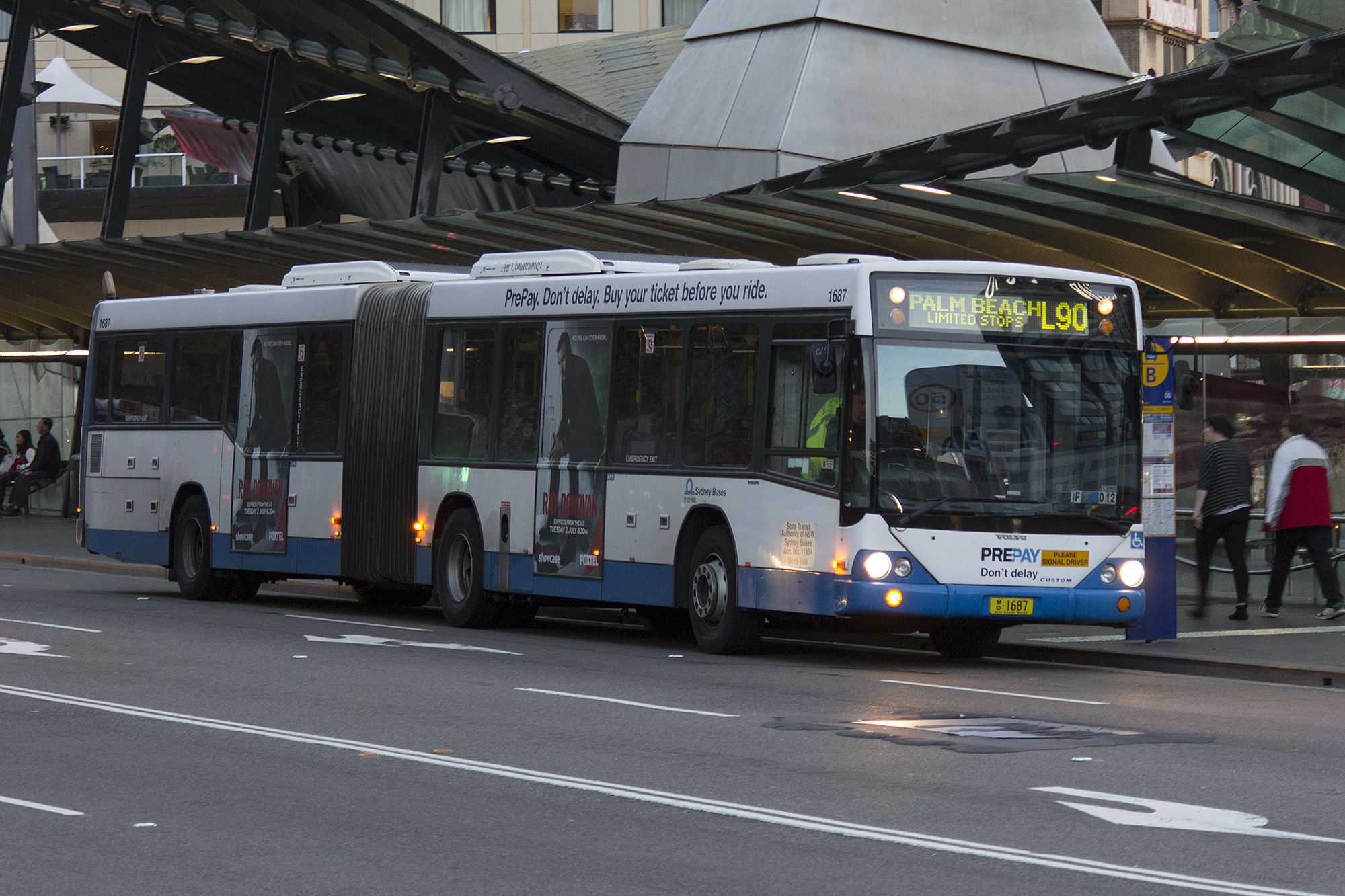
Sydney buses Custom Coaches 'CB60' bodied Volvo B12BLEA

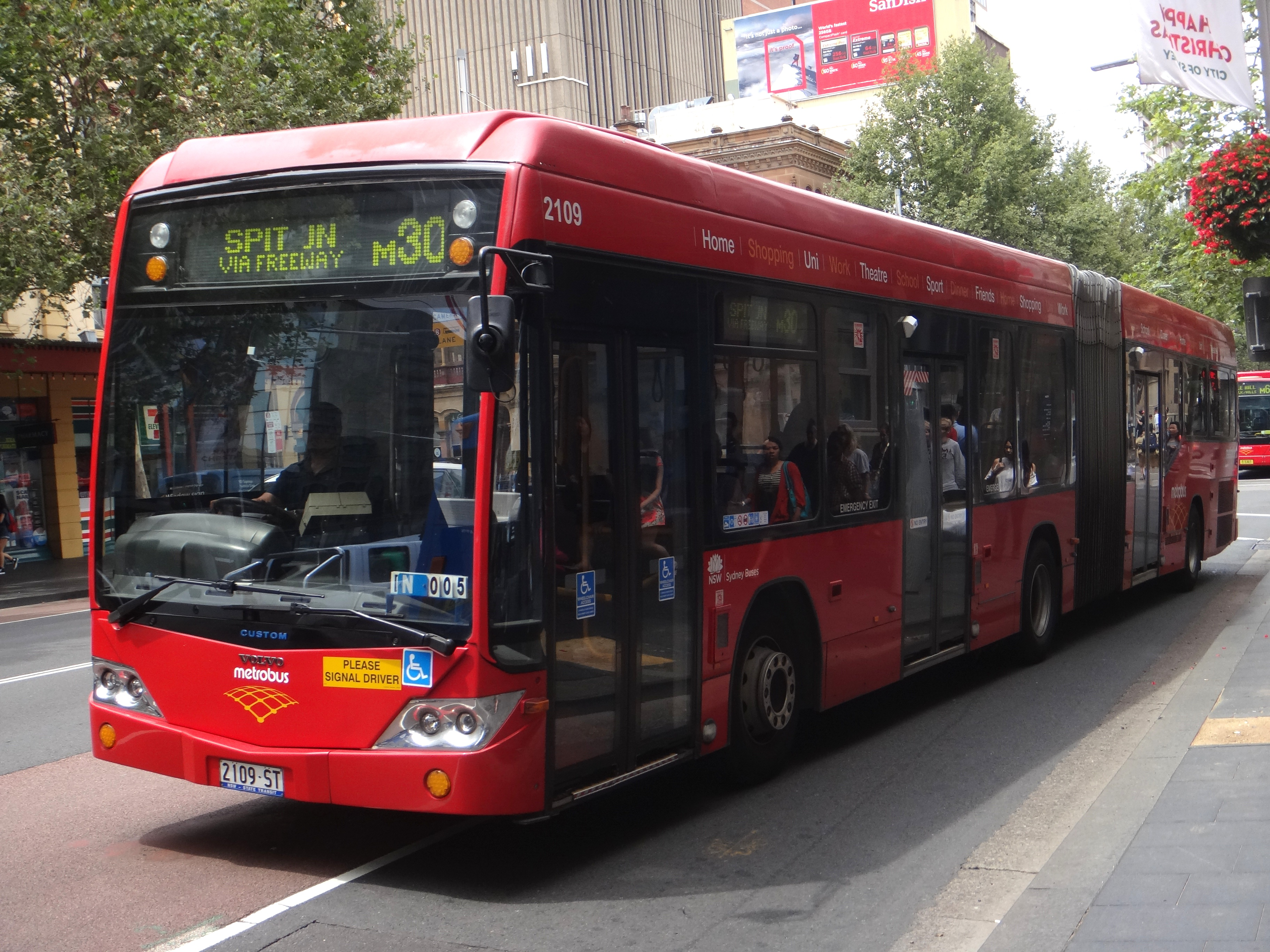
Metrobus Custom Coaches "CB60 Evo II" bodied Volvo B12BLEA Euro V

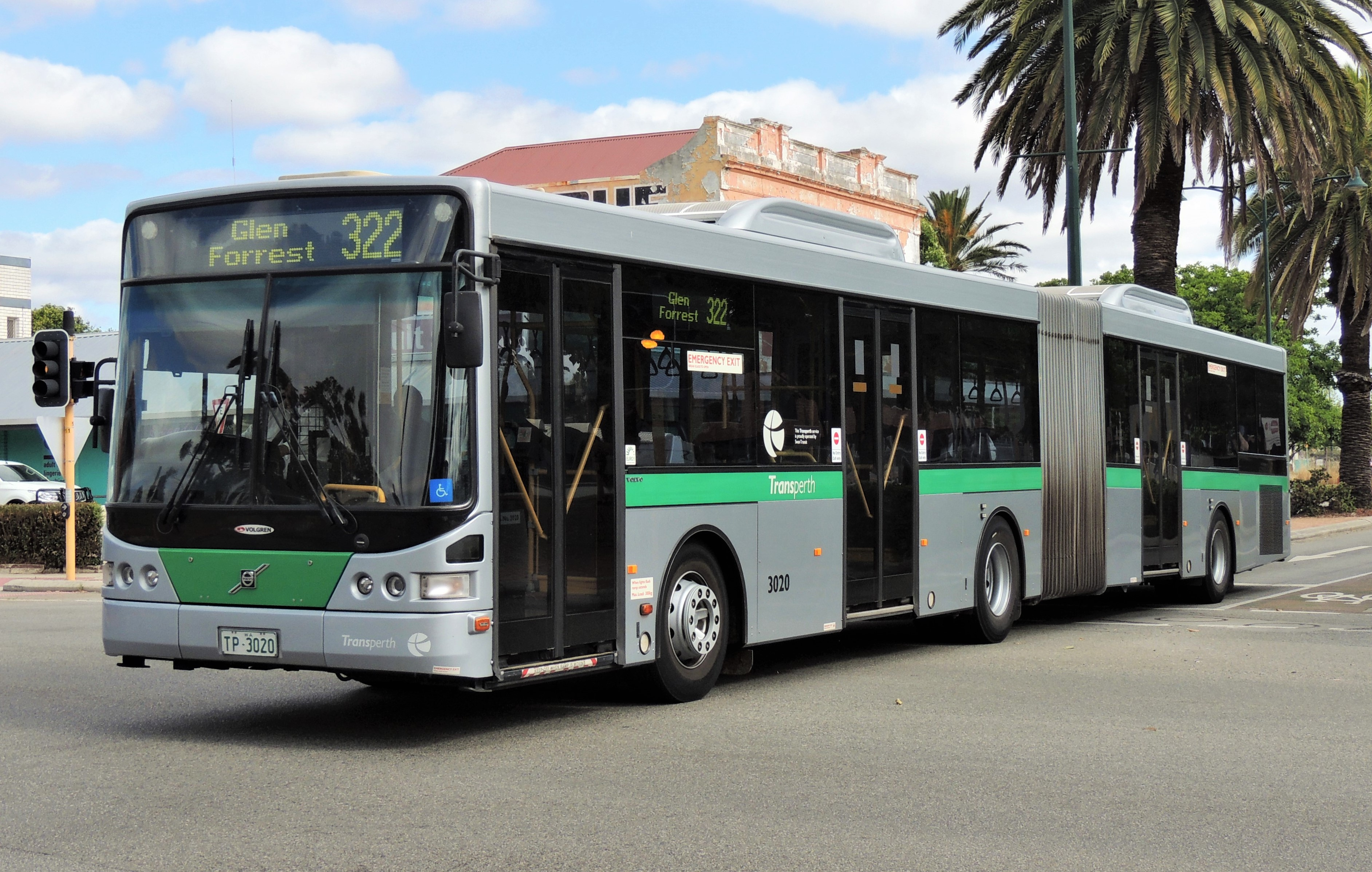
Transperth Volgren CR228L bodied Volvo B12BLEA

== Singapore ==
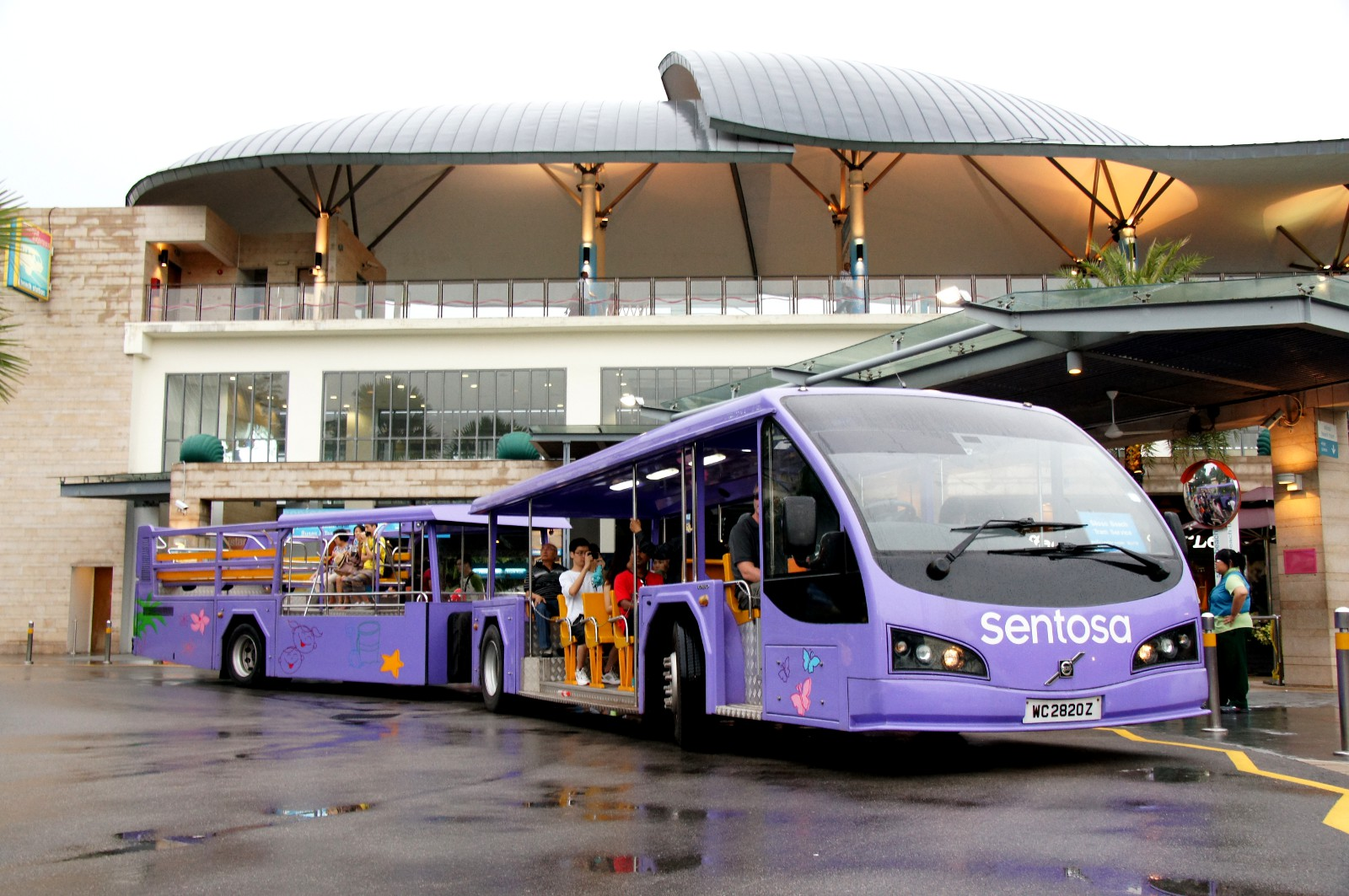
Sentosa's Volvo B12BLEA "road tram"

Two Volvo B12BLEAs used to be operated by Sentosa under the guise of a beach tram running on the island's Siloso Beach Tram route. The rear module of the bus consisted of a large, sheltered standing area with an al-fresco seating area on the elevated part of the bus where the drive axle is located. These buses were bodied by ComfortDelGro Engineering (CDGE) Corporation and are speed-limited for safety reasons. The vehicles bore a purple Sentosa livery.

== See also ==
- List of buses
