= Volvo B7 =

Volvo B7 may refer to different 6.7-, 7.1- and 7.3-litre engined bus chassis from Volvo Buses:

- Volvo B7F, a front-engined bus chassis with the engine mounted over the front axle
- Volvo B7FA, a front-engined bus chassis with the engine mounted before the front axle
- Volvo B7L, a low-floor single- and double-decker city bus chassis with a rear vertically mounted engine
- Volvo B7LA, articulated version of the B7L
- Volvo B7TL, a double-decker city bus chassis with a transverse engine and a shorter rear overhang (comparing with the B7L)
- Volvo B7R, a rear-engined bus and coach chassis
- Volvo B7RLE, a low-entry single-decker city bus chassis developed from the B7R
