= Volvo B10 (disambiguation) =

The Volvo B10 was a front-engined bus chassis built in the 1930s, but may also refer to different 9.6-litre engined bus chassis from Volvo Buses:

- Volvo B10B, a rear-engined bus and coach chassis
- Volvo B10BLE, a low-entry single-decker city bus chassis developed from the B10B
- Volvo B10C, a tri-axle coach chassis based on the B10M, only for the Australian market
- Volvo B10L, a low-floor rear-engined single-decker city bus
- Volvo B10LA, articulated version of the B10L
- Volvo B10M, a versatile mid-engined single-decker bus and coach chassis
- Volvo B10MA, articulated version of the B10M
- Volvo B10MD, double-decker version of the B10M
- Volvo B10R, a rear-engined bus chassis
- Volvo B10TL (Super Olympian), a low-floor rear-engined tri-axled double-decker bus chassis
- Volvo C10M, a coach chassis based on the B10M
