= Volvo B6M =

Overview
- Manufacturer: Volvo

Body and chassis
- Doors: 1
- Floor type: Step entrance

Powertrain
- Engine: Volvo TD60

The Volvo B6M was a mid-engined bus chassis manufactured by Volvo in the 1980s. It was developed as a mid-engined version of the Volvo B6FA.

In Australia, it was purchased in small numbers by McHarry's Buslines, Morisset Bus Lines, Port Stephens Coaches and the Pulitano Group. It was discontinued in 1989.
