= Volvo B6F =

Volvo B609/B6F/B6FA
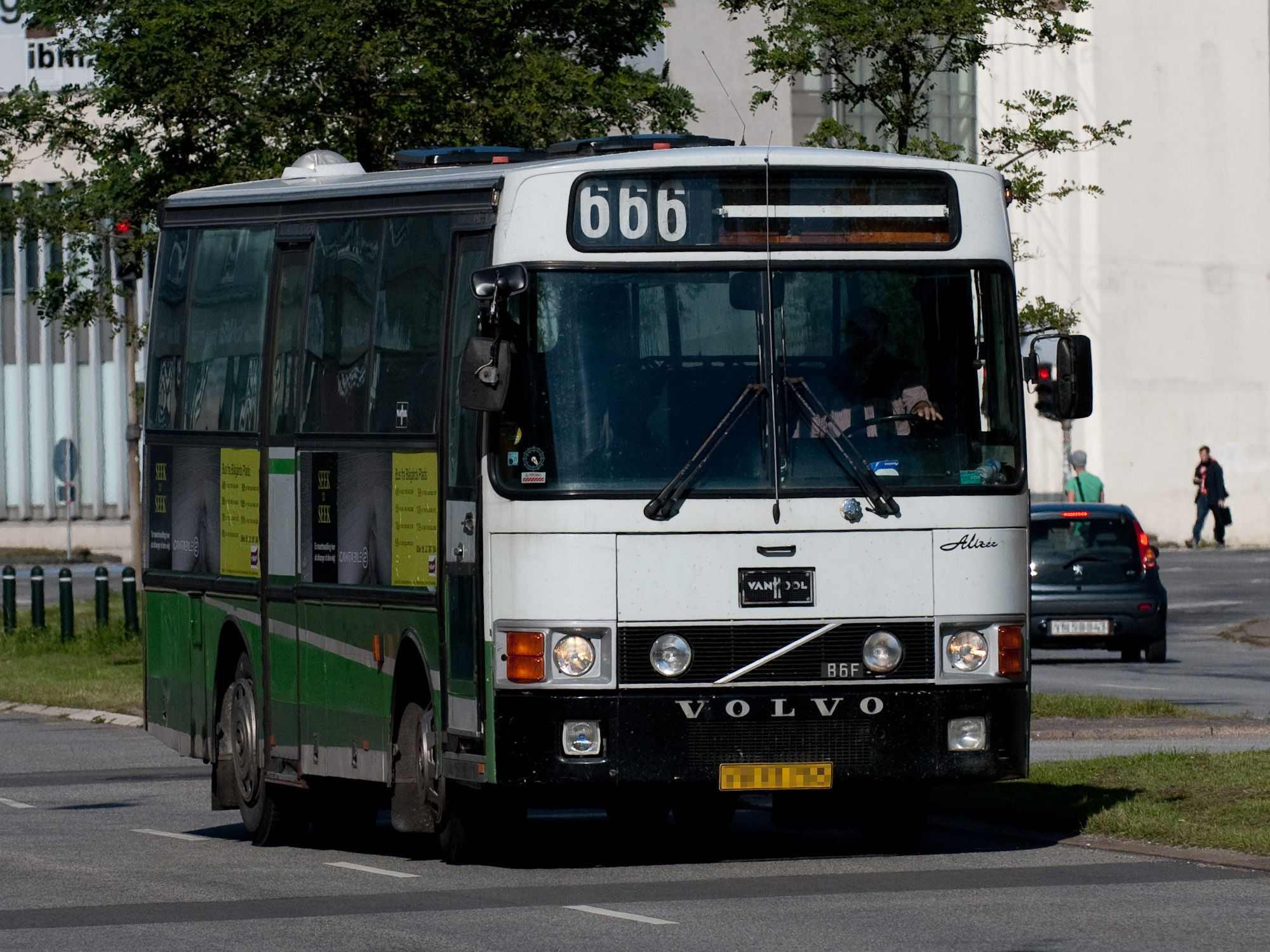
- A Van Hool Alizée bodied B6F in Denmark.

Overview
- Manufacturer: Volvo
- Production: 1976-1987
- Assembly: Sweden

Body and chassis
- Class: Midibus chassis
- Floor type: Step entrance

Powertrain
- Engine: Front-mounted I-6; Volvo TD60
- Capacity: 5.5 litres

Chronology
- Predecessor: Volvo B54

Volvo B609, Volvo B6F and Volvo B6FA were a series of front-engined midibus chassises manufactured by Volvo between 1976 and 1987. Its predecessor, the B54 was not a success, while the interim replacement, the BB57 was too large, so in 1976 Volvo launched the B609, which was in many ways just a Volvo F6 truck chassis without the cab, which meant it had the engine mounted on top of the front axle. In 1978 it was replaced by the B6F, which was built in the same way, but a bit more adapted to bus needs. Volvo also introduced the B6FA, which was a more conventional front-engined chassis, and a bit larger too. While the B6F had max gross weight of 9.3 tonnes the B6FA would manage 12 tonnes. While production of the smaller B6F ended in 1982, the B6FA lasted until 1987.

There were no successors to this series, but in 1991 the B6 name was used again when a new rear-engined chassis was introduced.

In Australia, the B6FA was purchased by Western Road Transport in Sydney and US Bus Lines in Melbourne.
