= Volvo B54 =

Front-engined midibus chassis from Volvo

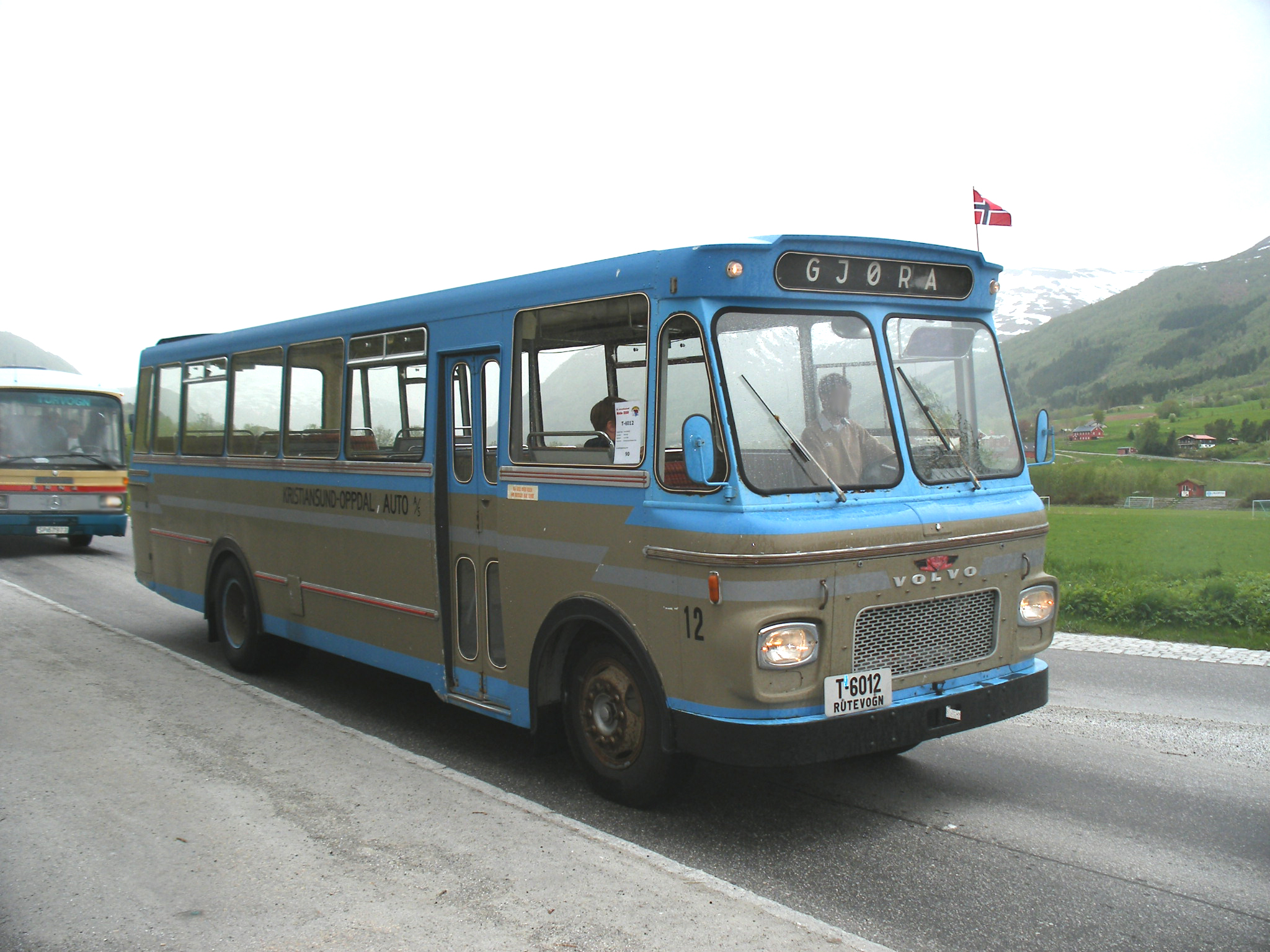
- A VBK-bodied B54 from KOA near Molde in May 2008.

Overview
- Manufacturer: Volvo
- Production: 1966-1971
- Assembly: Sweden

Body and chassis
- Class: Midibus chassis
- Floor type: Step entrance

Powertrain
- Engine: 5.1-litre front-mounted I-6; Volvo D50, TD50

Chronology
- Predecessor: Volvo B705
- Successor: Volvo B609

Volvo B54 was a front-engined midibus chassis manufactured by Volvo between 1966 and 1971. It was technically more or less just a Volvo F85 truck chassis without the cab. The engine was mounted on top of the front axle, giving the buses very little front overhang. Before the end of production in 1971, it was in a way replaced by the larger BB57, but the true successor was the F6-based B609 that came in 1976, half a decade later. The B54's predecessor had gone out of production in 1964, so it was clearly not a model that Volvo put a lot of effort into at the time. Only 533 chassis were built.
