= B57 =

B57 or B-57 may refer to:

- BMW B57, a turbo-diesel straight-six engine, produced by BMW since 2015
- Bundesstraße 57, a German road
- B57 (New York City bus) in Brooklyn
- B57 nuclear bomb
- Martin B-57 Canberra, a US-built version of the English Electric Canberra bomber
- Volvo B57, a bus by Volvo Group
- Sicilian Defence in the Encyclopaedia of Chess Openings
- HLA-B57, an HLA-B serotype
