= Volvo B5RLEH =

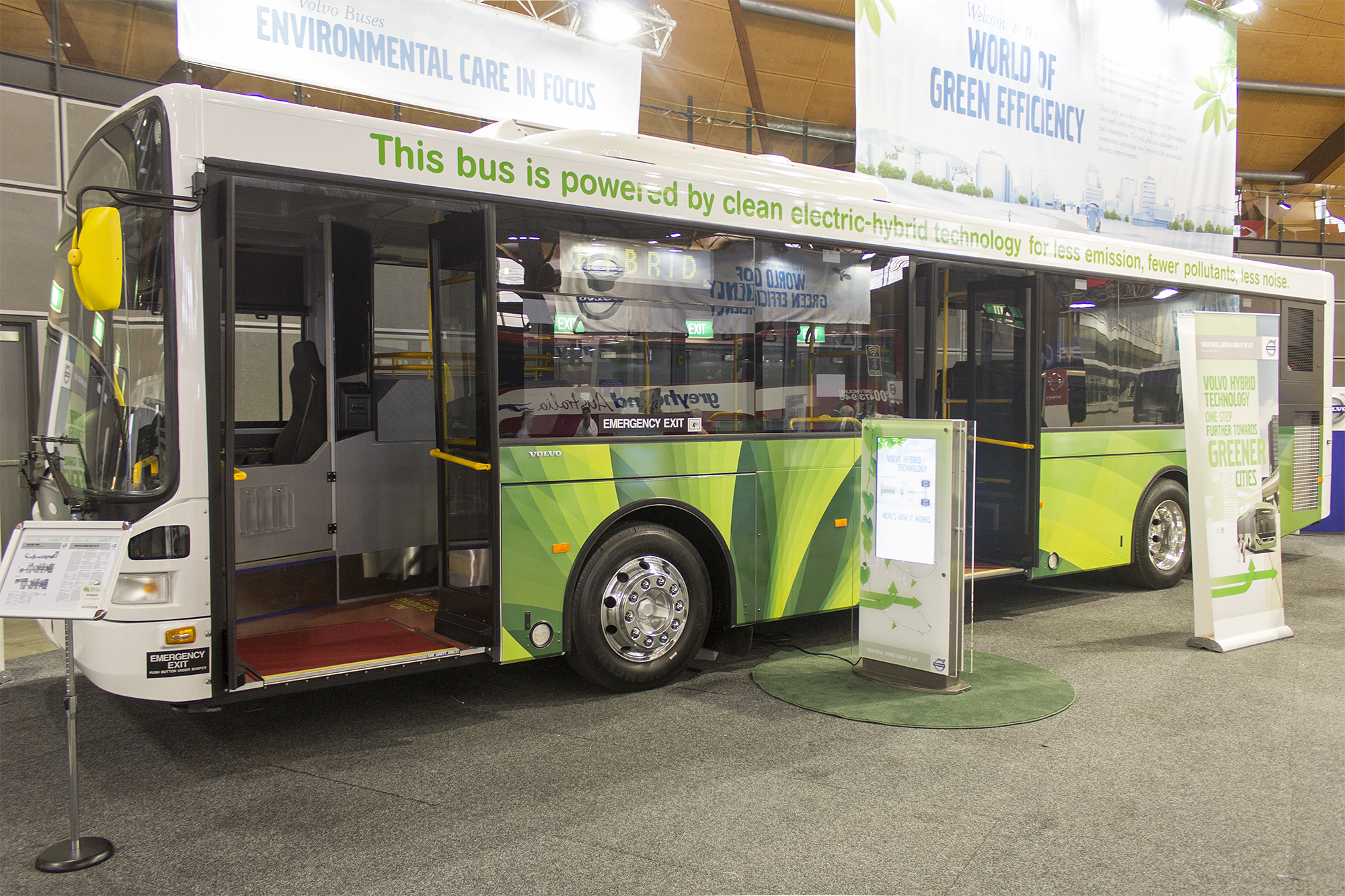
- Volgren-bodied B5RLEH in September 2013

Overview
- Manufacturer: Volvo
- Production: 2013–present

Body and chassis
- Class: Hybrid-electric single-decker bus chassis
- Body style: Single-decker bus
- Doors: 2 doors
- Floor type: Low entry
- Chassis: Volvo B5RLE

Powertrain
- Engine: Volvo D5F215
- Capacity: 76 Passengers
- Transmission: Volvo I-Shift 12 speed

Dimensions
- Length: 11.5m
- Width: 2.55m

Chronology
- Predecessor: Volvo B7RLE (Australia)

First announced in August 2012, the Volvo B5RLEH, also known as Volvo B5RH and Volvo B215RH, is a hybrid-electric single-decker bus chassis manufactured by Volvo since 2013, initially only available in the Asia-Pacific region.

There is also a B215RH model for Latin America, manufactured by Volvo in Brazil, available as both low- and high-floor chassis.

== Operators ==
In January 2013, Australian operator Transperth took delivery of a Volgren bodied B5RLEH for use on its Perth Central Area Transit network.

In January 2014, a second Volgren bodied Volvo B5RLEH commenced a 12-month trial with Adelaide operator Torrens Transit.

In March 2015, a third Volgren bodied Volvo B5RLEH commenced a six-month trial with Singapore operator SBS Transit. It debuted on Express 506 from 1 March 2015 and later operated on services 185 and 143 till 10 September 2015. On 11 February 2016, an additional six month-trial was permitted and the bus was redeployed to the Ang Mo Kio Depot for operations on services 268 and 13. At the end of the trial period, the bus was deregistered and returned to Australia, where it was operated by CDC Melbourne until March 2019.

In April 2015, the first Volgren bodied Volvo B5RLEH commenced a trial with Brisbane operator Transport for Brisbane.

Between June 2017 and December 2018, ACTION leased a demonstrator Volvo B5RLEH with a Bustech body as part of the Australian Capital Territory's electric bus trial. It was registered as BUS712, and was wrapped in a special livery before starting service, as it arrived in the standard Transport for NSW livery. It ran alongside two BYD Toro electric buses as part of this trial.

In June 2019 Port Stephens Coaches begun using two Bustech bodied Volvo B5RLEHs on student university shuttles between University of Newcastle's Newcastle and Callaghan campuses.

== Engines ==
D5F, 4,764 cc (291 cu in), in-line 4 cyl. turbodiesel (2013–present)

- D5F215 - 161 kilowatts (216 bhp), 800 Nm, Euro 5/EEV
