= Volvo B10C =

Overview
- Manufacturer: Volvo
- Production: 1988-91

Body and chassis
- Doors: 1
- Floor type: Step entrance

Powertrain
- Engine: Volvo THD102KD

The Volvo B10C was a coach chassis manufactured by Volvo between 1988 and 1991. It was developed as a 3-axle version of the Volvo B10M specifically for the Australian market and came with a raked front. It sold in small numbers with purchasers including the Australian Army, Bus Australia and Peninsula Bus Lines.
