= Volvo B7F =

Volvo B7F/B7FA
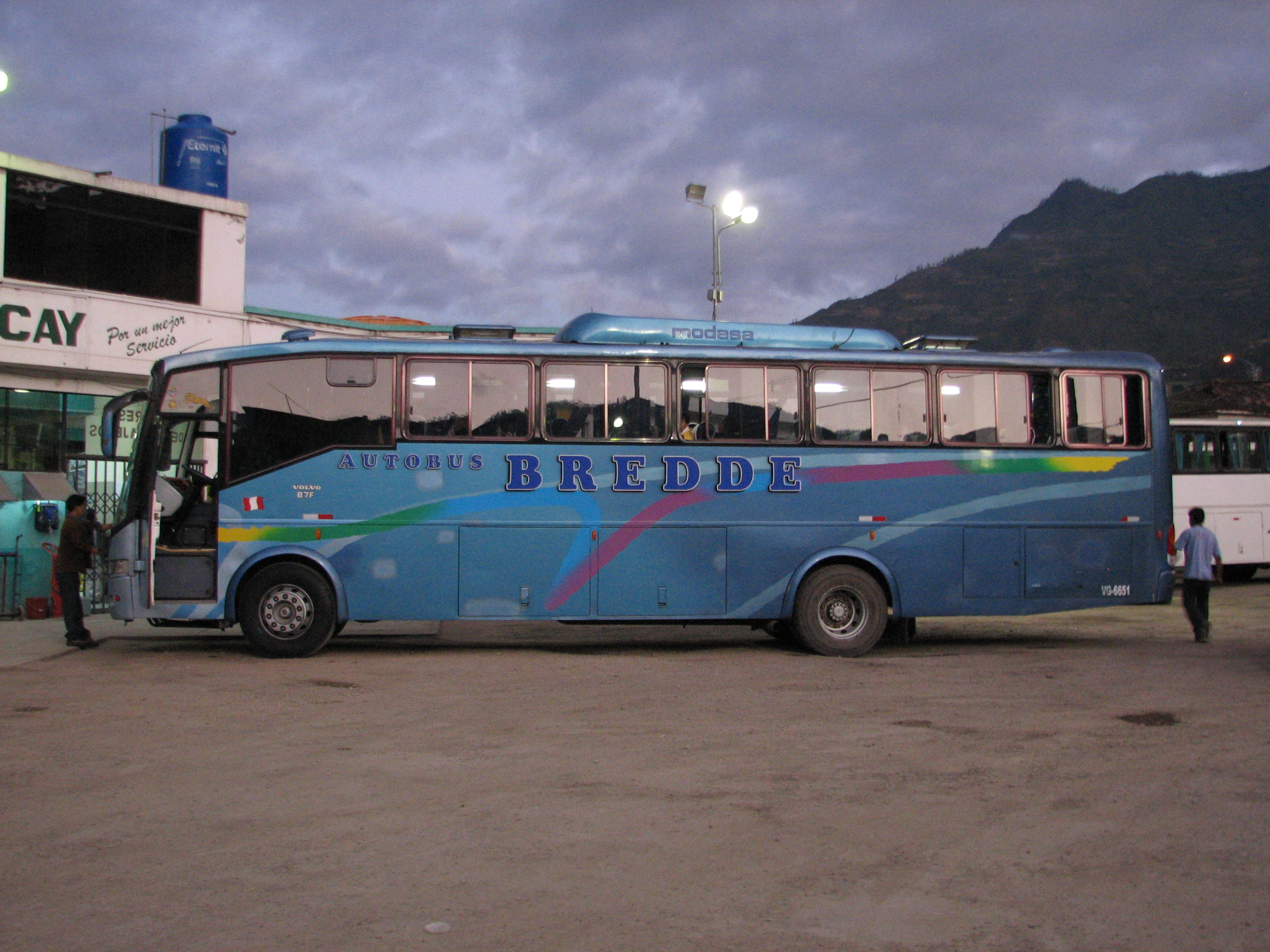
- A Bredde B7F at Abancay central bus station.

Overview
- Manufacturer: Volvo
- Production: (1978?)-?

Body and chassis
- Class: Bus chassis
- Floor type: Step entrance

Powertrain
- Engine: 6.7-litre front-mounted I-6; Volvo TD70, D7A, D7B

Chronology
- Predecessor: Volvo BB57 (B7F); Volvo B57 (B7FA)
- Successor: Volvo B270F

Volvo B7F and Volvo B7FA were a series of front-engined single-decker bus chassis manufactured by Volvo. While the B7FA was a more conventional front-engined chassis, the B7F had the engine mounted on top of the front axle, giving the buses very little front overhang.

The models are not known to have been available in Europe, but they could at least be found in Latin America, New Zealand and South Africa.

== Volvo B270F ==
There may not be a full continuity back to the old B7F models, but at the plant in Curitiba, Brazil, Volvo are currently manufacturing the front-engined Volvo B270F for the Latin American market. A rather simple construction with leaf springs and a 7.2-litre engine from MWM International Motores.
