= Port Stephens Coaches =

Australian bus company

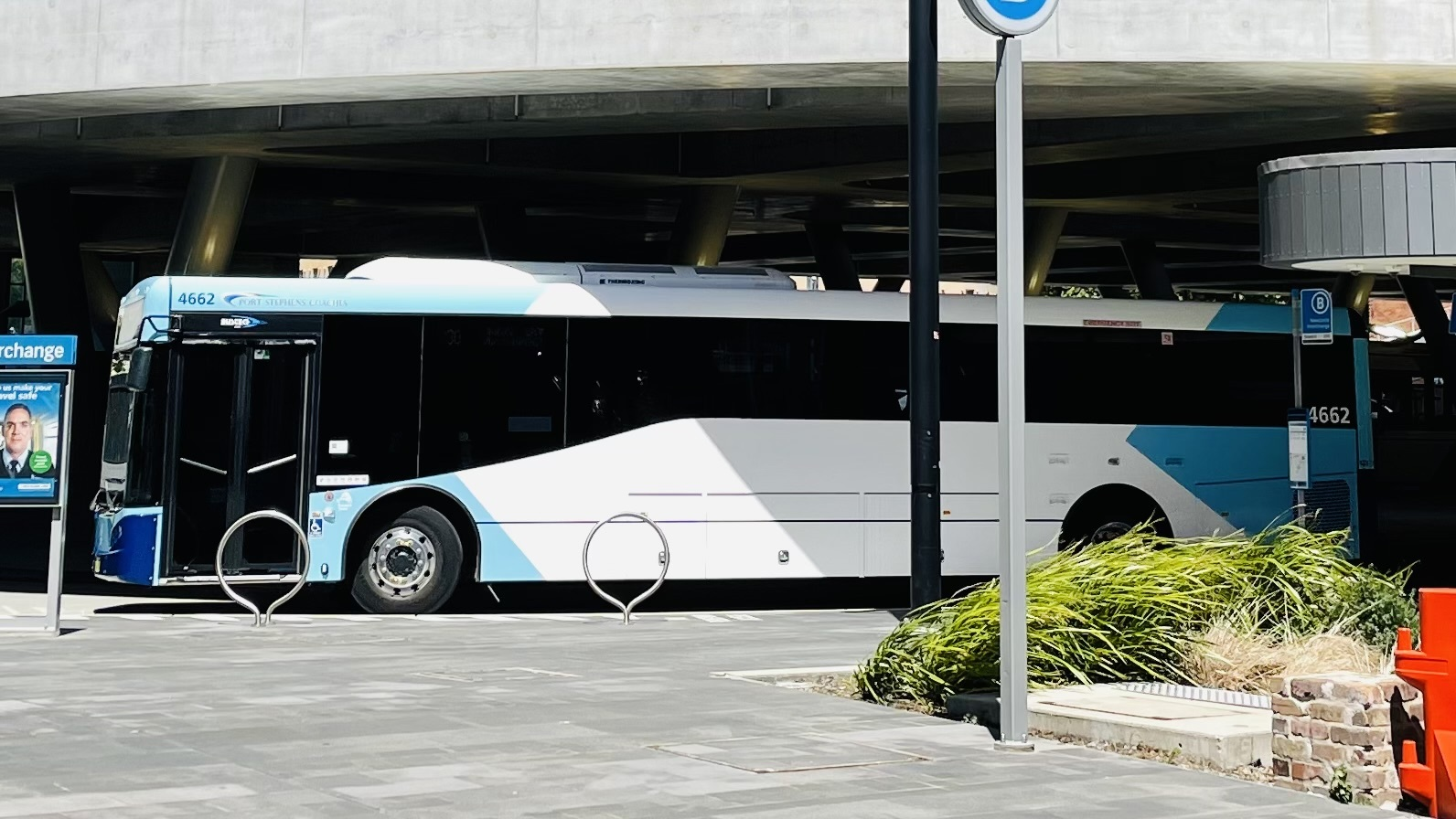
- A Port Stephens Coaches Bustech ADi at Newcastle Interchange in November 2022
- Parent: Fogg family
- Commenced operation: 1957
- Headquarters: Anna Bay
- Service area: Hunter Region
- Service type: Bus & coach operator
- Routes: 7
- Depots: 2
- Fleet: 69 (October 2014)
- Website: www.pscoaches.com.au

Port Stephens Coaches is an Australian bus company operating services in Port Stephens and the Hunter Region.

== History ==
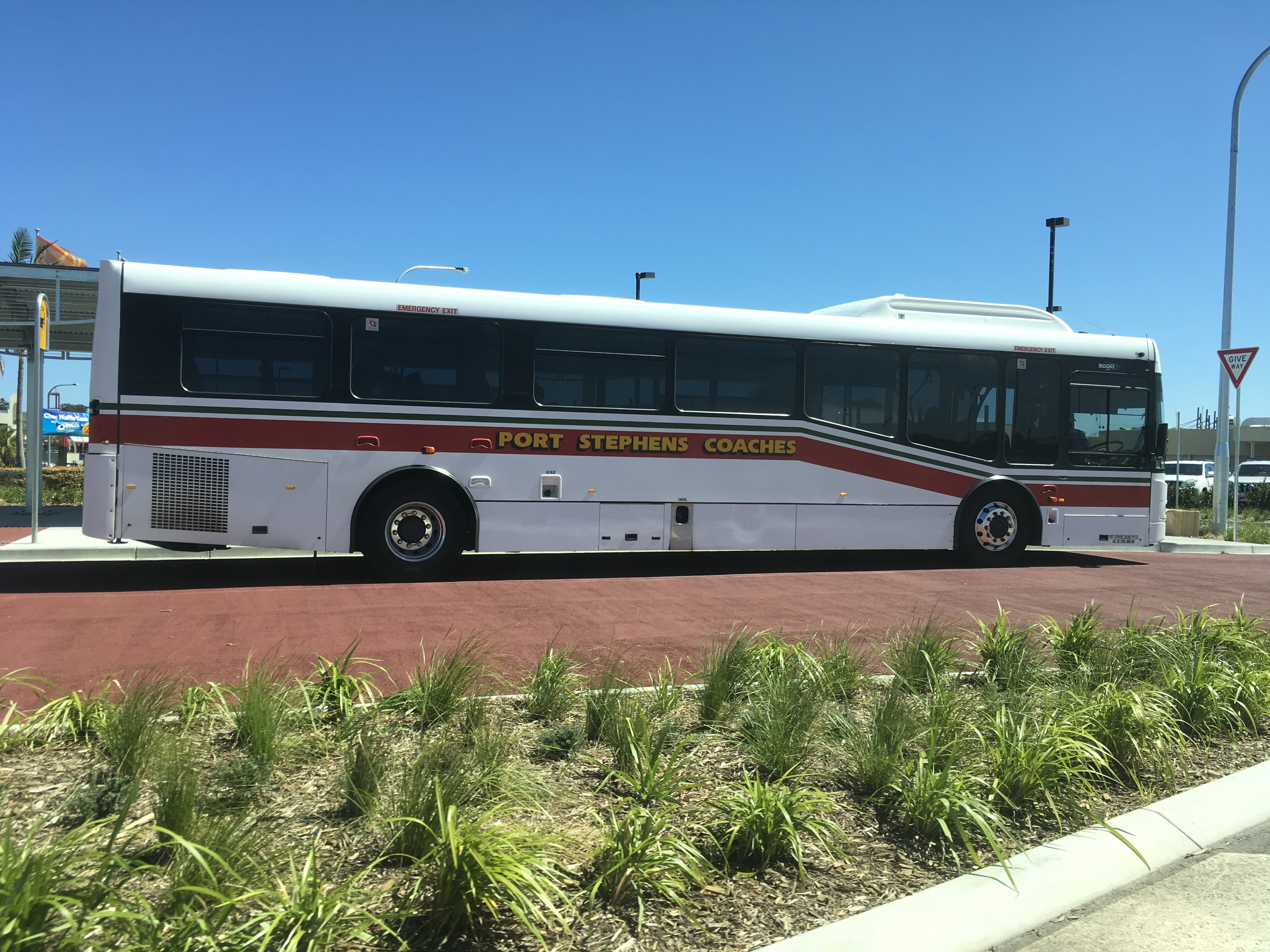
A Port Stephens Coaches bus in the Port Stephens suburb of Salamander Bay in January 2018

In the 1940s, the Newcastle to Nelson Bay service was purchased by the Fogg family. In 1957, the route was purchased by Sid Fogg and renamed Port Stephens Coaches. At this stage the fleet consisted of six buses.

In 1972, Port Stephens Coaches commenced operating tours to the Hunter Valley vineyards. In 1986, an express service commenced between Nelson Bay and Sydney.

In the 2000s, a second depot was established in Sandgate. Buses based here were originally signwritten for Newcastle Coaches until 2024 where the branding was then retired with the operations and the fleet then rebranded under the Port Stephens Coaches Umbrella.

In 2019 the company introduced two Volvo B5RLEH Hybrid Buses with Bustech VSTH bodywork into its fleet.

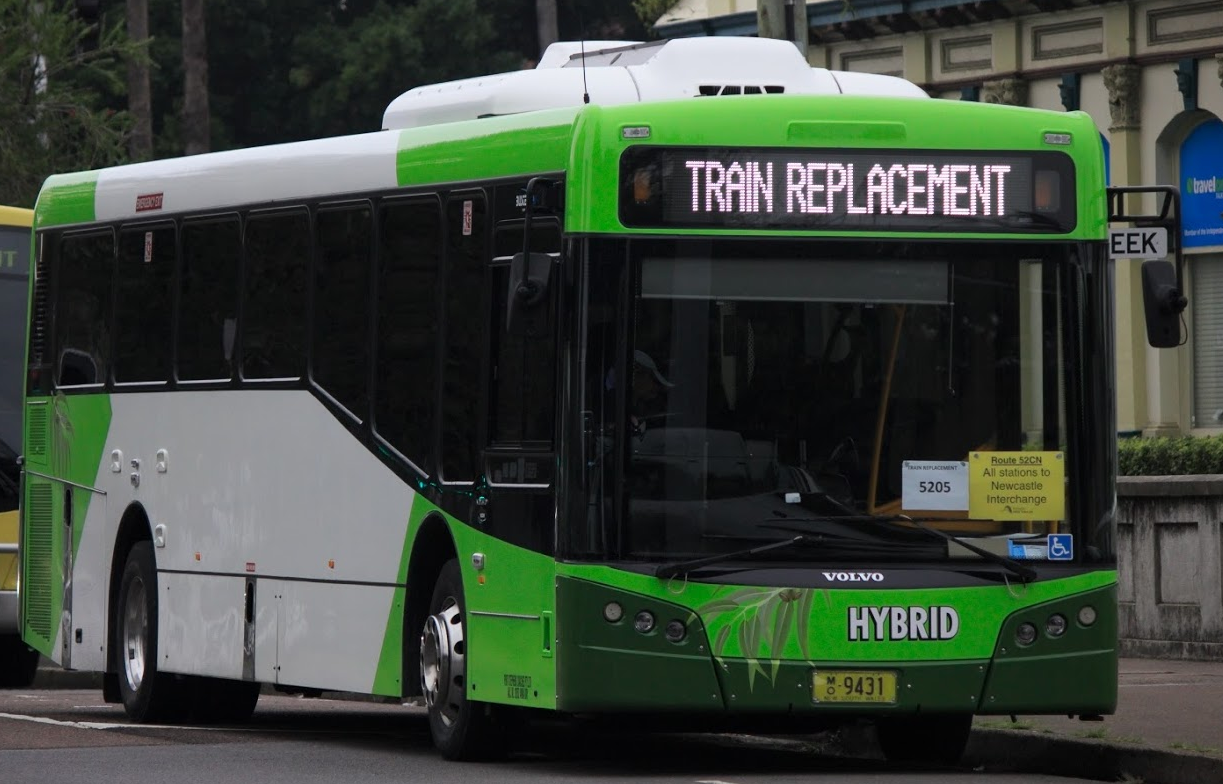
Port Stephens Coaches Volvo B5RLEH bodied Bustech VST Hybrid bus seen operating a train replacement in Newcastle in June 2019

== Services ==
Since 2008, Port Stephens Coaches's services in Port Stephens have been part of Sydney Outer Metropolitan Bus Region 3.

== Fleet ==
As at October 2014, the fleet consisted of 69 buses and coaches. Fleet livery is white, red and green. In 2012, the Transport for New South Wales white and blue livery was adopted for route buses.

== Depots ==
Port Stephens operate depots in Anna Bay and Sandgate.
