= Volvo F4/ F6/ F7 =

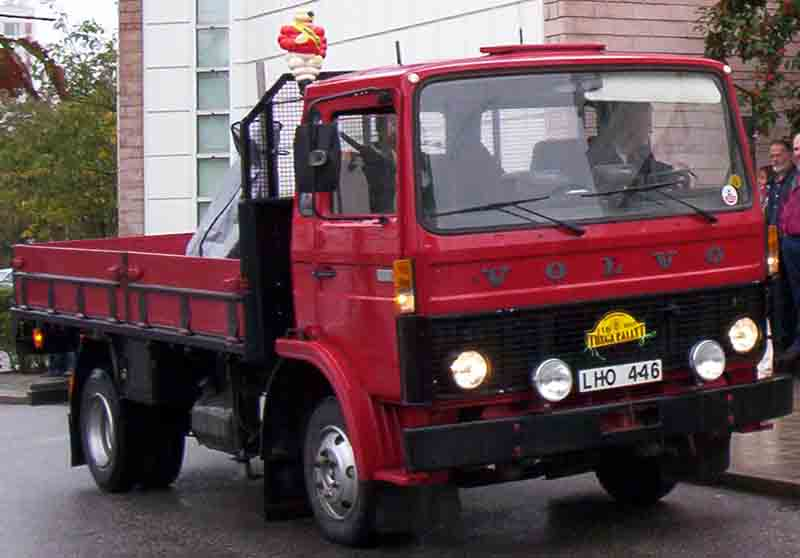
- Volvo F407 (1977)

Overview
- Manufacturer: Volvo
- Also called: F406; F407; F408; F6
- Production: 1975–1986
- Assembly: Belgium: Ghent (Oostakker)

Body and chassis
- Class: Light truck
- Body style: Cab Over Engine
- Layout: Rear-wheel drive
- Related: Volvo F6

Powertrain
- Engine: Inline 6 turbodiesel: Volvo; TD40A (3.59 L) 126 hp, 295 Nm
- Transmission: 5 speed manual; Single dry-plate clutch, 305 mm; Gear ratios: 6.40:1, 3.63:1, 2.16:1, 1.43:1, 1.00:1, reverse 5.88:1

Dimensions
- Wheelbase: 2850–4450 mm
- Length: 5.83–8.25 m
- Width: 2.2 m
- Height: 2.43 m + canopy
- Curb weight: 2,600–2,870 kg

Chronology
- Predecessor: Volvo Snabbe
- Successor: FL4

The Volvo F4 (also marketed as F6 and F7 in some versions) is a light truck series produced by Volvo Trucks from 1975 to 1986. The F6 variant came equipped with a more powerful engine. These trucks were often used for parcel and urban delivery services.

== History ==
Produced in Ghent, Belgium, the Volvo F4/F6 served as a compact alternative in Volvo’s truck lineup. They featured a 3.59-liter turbocharged inline-six diesel engine (TD40A) producing 126 hp and 295 Nm of torque. The powertrain was paired with a 5-speed manual transmission and rear-wheel drive.

Although popular for delivery operations, the model was known for its sensitivity to corrosion. It was ultimately succeeded by the Volvo FL4.
