= Volvo B57 =

Volvo B57/BB57
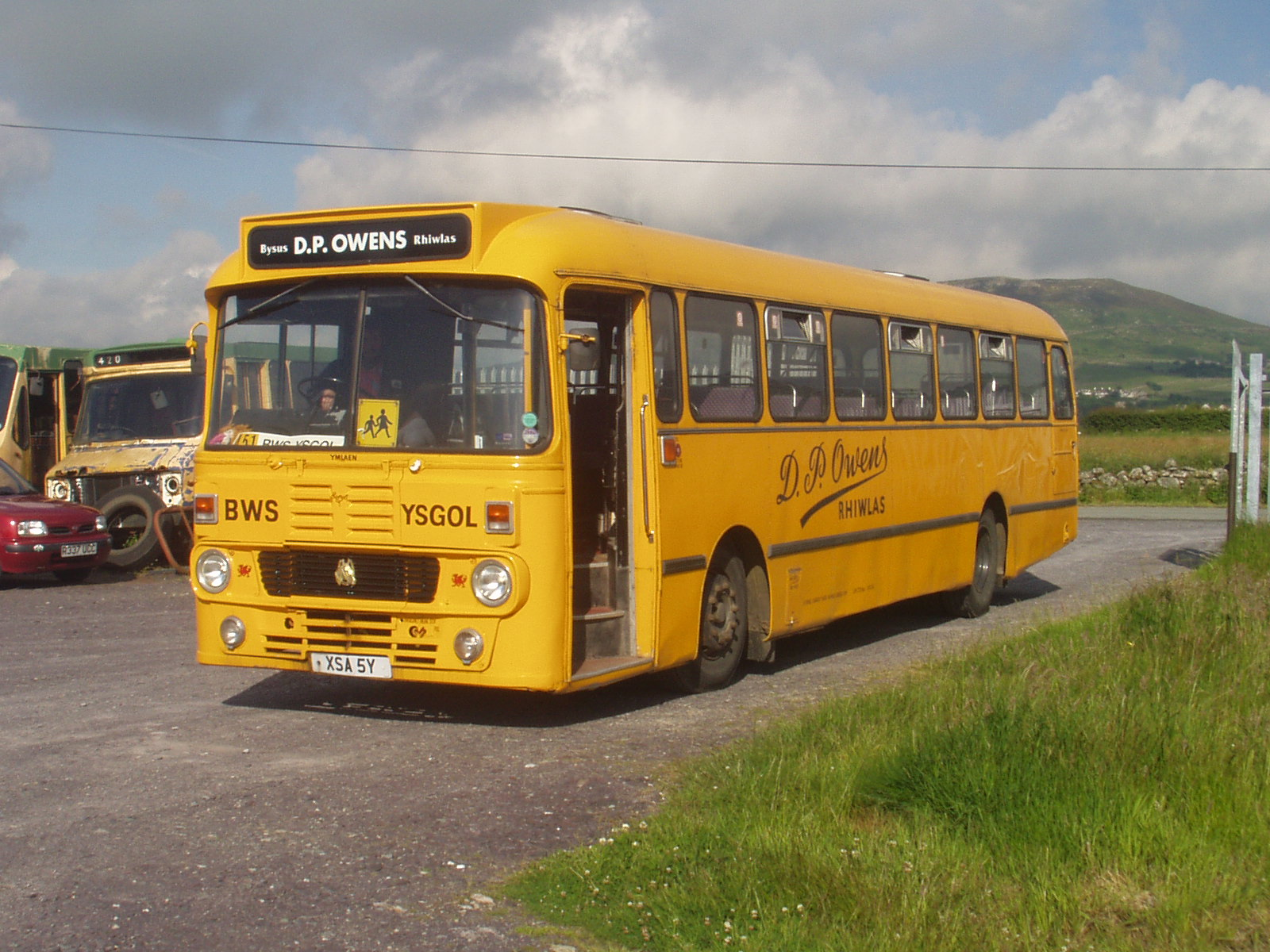
- DP Owens Alexander Y Type bodied Volvo B57

Overview
- Manufacturer: Volvo
- Production: 1966-1982
- Assembly: Sweden

Body and chassis
- Class: Bus chassis
- Floor type: Step entrance

Powertrain
- Engine: 6.7-litre front-mounted I-6; Volvo D70, TD70

Chronology
- Predecessor: Volvo B715 (B57); Volvo B615 (BB57)
- Successor: Volvo B7FA (B57); Volvo B7F (BB57)

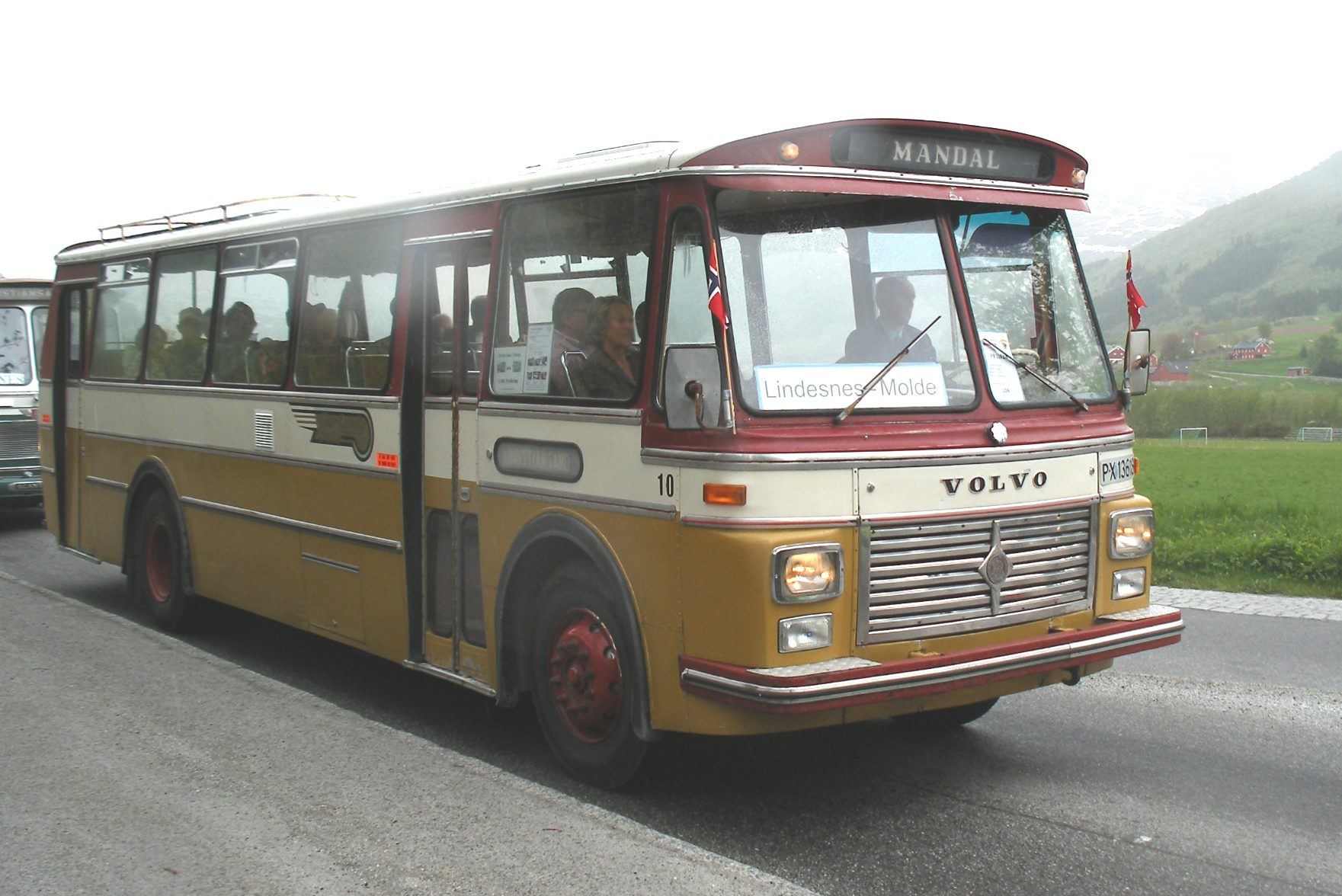
A vintage Repstad bodied BB57 from Sørlandsruta, near Molde in May 2008

Volvo B57 was a front-engined single-decker bus chassis manufactured by Volvo between 1966 and 1982. Since 1970 it was also available as the Volvo BB57, with the engine mounted on top of the front axle, giving the buses very little front overhang. The BB57 became a kind of replacement for the smaller B54, but as it was larger, the B54 got its true replacement later. The predecessor to BB57, the B615 had gone out of production in 1965, but apparently the demand for such a model was so high that they had to bring it back almost half a decade later, as the B54 proved to be too small.

Both B57 and BB57 could be built in three different wheelbase lengths: 5 metres (B57-50), 5.5 metres (B57-55) and 6 metres (B57-60).

This chassis type was rare in the United Kingdom, but was quite popular in rural parts of the Nordic countries.

== Singapore ==
Singapore Bus Service introduced a fleet of 350 New Zealand Motor Bodies bodied B57s between 1980 and 1983 following a successful trial of a Metal Sections-bodied demonstrator in 1979. Of these, the first 200 units were fitted with Version 1 of the bodywork, which hard a raised angular roof for the front destination signage, and the balance 150 units fitted with Version 2 of the bodywork, which had a curved roof for the front destination signage. All units were retired and sold to Bus Éireann, Ireland between 1994 and 1998 for use on school bus duties in rural areas.

== Pakistan ==
In Pakistan, the Punjab Urban Transport Corporation placed 300 in service in Lahore.

== Australia ==
In Australia, four B57s were purchased by Neville's Bus Service while another was purchased by Cairnstrans.
