= Volvo Buses =

Swedish transportation manufacturer

Volvo Bussar AB
- Trade name: Volvo Buses; Volvo Bus Corporation
- Type: Subsidiary
- Industry: Bus manufacturing
- Founded: 1968; 58 years ago
- Headquarters: Gothenburg, Sweden
- Areas served: Worldwide
- Key people: Anna Westerberg (President)
- Brands: Volvo; Prevost Car; Nova Bus
- Revenue: ▲25.386 billion kr (2016)
- Operating income: ▲0.911 billion kr (2016)
- Number of employees: 7,353 (2016)
- Parent: Volvo
- Website: www.volvobuses.com

Volvo Bussar AB, stylized as VOLVO, is a subsidiary and a business area of the Swedish vehicle maker Volvo, which became an independent division in 1968. It is based in Gothenburg.

It is one of the world's largest bus manufacturers, with a complete range of heavy buses for passenger transport. The product range includes complete buses and coaches as well as chassis combined with a comprehensive range of services.

The bus operation has a global presence, with production in Europe, North and South America, Asia and Australia. In India it set up its production facility in Bangalore. A former production facility was located in Irvine, Scotland (closed in 2000).

== Products ==
=== Chassis ===
Codes in parentheses are VIN codes for the chassis models.

==== Historical ====
- 1930s/40s: B10, B12
- 1950s: B627
- 1950s–1960s: B615/B616/B617
- 1950s–1960s: B635/B638
- 1950s–1960s: B705
- 1950s–1960s: B725/B727
- 1951–1963: B655 (mid-engine)/B656/B657/B658
- 1960s: B715
- 1963–1965: B755
- 1960s–1980s: B57 & BB57
- 1965–1982: B58
- 1966–1971: B54
- 1970–1980: B59
- 1973–1985: Ailsa B55
- 1978–2001: B10M/B10MA/B10MD (1M) – the double deck city bus version B10MD, built from 1982 to 1993, was also known as Citybus
  - 1983–1996? B9M (9M) – low-budget version of the B10M
  - 1988–1991 B10C (1C) – special Australian coach version of the B10M
- 1978–1991: B10R (1R)
- 1978–1987?: B6F/B6FA (6A)
- 198?–198?: B6M (6M) – for Asia Pacific
- 1990–2002: B10B (R1)
- 1991–2011: B12 (R2) – known as B12R, later B380R/B420R in Brazil
- 1991–1998: B6/B6LE (R3)
- 1992–2000: Olympian (YN) – modified from Leyland Olympian
- 1992–2004: B10BLE (R4)
- 1993-2000s: B10L/B10LA (R5)
- 1999–2006: B7L/B7LA (R7)
- 2002-2014: Volvo B7RLE (R7) - Replacement for the B7L, superseded by The B8RLE chassis.
- 1998–2002: B6BLE (R3)
- 1997–2011: B12B (R8)
  - 2001–2011: B12BLE/B12BLEA (R8) – articulated version was introduced in 2005
- 1998–2004: Super Olympian (S1) – also known as B10TL
- 1999–2006: B7TL (S2)
- 2000–2003: B10R (S3) – for Brazil
- 2002–2018: B9TL (S4) – low-floor double-decker, once known as Olympian in Volvo official website
- 2010?–2013: B9RLE (S5)
- 2012–2021: B5TL (T9) – low-floor double-decker

==== Current ====
- 1997–: B7R (R6) – known as B290R in Brazil since 2011
- 1999–: B12M/B12MA (R9) – known as B340M in Brazil since 2011 (bi-articulated version was introduced in 2002)
- 2003–: B9R (S5) – known as B340R/B380R in Brazil 2011–2012
- 2002–: B9S (S6) – bi-articulated version was introduced in 2006, known as B360S in Brazil since 2011
- 2005–: B9L/B9LA (S7) – low-floor
- 2008–: B5LH (T1) – low-floor hybrid-electric bus
- 2009–: BXXR (T2)
  - 2009–: B13R – 12.8-litre engine
  - 2011–: B11R – 10.8-litre engine, known as B340R/B380R/B420R/B450R in Brazil
- 2011–: B270F (T5) – front-engined
- 2012–: B5RH/B5RLEH (T8) – step-entrance/low-entry hybrid-electric bus, known as B215RH/B215LH in Brazil
- 2013–: B8R (T7)
  - 2013–: B8RLE/B8RLEA (T7) – low-entry version of the B8R
- 2015–: BE (U1)
- 2016–: B8L (U2) – low-floor double-decker
- 2021–: BZL – low-floor single/double-decker
- 2024–: BZR – flexible electric chassis

=== Complete buses ===
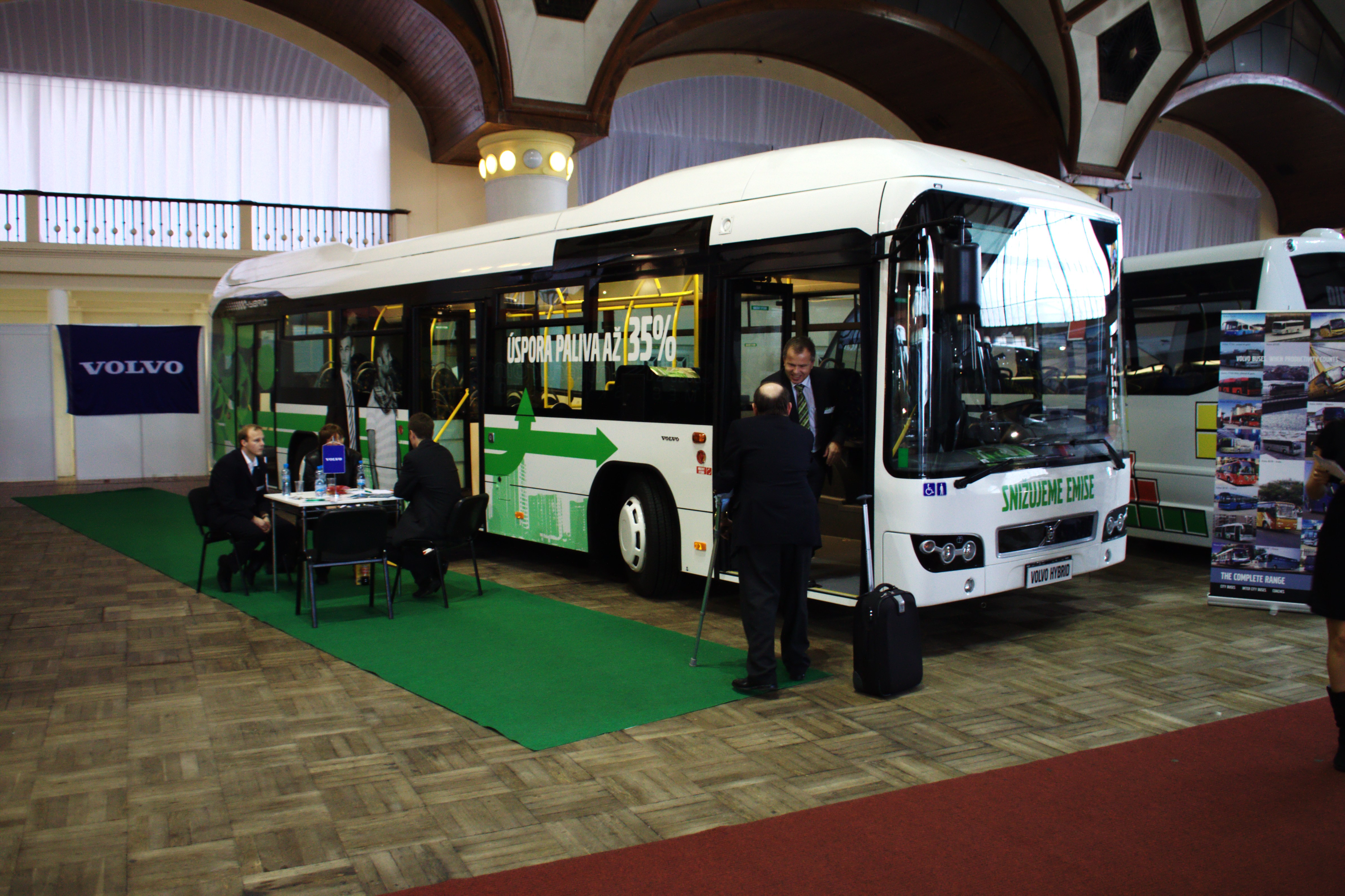
Hybrid Volvo 7700H bus at the Czech Bus Fair 2011

- C10M (built in 1980s)
- 5000/7500 low-floor citybus (B10L/B7L/B9S Articulated chassis)
- 7000/7700 low-floor citybus (B10L/B7L/B9L chassis)
- 7250/7350 coach (Volvo/Drögmöller B10-400/B7R chassis) – for Mexico
- 7400 – for India
- 7400XL – for India
- 7450/7550 coach
- 7700A articulated low-floor citybus (B7LA/B9LA chassis)
- 7700 Hybrid low-floor citybus (B5LH chassis)
- 7800 articulated BRT bus (B9S Articulated chassis) – for China
- 7900 low-floor citybus
- 7900 Hybrid low-floor citybus (B5LH chassis)
- 7900A Hybrid articulated low-floor citybus (B5LAH chassis)
- 8300 intercity (B9R chassis) – for Mexico
- 8400 citybus (B7RLE chassis) – for India
- 8500 TX intercity (B7R/B12M chassis)
- 8500A articulated intercity (B12MA chassis)
- 8500LE citybus (B10BLE/B7RLE/B12BLE/B9S Articulated chassis)
- 8600 (B8R chassis) – for Europe, built in India
- 8700 TX intercity (B7R/B12B/B12M chassis)
- 8700LE citybus (B7RLE/B12BLE chassis)
- 8700LEA articulated citybus (B12BLEA chassis)
- 8900 intercity (B7R/B9R/B8R chassis)
- 8900LE citybus (B7RLE/B9RLE/B8RLE chassis)
- 9100 coach – for Asia, built in India
- 9300 coach (B9R chassis) – for Mexico
- 9400 intercity (B7R/B8R/B9R chassis) – for India
- 9400XL(6X2) intercity (B9R chassis) – for India
- 9400PX coach (B11R chassis) – for India
- 9500 coach (B9R/B8R chassis)
- 9600 coach (B9R chassis) – for China
- 9600 coach (B8R chassis) – for India
- 9700 TX intercity/coach (B12B/B12M/B7R/B9R/B13R/B11R/B8R chassis)
- 9800 coach (B12M chassis) – for China
- 9800 coach (B13R chassis) – for Mexico
- 9800 Double Decker coach (B13R chassis) – for Mexico
- 9900 coach (B12B/B13R/B11R chassis)

== Acquired companies ==
Bus makers owned/acquired by Volvo:

- Säffle Karosseri AB, Säffle, Sweden (1981, known as Volvo Bussar Säffle AB from 2004, plant closed in 2013)
- Leyland Bus, United Kingdom (1988, all Leyland products ceased production by July 1993)
- Steyr Bus GmbH, Steyr, Austria (75% in 1990, plant closed in the 1990s)
- Aabenraa Karrosseri A/S, Aabenraa, Denmark (1994, plant closed in 2004)
- Drögmöller Karosserien GmbH & Co. KG, Heilbronn, Germany (1994, later known as Volvo Busse Industries (Deutschland) GmbH, plant closed in 2005)
- Prevost Coaches, Quebec, Canada (1995), now known as Prevost Car
- Merkavim, Israel (1996), jointly owned by Volvo Bus Corporation & Mayer Cars & Trucks Ltd., importer of HONDA cars & bikes in Israel
- Volvo Polska Sp. z o.o., Wrocław, Poland (1996), the largest Volvo Buses factory in Europe
- Carrus Oy, Finland (January 1998, known as Volvo Bus Finland Oy from 2004)
  - Carrus Oy Delta, Lieto, known as Volvo Bus Finland Oy Turku Factory from 2004, became independent in 2008 and renamed Carrus Delta Oy
  - Carrus Oy Ajokki, Tampere, known as Volvo Bus Finland Oy Tampere Factory from 2004, plant closed in 2008
  - Carrus Oy Wiima, Vantaa, plant closed in 2001
- Nova Bus, St-Eustache, Quebec, Canada (1998)
- Mexicana de Autobuses SA (MASA), Tultitlán, Mexico (1998), renamed Volvo Buses de México
- Alfa Busz Kft, Székesfehérvár, Hungary, (2002)
- EUROBUS, Zagreb, Croatia (1994.-1999.) on chassis B10, B12
- Proterra (2023)

== Production sites ==
- Sainte-Claire, Quebec, Canada
- Saint-Eustache, Quebec, Canada
- Borås, Sweden
- Hoskote, India
- Curitiba, Brazil
- Wrocław, Poland
- Tultitlán, Mexico

== Gallery ==
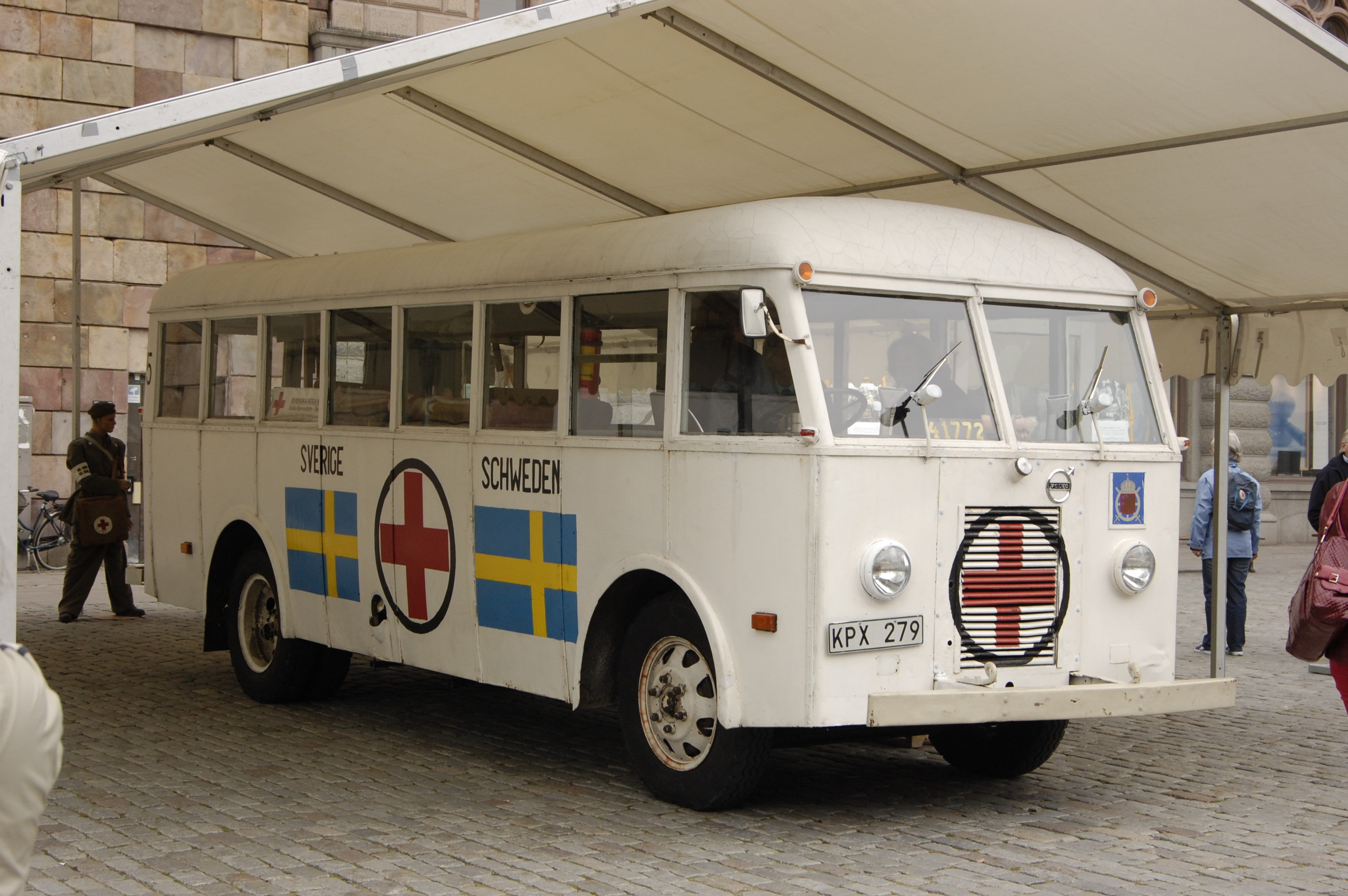
Volvo bus used in White Buses action of 1945

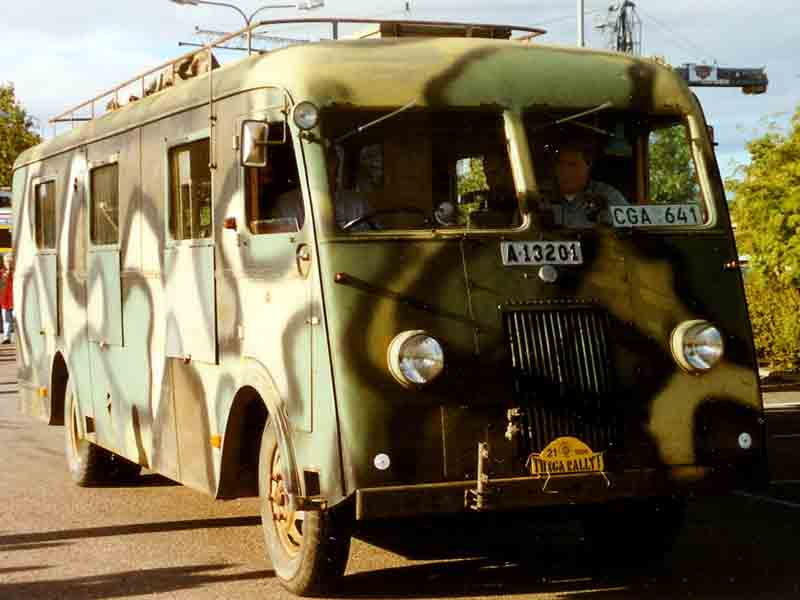
Volvo B12 Bus 1940

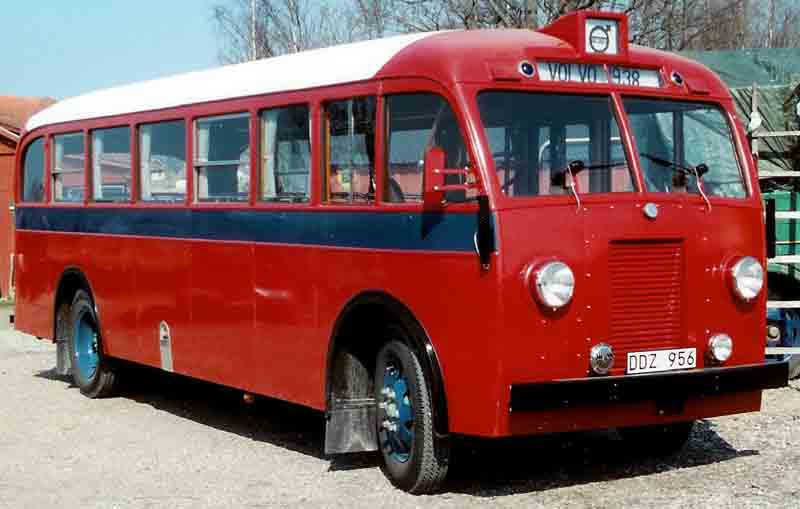
Volvo B10 Bus 1938

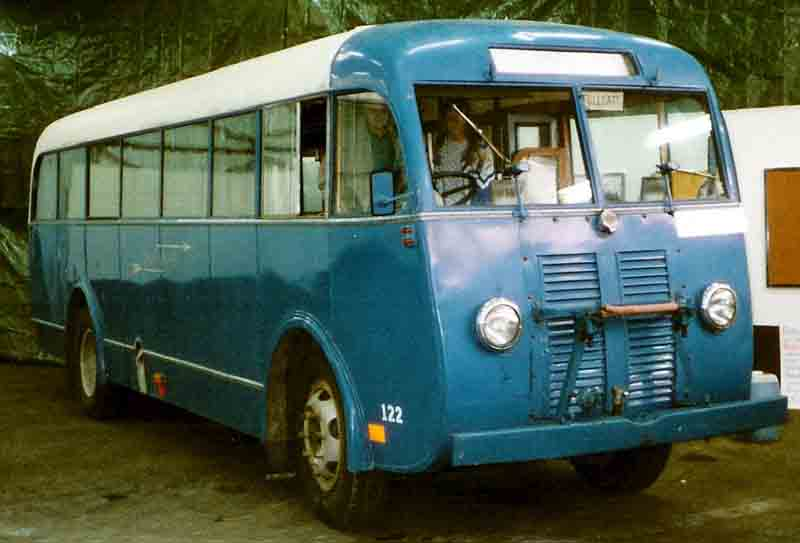
Volvo B512 Bus 1948

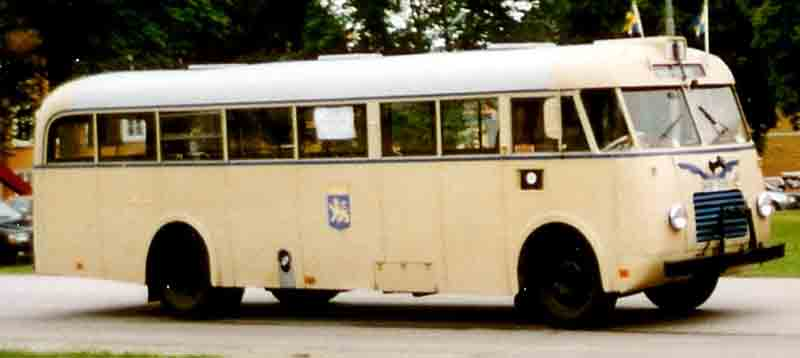
Volvo B513X Bus 1948

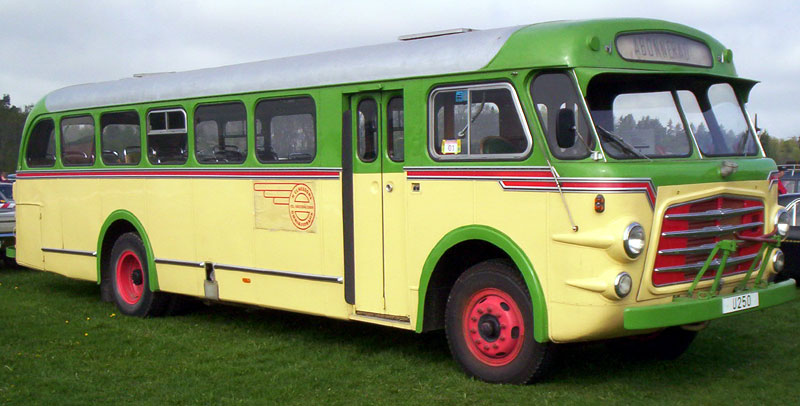
Volvo B617 Bus 1952

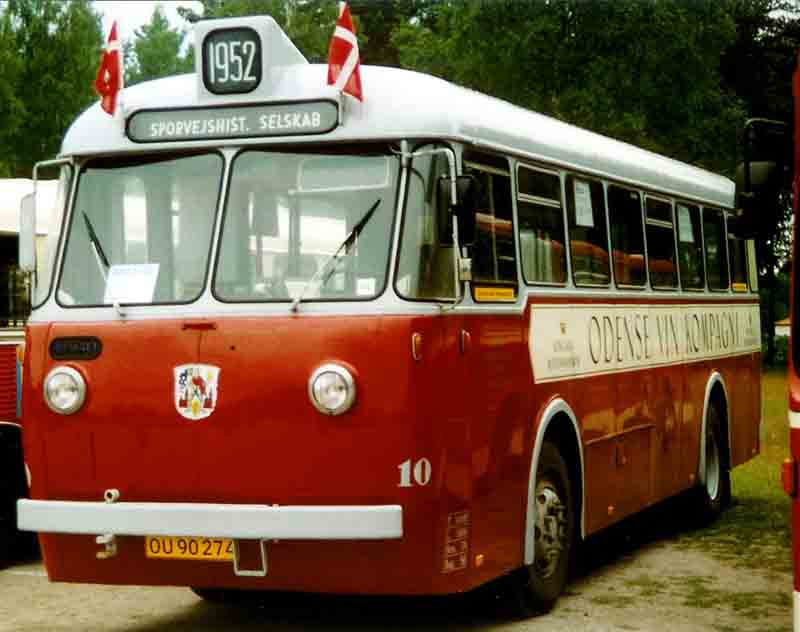
Volvo B655 Bus 1952

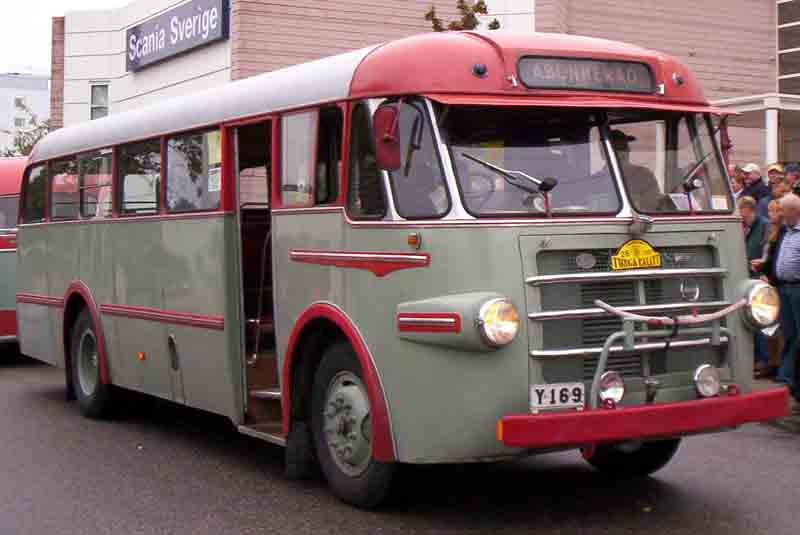
Volvo Bus 1953

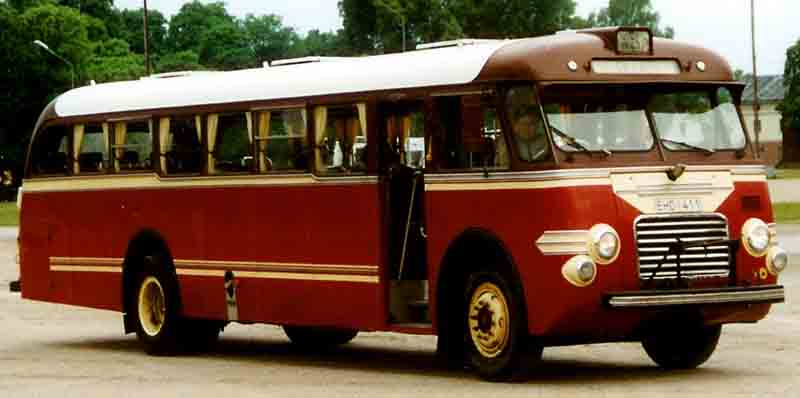
Volvo B638 Bus 1953

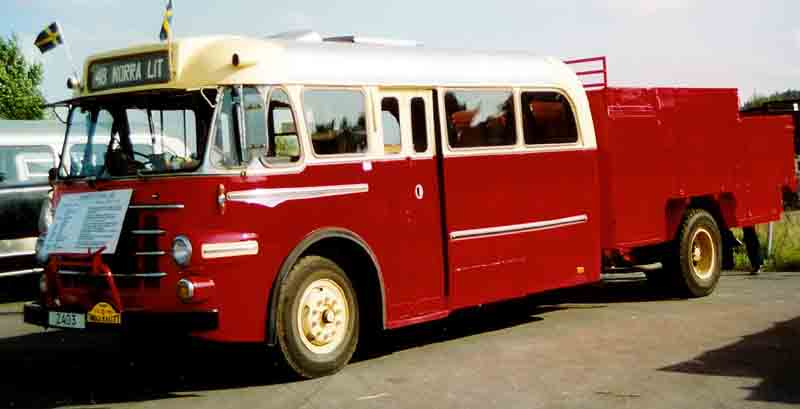
Volvo B727 Bus 1953

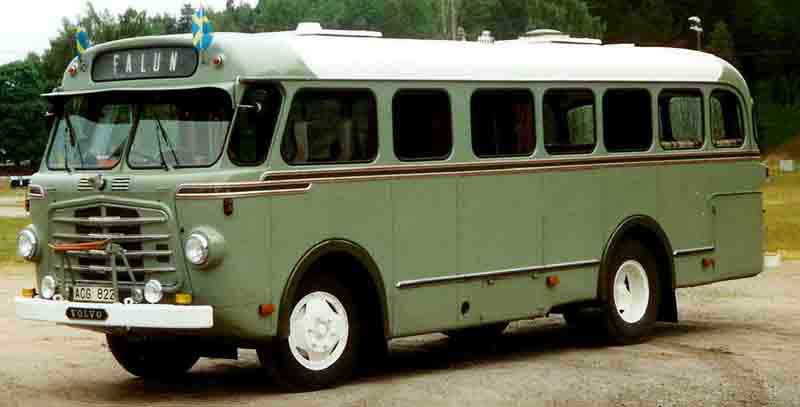
Volvo B70501 Bus 1959

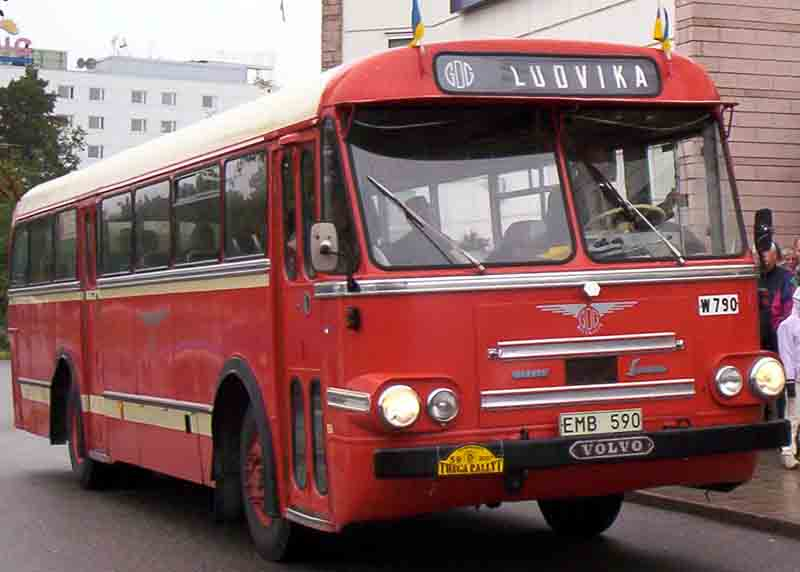
Volvo B655 Bus 1963

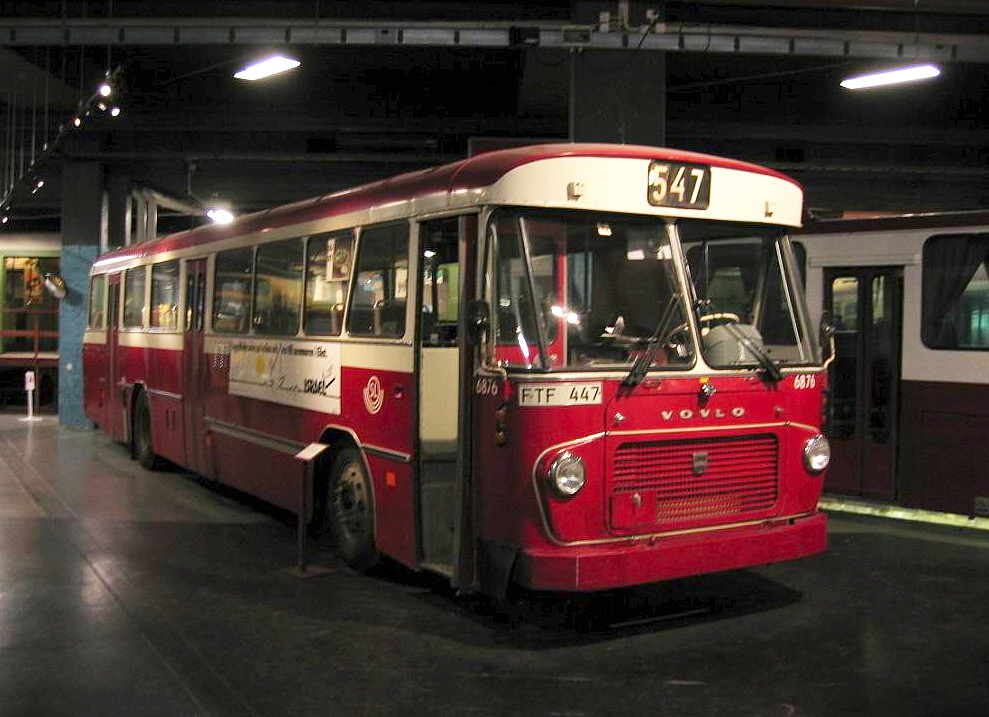
1967 Volvo B58 bus

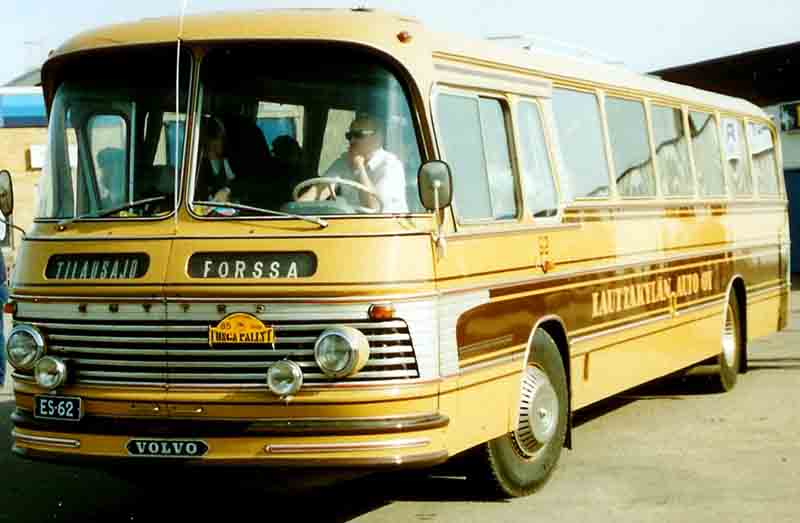
Volvo B58 Bus 1968

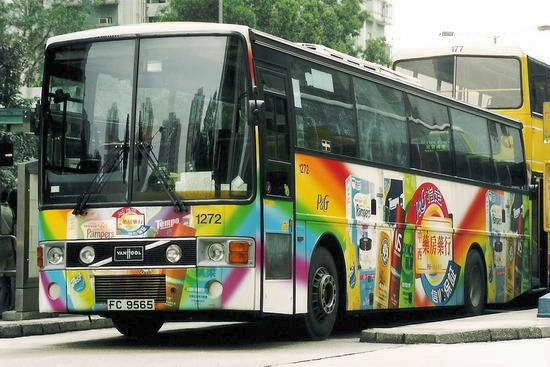
A Van Hool-bodied Volvo B10M single-deck coach

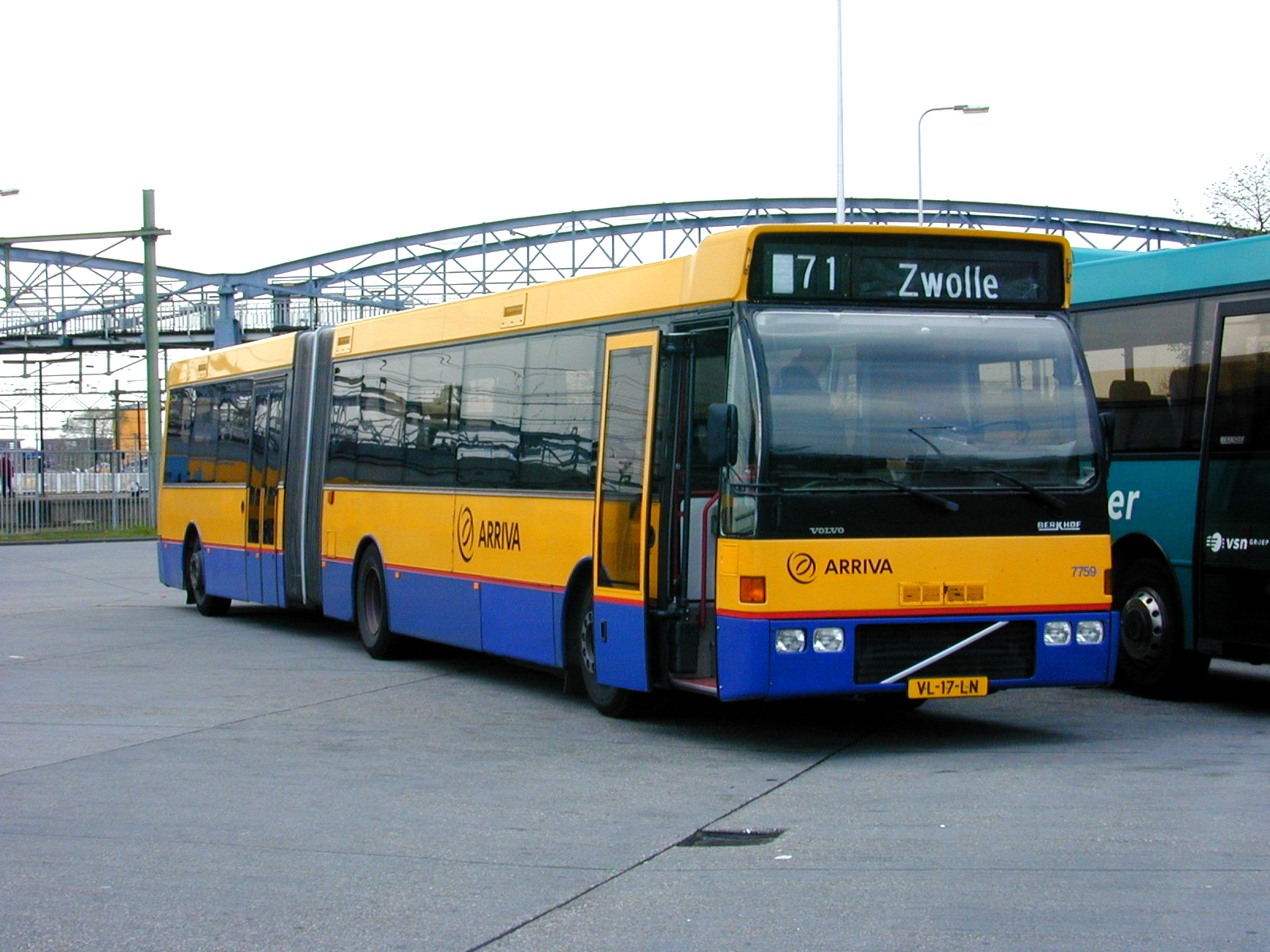
Volvo B10MA, 1985

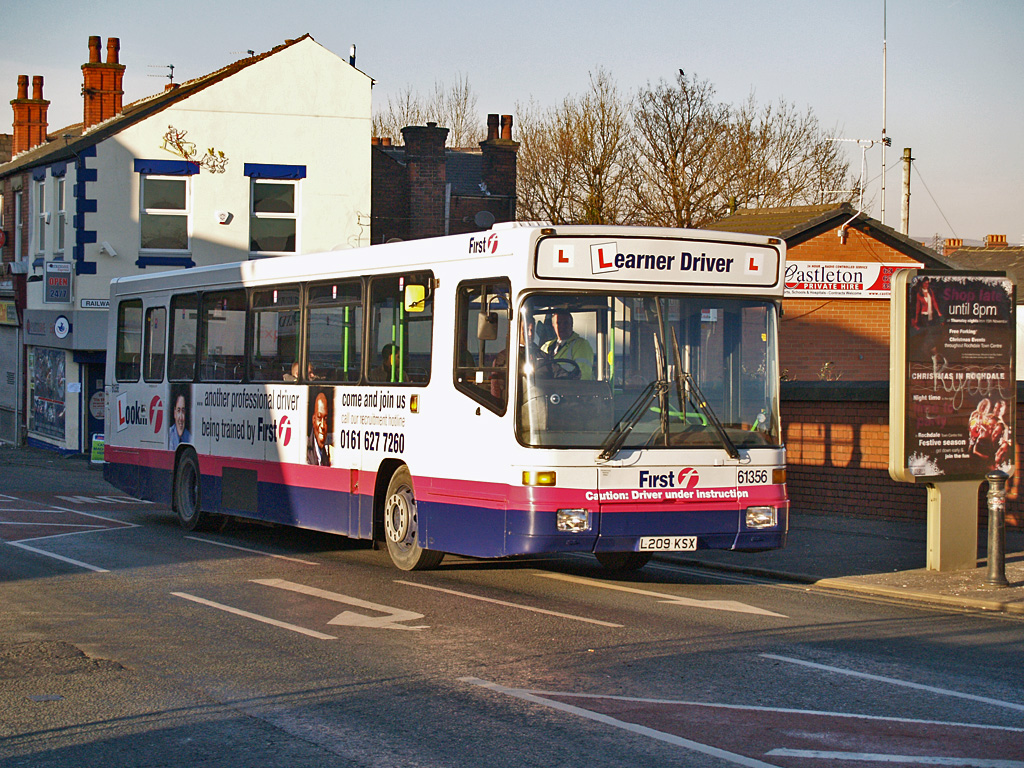
A 1993 built B10B bus with Alexander Strider bodywork, pictured as a training bus for First Greater Manchester

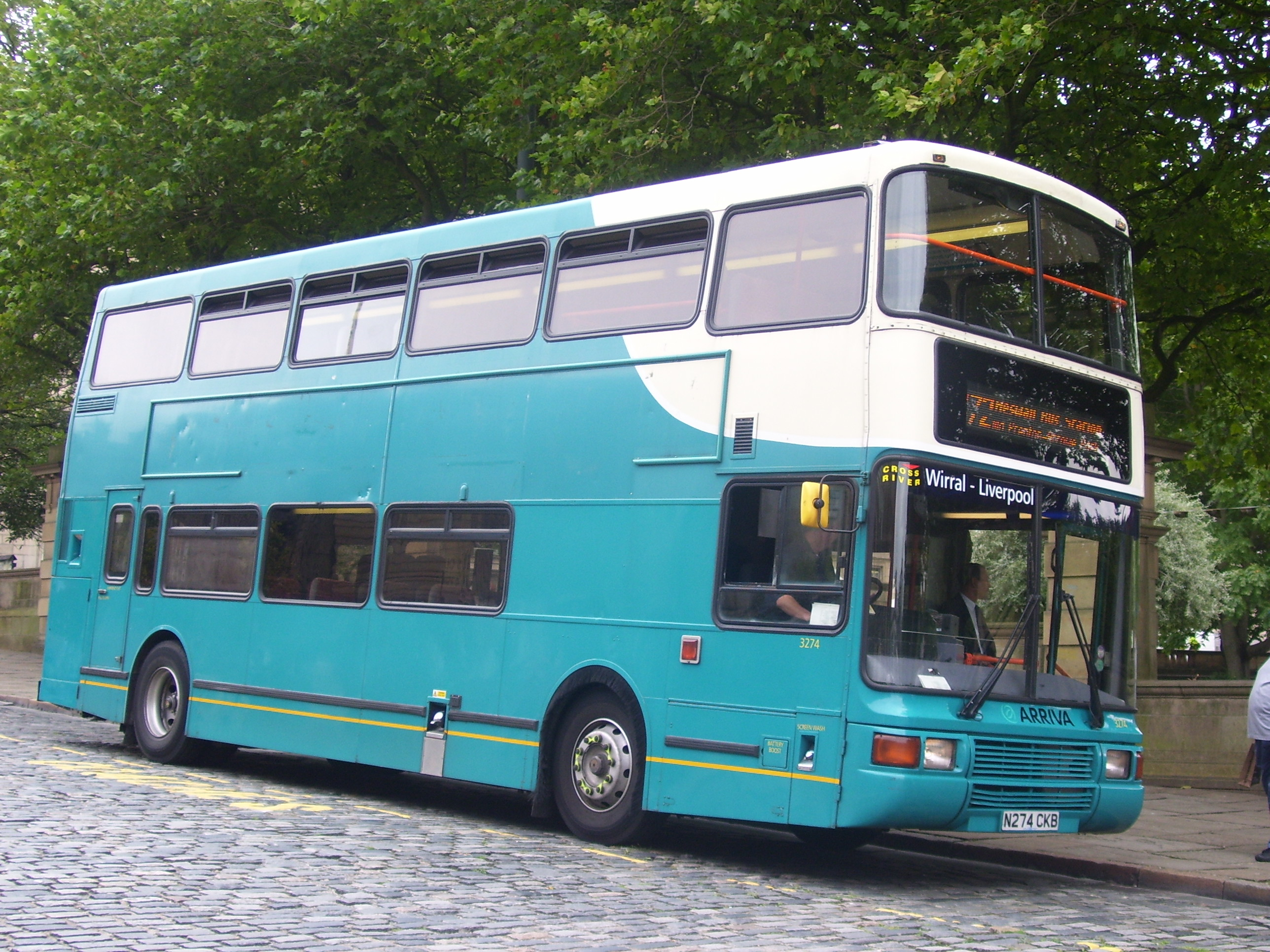
Volvo Olympian, 2007

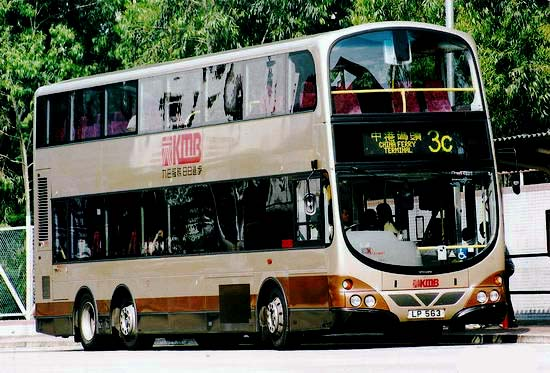
Volvo Super Olympian, 2006

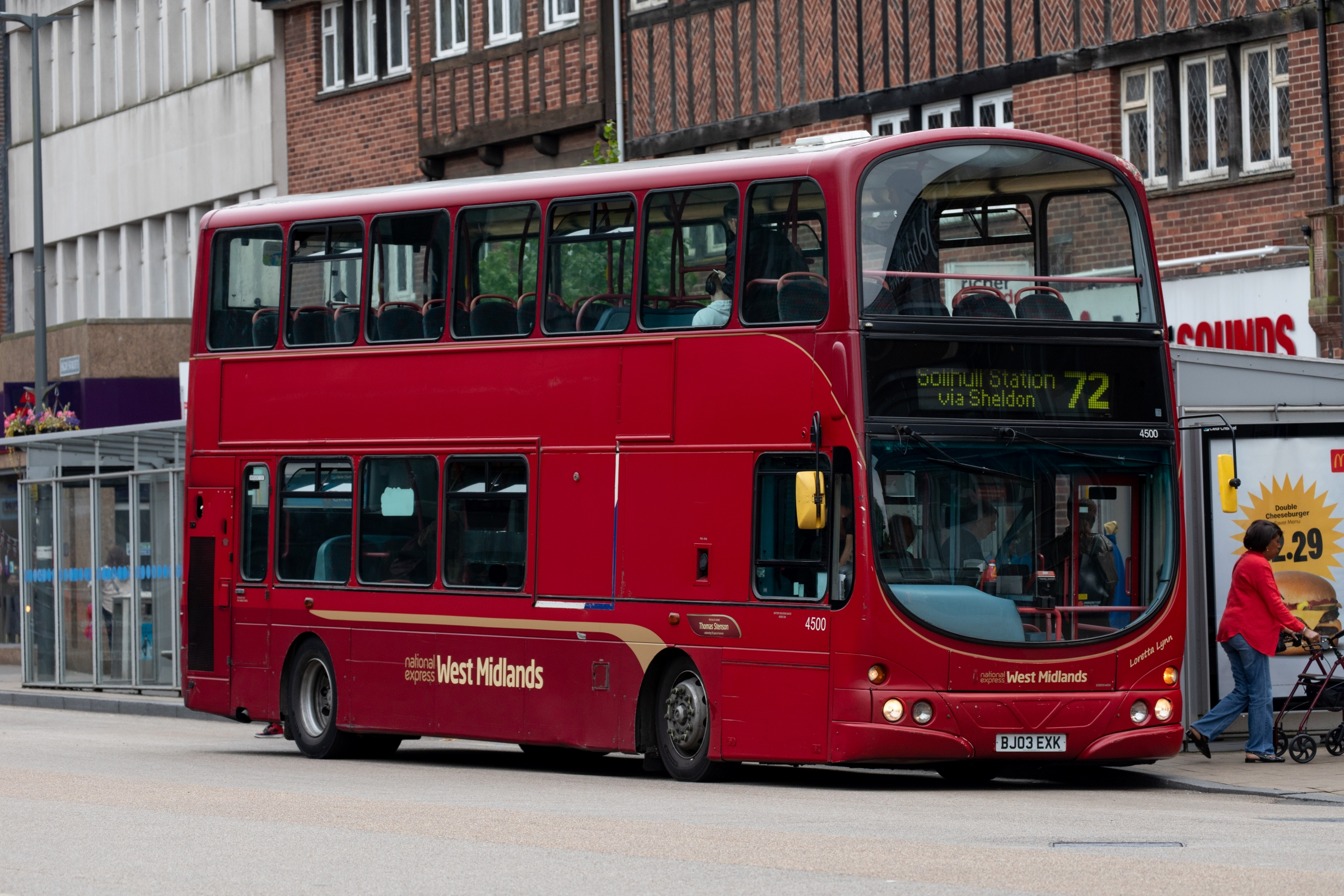
Volvo B7TL, 2024

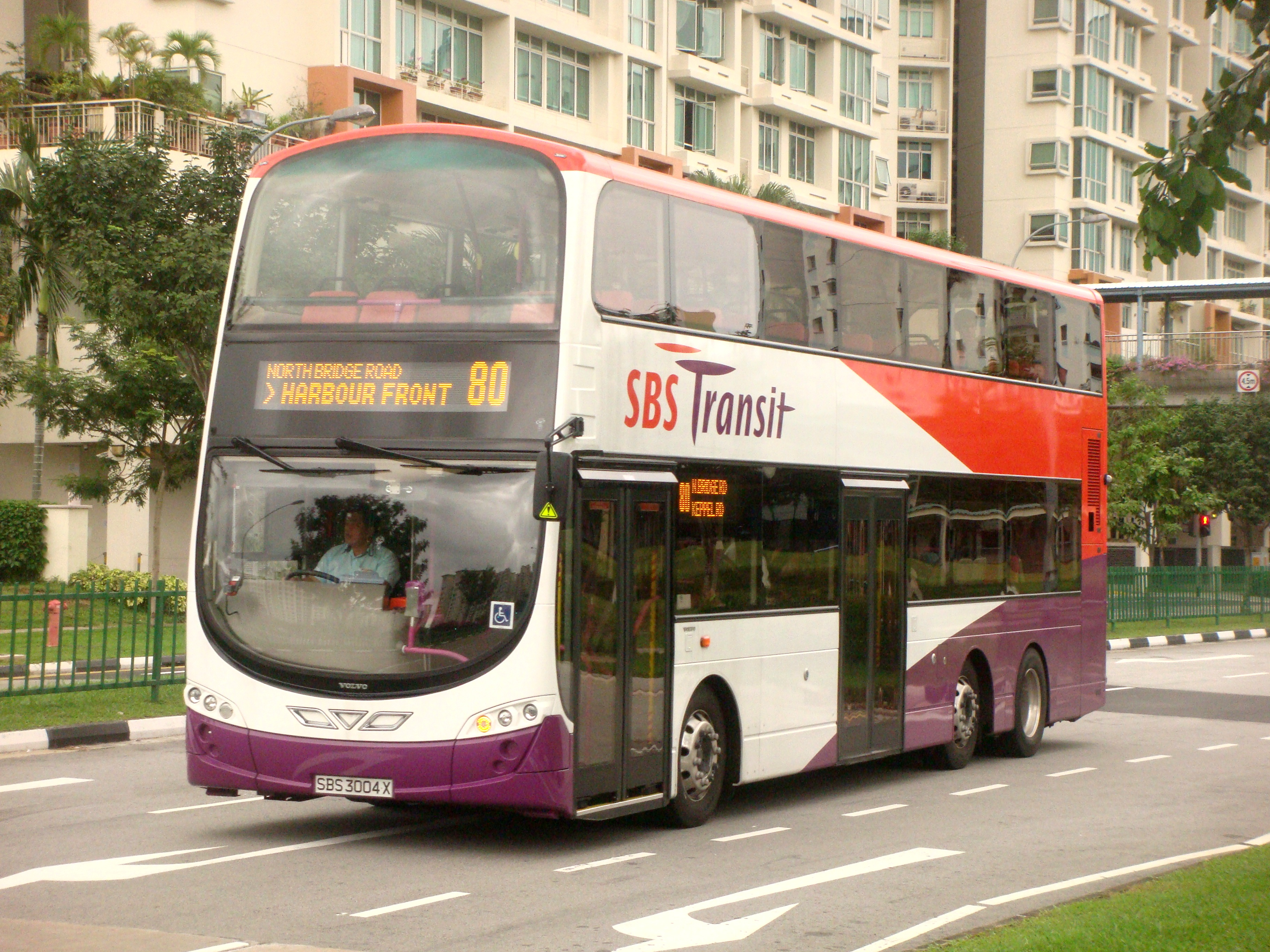
Volvo B9TL, 2012

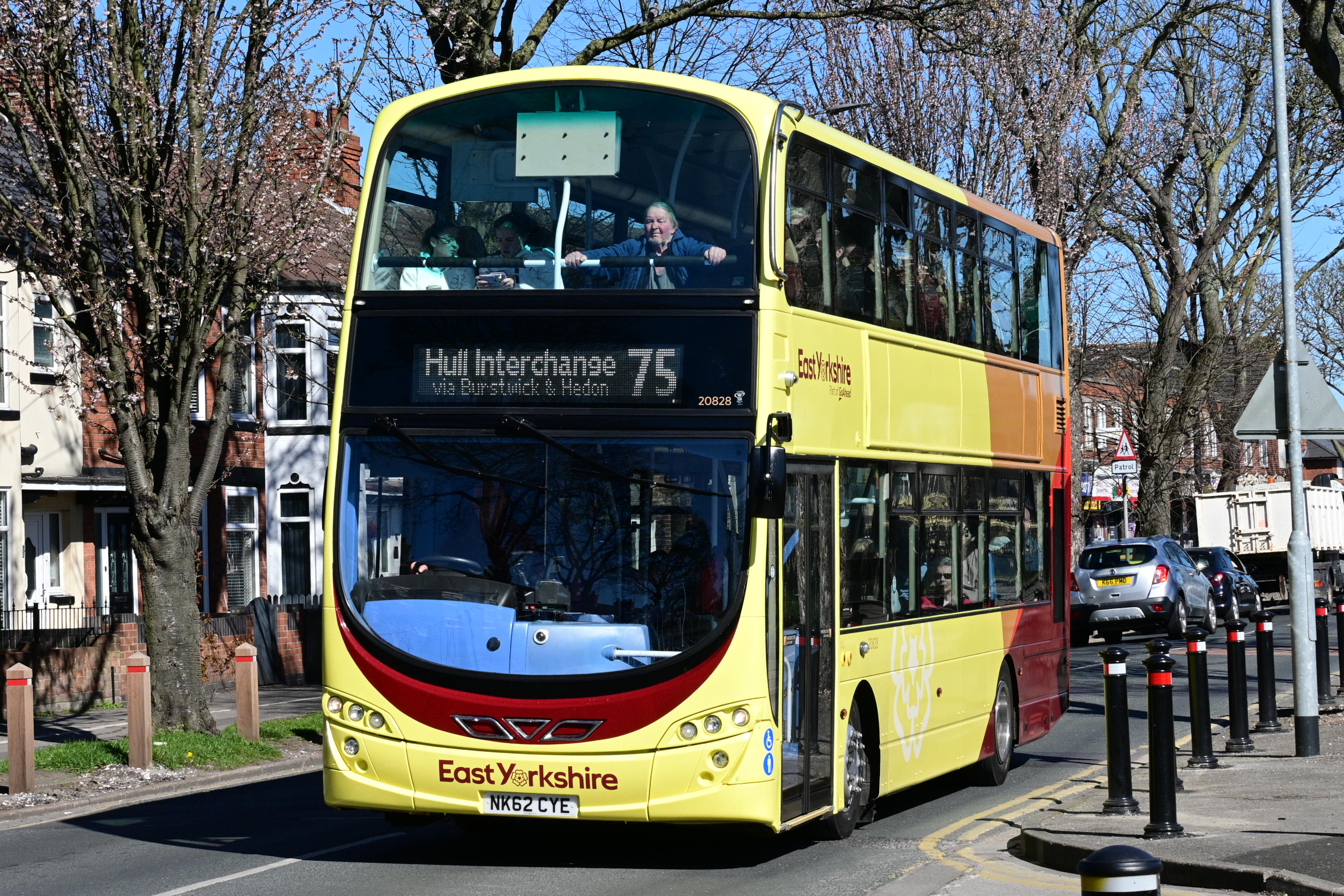
Volvo B5LH, 2025

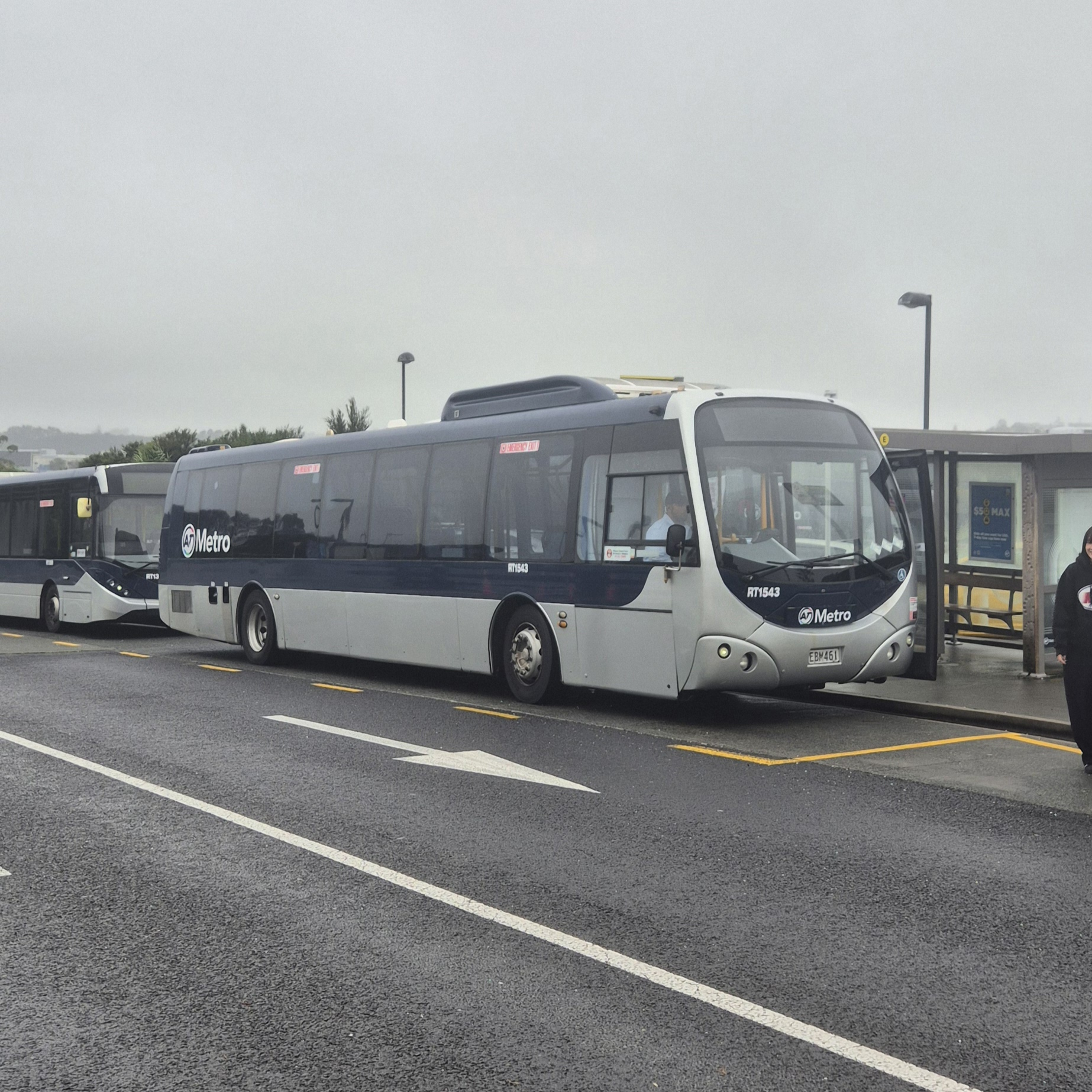
Volvo B7RLE, 2025

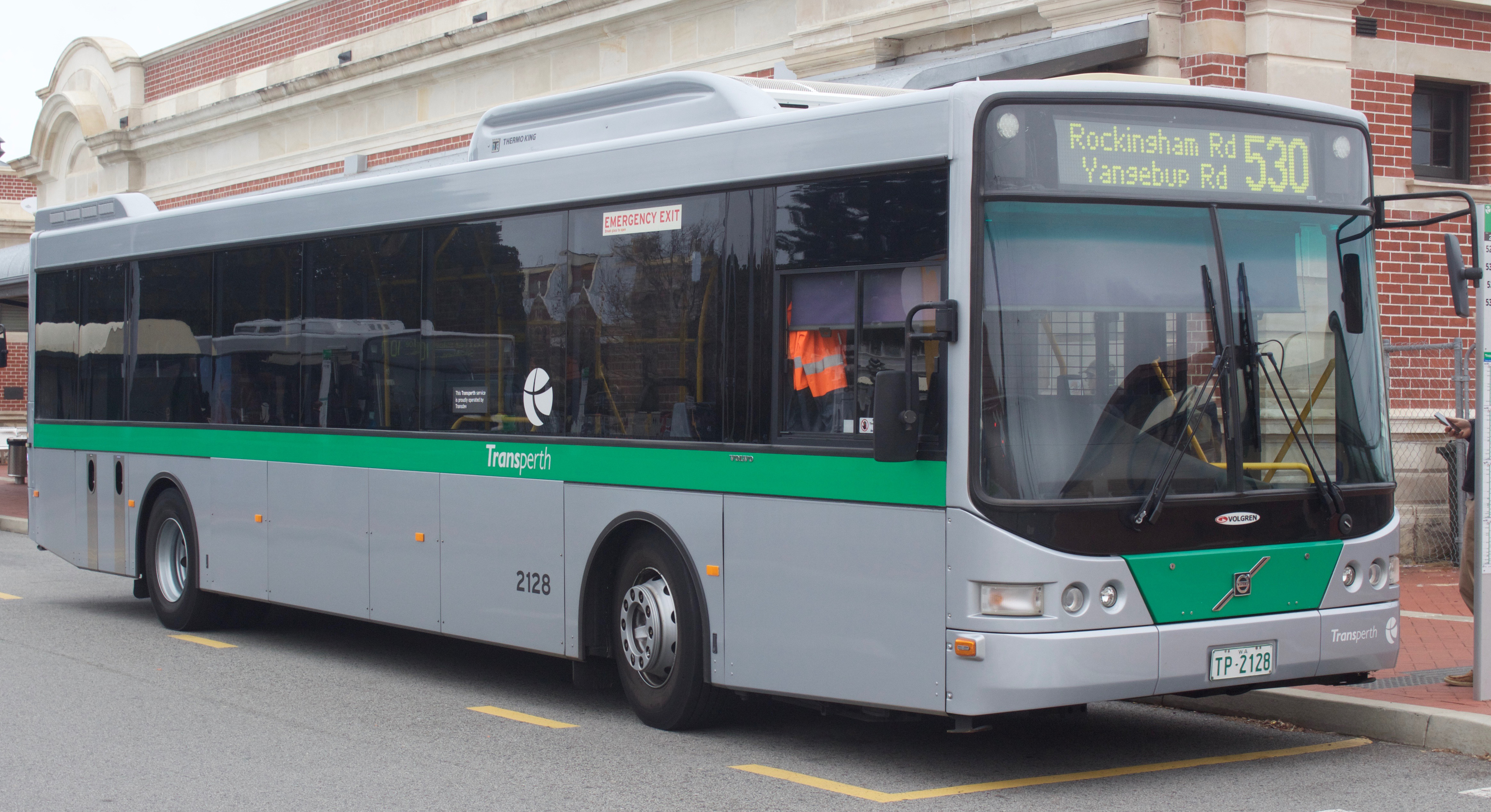
Volvo B7RLE, 2017

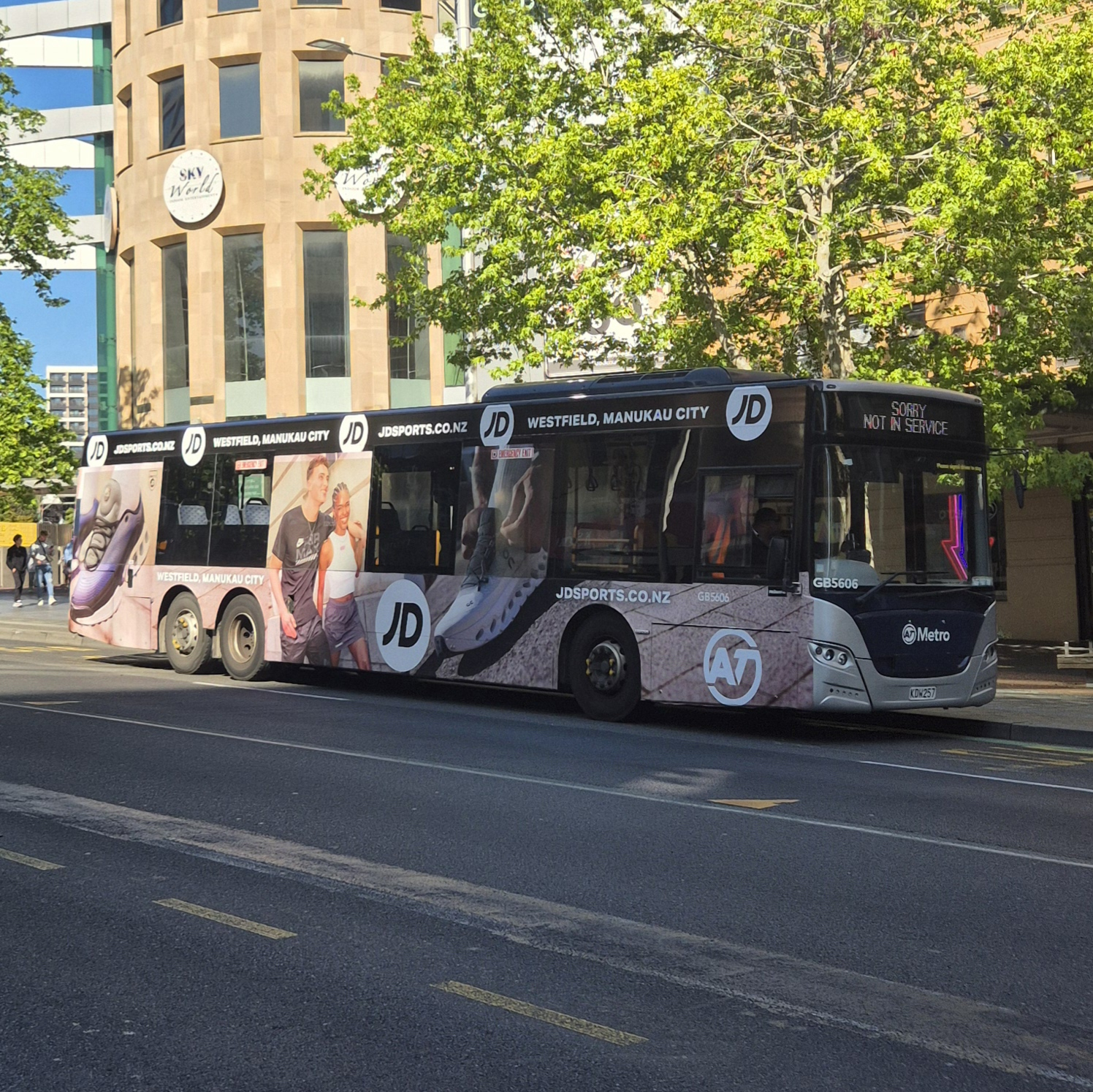
Volvo B7RLE, 2024

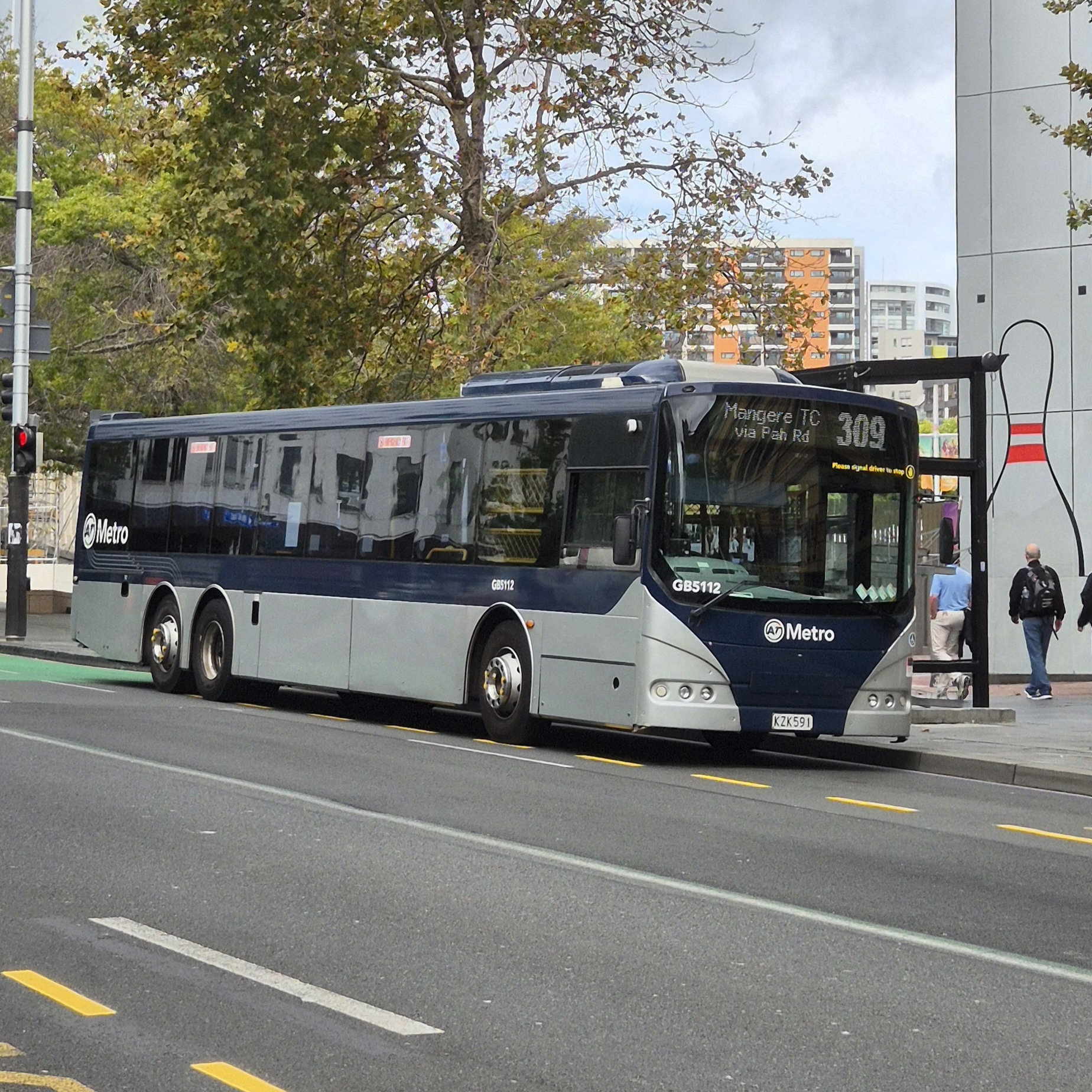
Volvo B7RLE, 2025

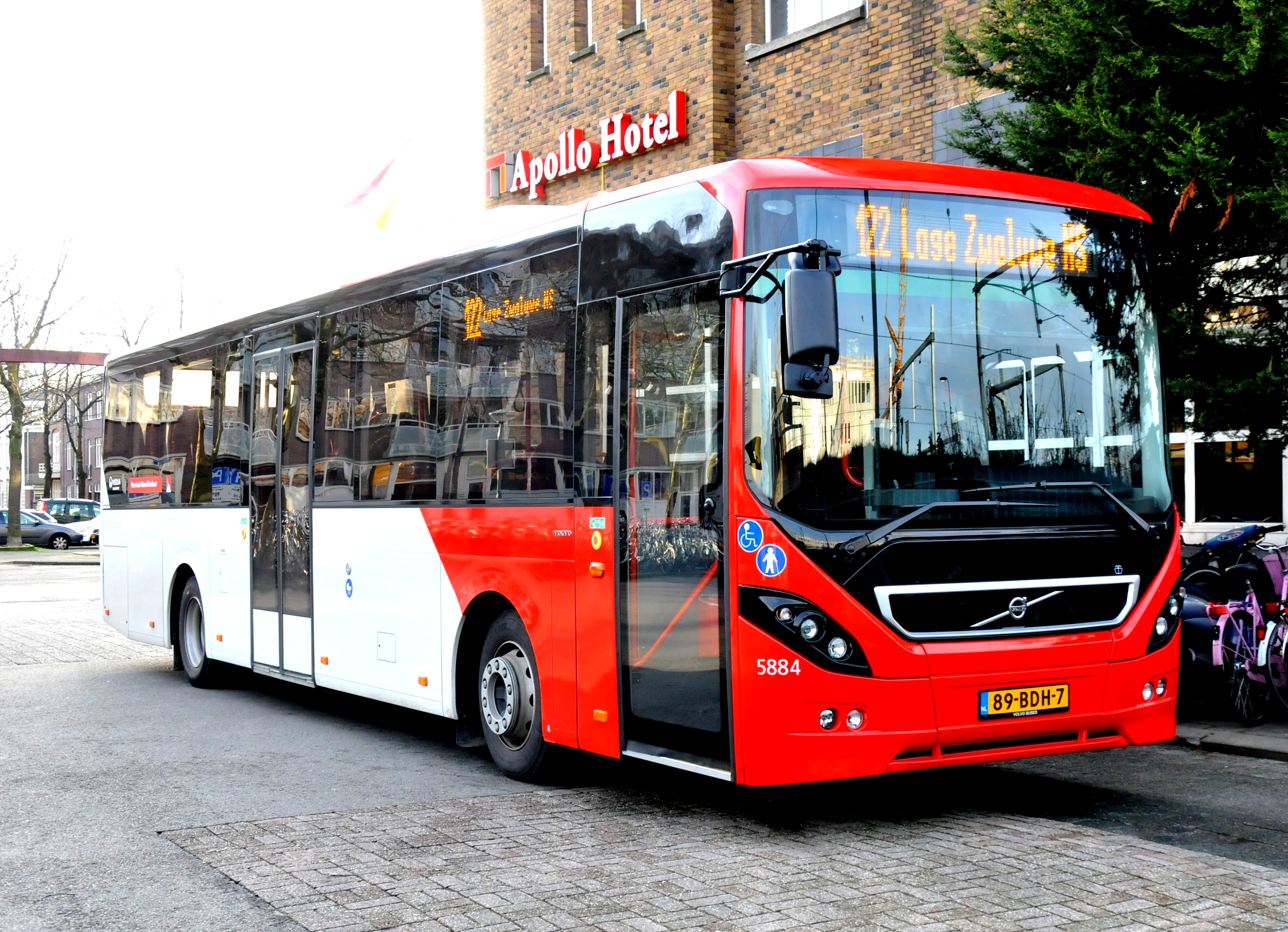
Volvo B8RLE, 2014

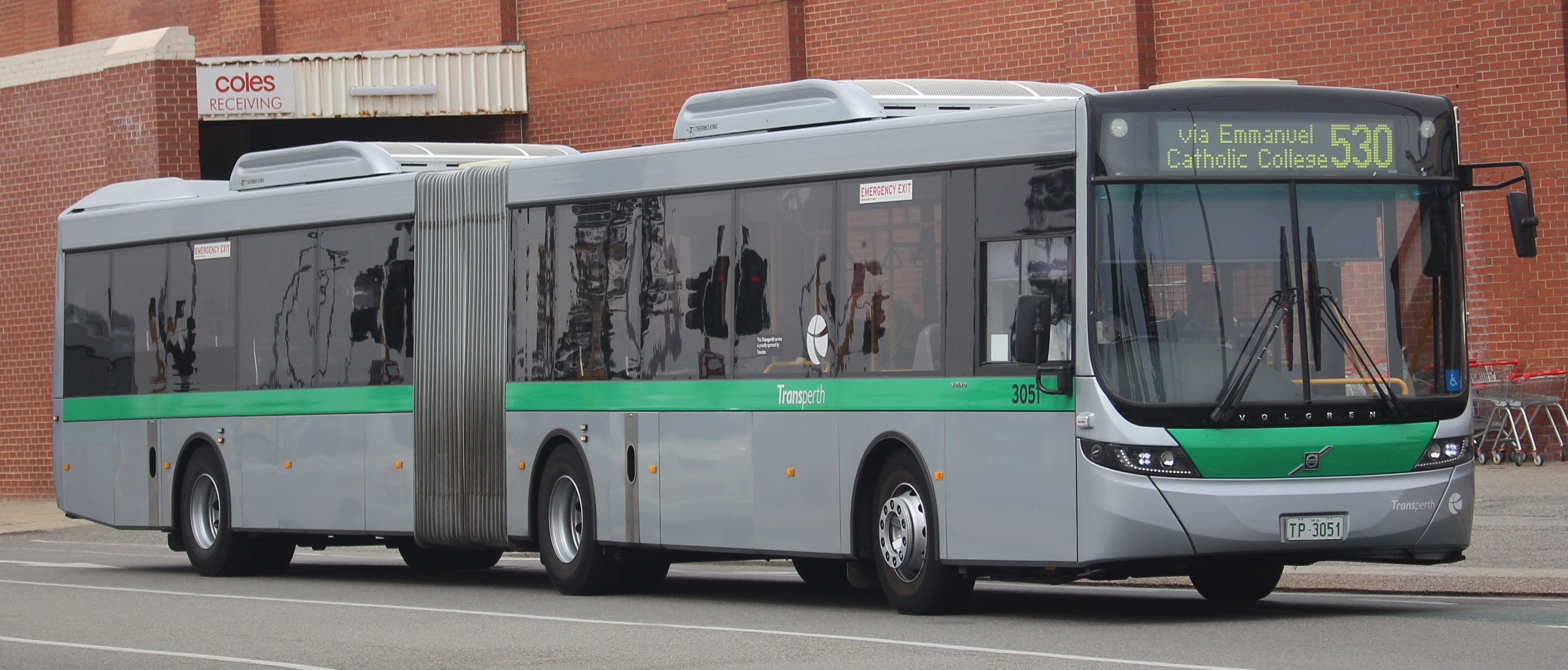
Volvo B8RLEA, 2018

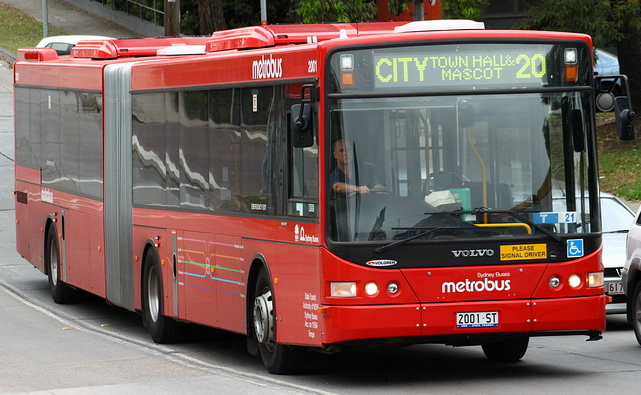
Volvo B12BLEA, 2009

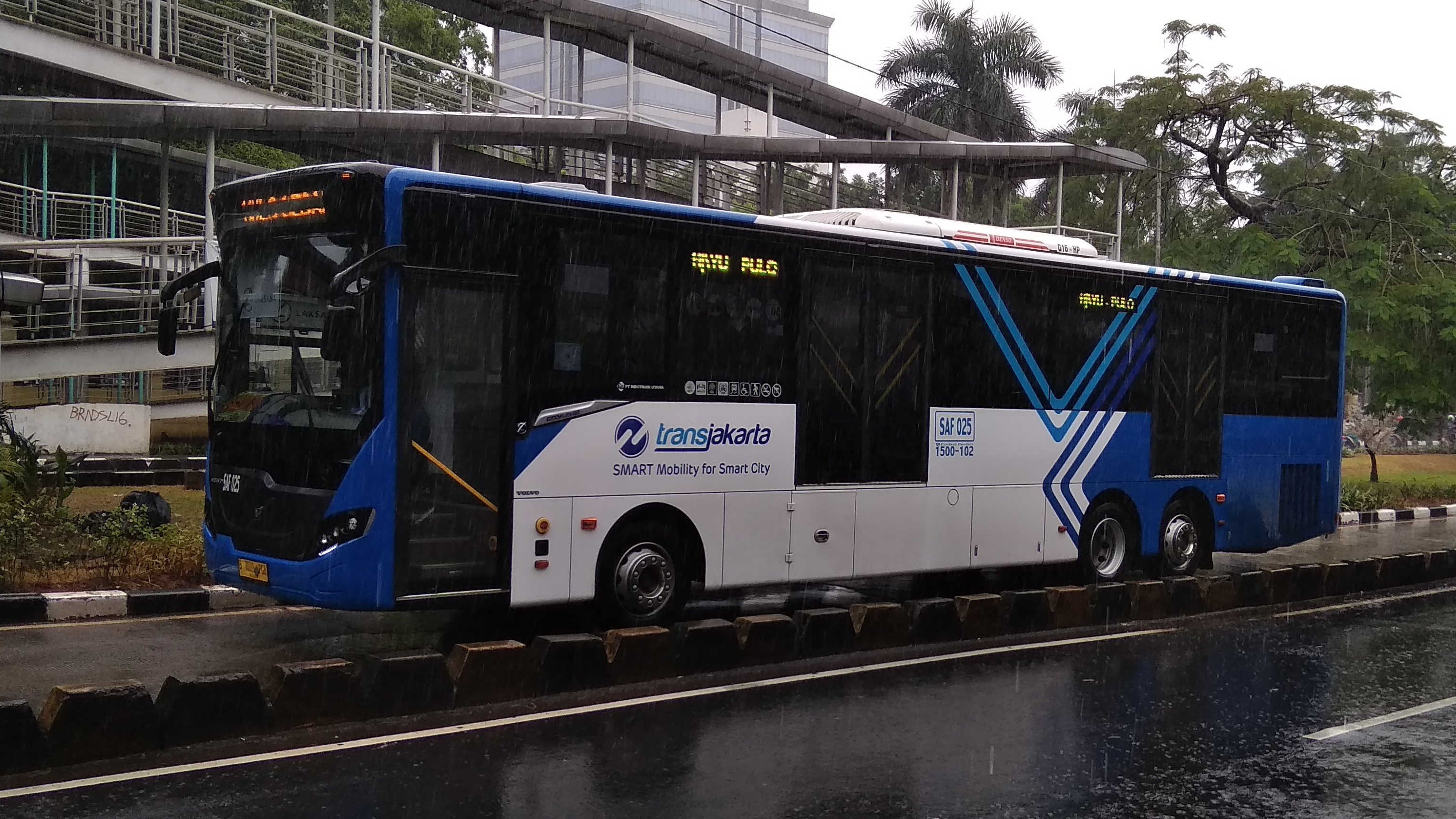
Volvo B11R, 2018

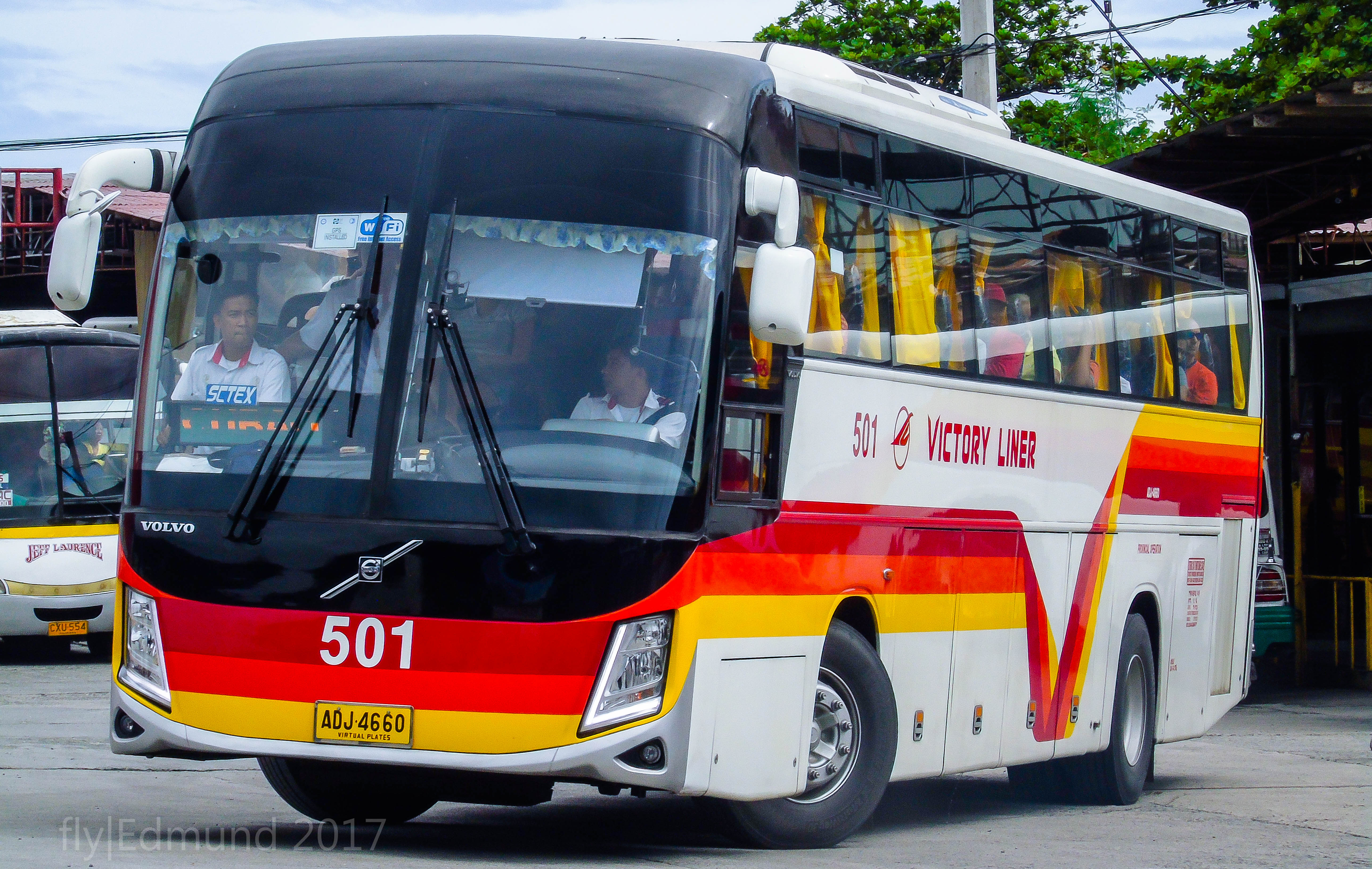
Volvo B7R, body made by Autodelta Coach Builders Inc., 2017

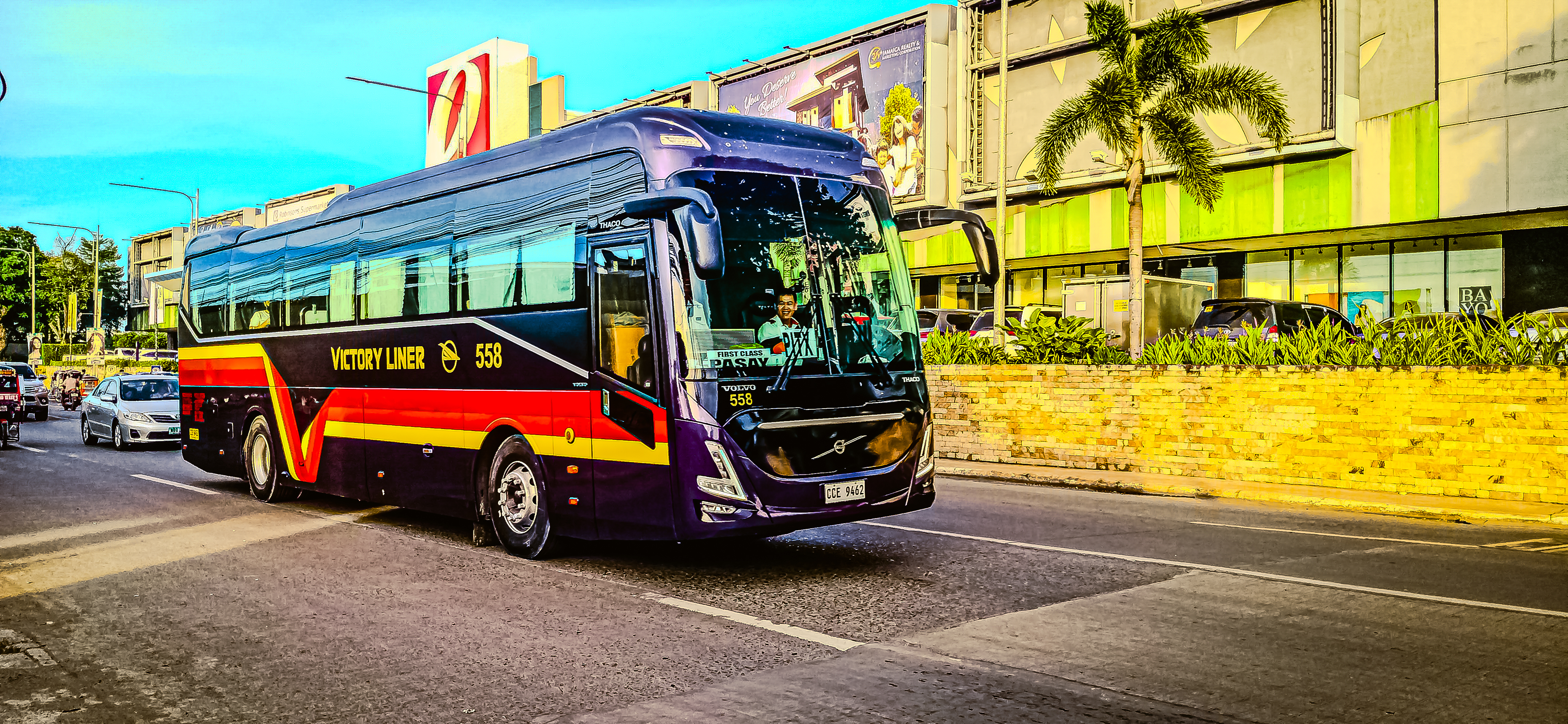
Volvo B8R, body made by Truong Hai Group Corporation, 2024

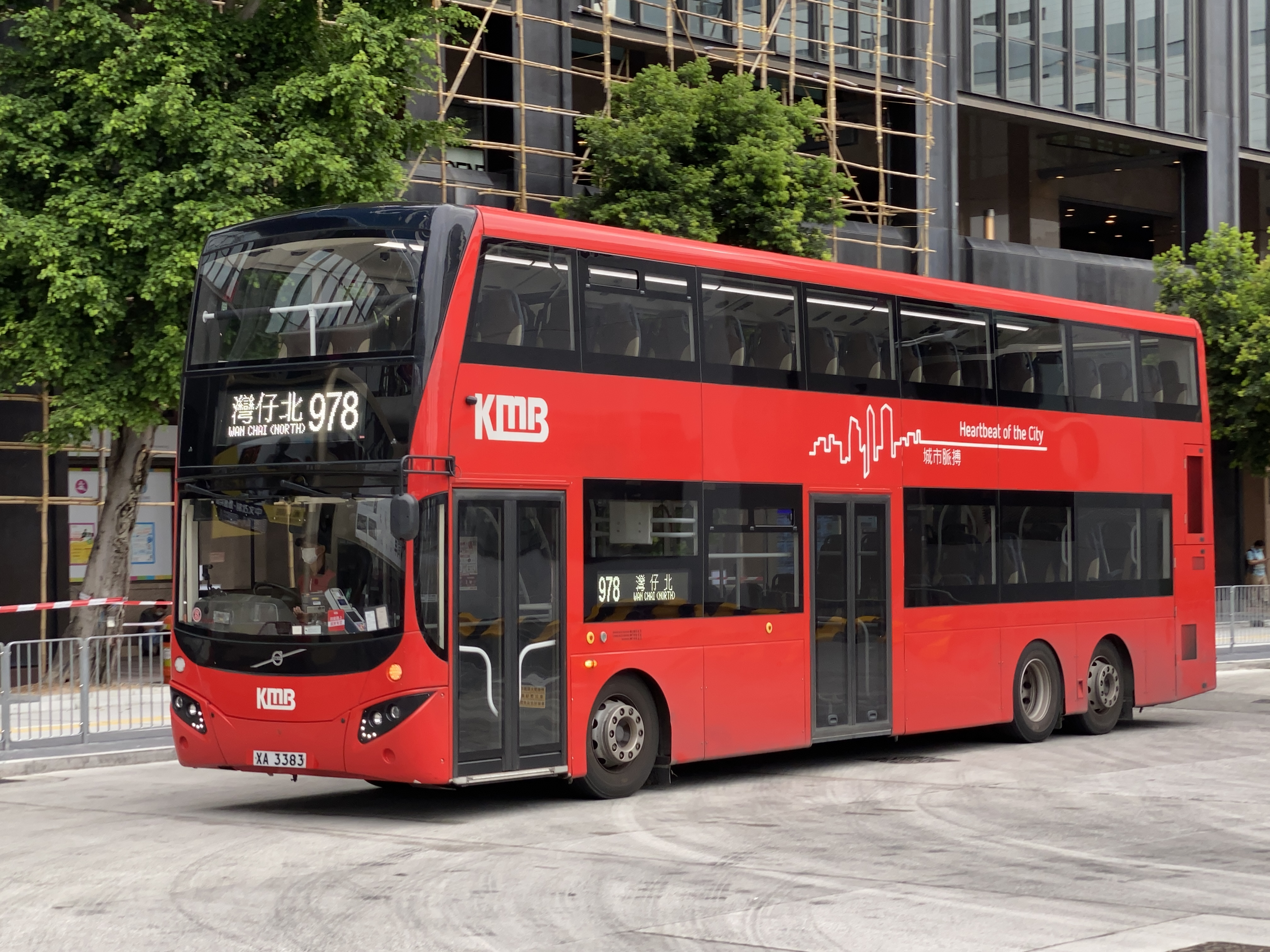
Volvo B8L, 2022

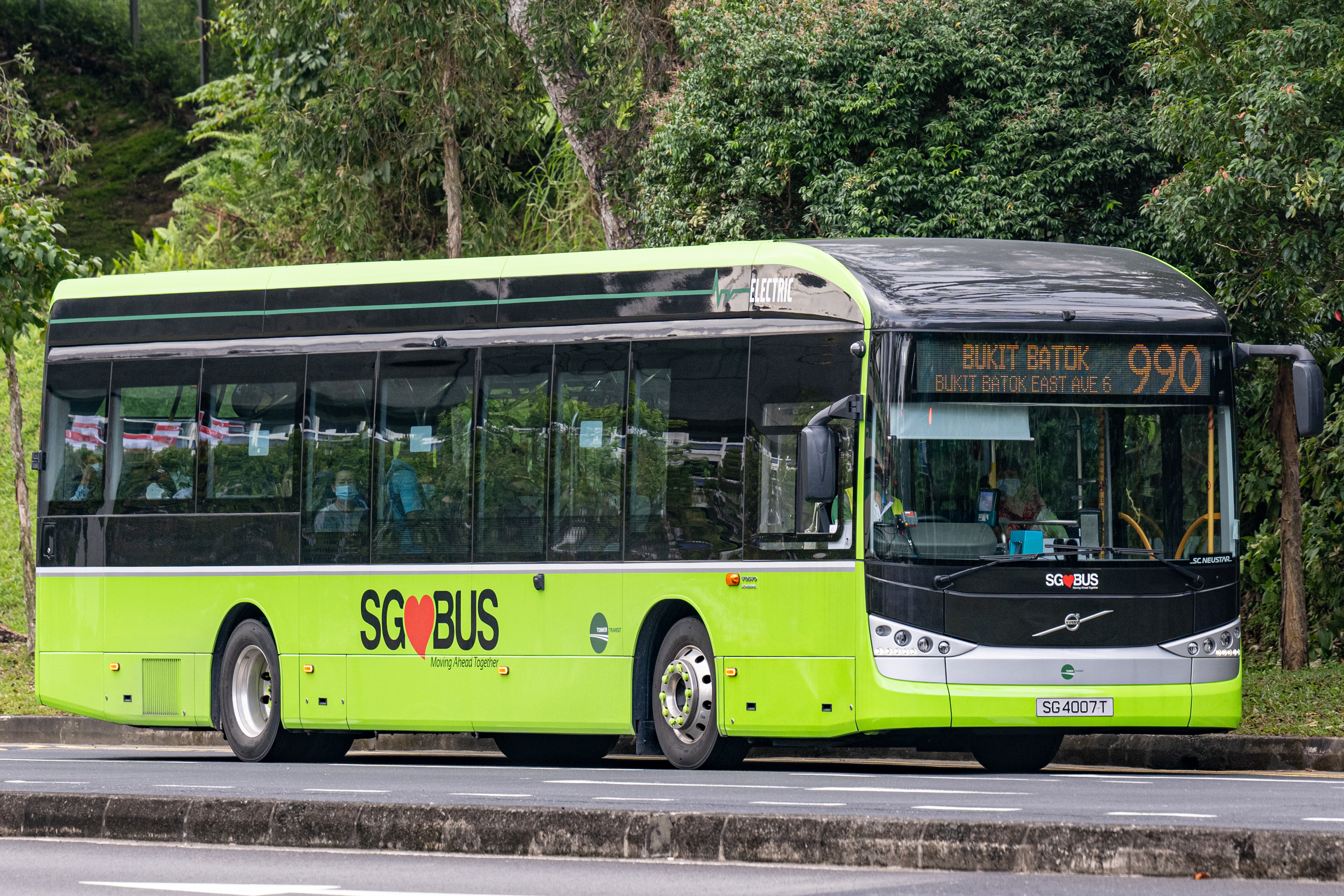
Volvo BZL, 2023

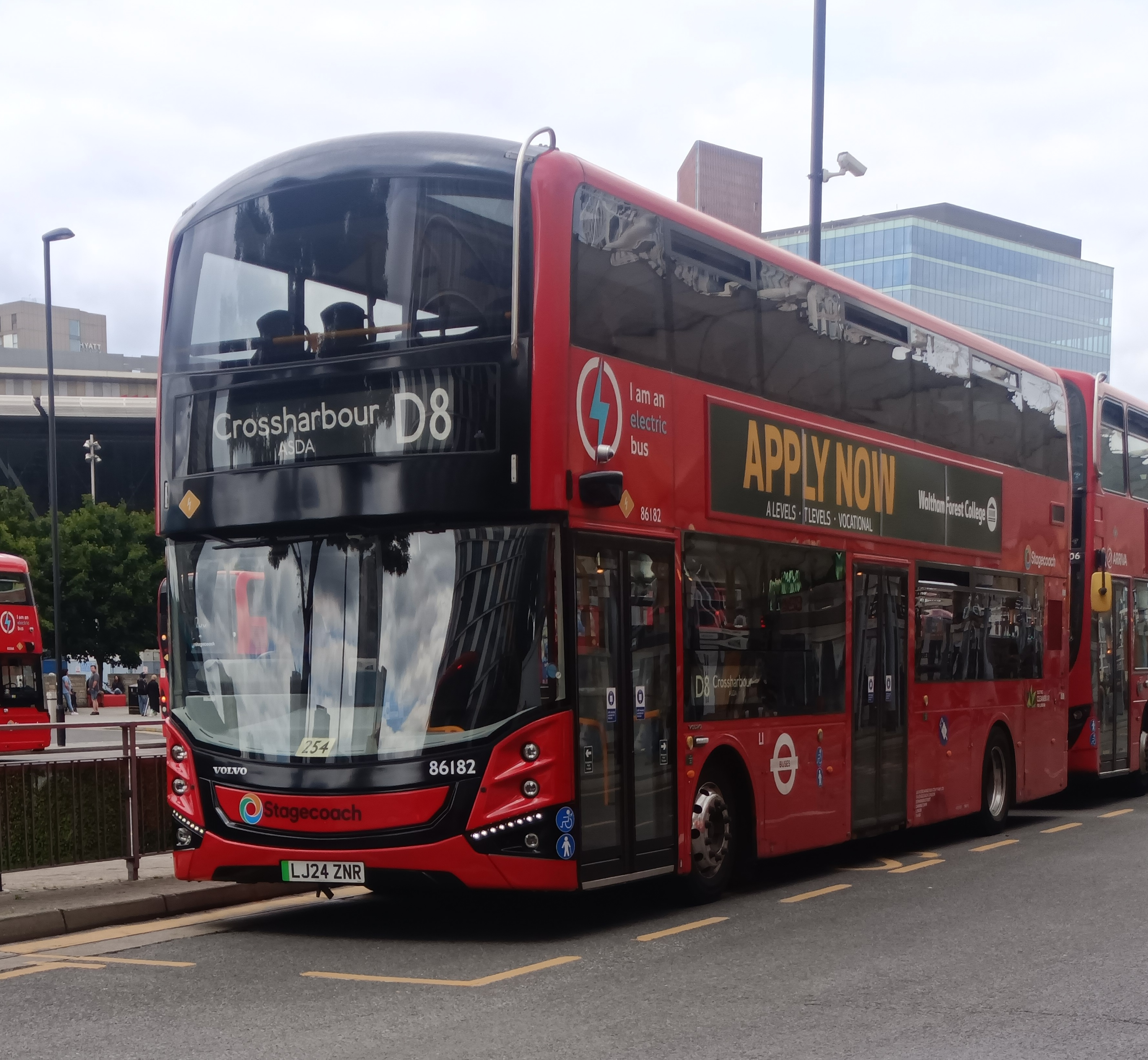
Volvo BZL, 2025
