= Volvo B9S =

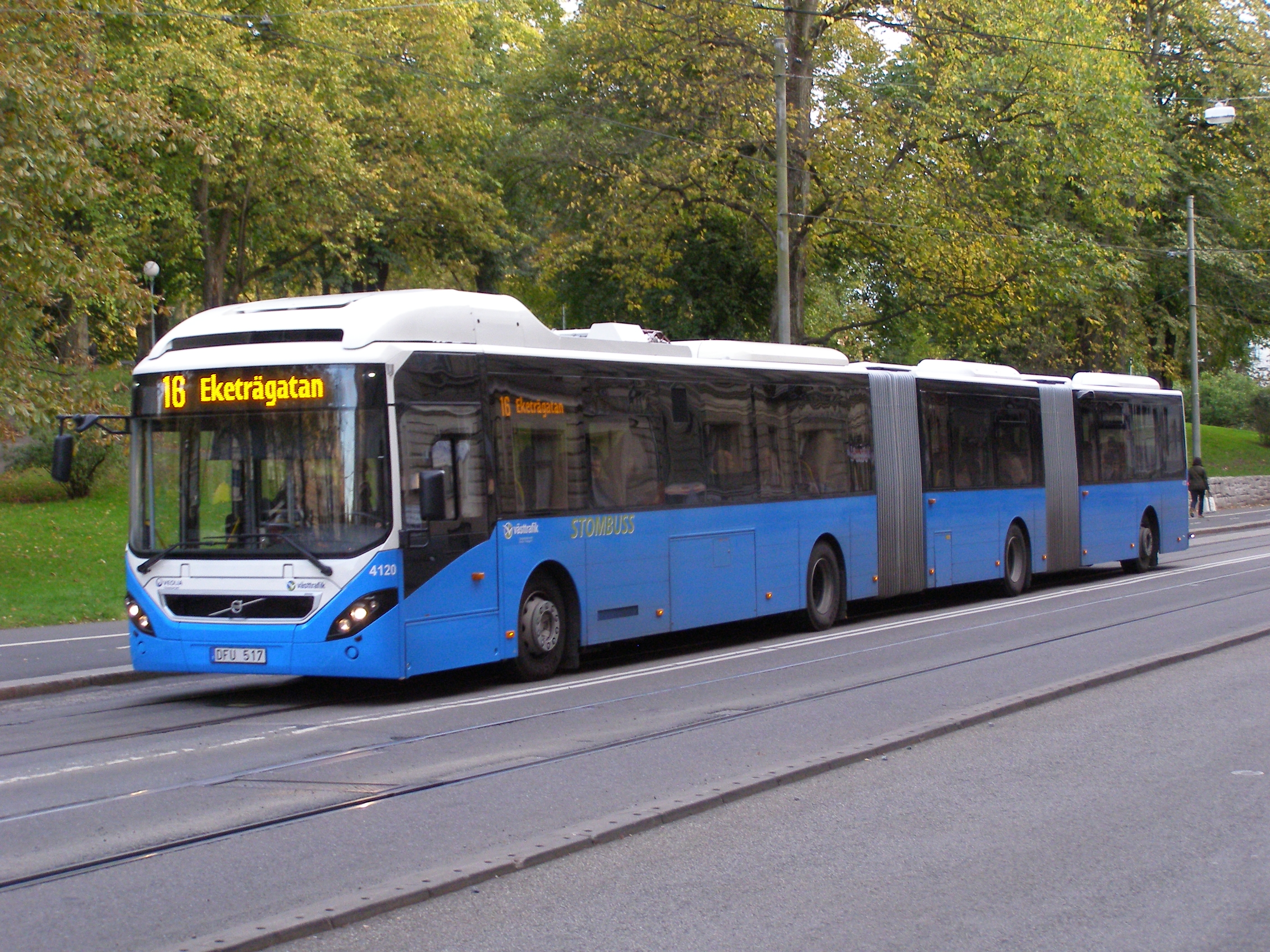
- Bi-articulated Volvo B9SALF with Volvo 8900 bodywork in Gothenburg, Sweden

Overview
- Manufacturer: Volvo Buses
- Production: 2002 - 2011

Body and chassis
- Class: Commercial vehicle
- Body style: Articulated bus
- Floor type: Low floor
- Related: Volvo B360S

Powertrain
- Engine: 9-litre, vertical 6-cylinder in-line engine, mounted between the front axles on the left side

Dimensions
- Length: 18 to 27 metres
- Width: 2.55 metres

Chronology
- Predecessor: Volvo B7LA
- Successor: Volvo B9LA

The Volvo B9S was an articulated bus chassis constructed by Volvo Buses between 2002 and 2011. It was available as a low-entry bus (the B9SALE), a wholly low-floor bus (the B9SALF), and an integral bus bodied by Volvo (the 7500 or 8500).

The B9S was successful in few countries. It has been commercialized in Sweden, where it has been in use in the urban systems of Stockholm, Östergötland, Umeå and Gothenburg, being used there as a rapid transit buses; in Chile where it was a part of the biggest purchase order for Volvo buses: 1,159 articulated units entrusted for the urban system of Santiago; and in Brazil to be used in urban system of São Paulo by rapid transit corridors, in articulated and bi-articulated versions. Production of the B9S ceased in Europe in 2011 due to poor profitability, with Volvo offering the existing Volvo B9LA as a successor, which is rear-engined and used the same engine as in final generation of B9S.

== History and evolution ==
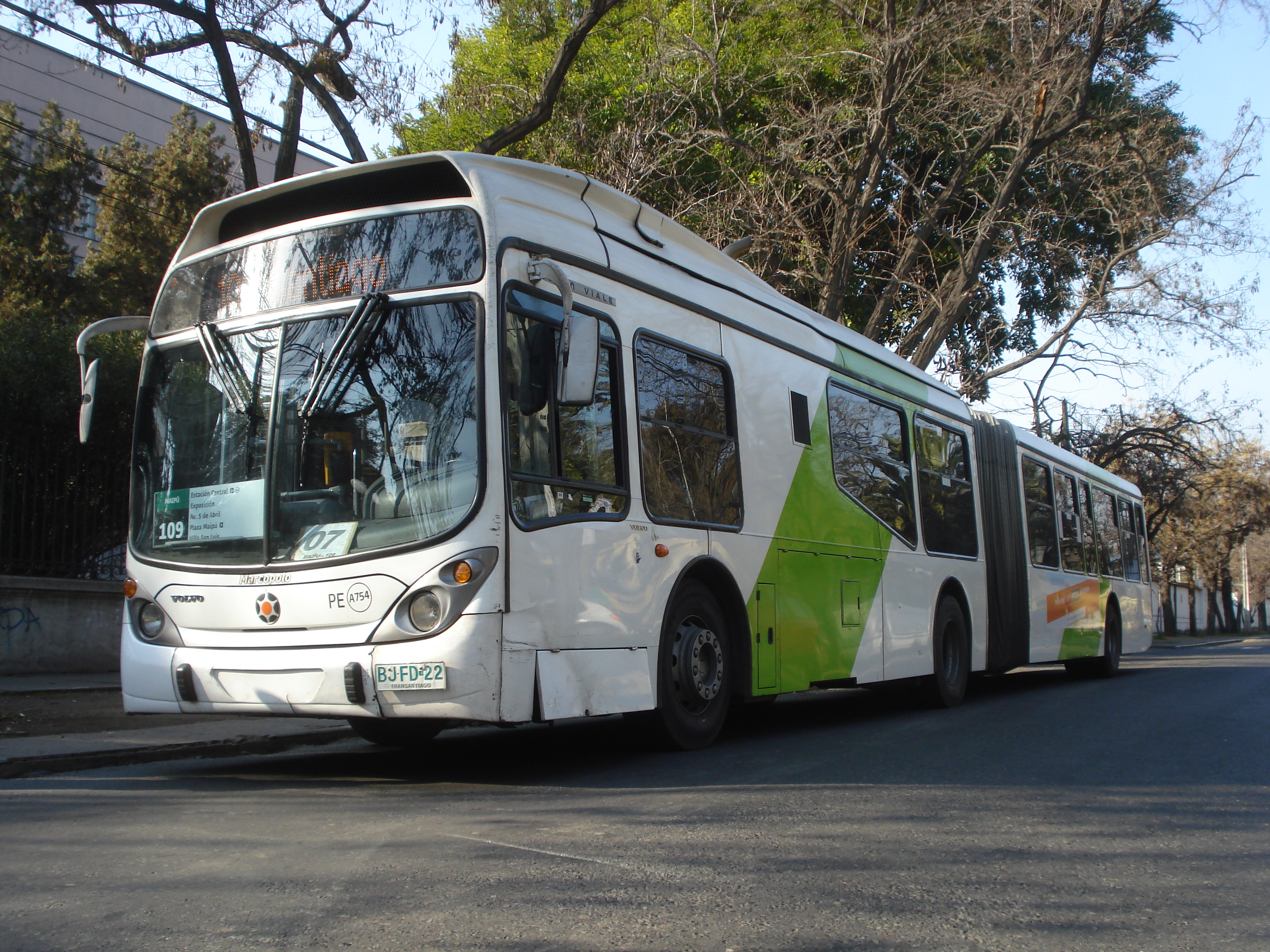
Volvo B9SALF with a Marcopolo Gran Viale bodywork in Santiago, Chile

The B9S was launched in 2002 to replace the Volvo B7L, although production of the latter continued. It was intended to replicate the success of the Volvo B10MA and Volvo B12MA. The new chassis was conceived as a mid-engined articulated bus, with low floor at least in 40% of its length and an engine of less than 10 liters of displacement. Volvo had recently launched a new 9,4 liter engine used in the FM truck series, appearing as alternative against models such as the Van-Hool AG300 and AGG300 that were using 12-liter engines. Placing a vertical engine in the centre of the frontmost section of the articulated bus avoided a wider useless space, freed up rear space, and allowed more even weight distribution. Unlike the prior B10MA/B12MA, the B9S has a step-free entrance and was fully wheelchair-accessible.

Initially made in the Volvo Buses plant in Borås, Sweden, it was offered in two versions:

- The B9SLEA, with low entry
- The B9SALF, with an entirely low floor

They were offered with a frontmost section wheelbase of 6.4 meters and bodied by Säffle, as a complete Volvo 7500 bus. Buses made up to 2005 used the Volvo D9A engine (340 bhp); then switched to the Volvo D9B engine (360 bhp) to confirm to the Euro 4 and Euro 5 emissions rules.

In 2005, the platform's production was extended to Volvo Buses' factory in Curitiba, Brazil, which accommodated an order of 1,159 B9SALF units for the urban system of Santiago, Chile. The order required the modification of the frontmost section to 5 meters to avoid problems of maneuverability in narrow streets. Between 2007 and 2010, about 100 additional units were made there for Chile, and 100 for Brazil.
