= Volvo 7900 =

Integrally-constructed single-decker rigid or articulated bus

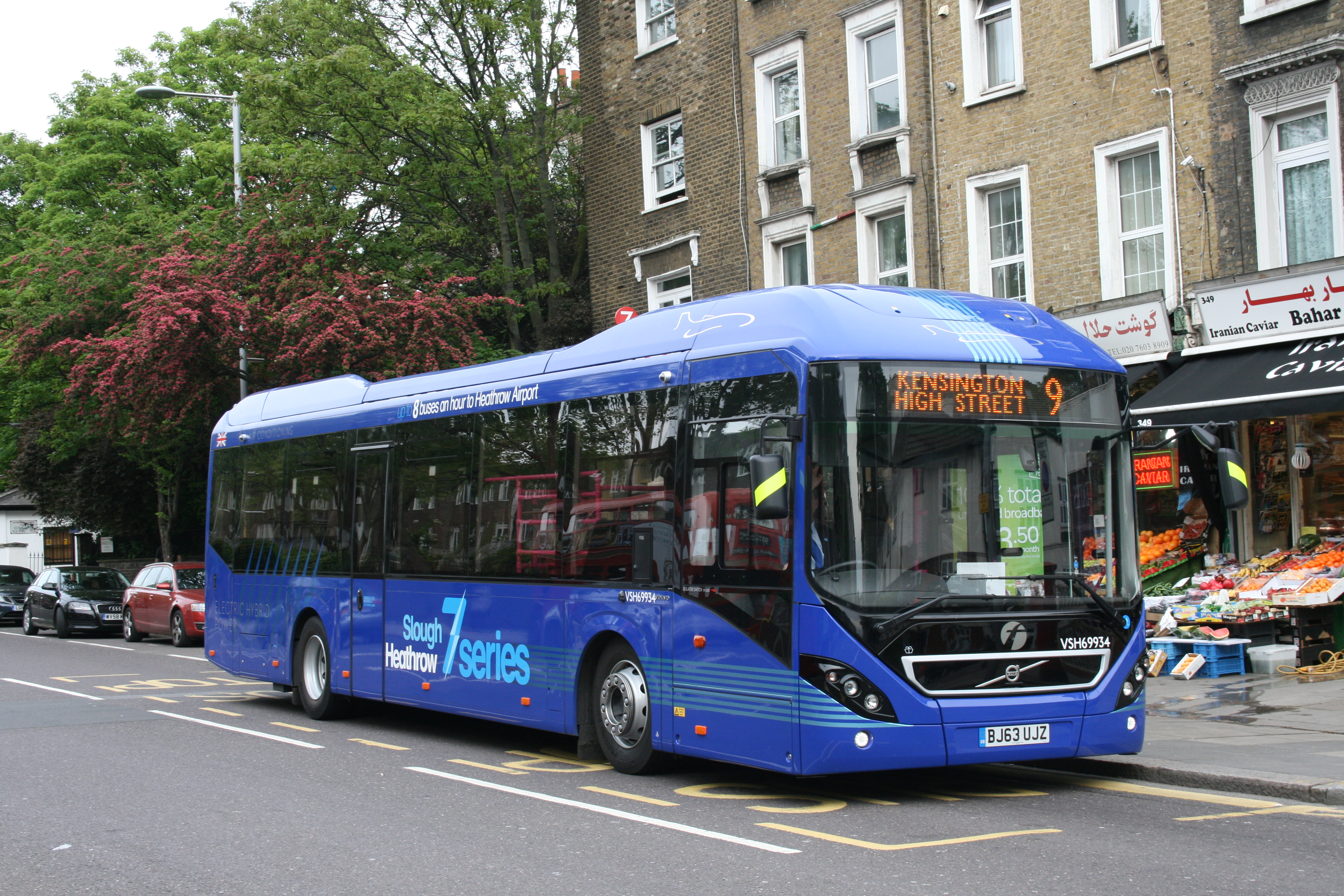
- First Berkshire & The Thames Valley Volvo 7900H bodied B5LH on Kensington High Street in May 2014

Overview
- Manufacturer: Volvo
- Production: 2011–present
- Assembly: Wrocław, Poland

Body and chassis
- Class: Complete bus
- Body style: Single-decker rigid or articulated bus
- Doors: 1, 2, 3 or 4
- Floor type: Low floor
- Chassis: Volvo B5LH, Volvo B9L, Volvo B9LA

Powertrain
- Engine: Volvo D5F, D5K, D9B, G9B
- Capacity: 40 to 68 seated
- Transmission: Volvo I-Shift 12 speed

Dimensions
- Length: 10.6, 12.0, 18.0 metres
- Width: 2.55 metres
- Height: 3.04 metres

Chronology
- Predecessor: Volvo 7700

The Volvo 7900 is an integrally-constructed single-decker rigid or articulated bus. It is most commonly available as a hybrid electric bus named Volvo 7900 Hybrid or just Volvo 7900H; it also available with both diesel and compressed natural gas (CNG) engines in some markets.

== History ==
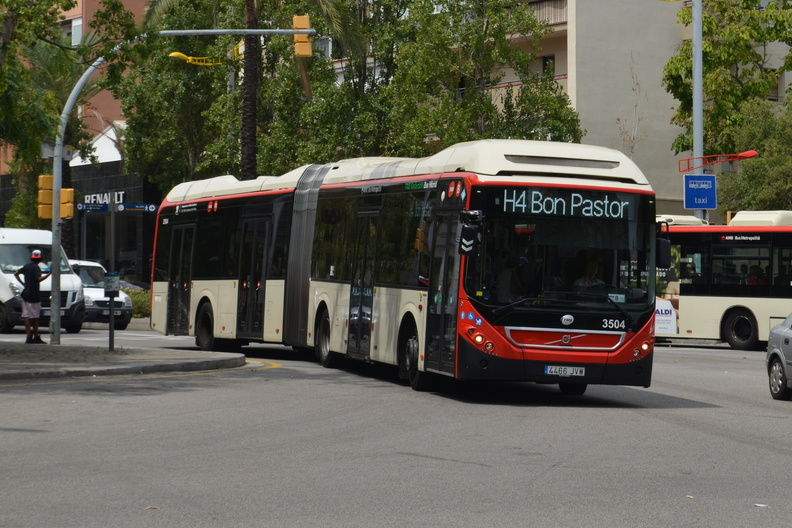
An articulated Volvo 7900 operated by TMB in Barcelona, Spain

It was manufactured at Volvo's plant in Poland until 2023; from then on, the bodywork has been manufactured on licence by MCV Bus and Coach in Egypt. The MCV-assembled 7900 features a slightly updated front, similar to the Volvo 8900 Electric. The Volvo 7900 was introduced at Busworld Kortrijk 2011.

Based on the Volvo 7900 Hybrid, an extension is offered which includes a roof-mounted device for occasional loading at stops. The manufacturer assumes that all buses at all end stations and also at some particularly busy stations stay a few minutes until the return or onward journey. As soon as a bus reaches an appropriately equipped stop, a loading unit attached to a pillar at the roadside lowers onto the coupling point mounted on the roof of the bus. The charging process ends as soon as the bus wants to continue or the battery is full. According to the manufacturer, this equipment allows (in addition to the braking energy recuperation by a regenerative braking system) compared to conventional hybrid buses significantly extending the travel time in electric mode and a reduction in fuel consumption. The vehicle and the charging system were first presented to the public in September 2014 at the International Motor Show.

In 2013, a tri-axle articulated hybrid electric was introduced as the Volvo 7900A Hybrid. It replaced diesel and CNG versions of articulated 7900, due to upcoming discontinuation of B9L chassis without diesel- and CNG-powered non-hybrid replacements in European markets. The same also applied to solo 7900.

In September 2014, an electric plug-in hybrid version was unveiled, marketed as Volvo 7900 Electric Hybrid. Three prototypes were operated in Gothenburg with pre-production examples to be trialled in Hamburg, Luxembourg and Stockholm. Production is set to commence in 2016.

In June 2015, an all-electric version, the Volvo 7900 Electric (sometimes named Volvo 7900e), premiered when three prototype buses entered service in Gothenburg. Series production began in 2017. In September 2017, a Volvo 7900 Electric demonstrator vehicle (LF67 EVV) entered service with First Greater Manchester. The Harrogate Bus Company subsequently placed the first firm order for the 7900 Electric, with eight examples due to enter service in 2018. An articulated version was launched in mainland Europe at Busworld 2019.

Electric versions use modified version of B5LH chassis, designated as Volvo BE, which utilises electric powertrain developed by Volvo. As a separate chassis for third-party bodybuilders, it was first launched in Australia with order announcement for Public Transport Authority in Western Australia in July 2020. These buses will be bodied by Volgren. Volvo BE chassis became known as Volvo BZL in September 2021. Simultaneously, Volvo removed plug-in hybrid bus model (7900 Electric Hybrid) from product offer.

On 14 April 2020, Volvo announced the S-Charge self-charging hybrid versions of 7900 and 7900A, which replaced original hybrid versions of these models. It can run in electric mode at the speeds up to 50 kilometres per hour (31 mph), up from 20 kilometres per hour (12 mph) in the previous hybrid model. Previous model continued to be available in certain markets, such as the UK and Germany (was replaced in latter). Upgrades of hybrid models were first announced in October 2019. Upgrades were also made for B5LH chassis.

The model is marketed in Germany as Volvo 7900 H/HA for hybrid versions, Volvo 7900 EH for plug-in hybrid version and Volvo 7900 E for electric versions. Additionally, in selected countries, the names Hybrid, Electric Hybrid and Electric are translated to its official languages.

== Operators by country ==
=== Belgium ===
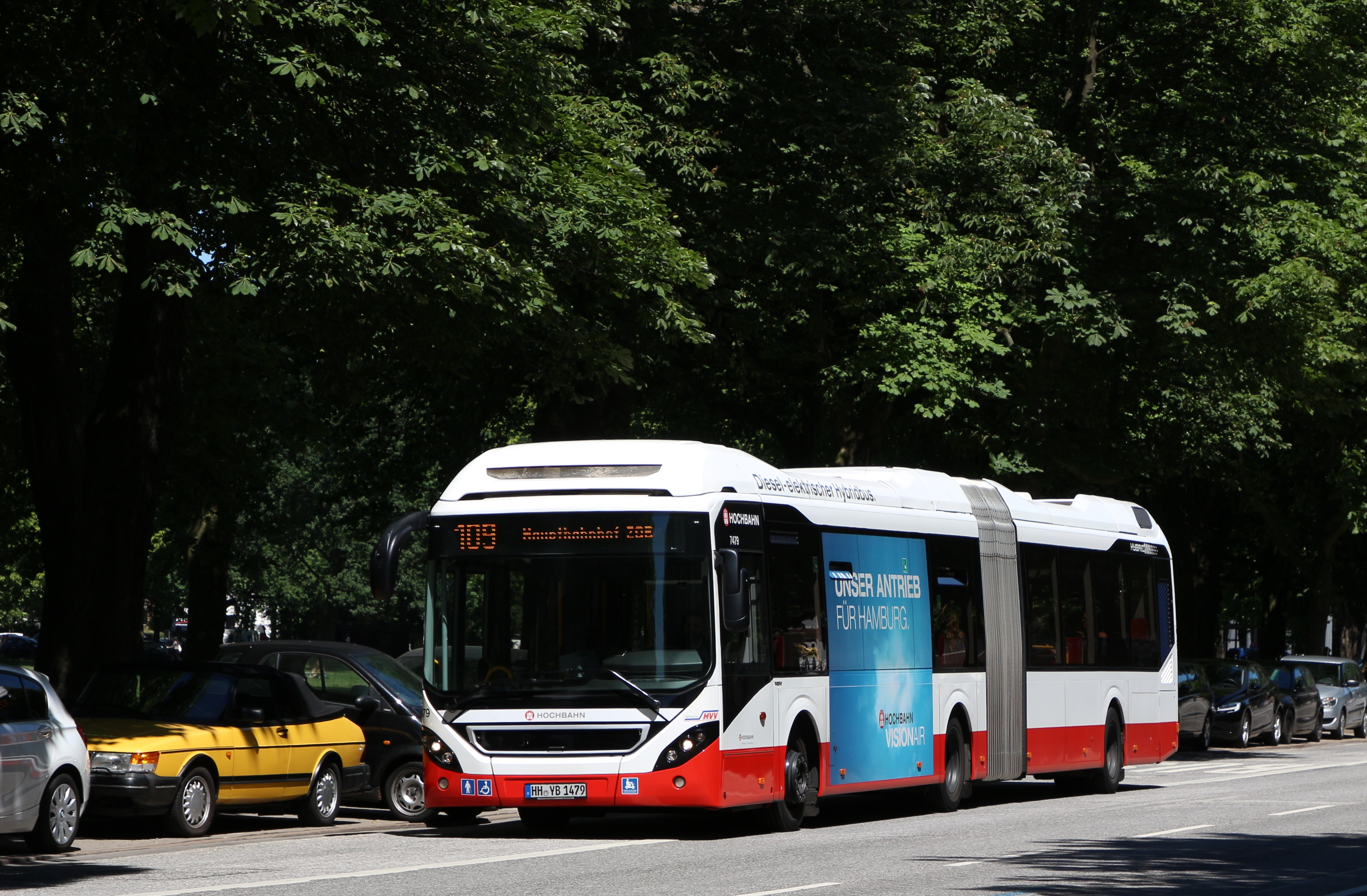
An articulated Volvo 7900 Hybrid, operated by Hamburger Hochbahn

In Brussels, STIB operate, as part of a test, from 31 July 2017 to mid-September 2017 one 7900 Hybrid on route 64. Since 30 October 2017, the STIB operate one 7900 A Hybrid on route 66. 110 Volvo 7900 Hybrid were delivered between 2018 and 2019 and numbered 9401–9505. In May 2020 the STIB ordered another batch of 128 Volvo 7900 Hybrid, these buses will replace the oldest VanHool NewA330 from 2007 (fleet number 8101 to 8227).

In Namur, SRWT operate 11 Volvo 7900 Electric Hybrid since early 2017. The fleet number of the buses in Namur is 4960 to 4970.

In Charleroi SRWT operate 55 Volvo 7900 Electric Hybrid since 11 December 2017. The fleet number of the buses is 7901 to 7955.

In December 2014, the transport company Hamburger Hochbahn put the first buses of this type into operation on the Innovation Line 109.

=== Estonia ===
Tallinna Linnatranspordi AS (Tallinn City Transport Inc.) of Tallinn operate a fleet of 44 7900 Hybrid since December 2015.

=== Hungary ===
Volánbusz of Budapest operated 89 articulated 7900s.

=== Lithuania ===
Vilniaus viešasis transportas operated two buses in Vilnius in June 2017 and September 2019, as part of a trial to test buses by different manufacturers.

=== Norway ===
Boreal Transport have operated one hybrid bus in Stavanger since 2012. In July 2013, Nettbuss took delivery of six diesels for Kongsberg and, in October 2013, 17 hybrid buses for Oslo. In July 2014, Nettbuss received 27 further hybrids for use in Drammen. In summer 2019, Tide Buss took delivery of 21 electric models for use in the Trondheim area.

=== Sweden ===
There are a number of hybrids and articulated hybrids. In 2020 operators like Transdev, Nobina and Vy ordered large numbers of 7900 Electric, both rigid and articulated. For example 145 for Transdev in Gothenburg, 60 for Nobina in Malmö and 49 for Jönköping. These entered service in 2021.

=== United Kingdom ===
Both hybrid version and electric options are available: The Harrogate Bus Company operates eight, Lothian Buses operate a fleet of 50 and Stagecoach West Scotland have a fleet of six which entered service in 2021.

First Essex took delivery of 19 7900s in April 2013 to operate the 100 route from the Basildon depot. The buses were slated to be refurbished to coincide with the Basildon Shuttles rebranding with one of the nineteen being refurbished. However, due to a fire caused by another 7900 in the fleet, the buses were withdrawn on 19 August 2023.
