= Volvo B9L =

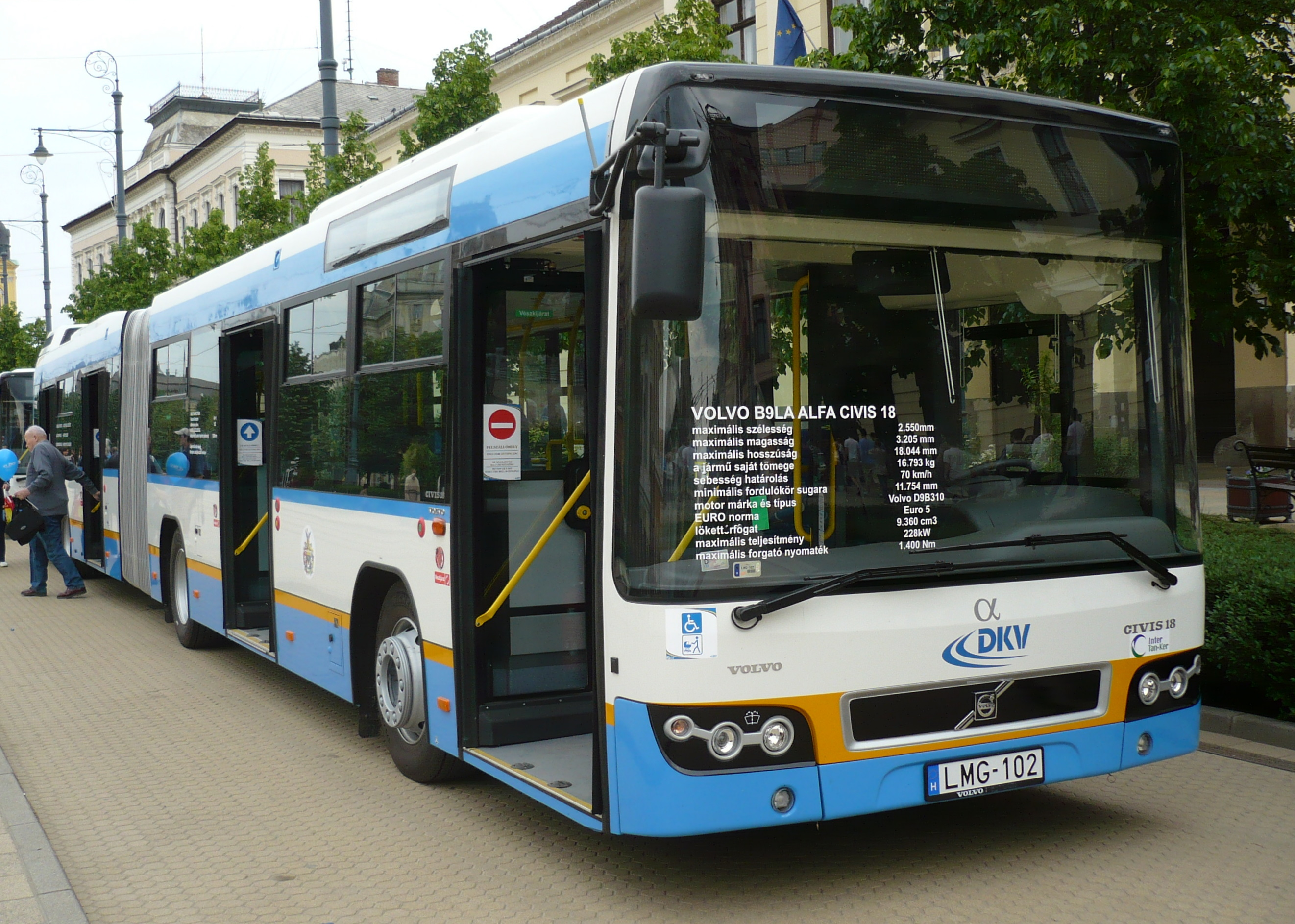

Overview
- Manufacturer: Volvo Buses
- Production: 2005–2013

Body and chassis
- Class: Bus chassis
- Body style: Single-decker public bus Single-decker articulated bus
- Related: Volvo B9LA

Powertrain
- Engine: 9-liter 6-cylinder vertical rear-mounted in-line engine Volvo D9B; Weichai Power WP7.270E50; Shanghai Diesel Engine SC9DF260Q5
- Power output: 260hp, 310hp, 360hp

Dimensions
- Length: 12.0m to 18.0m
- Width: 2.5m
- Height: 3.0m

Chronology
- Predecessor: Volvo B7L; Volvo B10L; Volvo B9S
- Successor: Volvo B5LH; Volvo B8RLE

The Volvo B9L (also known as the Volvo 7500, Volvo 7700 or Volvo 7900 for integral models) is a fully low-floor single-decker bus chassis constructed by Volvo Buses from 2005 until 2013, replacing the Volvo B7L and Volvo B10L. An articulated model, known as the Volvo B9LA, is also available. It was superseded by the Volvo B5LH and Volvo B8RLE in Europe.

The engine is mounted vertically on the rear left overhang of the chassis similarly to with the B7L, allowing B9Ls to be low-floor throughout the whole length of the bus due to a lack of underfloor equipment. The Volvo B9L is available as an integral bus bodied by Volvo (7500/7700/7900) or as a chassis only, with bodies by other manufacturers.

Additionally, the B9L reintroduced CNG engines, an option unavailable in its predecessor, the B7L. These versions replaced much older predecessor, the B10L. It was the last low-floor bus chassis from Volvo to be available with such option.

Large orders for B9Ls were placed in Malmö, where they form the majority of the fleet, as well as in Stockholm, Kristianstad, and Örebro. Despite this overall sales of the B9L were poor, especially outside of Sweden, with many operators instead preferring the existing B7RLE or new B9S.

In Singapore, ComfortDelGro Bus had also purchased a fleet of SC Auto bodied Volvo B9L buses in 2015 for its National University of Singapore internal shuttle service. These Volvo B9L buses are Euro V compliant engine resemblance to those are saving engine and 6-speed automatic gearbox used on Volvo B9TL (Wright Eclipse Gemini 2) buses.

In Mainland China, Volvo B9L chassis is bodied with Volvo 7900 three-door bodywork manufactured by Shanghai SUNWIN Bus Corporation, a joint venture of SAIC Group and Volvo AB, assembly named SWB6128V8LF. The D9B engine is replaced by Weichai WP7.270E50 or Shanghai Diesel Engine SC9DF260Q5 designed and manufactured domestically.

In Greece, specifically in Thessaloniki, the local operator OASTH introduced 44 B9LAs in 2007 (851-894) and in 2010 20 B9Ls (111-130) together with 20 B9LAs (901-920) were introduced, all constructed by ELVO. Eventually in 2019-2023 the 44 B9LAs from 2007 were mostly withdrawn due to serious chassis defects (Except for the bus 869 NHZ-6749) but recently (in 2024) busses 901 to 920 were repaired and are on roads again.
