= Volvo 7700 =

Low-floor citybus from Volvo

Volvo 7000/7700
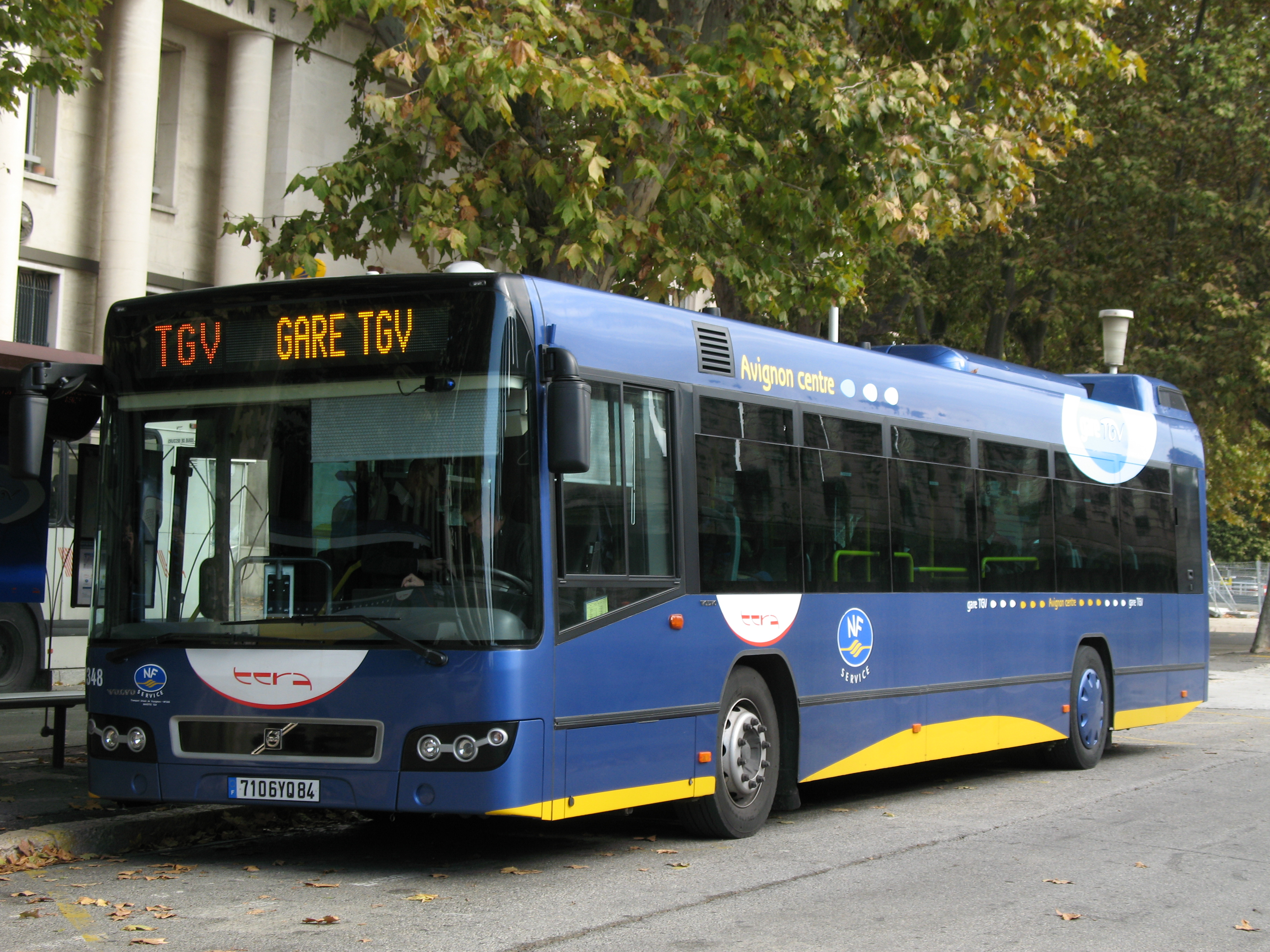

Overview
- Manufacturer: Volvo
- Production: 1999–2012
- Assembly: Vantaa, Finland (1999–2001); Wrocław, Poland (1999–2012)

Body and chassis
- Class: Complete bus
- Body style: Single-decker rigid bus Single-decker articulated bus
- Doors: 1, 2, 3 or 4
- Floor type: Low floor
- Chassis: Volvo B5LH, B7L/B7LA, B9L/B9LA, B10L/B10LA

Powertrain
- Capacity: 40 to 69 seated

Dimensions
- Length: 11.0 metres, 12.0 metres, 12.9 metres and 18.0 metres
- Width: 2.55 metres
- Height: 3.05 metres

Chronology
- Predecessor: Carrus City U
- Successor: Volvo 7900

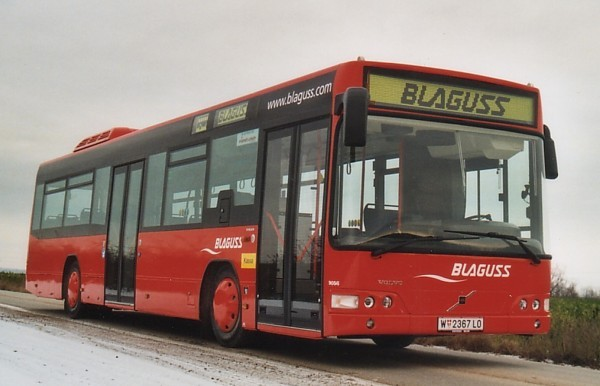
A Volvo 7000 from Blaguss in Wien.

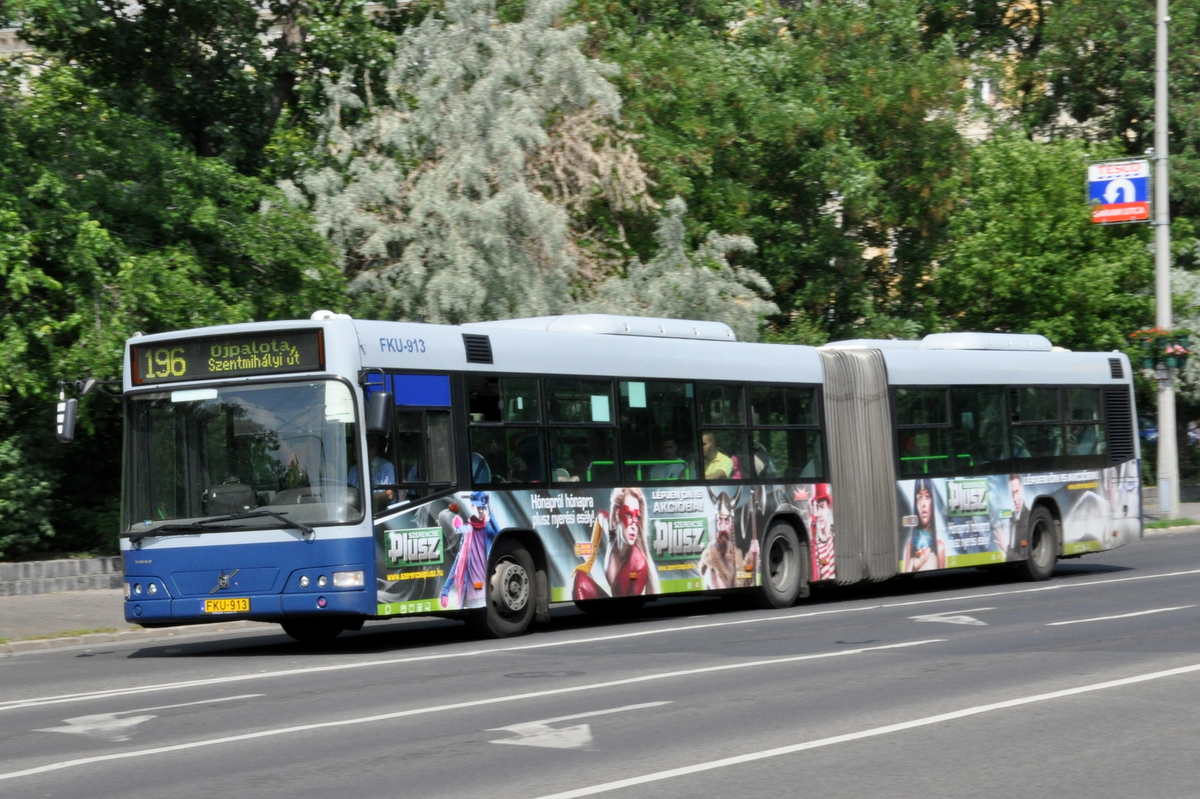
One of many Volvo 7700A on B7LA delivered to BKV in Budapest in 2004–2006.

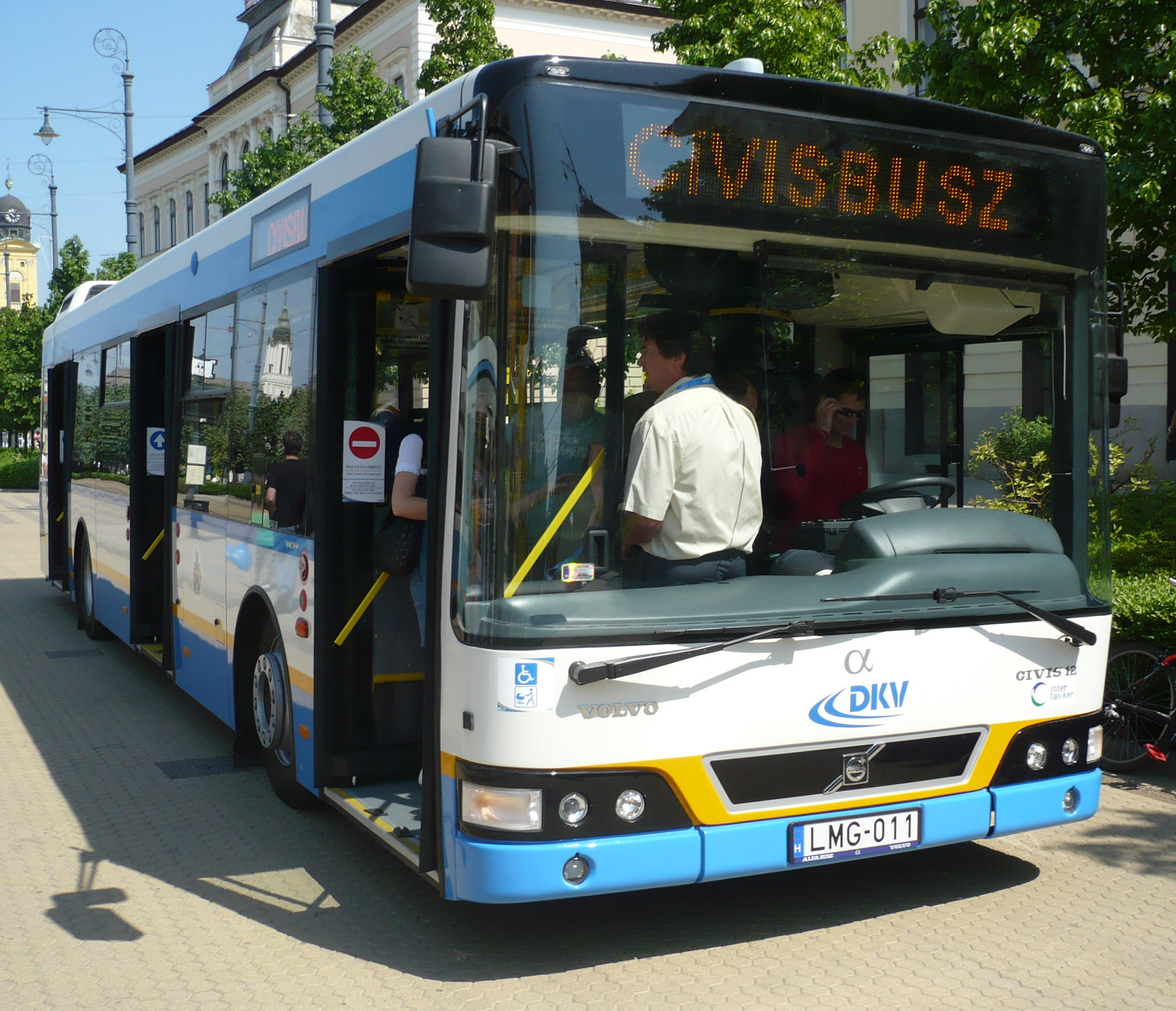
An Alfa Cívis 12 of DKV, looking very similar to the 7700.

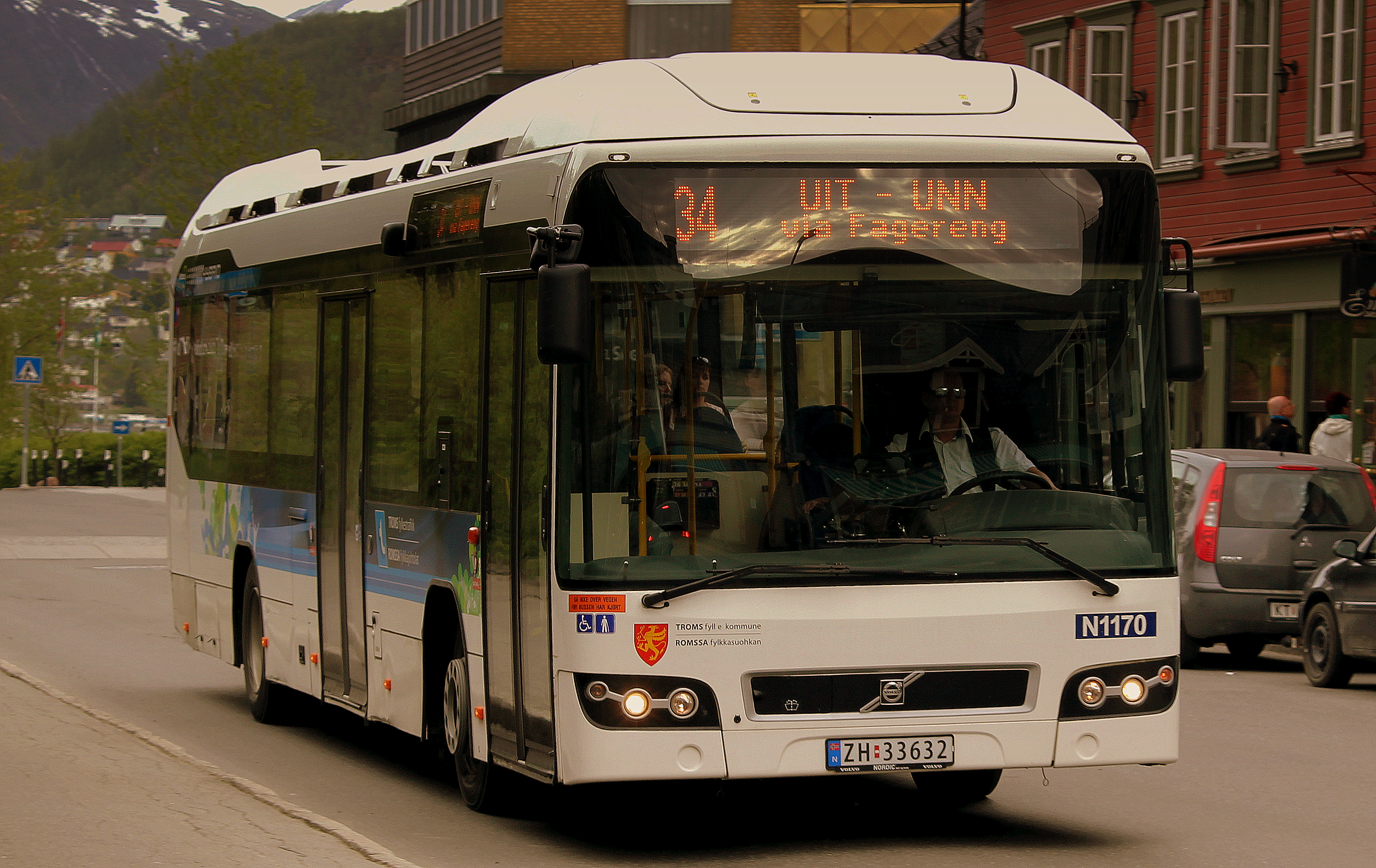
A Volvo 7700 Hybrid in Tromsø operated by Nobina Norge. One of a batch of 32 hybrids from 2012 operating at 69°N.

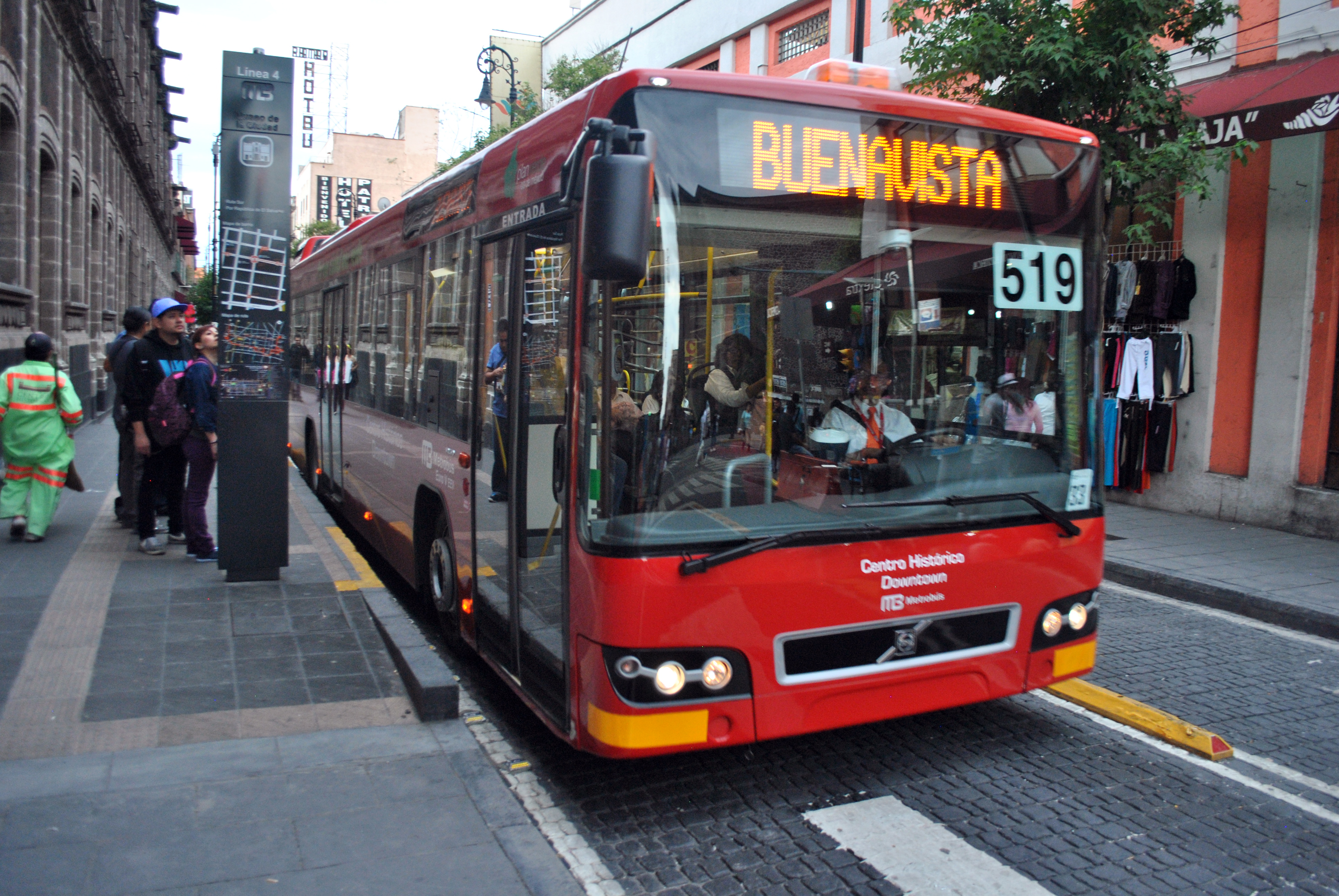
Volvo 7700 on B9L at the city museum station on Mexico City Metrobús line 4.

The Volvo 7000, later Volvo 7700, was an integrally-constructed fully low-floor single-decker rigid bus and single-decker articulated bus built by Volvo between 1999 and 2012. It was generally available as 12-metre and 18-metre on both diesel and CNG, and from 2010 as a 12-metre hybrid electric. A trolleybus version has also been built.

== History ==
The model was developed in Finland under the name Carrus K206, but when presented in late 1998 together with the Säffle-built Volvo 5000 it became known as the Volvo 7000. In addition to the 12.0 metre being built on B7L, it was also available as the 18.0 metre articulated Volvo 7000A built on B7LA. CNG versions were built on B10L/B10LA. Standard 12- and 18-metre versions were manufactured at the plant in Wrocław, Poland. In Vantaa, Finland (Carrus Oy Wiima) the 12-metre version was built, in addition to some customized lengths. Turku received some short 11-metre ones, while Helsinki received some longer ones at 12.89 metres. Production in Vantaa ceased when the plant was closed down in 2001. By this time only 43 7000s had been delivered to customers in Finland, in addition to a handful of demonstrators for various countries.

During 2003 the model was renamed to Volvo 7700 and Volvo 7700A, to better fit with the other model names introduced since 2001, like the 8700 and the 9700. No other changes than the name is known to have been done to the model that year.

In 2006 it was upgraded with the B9L and B9LA chassis, and at the same time got a facelift. The front was changed with a "grille" and new headlights, and the rear end got a "lump" at the top and new taillights. The rest of the exterior was more or less unchanged.

In 2008 the first prototypes for a hybrid electric bus named Volvo 7700 Hybrid were built on the B5LH chassis. Serial production started in 2010.

Volvo's Hungarian subsidiary Alfa Busz Kft in Székesfehérvár manufactured a batch of 102 Alfa Cívis 12 in 2009, which were made to look similar to the 7700. There were two prototypes and then 100 buses for public operator DKV in Debrecen. In addition a batch of 40 Volvo 7700A were delivered to DKV the same year, being specially adapted, they were rebranded as Alfa Cívis 18.

The Volvo 7700's successor, the Volvo 7900, was introduced in 2011, and the last 7700s were built in 2012.

== Operators ==
=== Continental Europe ===
Austria

In 1999, a batch of seven (#221-227) 7000A were delivered to Linz Linien. In 2000 they received a further two (#185-186) 7700 and in 2000-2001 19 (#201-219) 7000A that were built as trolleybuses, known as the Volvo 7000AT. In 2001–2002, Blaguss in Wien received 12 (#9051-9062) standard 7000s.

Germany

Several cities received small batches of buses, while Berliner Verkehrsbetriebe received a total of 51 (#1355-1405) 7700s in 2002. Alpina Rhein-Main in Frankfurt received a batch of 36 (#901-936) B9L 7700s in 2006. In 2008, Autobus Sippel in Hofheim received 28 (#201-228) 7700s and 20 (#229-248) 7700As.

Hungary

In 2003, Volvo signed a contract to deliver 150 7700As to BKV in Budapest, being the first ever non-Hungarian manufacturer to deliver such an order to Budapest. All 150 buses were delivered between 2004 and 2006. BKV have later bought both 7700 and 7700A second hand, and operated a few leased Alfa Cívis 12s. More 7700As have been delivered to other Hungarian operators from 2007.

Lithuania

Between 2004 and 2006, Vilniaus autobusai received 60 7700s and 30 7700As. This was Volvos first order for new citybuses in Lithuania. 2006 made Volvo 7700s are also used in Kaunas.

Netherlands

BBA in North Brabant, later Veolia Transport Nederland, received in 2004 a batch of 35 (#250-256, #3801-3828) 7700s, and a further 114 (#3829-3942) 7700s and 48 (#5811-5858) 7700As of the new B9L/B9LA type in 2006–2007.

Poland

As the model was being produced in Poland, several cities in Poland received batches of 7000s and 7000As, with city of manufacturing, Wrocław, receiving 100 (#8046-8145) 7000A/7700A and 37 (#7000-7036) 7000/7700 between 2001 and 2006.

Switzerland

Between 2000 and 2002, TPG in Geneva received a total of 84 (#301-384) 7000A, with additional 6 (#385-390) 7700A in 2004. Bernmobil in Bern received a batch of 32 (#801-832) 7700A on B9LA CNG in 2006–2007, followed by 15 (#121-132, #141-143) 7700 on B9L CNG in 2007–2009.

Czech Republic

In the Czech republic, the 7700 was operated primarily in Kroměříž, with two 7000's delivered in 2003 and five 7700's delivered between 2004 and 2007. They officially remained in regular service until the 1st of August 2026. That day, as a farewell, only the still functional 7700's were deployed on all lines, contrary to just rush hours or as a backup, as was common since earlier that year. Since then they only serve as a backup. Both 7000's were scrapped and the two oldest 7700's were put out of service throughout 2020s.

One ex-demo 7700A was also operated in the Central Bohemian Region by ČSAD POLKOST.

=== Nordic countries ===
Despite its Nordic origin, the 7000/7700 was never really popular in the Nordic countries, except for a few Wiima-built ones that were delivered to Helsinki and Turku when the model was fairly new. This is mostly because full low-floor buses have not been much popular there compared to the low-entry ones. It was first when the hybrid arrived that the 7700 became a popular model in the region.

Norway

In early 2001, one Vantaa-built 7000 came to Norway as a demonstrator, and was the only 7000/7700 in the country until the B9L-facelift in 2006. It was never really sold to any customer, and was only rented out for shorter periods to different operators. BorgBuss received as first Norwegian customer two (#96166-96167) B9L CNG 7700s for Fredrikstad in 2006, with two more (#96177-96178) in 2009. Sporveisbussene (now Unibuss) in Oslo received in 2007 a batch of 11 (#513-523) 7700s. Veolia Transport (now Boreal Transport) in Stavanger received the same year a batch of 15 (#1057-1071) 7700As, followed by 35 (#1139-1173) CNG 7700s in 2008. Then in 2010 a massive amount of 7700s and 7700As reached the country. Tide Buss received 63 (#8264-8273, #8286-8338) 7700s and 12 (#8274-8285) 7700As for Bergen, and 16 (#5130-5145) CNG 7700s for Haugesund. Nettbuss received 22 (#48320-48339, #48392-48393) 7700s for Grenland, 10 (#47489-47498) 7700 Hybrids for Trondheim (Team Trafikk) and two (#10008-10009) 7700 Hybrids for Arendal. Unibuss received two (#608-609) 7700 Hybrids and five (#1018-1022) 7700As for Oslo. In 2011, Nettbuss received one (#17085) 7700 Hybrid for Sarpsborg, while Unibuss received one (#1210) 7700 Hybrid and 22 (#1250-1271) CNG 7700s for Oslo. Early in 2012, Nobina Norge received 32 (#1152-1183) 7700 Hybrids for Tromsø, and Nettbuss received 13 (#22301-22313) 7700 Hybrids for Hamar in the summer. Also in January 2012, two of the 2008 prototypes went into a one-year test run for Boreal Transport in Finnmark, with at least one of them serving as citybus in Alta. The last of this model to be delivered to a customer in Norway was a custom made 18.75-metre 7700A that had been built in 2011/2012 in a bid for a tender in Oslo where the buses by requirement had to be at least 18.74 metres long. Volvo did not win the bid, and if they had, the serial production would most likely have been built as 7900A. In late 2013 this bus entered service for Avinor as an airside bus at Trondheim Airport, Værnes.

=== North America ===
Mexico

In 2012, Mexico City Metrobús line 4 was inaugurated with 54 12-metre Volvo 7700 buses. Most of these were of the standard B9L type, but there were also a few 7700 Hybrids. It is not known if these buses were shipped from Poland or if they were assembled on the continent.
