= Volvo B5LH =

Low-floor hybrid-electric bus chassis

Volvo B5LH (B5L Hybrid/BRLH) Volvo B5LHC Volvo B5L S-Charge
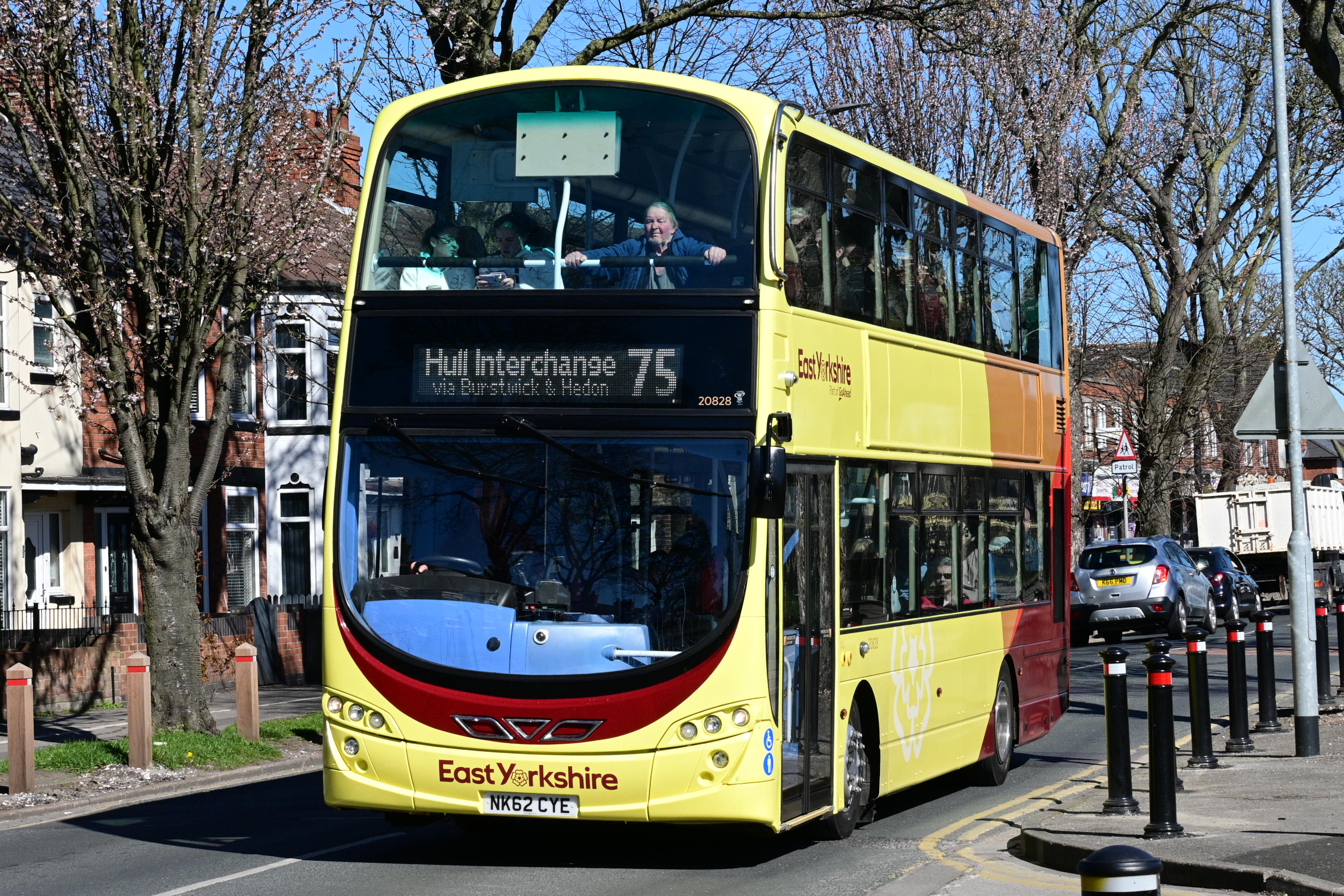
- East Yorkshire Wright Eclipse Gemini 2-bodied Volvo B5LH double decker in April 2025

Overview
- Manufacturer: Volvo
- Production: 2008-2009 (pre-production batches with D5E engine, B5LH); 2010-present (serial production, B5LH); 2016-2018 (B5LHC); 2020-present (B5L S-Charge)

Body and chassis
- Doors: Single door or Dual door
- Floor type: Low floor

Powertrain
- Engine: Euro V: Volvo D5F-215 and I-SAM; Euro VI: D5K-240 and I-SAM
- Capacity: up to 90 Passengers
- Transmission: Volvo I-Shift 12-speed auto

Dimensions
- Length: 10.5 m (34 ft 5 in) or 11.5 m (37 ft 9 in) (Early version: 10.4 m (34 ft 1 in)) (Double-decker); 18.0 m (59 ft 1 in) (Articulated)
- Width: 2.55 m (8 ft 4 in)
- Height: varies, depending on bus body type

The Volvo B5LH (initially known as the Volvo B5L Hybrid, also known as the Volvo BRLH) is a low-floor hybrid electric bus chassis for both single-decker buses and double-decker buses manufactured by Volvo since 2008. It is the basis for Volvo's integral 7700 Hybrid full low floor city bus and its successor, the 7900 Hybrid from 2011. In 2008, pre-production batches of both types of chassis were manufactured. Serial production started in June 2010. From 2013 it is also available as an articulated bus chassis.

An updated version, the Volvo B5LHC, was launched in 2016, designed for high-capacity inner-city work. The chassis was available with Wright SRM bodywork. The B5LHC was discontinued in 2018 after only two examples built, with Volvo instead focusing on developing the Volvo BZL battery electric bus chassis.

On 14 April 2020, Volvo announced the S-Charge self-charging hybrid version of B5L chassis, which replaced the original hybrid model. It is known as Volvo B5L S-Charge and can run in electric mode at the speeds up to 50 km/h, up from 20 km/h in previous model. The previous B5LH continues to be available in certain markets.

== Design and performance ==
The B5LH is powered by Volvo's in-house parallel hybrid drive train that couple its I-SAM motor to a 5-litre D5-series diesel engine. The drive train is connected to the Volvo I-Shift automatic transmission that drives the rear axle. The whole drive train is mounted in-line at the left rear of the chassis, similar to the B7L. A lithium battery pack is mounted just behind the front left wheel, powering the I-SAM motor system.

The B5LH features stop-start system that allows its engine to cut off when the bus is stationary and the battery is sufficiently charged. It is also capable to drive at full-electric mode from standstill to up to 20 km/h (12 mph). In service, Volvo claims that the B5LH achieves 35% improvement on fuel consumption and reduces the emission of greenhouse gases, including carbon dioxide by an equivalent amount. In-service data in London shows that the B5LH is demonstrating between 25 and 40% of fuel consumption improvement.

== Operators ==
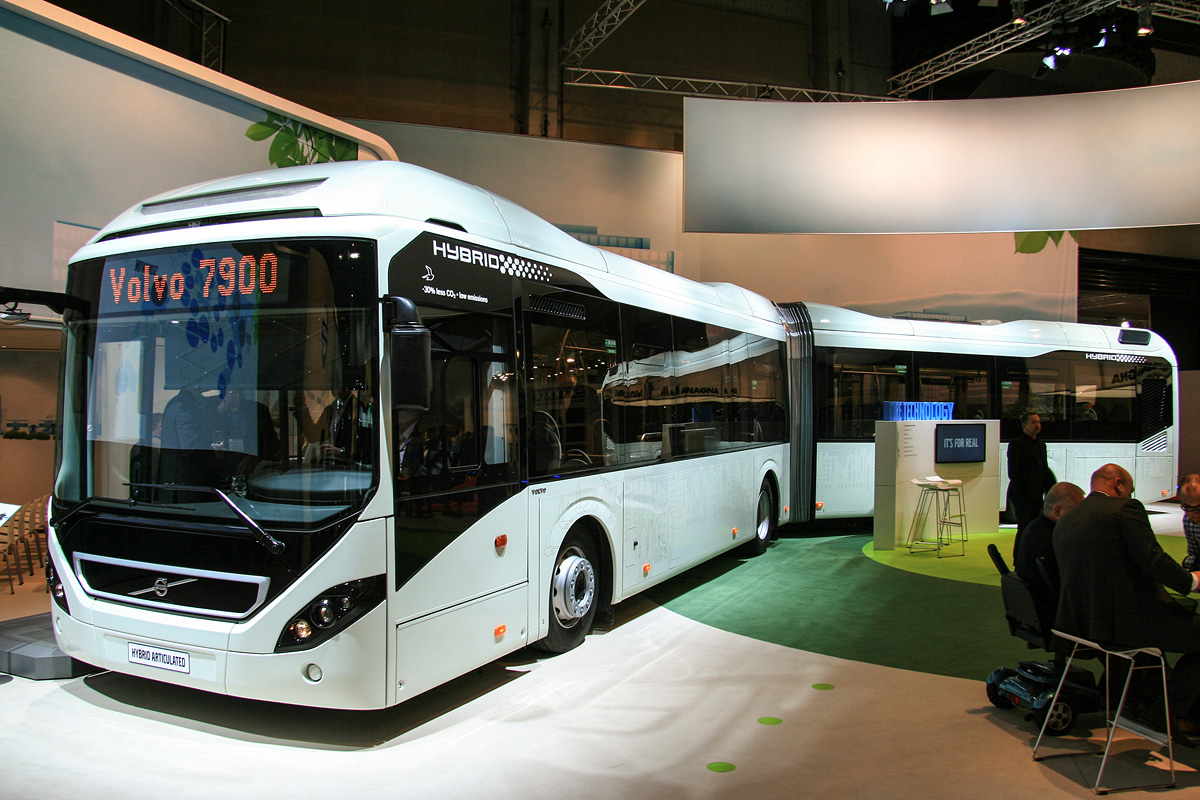
Volvo 7900A Hybrid-bodied B5LAH at Busworld Kortrijk 2013.

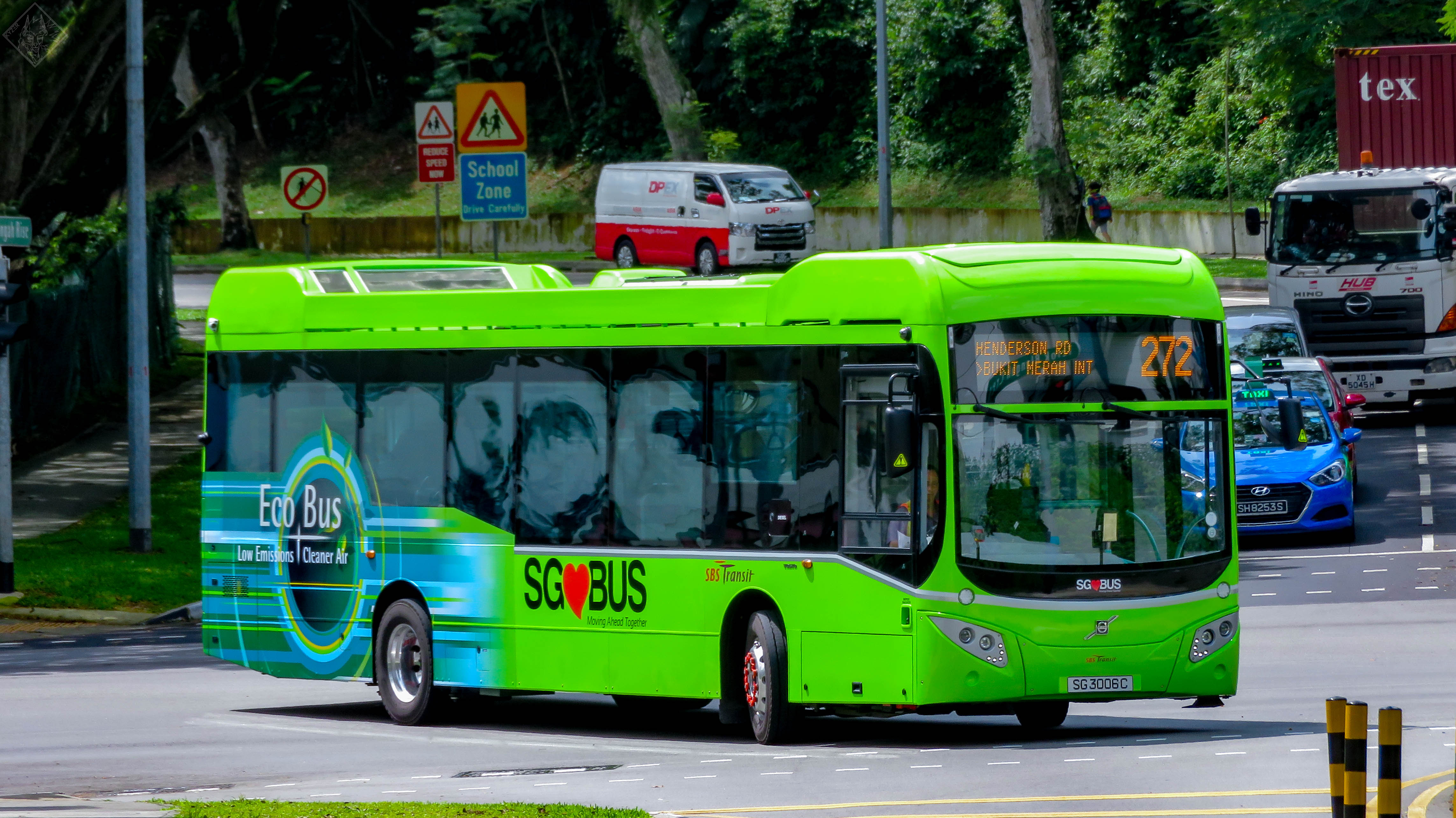
An MCV Evora-bodied Volvo B5LH in Singapore

=== Australia ===
In 2017, Latrobe Valley Bus Lines, Australia, purchased 8, bodied with local Volgren bodywork. Also in the same state of Victoria, 50 Volvo B5LHs were delivered to CDC Melbourne between 2019 and 2022, and the fleet was once the largest hybrid bus fleet in Australia.

=== Ireland ===
A Wright Gemini 3 bodied Volvo B5LH demonstrator was delivered to Dublin Bus in early 2014 for evaluation; Dublin planned to lease 3 of the vehicles, but were unable to fund the lease.

=== Norway ===
At least four Volvo 7700 Hybrid prototypes were built in late 2008 for initial testing before some of them from 2009 toured many countries as demonstrators, only having short periods of proper duty at various places. In early 2012 two of them ended up in the city of Alta in Finnmark, Norway for year-long testing in the arctic climate with local operator Boreal Transport.

=== Singapore ===
The Land Transport Authority purchased fifty MCV Evora bodied Volvo B5L Hybrid buses for S$30 million. They entered service from December 2018 with SBS Transit and SMRT Buses initially. In 2021, Tower Transit took over several units of the B5LH from SMRT as part of the handover of the Sembawang-Yishun Bus Package under the Bus Contracting Model (BCM). All Sembawang-Yishun Package's bus routes have utilised B5LHs under Tower Transit. these Hybrid-electric buses were powered by the Volvo D5K-240 (Euro 6) engine (5,132cc) with power output of 177 kW, Volvo integrated starter alternator motor I-SAM with lithium ion batteries and fitted with 12-speed automatic Volvo AT2412E I-Shift transmission. an electric air-conditioning unit system are located at the roof of the bus supplied by Valeo (model: REVO). Selective catalytic reduction (with Exhaust gas recirculation), hence requiring the exhaust fluids use of AdBlue. the Volvo B5L Hybrid chassis was unveiled at Ulu Pandan Bus Depot in October 2018.

=== United Kingdom ===
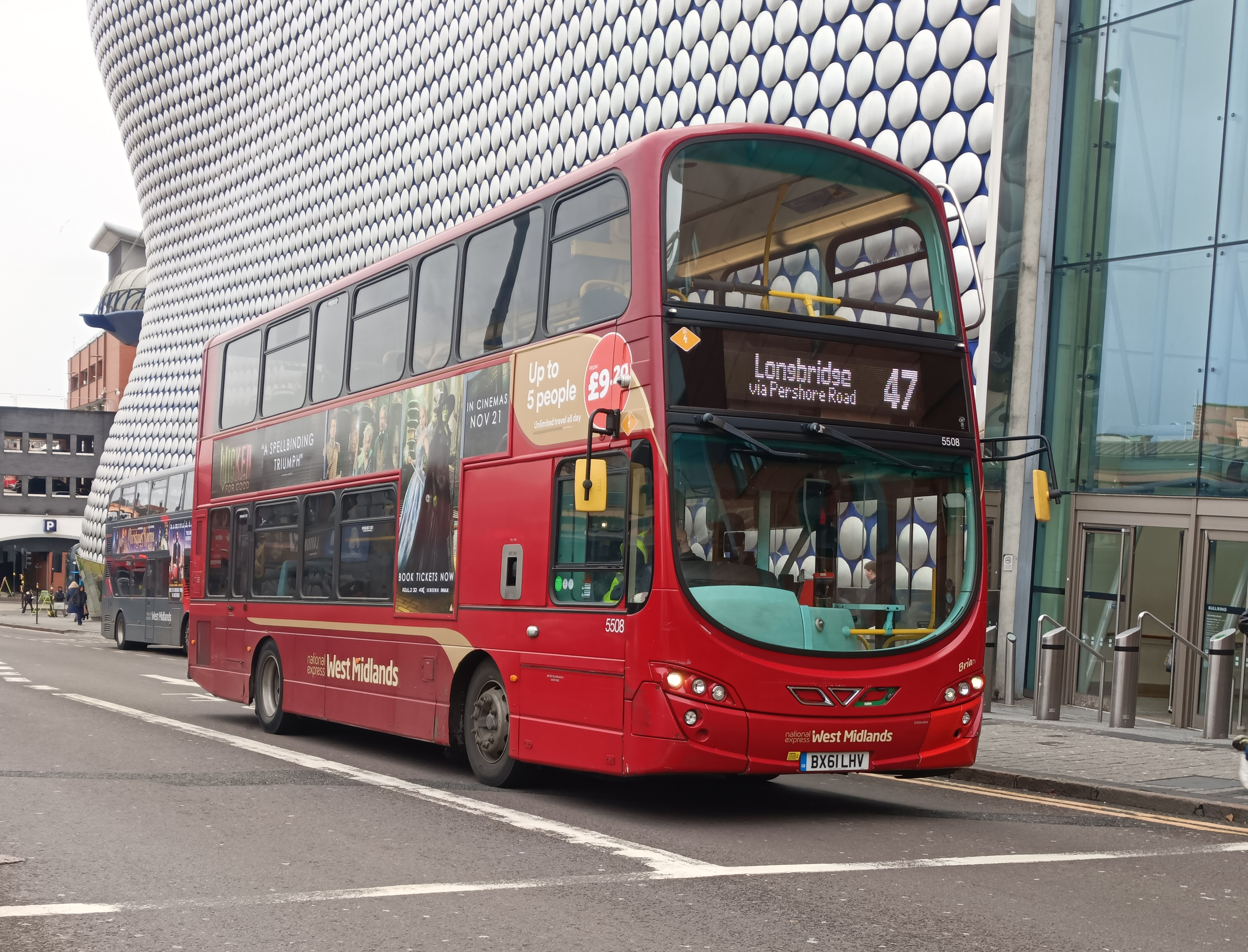
National Express West Midlands Wright Eclipse Gemini 2 bodied B5LH at Birmingham in November 2025

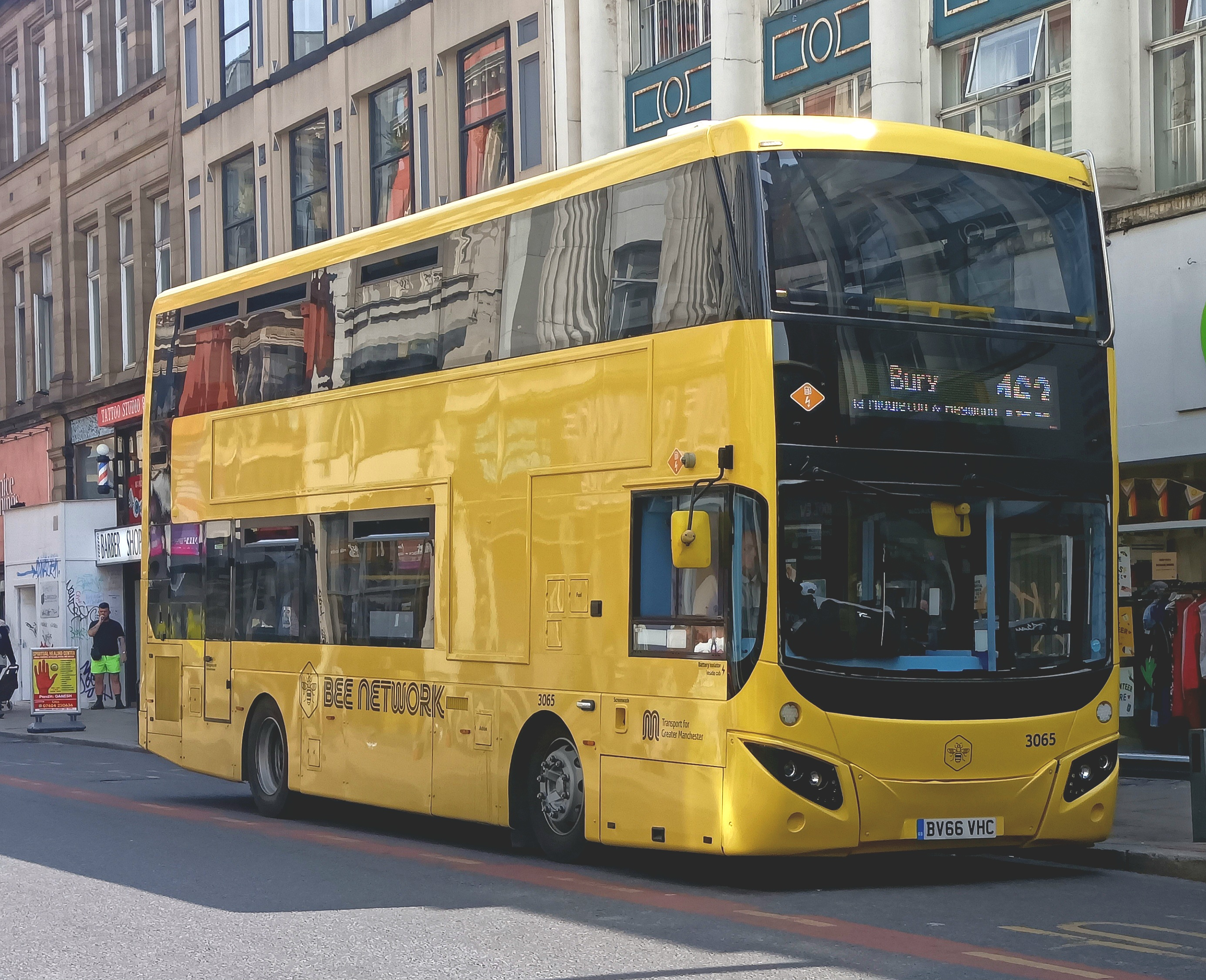
Go North West MCV EvoSeti bodied B5LH at Piccadilly Gardens in June 2025

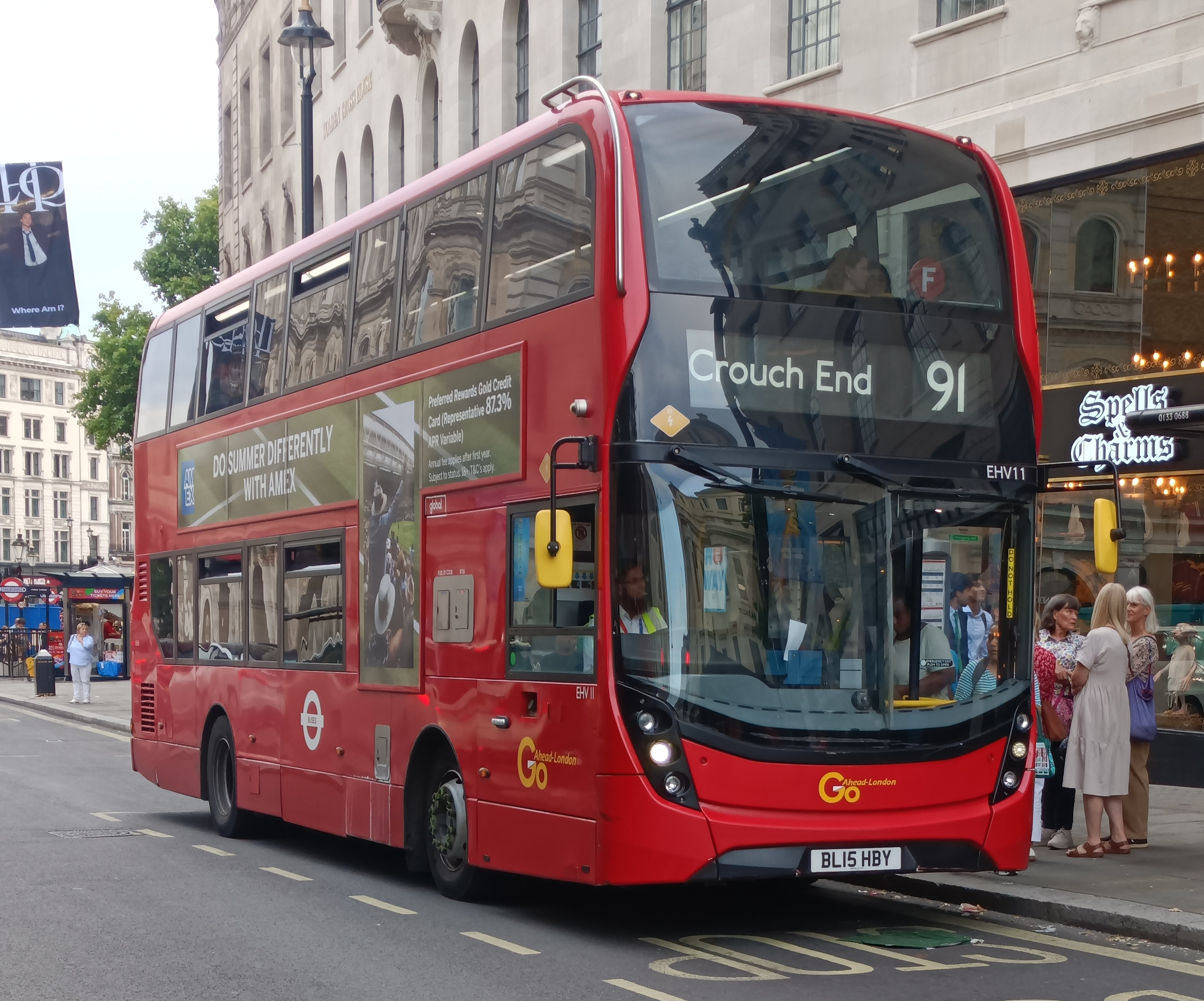
London General Alexander Dennis Enviro400 MMC bodied B5LH at Charing Cross in July 2025

Prior to the introduction of battery electric buses to many of these operators, the hybrid B5LH gained popularity with bus operators across the UK. The first batch of six pre-production B5LH double-deckers entered service with Arriva London in 2009, with production examples later entering service with TfL bus operators Go-Ahead London, London Sovereign, Metroline and Stagecoach London. Outside the capital, the B5LH has been purchased by BakerBus, Brighton & Hove, Bullocks Coaches, Ensignbus, First Essex, First Greater Manchester, First Leeds, Go North East, National Express West Midlands, Oxford Bus Company and Preston Bus. In many cases, a number of operators took deliveries of B5LHs alongside its main rival, the serial hybrid drive Alexander Dennis Enviro400H.

The B5LH was highly popular with both Arriva's London and regional operations, where following the successful trial of the first four B5LHs delivered in 2009, Arriva made further orders of B5LHs for its operations in London, Kent, Manchester and Merseyside, Northumbria and Yorkshire, with a total of 259 examples being delivered with Wright Eclipse Gemini 2 bodies. The chassis was also delivered to Lothian Buses, with 20 Wright Gemini 3 bodied Volvo B5LHs delivered alongside a fleet of Volvo 7900H single deckers in 2015, followed by a further 20 Gemini 3 bodied B5LHs equipped with luggage racks in 2017 for use on Airlink and Skylink services to Edinburgh Airport.

Initially, Wrightbus has been the solitary double-decker body supplier of the chassis. The pre-production batch was fitted with Eclipse Gemini bodywork, and production chassis to date received Eclipse Gemini 2 body. A lighter Gemini 3 was later offered to the Euro VI version of the chassis. In March 2014, Volvo would secure a first order of the type from the Stagecoach Group for use on its Stagecoach Strathtay 'Tayway 73' service. These 18 buses were given Alexander Dennis Enviro400 MMC bodies and also were operated with conductors until 2020; a further 40 were delivered to Stagecoach London across two batches in 2015, while Go-Ahead London also took delivery of 16 Enviro400 MMC bodied B5LHs around the same time.

== Engines ==
D5E, 4764 cc, in-line 4 cyl. turbodiesel (2008–2009)

- D5E215 - 158 kW (215 bhp), 800 Nm, Euro V

D5F, 4764 cc, in-line 4 cyl. turbodiesel (2009–2013)

- D5F215 - 161 kW (219 bhp), 800 Nm, Euro V/EEV

D5K, 5132 cc, in-line 4 cyl. turbodiesel (2013—present)

- D5K240 - 177 kW (240 bhp), 918 Nm, Euro VI
