= Huanghai Bus =

Chinese bus manufacturer

- Native name: 黄海客车
- Company type: Subsidiary
- Industry: Automotive
- Founded: 1951
- Headquarters: Dandong, Liaoning, China
- Area served: Worldwide
- Products: Buses
- Number of employees: Approx. 2,385
- Parent: SG Automotive
- Website: Huanghai Bus

Huanghai Bus
- Simplified Chinese: 黄海客车
- Traditional Chinese: 黃海客車
- Literal meaning: Yellow Sea Bus
Transcriptions
Standard Mandarin
- Hanyu Pinyin: Huánghǎi Kèchē

Huanghai Bus is a bus manufacturer based in Dandong, Liaoning, China, and a subsidiary of SG Automotive. It was founded in 1951.

Huanghai has an annual production capacity of around 5,000 buses and 6,000 chassis sets. It produces around 20 bus series and 160 models, with vehicles ranging in length from 8 to over 18 meters. Huanghai manufactures buses based on MAN and Iveco technology.

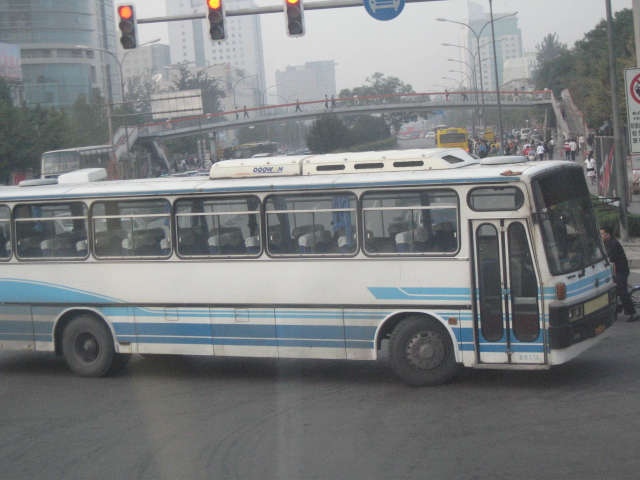
A Huanghai DD6112H2A coach in Beijing in 2005

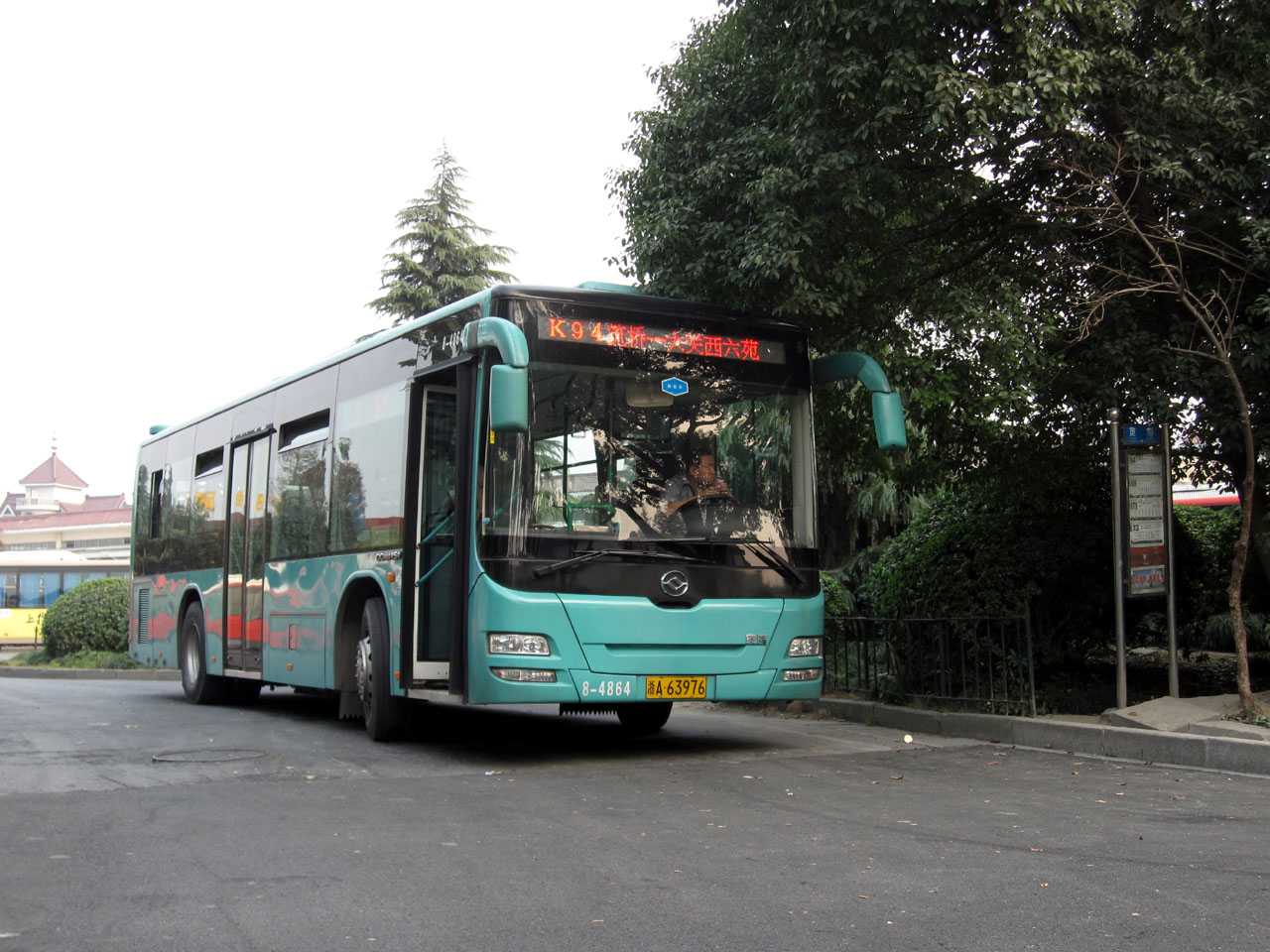

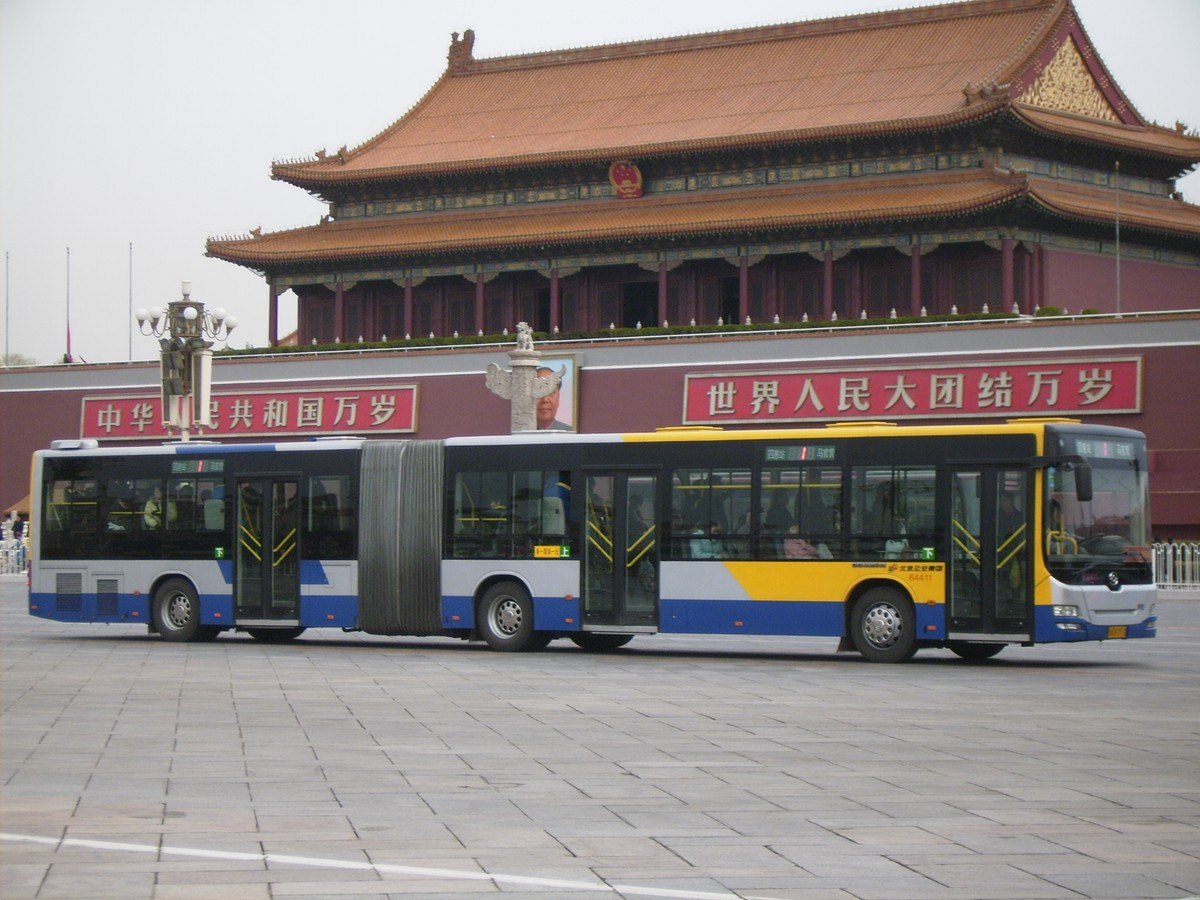
Huanghai Bus in Beijing

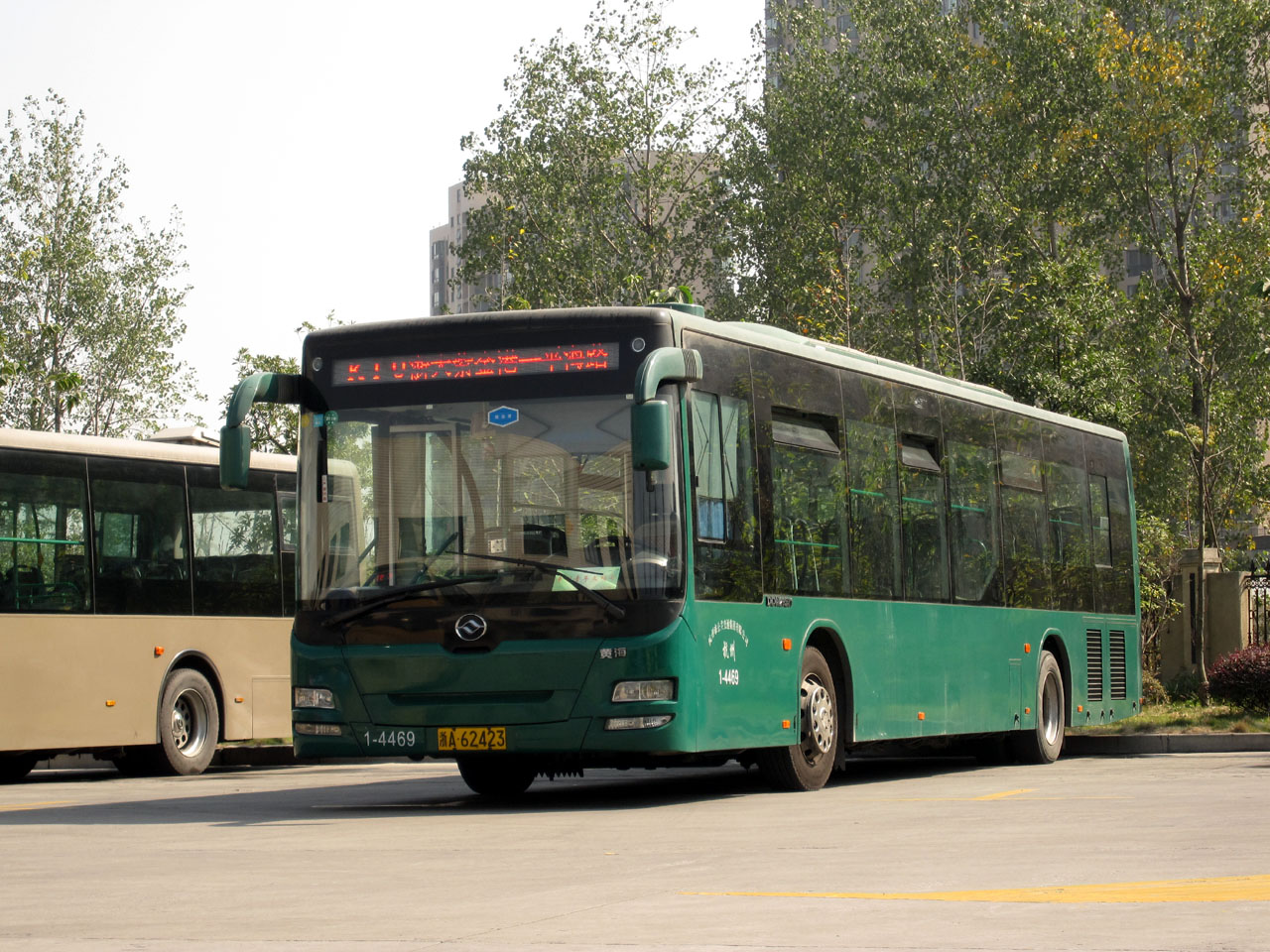

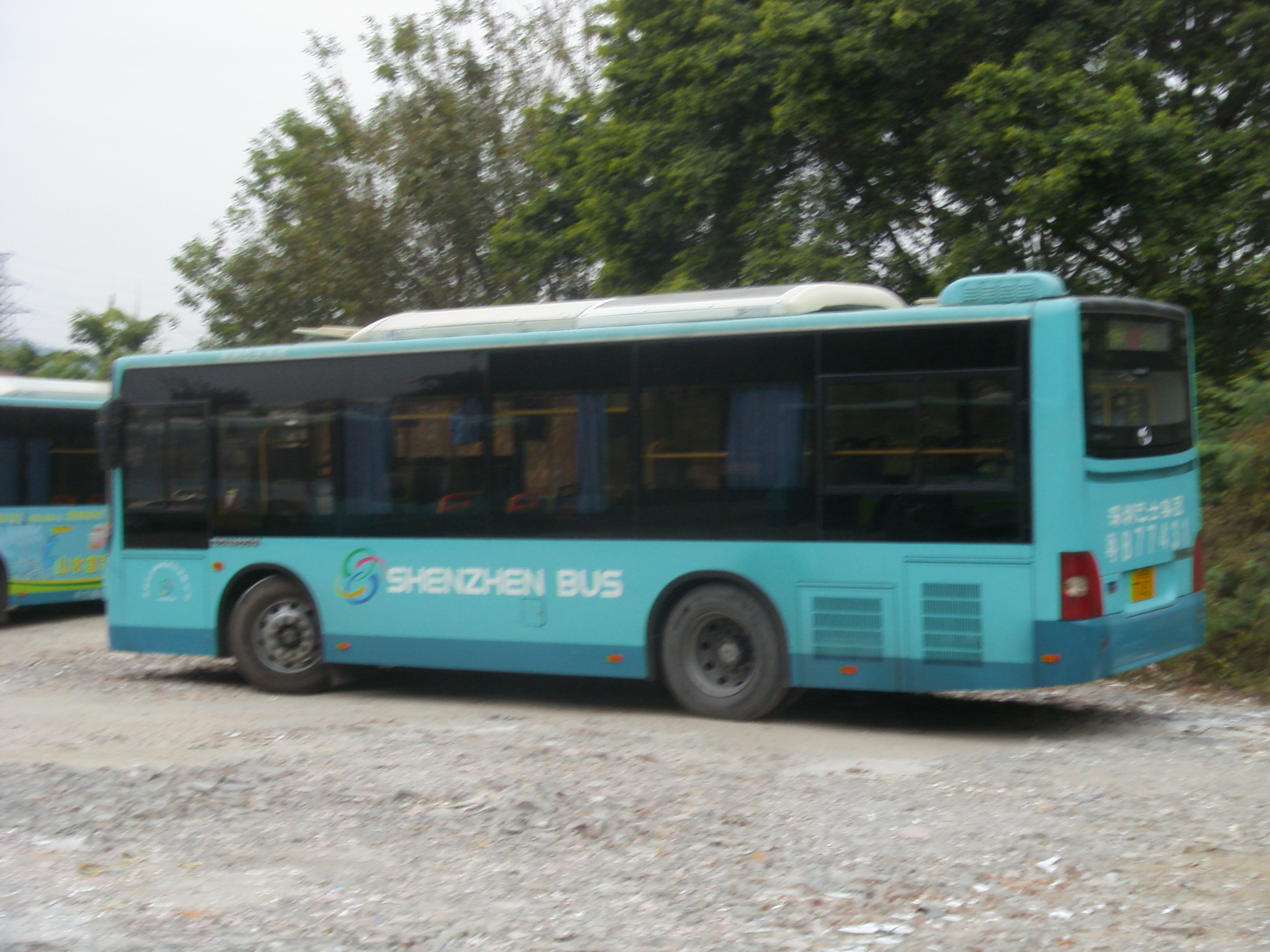
Huanghai DD6892S01 bus

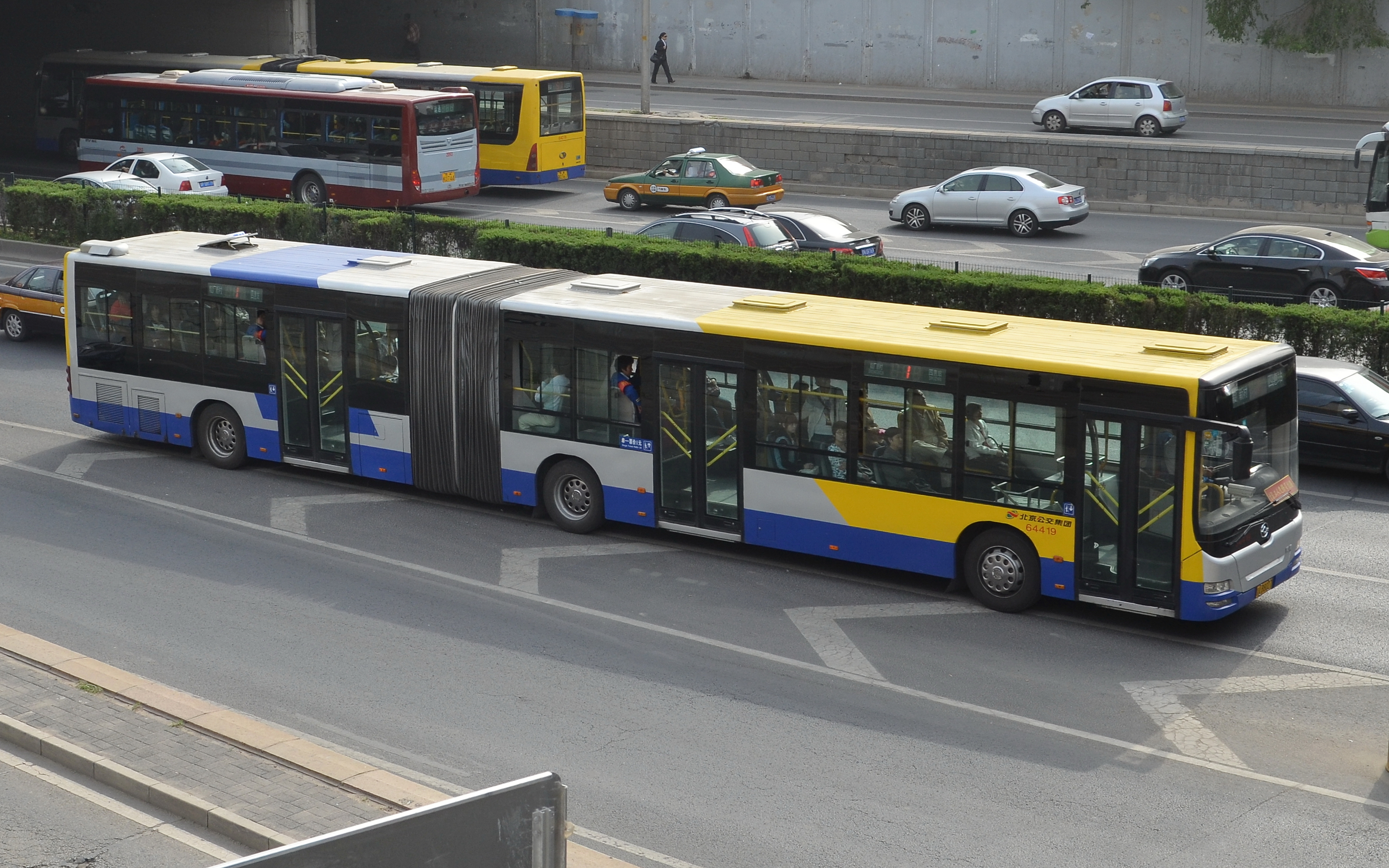
Huanghai DD6181S02 bus
