= Volvo B7L =

Low-floor rear-engined bus chassis

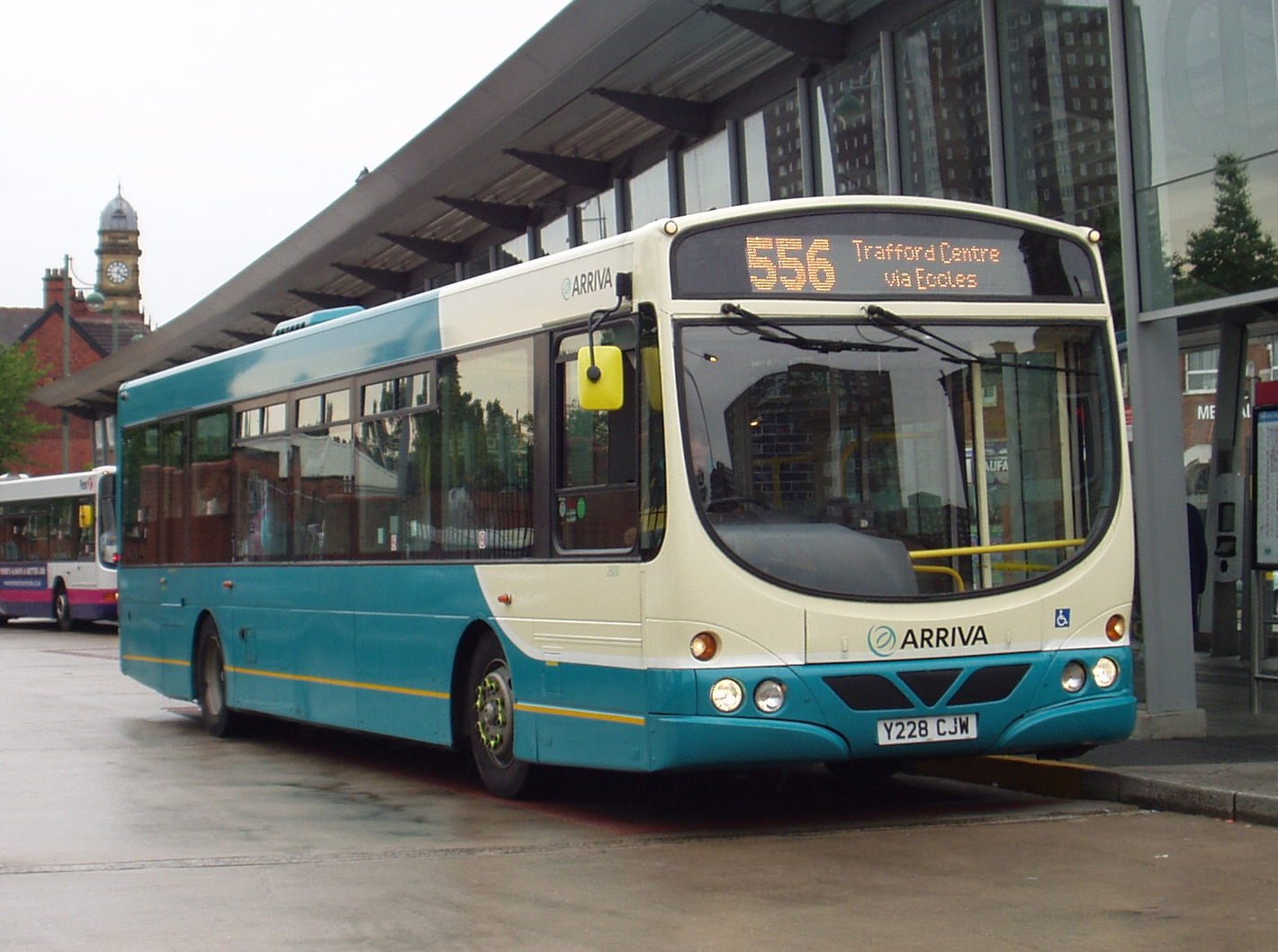
- Arriva North West Wright Eclipse Metro bodied Volvo B7L in Eccles, England in June 2008

Overview
- Manufacturer: Volvo
- Production: 1998–2007

Body and chassis
- Class: Bus chassis
- Body style: Single-decker bus Single-decker articulated bus Double-decker bus
- Doors: 1 door, 2 doors, 3 doors
- Floor type: Low floor
- Chassis: Volvo
- Related: Volvo B7R

Powertrain
- Engine: Volvo D7C
- Transmission: Voith DIWA864.3E/ ZF Ecomat 5HP502

Dimensions
- Length: 12.0 m (39 ft 4 in), 12.5 m (41 ft 0 in) and 18.0 m (59 ft 1 in)
- Width: 2.55 m (8 ft 4 in)
- Height: 3.0–4.4 m (9 ft 10 in – 14 ft 5 in)

Chronology
- Predecessor: Volvo B10L
- Successor: Volvo B9L

The Volvo B7L is a fully low floor single-decker bus, double-decker bus and articulated bus chassis with a rear engine mounted vertically on the left of the rear overhang. It was built as a replacement for the Volvo B10L, and the Volvo Olympian, used as both a single-decker bus and a double-decker bus chassis largely in Continental Europe. The Volvo B7L was superseded by the Volvo B9L in 2007.

== Design ==
Whilst similar to the B10L in design, both featuring a side-mounted engine, the B7L's engine was a Volvo D7C 7.3 litres (1.6 imp gal; 1.9 US gal) unit mounted vertically, as opposed to the horizontally mounted Volvo DH10/GH10 engine of the B10L; the radiator was mounted above the engine instead of the right-hand side, allowing the floor to be lower behind the rear axle. As with the B10L, B7L was also available in its articulated form, named the B7LA.

The B7L was also available as an integrally-constructed Volvo bus for Continental Europe - the Volvo 5000 (later renumbered 7500) which was assembled with aluminium bodywork, and the Volvo 7000 (later renumbered 7700) which was assembled with stainless steel bodywork. Capable of carrying over 100 passengers, these integral buses featured an entirely flat floor and three doors, the first two having a floor height of 320 millimetres (13 in) that was capable of lowering to 230 millimetres (9.1 in) via the "kneeling" function of the chassis.

Unlike the B10L, the B7L was sold only with diesel combustion engines; integrally constructed Volvo 7000s with CNG engines were only available on the B10L chassis. CNG engines would later be reintroduced with the launch of the B9L chassis in 2005.

== Operators ==
=== United Kingdom and Ireland ===
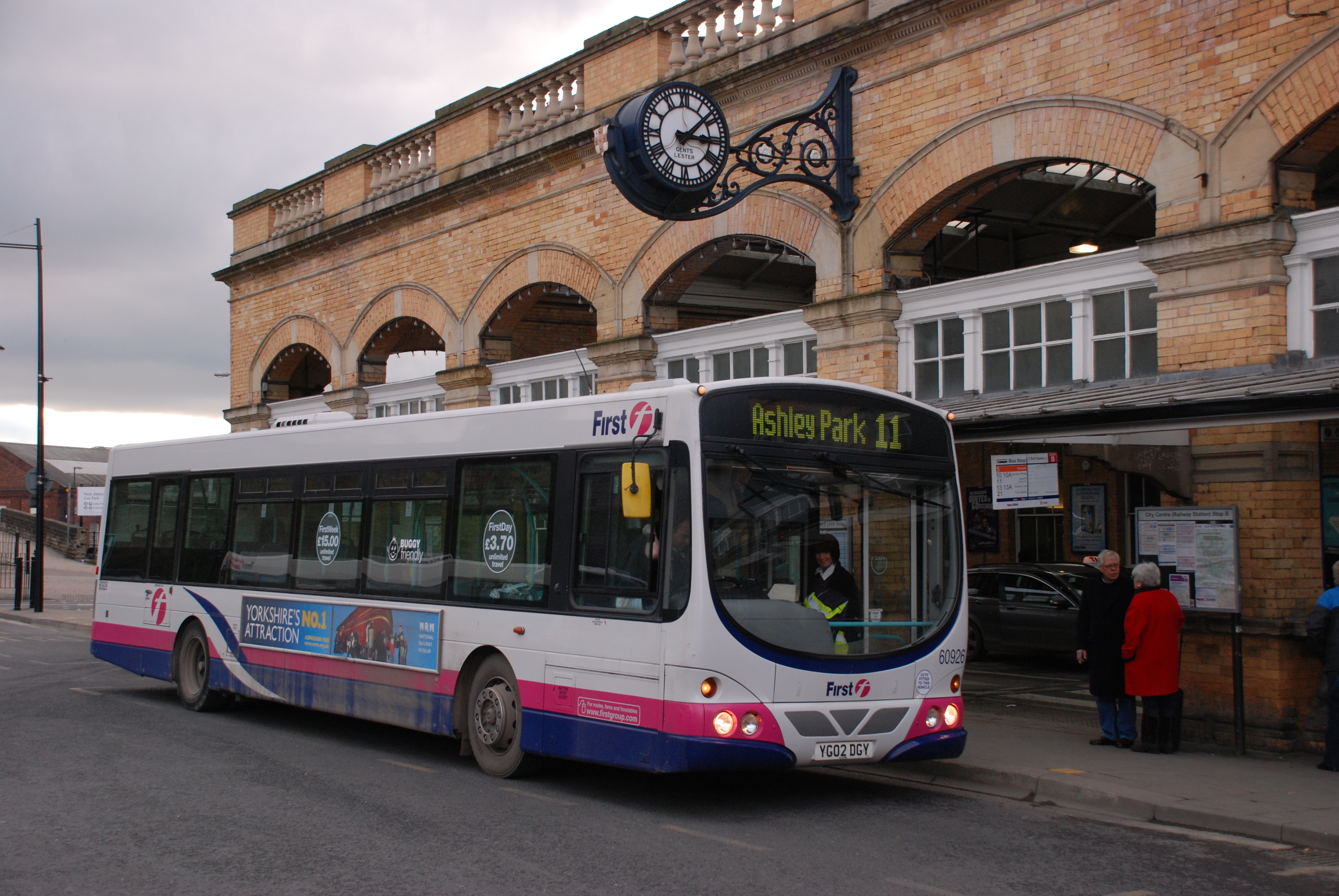
First York Wright Eclipse Metro bodied Volvo B7L outside York railway station in February 2011

The B7L chassis was first introduced in the United Kingdom in 2000 as a replacement for the Volvo B10BLE and Olympian. The chassis could be fitted with a Wright Eclipse body (and Eclipse Fusion body for B7LA), as well as being demonstrated with Hispano Carrocera bodywork, however the chassis proved unpopular with UK operators due to the arrangement of engine and radiator limiting seating capacity, with FirstGroup being the only major customer. Volvo responded by introducing the B7RLE and the B7TL for the UK market, fitted with more conventional Transverse engines.

In Ireland, Bus Éireann purchased 25 B7Ls with Wright bodies between 2001 & 2003. One demonstrator with Wrightbus bodywork was also delivered to Northern Irish operator Ulsterbus as a demonstrator in 2001, however no further orders resulted.

The double-decker version of B7L was also sold in the United Kingdom, with ten bodied with East Lancs Nordic bodywork for use as a public bus with First Glasgow in 2002, or with the Ayats Bravo City open-top body for sightseeing services. The Plaxton President body was launched on a pre-production B7L chassis at the Coach & Bus '97 expo, however this design did not prove successful and resulted in the body being redesigned for fitment on the B7TL chassis.

In 2005, Wrightbus unveiled the Wright StreetCar, a tram-like articulated bus built on a modified B7LA chassis; the chassis has a shorter front overhang, the driver's cab was relocated to above the front axle and the radiator was relocated to the roof, giving the body a full-width rear window. Only 39 StreetCars built on the B7LA chassis were purchased by the FirstGroup, being used on its ftr bus rapid transit networks in Leeds, Swansea and York.

=== Continental Europe ===
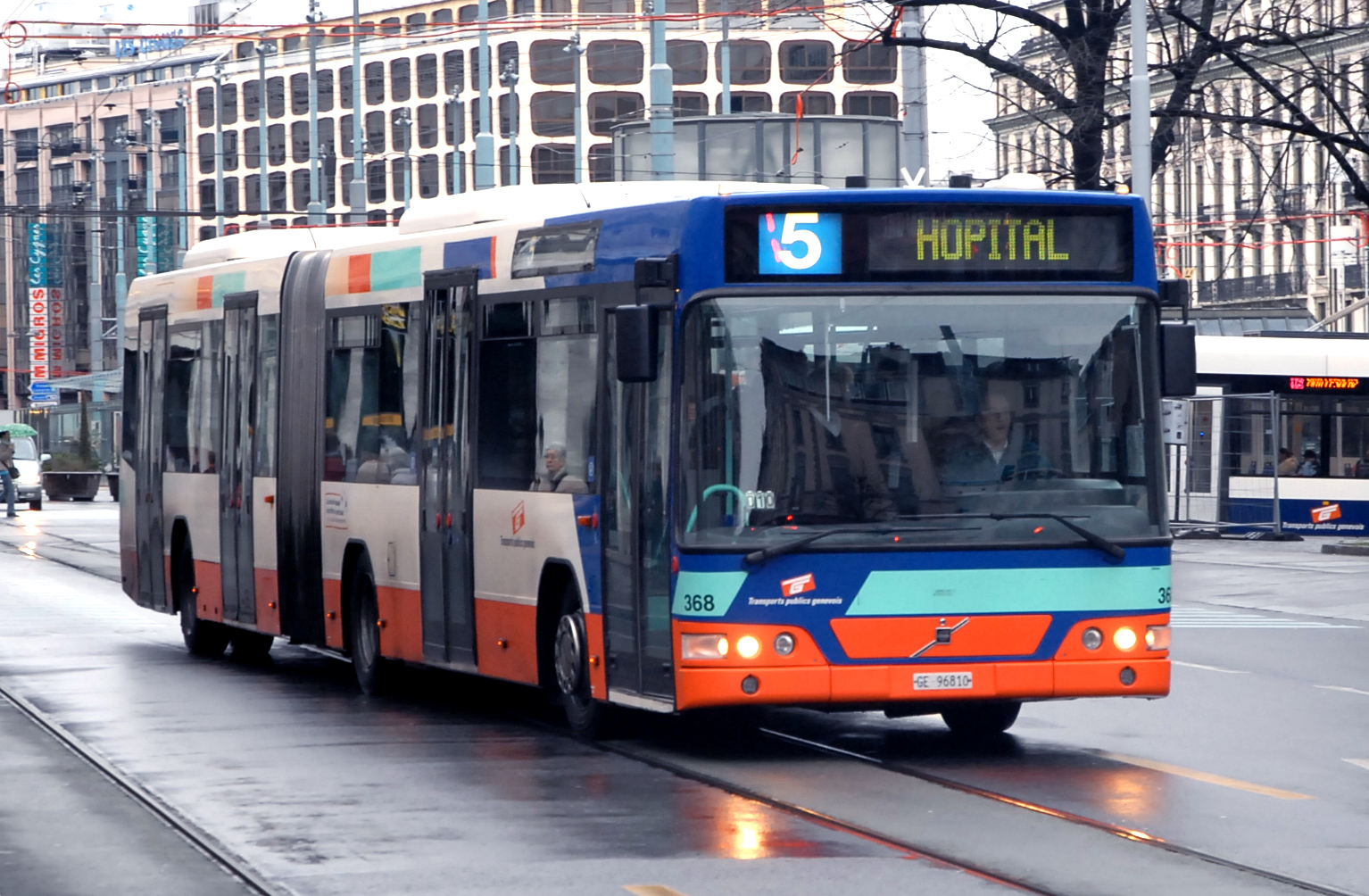
Volvo 7000A bodied Volvo B7LA in Geneva, Switzerland in 2007

Volvo B7L and B7LA-based buses are used in Greece. In Athens, Volvo B7LAs constructed with Saracakis bodies have been operated since 1999, with a further 62 B7Ls and 56 B7LAs, all with Elbo bodies, delivered to the city following the conclusion of the 2004 Summer Olympics. In Thessaloniki, local operator OASTH took delivery of 54 B7Ls and 22 B7LAs, all built with ELVO bodies, between 2004 and 2005; subsequent deliveries of B7Ls and B7LAs to OATSH would follow between 2005 and 2006. Eventually in 2019-2023 the 92 B7LAs were mostly withdrawn due to serious chassis defects.

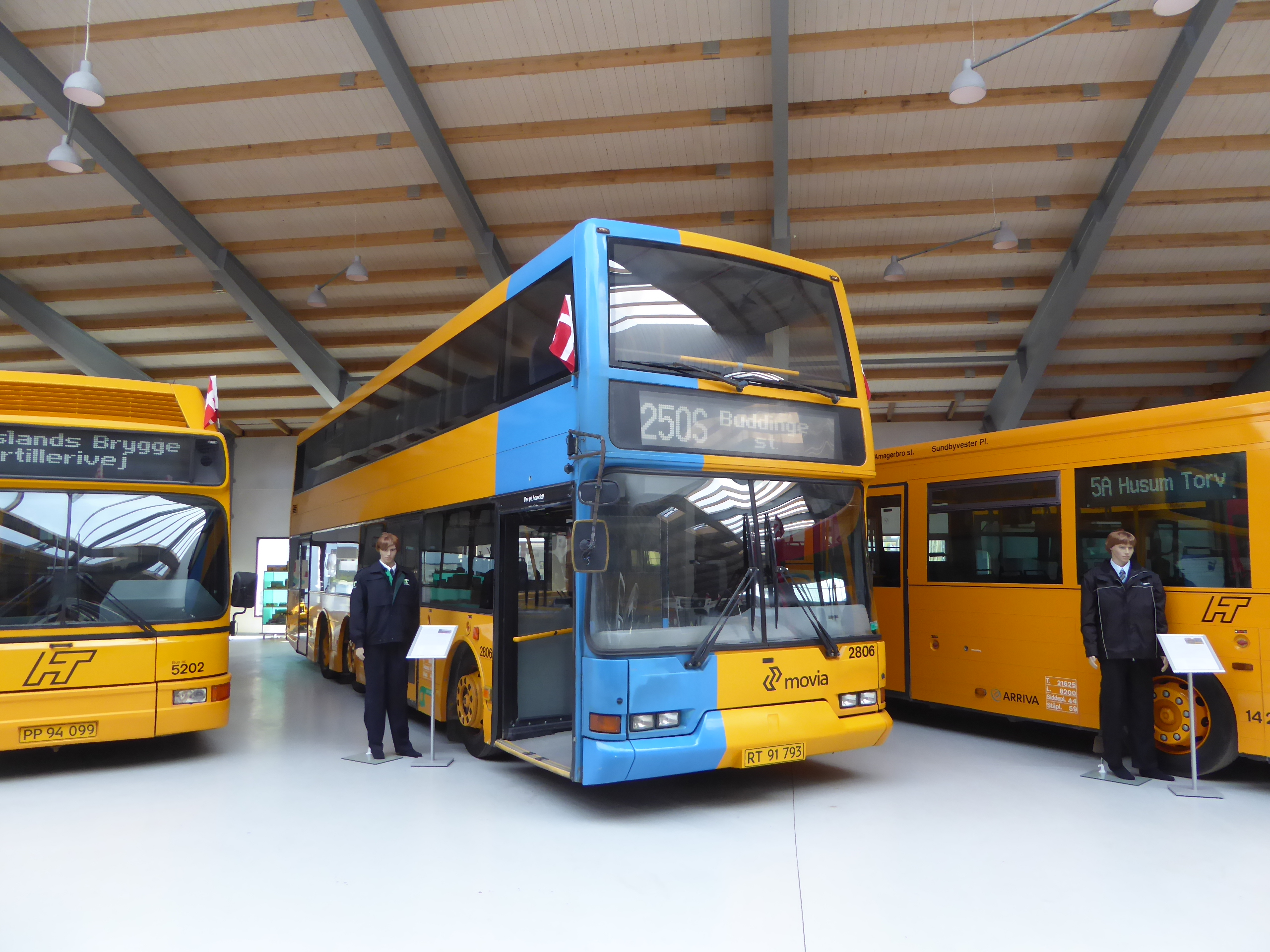
Preserved Movia East Lancs Nordic bodied Volvo B7L at the Skjoldenæsholm Tram Museum

In Denmark, Copenhagen was the only city in Continental Europe to operate closed-top double-decker B7L public buses. 22 East Lancs Nordic bodied Volvo B7Ls were delivered to City-Trafik between 2000 and 2001, with an additional 14 delivered to Arriva Danmark over the same period. All would be withdrawn from service by 2018, with many being converted to open-toppers and exported worldwide for use as sightseeing buses; the final Nordic left in original condition was purchased from Movia by the Skjoldenæsholm Tram Museum and restored to original livery.

=== Israel ===
The Volvo B7L was also popular in Israel, with most being built with Merkavim Mercury bodies, though some Israeli B7Ls have also been built with Hispano Habit bodies. The first B7L in Israel, an integral Volvo 7000 demonstrator, was introduced into service by Egged for demonstration in the cities of Haifa, Jerusalem and Tel Aviv in 1999.

Operators of the B7L in Israel include Metrodan Beersheba, who purchased B7Ls with both body styles, and Egged, Kavim, Metropoline and who purchased B7Ls built almost exclusively with Merkavim Mercury bodies.

== See also ==
Media related to Volvo B7L at Wikimedia Commons

- List of buses
