= Single-deck bus =

Bus with a single deck for passengers

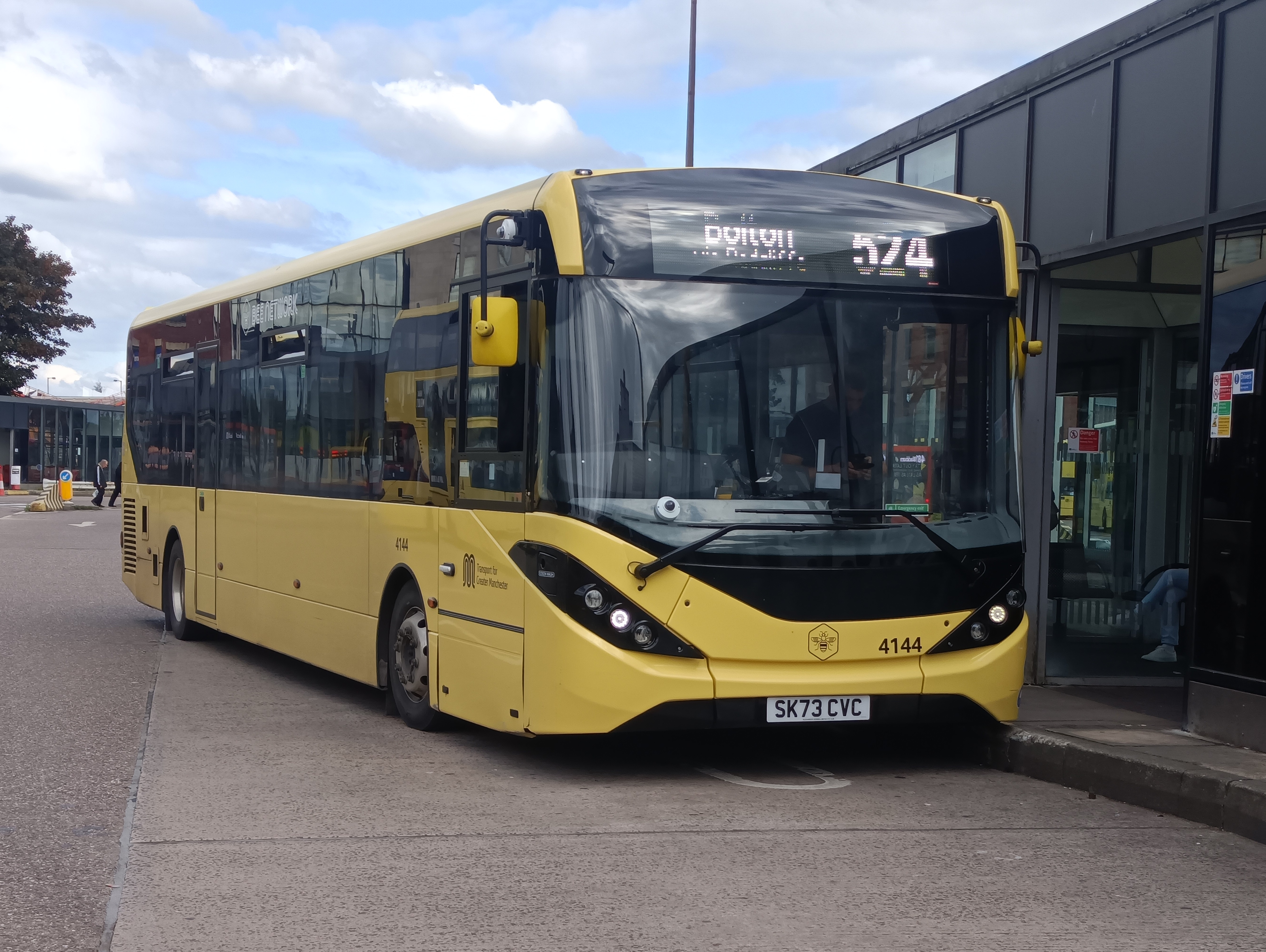
A single deck Alexander Dennis Enviro200 MMC low-floor bus operated by Go North West in the United Kingdom

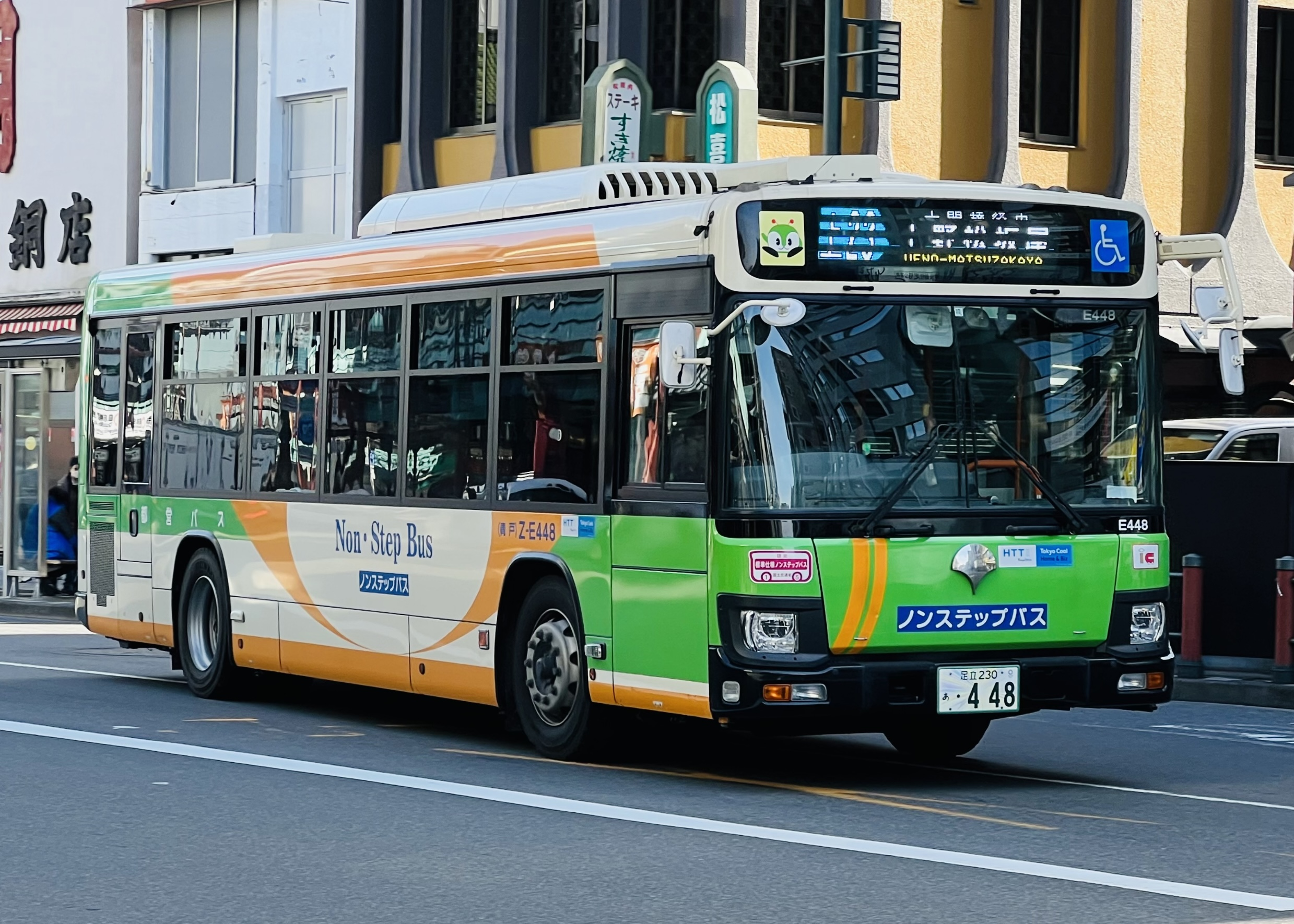
A single deck Toei Bus Isuzu Erga operating in Tokyo, Japan

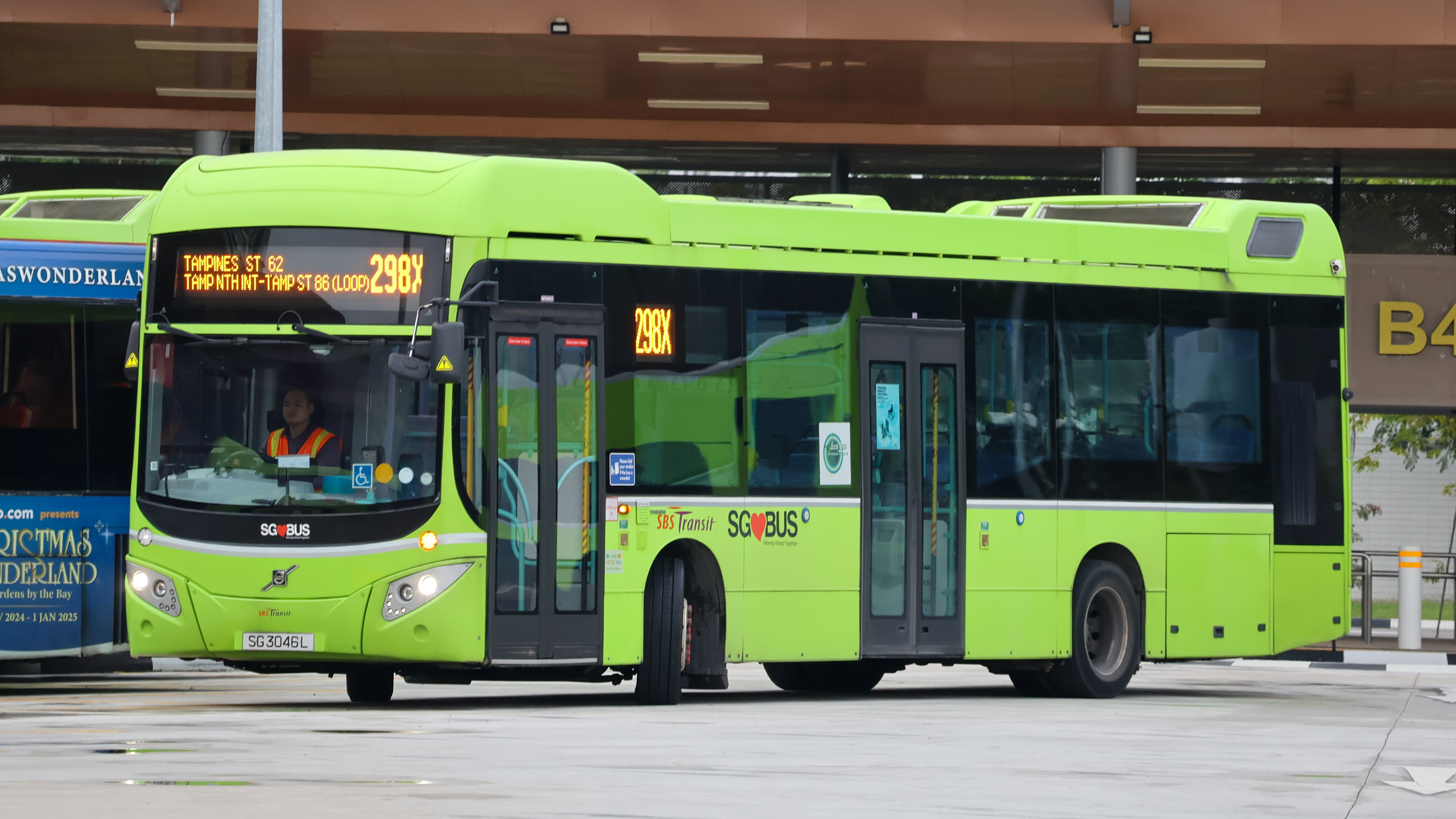
A single deck MCV Evora bodied Volvo B5LH operated by SBS Transit in Singapore.

A single-decker bus or single-deck bus, is a bus that has a single deck for passengers. Normally the use of the term single-decker refers to a standard two-axled rigid bus, in direct contrast to the use of the term double-decker bus, which is essentially a bus with two passenger decks and a staircase. These types of single-deckers may feature one or more doors, and varying internal combustion engine, battery and electric motor positions. The majority of single-deckers have a length of up to 12 m (39 ft 4 in), although some exceptions of longer buses exist. They also typically weigh between 11 and 14 t (12 and 15 short tons).

In regions where double-deckers are not common, the term single-decker may lack common usage, as in one sense, all other main types of bus have a single deck. Also, the term may become synonymous with the name transit bus or related terms, which can correctly be applied to double-deckers too.

With the exception of regions of major double deck or articulated bus operation, usually major urban areas such as Hong Kong, cities in the United Kingdom, China, Malaysia and Singapore, the single decker is the standard mode of public transport bus travel, increasingly with Low entry or Low floor features.

With their origins in van chassis, minibuses are not usually considered single-deckers, although modern minibus designs blur this distinction. Midibuses can also be regarded as both included with and separate from standard single-deckers, in terms of full size length and vehicle weights, although again design developments have seen this distinction blurred. Some coach style buses that do not have underfloor luggage space can also be correctly termed as single-deckers, with some sharing standard bus chassis designs, such as the Volvo B10M, with a different body style applied.

== Notable examples of single-deck buses (excluding coaches, trolleybuses and minibuses) ==
- Alexander Dennis Enviro200
- Alexander Dennis Enviro200 MMC
- Alexander Dennis Enviro200EV
- Alexander Dennis Enviro300
- Alexander Dennis Enviro350H
- BYD K8
- BYD K9
- BYD B10
- BYD B12A
- BYD B12A03/BC12A04 (3-Door)
- Caetano City Gold
- Daewoo BC212MA
- Daewoo BS105
- DAC 112UDM
- DAF SB220
- Dennis Dart
- Dennis Falcon
- Dennis Lance/Lance SLF
- Designline Olympus
- Foton BJ6109EVCA
- Foton BJ6129EVCA
- Golden Dragon XML6105JEVD0C1
- Hino Blue Ribbon
- Hino Rainbow
- Huanghai DD6118S11
- Huanghai DD6118K30
- Huanghai DD6129S06
- Higer KLQ6112G
- Higer KLQ6129G
- Ikarus 260
- Irisbus Agoraline
- Irisbus Citelis
- Irizar ie tram
- Isuzu Erga
- Isuzu Cubic
- Iveco TurboCity
- Iveco Urbanway
- Ikarus 415 and the Ikarus 415T
- Jinghua BK6118
- Jinghua BK6129K
- King Long XMQ6118G
- King Long XMQ6121G
- King Long XMQ6125G
- King Long XMQ6125G1
- King Long XMQ6127G
- King Long XMQ6127GH1
- King Long XMQ6106AGBEVM2
- King Long XMQ6106AGBEVL31
- Linkker LM312 (Gemilang Coachworks)
- MAN NL262
- MAN NLxx3F
- MAZ-103
- MAZ-203
- Mercedes-Benz O530 Citaro Integral
- Mercedes-Benz O305
- Mercedes-Benz O405
- Mercedes-Benz O500M/U
- Mercedes-Benz OC500LE
- Mercedes-Benz OF-OH
- Mitsubishi Fuso Aero Star
- Nissan Diesel Space Runner RA
- Nova Bus LFS
- New Flyer Low Floor
- Optare Excel
- Optare Tempo
- Optare Tempo SR
- Orion VII
- Renault PR100.2
- Rocar De Simon U412
- Scania Citywide
- Scania KUB
- Scania L113
- Scania L94UB
- Scania NUB
- Scania N113
- Scania N94UB
- Scania OmniCity
- Scania Fencer
- Sksbus SA12-300
- Solaris Urbino 12
- Sunwin iEV10/iEV12
- Thaco TB120CT
- VDL SB200
- VDL SB250
- Volvo B7RLE
- Volvo B8RLE
- Volvo B9L
- Volvo B10B
- Volvo B10BLE
- Volvo B10M
- Volvo B12BLE
- Volvo B5LH (MCV Evora)
- Volvo BZL
- Optare Prisma
- Optare Solo
- Optare Solo SR
- Optare Solo Plus
- Optare Versa
- Wright GB Hawk
- Wright GB Kite
- Youngman JNP6105GR
- Youngman JNP6120GR
- Youngman JNP6122G
- Yutong ZK6126HG
- Yutong E10/E12 Integral
- Yutong U12 Integral
- Zhongtong N10/N12 Integral

== See also ==
- Bus rapid transit
- List of buses
- List of bus operating companies
- Tram
