= JJT (disambiguation) =

JJT may refer to:

- Joanna Jesh Transport, one of the largest city bus companies in the Philippines
- Johnson Jakande Tinubu (JJT) Park, a public park located close in Ikeja, Lagos
- John J. Tuchi, an American lawyer
- John J. Tierney, the former president of the Boston City Council
