= Philtranco =

Bus company in the Philippines

Philtranco Service Enterprises, Inc.

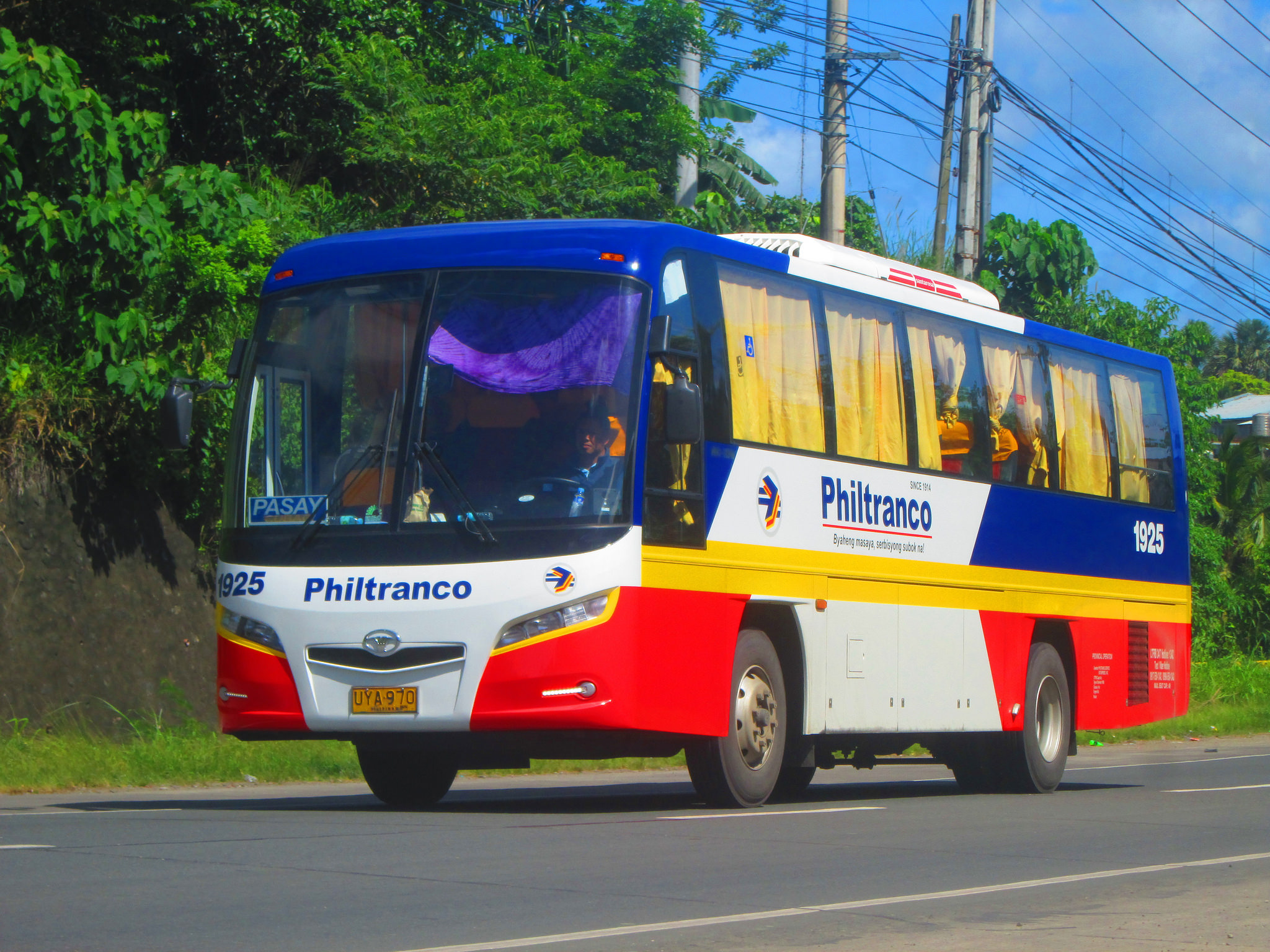
- Philtranco Bus heading back to Pasay and Cubao.
- Formerly: A. L. Ammen Transport Company (ALATCO) (1914–1971); Pantranco South Express, Inc. (PSEI) (1971–1984)
- Founded: July 1, 1914; 112 years ago
- Ceased operation: March 30, 2026; 5 months ago
- Service area: Bicol Region; Eastern Visayas; Caraga; Davao Region; Northern Mindanao
- Service type: Provincial Operation
- Alliance: Archipelago Philippine Ferries Corporation; Amihan Bus Lines; Philtouristers Inc.; Mantrade Inc.
- Hubs: Pasay
- Chief executive: Michael Sabban

Philtranco Service Enterprises, Inc. (/fɪltrɑːnkoʊ/, Tagalog: [pilˈtɾaŋkɔ]; Philippine Transportation Company) was a bus company in the Philippines, servicing routes to Bicol, Eastern Visayas, Caraga, Davao Region, and Northern Mindanao. It is the oldest bus operator in the Philippines and in Asia. It is also the only bus carrier with a nationwide public transport franchise.

It is set to cease operations on March 30, 2026, amid mounting losses, but the management has clarified that it is just a temporary suspension of operations, which could pave the way to a possible reopening once the business climate has improved.

== History ==
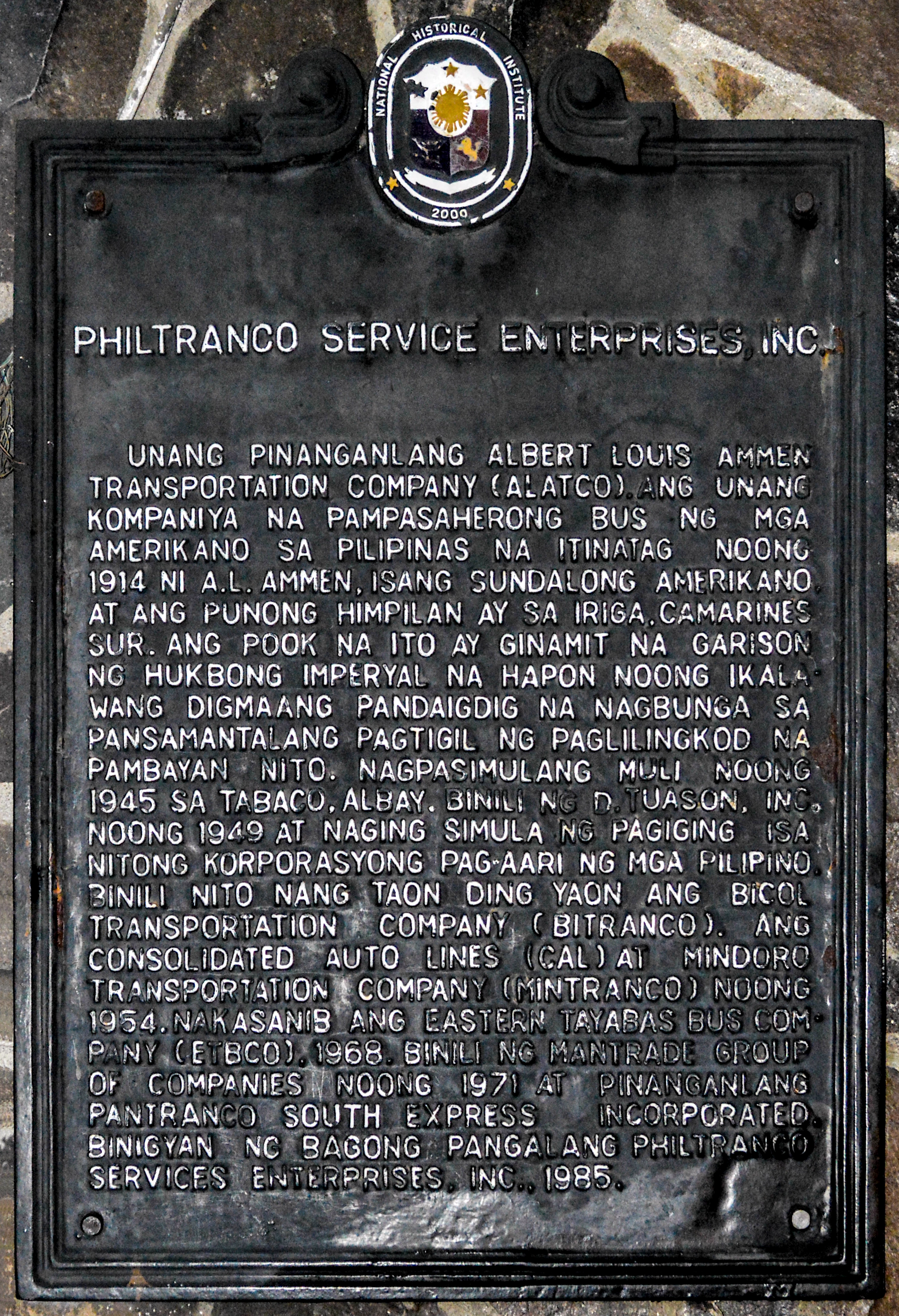
Historical marker dedicated to Philtranco at the Philtranco Transport Heritage Museum.

=== ALATCO ===
Philtranco traces its origins to July 1, 1914, when American soldier Albert Louise Ammen, together with Max Blouse founded the A.L. Ammen Transport Company (ALATCO), a small transportation company in Iriga, Camarines Sur. The company began operations with an initial fleet of a single auto truck serving the Iriga-Naga route. In the succeeding years, ALATCO expanded its services across the provinces of Camarines Sur, Camarines Norte, Albay and Sorsogon, becoming a major transport operator in the Bicol region.

The outbreak of World War II in 1942 temporarily halted the company's expansion. Operations resumed in 1945, with the company using surplus United States Navy trucks acquired through the United States Commercial Company. However, during the post-war period, the company faced intense competition and operational difficulties. In 1949, ownership of ALATCO was transferred to the heirs of Don Nicasio Tuazon in Manila, who infused new capital into the company and initiated a rehabilitation and expansion program that included the conversion of gasoline-powered engines to diesel engines.

By 1952, ALATCO operated a fleet of approximately 400 units, with its main facilities being based in Irigas and subsidiary shops located across the provinces of Daet and Labo in Camarines Norte; Naga, Camarines Sur; Ligao, Tabaco, and Legaspi in Albay, and Sorsogon and Irosin in Sorsogon. The following year, the company expanded into Quezon province by consolidating several local bus operators under the Eastern Tayabas Bus Company (ETBCO), which later entered into a 5-year lease agreement with the Laguna Tayabas Bus Company.

=== PSEI ===
In 1971, ALATCO and ETBCO were sold to the Mantrade Group of the Lopa and Cojuangco families. The two companies' operations were then merged and reorganized as Pantranco South Express, Inc. (PSEI), distinct from Pantranco North Express, Inc. Due to rising fuel costs and global economic conditions in the early 1970s, PSEI was strapped in debt and was subject to a creditor takeover in 1973. This led to a corporate rehabilitation being implemented the following year, during which the company expanded inter-island operations through partnerships with passenger ferry operators serving Catanduanes, Samar, and Masbate.

PSEI introduced air-conditioned coaches on its southern routes in 1978 and expanded its freight services in 1980, relocating its central offices and terminal to its present site in Pasay. In 1981, the company extended its network into Eastern Visayas and entered sea transport operations, operating ferry services between Matnog, Sorsogon and Allen, Northern Samar. Further service upgrades followed in 1982 with the introduction of its higher-end Royal Class and new air-conditioned coaches with onboard toilets and videocassette recorder entertainment systems. PSEI also became the first bus company in the Philippines to computerize its operations.

=== Philtranco ===
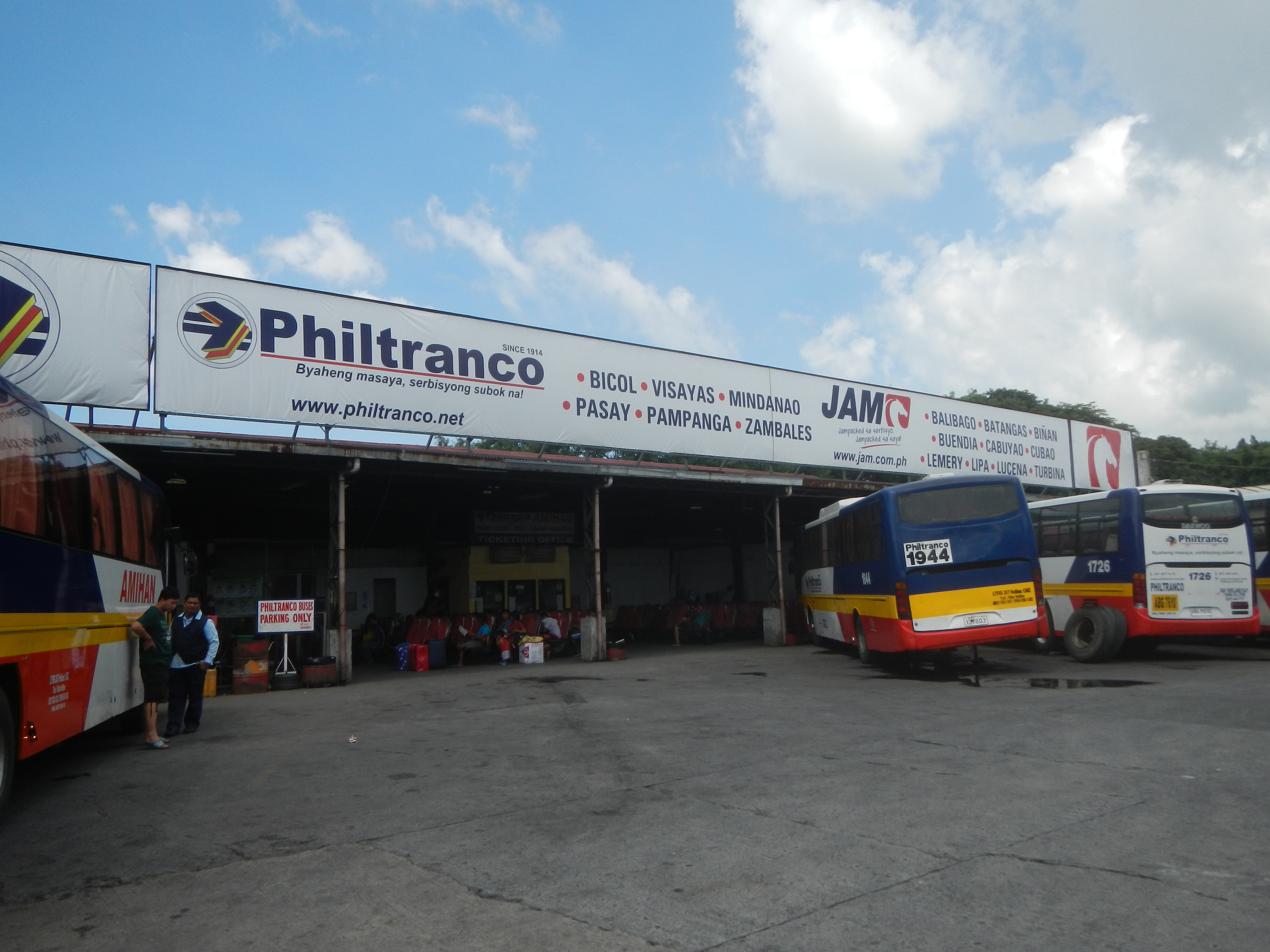
Calamba, Laguna terminal. c. 2019.

In 1984, PSEI became part of a joint venture that formed the St. Bernard Services Corporation, which operated ferry services across the San Bernardino Strait. In the same year, the company was renamed Philtranco Service Enterprises, Inc. In 1986, Philtranco launched its first integrated Luzon–Visayas–Mindanao bus-and-ferry service, connecting Luzon with Visayas and Mindanao through intermodal transport routes.

In April 1999, Philtranco was acquired by the Penta Pacific Realty Corporation led by businessman Jose C.H. Alvarez. The new ownership initiated a fleet replacement of 80 units costing PHP250 million. In June 2000, the company introduced its 29-seater Gold Service Bus premium bus service, which featured airline-style passenger check-in and baggage tagging systems, the first in the Philippines to do so.

By 2004, the company was considered as the only integrated land and sea transport company in the Philippines. That same year, in response to then-Philippine president Gloria Macapagal Arroyo's push to modernize the country's land and sea transportation system, Philtranco announced a PHP4 billion (US$75 million) investment program to acquire new fleet of buses and ferry boats, and improve and expand its terminals.

During the late 2000s and 2010s, Philtranco continued to introduce new bus models. It participated in the Public Utility Vehicle Modernization Program, phasing out older units beginning in 2014. In 2016, Philtranco participated in a joint modernization initiative with the Archipelago Philippine Ferries Corporation and its affiliate Jam Liner, aimed at expanding integrated transport services nationwide.

In 2025, Philtranco and its subsidiary Amihan Bus Lines temporarily suspended operations due to financial difficulties but later resumed services. In February 2026, the company announced plans to cease operations by March 30, 2026, citing sustained business losses that rendered continued operations unsustainable. However the management later clarified that it would temporarily suspend its operations. Yohance Express acquired the Pasay–Cagayan de Oro route, which resumed on March 15.

== Terminals ==
- Pasay – EDSA corner, Apelo Cruz St, Pasay
- Daet, Camarines Norte – 3 Gov Panotes Ave, Daet, Camarines Norte
- Naga – Naga City Central Bus Terminal, Triangulo, Diversion Road, Naga
- Iriga – San Nicolas Maharlika Highway, Iriga
- Legazpi – Legazpi Grand Central Terminal, Bitano, Legazpi
- Iloilo – Land height II, Brgy. Buntatala, Tagbak, Jaro, Iloilo City
- Tacloban – Tacloban Bus Terminal, Brgy. Abucay, Tacloban
- Cagayan de Oro – Agora Bus Terminal, Brgy. Lapasan, Cagayan de Oro
- Davao – Candelaria Street, Ecoland Bus Terminal, Davao City
- Surigao – Lipata Port, Surigao City
- Tandag – Tandag City Bus Terminal, Tandag
