= CEM Trans Services =

Bus company in the Philippines

CEM Trans Services, Inc. Crisinciano E. Mahilac Transport Services, Inc.
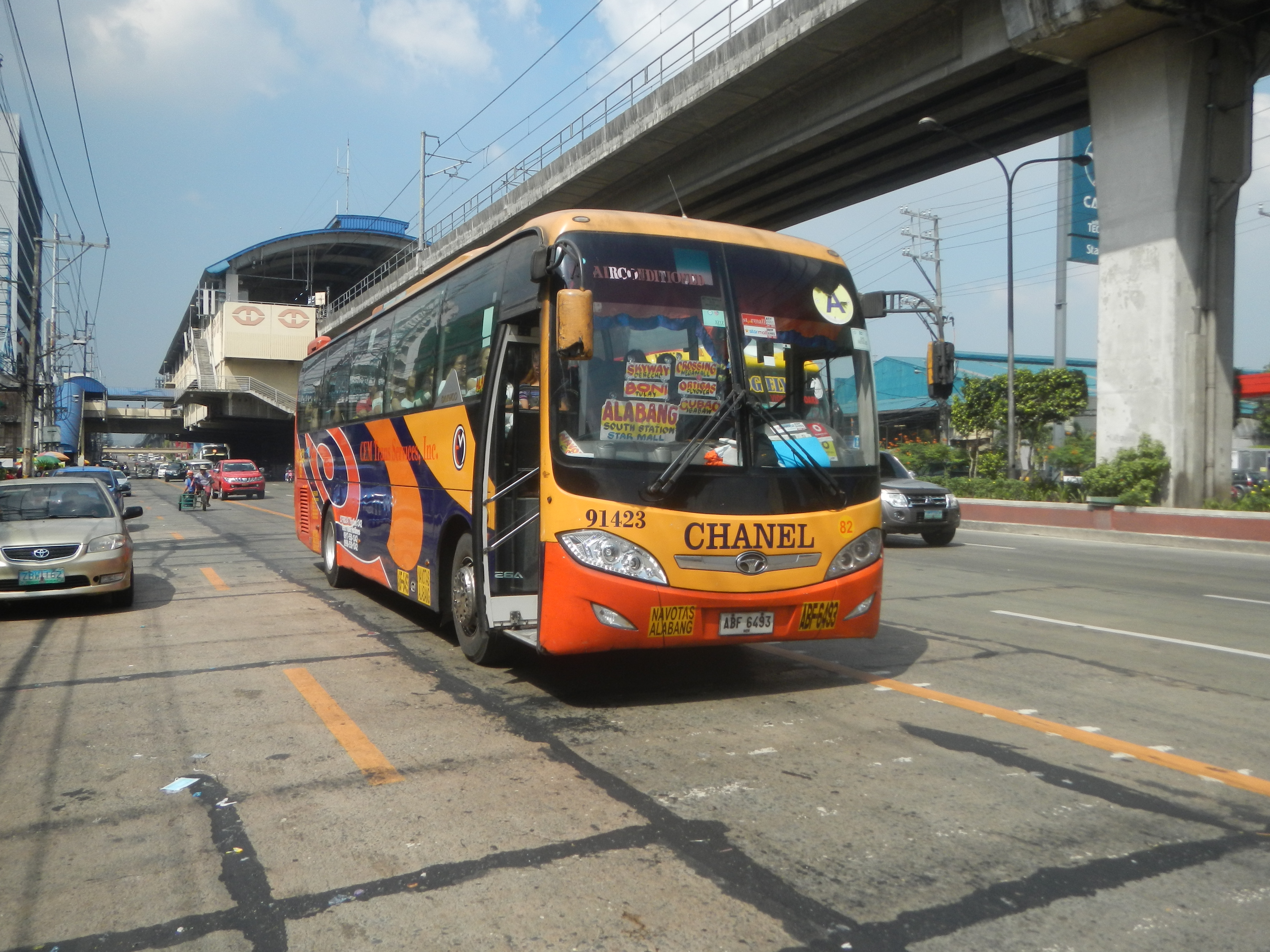
- Founded: 2007 (CEM Trans Services, Inc. December 2018
- Headquarters: San Jose del Monte, Bulacan
- Service area: FTI, Alabang, NAIA, SJDM, Ayala
- Service type: City Operation
- Fleet: 180+ Buses (Nissan Diesel, Daewoo, Iveco and Volvo)
- Operator: CEM Trans Services, Inc.

CEM Trans Services, Inc. (Crisinciano E. Mahilac Transport Services Inc.) is a city bus company known for the use of an animated character Road Runner (which was said to be used by Partas) This company plies routes to parts of Quezon City, Valenzuela City and San Jose del Monte, Bulacan. This company is a sister company of Joanna Jesh Transport

== Etymology ==
The acronym CEM is derived from Crisinciano E. Mahilac, the founder of Joanna Jesh Transport and its subsidiaries.

== History ==
CEM Trans. Services Inc. was established in October 2007 under the management of Crisinciano E. Mahilac, the founder of Joanna Jesh Transport and other mentioned companies under the Mahilac Group. It started with non-aircon buses plying the FTI-SM Fairview route until the company acquired more units plying FTI-Grotto (San Jose del Monte). They also acquired 3 Daewoo units purchased from Renan Transit in June 2008. Recently, they reflected into new air-conditioned Nissan Diesel Euro buses.

In August 2008, CEM Trans acquired the new air-conditioned units plying the Alabang-Malanday route. This is due to the large financial funds of the said company combined with the other bus companies under the Joanna Jesh Group.

Lastly, in December 2008, CEM Trans. acquired new air-conditioned units plying the NAIA-Grotto route.

CEM Trans. acquired new buses and formed an Alabang-Navotas route in 2011. A year later, they expanded their route Alabang-SM Fairview route since the company acquired one of former Renan Transit's Daewoo ordinary bus and used it for the latter route before it has been replaced by new air-conditioned buses.

== Recent Incidents ==
Like her sister companies under the Mahilac Group, CEM Trans Services, Inc. has been involved in a road accident like the accident that happened in Amparo, Caloocan, plying the route to Tungko/Grotto (San Jose del Monte), when a bus flipped over the wall at Quirino Highway on February 2, 2008, resulting in an injury of 20 passengers aboard.

The same unit also has involved in a failed collision with the Philippine National Railways train near Nichols station where 15 passengers were injured while panicking to get out of the bus and rushed to Taguig Hospital. The driver, Elvin Araza, who was able to pass the bus at PNR Access Road going to the northbound lane of South Luzon Expressway, was charged at Taguig city police station by the passengers who are aboard the bus.

CEM Trans has put up also a bad image of their employees, especially their bus conductors. In an article on People's Tonight last May 12, 2009, a bus conductor boarding CEM Trans with bus no. 9114-47 plying Alabang-Malanday route had allegedly disrespected a disabled passenger. The conductor charged that passenger a PHP30.00 ticket, though the fare must be discounted because the passenger is actually disabled, resulting in a unanimous debate between the two. Glicerio Cabigayan, the conductor boarding the said bus unit, was given expulsion by the operator Crisinciano E. Mahilac as a result of his grievance against the passenger.

== Recent Updates ==
CEM Trans. Services Inc. was created as an initiative in the regards of lack of many buses bound to SM City Fairview which was situated at Food Terminal Inc. (FTI) in Taguig from the defunct HR Lines, where its latter's franchise was given to the Mahilac Group last 2006. Its sister company, Nicholas Albert Transport Inc., was the first to be created under the defunct bus company. She was followed by CEM Trans a year later.

As of today, CEM Trans is utilizing Nissan and Iveco units. This also includes the acquired Daewoo non-aircon units from Renan Transit. Additionally, CEM Trans acquired a Volvo B7RLE, Daewoo BF106, Daewoo BS106, and Iveco CC150 units.

== Trivia ==
- It is said that CEM Trans. Services Inc., like the provincial bus company Partas, uses the Road Runner logo to mean the fastest city bus company among other bus companies in the Philippines, servicing along EDSA corridor. The bus speed limit for Metro Manila roads is 80 km/h.

== Routes ==
- PITX - Monumento via EDSA Busway
- Ayala - Alabang via South Luzon Expressway (Route 10)
- SJDM (Starmall) - NAIA via Quezon Avenue (Route 49)

== See also ==
- Joanna Jesh Transport
- List of bus companies of the Philippines
