= Volvo B7RLE =

Low-entry single-deck bus chassis

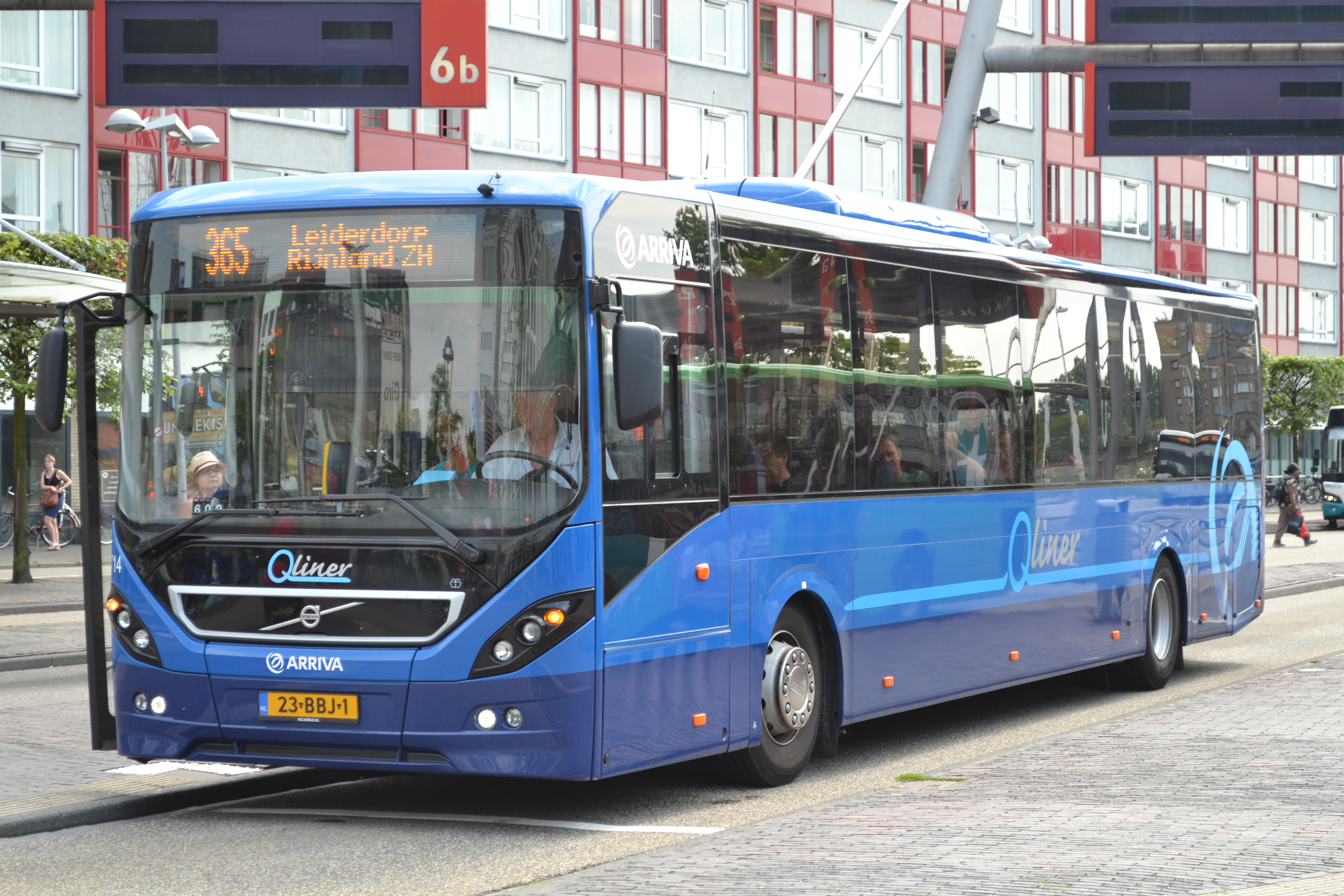
- Arriva Netherlands Volvo 8900LE bodied Volvo B7RLE in Leiden

Overview
- Manufacturer: Volvo
- Production: 2001-2018
- Assembly: Borås, Sweden

Body and chassis
- Doors: 1-3
- Floor type: Low entry
- Related: Volvo B7R

Powertrain
- Engine: Volvo D7C/D7E
- Capacity: 31 to 50 seated
- Power output: 215hp, 250hp, 275hp, 290hp
- Transmission: Voith DIWA 864.3E/D864.5; Volvo I-Shift; ZF Ecomat 6HP552N/6HP554N; ZF Ecolife 6AP1400B

Dimensions
- Length: various from 10–12 m (32 ft 10 in – 39 ft 4 in)
- Width: 2.5 m (8 ft 2 in)
- Height: 3 m (9 ft 10 in)

Chronology
- Predecessor: Volvo B10BLE; Volvo B7L
- Successor: Volvo B8RLE

The Volvo B7RLE is a low-entry single-deck bus chassis manufactured by Volvo. It was superseded by the Volvo B8RLE in 2013, with production of the B7RLE continuing until 2018.

== Specifications ==
The Volvo B7RLE is similar to its predecessor, the B10BLE. In essence, the B7RLE is the front section of the B7L chassis mated with the rear section of the B7R chassis. Originally, the B7RLE featured the D7C 6-cylinder, 7.3-litre diesel engine with a turbocharger and intercooler, producing 250 or 275 bhp and meeting the Euro III emission standard. This was replaced by the 7.1-litre Volvo D7E engine producing 290 bhp, to Euro III/IV/V emission standards.

Unlike the B7L, the B7RLE's engine is mounted at the center of the rear overhang as opposed to the nearside, resolving the issue of engine intrusion into the saloon. The Volvo B7RLE is also equipped with disc brakes and an anti-lock braking system.

== Operators ==
The Volvo B7RLE was launched in mainland Europe and Australia in 2001, and then in the United Kingdom in 2003 to supplement the B7L, which was unsuccessful in both countries.

=== United Kingdom and Ireland ===
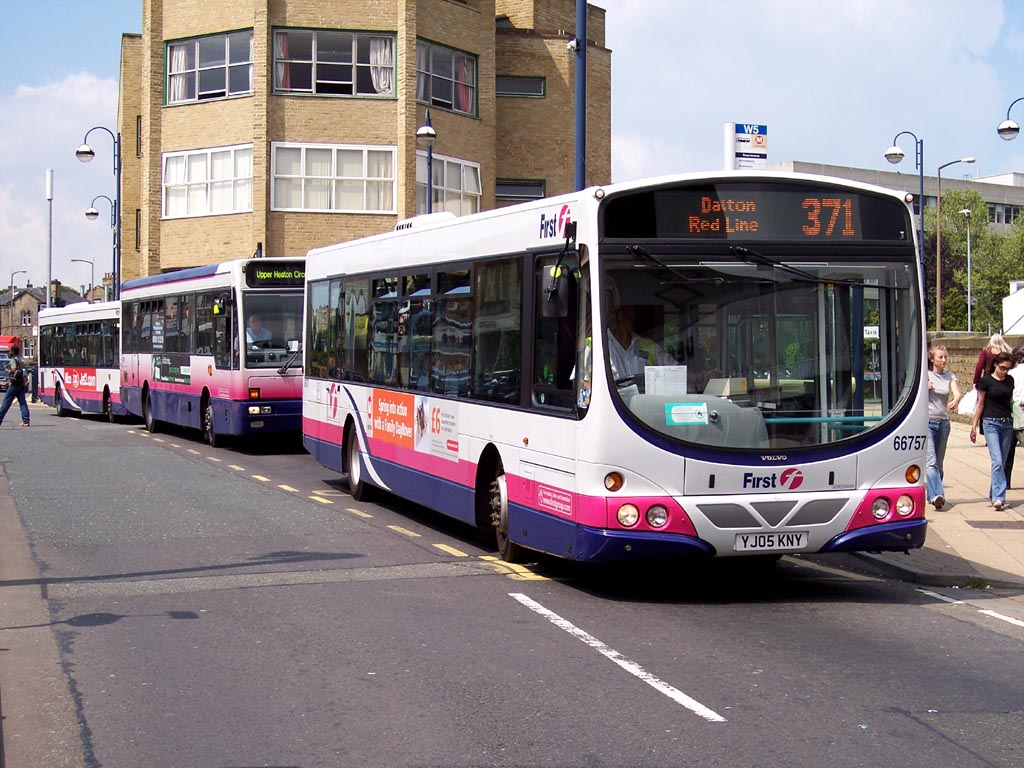
First West Yorkshire Wright Eclipse Urban bodied Volvo B7RLE in Huddersfield, England

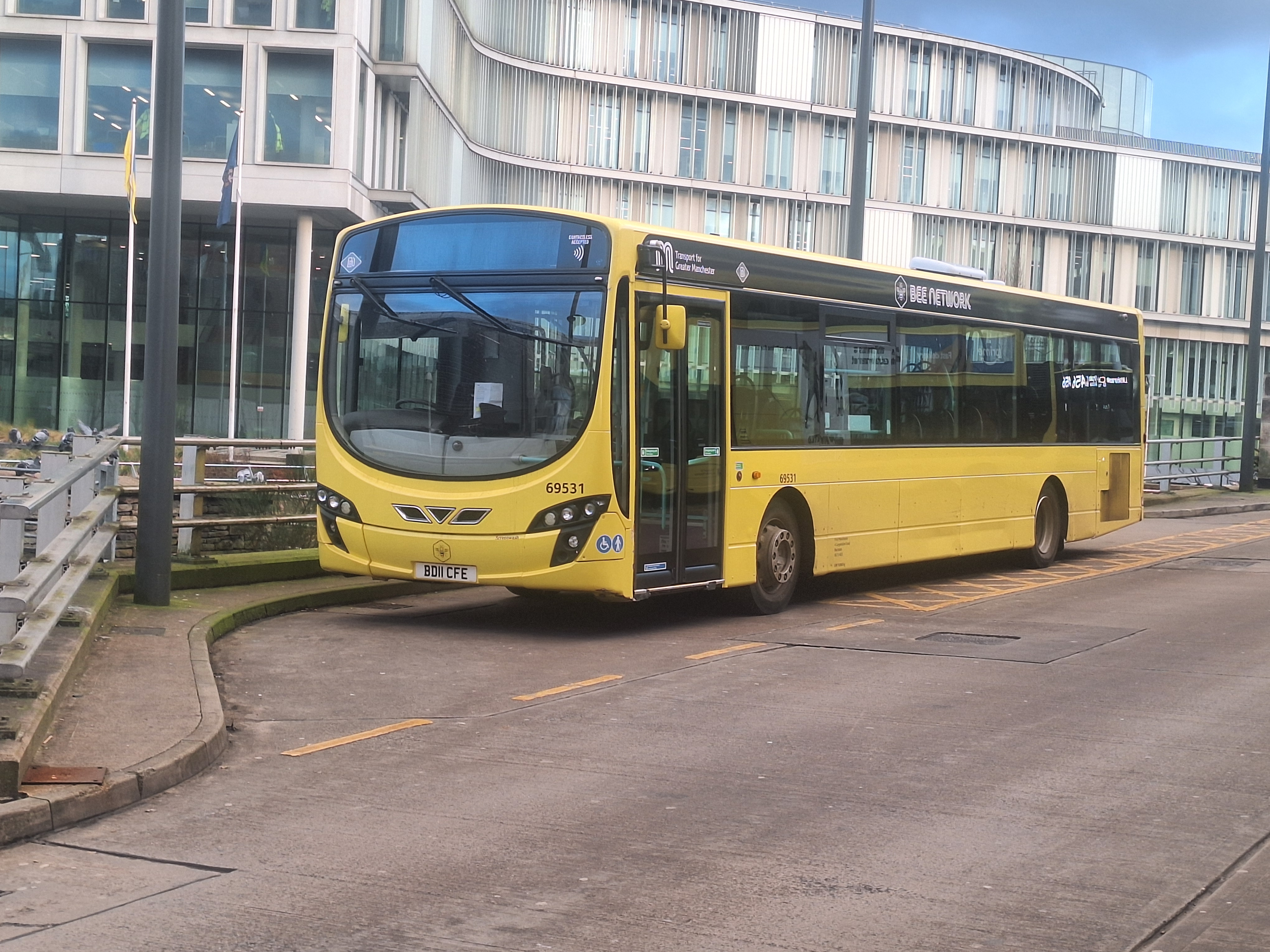
Bee Network branded First Manchester Wright Eclipse Urban 2 bodied Volvo B7RLE at Rochdale Interchange in February 2025

The B7RLE appealed most to operators in both United Kingdom and Ireland, with whom the B7L proved unpopular due to its longitudinal rear engine arrangement. Initially the B7RLE was only available in both markets with Wright Eclipse Urban bodywork, however from 2004, the B7RLE was also offered by Wrightbus as a low-floor single-decker coach, featuring a longer front overhang and a Wright Eclipse Commuter body. From late 2006, the B7RLE in the UK was available with Plaxton Centro bodywork, followed by Alexander Dennis Enviro300 and Optare Esteem bodywork in 2008.

Wright Eclipse Urbans on Volvo B7RLE chassis were the FirstGroup's standard low-floor single-deck bus from the chassis' introduction until 2013, with a total of 820 of the type delivered to the group's subsidiaries in the United Kingdom, most to First Manchester and First Glasgow, with both Urban and Urban 2 bodies.

Other operators of B7RLEs in the UK and Ireland include Arriva (134), Blazefield Group (88), Bus Éireann (73), East Yorkshire Motor Services (27), Lothian Buses (90), National Express West Midlands (188), Metro (Belfast) (29), Ulsterbus (45), Wellglade Group (51) and Wilts & Dorset (78).

=== Australia ===
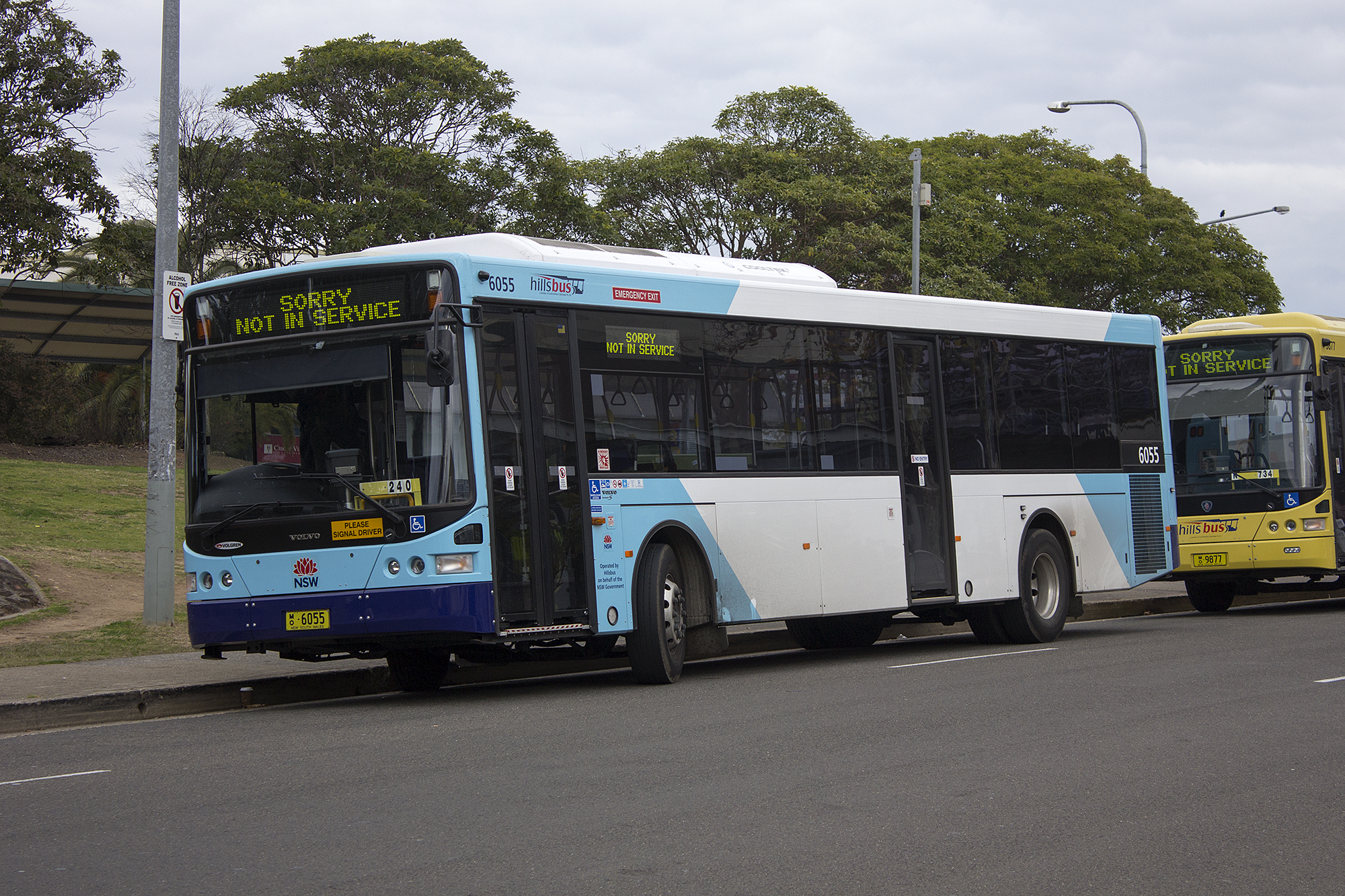
State Transit Authority Volgren CR228L bodied Volvo B7RLE operated by Hillsbus

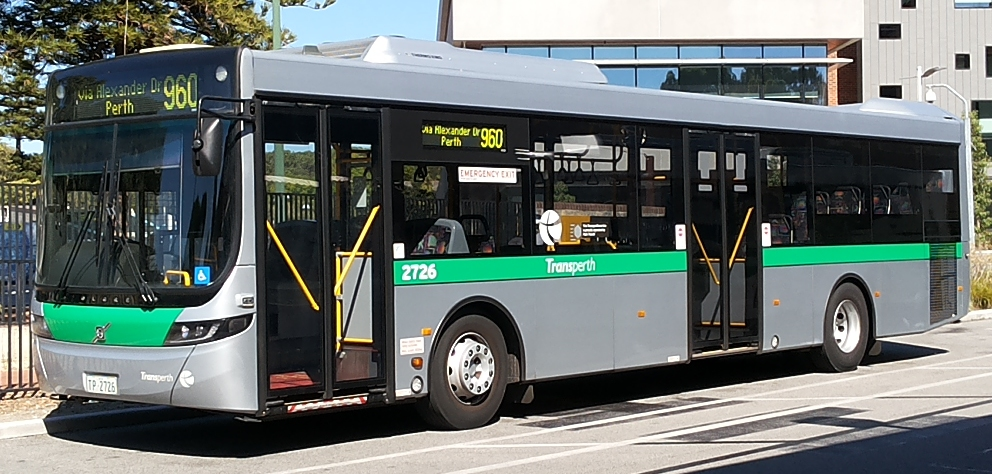
Transperth Volgren Optimus bodied Volvo B7RLE

Transperth is the largest operator of Volvo B7RLEs in Australia, taking delivery of 767 Volgren-bodied B7RLEs from 2011 onwards as part of a contract with the Public Transport Authority of the state of Western Australia. The first batches of these buses were delivered with Volgren CR228L bodies, with later models receiving new Volgren's Optimus body, both being locally assembled in the Perth suburb of Malaga.

Transport for Brisbane took delivery of a total of 554 Volgren-bodied Volvo B7RLEs with Volgren bodywork from 2009 onwards as part of a 12-year contract between Brisbane City Council, Volvo Buses and Volgren, with the final assembly of these buses taking place at a facility in Eagle Farm as part of the contract. In 2011, Brisbane City Council won Lung Foundation Australia's Green Leaf Award as a result of introducing Volvo B7RLEs into Greater Brisbane's bus fleet.

The State Transit Authority of New South Wales, which formerly operated bus services in Newcastle and Sydney, took delivery of 123 Volvo B7RLEs from 2011 onwards, built predominantly with Custom Bus and Volgren bodies, although 20 B7RLEs were delivered with Bustech bodies between 2014 and 2015.

Elsewhere, 400 B7RLEs were purchased by ComfortDelGro Australia. During 2018, 62 B7RLEs with Volgren Optimus bodies were delivered CDC NSW, initially for use on long-term rail replacement services related to the Sydney Metro Northwest rapid transit project from October 2018 onwards.

=== Belgium ===
Flemish government-owned De Lijn and its subcontractors took delivery of Volvo B7RLEs with Jonckheere Transit 2000 bodies between 2005 and 2010. The Opérateur de transport de Wallonie took delivery of 125 B7RLEs with Jonckheere Transit bodies, purchased through VDL Bus & Coach, between 2008 and 2010 for use by TEC Namur-Luxembourg and TEC Liège-Verviers, two of the five Transport en Commun companies in Wallonia.

=== Mainland China ===
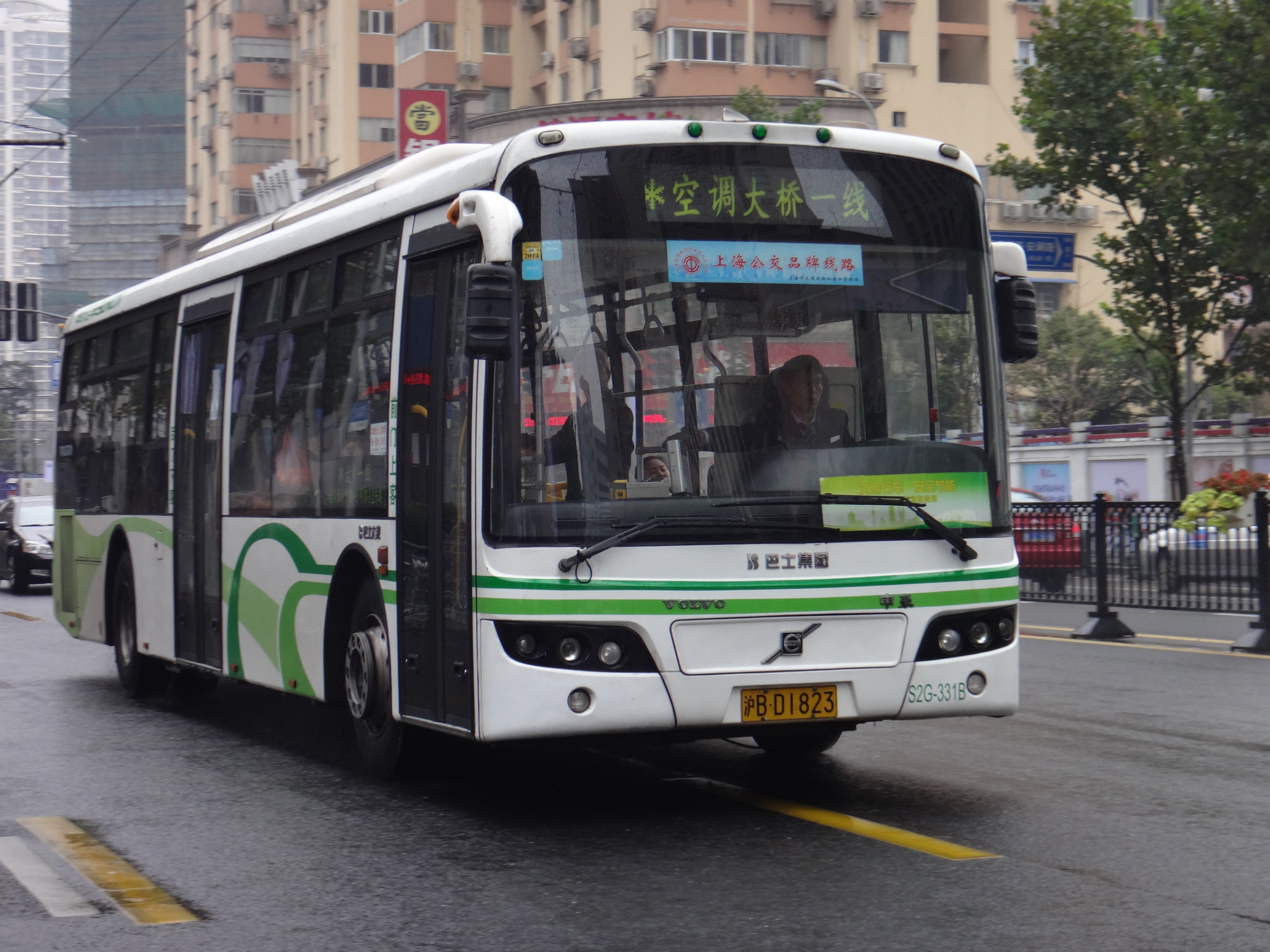
B7RLE in Shanghai, China

The B7RLE is one of the very few foreign bus chassis models in mainland China, assembled by Shanghai Sunwin Bus, assigned Chinese assembly model numbers SWB6125, SWB6120V4LE, and SWB6120V6LE. Units operated in Shanghai are SWB6120V4LE, with fleet number prefix S2F/S2G (Shanghai Public Transport) & S2B (Pudong Bus) (Euro III); S2D, with fleet number prefix S2D (written off) and SWB6120V6LE, with fleet number prefix S2M (Shanghai Public Transport)(Euro IV w/ adblue). One SWB6120V6LE unit was sent to Nanjing Public Transport as a gift, but never entered service due to a series of reasons. The B7RLE was seen very commonly on Shanghai streets.

The entire fleet of B7RLEs in mainland china are equipped with Volvo D7B260/D7E290EC01/D7E290EC06 engines paired with 6-speed automatic ZF Ecomat 6HP554N gearbox.

=== Hong Kong ===
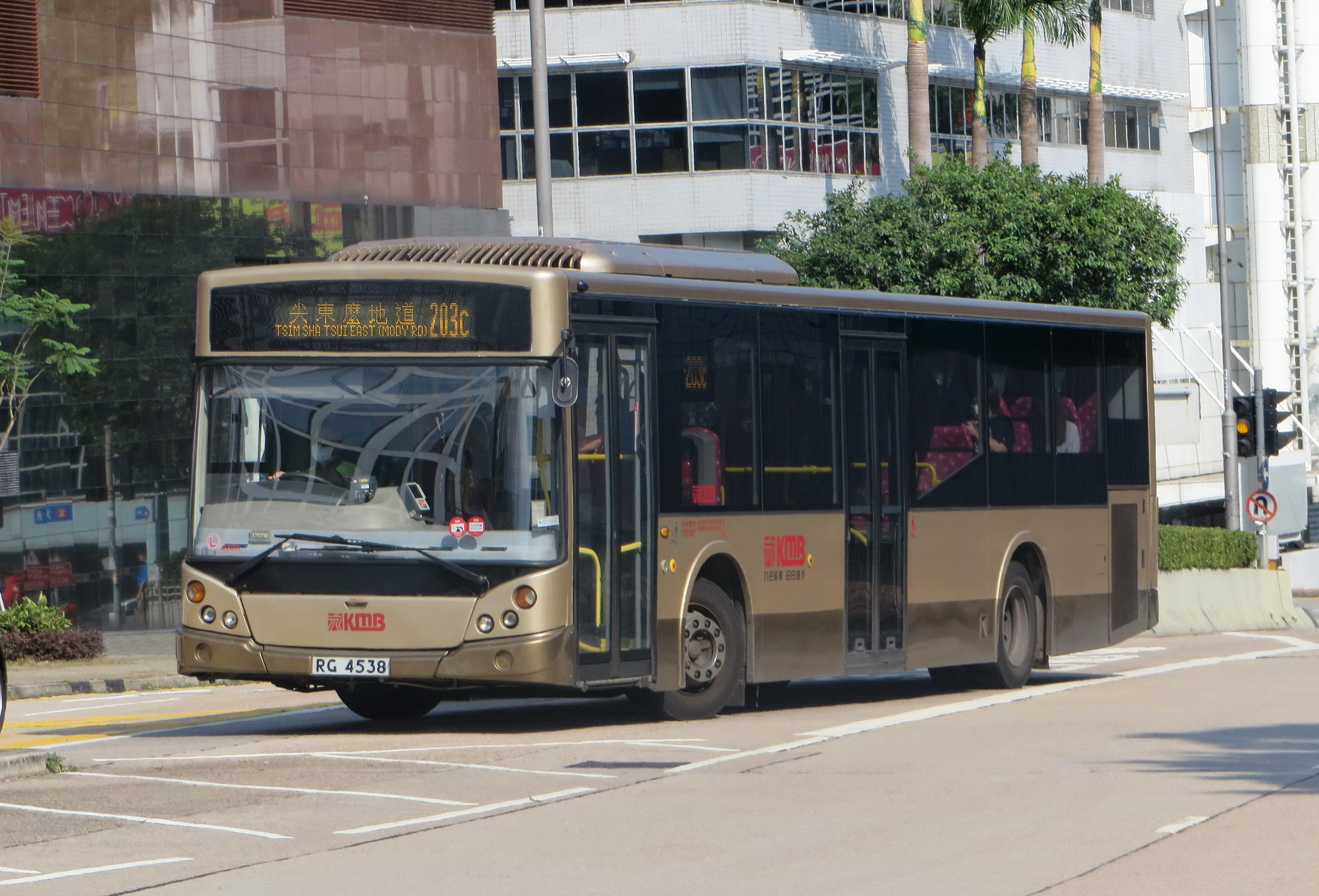
An MCV Evolution bodied Volvo B7RLE in Hong Kong

In 2003, Huangbus (Lok Ma Chau - Huanggang shuttle bus service) purchased five B7RLEs with Jit Luen JL-08 bodies and D7E-290 7142cc engines. Kowloon Motor Bus took delivery of 70 B7RLEs with MCV Evolution bodies between 2010 and 2012.

=== India ===
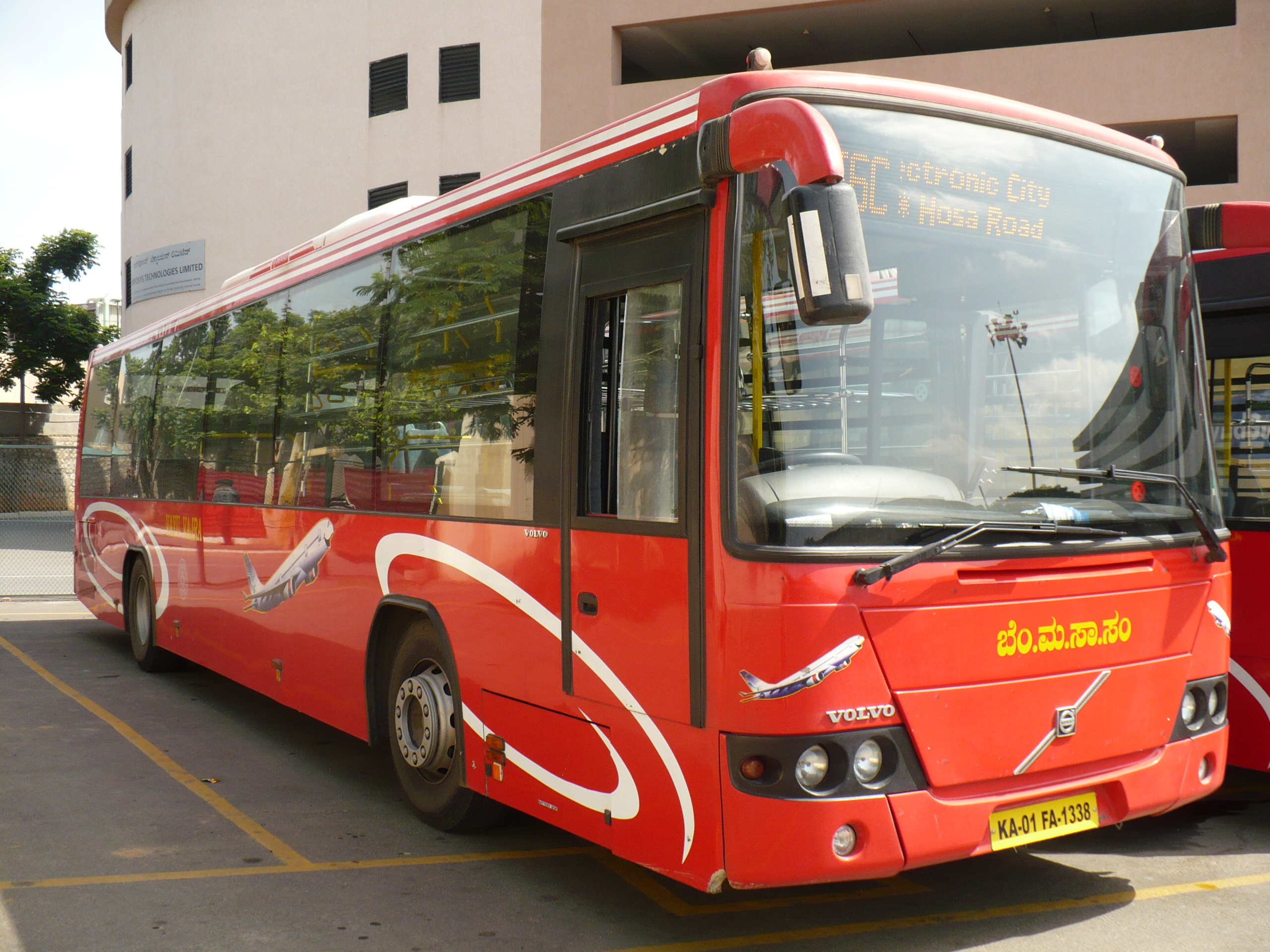
Bangalore Metropolitan Transport Corporation Volvo B7RLE in July 2008

In India, 25 Volvo B7RLEs with integrally-built 8700 bodies entered service with the Bangalore Metropolitan Transport Corporation in 2006 as India's first Volvo city buses, being locally built at Volvo's Bangalore manufacturing plant. B7RLEs are also operated by Metropolitan Transport Corporation and Tamil Nadu State Transport Corporation in Chennai and Pondicherry, Kerala State Road Transport Corporation in Kochi and Thiruvananthapuram and in 2014 Kerala Urban Road Transport Corporation started using B7RLEs for their Town To Town services all over Kerala state.

They were later inducted into the fleets of Navi Mumbai Municipal Transport, and BEST for use in Navi Mumbai and Mumbai respectively. Custom made B7RLE chassis are assembled at Volvo's factory outside Bangalore. The dual-doored versions are operated by the WBTC in Kolkata. B7RLEs are also operated by Assam State Transport Corporation in Assam state.

=== Israel ===
Metropoline purchased Volvo B7RLEs with Merkavim Pioneer bodywork. Some bus companies own Volvo B7RLEs with USB sockets, WiFi and Real time and it is the first country to use 2009 buses with a new ZF EcoLife transmission

=== Malaysia ===
In 2006, Rapid Bus ordered 120 Deftech bodied B7RLE buses for operation on RapidKL services. This is the first Rapid Bus fleet to feature wheelchair accessible ramp, and only bus fleet to feature wheelchair accessible ramp at both front and rear doors (later front doors ramp were removed after refurbishment). Later in 2014, MRT Malaysia Corp ordered 150 Gemilang Coachworks bodied B7RLE's for operation on MRT feeder bus.

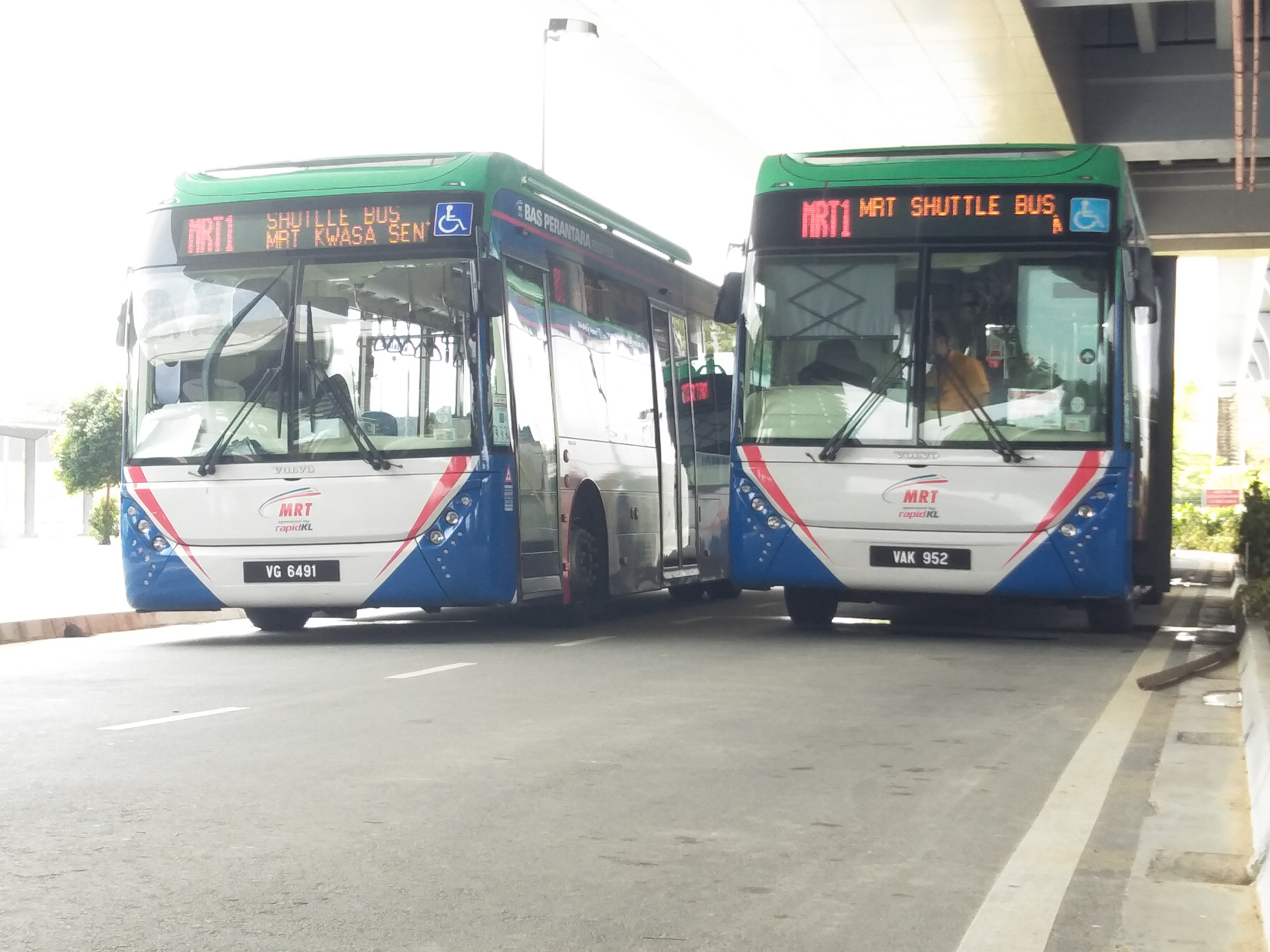
Gemilang bodied Volvo B7RLE for MRT Feeder bus

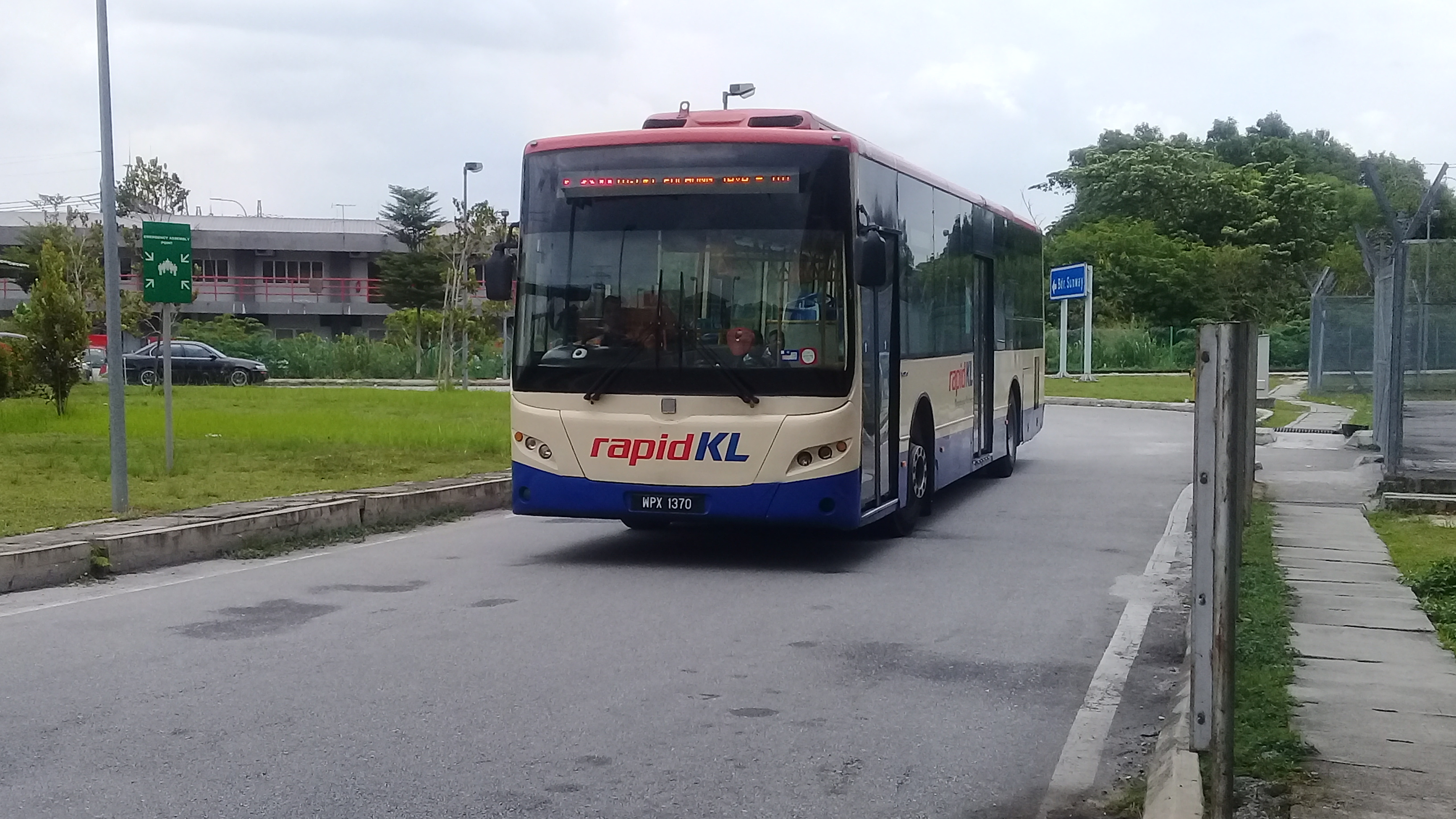
Deftech bodied Volvo B7RLE for RapidKL

=== New Zealand ===
Twenty Volvo B7RLEs with DesignLine bodies were delivered to NZ Bus, then owned by Infratil, for service in Auckland in May 2007. These have since been sold onto Ritchies Transport following the unification of operator branding and major network route overhaul in Auckland.

In 2016, Go Bus Transport ordered eighteen Volvo B7RLEs, nine with Kiwi Bus Builders bodies and nine with Gemilang bodies. The batch of nine Volvo B7RLEs with Kiwi Bus Builders bodies were wrapped in AT Orange and operated the route 380 'Airporter' between Onehunga, Mangere, Auckland Airport, Papatoetoe and Manukau. In 2017, Go Bus Transport ordered seven Volvo B7RLEs this time with Global Bus Ventures (GBV) NZ Enviroline bodies, also being wrapped in AT Orange for the route 380 'Airporter'. These buses have now been subsequently rewrapped into Auckland Transport's AT Metro colour scheme.

Mana Coach Services operate 22 Kiwi Bus Builders bodied B7RLEs equipped with a third tag axle.

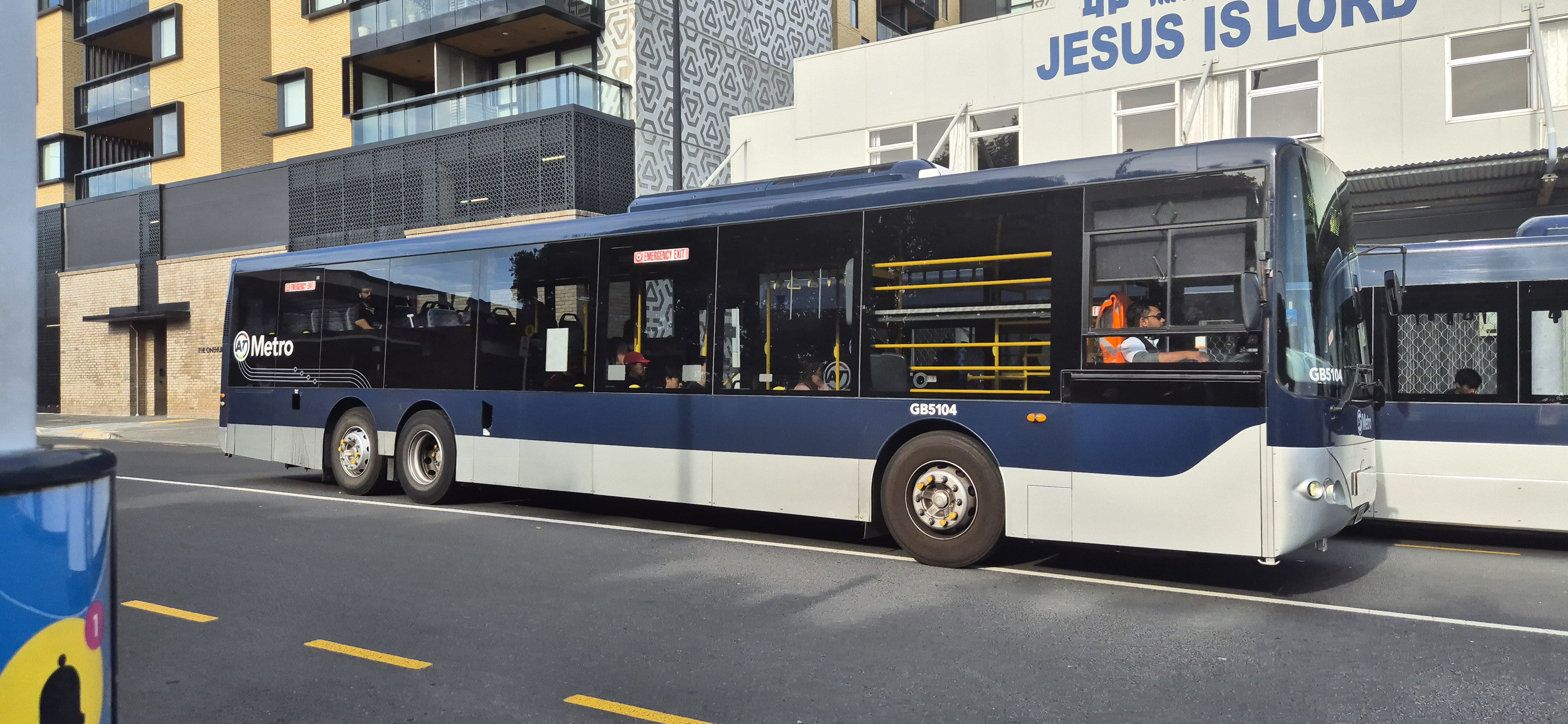
Kiwi Bus Builders bodied Volvo B7RLE for Go Bus Transport, in the AT Metro colour scheme

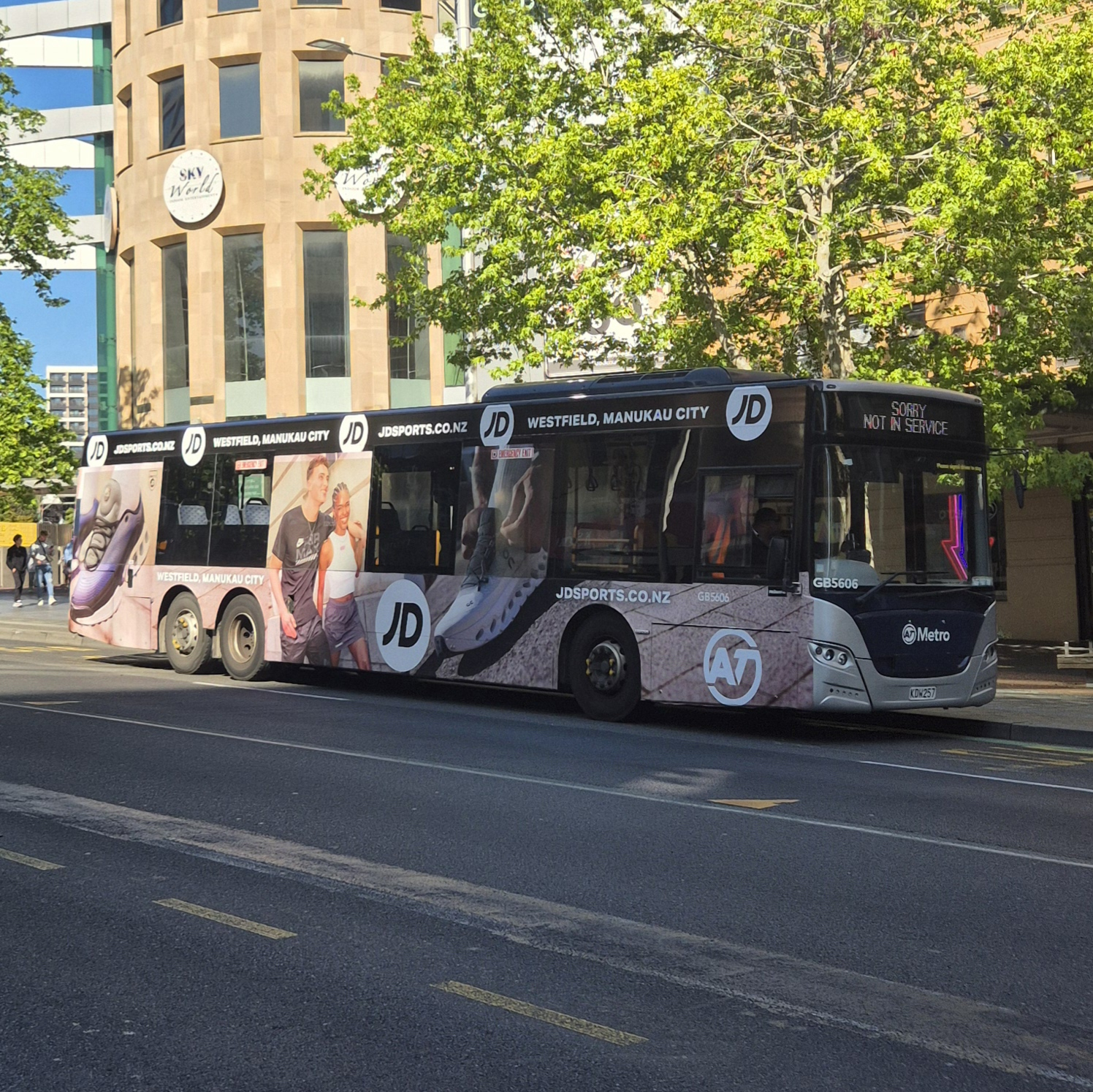
Gemilang bodied Volvo B7RLE for Go Bus Transport, in the AT Metro colour scheme

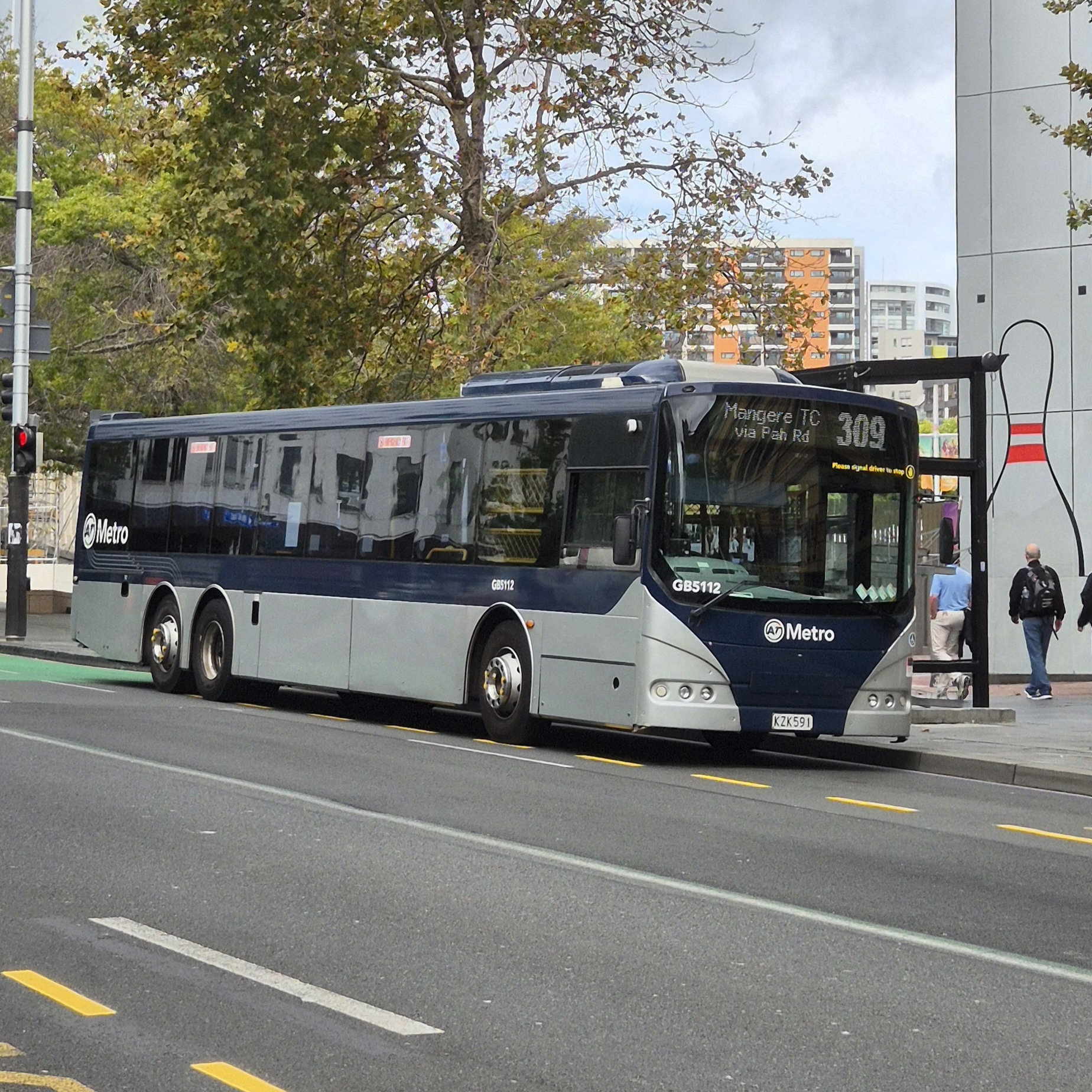
GBV NZ Enviroline bodied Volvo B7RLE for Go Bus Transport's Airporter Contract with Auckland Transport, now in the AT Metro colour scheme

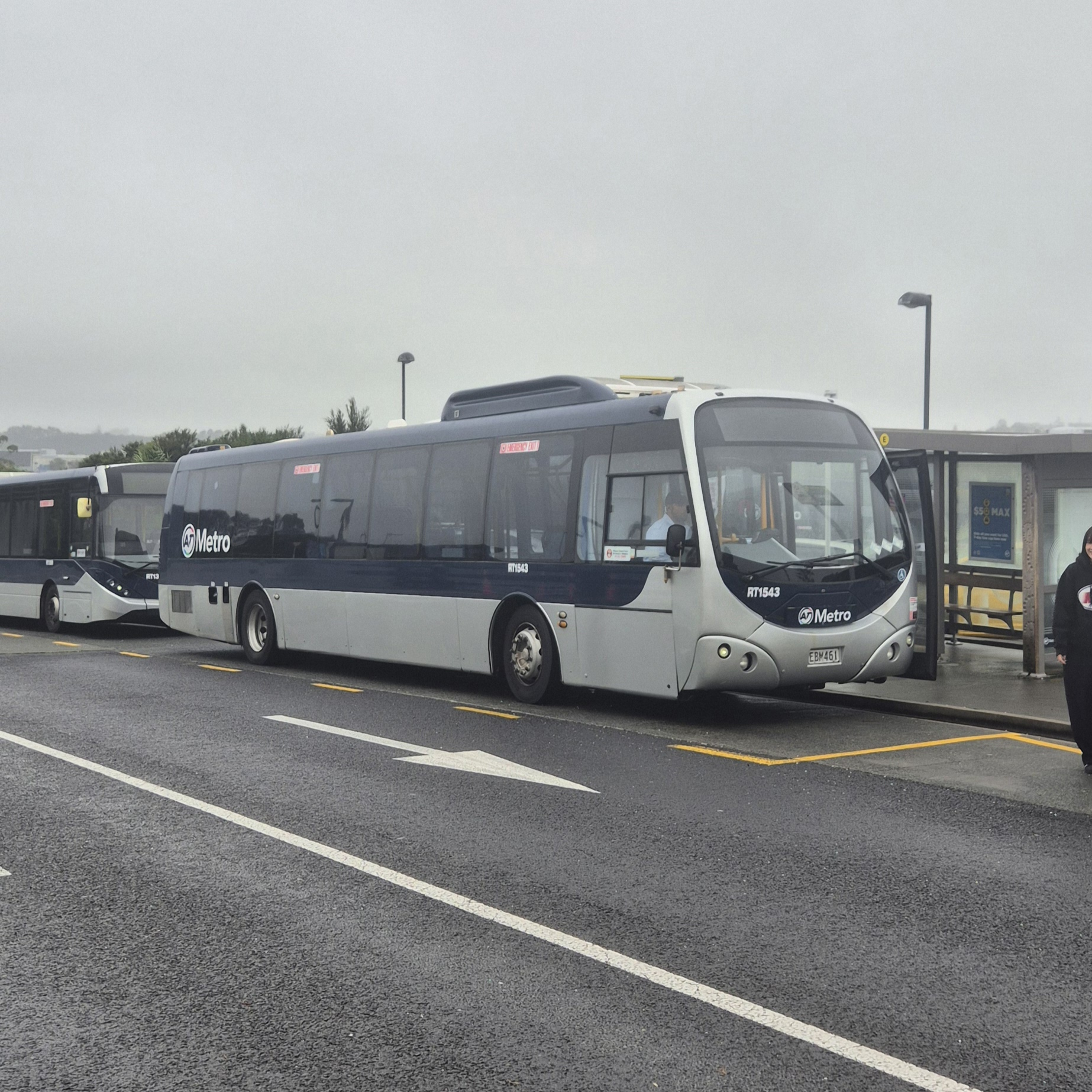
DesignLine bodied Volvo B7RLE for NZ Bus, now in the AT Metro colour scheme and owned by Ritchies Transport Holdings

=== Philippines ===
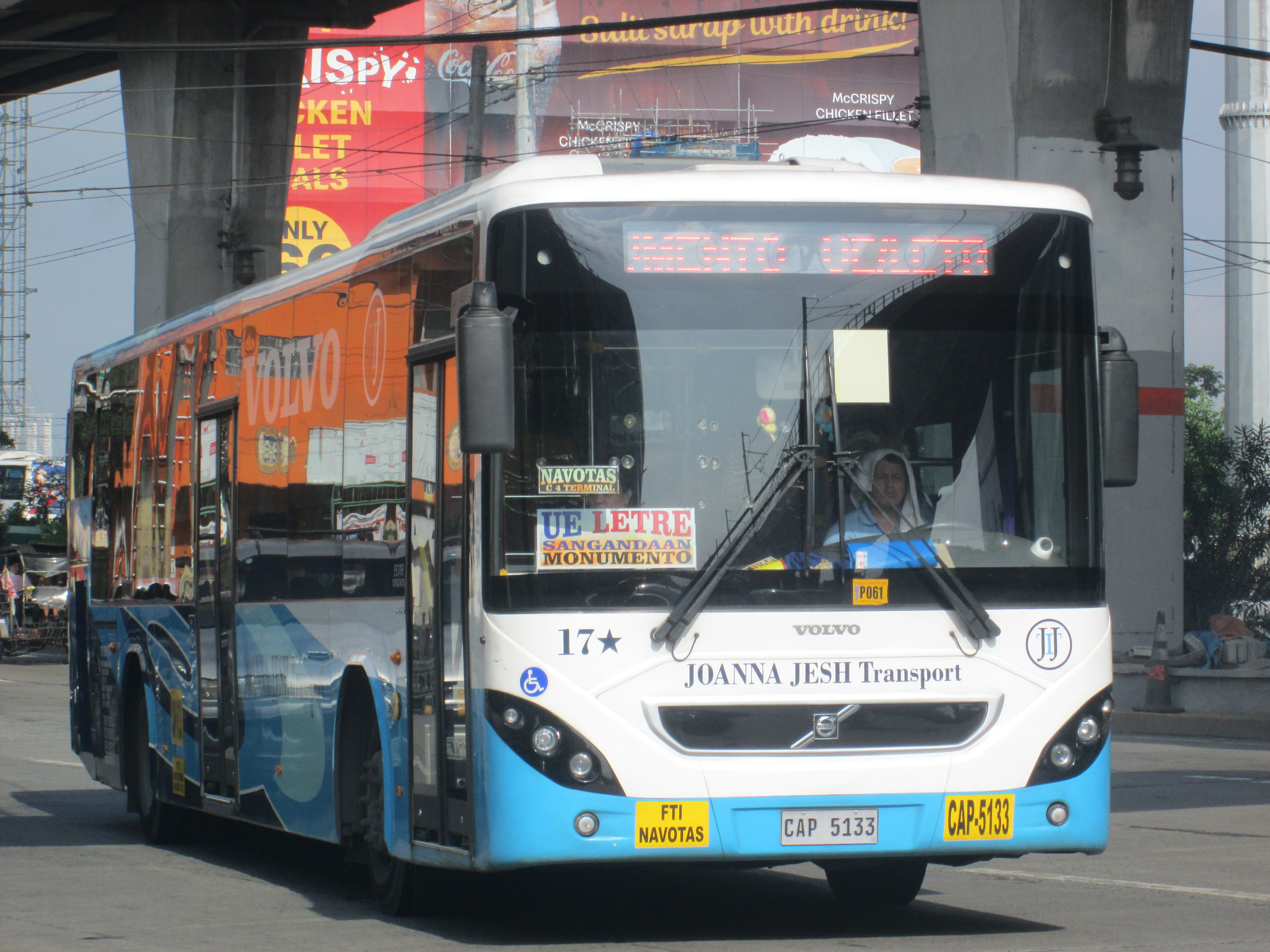
Volvo B7RLE in the Philippines, body made by Autodelta for Joanna Jesh Transport Inc.

The Philippines has B7RLEs running in Cebu City, operated by Metro Rapid Transport System Inc., the owner of MyBus. Starting July 2016, RRCG Transport launches "P2P (Point-to-Point) Premium Bus Service" for Alabang Town Center to Greenbelt 1, serving 3 units for King Long XMQ6127G with Sunwin SWB6128 front and rear mask, built by the Philippine-based Autodelta Coach Builders, Inc. This model is also used by Cebu Pacific for transporting passengers from NAIA Terminal 3 to their aircraft. The bus company Joanna Jesh Transport and CEM Trans Services Inc also started to use the bus model for its FTI-Navotas and Alabang-Malanday route respectively starting in 2019.

=== Sri Lanka ===
An air-conditioned Volvo B7RLE, nicknamed the 'luxury bus', was delivered for trial service primarily in the business districts of Colombo with the Sri Lanka Transport Board in 2011.

=== Taiwan ===
In Taiwan, B7RLEs were first introduced on Chiayi Bus Rapid Transit (Chiayi BRT) in 2007. All B7RLEs in Taiwan that were manufactured between 2007 and 2012 featured Tang Eng Iron Works bodywork, whereas those manufactured after 2013 featured Daji bodywork.

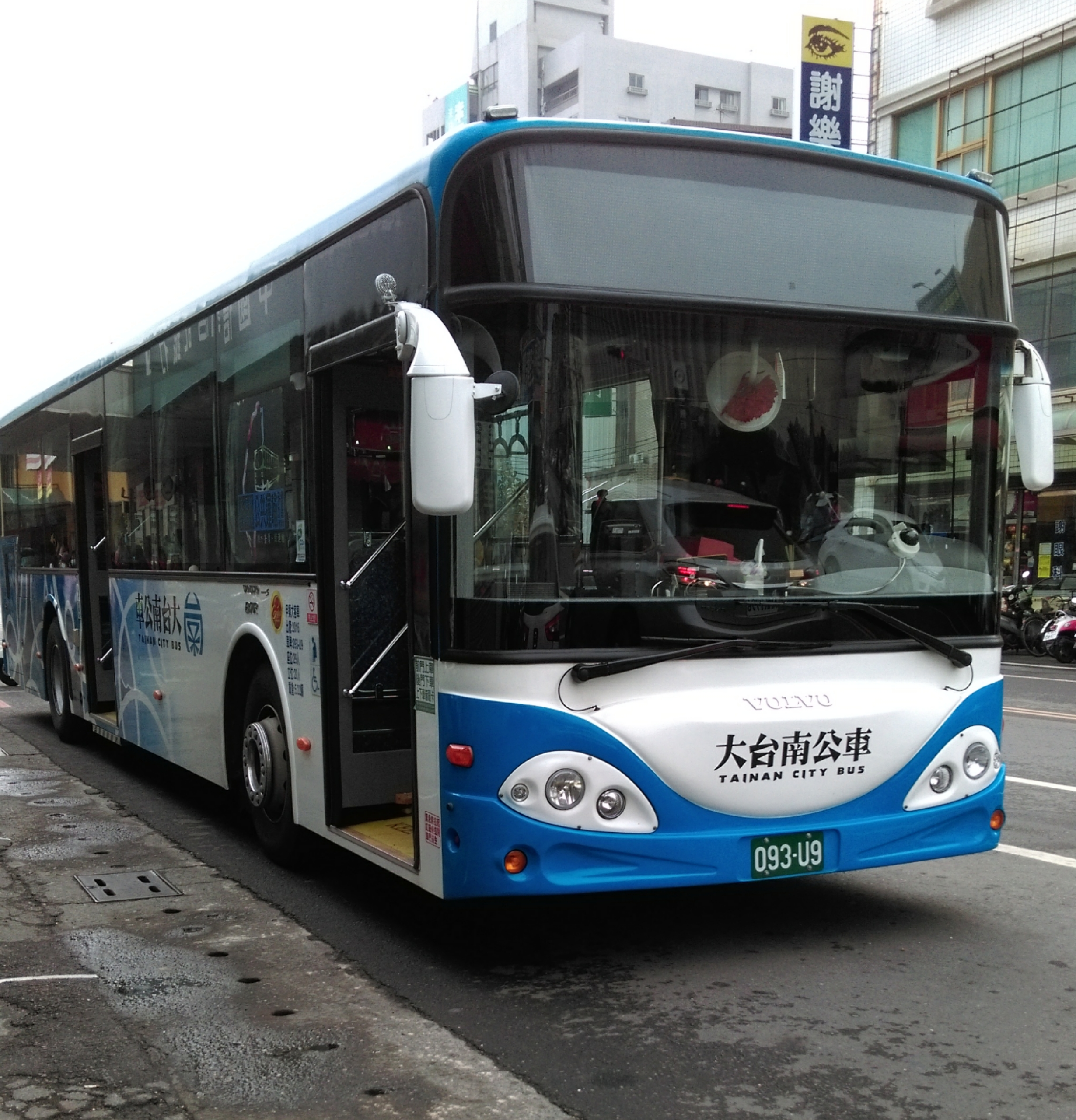
B7RLE, Taiwan
