= Johnson Jakande Tinubu Park =

Public park in Lagos, Nigeria

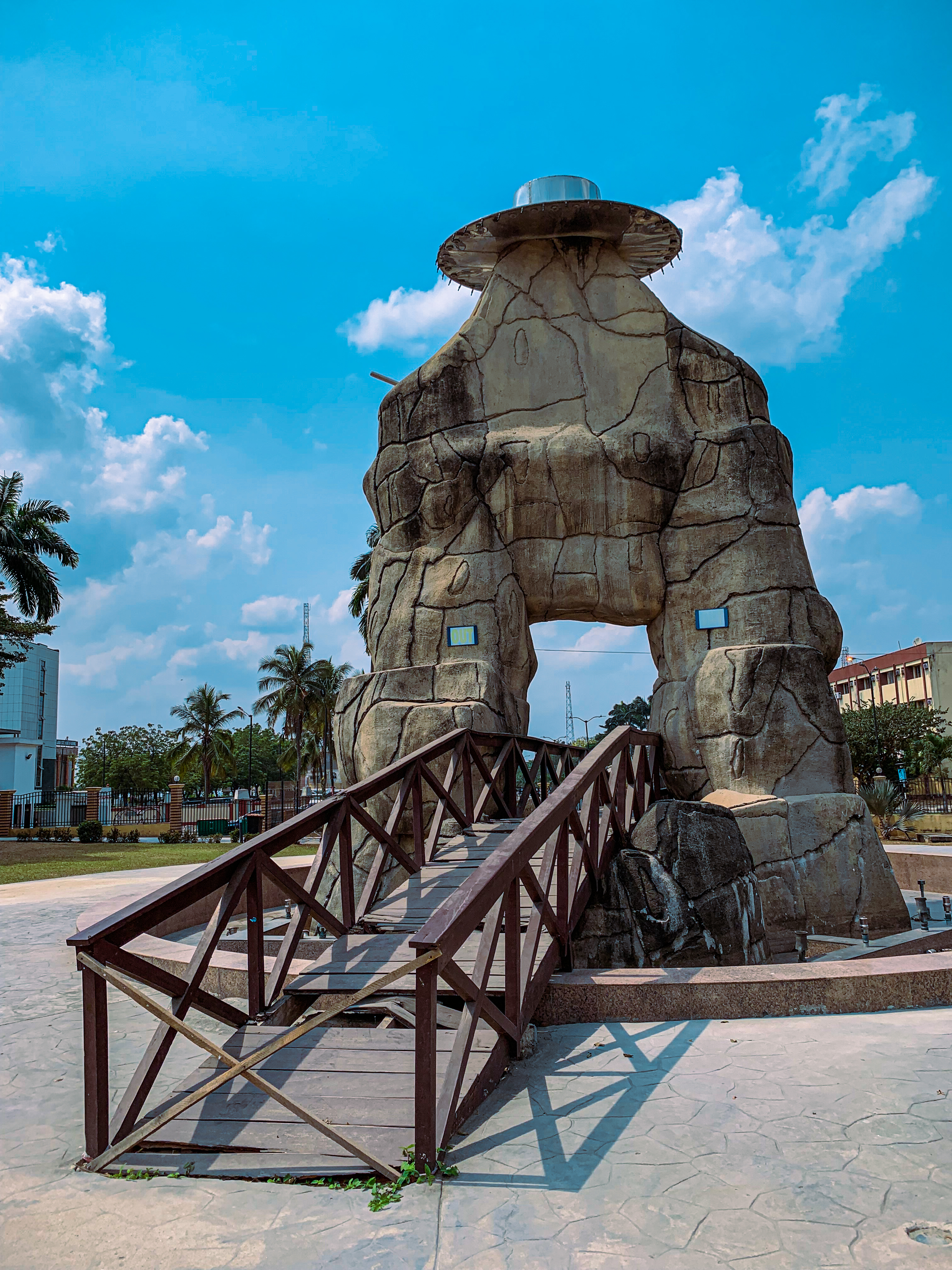
- Interactive map of Johnson Jakande Tinubu Park
- Coordinates: 6°36′55″N 3°21′50″E
- Area: 2.2 ha (0.0085 mi^{2})

The Johnson Jakande Tinubu Park is a public park located in Ikeja, the capital of Lagos. The park which was commissioned by the then Lagos State Governor, Akinwunmi Ambode in December 2017 as a recreational space located within the proximity of The Office of the Governor, the Lagos State House of Assembly and the State Secretariat.

== Gallery ==
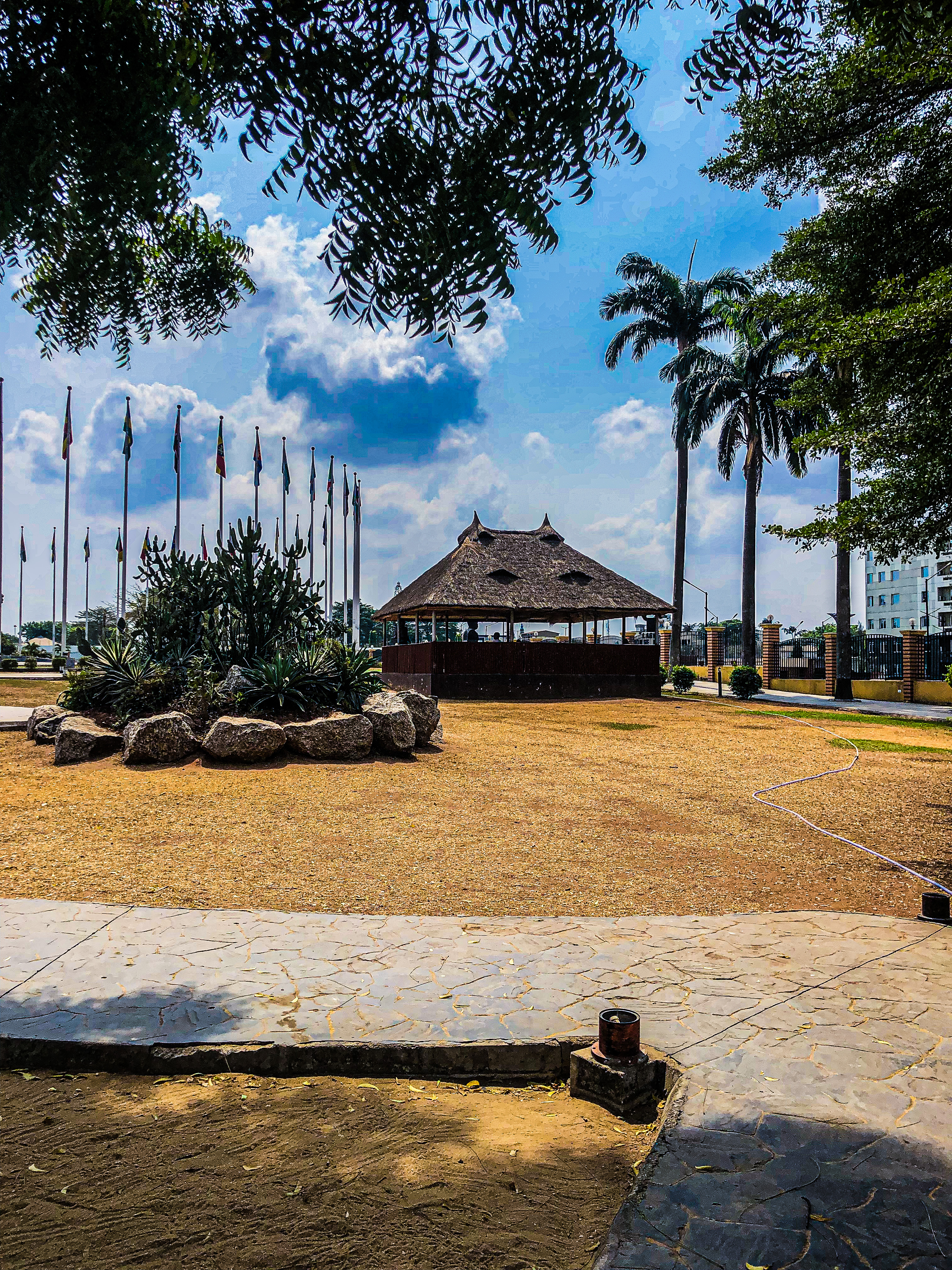

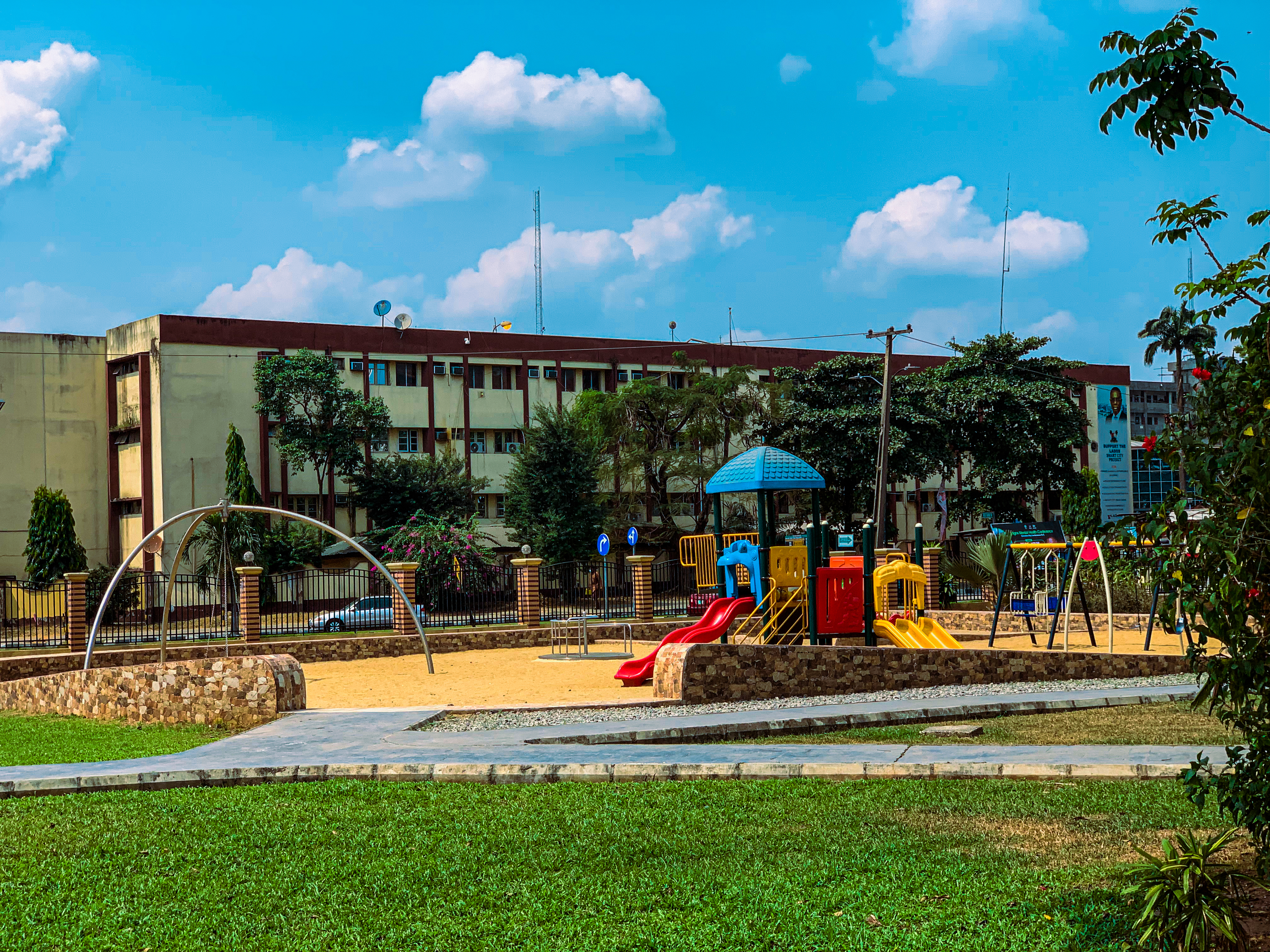

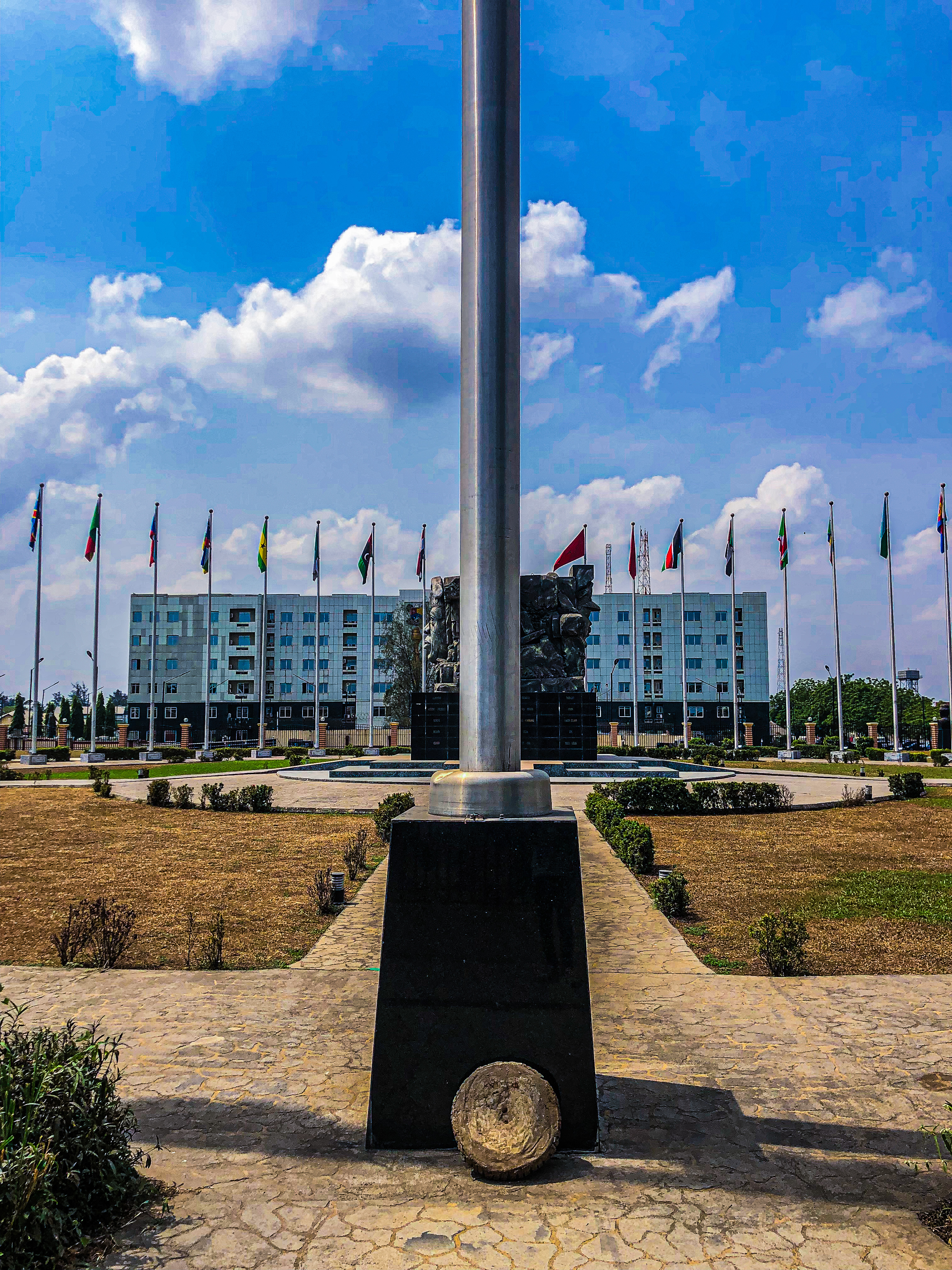
