= Joanna Jesh Transport =

City bus company in the Philippines

Joanna Jesh Transport Corp.
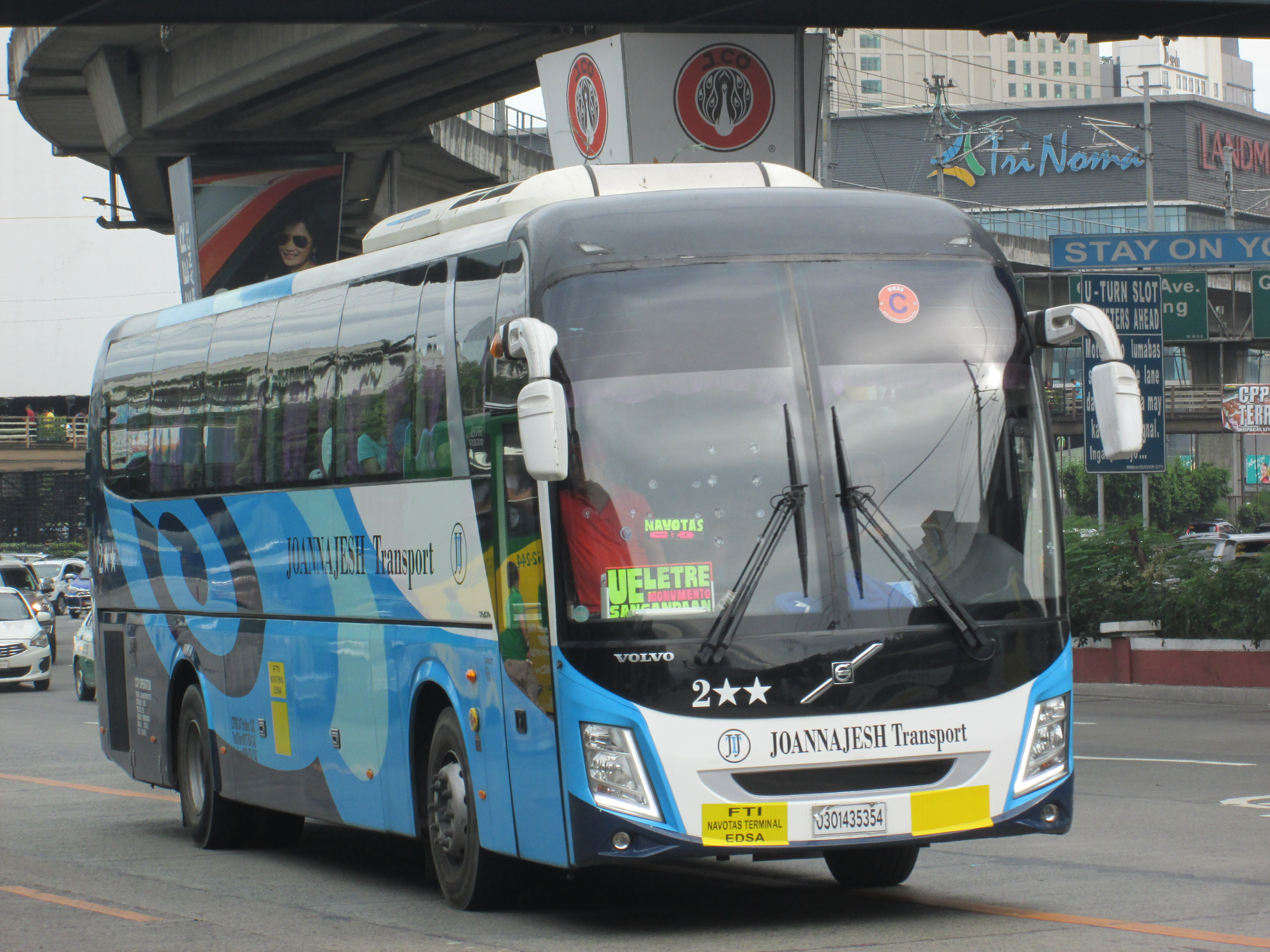
- Joanna Jesh Volvo B7r buses plying FTI - Navotas route.
- Founded: 2003
- Headquarters: Benchmark Compound, Veterans Center Industrial Complex, Western Bicutan, Taguig, Metro Manila, Philippines
- Service type: City Operation, Provincial Operation, Tourist Transport Service
- Fleet: 800+ buses (includes subsidiaries, CEM Trans Services, Yohance Express Inc., Mega Bus Lines Corp.)
- Operator: Joanna Jesh Transport Corp.

Joanna Jesh Transport Corporation (JJT) is one of the city bus companies in Metro Manila.

== Etymology ==
Joanna Jesh Transport combines the names of the founder's daughters: his eldest, Joanna Marie de Guzman Mahilac, and his younger daughter, Jessa de Guzman Mahilac. Both are the children of Crisinciano E. Mahilac, the company's sole founder and owner.

== History ==
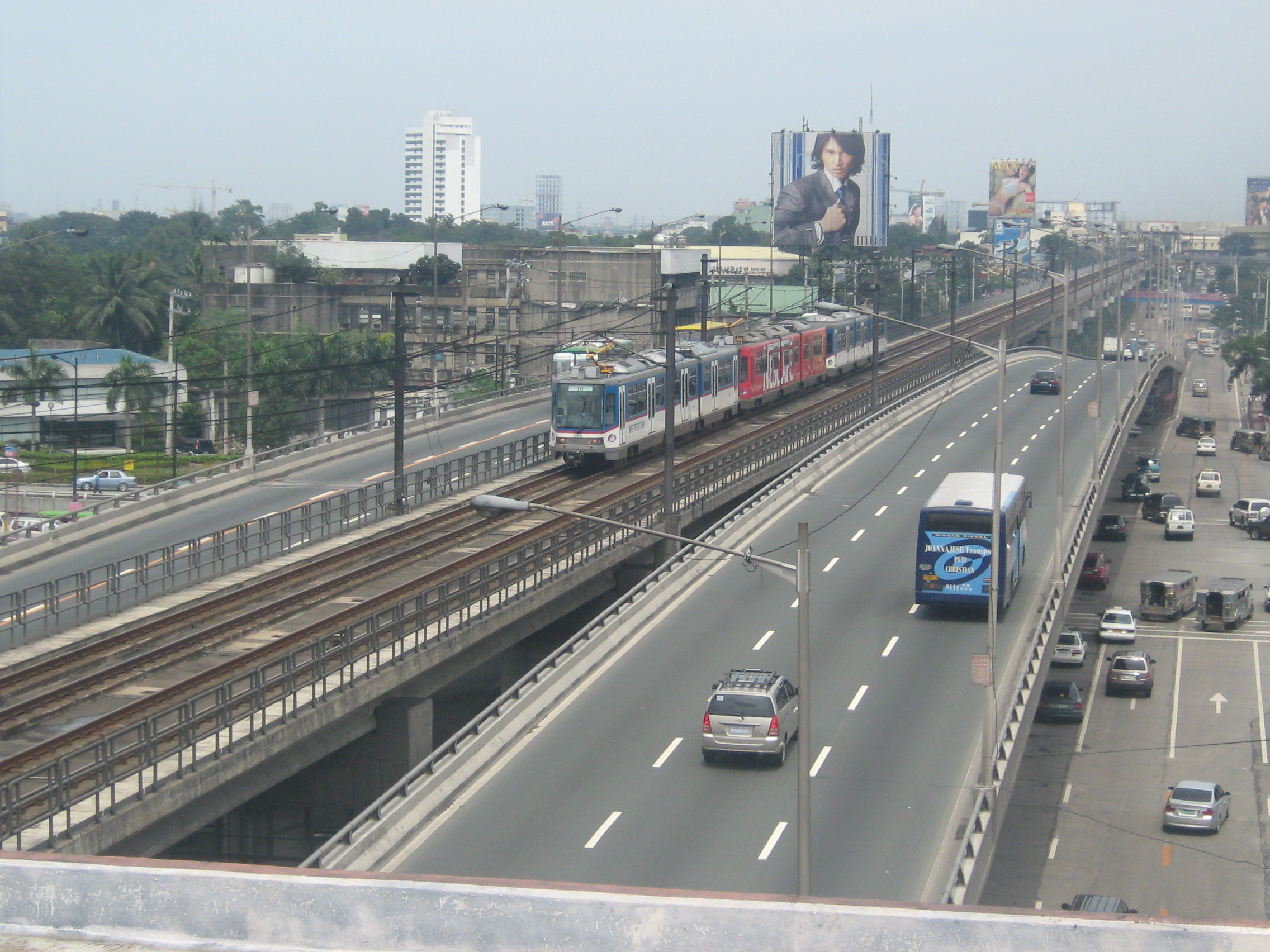
A Joanna Jesh Transport bus unit between the EDSA-Quezon Avenue Flyover.

Founded in 2003 by Crisinciano E. Mahilac, a former OFW in Saudi Arabia where the "KSA" trademark was displayed on buses, Joanna Jesh Transport began operations with 8 imported Japanese buses and 2 ordinary buses on the FTI-Navotas route. The company later transitioned to an all-ordinary fleet, purchasing two Daewoo buses, followed by 14 UD Nissan Diesel and 4 Hino buses (including one converted Japanese bus). It also acquired 10 additional UD Nissan Diesel and Hino buses for the Baclaran-Navotas route under the name Amtrak Transport Inc., though this was changed after a serious road accident.

== Issues and criticisms ==
On October 21, 2008, a fatal collision occurred at the EDSA-Santolan northbound loading bay involving Joanna Jesh Transport and Commuters Bus Corp. Two Joanna Jesh buses, one operating as Amtrak Transport, were allegedly racing when they struck a Commuters bus that had stopped to unload passengers. The impact caused the first Joanna Jesh bus to collide with a Mercedes-Benz sedan, killing Dr. Francisco Sarabia, an eye specialist, and injuring four others, including two conductors. The driver, Martinito Madrid, was arrested and charged with reckless driving resulting in homicide. He was later released on bail.

The Land Transportation Franchising and Regulatory Board (LTFRB) suspended Joanna Jesh Transport and Commuters Bus Corp. for 30 days, halting their operations. The suspension was subsequently lifted once the companies complied with regulatory directives: drivers underwent a three-day training course at the University of the Philippines' National Center for Transportation Studies and passed drug tests as a prerequisite to resuming service.

Atty. Omar Mayo, legal counsel for Joanna Jesh Transport, asserted that the company did not violate any franchise laws. He challenged the suspension and the sanction related to the alleged "use of an illegal and unauthorized business name." This position was corroborated by QCPD Traffic Sector Police Officer 2 Renato Sunga, whose investigation concluded that the Commuters Bus unit was responsible for the traffic violation. Sunga determined that the Commuters Bus driver had stopped outside the designated loading/unloading bay to discharge passengers.

On November 10, 2008, just days before its suspension was set to expire, the Land Transportation Franchising and Regulatory Board (LTFRB) lifted the preventive suspension on Joanna Jesh. This decision followed the company's petition to lift the suspension and the completion of driver retraining. However, LTFRB Executive Director Manny Mahipus stated that the company could still face administrative charges if the victims' families pursue civil or criminal litigation against it.

Despite the suspension being lifted, persistent rumors allege that some drivers continue to take over routes to secure their daily wages.

On May 3, 2015, an AJ Sampaguita Bus Liner, a sister company, was reported for reckless driving on the elevated Skyway. The bus was traveling at over 120 km/h, significantly exceeding the 80 km/h speed limit for large vehicles, while swerving between lanes and recklessly overtaking cars. When a motorist signaled the driver to slow down, the driver misinterpreted this as aggression, subsequently cutting off the vehicle and threatening a collision. The driver was later observed laughing while operating the bus, which was carrying passengers at the time.

On February 1, 2016, a Joanna Jesh bus driven by Roel Labin, while racing another bus on the EDSA-Ayala southbound lane, swerved left and collided with MMDA barriers. The incident was captured on a dashboard camera.

In connection with the anti-illegal drug campaign, Crisinciano Enot Mahilac, the incumbent mayor of Sinacaban, Misamis Occidental, was named in a list of politicians allegedly involved in the drug trade. He was strongly linked to the Parohinog clan, a family suspected of drug trafficking in the province. President Rodrigo Duterte issued a warning to both political clans regarding their alleged involvement in the illegal drug trade. As a three-term mayor, Mahilac faces potential sanctions if he continues these activities.

== Recent updates ==
To address the bus shortage to the FTI Complex, the company acquired 10 new UD Nissan Diesel units with a red violet livery. However, this solution was only a temporary fix, as the shortage was exacerbated by the permanent closure of former operators like PVP Liner and King of Kings Transport (owned by Claire dela Fuente).

Joanna Jesh Transport established a new bus company featuring Nissan Diesel Santarosa Euro (Metrorider) units, which was subsequently renamed Yohance Express Inc. in honor of Cian Yohan Mahilac, the youngest son of founder Crisinciano Mahilac. Additionally, the company introduced UD Trucks Santarosa PKB units for Sampaguita Auto Transport Corp. and RBM Grand Rally Transport Inc. (both subsidiaries of Yohance Express) servicing new routes to Novaliches and NAIA-Grotto.

== Fleet ==
Joanna Jesh Transport utilizes and maintains roughly a total of over 230 buses. Some of these are :

- Nissan Diesel
- Hino
- Volvo B7R
- Volvo B7RLE
- Daewoo BS106
- Iveco CC150
- Daewoo BF106 PKB

== Routes ==
- F.T.I - Ayala Center via Ayala (Route 16)
- PITX - Monumento via EDSA Busway (Route 1)

== Subsidiaries ==
=== CEM Trans Services Inc. ===
- SJDM (Starmall) - NAIA via Quezon Avenue (Route 49)
- PITX - Monumento via EDSA Busway (Route E)
- Ayala Center - Alabang via South Luzon Expressway (Route 10)

=== Yohance Express Inc. ===
- Ayala Center - Alabang via South Luzon Expressway (Route 10)
- F.T.I - Ayala Center (Route 45)
- Pasay/PITX - Cagayan de Oro via SLEX, South Maharlika Highway

=== RBM Grand Rally Transport Inc. (operated by: Yohance Express Inc.) ===
- SJDM (Starmall) - NAIA via Quezon Avenue (Route 49)
