= ManaBus.com =

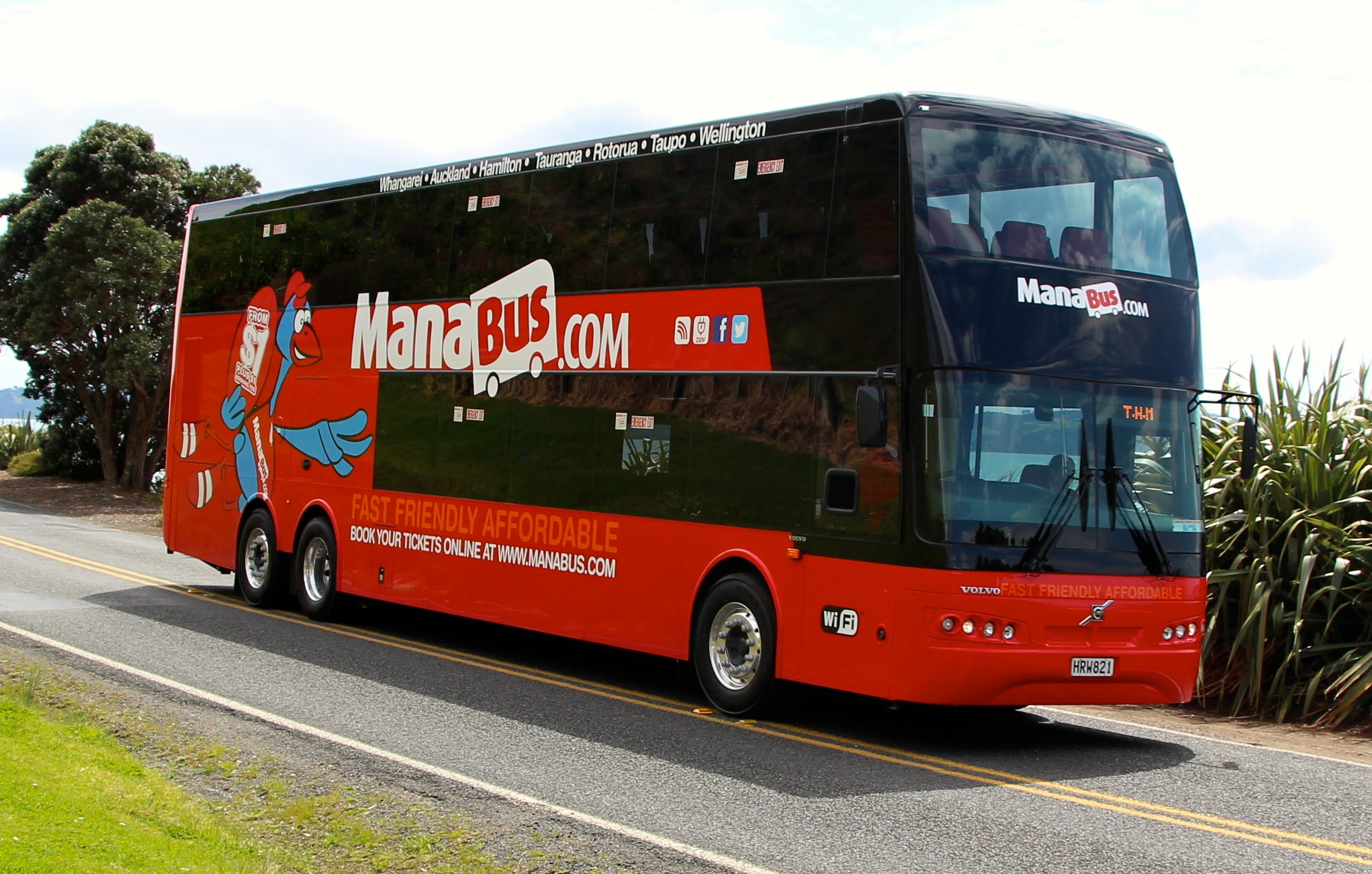
- Kiwi Bus Builders bodied Volvo B11R
- Parent: InMotion Group
- Commenced operation: 21 November 2014
- Ceased operation: 15 July 2018
- Headquarters: Auckland
- Service area: North Island
- Service type: Intercity coach services
- Website: www.manabus.com

ManaBus.com was an intercity coach service operator in New Zealand. The company was owned by Brian Souter's InMotion Group. ManaBus and Nakedbus ceased operation on 15 July 2018, with the bus fleets being sold to Ritchies Transport Holdings, part owner of rival coach company InterCity.

== History ==
ManaBus.com commenced operating express coach services on the North Island of New Zealand on 21 November 2014. In May 2015 it took over Nakedbus. On 15 July 2018 ManaBus and Nakedbus ceased operation.

== Corporate strategy ==
Advertised fares started at $1 (plus $1.99 booking fee), using a yield management model as employed by sister companies Megabus, OnniBus and PolskiBus. ManaBus.com operated at a high load factor using yield management pricing and large double decker buses to keep capital cost per seat and fuel burn per seat at low levels, similar to how airlines operate. Founder Brian Souter believed that bus journeys of up to six hours can compete with air travel.

== Services ==
ManaBus.com operated 24 hours a day, 7 days a week across the North Island of New Zealand. Key routes include:

- Auckland – Wellington (day services and a sleeper bus service)
- Auckland – Whangārei to Paihia
- Wellington – Palmerston North, Taupō, Rotorua, Hamilton to Auckland
- Auckland – Napier
- Auckland – Whitianga
- Auckland – Tauranga
- Auckland – Hamilton
- Whangārei – Hamilton
- Whangārei – Rotorua

== Fleet ==
ManaBus.com operated a fleet of Kiwi Bus Builders bodied Volvo B11Rs.
