= Brian Souter =

Scottish businessman

Sir Brian Souter
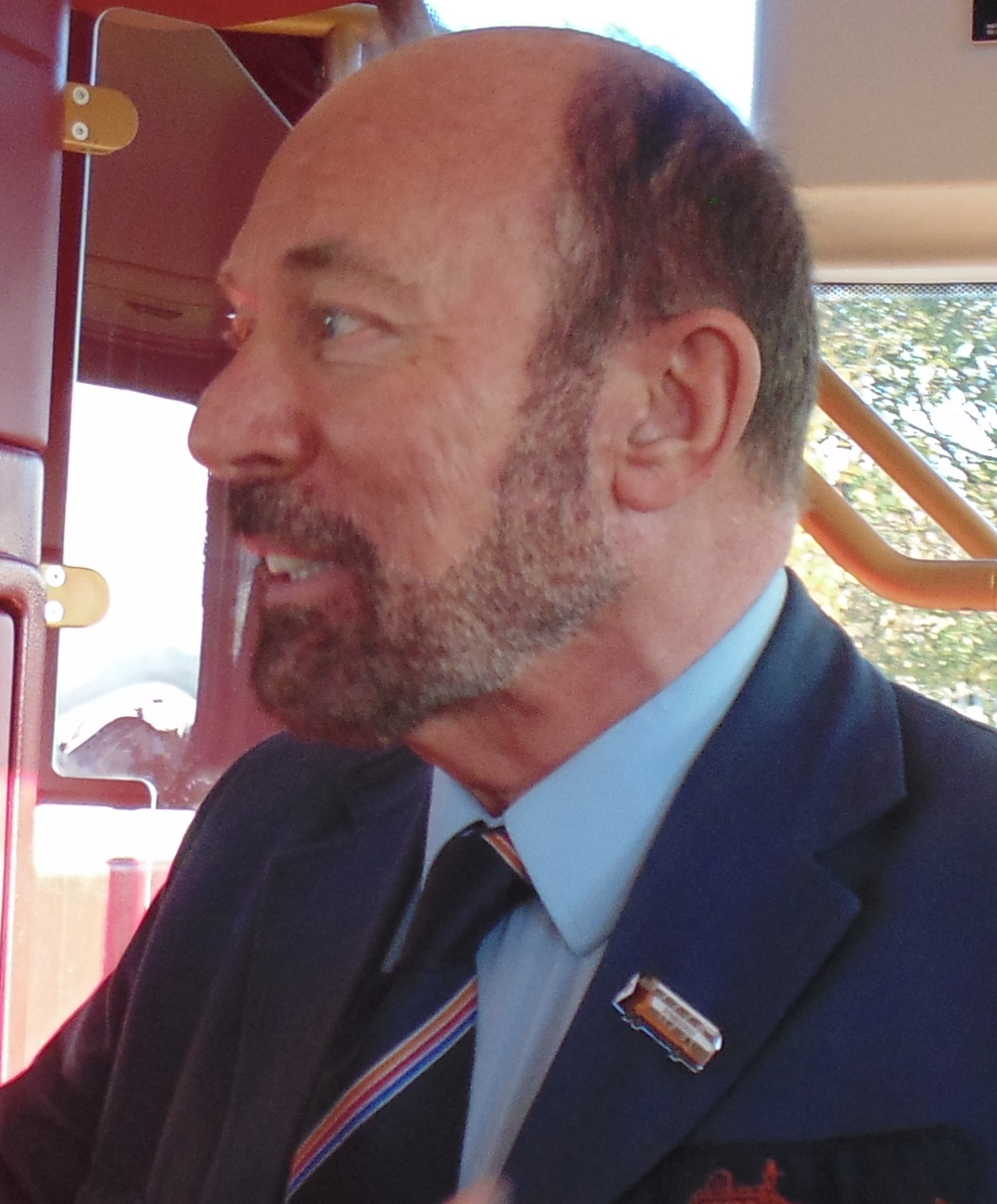
- Souter in 2014
- Born: 5 May 1954 (age 72); Perth, Scotland
- Occupation: Businessman
- Years active: 1980–present
- Title: Chairman, Stagecoach Group
- Spouse: Betty Souter
- Children: 4
- Relatives: Dame Ann Gloag (sister)
- Website: briansouter.com

Sir Brian Souter (born 5 May 1954) is a Scottish businessman. With his sister, Ann Gloag, he founded the Stagecoach Group of bus and rail operators. He also founded the bus and coach operator Megabus, the train operating company South West Trains, his investments company Souter Holdings Ltd, and the Souter Charitable Trust.

Souter has been politically active in Scotland, and supported the Scottish National Party (SNP) financially. In 2000, when the Scottish Executive proposed to repeal Section 2A of the Local Government Act, which prevented local authorities from "promoting homosexuality", Souter started the Keep the Clause campaign to oppose their plans, spending £1 million of his own money to organise a private referendum across Scotland. In 2011, he was knighted for services to transport and the voluntary sector. The honour was criticised by Scottish Labour Party politicians and by gay rights campaigners.

In October 2019, Souter announced the donation of 28% of the total shares in Souter Investments to charitable causes, with an estimated value of £109 million. This was described in The Scotsman as "what could be the largest charitable donation by a Scot since ... Andrew Carnegie". This came after Souter's charitable trust had already spent over £98 million supporting "13,000 worthwhile causes" over 13 years. According to the Sunday Times Rich List in 2020, Souter and his sister Ann Gloag are worth £730 million, a decrease of £145 million from the previous year.

== Life and career ==
=== Childhood and education ===
Souter was born in the Scottish city of Perth. His father was a bus driver and as a child Brian often travelled on bus routes with his father. At school he developed an interest in economics and accounts, about which he later said, "Changing my timetable from maths to include economics and accounts was one of the best things I've ever done."

On leaving school, he studied at the Dundee Institute of Technology (which became Abertay University in 1994) to become a commerce teacher. On completion he studied at Strathclyde University in Glasgow, where he graduated with a CA Diploma in Accountancy and Economics. Following his graduation, Souter became a Chartered Accountant at Arthur Andersen & Co.

=== Stagecoach ===
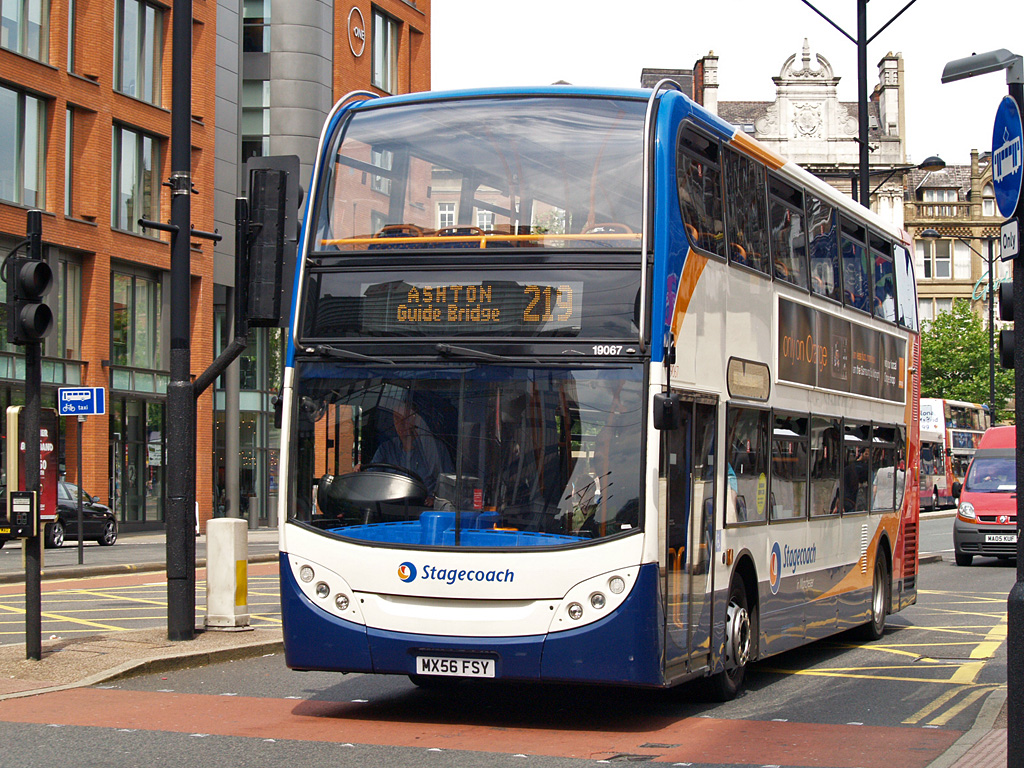
Stagecoach Manchester bus

Using his father's redundancy money, with his sister Ann Gloag and his brother-in-law Robin Gloag he established the Stagecoach Group in 1980, running buses from Dundee to London. Following the deregulation of bus services in Great Britain, expansion continued, and in the late 1980s Stagecoach acquired National Bus Company subsidiaries in Cumberland and Hampshire, and the East Midlands, Ribble, Southdown and United Counties companies. Stagecoach also bought bus operations in Scotland, Newcastle and London, with Manchester being added a few years later. In 1993, Stagecoach was valued at £134 million and was floated on the London Stock Exchange to access capital for new opportunities for buses and trains overseas.

By the mid-1990s, Stagecoach developed its interests in Australia and New Zealand. The company further expanded with the purchase of Citybus, an operator of buses and ferries in Hong Kong, and Coach USA.

Stagecoach then bought a number of the new small bus companies and ran free or low-fare buses to put local rivals out of business. In Darlington, Stagecoach subsidiary Busways offered bounties to recruit drivers from the existing bus service and offered free buses to deter the rival preferred bidder from taking over that service. This practice was deemed as "predatory, deplorable and against the public interest" according to the Monopolies and Mergers Commission.

In 2009, Souter received a £1.6 million bonus. Stating "it was felt that in the present economic climate it would not be right for any individual to pocket a bonus package of £1.6million", he donated £900,000 to his own charity, the Souter Charitable Trust, which assists humanitarian projects in the UK and overseas. Most of the remainder was given to the staff pension fund.

In August 2012, it was announced that Souter would become chairman of Stagecoach Group on 1 May 2013, finance director Martin Griffiths replacing Souter as CEO. It was announced in December 2019 that Souter would step down from his role as chairman at the end of the year, but remain on the board as a non-executive director.

=== Rail operations ===
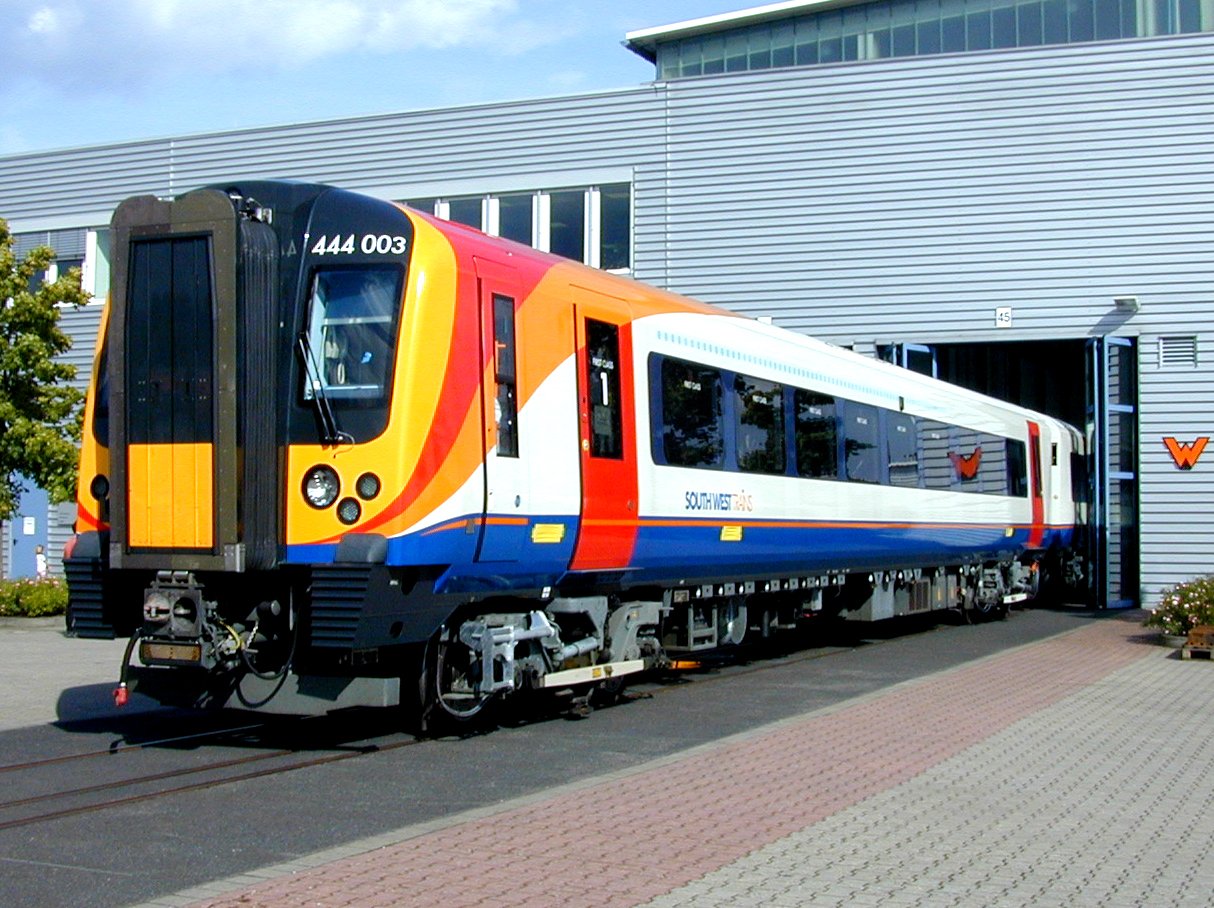
South West Trains Class 444

Shortly after Souter floated Stagecoach on the London Stock Exchange, he turned his attention to British railways. Initial experiments consisted of a Scotland to London service branded Stagecoach Rail with carriages attached to the Caledonian Sleeper. During the privatisation of British Rail, Stagecoach bid successfully to operate the South West Trains franchise from 1996 followed by the Island Line Trains later the same year. Stagecoach successfully bid to retain both when retendered in 2001 and 2006, before they passed to South Western Railway in 2017.

In 1998, Stagecoach purchased a 49% shareholding in Virgin Rail Group that operated the CrossCountry and West Coast franchises. In 2007, Stagecoach commenced operating the East Midlands Trains franchise. From April 2015 until June 2018, Virgin Trains East Coast, in which Stagecoach held a 90% share, operated the InterCity East Coast franchise.

=== Megabus ===
In 2003, Souter added the bus and coach operator Megabus to the group. With its slogan "Low Cost Inter City Travel Serving Europe", it offered discounted travel across the UK and Europe. In 2012 it operated in 31 cities in the UK with a turnover in excess of £2 billion, with annual profits of over £250 million.

In April 2013 Souter announced a new Megabus overnight sleeper service from Scotland to London. The sleeper coaches cost £5 million to build, and have 53 leather seats which can be converted into 42 bunk beds. Passengers receive a onesie for sleeping in during the trip. This service ended in May 2017, due to it being consistently loss-making, and the coaches are now only used on daytime services.

=== Souter Investments ===
Souter has more than 200 private investments, which are managed by his company, Souter Investments. It makes investments across a broad range of asset classes, with a primary focus on private equity and a portfolio of more than 25 direct unquoted investments. The total portfolio, excluding Stagecoach, has increased in value by 9% per annum over 12 years.

==== Highland Global Transport ====
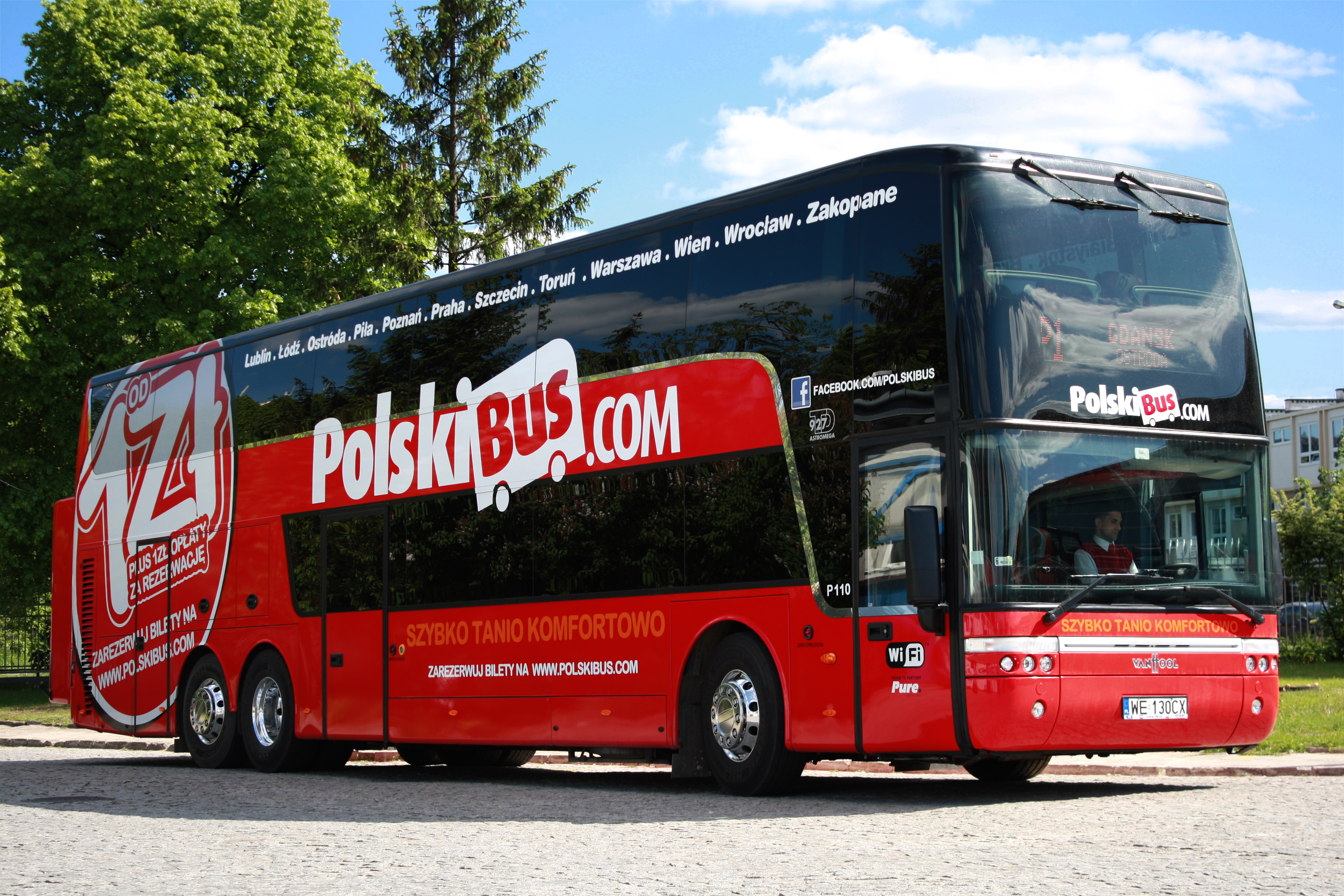
PolskiBus Van Hool Astromega TD927

Souter and his sister Ann Gloag formed Highland Global Transport in 2012. It owns a portfolio of transport related investments valued at more than £600M including:

- Stagecoach Group (26%)
- Istanbul Deniz Otobusleri, a ferry operator on the Bosphoros and Sea of Marmara, Turkey (held by HGT shareholders direct)
- PolskiBus, an intercity coach service operator in Poland, sold to Flixbus in December 2017
- Alexander Dennis, a bus and coach manufacturer in UK, Asia and North America. Mostly sold to NFI Group in May 2019.
- Argent Energy, a biodiesel manufacturer
- Sunseeker, a luxury motor yacht manufacturer
- OnniBus (75%), an intercity coach operator in Finland purchased in May 2014, sold October 2018
- SuperBus.com, an intercity coach operator in Baltic states

==== InMotion Group ====
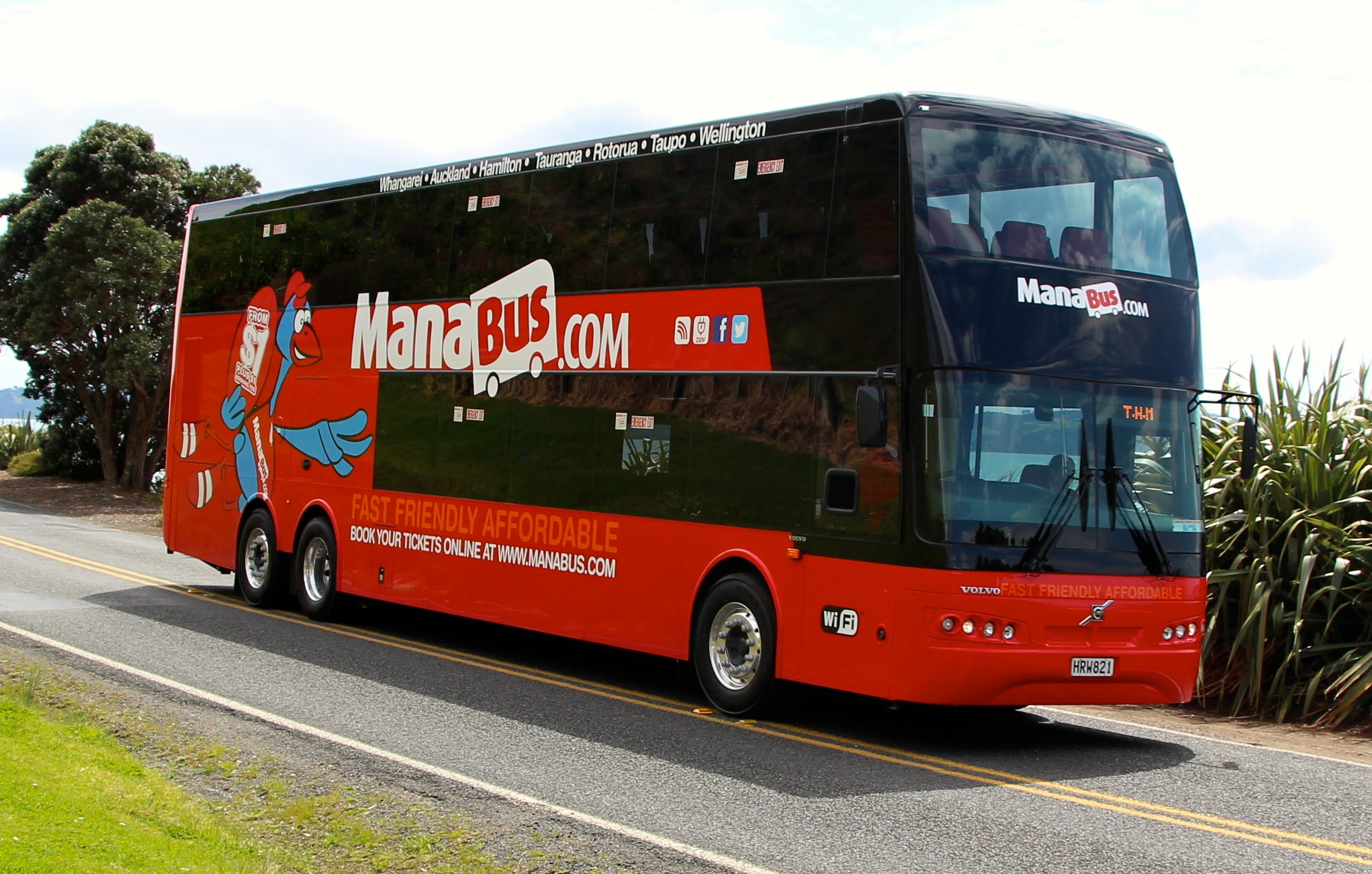
ManaBus Kiwi Bus Builders bodied Volvo B11R

Highland Global Transport has purchased and established a number of subsidiaries in New Zealand. In August 2015, these were brought together under the one umbrella as the InMotion Group with 340 buses and coaches and 17 ferries.

- Mana Coach Services, an urban bus operator in Wellington
- Howick & Eastern Buses, an urban bus operator in Auckland
- Fullers360, operator of commuter and tourist ferry services on Auckland Harbour and Hauraki Gulf
- ManaBus, an inter-city coach operator
- Naked Bus, an inter-city coach operator
- Reesby Buses, 40 vehicle coach operator

ManaBus and Naked Bus ceased operation on 15 July 2018, with the bus fleets being sold to Ritchies Transport. Reesby Buses was also sold to Ritchies in February 2019. Mana Coach Services and Howick & Eastern Buses were sold to Transdev in October and November 2019 respectively. This leaves Fullers360 as Souter's only subsidiary in New Zealand as of November 2019.

=== Institute of Chartered Accountants of Scotland ===
In April 2015, Souter was officially appointed vice president of the Institute of Chartered Accountants of Scotland, alongside newly appointed president, Jim Pettigrew. Souter, who qualified as a Chartered Accountant in 1984, was the sole nominee for the vice-president role. In May 2017 the organisation appointed him as its president.

== Political activity ==
=== Section 28 ===
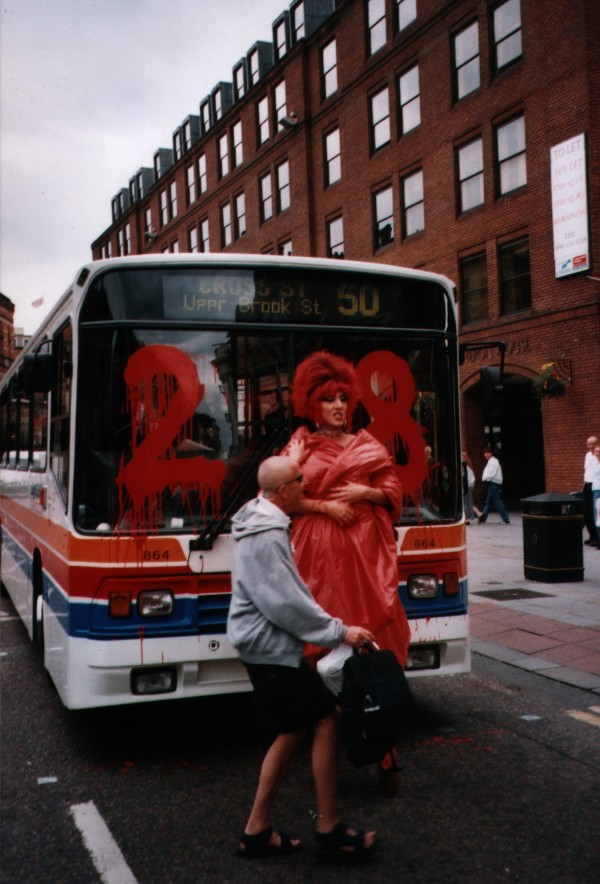
Section 28 protester with a Stagecoach Manchester bus in July 2000

In 2000, the Scottish Executive proposed the abolition of Section 28 laws, which forbade local authorities from "intentionally promoting homosexuality". Souter was a prominent leader of the Keep the Clause campaign, which sought to prevent its abolition. In Scotland, where Section 28 was known as clause 2A, Souter spent £1 million on the first privately funded postal referendum across Scotland to gauge public opinion. A spokesman for Souter stated "He is not in this for personal glory. He is fighting this battle because he is a father and committed Christian."

3,970,712 ballot papers were posted out and 31.8% valid votes were returned, a turnout rate lower than any Scottish national election. 86.8% were in favour of keeping Clause 28, 13.2% in favour of repeal.

Souter pointed out that the number of people who voted to keep the clause exceeded the number of votes cast for any single political party in Scotland at any election over the preceding ten years, although Scottish voters usually choose from four main parties, not two options. The campaign was ultimately unsuccessful.

Souter's campaign group approached the Electoral Reform Society to organise the ballot through its ballot services subsidiary. The society refused the request as it believed the poll "would not be a legitimate democratic exercise to ask people to give an opinion on the repeal of Section 28 without knowing the detail of what would replace it". Many groups hostile to Souter's stance had called for a public boycott of the poll, and accordingly claimed that as only a minority voted this was a defeat for Souter and his supporters. Mainstream politicians, including the Scottish National Party (which Souter has supported) largely ignored his poll and disputed whether the result was a true reflection of public opinion, with the Scottish Executive stating that the public had been fed a diet of "misinformation and lies" by Souter's campaign group. The Communities Minister, Wendy Alexander MSP, criticised the poll, stating "I think what is significant about today's ballot is that two out of three voters rejected, or binned or simply ignored this glorified opinion poll." Gay rights campaigner Peter Tatchell stated that "Brian Souter's support for Section 28 is the moral equivalent of the business-funded campaign to maintain racial segregation in the Deep South of the USA in the 1950s." Tatchell said that Souter's campaign was "hateful" and that it is clear that he was using his vast fortune to try to keep a cruel and "bigoted law" intact.

=== Donations to SNP and other political parties ===
Souter was a major financial supporter of the Scottish National Party (SNP). In March 2007, he donated £500,000, citing an imbalance of funding within Scottish politics. He stated that it was his intention to redress an imbalance in funding: "as long as I can remember, the case for the union has been hugely financed by cash from London, while the case for independence has lacked resources. I hope my donation will help redress this imbalance". Following the donation, SNP leader Alex Salmond was criticised for "pandering to homophobia" by accepting the donation. Salmond thanked Souter for his support, calling him "one of the outstanding entrepreneurs of his generation". One month later, in April 2007, the SNP's commitment (made at the party's 2006 conference) to re-regulate the bus network was dropped from the 2007 manifesto, although the SNP denied any direct link.

In February 2011 Souter again pledged financial support for the SNP, promising to match every pound they raised with a donation of up to £500,000. Announcing his support he said Salmond and the SNP deserved a second term in office. The SNP won a resounding victory in the election with Salmond being returned unopposed as First Minister.

The BBC reported in August 2014 that Souter had donated £1 million to the campaign for Scottish independence. Since Nicola Sturgeon became SNP leader in November 2014, Souter has made no further donation, but in December 2014 he gave £3,500 to the Lewes branch of the Liberal Democrats.

In 2023, Souter aided Humza Yousaf's government to organise a dinner between government and businesses. Patrick Harvie, the Minister for Zero Carbon Buildings, Active Travel and Tenants’ Rights stated "what has to be really, really clear is that not just my party, but the Scottish Government, does not share the values of Brian Souter.".

== Charitable work ==
In 1992 Souter and his wife set up the Souter Charitable Trust, which assists humanitarian projects in the UK and overseas, especially, but not exclusively, those with a Christian emphasis. Projects include the prevention of malaria and supplying daily meals to school children in Africa. The Trust has donated more than £98m to 13,000 worthwhile causes.

Groups funded annually by the trust include Tearfund, The Message Trust, Oasis Trust and Jam International.

In April 2019, Souter's company Stagecoach Southeast was announced as the sponsor of the annual Turner Prize for visual artists, but the sponsorship was ended a few days later by mutual agreement after public criticism of Souter's involvement in the sponsorship.

== Honours and awards ==
In 1997 Souter was granted an honorary degree from Strathclyde University.

In 1998 he was awarded the Scottish Entrepreneur Award.

In 1999 he received his second honorary degree, from Abertay University.

In 2004 he was honoured with the Businessman of the Year award at the Insider Elite Awards.

In 2008 he was given a Special Recognition Award for services to the bus industry.

In June 2010 he was given a Special Career Service Award at the "Talent In Mobility" Awards, part of the European Mobility Exhibition held in Paris for the public transport industry.

In October 2010 he was awarded the Ernst & Young UK Master Entrepreneur of the Year.

In 2011 he was presented with an outstanding achievement award at the 2011 Perthshire Chamber of Commerce Business Star Awards.

On 18 April 2012 he was inducted into the British Travel and Hospitality Industry Hall of Fame, the first public transport entrepreneur to receive the honour.

=== Knighthood ===
Souter was knighted in the 2011 Birthday Honours for services to transport and the voluntary sector. This proved controversial, and was criticised by Scottish Labour MP Cathy Jamieson, who suggested a link between the knighthood and the large amounts of money he has donated to the Scottish National Party. In a public statement, Jamieson said: "The First Minister and his party must look seriously at the relationship they have developed with wealthy individuals handing them large sums of cash. The public will rightly be asking what's next on Mr Souter's shopping list?" Salmond denied any wrongdoing in the matter and referred himself for investigation after calls for a probe by Scottish MP Jim Sheridan. An independent report, conducted by Lord Fraser of Carmyllie, cleared Salmond of any wrongdoing, asserting that "There appears to me to have been no breach of the ministerial code by Alex Salmond as First Minister and he should be wholly exonerated of any breach."

Souter's knighthood was also criticised by some gay rights campaigners, who felt that the honour was insulting to the gay community and was effectively rewarding homophobia, given Souter's past campaigning. A petition to have the knighthood withdrawn received 5,000 signatures by July 2011.

== Personal life ==
In 1998, Souter described English Northerners (who make up a considerable proportion of his customers) as "the beer-drinking, chip-eating, council house-dwelling, old Labour-voting masses."

Souter lives in Perth, Scotland with his wife and four children. He is a member of the Church of the Nazarene, and attends Trinity Church of the Nazarene in Perth.
