= Abertay University =

Public university in Scotland

- Former name: University of Abertay Dundee
- Motto: Latin: Beatus homo qui invenit sapientiam
- Motto in English: Blessed is the man who finds wisdom
- Type: Public
- Established: 1994 – granted University Status; 1888 – Dundee Institute of Technology
- Affiliations: MillionPlus; GuildHE; Universities Scotland
- Chancellor: Alice Brown
- Principal: Liz Bacon
- Chair of Court: David Brew
- Academic staff: 208
- Administrative staff: 300
- Students: 4,990 (2022/23)
- Undergraduates: 3,815 (2022/23)
- Postgraduates: 1,175 (2022/23)
- Location: Dundee, Scotland, UK; 56°27′48″N 2°58′25″W
- Colours: Blue, Red, Gold and Green
- Website: abertay.ac.uk

Abertay University (Scottish Gaelic: Oilthigh Obar Thatha) is a public university in the city of Dundee, Scotland. In 1872, Sir David Baxter, 1st Baronet of Kilmaron, left a bequest for the establishment of a mechanics' institute in Dundee and the Dundee Institute of Technology was formed in 1888. As early as 1902 it was recognised by the Scottish Education Department as an educational hub, and was one of the first to be designated a central institution, akin to an "industrial university". Abertay gained university status in 1994.

Abertay launched the world's first computer games degree in 1997 and in 2017 held a programme of events celebrating 20 Years of Games. Abertay was also the first to offer a degree in Ethical Hacking, starting in 2006.

== History ==
=== 1872–1900: The Baxter bequest and Founding ===
In 1872 Sir David Baxter, 1st Baronet of Kilmaron, died and bequeathed £20,000 (£1.96 million adjusting for inflation) for the establishment of a mechanics' institute in Dundee. The Baxter bequest was intended to create an educational establishment permitting young male working mechanics and other craftsmen to better themselves. After some years of delay the trustees finalised a scheme and met the conditions of the bequest and the Dundee Technical Institute opened on 15 October 1888 in grounds, purchased from University College, Dundee, adjacent to Small's Wynd, Dundee.

In 1901 the Dundee Technical Institute enrolled 723 part-time students and was one of the first education hubs to be recognised as a 'central institution' by the Scotch Education Department. In 1906 a new site in Bell Street, Dundee was purchased to build a larger complex to accommodate a growing student population. In 1911 the completed complex was formally opened as the Dundee Technical College & School of Art.

=== 1900–1994: Second bequest and First degrees ===
In 1909 James Duncan of Jordanstone left £60,000 (£6.17 million adjusting for inflation) to establish an art college in Dundee. The college of art became a formally separate institution, known as the Duncan of Jordanstone College of Art and Design, in 1975, remaining independent until 1994 when it became part of the University of Dundee.

The First World War reduced enrolments and growth but the vocational nature of the institute meant that its classes were relevant to the war effort. The first women students enrolled in 1914.

After the Second World War enrolments and the scope of delivery continued to expand, as did the reputation of the institute. By 1951 the institute was teaching courses that led to examinations for the external degrees of the University of London in pharmacy, mechanical, civil, and electrical engineering. In 1955 the National Council for Technological Awards was established and validated diplomas in technology which were equivalent in standard if not in name to honours degrees. The institution began offering degrees itself in 1956.

=== 1994–present: University status ===
Abertay University was created in 1994, under the Further and Higher Education Act 1992, granting the title "University of Abertay Dundee" to the Dundee Institute of Technology. Since 2014 the university has promoted itself as Abertay University. The university's name was formally changed to Abertay University by an Order of Council on 1 September 2019.

Abertay was the first university in the world to offer a "computer games" degree in 1997. Abertay was the UK's first university to be recognised as a Centre for Excellence in Computer Games Education, and is associated with a business support programme for computer game startups.

== Campus ==
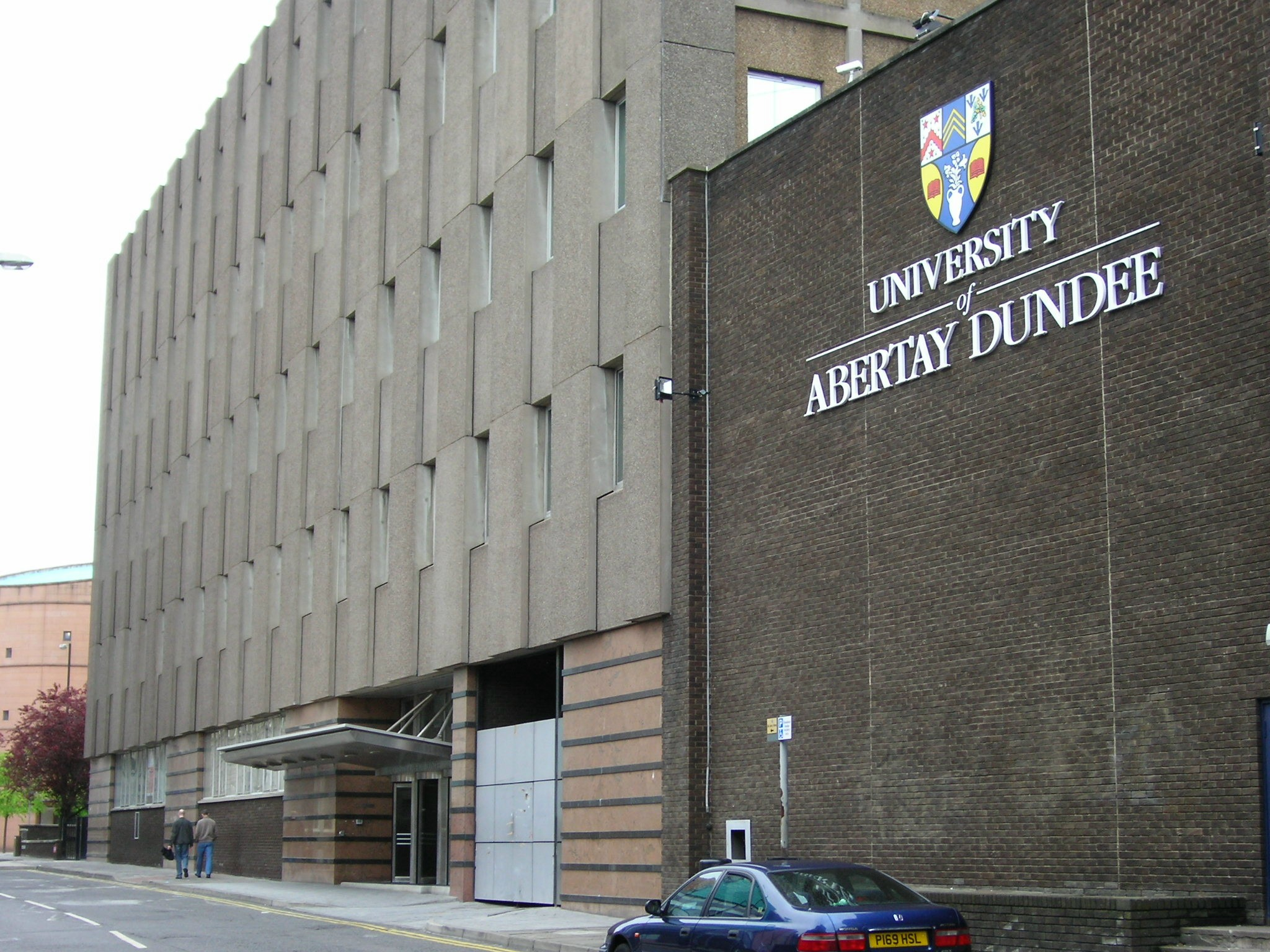
Kydd Building

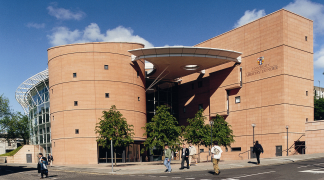
The Bernard King library

Abertay University is situated in the centre of Dundee. The campus buildings include the historic Old College buildings of Dundee Business School, the Bernard King Library, and others.

The Bernard King Library in Bell Street opened to learners in February 1998 and was formally opened by Queen Elizabeth II on 30 June 1998. The library was voted best new building in Scotland in the 1998 Scottish Design Awards competition.

The Abertay cyberQuarter opened in June 2022 with they key aim of bringing together students, academics, and organisations to help solve global cybersecurity challenges. The centre offers a physical space for collaboration and experimentation using digital tools and technologies.

== Academic profile ==
=== Rankings and reputation ===
Rankings
National rankings
- Complete (2027): 100
- Guardian (2027): 65
- Times / Sunday Times (2027): 60

Abertay is a small university that receives the majority of its funding for teaching rather than research. Nevertheless, according to the results of the Research Excellence Framework 2014 (REF2014), Abertay was the highest ranked modern university in Scotland for 'research intensity'. The university submitted an increased proportion of staff in REF2014 compared to RAE2008 and achieved an average score of 2.15 – which in REF terms means "quality that is recognised internationally in terms of originality, significance, and rigour". This was an improvement from the average score of 1.83, "national recognition", achieved in RAE2008.

The Research Excellence Framework 2021 (REF2021) published on 12 May 2022 and Abertay recorded a 23% increase in research that is "internationally excellent" or "world-leading" since the last REF in 2014. There was particularly strong performance in the areas of Art & Design (covering work in digital games), Engineering (including work in cybersecurity, computing and environmental engineering) and Food Science, which respectively had 83%, 73% and 65% of research rated as "internationally excellent" or "world-leading".

Abertay was the first university in the world to offer a "computer games" degree in 1997. In 2009 it established the UK's first Centre for Excellence in Computer Games Education, and a business support programme. Abertay runs five of the 25 interactive and games degree courses accredited in the UK by Creative Skillset, the industry skills body for the creative sector, more than any other institution.

=== Research ===
The Research and Knowledge Exchange Strategy 2020–2025 was published in March 2020 and groups research at the university into four main themes:

- Creative Industries & Cultural Vitality. This theme explores the creative use of interactive and immersive technologies in entertainment and non-entertainment spaces alike, and how they shape our everyday living, leisure and work cultures and practices.
- Health & Care Across the Lifespan considers human and societal challenges of adversity, mental and physical health, wellbeing, education, performance and social care and the roles that science, sport and physical activity have in addressing those challenges.
- Security, Equality & Social justice involves fostering personal, societal and organisational security and resilience in a time of increasing local, national and transnational threats and socio-technical disruption together with growing economic and health inequality
- Sustainable Development & Inclusive Living includes research on responsibly managing the natural resource requirements (and energy, food and water nexus) of inclusive living and business infrastructures and safeguard their transmission to future generations.

== Governance ==
The university was established by a statutory instrument The University of Abertay Dundee (Scotland) Order of Council 1994. The order sets out the objects of the university and the general functions of the University Court to 'conduct the affairs of the university and carry out and promote its objects'. The order requires that the University Court makes arrangements for a principal to be appointed to 'discharge the functions of the University Court (other than those delegated to Senate by virtue of article 36(3) of the Order) relating to the organisation and management of the university and to the discipline therein'. The Order requires that the University Court appoints and maintains a Senate, delegating to it 'the functions of the University Court relating to the overall planning, co-ordination, development and supervision of the academic work of the university; and such other functions of the University Court as may be assigned to the Senate by the University Court'.

== Notable features ==
=== Computer games education ===
Abertay was the UK's first University to be recognised as a Centre for Excellence in Computer Games Education.

The Centre for Excellence is accredited by Skillset and has strong links with industrial partners from across the broadcast, interactive and wider digital media sectors. These partners include BBC Scotland, BBC Vision, BSkyB, Channel 4, Electronic Arts, Codemasters, Blitz Games Studios, Rare, Sony Computer Entertainment Europe, Microsoft and Disney Interactive.

=== Ethical Hacking and Cyber-Security ===
Abertay was the first university in the world to have a degree in Ethical Hacking, differentiating from its other cyber-security degree counterparts by taking a more offensive approach to security. The university began to offer this degree in 2006. In 2020 the university was one of eight in the UK, and the only one in Scotland, to be named an Academic Centre of Excellence in Cybersecurity by the National Cybersecurity Centre.

The university is also home to the Ethical Hacking society, which hosts the Securi-Tay conference, the largest student-run security conference in Europe.

=== Upskilling Short Courses ===
Abertay provides a range of short courses that provide the public with opportunities to improve current skills and enhance knowledge in several areas including digital marketing and sustainability. Fully funded by the Scottish Funding Council, the courses are free to applicants. Each short course is credit-bearing and a recognised university qualification.

== Symbols ==
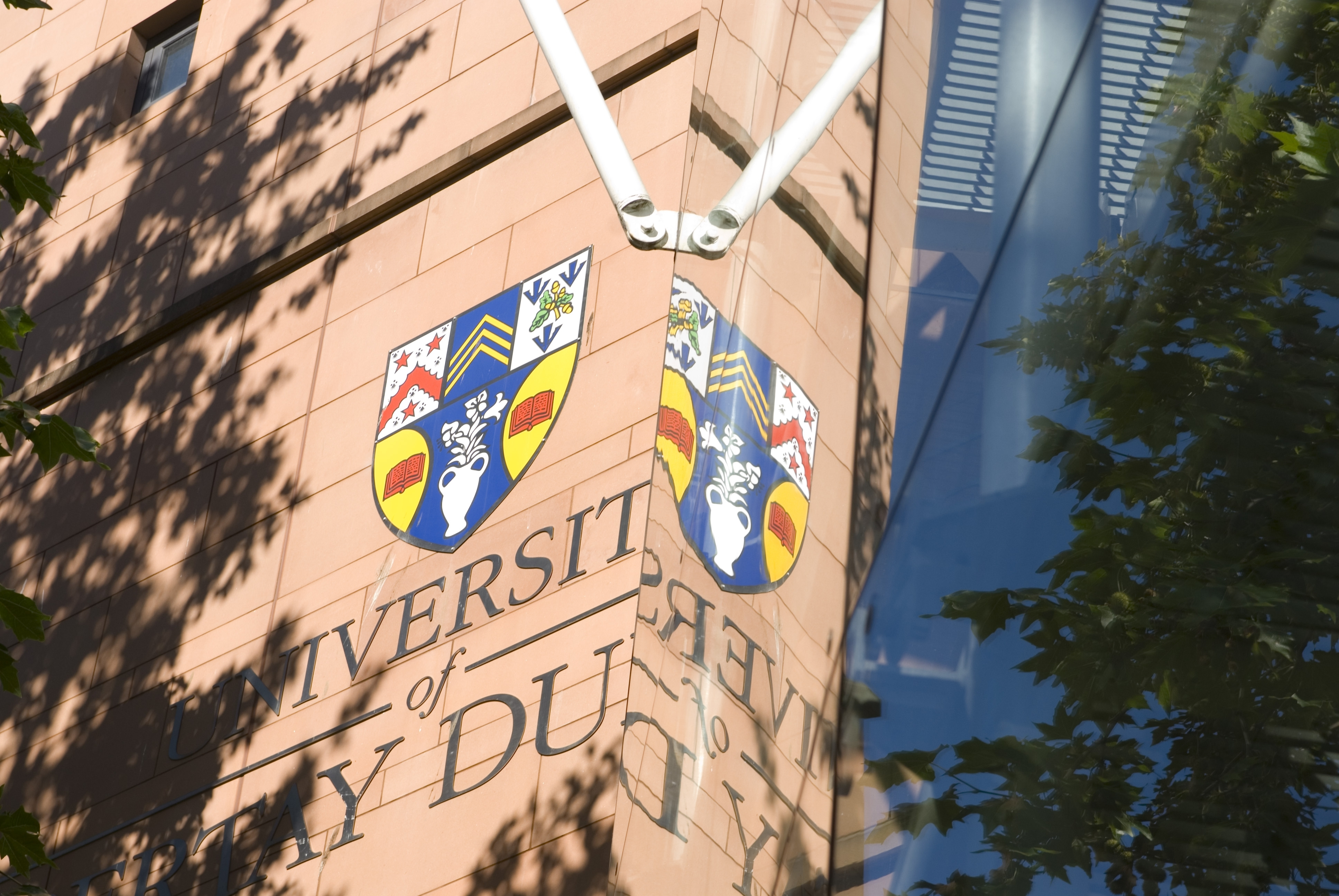
Logo of Abertay University on the side of the Bernard King Library

=== Coat of arms ===
Prior to 1953 no coat of arms was registered in the name of the college. The original Ensigns Armorial were recorded in the Public Register of All Arms and Bearings in Scotland on 25 July 1953, in the name of Dundee Technical College. They were subsequently transferred to Dundee College of Technology in 1977, then to Dundee Institute of Technology in 1988 and, finally, to the University of Abertay Dundee on 25 April 1994.

The arms are described as: "Party per fess, in chief tierced in pale: 1st, Ermine, a chevron engrailed between three mullets Gules; 2nd, Azure, three chevronels Or; 3rd, Argent, a spray of oak Proper fructed Or between three pheons Azure; in base Azure, a pot of three flowering lilies Argent between two flanches Or each charged with a book Gules."

The top left sector is taken from the arms of Sir David Baxter of Kilmaron, who bequeathed a significant sum of money in order to establish the original Dundee Technical Institute in 1888. The top right sector is taken from the arms of Sir William Dalgleish, who was the senior trustee of what by then was known as Dundee Technical College and School of Art, and who opened the first building – Old College – on Abertay's present campus on Bell Street in 1911. The top middle sector of three chevrons is the heraldic symbol for "technical". The pot of lilies in base is taken from the arms of the City of Dundee, with the books on either side representing education.

=== Motto ===
Beatus homo qui invenit sapientiam (Blessed is the man who finds wisdom).

=== Tartan ===
Aaron McCauley, a graduate of Abertay, designed and registered the Abertay tartan in 2003. The tartan is based on Abertay's promotional colours of dark blue, red, gold and green from its coat of arms.

== Student life ==
=== Accommodation ===
- Lyon Street
- Old Mill
- Merry Halls
- Parker House - iQ Student Accommodation
- Meadowside Court
- Telephone House (opens September 2026)

=== Abertay Students' Association ===
The Abertay Students' Association (Abertay SA) is based in the ground floor of the Bernard King library building. Abertay SA co-ordinates all societies and acts as the voice and representation of all of Abertay's students.

=== Sport ===
Abertay University has a wide group of sports teams competing under the university banner. It ranges from Tennis to Hockey who compete in the BUCS (British Universities & Colleges Sport) leagues, which competes against other universities and colleges in Scotland. The Football, Hockey and Basketball teams have their 1st teams competing in the highest league (BUCS 1A). The university has a fierce rivalry with Dundee University, competing in a yearly Varsity competition.

== Notable alumni and staff ==
- Roger Ball, musician, founding member Average White Band
- Vikki Bunce, Scottish field hockey player
- Victoria Drummond, first female Merchant Navy engineer in Britain
- Malcolm Duncan, musician, founding member Average White Band
- Joe FitzPatrick, Scottish National Party MSP, Scottish Government Minister for Parliamentary Business
- Stewart Hosie, Scottish National Party MP
- David Jones, DMA Design founder – now Rockstar North - creator of GTA and Lemmings franchises
- Bella Keyzer (1922 – 1992) women's equality icon was retrained at Dundee Technical College to be a shipyard welder in 1976
- Maurice Malpas, Scottish football player and manager, spent his entire professional playing career at Dundee United F.C. and was capped for the Scotland national football team 55 times
- Iain McNicol, General Secretary of the Labour Party (UK)
- Stuart McMillan, Scottish National Party MSP
- Andy Nicol, Scottish Rugby Union player, team captain; also represented the Barbarians and British Lions
- Gavin Clydesdale Reid, economist and past president of the Scottish Economic Society (1999–2002)
- William Samson, former staff member and Scottish astronomer, mathematician, and computer scientist
- Tom Smith, Scottish Rugby Union player and coach, also represented Northampton Saints and British Lions
- Sir Brian Souter, Stagecoach founder

== See also ==
- List of UCAS institutions
- List of universities in the United Kingdom
