= OnniBus.com =

Finnish bus company

- Parent: Koiviston Auto; Pekka Möttö; Pertti Möttö
- Commenced operation: 2011
- Headquarters: Tampere
- Service area: Finland
- Service type: Express coach operator
- Routes: 17
- Hubs: Kamppi Center, Helsinki; Jyväskylä railway station, Jyväskylä
- Depots: Tampere
- Fleet: 48 Van Hool Astromega TDX27s; 10 Van Hool Altano TD921s
- Website: www.onnibus.com (in English)

OnniBus.com is a Finnish express coach operator. It commenced operating in 2011.

== History ==
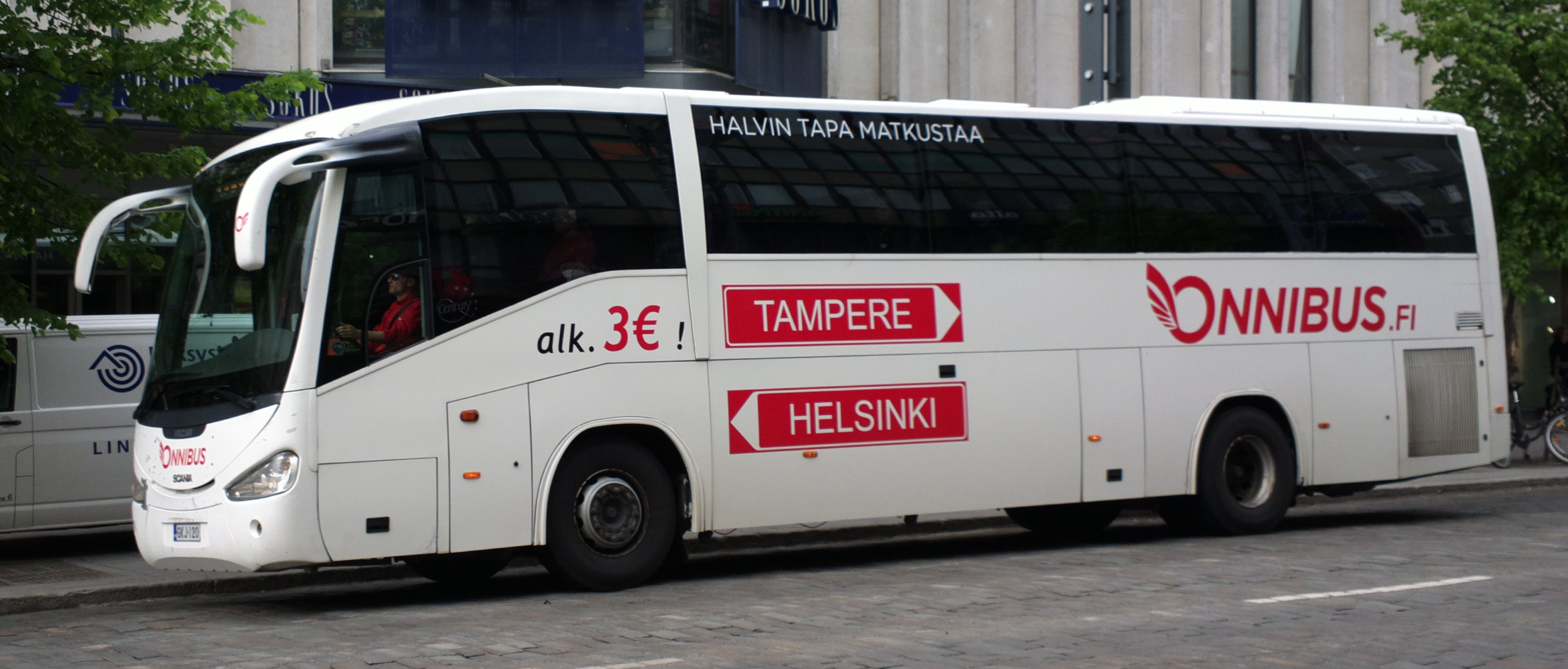
Irizar Century OnniBus coach in Tampere in June 2014

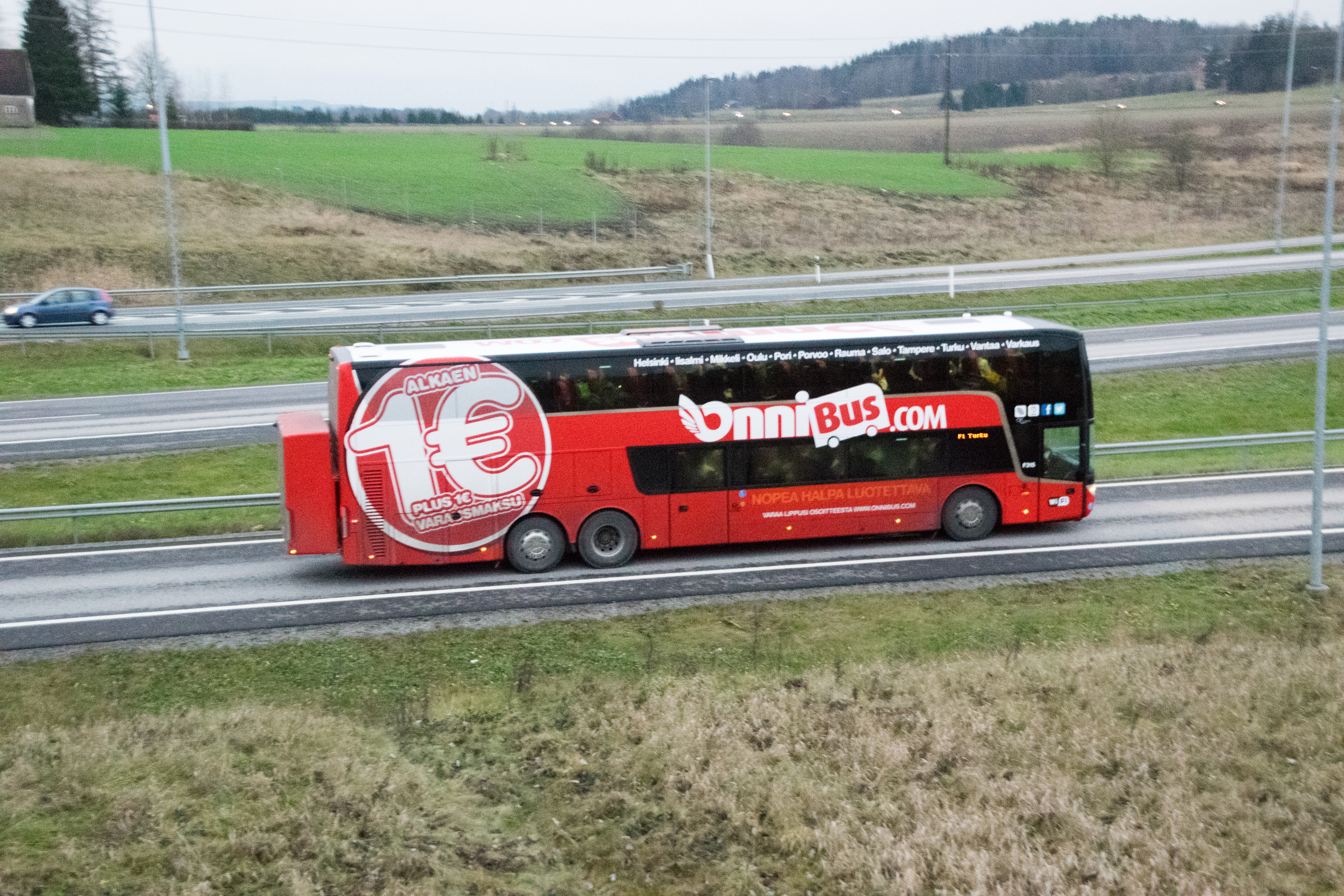
Van Hool TD927 on line F1 from Helsinki to Turku.

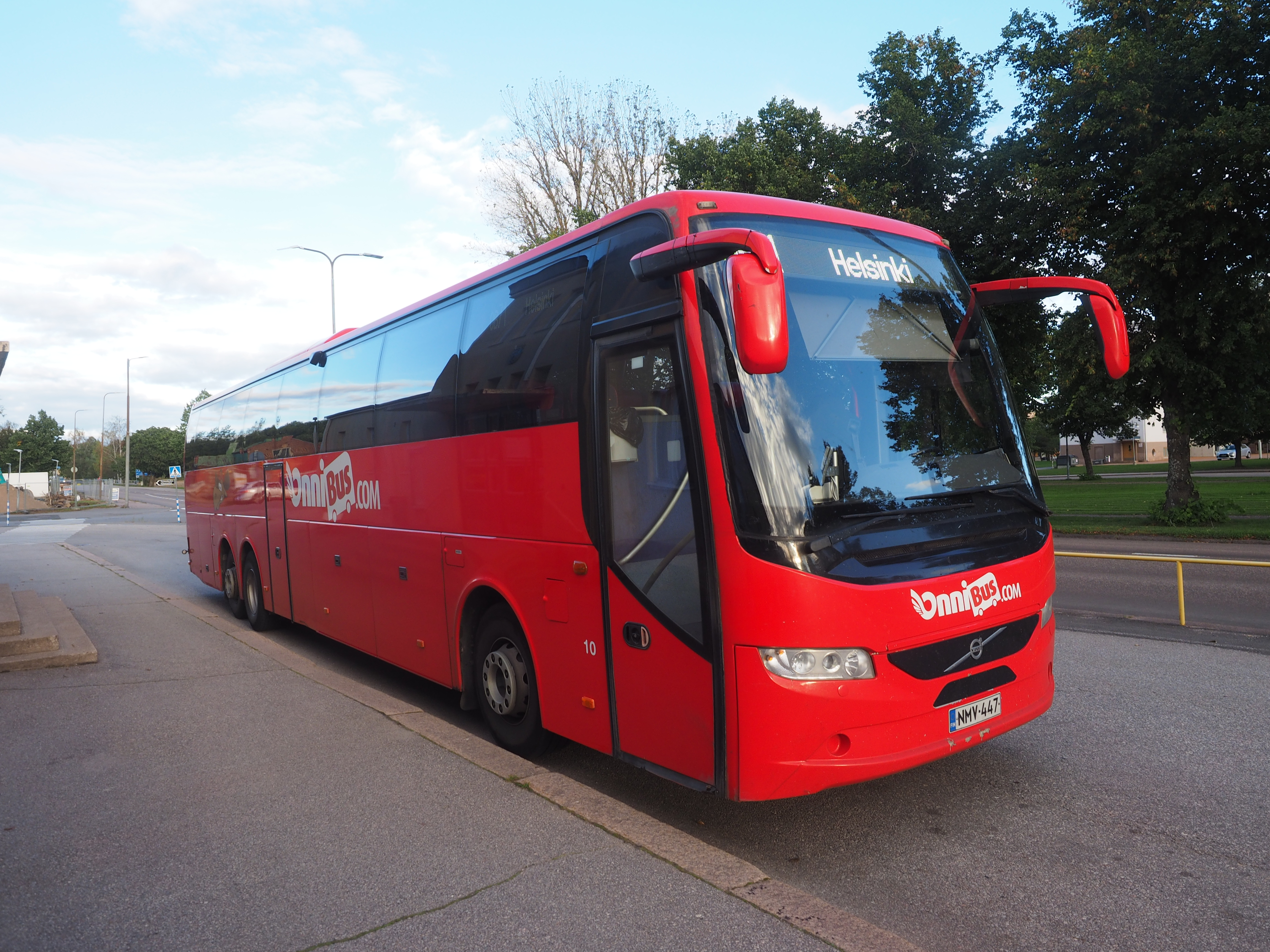
An Onnibus coach to Helsinki waiting for boarding in Loviisa.

OnniBus was founded by Pekka Möttö, Lauri Helke, Petteri Rantala and Pertti Möttö in 2011.

In May 2014, Brian Souter's Highland Global Transport purchased a 75% shareholding in the business. Highland Global Transport, Lauri Helke and Petteri Rantala sold their shares to Koiviston Auto in October 2018.

Advertised fares start at €1 (plus €1 booking fee), using a yield management model as employed by Megabus, where the lowest fares are offered to those who book early or on less popular journeys.

== Services ==
As of July 2023, OnniBus.com operated OnniBus MEGA brand services on the following routes:

- M1: Helsinki – Turku – Naantali
- M2: Helsinki – Pori – Vaasa
- M3: Helsinki – Tampere – Seinäjoki – Vaasa
- M4: Helsinki – Lahti - Jyväskylä – Oulu/Rovaniemi
- M4-SKI: Helsinki – Jyväskylä – Oulu – Ylläs – Levi
- M5: Helsinki – Mikkeli –
- M6: Helsinki – Kouvola - Lappeenranta – Imatra - Joensuu
- M7: Helsinki – Kotka
- M8: Helsinki – Turku – Pori – Vaasa – Kokkola – Oulu
- M9: Turku – Tampere – Jyväskylä – Kuopio – Kajaani
- M12: Tampere - Lahti – Kouvola – Lappeenranta
- M13: Helsinki – Jyväskylä – Kokkola
- M14: Helsinki – Lahti – Mikkeli – Savonlinna

Aside from the cities mentioned above, OnniBus MEGA buses stop at numerous other places but unlike OnniBus Flex branded buses, they do not stop at all express stops on the way. Passengers can board and leave the bus only at predetermined stops, often located at city and town centres or highway junctions. This practice cuts travel times whilst also making business more profitable according to the company.

== Fleet ==
OnniBus operates a fleet of 48 Van Hool Astromega TDX27s as of October 2015. In March 2016 Onnibus imported used Van Hool Altano TD921s from its sister company, PolskiBus. They have all since been returned back to PolskiBus.
