= Scottish Journal of Political Economy =

- Discipline: Political science and economics
- Language: English

Publication details
- History: 1954–present
- Publisher: Wiley Publishing (United Kingdom)
- Frequency: Quarterly
- Impact factor: 1.2 (2024)

Standard abbreviations
- ISO 4: Scott. J. Political Econ.

Indexing
- ISSN: 1467-9485
- LCCN: 65031400
- OCLC no.: 173431230

Links
- Journal homepage; Online access; Online archive

Scottish Journal of Political Economy is a scholarly economics journal published by the Scottish Economic Society.

Sir Alexander Cairncross was the first editor in 1954. Since 2021 the editor is David A. Jaeger.

According to the Journal Citation Reports, the journal has a 2024 impact factor 1.2, ranking it 224 out of 322 journals in the category "Political Science" and 353 out of 617 journals in the category "Economics".

The journal is published by Wiley Publishing under ISSN 1467-9485. Since January 2022 the journal is published exclusively online.
