= InterCity (New Zealand) =

New Zealand commercial intercity bus company

Entrada Travel Group

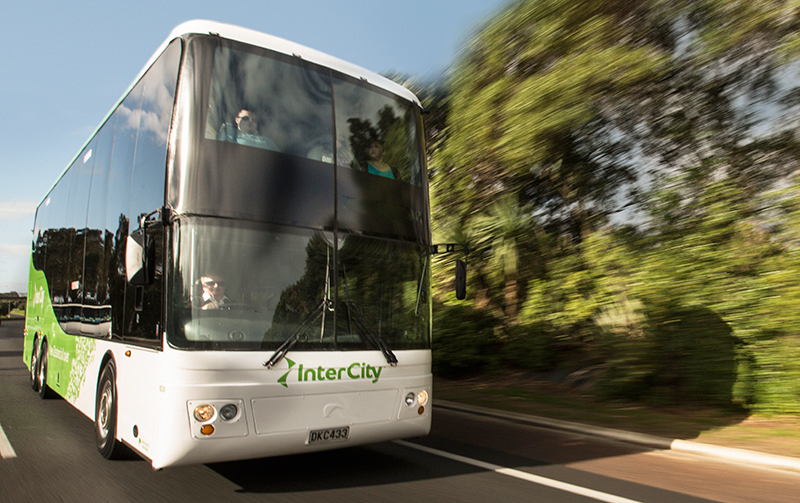
- InterCity double-decker coach
- Parent: Ritchies Transport (46.3%); Tranzit Group (46.3%); Nelson Coachlines (7.4%)
- Founded: 1991; 35 years ago
- Headquarters: Auckland, New Zealand
- Locale: New Zealand
- Service area: New Zealand
- Service type: Intercity bus service
- Destinations: 600
- Chief executive: Dan Alpe
- Website: www.intercity.co.nz

InterCity is a passenger transport and tourism company in New Zealand. Its parent company is Entrada Travel Group, whose main owners are Ritchies Transport and the Tranzit Group. Entrada operates the country's only long distance bus network, and ferries and cruises in the Bay of Islands.

Entrada's brands are:

- InterCity, New Zealand's only long distance bus network, servicing around 600 towns and communities daily
- Gray Line, New Zealand licence holder of premium sightseeing tours within New Zealand
- GreatSights New Zealand, premium sightseeing coach services
- Fullers GreatSights, sightseeing cruises and day tours in the Bay of Islands and Northland
- awesomeNZ.com (formerly Kings Dolphin Cruises and Eco Tours), sightseeing tours and boat cruises
- Auckland Explorer Bus, hop-on hop-off sightseeing tour bus company in Auckland
- Skip Bus, low-cost North Island bus express

== Ownership ==
InterCity has been the only New Zealand-owned long-distance bus service since Nakedbus was acquired by foreign-owned ManaBus in 2015; ManaBus ceased operating in 2018. In November 2018, InterCity started a new express bus service, SKIP, offering affordable, reliable and faster connections between major North Island cities.

InterCity and Entrada Travel Group are controlled by Ritchies Transport and Tranzit Group, each owning 46%.

== History ==
InterCity is the direct successor to New Zealand Railways Road Services long-distance routes. New Zealand Railways' rail and road services were combined in 1985 as the Passenger Business Group of the New Zealand Railways Corporation. InterCity began in 1987 as the brand for long-distance rail and road services.

In 1991 the rail-based assets were transferred to New Zealand Rail and the long distance buses and InterCity name were bought by InterCity Management Limited, a group of seven of the country's largest private coach companies - Whangarei Bus Services, Bayline Group, Ritchies Transport, Tranzit Group, Guthreys Coachlines, Nelson SBL and PTL Route Services - as a franchise-based operation. Each of the franchisees is responsible for operating set routes, usually close to their home base. Of the original seven franchisees four remain, with one new franchisee (SDK Ltd) operating services in Northland where Whangarei Bus Services previously held the franchise.

Over the years the company name has changed from InterCity Coachlines Ltd to Coachnet NZ Ltd, followed by InterCity Group Ltd and InterCity Holdings Ltd.

In 2019, the group name changed from InterCity Group to Entrada Travel Group.

== Trademark protection ==
In 2014 InterCity Group won a landmark Google Adwords case against competitor Nakedbus in the Auckland High Court for breach of trade mark.

Justice Raynor Asher ruled that Nakedbus deliberately infringed InterCity Group Limited’s trade mark ‘INTERCITY’, engaged in misleading and deceptive conduct that confused consumers, and illegitimately attempted to pass its business off as InterCity’s.

They ran advertisements on Google which would respond to searches for InterCity Group’s trade mark, INTERCITY, and which promoted their buses as "inter city" in both the advertisements and on the corresponding website. The Court has confirmed that this was part of a misleading strategy to "hook" InterCity customers into travelling to their website, using InterCity’s trade mark to confuse the customers into thinking that Nakedbus was an affiliate.

Nakedbus argued that the words "inter" and "city" were just descriptors for domestic bus services. This argument was easily rejected by the Court. It recognised that ‘InterCity’ is a distinctive and well known New Zealand brand which is entitled to the usual statutory protections.

== Expansion ==
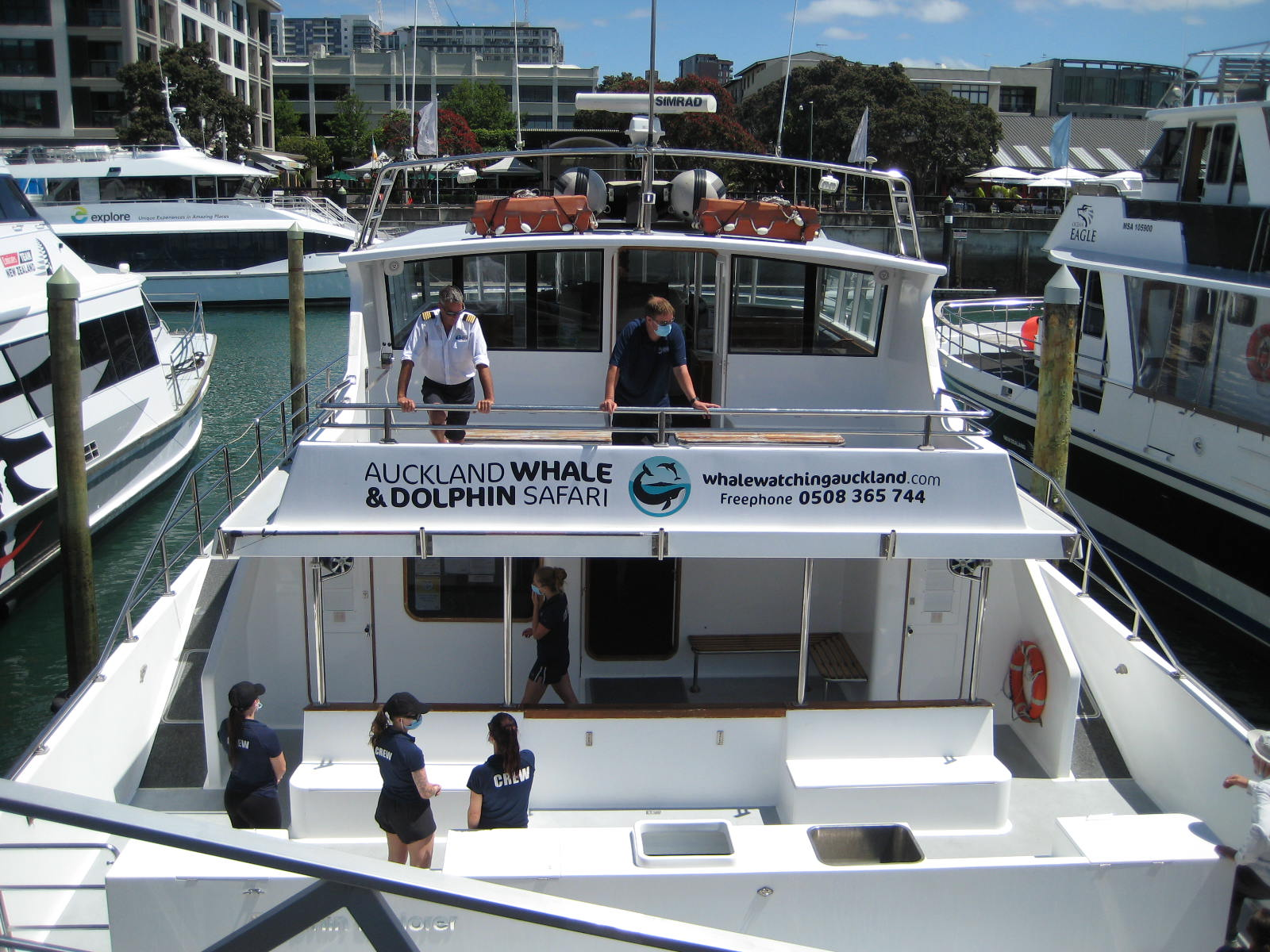
Auckland Whale & Dolphin Safari's Dolphin Explorer in Viaduct Basin

In 2006 Entrada Travel Group purchased Kings Dolphin Cruises, a Paihia based operator of sightseeing cruises and day tours. This purchase was the group's first foray beyond road passenger transport services. It also increased InterCity's exposure to the tourism market.

Entrada Travel Group's footprint in the tourism market increased again in December 2007 when it added the Tourism Holdings Limited Ltd businesses of Great Sights and Fullers Bay of Islands by way of a joint venture. In December 2008 Tourism Holdings sold its 49% stake in InterCity Holdings Limited to InterCity Group for $9.5m.

In August 2016, the company was awarded the licence to operate sightseeing services in New Zealand as Gray Line, the world's largest sightseeing brand.

In 2019, Entrada Travel Group acquired Auckland Whale & Dolphin Safari, which hosts thousands of guests every year aboard the 20-metre catamaran Dolphin Explorer on daily 4.5-hour cruises from Auckland's Viaduct Harbour.

== Gray Line ==
In 2016 Entrada Travel Group was awarded the licence to operate Gray Line sightseeing tours in New Zealand.

== GreatSights New Zealand ==
Older GreatSights New Zealand logo

GreatSights New Zealand is InterCity Group's daily sightseeing subsidiary operating day tours and sightseeing from Auckland, Rotorua, Christchurch and Queenstown to the Bay of Islands, the Waitomo Caves, Hobbiton, Rotorua, Aoraki, Te Anau and Milford Sound.

GreatSights was formed in October 1987 following acquisition of the coach assets of Fourways Coachlines by various Newmans Group companies and was subsequently taken over by Corporate Investments Limited (CIL), then in 1993 by The Helicopter Line (later renamed Tourism Holdings Ltd, THL).

Glass-roofed double-decker Volvo B12 coaches were introduced onto the Milford Sound route in 1996.

In 1998 THL purchased a number of assets from Mount Cook Group including the Gray Line New Zealand franchise, which GreatSights operated until 2006.

In 2000 GreatSights opened a visitor information centre at 180 Quay Street, Auckland. This became the departure point for all GreatSights day tours from Auckland. The centre was closed following InterCity's acquisition of GreatSights, as InterCity already operated a similar visitor information centre on Hobson Street. Also as a result of the acquisition, in April 2008 the Newmans Coach Lines brand gradually began to be removed from routes that were operated by GreatSights.

In recent years GreatSights has enjoyed strong growth in line with rising visitor arrivals into New Zealand. A number of new routes and tour options have been added to the network including a new Waitomo & Rotorua tour in 2009.

Coinciding the complete fleet upgrade in 2016 the brand was refreshed and saw the introduction of diamond device to symbolise the relationship between the company's operations on land and sea.

== Fullers GreatSights ==
Fullers GreatSights is a sub brand of GreatSights, operating cruise, ferry and land sightseeing tours from the Bay of Islands. The head office is based in the visitor centre in the Maritime Building on Paihia's waterfront, with a visitor centre in Russell and a workshop in Opua.

The Fullers business was founded in 1886 when Albert Ernest Fuller started a business delivering coal and other essential supplies to islands in the Bay of Islands in his vessel the Undine. Fuller branched out into tourism in 1927 when he started the Cream Trip service transporting cream from the islands to the mainland. Tourists would pay to ride on the Cream Trip and over time the focus of the service changed from deliveries and transport to one of sightseeing and tourism.

The business has expanded substantially over the years and today its primary focus is tourism, although it does also operate passenger and vehicle ferries. The Fullers GreatSights product range includes:

- The Cream Trip
- Hole in the Rock dolphin-watching cruises
- Dolphin swimming cruises
- Ninety Mile Beach and Cape Reinga day tours
- Excursions in and around Kerikeri and Russell
- Discover Hokianga
- Vehicle ferries between Opua and Okiato
- Passenger ferries between Russell and Paihia

In 2009 Fullers Bay of Islands was rebranded Fullers GreatSights Bay of Islands, providing connection to InterCity's sightseeing tours in the rest of New Zealand, and a new awesomeNZ brand was introduced. The Kings Dolphin Cruises, Northern Exposure and Awesome Adventures brands were removed. AwesomeNZ branded excursions include Ninety Mile Beach day tours and Milford Sound day tours.

In 2016 the rebrand of the main GreatSights brand saw the name shortened to Fullers GreatSights.

== Newmans Coach Lines ==

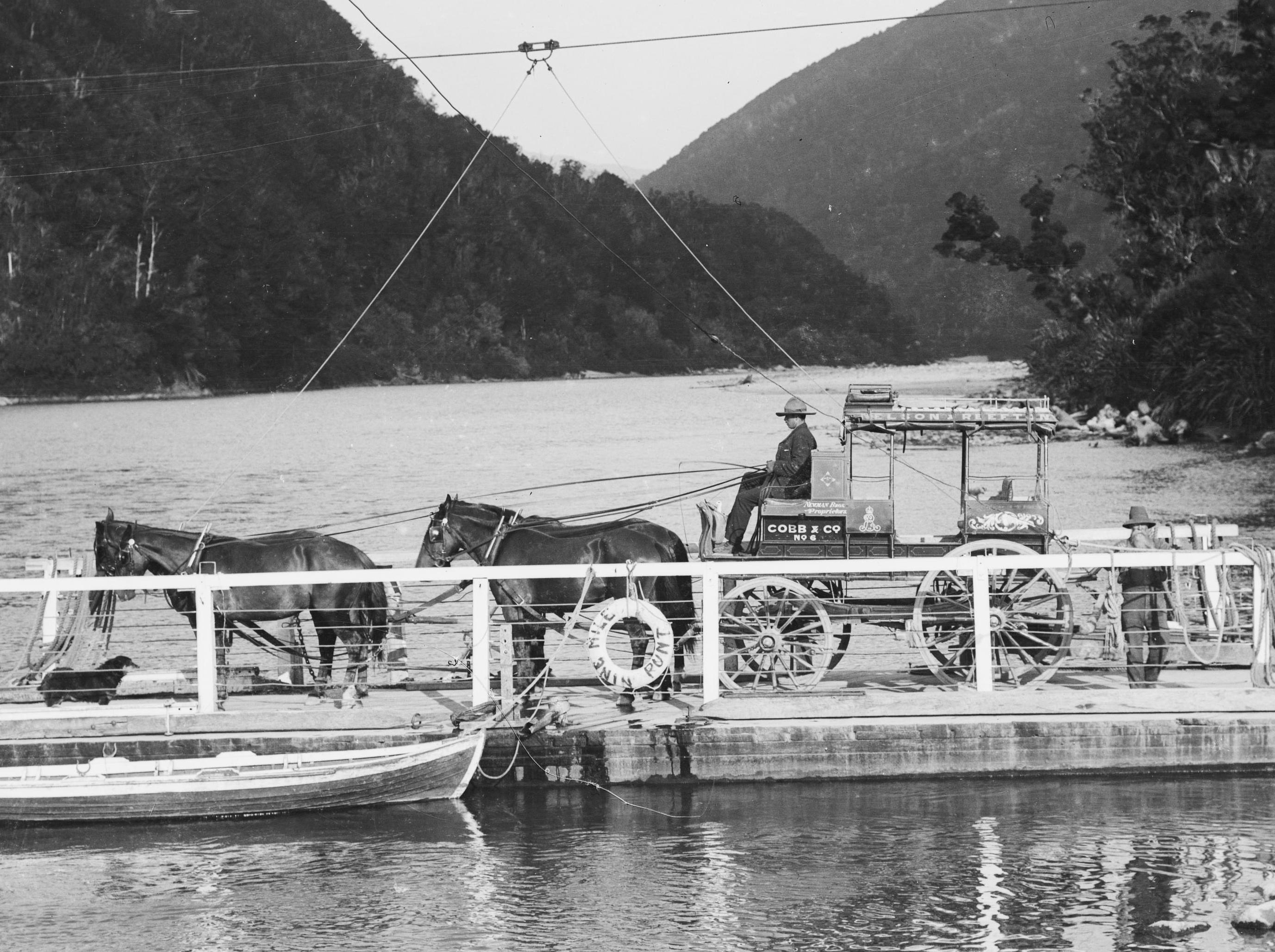
Newman Bros. Nelson-Reefton mail coach crossing the Buller River on the Nine Mile Punt circa 1910 displaying Cobb & Co brand

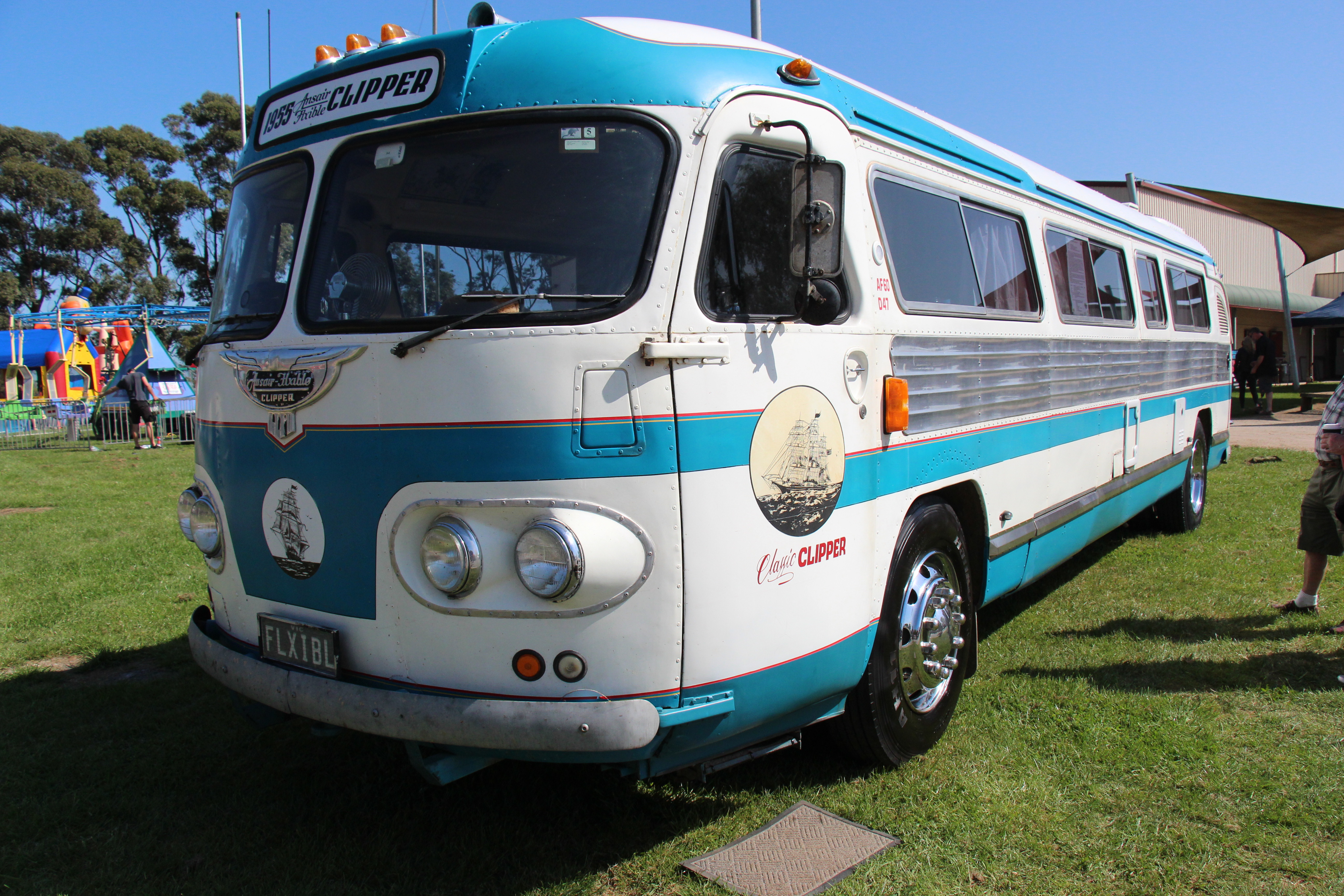
Ansair Flxible Clipper as operated by Newman from 1955

Newmans Coach Lines began in Nelson in 1879 with brothers Tom and Harry Newman offering a horse-drawn coach service delivering mail around the Nelson region. The business grew rapidly and expanded to include passenger services, at first throughout the South Island and later into the North Island. In 1911 the first motor vehicle - a four-cylinder Cadillac - was introduced and in 1918 the last horse-drawn carriage was retired from service.

Newmans remained a family-owned business until 1972 when it merged with Transport (Nelson) Ltd, a trucking and mining company. There followed a period of expansion where the Newmans brand encompassed tours, rental cars and campervans and a short-lived airline brand Newmans Air which evolved into Ansett New Zealand.

In 1988 Corporate Investments Limited took over the business and several routes were withdrawn. In 1991 an agreement was reached where competitor Mount Cook Group ceased operating in the North Island and Newmans ceased operating in the South Island. This step was not enough and in 1992 TTRB Ltd, a consortium of four coach operators (Tranzit Group, Taranaki Coachlines, Ritchies Transport and Bayline Group), took over Newmans Coach Lines. By 1994 two of the consortium members had withdrawn and the remaining two shareholders Tranzit and Ritchies operated it as a separate business until the Auckland power crisis in 1998 when Newmans was integrated into the InterCity Group business.

From 1995 to 2007 the Newmans brand was used on both sightseeing day tours and passenger route services. From 2008 the Newmans brand was withdrawn from sightseeing day tours in favour of GreatSights, but Newmans coach services still run between Christchurch, Queenstown, Wānaka and the West Coast glaciers.

From 1987 until 1993, operations were operated in the Australian cities of Cairns and Sydney as Newmans Coach Lines.

== Hauraki Blue Cruises ==
In 2009 Fullers GreatSights launched the cruise catamaran Ipipiri, a 44.5m (146 foot) vessel with four levels including sundeck, restaurant and bar, and 30 ocean view cabins offering accommodation for up to 60. Ipipiri operated in the Bay of Islands for five seasons as an overnight cruise ship and was available for conferences, events and weddings.

In 2014 Ipipiri was relocated to Auckland. Trading as Hauraki Blue Cruises under the GreatSights brand, it offered overnight cruises, lunch cruises, and a charter venue for weddings, conferences and events in the Hauraki Gulf. Hauraki Blue Cruises ceased operating in July 2017.

== Skip Bus ==
Skip Bus was a low cost, express bus company launched by InterCity in November 2018. It offered bus travel between many North Island destinations, including Whangārei, Auckland, Hamilton, Rotorua, Taupō, Tauranga and Wellington. Skip buses have since been suspended since 25 March 2020 due to the COVID-19 pandemic and has not been reinstated since with the Skip Bus website no longer being active.

== Environmental projects ==
Entrada Travel Group has embarked on a number of sustainability projects since 1998.

In May 2007 InterCity joined Landcare Research's CarboNZero programme but withdrew when the New Zealand Government introduced an Emissions Trading Scheme.

In 2010 Entrada Travel Group's Bay of Islands operations were awarded an Enviro Gold rating by Qualmark. Fullers GreatSights and InterCity Group's coaching division both currently hold Qualmark Gold ratings.
