= Bella Keyzer =

(1922–1992), Scottish textile and shipyard worker, and women's activist

- by A.Gow (fair use only)
- Born: Isabella Mitchell; 29 August 1922; Dundee
- Died: 18 July 1992 (aged 69); Dundee
- Occupations: weaver and welder
- Employer: Caledon
- Known for: an icon for women's equality
- Spouse: Dirk Keyzer
- Children: one

Isabella "Bella" Keyzer born Isabella Mitchell (29 August 1922 – 18 July 1992) was a Scottish weaver who became a welder and shipyard worker. Following the Sex Discrimination Act in 1975 she returned to her wartime occupation as a welder in the Scottish shipyards. She is recognised as an icon for women's equality.

== Life ==
Keyzer was born in Dundee in 1922. She was the last of three children born to Isabella (born Campbell) and Thomas Mitchell. Her mother worked as a cleaner and in confectionary and her father was a foreman in a bakery and he had been married before. The family of five lived in two rooms but her home had a good supply of books. Their parents had given her brother the middle name of Lenin. Her father was an active trade unionist and he was placed in prison during the 1926 General Strike.

As soon as she left school she was trained as a weaver and she held that job until well after the second world war broke out in 1939. She was still weaving canvas in 1941 but she had a child with Dirk Keyzer who fought with the allies as a member of the Dutch Royal Navy. He was mentioned in dispatches for bravery in evacuating British Military Personnel at Dunkirk and awarded medals by Queen Wilhelmina of the Netherlands. He is commemorated in the Marinemuseum in Den Helder (Netherlands) They married on his return from the war.

In 1942, Keyzer decided that she could get more time with her child if she became a welder. At the time she was working long hours as a munitions worker. She was accepted for training in Rosyth for six weeks and returned to the Caledon shipyard to work alongside the other (male) welders. She had a steady job until just before the war ended. She married Dirk Keyzer on 1 November 1949 and they went to live in the Netherlands until 1957. She was fluent in the Dutch language. In 1975 the Sex Opportunities Act was passed in 1975. She went back to work in the UK and in 1976 she enrolled at 1976 Dundee Technical College where she reminded herself of her skill at welding. The union accepted her as a member but she did not get any interviews until she applied as "Mr I. Keyzer". It was a lonely path but she re-entered the shipyards, as she later said, as a "fat grey haired wifee".

In the last half of the 1980s her contribution came to notice. The Dundee Oral History Project began in 1985 and interviews by BBC2 and Scottish Television. In 1992 Dundee District Council recognised her as a role model for improving women’s equality and gave her an award.

Keyzer died in Dundee in 1992. She has a plaque in Dundee to record her life.
