= Joseph Shield Nicholson =

British economist (1850–1927)

- Born: 9 November 1850; Wrawby, Lincolnshire
- Died: 12 March 1927 (aged 76); Edinburgh
- Awards: Guy Medal in Silver

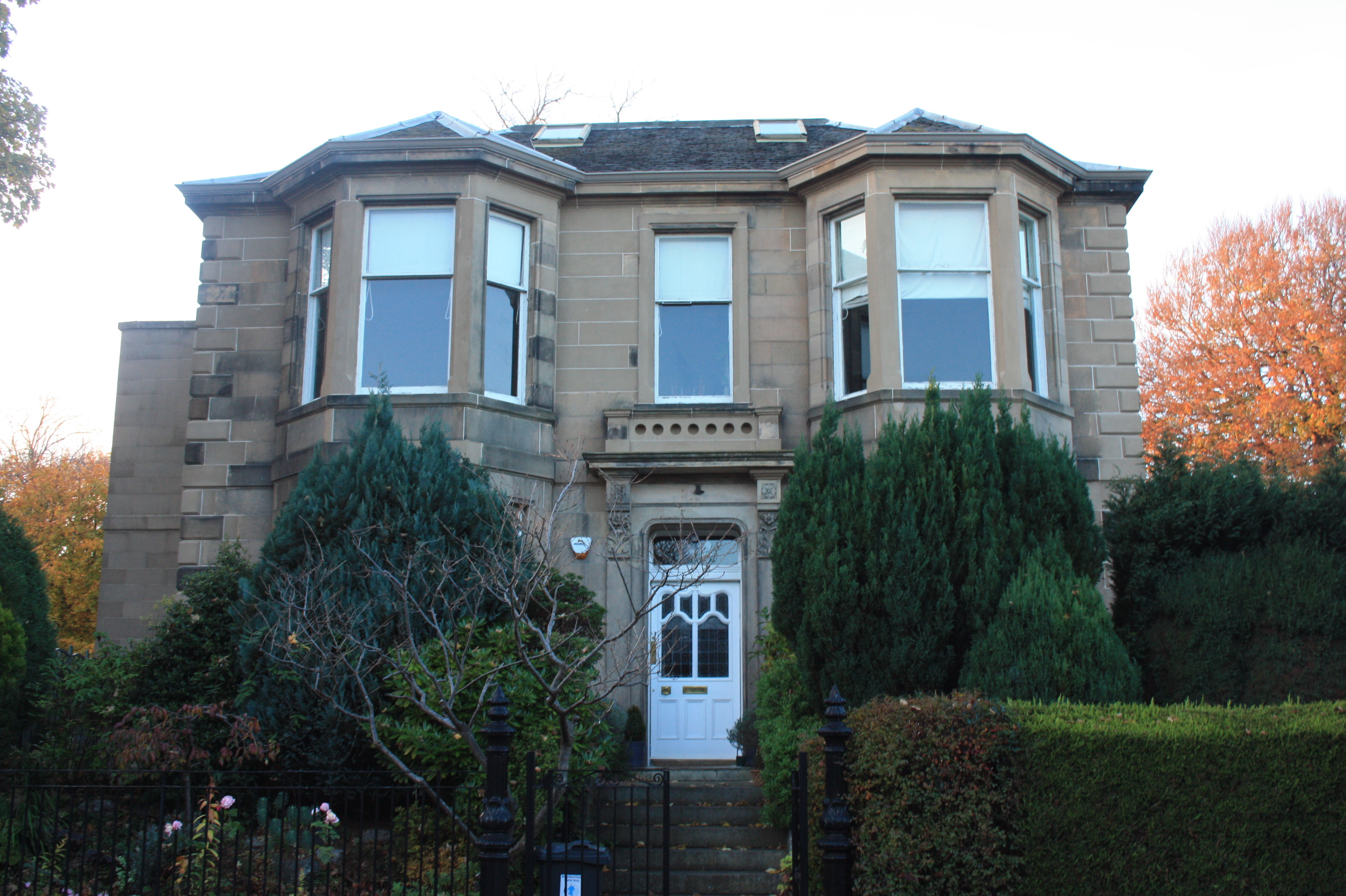
3 Belford Park, Edinburgh

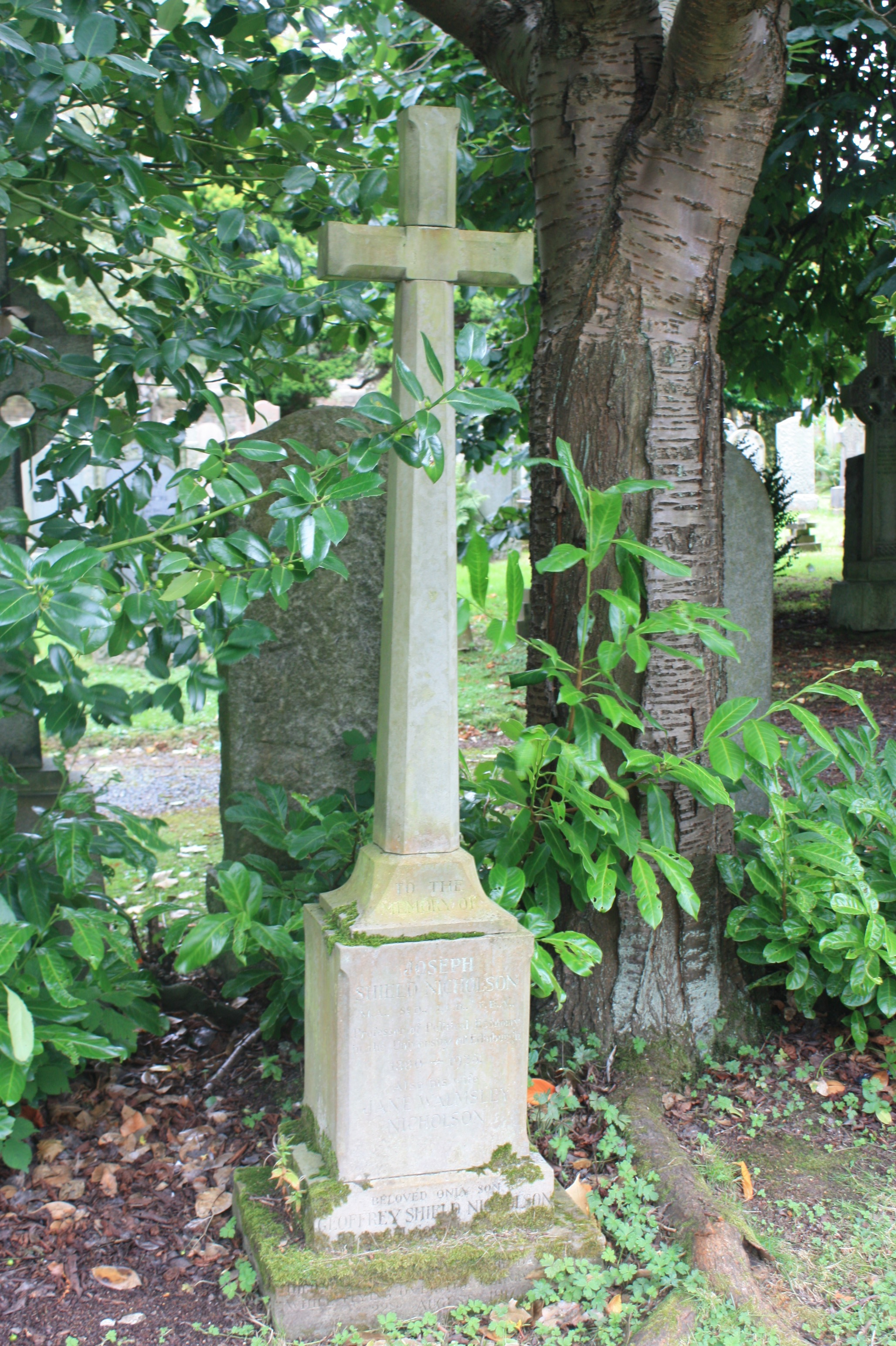
Grave of Joseph Shield Nicholson, Dean Cemetery

Joseph Shield Nicholson, FBA FRSE (9 November 1850 – 12 May 1927) was an English economist.

== Life ==
Nicholson was born in Wrawby in Lincolnshire on 9 November 1850 the only son of Mary Anne Grant and her husband Rev Thomas Nicholson, minister of Banbury. He was educated at Lewisham School in London.

Nicholson studied Logic and Metaphysics at King's College London and the University of Edinburgh, then studied Moral Philosophy at the University of Cambridge and Heidelberg University. He was a private tutor at Cambridge from 1876 to 1880 coming to fame in 1877 when he won the Cambridge Cobden Club prize for his essay "The Effects of Machinery on Wages".

In 1880 he became Professor of political economy at the University of Edinburgh. At this time he lived at 15 Jordan Lane in Morningside. He was the first President of the Scottish Society of Economists, serving from its creation in 1897 until 1903.

In 1884 he was elected a Fellow of the Royal Society of Edinburgh. His proposers were George Chrystal, Alexander Crum Brown, Alexander Buchan and Peter Guthrie Tait.

in 1918, he was awarded the Guy Medal in Silver by the Royal Statistical Society.

In later life he lived at 3 Belford Park near Dean Village in Edinburgh.

In 1925, Nicholson resigned his chair due to ill health and died in Edinburgh on 12 May 1927. He is buried with his wife, Jane (Jeannie) Walmsley Hodgson, in the 20th-century extension to Dean Cemetery, Edinburgh, in the central section.

== Works ==
Nicholson's writings represent a compromise between the methods of the historical school of German economics and those of the English deductive school. In his principal work, Principles of Political Economy (three volumes, 1893–1901), he closely follows John Stuart Mill in his selection of material, but employs statistical and historical discussion, instead of the abstract reasoning from simple assumption that characterises Mill's work.

Among his other writings are:
- Effects of Machinery on Wages (1878)
- Tenant's Gain not Landlord's Loss (1883)
- The Silver Question (1886)
- The Revival of Marxism (1920), final book.
- Money and Monetary Problems (1888)
- Historical Progress and Ideal Socialism (1894)
- Strikes and Social Problems (1896)
- Elements of Political Economy (1903)
- History of the English Corn Laws (1904)
- Rates and Taxes (1905)
- Rents, Wages, and Profits in Agriculture and Rural Depopulation (1906)
- A Project of Empire (1909)
- Tales from Ariosto (1913)
- Life and Genius of Ariosto (1914)
- War finance (1917)

Nicholson also wrote three romances:

- A Dreamer of Dreams (1889)
- Thoth (1888)
- Toxar (1890)
