= Kiwi Bus Builders =

New Zealand bus builder

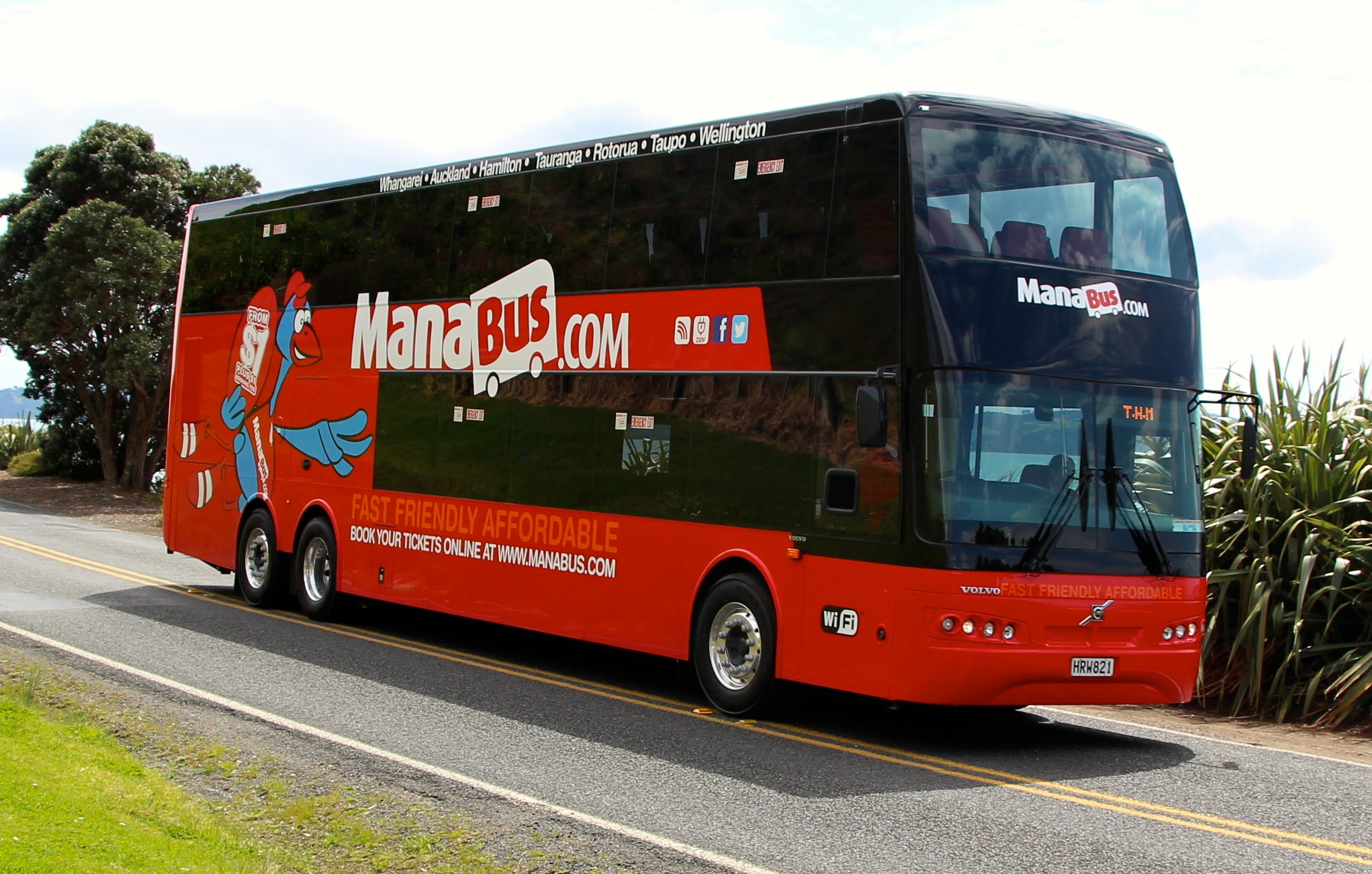
- ManaBus Volvo B11R
- Founded: 1993
- Headquarters: Tauranga
- Key people: Richard Drummond (MD)
- Products: Bus & coach bodies
- Website: https://www.kiwibus.co.nz

Kiwi Bus Builders is a New Zealand bus bodybuilder based in Tauranga.

== History ==
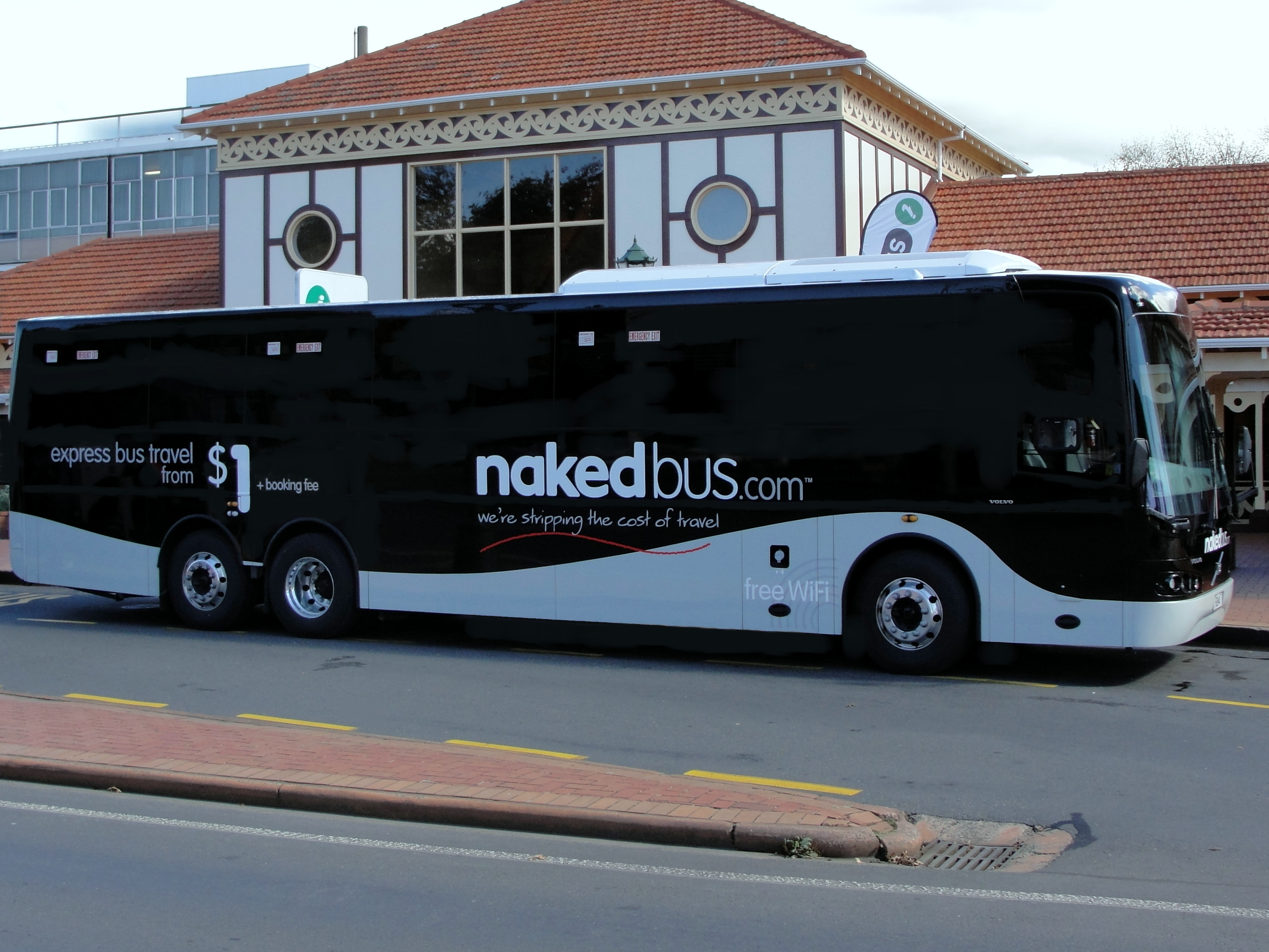
Kiwi Bus Builders-bodied Volvo B11R in Rotorua in April 2014, operating a Nakedbus service

Kiwi Bus Builders was established in 1993. It has built bus and coach bodies for many operators including Go Bus Transport, NZ Bus and Tranzit Coachlines.

In 2011, Kiwi Bus Builders entered an agreement with Alexander Dennis to assemble 120 Enviro200 buses for NZ Bus. This was followed by an order for a further 40.
