= Nakedbus.com =

Commercial intercity bus company in New Zealand

nakedbus.com

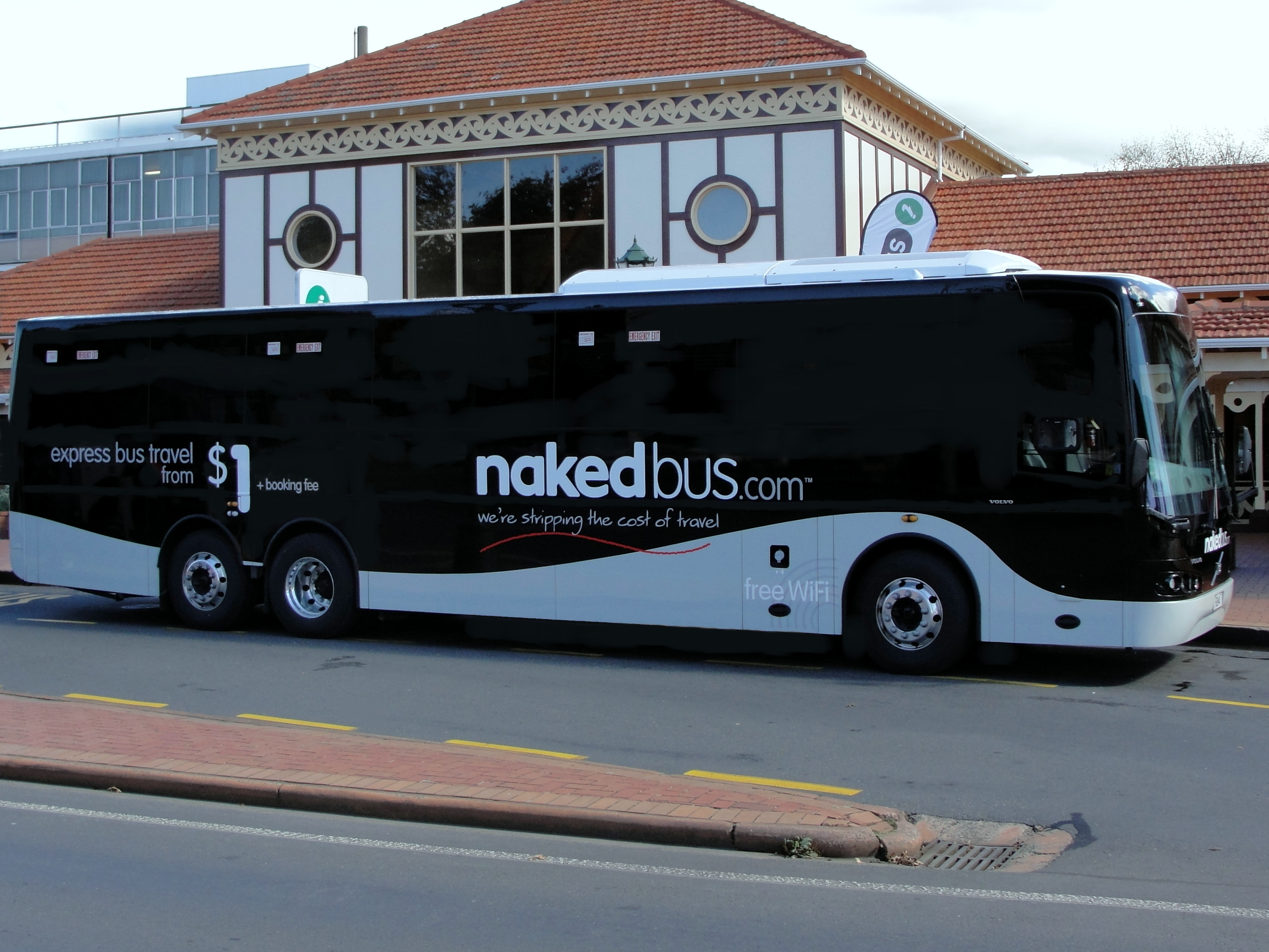
- Kiwi Bus Builders-bodied Volvo B11R in Rotorua in April 2014
- Parent: InMotion Group
- Founded: 2006
- Ceased operation: 15 July 2018
- Headquarters: Auckland
- Locale: New Zealand
- Service area: New Zealand
- Service type: Intercity bus service
- Chief executive: Sheryll Otway
- Website: nakedbus.com

nakedbus.com was a provider of low-cost long-distance bus (coachline) transport services around New Zealand. It used concepts such as yield management and no-frills to provide low fares. The company is so-named because "we have stripped out the costs that you don’t need." It is based on British online transport models such as EasyJet and Megabus.

Established in October 2006 with services out of Auckland around the North Island, nakedbus.com expanded to the South Island in February 2007.

The business was earlier owned by Hamish Nuttall and Pavlovich Services, and in May 2015 was taken over by ManaBus.com, part of Souter Holdings, owned by Brian Souter. In August 2015 both companies became part of Souter's InMotion Group of New Zealand bus and ferry companies.

ManaBus and Naked Bus ceased operation on 15 July 2018, with the bus fleets being sold to Ritchies Transport Holdings, part owner of rival coach company InterCity.

== Marketing techniques ==
The company provided at least one headline-grabbing NZ$1.00 fare on each service, while "the average fare is equal to 50 percent of the prevailing market fares and all fares beat standard market adult prices by at least 25 percent"

Nakedbus.com reduced overheads by encouraging online bookings but after its purchase by ManaBus.com, customers were able to contact the customer service team by email, Facebook Messenger or phone. Lost property enquiries were dealt with online using a contact form. "99%" of customers do not need to contact the company by phone. Nakedbus does not have terminals.

== Operations ==
nakedbus.com uses transport partners to provide transport throughout New Zealand.

- ManaBus.com: Long distance, city-to-city travel throughout the North Island
- Tairua: Local transport servicing the Coromandel
- InterCity: Local connection options in the North and long distance, city-to-city travel in the South Island

== Naked Passport ==
nakedbus.com offered a 'travel passport' for NZ bus travel. Customers could purchase a Naked Passport with 3, 5, 10, or 20 trips on it and then choose individual bus journeys throughout New Zealand.

== Nakedsleep.com ==
In December 2010 Nakedbus.com launched Nakedsleep.com, a website selling beds and rooms in backpacker hostels around New Zealand.
