= Alexander Cairncross (economist) =

British economist

Cairncross in 1963.

Sir Alexander Kirkland Cairncross KCMG FRSE FBA (11 February 1911 – 21 October 1998), known as Sir Alec Cairncross, was a British economist. He was the brother of the Soviet spy John Cairncross and father of journalist Frances Cairncross and public health engineer and epidemiologist Sandy Cairncross.

== Life ==
Cairncross was born in Lesmahagow, Lanarkshire, the seventh of eight children of Alexander Kirkland Cairncross, an ironmonger. He was educated at Lesmahagow Higher Grade School and Hamilton Academy, then won two scholarships to study economics at Glasgow University. From there, he attained a further research studentship to study at Trinity College, Cambridge, and in 1935 was awarded the second PhD in economics bestowed by the university (the first, according to Cairncross himself, was given to Ronald Walker).

Cairncross was instrumental in founding the Scottish Economic Society and was, in 1954, the first editor of its Scottish Journal of Political Economy. Cairncross served as an economic adviser to the UK government (1961–64), Head of the Government Economic Service (1964–69) and Master of St Peter's College, Oxford (1969–78), Chancellor of the University of Glasgow (1972–96), and was an Honorary Fellow of the Royal Society of Edinburgh. At Guildhall, Swansea he gave the Presidential Address as President of the British Association for 1970–1971. Cairncross was made a Fellow of the British Academy in 1961. Cairncross also received an Honorary Doctorate from Heriot-Watt University in 1969, and in 1992 was elected an Honorary Fellow of the Royal Society of Edinburgh.

In 1970 he was invited to deliver the MacMillan Memorial Lecture to the Institution of Engineers and Shipbuilders in Scotland. He chose the subject "Economic Growth".

== Recognition ==
The Scottish Economic Society instituted the Cairncross Prize in his memory.

== Family and death ==
Cairncross married Mary Frances Glynn in 1943; the couple had five children: two daughters and three sons. He died in Oxford on 21 October 1998.

== Publications ==
- Introduction to Economics (1944, 1st ed.; 1973, 5th ed.)
- Home and Foreign Investment, 1870-1913 (1953)
- Monetary Policy in a Mixed Economy (1960)
- Economic Development and the Atlantic Provinces (1961)
- Essays in Economic Management (1962)
- Control over Long-Term Capital Movements (1973)
- Britain's Economics Prospects Reconsidered, ed. (1971)
- Years of Recovery: British Economic Policy 1945-51 (1985)
- 'Goodbye, Great Britain': The 1976 IMF Crisis (1992) (with Kathleen Burk)
- The Heath Government and the British Economy (chapter in "The Heath Government 1970 - 74 : A Reappraisal", editors Stuart Ball and Anthony Selsdon) (1996)

Academic offices
Preceded by Lord Boyd-Orr	Chancellor of the University of Glasgow; 1972 to 1996	Succeeded by Sir William Kerr Fraser
