= Keep the Clause campaign =

British LGBTQ-related political campaign

Results
Choice	Votes	%
Yes	1,094,440	86.80%
No	166,406	13.20%
Valid votes	1,260,846	99.11%
Invalid or blank votes	11,356	0.89%
Total votes	1,272,202	100.00%
Registered voters/turnout	3,970,712	32.04%

Logo used by the Campaign.

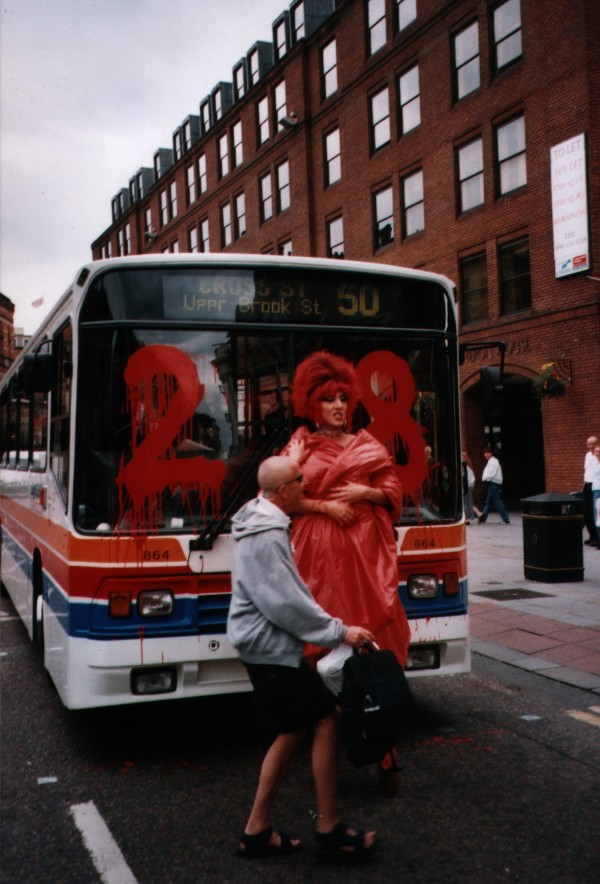
Section 28 protester with a Stagecoach Manchester bus in July 2000

The Keep the Clause campaign was a privately funded political campaign organised in 2000 with the aim of resisting the repeal of legislation known as Clause 28 of the Local Government Act 1988 in Scotland and the United Kingdom, which forbade local authorities to "intentionally promote homosexuality". (Clause 28 was known as Section 2A of the relevant Scottish legislation). The campaign involved the first privately funded referendum to take place across Scotland. The campaign was ultimately unsuccessful.

== Campaign ==
Most active between April and December 2000, the campaign coincided with the first legislative attempts to repeal the clause that began in February. A major part of the campaign was a private poll organised in Scotland, funded by Brian Souter , the Scottish co-founder of the Stagecoach Group, at the time the country's largest privately owned public transport company. Souter supported the poll to the tune of £1million

Amidst the campaign came the 2000 Ayr by-election. The Scottish parliament seat of Ayr shared its boundaries with the Westminster seat, which had until 1997 been held by the Conservatives for almost a hundred years. In the 1999 Scottish parliamentary election the seat had been the most marginal in Scotland, with Labour winning over the Conservatives by a mere 25 votes. The Keep the Clause Campaign sought to influence the outcome of the election, campaigning in the area and buying up billboard space. Souter later claimed to have successfully influenced the by-election, with the by-election being won by the Conservative candidate, who had opposed repeal of Section 28. Labour's George Foulkes attacked the Keep the Clause Campaign, claiming there had been a "distortion of democracy" and that the Keep the Clause Campaign had outspent all the candidates combined.

== Poll ==
The poll was a postal ballot directed at the 3.9 million people registered to vote in Scotland in 1999. The campaign group initially approached the Electoral Reform Society to organise the ballot through its ballot services subsidiary. The society refused the request as it believed the poll "would not be a legitimate democratic exercise to ask people to give an opinion on the repeal of Section 28 without knowing the detail of what would replace it".

From the 3,970,712 papers posted, 31.8% valid votes were returned with all votes counted by May 2000. The results showed that 86.8% of the returned ballots were in favour of keeping Section 28, and 13.2% in favour of repeal. Many groups hostile to the campaign had called for a public boycott of the poll. It was also estimated that the 1999 voters list could be 10-12% inaccurate, due to out of date information.

== Response ==
Mainstream politicians, including the Scottish National Party (which Souter has supported) largely ignored the poll result, and disputed whether it was a true reflection of public opinion. The then Communities Minister, Wendy Alexander MSP, criticised the poll stating "I think what is significant about today's ballot is that two out of three voters rejected, or binned or simply ignored this glorified opinion poll."
