= Liz Bacon =

Professor of computer science

Liz Bacon FRSE CEng CITP FBCS

Principal and Vice-Chancellor of Abertay University
- Incumbent
- Assumed office May 2022
- Preceded by: Nigel Seaton

Personal details
- Born: September 27, 1963 (age 62) Redhill, Surrey, England
- Education: Thames Polytechnic (BSc), University of Greenwich (PhD)
- Profession: Computer scientist, academic leader
- Awards: Fellow of the Royal Society of Edinburgh, National Teaching Fellow, Principal Fellow of the Higher Education Academy
- Website: www.abertay.ac.uk/staff-search/professor-liz-bacon/

Liz Bacon FRSE (born 27 September 1963) is a British computer scientist and academic leader. She is a Professor of Computer Science and currently serves as Principal and Vice-Chancellor of Abertay University in Dundee, Scotland. A Fellow of the Royal Society of Edinburgh, Chartered Engineer, Chartered IT Professional and Chartered Scientist; she is known for her work in artificial intelligence, technology-enhanced learning, and STEM diversity advocacy. Bacon has held prominent leadership roles, including past President of BCS, The Chartered Institute for IT, and was named one of the most influential women in UK IT.

== Early life and education ==
Bacon was born in Redhill, Surrey, and grew up in Kenley. She studied Computer science at Thames Polytechnic (now University of Greenwich), completing an industrial placement at CERN during her degree and graduating in 1986. She earned her PhD in Artificial intelligence from the University of Greenwich in 1993.

== Academic career ==
Before joining Abertay University, Bacon held senior roles at the University of Greenwich, including Professor of Software Engineering and Deputy Pro Vice-Chancellor. She joined Abertay in 2018 as a Professor of Computer Science and served as Deputy Principal and Deputy Vice-Chancellor until she was appointed Principal and Vice-Chancellor in May 2022.

== Professional leadership ==
Bacon is a past President of both:

- BCS, The Chartered Institute for IT (2014–2015)
- EQANIE, the European Quality Assurance Network for Informatics Education

She was the inaugural Chair of the BCS Academy of Computing and chaired the Council of Professors and Heads of Computing (CPHC). She has served as a Trustee and Director of Bletchley Park Trust, and currently sits on the Board of V&A Dundee and JISC’s Audit and Risk Committee.

== Honors and recognition ==
- Fellow of the Royal Society of Edinburgh (FRSE) (2023)
- Principal Fellow of the Higher Education Academy (PFHEA)
- National Teaching Fellow (NTF)
- Named 35th Most Influential Woman in UK IT by Computer Weekly (2015)
- Fellowships: FBCS, FIScT, and professional membership of ACM
- Winner of the Services to Science & Technology Award at the Scottish Women’s Awards (2023)

== Advocacy and outreach ==
Bacon is an advocate for digital education, the societal impact of AI, and diversity in STEM. During her BCS presidency, she founded STELLAR, a senior women’s network aimed at increasing female participation in STEM careers.

== Research impact ==
Bacon’s research has significantly influenced the fields of technology-enhanced learning, artificial intelligence, and computer science education. Her work has focused on developing immersive learning environments and applying AI to improve educational outcomes, particularly in areas such as crisis management, eHealth, and serious games. She has coordinated multiple European Commission-funded projects under FP7 and Horizon 2020, contributing to international standards for computing education and quality assurance. Bacon has published extensively, and is frequently invited to speak worldwide on topics including digital education, the impact of AI, and diversity in STEM.

== Selected publications ==
- Bacon, L. et al. Technology-enhanced learning for crisis management (various EU FP7/H2020 projects)
- Bacon, L. AI and Higher Education: Opportunities and Challenges
