= Gavin Clydesdale Reid =

Scottish economist (born 1946)

Gavin Clydesdale Reid FRSA
- Born: 25 August 1946 (age 80); Glasgow, Scotland
- Occupation: Economist

Academic background
- Education: University of Aberdeen; University of Southampton; University of Edinburgh

Gavin Clydesdale Reid is a Scottish economist and past President of the Scottish Economic Society (1999–2002). He was Head of Dundee Business School Abertay University (until 2018) and was Founding Director of the Centre for Research into Industry, Enterprise, Finance and the Firm (CRIEFF) in the School of Economics & Finance at the University of St Andrews. He is currently an honorary professor in the School of Economics & Finance at St Andrews University.

== Background ==
He is a graduate of the Universities of Aberdeen, Southampton and Edinburgh. His approach is heavily grounded by fieldwork in the business enterprise, and he favours an interdisciplinary approach to the study of a firm, combining economics with accounting and finance.

In 2014 he became Head of Dundee Business School Abertay University.

He is a member of the Competition Appeal Tribunal.

== Publications ==
His book Small Business Enterprise (1993), uses econometric analysis to examine a body of small firms, and is one of several that have been favourably reviewed. He has written and presented research papers,

In 2008 he was involved with work on strategies for the growth and performance of high-technology firms

One of his books, The Foundations of Small Business Enterprise, was published by Routledge in 2007
