= Scottish Economic Society =

- Abbreviation: SES
- Formation: 29 June 1897 (as Scottish Society of Economists), 1954 (as Scottish Economic Society)
- Type: Learned society
- Honorary President: Anne Gasteen
- Website: www.scotecon.org
- Formerly called: Scottish Society of Economists

The Scottish Economic Society (SES), known up to 1953 as the Scottish Society of Economists, is a scholarly society "promoting the study and teaching of economics." It is registered as a charity in Scotland (number SCO 21757).

== Aims and activities ==
The Society has published an academic journal, the Scottish Journal of Political Economy, since March 1954. It also organises an annual conference and other events.

The stated objects of the society are:

- "to advance the study of economic and social problems on the widest basis, in accordance with the Scottish tradition of political economy inspired by Adam Smith"
- "to provide a forum for the discussion of Scottish economic and social problems and their relationship to the political and social life of Scotland."

The current President-Elect of the SES is Prof. Sarah Brown of University of Sheffield.

== History ==
The Scottish Society of Economists was formed in 1897, its first president being Joseph Shield Nicholson of the University of Edinburgh. Despite the society's title, its 108 initial members came from a variety of professions. However, it was a purely male membership until four women joined in 1905. Nicholson set out his ambitions for the society: that it would be above all scientific, not campaigning for any specific reforms or a vehicle for propaganda. He made it a principle that debate would not be settled by voting. He was president of the society until 1903, and remained very involved until his death in 1927, after which the society's activity declined. By 1953, the society had not met for twenty years.

In 1954 the society was re-established under a new name, chosen to be less exclusive. Economists from the (then) four Scottish universities and the Dundee School of Economics met in Edinburgh where a constitution, drawn up by Fraser Noble, was agreed. The new president, Alexander Cairncross, urged social scientists of all kinds to join, arguing that economics on its own is "emasculated". Membership reached 300 by the end of the 1950s, but declined during the 1970s to below 200.

In its early years, the emphasis of the reformed society, reflected in the content of its journal, was on Scottish issues, applications of economics, and writing for a non-professional audience. From the 1950s to the 1990s, the emphasis changed and became more technical, focusing less on Scottish issues and applied economics but attracting far more international contributions and recognition.

== See also ==
- Gavin Clydesdale Reid
- Royal Economic Society
