= Tranzit Group =

Company that operates buses in New Zealand

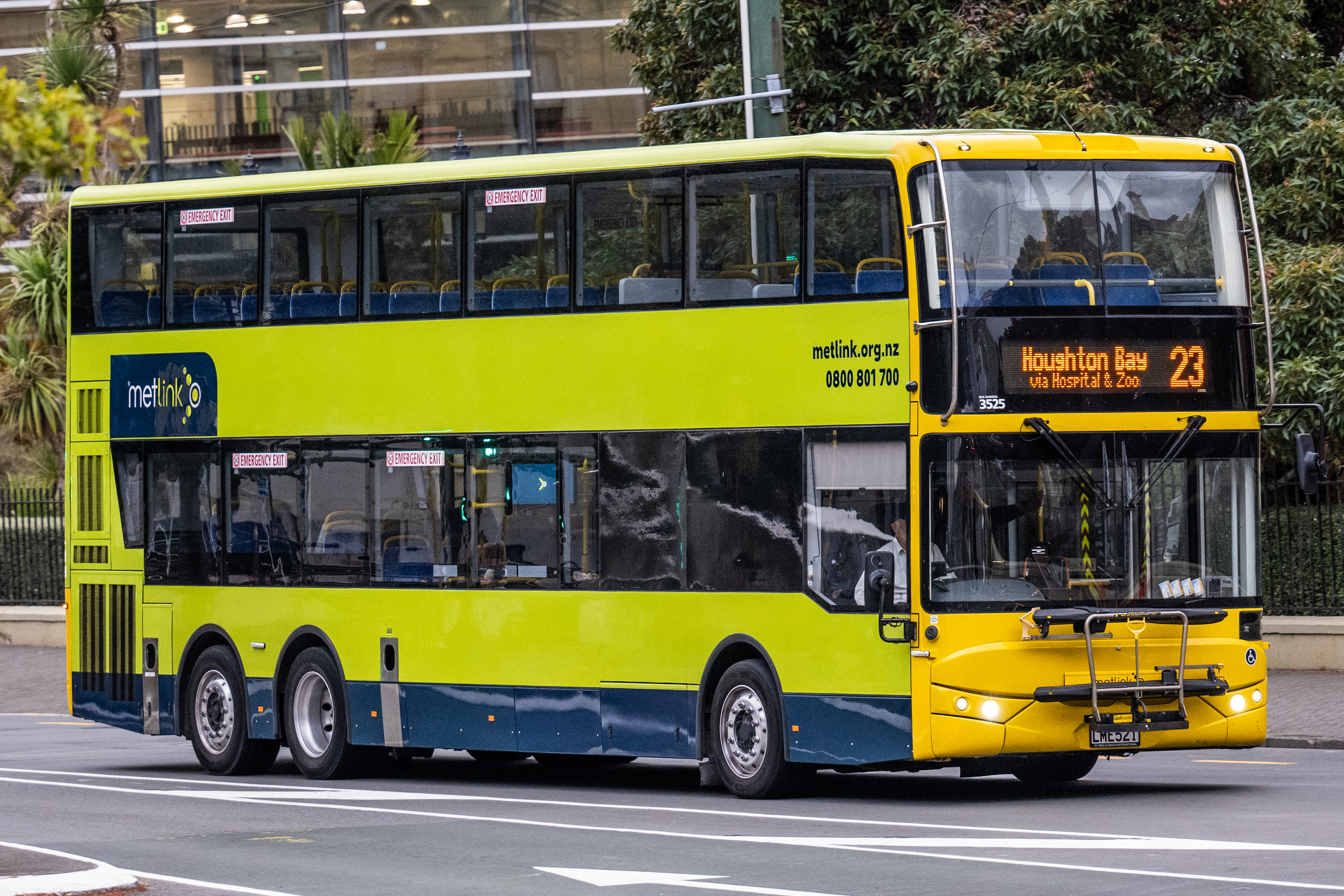
- Tranzurban Wellington BCI CitiRider in February 2024
- Parent: Snelgrove family
- Commenced operation: 1925
- Headquarters: Masterton, Wairarapa
- Service area: New Zealand
- Depots: 15
- Fleet: 3000 (August 2026)
- Operator: Cross Country Rentals; Hammonds Wellington Tours; Hawke's Bay Peugeot, Suzuki & Citroën; InterCity (46%); Pacific Tourways Auckland; Tranzit Coachlines; Tranzit InterCity; Tranzit Tours; Tranzurban Wellington; Tranzurban Auckland
- Website: www.tranzit.co.nz

The Tranzit Group is a New Zealand, family-owned transport and tourism company that operates buses nationally. It was founded by Albert Snelgrove in Wairarapa as Grey Bus Service. It became Blue Bus Service (with a livery change) in the early 1950s and then Tranzit Group in 1984 to reflect expansion into transport and tourism. Today, Tranzit Group is behind brands including Tranzit Coachlines, Tranzit InterCity, Tranzit Tours, Pacific Tourways (Auckland), Royale Coachlines, Tranzurban, Cross Country Rentals, Maugers, Right Price Rentals and Bus Travel NZ Ltd. It has a 50% shareholding in Entrada Travel Group incorporating GreatSights, Gray Line, AwesomeNZ, Greyhound Australia, InterCity, Tusa Dive and Divers Den in Australia.InterCity.

== Urban services ==
Tranzit operates urban bus services in Auckland, New Plymouth, Waikato, Whanganui, Palmerston North, Wairarapa, Wellington and Hutt Valley. In 2018 under the brand name Tranzurban, it began operating 60 percent of the Metlink bus network under contract to Greater Wellington Regional Council. This includes delivering urban services in Wairarapa, Hutt Valley and Wellington city. At that time, Tranzurban purchased 225 Euro 6 diesel buses, which meet the highest global emission standards, and 10 double deck electric (EVDD) buses, the first in the Southern Hemisphere. This fleet has been running successfully since, with innovations made to the EVDDs. This fleet has incrementally grown to include 42 electric buses to help Wellington achieve its target of carbon neutrality by 2030. Between 2021 and 2024, Tranzit Group's workshop and fleet team successfully converted two diesel buses to electric. The first was a Southern Hemisphere innovation in that a double decker diesel was converted to electric in Masterton, followed by a single deck conversion. Both buses contniue to transport passengers on public transport networks in Auckland and Wellington.

As part of a reorganisation of Auckland's northern bus network on the North Shore, "Tranzurban Auckland" became the contracted operator of the newly designated NX2 services (formerly the 881 route) on the Northern Busway from 30 September 2018. Tranzurban also is contracted to deliver WX1 services for AT.

== Fleet ==
As of 2026, Tranzit Group operates more than 3000 vehicles nationwide, including a growing fleet of electric buses. These vehicles represent some of New Zealand's most well known travel and transport brands owned by Tranzit Group including: Cross Country Rentals, Tranzit Coachlines, Tranzit Tours, Pacific Tourways Limited, Tranzurban Wellington, Hutt Valley & Auckland, Rite Price Rentals and Maugers Rentals. Tranzit Group is also part owner of Intercity. For the Wellington contract, 114 Optare MetroCitys will be purchased.

In Wellington, the company operates 43 electric double decker buses on urban routes. They have also introduced 100% electric bus fleet into Palmerston North in early 2024 in partnership with Horizons Regional Council An additional 31 double deck electric buses are expected to be in service by 2022.
