= PolskiBus.com =

Polish express coach operator

Coordinates: 52.1836°N 21.0211°E

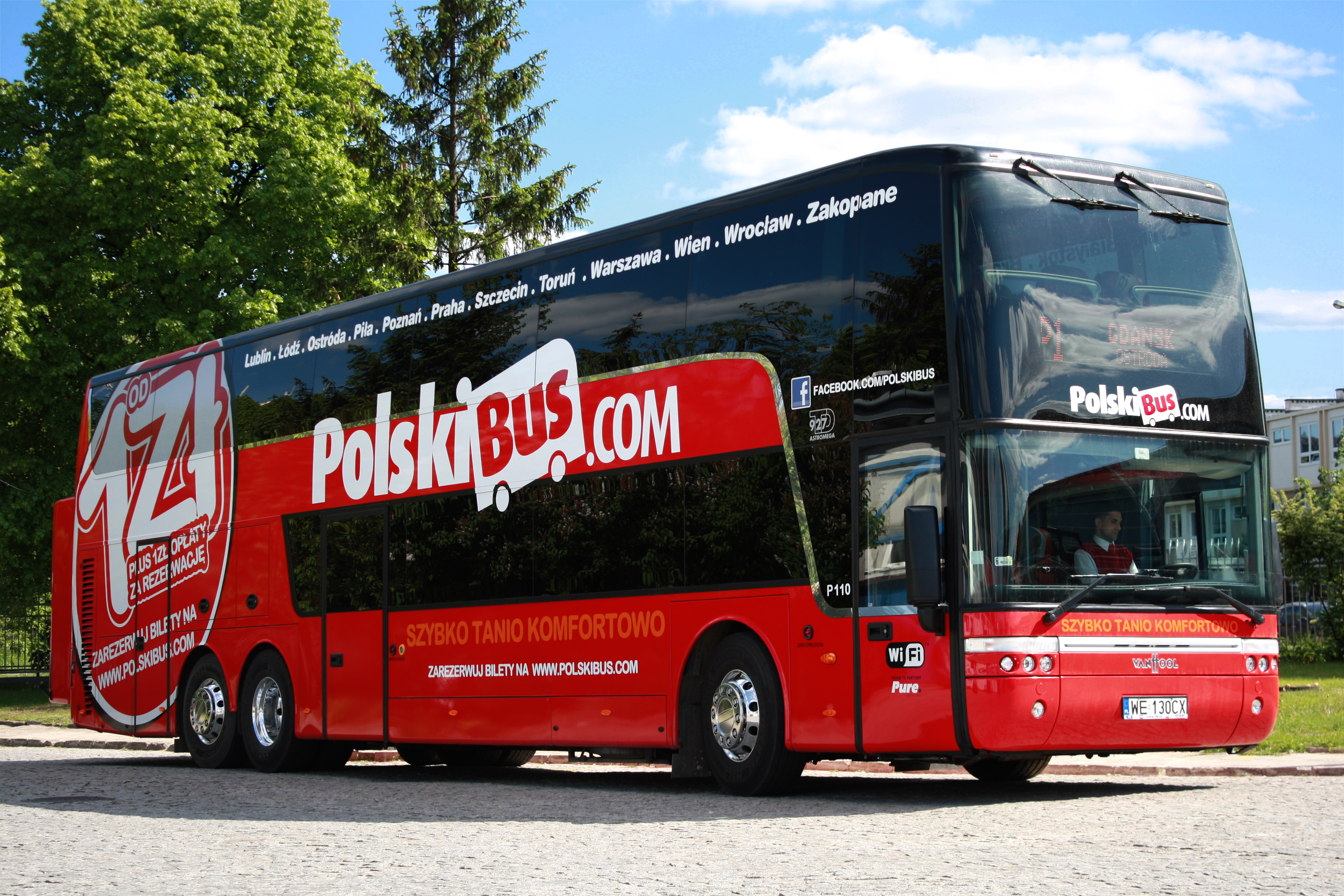
- Van Hool Astromega TD927 in May 2012
- Parent: Highland Global Transport
- Commenced operation: June 2011
- Ceased operation: February 2018
- Service area: Poland
- Service type: Express coach operator
- Routes: 19
- Hubs: Warsaw, Wrocław
- Fleet: 132 (August 2014)
- Website: polskibus.com

PolskiBus.com was a Polish express coach operator. Owned by Brian Souter's Highland Global Transport, it commenced operating in June 2011. It was sold to Flixbus in December 2017 with the PolskiBus brand retired in February 2018.

== Services ==
PolskiBus commenced operating in June 2011 operating eight routes with 18 coaches. As of March 2017 it operated services on 16 routes within Poland (establishing connection between 26 Polish cities) and additionally 8 international destinations including Berlin, Bratislava, Budapest, Prague, Vienna, and Vilnius.

Advertised fares started at zł 1 plus zł 1 booking fee, using a yield management model as employed by Megabus.

In 2018, PolskiBus merged with Flixbus which took over PolskiBus' routes in Poland and around.

== Fleet ==
The company began operations with a fleet of 18 Van Hool Altano TD921 coaches. It later expanded with Van Hool Astromega TD927s and Plaxton Elite i bodied Volvo B11Rs.
