= Big Bus Sydney =

Australian sightseeing bus service

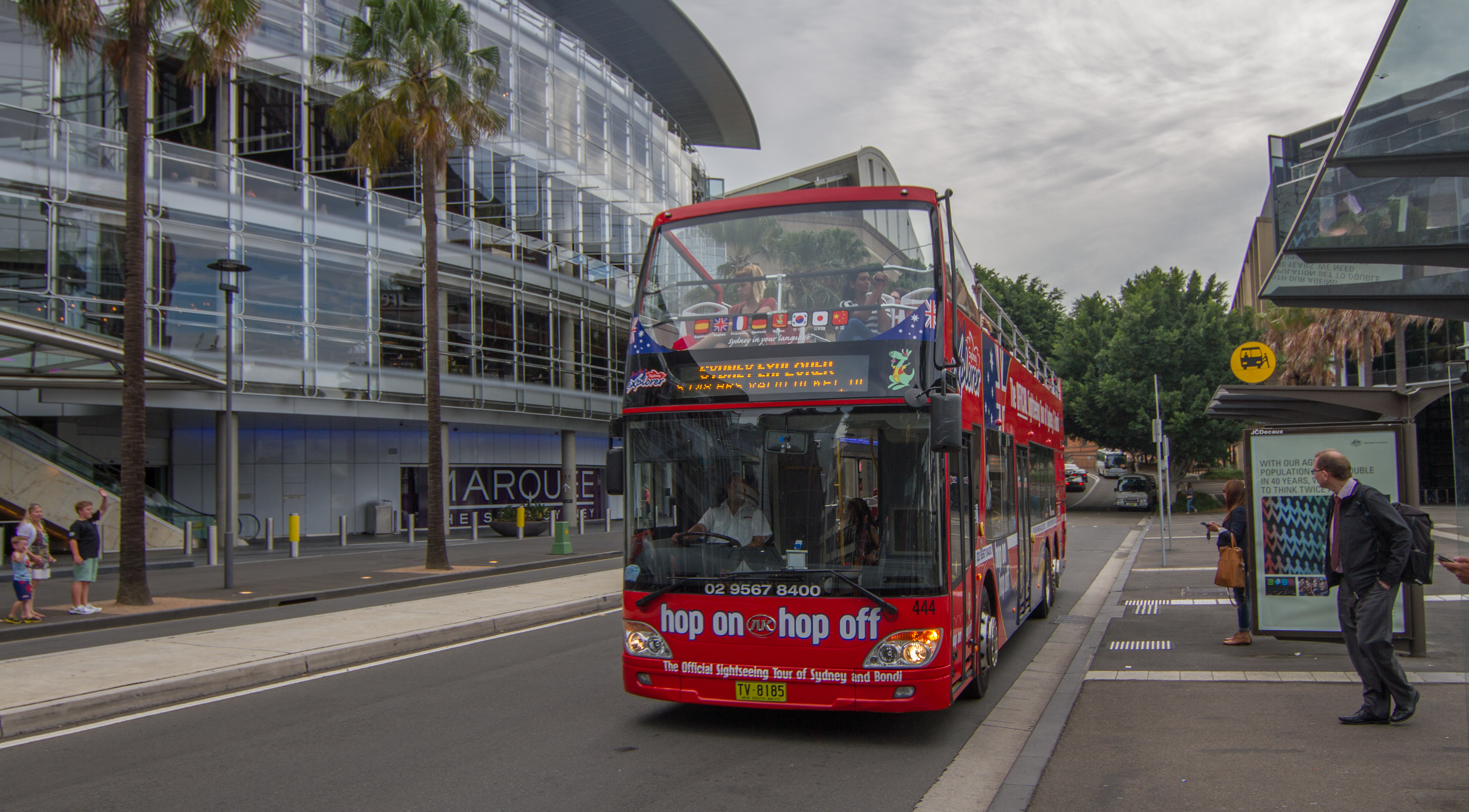

Overview
- Operator: City Sightseeing
- Began service: 23 November 1980
- Ended service: 2016
- Former operator(s): State Transit Authority; Urban Transit Authority

Route
- Locale: Sydney
- Start: Circular Quay
- Via: Sydney central business district Sydney Harbour Bridge
- End: Circular Quay

Big Bus Sydney, previously Sydney Explorer, is a hop-on hop-off sightseeing bus tour in Sydney, Australia.

== History ==
On 23 November 1980, the Urban Transit Authority commenced operating the Sydney Explorer looping the Sydney central business district in partnership with Department of Tourism. It was numbered 111.

The initial 17 kilometre route had 20 stops running from Circular Quay via the Opera House, Royal Botanic Garden, Sydney Hospital, Mrs Macquarie's Chair, Art Gallery, Kings Cross, Elizabeth Bay House, the Australian Museum, Central station, George Street and The Rocks.

From May 1982 it was diverted to operate via Pier One at Dawes Point. In September 1991, the route was extended across the Harbour Bridge to McMahons Point. From September 1992 it was altered to operate over the Harbour Bridge in the northbound direction, and via the Sydney Harbour Tunnel southbound.

In June 1993, it was altered to operate via the Sydney Aquarium and Wynyard Park in lieu of Pier One. On the same date, it resumed travelling across the Harbour Bridge in both directions, but to Milsons Point in lieu of McMahons Point. In 2002 it ceased to operate via Elizabeth Bay after the installation of speed bumps in Greenknowe Avenue that buses were unable to travel over.

In November 2010, the Sydney Explorer service was sold by State Transit to City Sightseeing who had been operating open top bus tours in Sydney since the early 2000s.

No buses were included in the sale, with City Sightseeing continuing to operate its existing routes only with its fleet of MCW Metrobuses. From May 2012 new Anhui Ankai buses were introduced on these routes. Operations initially operated under the City Sightseeing brand, before the Big Bus name was introduced in 2016 and the Sydney Explorer brand retired.

== Vehicles ==
The Sydney Explorer was initially operated by a fleet of five Pressed Metal Corporation bodies Mercedes-Benz O305s out of Randwick Bus Depot. These were replaced by four new O305s in 1985 which were replaced by six Mercedes-Benz O405s in 1990. The first two fleets, apart from being painted in red Sydney Explorer livery and having a public address system, were identical to those used in normal service. The last fleet were fitted out with coach seating.
