= Open top buses in the United Kingdom =

Buses for sightseeing and seasonal summer services

Open top buses are used in the United Kingdom for sightseeing and seasonal summer services.

== History ==
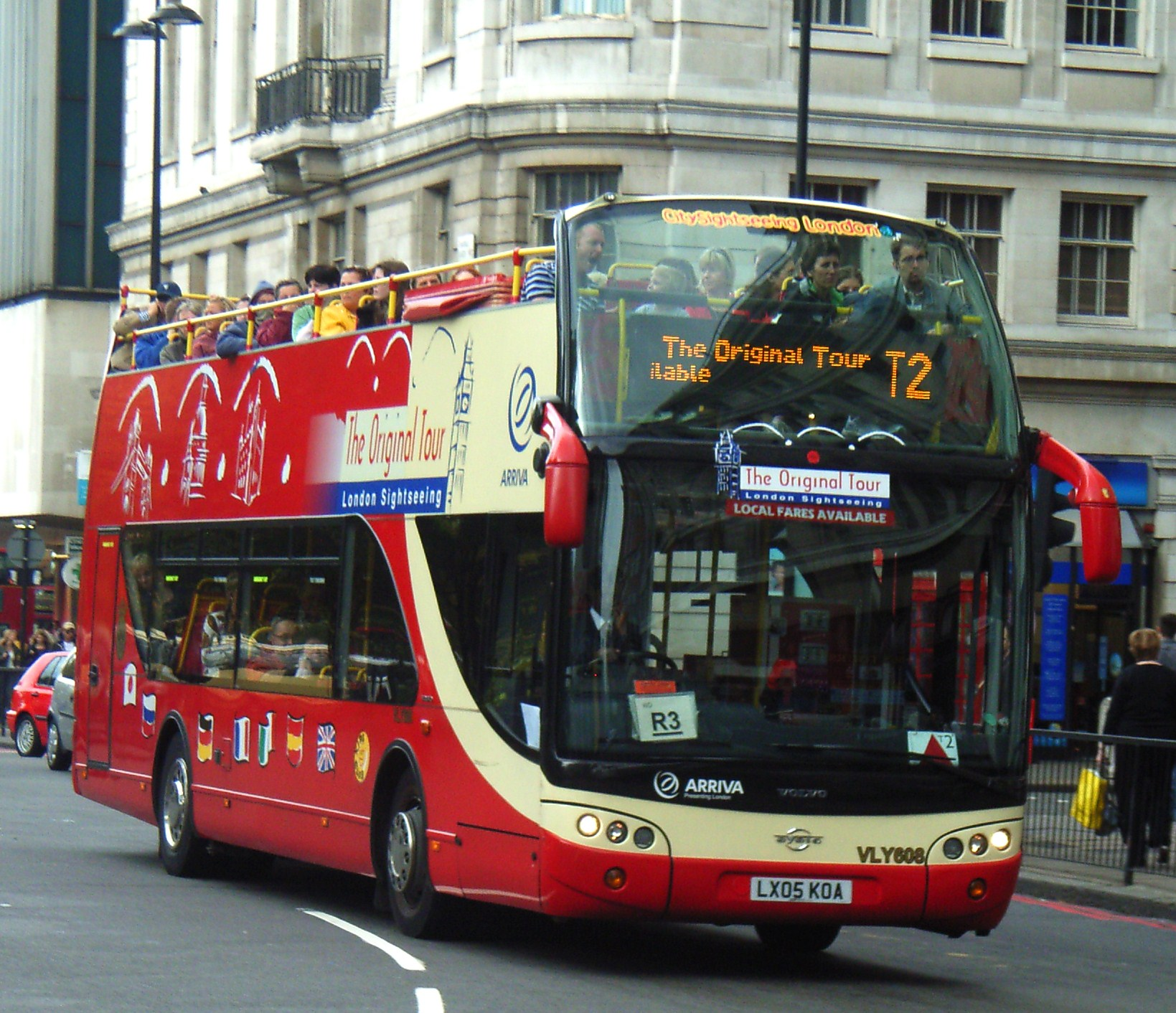
The Original Tour Ayats Bravo City bodied Volvo B7L in October 2007

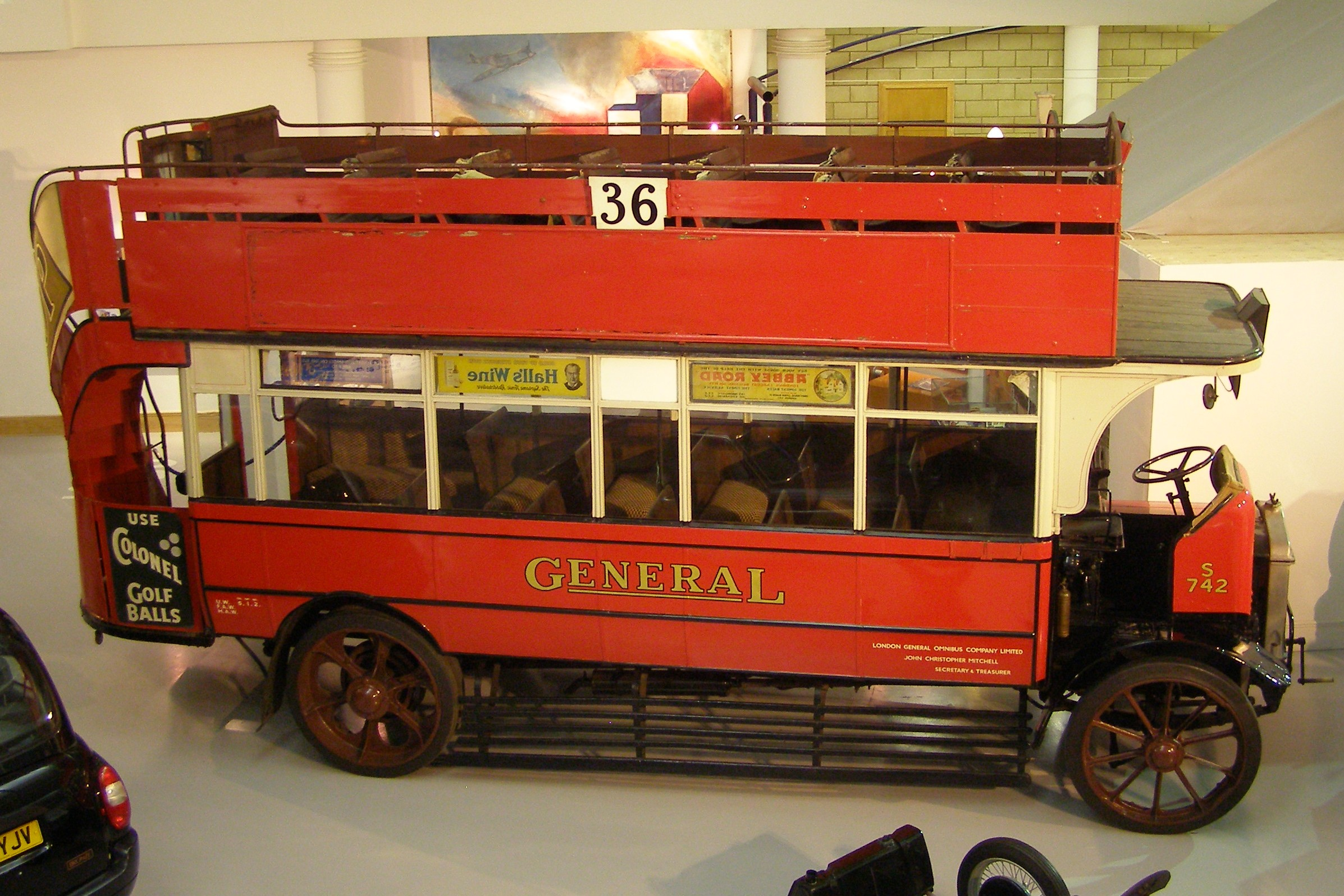
A 1921 AEC S-type Bus open top bus of London General on display at the British Motor Museum

The first open top buses in the United Kingdom were regular double deck buses, but these were later replaced by buses with enclosed top decks.

One of the first operators to provide open top buses for its seaside routes was Brighton, Hove & District in 1936. While most operators rebuilt old vehicles for such services, Maidstone & District Motor Services purchased six new Leyland Tiran TD5s with open top bodies built by Weymann in 1939. World War II saw an end to leisure services for a while, for example it was 1949 before open top services resumed at Southend-on-Sea. As new buses became available for regular services more companies introduced new open top services using old buses with their roofs cut off, such as at the Bristol Omnibus Company at Weston-super-Mare in 1950 and Devon General at Torquay in 1955.

Longer-established routes were by now using convertible buses. These were buses that had detachable roofs so they could be operated as open top during the summer but as conventional buses at other times. By 1951 Brighton was operating ten permanent open top buses and eight convertibles. At Torquay nine Leyland Atlanteans with convertible Metro-Cammell bodies were placed into service in 1961. These were named after historic seafarers and known as 'Sea Dogs'. Weston-super-Mare received four Bristol FSs with convertible Eastern Coach Works bodies in 1961.

The National Bus Company ordered a new generation of convertibles for most of its seaside fleets in 1978. These were Bristol VRTs with Eastern Coach Works bodies. Unlike older buses they did not need a conductor as the driver could collect fares and issue tickets. They were initially allocated to Devon General, Western National, Southdown and Hants & Dorset, although they were later spread across a larger number of operators. Bristol Omnibus kept its older crew-operated buses at Weston-super-Mare until 1982. Various second-hand buses had their roofs removed to replace them in 1982 but two years later six new Leyland Olympians with convertible Charles H. Roe bodywork were purchased as replacements.

It was nearly twenty years before further open top buses came into production in the United Kingdom. In 1998 six Volvo B10Ms bodied by East Lancashire Coachbuilders for a city tour in Paris, France, but new vehicles for British operators soon followed. These included Lothian Buses who received four permanent open top Alexander ALX300 bodies on Dennis Trident chassis in 2000 and Yellow Buses in Bournemouth who purchased three Volvo B7TLs with convertible East Lancashire Coachbuilders bodies.

City tours started to become popular during the 1970s. London Transport purchased seven convertible Daimler Fleetlines from Bournemouth in October 1977 which were placed on a London sightseeing tour. While some city tours were operated just a couple of times each day by one vehicle, the more popular cities saw intense competition, especially after bus services were deregulated in 1986. Badgerline in Bath was carrying up to 150,000 passengers annually but rival tours have been operated by the Bath Bus Company since 1997 and Ryan’s Coaches 'City Tour' and Regency Tours offered further competition.

=== London ===
In January 1986 London Transport revamped its sightseeing division and launched the Original London Transport Sightseeing Tour brand, to operate a fleet of 50 modified open and closed topped AEC Routemaster buses, on sightseeing tours of London. In May 1992 London Coaches was privatised in a management buyout. In December 1997, it was sold to Arriva and renamed The Original Tour.

The other major London operators are The Big Bus Company that commenced in June 1991 and Golden Tours that commenced in 2012.

== Services ==
=== Stage carriage services ===
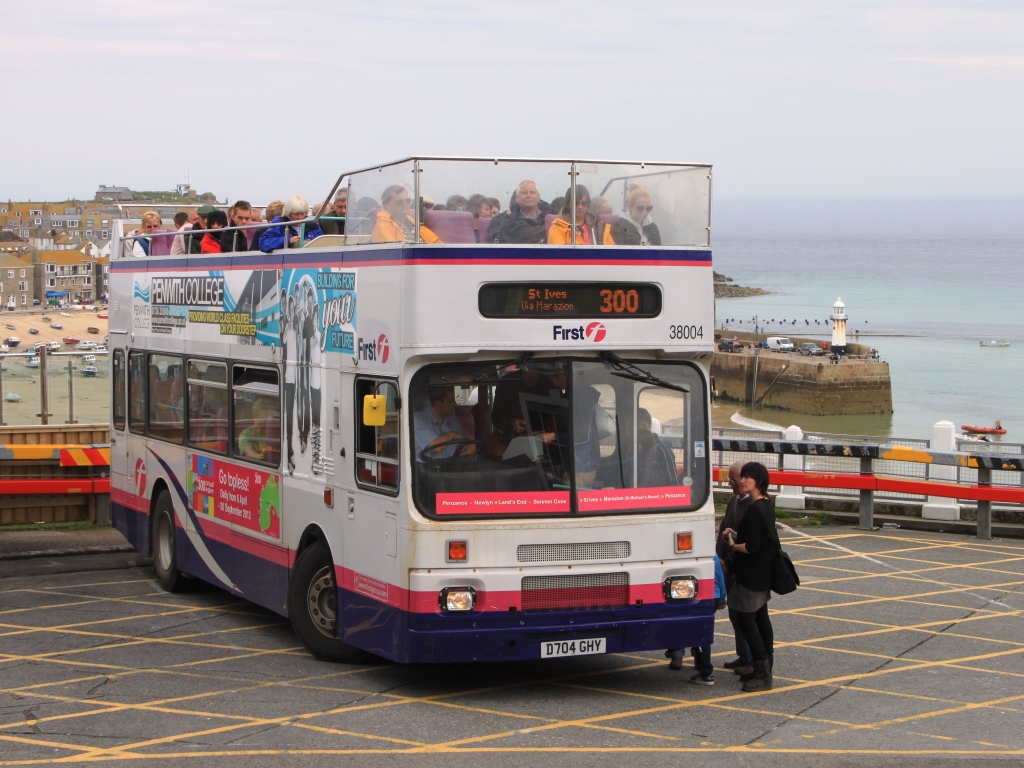
Cornwall route 300 (now A1) bus at St Ives bus station which overlooks the beaches and harbour

Stage carriage services are operated to a published timetable. The operator's standard ticketing arrangements apply, including the use of day or season tickets if appropriate. Some of the services listed here also have some of the characteristics of the open top tours listed below, such as circular routes or publicity that describes the route for tourists. They would not normally carry guides or have recorded commentaries.

Some routes operate all year round, but not necessarily with open top buses. Some services have a mixture of open and closed buses. Many of the routes only operate during the warmer months of the year.

=== Open top tour operators ===
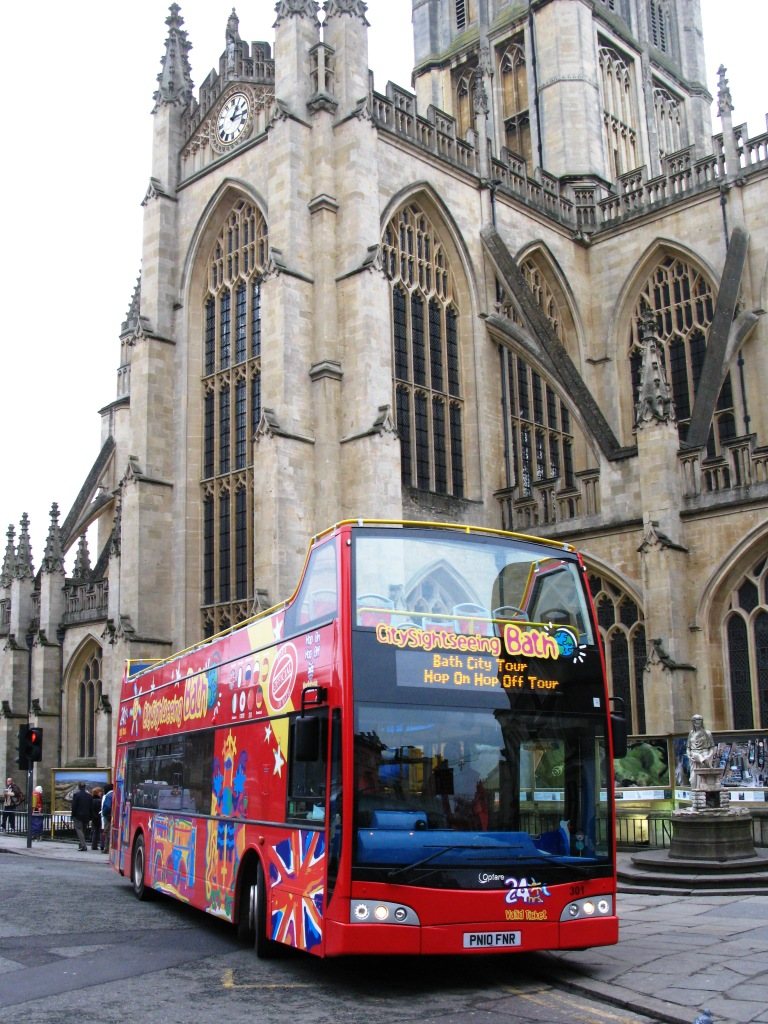
City Sightseeing tour bus in Bath, Somerset, an Optare Visionaire with Volvo chassis operated by the Bath Bus Company (outside Bath Abbey, December 2010)

Nearly all major cities in the United Kingdom are served by tour bus services, most using open top buses. Other picturesque rural areas and monuments are also served by open top tours, such as Stonehenge and the New Forest.

Tour buses often charge a premium fare and carry either a tour guide or offer a recorded commentary. They are usually circular routes and generally offer a 'hop-on hop-off' ticket that allows multiple journeys during a specified period.

Companies who operate such tours include:

- Stagecoach Cumbria and North Lancashire (Lake District)
- Stagecoach Yorkshire (Peak District)
- Bath Bus Company (Bath, Bristol, Cardiff)
- Big Bus Tours (London)
- City Sightseeing (many locations franchised to local bus operators)
- Golden Tours (London)
- London Pride Sightseeing
- Lothian Buses (Edinburgh)
- Morebus (New Forest Tour)
- The Original Tour (RATP Group) (London)
- York Pullman

=== Private hire ===
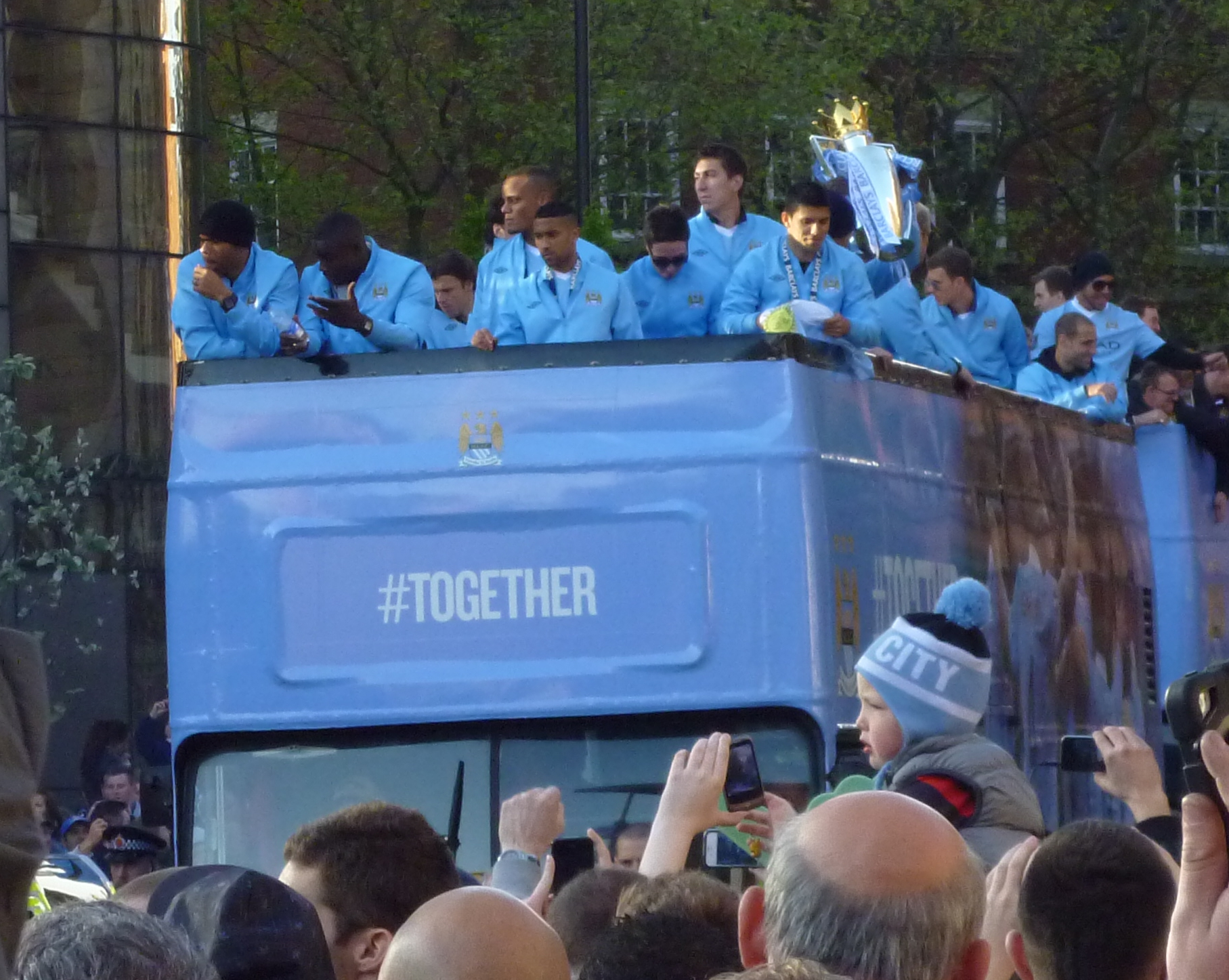
An open top victory parade for Manchester City in May 2012

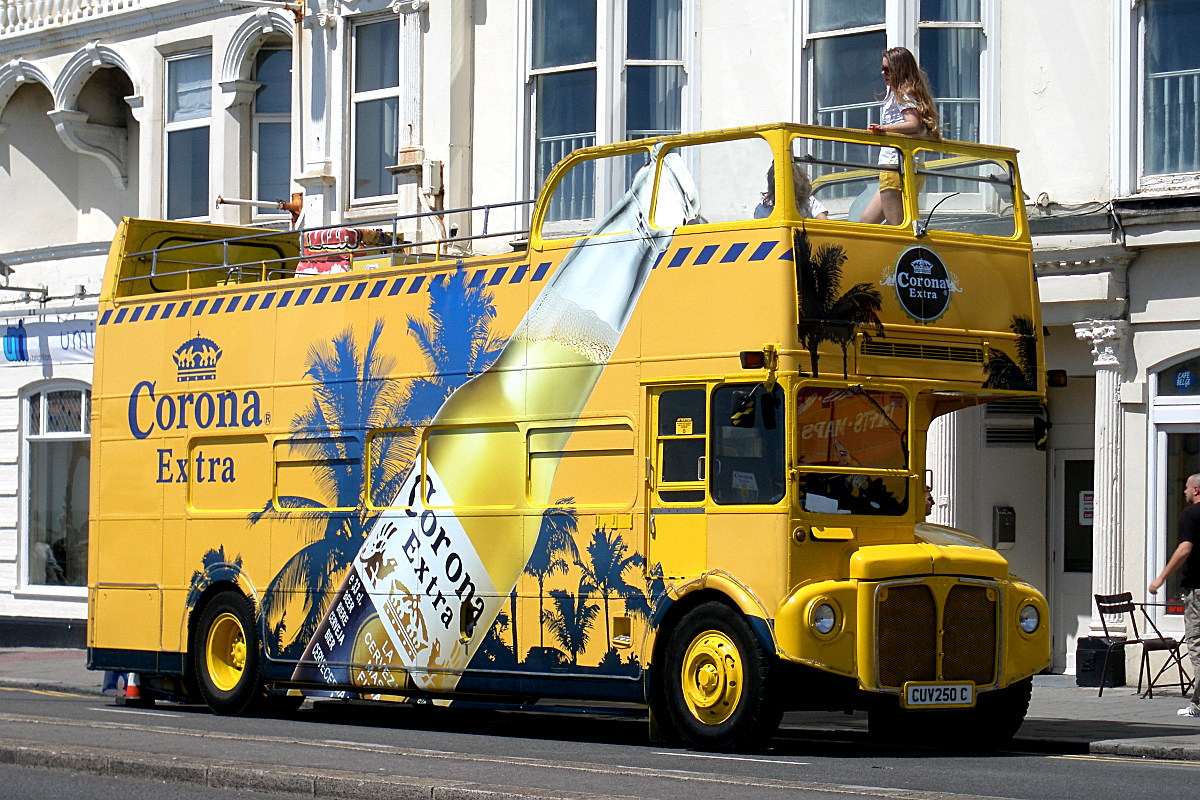
AEC Routemaster in promotional livery for Corona in July 2008

Open top buses are also often used in the UK for victory parades for sport teams, such as the Premier League champions, the England cricket team's victory in The Ashes.

Open top buses also see regular use as temporary viewing platforms at events such as The Derby or for promotional reasons. Private hire is sometimes employed for occasions such as weddings, using the large number of preserved vehicles in the UK.

== See also ==
- Open top buses in Torbay
- Open top buses in Weston-super-Mare
- Tourism in the United Kingdom
