= City Sightseeing Cape Town =

Bus tour operator in Cape Town

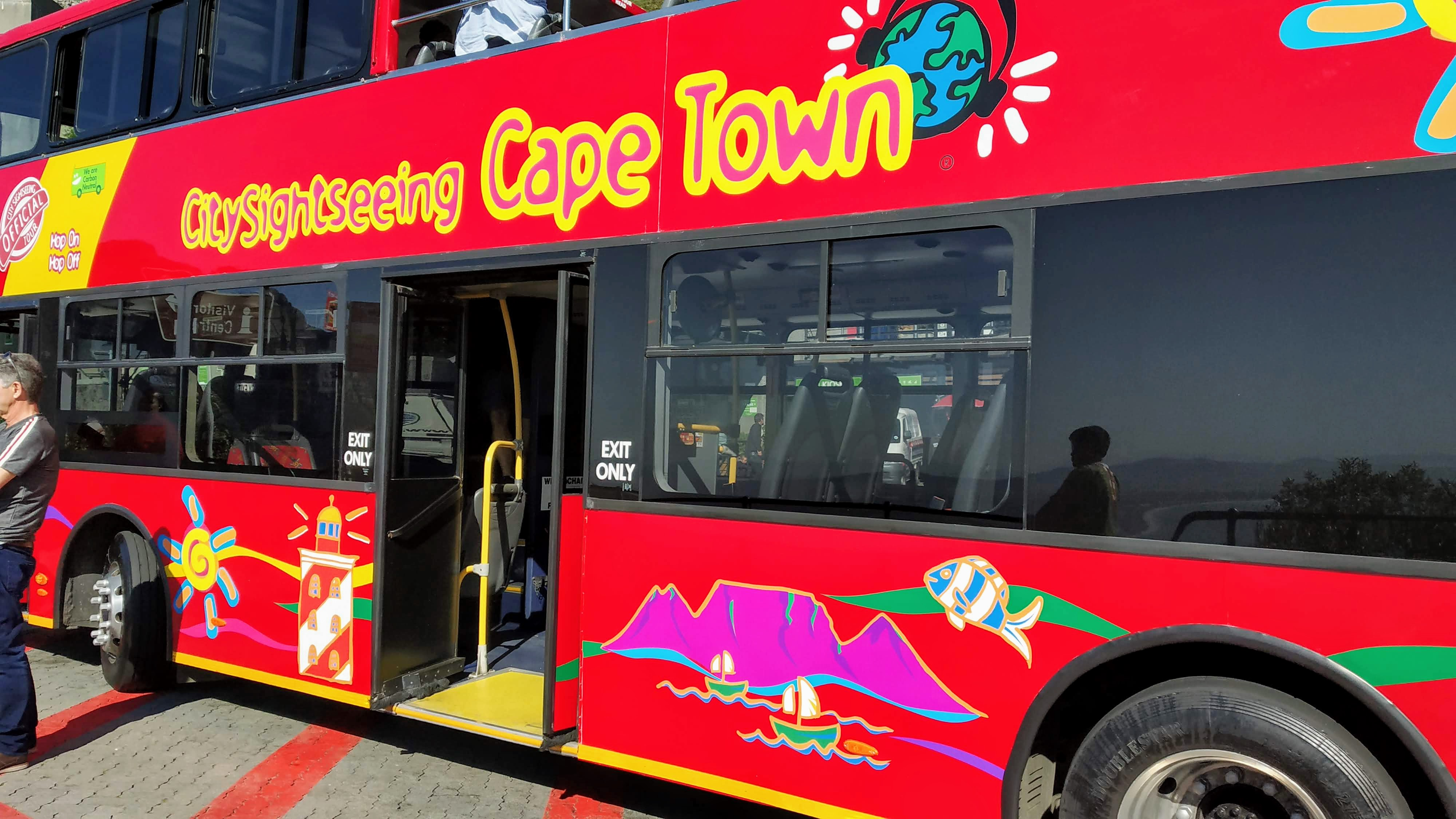
- Service type: Open top bus tours
- Website: citysightseeing.co.za

City Sightseeing Cape Town is a bus tour operator based in Cape Town, South Africa.

== Operations ==
City Sightseeing Cape Town is operating since 2002 & is a part of the international City Sightseeing franchise. It operates open-top bus tours in attractions such as the Table Mountain Aerial Cableway, V&A Waterfront, Kirstenbosch National Botanical Garden, and Constantia wine region.
