= New Forest Tour =

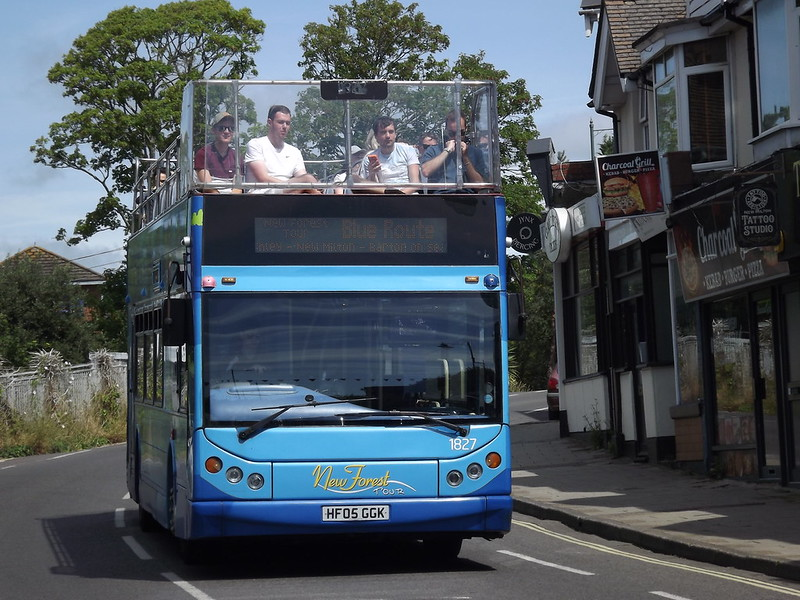
- Morebus Volvo B7TL at New Milton on July 2026

Overview
- Operator: Bluestar/Morebus
- Vehicle: Volvo B7TL/East Lancs Myllennium Vyking Convertible open-top
- Began service: May 2004

Service
- Frequency: Every hour (Red and Green routes), every hour 1/4 (Blue route)

The New Forest Tour, first launched in 2004, are a route trio of open-top bus services operating around the New Forest. Three circular routes are provided, operating across various towns, attractions and villages in the protected forest. All routes are operated jointly by Morebus and Bluestar in partnership with Hampshire County Council, New Forest District Council and the New Forest National Park Authority.

While passengers travel onboard the tour throughout their day, they are able to alight throughout the journey. They can either catch the next tour circuit, or switch between different routes with the same ticket. All buses operating the New Forest Tour are fitted with audio commentary, allowing passengers to hear the stories of the people, places and animals of the New Forest, with music and sound effects that is said "to bring the view to life". Customers are able to track buses via live departure times, or visually on a map at bus stops, by visiting the Morebus or Bluestar websites, or the Morebus and Bluestar app, where tickets can also be bought.

== History ==
=== Initial launch ===
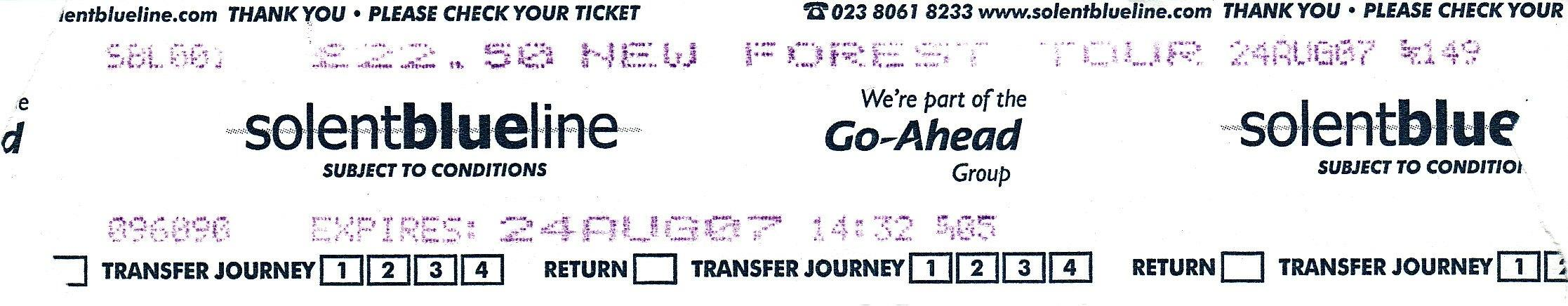
A New Forest Tour ticket from 2007.

The tour was set up in 2004 by Solent Blue Line and City Sightseeing. The aim was to get traffic off the roads in and around the New Forest. When started, Solent Blue Line used a Bristol VR on a circular tour around the forest with a bike trailer.

In 2005, the tour continued in a similar form, except the route was reversed to today's anti-clockwise version.

In 2006 Solent Blue Line operated the tour with two nearly-new open-top buses from Wilts & Dorset. This was possible due to a £100,000 payment from Hampshire County Council. With an additional combined £30,000 funding every year for three years from the New Forest District Council and National Park Authority, the tour could run hourly instead of two hourly.

=== Under Go South Coast ===
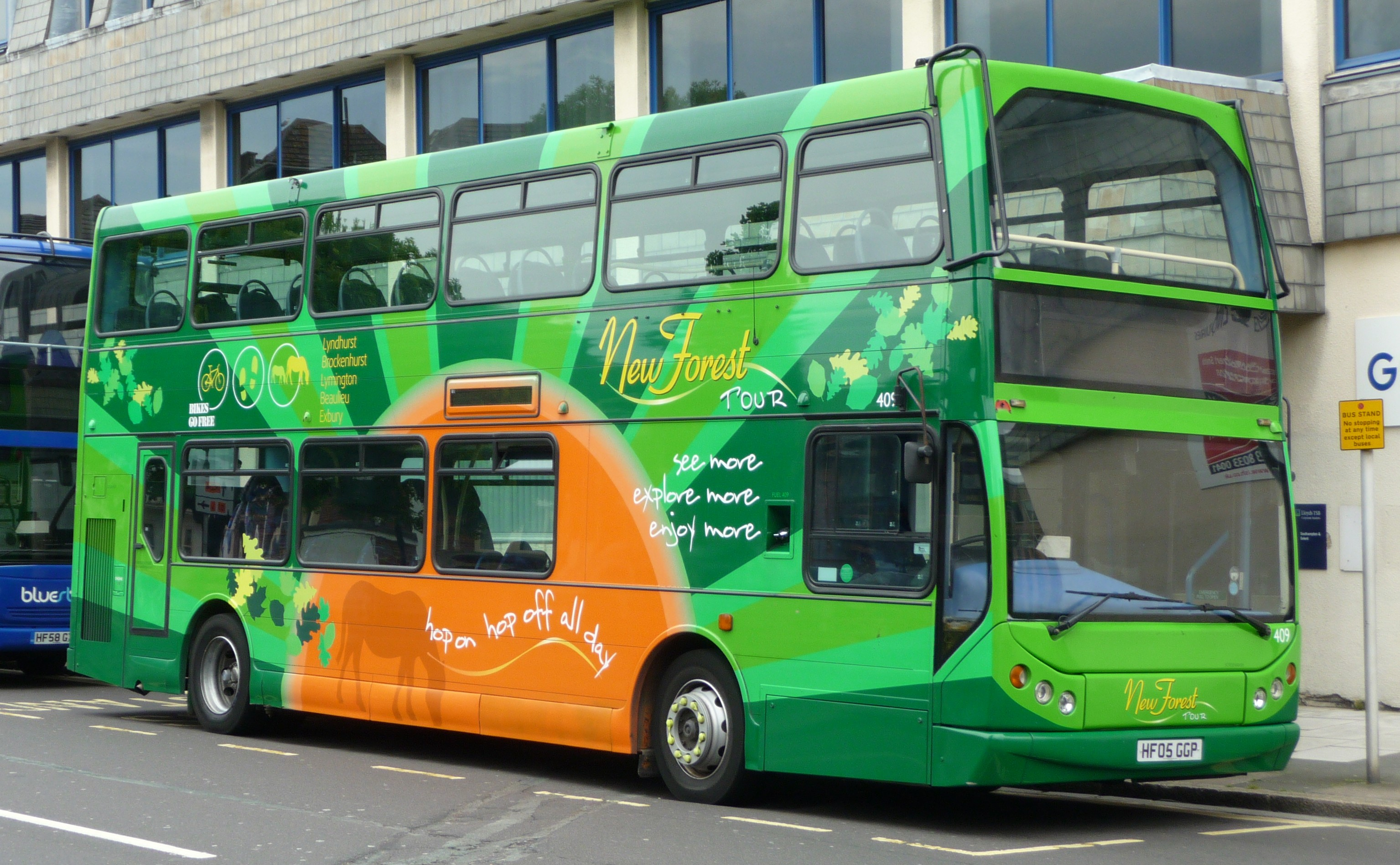
East Lancs Myllennium Vyking bodied Volvo B7TL with its closed top in May 2009

In 2007, the association with City Sightseeing was dropped, the 2006 review concluding that marketing should be developed with core funding partners, in a way "appropriate for the New Forest destination". The same buses as used in 2006 were used on the tour this year, which by now Solent Blue Line had acquired from Wilts & Dorset, both being part of Go South Coast.

As part of the new marketing, the vehicles were painted in a new green livery with ponies on the side, essentially a green version of Southern Vectis' Island Breezers livery. The Tour's website was launched, and 60,000 leaflets were distributed to over 300 places. An official guide was also launched, given to passengers as they boarded the tour. The buses no longer towed trailers, carrying bicycles on the lower deck instead.

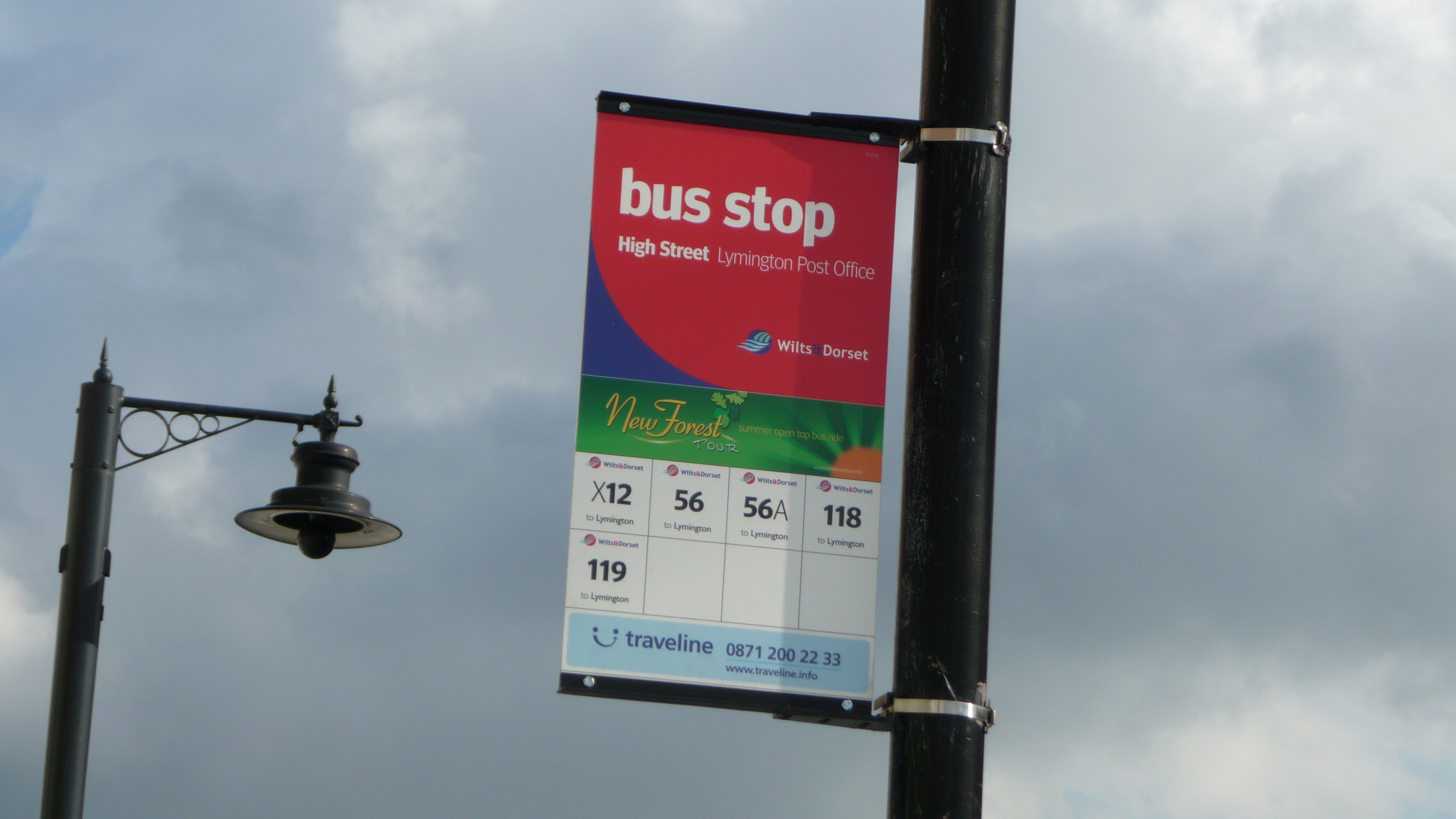
A bus stop with the New Forest Tour flag

Prior to the 2008 service starting, Solent Blue Line renamed all of its services to run under the Bluestar name. The New Forest Tour remained a separate brand, but details appeared on the Bluestar website. The tour ran from 24 May to 31 August, and the connections to the tour were withdrawn. A professionally recorded commentary was added to the service.

=== Continued operations ===
2008 was the final year of the three year funding commitment. In the 2008 review, Bluestar stated that revenue from ticket sales alone did not cover the cost of the current operation. To continue the tour in the same format into 2009 would require a subsidy.

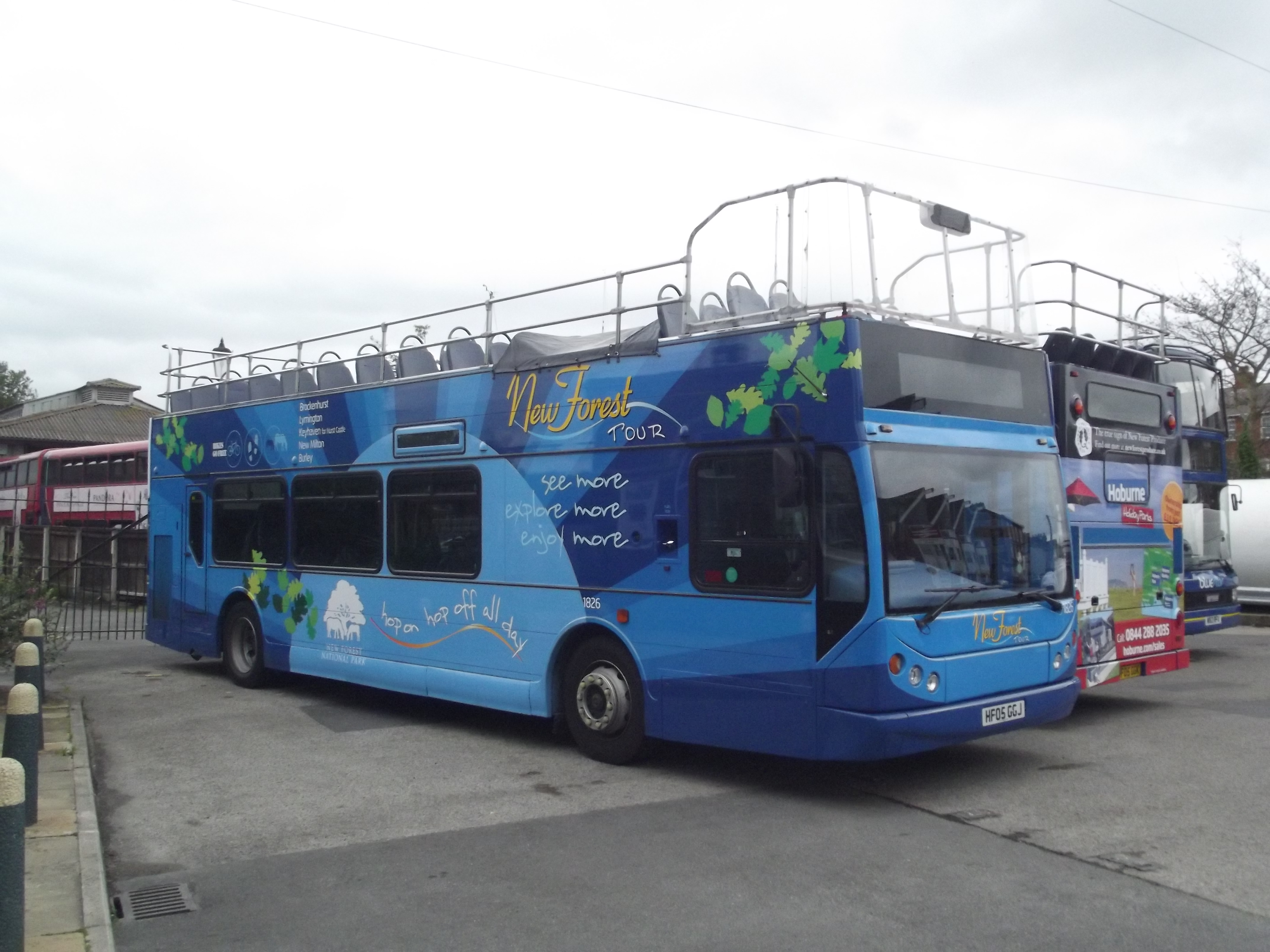
New Forest Tour buses in Lymington bus station in June 2013

Therefore, a tender exercise was worked on by Hampshire County Council to determine the level of subsidy required. This would allow for any operator to bid for the tender. A number of options were considered, such as continuing as in 2008, only operating between Wednesdays and Sundays, only operating on the weekend and only using one bus.

The tour did return in 2009, between Saturday 20 June and Sunday 13 September 2009, running a similar service to 2008.

For the 2012 season the Red Route was introduced and a new GPS commentary was added to the two tours. For the 2013 season, the tours ran between 29 June and 15 September, and for this season the Blue Route was introduced following the popularity of the other two tours the previous year. Each tour originally ran hourly but, in 2014, the Green route was adjusted to include Hythe, extending timings by 10 minutes. The Blue Route, following large quantities of passengers alighting and boarding, was reduced to operate every 75 minutes to keep the service running punctually, and therefore the frequency of all 3 routes was reduced to every 1 hr 15mins.

From 2014 to 2025 the tours continued with a frequency of almost one bus per hour, with 2 buses running each route. However, for the 2026 season both the Red and Blue routes were reduced to a frequency of 2 hours and 15 minutes following low passenger demand, with only one bus on each of these routes. The Green Route continues to operate on a near hourly basis.

== Routes ==
The New Forest Tour network comprises three circular bus routes, with a specific colour scheme used for each route.

=== Green Route ===
The Green Route runs in an anticlockwise direction, with the starting point being in the town of Lyndhurst, and explores the towns and villages of Brockenhurst, Lymington, Beaulieu, Exbury, Dibden Purlieu, Hythe and Applemore. The total time for a full round trip is 2 hours and 3 minutes with extensions to Totton available for the first and final buses. Connections to fellow Tour circuits can be made in Lyndhurst and Brockenhurst (for the Red Route) and Brockenhurst and Lymington (for the Blue Route).

=== Blue Route ===
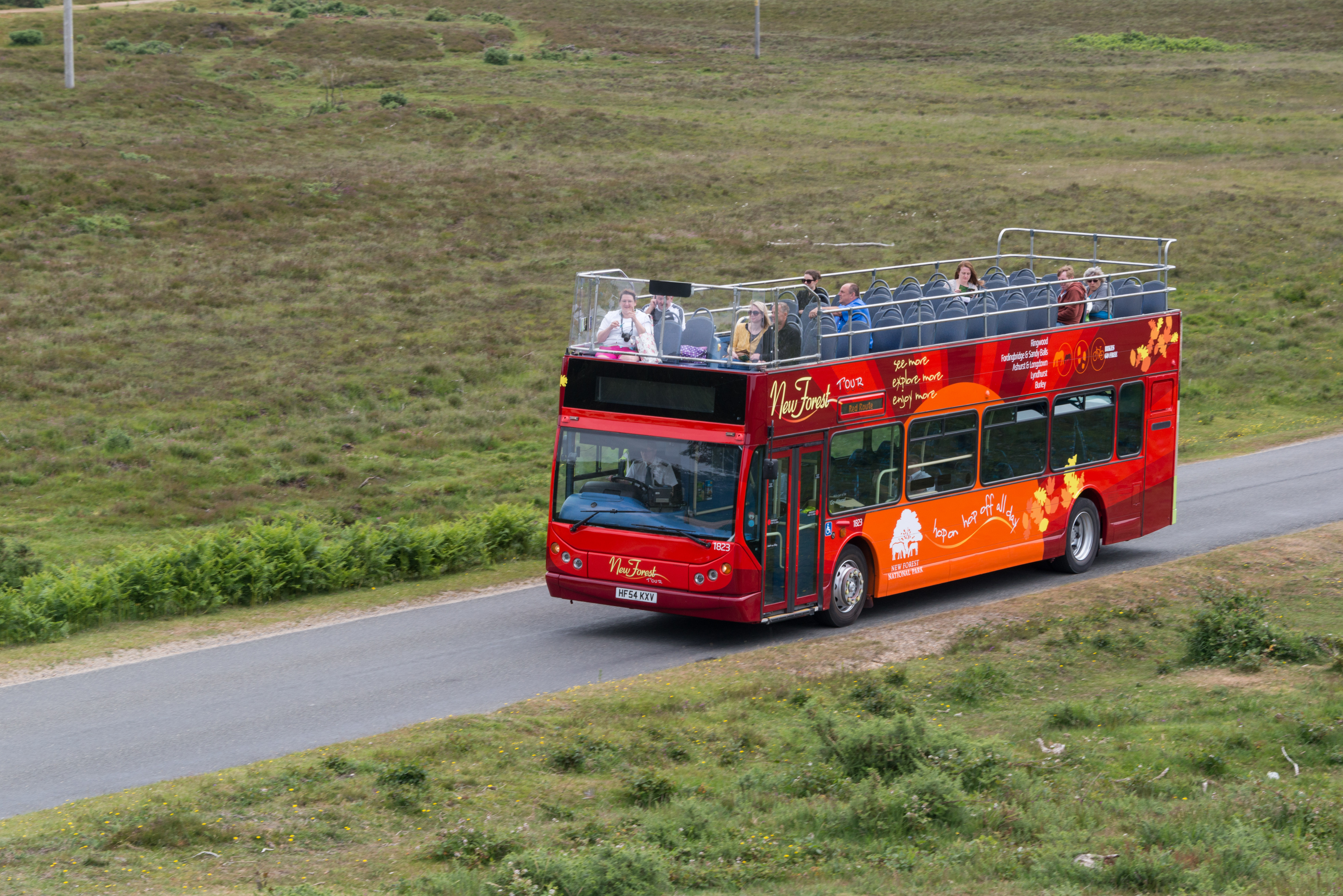
A New Forest Tour open-top bus which serves as part of the Red Route

The Blue Route operates in an anticlockwise direction, with the starting point being in the town of Brockenhurst, and visits the towns, villages, and attractions of Burley, Bashley, New Milton, Barton-on-sea, Milford-on-sea and Lymington with the total time for a full round trip being 2 hours and 3 minutes. Connections to fellow Tour circuits can be made in Lymington and Brockenhurst (for the Green Route) and Brockenhurst and Burley (for the Red Route).

=== Red Route ===
The Red Route starts in the town of Lyndhurst and, until 2025, ran in a clockwise direction passing through the towns and villages of Burley, Ringwood, Fordingbridge, Cadnam and Ashurst with the total time for a full round trip being 2 hours and 5 minutes. As of the 2026 season the Red Route was reversed, and rerouted to include Brockenhurst after Burley. Connections to fellow Tour circuits can be made in Lyndhurst and Brockenhurst (for the Green Route) and Brockenhurst and Burley (for the Blue Route).

== See also ==
- List of bus operators of the United Kingdom
