= Bath Bus Company =

British bus operator operating in Bath and Cardiff

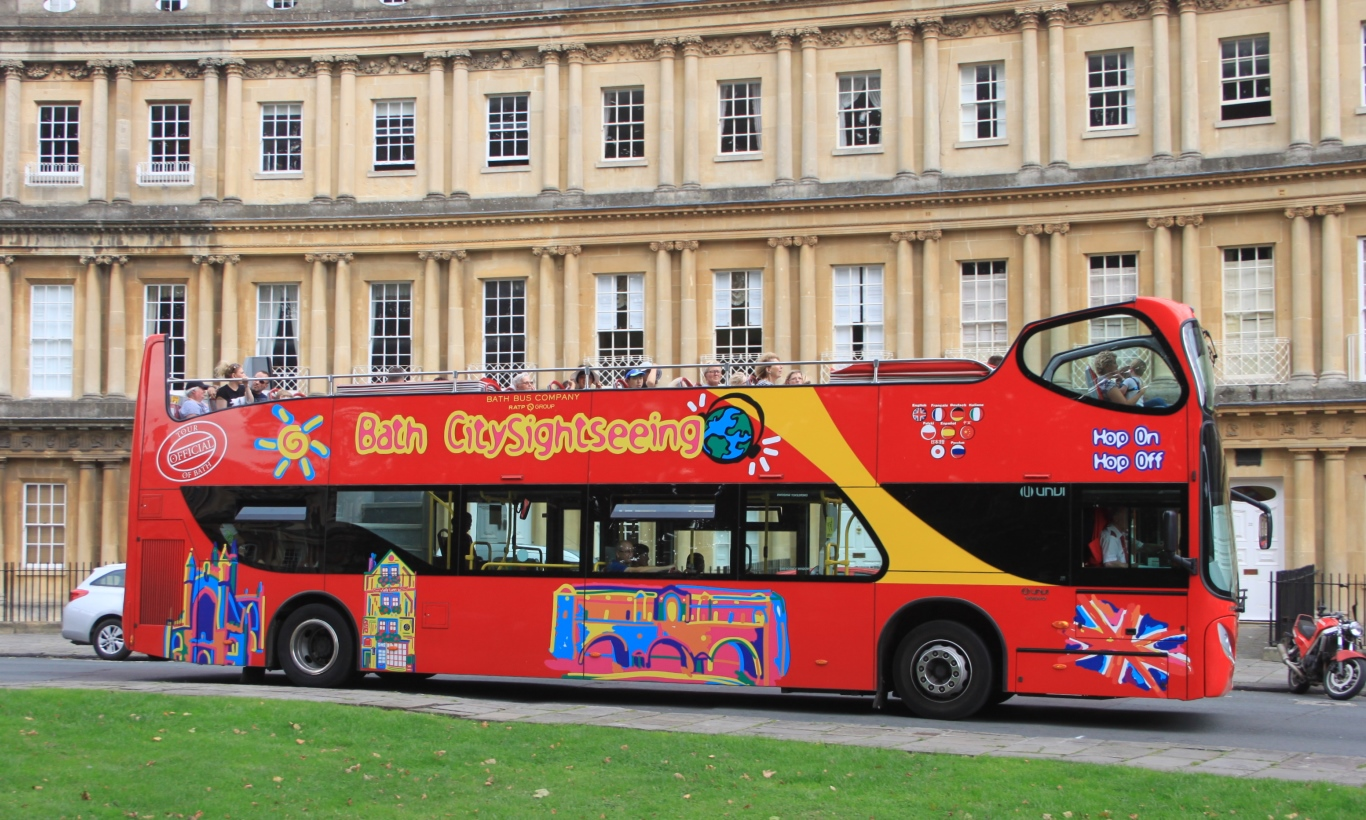
- Unvi Urbis-bodied Volvo B9TL tour bus in The Circus, Bath in 2015
- Parent: First West of England
- Founded: 1997; 29 years ago
- Headquarters: Bath
- Service area: Bath; Cardiff
- Service type: Bus services Open top bus tours
- Depots: 2
- Fleet: 21 (December 2025)
- Chief executive: Martin Curtis
- Website: www.bathbuscompany.com

The Bath Bus Company is a bus operator in the United Kingdom which runs open top tours in Bath, Bristol and Cardiff, and the 'Bristol Air Decker' service between Bath and Bristol Airport. The company was a subsidiary of the French RATP Group from 2011 until 2025 when it was sold to FirstGroup.

== History ==
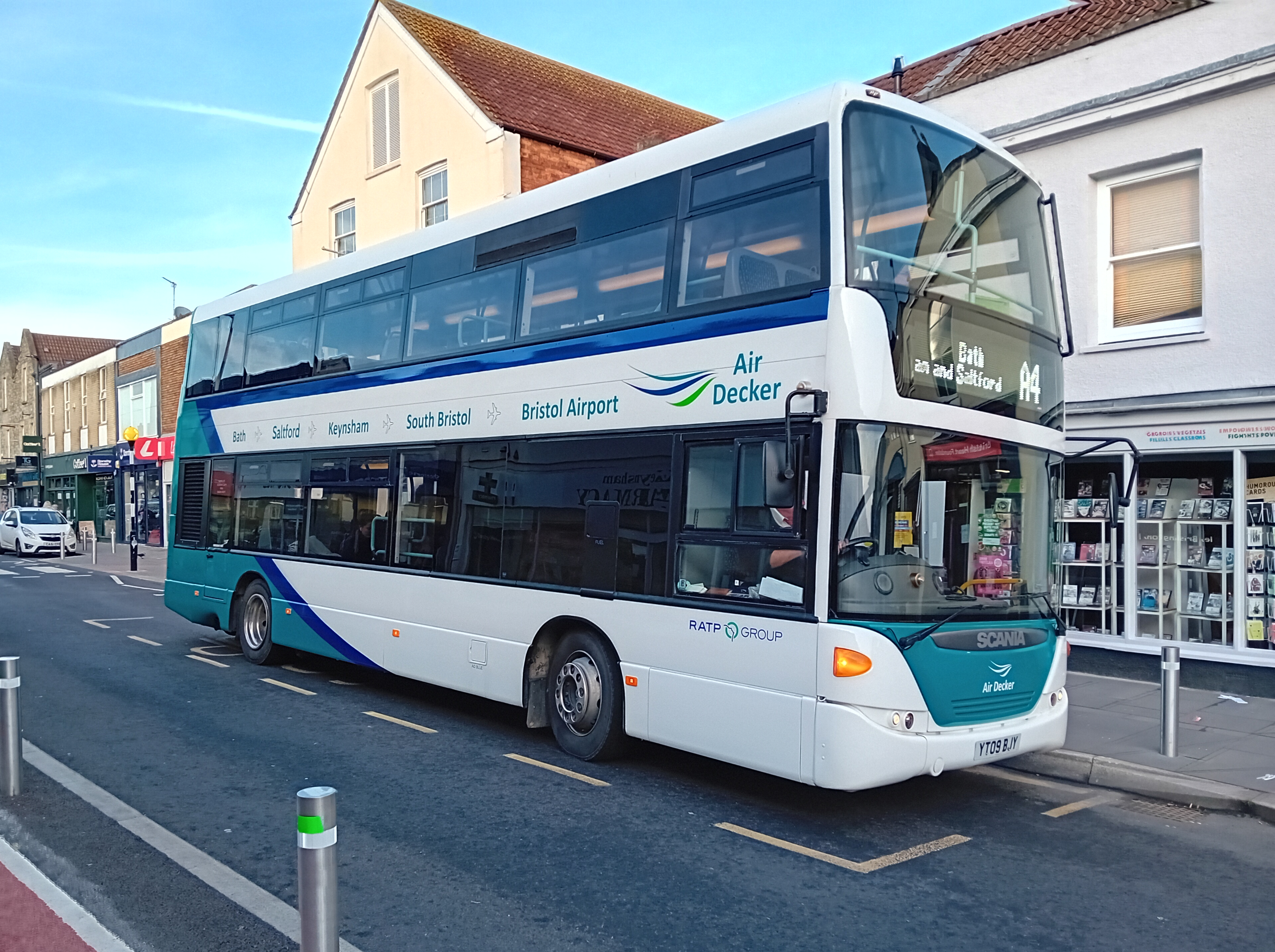
Scania OmniCity on an 'Air Decker' service in Keynsham in 2024

Bath Bus Company was formed in May 1997 by Martin Curtis and three other former Badgerline managers. It commenced operating open top tours in Bath with Bristol VRTs and an AEC Routemaster. It later diversified into the operation of tendered services. In 1999, Bath Bus Company became a City Sightseeing franchisee.

The business was purchased by Ensignbus in June 2004, who transferred its existing City Sightseeing operations in Cardiff, Eastbourne and Windsor to become part of Bath Bus Company. In February 2011, the business was purchased by RATP Dev, the overseas division of RATP Group.

A service was started in March 2013 that linked Bath with Bristol Airport and branded 'Air Decker'. It offered through ticketing with Abus services in the Bristol area. On 21 November 2014, the company began a short-term service between Bristol and Bath using the country's first bus powered entirely by human and food waste. The biomethane gas is generated at Bristol sewage treatment works in Avonmouth, which is run by GENeco, a subsidiary of Wessex Water. The introduction of the Bath Clean Air Zone in March 2021 caused the Bath Bus Company to invest heavily in new buses for its services.

The Bath Bus Company introduced a new tour in nearby Bristol in May 2021 which was branded Tootbus Bath. Bristol tours had been operated by Rubicon Tours from 1994 until 2020. The Tootbus Bath brand would also appear later that year on some tours in Bath but others would retain the more familiar City Sightseeing branding. It was announced in December 2025 that FirstGroup had taken over the operations of Tootbus Bath from RATP Dev. The acquisition included a fleet of 21 buses used on sightseeing tours and the Air Decker service linking Bath with Bristol Airport, and the leased depot in Keynsham.

== Services ==
As well as open top bus tours in Bath, Bristol and Cardiff, the Bath Bus Company operates a service from Bath to Bristol Airport branded as 'Air Decker'.

== Fleet ==
The fleet consisted of 36 buses in October 2014 but had reduced to 21 by December 2025.
