= Big Bus Tours =

Global operator of hop-on hop-off sightseeing bus tours

Big Bus Tours Group Holdings Ltd

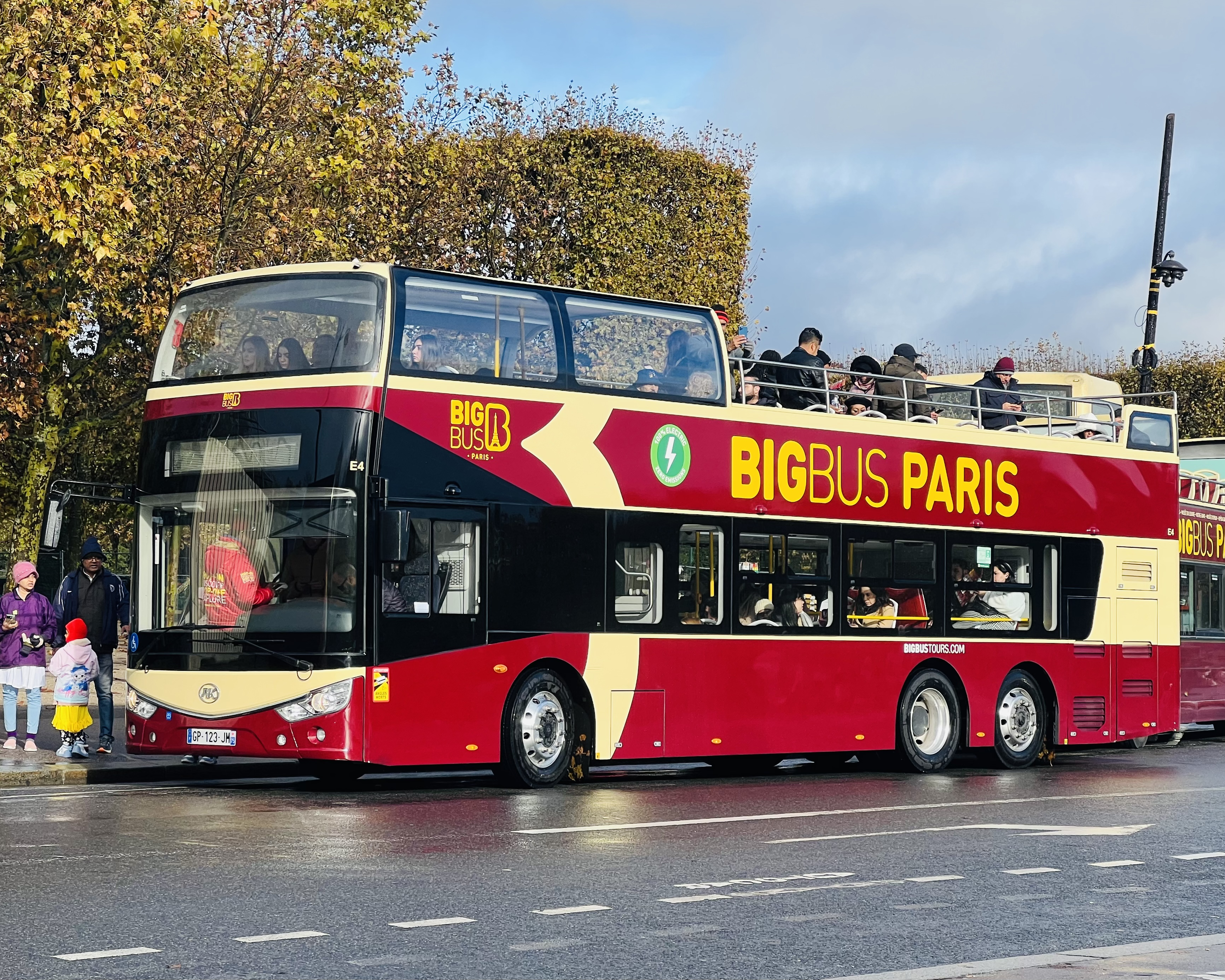
- Ankai G9 in Paris in 2023
- Trade name: Big Bus Tours
- Type: Private
- Industry: Open top bus operator
- Predecessors: Les Cars Rouges; Big Bus Company
- Founded: 1991; 35 years ago
- Headquarters: Belgravia, London, England, United Kingdom
- Areas served: Australia; Abu Dhabi; Berlin; Budapest; Chicago; Darwin; Dubai; Dublin; Hong Kong; Istanbul; Las Vegas; Los Angeles; London; Miami; Munich; Muscat; New York; Paris; Philadelphia; Prague; Rome; San Francisco; Singapore; Sydney; Vancouver; Vienna; Washington, D.C.
- Key people: Pat Waterman (Chairman); Benedict Smith (Chief financial officer)
- Revenue: ▲$ 277.7 million(2024)
- Operating income: ▼$(2.3) million(2019)
- Net income: ▼$(45.6) million(2019)
- Owners: Exponent Private Equity (85%); Merlin Entertainments (15%)
- Website: bigbustours.com

Big Bus Tours (formerly Les Cars Rouges and The Big Bus Company), is an operator of open top bus sightseeing tours formed in May 2011 after "Les Cars Rouges" and the "Big Bus Company" merged. The company operates in 28 cities of 18 countries with 444 buses operating around the world. Most of the cities it serves are in the United States. Typically, Big Bus Tours use open top double-decker buses in burgundy and cream-coloured livery.

== History ==
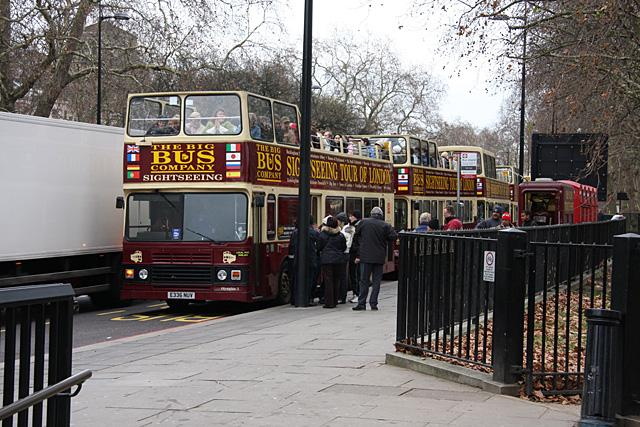
Big Bus company kiosk and bus queue at Speakers' Corner, London

"Les Cars Rouges" was founded in 1990 by Abdallah El Azm in Paris, France. Over the course of the next two decades, it went on to operate in Paris, Rome, Washington DC, Las Vegas, San Francisco, Miami, and Istanbul. The "Big Bus Company" first started operating in London, England in June 1991 with three buses by the Maybury family. It later expanded to Dubai, Abu Dhabi, Hong Kong, Shanghai, Philadelphia, and so on.

"Les Cars Rouges" and "the Big Bus Company" merged in May 2011, and formed "Big Bus Tours". Les Cars Rouges was the larger of the two companies, but for international namesake purposes, the name "Big Bus" was retained.

In May 2007, the Abu Dhabi company the Al Fahim Group purchased a 30% shareholding.

In February 2015, the business was sold to Exponent Private Equity. In February 2016, Merlin Entertainments bought a 15% shareholding.

== Overview of operation ==
Buses travel near major landmarks around the city it tours. Pre-recorded or live commentary about the landscape is provided through small headphones worn by each passenger. Users may leave the bus and board again without limit (hop-on, hop-off) at special bus stops on a circular route. In large cities, buses go on more than one route. In some cities (such as Hong Kong) some variants of the ride include travelling by boat.

== Operations by country ==
=== Australia ===
- Big Bus Sydney
- Big Bus Darwin

=== Austria ===
- The Big Bus Vienna

=== Canada ===
- Big Bus Vancouver

=== Czech Republic ===
- Big Bus Prague

=== France ===
- Big Bus Paris

=== Germany ===
- Big Bus Berlin
- Big Bus Munich

=== Greece ===
- Big Bus Athens
- Big Bus Thessaloniki

=== Hong Kong ===
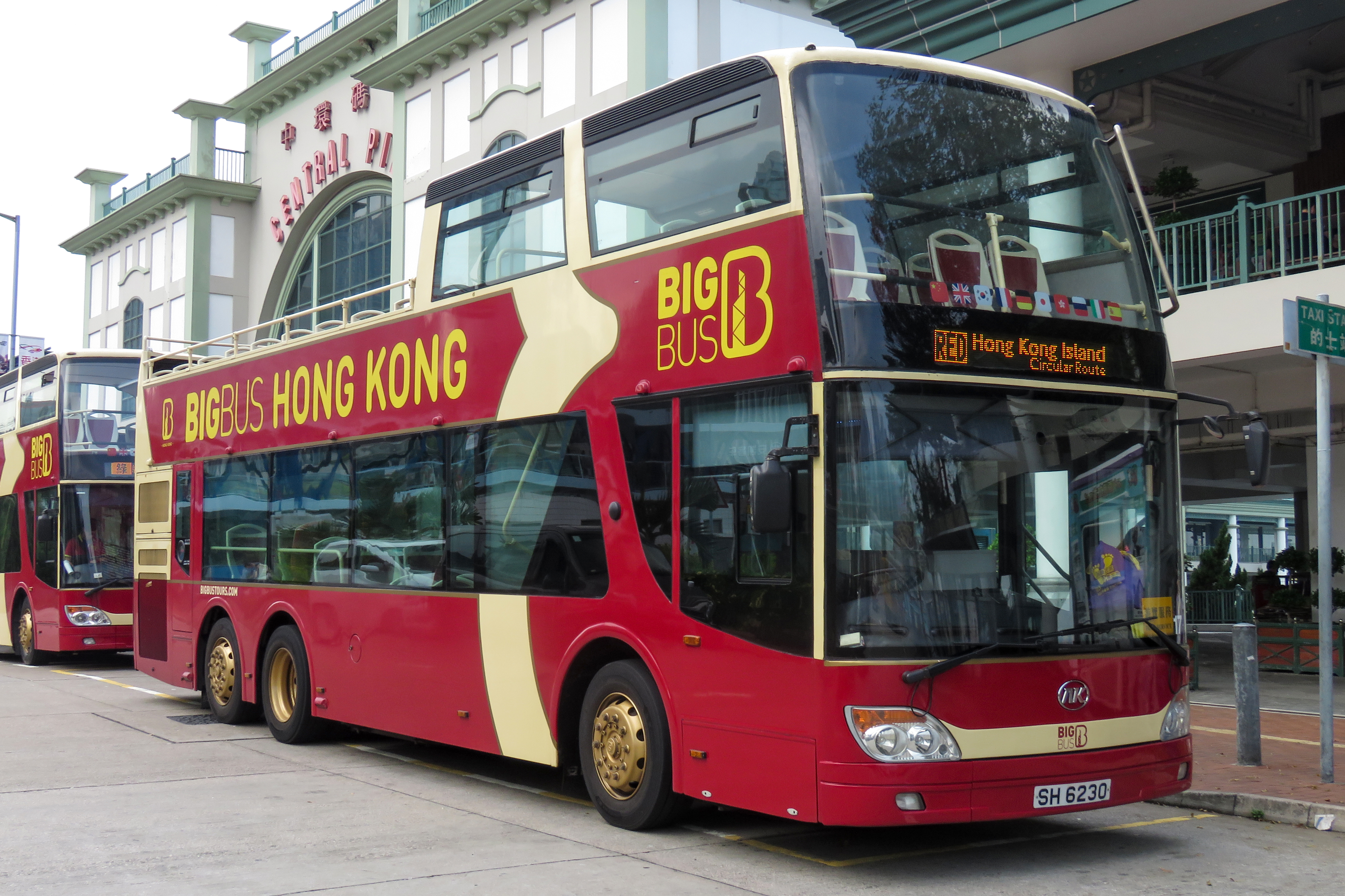
Big Bus in Hong Kong

- Big Bus Hong Kong

On 15 December 2008, The Big Bus Hong Kong was established. With the largest fleet of open-top buses in the city, it serves three sightseeing routes: Hong Kong Island (Red Tour), Kowloon (Blue Tour) and Stanley (Green Tour). The tour offers a wide range of packages which include free travel on the Peak Tram, entry to the Sky Terrace on Victoria Peak, a traditional sampan ride, and a Star Ferry harbour tour.

=== Hungary ===
- Big Bus Budapest

=== Ireland ===
- Big Bus Dublin

In August 2018, Big Bus Dublin was officially launched with the most up-to-date fleet in the city. It operates a single route (the Red Route), which covers the city centre and Phoenix Park.

=== Italy ===
- Big Bus Rome

=== Oman ===
- Big Bus Muscat

=== Singapore ===
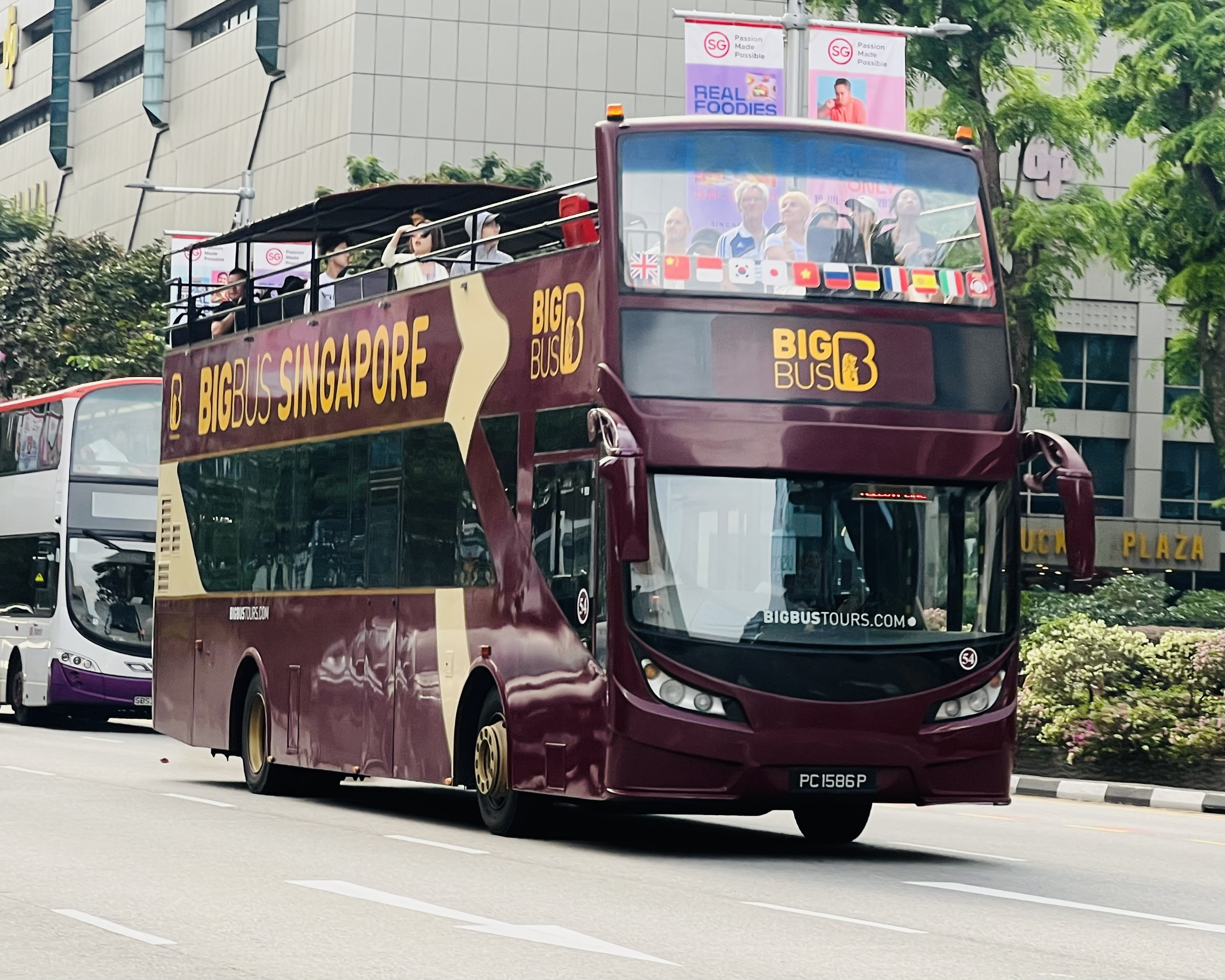
An open-top MAN 18.240 HOCL-NL bus on the Yellow Route in Singapore.

- Big Bus Singapore

Big Bus Tours Singapore operates two routes, the red and the yellow route, using Scania K230UB and MAN 18.240 HOCL-NL (A69) double-decker buses. Their future fleet includes 10 electric buses, with a planned deployment in 2027.

Big Bus Tours bought over local sightseeing tour operator Duck & Hippo (established 14 January 2011) in September 2018.

=== Spain ===
- Big Bus Madrid

=== United Arab Emirates (UAE) ===
- Big Bus Abu Dhabi
- Big Bus Dubai

=== United Kingdom ===
- Big Bus London

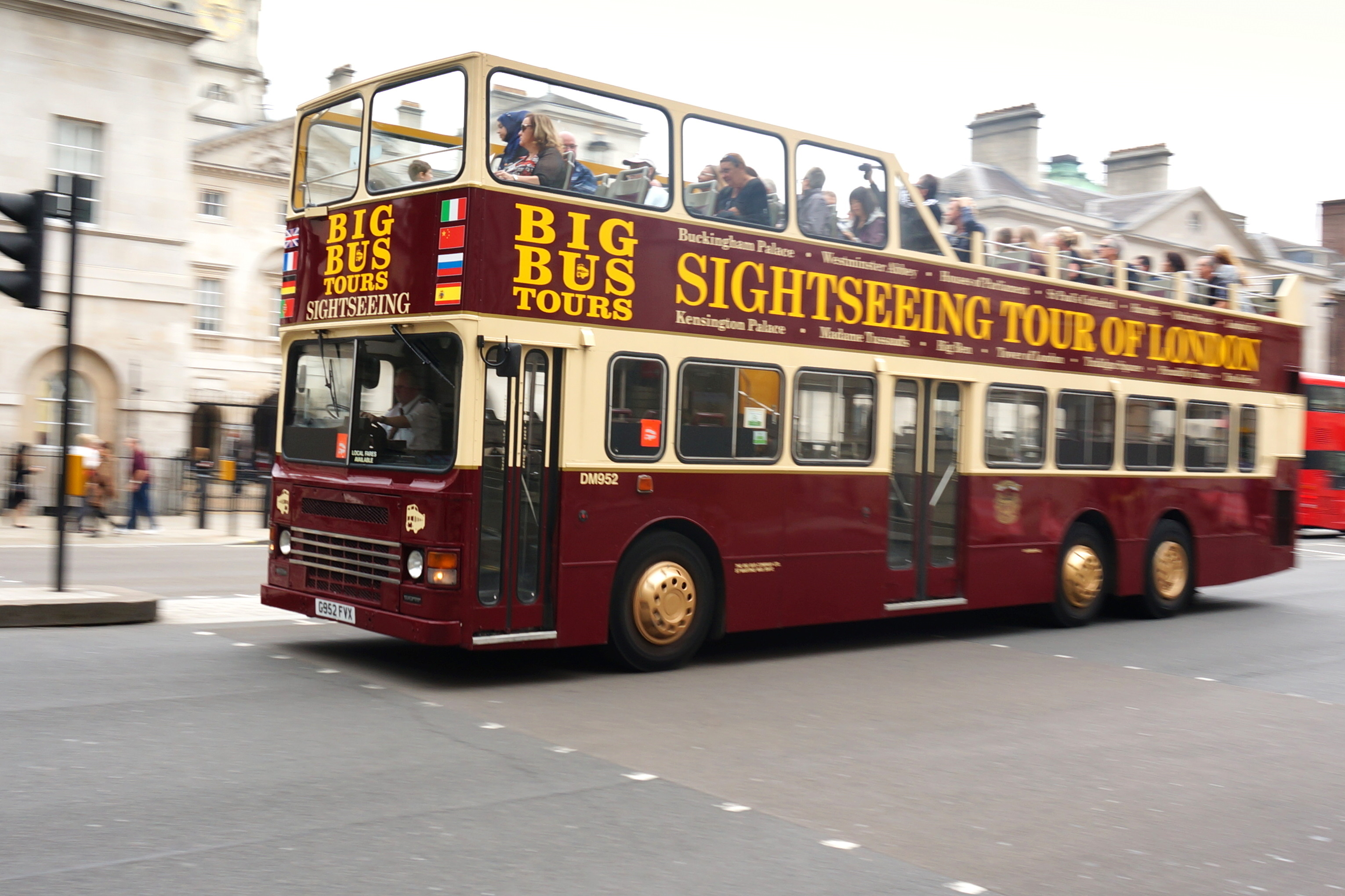
Dennis Condor of Big Bus

Big Bus Tours London operates three routes with stops at these tourist destinations: Madame Tussauds, Oxford Circus, Piccadilly Circus, Trafalgar Square, Whitehall, Westminster Bridge, London Eye, Covent Garden, St Paul's Cathedral, London Bridge, Tower of London, Westminster Abbey, Buckingham Palace, Harrods, Kensington Palace and Kensington Gardens.

- Big Bus Edinburgh

=== United States ===
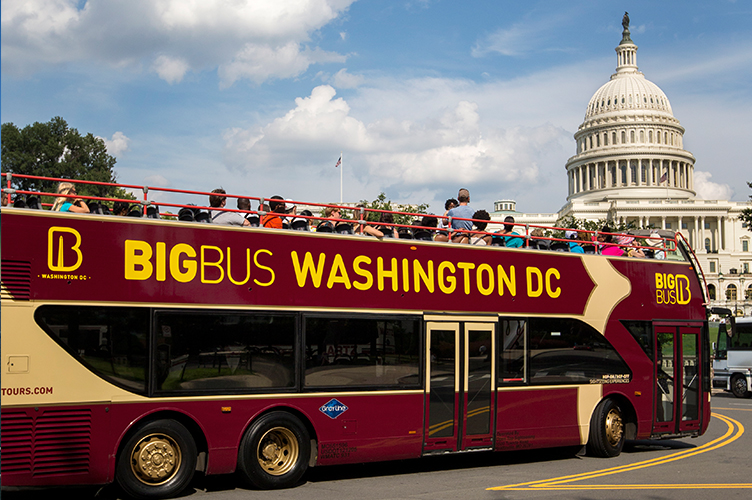
A Big Bus driving past the US Capitol in Washington, D.C.

- Big Bus Chicago
- Big Bus Las Vegas
- Big Bus Los Angeles
- Big Bus Miami
- Big Bus New York
- Big Bus Philadelphia
- Big Bus San Francisco
- Big Bus Washington, D.C.

== Gallery ==
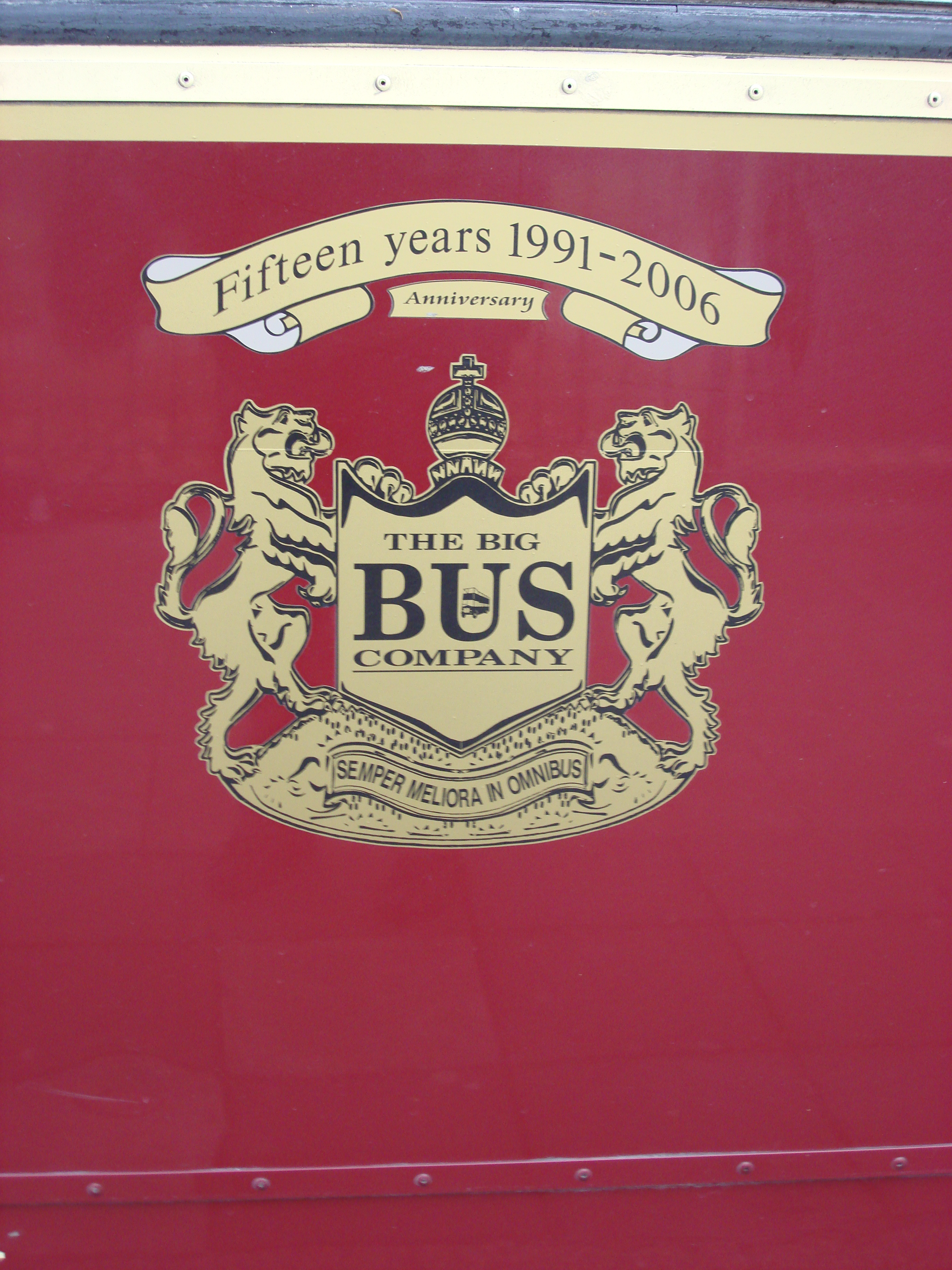
The Big Bus Company shield on the side of a vehicle

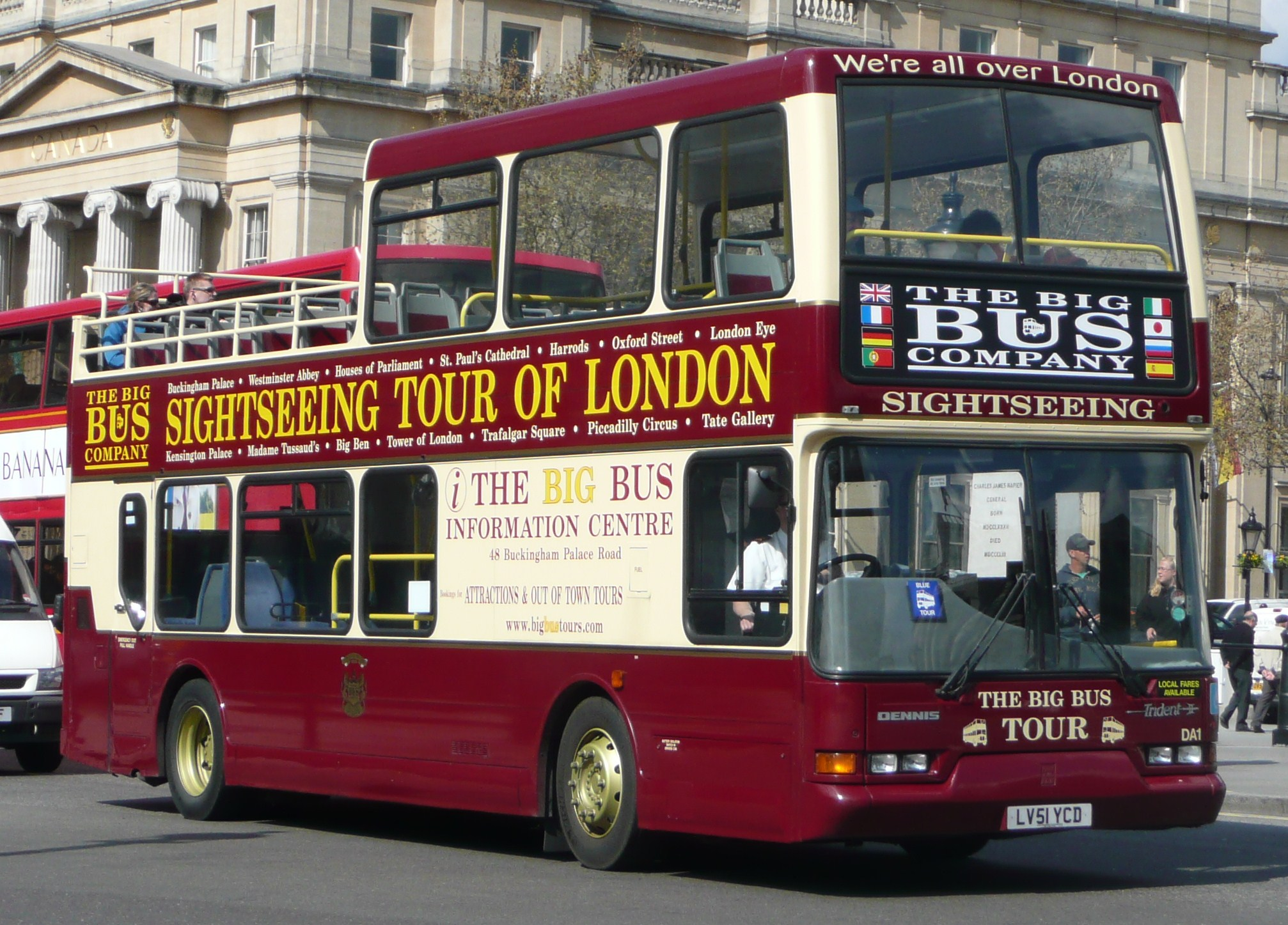
East Lancs Lolyne bodied Dennis Trident 2 in London

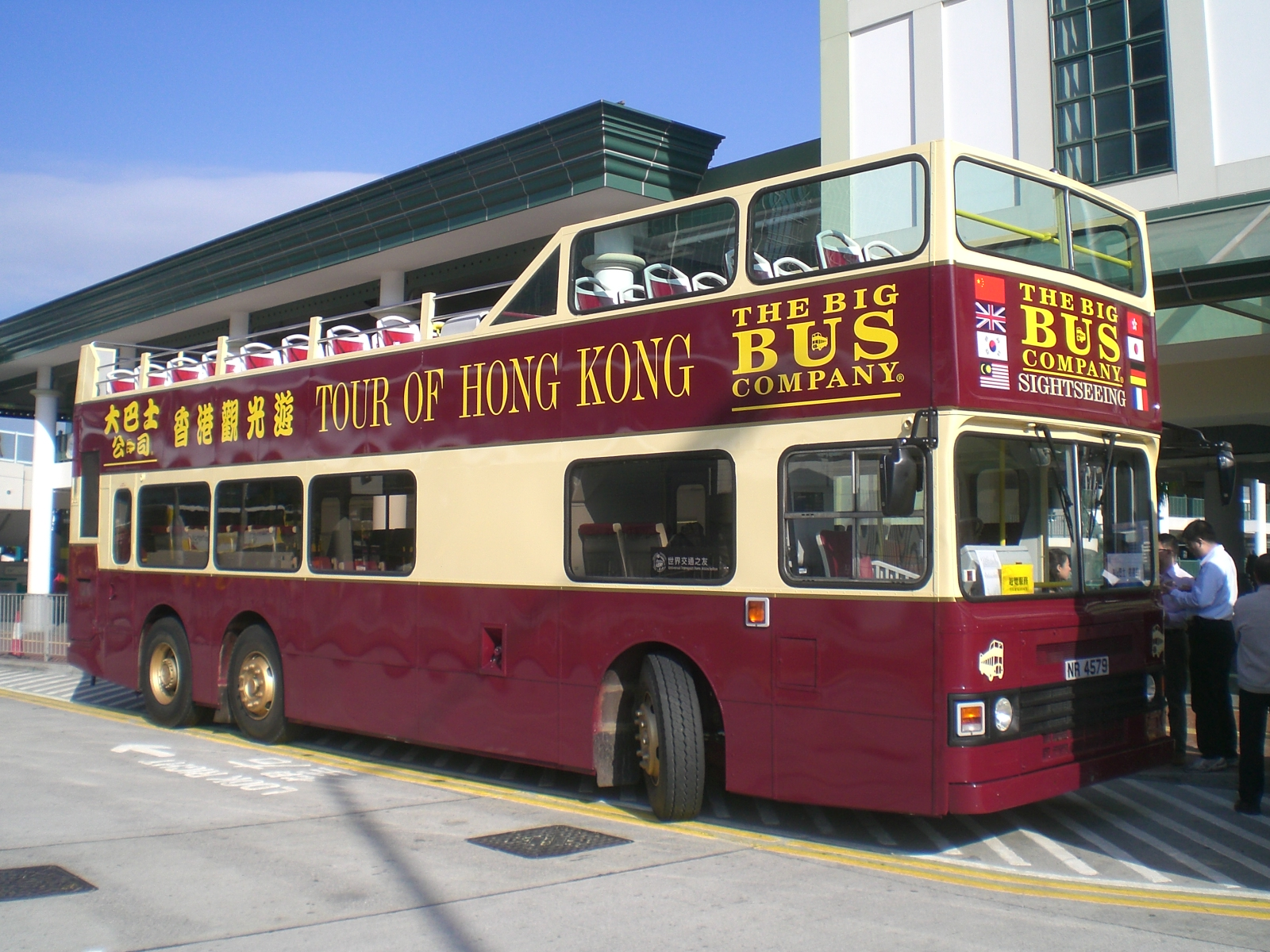
The Big Bus Company in Hong Kong

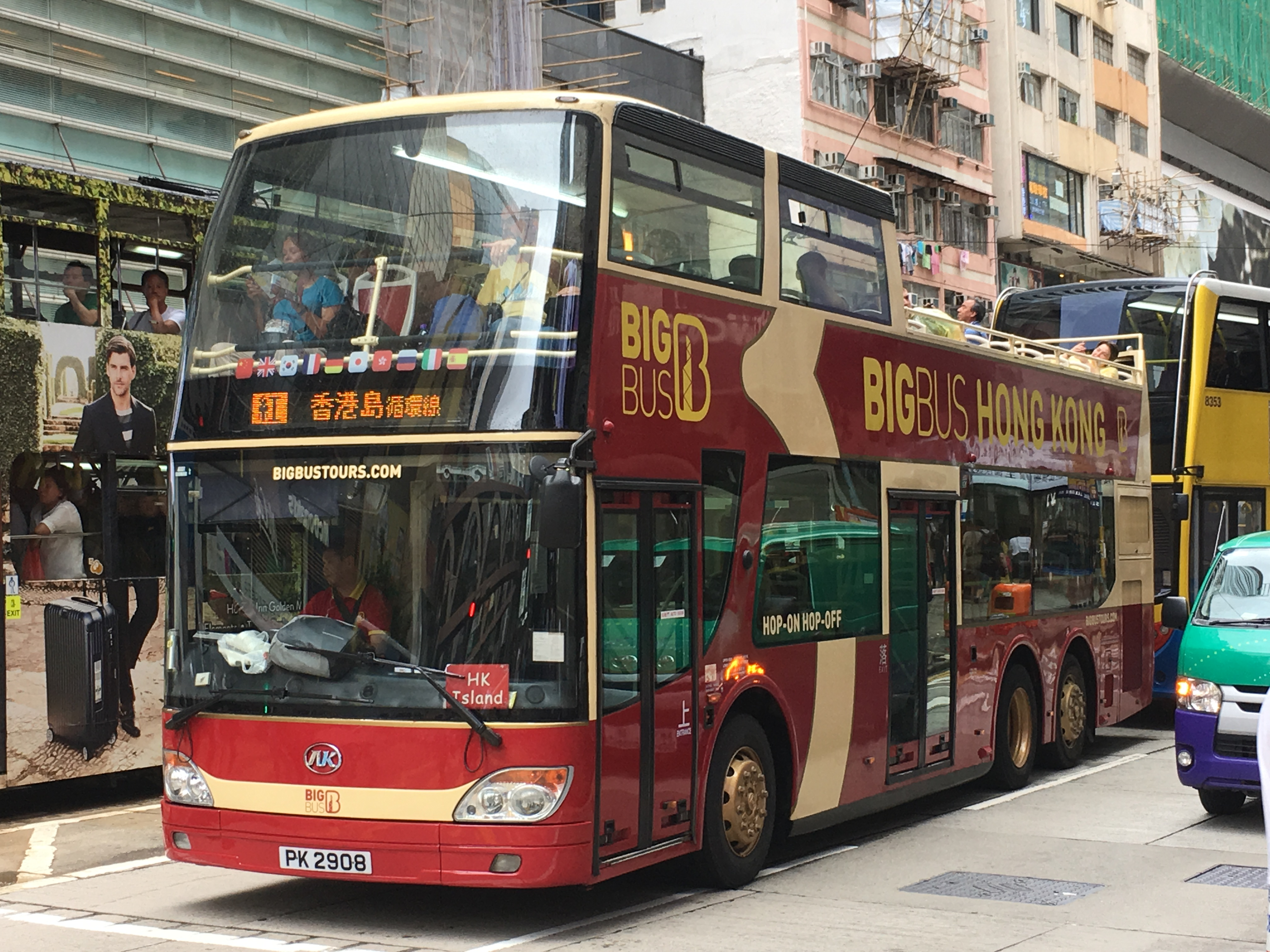
The Big Bus Company in Hong Kong

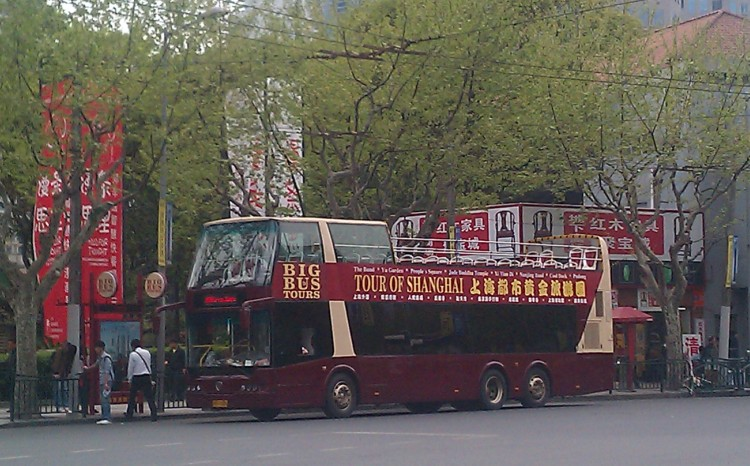
The Big Bus Company in Shanghai

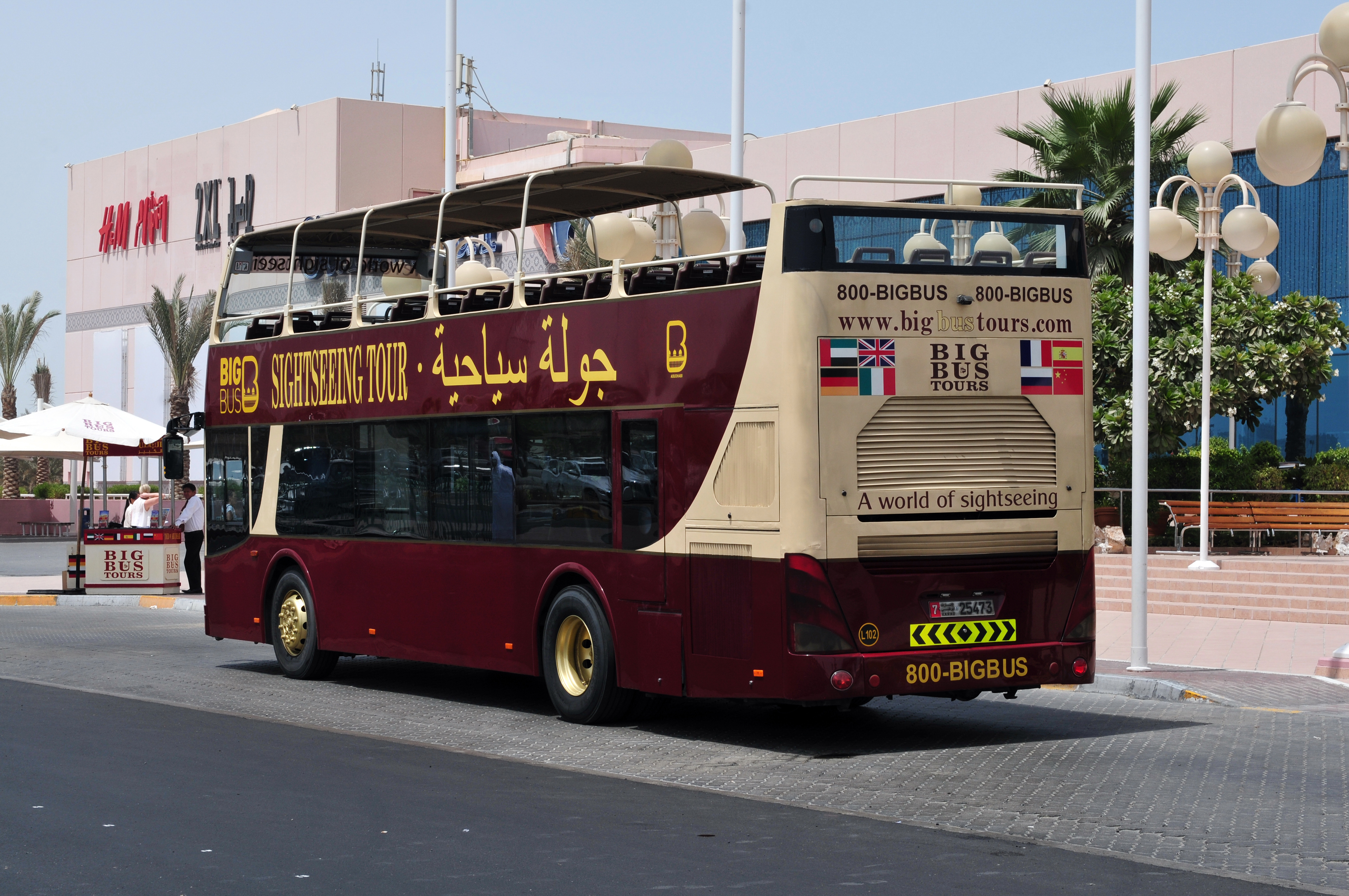
The Big Bus Company in Abu Dhabi

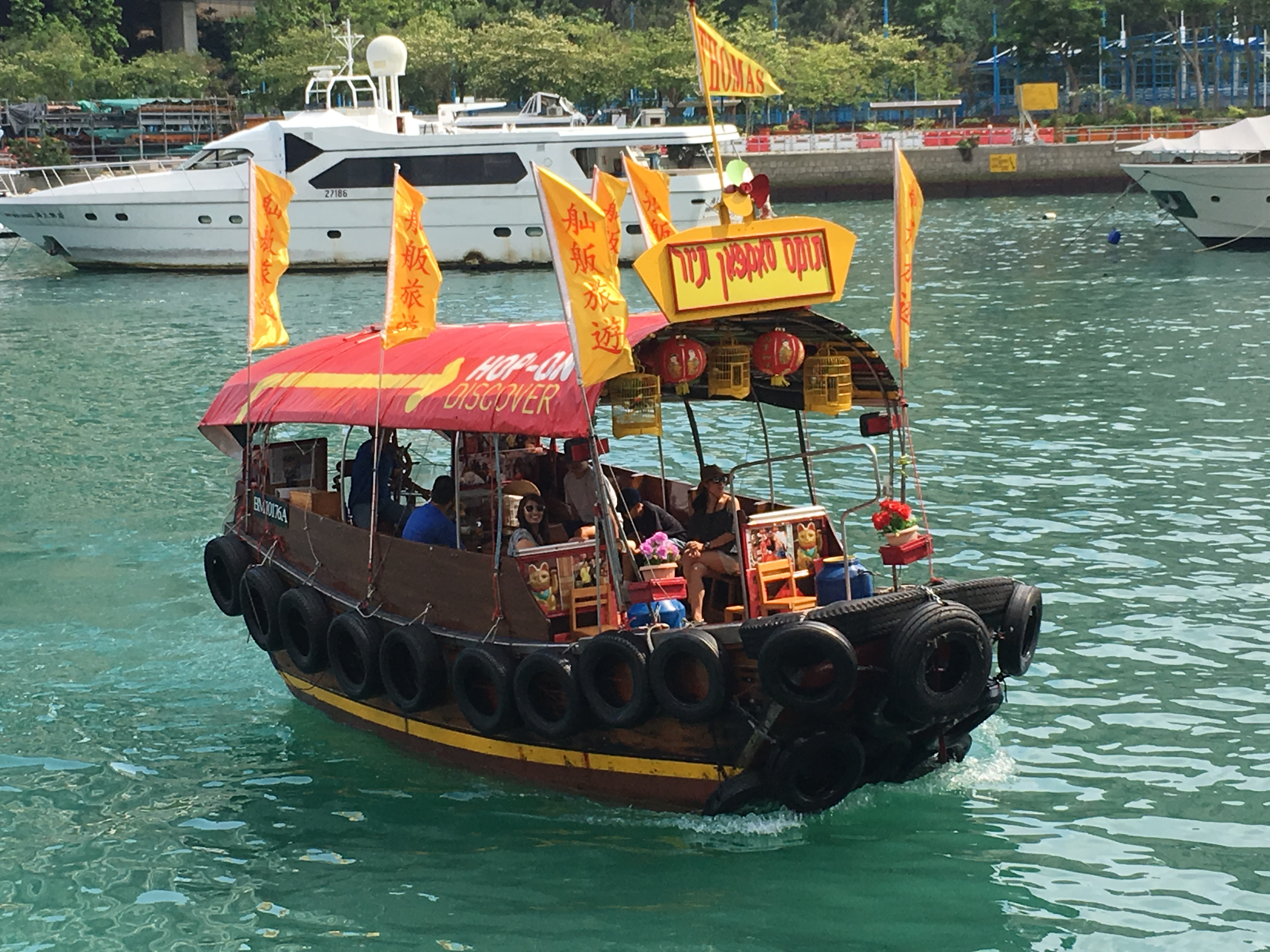
The Big Bus Company in Hong Kong (Aberdeen Shampan Ride)

== See also ==
- City Sightseeing
- List of bus operators of the United Kingdom
- Open top buses in the United Kingdom
