= City Sightseeing =

International sightseeing tour bus operator

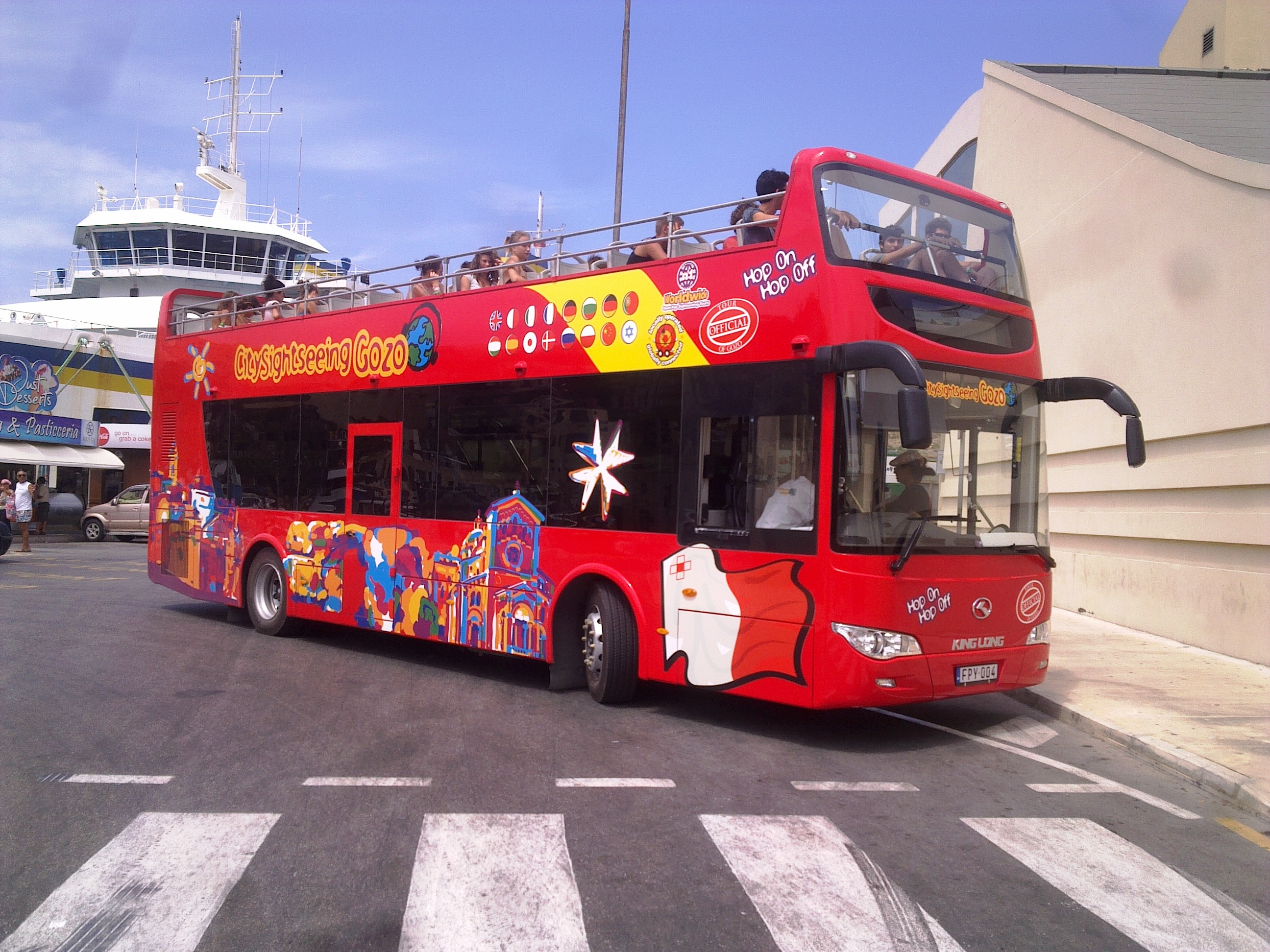
- City Sightseeing Gozo King Long in 2012
- Parent: Enrique Ybarra
- Founded: 1999
- Headquarters: Seville, Spain
- Service type: Open top bus tours, boat tours, sightseeing trains, and guided walking tours
- Fleet: 1000+
- Chief executive: Enrique Ybarra
- Website: https://city-sightseeing.com/en/home

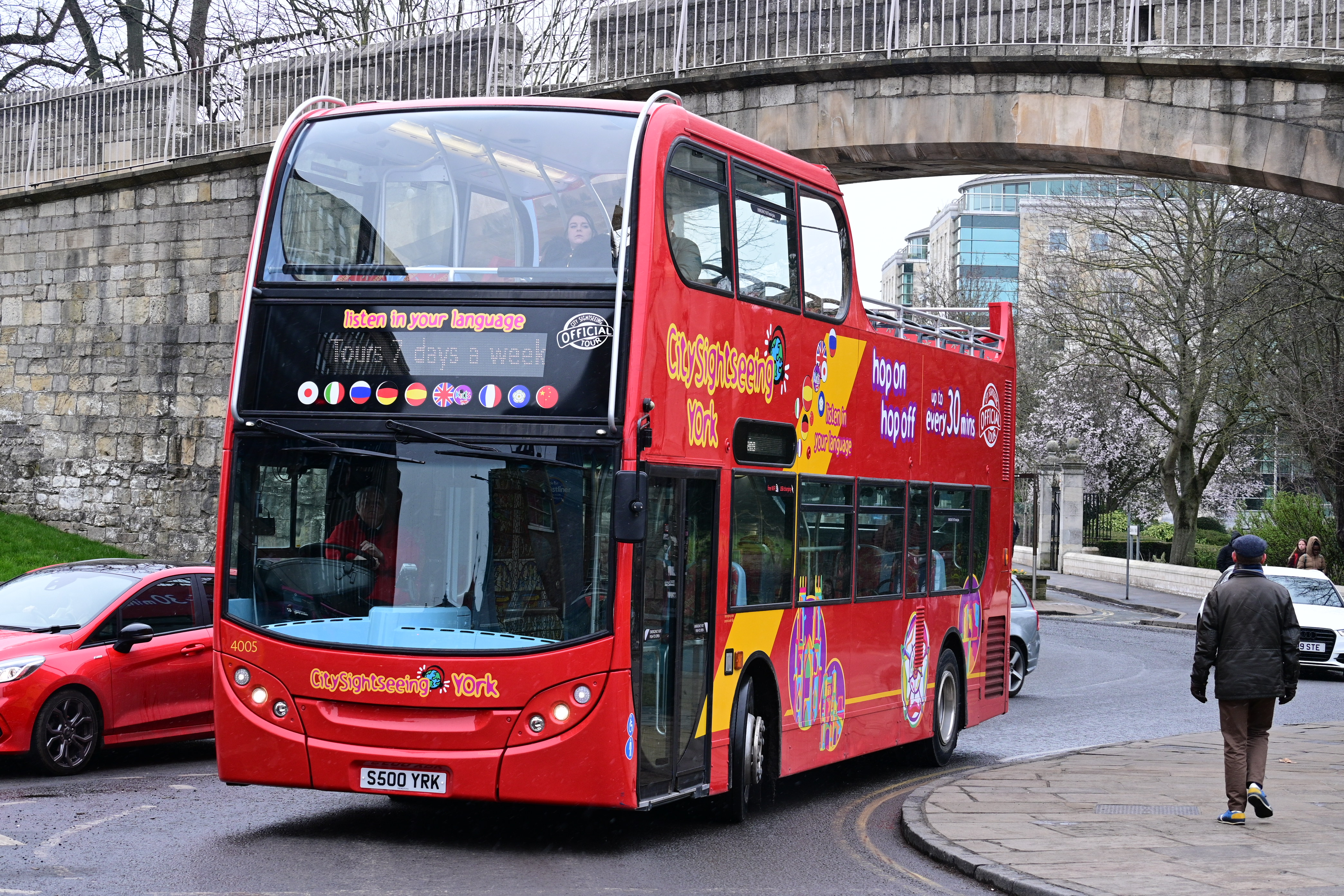
City Sightseeing York Alexander Dennis Enviro400 at the York city walls in March 2023

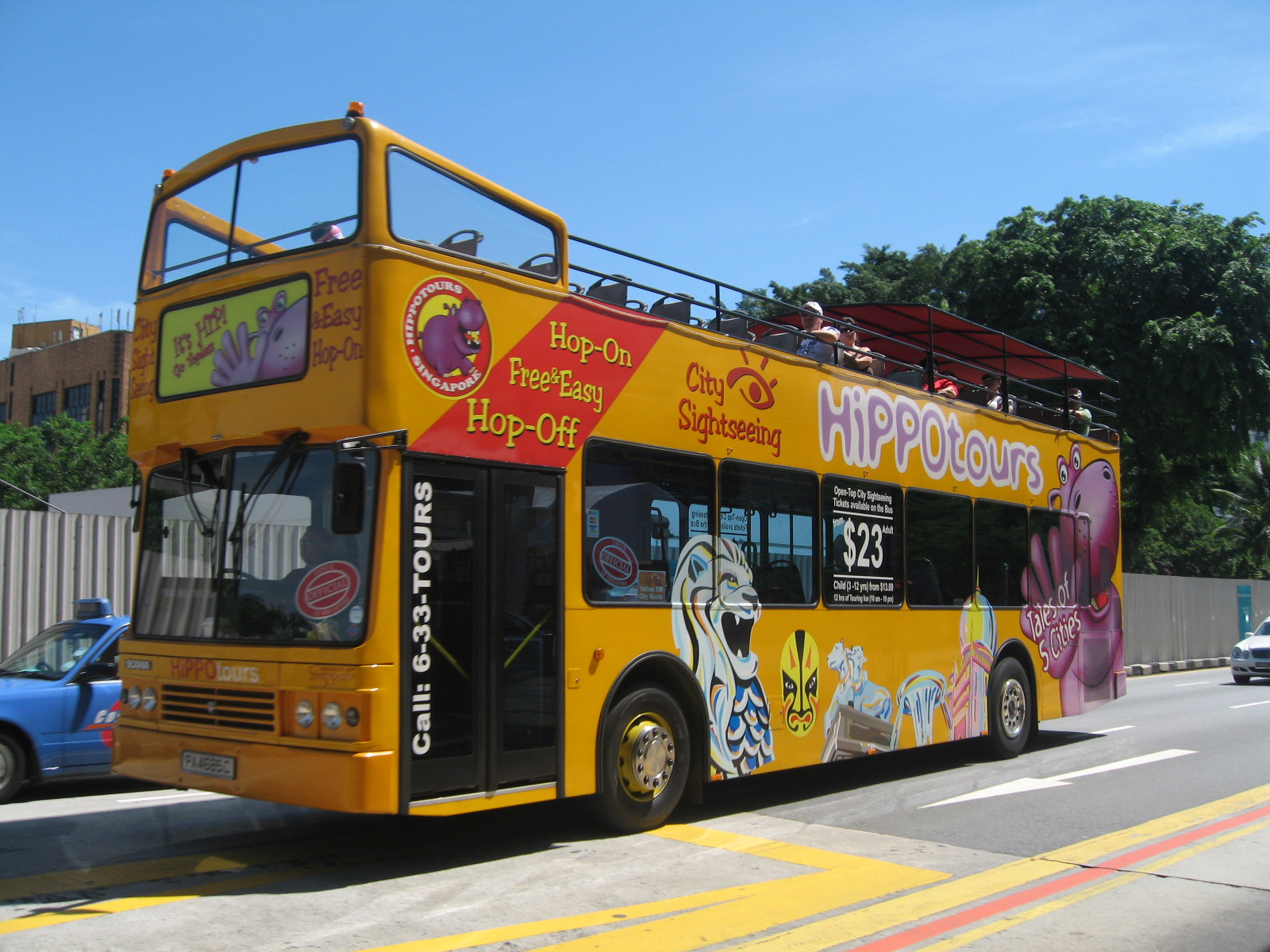
Hippo Tours operation in Singapore in May 2006

City Sightseeing is a sightseeing tour bus operator. It provides tour bus services in more than 130 cities around the world. As City Sightseeing has grown and expanded, the company now also provides boat tours, sightseeing train tours, and guided walking tours.

The buses pass by main tourist attractions and major landmarks, while a prerecorded audio commentary is provided through headphones in multiple languages giving important facts and information about what is being seen. Many tours also have a live guide. Tourists may board and leave the buses within their ticket's time limit at the different bus stops on the circular routes. This is called hop-on-hop-off. Many cities have more than one route to showcase all the different sights and attractions. On some routes, buses leave the city for suburban sights. In some cities (New York City, Philadelphia, Sharjah) buses also operate at night. In some cities (Moscow, Cape Town, Amsterdam, Boston) a boat tour is available. The United Kingdom, Italy, Spain, and the United States are the countries with the largest number of cities with City Sightseeing service.

Each city has different ticketing options available, which range from a 24-hour pass to a 14-day pass. Furthermore, many tours include discounts for local attractions and restaurants. There are bundle packs, where customers can buy tickets for several attractions when they purchase a bus or boat ticket. In 2015, more than 14 million tourists hopped-on a City Sightseeing tour.

In 2015, US officials raised safety concerns about City Sightseeing tours after certain irregularities were discovered and a major crash occurred in San Francisco.

== Company history ==
The City Sightseeing name was first used in 1972 after Peter Newman used it for his City Coach Lines company, which ran tours of London four times a day.

In 1998, Ensignbus revived the name and developed the red livery in the Spanish city of Seville. There it helped an established sightseeing operator relaunch itself with double-deckers, using the experience and expertise developed with London Pride Sightseeing, through Ensignbus' vehicle business. With the sale of the London Pride Sightseeing, Peter Newman stated his intention to introduce a global brand of sightseeing buses. It also set up operations in Sydney, Australia, not as a franchise, but directly owned, during this year.

In March 2000, the franchise model was initiated, with tours starting in Glasgow, Scotland. Startup operations employed a British manager until local staff were trained. During this year, operations expanded in the UK in York, Edinburgh, and Bath. Edinburgh's Lothian Buses introduced the first purpose-built open top low floor buses. In December of that year, the online booking system was introduced.

In 2001, operations expanded further in the UK, Spain, Australia, and into Copenhagen, Denmark.

In 2002, operations in Alberta, Canada opened but have since closed. Ensignbus acquired City Sightseeing's biggest rival, Guide Friday, which had a base in Stratford-upon-Avon and operated tours across the UK and in major European cities. Operations were either rebranded as City Sightseeing, or absorbed into existing operators where Guide Friday had been a direct competitor. The acquisition brought City Sightseeing's operations up to nearly 70 cities worldwide with nearly 250 vehicles.

In 2003, operations started in Italy. During this year, City Sightseeing introduced the first purpose-built sightseeing bus. It was an Ayats Bravo City bodied Volvo B7Ls. They featured equipment specifically designed for tours and were "low floor". These appeared first in Spain and then in the UK. By 2004 they were featured around the world.

Since 2004, the company has been part of Singapore Ducktours, sold to RATP Group in September 2014. Both London and Singapore's City Sightseeing operations are under Extrapolitan Sightseeing Group. Extrapolitan had transferred City Sightseeing's operations to Julia Travel for both London and Singapore in 2023, and for Singapore's case Julia Travel has collaborated with Gojek.

Ensignbus owned the operations in Bath, Cardiff, Eastbourne and Windsor until its subsidiary, Bath Bus Company, was sold to the RATP Group in February 2011. It also owned the operation in Cambridge and Stratford-upon-Avon, but these were passed to Stagecoach, who also provided normal bus services in that area.

In 2011, Ensignbus sold its 100% ownership of the business to the Spanish franchisee Enrique Ybarra's City Sightseeing Worldwide of Spain.

Ensignbus retained its ownership of City Sightseeing in Sydney, but sold its interest in City Sightseeing Italy and its shareholding in Washington, D.C. This was sold to Big Bus Tours in September 2011. Sydney, along with several other locations, including Munich, Frankfurt, Perth and Bristol have all left City Sightseeing, and now operate independently. The Mornington Peninsula service which commenced 1 November 2014, ceased on 25 January 2015.

== Operations ==
According to its website in July 2025, City Sightseeing had operations in 84 cities in 30 countries.

Country	City	Operator
Canada	Toronto	
Colombia	Cartagena (Colombia)	
Croatia	Split	
Czech Republic	Prague	
Denmark	Copenhagen	
Estonia	Tallinn	
Finland	Helsinki	
France	Paris	Big Bus Tours
France	Nice	Le Grand Tour
Greece	Athens	
Greece	Corfu	
Greece	Thessalonki	
Germany	Berlin	
Germany	Kiel	
Germany	Potsdam	
Germany	Cologne	CityTour
Hungary	Budapest	
Iceland	Reykjavik	
Ireland	Dublin	Julia Travel
Ireland	Galway	
Lebanon	Beirut	
Malta	Gozo	
Malta	Malta	
Netherlands	Amsterdam	
Norway	Alesund	
Norway	Bergen	
Norway	Geiranger	
Norway	Oslo	
Norway	Stavanger	
Norway	Haugesund	
Norway	Kristiansand	
Poland	Warsaw	
Poland	Krakow	WOWKrakow!
Portugal	Funchal	
Portugal	Porto	
Portugal	Lisbon	
Panama	Panama City	
Sweden	Stockholm	
Sweden	Gothenburg	
Sweden	Visby	
Saudi Arabia	Medina	
Singapore	Singapore	Julia Travel-Gojek
South Africa	Cape Town	
South Africa	Johannesburg	
Spain	Seville	
Spain	Barcelona	
Spain	Benalmadena	
Spain	Cadiz	
Spain	Cordoba	
Spain	Las Palmas de Gran Canaria	
Spain	Malaga	
Spain	Palma de Mallorca	
Spain	Santander	
Spain	Toledo	
Spain	Madrid	
Thailand	Bangkok	
Thailand	Pattaya	
United Arab Emirates	Dubai	
United Arab Emirates	Sharjah	
United Arab Emirates	Abu Dhabi	
United Kingdom	Bath	First West of England
United Kingdom	Belfast	
United Kingdom	Bournemouth	
United Kingdom	Brighton	
United Kingdom	Cambridge	Stagecoach East
United Kingdom	Chester	Stagecoach Merseyside and South Lancashire
United Kingdom	Edinburgh	
United Kingdom	Glasgow	West Coast Motors
United Kingdom	Inverness	
United Kingdom	Llandudno	
United Kingdom	London	Julia Travel
United Kingdom	Oxford	
United Kingdom	Stratford-upon-Avon	Stagecoach Midlands
United Kingdom	York	
United States	Los Angeles	
United States	New Orleans	
United States	New York City	Big Bus Tours
United States	Philadelphia	
United States	San Francisco	
United States	Seattle	
Vietnam	Hanoi	
Vietnam	Saigon	
Vietnam	Da Lat	
Vietnam	Ha Long	
Vietnam	Hue	

== Safety issues ==
In November 2015, a City Sightseeing bus injured 20 people in a crash at Union Square, San Francisco. The police concluded that this was due to driver error, although the driver maintained that the brakes had failed.

A city official questioned the safety of City Sightseeing tours, and the California Public Utilities Commission released a statement describing various irregularities and problems with City Sightseeing, including multiple permit suspensions since 2007 due to security infractions.

== Franchise model ==
The company has been largely developed along the franchise model. Some operations were completely owned by City Sightseeing, while some were joint ventures; however, the majority of tours are now operated by franchisees.

At a minimum, the franchise operator must use the City Sightseeing red base colour and graffiti style. They must use the global booking website, though many operate their own websites as well, and a percentage of the revenue is paid to City Sightseeing.

== See also ==
- Big Bus Tours
- Gray Line
- City Sightseeing Cape Town
- New York Skyride
- Sightseeing
