= Open top bus =

Bus, usually a double-decker bus, without a roof

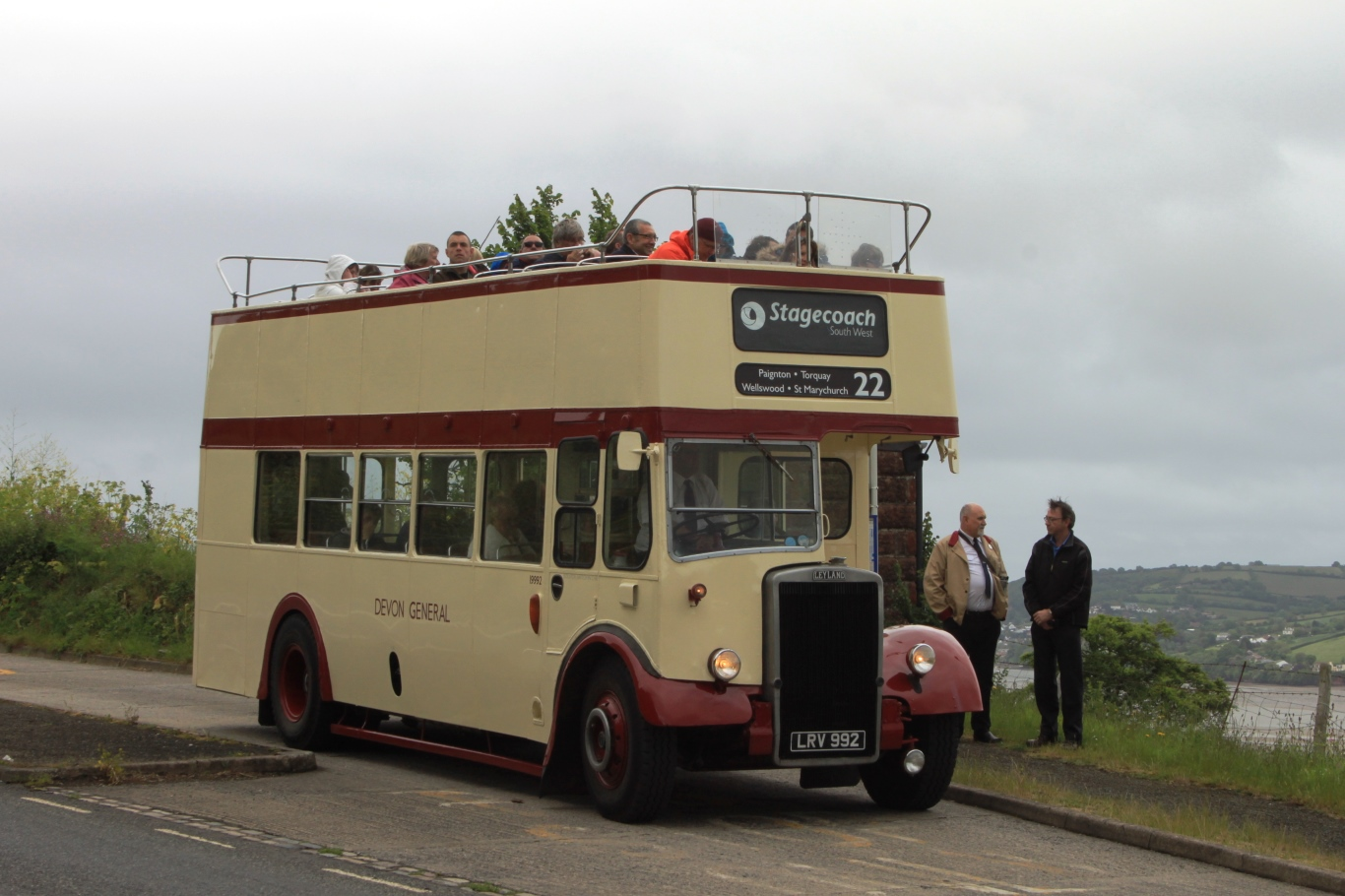
Passengers on board an old Leyland Titan open-top bus view the scenery in Devon.

An open top bus is a bus, usually but not exclusively a double-decker bus, which has been built or modified to operate without a roof. Early buses were constructed without roofs but in more recent times they have only been built for tourist and sightseeing services. Some are made by removing all or part of the roof from a more conventional bus.

== Use ==
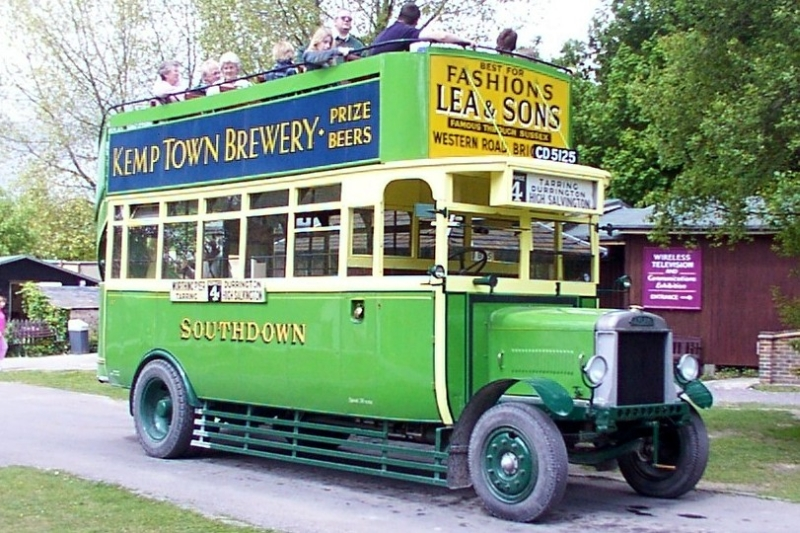
An early open top bus in Southdown livery

When double-decker buses were first introduced in Britain, they did not carry roofs, similar to older horse carriages, and were not allowed to have one until the 1920s. Following the lifting of the prohibition, bus operators would use buses with roofs fitted due to climate conditions. However, some seaside towns retained a few open-top buses in their fleet for use on seasonal sightseeing services.

Open-top buses are now primarily used as tour buses for sightseeing in cities and seaside towns, or around rural monuments or areas of special interest. These often include specialist information equipment, and colourful liveries illustrating the route.

Open-top buses are used in some regions on regular public transport transit bus services, in warm climates, or as seasonal services in temperate climates. Seasonal services are often in seaside towns, or along rural or coastal routes of particular scenic quality.

Open-top buses are often used for victory parades for sport teams, and as temporary viewing platforms at events such as The Derby. Vintage open-toppers can also be hired for events such as weddings. They may be used by notable people in a parade to ensure maximum visibility; this may be a security concern as with open-top cars; in 2009 an open-top bus carrying the Dutch royal family was attacked by an assailant.

== Types ==
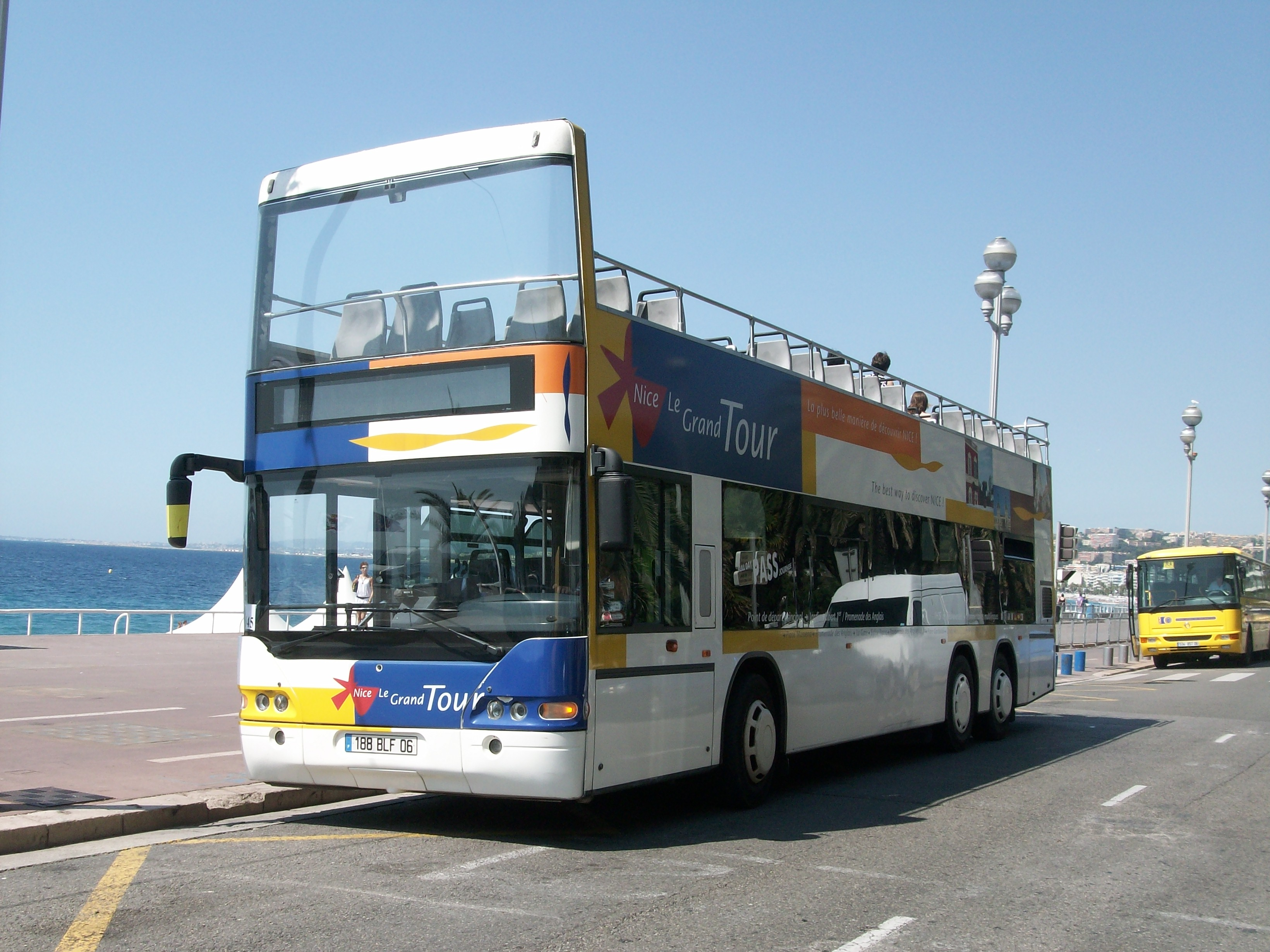
A modern purpose-built open top sightseeing bus in France

The traditional tour bus open topper was usually either a restored heritage bus, or a converted standard bus. Sometimes the bus is converted if its top has been damaged by hitting a low obstacle e.g. a bridge. Tour operators sometimes export a double-decker bus from the United Kingdom, and convert it to an open top bus. This is to give the impression of an archetypal British bus, such as the AEC Routemaster London bus, although often the bus actually purchased is not a Routemaster.

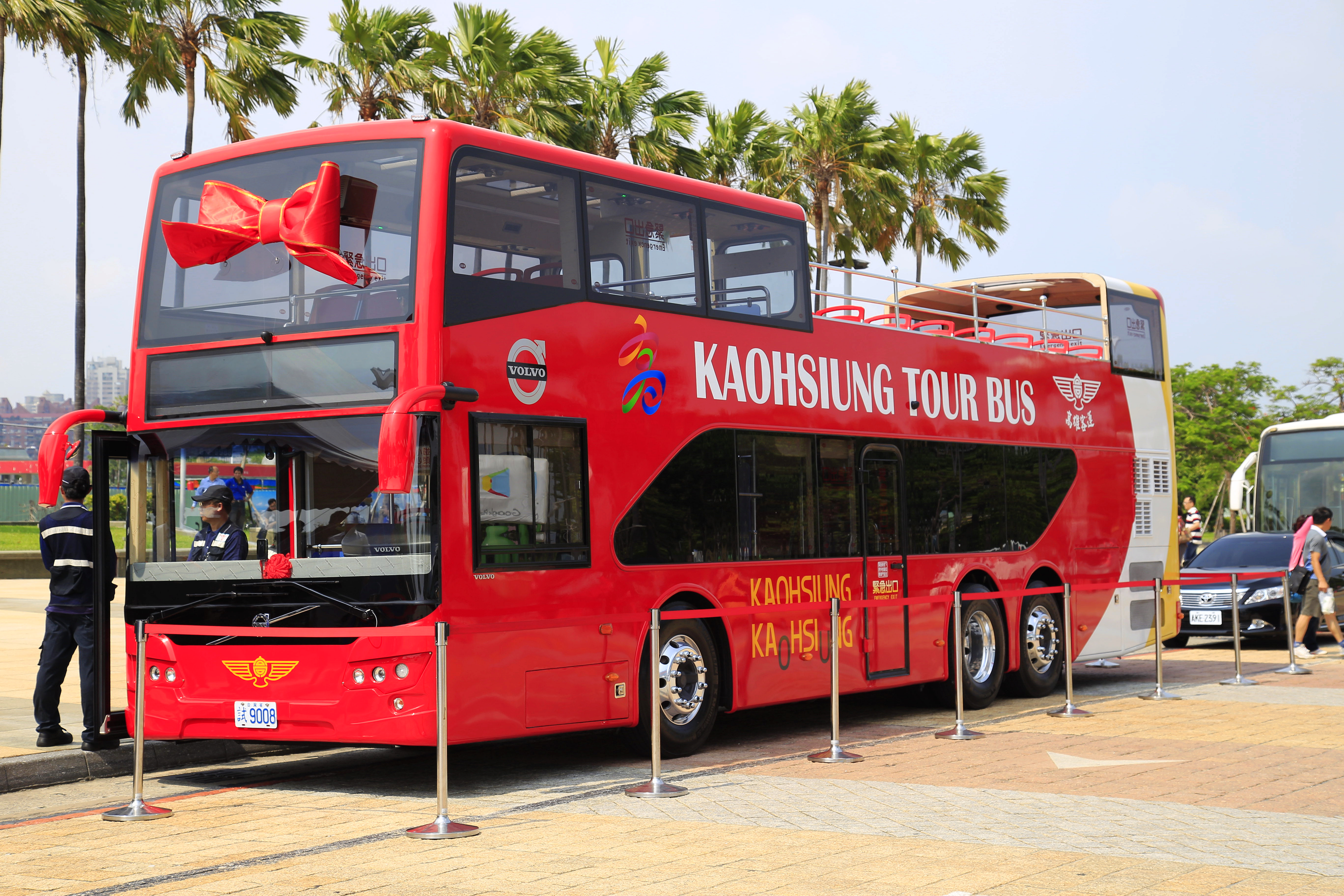
A semi-open top sightseeing bus in Kaohsiung, Taiwan

Modern open top bus designs are available, nowadays with long multiple axle and low floor easy access features as seen on conventional closed-top buses. Many more have been converted from conventional buses which were no longer required for regular service and so may not have such features.

The open deck in an open top bus may have the roof partially or fully removed, with a guard rail. An intact roof section may be left at the front or rear, and the full/half window height may remain in the open sections. Some open top buses have a re-fittable roof section, for fitting in inclement weather. Some may also have weather-proof upper deck seats.

== See also ==
- Open top buses in the United Kingdom
- List of buses
