= MCW Metroliner =

Step entrance single and double-decker coach

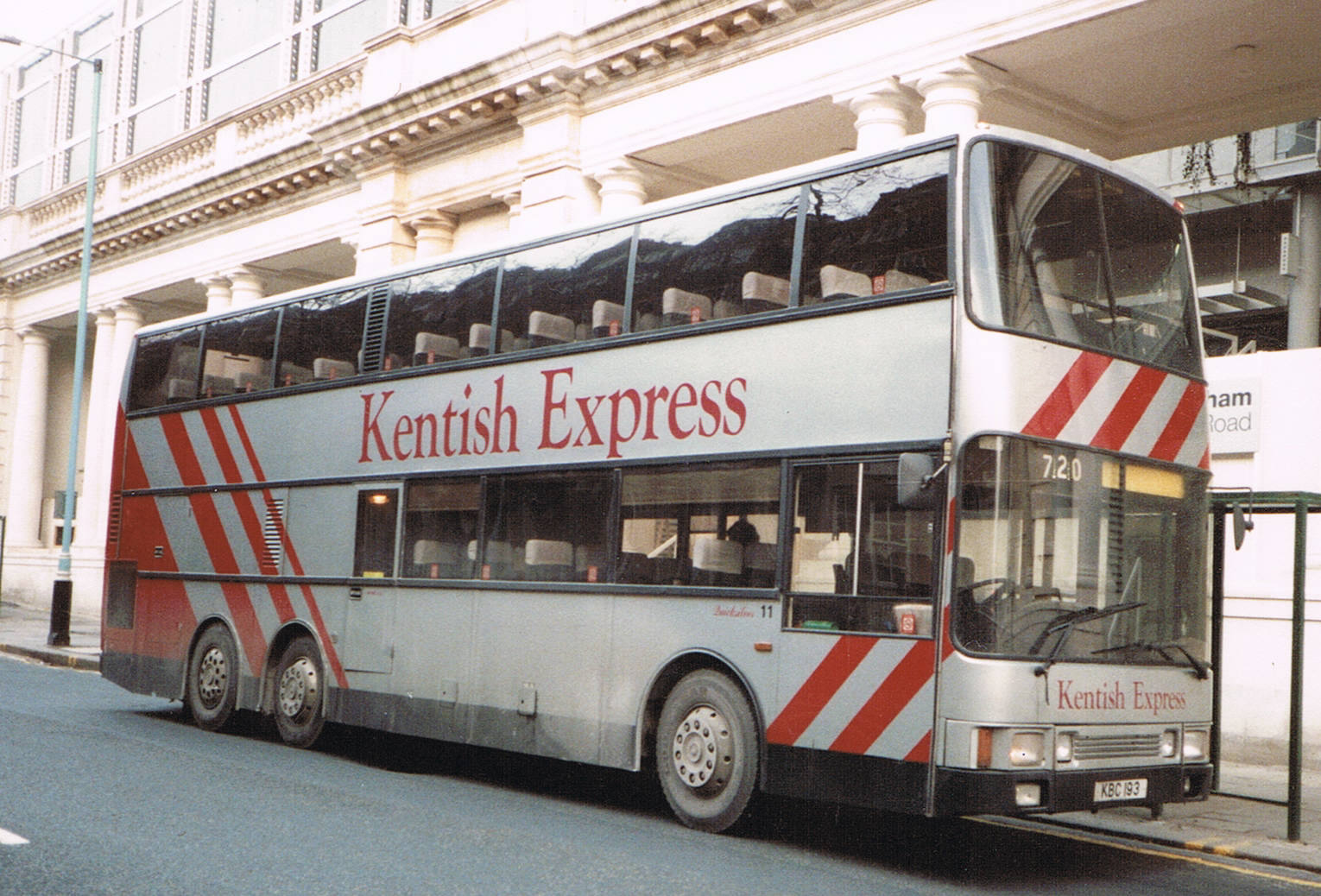
- Kentish Bus MCW Metroliner DR130 on Buckingham Palace Road in London

Overview
- Manufacturer: Metro Cammell Weymann
- Production: 1983–1988

Body and chassis
- Class: Coach
- Doors: 1 or 2
- Floor type: Step entrance
- Chassis: Integral
- Related: MCW Metrobus

Powertrain
- Engine: Cummins L10; Gardner 6LYT
- Capacity: 47-69 seated
- Power output: CR126; 250 horsepower (190 kW); DR130; 290 horsepower (220 kW)
- Transmission: Voith DIWA D864G 4-speed automatic ZF 6-speed manual

Dimensions
- Length: 9.7–10.5 metres (32–34 ft)
- Height: DR130; 4.23 metres (13.9 ft); HR131 'Metro-Hi-Liner'; 3.36 metres (11.0 ft); DR140 '400GT'; 4 metres (13 ft)

The MCW Metroliner was an integral coach manufactured by Metro Cammell Weymann (MCW) between 1983 and 1988.

Launched by MCW in April 1983 ahead of the 1984 tourist season as the company attempted to diversify its manufacturing business away from orders by the passenger transport executives of the United Kingdom, the Metroliner was available as a standard single-deck coach or a tri-axle double-deck coach based on the tri-axle MCW Metrobus chassis, predominantly for service in the United Kingdom with nationalised bus operators National Bus Company (NBC) and Scottish Bus Group (SBG) for their long-distance coach National Express and Scottish Citylink express services.

== Variants ==
A total of 172 Metroliners were built across four different variants:

=== CR126 ===
Only 21 of the original style of single deck Metroliner were built between 1983 and 1984, with 15 delivered to NBC subsidiaries East Kent and Eastern National for the NBC's regional National Holidays package holiday divisions, four being delivered to SBG subsidiaries Eastern Scottish and Northern Scottish, and the remaining two delivered to Strathclyde PTE, these being modified with wheelchair lifts for use on two twice-weekly accessible services between Glasgow city centre and Paisley as well as southwestern city suburbs until early 1985. The final ten CR126s had a revised front with less angular styling.

=== DR130 ===
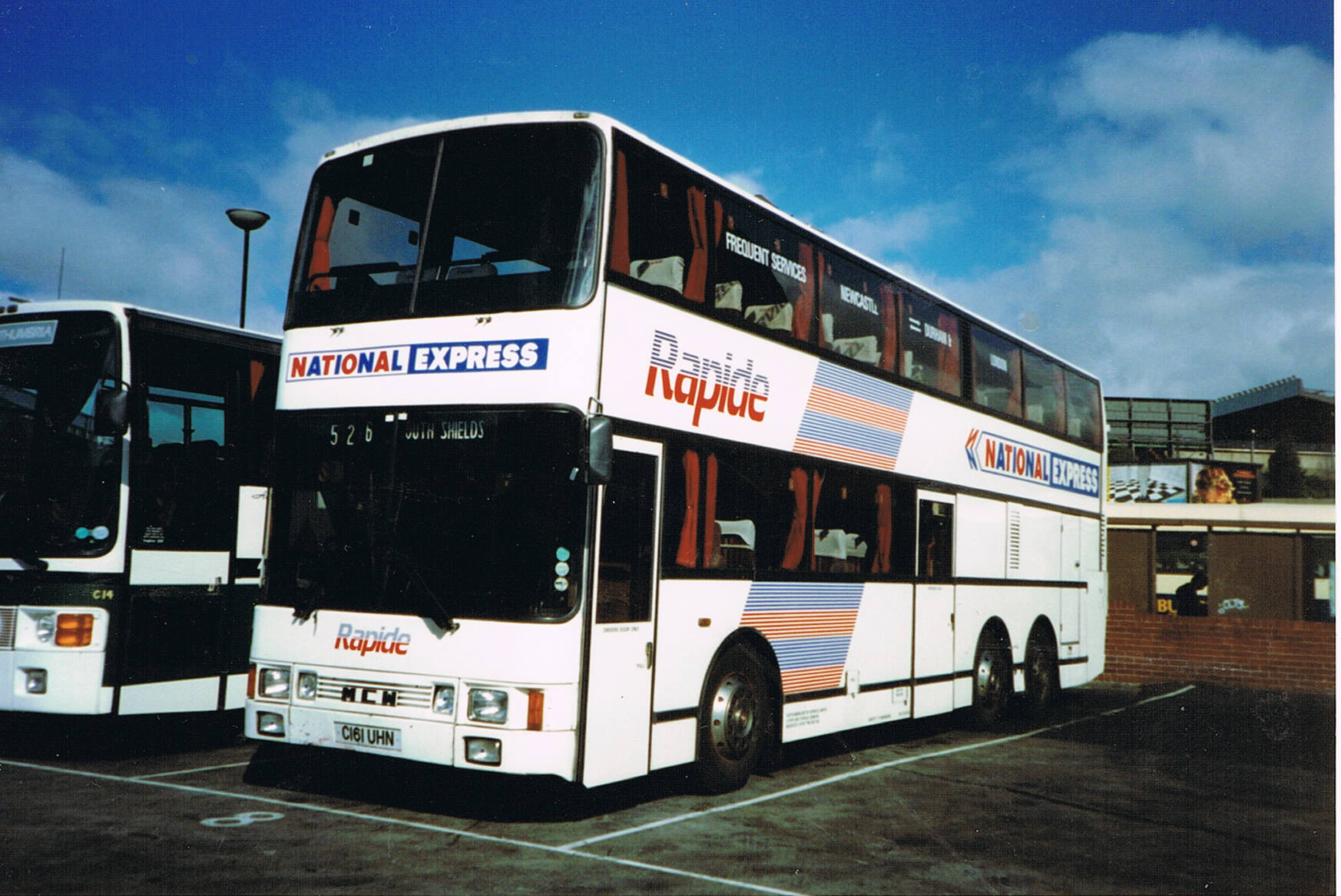
National Express 'Rapide' MCW Metroliner DR130 operated by Northumbria Motor Services

The most numerous type of Metroliner was the double deck DR130 design. This was designed specifically for express coach services in the United Kingdom and thus differed from contemporary double-deck coaches in its height: most double-deck coaches are built to under 4 metres (13 ft) in height as this is the maximum permitted in continental Europe, but this severely limits the interior headroom. The DR130 was higher, allowing a much more spacious interior but making the design unsuitable for continental tours and limiting its appeal on the secondhand market.

In total, 127 Metroliner DR130s were built between 1983 and 1987, with the first DR130 delivered to the SBG as a demonstrator for Scottish Citylink services between London and Glasgow; ultimately, a further eleven DR130s would be built for SBG subsidiaries Eastern Scottish, Northern Scottish, and Western Scottish. The DR130 was most popular with various NBC subsidiaries for National Express and National Holidays work, with a total of 102 built, most to the company's 'Rapide' specification, throughout the Metroliner's production run. Deliveries of DR130s outside of both groups for long-distance express services to London, which had been deregulated in 1980, included a combined seven for the London Buses and West Midlands Travel London Liner joint operation, serving London and Birmingham, as well as six for Tyne & Wear PTE's Armstrong Galley Clipper service, serving London and Newcastle upon Tyne via Washington.

Due to the limited demand for older double-deck coaches and the high seating capacity on the upper deck, many double-deck Metroliner DR130s were converted to open-top buses by Ensignbus, mainly for use on their London Pride Sightseeing operation.

=== HR131 'Metro Hi-Liner' ===
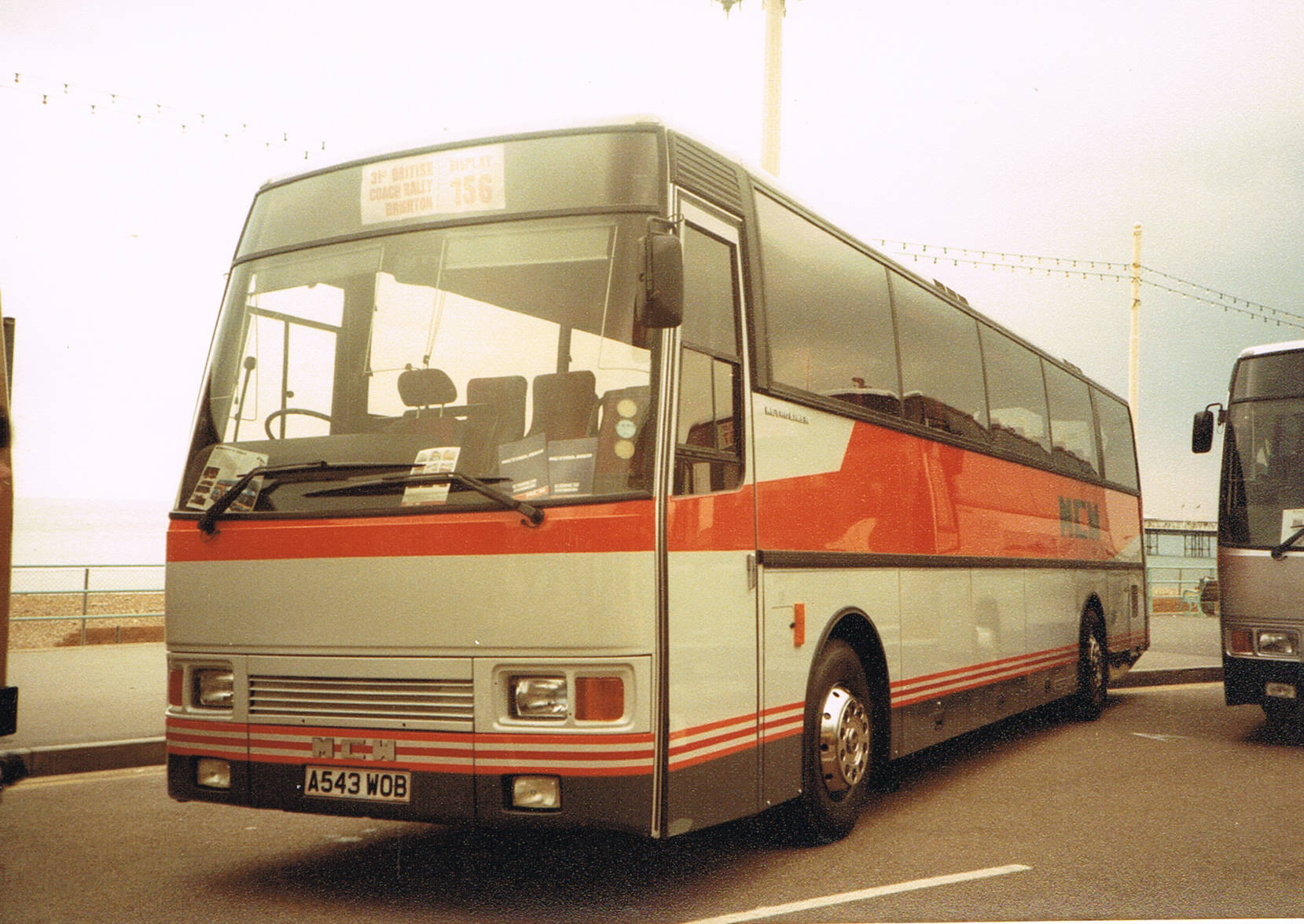
Demonstrator MCW Metroliner HR131 at the Brighton Coach Rally

Marketed by MCW as the Metro Hi-Liner, the single deck HR131 was built on an integral high-floor chassis in comparison to the original body-on-frame CR126 model. All were built with revised frontal styling that would later be introduced on the CR126. Sales of HR131 Metro Hi-Liners amounted to 21, which were built between 1983 and 1988. MCW operated the first Hi-Liner as a type demonstrator, with operators who took delivery of the Hi-Liner including seven for SBG subsidiary for Northern Scottish, six for NBC subsidiaries East Kent, East Midland and Wessex, four for Premier Travel, two for Grampian Regional Transport, and a single example for WMT Central Coachways.

=== DR140 'Metroliner 400GT' ===
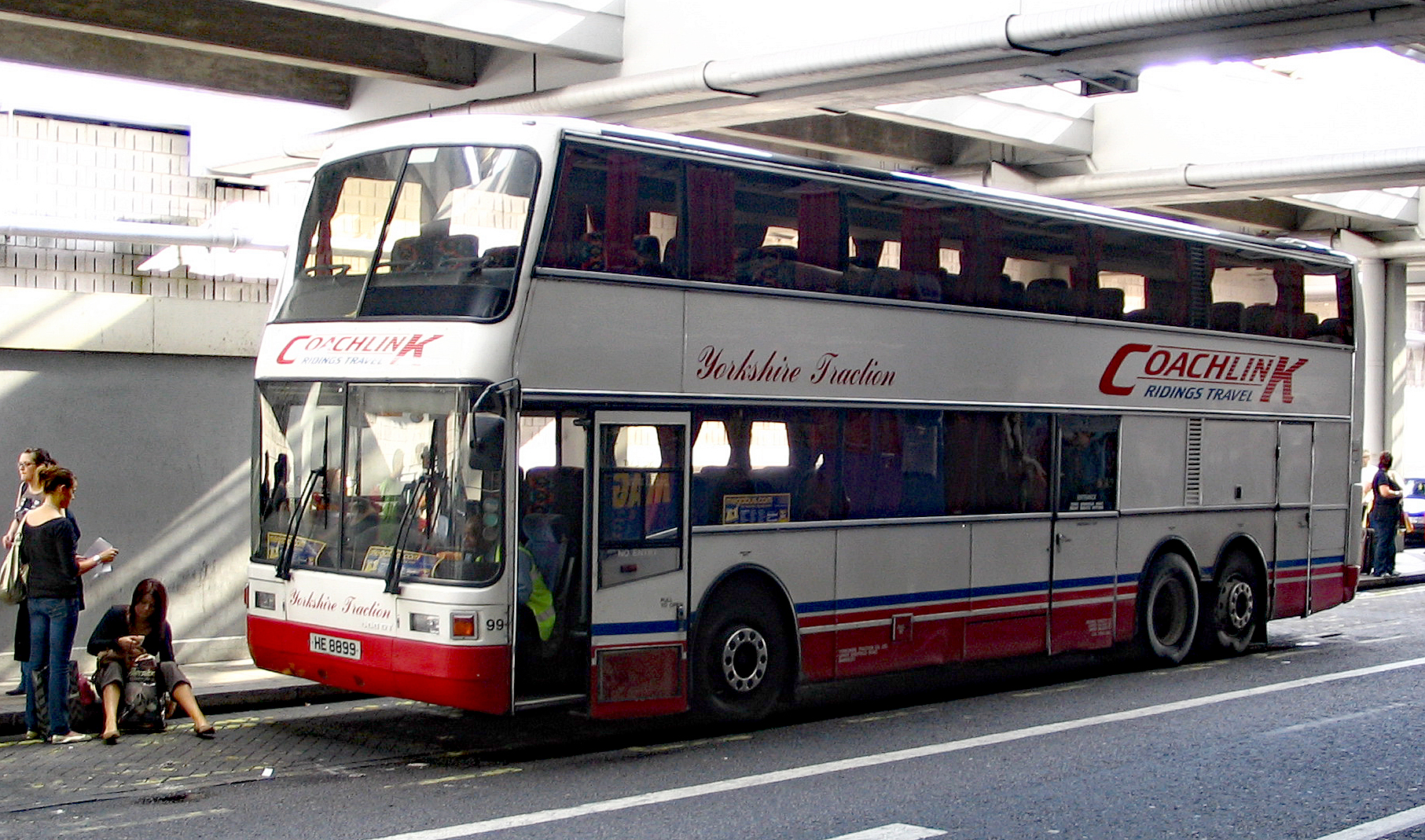
Yorkshire Traction MCW Metroliner DR140 at Green Line Coach Station

In an effort to broaden the appeal of the double-deck coach, a 4 metres (13 ft) high version was offered with sleeker styling. Marketed by MCW as the Metroliner 400GT, this was the rarest Metroliner variant with only three examples built between 1987 and 1988. Two went to Central Coachways, one of which had initially been a demonstrator, whilst Yorkshire Traction took the third.
