= Murrays =

Australian commercial intercity bus company

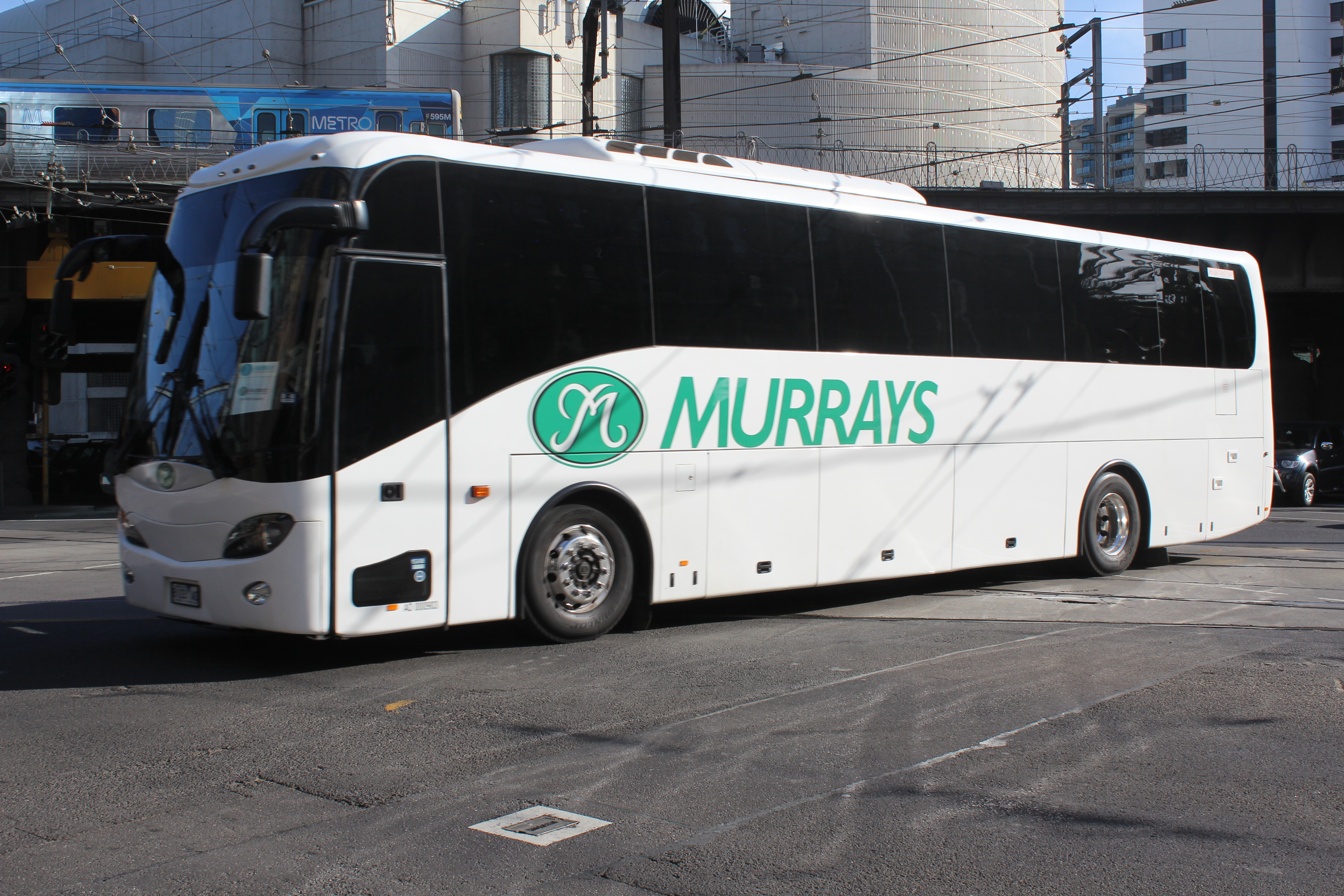
- BCI JXK6127 on Flinders Street, Melbourne in October 2013
- Parent: Ron Murray
- Founded: 1950s
- Headquarters: Red Hill
- Service area: Canberra; Gold Coast; Melbourne; Southern New South Wales; Sydney; Queensland
- Service type: Coach operator
- Routes: 4
- Depots: Canberra; Melbourne; Sydney; Gold Coast; Brisbane; Chinchilla
- Fleet: 199 (January 2020)
- Website: www.murrays.com.au

Murrays Coaches is an Australian express and coach charter company.

== History ==
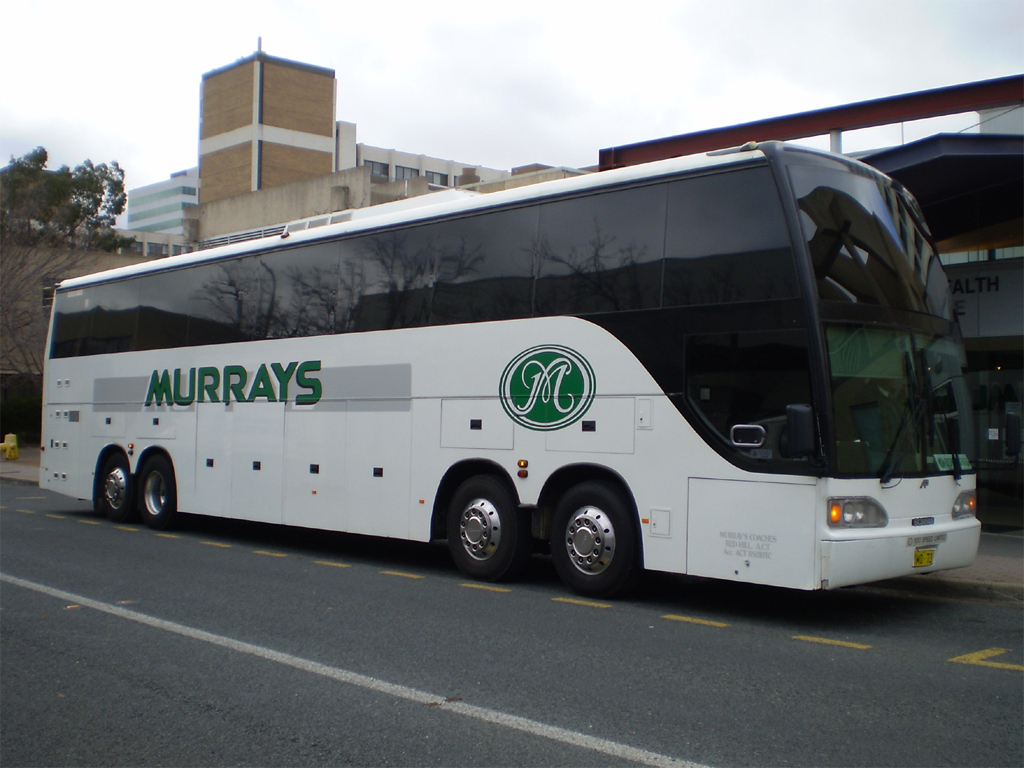
Austral Pacific bodied Scania K113TRBL at the Jolimont Centre

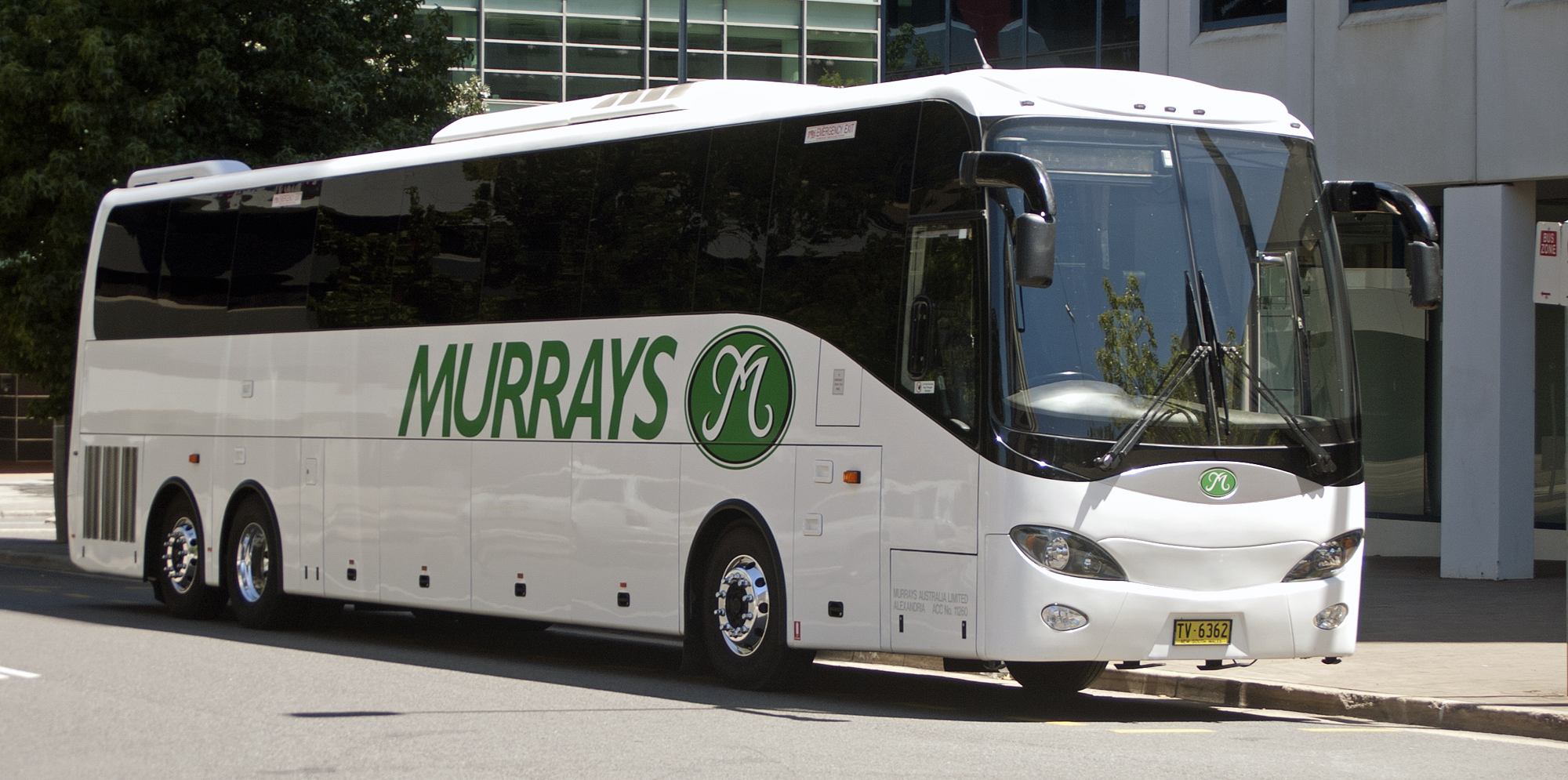
BCI JXK6137 in Canberra in January 2011

Murrays was founded by Bill Murray in the early 1950s as a school bus operator in Canberra. The operation was taken over by Ron Murray in 1970 by which time it was operating services to Captains Flat, Kowen Forest, Naas, Tidbinbilla, Uriarra and Williamsdale with 10 buses. Murrays were operating seven school buses when the services were taken over by Deane's Buslines in November 1997.

At some point Murrays diversified into coach operation, initially to the Snowy Mountains. By the mid-1980s Murrays were operating interstate services from Canberra to Sydney, Wollongong and Narooma. These services continue today.

In May 1979, Murrays purchased Sydney bus routes 6 Arncliffe to Earlwood and 49 Carlton to Rockdale. These were sold in October 1982 to Brighton Bus Lines after the laws requiring tourist vehicle licences to be attached to route service operators were relaxed.

In late 1988, an operation commenced on the Gold Coast followed in 1989 by Melbourne.

Murrays expanded rapidly in the early 1990s, capitalising on the growth of inbound tourism and the departure of some of its rivals. In May 1998 the Koala Tours business in Sydney was purchased.

In May 2015, Murrays commenced operating a service in Queensland from Miles to Brisbane Airport.

== Fleet ==
Murrays initial coach fleet was built up with ex Ansett Pioneer GMC PD4107s and Mercedes-Benz O302 and O303s. In the mid 1980s Murrays purchased a number of new Mercedes-Benz, Volvo and Austral coaches.

Following the collapse of Deluxe Coachlines and Sunliner Express amongst others, Murrays was able to renew its fleet with large numbers of near-new Austral, Denning and Scania coaches. In the mid-1990s it took delivery of 120 PMC Australia bodied MANs and Scanias.

Between 2008 and 2011, Murrays conducted a major fleet renewal purchasing over 60 BCI coaches. As at January 2020, the fleet consisted of 199 vehicles.

Until the early 1990s, Murrays had a livery of three greens and black when a new livery of white with green signwriting was adopted.
