= London Pride Sightseeing =

British bus operating company

- Founded: March 1973
- Ceased operation: November 2000
- Service area: Greater London
- Fleet: MCW Metroliner

London Pride Sightseeing was an open top sightseeing bus operator in London.

== History ==
In 1983, the state owned London Transport ceased operating their Round London Sightseeing Tour operation as the market was opened up to competition by the government. This had been run since March 1973.

A number of companies established private tour bus companies in London. In 1984, Emmerheath Ltd., one such private operator, established the Grand Guided Tour of London as London Pride Sightseeing, with a white/pink/orange livery, a small operation with 10 buses and operating from one stop.

In 1985 London Pride merged with Ensignbus, who had also started their own tour operation, with Emmerheath buses being repainted into Ensignbus standard blue/silver, with London Pride markings.

Ensign had a competitive advantage with its ready supply of Fleetlines being disposed of early by London Transport into its sales business. As part of this, Ensign had developed expertise in half and full open-top conversion of these vehicles. Ensignbus had earlier operated brand-new DMS-class Fleetlines under contract on the Round London Sightseeing Tour.

Ensign went on to develop London Pride with the open-top vehicles, multiple stops, 24-hour operation and tickets, shuttle buses, different routes and attraction tie-ins. It also introduced the use of high capacity tri-axle coach vehicle on open-top operation, such as the MCW Metroliner.

After the sale of the Ensign's London tendered routes to Capital Citybus, London Pride gained a dedicated plum/silver version of Ensignbus livery, and prominent This is an official London Sightseeing bus markings.

From 1985, and into the 1990s, most of the other tour operators in London either ceased trading, or sold out to Ensign (Culture Bus, Ebdon's, London Tour Co, London Hop on Hop off Ltd and Cityrama), leaving only London Pride and The Big Bus Company in the market.

In 1998, the expanded London Pride operation was sold by Ensign to a private consortium. Following London Pride, Ensign went on to produce the City Sightseeing global franchise model, starting tours around the world. After London Pride's new owners failed to grow the business, it was sold back to Ensignbus in November 2000. Ensign proceeded to transform London Pride into a City Sightseeing operation. In March 2001, Ensign sold this London City Sightseeing operation to Arriva along the franchise operator model, with Ensign retaining vehicles, property and engineering staff to further develop the brand elsewhere. Arriva merged it into their London tour operator The Original Tour.

== See also ==
- Ensignbus
- The Original Tour
- City Sightseeing
