= BCI Citirider =

Low entry and low-floor single and double-decker bus range

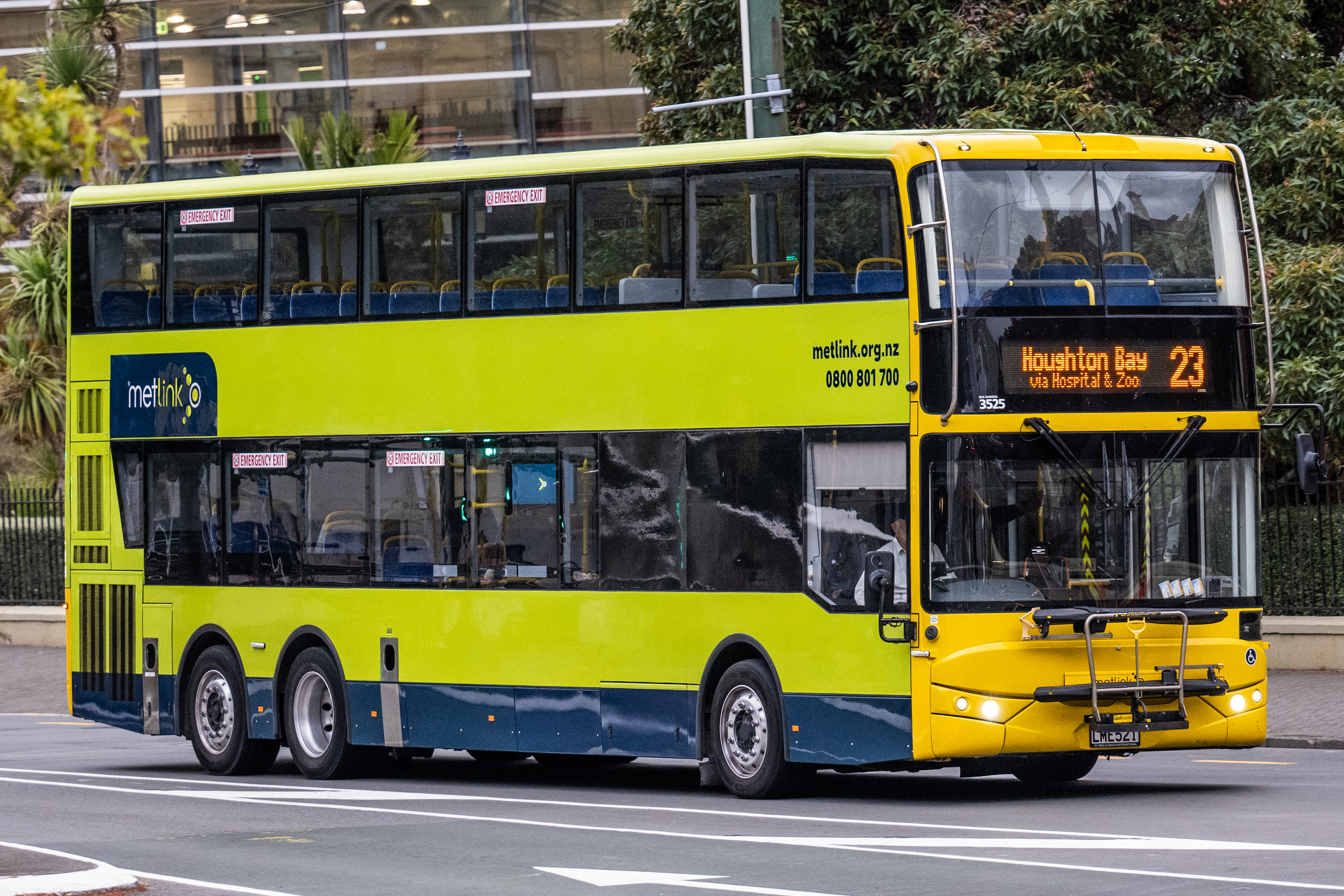
- Metlink Wellington tri-axle double-decker BCI Citirider on Lambton Quay in Wellington in February 2024

Overview
- Manufacturer: BCI Bus
- Production: 2015–present
- Assembly: Xiamen, Fujian Province, China

Body and chassis
- Class: Complete bus
- Body style: Twin-axle single-deck bus Twin-axle double-decker bus Tri-axle double-decker bus
- Doors: 1–3
- Floor type: Low floor (double-decker); Low entry (single-deck)
- Chassis: Integral

Powertrain
- Engine: Cummins ISB (2-axle double deck); Cummins ISL (3-axle double deck); Weichai
- Capacity: 26-99 seated
- Transmission: Allison; Voith DIWA; ZF EcoLife; Vantage Power (hybrid)

Dimensions
- Length: 8–12 metres (26–39 ft)
- Width: 2.5 metres (8 ft 2 in)
- Height: 4.4 metres (14 ft) (double-decker); 3 metres (9.8 ft) (single-deck)

The BCI Citirider is an integrally-constructed high-capacity low-floor and low-entry single-deck and double-decker bus produced by BCI Bus since 2015. It is produced at BCI Bus' manufacturing facility in Xiamen, China. The double-decker bus, imported by bus dealer Ensignbus, is marketed as both the BCI Excellence and BCI Enterprise in the United Kingdom.

== Design ==
Launched in 2015 initially for the Australasian bus and coach market, the BCI Citirider single-deck bus was designed as a low-entry city bus suitable for both public bus and school bus operations. Assembled on an Alcoa aluminium frame, the front and rear fascias of the bus are made from fibreglass, while the side panels are all aluminium with bolts for ease of maintenance and replacement. BCI Citiriders also have a choice of a glass or aluminium roof. In 2016, a low-floor double-decker variant of the Citirider, available on either a twin-axle or tri-axle chassis, was launched.

The BCI Enterprise was launched in the United Kingdom by Purfleet bus dealer and importer Ensignbus in July 2016. Built as standard with air conditioning, the Enterprise seats 98 passengers and differs by having a redesigned front fascia and a curved staircase as opposed to the Citirider's straight staircase. A twin-axle variant, marketed as the BCI Excellence, was launched by Ensignbus shortly afterwards.

A battery-electric single-deck variant, known as the Citirider E, was launched at the BusVic 2019 conference in Sydney in October 2019, developed in close partnership with Dutch electric bus manufacturer Ebusco. Capable of a range of up to 350 kilometres (220 mi) on a single charge and featuring 12 battery packs capable of 400 kWh of battery storage, the Citirider E also featured a restyled exterior and interior with a maximum carrying capacity of 45 seated and 20 standing passengers.

== Operators ==
=== Australasia ===
South Western Sydney bus operator Interline Bus Services took delivery of ten Citirider Es in February 2021, which were later transferred to Transit Systems NSW. In 2024, Transit Systems ordered an additional 60 Citirider 12s.

In New Zealand, Ritchies Transport operate 43 single deckers and 26 double decker BCI Citiriders, Kinetic Group's urban operation, NZ Bus operate 14 double decker Citiriders, and Tranzit Group's urban operation, Tranzurban operate 55 single deckers and 47 double decker Citiriders. In 2021, Tranzurban converted a BCI Citirider double-decker from diesel to electric power with a range of up to 230 km (140 mi) for use in the capital, Wellington, briefly being trialled in Auckland during July 2022. Later, a BCI Citirider single-decker was converted from diesel to electric power for use in Wellington as well. Ritchies Transport also operate 21 Scania K320UB6 tag axle single-decker buses bodied by BCI using the Citirider body.

Tranzurban have transferred three of its Wellington BCI Citirider DD's to Auckland to assist operations at its two Northern depots at Brigham Creek and Dairy Flat. Notably, TR3501, their power converted Double Decker, was sent up to work out of Brigham Creek Depot on Western Express services (WX1), with two diesel Double Deckers, TR3506 and TR3520, sent up to work out of Dairy Flat Depot on Northern Express services (NX2). AS of mid-May 2026, TR3501 was sent to Dairy Flat and is now also working on NX2 services.

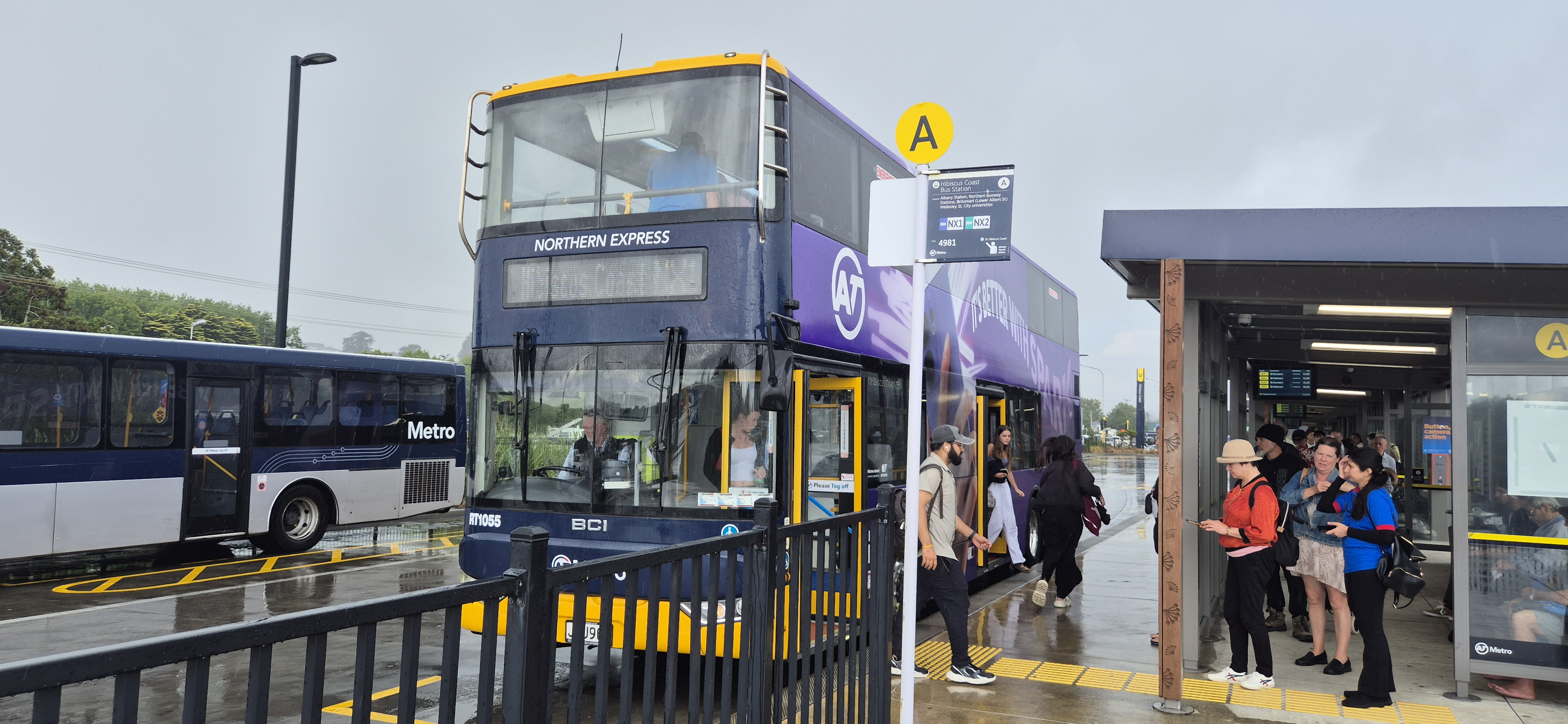
RT1055 with NX1 at Hibiscus Coast Station. With an older face, double-leaf front and rear doors, and Fainsa seats. Notably, it has a seat opposite the driver behind the front door set.

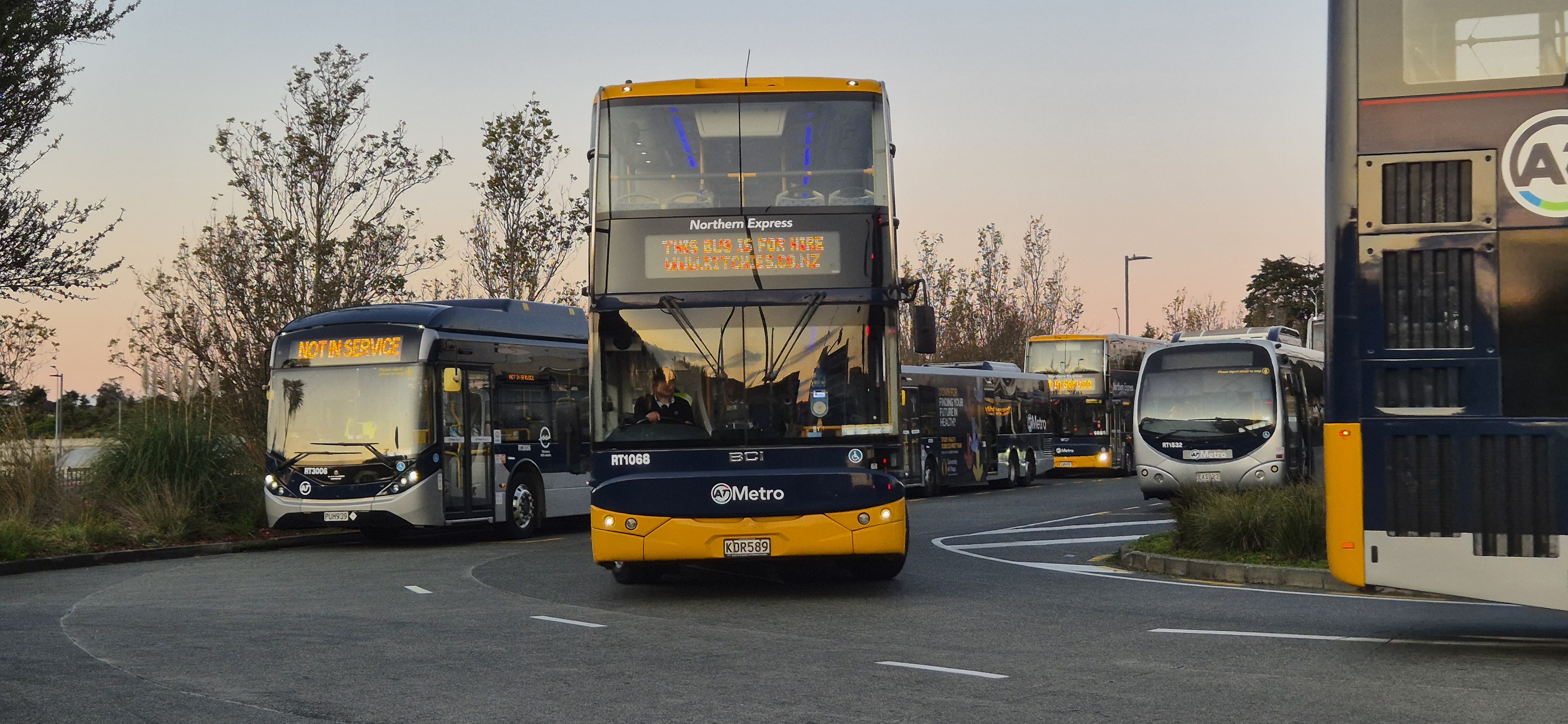
RT1068 on NX1 at Albany Station. It is noted that it has a newer face with the same design setup as RT1050-1065, but without the seat opposite the driver.

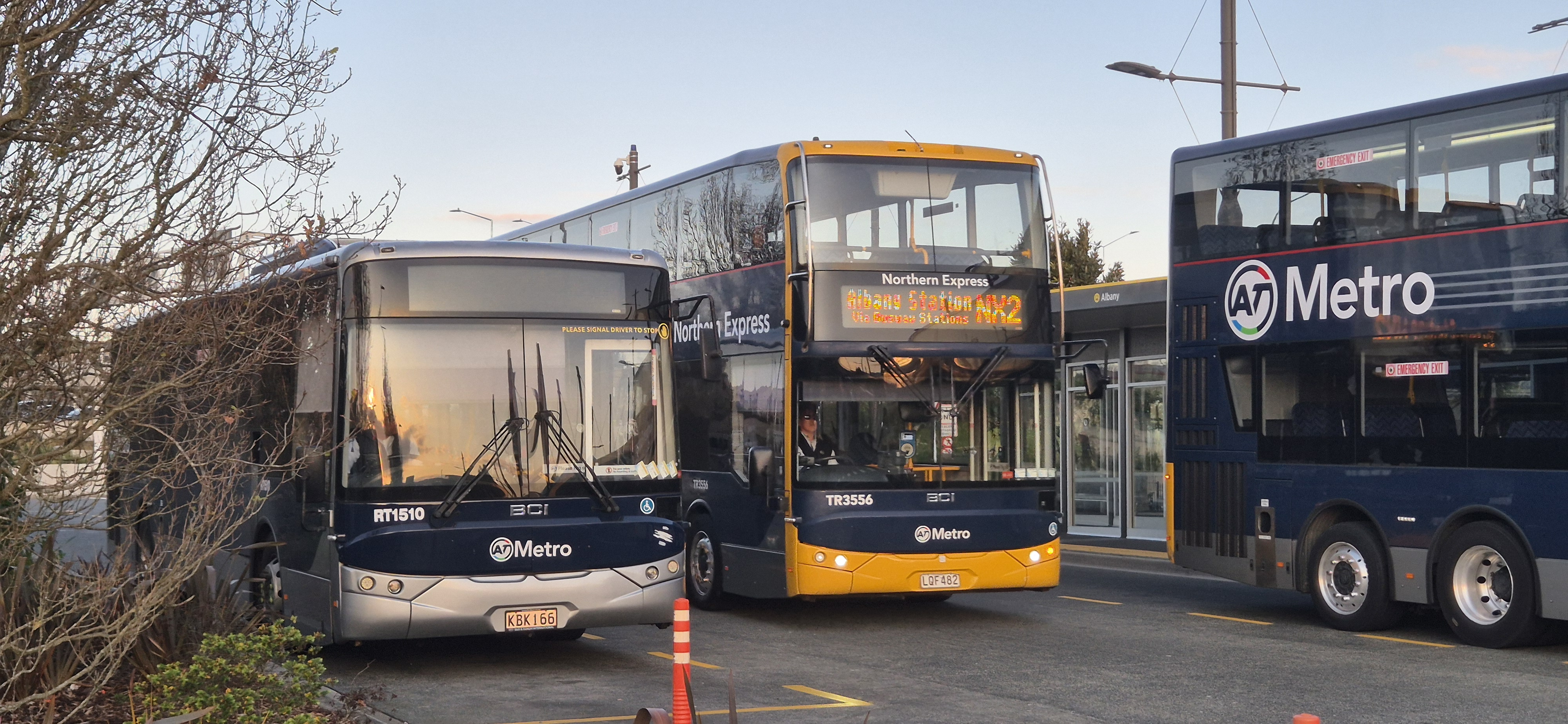
RT1510 (on break) & TR3556 on NX2 at Albany Station. TR3556 has a refreshed interior with McConnell seats & plug double rear doors. RT1510 has McConnell seating with a double-leaf front door and a single-leaf rear door.

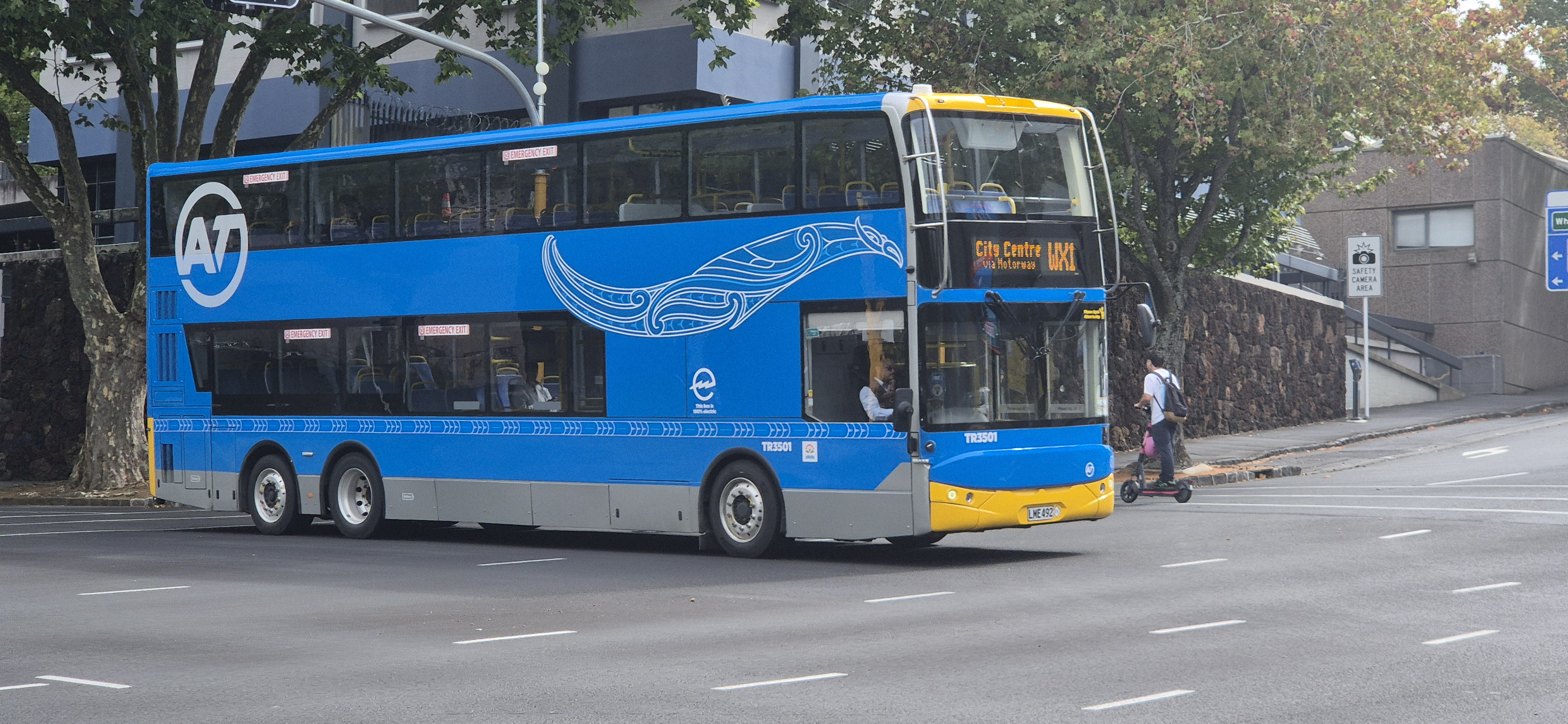
TR3501 on WX1 spotted crossing in Mayoral Street. TR3501 is the power converted BCI Citirider DD that started in the Wellington fleet.

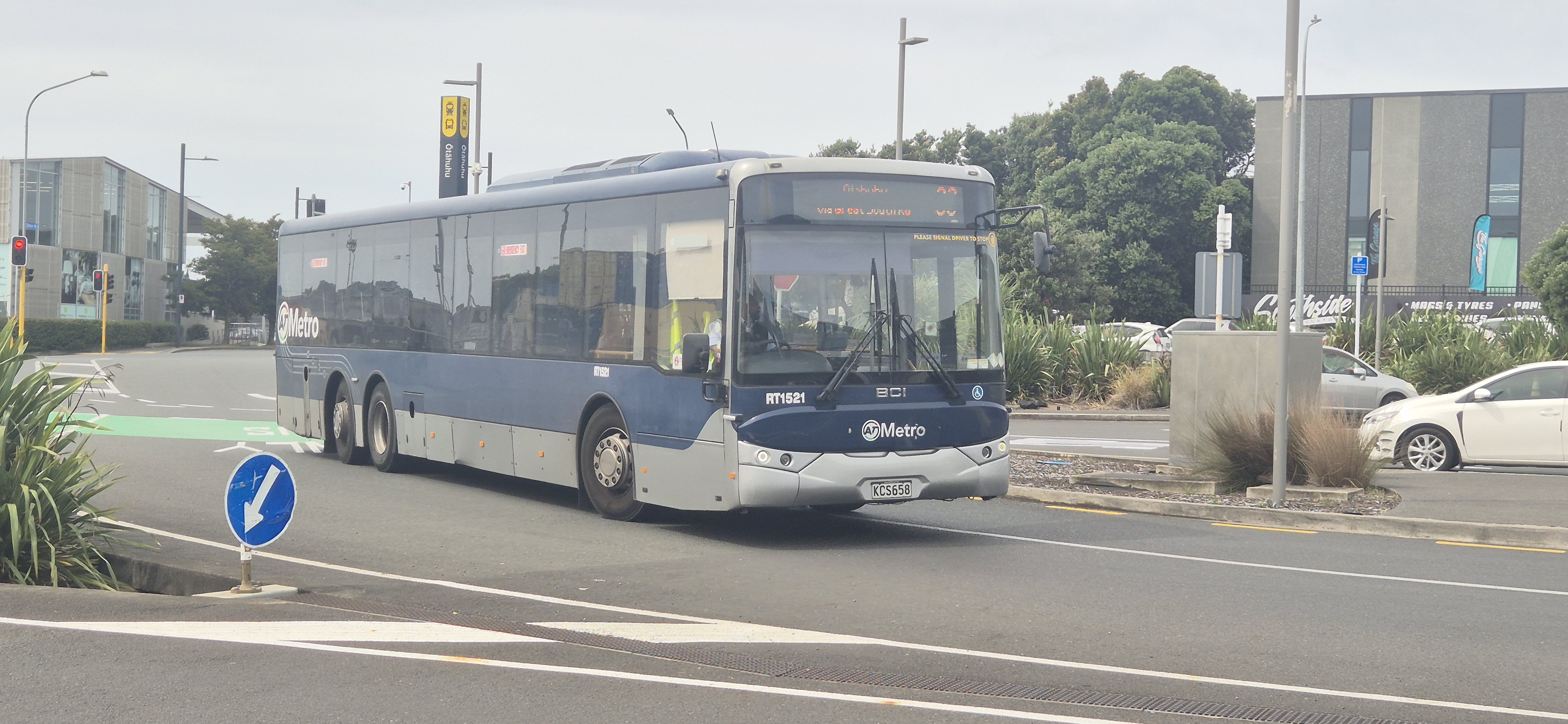
RT1521 arrives at Ōtāhuhu Interchange on 33. Notably, these are Scania K320's with BCI FBC6123 SD bodies. They feature double-leaf front doors, single-leaf rear doors and McConnell seats.

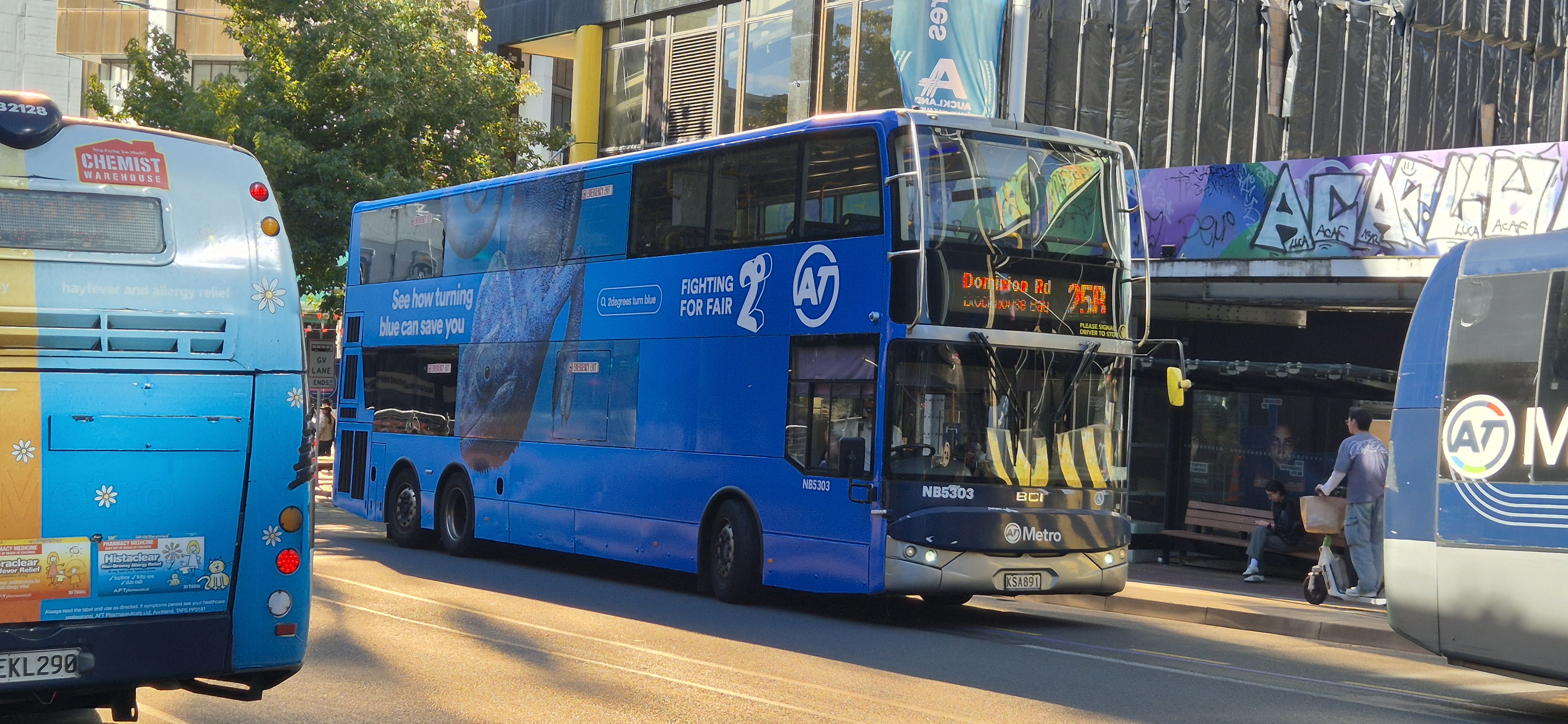
NB5303 at Aotea Square/The Civic Theatre with a 25B. Same features as TR3550-68.

=== United Kingdom ===
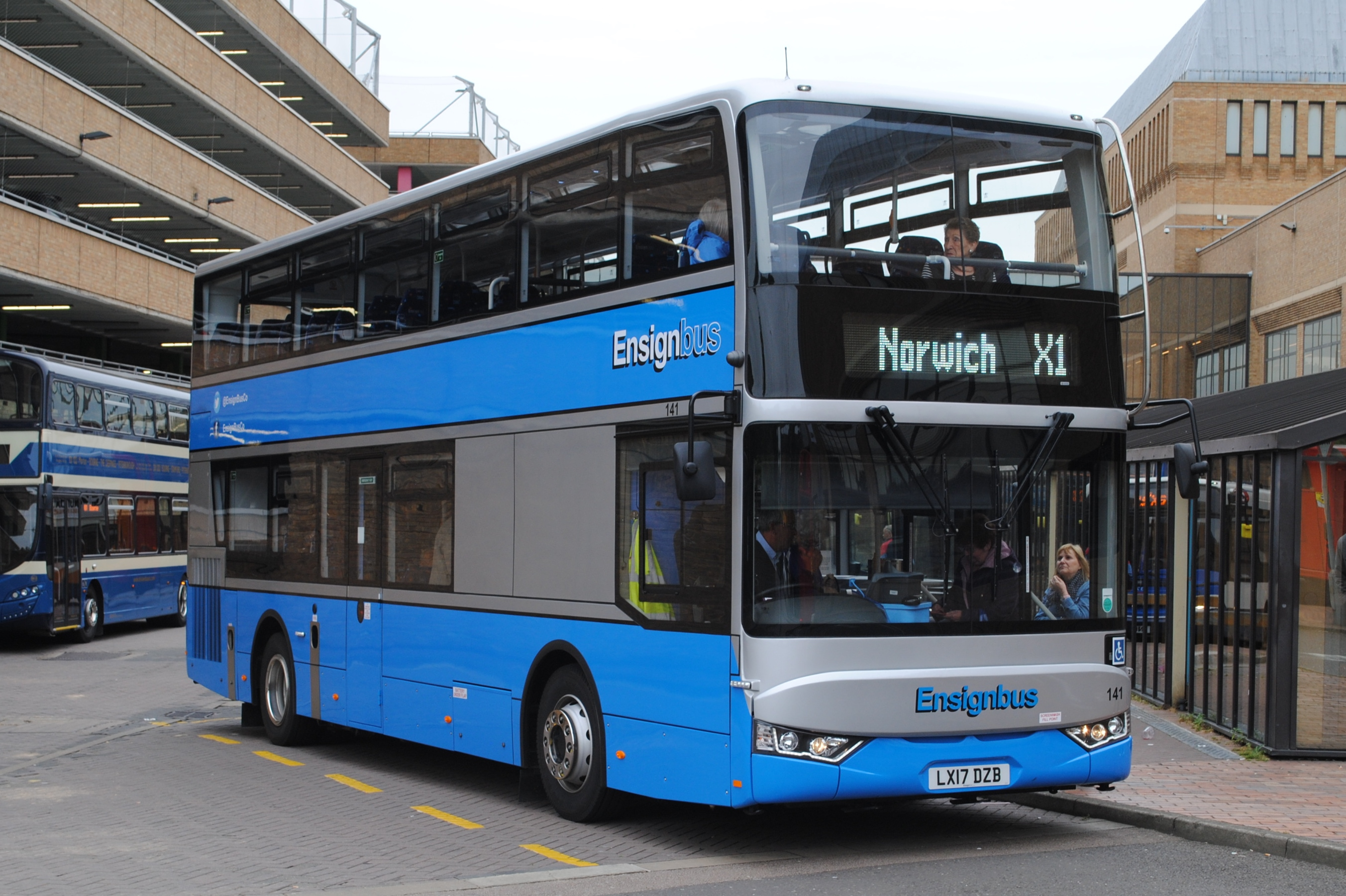
Ensignbus twin-axle BCI Excellence in Peterborough bus station in July 2017

Importers Ensignbus were the first operator of the BCI Enterprise in the United Kingdom, taking delivery of four examples in August 2016. Aintree Coachline additionally took delivery of the fifth Enterprise. Ensignbus later took delivery of ten twin-axle Excellences in 2016.

A BCI Enterprise built to Transport for London specification with a Vantage Power hybrid drive was trialled by Go-Ahead London on route 12 during 2018. Operating as a spare vehicle from River Road garage in East London, the interior of the BCI Enterprise 2HD had a 130-passenger carrying capacity, air conditioning as standard and additionally featured USB chargers and mobile phone holders in the backs of every high-backed seat.

=== Other markets ===
Four BCI Citirider double-deckers, alongside one MAN double-decker, were delivered to PT Transportasi Jakarta for use on Transjakarta sightseeing services in July 2015.
