= Ensignbus =

Bus and coach operator and dealer in Purfleet, England

Coordinates: 51.49399°N 0.2317°E

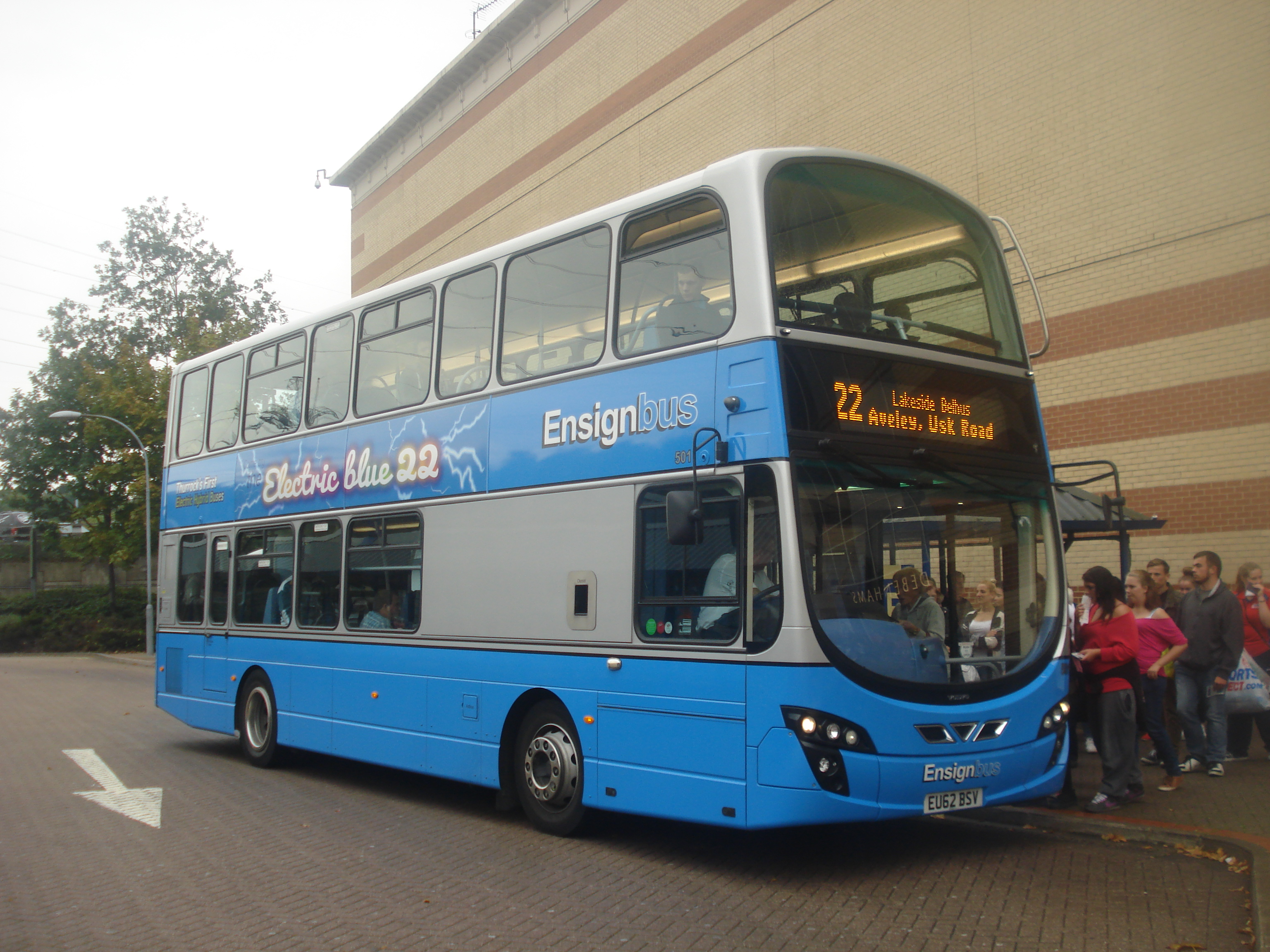
- Ensignbus Wright Eclipse Gemini 2 bodied Volvo B5LH at Lakeside Shopping Centre in September 2013
- Parent: FirstGroup
- Founded: 1972; 54 years ago
- Headquarters: Purfleet
- Service area: Essex; Kent; East London
- Service type: Bus services Bus dealer
- Routes: 9 (October 2025)
- Hubs: Grays station Lakeside Shopping Centre
- Depots: https://www.ensignbus.com/bus-routes.html
- Fleet: 55 (February 2023)
- Website: www.ensignbus.com

Ensign Bus Company Limited, trading as Ensignbus, is a bus and coach operator and bus dealer based in Purfleet, Essex. As of March 2023, it is a part of FirstGroup.

== History ==
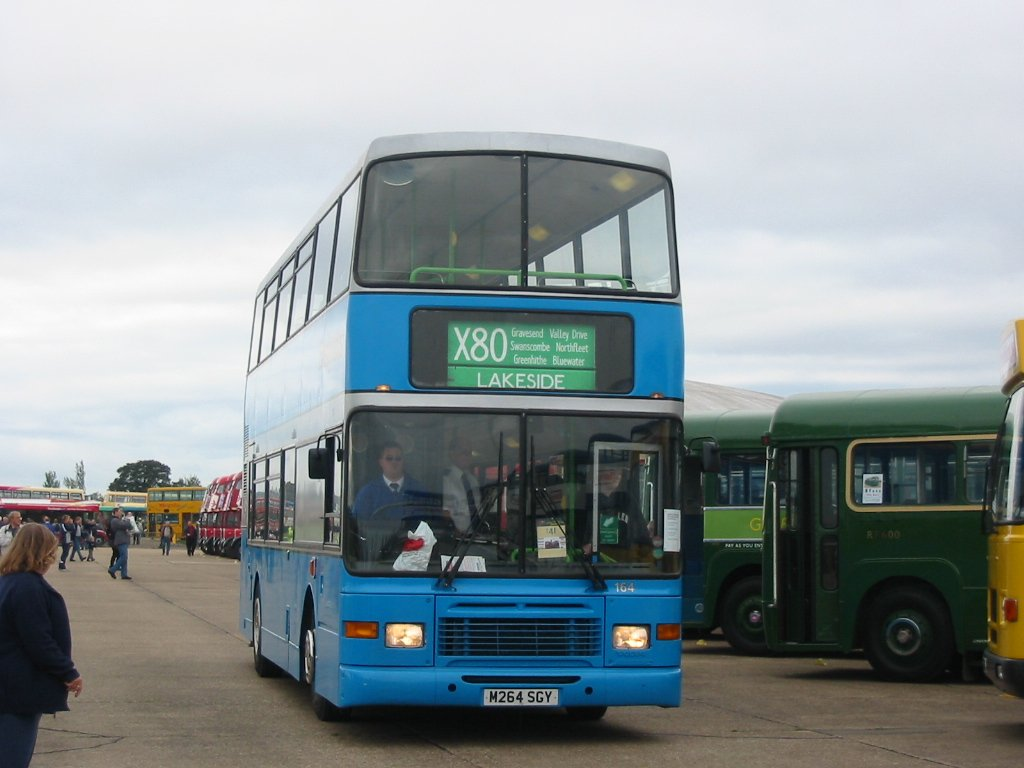
Alexander Royale bodied Volvo Olympian in 2004

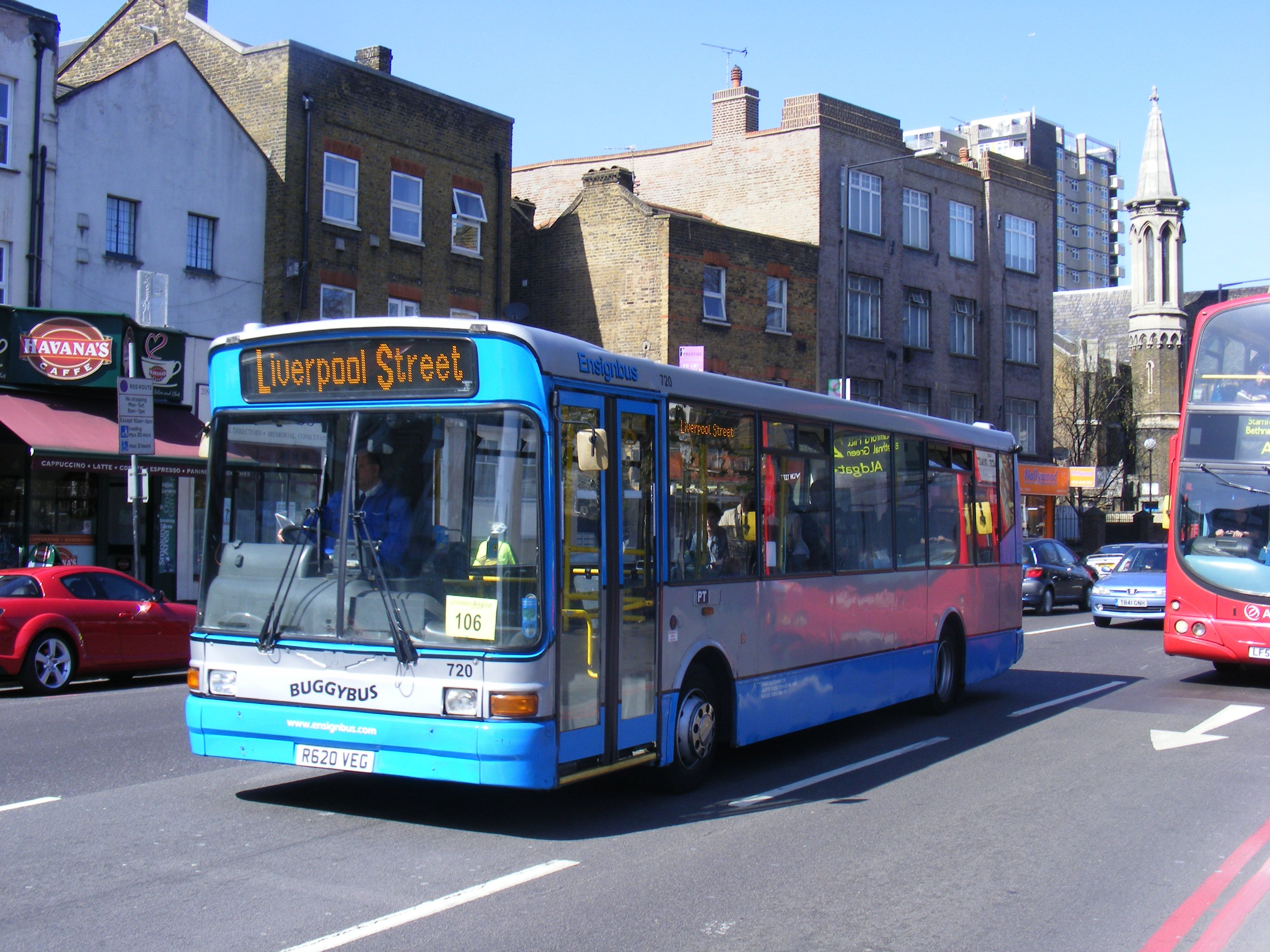
Marshall Capital bodied Dennis Dart SLF on Rail replacement in April 2012

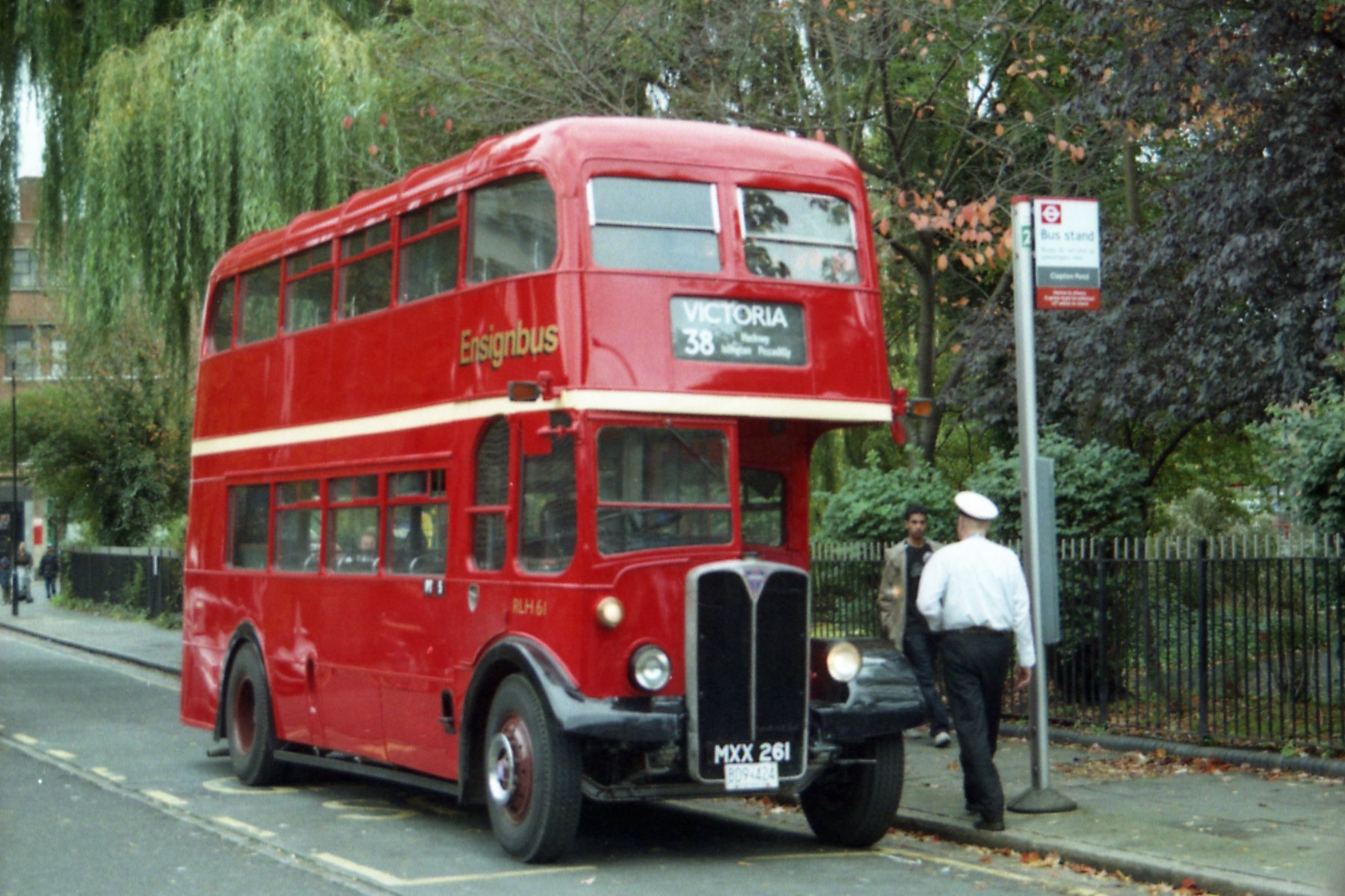
Weymann bodied AEC Regent III at Clapton Pond in October 2005

Ensignbus was formed in 1972 by Peter Newman, who remains involved today as chairman and his sons Ross and Steve as directors. Ensignbus commenced with a small number of bus contracts for the Port of London Authority and Lesney Products and later diversified into bus sales and operating open top bus tours.

It was announced on 8 February 2023 that with the retirement of its owner Peter Newman and his sons Ross and Steve, Ensignbus was to be purchased by FirstGroup, with its bus dealer business and bus service operations remaining separate from the operations of First Essex. The company's heritage fleet operation was not included the sale and remains with the Newman family. The last day of independent operations was on 9 March 2023.

== Bus sales ==
The company came to prominence in the UK when London Transport decided to dispose of its unpopular and poor performing Daimler Fleetlines from 1979. Ensignbus was the only company willing to bid for all these buses as one batch, numbering over 2,000 buses, as preferred by London Transport.

As the vehicles arrived, Ensignbus moved to larger premises in Purfleet. While some were scrapped, Ensign sold many of these buses to operators around the country and abroad, with many ex-municipal companies and new operators requiring cheap reinforcements for enhanced competition following the deregulation of bus services in 1986. Over 400 were sold to China Motor Bus in Hong Kong.

During the London Pride Sightseeing operation, Ensignbus continued selling buses in smaller numbers from a site in Rainham. With the sale of London Pride, Ensignbus moved to another site in Purfleet, and grew its sales business.

Ensignbus was involved in the sale of London's AEC Routemaster buses following their withdrawal from regular use. As of 2013, it was the largest used bus dealer in the UK.

== Open top tour operations ==
In October 1985, Ensignbus purchased the London Pride Sightseeing open top bus tour business. Through links gained by selling open top buses to other operators around the world, Ensignbus expanded the concept to other cities setting up new tours. In January 1998, the open-top tour business was sold.

Starting in 1998 with an operation in Seville, in 1999, Ensignbus launched the City Sightseeing global sightseeing bus brand with a worldwide franchise model, and proceeded to rapidly expand into several cities. In May 2002 City Sightseeing bought out its main rival Guide Friday.

In November 2000, Ensignbus reacquired the London Pride Sightseeing business but sold it in 2001 to The Original Tour. In June 2004, Ensignbus purchased Bath Bus Company and transferred its City Sightseeing operations in Cardiff, Eastbourne, and Windsor to the company.

In February 2011, the Bath Bus Company business was sold to the RATP Group. In April 2011, Ensignbus sold City Sightseeing to Enrique Ybarra.

== London tendered services ==
As a result of deregulation in the mid-1980s Ensignbus expanded into tendered London Buses work in East London. Starting with one or two routes, Ensignbus gained a network of routes, using several second hand vehicles and batches of new vehicles:

- 8 1989-built Alexander bodied Leyland Olympian double-deckers
- 5 1989-built Northern Counties bodied Leyland Olympian double-deckers
- 16 1988-built MCW Metrobus double-deckers

In July 1989, it purchased the business of Frontrunner South East from Stagecoach East Midlands with route 248 and 252. In December 1990, Ensignbus sold its London tendered bus services to Hong Kong company Citybus with the Dagenham depot and 87 buses. It was rebranded as Ensign Citybus and then Capital Citybus.

Ensignbus briefly re-entered London tendered services on 7 February 1999, taking over route 324 (Hornchurch-Lakeside) and school service 648 (Romford-Thurrock College) from First Capital who had bought Capital Citybus on 8 July 1998, even later creating a night variant of route 324 numbered N324, which only lasted five nights, when the route was extended to Bluewater from Lakeside and Romford Market from Hornchurch on 16 March 1999. Ensignbus also created a school variant of the 324 numbered 623 between Hornchurch and Belhus on the same day that route 324 was taken over, however the service did not last long as it was withdrawn by 22 July 1999. Ensignbus later took over London tendered service route 348 (Romford-Lakeside) on 12 June 1999 from Eastern National after the route was re-introduced after being withdrawn and replaced by an extension of Eastern National route 351 to Lakeside, and Ensignbus extended route 348 to Gravesend via Bluewater, although this only lasted until 11 December 1999, when the route was withdrawn back to Lakeside. Routes 325 and 509 were later added before Ensignbus once again sold its London services on 11 December 1999, this time to Town & Country Buses.

== Essex and Kent services ==
In 2004, Ensignbus commenced operating a 12-month rail replacement contract in Kent for South Eastern Trains while the Higham and Strood tunnels were closed to strengthening. To avoid being charged the £2 crossing fee for each empty bus on the Dartford Crossing, as well as making use of the dead running from its Purfleet depot, a bus route was introduced between Chafford Hundred and Gravesend via Lakeside and Bluewater Shopping Centres, being numbered as X80. Despite its infrequent timetable, the X80 proved successful and was kept going after the rail contract finished, albeit being cut back to run between Lakeside and Bluewater only.

In 2006, Ensignbus commenced operating services under contract to Thurrock Council and began operating services in Thurrock in competition with Arriva Southend. As at October 2016, it operated 16 routes. In April 2017, Ensign took over two further routes in Thurrock from Amber Coaches.

Ensignbus had combined all their separate routes X21, X31 and X81 running between Ongar, Shenfield and Lakeside Shopping Centre into one route numbered the X90 on 18 February 2019, between Brentwood and Lakeside Shopping Centre via Warley, Great Warley, North Ockendon, South Ockendon and Stifford. However, route X90 did not last long as the service was withdrawn on 15 June 2019, due to an unviable amount of passengers as at the time the Elizabeth line was not fully open, with the intended replacement being the already existing commercial 269 service operated by NIBS between Brentwood and Grays.

In June 2019, Jetlink X1, a night bus service between London Southend Airport and London Victoria via Lakeside Shopping Centre, Canning Town, and Embankment stations commenced. It was withdrawn after a few weeks due to Ensignbus being denied access to Southend Airport. It recommenced on 5 October 2019 but was withdrawn again in March 2020 due to the COVID-19 Pandemic.

On 17 June 2019, Ensignbus' services in Brentwood were taken over by NIBS Buses.

== Today ==
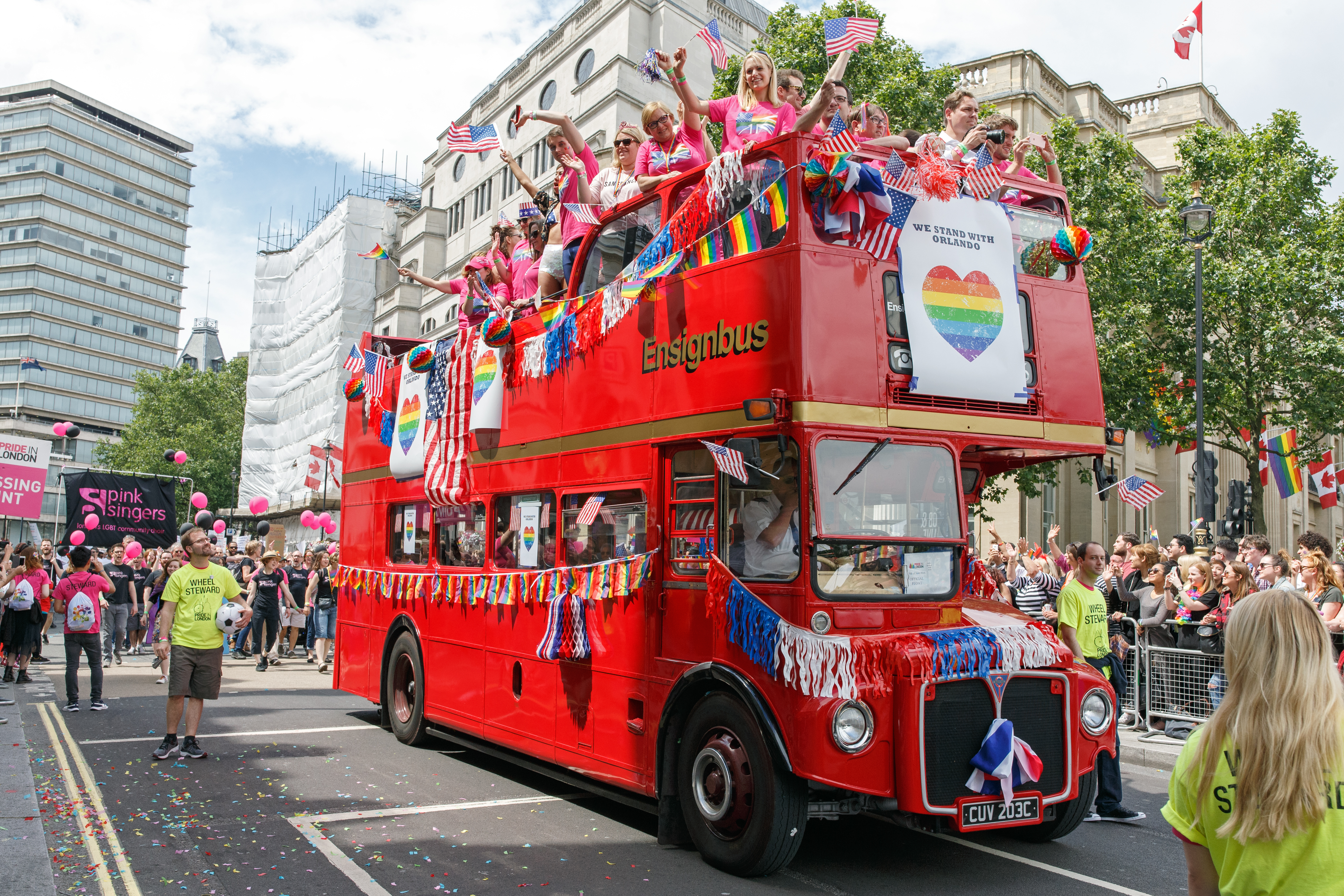
AEC Routemaster in the Pride London Parade 2016

Today, Ensignbus retains a small bus service network centred on Grays station and Lakeside Shopping Centre. It also regularly provides buses for rail replacement services to train operators including Abellio Greater Anglia, c2c, Southeastern, and Transport for London.

Ensignbus also operates a dealership selling used buses from several major UK and Irish operators. In 2016, it became a dealer for BCI products, starting with the BCI Enterprise high capacity integral double-decker. The company acts as a partner to Vantage Power, a firm developing technology to retrofit existing buses with diesel-electric hybrid engines.

Ensignbus maintained a fleet of heritage buses with AEC Regent III, AEC Routemaster, Daimler Fleetline, Leyland Titan, MCW Metrobus, and Scania Metropolitans represented. As well as being available for charter, Ensignbus operated these at an annual running day on the first Saturday in December each year. On 31 August 2024, Ensignbus running day was discontinued because routes X21, X54, X55 and X81 were permanently retired, with the classic buses relocated to Peter Newman's retirement project, the Zero2 Bus Museum located at Great Yeldham.

== Fleet ==
As of February 2023, Ensignbus operates 55 single and double deck buses, which are a combination of new and second-hand purchases. Fleet livery is light blue and silver. The fleet includes six Volvo B5LH Wright Eclipse Gemini hybrid electric buses delivered in November 2012.

== See also ==
- Capital Citybus
- City Sightseeing
- London Pride Sightseeing
