= BCI Bus =

Bus and coach import company

BCI
- Trade name: BCI
- Founded: 1991
- Founder: Ron Nazzari
- Headquarters: Perth, Western Australia
- Key people: Ron Nazzari (Chairman) Desmond Arsmtrong (CEO)
- Products: bus, coaches, city buses
- Website: www.bcibus.com.au

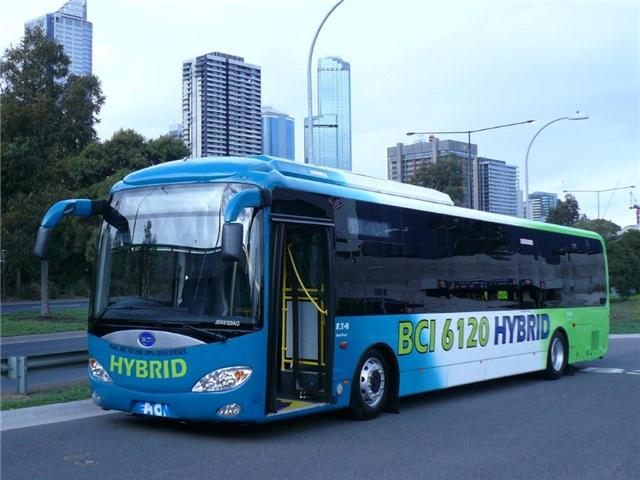
BCI 6120 diesel electric hybrid bus

BCI is a bus and coach importer headquartered in Kewdale, Perth, Western Australia. It was established by former Hino dealer Ron Nazzari in 1991 as a small family-run operation. It initially imported buses from Malaysia, both fully assembled and in knocked down form.

In 2006, it moved production to China. In May 2011, BCI opened the 48,000 square metre Xiamen Feng Tai Bus and Coach International factory in Xiamen, Fujian Province, China. It sells buses in Australia, New Zealand and the United States. Although manufactured in China, vehicles carry Australian Vehicle identification numbers.

In 2016, Ensignbus began to sell BCI products in the United Kingdom for the first time, starting with the BCI Enterprise high capacity integral double-decker.

== Products ==
=== Current ===
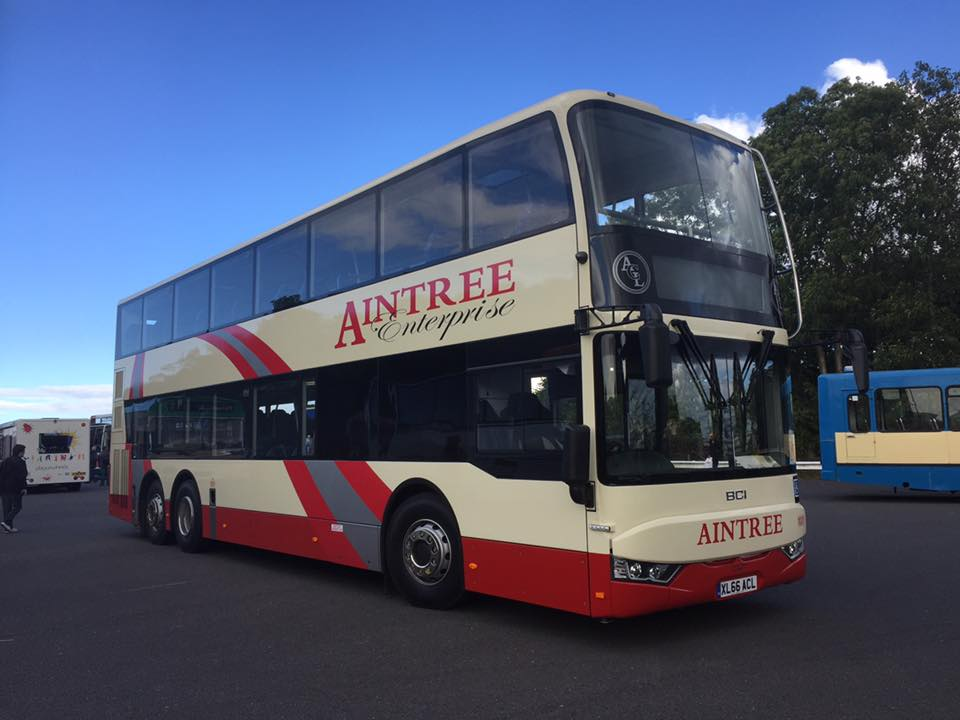
A BCI Enterprise operated by Aintree Coach Lines in the United Kingdom, on display at Showbus 2016

- Airporter
- Citirider 8
- Citirider 12
- Citirider E
- Classmaster 43
- Classmaster 57
- Classmaster 65
- Classmaster 3-axle
- Cruiser 9
- Cruiser 12
- Enterprise
- Excellence
- Explorer
- Fleetmaster 33
- Fleetmaster 43
- Fleetmaster 55
- Fleetmaster 3-axle
- Proma
- Proma DX
- Proma low-floor

Additionally, BCI market the Mercedes-Benz O500R, O500RF and XBC.

=== Former ===
- Hino BD186
- Hino FD1J
- Hino RG197
- Hino RG230
- Hino RK176
- Hino RM260
- MotorCoach Australia 3010 series
- Mitsubishi Fuso MP218
