= Air Enthusiast =

British aviation magazine

- Editor: William Green and Gordon Swanborough (1974–1990); Ken Ellis (1991–2007)
- Categories: Military aircraft Aviation
- Frequency: Bi-monthly
- Founded: 1974
- Final issue Number: Sep-Oct 2007 #131
- Company: Finescroll Ltd. (May 1974–1989); Tri-Service Press (May 1989–1990); Key Publishing Ltd. (May 1991–2007)
- Country: United Kingdom
- Language: English
- Website: www.airenthusiast.com (archive index)
- ISSN: 0143-5450

Air Enthusiast was a British, bi-monthly, aviation magazine, published by the Key Publishing group. Initially begun in 1974 as Air Enthusiast Quarterly, the magazine was conceived as a historical adjunct to Air International magazine. Air International was (and remains) involved with current aviation topics and the Quarterly concerned itself with historical matters.

Each issue contained 80 pages; as a result certain articles were divided and each part appeared over a number of issues. Air Enthusiast was illustrated with colour and black-and-white photos, diagrams, profiles and three-view drawings. Earlier issues featured cutaway drawings, but these were dropped. The articles provided detail for varieties of aircraft and events.

The magazine was published by three publishing companies and changed editors once, with William Green and Gordon Swanborough as joint editors for 16 years and Ken Ellis as the sole editor for the final 16 years.

The magazine ceased publishing with issue #131 (September/October 2007), becoming part of Air International magazine.

== See also ==
- Aeroplane—British magazine covering aviation history and preservation
- Flight International—contemporary aviation magazine
- FlyPast—British magazine covering heritage and historic aviation
