= FlyPast =

UK magazine

- FlyPast, July 2014
- Editor: Tom Allett
- Categories: Aviation magazines
- Frequency: Monthly
- Founded: 1981
- Company: Key Publishing
- Country: United Kingdom
- Based in: Lincolnshire
- Language: English
- Website: www.flypast.com
- ISSN: 0262-6950

FlyPast is an aircraft magazine, published monthly, edited by Tom Allett, Steve Beebee and Jamie Ewan.

== History and profile ==
The magazine started as a bi-monthly edition in May/June 1981 and its first editor was the late Mike Twite. It is owned by Key Publishing Ltd of Stamford, Lincolnshire, and the magazine's main former editor until 2010 was Ken Ellis, and Nigel Price after that until January 2016. It sponsors a number of aviation events held in the United Kingdom, such as Cockpit-Fest, held at Newark Air Museum.

Sister publications include AirForces Monthly, Air Enthusiast (no longer published), Airliner World, Airports International, Air International, and Today's Pilot (no longer published by Key Publishing).

== Contents ==
Each monthly issue of the magazine contains 10 to 12 pages of news, updates and reviews on museums, airshows and events, features on aircraft, crewmen, and battles illustrated with photographs, and a spotlight section on one plane, detailing the history, pilots, designers, combat records, and cutaway artwork for the aircraft. The magazine often includes aircraft posters, calendars, and supplements.

== See also ==
- Aeroplane - British magazine covering aviation history and preservation
- Air Enthusiast - defunct magazine, similar in nature to The Aviation Historian
- Flight International - contemporary aviation magazine
- The Aviation Historian - British magazine covering classic aeroplanes and the history of flying
