= Michael Dryhurst =

British-born American film producer (1938–2025)

Michael John Dryhurst
- Born: March 22 1938; Kingsbury, London, U.K.
- Died: September 9 2025; Hot Springs, Arkansas, U.S.
- Occupations: Film producer; Director; Assistant Director; Second Unit Director; Author; Playwright
- Years active: 1955 - 2022
- Spouse: Karen Gordon (married 1993)
- Father: Edward Dryhurst
- Awards: Golden Globe Award for Best Motion Picture – Musical or Comedy (co-recipient)

Michael John Dryhurst (March 22, 1938 – September 9, 2025) was a British-born American film producer, director, assistant director, second unit director, and author known for his work on the films Superman, Excalibur, Never Say Never Again, The Emerald Forest, Hope and Glory, and Hudson Hawk. He was the son of film director and producer Edward Dryhurst, worked on many films by filmmaker John Boorman, and wrote the novel Check the Gate! in 2022. He also wrote two books about buses and trams, and wrote many articles on historic buses. In 1988, he was the co-recipient of the Golden Globe Award for Best Motion Picture – Musical or Comedy for his work as a producer of the film Hope and Glory. He mostly retired from working on films in 1991, and spent his retirement in Ireland and America. He died on September 9, 2025, at the age of 87.

== Background and early life ==
Dryhurst was born on March 22, 1938, in London, England, to Edward Dryhurst (1904 - 1989), a film director and producer, and May Roberts, who had been a screen extra, and had a brother named Christopher who was an assistant film director. He remembered the Blitz bombings of World War II from when he was a young child. He attended British boarding schools for his education. His father worked on many British films from the 1920s through the 50s, and in 1955, at the age of 17, after his father had gotten into too much debt to pay for his school anymore, Michael himself entered the film industry as a clapper loader for the film The Dynamiter, and subsequently worked as clapper-loader on the films Hell Drivers and A Night to Remember, but went uncredited for them. He later likened these experiences to an "on-the-job film school" .

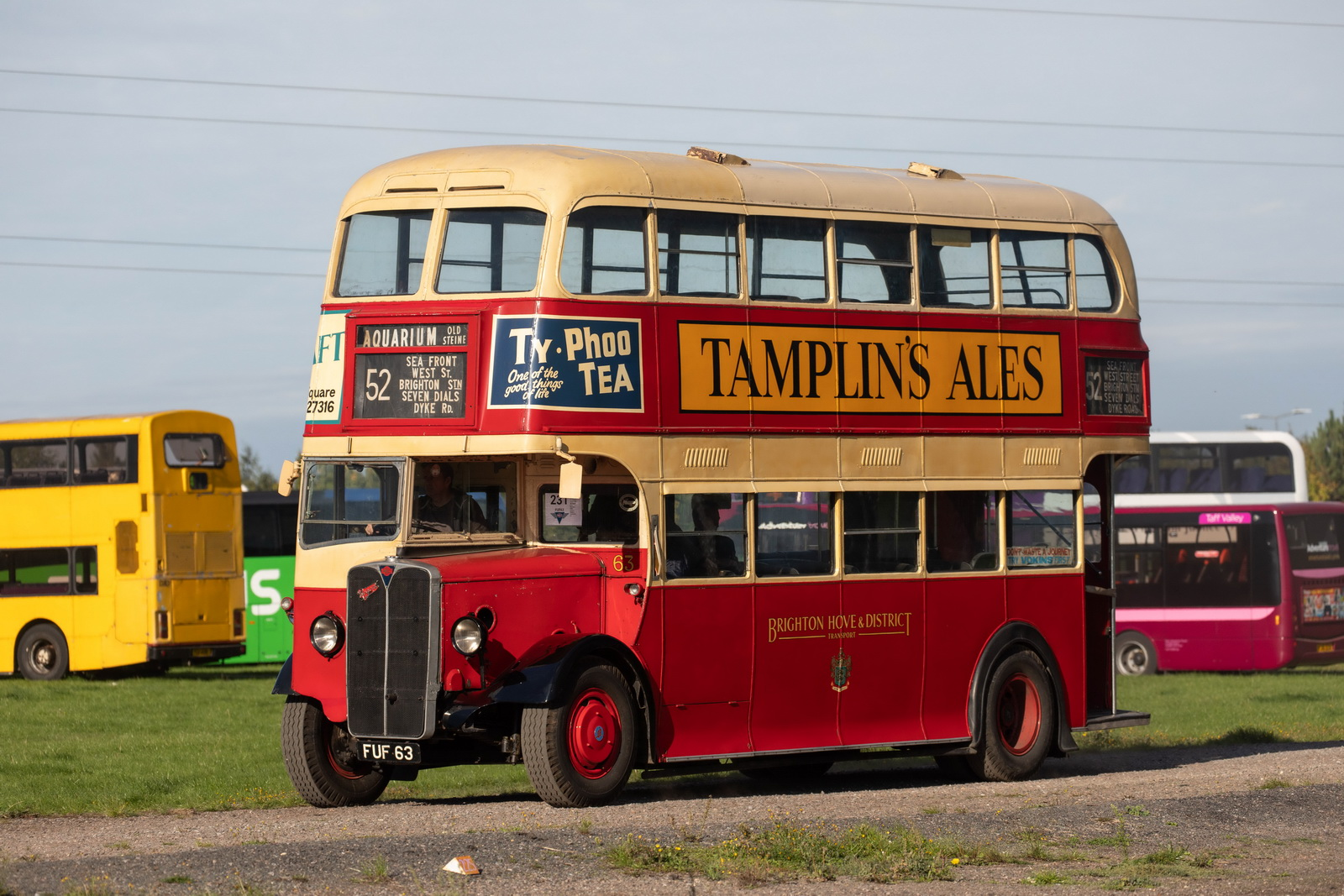
Michael's first preserved bus, Brighton Corporation Weymann bodied AEC Regent I FUF 63, at the Showbus rally in September 2022

From the age of eight, Michael developed an obsession with buses and transportation systems, which he maintained throughout his whole life as a bus enthusiast. Michael was a regular contributor to Buses Illustrated magazine (now named Buses), writing his first letters to the magazine in 1959 to provide corrections for an article about trolleybuses in Brighton, where the Dryhurst family moved to in 1947 and lived in three consecutive homes. At the age of 21, Michael became the columnist for the magazine's 'Look in on London' column under the pen name VH Darling, Michael's girlfriend at the time. Michael adopted the pen name as a compromise to Buses Illustrated publisher Ian Allan, who held a monopoly in publishing transport enthusiast books through Ian Allan Publishing, vetoing his appointment as Allan felt his monopoly was threatened by Michael and friend Ken Blacker's new publishing company, Dryhurst Publications, which was advertising in the magazine.

Michael was an early figure in bus preservation in the United Kingdom, first owning a share of a preserved bus in 1959 before owning a car. In 1965, Michael bought a 1939 Brighton Corporation Weymann bodied AEC Regent I double-decker bus, registered FUF 63 and given Brighton Corporation fleet number 63, for restoration as one of the first double-decker buses bought for preservation by a private individual. Michael kept FUF 63 until he moved to America, where he decided to work primarily in the film industry. Throughout his life, he purchased six other buses from around the world, with his most notable purchase being that of 1939 London Transport AEC Regent III RT prototype RT1 (registered EYK 396), which he had repatriated to the United Kingdom in 1986 for preservation by the London Bus Museum.

== Career ==
=== Assistant director (1964 - 1980) ===
In the 1960s Dryhurst began working as second assistant director on several low-budget British films, and still going uncredited. In 1966 he began working as a first assistant director, and in 1967 worked on the film The Naked Runner, starring Frank Sinatra, which he said was his "breakthrough" and put him in higher demand. All in all between 1966 and 1979 he was the assistant director on 23 films, including several low-budget films, A Midsummer Night's Dream (1968), The Night Digger (1971), All Creatures Great and Small (1975), The Big Sleep (1978), Superman (1978), and The Lady Vanishes (1979). On Superman he also served as the blue screen unit director, meaning he was responsible for directing the scenes in which Superman flies. In 1980, he produced and directed the television film The Hard Way, though was never admitted to a film director's guild. His favorite actor to work with was Ava Gardner.

=== Work as film producer and collaborations with John Boorman (1981 - 1991) ===
In 1981 he began his decade-long professional collaboration with filmmaker John Boorman, when he served as associate producer on the film Excalibur (1981). He subsequently worked with Boorman on the films The Emerald Forest (1985, as co-producer), and Hope and Glory (1987, as co-producer and second unit director). John Boorman described Dryhurst as a trusted colleague, and an accomplished photographer, and admired his ability to remain calm and controlled even when faced with major difficulties during production, such as during the tumultuous making of The Emerald Forest. Dryhurst served as co-producer on the film, and was sent by Boorman to scout locations for the film in the Brazilian rainforest, making surveys of various possible filming locations, during the spring of 1983, and spent a few months there. He selected Belém to be the headquarters of production and in June Boorman came out and reviewed the locations with him, and Dryhurst's then-wife, a makeup artist named Anna, came along. During their scouting trip they were briefly stranded in rural Brazil after missing their plane causing them to have to stay with a man by the name of Senhor Calixto, and they spent a lot of time floating down rivers, though Dryhurst could not swim. Dryhurst also helped Boorman hire people for the film, and was involved in the film throughout all of production.

He then worked on Boorman's personal film Hope and Glory, playing a similar role in production. The film was critically acclaimed and won the Golden Globe for Best Motion Picture – Musical or Comedy the following year, which Dryhurst co-received as he was a producer on the film. He claimed to have used the award as a bookend. He then served as a co-producer of the 1991 film Hudson Hawk starring Bruce Willis, and then effectively retired, only working on a few other films intermittently in subsequent years.

== Later life and death ==
In 1993, he married Karen Gordon, an American film production manager who also worked on the film Hudson Hawk, and served as production accountant on the films Steel Magnolias (1989) and Schindler's List (1993). They lived in Ireland for a while before settling in California. Dryhurst became a US citizen in 1993. He served as producer of the 2006 film Year, and also played a character named Morris in the film, his only film acting role. He also served as a producer on the films Windfall (1998), and Chores (2006), his last film credit. During this time, he also continued regular correspondence to Buses magazine, occasionally having accounts published of long-distance bus trips, and wrote a series of one-act plays.

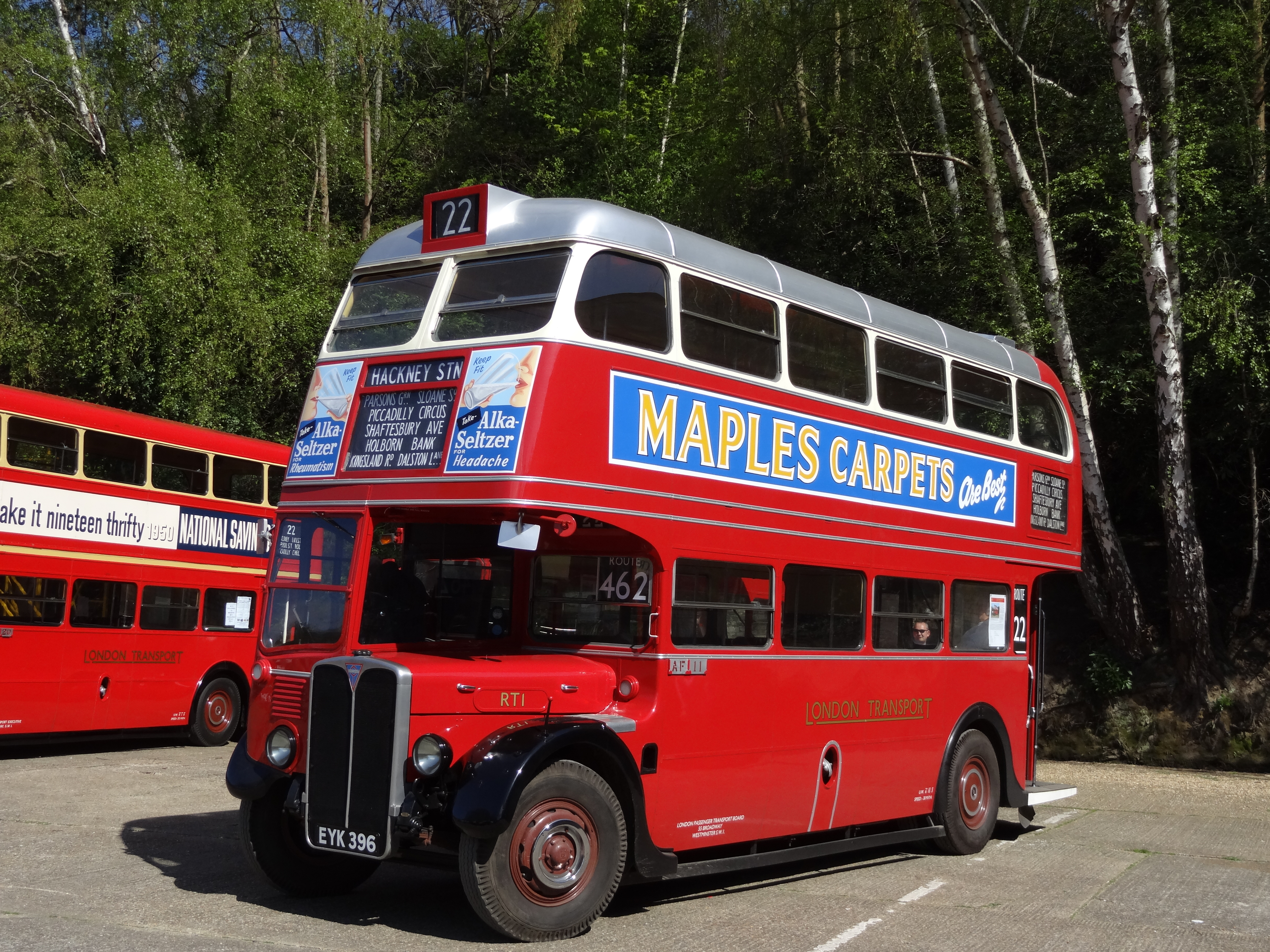
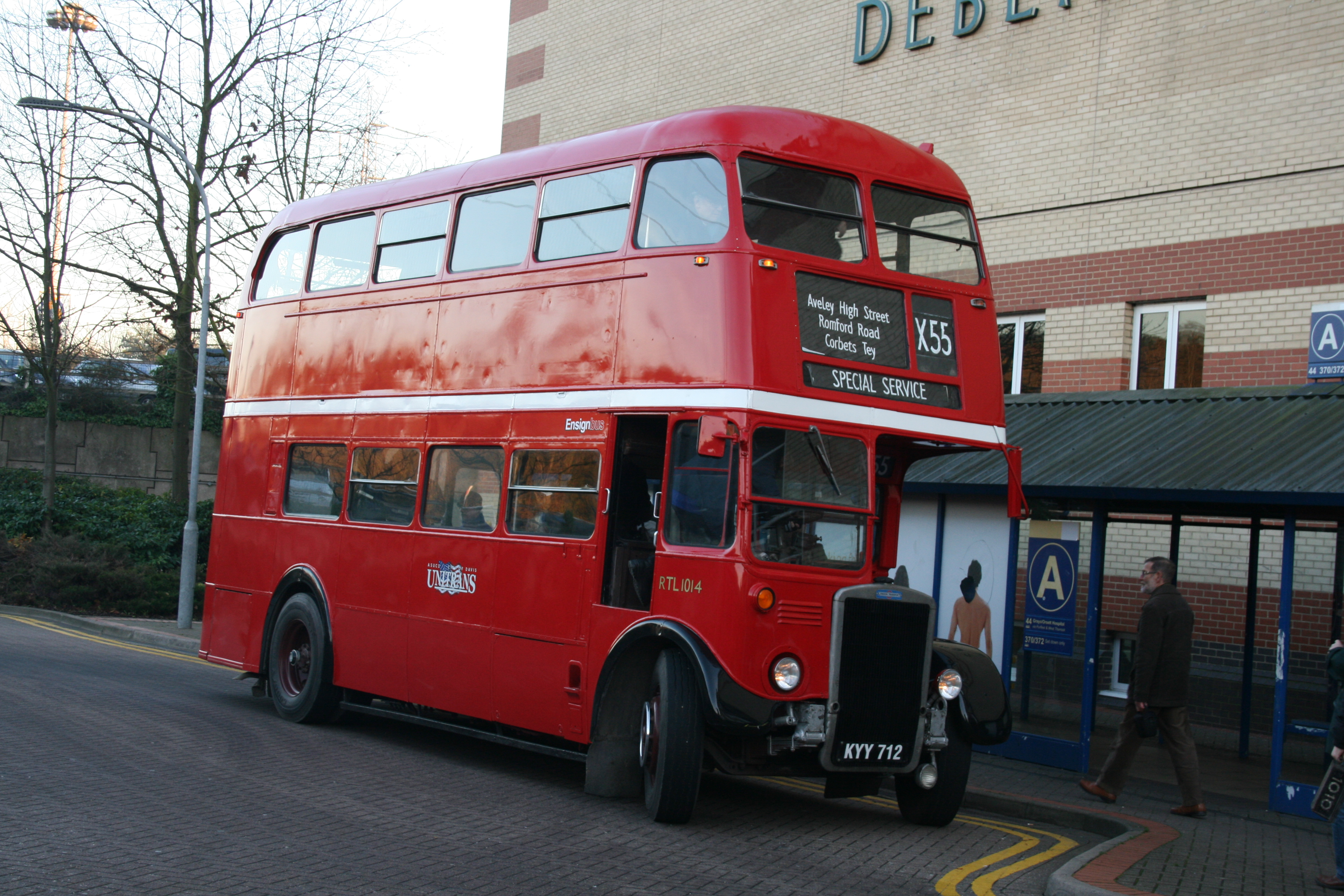
RT1 and RTL1014, the two London buses Michael helped repatriate back to the United Kingdom

In columns for Buses, he made UK-based enthusiasts aware of the existence of former London Transport AEC Regent III RTs and an RTL-type Leyland Titan, numbered RTL1014 and originally registered KYY 712, run by Unitrans at the University of California, Davis. Michael made friends with Liverpudlian expat and Unitrans fleet engineer Wally Mellor, who later gave him right of first refusal of ownership of RTL1014 in 2014 after it was withdrawn from the Unitrans fleet for failing California emission standards; unable to take ownership of it for himself while living in Ireland at the age of 73, Michael instead was responsible for the repatriation of RTL1014 back to the United Kingdom for continued operation and preservation by the Newman family, then the owners of bus dealership and exporter Ensignbus of Purfleet.

Michael and Karen eventually settled in Hot Springs Village, Arkansas. In 2022 he published his first and only novel, Check the Gate! Movie-Making in the Amazon While Dodging Alligators in Hollywood, which is a fictionalized re-telling of his experiences making The Emerald Forest, centering around a film producer making a film in the Amazon who accidentally gets involved with a drug cartel. He also wrote at least two books about the history of London buses and trams. He died on September 9, 2025, in Hot Springs, Arkansas, at the age of 87. His funeral was held in Hot Springs Village at Caruth Village Funeral Home on September 19, 2025.

== Filmography ==
Year	Title	Role
1956	The Dynamiter	Clapper-loader
1957	Hell Drivers	Clapper-loader
1958	A Night to Remember	Clapper-loader
1964	Do You Know This Voice?	2nd Asst. Director
1964	Night Train to Paris	2nd Asst. Director
1964	The Earth Dies Screaming	2nd Asst. Director
1964	Man With Two Faces	2nd Asst. Director
1965	Othello	2nd Asst. Director
1965	Up Jumped A Swagman	2nd Asst. Director
1965	The Murder Game	2nd Asst. Director
1966	The Yellow Hat	Asst. Director
1967	The Naked Runner	Asst. Director
1967	I'll Never Forget Whats'isname	Asst. Director
1968	Up The Junction	Asst. Director
1968	The Long Day's Dying	Asst. Director
1968	A Midsummer Night's Dream	Asst. Director
1969	Hannibal Brooks	Asst. Director
1970	The Games	Asst. Director
1970	The Rise & Rise of Michael Rimmer	Asst. Director
1971	Lawman	Asst. Director
1971	The Night Digger	Asst. Director
1971	The Nightcomers	Asst. Director
1972	Something to Hide	Asst. Director
1972	Pulp	Asst. Director
1972	Baffled (TV Film)	Asst. Director
1973	The House in Nightmare Park	Asst. Director
1973	Scorpio	Asst. Director
1974	The Terminal Man	Assoc. Producer
1975	All Creatures Great and Small	Asst. Director
1977	Exorcist II: Heretic	Special Thanks
1978	The Big Sleep	Asst. Director
1978	Superman	Asst. Director & Blue Screen Unit Director
1979	The Lady Vanishes	Asst. Director
1980	The Hard Way (TV Film)	Director & Producer
1981	Excalibur	Assoc. Producer
1982	Amityville II: The Possession	Production Supervisor
1983	Superman III	Production Supervisor
1983	Never Say Never Again	Assoc. Producer
1985	The Emerald Forest	Co-Producer
1986	Harem (TV Film)	Producer
1987	Hope and Glory	Co-Producer & Second Unit Director
1991	Hudson Hawk	Co-Producer
1996	Moll Flanders	Special Thanks
1998	Windfall	Producer
2006	Year	Producer & Actor
2006	Chores	Supervising Producer

== Bibliography ==
- Dryhurst, Michael (1979). London Bus and Tram Album: 2nd Series. Worthing: Littlehampton Book Services Ltd. ISBN 0711009856.
- Dryhurst, Michael (1987). Bus Portfolio No 2: London Trolleybuses. DPR Marketing & Sales. ISBN 9780950991047.
- Dryhurst, Michael (2022). Check the Gate! Making Movies in the Amazon While Dodging Alligators in Hollywood. ISBN 9798614816568.
