= Military Machines International =

Military Machines International was a military magazine published monthly in the United Kingdom by the Business of Model Activity Press Ltd and then by Key Publishing Ltd. It existed between 2001 and 2014.

== History and profile ==
Military Machines International was first published in May 2001 (cover dated June 2001). In the same month another magazine Classic Military Vehicle also appeared. This was just after the long-running quarterly Wheels & Tracks ceased publication, thereby leaving a gap in the market. Since the first issue the editor of Military Machines International was Ian Young.

It featured articles and photographs on military vehicles, armoured and soft-skin, both past and present, from all around the world.

In March 2011, the Business of Model Activity Press Limited was acquired by Key Publishing Ltd, who publish the magazine under their name from the May 2011 issue onward. The final issue of Military Machines International came in November 2014, thereafter the magazine merged with Classic Military Vehicle.
