= Air Forces Monthly =

British military aviation magazine

AirForces Monthly
- Editor: Glenn Sands
- Categories: Military aviation
- Frequency: monthly
- Circulation: 16,386 Jan–Dec 2016
- Publisher: Key Publishing Ltd
- Founded: 1988; 38 years ago
- First issue: April 1988; 38 years ago
- Country: United Kingdom
- Based in: Stamford, Lincolnshire
- Language: British English
- Website: Official website
- ISSN: 0955-7091

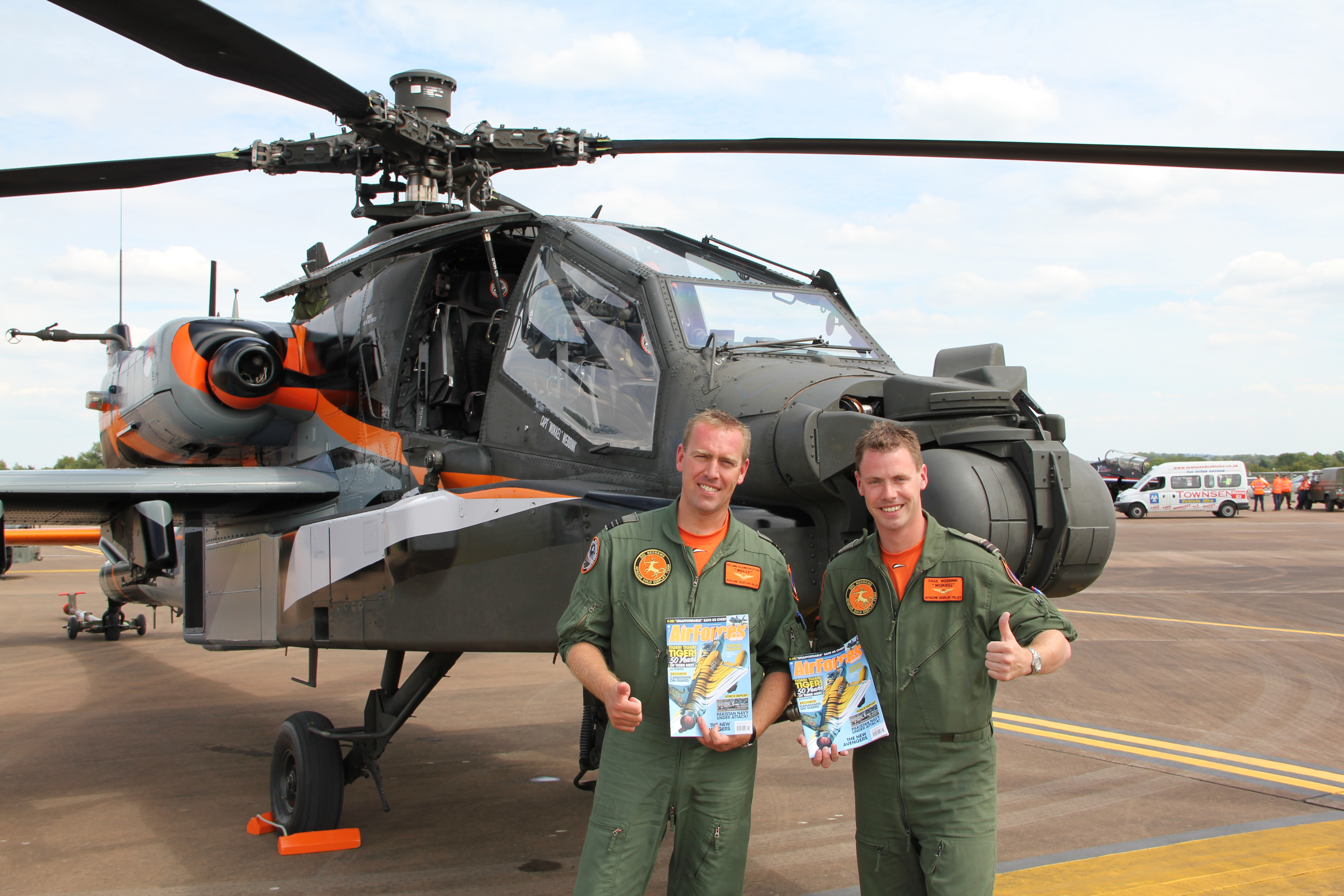
Dutch Air Force AH-64 Solo Display Team pilots with Air Forces Monthly.

Air Forces Monthly (AFM) is a military aviation magazine published by Key Publishing Ltd, based at Stamford in the English county of Lincolnshire in the United Kingdom. Established in 1988, the magazine provides news and analysis on military aviation, technology, and related topics.

The Independent newspaper claims that "Air Forces Monthly is widely read in the MoD and in the defence industry, both in Britain and in the US".

In 1997, an AFM report that a military aircraft crash during takeoff at Boscombe Down on 26 September 1994 involved a classified Aurora aircraft prompted denials from the Ministry of Defence and the United States Defense Department.

Sister publications from Key Publishing include Air International, Air Enthusiast, Airliner World, and FlyPast.
