= Airfix Magazine =

- Airfix Magazine, March 1983
- Categories: Hobby Magazine
- Frequency: Monthly
- First issue: June 1960
- Final issue: October 1993
- Country: United Kingdom
- Language: English
- ISSN: 0002-2705

Airfix Magazine was the first British magazine dedicated to the hobby of plastic modelling. It was launched in 1960 in association with the model kit company Airfix, and ceased publication in 1993. Originally a small-format magazine, it increased in sized eventually to A4 format in January 1976. It covered various scale modelling subjects, including aircraft, railways, ships, vehicles (military and civilian), and military figures. Although carrying the Airfix branding, the magazine was impartial in its editorial content and featured kits from other manufacturers.

== History ==
The first issue was dated June 1960. The title was taken over by PSL Publications Ltd. in 1967. From 1978, it was produced by a succession of small publishers (with some interruptions) until September 1987. The title was subsequently acquired by Alan W. Hall (Publications) Ltd. and publishing resumed with the September 1988 issue. Occasionally reduced to a bi-monthly periodical, publication finally ceased after the October/November 1993 issue.

In 2010, Key Publishing launched Airfix Model World, a magazine very similar in concept to Airfix Magazine.

== Related publications ==
To complement the magazine, Airfix Magazine Annuals were produced for the years 1972 to 1979. In addition, the Airfix Magazine Guide series of A5-size scale modelling guide books on various subjects were also published during the 1970s.
