= William Green (author) =

British aviation and military author (1927–2010)

William Green (1927 – 2 January 2010) was an aviation and military author. During service with the Royal Air Force, he wrote for the Air Training Corps Gazette, later to become Air Pictorial.

Green was technical director to the RAF Flying Review, then editorial director when it became Flying Review International. In 1971 he and Gordon Swanborough jointly created the monthly Air International, of which he remained managing editor until late 1990.

Green edited numerous editions of Observer's Book of Aircraft and spent most of his adult life doing research and writing on aircraft and aviation. His work Warplanes of the Third Reich is seen as a classic aviation publication. Along with Gordon Swanborough, he wrote several books, including The Illustrated Encyclopaedia of the Worlds Commercial Aircraft, Illustrated Anatomy of the World's Fighters, The Complete Book of Fighters and Flying Colours.

He died on 2 January 2010.
