= Bus spotting =

Hobby

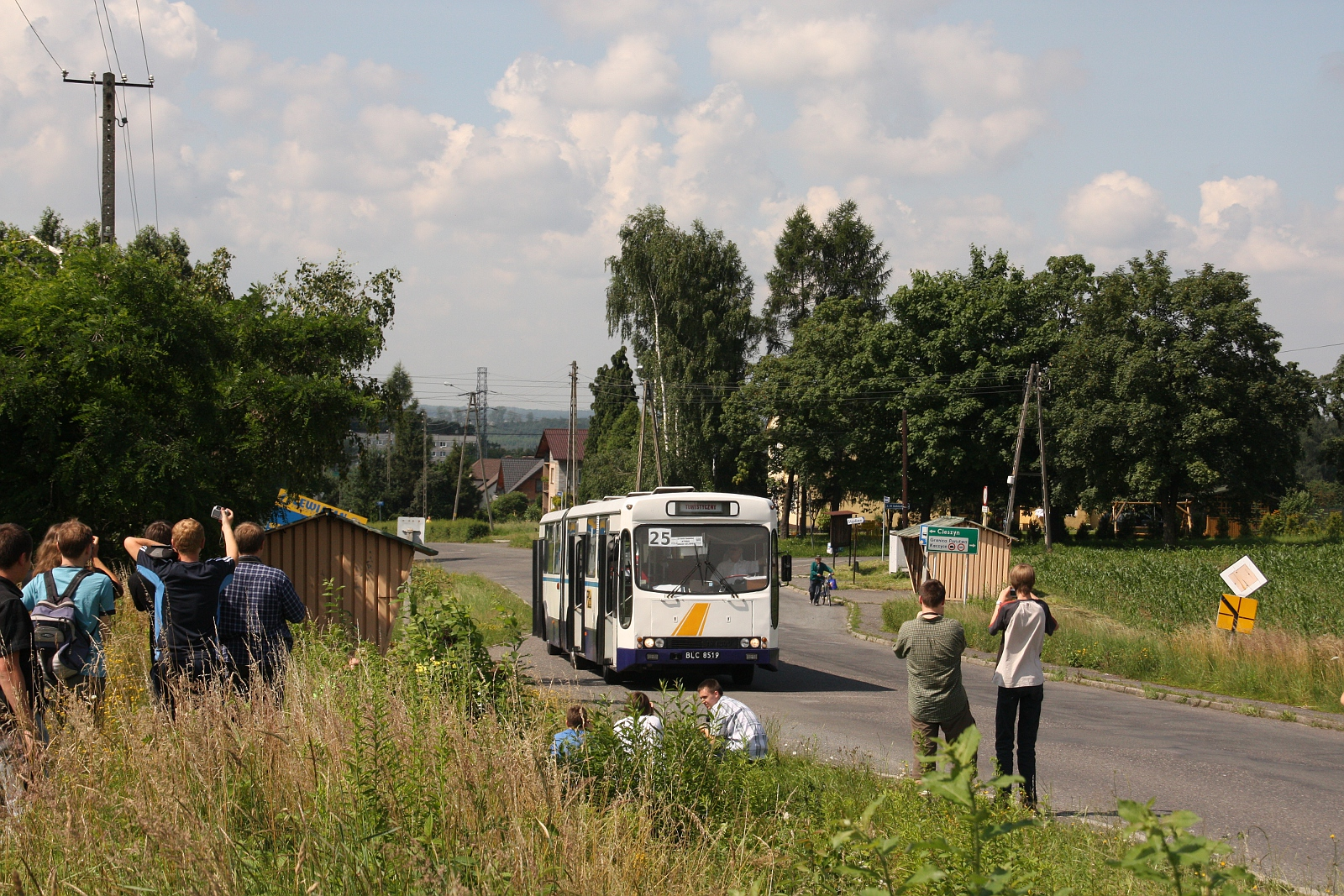
Bus spotters in Poland on a trip celebrating the 25th anniversary of Ikarus-Zemun buses in Cieszyn

Bus spotting, alternatively known as bus fanning, is a technique where people witness buses pass by on the roads. People perform photographing and tracking buses throughout their working service lives within bus companies. A person who engages in these activities is known as a bus spotter, bus fan, or bus enthusiast.

== Basics ==
As a hobby targeting familiar public transportation, many commonalities with railfanning can be seen, and this tendency is particularly strong in the field of route buses. On the other hand, since bus vehicles are a form of automobile and bus enthusiasm is a genre within car enthusiasm, many automotive terms are also seen in the specialized vocabulary. It is a hobby that combines the characteristics of both railway enthusiasm and car enthusiasm, while possessing a unique position that cannot be fully contained within both hobbies either.

Since bus spotting involves urban transit, it often goes hand in hand with railfanning as a part of the broader transit enthusiasm hobby in some countries (particularly North American countries). Such enthusiasts can be known as "transit enthusiasts".

== Activities ==
Bus enthusiasts collect all bus-related information. They are familiar with local bus routes and bus models, and obtain all kinds of dynamics in the bus industry as soon as possible. Like railfans and plane spotters, the activities of bus enthusiasts include observing bus route allocations, sharing bus-related knowledge, and photographing buses.

=== Vehicle Research ===
Enthusiasts investigate and compile information, such as which vehicle types are at which sales offices and how many there are, a list of past vehicles that have been removed from the register, and the types of vehicle configurations, as well as researching unique technologies and specifications for each bus operator.

Additionally, regarding the shared operation of coach buses, there are also bus fans who independently investigate which coach operator is in charge on which day, and personal websites that publish a responsible operator list also exist.

=== Manufacturer Research ===
There are many enthusiasts who have a strong attachment to the products of a specific company and research specific manufacturers and models. Many also prefer specific manufacturers or models due to the influence of the main vehicles used by bus operators in their current residences, and some even travel nationwide to photograph the buses introduced by various operators.

Since the colouring and specifications differ depending on the operator even for the same model, enthusiasts enjoy the characteristics and differences of each operator.

Enthusiasts also follow the whereabouts of vehicles that have been removed from local operators and transferred to rural areas.

Furthermore, in the case of buses, there are coachbuilders who manufacture and mount the bus bodies separately from the chassis manufacturers. Therefore, some enthusiasts love specific bus bodies from coachbuilders and enjoy researching and photographing the bus bodies introduced by various operators.

=== Riding/Chartering trips ===
Enthusiasts typically ride buses as passengers to check the ride comfort. Front-row seats are preferred for a better view of the front and driver's seat, but some prefer the back row for the engine noise, while others check the quietness of the interior.

Enthusiasts may focus on different aspects, such as the interior seat layout and structure, destination indicators, air conditioning, fare boxes, or stop buttons.

In some cases, enthusiasts gather companions to jointly charter a bus for a day trip to enjoy vehicles that are nearing retirement or can only be seen at specific companies or depots.

=== Bus photography ===
This involves taking photos of individual bus types and colourings. It is the railfanning equivalent for bus enthusiasts, but photography is considered more easier compared to trains running on tracks because they don't have to go to specific locations to spot, plus with less barriers as well.

An example of a niche activity is the photography and research of abandoned vehicles. This involves searching for and photographing abandoned vehicles left in empty lots or forests, or repurposed as stores or warehouses, and estimating their original model or operator. Because abandoned vehicles can be found relatively easily compared to railway cars, the hobby of searching for and photographing abandoned vehicles also exists generally within automobile hobbies.

=== Bus driving ===
Some enthusiasts hold a commercial license with a passenger endorsement and drive buses themselves. It is possible to obtain a license as an automobile and drive on public roads, which some bus lookers consider the greatest appeal. Editors of bus magazines who hold large vehicle licenses reports from a driver's perspective, and then published in the magazines.

Rental cars are usually limited to around microbuses to prevent illegal 'white bus' operations, but some rental car shops rent out small charter buses, and some enthusiasts rent and drive these.

=== Riding bus routes ===
This aims to ride all bus routes of a specific operator. The purpose is the same as train rides in the railway hobby, but buses have a more intricate route network compared to railways. There are also routes with significantly fewer services (notably staff routes and depot routes). Not to mention route revisions and abolitions are frequent, so it takes a long time to complete all routes of even one operator.

=== Route research ===
Enthusiasts research which roads bus routes use, for what purpose they are set, which areas they connect, which customer base they target, how they relate to other routes, etc.

Because there is little material on bus routes in some places, some enthusiasts simply enjoy the current situation without delving into past routes or history.

Conversely, there is also the idea of "what if this route had such an operating system?" in a case of deviating from the current situation, which becomes "fictional route research". Enthusiasts also draw routes on a map freely instead of using existing routes or bus operators. Some enthusiasts actually drive the routes as fieldwork, create diagrams, and perform detailed settings such as fare revenue calculations.

Additionally, enthusiasts investigate the history of bus operators, transitions of office changes and abolitions, and abandoned routes. Some enthusiasts consider covering each abandoned stop individually as well. Materials like company histories, municipal histories, and residential maps are fully utilized for the research. This is equivalent to studying historical lines in railway hobbies, but bus route research has extremely few remaining materials compared to railway research, making the difficulty of research high.

=== Bus stop research ===
Equivalent to researching stations and their associated facilities in railway hobbies, this involves researching the form of bus stop signposts, which is associated with its waiting areas and its nearby landmarks. It has diversified in various ways, such as learning about the surrounding environment of the bus stop, taking photos of bus stops with unique names or designs, trying to photograph all bus stop signposts of a specific operator, and even photographing bus stop signposts across the country. In some places, there is also research into large-scale bus terminal facilities.

=== Bus models ===
In some countries, bus models are commercialized as structures, and these are further repainted, or decals are produced and applied to them for modification.

Also, bus models are usually scaled to the size of a toy car and remote control buses are released. Some people enjoy actually running them on the toy roads similar to model railways.

=== Goods collection ===
Enthusiasts collect distributed materials such as route timetables and route maps, bus cards, bus tickets (if they are any), bus-related goods, recording of broadcast audio, etc.

=== Scrap collection ===
In some countries, parts in buses are often sold or auctioned. Enthusiasts purchase scrapped bus products and bus stop display boards sold at bus events. It is said that roll-type destination blinds sell well. Due to the mechanical parts in bus types are getting complicated, some bus operators have increased the number of parts sold by auction.

=== Exchanging Information ===
The results of research on bus operators, vehicles, and routes are sometimes compiled into a single volume and submitted to magazines. These magazines were previously sold on bookstores, but with the subsequent spread of the internet, online sales have also increased.

Furthermore, fan activities utilizing the internet are also popular, such as creating and publishing personal websites and blogs, sharing photographs and recordings on photo-sharing sites and video-posting sites for other enthusiasts to see, and exchanging information on social networking services.

=== Relations with bus operators ===
Some bus enthusiasts who have become familiar with bus companies are even invited to participate in the bus companies' year-end gatherings.

Bus enthusiasts usually also participate in public welfare activities such as voluntary road guidance.

== Preservation of buses ==
Some bus companies sell some buses as decommissioned buses after they have reached a certain operational lifespan. Some bus enthusiasts are nostalgic about these buses and cannot bear to send them to scrapyards for dismantling, so they buy these old buses, restore them, and drive them occasionally as a kind of collective memory for bus enthusiasts. Some individuals even own multiple large buses. However, large vehicles require significant storage space, and while some keep them operational, the costs for parts, maintenance, vehicle inspections, automobile tax, weight tax, automobile insurance, fuel, etc., are enormous, and regulations can be strict for large buses from the perspective of preventing white buses. Because these tasks are often too much for an individual to handle, there are examples of hobby groups sharing buses.

The preserved buses can then be taken out to be driven either on discontinued services or through a set route for an event. Buses owned by such enthusiasts are sometimes exhibited at bus events at the request of the organizers.

== Gallery ==
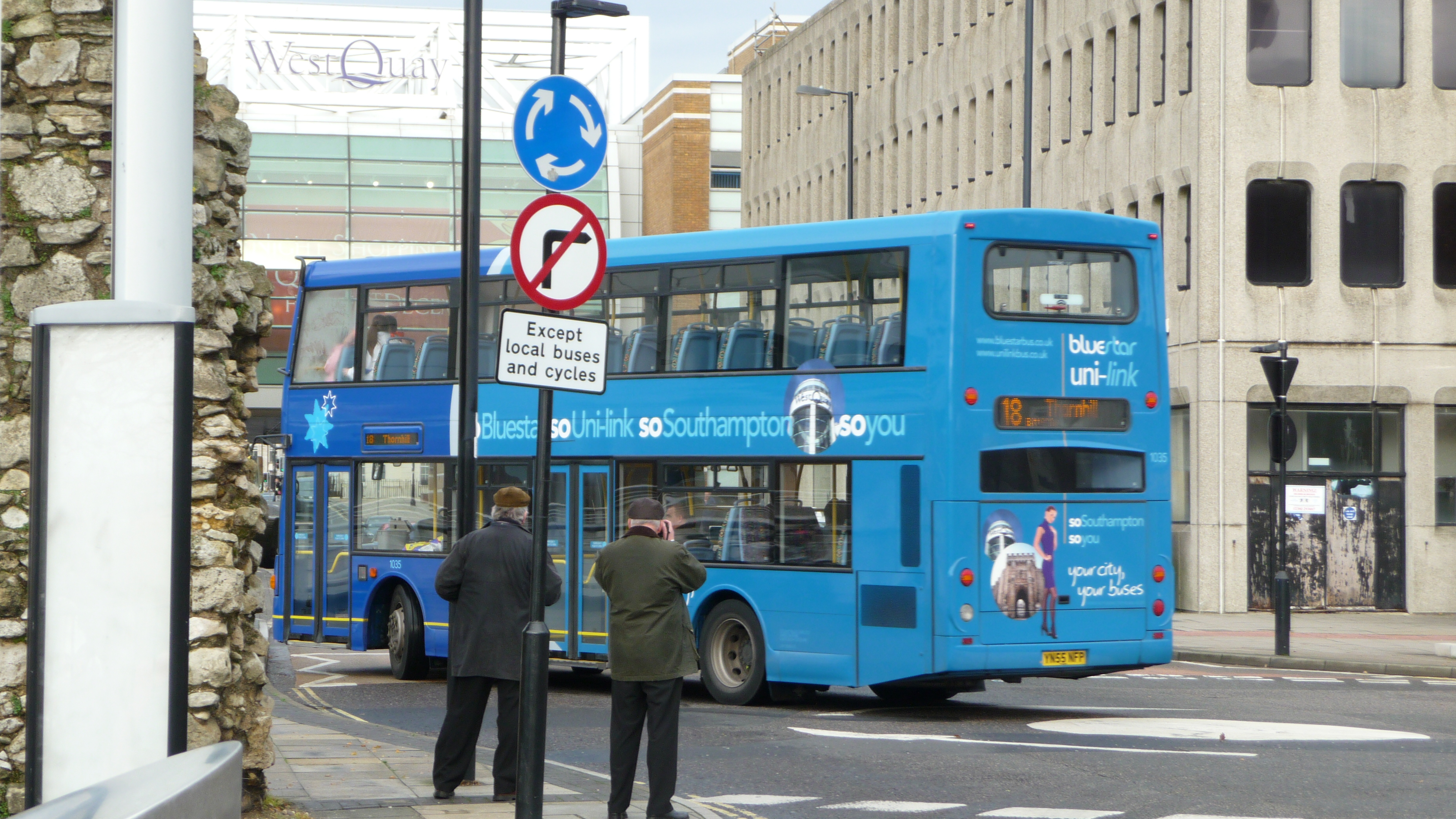
Bus spotters photographing a bus in Southampton, UK

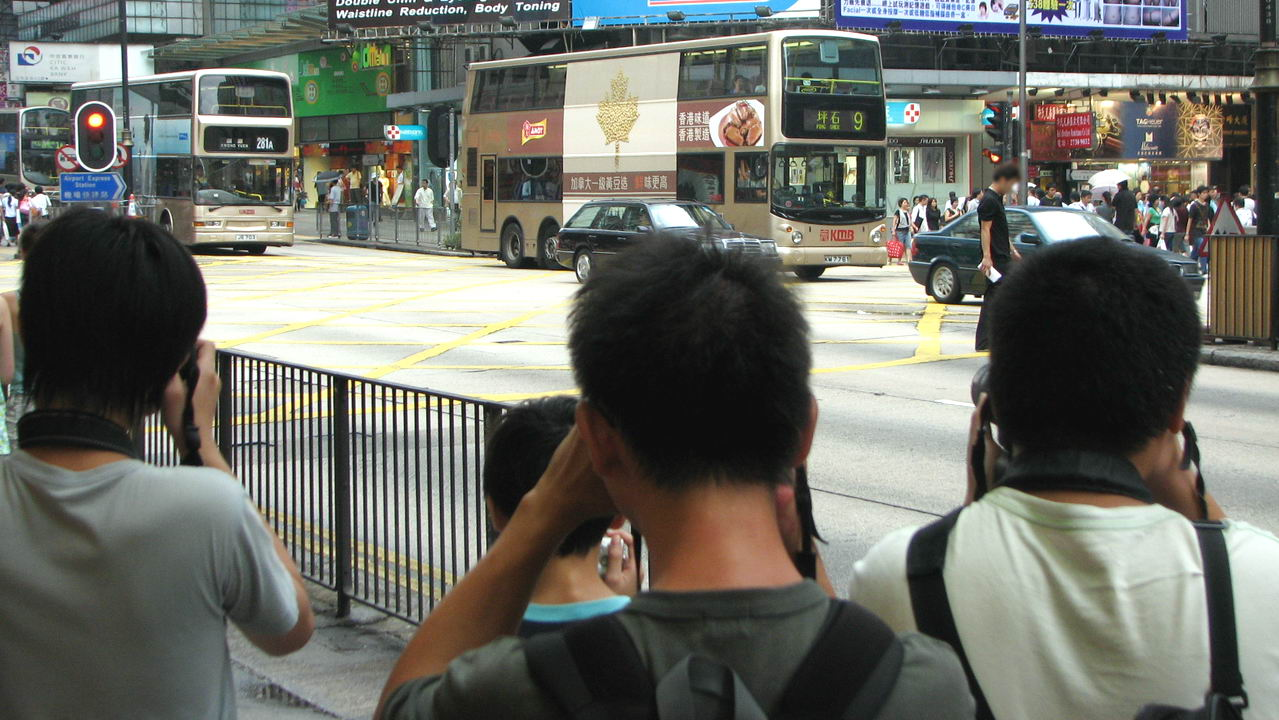
Bus fans in Hong Kong

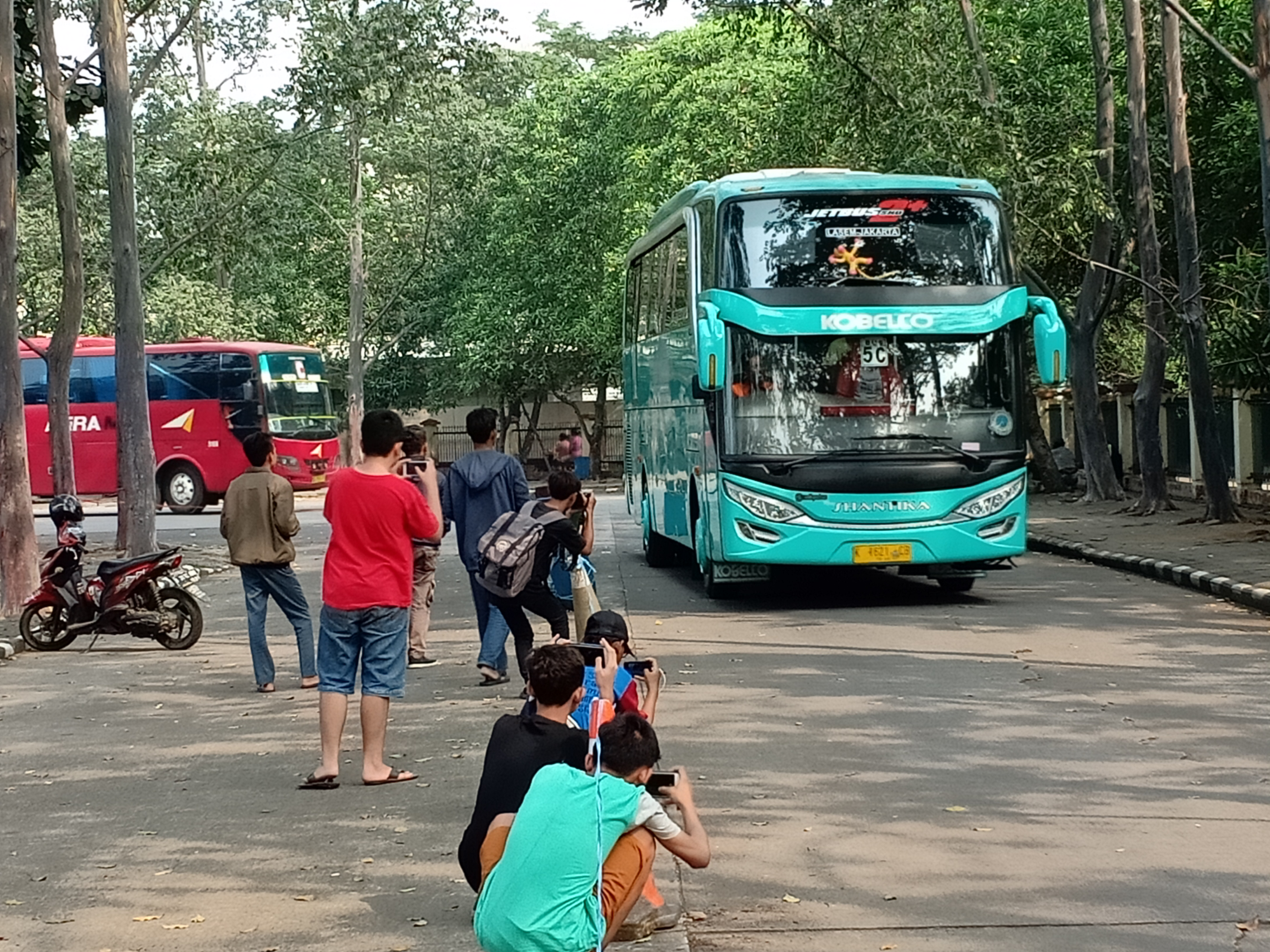
Teenage and adult bus spotters in Indonesia

== See also ==
- Roadgeek
- Railfan
- Plane spotting
- Car club
- Bus preservation in the United Kingdom
