= Aviation News =

- Aviation News, 28 Dec 1984 (Vol. 13 No. 16)
- Categories: Aviation magazines
- Frequency: Monthly
- Founder: Alan W. Hall
- Founded: 1972
- Company: Key Publishing
- Country: United Kingdom
- Based in: Stamford
- Language: English
- Website: www.aviation-news.co.uk

Aviation News is a British aviation magazine covering current military and civil aviation topics. It was first published in 1972 and is currently a monthly publication of Key Publishing Ltd.

In July 1983 (Volume 12 Number 1) it changed to an A4 format magazine with more pages. In 1995 the publishers of Air Pictorial magazine, HPC Publishing, acquired the title. Aviation News was incorporated into Air Pictorial the following year as a monthly magazine; however, the magazine reverted to the Aviation News name in 2002. In 2010, Aviation News was acquired by Key Publishing. Since then, other aviation titles such as Classic Aircraft and Jets have been incorporated into the magazine.
