= Coach & Bus Week =

British transport magazine

Coach & Bus Week (CBW)
- Coach & Bus Week cover, 12 March 2024
- Editor: Jonathan Welch
- Categories: Coach and bus industry
- Frequency: Weekly
- Circulation: ~5,000 (2024)
- Founded: 1978 (as Coachmart); 1992 (as Coach & Bus Week)
- Country: United Kingdom
- Based in: Peterborough, Cambridgeshire
- Language: British English
- Website: cbwmagazine.com/
- ISSN: 1351-3877

Coach & Bus Week (CBW) is a weekly trade magazine based in Peterborough for the road passenger transport industry in the United Kingdom. The magazine is available by subscription, from main branches of WHSmith and from some independent newsagents.

== Profile ==
Regular features of Coach & Bus Week include news columns for both the UK and international bus and coach markets, operator profile, vehicle test drive and technical/product services features. There are sections on fleet deliveries and management changes, as well as a 'Big Picture' photographs section and a 'Last Stop' editorial column for 'interesting' items. The subsections 'Coach & Bus Market' and 'Coach & Bus Jobs' offer listings for vehicle sales and staff recruitment respectively.

Coach & Bus Week is linked with Group Travel World, a monthly magazine for the group travel industry published by GTW Media Limited, which additionally is sent to all full subscribers of CBW.

== History ==
Coach & Bus Week can trace its origins back to 1978 with the founding of Coachmart in Kingston upon Hull by former coach proprietor Terry Beanland. Beanland launched the first issue of Coachmart on 8 November 1978, creating a weekly publication specifically devoted to the coaching industry at a time when operators largely relied on monthly specialist titles or sections of publications focused on commercial vehicles. Coachmart was the first weekly magazine published specifically for the coach industry, who had previously had to rely on monthly magazines or small sections within Commercial Motor or other weekly commercial vehicle magazines. Its most prolific journalist was Ray Pearson, who covered all technical aspects, including road tests and tourism topics. Beanland sold Coachmart in 1986 to Response Publishing (later renamed EMAP Response), moving the magazine to Peterborough and briefly renaming it to Coachmart & Bus Operator. Response Publishing later purchased the Bus Business weekly from Landor Publishing in 1989.

In 1992, following a downturn in advertising revenue as a result of the early 1990s recession, EMAP closed Bus Business and Coachmart. In their place, it launched Coach and Bus Week. The first weekly issue was published on 22 February 1992. The editor-in-chief was Mark Barton, the news and technical editor was Richard Simpson, the features editor was Mike Morgan, and the tourism editor was Mark Williams. The long-term editor of the magazine during this period was Mike Morgan, who left the post in August 2003.

EMAP sold Coach & Bus Week to Rouncy Media Ltd in 2005, however the magazine has been published by Coach and Bus Week Limited since 2012, with Rouncy ceasing trading in June 2012.

Former editors Gareth Evans, James Day and Richard Sharman left the magazine in May 2018, April 2020 and July 2023 respectively. The current editor is Jonathan Welch.

== See also ==
- Buses (magazine)
- Commercial Motor
