= Classic Military Vehicle =

British military magazine

Classic Military Vehicle is a military magazine published monthly in the United Kingdom by Key Publishing. It features articles and photographs of military vehicles, armoured and soft-skin, past and present, from around the world.

The first editor was Pat Ware. In 2007, he handed it over to John Blackman, a well-known military vehicle photographer. The current editor is Andrew Stone, a British-South African journalist based in the UK.

It was first published in May 2001 (cover dated June 2001). In the same month, another magazine covering the same subject, Military Machines International, also began publication. This was at a time when the long-running quarterly, Wheels & Tracks magazine, had ceased publication, leaving a gap in the market.

Starting with the December 2014 issue Classic Military Vehicle merged with the magazine Military Machines International.
