= Airports of the World =

- Editor: Gordon Smith
- Categories: Aviation magazines
- Frequency: Bi-monthly
- Founded: 2005
- First issue: September-October 2005
- Company: Key Publishing
- Country: United Kingdom
- Based in: Stamford, Lincolnshire
- Language: English
- Website: http://www.airportsworld.com/

Airports of the World was a bi-monthly magazine which looked at the people and companies that make up many of the world's airports. Following the publication of its 100th and final issue in February 2022, it was amalgamated into sister title Airliner World. The headquarters is in Stamford, Lincolnshire, England.
