= Airfix Model World =

- Airfix Model World, March 2014
- Editor: Chris Clifford
- Categories: Hobby Magazine
- Frequency: Monthly
- Total circulation (June 2016): 12,730
- First issue: December 2010
- Company: Key Publishing
- Country: United Kingdom
- Language: English
- Website: www.airfixmodelworld.com
- ISSN: 2045-1202

Airfix Model World is a monthly magazine published in the United Kingdom by Key Publishing since 2010, produced under licence from Airfix. It covers the hobby of plastic modelmaking, particularly model aircraft, but also including model cars, ships, sci-fi/spacecraft, armoured vehicles and figures. It is effectively the successor to an earlier publication, Airfix Magazine, which ceased in 1993.
