= Buses (magazine) =

UK transport magazine

- Front cover of the magazine (2024)
- Editor: James Day
- Former editors: Alan Millar
- Categories: Bus and coach
- Frequency: Monthly
- Publisher: Key Publishing
- Total circulation: 10,752 (2021)
- Founder: Ian Allan
- Founded: 1949; 77 years ago
- First issue: November 1949; 76 years ago
- Country: United Kingdom
- Based in: Stamford, Lincolnshire
- Language: English
- Website: keybuses.com
- ISSN: 0007-6392

Buses is a monthly magazine published in the United Kingdom that the British bus and coach industry. Founded in 1949, the magazine was originally published by Ian Allan Publishing before transferring to Key Publishing in March 2012 following the latter's acquisition of Ian Allan's magazine division. The magazine is currently edited by James Day and is published on the third Thursday of each month. An accompanying annual yearbook is also published each August from the following year.

Since 2014, the publisher operates annual show every August called 'Buses Festival' at the British Motor Museum in Gaydon, Warwickshire. Buses Festival is one of the largest shows for bus enthusiasts to see modern and classic vehicles on display and for traders to sell bus models, literature, photos and bus accessories.

== History ==
Buses was published as Buses Illustrated by Ian Allan Publishing from 1949 until 1968. The magazine started publishing in its usual monthly cycle from January 1969. On 19 July 1968, coinciding with the passage of the Transport Act 1968, it was relaunched as simply Buses following the absorption of sister monthly publication Passenger Transport, which had been acquired from publisher Barrow's earlier in the decade.

A sister magazine, Buses Focus, featured more in-depth articles, but was dropped after a rationalisation of the bus industry and for publishing cost reasons.

=== Editors ===
- Charles Dunbar: 1949–1950
- E J Smith: 1950–1959
- Alan Townsin: 1959–1965
- John Parke: 1965–1980
- Stephen C Morris: 1980–1999
- Alan Millar: 1999–2021
- James Day: 2021–

== See also ==
- Coach & Bus Week
- Commercial Motor
