= Aeroplane (magazine) =

British aviation magazine

- Issue 1 of Aeroplane Monthly, published in May 1973, featuring the last airworthy de Havilland Mosquito.
- Categories: Aviation
- Frequency: Monthly
- Founder: Richard T. Riding
- First issue: May 1973
- Company: Key Publishing
- Country: United Kingdom
- Based in: Stamford, Lincolnshire
- Language: English
- Website: www.key.aero/aeroplanemonthly
- ISSN: 0143-7240

Aeroplane (formerly Aeroplane Monthly) is a British magazine devoted to aviation, with a focus on aviation history and preservation.

== Aeroplane Monthly ==
Issue 1 of Aeroplane Monthly was published in May 1973 at a cover price of 30p, in association with Flight International, by IPC Media. The founder was Richard T. Riding (1942–2019), whose father, E.J. Riding, had been photographer for The Aeroplane magazine of the 1940s. The magazine is now owned by Key Publishing Ltd and headquartered in Stamford, Lincolnshire.

The magazine is the successor to an earlier, weekly publication called The Aeroplane, founded in 1911.

== See also ==
- Air Enthusiast - defunct magazine, similar in nature to The Aviation Historian
- The Aviation Historian - British magazine covering classic aeroplanes and the history of flying
