= Airliner World =

English aviation magazine

- Cover of the April 2023 issue
- Editor: Thomas Haynes
- Categories: Aviation magazines
- Frequency: Monthly
- Circulation: 28,700 (Jan-Dec 2018)
- First issue: May 1999
- Company: Key Publishing
- Country: United Kingdom
- Based in: Stamford, Lincolnshire
- Language: English
- ISSN: 1465-6337

Airliner World is an aviation magazine published by Key Publishing in Stamford, Lincolnshire, England. In the United States, the magazine is distributed from the Key Publishing office in Avenel, New Jersey.

The first edition of Airliner World was published in May 1999 and is now the UK’s biggest selling monthly civil aviation magazine.

Airliner World is dedicated to airlines and airliners. The magazine publishes worldwide aviation news, as well as articles on regional and worldwide airports and airlines. Another airline publication, Air International, does not represent competition, since both magazines are published by Key Publishing. Airliner World is part of a group of aviation magazines published by Key, including AIR International, Air Forces Monthly, and sister magazine, Airports of the World.
