= Roadgeek =

Person with an interest in roads

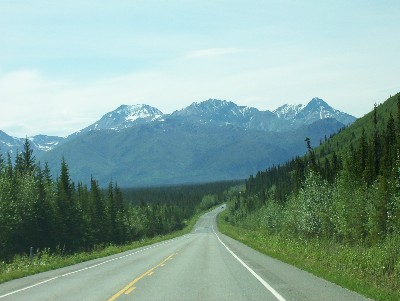
Driving south on Alaska Tok Cutoff Highway.

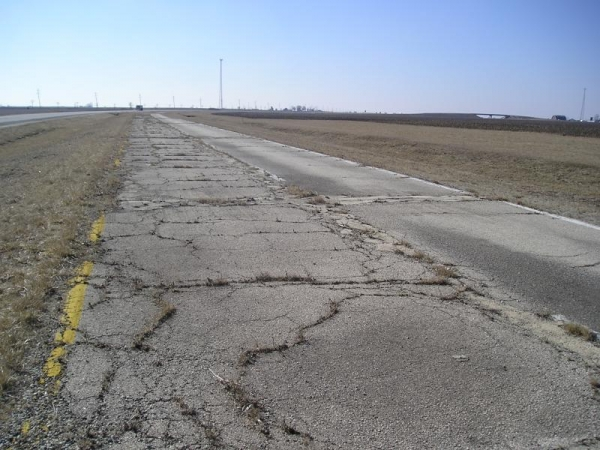
An abandoned early U.S. Route 66 alignment in southern Illinois in 2006.

A roadgeek (from road + geek) is a person involved in "roadgeeking" or "road enthusiasm", an enthusiasm for roads, fond of road trips as a hobby.

== Interest ==
Roadgeeks view their interest as an appreciation of engineering and planning feats:

We're interested in all the effort that goes into making roads. The railways in this country get an awful lot of press as great engineering achievements. Roads aren't seen in that way, but it wasn't always so. In the 1950s and 1960s they were part of a brave new era. Back then it was something to get excited about. They actually put people on buses and drove up and down them to have a look...

— Steven Jukes

The numbering zones for A-roads in Great Britain

FHWA Series fonts—also known as Highway Gothic or the Interstate typeface

Roadgeeks are not necessarily interested in motor vehicles; there may also be an interest in cartography and map design. Enthusiasts may focus on a single activity related to roads, such as driving the full length of a highway (known as 'clinching') or researching the history, planning and quirks of a particular road or national highway system. Sometimes, road geeks are called "highway historians" for the knowledge and interests.

Even the numbering system can be a subject of deep interest, as Joe Moran describes in his book "On Roads: A Hidden History":

On the online discussion forum of SABRE, the Society for All British Road Enthusiasts (sic), the 1400-odd Sabristi often debate about where the M25 starts and whether it is correctly numbered, or why the motorway from Carlisle to Glasgow is called both the M74 and the A74(M). In road-numbering lore, the absence of pattern—the discovery that there are so many exceptions to rules that the rules might as well not exist—only seems to revivify the search for inner mysteries. Road buffs talk in reverential tones about "David Craig Numbers" - the elegant theory, named after the man who proposed it, that three digit numbers derive from the roads they connect.

== Online ==
In 2002, the St. Louis Post-Dispatch reported that road enthusiasm was an Internet phenomenon. There is a Usenet newsgroup, misc.transport.road, where participants discuss all facets of roads and road trips from "construction projects to quirks and inconsistencies in signage". Those who await each annual Rand McNally road atlas release found a community of others online who were also interested in roads as a hobby. These communities of people could share photos, swap their thoughts on the highways in their areas and "debate the finer points of interchange design".

Web based forums are popular; one of the largest is AARoads Forum.

=== SABRE ===
Started in 1999, the Society for All British and Irish Road Enthusiasts (SABRE), originally known as "Study and Appreciation of the British Roads Experience", is one of the larger and most prominent communities of road enthusiasts online. The organization hosts a large collection of articles and histories of particular roads and terminology, online photo galleries, discussion forums, and an application to overlay and compare historical roadmaps. Although SABRE is primarily an online group, members organize group tours to visit sites of interest.

=== Taiwan websites ===
In 2006, a board called "Road" (Chinese: 公路板) in the PTT Bulletin Board System, which is a Taiwanese forum, was established. Because some Taiwanese road enthusiasts didn't know how to use a terminal or BBS reader to access it, the web forum Taiwan Highway Club (Chinese: 公路邦; literally, "Highway State") was started in 2008. It contains subforums where users discuss road policies and post highway news and images.

== Relationship with governments ==
In Taiwan, the Ministry of Transportation and Communications' Directorate General of Highways (公路總局) has held occasional Road Fan Conferences (公路迷座談會) since 2011 where roadfans and highway transportation-related organizations made suggestions to the government.
