= Bus preservation in the United Kingdom =

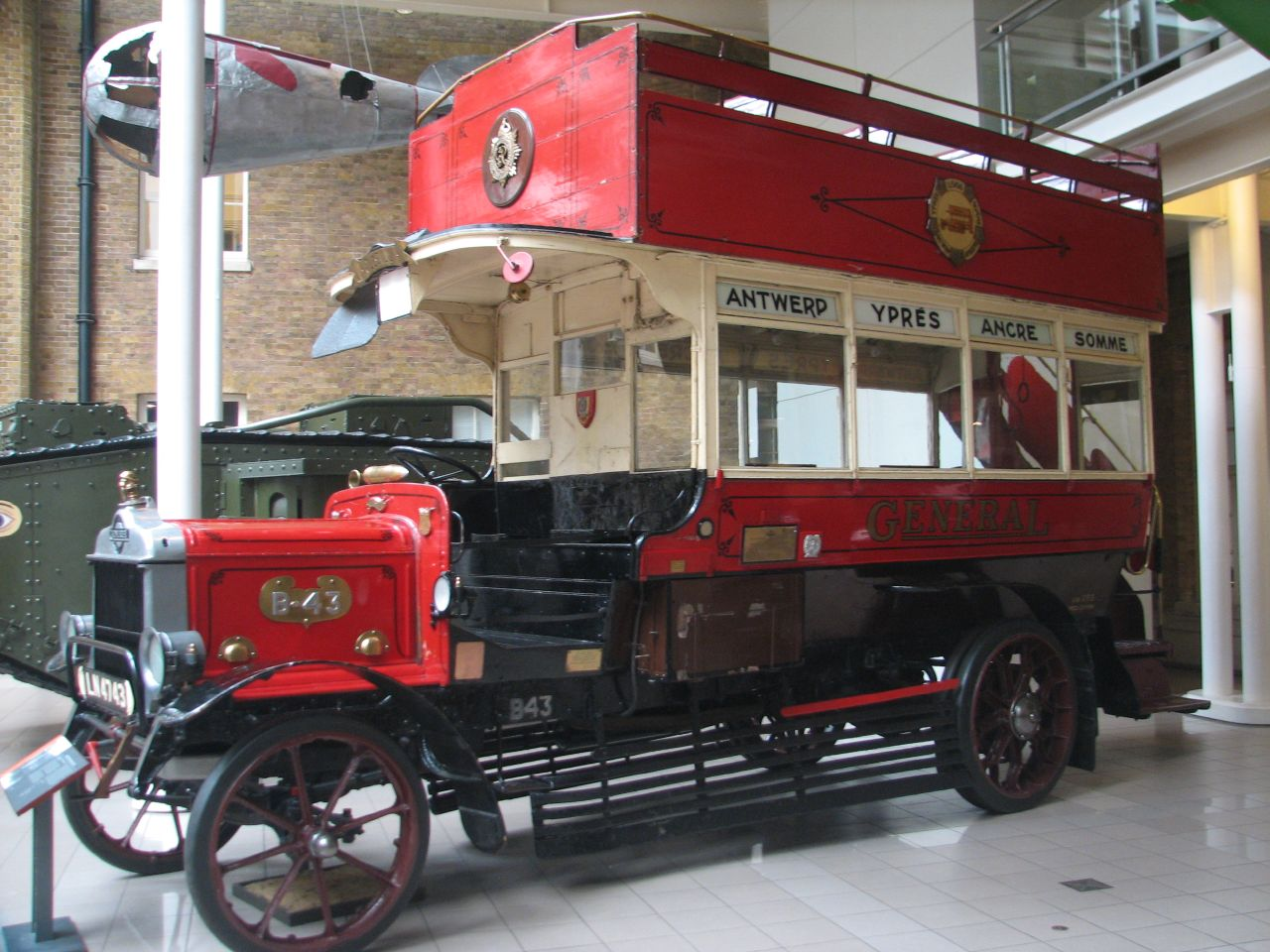
1911 preserved bus

In common with cars and trucks, preservation of buses in the United Kingdom is a hobby activity enjoyed by many people, both actively or passively. The active preservation and operation of preserved buses is undertaken by private individuals, organised trusts or societies, and even commercial operators. The preserved bus fleet in the UK includes dating from the earliest pre-war models right up to models manufactured after the year 2000.

== History ==
The earliest examples of bus preservation were undertaken by certain bus companies themselves, especially the London General Omnibus Company who set aside a member bus from the B, S and K classes, followed by the London Passenger Transport Board who preserved one each of the NS, LT, ST and T classes. These can now all be seen at the London Transport Museum at Covent Garden.

The first example of private individuals preserving a bus in the UK was by four friends, Prince Marshall, Ken Blacker, Ron Lunn and Michael Dryhurst in 1956 who successfully purchased a 1929 AEC Regal fleet number T31, registration UU 6646, for the sum of £40. It was the last ex-London General Omnibus Company vehicle to be operated by London Transport. The bus is still in existence and was fully restored by Norman Anscomb and is now part of the London Bus Museum collection, who purchased it from Norman Anscomb in 1994. This was the first of several buses purchased by these four pioneers of the British bus preservation movement, which included a 1935 Gilford 168SD coach, a Leyland PLSC3 Lion, and their first double-decker, a Northern Counties bodied AEC Renown 6-wheeler which cost the large sum (for the time) of £85. In 1958 Ken Blacker, John Cook, Prince Marshall and Michael Dryhurst inaugurated the Vintage Passenger Vehicle Society.

The October 1961 issue of the Ian Allan magazine Buses Illustrated published a list of 76 buses believed to be the total number of preserved buses in the UK. As of 2009 it was believed the number of preserved buses in the UK numbered over 5,000.

== Non-commercial preservation ==
Many non-commercial organisations dedicated to bus preservation operate under a charitable status. Some projects receive Heritage Lottery Fund grant funding.

Non commercial bus preservation organisations can be both general in scope, or organised around preserving vehicles from a particular geographic area or time periods. Often, organisations will focus on a particular much loved company or operator, such as SELNEC, Southdown Motor Services or Ribble Motor Services, or particular manufacturers such as AEC or Bristol Commercial Vehicles. In cases where large numbers of vehicles were produced, organisations may even concentrate on a single model, such as the Bristol VR or Leyland National.

Preserved buses are often included in the collections of Transport Museums, and sometimes feature in general museums. In some cases, museums are dedicated to buses as their main activity. The use of operational preserved buses often contribute to the authentic atmosphere in living history museums such as Amberley Working Museum and Beamish Museum.

Operational preserved buses are often exhibited at rallies and shows, or are run on 'running days', or in events that are a combination of the two. A preserved bus running a specific shuttle route also often forms part of a larger event such as a cultural festival.

Several events in the preservation calendar are regular, usually annual, while others are often organised to commemorate a specific event, such as the anniversary of a particular company or particular vehicle type coming into or out of existence or service. Running days often mark the withdrawal of particular models from a route, or the demise of particular companies. Rallies and shows often combine preserved exhibits and current service vehicles.

Candidates vehicles for preservation are often gifted or purchased from their final operator, or are bought from the scrap yard or specialist dealers. Restoration of vehicles often involves mechanical restoration such as repanelling the bodywork, and the reversion of the vehicle's appearance to a particular historical period, by repainting into a particular livery and restoring other parts such as grilles or displays. On occasion, buses have been saved for preservation having been used long after the end of their passenger transport career, and been used in a variety of capacities such as caravans or storage sites, requiring more thorough preservation.

== Commercial preservation ==
A form of bus preservation involves the commercial operation of vintage or restored buses. Some present day bus companies maintain and operate a heritage fleet for both preservation and commercial purposes, such as the Arriva Heritage Fleet, and Stagecoach in Scotland. Others may maintain one or two examples of preserved vehicles for special services, or to act as company representatives at rallies and events.

If not actively involved, present day modern bus operators will often assist groups involved in preserving examples of their old vehicles, such as providing maintenance facilities or garaging facilities. Some niche commercial bus operators such as Timebus Travel exclusively exist for the purposes of heritage vehicle operation. Most commercial preserved bus operation is for private hire, although occasionally a preserved bus may appear on a scheduled service.

With the mass withdrawal of the iconic AEC Routemaster bus from London and the introduction of many new operators due to bus deregulation, many operators registered scheduled services around the country in the 1980s, long after the model was considered modern. Post millennium this is less common.

== Museums ==
Museums with over 10 bus exhibits include:

- Castle Point Transport Museum, Canvey Island, Essex
- London Bus Museum, Weybridge, Surrey
- Ensignbus bus museum, Essex
- East Anglia Transport Museum, Lowestoft, Suffolk
- Ipswich Transport Museum, Suffolk
- Glasgow Museum of Transport
- Isle of Man Transport Museum, Jurby
- Keighley Bus Museum, West Yorkshire
- Lincolnshire Road Transport Museum, North Hykeham
- London Transport Museum, Covent Garden
- Museum of Transport in Manchester, Cheetham
- North West Museum of Road Transport, St Helens, Merseyside
- Sandtoft Transport Centre
- Scottish Vintage Bus Museum, Lathalmond, Fife
- South Yorkshire Bus Museum, Rotherham, South Yorkshire
- Swansea Bus Museum, South Wales
- Town & District Transport Trust Ltd, Great Harwood, Lancashire
- Wirral Transport Museum, Birkenhead, Merseyside
- Wythall Transport Museum, Worcestershire

== Regulatory issues ==
The legal relationship between the operation of preserved buses and commercial buses is complex, depending variously on the age of the vehicle, age of the driver and circumstances of the operation.

Under the UK driving licence rules, anybody with a standard car licence gained before 1997 can drive a preserved bus over 30 years old without a PCV (passenger carrying vehicle) licence, as long as it is not for hire or reward, and less than 8 people are carried in the vehicle. For licences gained after 1997 and buses under 30 years old, the rules are more complex.

Depending on circumstances, operators of preserved buses may need to fit their vehicle with an analogue or digital tachograph. All commercial operation (not on a scheduled bus route) requires a tachograph. Drivers operating preserved buses for "non-commercial carriage of passengers" are exempt from the Driver Certificate of Professional Competence (Driver CPC) regulations.

With regard to the London low emission zone, an exemption is made for "Historic vehicles" (built before 1 January 1973). Preserved bus operators operating vehicles taxed as a 'bus' are exempt from the London congestion charge and do not have to register their vehicles. Those vehicles taxed as a Large Car are not exempt from the London congestion charge but can register for a 100% discount for their vehicle.

== Gallery ==
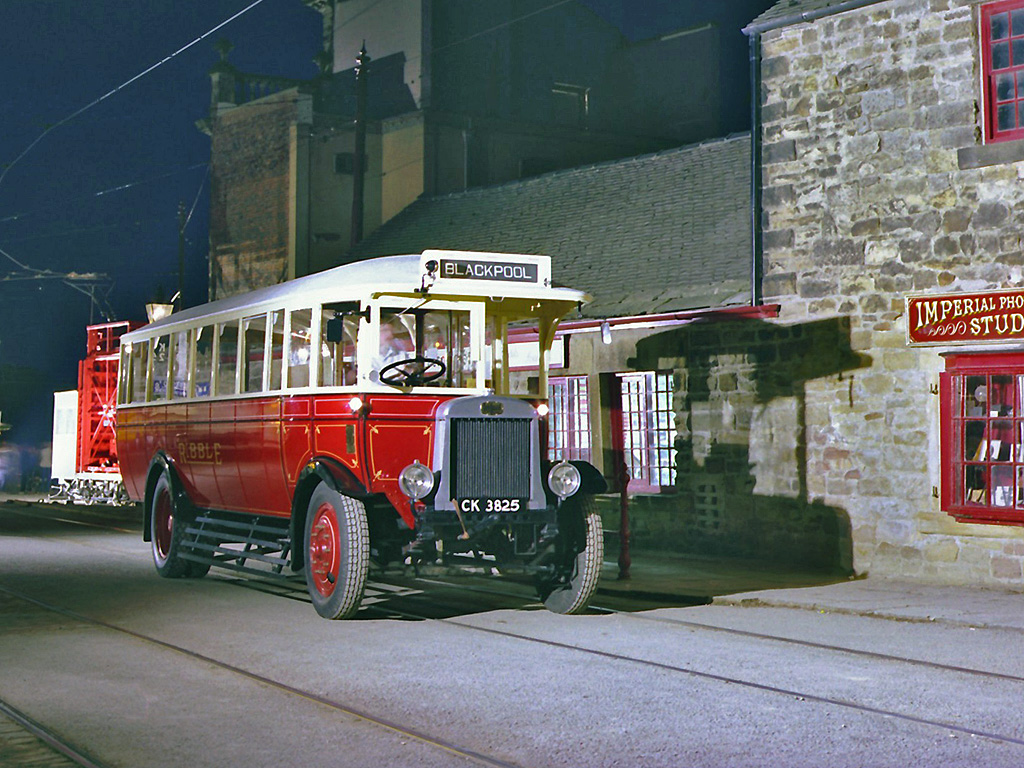
1927 preserved bus

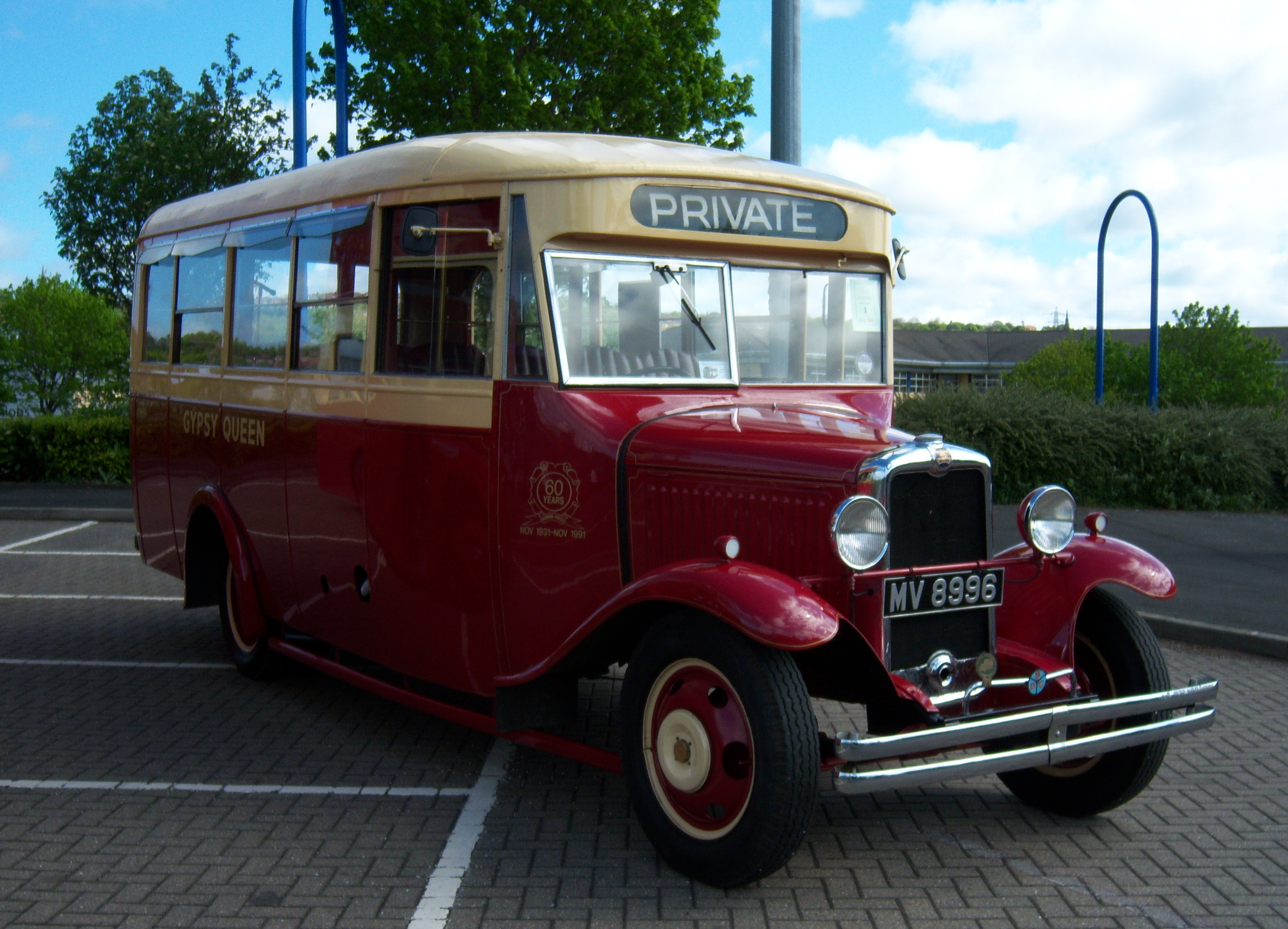
1931 preserved bus

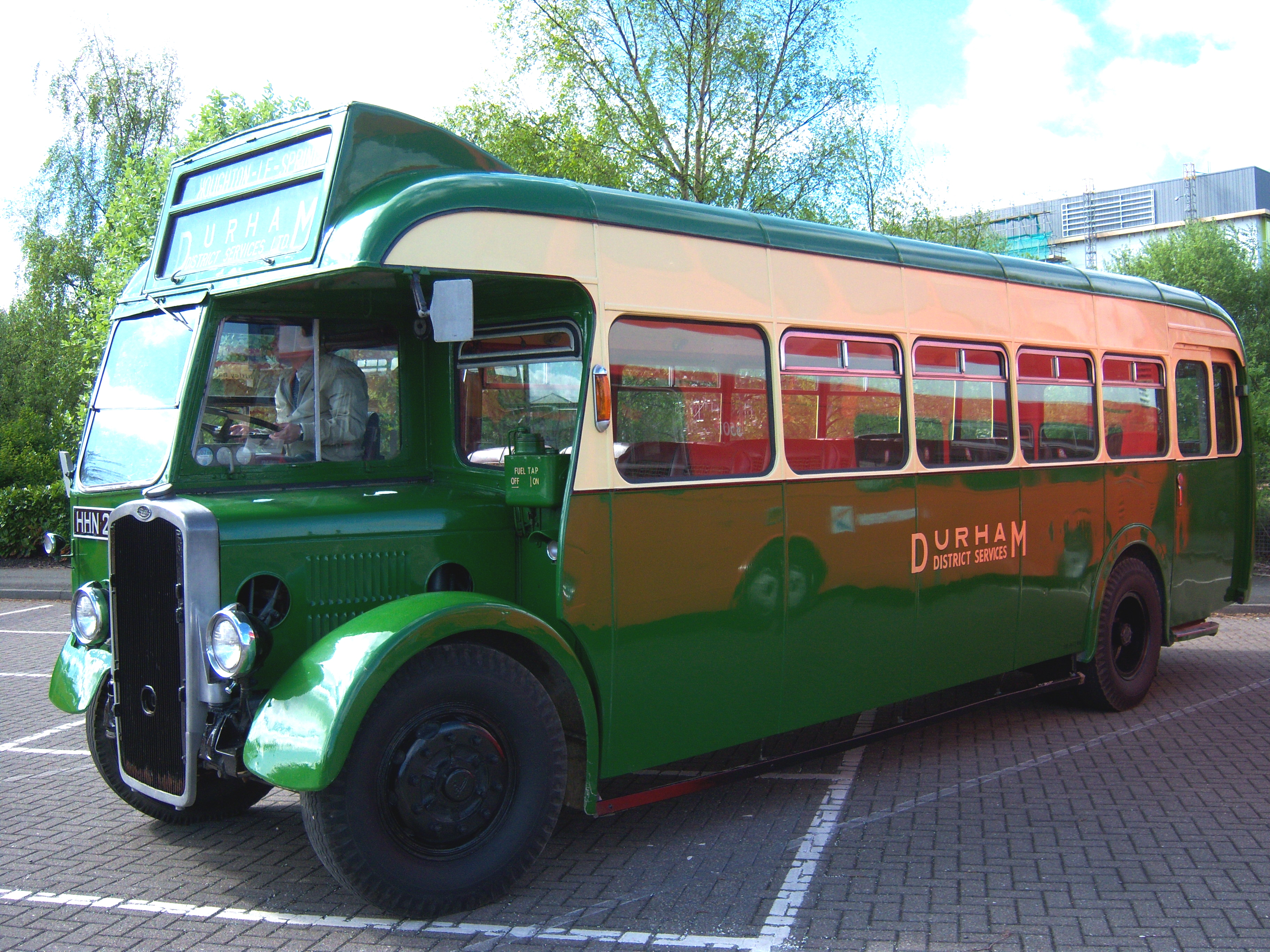
1947 preserved bus

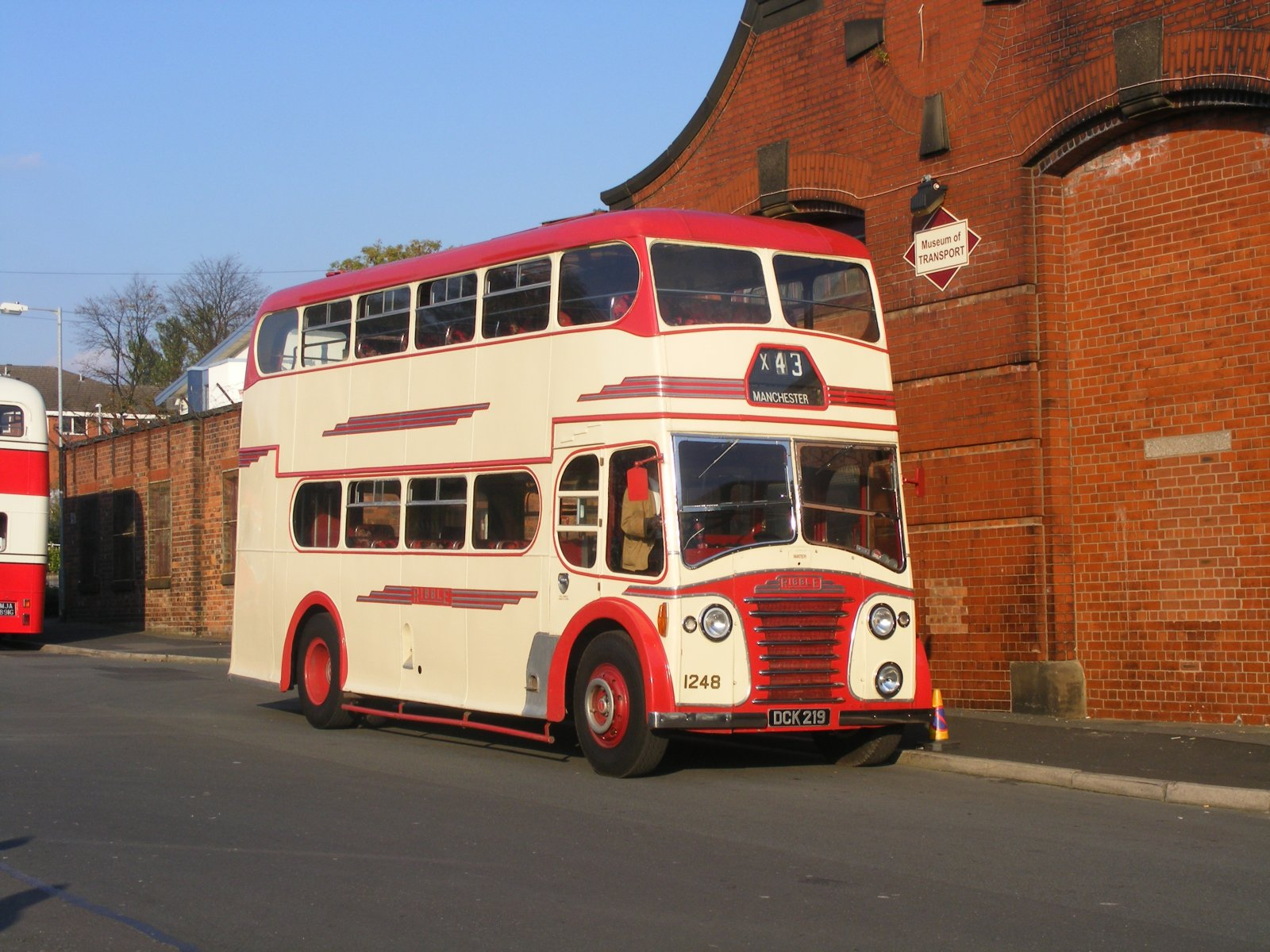
1951 preserved bus

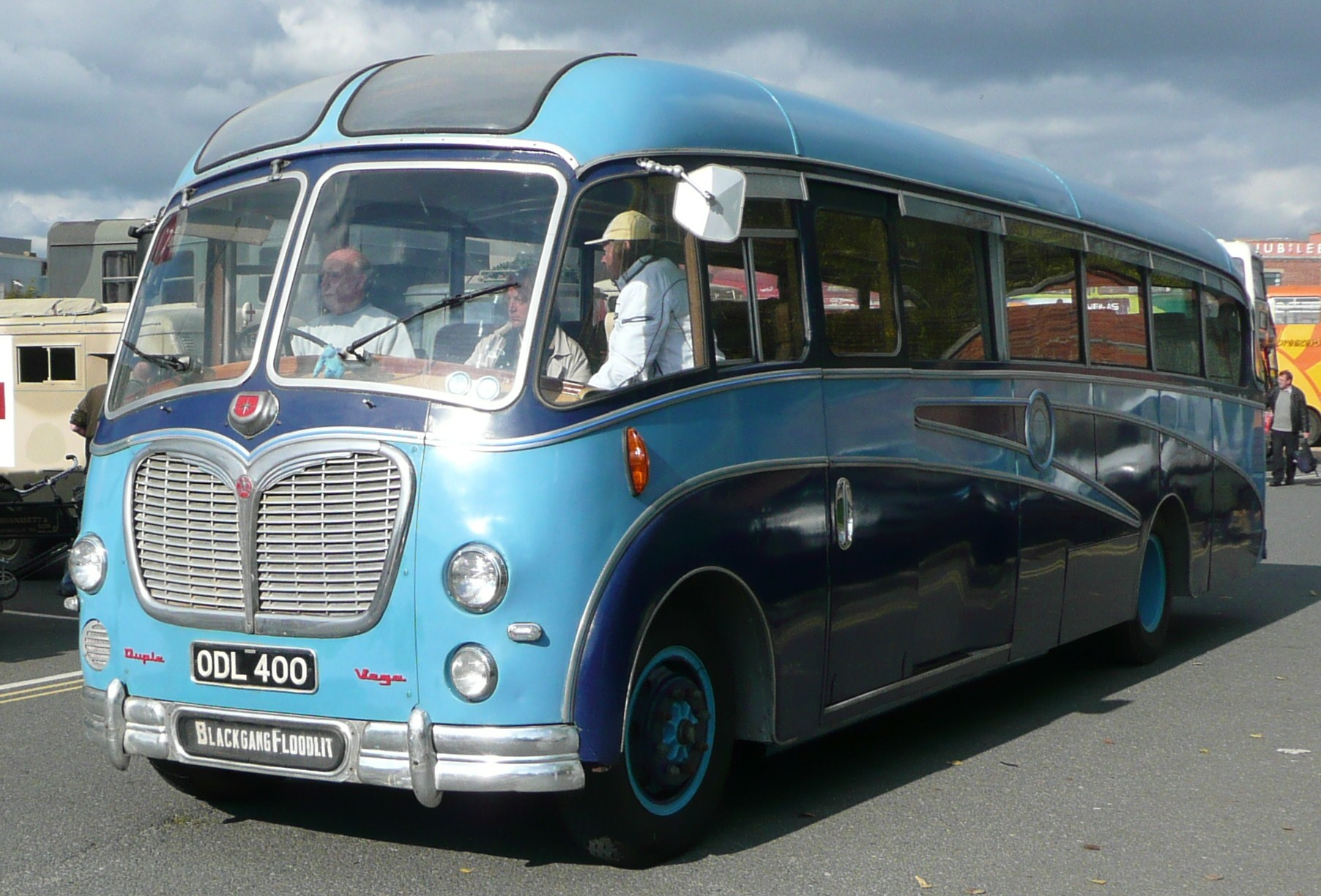
Bedford SB / Duple Vega 1957 preserved

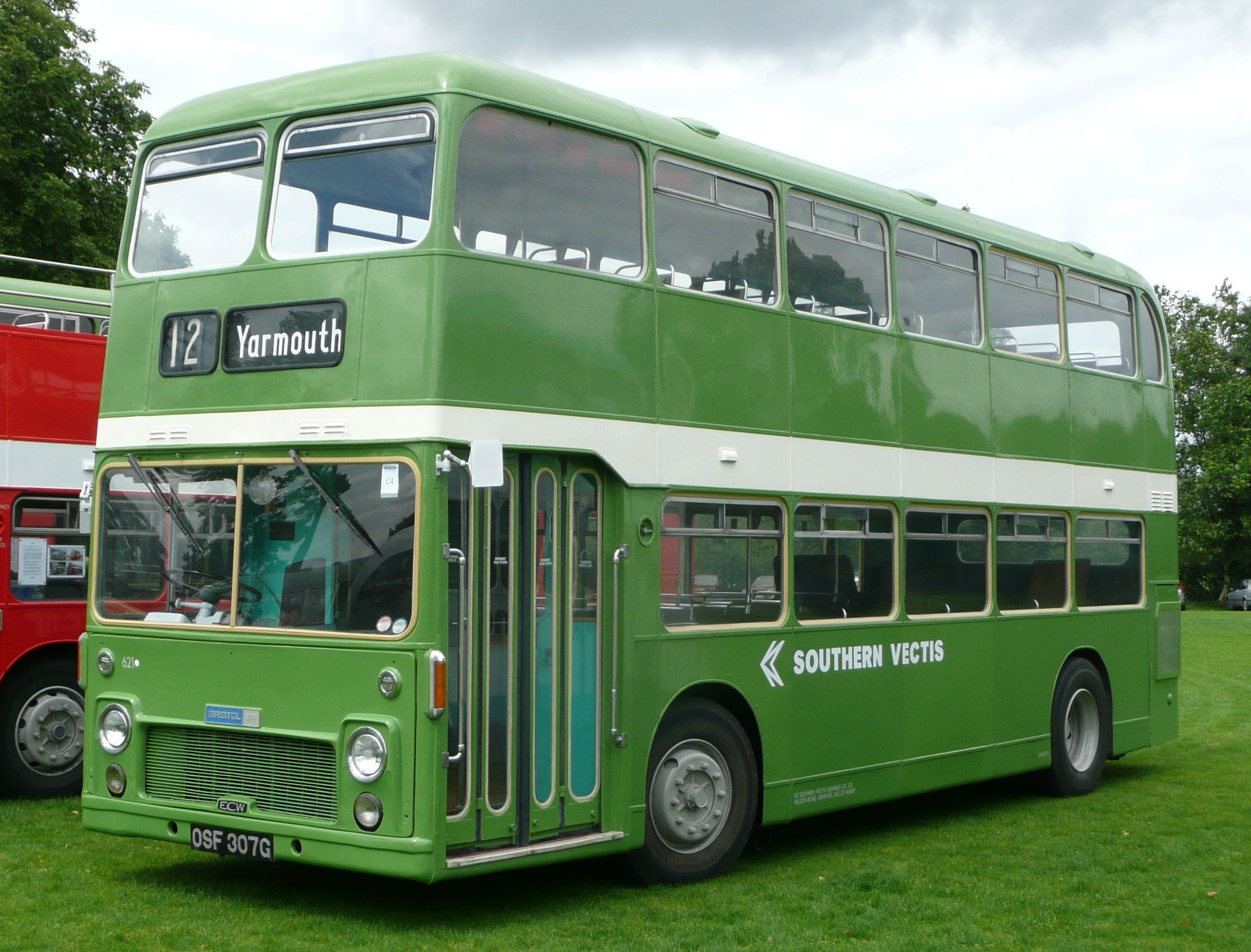
Bristol VR MkI / ECW 1969 preserved

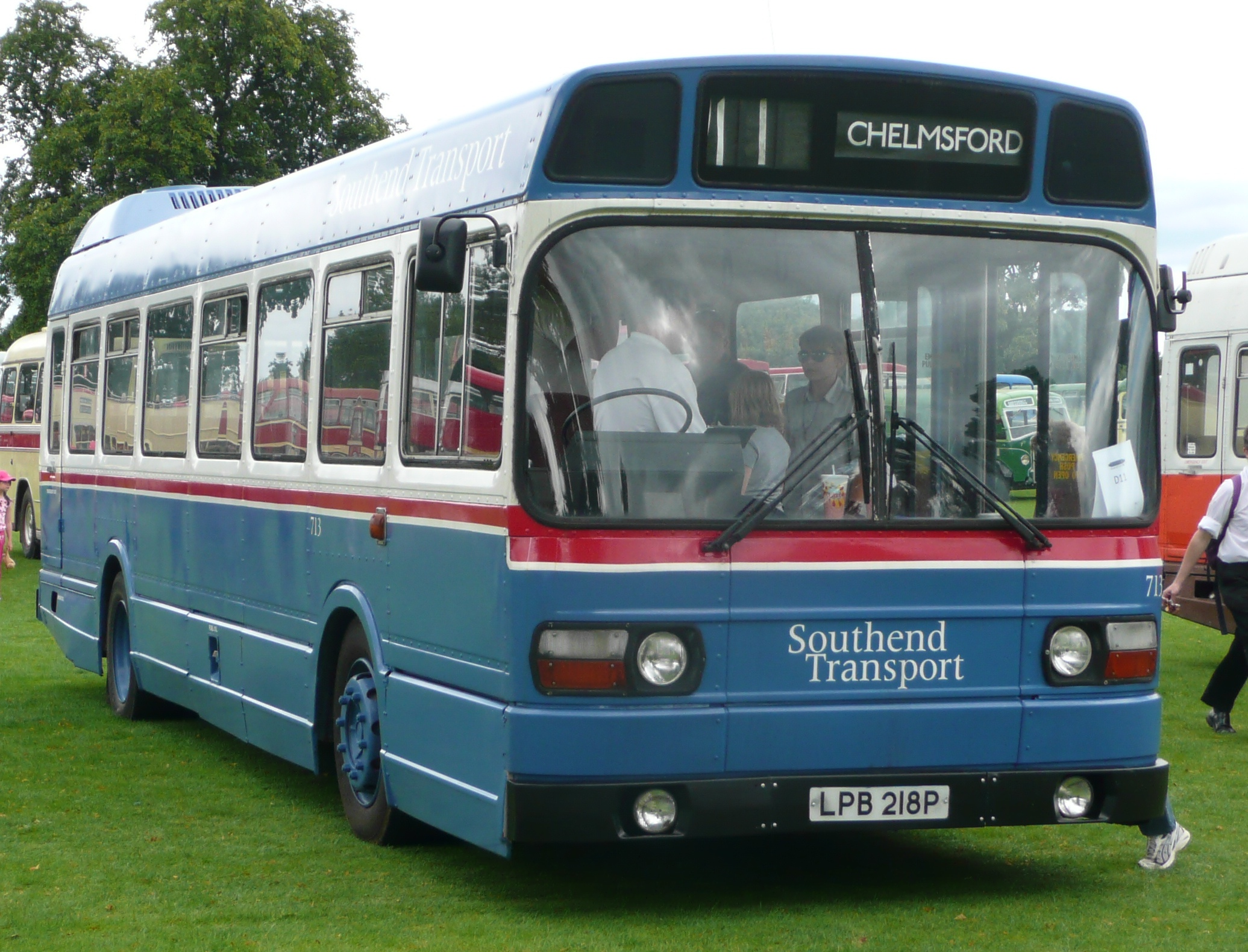
Leyland National 1976 preserved

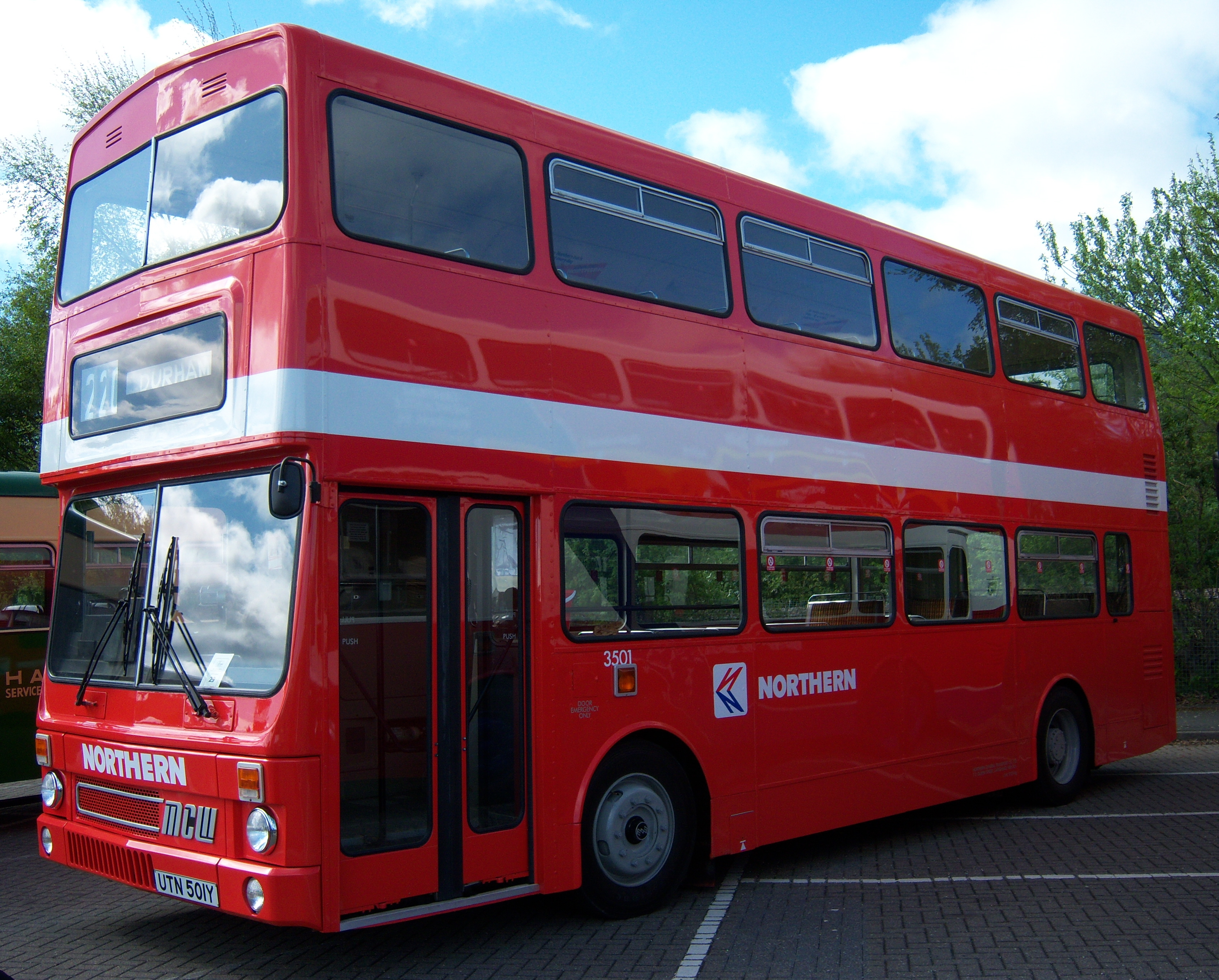
MCW MkII 1983 preserved

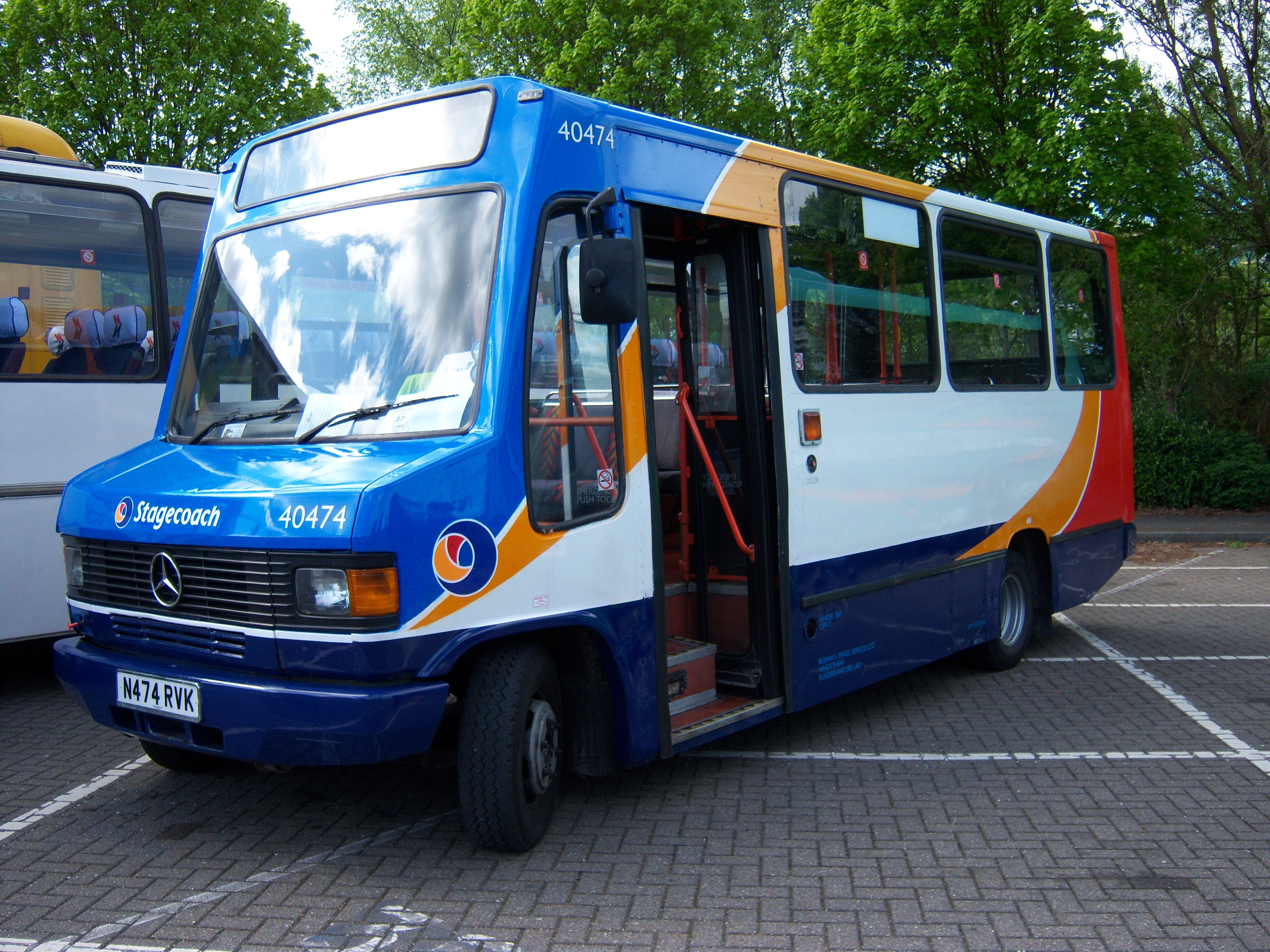
MB minibus 1995 preserved

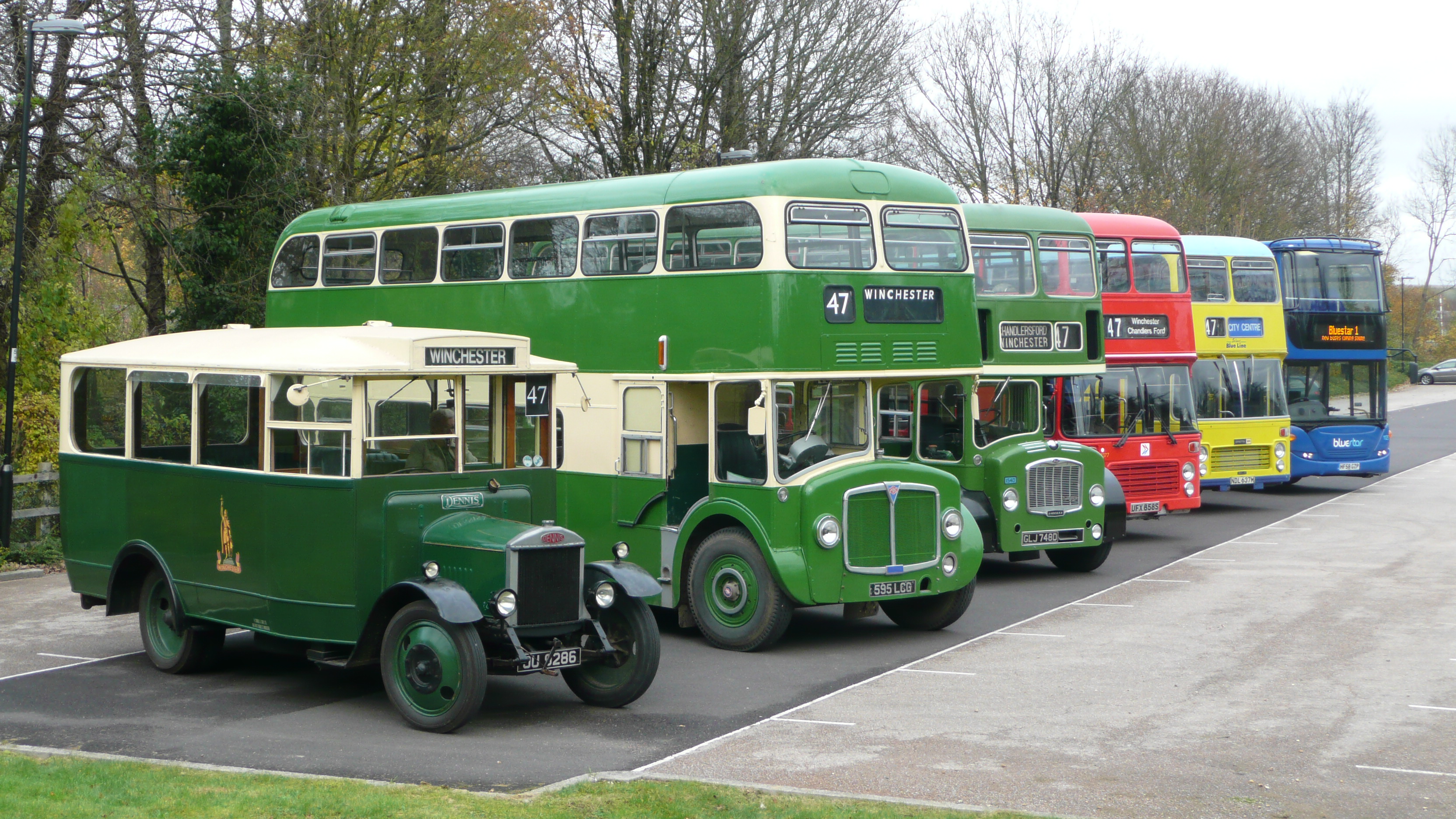
Preserved bus convoy line up organised to mark the relaunch of a bus route in Winchester

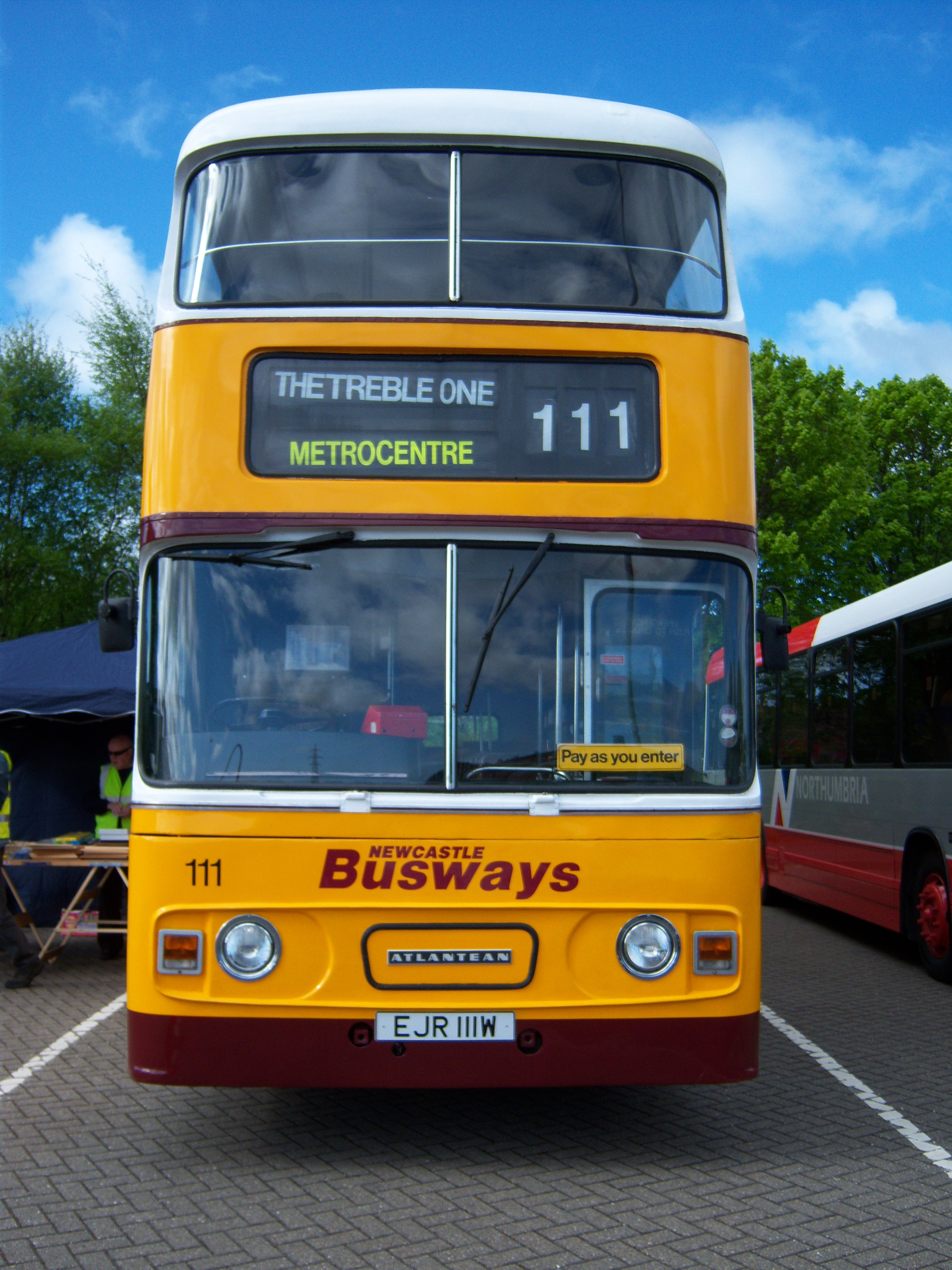
The preserved bus of the Treble One group at the 2009 Metrocentre rally, who restored it into its 1990s guise as Busways bus 111. The vehicle was obtained by the group from Busway's successor company, Stagecoach North East, who allow them to work on it and store it at one of their depots when not being exhibited

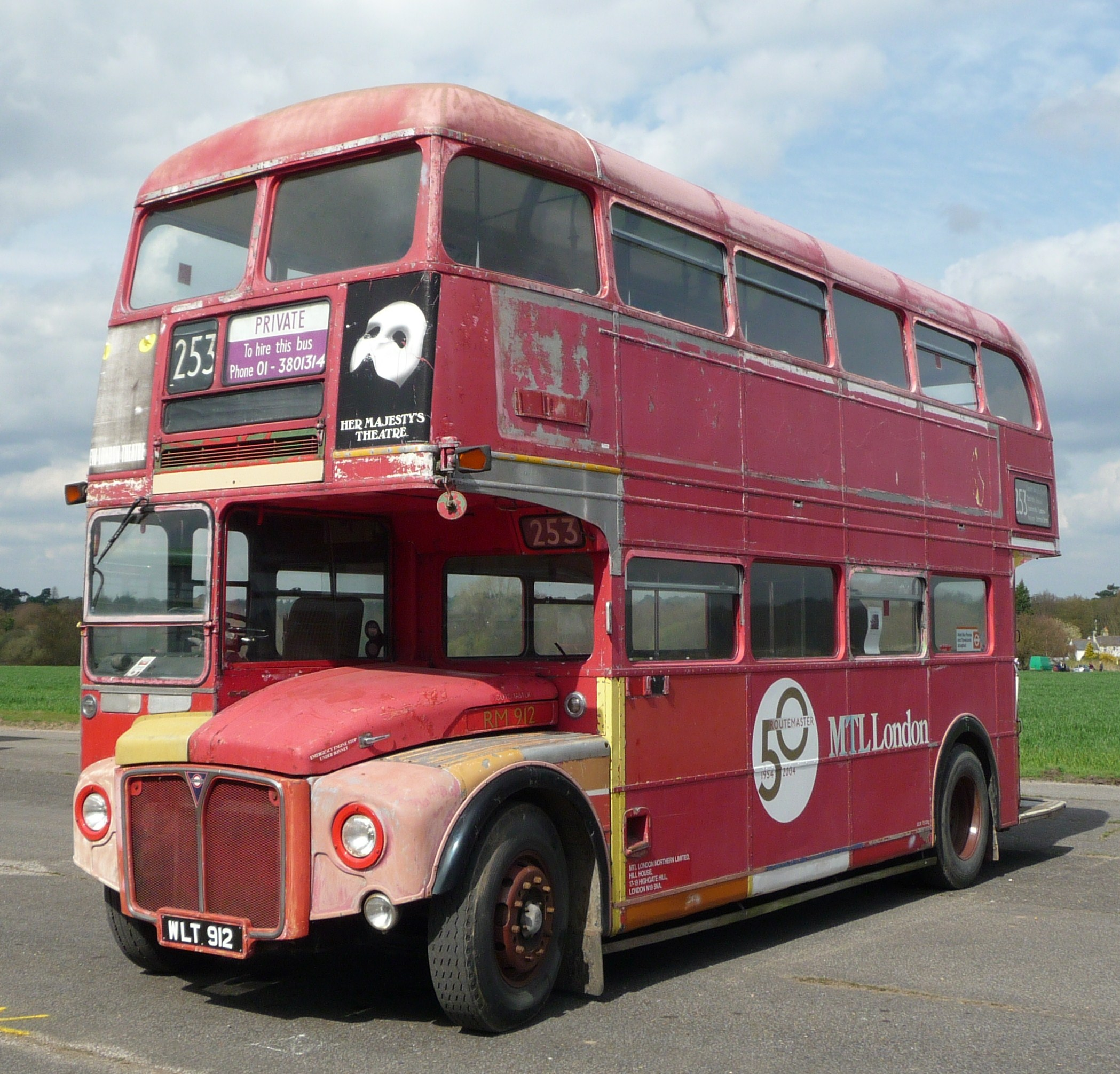
AEC Routemaster RM912 partially restored

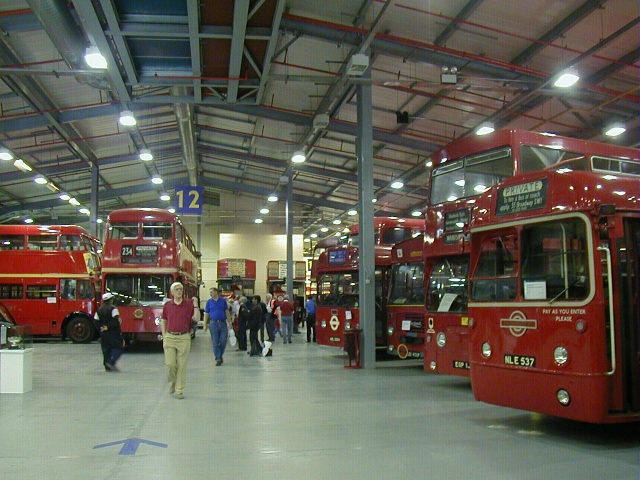
Buses in the Acton depot of the London Transport Museum

== See also ==
- List of museums in the United Kingdom
- London to Brighton events
- Transport Trust
