= Air Pictorial =

British aviation magazine

- Air Pictorial, July 1983
- Categories: Aviation magazines
- Frequency: Monthly
- Founded: 1939
- Final issue: 2002
- Company: HPC Publishing
- Country: United Kingdom
- Language: English

Air Pictorial was a British aviation magazine covering contemporary and historical military and civil aviation topics. By 2002, when the magazine was renamed Aviation News (a title that had been incorporated into it six years previously), Air Pictorial comprised 64 volumes containing 620 issues between them.

Initially published as Air Defence Corps Gazette in 1939, it was renamed to Air Training Corps Gazette: The Journal of the Air Training Corps in 1941, resetting the issue numbering to Vol.1 No.1 in the process. In 1946, the title was changed to Air Reserve Gazette, restarting the numbering at Vol.1 No.1 again. In January 1947 the numbering was reset to Vol.9 No.1, reflecting the cumulative volumes from 1939 to ease confusion. In 1951 Air Pictorial & Air Reserve Gazette was adopted, and in April 1958 the "& Air Reserve Gazette" part of the title was dropped, becoming Air Pictorial.

The magazine was produced at various times by the Air League, Rolls House Publishing Co., Profile Books and HPC Publishing, the latter being based in East Sussex.
