= Wheels & Tracks =

UK military history magazine

- Editor: Bart Vanderveen
- Categories: Military history
- Frequency: Quarterly
- Founded: 1982
- Company: Battle of Britain Prints International
- Country: United Kingdom
- ISSN: 0263-7081

Wheels & Tracks was a military history magazine covering the history of military vehicles worldwide published quarterly in the United Kingdom. The editor was Bart Vanderveen, who edited the publication from 1982 until his death in 2001. It was published by Battle of Britain Prints International Ltd., which also published After the Battle magazine. The final issue of Wheels & Tracks was issue 75, in April 2001.

Wheels & Tracks pre-dated later military vehicle magazines such as Classic Military Vehicles. According to Classic Military Vehicles editor John Carroll, Wheels & Tracks "gained a reputation around the world for its precise detail and accuracy".
