= Key Publishing =

Magazine publishing company

- Company type: Private
- Industry: Publishing
- Founded: December 1980
- Founder: Richard Cox
- Headquarters: Stamford, England
- Area served: UK
- Key people: Adrian Cox; Chief Executive
- Products: Aviation, rail, bus and modelling publications
- Number of employees: c.110
- Subsidiaries: Key Publishing Spain
- Website: www.keypublishing.com

Key Publishing is a magazine publishing company specialising in aviation titles, based in Stamford, Lincolnshire, England.

== History ==
Airliner World was launched in 1999. In 2005 it launched Airports of the World, and in the same year it bought PC Pilot (originally launched in 1999), the world's best selling flight simulation magazine.

In October 2009, Key Publishing bought Spain's leading aviation magazine Avion Revue, and its Latin American (Mexico and Argentina) editions, formerly owned by Motor Presse - Ibérica (a division of Europe's largest publishing firm - Gruner + Jahr). This magazine, along with Avion & Piloto, is published by Key Publishing Spain.

In March 2010, it bought the title Aviation News, which is Britain's longest established monthly aviation journal. Airfix Model World launched on 4 November 2010, in partnership with Airfix.

In March 2012, Key Publishing acquired several magazines previously published by Ian Allan Publishing. Titles included Modern Railways, Railways Illustrated, Vintage Roadscene, Hornby Magazine, Combat Aircraft, Classic Aircraft, and Buses.

== Products ==
As well as its core titles, it produces one-off titles for organisations such as the Royal Air Force. It produces the directories for the Society of British Aircraft Companies and the British Aviation Group. It produces the souvenir programme for the Farnborough Airshow.

=== Titles ===
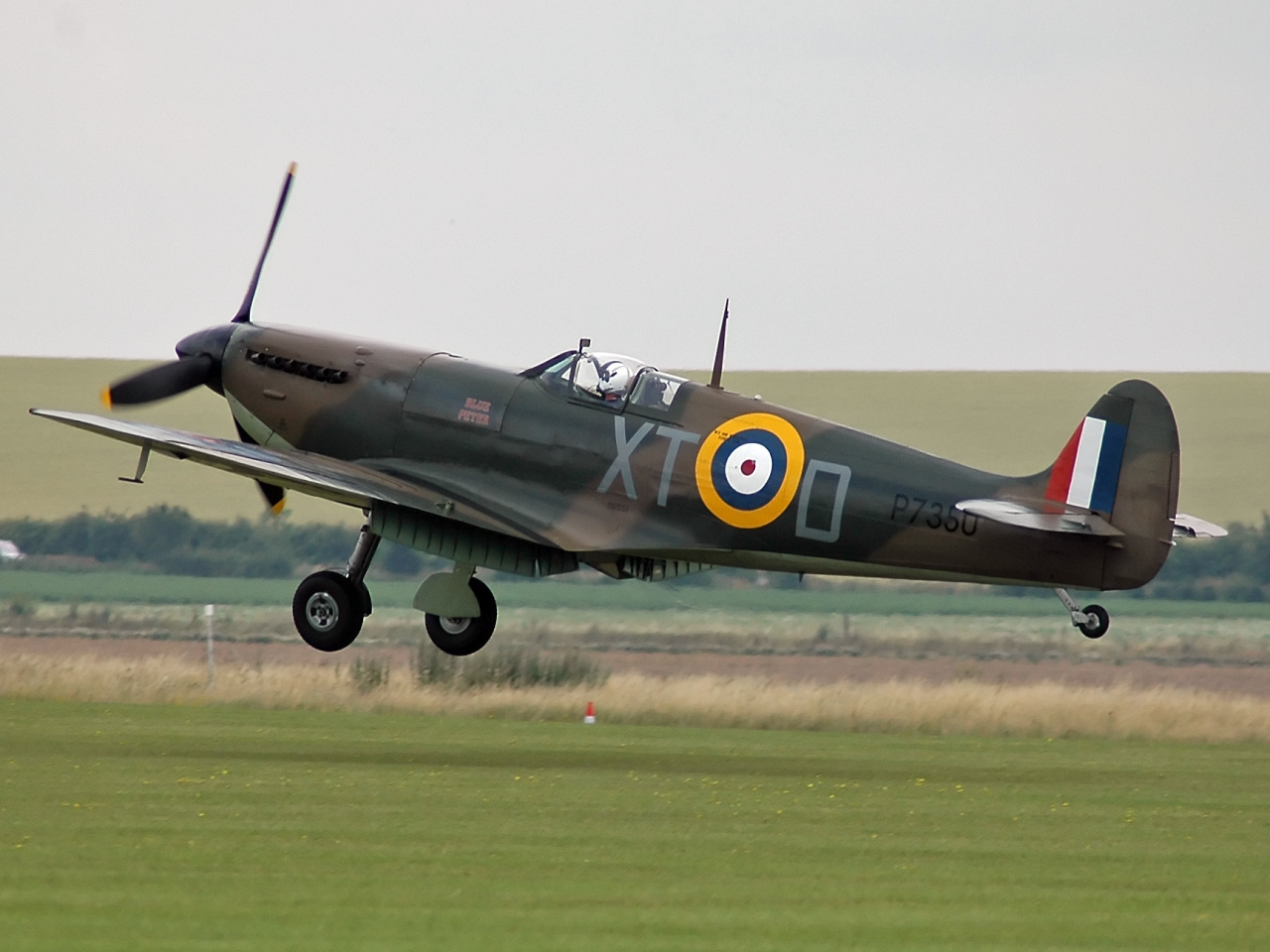
It has produced individual print run magazines on aviation topics such as the Battle of Britain

The following are publications of Key Publishing:

- Aeroplane
- AIR International
- Airfix Model World
- AirForces Monthly
- Airliner World
- Airports International
- Airports of the World
- Air Traffic Management
- Aviao Revue
- Aviation News
- Avion & Piloto
- Avion Revue Internacional, España
- Avion Revue Internacional, Latino America
- Bowls International
- Britain at War
- Britain's Buses
- Buses
- Classic Land Rover
- Classic Military Vehicle
- Combat Aircraft Monthly
- FlyPast
- Hornby Magazine
- Military Machines International
- MLI Plus, ceased November 2024
- Modern Railways
- PC Pilot
- Vintage Roadscene

== Websites ==
- Key.Aero
- Key Model World
- AirForces Daily
- AirForces Intelligence
- Key Shop

== Structure ==
It is sited on the A6121 in the very north of Stamford, not far from the former Stamford branch of the Great Northern Railway and the River Gwash (a tributary of the River Welland).
