= Air International =

Magazine in the United Kingdom

AIR International
- AIR International magazine, December 1999 issue
- Editor: Glenn Sands
- Categories: Aviation magazines
- Frequency: Monthly
- Circulation: 9,754 Jan-Dec 2016
- First issue: June 1971; 55 years ago
- Company: Key Publishing
- Country: United Kingdom
- Based in: Stamford, Lincolnshire
- Language: English
- Website: www.airinternational.com
- ISSN: 0306-5634
- OCLC: 1237957535

AIR International is a British aviation magazine covering current defence aerospace and civil aviation topics. It has been in publication since 1971 and is currently published by Key Publishing Ltd.

== History and profile ==
The magazine was first published in June 1971 with the name Air Enthusiast. In January 1974 its title was changed to Air Enthusiast International and finally to Air International in July 1974.

Air International is published by Key Publishing Limited. The magazine has its headquarters in Stamford, Lincolnshire. Sister publications include Air Forces Monthly, Airliner World, Airports International, FlyPast, and Today's Pilot (no longer published by Key Publishing).
