= Bus =

Large road vehicle for transporting people

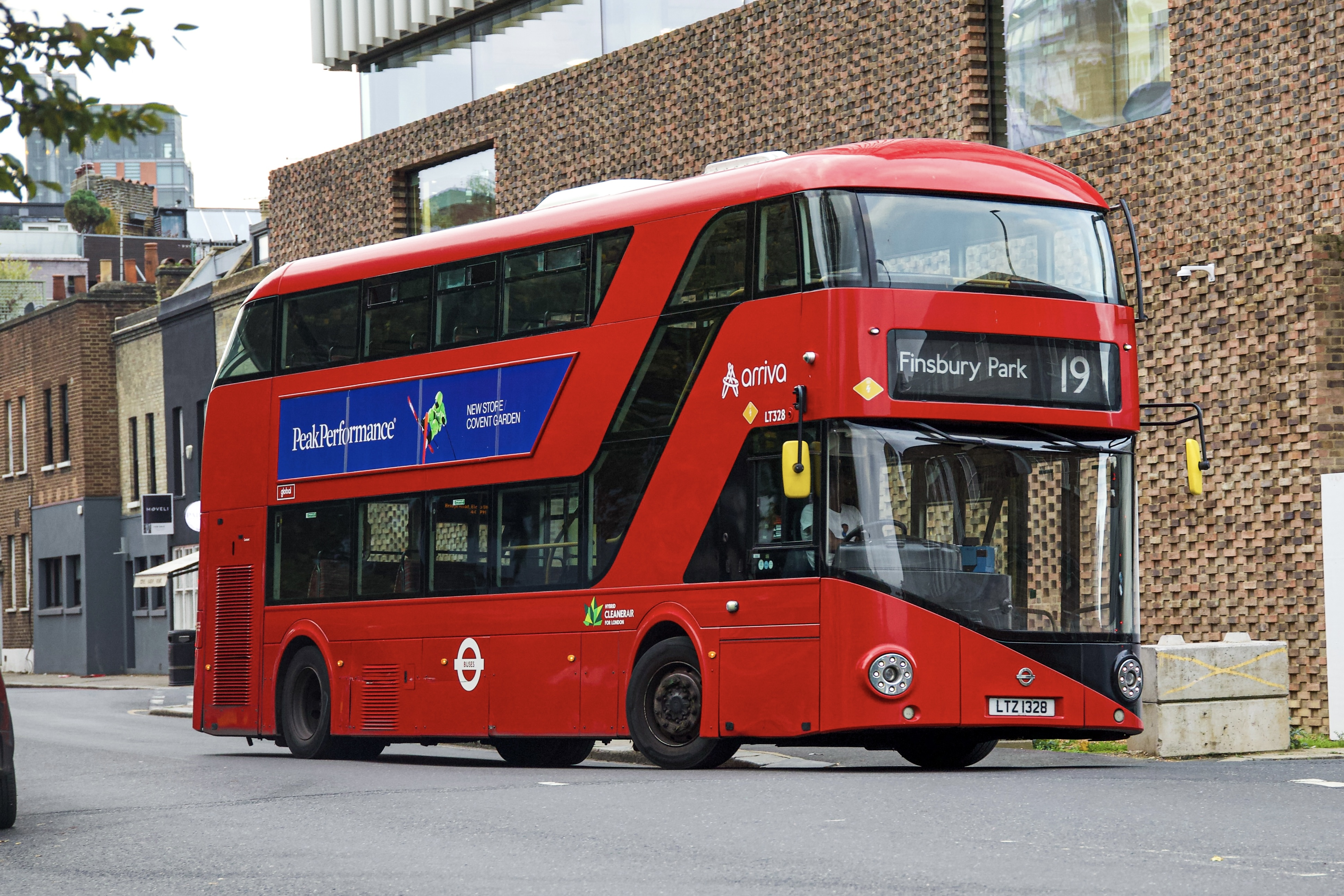
New Routemaster double-decker bus in London, United Kingdom

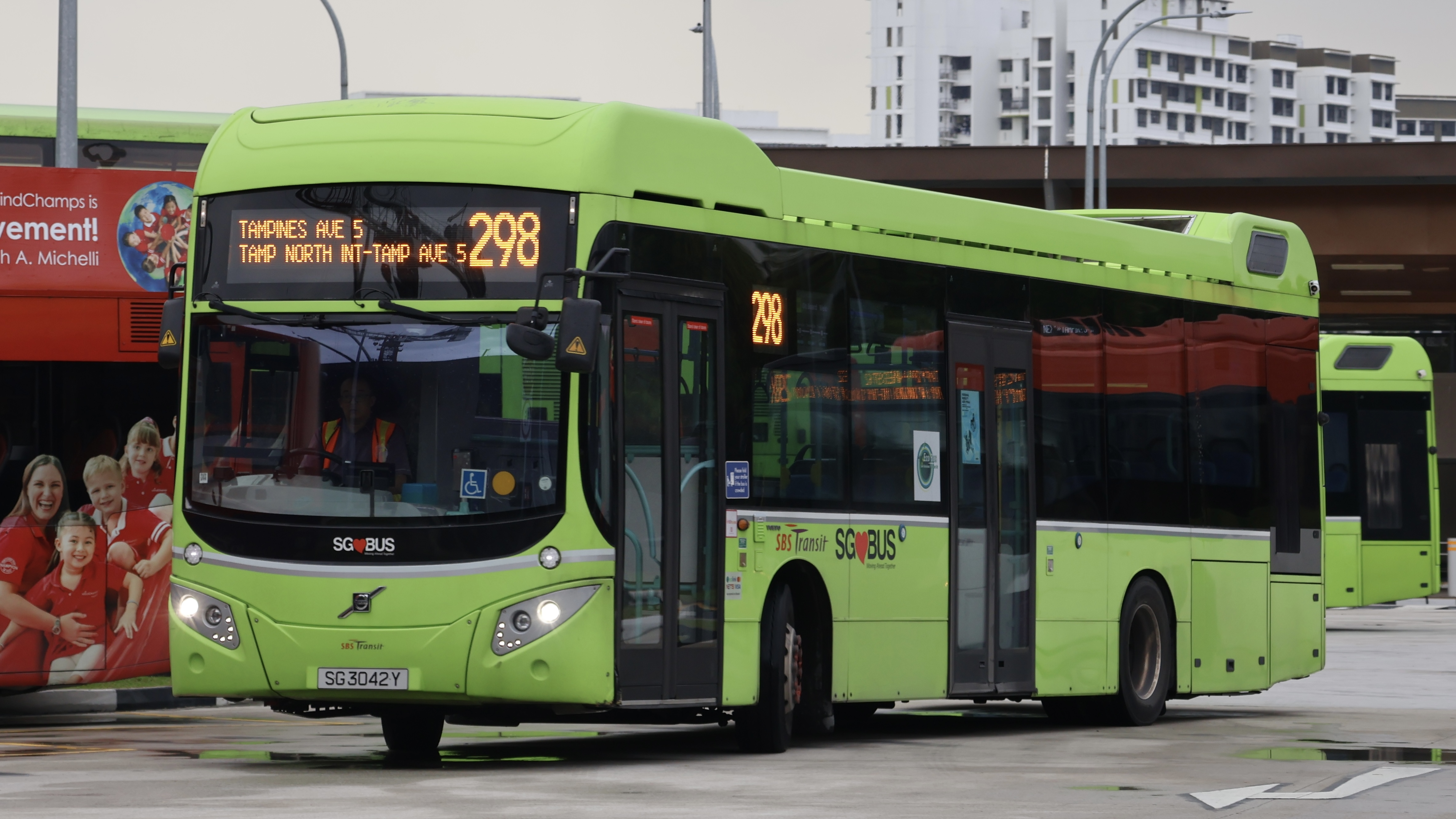
Volvo B5LH single-decker bus in Singapore

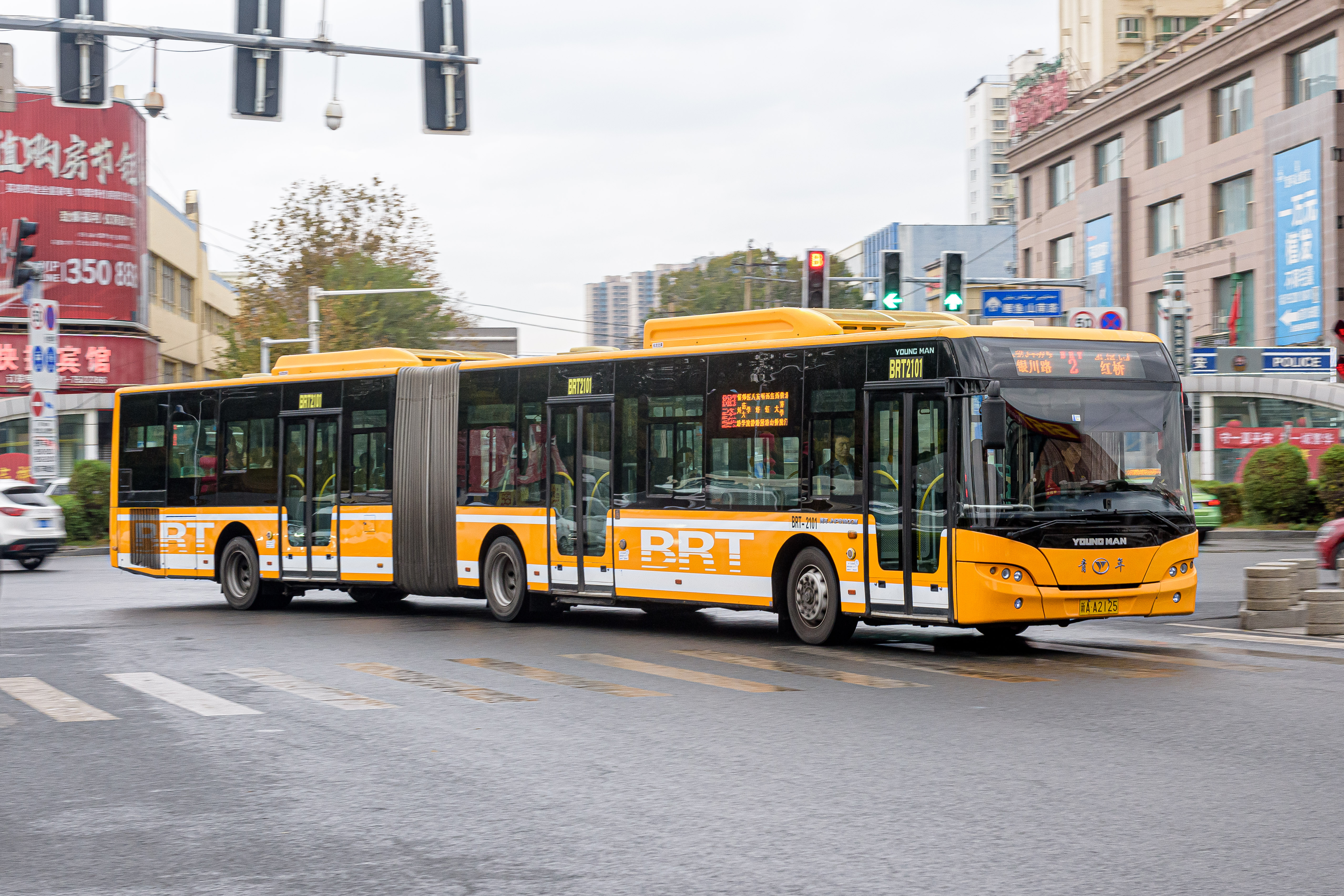
Youngman articulated bus in Ürümqi, China

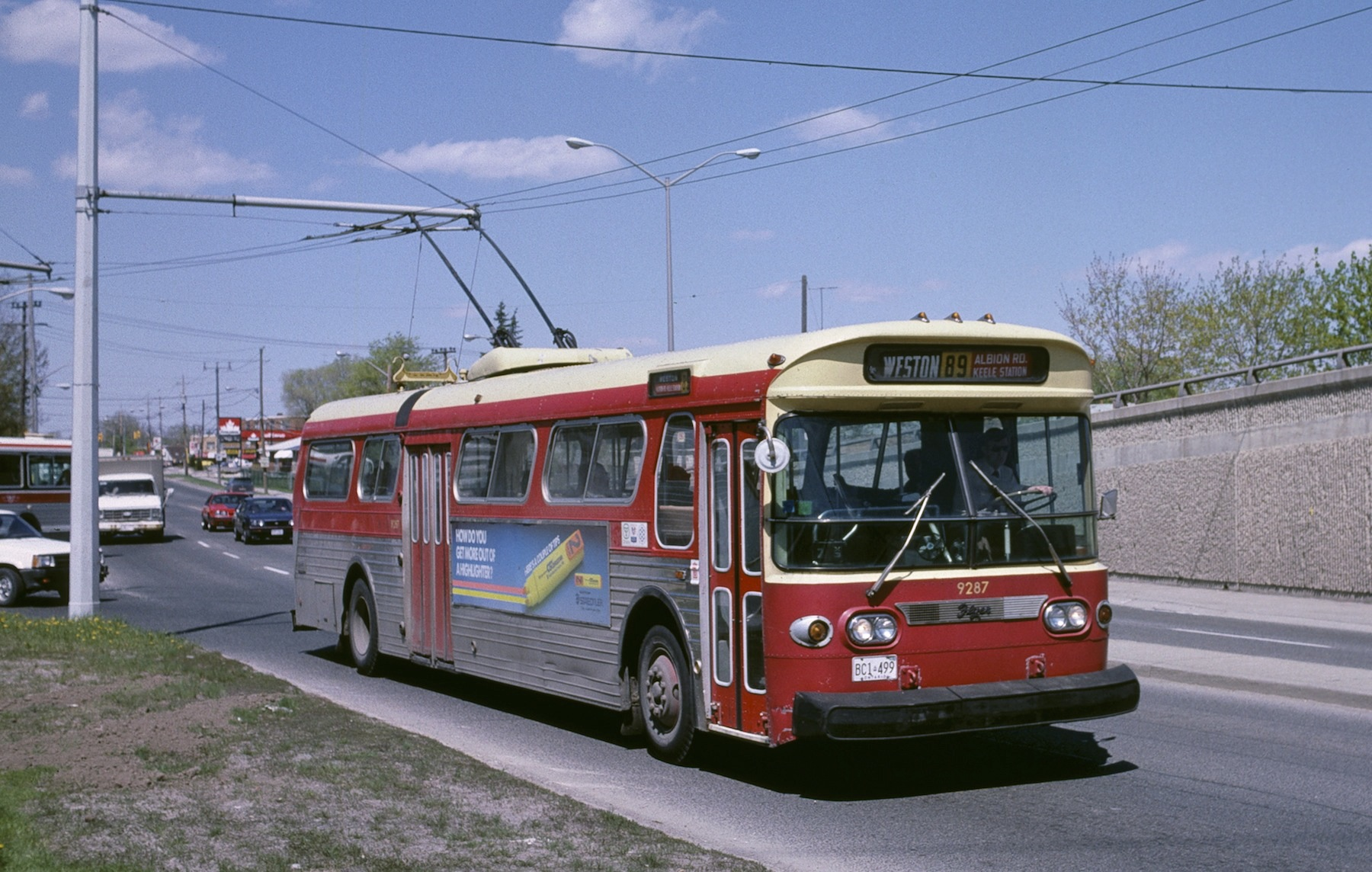
New Flyer trolleybus in Toronto, Canada

A bus (contracted from omnibus, with variants multibus, motorbus, autobus, etc.) is a motor vehicle that carries significantly more passengers than an average car or van, but fewer than the average rail transport. It is most commonly used in public transport, but is also in use for charter purposes, or through private ownership. Although buses typically carry between 30 and 100 passengers, some buses have a capacity of up to 300 passengers. The most common type is the single-deck rigid bus, with double-decker and articulated buses carrying larger loads, and midibuses and minibuses carrying smaller loads. Coaches are used for longer-distance services. Many types of buses, such as city transit buses and inter-city coaches, charge a fare. Other types, such as elementary or secondary school buses or shuttle buses within a post-secondary education campus, are free. In many jurisdictions, bus drivers require a special large vehicle licence above and beyond a regular driving license.

Buses may be used for scheduled bus transport, scheduled coach transport, school transport, private hire, or tourism; promotional buses may be used for political campaigns and others are privately operated for a wide range of purposes, including rock and pop band tour vehicles.

Horse-drawn omnibuses were used from the 1820s, followed by steam buses in the 1830s, and electric trolleybuses in 1882. The first internal combustion engine buses, or motor buses, were used in 1895. Recently, interest has been growing in hybrid electric buses, fuel cell buses, and electric buses, as well as buses powered by compressed natural gas or biodiesel. As of the 2010s, bus manufacturing is increasingly globalised, with the same designs appearing around the world.

== Name ==
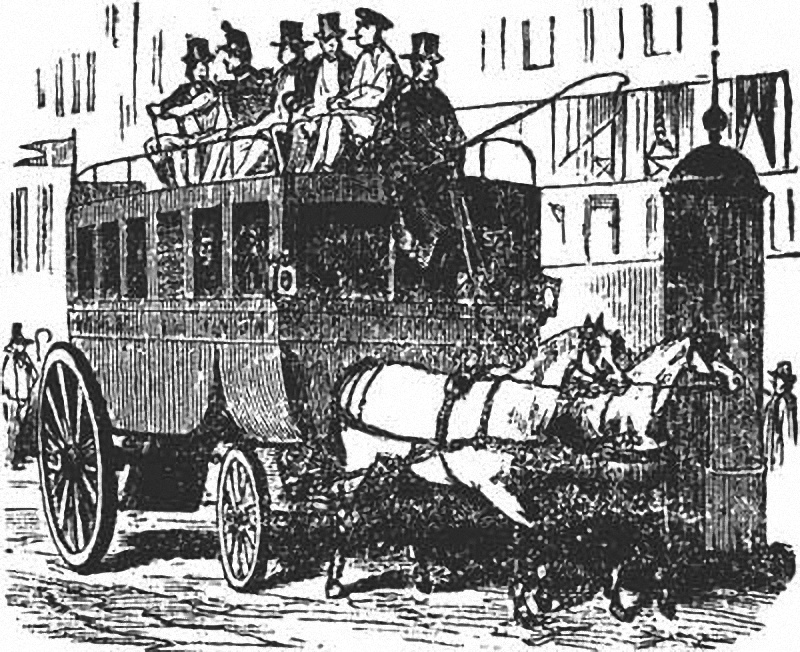
An early horse-drawn omnibus from mid-nineteenth century

The word bus is a shortened form of the Latin adjectival form omnibus ('for all'), the dative plural of omnis/omne ("all"). The theoretical full name is in French voiture omnibus ('vehicle for all'). The name originates from a mass-transport service started in 1823 by a French corn-mill owner named Stanislas Baudry in Richebourg, a suburb of Nantes. A by-product of his mill was hot water, and thus next to it he established a spa business. In order to encourage customers he started a horse-drawn transport service from the city centre of Nantes to his establishment. The first vehicles stopped in front of the shop of a hatter named Omnés, which displayed a large sign inscribed "Omnes Omnibus", a pun on his Latin-sounding surname, omnes being the masculine and feminine nominative, vocative and accusative plural form of the Latin adjective omnis/-e ('all'), combined with omnibus, the dative plural form meaning 'for all', thus giving his shop the name "Omnés for all", or "everything for everyone".

His transport scheme was a huge success, although not as he had intended, as most of his passengers did not visit his spa. He turned the transport service into his principal lucrative business venture and closed the mill and spa. Nantes citizens soon gave the nickname omnibus to the vehicle. Having invented the successful concept, Baudry moved to Paris and launched the first omnibus service there in April 1828. A similar service was introduced in Manchester in 1824 and in London in 1829.

== History ==
Before the development of powered vehicles, urban public transport used horse-drawn omnibuses.

=== Steam buses ===
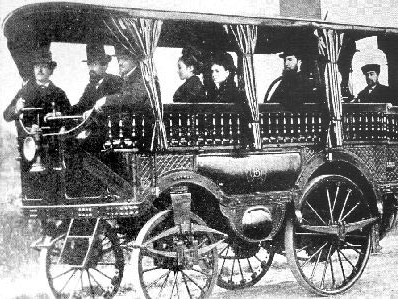
Amédée Bollée's L'Obéissante (1875)

Regular intercity bus services by steam-powered buses were pioneered in England in the 1830s by Walter Hancock and by associates of Sir Goldsworthy Gurney, among others, running reliable services over road conditions which were too hazardous for horse-drawn transportation.

The first mechanically propelled omnibus appeared on the streets of London on 22 April 1833. Steam carriages were much less likely to overturn, they travelled faster than horse-drawn carriages, they were much cheaper to run, and caused much less damage to the road surface due to their wide tyres.

However, the heavy road tolls imposed by the turnpike trusts discouraged steam road vehicles and left the way clear for the horse-drawn omnibus companies, and from 1861 onwards, harsh legislation virtually eliminated mechanically propelled vehicles from the roads of Great Britain for 30 years, the Locomotive Act 1861 imposing restrictive speed limits on "road locomotives" of 5 mph (8 km/h) in towns and cities, and 10 mph (16 km/h) in the country.

=== Trolleybuses ===
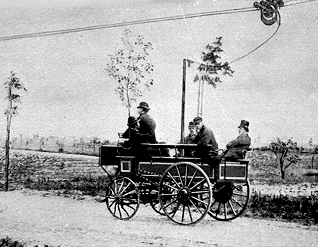
World's first trolleybus, Berlin 1882

In parallel to the development of the bus was the invention of the electric trolleybus, typically fed through trolley poles by overhead wires. The Siemens brothers, William in England and Ernst Werner in Germany, collaborated on the development of the trolleybus concept. Sir William first proposed the idea in an article to the Journal of the Society of Arts in 1881 as an "...arrangement by which an ordinary omnibus...would have a suspender thrown at intervals from one side of the street to the other, and two wires hanging from these suspenders; allowing contact rollers to run on these two wires, the current could be conveyed to the tram-car, and back again to the dynamo machine at the station, without the necessity of running upon rails at all."

The first such vehicle, the Electromote, was made by his brother Ernst Werner von Siemens and presented to the public in 1882 in Halensee, Germany. Although this experimental vehicle fulfilled all the technical criteria of a typical trolleybus, it was dismantled in the same year after the demonstration.

Max Schiemann opened a passenger-carrying trolleybus in 1901 near Dresden, in Germany. Although this system operated only until 1904, Schiemann had developed what is now the standard trolleybus current collection system. In the early days, a few other methods of current collection were used. Leeds and Bradford became the first cities to put trolleybuses into service in Great Britain on 20 June 1911.

=== Motor buses ===
In Siegerland, Germany, two passenger bus lines ran briefly, but unprofitably, in 1895 using a six-passenger motor carriage developed from the 1893 Benz Viktoria. Another commercial bus line using the same model Benz omnibuses ran for a short time in 1898 in the rural area around Llandudno, Wales.

Germany's Daimler Motors Corporation also produced one of the earliest motor-bus models in 1898, selling a double-decker bus to the Motor Traction Company which was first used on the streets of London on 23 April 1898. The vehicle had a maximum speed of 18 km/h (11.2 mph) and accommodated up to 20 passengers, in an enclosed area below and on an open-air platform above. With the success and popularity of this bus, DMG expanded production, selling more buses to companies in London and, in 1899, to Stockholm and Speyer. Daimler Motors Corporation also entered into a partnership with the British company Milnes and developed a new double-decker in 1902 that became the market standard.

The first mass-produced bus model was the B-type double-decker bus, designed by Frank Searle and operated by the London General Omnibus Company—it entered service in 1910, and almost 3,000 had been built by the end of the decade. Hundreds of them saw military service on the Western Front during the First World War.

The Yellow Coach Manufacturing Company, which rapidly became a major manufacturer of buses in the US, was founded in Chicago in 1923 by John D. Hertz. General Motors purchased a majority stake in 1925 and changed its name to the Yellow Truck and Coach Manufacturing Company. GM purchased the balance of the shares in 1943 to form the GM Truck and Coach Division.

Models expanded in the 20th century, leading to the widespread introduction of the contemporary recognizable form of full-sized buses from the 1950s. The AEC Routemaster, developed in the 1950s, was a pioneering design and remains an icon of London to this day. The innovative design used lightweight aluminium and techniques developed in aircraft production during World War II. As well as a novel weight-saving integral design, it also introduced for the first time on a bus independent front suspension, power steering, a fully automatic gearbox, and power-hydraulic braking.

==== Gallery ====
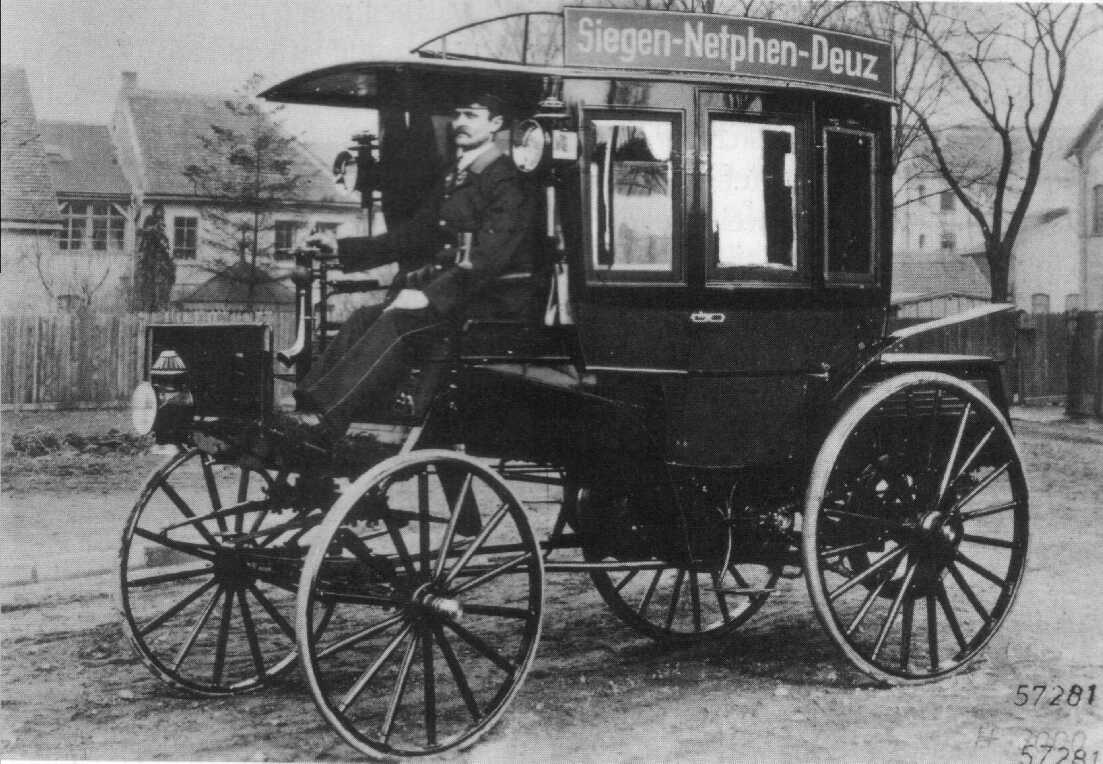
The first ever internal combustion omnibus, introduced in 1895 (Siegen to Netphen)

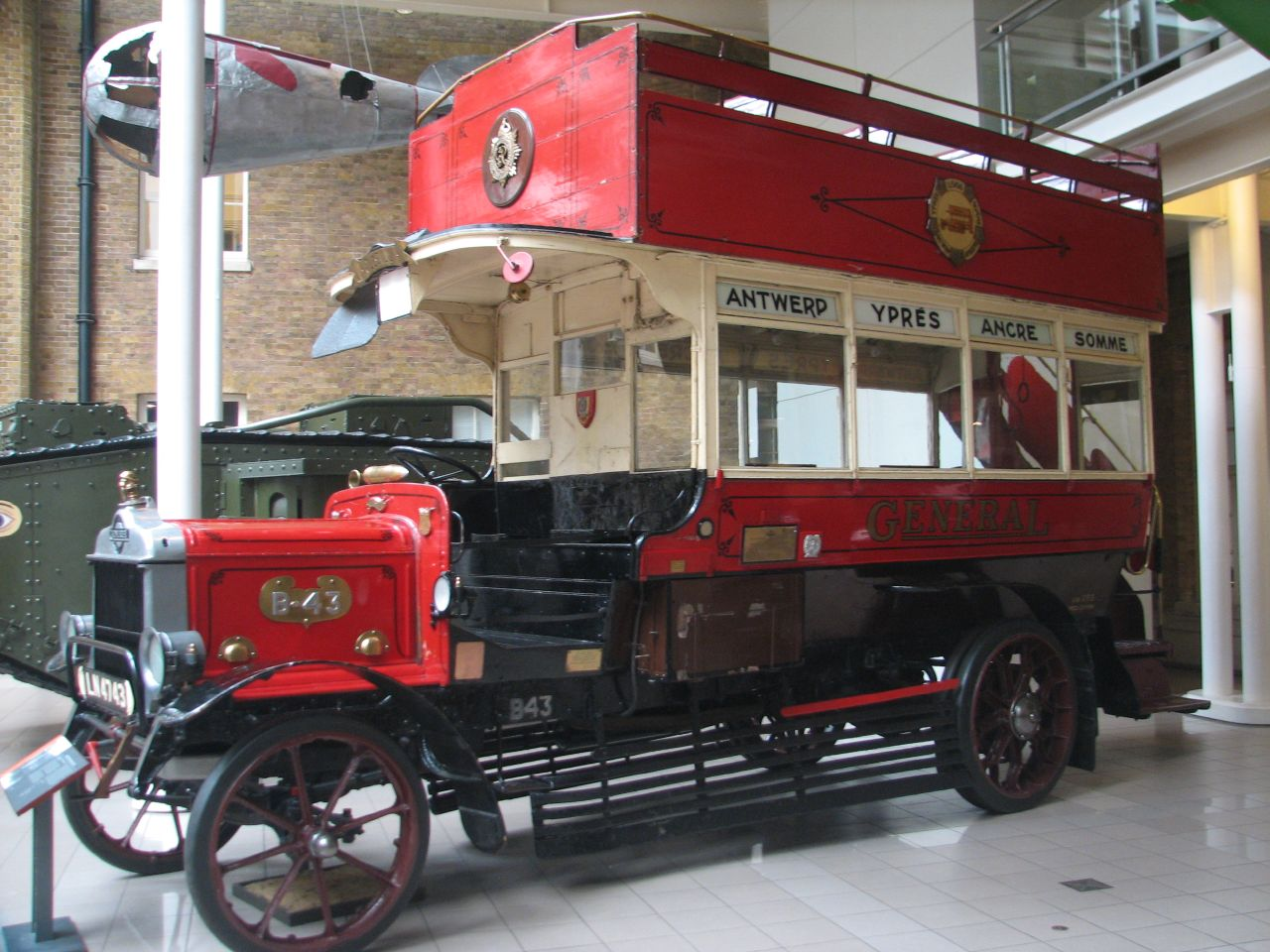
A 1911 LGOC B-type

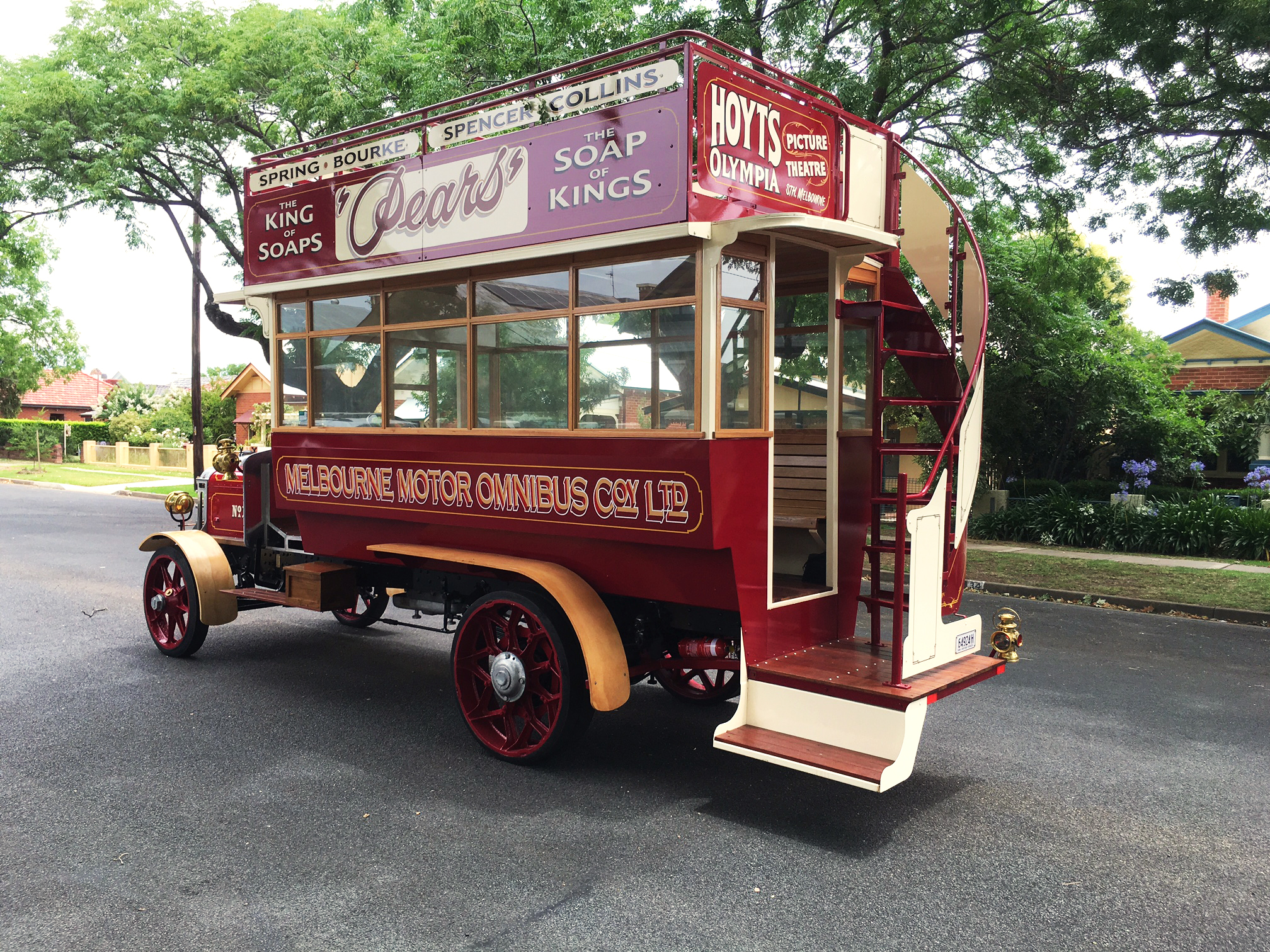
A 1912 Daimler CC Bus, one of five (English) Daimler Company buses exported to Australia

== Types ==
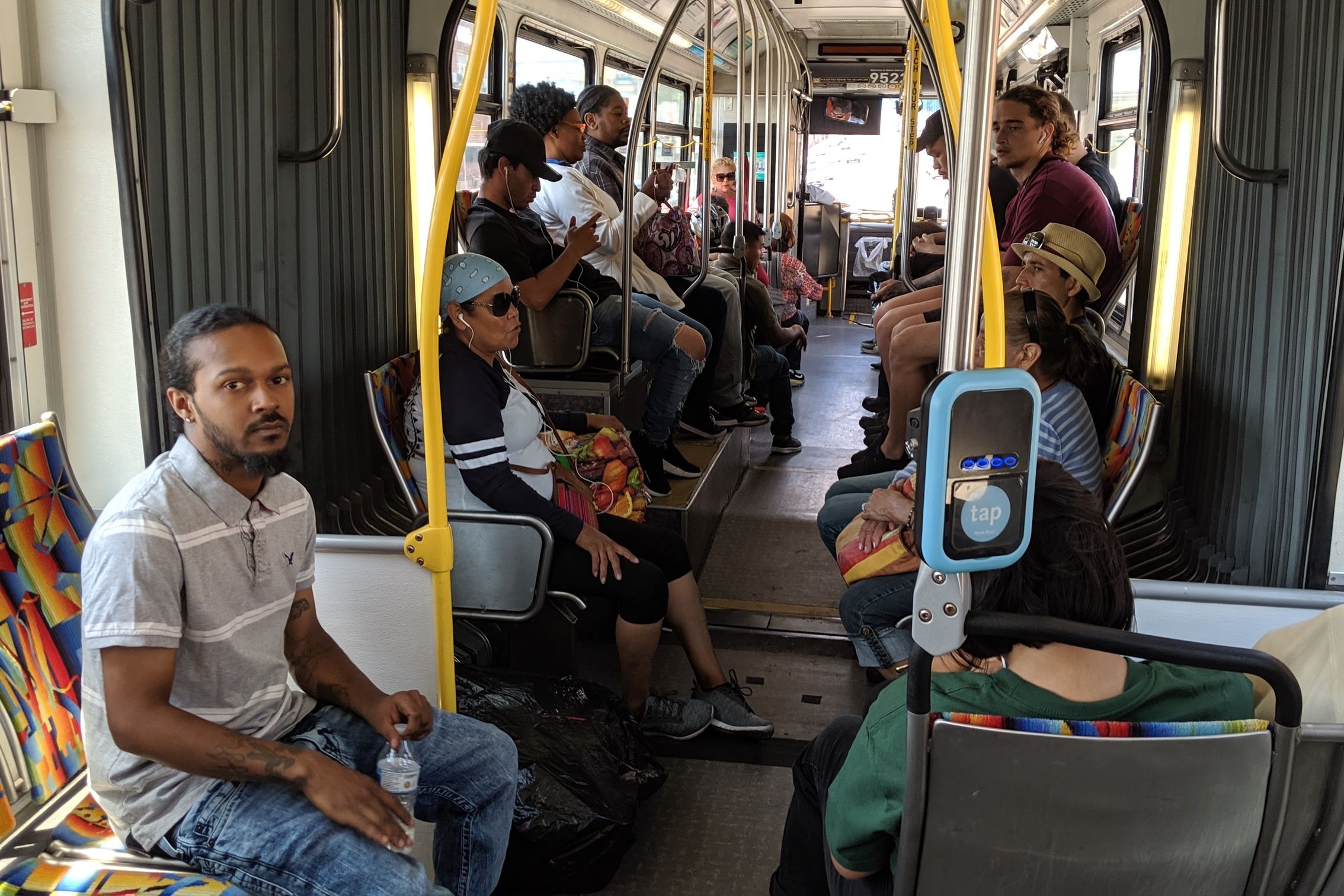
Interior of an articulated bus in Los Angeles

Formats include single-decker bus, double-decker bus (both usually with a rigid chassis) and articulated bus (or 'bendy-bus') the prevalence of which varies from country to country. High-capacity bi-articulated buses are also manufactured, and passenger-carrying trailers—either towed behind a rigid bus (a bus trailer) or hauled as a trailer by a truck (a trailer bus). Smaller midibuses have a lower capacity and open-top buses are typically used for leisure purposes. In many new fleets, particularly in local transit systems, a shift to low-floor buses is occurring, primarily for easier accessibility. Coaches are designed for longer-distance travel and are typically fitted with individual high-backed reclining seats, seat belts, toilets, and audio-visual entertainment systems, and can operate at higher speeds with more capacity for luggage. Coaches may be single- or double-deckers, articulated, and often include a separate luggage compartment under the passenger floor. Guided buses are fitted with technology to allow them to run in designated guideways, allowing the controlled alignment at bus stops and less space taken up by guided lanes than conventional roads or bus lanes.

Bus manufacturing may be by a single company (an integral manufacturer), or by one manufacturer's building a bus body over a chassis produced by another manufacturer.

== Design ==
=== Accessibility ===
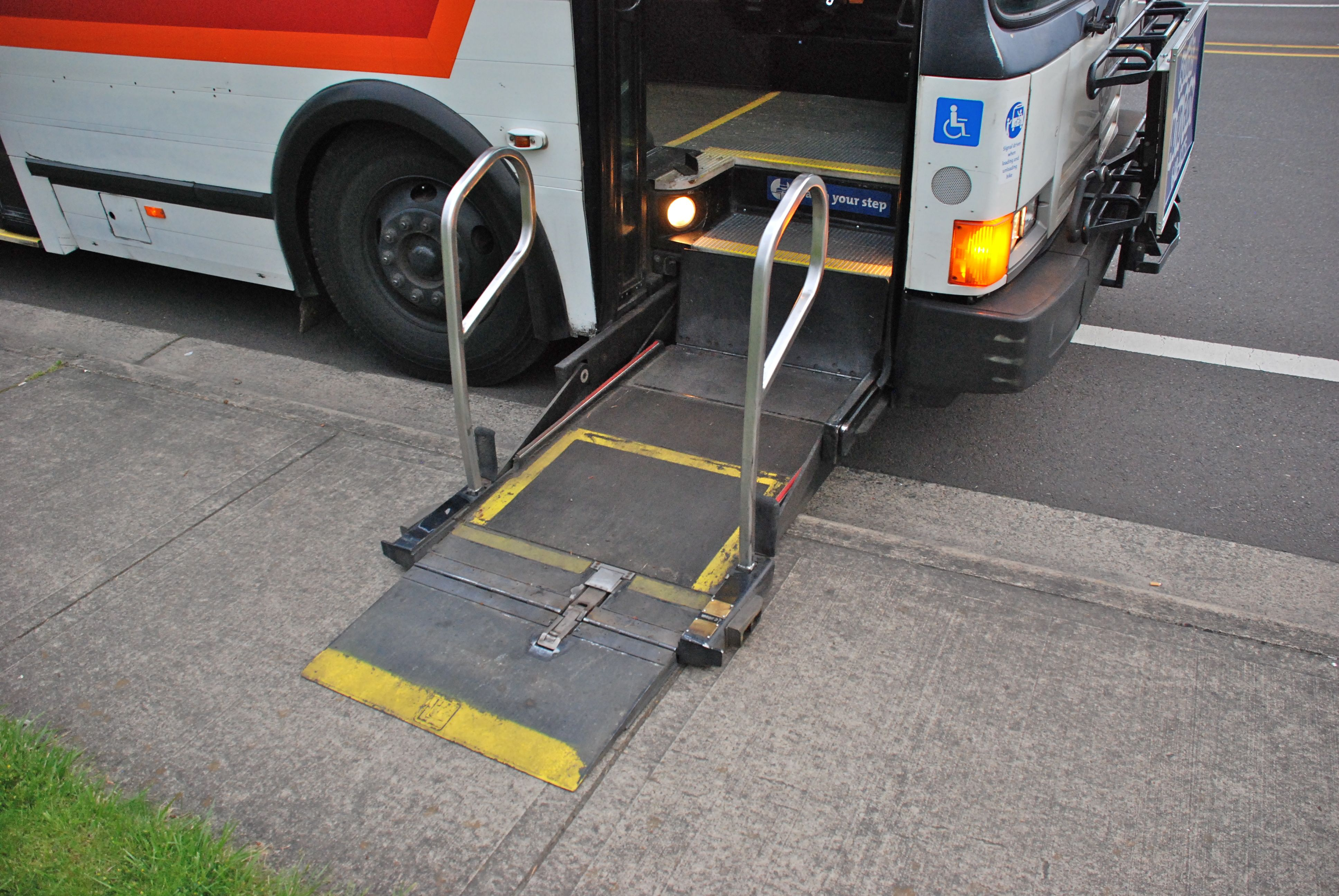
Portland, Oregon TriMet high-floor bus with wheelchair lift extended and lowered to the sidewalk/pavement (2010)

During most of the 20th century, transit buses were almost exclusively high-floor vehicles, and they used wheelchair lifts if they provided accessibility at all. (Note: In the U.S., only in 1993 did accessibility become a requirement in all new buses, under the federal Americans with Disabilities Act of 1990.) However, there are now increasingly of low-floor design and optionally also 'kneel' air suspension and have ramps to provide access for wheelchair users and people with baby carriages, sometimes as electrically or hydraulically extended under-floor constructs for level access. Prior to more general use of such technology, these wheelchair users could only use specialist para-transit mobility buses.

Accessible vehicles also have wider entrances and interior gangways and space for wheelchairs. Interior fittings and destination displays may also be designed to be usable by the visually impaired. Coaches generally still use wheelchair lifts instead of low-floor designs. In some countries, vehicles are required to have these features by disability discrimination laws.

=== Configuration ===
Buses were initially configured with an engine in the front and an entrance at the rear. With the transition to one-person operation, many manufacturers moved to mid- or rear-engined designs, with a single door at the front or multiple doors. The move to the low-floor design has all but eliminated the mid-engined design, although some coaches still have mid-mounted engines. Front-engined buses still persist for niche markets such as American school buses, some minibuses, and buses in less developed countries, which may be derived from truck chassis, rather than purpose-built bus designs. Most buses have two axles, while articulated buses have three.

=== Guidance ===
Guided buses are fitted with technology to allow them to run in designated guideways, allowing the controlled alignment at bus stops and less space taken up by guided lanes than conventional roads or bus lanes. Guidance can be mechanical, optical, or electromagnetic. Extensions of the guided technology include the Guided Light Transit and Translohr systems, although these are more often termed 'rubber-tyred trams' as they have limited or no mobility away from their guideways.

=== Liveries ===
Transit buses are normally painted to identify the operator or a route, function, or to demarcate low-cost or premium service buses. Liveries may be painted onto the vehicle, applied using adhesive vinyl technologies, or using decals. Vehicles often also carry bus advertising or part or all of their visible surfaces (as mobile billboard). Campaign buses may be decorated with key campaign messages; these can be to promote an event or initiative.

=== Propulsion ===
The most common power source since the 1920s has been the diesel engine. Early buses, known as trolleybuses, were powered by electricity supplied from overhead lines. Nowadays, electric buses often carry their own battery, which is sometimes recharged on stops/stations to keep the size of the battery small/lightweight. Currently, interest exists in hybrid electric buses, fuel cell buses, electric buses, and ones powered by compressed natural gas or biodiesel. Gyrobuses, which are powered by the momentum stored by a flywheel, were tried in the 1940s.

=== Dimensions ===
United Kingdom and European Union:

Maximum Length: Single rear axle 13.5 meters (44 ft 3 1/2 in). Twin rear axle 15 meters (49 ft 2 1/2 in).
Maximum Width: 2.55 meters (8 ft 4 3/8 in)

United States, Canada and Mexico:

Maximum Length: None
Maximum Width: 2.6 meters (8 ft 6 3/8 in)

== Manufacture ==
Early bus manufacturing grew out of carriage coach building, and later out of automobile or truck manufacturers. Early buses were merely a bus body fitted to a truck chassis. This body+chassis approach has continued with modern specialist manufacturers, although there also exist integral designs such as the Leyland National where the two are practically inseparable. Specialist builders also exist and concentrate on building buses for special uses or modifying standard buses into specialised products.

Integral designs have the advantages that they have been well-tested for strength and stability, and also are off-the-shelf. However, two incentives cause use of the chassis+body model. First, it allows the buyer and manufacturer both to shop for the best deal for their needs, rather than having to settle on one fixed design—the buyer can choose the body and the chassis separately. Second, over the lifetime of a vehicle (in constant service and heavy traffic), it will likely get minor damage now and again, and being able easily to replace a body panel or window etc. can vastly increase its service life and save the cost and inconvenience of removing it from service.

As with the rest of the automotive industry, into the 20th century, bus manufacturing increasingly became globalized, with manufacturers producing buses far from their intended market to exploit labour and material cost advantages. A typical city bus costs almost US$450,000.

== Uses ==
=== Public transport ===
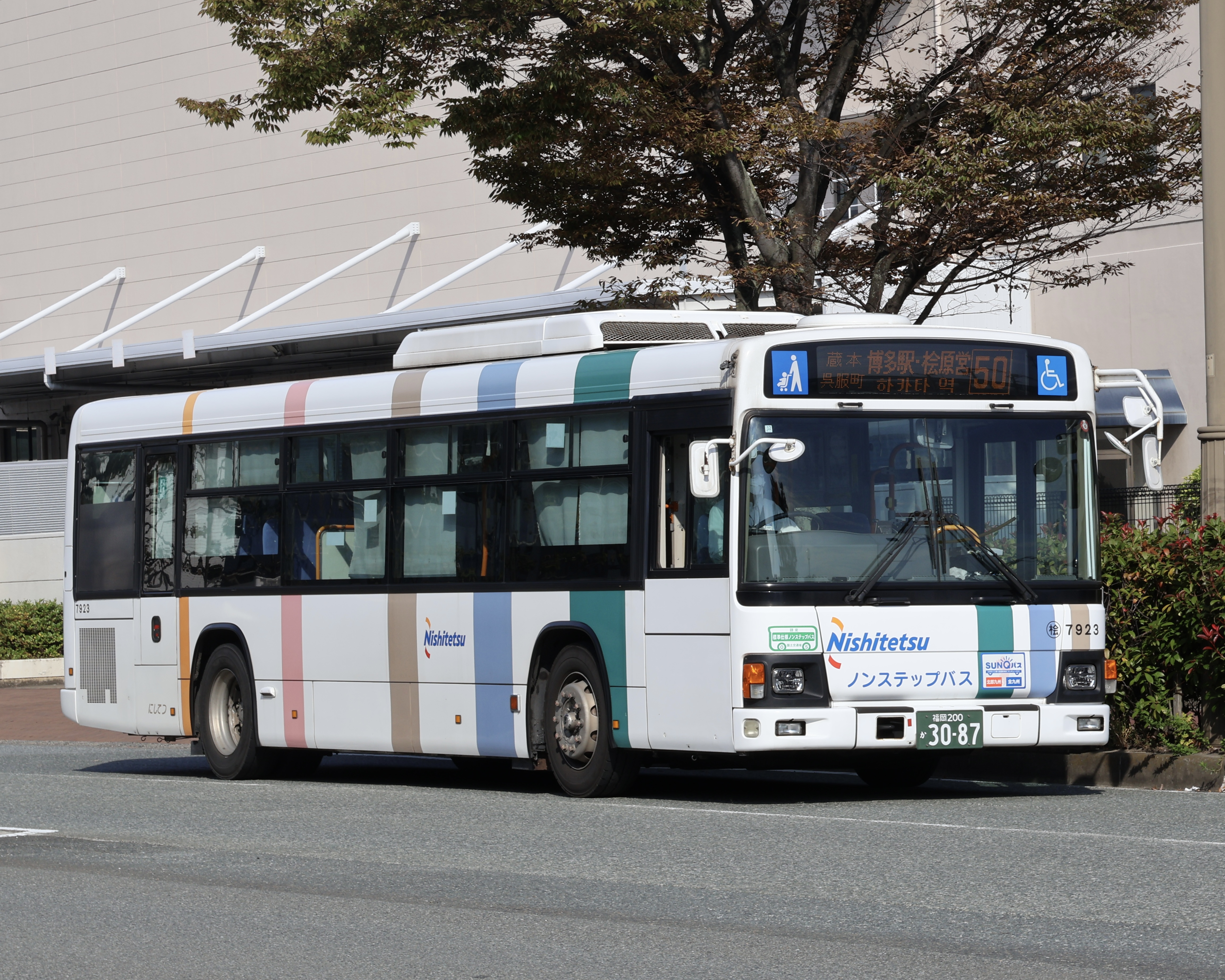
A Nishitetsu public bus in Fukuoka, Japan

Transit buses, used on public transport bus services, have utilitarian fittings designed for efficient movement of large numbers of people, and often have multiple doors. Coaches are used for longer-distance routes. High-capacity bus rapid transit services may use the bi-articulated bus or tram-style buses such as the Wright StreetCar and the Irisbus Civis.

Buses and coach services often operate to a predetermined published public transport timetable defining the route and the timing, but smaller vehicles may be used on more flexible demand responsive transport services.

=== Tourism ===
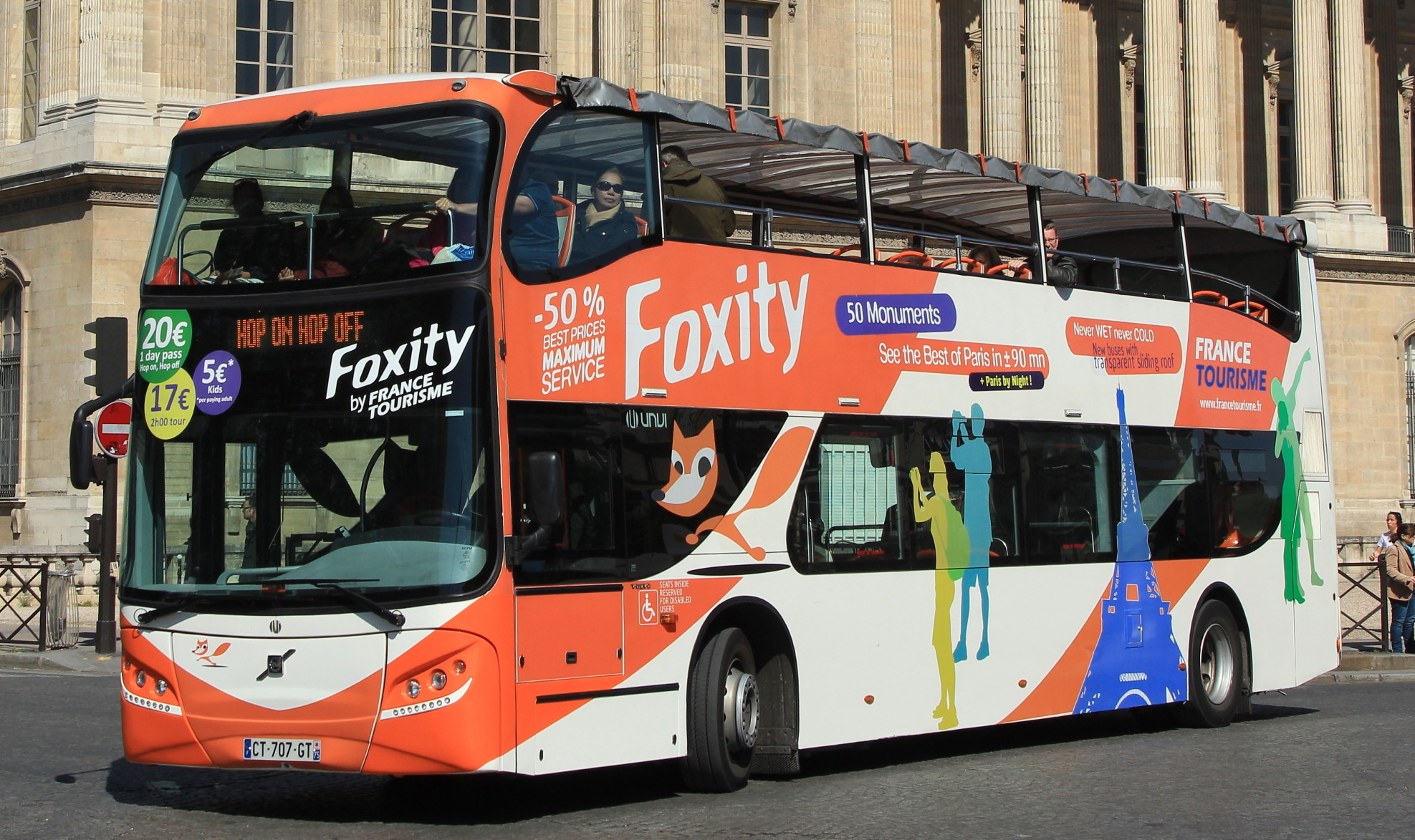
Tour bus being used in France (2015)

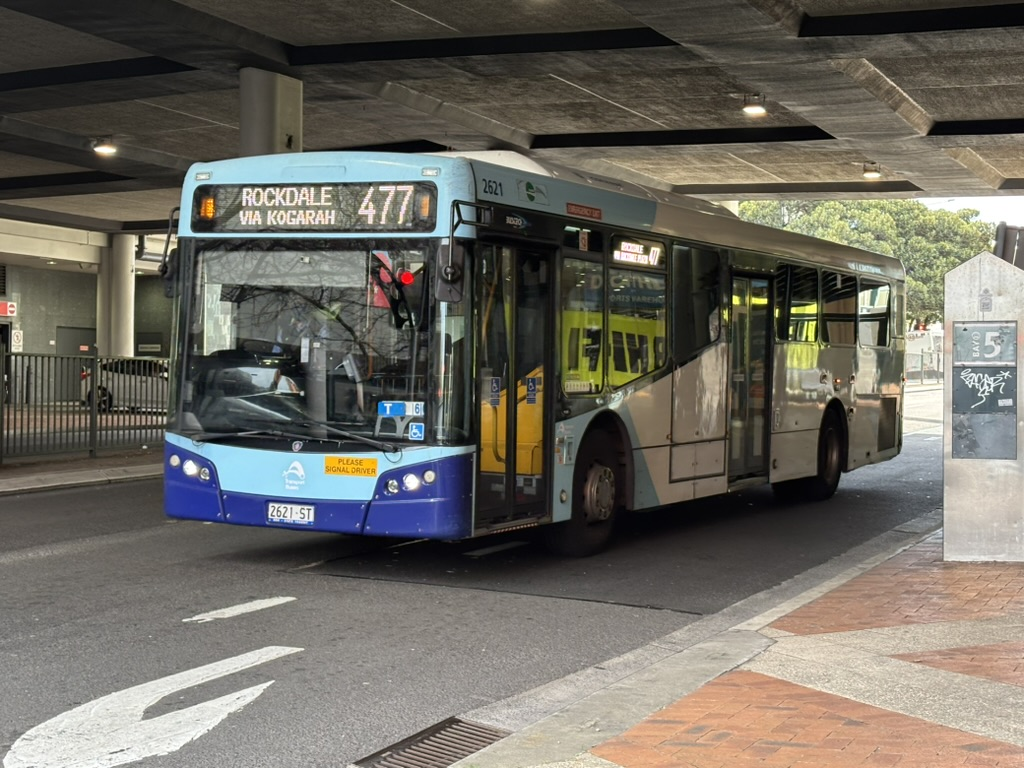
A Transit Systems Scania K280UB at Westfield Miranda

Buses play a major part in the tourism industry. Tour buses around the world allow tourists to view local attractions or scenery. These are often open-top buses, but can also be regular buses or coaches.

In local sightseeing, City Sightseeing is the largest operator of local tour buses, operating on a franchised basis all over the world. Specialist tour buses are also often owned and operated by safari parks and other theme parks or resorts. Longer-distance tours are also carried out by bus, either on a turn up and go basis or through a tour operator, and usually allow disembarkation from the bus to allow touring of sites of interest on foot. These may be day trips or longer excursions incorporating hotel stays. Tour buses often carry a tour guide, although the driver or a recorded audio commentary may also perform this function. The tour operator may be a subsidiary of a company that operates buses and coaches for other uses or an independent company that charters buses or coaches. Commuter transport operators may also use their coaches to conduct tours within the target city between the morning and evening commuter transport journey.

Buses and coaches are also a common component of the wider package holiday industry, providing private airport transfers (in addition to general airport buses) and organised tours and day trips for holidaymakers on the package.

Tour buses can also be hired as chartered buses by groups for sightseeing at popular holiday destinations. These private tour buses may offer specific stops, such as all the historical sights, or allow the customers to choose their own itineraries. Tour buses come with professional and informed staff and insurance, and maintain state governed safety standards. Some provide other facilities like entertainment units, luxurious reclining seats, large scenic windows, and even lavatories.

Public long-distance coach networks are also often used as a low-cost method of travel by students or young people travelling the world. Some companies such as Topdeck Travel were set up specifically to use buses to drive the hippie trail or travel to places such as North Africa.

In many tourist or travel destinations, a bus is part of the tourist attraction, such as the North American tourist trolleys, London's AEC Routemaster heritage routes, or the customised buses of Malta, Asia, and the Americas. Another example of tourist stops is the homes of celebrities, such as tours based near Hollywood. There are several such services between 6000 and 7000 Hollywood Boulevard in Los Angeles.

=== Student transport ===
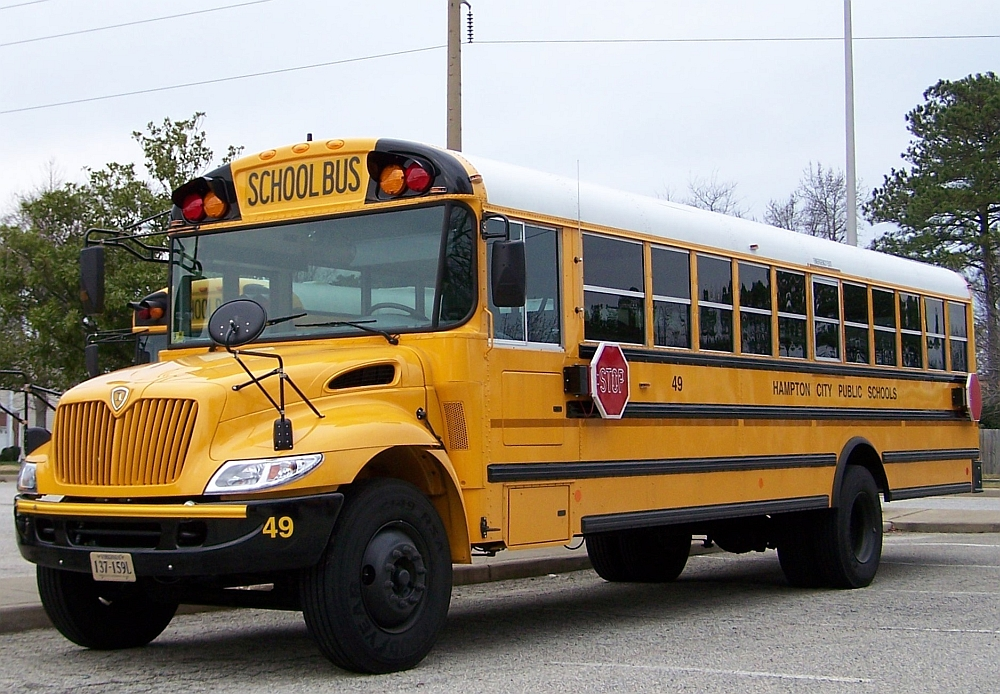
US school bus (2007 IC CE)

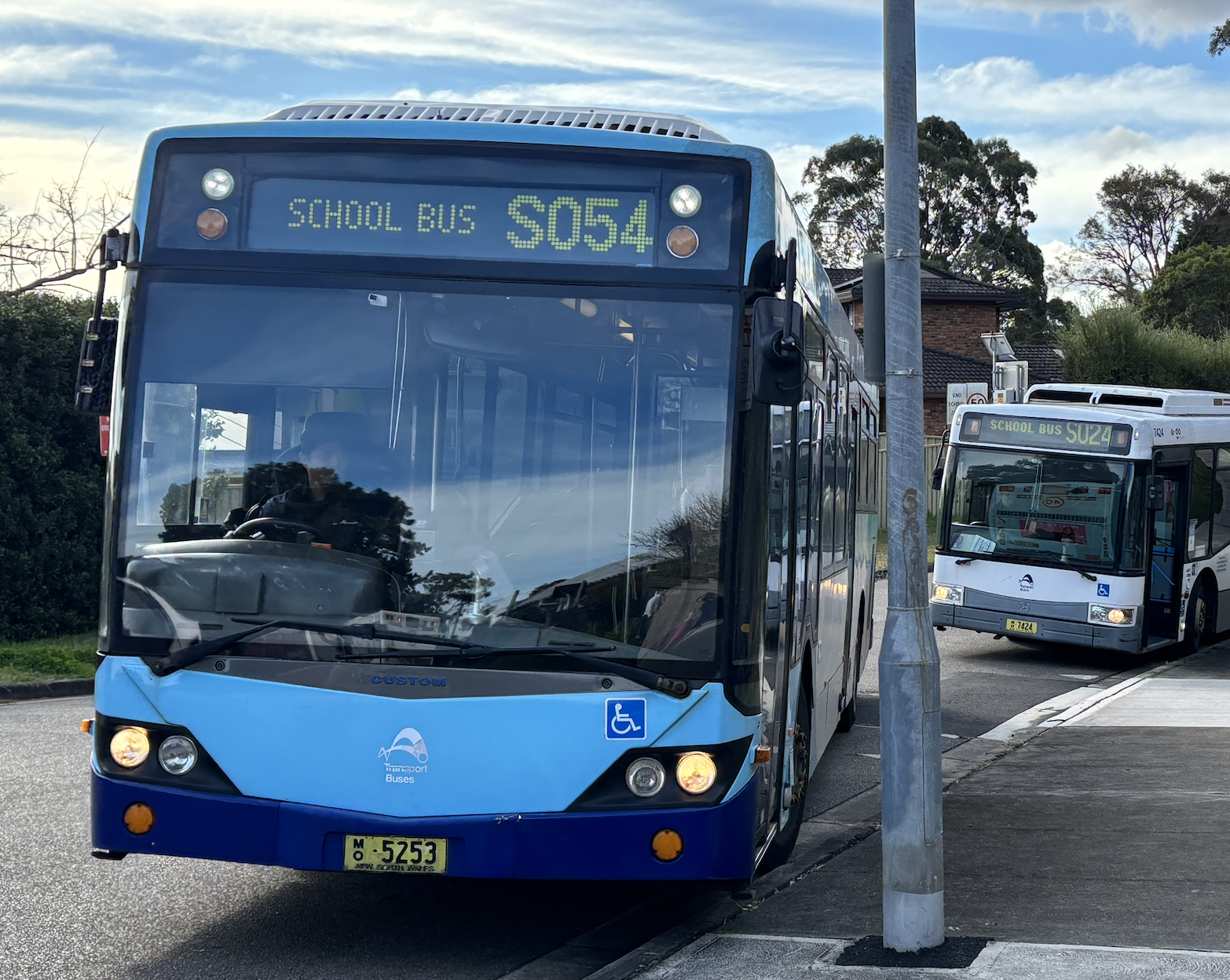
School buses operated by U-go Mobility in Sydney, NSW

In some countries, particularly the US and Canada, buses used to transport schoolchildren have evolved into a specific design with specified mandatory features. American states have also adopted laws regarding motorist conduct around school buses, including large fines and possibly prison for passing a stopped school bus in the process of loading or offloading children passengers. These school buses may have school bus yellow livery and crossing guards. Other countries may mandate the use of seat belts. As a minimum, many countries require a bus carrying students to display a sign, and may also adopt yellow liveries. Student transport often uses older buses cascaded from service use, retrofitted with more seats or seatbelts. Student transport may be operated by local authorities or private contractors.

Schools may also own and operate their own buses for other transport needs, such as class field trips or transport to associated sports, music, or other school events.

=== Private charter ===
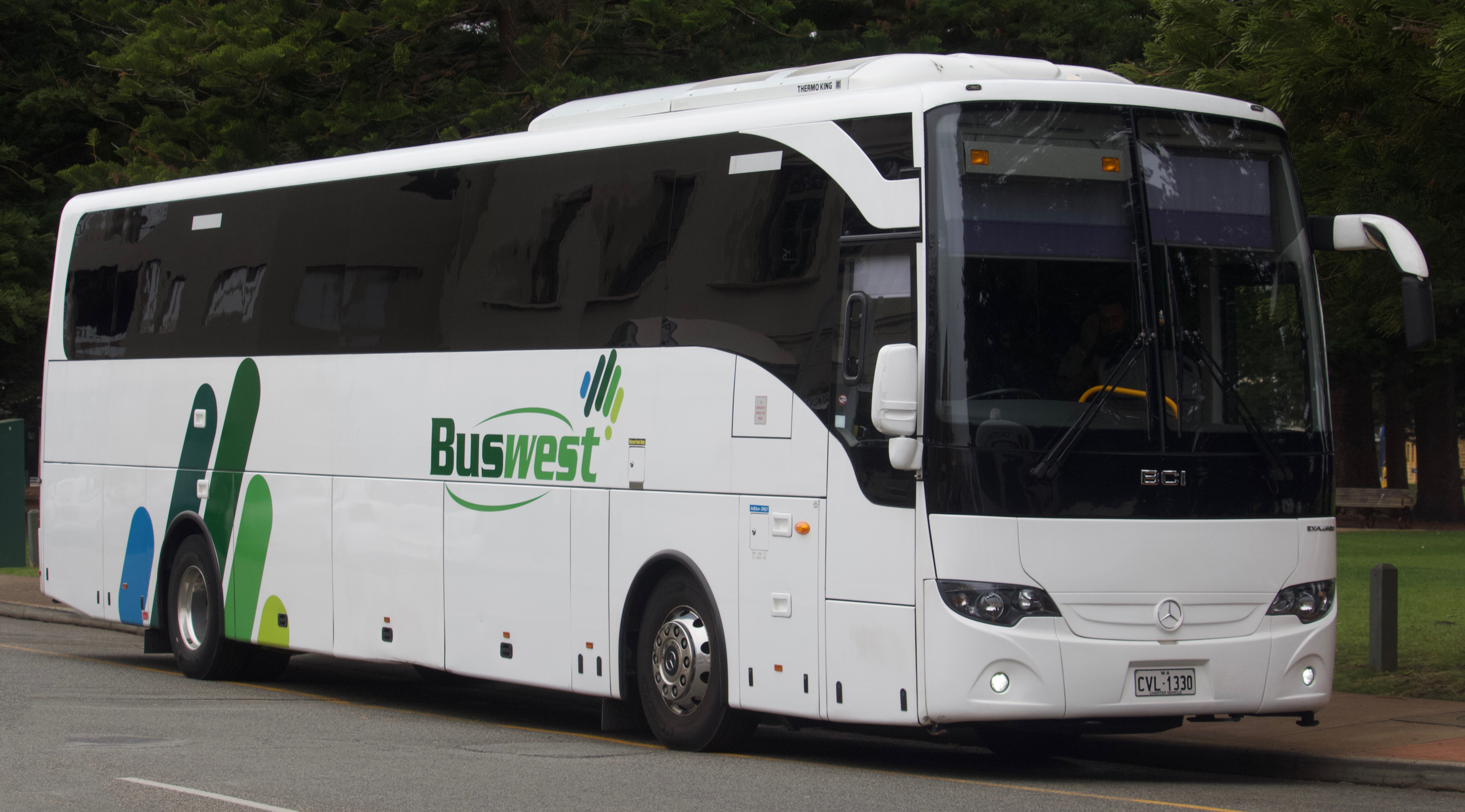
An example of a private bus operating for BusWest in Perth (2018)

Due to the costs involved in owning, operating, and driving buses and coaches, much bus and coach use comes from the private hire of vehicles from charter bus companies, either for a day or two or on a longer contract basis, where the charter company provides the vehicles and qualified drivers.

Charter bus operators may be completely independent businesses, or charter hire may be a subsidiary business of a public transport operator that might maintain a separate fleet or use surplus buses, coaches, and dual-purpose coach-seated buses. Many private taxicab companies also operate larger minibus vehicles to cater for group fares. Companies, private groups, and social clubs may hire buses or coaches as a cost-effective method of transporting a group to an event or site, such as a group meeting, racing event, or organised recreational activity such as a summer camp. Schools often hire charter bus services on a regular basis for transportation of children to and from their homes. Chartered buses are also used by education institutes for transport to conventions, exhibitions, and field trips. Entertainment or event companies may also hire temporary shuttles buses for transport at events such as festivals or conferences. Party buses are used by companies in a similar manner to limousine hire, for luxury private transport to social events or as a touring experience. Sleeper buses are used by bands or other organisations that tour between entertainment venues and require mobile rest and recreation facilities. Some couples hire preserved buses for their wedding transport, instead of the traditional car. Buses are often hired for parades or processions. Victory parades are often held for triumphant sports teams, who often tour their home town or city in an open-top bus. Sports teams may also contract out their transport to a team bus, for travel to away games, to a competition or to a final event. These buses are often specially decorated in a livery matching the team colours. Private companies often contract out private shuttle bus services, for transport of their customers or patrons, such as hotels, amusement parks, university campuses, or private airport transfer services. This shuttle usage can be as transport between locations, or to and from parking lots. High specification luxury coaches are often chartered by companies for executive or VIP transport. Charter buses may also be used in tourism and for promotion (See Tourism and Promotion sections).

=== Private ownership ===
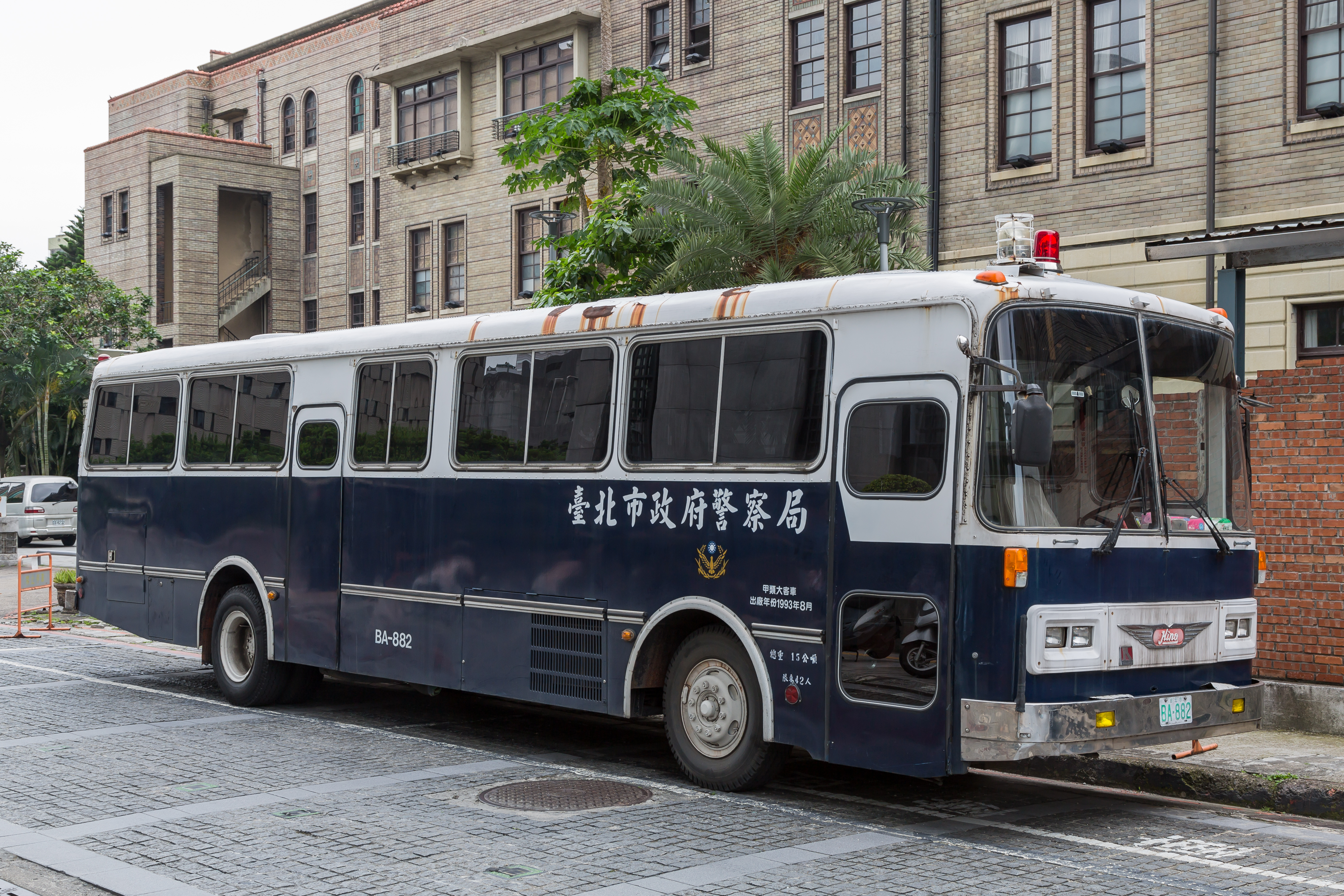
Police bus in Taipei, Taiwan (2014)

Many organisations, including the police, not for profit, social or charitable groups with a regular need for group transport may find it practical or cost-effective to own and operate a bus for their own needs. These are often minibuses for practical, tax and driver licensing reasons, although they can also be full-size buses. Cadet or scout groups or other youth organizations may also own buses. Companies such as railroads, construction contractors, and agricultural firms may own buses to transport employees to and from remote job sites. Specific charities may exist to fund and operate bus transport, usually using specially modified mobility buses or otherwise accessible buses (See Accessibility section). Some use their contributions to buy vehicles and provide volunteer drivers.

Airport operators make use of special airside airport buses for crew and passenger transport in the secure airside parts of an airport. Some public authorities, police forces, and military forces make use of armoured buses where there is a special need to provide increased passenger protection. The United States Secret Service acquired two in 2010 for transporting dignitaries needing special protection. Police departments make use of police buses for a variety of reasons, such as prisoner transport, officer transport, temporary detention facilities, and as command and control vehicles. Some fire departments also use a converted bus as a command post while those in cold climates might retain a bus as a heated shelter at fire scenes. Many are drawn from retired school or service buses.

=== Promotion ===
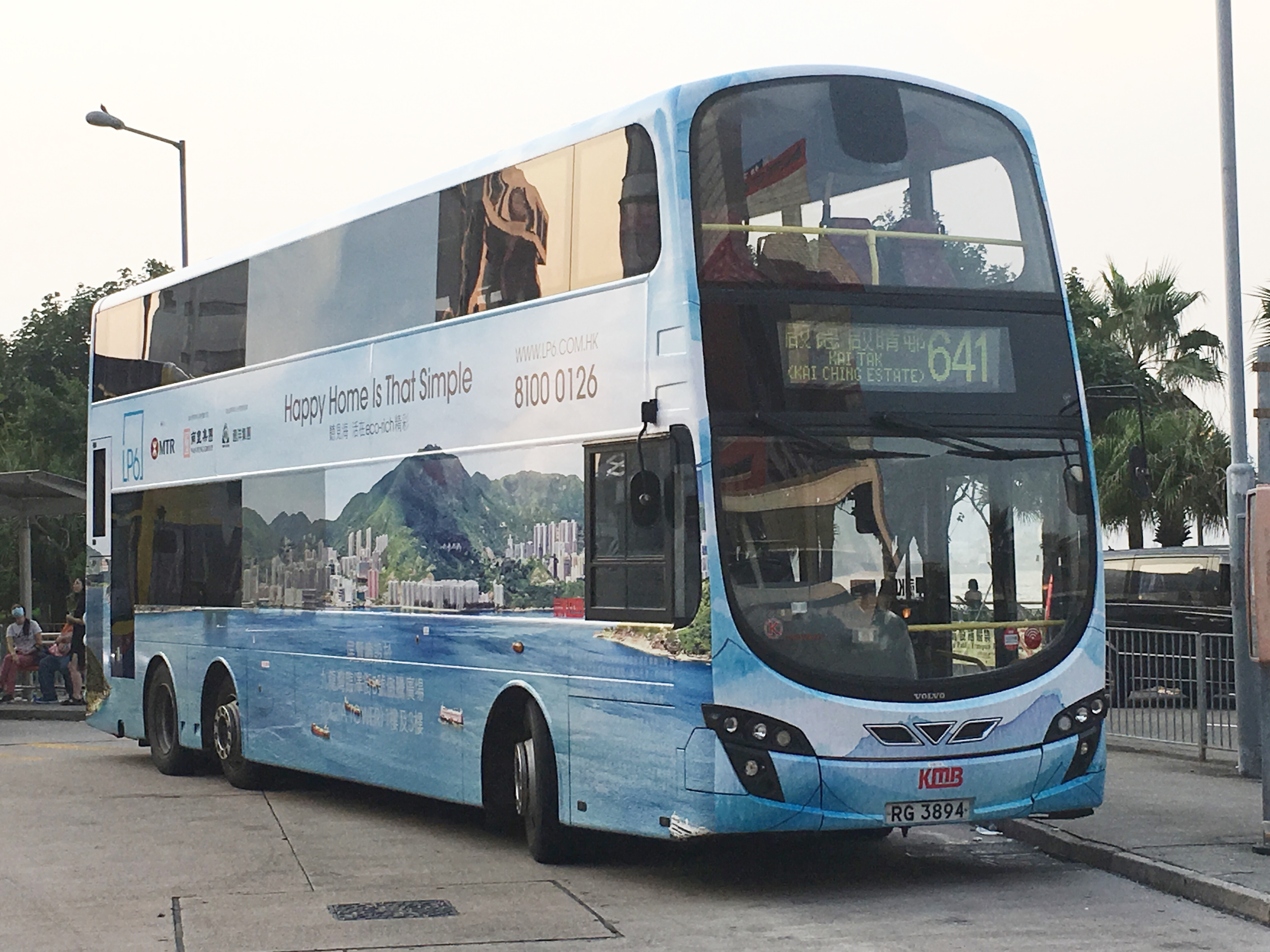
Advertisement on a bus in Hong Kong (2018)

Buses are often used for advertising, political campaigning, public information campaigns, public relations, or promotional purposes. These may take the form of temporary charter hire of service buses, or the temporary or permanent conversion and operation of buses, usually of second-hand buses. Extreme examples include converting the bus with displays and decorations or awnings and fittings. Interiors may be fitted out for exhibition or information purposes with special equipment or audio visual devices.

Bus advertising takes many forms, often as interior and exterior adverts and all-over advertising liveries. The practice often extends into the exclusive private hire and use of a bus to promote a brand or product, appearing at large public events, or touring busy streets. The bus is sometimes staffed by promotions personnel, giving out free gifts. Campaign buses are often specially decorated for a political campaign or other social awareness information campaign, designed to bring a specific message to different areas, or used to transport campaign personnel to local areas/meetings. Exhibition buses are often sent to public events such as fairs and festivals for purposes such as recruitment campaigns, for example by private companies or the armed forces. Complex urban planning proposals may be organised into a mobile exhibition bus for the purposes of public consultation.

=== Goods transport ===
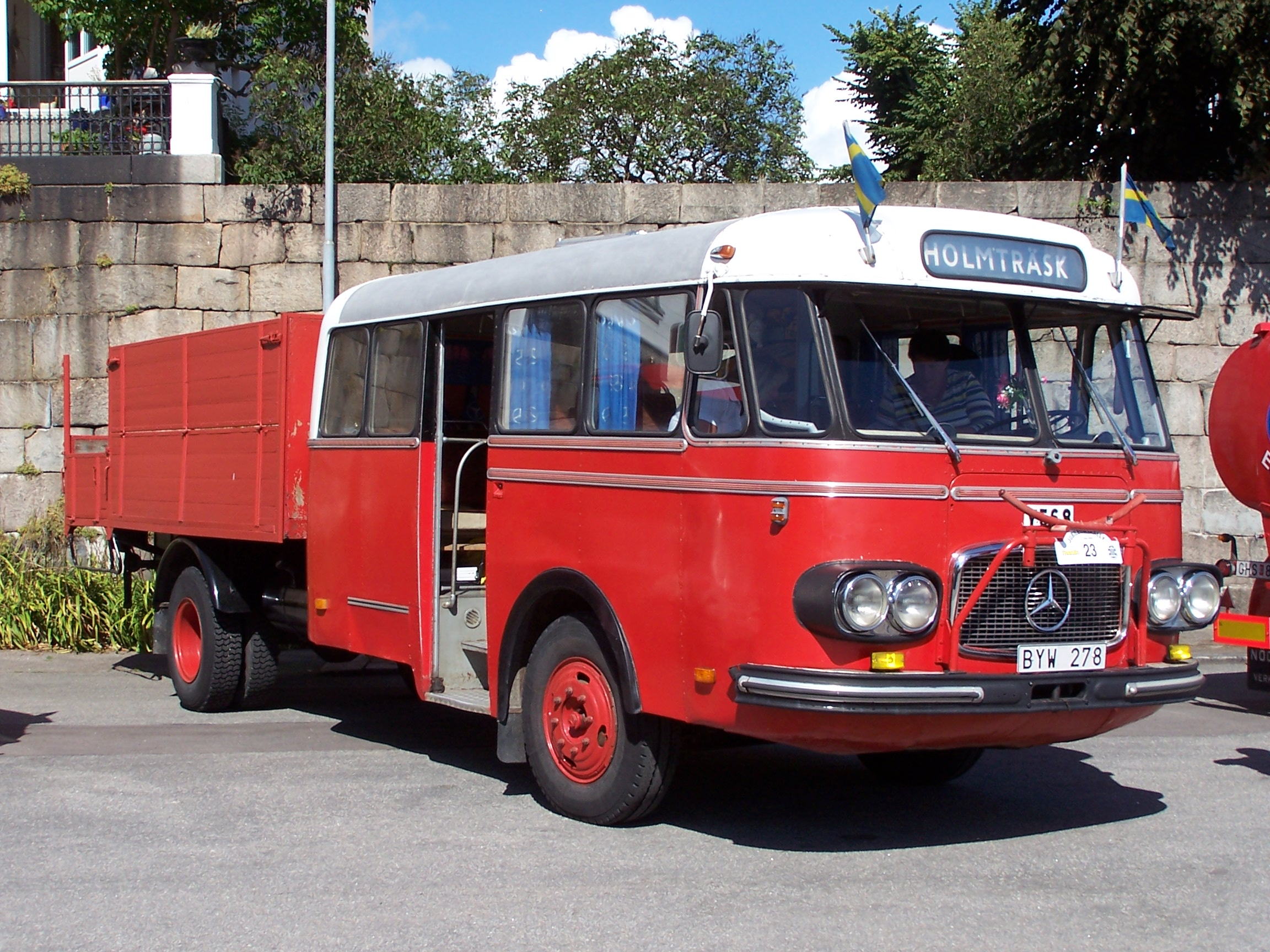
A 1965 Mercedes-Benz LPO 322 Bruck in Karlskrona, Sweden (2005)

In some sparsely populated areas, it is common to use brucks, buses with a cargo area to transport both passengers and cargo at the same time. They are especially common in the Nordic countries.

== Around the world ==
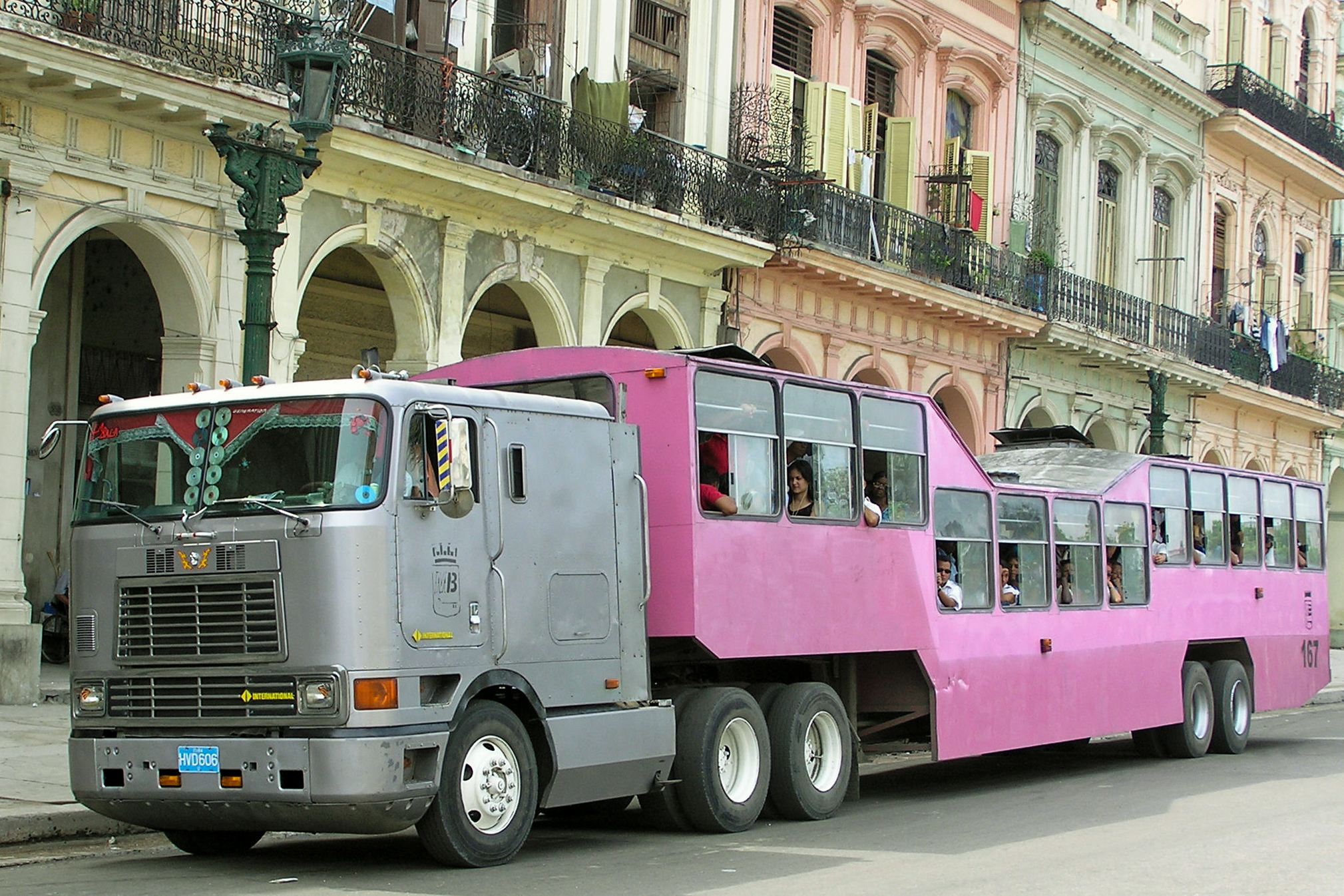
Trailer bus in Havana (2006)

Historically, the types and features of buses have developed according to local needs. Buses were fitted with technology appropriate to the local climate or passenger needs, such as air conditioning in Asia, or cycle mounts on North American buses. The bus types in use in countries where there was little mass production were often sourced secondhand from other countries, such as the Malta bus, and buses in use in Africa. Other countries such as Cuba required novel solutions to import restrictions, with the creation of the "camellos" (camel bus), a specially manufactured trailer bus.

After the Second World War, manufacturers in Europe and the Far East, such as Mercedes-Benz buses and Mitsubishi Fuso, expanded into other continents, influencing the use of buses previously served by local types. Use of buses around the world has also been influenced by colonial associations or political alliances between countries. Several of the Commonwealth nations followed the British lead and sourced buses from British manufacturers, leading to a prevalence of double-decker buses. Several Eastern Bloc countries adopted trolleybus systems, and their manufacturers such as Trolza exported trolleybuses to other friendly states. In the 1930s, Italy designed the world's only triple decker bus for the busy route between Rome and Tivoli that could carry eighty-eight passengers. It was unique not only in being a triple decker but also in having a separate smoking compartment on the third level.

The buses to be found in countries around the world often reflect the quality of the local road network, with high-floor resilient truck-based designs prevalent in several less developed countries where buses are subject to tough operating conditions. Population density also has a major impact, where dense urbanisation such as in Japan and the Far East has led to the adoption of high capacity long multi-axle buses, often double-deckers, while South America and China are implementing large numbers of articulated buses for bus rapid transit schemes.

=== Bus expositions ===
Euro Bus Expo is a trade show, which is held biennially at the UK's National Exhibition Centre in Birmingham. As the official show of the Confederation of Passenger Transport, the UK's trade association for the bus, coach and light rail industry, the three-day event offers visitors from Europe and beyond the chance to see and experience the very latest vehicles and product and service innovations right across the industry.

Busworld Kortrijk in Kortrijk, Belgium, is the leading bus trade fair in Europe. It is also held biennially.

== Use of retired buses ==
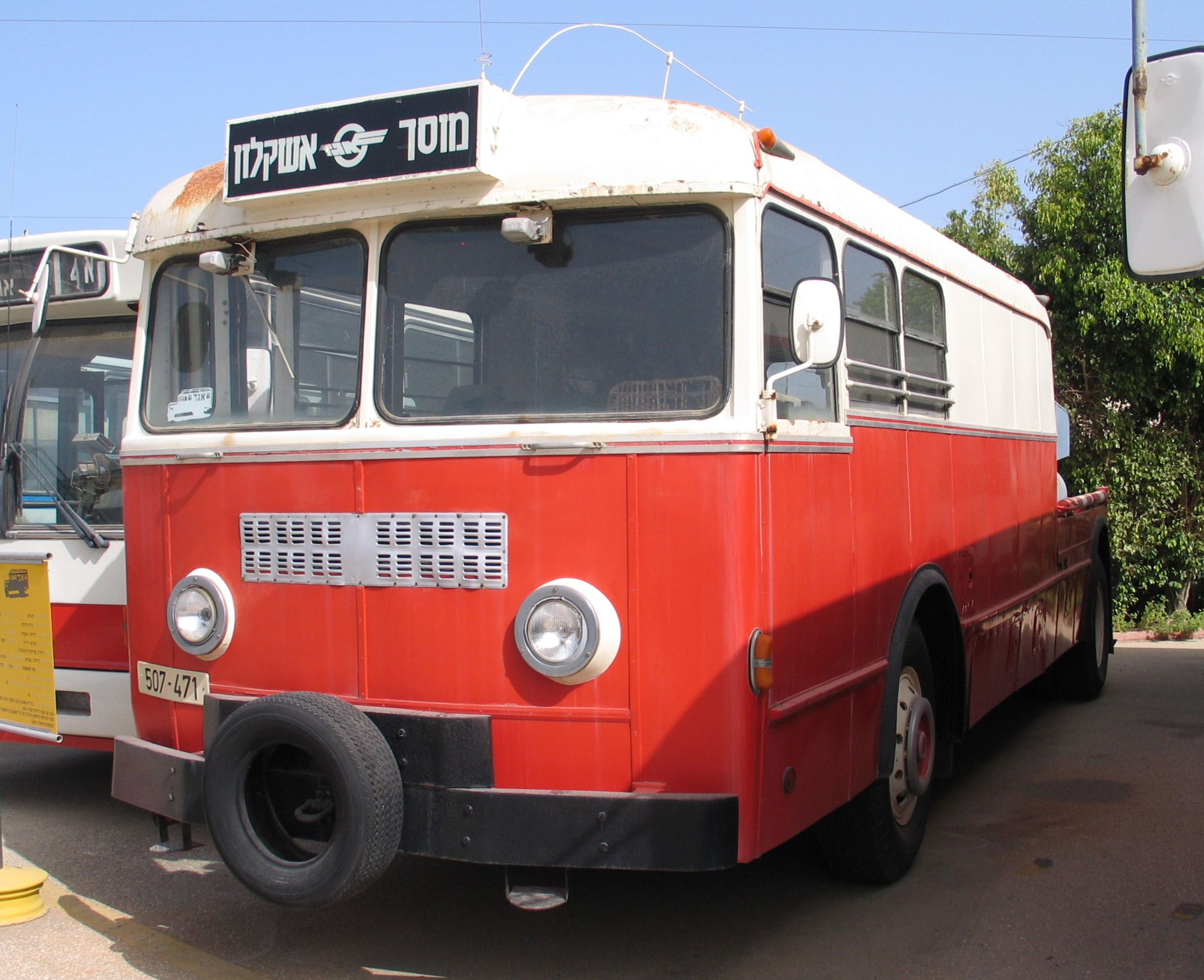
Retired bus in Israel used as a tow truck (2008)

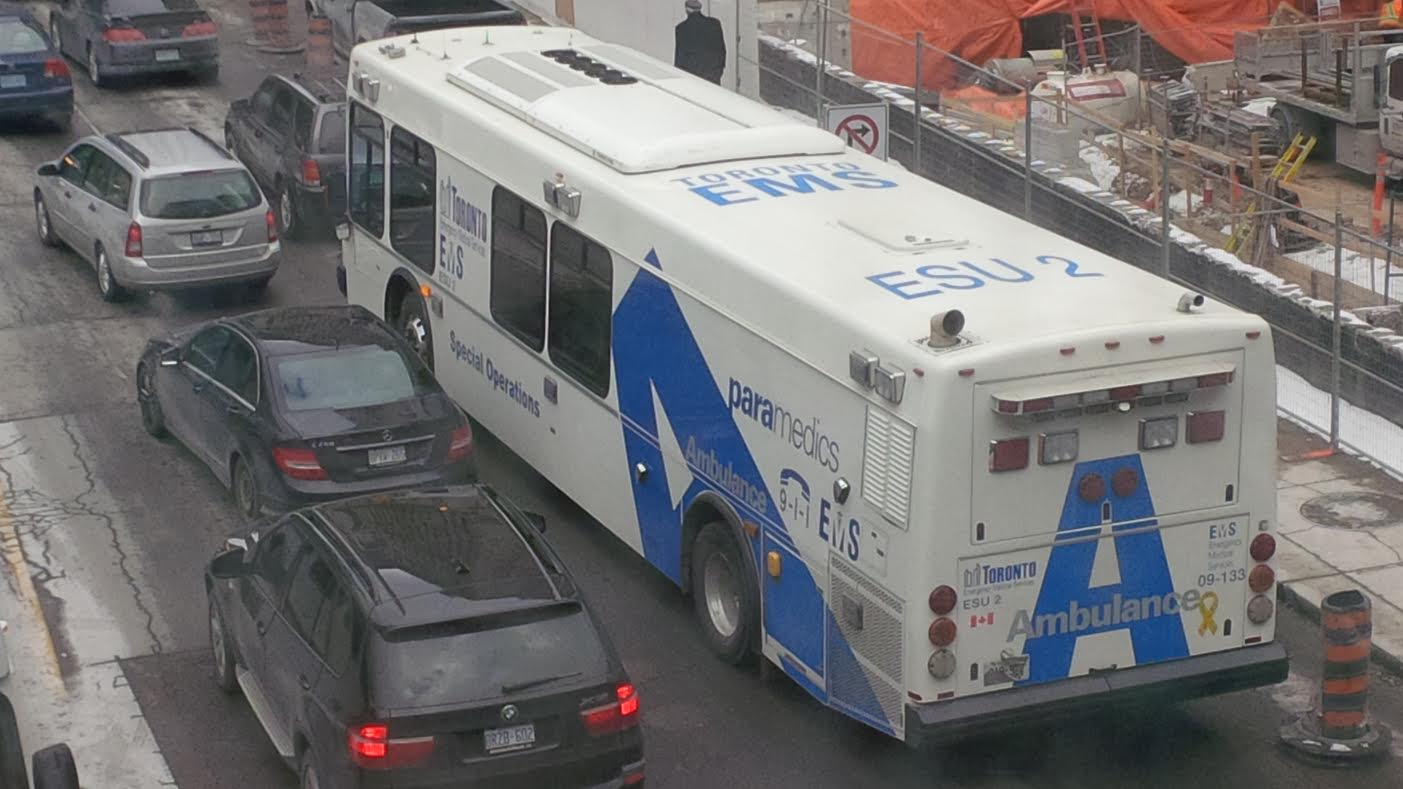
A retired bus is used for an ambulance bus in Toronto (2014)

Most public or private buses and coaches, once they have reached the end of their service with one or more operators, are sent to the wrecking yard for breaking up for scrap and spare parts. Some buses which are not economical to keep running as service buses are often converted for use other than revenue-earning transport. Much like old cars and trucks, buses often pass through a dealership where they can be bought privately or at auction.

Bus operators often find it economical to convert retired buses to use as permanent training buses for driver training, rather than taking a regular service bus out of use. Some large operators have also converted retired buses into tow bus vehicles, to act as tow trucks. With the outsourcing of maintenance staff and facilities, the increase in company health and safety regulations, and the increasing curb weights of buses, many operators now contract their towing needs to a professional vehicle recovery company.

Some buses that have reached the end of their service that are still in good condition are sent for export to other countries.

Some retired buses have been converted to static or mobile cafés, often using historic buses as a tourist attraction. There are also catering buses: buses converted into a mobile canteen and break room. These are commonly seen at external filming locations to feed the cast and crew, and at other large events to feed staff. Another use is as an emergency vehicle, such as high-capacity ambulance bus or mobile command centre.

Some organisations adapt and operate playbuses or learning buses to provide a playground or learning environments to children who might not have access to proper play areas. An ex-London AEC Routemaster bus has been converted to a mobile theatre and catwalk fashion show.

Some buses meet a destructive end by being entered in banger races or at demolition derbies. A larger number of old retired buses have also been converted into mobile holiday homes and campers.

=== Bus preservation ===
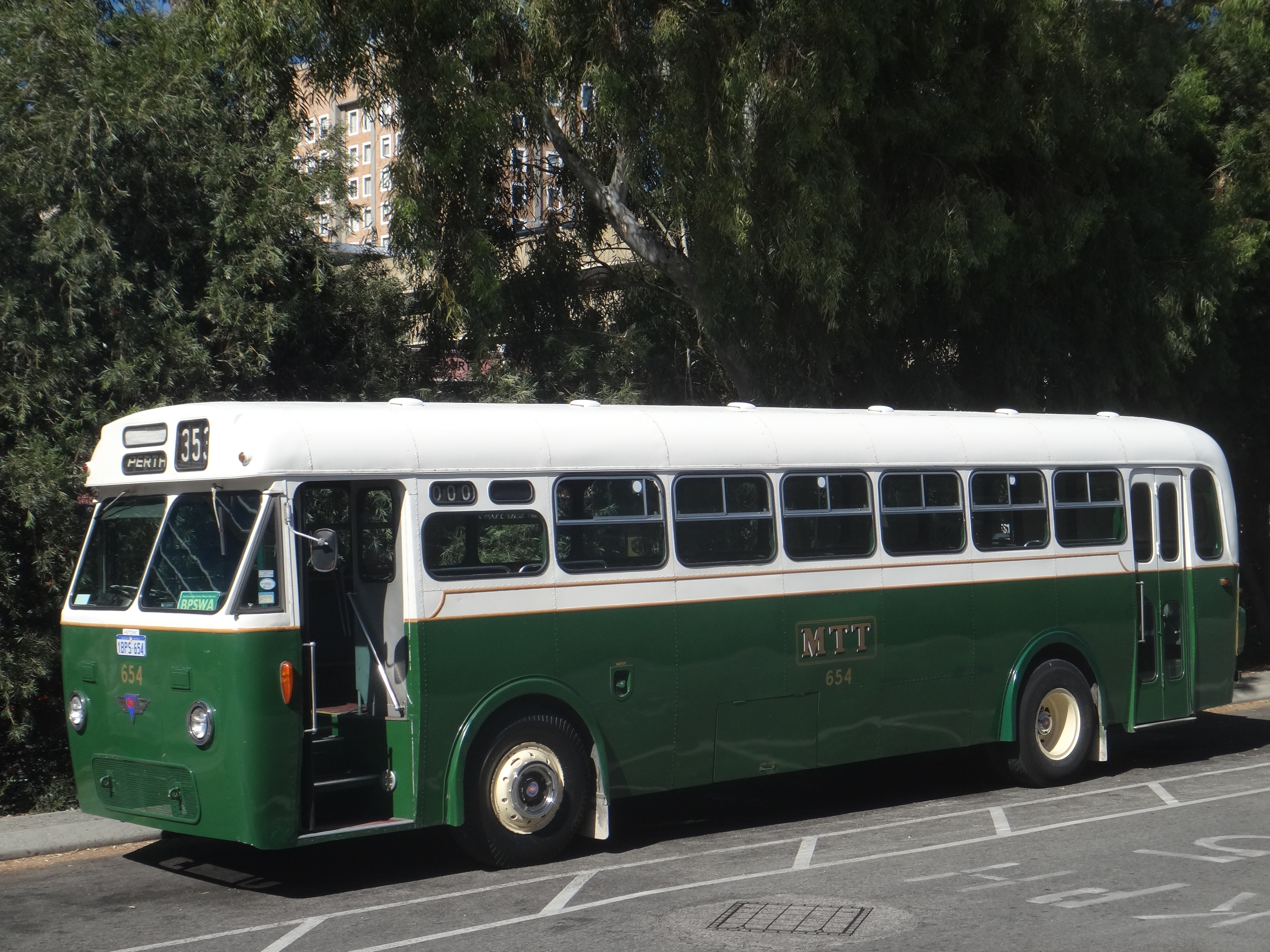
Preserved 1965 AEC Regal VI formerly operated by the Metropolitan Transport Trust in Perth, Australia

Rather than being scrapped or converted for other uses, sometimes retired buses are saved for preservation. This can be done by individuals, volunteer preservation groups or charitable trusts, museums, or sometimes by the operators themselves as part of a heritage fleet. These buses often need to be restored to their original condition and will have their livery and other details such as internal notices and rollsigns restored to be authentic to a specific time in the bus's history. Some buses that undergo preservation are rescued from a state of great disrepair, but others enter preservation with very little wrong with them. As with other historic vehicles, many preserved buses either in a working or static state form part of the collections of transport museums. Additionally, some buses are preserved so they can appear alongside other period vehicles in television and film. Working buses will often be exhibited at rallies and events, and they are also used as charter buses. While many preserved buses are quite old or even vintage, in some cases relatively new examples of a bus type can enter restoration. In-service examples are still in use by other operators. This often happens when a change in design or operating practice, such as the switch to one person operation or low floor technology, renders some buses redundant while still relatively new.

== See also ==
- Bicycle carrier (bus mounted bike racks)
- Bus spotting
- Bus station
- Charabanc
- Coach (bus)
- Cutaway bus
- Dollar van
- Horse-drawn omnibus
- Intercity bus
- Intercity bus driver
- List of fictional buses
- Public light bus
- Trackless train
- Transit bus
- Transit Elevated Bus

== Bibliography ==
- Combeau, Yvan (2013). Histoire de Paris. Paris: Presses Universitaires de France. ISBN 978-2-13-060852-3.
- Fierro, Alfred (1996). Histoire et dictionnaire de Paris. Robert Laffont. ISBN 2-221-07862-4.
- Héron de Villefosse, René (1959). Histoire de Paris. Bernard Grasset.
