= Training bus =

Bus used for training bus drivers

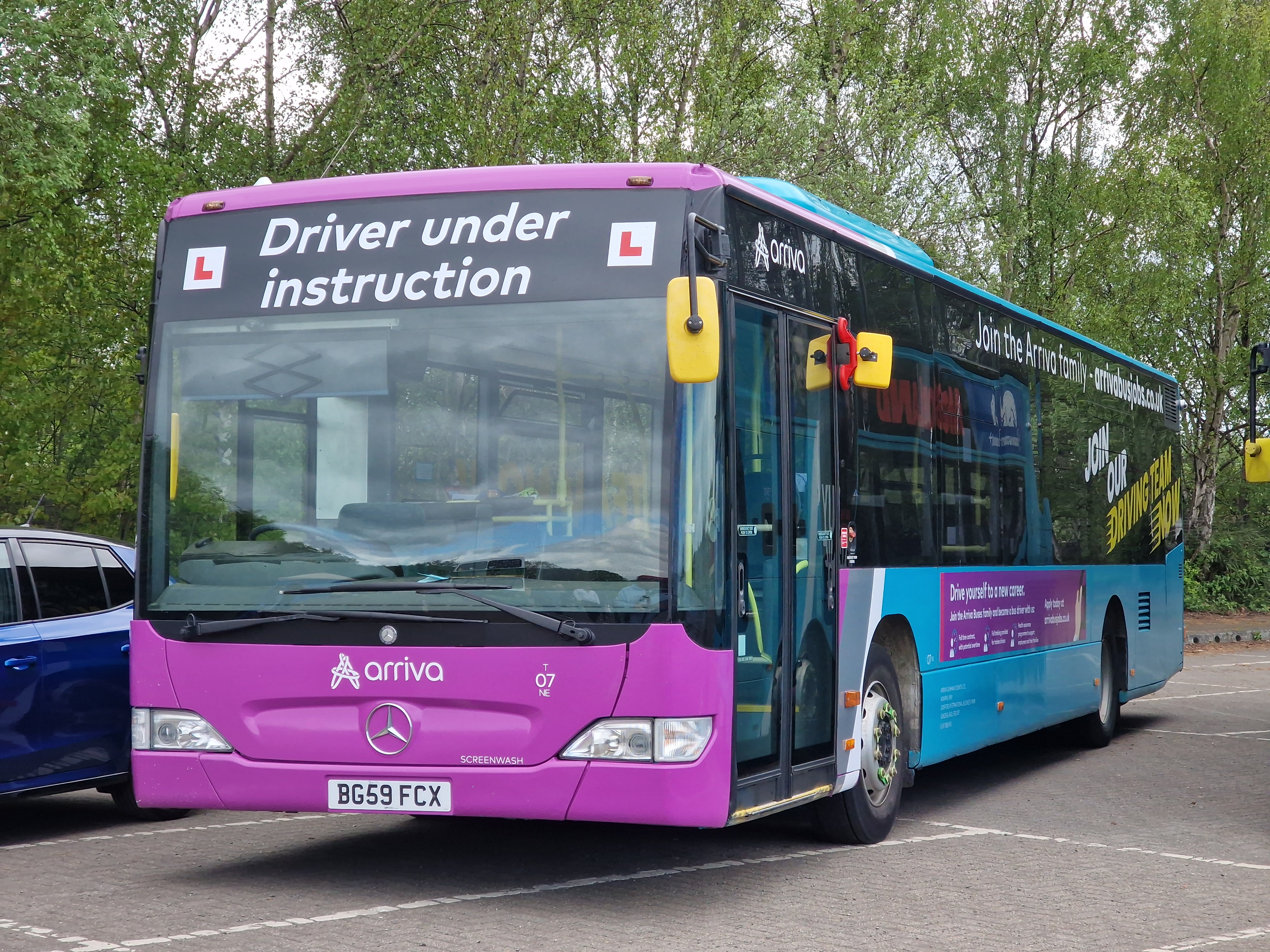
An Arriva North East training bus in Gateshead, England

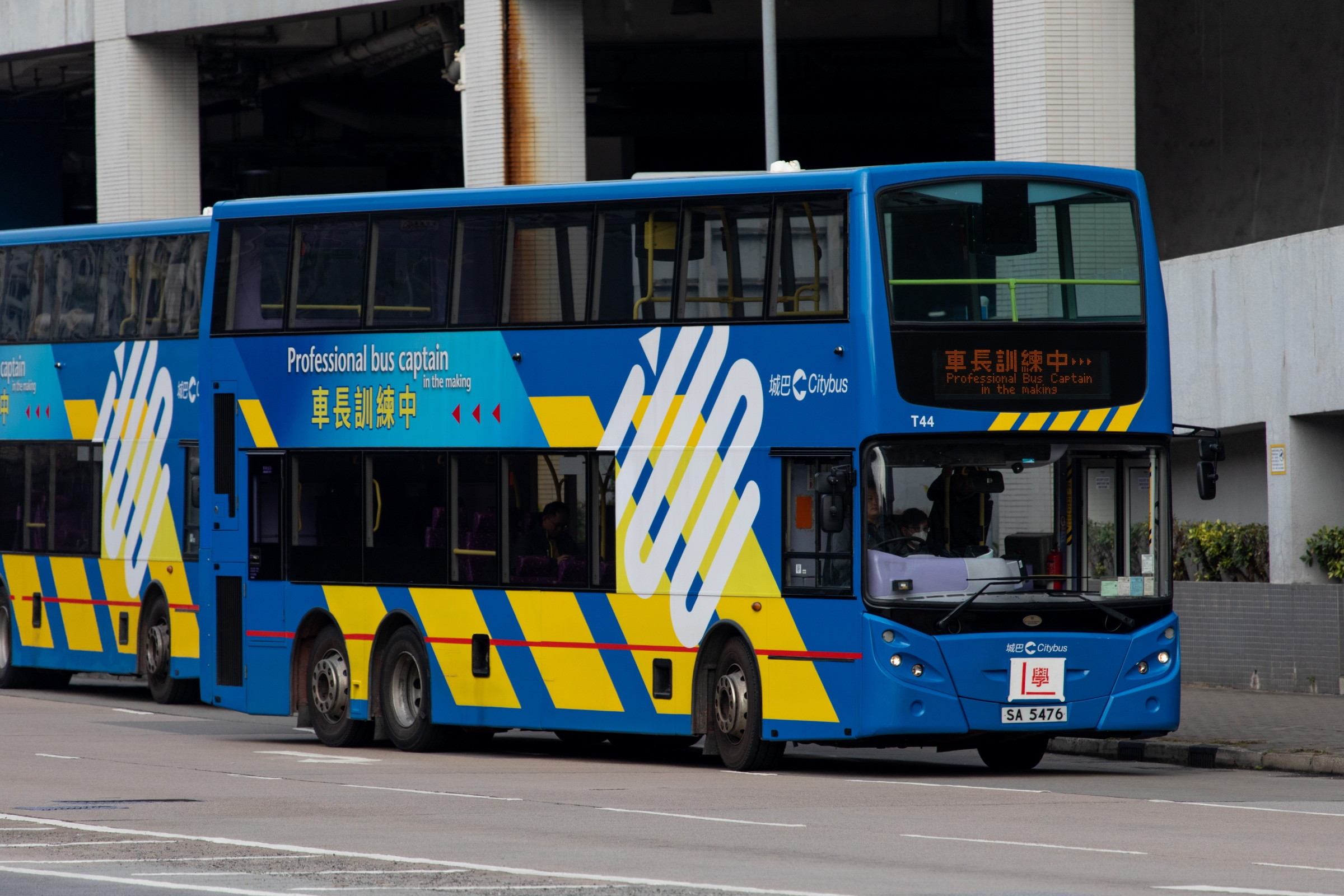
A training bus operated by Citybus in Hong Kong

A training bus is a special kind of bus or coach that is used by bus operators for training the driving skills of bus drivers. It is also used to train the driving skill of a person who is learning to become a bus driver. Driving a training bus on the road is an important part of driving training, as this is the most practical way to train one's driving skills.

A training bus is usually a bus that has been retired from the passenger-serving fleet. Some bus companies may like to repaint the bus with a special livery for training bus after the bus is retired from the passenger-serving fleet, which is usually white or a plainer version of the company's regular livery. Some bus companies may also remove most of the facilities (such as passenger seats) from a training bus, so that those facilities can be installed onto newer buses. On a training bus, there is usually another seat for the driving instructor (trainer) next to the driver's seat. This allows the instructor to monitor how the trainee is driving and give appropriate instruction when necessary. They may also have a separate handbrake or foot-operated brake in order to slow or stop the bus.

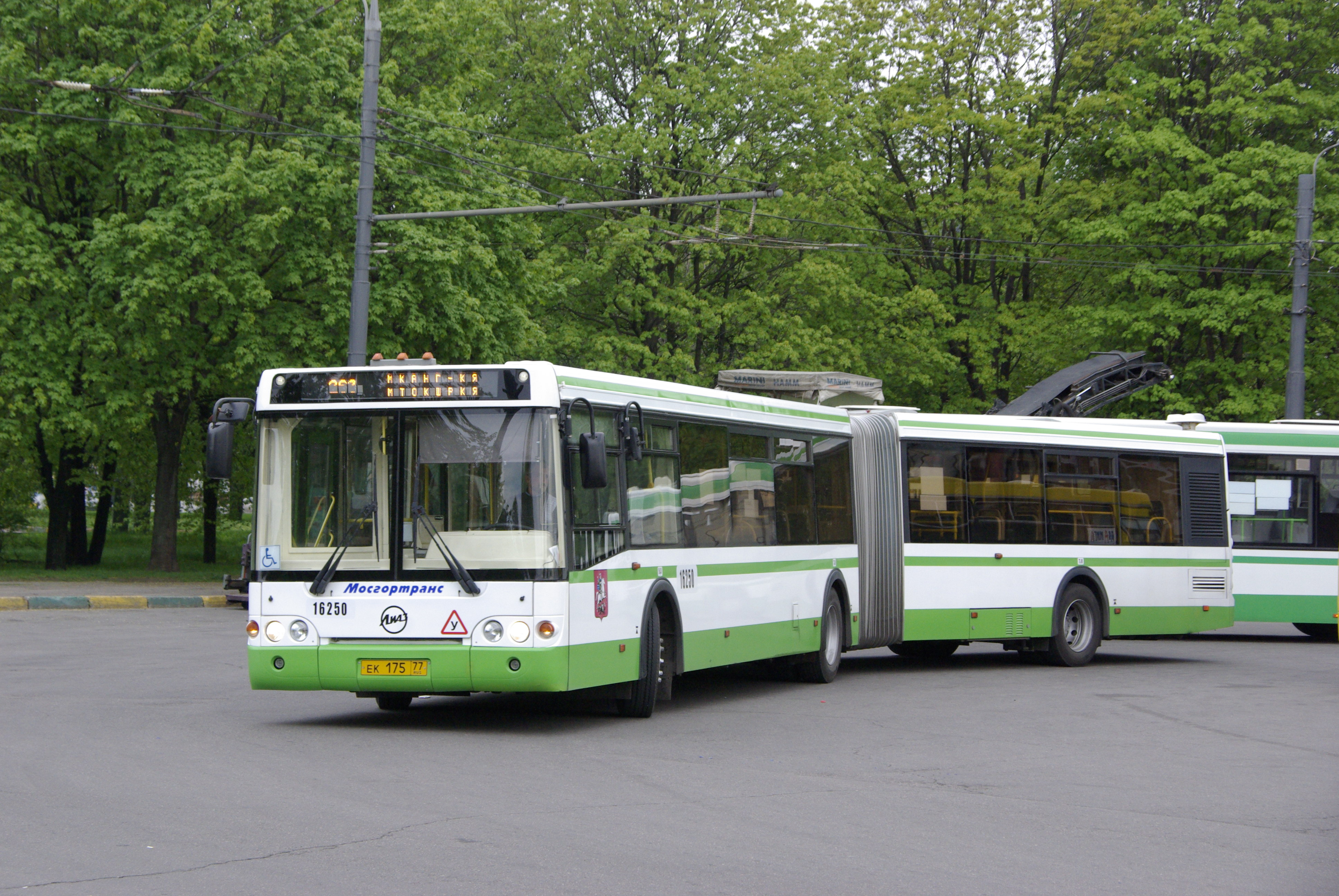
A LiAZ-6213.20 bus on route 263 of Mosgortrans in Moscow, Russia. Photo taken in 2011. The bus on photo was produced and put in service in 2010, fully retired in January 2022. It was fully equipped for both tasks: as a regular bus (e.g. with seats, route indicators, ticket readers, etc.) and as a driving school bus (larger driver's cabin, additional mirrors, stickers). Such buses may be used both for training and for regular routes, but not at the same time.

Some bus operators, however, also purchase and use regular buses with an instructor's cabin.

== Hong Kong ==
The use of training buses for practical training is especially popular among the Hong Kong franchised bus companies. In Hong Kong, training buses are known in Chinese as "訓練巴士" (pinyin: Xùn liàn bā Shì). Training buses used in Hong Kong, such as those used at Kowloon Motor Bus, are typically buses that are older buses and retired from its main bus fleet, therefore only used for training purposes and not for passenger services. However, for route training and other service or safety improvement trainings, in-service buses may be used.

== Other cities ==
In contrast, other jurisdictions, such as New York City, may use active-service buses for training; this will be at non-peak service times when more buses are available. The head sign may be set to read "TRAINING BUS", and a sign may be mounted at the rear as well.

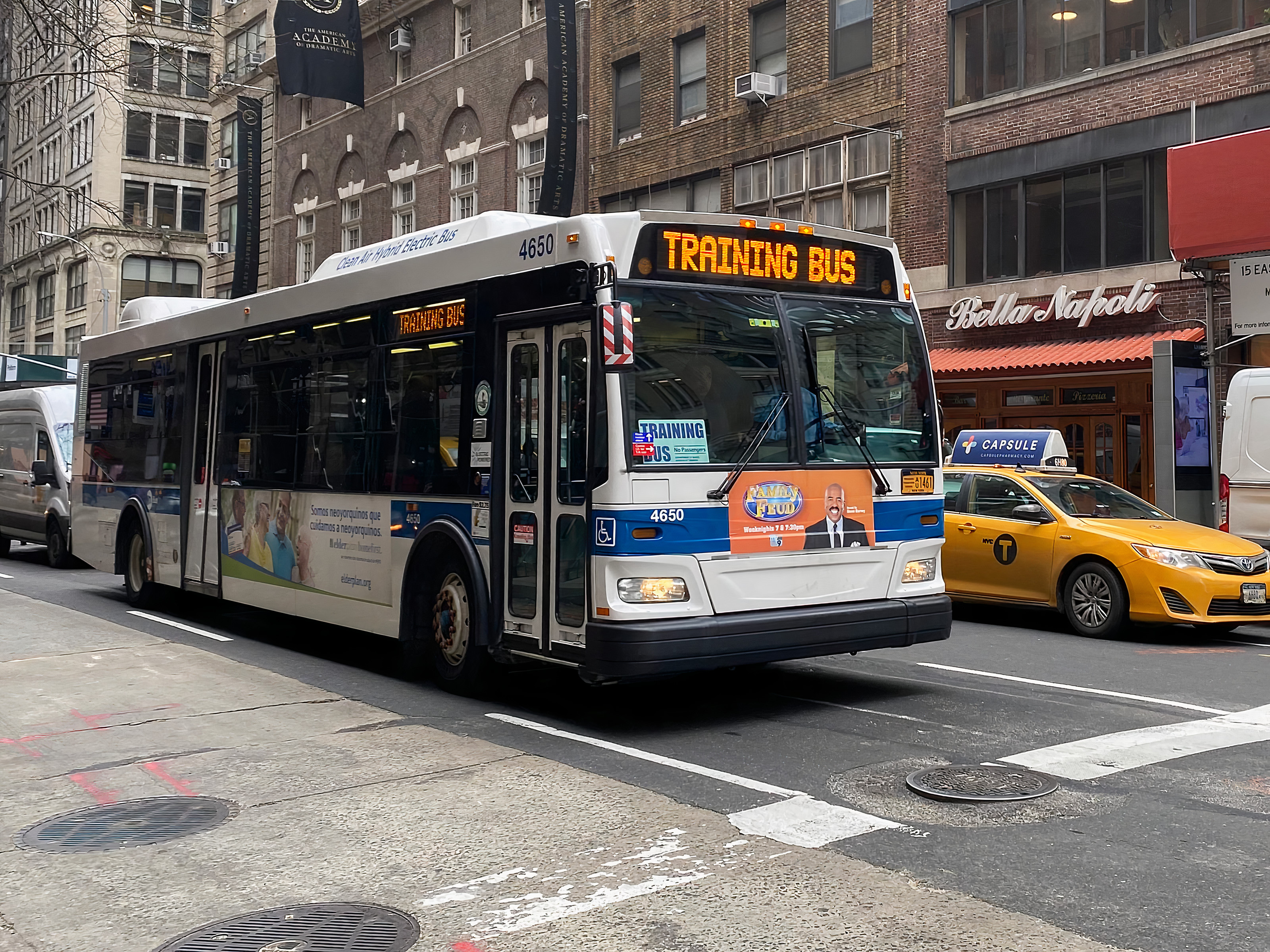
A training bus in New York City

=== Toronto ===
The Toronto Transit Commission uses training buses on regular routes or roads with sign display the bus as a training bus for real life training for new drivers. The bus will not be in service and will only stop briefly at select bus stops.

=== Mumbai ===
BEST holds 7 driver training buses at the Majas Depot.

== See also ==
- List of buses
