= School bus crossing arm =

Pedestrian safety device

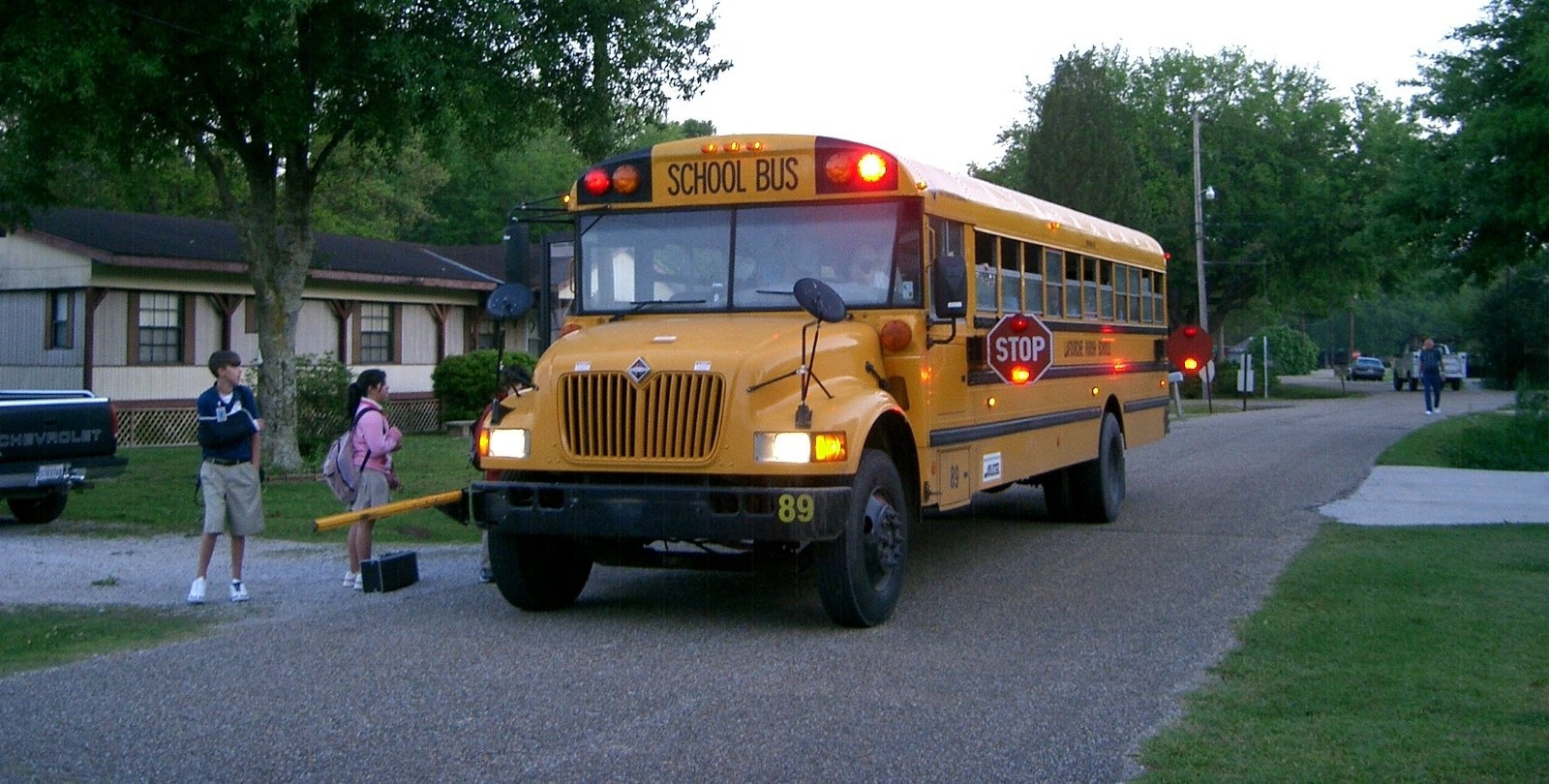
The crossing arm can be seen in use. Note the presence of the rotated yellow bar on the front bumper.

A crossing arm is a safety device intended to protect children from being struck while crossing in front of a school bus. Typically, school bus crossing arms are wire or plastic devices which extend from the front bumper on the right side of the bus when the door is open for loading/unloading and form a barrier. The devices force children, who need to cross the road, to stand several feet in front of the bus itself before they can begin to cross the road. This ensures that the bus driver can see them as they cross, avoiding a common blind spot immediately in front of the bus, closest to the bumper. The crossing arm retracts flush against the bumper when not activated, such as when the bus is in motion.

== Regulatory history ==
Unlike traffic warning lights and many other safety-related features typically found on school buses in the United States, crossing arms are not required by the Federal Motor Vehicle Safety Standards (FMVSS) for School Buses. Regulations for equipment and use vary widely on a state-by-state basis. In some places, they are optional at the discretion of a local school district or school bus contractor.

The 1990 death of six-year-old Elizabeth "Betsy" Anderson, in Washington State, led to the installation of school bus crossing arms, also referred to as "Betsy Bars" or "Betsy Gates" on all Washington state school buses by 1992. The crossing arms, when extended, require students to cross at least 5 feet (1.5 m) in front of the bus.

In Manitoba, Canada, provincial school buses have been required to have an extendable safety arm mounted on the bus since a seven-year-old boy died in 1996 in St. Norbert after getting off his school bus.
