= London Buses heritage routes =

London Buses heritage routes may refer to:

- London Buses route 9 (Heritage)
- London Buses route 15 (Heritage)
