= Heritage fleet =

Collection of historic vehicles or vessels

A Heritage Fleet is a collection of historic vehicles or vessels, representing a record of transport heritage. It may comprise to maritime vessels, aircraft, or other road or rail vehicles.

Heritage fleets may be retained by private collectors, museums, or the companies that originally operated the vehicles, passing them to the heritage fleet on retirement. The vehicles in heritage fleets may undergo vehicle restoration to various degrees to bring them back to their past operating condition (for example, see the Union Pacific Heritage Fleet), after which they may then be exhibited as show vehicles, or used as vehicles for hire.

The name Heritage Fleet may also be applied by a transport operator or company as a less derogatory term for elderly vehicles still in use that may be considerably older than other in-service vehicles, such as the Amtrak Heritage Fleet of original rolling stock — which was acquired at its inception.

== See also ==
- Heritage aircraft
- Heritage streetcar
