= Blackburn Boulevard bus station =

Former bus station in Blackburn, Lancashire, England

General information
- Location: Blackburn; Blackburn with Darwen; United Kingdom
- Coordinates: 53.747°N 2.480°W
- Bus stands: 17
- Bus operators: Blackburn Bus Company, Stagecoach North West, Rosso, Holmeswood Coaches, M&M Coaches.
- Connections: Blackburn railway station (adjacent)

History
- Closed: 22 September 2013
Location
- Location within Blackburn town centre

Blackburn Boulevard bus station served the town of Blackburn, Lancashire, England. The bus station was situated adjacent to the Blackburn railway station and the town's Cathedral in the town centre.

The main operators from the bus station were Lancashire United; the company acquired the formerly municipal company Blackburn Transport in January 2007. Other services were operated by Stagecoach North West, Rosso, M&M Coaches, Holmeswood Coaches, J&S Travel and Darwen Coach Services. There are also infrequent coach services of National Express.

Buses travelled from the bus station around the Blackburn with Darwen area and went as far afield as Burnley, Rawtenstall, Bolton, Manchester, Preston and Clitheroe.

On 22 September 2013, the Boulevard closed, to pave the way for the redevelopment of the Cathedral Quarter. All bus services served an interim bus station on the former market site, pending the opening of a new bus station on a new site 200 yards (200 m) to the north of the Boulevard site, which officially opened on Sunday, 1 May 2016.

Construction began in March 2014, and the first windows were installed in March 2015. Originally, the bus station was due to open in January 2015, as announced in October 2014. It was then delayed to June 2015, then later to December. In September 2015, it was delayed again, this time to 2016.
