= Burnley bus station =

Bus station in Burnley, Lancashire, England

General information
- Location: Burnley; Burnley
- Coordinates: 53.788°N 2.240°W
- Operator: Lancashire County Council
- Bus stands: 11
- Bus operators: Burnley Bus Company, Blackburn Bus Company, First West Yorkshire, M&M Coaches, Pilkingtons Buses, Rosso, Pennine, Tyrer Bus
- Connections: Burnley Manchester Road railway station; Burnley Central railway station

History
- Opened: 29 October 2002
Location
- Location within Burnley town centre

Burnley bus station serves the town of Burnley, Lancashire, England. The bus station was funded by both the Lancashire County Council and Burnley Borough Council. The station was opened in October 2002, at a total cost of £3M and consists of 11 stands, a travel centre and electronic passenger boards. It was designed by SBS Architects.

== Services ==
The main operators from the bus station are Blackburn Bus Company, Burnley Bus Company, First West Yorkshire, Rosso, and Holmeswood Bus, as well as National Express.

== Gallery ==
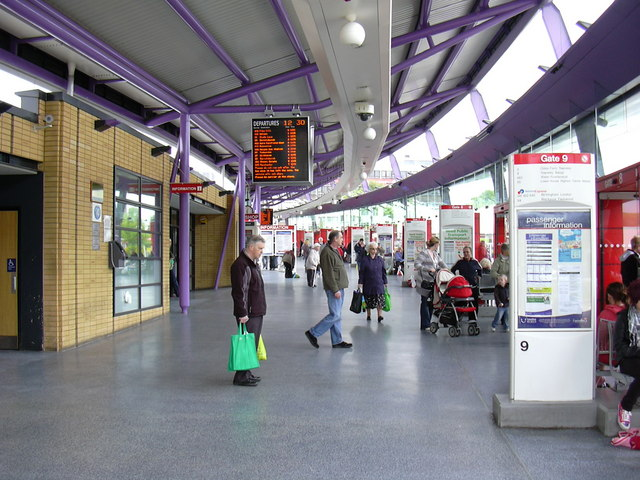
Inside Burnley bus station

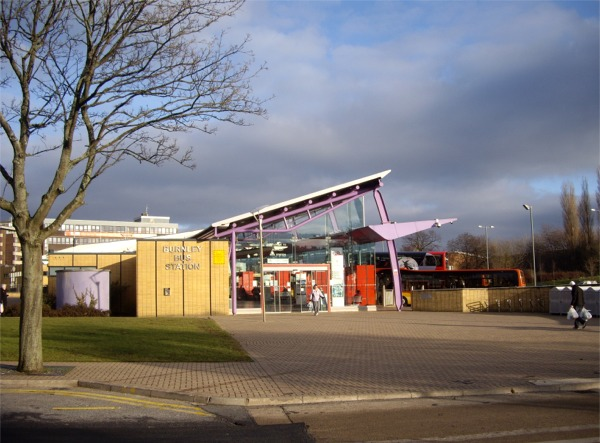
Outside Burnley bus station

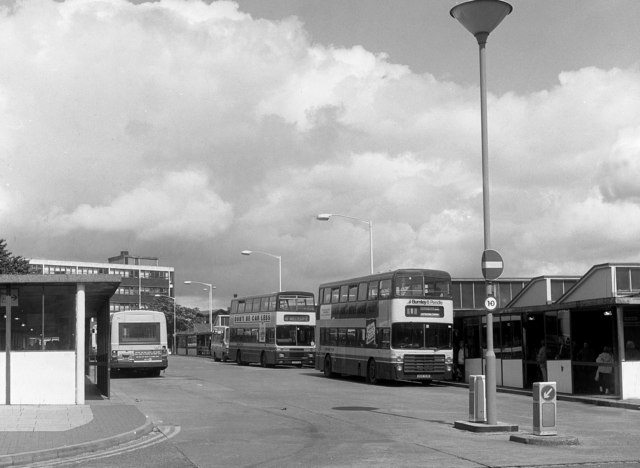
Burnley bus station in 1993
