= Northern Blue =

Northern Blue may refer to:

- Plebejus idas, a butterfly
- Transdev Northern Blue, former bus operator in England
