= Burnley Bus Company =

Transdev-owned bus operator in England

The Burnley Bus Company

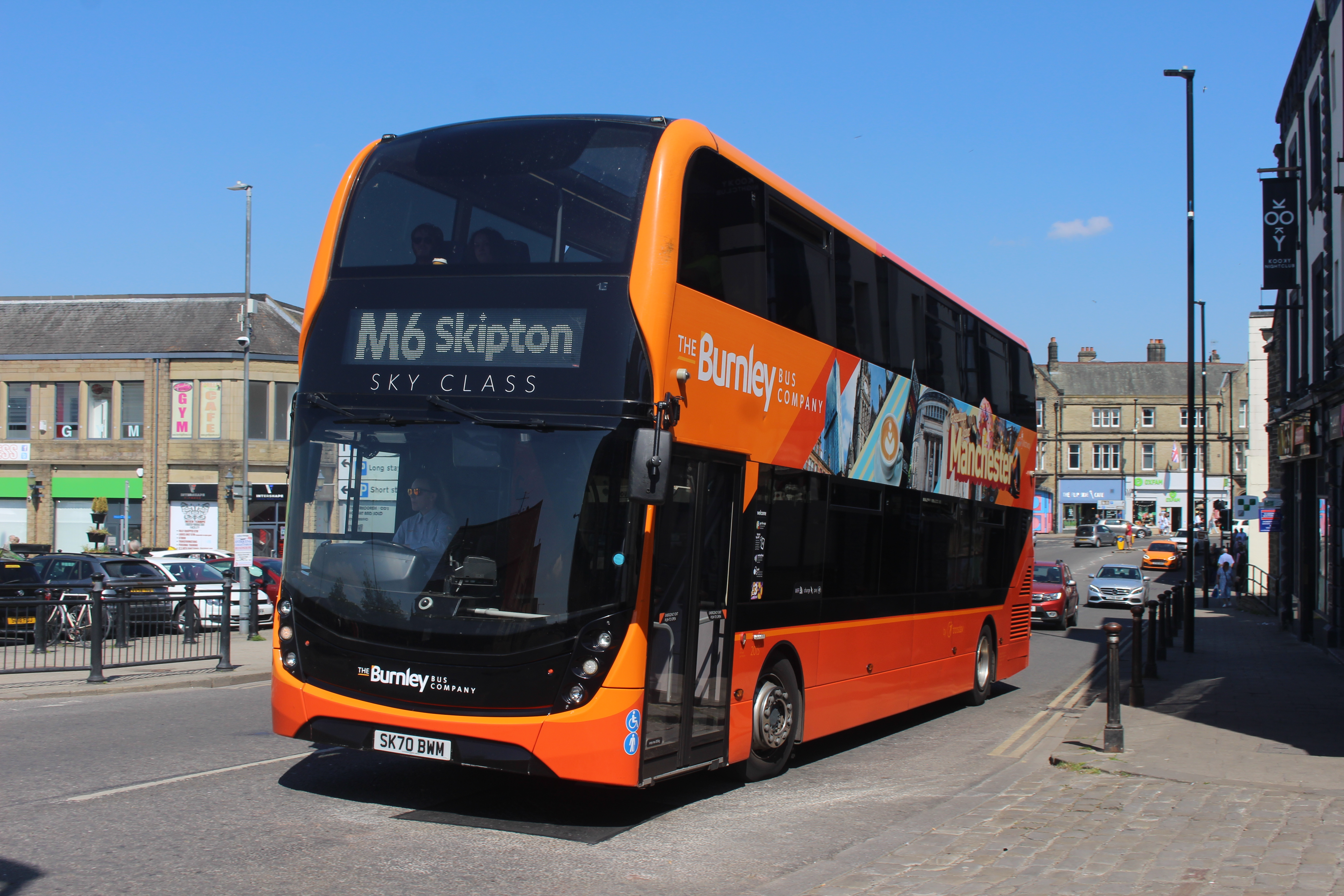
- Alexander Dennis Enviro400 MMC approaching Skipton bus station in May 2025
- Parent: Transdev Blazefield
- Founded: August 1924; 101 years ago
- Headquarters: Harrogate, North Yorkshire, England
- Service area: Greater Manchester; Lancashire
- Service type: Bus
- Stations: Burnley Bus Station
- Depots: 1
- Fleet: 87 (April 2024)
- Website: Official website

The Burnley Bus Company operates both local and regional bus services in Greater Manchester, West Yorkshire, North Yorkshire and Lancashire, England. It is a subsidiary of Transdev Blazefield, which operates bus services across Greater Manchester, Lancashire, North Yorkshire and West Yorkshire.

== History ==
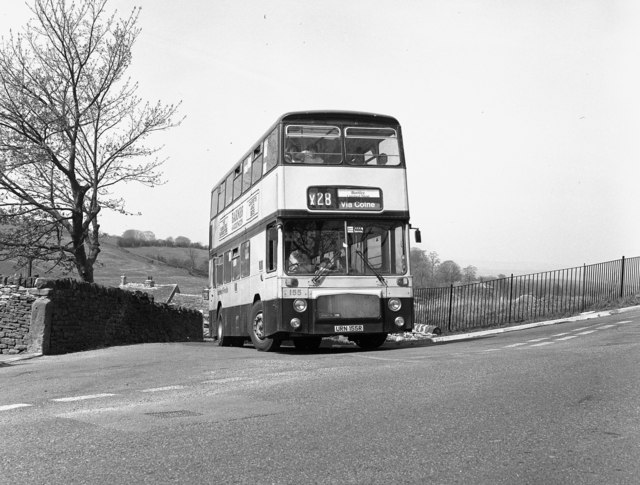
East Lancashire Coachbuilders bodied Bristol VR in Barnoldswick in April 1984

In August 1924, Burnley Corporation Transport operated their first bus service between Rawtenstall and Burnley Summit. The Burnley, Colne & Nelson Joint Transport Committee was established in April 1933, merging the three municipal tramway and bus operations of the respective towns. The tramway network was progressively abandoned, with the last line closing in May 1935.

Following local government reorganisation in April 1974, the boroughs of Colne and Nelson were amalgamated to form the present-day Borough of Pendle. Subsequently, the transport operation became known as the Burnley & Pendle Joint Transport Committee.

In 1986, as part of the deregulation of bus services and to comply with the Transport Act 1985, the company's assets were transferred to a new legal entity named the Burnley & Pendle Transport Company. Deregulation opened Burnley & Pendle's routes to competition from other operators, with Blackburn Transport, Tyrer Tours and Victoria Coaches establishing competing services. To stave off the competition, five AEC Routemaster double-deck vehicles were purchased, with each named after a character from the television series EastEnders. Burnley & Pendle also successfully tendered a number of Greater Manchester Passenger Transport Executive-contracted bus services, allowing for operations to extend to Blackburn, Bury, Manchester, Preston, Rawtenstall, Rochdale and Skipton.

=== Stagecoach and Blazefield ownership ===
In April 1996, Pendle Borough Council sold their share of the company to Stagecoach Holdings. Burnley Council was unhappy with the decision, and stated that they would never consider selling their share. In response, Stagecoach proposed up a multi-million pound investment plan for the area, but Burnley Council could not meet their share unless it cut other council-supported services. Burnley Council eventually reversed their decision in March 1997 and sold out to Stagecoach, a deal valued at £2.85 million (equivalent to £5,618,000 in 2025). Initially branded Stagecoach Burnley & Pendle, the company was encompassed within Stagecoach Ribble in May 2000.

In April 2001, Stagecoach sold their operations in Blackburn, Bolton and Clitheroe to the Blazefield Group, which rebranded them as Burnley & Pendle and Lancashire United. The sale was valued at £13 million. Following the sale, Blazefield purchased a total of 15 Plaxton President bodied Volvo B7TL double-deck and 25 Wright Renown bodied Volvo B10BLE single-deck vehicles for Burnley & Pendle as part of a fleet renewal programme; prior to the sale of Burnley & Pendle, many of the newer vehicles Stagecoach purchased for the fleet were transferred to other subsidiaries, with Burnley & Pendle receiving older vehicles as replacements.

=== Transdev era ===
In January 2006, French-based transport group Transdev acquired the Blazefield Group, along with 305 vehicles. Locally, the company was rebranded under the name Transdev in Burnley & Pendle.

In August 2006, Blackburn with Darwen Borough Council announced that after 125 years of municipal ownership, Blackburn Transport had been sold to Transdev Blazefield. The sale was finalised in January 2007. This was followed in August 2007 by both Accrington Transport and Northern Blue being acquired, with both operators' staff and combined 65 vehicles transferring to Transdev. After initially being maintained as a separate brand, in September 2009, Transdev Northern Blue was integrated into the Transdev Burnley & Pendle business.

In July 2017, the company was again rebranded, now operating as The Burnley Bus Company.

== Services and branding ==
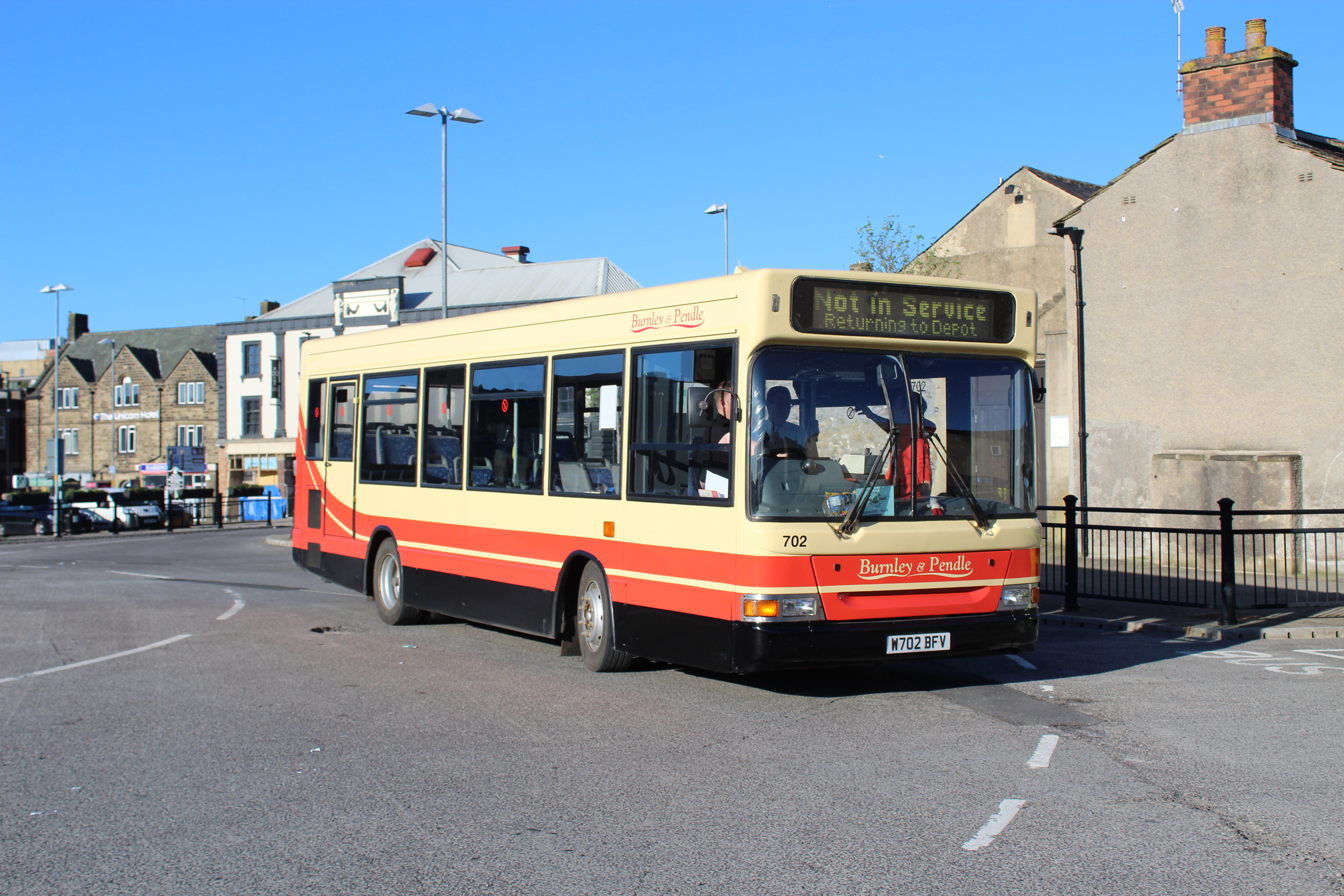
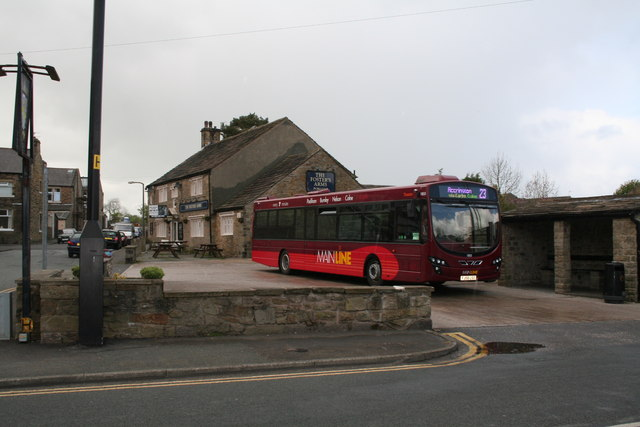
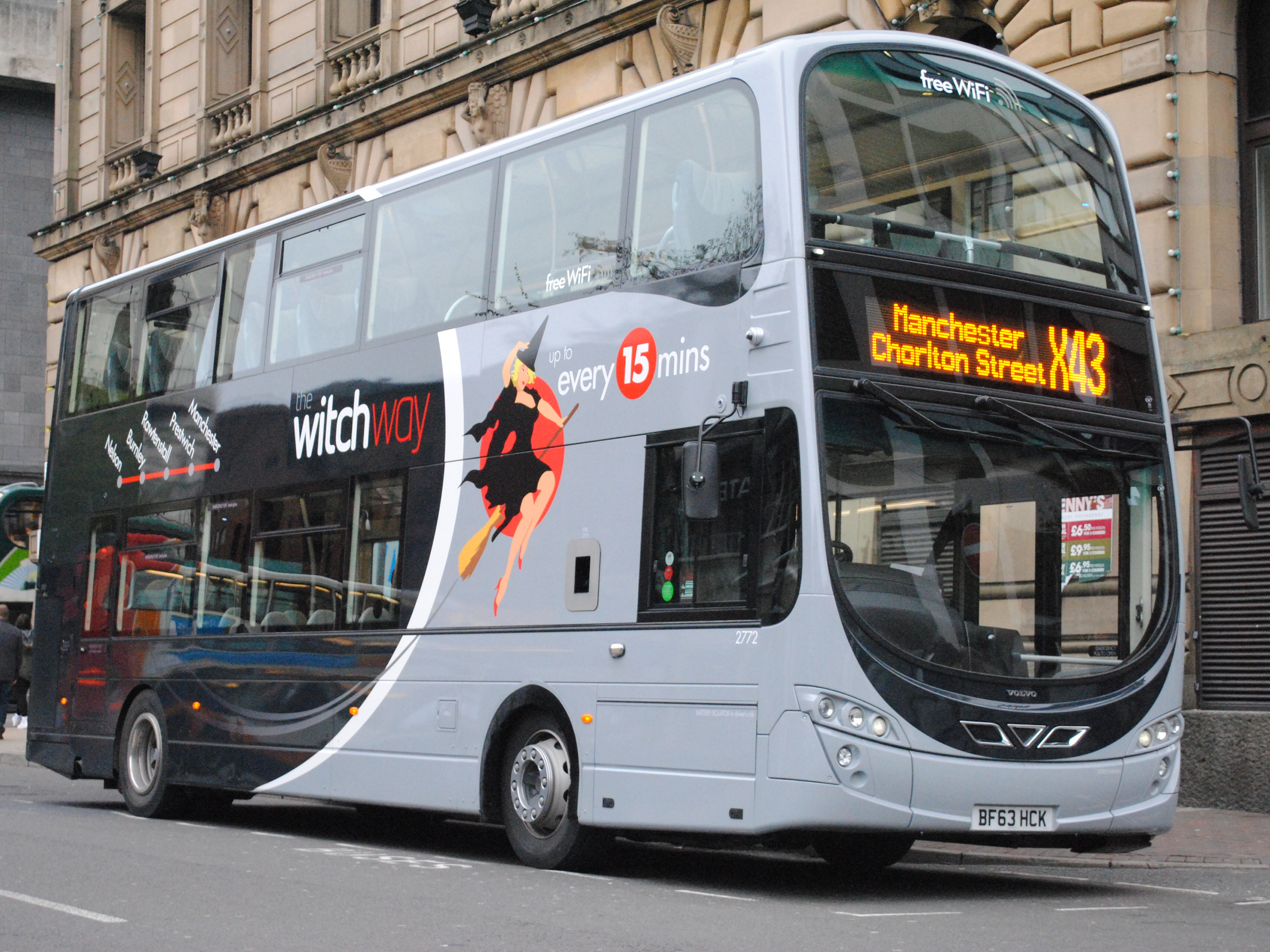
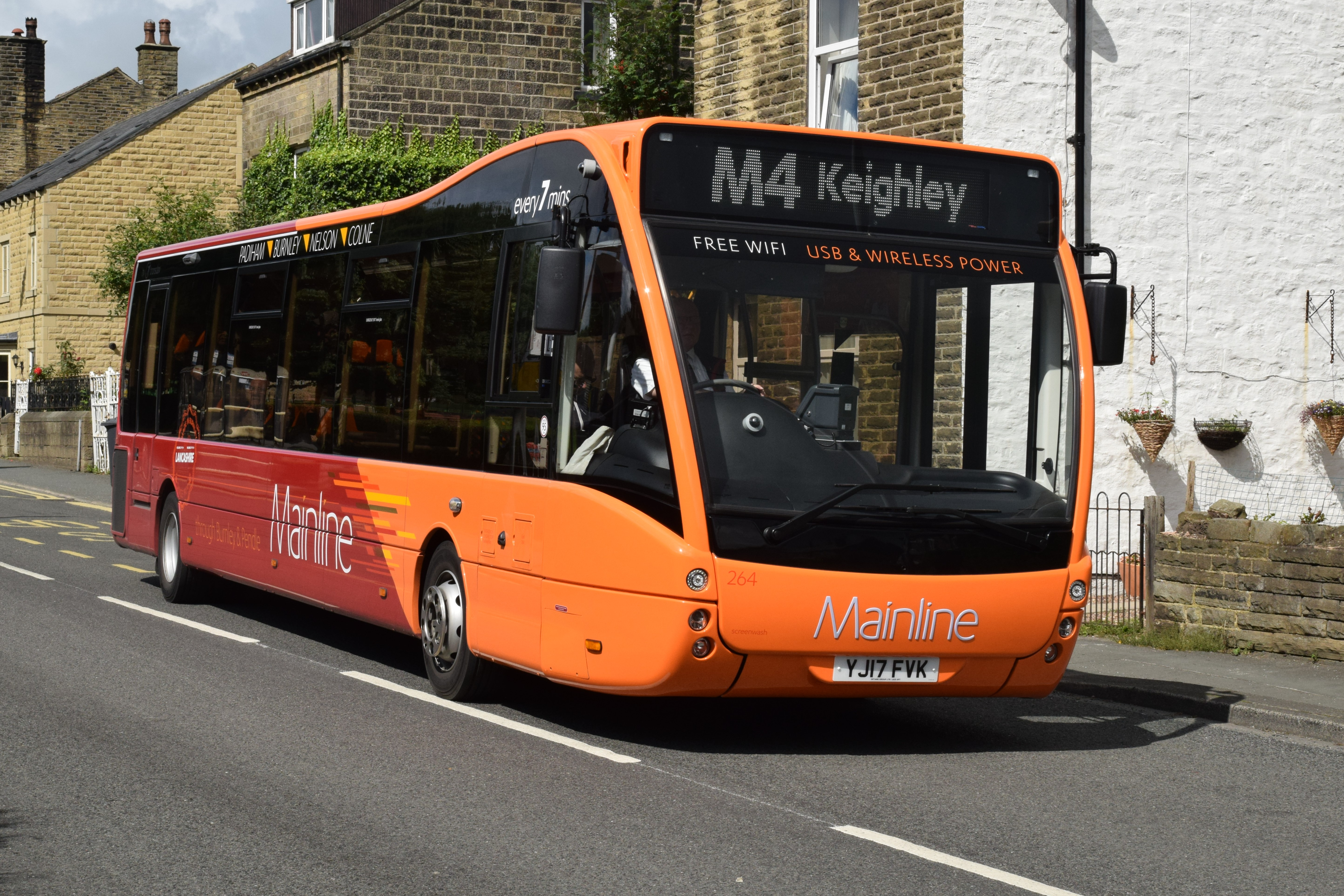
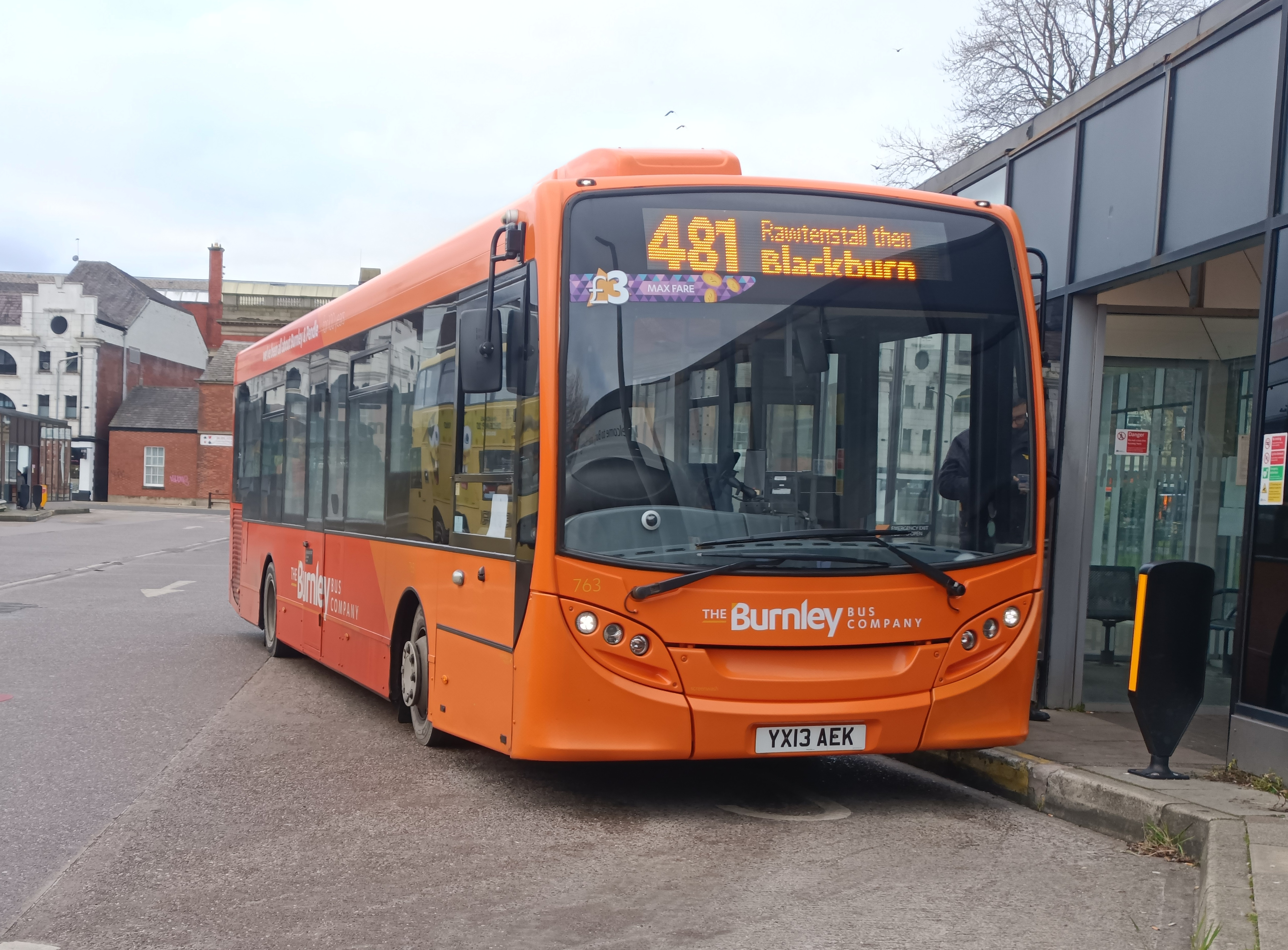
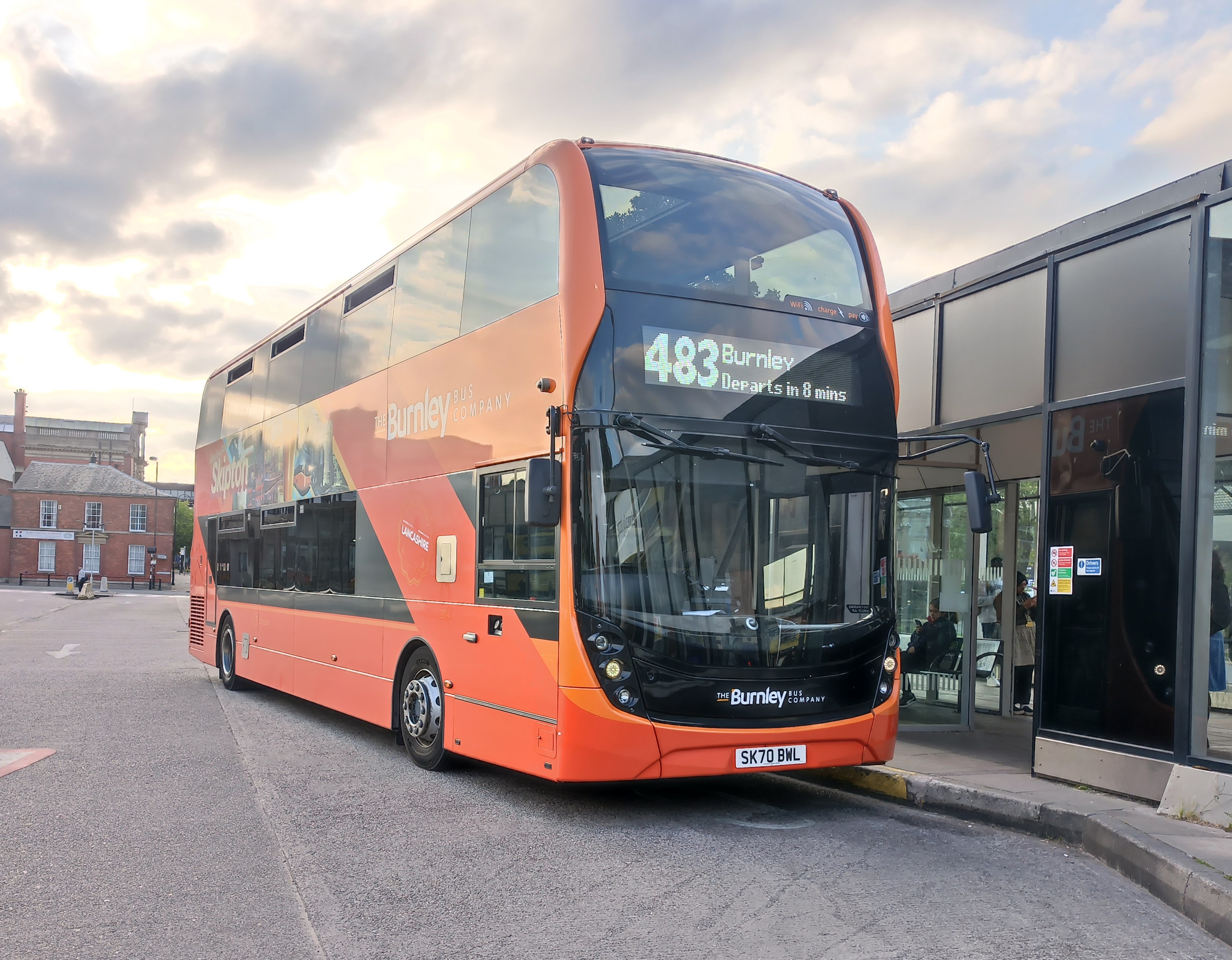
Branding: past and present

=== The Burnley Bus Company ===
In July 2017, a rebrand of the company commenced. Starting with the introduction of a new fleet of Optare Versa single-deck vehicles for Mainline, one of the vehicles was branded in the new two-tone orange livery. This was followed shortly after by a refurbished fleet of Wright Renown bodied Volvo B10BLE single-deck vehicles being repainted into the new livery. Nowadays, services are operated by a variety of vehicles, mainly Optare Solo SRs and ADL Enviro200s.

Local bus services operating in and around the town of Burnley are encompassed within The Burnley Bus Company brand, with buses serving Stoops (1), Nelson (2 and 2A), Pike Hill (3), Worsthorne (4), Harle Syke and Rosegrove (5), Bacup (8), and Accrington (9).

=== Mainline ===
The Mainline brand encompasses six services, which operate between Accrington (M1), Clitheroe (M2) and Burnley via Padiham, as well as between Burnley and Trawden (M3), Keighley (M4), Barnoldswick (M5) and Skipton (M6) via Nelson and Colne. In July 2017, the services were rebranded and upgraded to a fleet of Optare Versa single-deck vehicles, branded in a two-tone orange and burgundy livery. Features include free WiFi, USB and wireless charging and audio-visual next stop announcements.

=== Irwell Line ===
The Irwell Line brand encompassed two routes, which operated along the Irwell Valley. The routes operated between Blackburn (481) or Burnley (483) and Bury via Rawtenstall. Services were operated by a fleet of Plaxton Centro bodied Volvo B7RLE single-deck vehicles, branded in a two-tone black and grey livery. Features include free WiFi, USB charging and audio-visual next stop announcements. On 30 November 2025, this service was transferred from Rosso to the Burnley Bus Company.

=== The Witch Way ===
The Witch Way is a flagship service, which operates between Burnley and Manchester via Rawtenstall and M66. The service is operated by a fleet of high-specification Alexander Dennis Enviro 400 MMC double-deck vehicles, which were introduced into service in December 2020, replacing the former allocation of Wright Eclipse Gemini 2 bodied Volvo B9TL double-deck vehicles introduced in October 2013. Vehicles are branded in a two-tone orange and black livery, with features including free WiFi, USB and wireless charging, tables and audio-visual next stop announcements voiced by Coronation Street actress Jennie McAlpine.

== Former Services and Brands ==
=== Pendle Wizz ===
The Pendle Wizz was a new service introduced in 2020 as a replacement for the section of the Witch Way X43 between Burnley and Skipton, designed to solve the problem of congestion in Manchester city centre having knock-on effects on X43s further north, particularly for local passengers in the Colne-Skipton area.

The Pendle Wizz bus ran every hour from Burnley bus station to Colne along the M65 motorway, then on to Barnoldswick and Skipton. The route had its own branded buses: three Wright Eclipse Gemini bodied Volvo B7TLs with a two tone purple and orange livery, USB charging, and free WiFi on board.

It was announced in spring 2023 that the Pendle Wizz was to be withdrawn due to low passenger numbers. The last day of service was on 15 April 2023.

=== Ribble Country ===
The Ribble Valley local services were retendered in 2021, and Transdev won multiple tenders for these routes. To operate the routes, they invested in a fleet of 18 Mellor minibuses for use on these tendered routes in and around Colne, Nelson, Burnley and Clitheroe. These routes were supplemented by funding from Lancashire County Council.

In 2023, they were put up for retendering again, and Transdev operated their last services on the Ribble Country network on 15 April 2023.

=== CityZap Manchester ===
In November 2017, a limited-stop express service running directly between Leeds and Manchester via the M62 was introduced, branded as CityZap. Similar to the other CityZap service between York and Leeds operated by sister company Yorkshire Coastliner, the service aimed to attract motorists and provide a competitive alternative to the railway.

The service was notable for its use of sat-nav equipment to choose the quickest route and avoid congestions.

The service operated with a fleet of four Wright Eclipse Urban 2 bodied Volvo B7RLE vehicles, branded for the route in a silver/red livery, and featured free WiFi and USB charging capabilities.

The service was withdrawn in July 2018, owing to low passenger numbers.

=== Burnley Connect ===
This brand was created in 2015 to provide a new, fresh look for the Burnley local services: routes 1/1A/1B/1C, 2, 4/5, 8/8A and 9. The refresh coincided with the introduction of a fleet of Wright Streetlites in a two tone red and burgundy livery which was similar to the Mainline livery at the time. One of the buses carried a special promotional livery for the local football team.

The Wright Streetlites purchased new for these services have since moved to Rosso and presently operate with the Blackburn Bus Company.

=== Starship ===
In 2006, what was then Transdev Burnley & Pendle rebranded their local routes, investing in a fleet of Cummins-engined Optare Versa buses branded as "Transdev starship" wearing an orange and yellow livery. This brand was created to oversee the bus services in and around Burnley that were not already branded. The Starship branded fleet was added to over the years with two further Optare Versas in 2012 as well as older vehicles including Optare Solos, Dennis Darts and Leyland Olympians. The last Starship branded buses operated in 2015, when another rebrand of the network occurred.

== Fleet and operations ==
=== Depots ===
As of January 2026, the company operates from a single depot in Burnley.

=== Vehicles ===
As of March 2024, the fleet consists of 79 buses. The fleet consists of diesel-powered single and double-deck buses manufactured by Wrightbus, Plaxton, Alexander Dennis and Optare, as well as minibuses manufactured by Mellor.
