= Transdev Blazefield =

Bus operating group in England

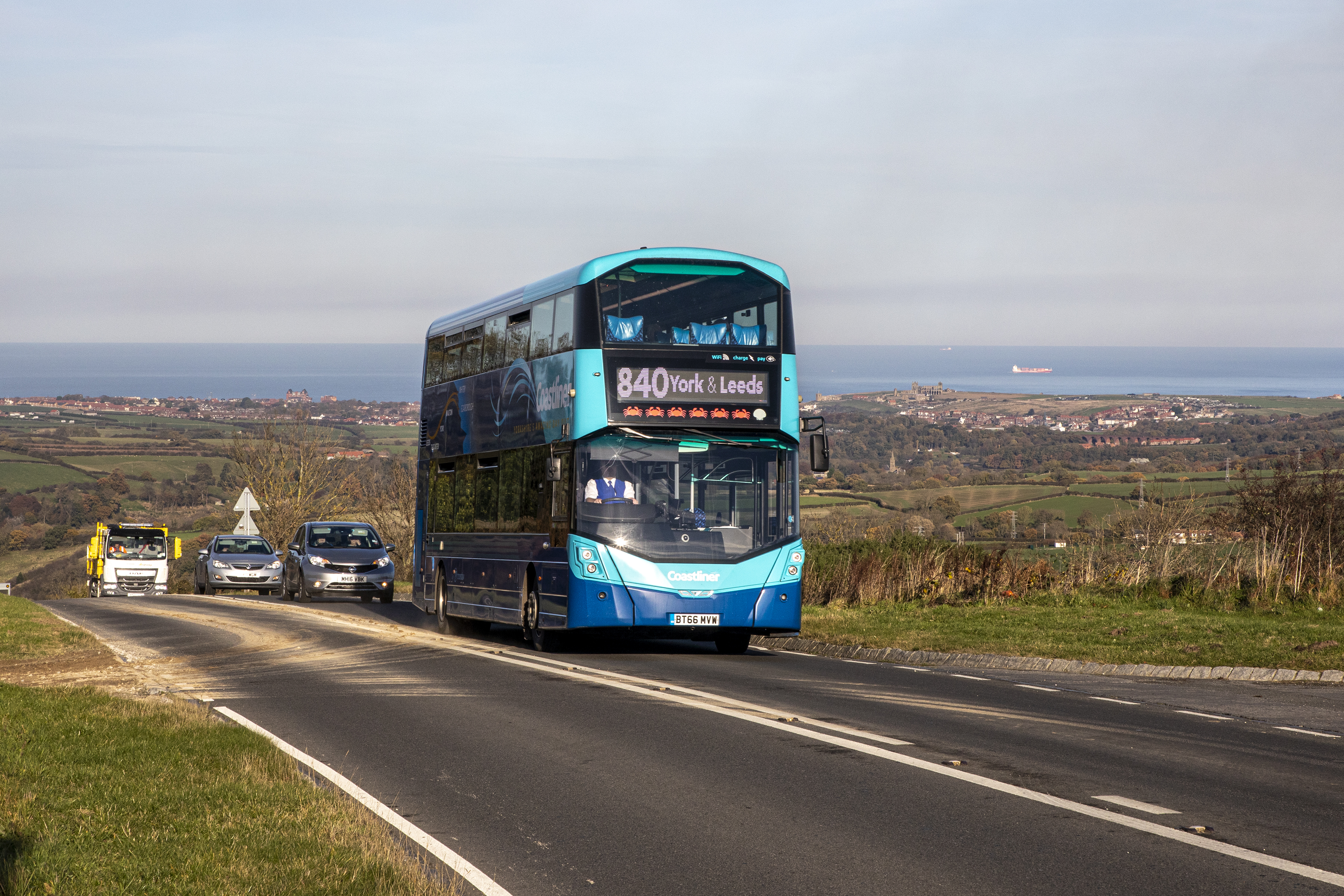
- Transdev Blazefield's flagship Yorkshire Coastliner service in North Yorkshire
- Parent: Transdev
- Founded: August 1991; 34 years ago
- Headquarters: Harrogate, North Yorkshire; England
- Service area: Greater Manchester; Lancashire; North Yorkshire; West Yorkshire
- Service type: Bus and coach
- Depots: 9
- Managing Director: Henri Rohard
- Website: www.transdevbus.co.uk

Transdev Blazefield is a bus group, which operates local and regional bus services across Greater Manchester, Lancashire, North Yorkshire and West Yorkshire, England. Formed in August 1991, the group has been a subsidiary of French-based operator Transdev since January 2006.

== History ==
=== AJS Group ===
In September 1987, West Yorkshire Road Car Company was sold to AJS Group in a management buy-out from the National Bus Company, with the participation of former East Yorkshire Motor Services managing director, Alan Stephenson. In April 1988, AJS acquired London Country North East from the National Bus Company, the last of 72 subsidiaries to be privatised. Prior to the sale, the company was split into two new companies, County Bus & Coach and Sovereign Bus & Coach. (Note: County Bus & Coach was not included in the later sale to Blazefield Group.)

In August 1989, operations in Bradford and Leeds were transferred to Yorkshire Rider. The remaining operations of the former West Yorkshire Road Car Company were subsequently split into smaller companies: Keighley & District, Harrogate & District and York City & District. (Note: Local bus operations within York later became part of First York.) In July 1990, operation of local bus services in York were also transferred to Yorkshire Rider.

AJS also acquired Cambridge Coach Services, which operated coach services from Cambridge, day tours, short breaks and charters. The company began operations on 20 May 1990, following the sale of Premier Travel Services bus operations to Cambus Holdings.

=== Blazefield Group ===
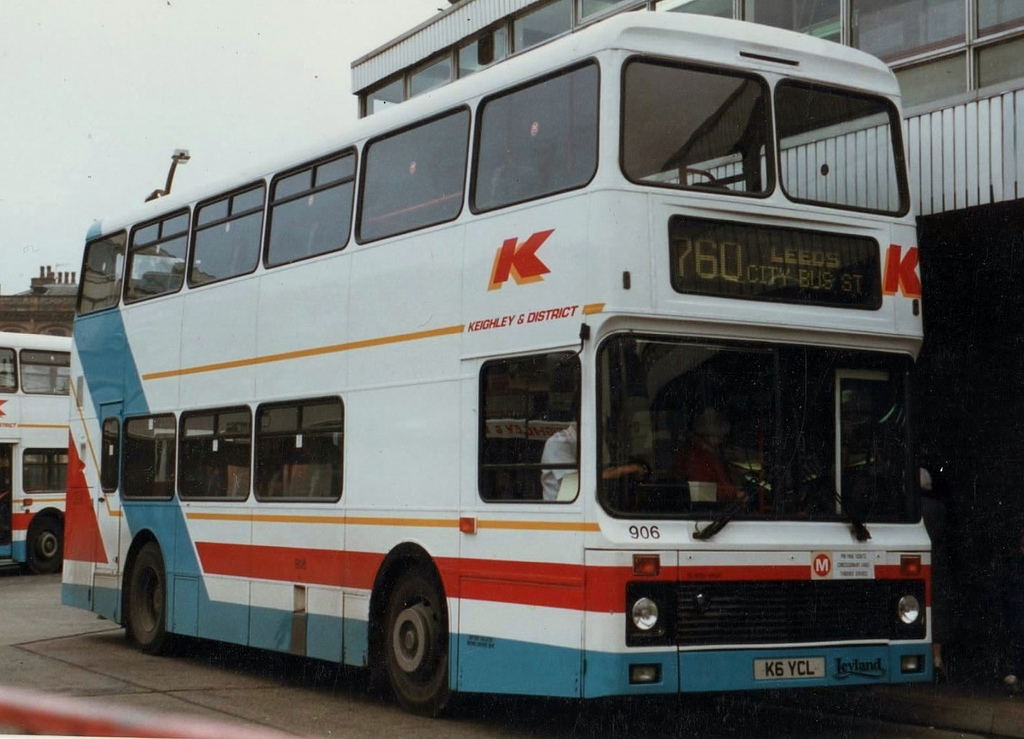
Keighley & District Northern Counties Palatine bodied Leyland Olympian

In August 1991, AJS was sold in a management buyout to a new company, Blazefield Holdings, owned by former directors, Giles Fearnley and Stuart Wilde, in a deal valued at £2.2 million (equivalent to £5,060,000 in 2025). The sale included seven of the company's eight remaining bus firms at the time, as well as 300 vehicles and 12 depots. The sale did not include Cambridge Coach services, although that company continued to be operated by Blazefield Holdings while a buyer was sought between August and November 1991. Initially, there were seven operating subsidiaries: Keighley & District, Harrogate & District, Harrogate Independent Travel, Sovereign Bus & Coach, Sovereign Harrow and Welwyn Hatfield Line.

Following the sale to the Blazefield Group, expansion soon followed, with the purchase of Cambridge Coach Services along with Lucketts of Watford, trading as Luckybus, in November 1991. Ingfield of Settle was purchased in April 1992, and was merged with Keighley-based Northern Rose to form Ingfield–Northern Rose.

In 1986, Harrogate Independent Travel had been set up by a number of West Yorkshire Road Car Company drivers, in a bid to challenge their former employer. The company was subsequently purchased by the AJS Group in April 1989, before being merged with Harrogate & District in 1993. Harrogate & District further expanded in October 1996, following the acquisition of Cowie Group subsidiary United Automobile Services' Ripon operations.

In 1994, Blazefield purchased Borehamwood Travel Services, acquiring a fleet of 22 AEC Routemasters as part of the company's fleet of 43 buses. The company was later renamed London Sovereign. In the same year, Ingfield–Northern Rose purchased Whaites Coaches of Settle. By this time, the group owned around 380 vehicles.

In 1998, Huntingdon & District was created following the purchase of Premier Buses from Julian Peddle. A year later, Cambridge Coach Services was sold to National Express-owned Airlinks in 1999.

In April 2001, the Stagecoach Group sold their Stagecoach North West operations in Blackburn, Bolton and Clitheroe to the Blazefield Group for £13 million (equivalent to £24,405,000 in 2025), which rebranded them as Burnley & Pendle and Lancashire United. In August 2002, the depot in Bolton was sold to Blue Bus and Coach Services.

Over the next three years, Blazefield gradually withdrew from its operations in the south of England. In 2002, London Sovereign was sold to Transdev S.A., with Huntingdon & District sold to Cavalier Travel of Sutton Bridge the following year. In 2004, operations in St Albans were sold to Centrebus. In early 2005, the Competition Commission cleared Blazefield's deal to sell what was left of London Sovereign to Arriva Shires & Essex.

=== Transdev ===
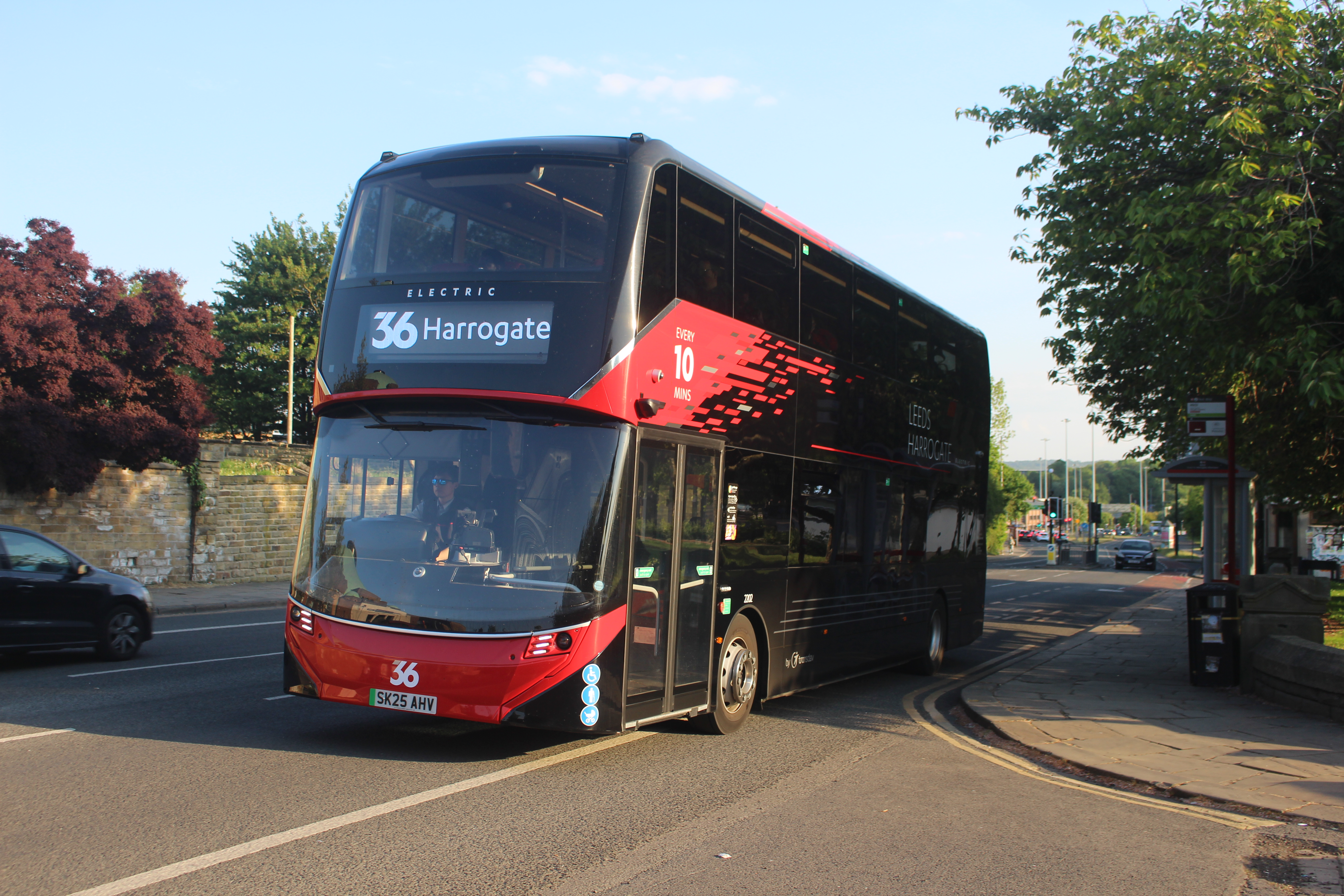
The Harrogate Bus Company's 36, another of Transdev Blazefield's flagship services

In January 2006, French-based operator Transdev acquired the Blazefield Group, along with 305 vehicles.

In August 2006, Blackburn with Darwen Borough Council announced that after 125 years of municipal ownership, Blackburn Transport had been sold to Transdev Blazefield. The sale was finalised in January 2007. Eight months later, Accrington Transport and Northern Blue were acquired, along with the transfer of staff and 65 vehicles.

In August 2008, Top Line Travel and Veolia Transport were purchased, giving the company a further foothold in the York area. The company further expanded in February 2012 following the purchase of York Pullman's local bus operations, including the transfer of 31 staff and 17 vehicles.

Following the granting of approval on 20 December 2017, Rossendale Transport Limited was sold by Rossendale Borough Council on 12 January 2018. The sale saw the company's 240 staff and 102 vehicles join Transdev Blazefield, a move which saw the investment of £3 million in a new fleet of high-specification vehicles for routes in and around Bury, Rochdale and Rossendale.

In August 2020, Transdev took over operation of Leeds Bradford Airport's bus route network from previous operator Yorkshire Tiger, branding the network as Flyer, alongside acquiring their depot in Idle. In April 2021, Transdev agreed terms with Arriva to purchase the remainder of the Yorkshire Tiger operation in West Yorkshire. The sale was completed in July 2021, following which the operation was rebranded Team Pennine, with a two-tone pink livery introduced.

In December 2024, Transdev announced the purchase of the local bus operations of long-established bus operator Reliance Motor Services. The sale included seven routes and eleven vehicles.

== Fleet and operations ==
As of October 2024, Transdev Blazefield has eight operating subsidiaries:

- The Blackburn Bus Company
- The Burnley Bus Company
- Flyer
- The Harrogate Bus Company
- The Keighley Bus Company
- Rosso
- Team Pennine
- Yorkshire Coastliner

The company also operates key routes such as:

- The 36 (Leeds to Harrogate and Ripon)
- Red Express (X41) (Accrington to Manchester)
- The Witch Way (X43) (Burnley to Manchester)
- Coastliner (840 and 843) (Leeds, Tadcaster, York and Malton to Whitby or Scarborough)

The company operates a total of 515 vehicles from ten depots across Yorkshire and the North West of England.
