= Stagecoach North West =

Stagecoach Group subsidiary in North West England

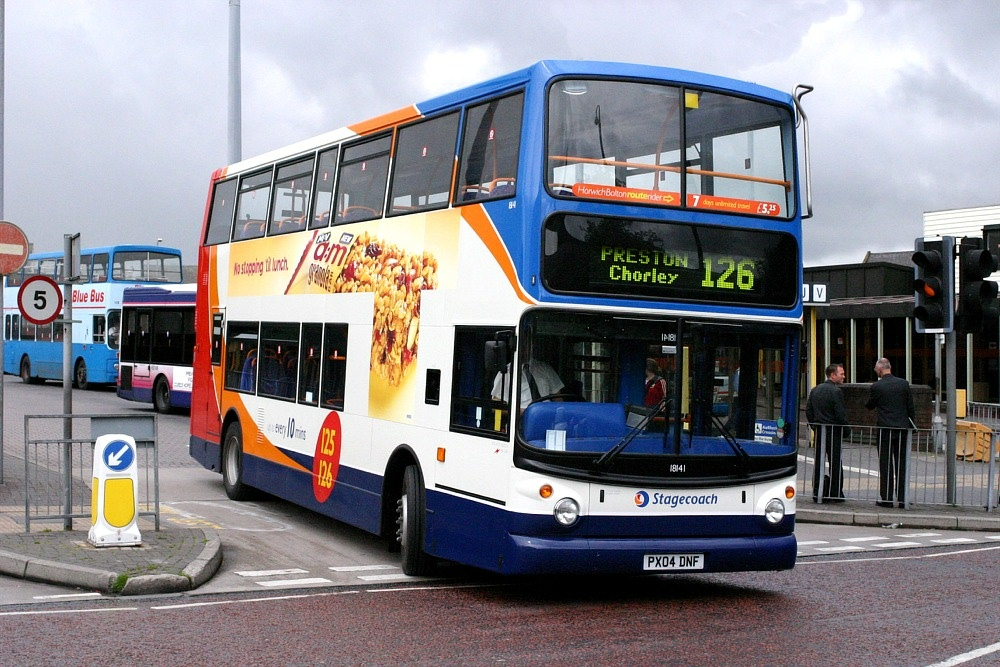
- Stagecoach in Lancashire Alexander ALX400 bodied Dennis Trident 2 at Bolton bus station on Route 126
- Parent: Stagecoach Group
- Founded: 2001; 25 years ago
- Defunct: 2011; 15 years ago (became Stagecoach Cumbria and North Lancashire)
- Headquarters: Carlisle, Cumbria
- Service area: North West England
- Service type: Bus
- Hubs: Carlisle, Chorley, Morecambe, Kendal, Preston
- Depots: 7
- Website: Official website

Stagecoach North West was a major bus operator in North West England. The company was a subsidiary of the Stagecoach Group, and had its origins in the purchase of Cumberland Motor Services in 1987 and Ribble Motor Services in 1988 from the National Bus Company. The head office of Stagecoach North West was in Carlisle. Although the cities of Liverpool and Manchester are in the North West of England, Stagecoach Manchester and Stagecoach Merseyside were run as separate divisions.

== History ==
Stagecoach North West was formed from the company's Cumberland and Ribble operations in late 2000 with the rebranding of the Stagecoach Group. The company consisted of three different operating areas, which were branded Stagecoach in Cumbria, Stagecoach in Lancashire (for services in Chorley and Preston) and Stagecoach in Lancaster. Stagecoach North West also ran several bus services on contract from Cumbria County Council, Lancashire County Council and the Greater Manchester Passenger Transport Authority.

Stagecoach North West was split in September 2011 into Stagecoach Merseyside and South Lancashire and Stagecoach Cumbria and North Lancashire, with the former incorporating Chorley and Preston depots and the Gillmoss depot of Stagecoach Merseyside, and the latter incorporating Barrow, Carlisle, Kendal and Workington depots. After the split, the company, Stagecoach North West Ltd, continues to exist with the trading name Stagecoach Cumbria and North Lancashire.

== Operations ==
=== Stagecoach in Cumbria ===
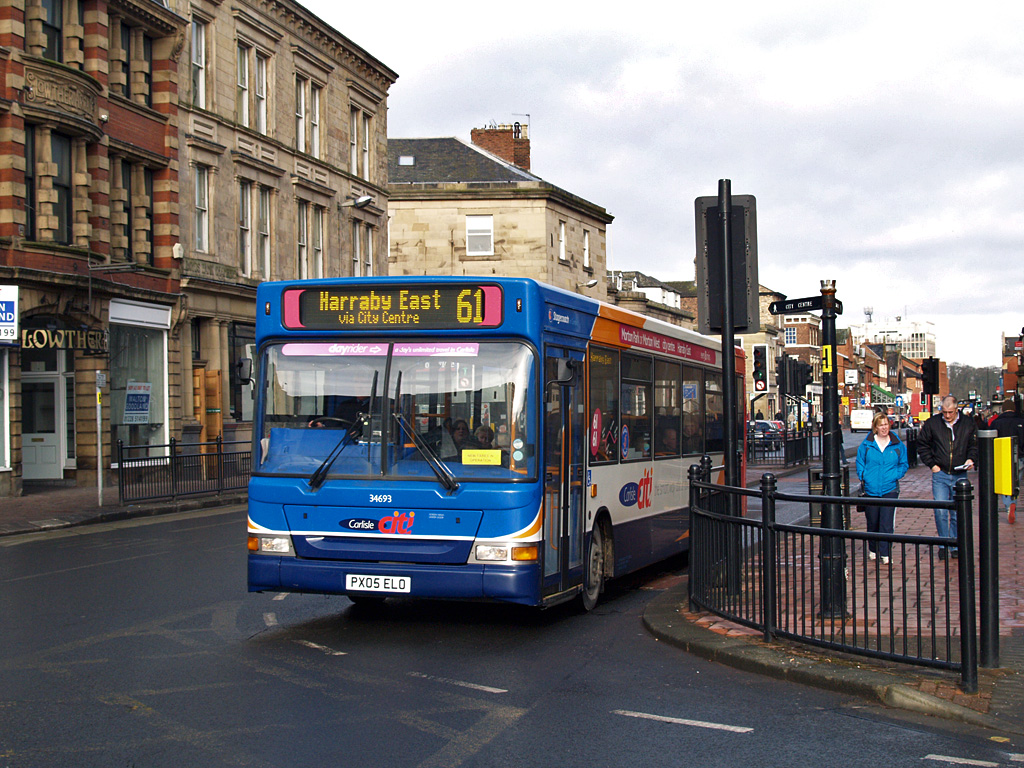
Carlisle Citi-branded Plaxton Pointer 2 bodied Dennis Dart SLF in February 2009

Stagecoach in Cumbria is a trading name of Stagecoach North West Ltd and operates services around the Cumbria area (formerly known as Stagecoach Cumberland, Stagecoach Ribble and Barrow Borough Transport). Operations were based out of depots in Barrow in Furness, Carlisle, Kendal and Workington.

Cumberland Motor Services was one of the first National Bus Company (NBC) subsidiaries to be privatised: this was almost immediately after gaining the Penrith and Carlisle depots from Ribble. The company was bought from the NBC by Stagecoach in July 1987, who split it into two territories: CMS Carlislebus for services within Carlisle itself and CMS Cumberland for the rest of the services; eventually both territories merged with Ribble's south Cumbria services to become Stagecoach Cumberland.

On 11 January 2005, Stagecoach North West's Carlisle depot on Willowholme Road was severely damaged by flooding after nine inches of rain fell in three days, resulting in the River Petteril bursting its banks. The depot was submerged under 4 feet (1.2 m) of floodwater, destroying most of its engineering equipment and resulting in 85 vehicles stored at the depot, including a stored fleet of AEC Routemasters and all but two of Carlisle's 28 low-floor buses, being written off as total losses, with the overall damage costing Stagecoach in Cumbria a total of £2.9 million (equivalent to £5,128,000 in 2025). The Stagecoach Group loaned buses of varying types and ages to Carlisle from across the country to replace the written-off buses, and the following June, 39 new Plaxton Pointer 2 bodied Dennis Dart SLFs were delivered to Carlisle as permanent replacements for the damaged fleet, featuring colour-coded route branding for the new 'Carlisle Citi' network.

Later in 2005, Stagecoach introduced new double-decker buses on its flagship service X35 route between Barrow-in-Furness, Ulverston, Grange-over-Sands and Kendal.

=== Stagecoach in Lancashire ===
Stagecoach in Lancashire was the trading name of Ribble Motor Services Ltd and operated services around the Central Lancashire area, serving Preston and Chorley. The company's previous operations in Blackburn, Hyndburn, Clitheroe and Bolton were sold in April 2001 to the Blazefield Group for £13 million (equivalent to £24,405,000 in 2025), which rebranded them as Lancashire United and Burnley & Pendle. The remainder of operations were mainly based out of Preston at a depot on Selbourne Street.

Stagecoach in Lancashire had many smaller service brands: The Fylde Villager, The Wyre Villager, Network Ribble Valley and Network Chorley. Other services included X2, 125 and 109. In early 2009, Stagecoach lost the contract for some Fylde Villager branded services to Cumfybus and Coastal Coaches, who operate them on behalf of Lancashire County Council.

=== Stagecoach in Preston ===
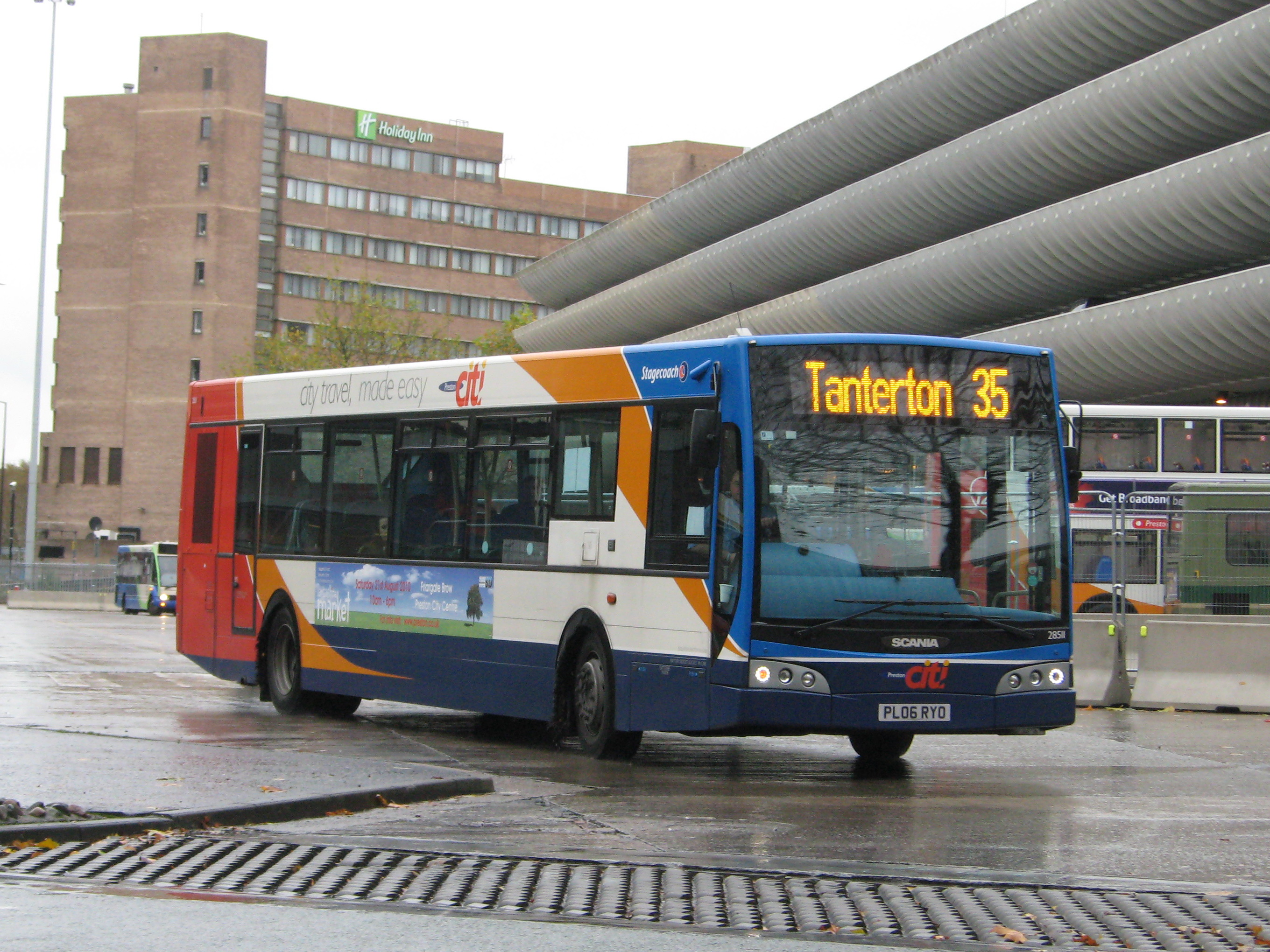
Stagecoach in Preston East Lancs Esteem bodied Scania N94UB at Preston bus station in November 2010

From 2006 to 2009, Preston Bus, the municipally owned operator of bus services in Preston, Lancashire, experienced a period of heavy competition from Stagecoach North West. Competition escalated into a bus war between the operators, with Stagecoach offering lower fares on the busiest routes.

On 23 January 2009, Preston Bus was to Stagecoach North West, ending over 100 years service of Preston Bus to the city. In March 2009, the company would be rebranded to Stagecoach Preston Bus. The company under Stagecoach operated routes within the City of Preston, its suburbs (e.g., South Ribble, Longridge, Chipping) and the surrounding area, all based from a single depot on Deepdale Road.

On 19 January 2011, Stagecoach in Preston was sold to Rotala Group, who would reinstate the Preston Bus name as a subsidiary operation of the group.

=== Stagecoach in Lancaster ===
Stagecoach in Lancaster Alexander bodied Leyland Olympian in March 2006

Stagecoach in Lancaster operates services in Lancaster, Morecambe, and the surrounding area, including the services between Morecambe/Lancaster and Preston/Blackpool. It is a trading name of Stagecoach North West Ltd, and consists of the former Stagecoach Ribble services in the area combined with those formerly operated by Lancaster City Transport, the local municipal bus operator whose assets were acquired by Stagecoach in May 1993.

A majority of Stagecoach in Lancaster services operated mainly from a depot in White Lund, Morecambe; there is also an outstation at Catterall. The former outstation at Ingleton closed when Stagecoach withdrew the 80/81 services to Ingleton and Kirkby Lonsdale.
