= Transdev Northern Blue =

Former bus operator in England

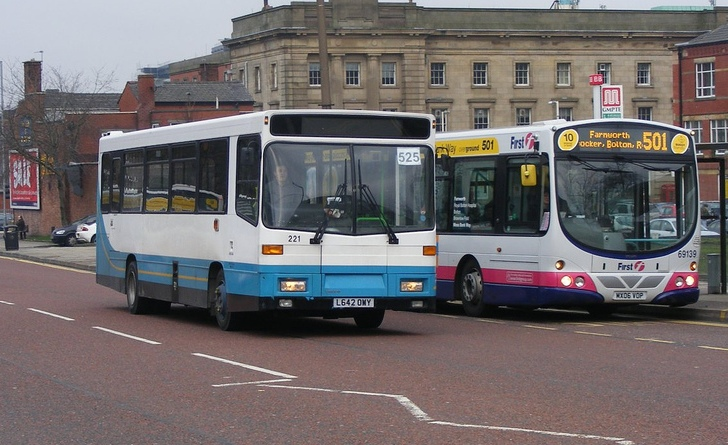
- Alexander Dash bodied Volvo B6 in Bolton in January 2008
- Parent: Transdev Blazefield
- Founded: 15 November 1999
- Ceased operation: 31 August 2009
- Headquarters: Burnley
- Service type: Bus operator
- Website: www.northernblue.co.uk

Transdev Northern Blue was a bus operator operating around Burnley between July 1999 and August 2009.

== History ==
Northern Blue was formed by two former employees of Blackburn Transport. It began operating on 15 November 1999, in competition with Blackburn Transport (BBT) from a base in Oswaldtwistle. After two months fierce competition on BBT's mainline, service 346 (now spot on route 1) operating between Accrington and Darwen via Blackburn, Northern Blue sold out their initial business to BBT, and began to concentrate on school contracts and some coaching work.

In August 2000, the Status Group, which traded in the Lancashire area as Border Buses, decided to pull out of the area. It operated from a base in Burnley. Having already won some contracted service work in the Burnley area, Northern Blue acquired the Border Buses and Viscount Central businesses from the Stratus Group and took over its base at Dean Mill. Northern Blue dropped the Border Buses name, but kept the Viscount Central name going for a number of years.

The bus side of the business continued to trade as Northern Blue and was expanded greatly. A number of local bus services and school contracts have been operated, mainly on behalf of Lancashire County Council.

The coaching unit and the Viscount Central name were sold in September 2005 to the Coach Centre, Accrington.

Northern Blue operated a large number of school contracts for Lancashire County Council as well as some commercial and non-commercial service work and through associated company Lancashire County Transport trading as Accrington Transport, operated a network of routes in the Hyndburn, Clitheroe, Burnley, Nelson and Bolton areas.

On 5 August 2007, Northern Blue Buses and Accrington Transport were purchased by Transdev Blazefield and rebranded Transdev Northern Blue. On 1 September 2009, Transdev Northern Blue was integrated into Transdev in Burnley & Pendle.
