= Rosso (bus company) =

Transdev-owned bus operator

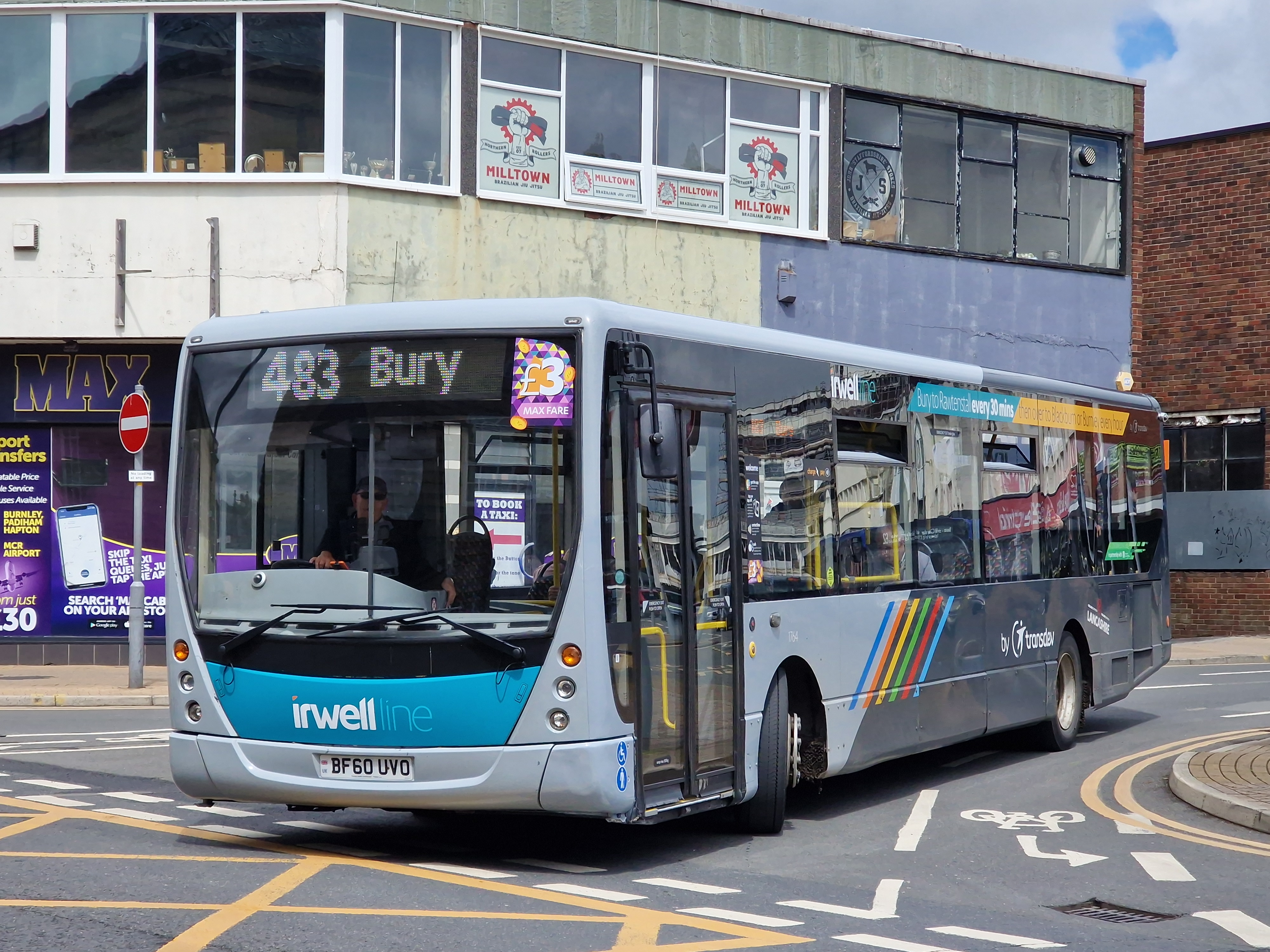
- Plaxton Centro bodied Volvo B7RLE in Irwell Line branding in Burnley in May 2025
- Parent: Transdev Blazefield
- Founded: December 1907; 118 years ago
- Defunct: 30 November 2025; 11 months ago
- Headquarters: Harrogate, North Yorkshire; England
- Service area: Greater Manchester; Lancashire; West Yorkshire
- Service type: Bus
- Routes: 5
- Fleet: 27 (April 2024)
- Managing Director: Henri Rohard
- Website: transdevbus.co.uk/rosso/

Rossendale Transport Limited, trading as Rosso, was a bus operator providing local services in Greater Manchester, Lancashire and West Yorkshire, England. It was a subsidiary of Transdev Blazefield, which operates bus services across Greater Manchester, Lancashire, North Yorkshire and West Yorkshire.

== History ==
The company's history dates back to December 1907, when both Haslingden Corporation Transport and Rawtenstall Corporation Transport first ran a motor bus within their boroughs. In 1968, the two undertakings merged to form the Rossendale Joint Transport Committee. Following local government reorganisation in April 1974, the boroughs were merged, along with nearby Bacup and Whitworth, forming the present-day Borough of Rossendale.

In 1986, as part of the deregulation of bus services and to comply with the Transport Act 1985, the company's assets were transferred to a new legal entity named Rossendale Transport. The company expanded over the following twenty years, operating local buses in Bury, Rochdale and Rossendale, as well as neighbouring Blackburn, Bolton, Burnley and Todmorden. In September 1990, a new depot was established in Rochdale, in order to support new routes introduced in the town following the deregulation of bus services.

In September 2008, the company's main depot and office facilities were moved from Rawtenstall to Haslingden, with the former buildings subsequently demolished.

In early 2009, concerns were raised about the council's intentions, in relation to their continued ownership of the company. It culminated in a public protest outside Rawtenstall Town Hall, with the aim of dissuading Rossendale Borough Council from selling. In July 2009, the council announced that it was retaining its ownership of the company, with an acceptable valuation not having been met by any potentially interested parties.

=== Rebrand and sale to Transdev ===
In August 2013, the network was rebranded, with a new livery design of red, orange, yellow and white. At the same time, the company was renamed Rosso.

Following the granting of approval on 20 December 2017, the company was sold by Rossendale Borough Council on 12 January 2018. The sale saw the company's 240 staff and 102 vehicles join Transdev Blazefield – a move which saw the investment of £3 million in a new fleet of high-specification vehicles for routes in and around Bury, Rochdale and Rossendale.

In April 2018, the company's Haslingden depot, which opened ten years earlier, was closed. Staff and vehicles were reassigned within the business to nearby depots across Lancashire.

=== Demise ===
On 25 March 2024, as part of Tranche 2 of the Bee Network bus franchising rollout, Rosso's last-remaining Rochdale depot and its services, with the exception of the 464 and the Irwell Line 481 and 483, were acquired by First Manchester. Most vehicles and drivers were transferred either to the Blackburn Bus Company or the Burnley Bus Company. Over a year later on 30 November 2025, all remaining Rosso services – the 464, 481 and 483 – were transferred to the Blackburn and Burnley Bus Company, bringing an end to Rosso's operations after 117 years.

== Services and branding ==
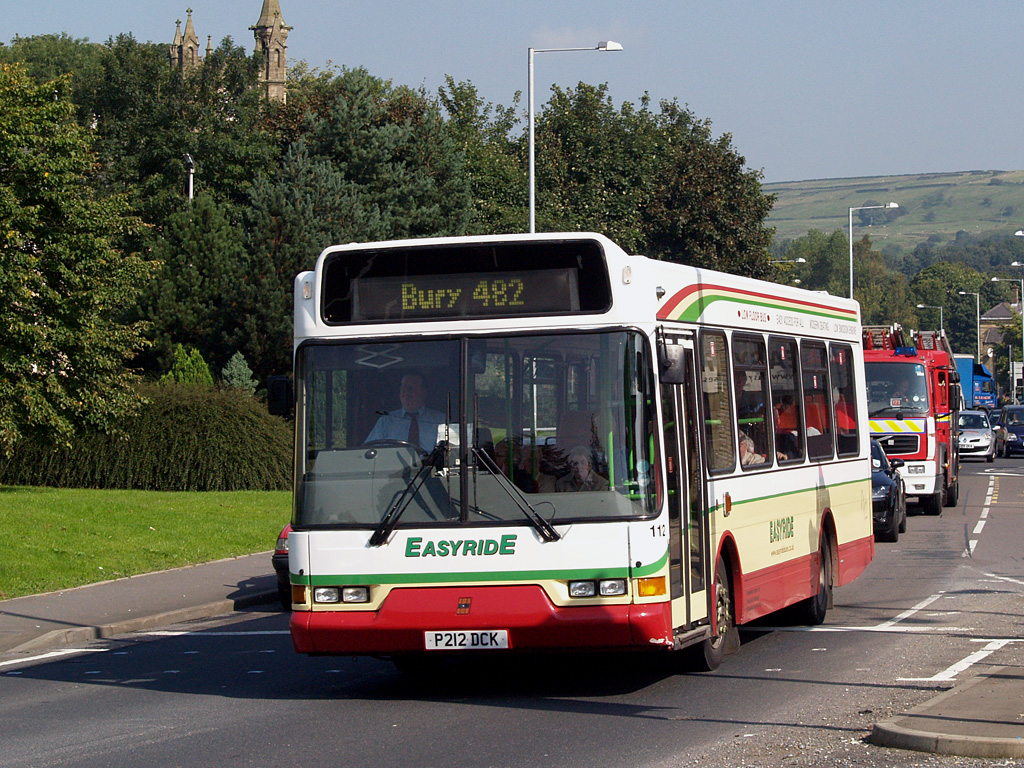
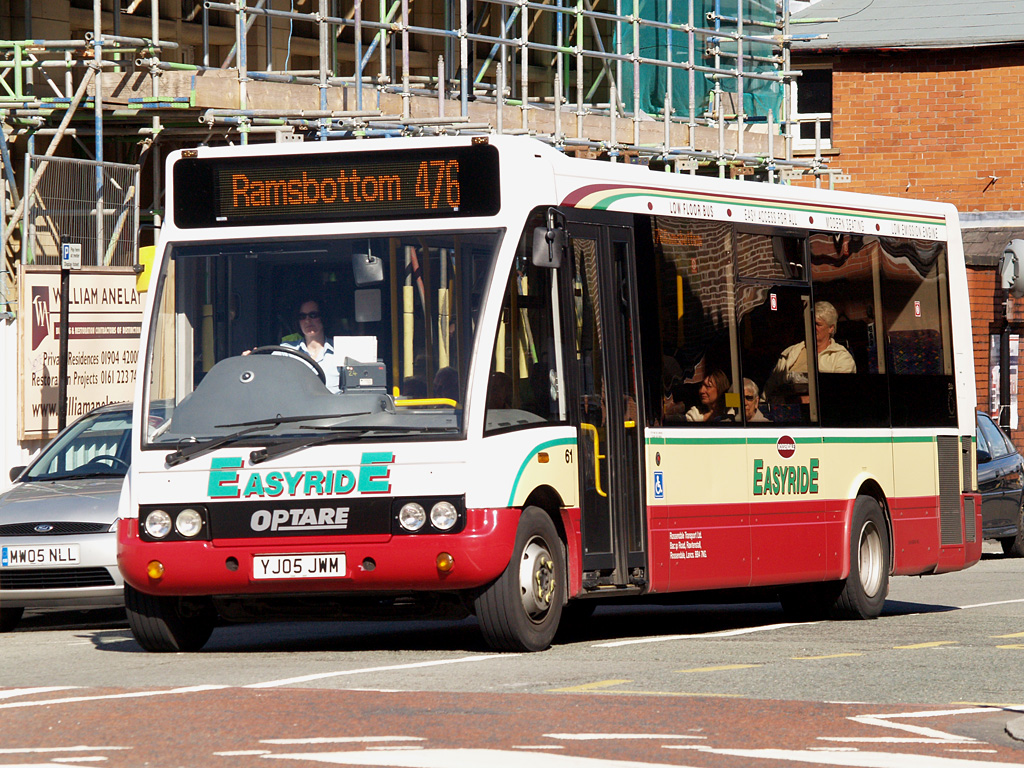
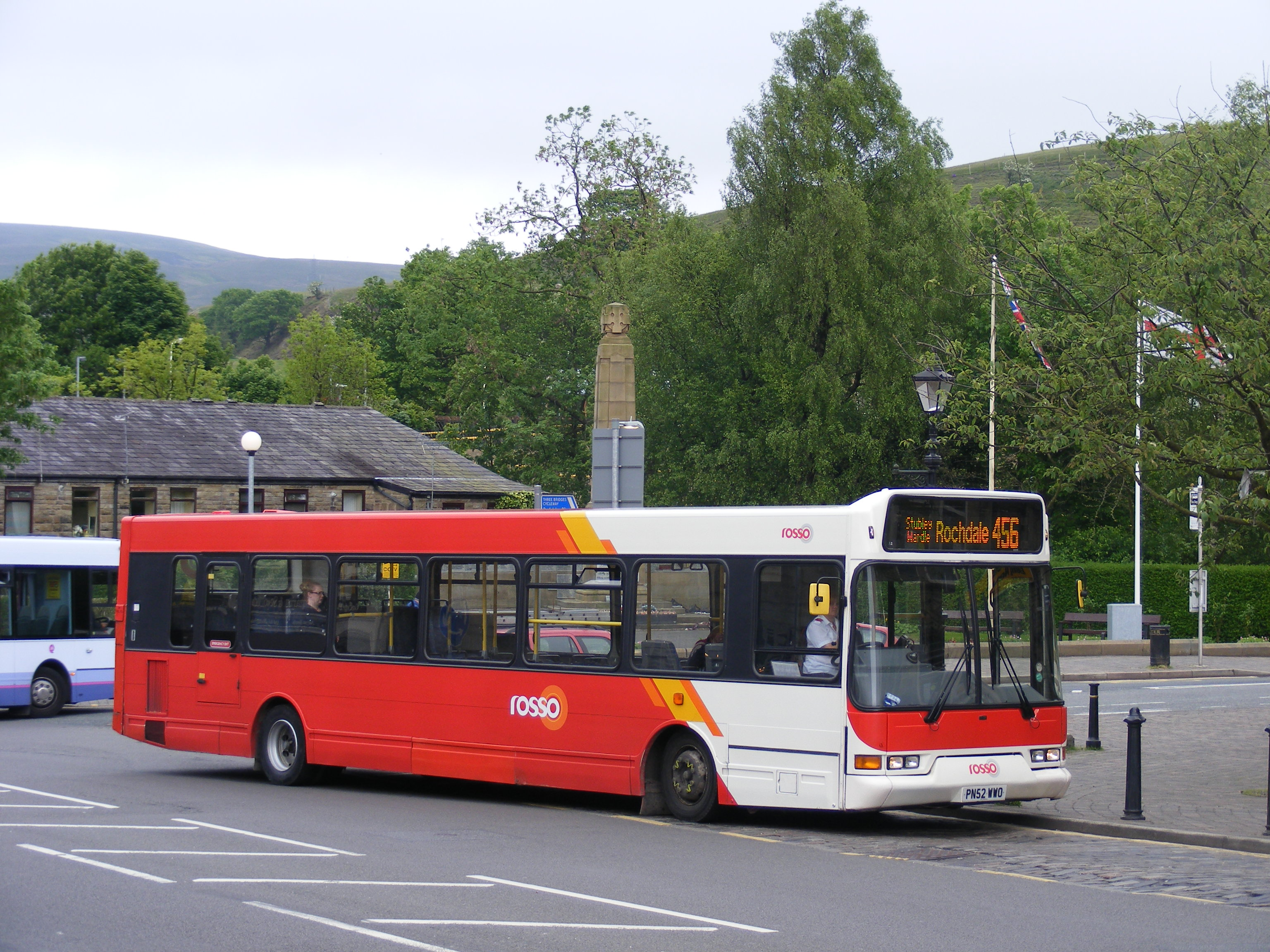
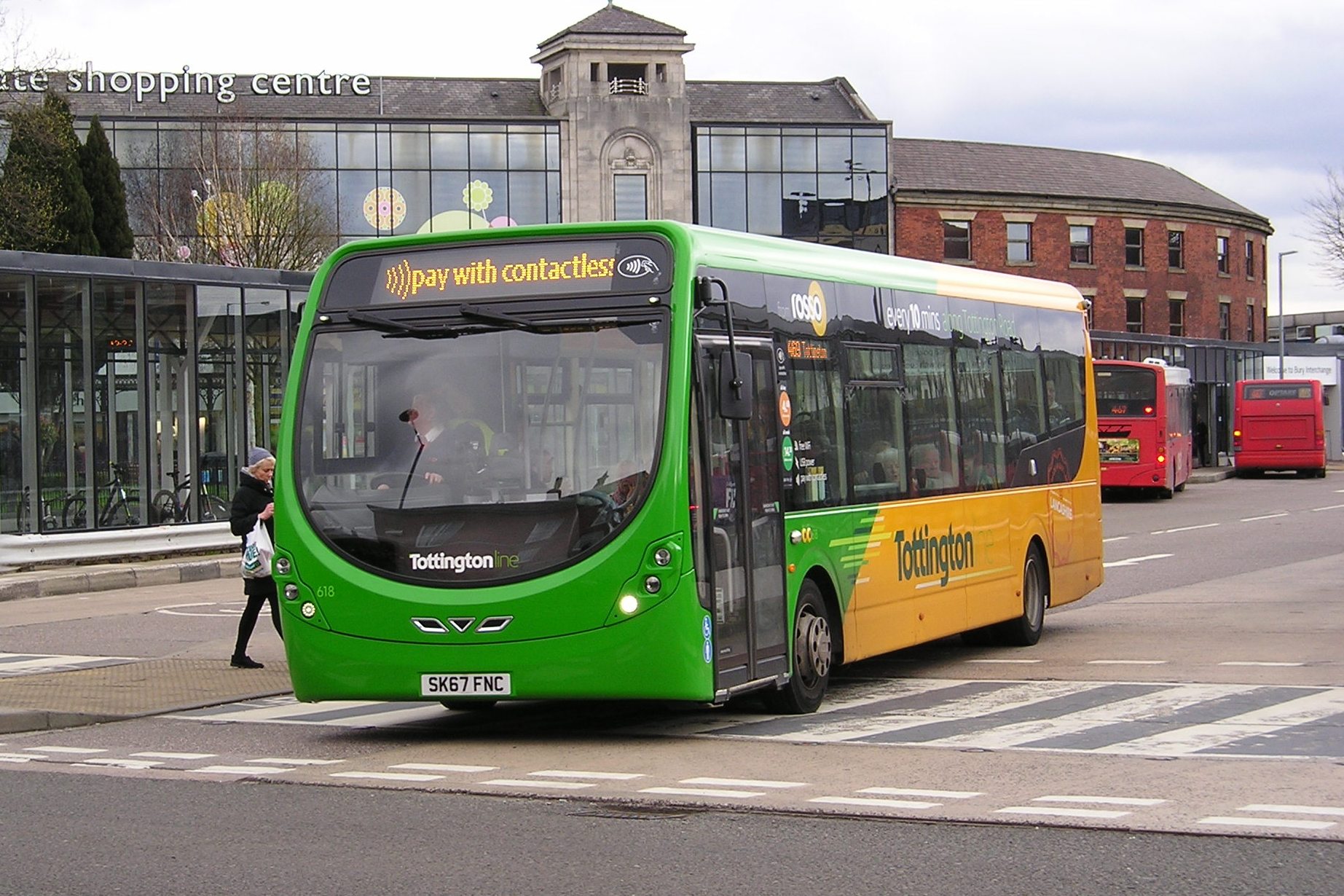
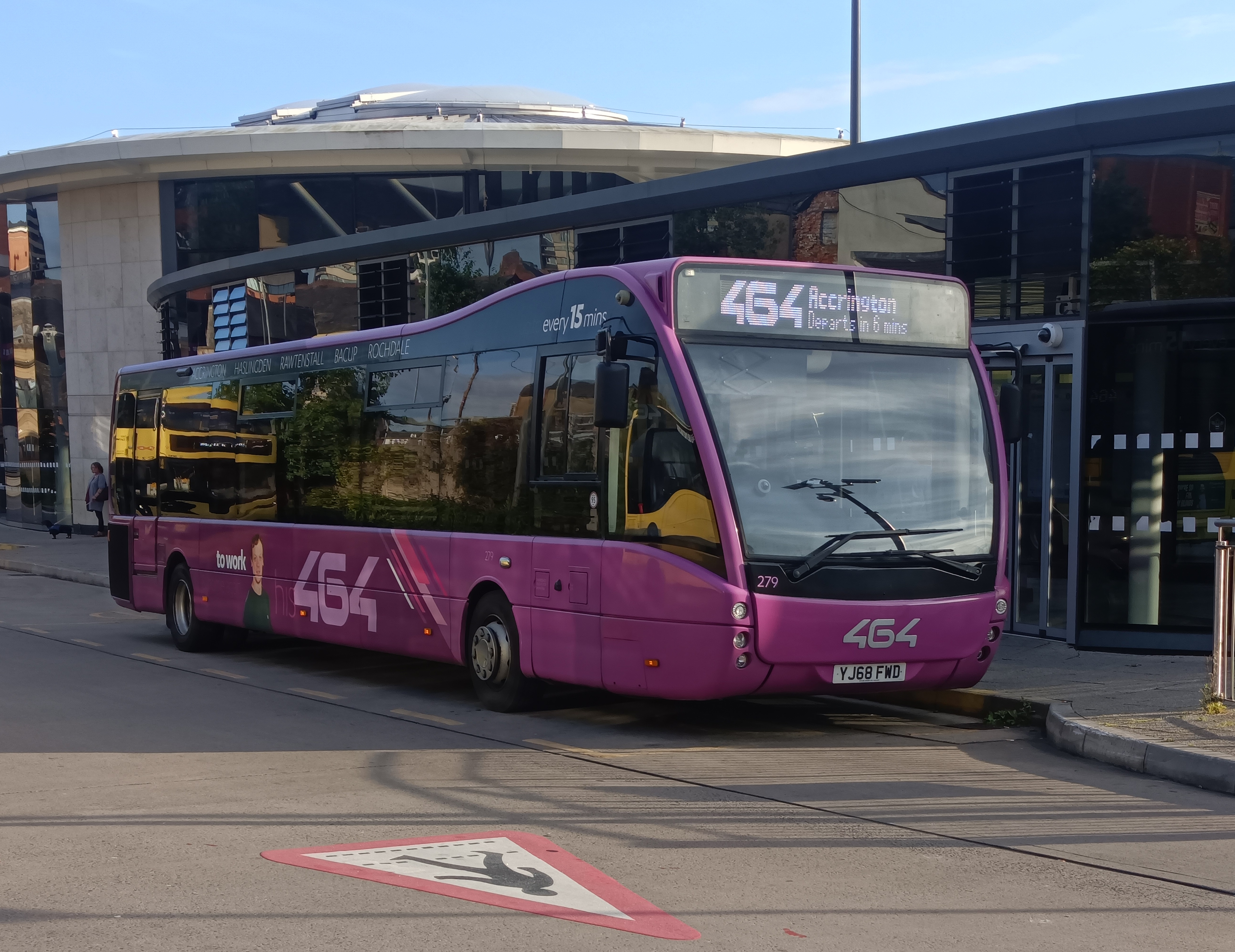
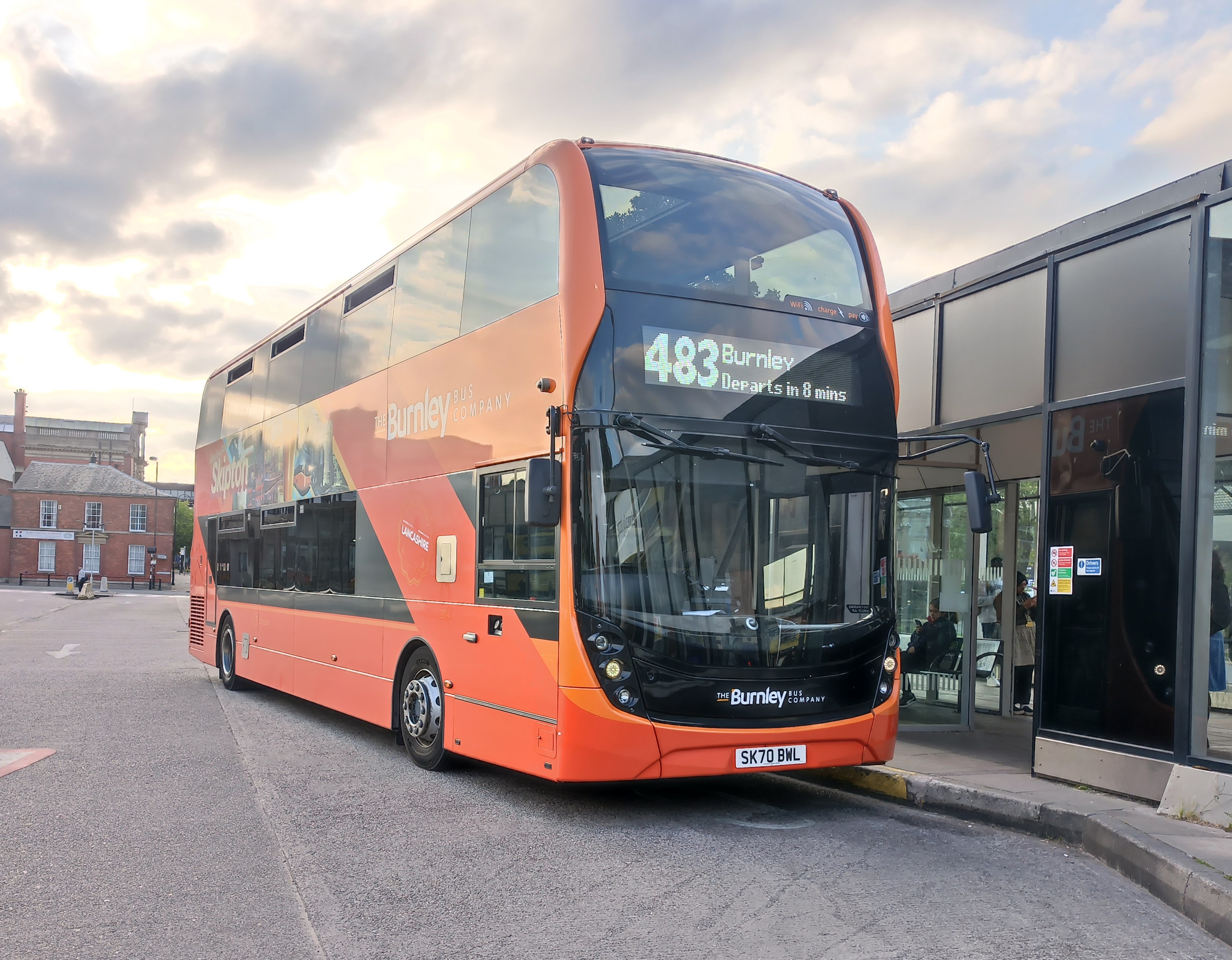
Branding: past and present

=== 464 ===
Route 464 operated between Accrington and Rochdale via Rawtenstall up to every 15 minutes, with a half-hourly frequency during the evening and on Sunday. This route was operated by a fleet of Optare Versa single-deck vehicles branded in a two-tone purple and pink livery. Features included free WiFi, USB and wireless charging and audio-visual next stop announcements. On 30 November 2025, this route was transferred to the Blackburn Bus Company.

=== Irwell Line ===
The Irwell Line brand encompassed two routes, which operated along the Irwell Valley. The routes operated between Blackburn (481) or Burnley (483) and Bury via Rawtenstall. Services were operated by a fleet of Plaxton Centro bodied Volvo B7RLE single-deck vehicles, branded in a two-tone black and grey livery. Features include free WiFi, USB charging and audio-visual next stop announcements. On 30 November 2025, these routes was transferred to the Burnley Bus Company.

=== Trax ===
'Trax' branded services came with two routes, the 467 and 468. Both routes began at Rochdale Interchange and ended at Bury Interchange, with different intermediate stops. A fleet of Wright StreetLites painted in a bright orange livery were allocated onto these routes. These routes were acquired by First Manchester as part of Tranche 2 of the Bee Network rollout across Greater Manchester in March 2024.

=== Tottington Line ===
Tottington Line branded services operated on one route, the 469 between Bury Interchange and Tottington, operated using a fleet of Wright StreetLites painted in an orange and green livery. The route was taken over by Stagecoach Manchester in March 2024 as part of Tranche 2 of the Bee Network rollout.

=== Rossendale Rovers ===
Launched in January 2021, Rossendale Rovers was a brand encompassing a number of local services operating in and around the Rossendale Valley. Services were operated by a fleet of 3 Mellor Strata single-deck vehicles, branded in a two-tone yellow and orange livery. Features included audio-visual next stop announcements. These services were taken over by Vision Bus in October 2024.

== Fleet and operations ==
As of April 2024, the Rosso fleet consisted of 27 diesel-powered single and double-deck buses manufactured by Alexander Dennis, Wrightbus, Plaxton and Optare, as well as minibuses manufactured by Mellor Coachcraft.
