= Blackburn Transport =

Former bus company in Blackburn, England

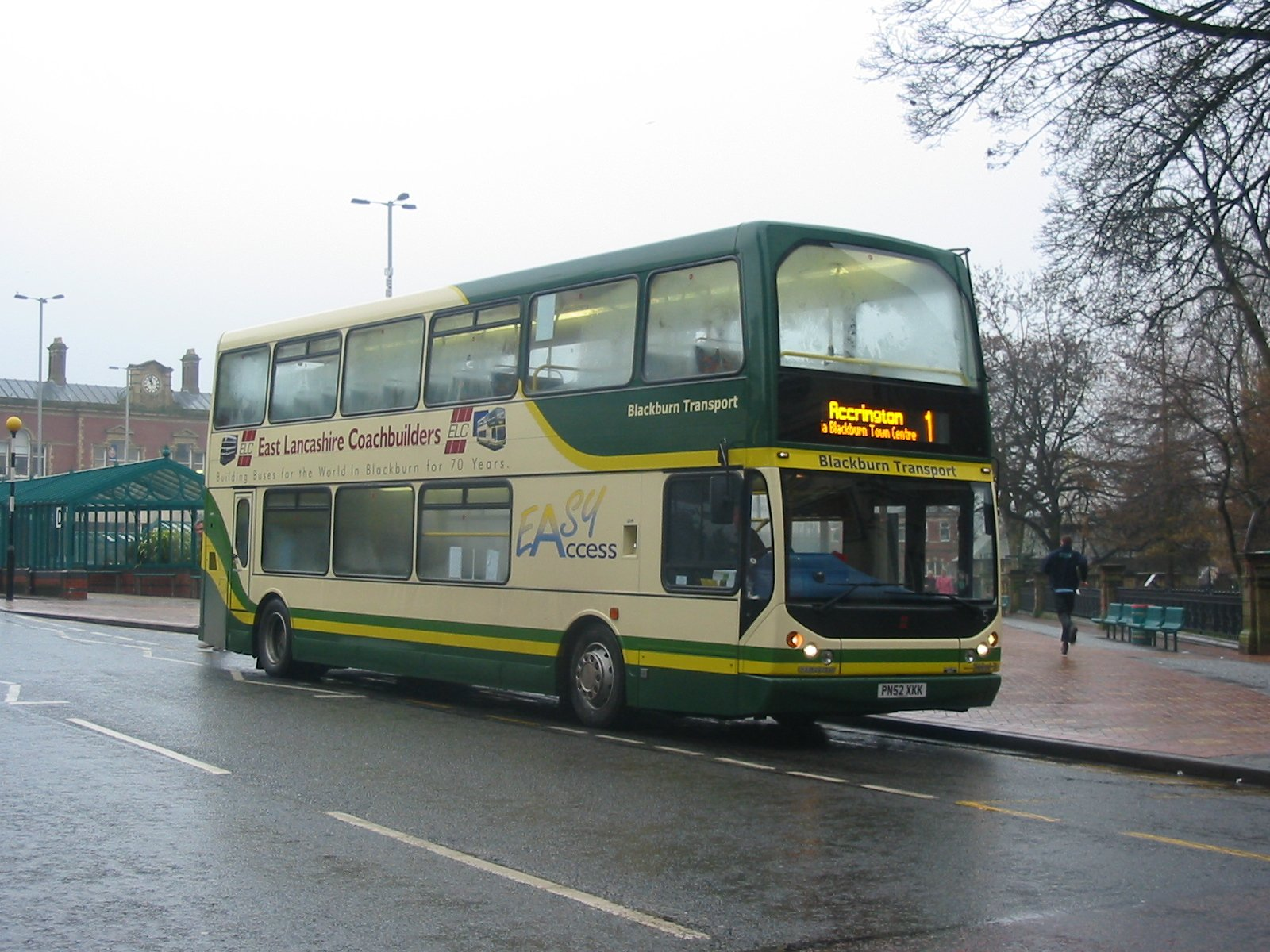
- East Lancs Myllennium Lolyne bodied Dennis Trident 2 in January 2004
- Parent: Blackburn with Darwen Council
- Founded: 1881
- Ceased operation: 22 January 2007
- Headquarters: Blackburn
- Service area: Lancashire
- Service type: Bus operator
- Depots: 1
- Fleet: 124 (August 2006)

Blackburn Transport was a municipal bus company based in Blackburn from 1881 until 2007.

== History ==
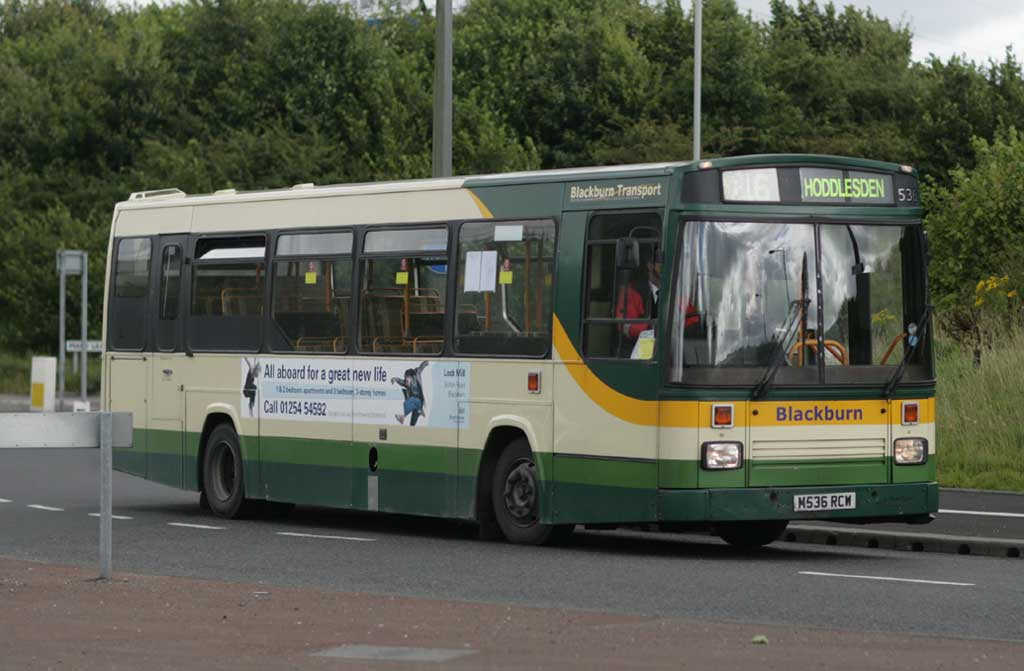
East Lancs bodied Volvo B6R (2008)

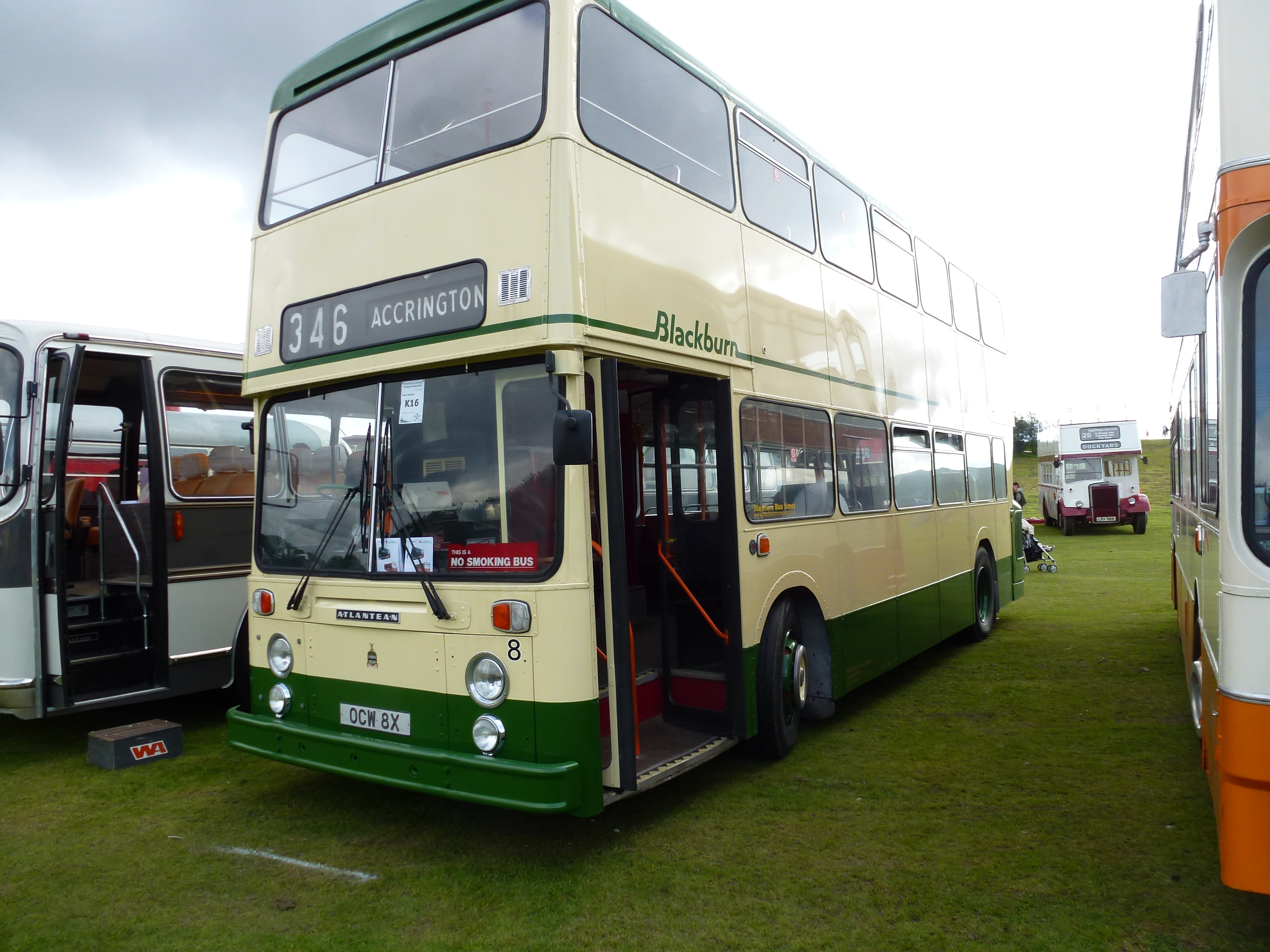
Preserved East Lancs bodied Leyland Atlantean in September 2012

Blackburn Transport's history can be traced back to 1881, when the Blackburn and Over Darwen Tramways Company commenced operating steam trams. From 1898, the routes were operated by Blackburn and Darwen councils. From 1899, work began on converting the network to electric trams. The last route to be electrified was completed on 4 December 1903.

Blackburn's fleet consisted of 48 double deck and 13 single deck trams. Buses started being introduced in 1929, when six routes were put into operation. Twelve vehicles (6 Leyland Tigers and 6 Leyland Titans) were put into service on these routes. Trams and buses operated together for the next 20 years.

The first tramway route was abandoned in favour of buses in 1935, although further plans to put more tramway routes out of action were put on hold due to the interruption of World War II, during which time, tramway maintenance deteriorated markedly. The tram system closed in September 1949.

Blackburn Corporation purchased 83 new buses to replace the defunct trams, and, as a result, it was a further seven years before any more new buses were required. From 1974, due to a re organisation within the local government, the company became known as Borough of Blackburn Transport.

The livery changed from being predominantly green to green at the bottom, then white and also a red roof, recalling the predominant colour of neighbouring Darwen Transport, which Blackburn had absorbed. As a result, they were given the nickname of 'Italian flag'. Twelve Leyland Atlanteans were the first vehicles to receive this new livery, a model of bus that would become a predominant feature of the fleet.

In 1983, the livery changed again. The 'traditional all green livery' style was brought back.

To comply with the Transport Act 1985, the Borough of Blackburn's bus operations were transferred to a separate company. The livery underwent yet another change, with the predominantly green scheme being split by white stripes around the windows. Also in this year, the company began operating holiday trips under the Blackburn Coachlines brand.

In 1990, an all cream coloured, with dark green bands livery was introduced. At this time, the fleet was beginning to show its age, with the major part of the company's vehicles still being made up of Leyland Atlanteans, although some of the older buses had been replaced by 26 new MCW Metroriders in the end of the 1980s.

Second hand buses and some new models were bought consistently from 1999, although intake slowed again after 2005, due to falling profits.

In 2002, the MetroNetwork was introduced. This offered passengers a simpler view of the services network, known as 'tracks', and the fare structure was also amended, with the introduction of many fare-saving schemes. Some buses were given overall advertising to promote these features.

In 2003, the Blackburn Coachlines operation ceased. Also, the new Schools + services were introduced. These buses, mainly Eastern Coach Works bodied Leyland Olympians were given a predominantly yellow livery, but with green relief. They were in full operation by August 2004.

The first introduction of route branded vehicles came in 2006, with the renaming of the old outer circle service the 'OC'. Two double decker buses were given a new orange, purple and yellow livery, and in a similar fashion to what Lancashire United have done, created a new, separate website for the service.

=== Takeover ===
On 16 August 2006, Blackburn with Darwen Council announced that after 125 years of municipal ownership, Blackburn Transport had been sold to Transdev Blazefield which, following a number of delays, took place on 22 January 2007, with Blackburn Transport integrated into Lancashire United.

== Fleet ==
As at August 2006, the fleet comprised 124 buses.

== Garage ==
Blackburn Transport operated out of a garage in Intack, Blackburn, with six buses out stationed on the Fylde coast.
