= Blackburn Bus Company =

Transdev-owned bus operator

The Blackburn Bus Company

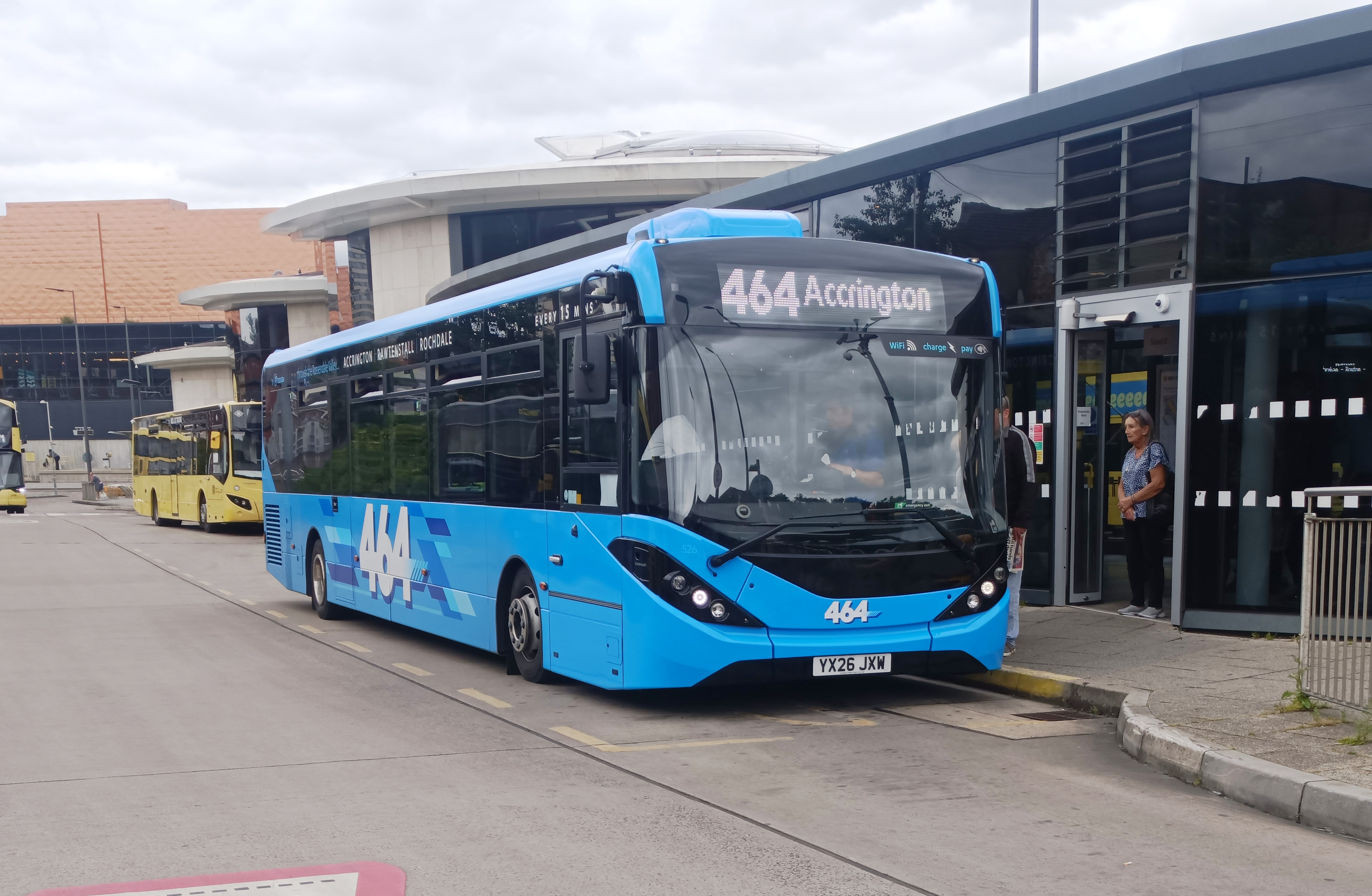
- Alexander Dennis Enviro200 MMC on route 464 in Rochdale Interchange in June 2026
- Parent: Transdev Blazefield
- Founded: April 2001; 25 years ago
- Headquarters: Blackburn, Lancashire; England
- Service area: Greater Manchester; Lancashire
- Service type: Bus
- Stations: Blackburn Bus Station
- Depots: 1
- Fleet: 63 (October 2024)
- Managing Director: Henri Rohard
- Website: transdevbus.co.uk/the-blackburn-bus-company/

The Blackburn Bus Company operates both local and regional bus services in Greater Manchester and Lancashire, England. It is a subsidiary of Transdev Blazefield, which operates bus services across Greater Manchester, Lancashire, North Yorkshire and West Yorkshire.

== History ==
In April 2001, Stagecoach sold their operations in Blackburn, Bolton and Clitheroe to the Blazefield Group, which rebranded them as Burnley & Pendle and Lancashire United. The sale was valued at £13 million. Prior to the sale, many of the newer vehicles purchased following earlier investment by Stagecoach were transferred to other subsidiaries, being replaced by older vehicles.

Following the sale, investment commenced with a fleet of 30 Wright Renown bodied Volvo B10BLE single-deck vehicles introduced into service in September 2001. A number of service revisions followed and many marginal services were withdrawn, with a strategy of developing a network of high-quality trunk routes. Most of the company's contracted services with Lancashire County Council were terminated, with operations transferred to Northern Blue.

In August 2002, the company's depot in Bolton was sold to Blue Bus and Coach Services. The contracted services in Clitheroe were ceased, with the land sold to a housing developer. Operation of the majority of the contracted services in the area was transferred to Northern Blue.

In January 2006, French-based operator Transdev acquired the Blazefield Group, along with 305 vehicles. Unlike other subsidiaries within the group, Lancashire United retained the pre-acquisition name.

In August 2006, Blackburn with Darwen Borough Council announced that after 125 years of municipal ownership, Blackburn Transport had been sold to Transdev Blazefield. The sale was finalised in January 2007.

In August 2007, Accrington Transport and Northern Blue were acquired, along with the transfer of staff and 65 vehicles. This resulted in services in Clitheroe being reacquired by Lancashire United for a second time. However, these services were subsequently withdrawn in June 2008. In September 2009, Transdev Northern Blue was integrated into the Transdev Burnley & Pendle business.

In August 2011, the former Stagecoach Ribble depot in Blackburn (Manner Sutton Street) was closed, with operations subsequently merged with the former Blackburn Transport depot at Intack.

In July 2016, the company was again rebranded, now operating as The Blackburn Bus Company.

== Current services and brands ==
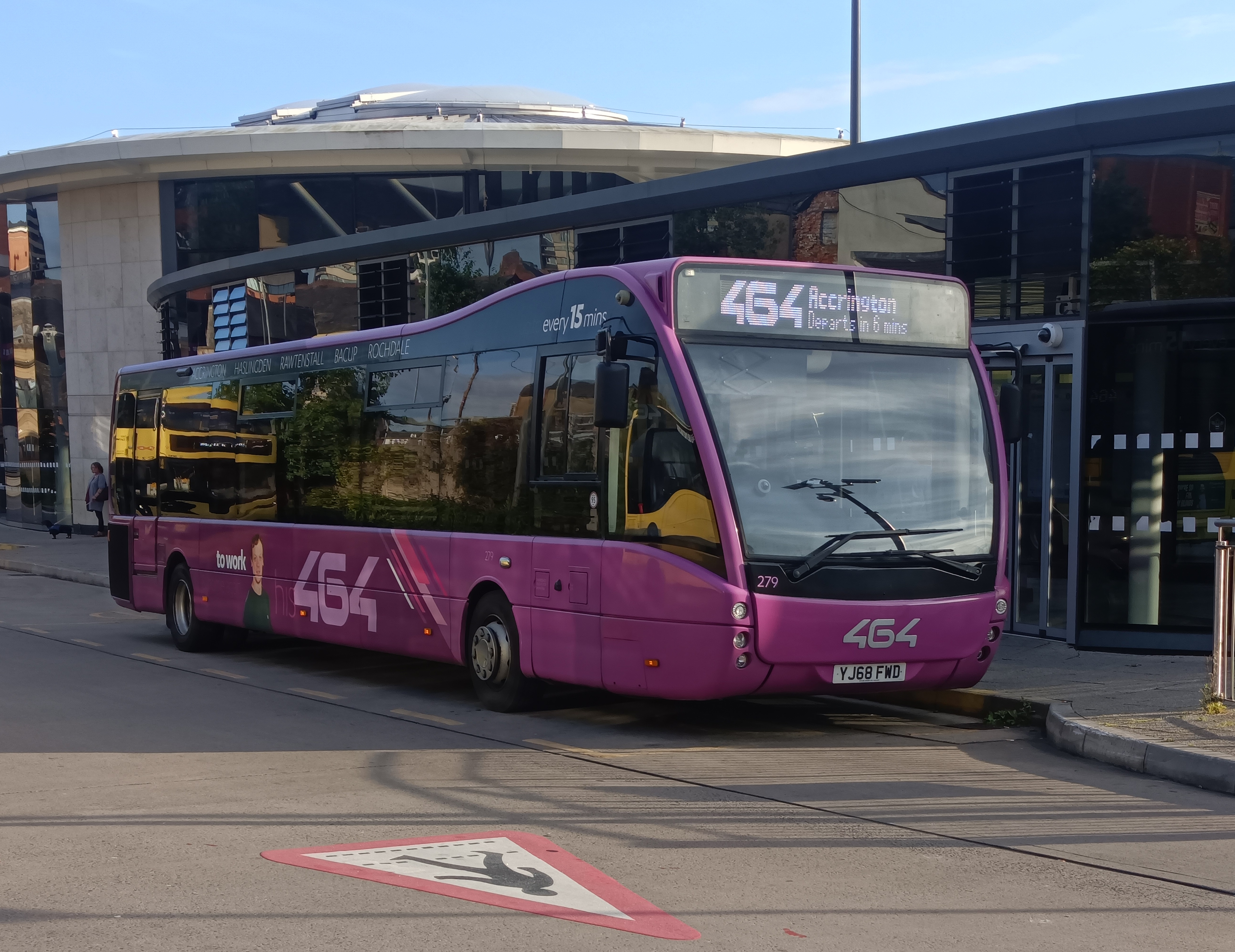
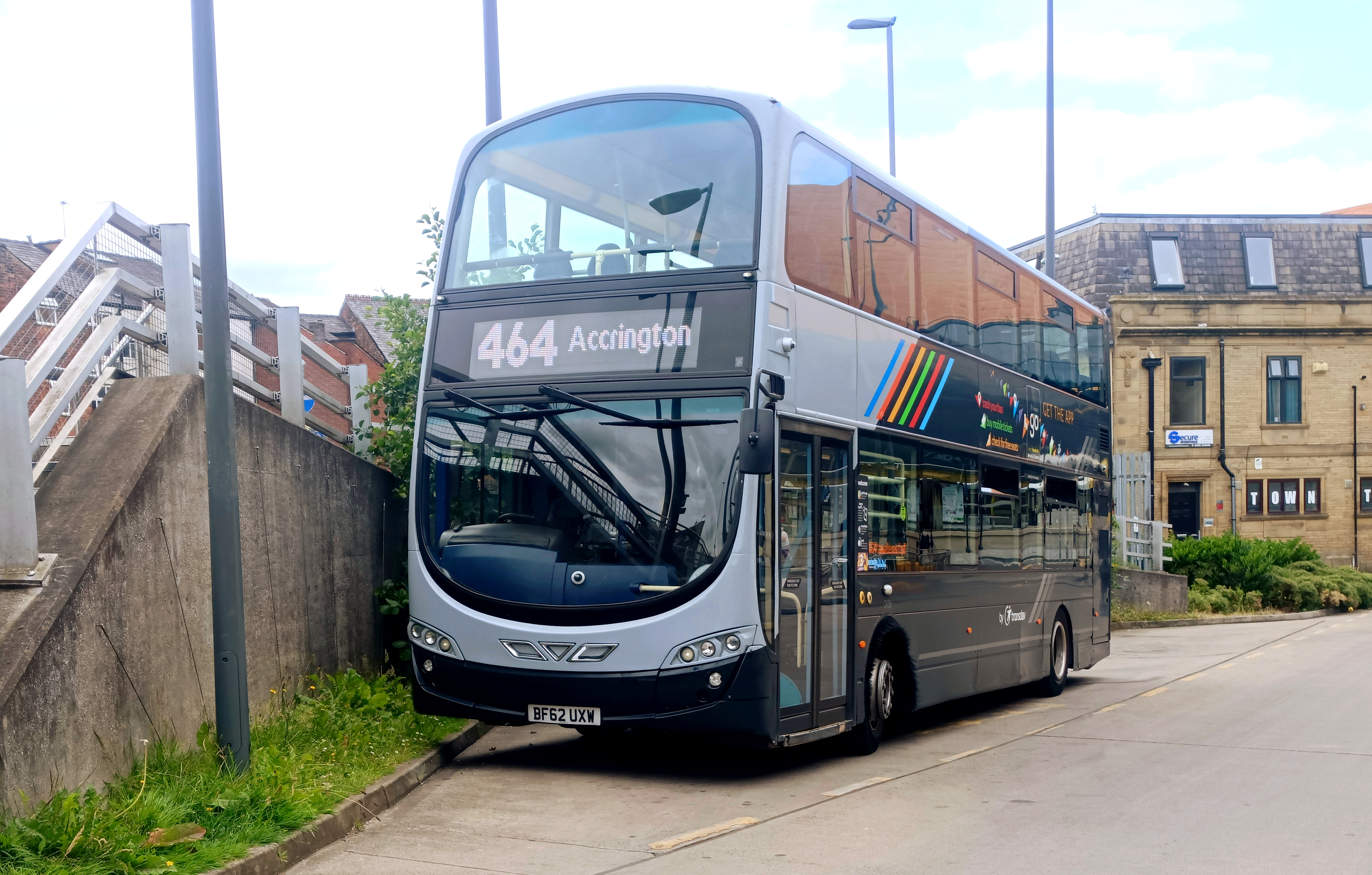
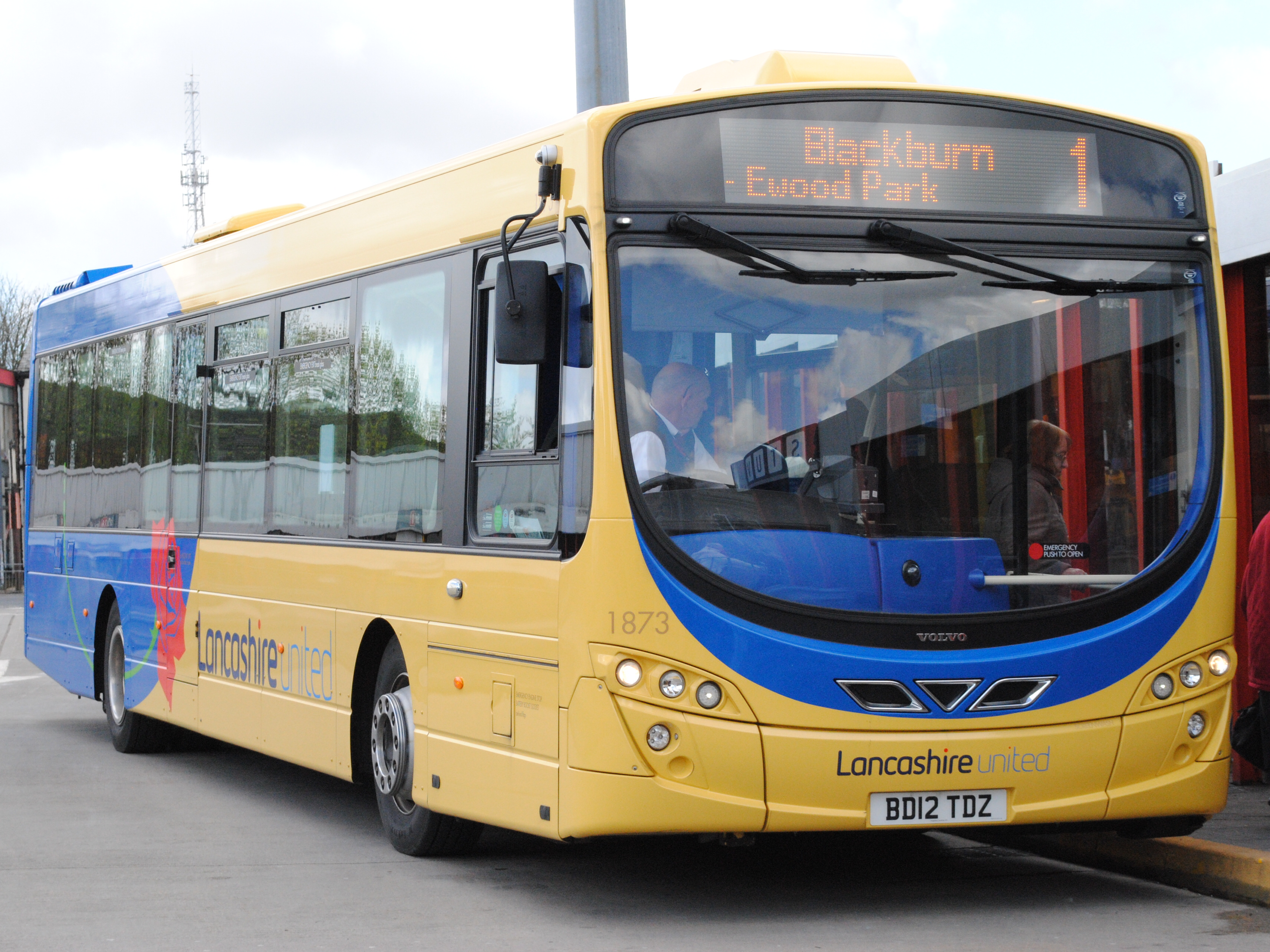
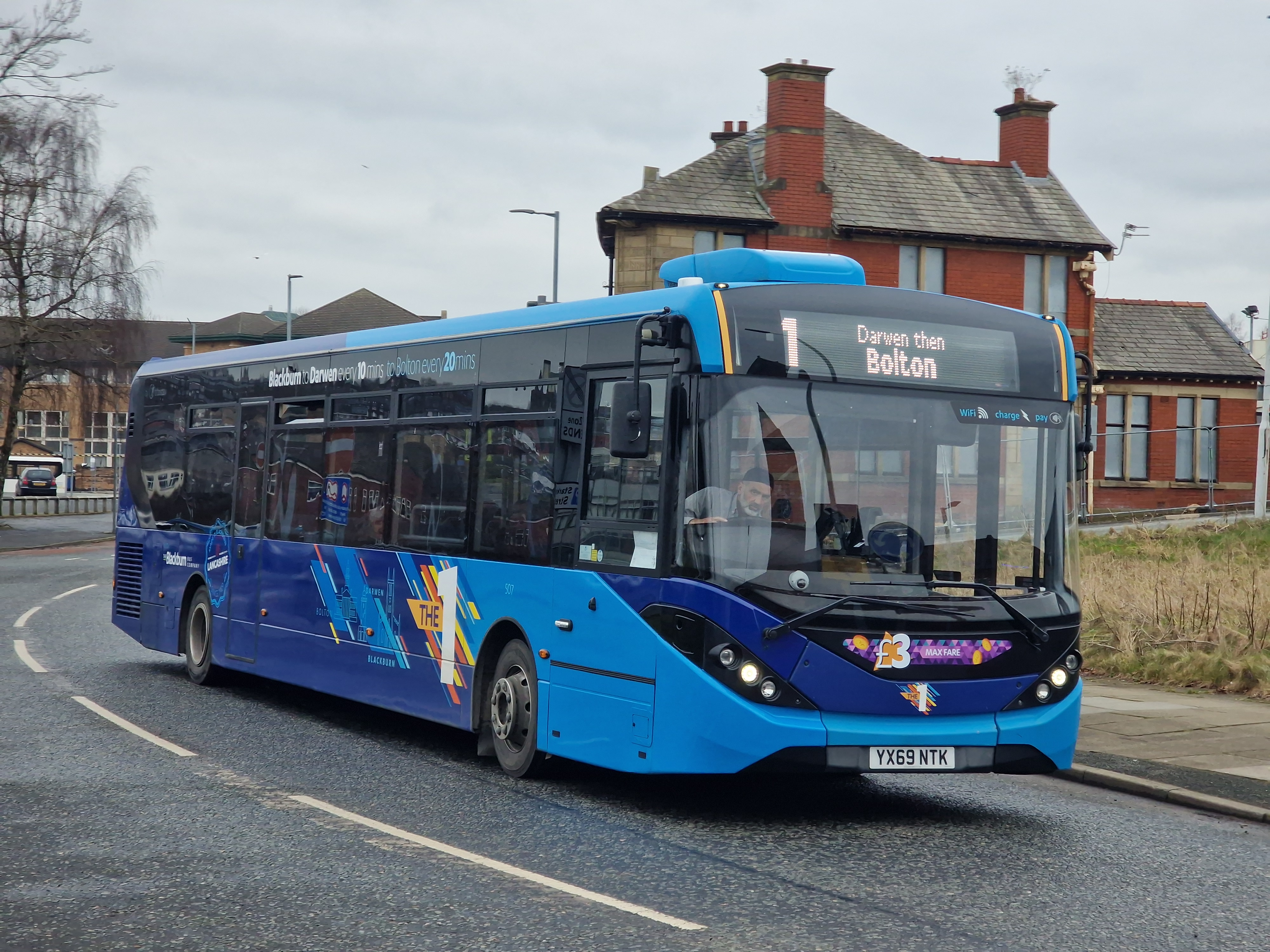
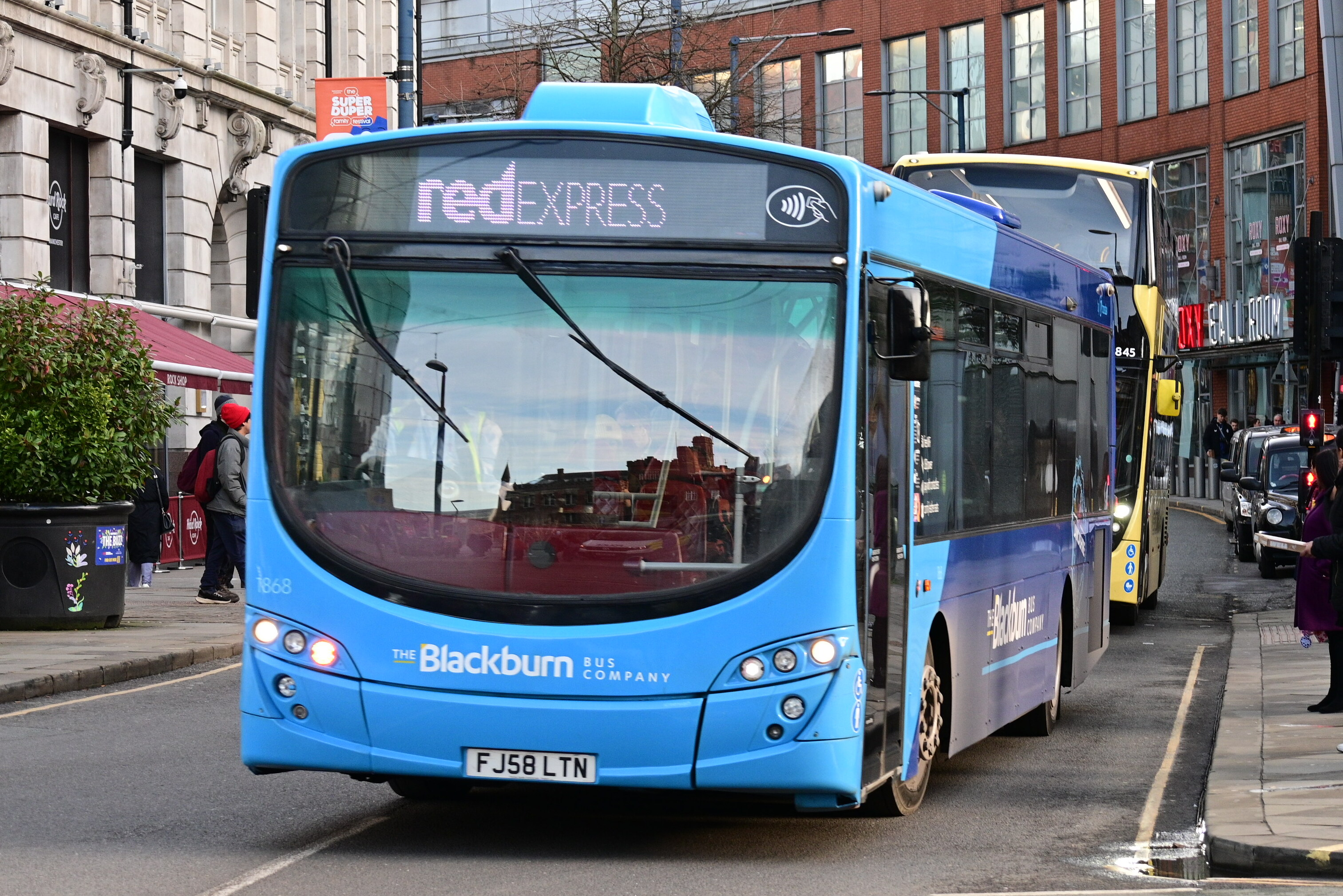
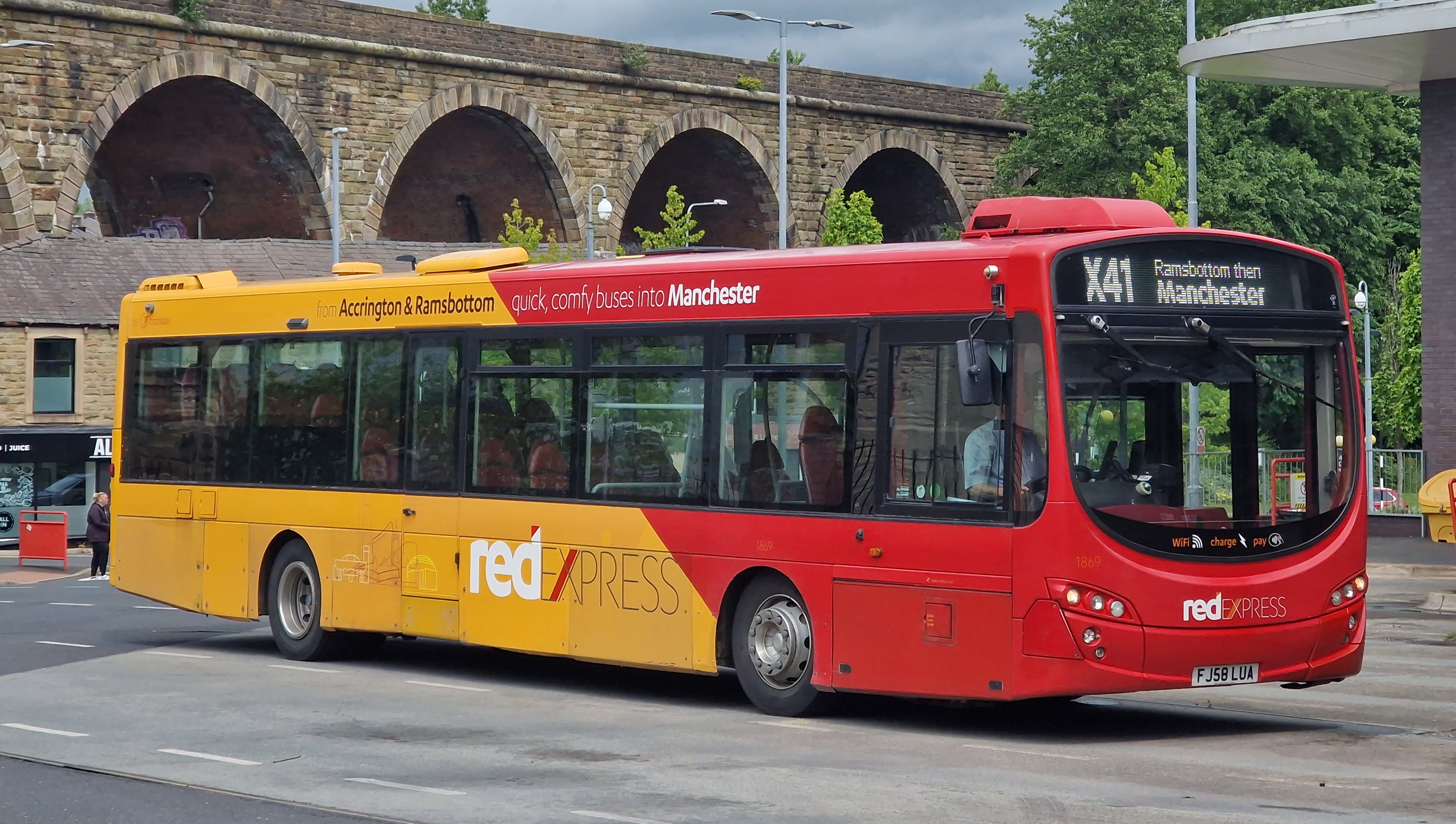

=== The Blackburn Bus Company ===
A rebrand of the company commenced in July 2016, beginning with the introduction of a fleet of Optare Versa single-deck vehicles, branded in the two-tone blue The Blackburn Bus Company livery. The brand encompasses a number of local services in the area, as well as being used as a base for other route brands, including The 1 and 6 & 7.

=== The 1 ===
Following a £2.5 million investment in the service, The 1 was rebranded in January 2020. The service, which operates between Blackburn and Darwen up to every ten minutes, with up to three buses per hour extending to Bolton, is served by a fleet of Alexander Dennis Enviro200 MMC single-deck vehicles. Features include free WiFi, USB and wireless charging and audio-visual next stop announcements.

=== 6 & 7 ===
Following the arrival of a batch of Optare Versa single-deck vehicles in July 2016, the former Hyndburn Connect branding was replaced by a new two-tone blue 6 & 7 livery. The vehicles were introduced to routes 6 and 7, which run between Accrington and Blackburn, in August 2016. Features include WiFi, USB charging and audio-visual next stop announcements.

=== Hotline ===
In 2016, service 152, which operates between Burnley and Preston via Blackburn was rebranded as Hotline. Initially using Volvo B7TL/Wright Gemini double-deck vehicles, the service was upgraded in February 2021. It is now operated by a fleet of Volvo B9TL/Wright Gemini 2 double-deck vehicles, branded in a two-tone purple livery. Features include free WiFi, USB charging and audio-visual next stop announcements.

=== Red Express X41 ===
The Red Express brand is used on service X41, which operates hourly between Accrington and Manchester via Haslingden. In January 2020, the service was announced to be axed, but was later reprieved. As part of this, the former double-deck Volvo B7TL/Wright Gemini vehicles allocated were replaced with single-deck Volvo B7RLE/Wright Eclipse 2 vehicles, branded in a two-tone yellow and red livery. Features include free WiFi, USB charging and audio-visual next stop announcements.

=== Valley Line ===
The Valley Line brand is used on service 22, which links Clitheroe, Whalley and Blackburn. It also serves Royal Blackburn Hospital and Shadsworth. In the past the service was operated by a fleet of Volvo B10BLE/Wright Renown single-deck vehicles, branded in a two-tone blue and yellow livery. However it now has no consistent allocations.

=== Services 2 and 2A ===
This service (formerly 24) operated from Blackburn to Chorley via Feniscowles. This service is run in partnership with Stagecoach who run the evening and Sunday services.

In September 2024, The Blackburn Bus Company introduced a sister route 2A which serves Chorley and South Ribble General Hospital instead of Eaves Lane.

=== Service 4 ===
This service operates to Leyburn Road via Mill Hill.

=== 464 ===
Route 464 operated between Accrington and Rochdale via Rawtenstall up to every 15 minutes, with a half-hourly frequency during the evening and on Sunday. This route was operated by a fleet of Optare Versa single-deck vehicles branded in a two-tone purple and pink livery. Features included free WiFi, USB and wireless charging and audio-visual next stop announcements. On 30 November 2025, this service was transferred from Rosso to the Blackburn Bus Company. In 2026, the Optare Versas were replaced by a fleet of 16 ADL Enviro200 MMC vehicles in a solid blue livery.

== Past services and Brands ==
=== Lancashire United ===
Introduced in 2001, Lancashire United's original livery was cream with blue and red stripes with a swoop towards the back and a black skirt in standard Blazefield style, many buses in this livery carried route branding such as Route 152, 225 and the Hyndburn Circular. This livery saw a refresh in 2010 consisting of yellow and blue with a distinctive red rose swooping up along the curve, the livery also carried a new Lancashire United logo.

=== Hyndburn Circular ===
This was a circular service that connected Blackburn with the towns of Rishton, Clayton-le-Moors, Great Harwood, Oswaldtwistle and Accrington in the district of Hyndburn. From May 2007 the service was part of the Spot On network.

=== The Outer Circle ===
The Blackburn Outer Circle was a circular service that connected schools, hospitals and leisure opportunities around the edge of the town. It was started by Blackburn Borough Transport in 1980 as the 50 (clockwise) and the 51 (anticlockwise). The Transport Department did not register the service for commercial operation, and after deregulation, it became one of several routes in the area won by GM Buses on a nil tender basis. GM Buses found out that these services were not as profitable as they had imagined and pulled out of the area entirely, on 26 January 1987 the route was returned to Blackburn Transport, who re-instated Leyland Atlantean double-deckers to operate the service. At the next round of tenders, the services passed to Ribble, who operated it using Leyland Olympians from Preston's Frenchwood garage. The route again reverted to Blackburn Transport using Optare Metroriders, the route was then renumbered as Track 5 with an A or C suffix denoting direction of travel.

In March 2006 the route became the OC and used Volvo Olympians which received a purple and orange livery with route branding, the vehicles and branding were retained on takeover by Lancashire United. As of August 2016 this route no longer operates due to budget cuts by Blackburn with Darwen Borough Council.

=== The Hyndburn Connect ===
Launched on 2 September 2013, Hyndburn Circular services 6 and 7 that link Blackburn with Oswaldtwistle, Accrington, Clayton-Le-Moors, Great Harwood and Rishton, a new Hyndburn Connect ticket was also introduced to replace the Spot On Hyndburn ticket and buses received branding for this service, replacing the Spot On branding for these services.

=== The X1 ===
The X1 was a semi-express route linking Clitheroe, Whalley and Accrington with Manchester. The route was for a time operated by a fleet of route branded Volvo Olympians and won a number of awards. The X1 and associated X2 were replaced with the X40/X41 service running between Blackburn, Accrington and Manchester. Route 241 was created for passengers between Clitheroe and Accrington, however this route has since passed in and out of the company's control a number of times and now no longer runs. A very limited number of journeys still commenced at Great Harwood.

=== The Lancashire Way ===
This was first introduced to complement the Witch Way branding for route X40/X41 from Manchester to Blackburn/Great Harwood/Whalley via Accrington. Originally using buses in a black and red livery with a Lancashire Rose. This livery later saw an update, using the newer Lancashire United Base livery on the double decker fleet. For a time, buses on route 152 also used this branding. In 2016 the more rural Whalley and Great Harwood journeys were axed in favour of the urban Blackburn, Accrington, Haslingden, Prestwich, Manchester service as Red Express with the 152 service becoming HotLine.

=== Ribble Valley Express ===
Used for the 280/X80 services for Preston-Clitheroe-Skipton, this livery was predominantly white with a large crimson circle with route listing below the windows and Ribble Valley Express logo above the skirt this livery was replaced by the new Lancashire United livery.

=== The Whalley Ranger ===
This service was introduced in late 2009 following customer requests after two years of the Whalley Range area being unserved by bus. The route used specially branded buses and operated every 10 minutes with a flat single fare of £1, on 14 June 2010 the service was extended to serve Openshaw Drive to replace Spot On route 24, with the frequency reduced to every 15 minutes and period tickets became valid. It was announced on 16 November 2010 that this service was to be withdrawn due to low patronage, the last service operated on 24 December 2010.

=== Route 124 ===
This route was renumbered '2' on 2 September 2013 and operated as a through service from Chorley to Blackburn, Blackburn Hospital and Darwen. From March 2014 the Blackburn to Chorley section was once again split from the Darwen section. The service running as route 24, and further re-numbered back to 2 in 2022.

=== Route 225 ===
Route 225 was a long established route which ran from Clitheroe to Bolton via Whalley, Blackburn & Darwen. As of 16 September 2012 this route was divided into two separate services with all buses now terminating in Blackburn town centre. The Blackburn to Clitheroe section being renumbered as Route 22 (now ValleyLine 22) and the Blackburn to Bolton section became Route 1 which has subsequently replaced Spot On 1.

=== Spot On ===
Following the acquisition of Blackburn Transport, both its services and Lancashire United's Hyndburn Circular routes were combined and branded as 'Spot On', the service was launched on 14 May 2007 with a fleet of 25 brand new single deck buses . Predominantly white, with sandy brown skirts and wear Spot On branding, the livery featured lifestyle pictures of passengers advertising attractive features of the service on the back of the buses. They originally carried varying colours of each route they operate, however since the overhaul of services in February 2009 most of the Spot on branded buses had their coloured route brandings removed, As of August 2011 new version of this livery had been applied to the buses, however due to services changes this livery was replaced with the new Lancashire United livery in July 2014.

==== Spot on 1 ====
As of 16 September 2012 this route was divided into two separate services replacing the Spot On branding from this route, renumbered as Route 41 to operate alongside the X41 between Blackburn and Accrington with the Blackburn to Darwen section becoming Route 1.

== Fleet ==
As of March 2024, the fleet consists of 63 buses. The fleet consists of diesel-powered single and double-deck buses manufactured by Optare, Alexander Dennis and Wrightbus.
