= Listed buildings in Leeds (City and Hunslet Ward - northern area) =

City and Hunslet is a ward in the metropolitan borough of the City of Leeds, West Yorkshire, England. It contains over 400 listed buildings that are recorded in the National Heritage List for England. Of these, eight are listed at Grade I, the highest of the three grades, 30 at Grade II*, the middle grade, and the others are at Grade II, the lowest grade.

Leeds is the largest city in Yorkshire, and has been a commercial centre since the 15th century. Its major industry has been textiles, especially wool, and later flax, the latter becoming a speciality of the city. Transport was provided by the Aire and Calder Navigation, begun in 1699, the Leeds and Liverpool Canal, opened in 1777, and the railways from the 1830s. The commercial centre developed to the north of the railway and river, with mills mainly around the river, and factories to the south of this producing machine parts for the mills, locomotives, and other items. This history is reflected by the listed buildings. The growing wealth of the area resulted in the building of Georgian houses and terraces in the later 18th and early 19th centuries, and this was following later in the 19th century by grand buildings housing offices, warehouses, banks and hotels. In due course impressive civic buildings, theatres and shopping arcades followed.

This list contains the listed buildings in the area to the north of the railway running from west to east on the south of the centre of the city. The area is mainly commercial, retail and residential, and it contains the major civic buildings, together with churches, chapels and associated structures, houses and associated structures, offices, banks, theatres, hotels and public houses, shops, markets and shopping arcades. The Leeds and Liverpool Canal passes through the area, and it contains three listed locks. Other listed buildings include bridges, a railway viaduct, part of a railway station, other railway buildings, hospital buildings, statues, a war memorial, and telephone kiosks.

== Key ==
Grade	Criteria
I	Buildings of exceptional interest, sometimes considered to be internationally important
II*	Particularly important buildings of more than special interest
II	Buildings of national importance and special interest

== Buildings ==
Name and location	Photograph	Date	Notes	Grade
2 Lambert's Yard; 53.79525°N 1.54218°W		Late 16th century (probable)	A workshop with a timber framed core, rendered, and encased in boarding, with a slate roof. There are three storeys, both upper storeys jettied, and three bays under a gable. The building contains 20th-century doorways and windows.	II
Pack Horse Public House; 53.79761°N 1.54265°W		Late 16th to early century	The public house was restored in 1987, and it has retained the remains of an earlier timber framed building. There are two storeys and one bay.	II
92 and 93 Briggate; 53.79882°N 1.54183°W		c. 1600	A shop, later a restaurant, it was refronted in about 1700 and 1800, and largely rebuilt in 1924–26. The building has a timber framed core, and the exterior is tiled. There are four storeys and three bays, with a modern shop front in the ground floor. The first and second floors contain recessed windows with decorated panels between the floors, they are flanked by pilasters with Classical motifs, and above is a dentilled cornice with lion masks. The top floor has paired windows under a pediment, they are flanked by plaques and panels with sunflower decoration, and are surmounted by urns.	II
St John's Church; 53.80020°N 1.54228°W		1632–34	The church was remodelled in 1830–38, restored in 1866–68 by Richard Norman Shaw, and further restored from 1885 by George Gilbert Scott Jr. followed by Temple Moore. The church is built in sandstone with a grey slate roof, and is in Perpendicular style. It consists of a nave, a south aisle, a south porch, and a west tower. The tower has three stages, diagonal corner buttresses with crocketed pinnacles, a west window, clock faces, and an embattled parapet with corner crocketed pinnacles. Along the sides are flat-headed Perpendicular windows. The porch has a pointed arch and a sundial.	I
Tudor Fish Restaurant; 53.80042°N 1.54158°W		1720	Built as a minister's house, later an academy, and then a restaurant, it is in brick on a plinth, stuccoed to resemble rusticated stone, with bands, a modillion eaves cornice, and a hipped stone slate roof. There are three storeys and five bays, the middle three bays projecting slightly. The central doorway has pilasters, an entablature with triglyphs, and a moulded cornice, and the windows are sashes with moulded surrounds.	II
Holy Trinity Church; 53.79624°N 1.54358°W		1722–27	The church was designed by William Etty and the spire was replaced by R. D. Chantrell after 1839. It is in stone and consists of a nave with a semicircular apse at the east end, and a west steeple. On the south side are two doorways, the right one false, with Gibbs surrounds. There are two tiers of windows, the lower ones with architraves and keystones, alternating triangular and segmental open pediments, and aprons, and the upper windows are square with architraves. Between the windows are giant Doric pilasters, and above is a triglyph frieze, a cornice and blocking course, and urn finials. The entrance at the west end has a round-arched doorway with a rusticated surround and a keystone, and above is a window with a triangular pediment. The tower has three stages and is surmounted by a spire with three diminishing stages and a cross. In the apse is a Venetian window.	I
165A and 166–169 Briggate; 53.79515°N 1.54230°W		Early 18th century	A house and workshops, later used for other purposes, the building is in red brick with sandstone dressings, quoins, a modillion cornice, and a slate roof, hipped on the right. There are three storeys and eight bays, the middle two bays slightly projecting. In the ground floor are modern shop fronts and an entry to the rear. The windows above are sashes with flat heads and keystones, and moulded sills.	II
9 and 10 Mill Hill; 53.79525°N 1.54546°W		Early 18th century	A house, warehouse and workshops, later altered and used for other purposes, the building is in brick with stone dressings, a modillion eaves cornice, and a slate roof. There are three storeys and six bays. In the ground floor are two doorways, both with fanlights, and one with a moulded surround, and two modern shop fronts. The upper floors contain sash windows, those in the middle floor are tall with segmental heads, and those in the top floor are square.	II
159 Briggate; 53.79561°N 1.54233°W		Mid 18th century	A shop, later a restaurant, it incorporates 17th-century roof material and was refronted in the 19th century. The building is in rendered brick with terracotta details. There are three storeys and an attic, a front of three bays, and a rear range of three storeys and five bays. The ground floor contains a modern shop front, and in the top floor and attic are windows with architraves. The attic window is in a pediment, and flanked by moulded plaques and urn finials.	II
48 Call Lane; 53.79528°N 1.54137°W		Mid 18th century	A house with a warehouse at the rear, later used for other purposes, it is in rendered brick with quoins, sill bands, and a slate roof. There are three storeys, a front of four bays, and seven bays along the warehouse. In the ground floor is a modern front, and above are sash windows with architraves, in the middle floor with keystones. The windows in the warehouse have segmental heads, and loading doors have been converted into windows.	II
1–5 Queen's Court; 53.79519°N 1.54201°W	—	Mid 18th century	A row of houses and workshops, later shops, in red brick with slate roofs. It consists of a rear wing with three storeys and seven bays, a range with two storeys and three bays, and a further range with two storeys and four bays.	II
South range 53.79510°N 1.54183°W	—	Mid 18th century	A warehouse and workshops, later altered and used for other purposes. They are in red brick with a slate roof. There are two blocks, one has three storeys and six bays, and the other, recessed slightly on the right, has three storeys and seven bays. The openings vary, and include a round-arched doorway, former loading doors with cambered heads, and windows, some with cambered heads and others with flat heads.	II
4, 5 and 6 Mill Hill; 53.79551°N 1.54551°W		Mid to late 18th century (probable)	A house with a factory and warehouse at the rear, later used for other purposes, the building incorporates 17th-century material. It is in red brick, rendered at the rear, with stone dressings, pilasters, sill bands, a modillion eaves cornice, and a roof tiled at the front and slated at the rear. There are three storeys and nine bays, and at the rear are parallel wings and a range completing the yard. In the ground floor is a central passageway flanked by modern shop fronts. The middle floor windows have round heads, keystones and imposts, and in the top floor they have segmental heads.	II
5 and 7 Crown Street; 53.79615°N 1.53975°W		Late 18th century	A row of three houses, at one time a public house, later used for other purposes, they are rendered and have a slate roof. There are three storeys and six bays. In the ground floor are two shop fronts, and to the right is a doorway in an architrave, and two sash windows. In the middle floor are sash windows, some in architraves, and the top floor contains casement windows.	II
13 and 14 Park Square and railings 53.79833°N 1.55101°W		Late 18th century	A pair of houses, later offices, they are in red brick, with stone dressings and slate roofs. There are two storeys, No. 13 has five bays, and No. 14 has three. The doorways have moulded architraves, three-light fanlights, and cornices. The windows are sashes with wedge lintels, and in front of the buildings are wrought iron railings.	II
9 Somers Street; 53.79922°N 1.55337°W		Late 18th century	A workshop, warehouse and office in dark red brick, partly rendered, with a slate roof. There are three storeys, and fronts of five and two bays. The openings have segmental-arched heads, some of the windows have side-sliding sashes, and there is a blocked loading door.	II
Angel Buildings; 53.79820°N 1.54277°W		Late 18th century	A public house in brick, the ground floor rendered, with three storeys, attics and a basement, and two bays. In the ground floor is a round-arched passage entry on the right, a larger entrance on the left and a window between, all with hood moulds. The upper floors contain casement windows.	II
Oddy's Locks; 53.79703°N 1.56710°W		Late 18th century	A pair of locks on the Leeds and Liverpool Canal. The walls, steps, revetment walls, and the overflow channel are in gritstone, and there are three timber gates.	II
Spring Gardens Lock; 53.79933°N 1.57025°W		Late 18th century	The lock is on the Leeds and Liverpool Canal. The lock walls, the revetment walls, and the overflow channel are in stone. There are two sets of timber gates and a modern steel footbridge.	II
St Anns Ing Lock; 53.79470°N 1.56152°W		Late 18th century	The lock is on the Leeds and Liverpool Canal. The lock walls and the revetment walls are in gritstone. There are two sets of timber gates and a modern steel footbridge.	II
Scarbrough Hotel; 53.79540°N 1.54633°W		Late 18th century	The public house was refronted in the early 20th century. It is in brick with terracotta tiles, a dentilled cornice, and a parapet containing the name of the building and the brewery. There are two storeys and five bays, and the ground floor contains a pub front with Ionic columns. In the upper floor, the left three windows have decorative surrounds and cornices on consoles under which are festoons. The two windows on the right are smaller and have aprons.	II
Whitelock's Public House; 53.79722°N 1.54312°W		Late 18th century	The public house, which was altered in 1886, is in painted brick, with ornate cast iron brackets to the eaves and slate roofs. There are two and three storeys, eight bays, along the public house, four bays along the former brewhouse and cottage, and a taller three-bay range at the west end. The public house has two doorways, one with a moulded architrave, fluted pilasters, and a dentilled cornice on consoles. Above the pilastered windows is a cornice over a stained glass panel with lettering. The windows are casements with moulded surrounds, some with segmental heads.	II*
Remains of northwest range of White Cloth Hall; 53.79562°N 1.53975°W		1776	The entrance to the former cloth hall is in red brick, partly rendered, with stone dressings and a slate roof. The entrance bay contains three round arches with moulded surrounds, rusticated pilasters, keystones, and imposts, and above is a pediment containing a circular window. Flanking this are arcades of round-headed arches, with four to the left and three to the right. On the top is a stone cupola of 1756, formerly on the Second Cloth Hall.	II*
5, 6 and 7 Park Place; 53.79768°N 1.55118°W		1777	A row of three houses, later offices, in a terrace, they are in red brick with bands, slate roofs, and three storeys. The outer buildings have three bays, and the central house has five bays under a corniced pediment containing a circular window. The doorways to the outer houses are in round-arched recesses with imposts, and the right house has two ground floor windows in similar recesses; in the left house these windows have been replaced. The central house has a flat-headed entrance. The windows are a mix of sashes and casements, and the windows in the middle bay of the central house have architraves, that in the first floor also with a segmental pediment.	II
Waterloo House; 53.79584°N 1.53925°W		1777	The northeast range of White Cloth Hall with assembly rooms above, it has been altered and converted into a shopping arcade. The building is in stuccoed red brick with stone dressings, a plat band, a modillion cornice, a parapet, and a slate roof. It is mainly in two storeys and has 15 bays. Near the centre is a wider bay with a pediment, and in the upper floor is a Venetian window with three-quarter Tuscan columns, a cornice, and an archivolt broken by voussoirs. In the ground floor are round-arched openings, and the upper floor contains an arcade with lunette windows.	II*
4 Park Place; 53.79764°N 1.55083°W		c. 1785	A house, later offices, in red brick, with sill bands, bracketed eaves and a slate roof. There are three storeys and a symmetrical front of five bays. The central doorway has a moulded architrave, a rectangular fanlight, and a pediment on consoles, and the windows are sashes.	II
8 Park Place; 53.79774°N 1.55151°W		1785–94	A house in a terrace, later offices, it is in red brick with stone dressings, a sill band, a modillion eaves cornice, and a slate roof. There are three storeys and a symmetrical front of five bays. Steps lead up to the central doorway that has a moulded architrave, a fanlight, and a hood on consoles, and the windows are sashes.	II
9 Park Place; 53.79775°N 1.55170°W		1785–94	A house in a terrace, later offices, it is in red brick with stone dressings, a sill band, a modillion eaves cornice, and a slate roof. There are three storeys and a symmetrical front of five bays. Steps lead up to the central doorway that has three-quarter Tuscan columns, a fanlight, an entablature, and a dentilled pediment, and the windows are sashes.	II
10 Park Place and railings 53.79780°N 1.55185°W		1785–94	A house, later offices, in red brick with stone dressings, a sill band, and a slate mansard roof. There are three storeys and an attic, and three bays. Steps lead up to a doorway in the left bay that has three-quarter Tuscan columns, a fanlight, an entablature, a dentilled cornice, and a pediment. The windows are sashes, and in front of the building are wrought iron railings and a boot scraper.	II
11 and 12 Park Place and railings 53.79778°N 1.55203°W		c. 1785–94	A house, later offices, in red brick with stone dressings, a sill band, a modillion eaves cornice, and a slate roof. There are three storeys and five bays. Steps lead up to the central doorway that has three-quarter Tuscan columns, a semicircular fanlight, a dentilled cornice, and a pediment. In the left bay is an added stone porch that has Ionic columns and a moulded pediment. The windows are sashes with wedge lintels, and in front of the area are wrought iron railings.	II
8 Park Square; 53.79889°N 1.55079°W		c. 1788–89	A red brick house with modillion eaves and cornice, and a slate roof. There are three storeys, an attic and a basement, and five bays, the middle three bays projecting slightly under a pediment, with a circular window in the tympanum. Steps lead up to the central doorway that has rusticated jambs, fluted columns, a semicircular fanlight above which is festoon decoration in stucco, and a segmental open pediment. The windows are sashes, those in the lower two floors with wedge lintels, and in the top floor with a moulded string course between them.	II
13 and 14 Park Place and railings 53.79787°N 1.55235°W		1788–91	A pair of houses, later offices, they are in red brick with stone dressings, a sill band, and a slate roof. There are three storeys and basements, and each house has three bays. Steps lead up to the doorways in the left bays, and each has pilasters, a semicircular fanlight, an entablature, and a pediment. The windows are sashes with slightly cambered wedge lintels, and the basement areas are enclosed by wrought iron railings with a gate.	II
20 Park Place; 53.79801°N 1.55343°W		1789	A house, later offices, in red brick with a sill band, a bracketed eaves cornice, and a slate roof. There are three storeys and a basement, and a symmetrical front of five bays. The central doorway has an architrave, a fanlight, and a pediment, and the windows are sashes.	II
15 Park Place and railings 53.79790°N 1.55257°W		c. 1790	A house, later an office, it is in red brick on a stone plinth, with stone dressings, a sill band, a moulded eaves cornice, and a slate roof. There are three storeys, and a symmetrical front of five bays. Steps lead up to the central doorway that has a semicircular fanlight, a cornice, and a pediment, and the windows are sashes with wedge lintels. In front of the building are wrought iron railings.	II
6 Park Square and railings 53.79910°N 1.55070°W		c. 1790	A house in a terrace, later offices, it is in red brick with stone dressings, a dentilled eaves cornice, and a slate roof. There are two storeys and a basement, and a symmetrical front of five bays. Steps lead up to the central doorway that has pilasters, a semicircular fanlight, an entablature, and a pediment. The windows are sashes with wedge lintels, and the basement area is enclosed by wrought iron railings.	II
7 Park Square and railings 53.79901°N 1.55073°W		c. 1790	A house in a terrace, later offices, it is in red brick with stone dressings, and a slate roof. There are two storeys and a basement, and a symmetrical front of five bays. Steps flanked by terracotta walls lead up to the central doorway that has a terracotta surround, a four-centred arch, and a shaped pediment. The windows are sashes with wedge lintels, and the basement area is enclosed by iron railings.	II
10 Park Square and railings 53.79866°N 1.55087°W		c. 1790	A house, later offices, in red brick with stone dressings and a slate roof. There are three storeys and a basement, a symmetrical front of five bays, and a two-bay extension to the right. The central doorway has fluted Corinthian columns, a fanlight and a pediment, and in the extension is a carriage entrance. The windows are sashes with wedge lintels, and at the rear is a round-arched stair window. Enclosing the basement area are wrought iron railings.	II
11 Park Square and railings 53.79848°N 1.55094°W		1790	A house, later used for other purposes, it is in red brick with stone dressings and a slate roof. There are three storeys and a basement, and a symmetrical front of five bays. Steps lead up to the central doorway that has jambs imitating rusticated stone work, fluted attached columns, a fanlight, and a segmental open pediment containing stucco decoration. The windows are sashes with wedge lintels, and enclosing the basement area are wrought iron railings.	II
12 Park Square and railings 53.79839°N 1.55100°W		c. 1790	A house, later offices, it is in red brick with stone dressings and a slate roof. There are two storeys and an attic, and three bays. Steps lead up to a doorway in the left bay that has an architrave, a semicircular fanlight, and a dentilled cornice. The windows are sashes with wedge lintels, and in the attic is a gabled dormer. Enclosing the basement area are wrought iron railings.	II
17, 18 and 19 Park Place and railings 53.79799°N 1.55309°W		1791	A row of three houses with a symmetrical design, they are in red brick with stone dressings, and bands. There are three storeys and attics, the middle house has five bays, and the outer houses have three bays each. Steps lead up to the central doorway in the middle house that has three-quarter Tuscan columns, a semicircular fanlight, and a pediment. Between the bays in the upper floor are giant Ionic pilasters. The windows are sashes with wedge lintels, in the ground floor recessed in round arches, and in the middle floor with balustrades. At the top is a full-width pediment with a semicircular window in the tympanum. The outer houses have similar doorways in the outer bays, and similar windows, without balustrades. The basement areas are enclosed by cast iron railings.	II
39 and 40 Park Square and railings 53.79935°N 1.55189°W		1793	A pair of mirror-image houses, later offices, in red brick with stone dressings, a floor band, bracketed eaves, and a slate roof. There are three storeys and basements, and each house has three bays. Steps lead up to the doorways in the outer bays that each has a semicircular fanlight, a fluted entablature, and a cornice. The windows are sashes, and the basement areas are enclosed by iron railings.	II
42 Park Square and railings 53.79929°N 1.55142°W		1793	A house, later offices, in red brick with stone dressings, a sill band, a dentilled eaves cornice, and a slate roof. There are two storeys, an attic and a basement, a symmetrical front of five bays, and a pediment above the middle three bays containing a round window in the tympanum, and on the left is an additional bay. Steps lead up to the central doorway that has three-quarter Tuscan columns, a semicircular fanlight, and an open pediment. The windows are sashes with wedge lintels, and the basement area is enclosed by wrought iron railings.	II
5 Park Square and railings 53.79920°N 1.55065°W		c. 1793–1806	A house in a terrace, later offices, it is in red brick with stone dressings, a dentilled eaves cornice, and a slate roof. There are two storeys and a basement, and a symmetrical front of five bys. Steps lead up to the central doorway that has fluted pilasters, a semicircular fanlight, an entablature, and a pediment. The windows are sashes with wedge lintels, and the basement area is enclosed by iron railings.	II
1a Albion Place; 53.79798°N 1.54467°W		1795	Originally the wing of a house, later used for other purposes, it is in red brick with stone dressings, a modillion cornice, and a slate roof. There are two storeys and a basement, and two bays. The doorway in the left bay has a fanlight and a cornice on console brackets, and in the right bay is a canted bay window. The upper floor contains sash windows, and between the floors are recessed rectangular panels.	II
Former Leeds Law Society premises 53.79803°N 1.54481°W		1795	A house, later altered and used for other purposes, it is in red brick with stone dressings, on a sandstone plinth, with a string course, a modillion cornice, a full-width pediment containing an oval window in the tympanum, and a slate roof. There are two storeys, an attic and a basement, and a front of five bays. Steps lead up to the central doorway that has paired Tuscan columns, and above is a round-arched recess containing a fanlight with a keystone. The windows are sashes with flat brick arches. At the rear is a round-headed stair window.	II
41 Park Square and railings 53.79934°N 1.55168°W		1796	A house, later offices, in red brick with stone dressings, a sill band, a dentilled eaves cornice, and a slate roof. There are two storeys and a symmetrical front of five bays, the middle three bays projecting slightly under a pediment with an oval window in the tympanum. Steps lead up to the central doorway that has three-quarter Tuscan columns, a semicircular fanlight, an entablature, a cornice, and a pediment. The windows are sashes, and the basement area is enclosed by wrought iron railings.	II
26 Park Square and railings 53.79894°N 1.55305°W		1797	A house, later offices in a terrace, in red brick with stone dressings, a sill band, and a slate roof. There are three storeys and a basement, and three bays. Steps lead up to a doorway in the left bay that has pilasters, a semicircular fanlight, and an open pediment. The windows are sashes with wedge lintels, and the basement area is enclosed by wrought iron railings.	II
27 Park Square and railings 53.79900°N 1.55303°W		c. 1797	A house, later offices in a terrace, in red brick with stone dressings, a sill band, and a slate roof. There are three storeys and a basement, and three bays. Steps lead up to a doorway in the left bay that has Tuscan three-quarter columns, a semicircular fanlight with intersecting glazing bars, and an entablature. The windows are sashes with wedge lintels, and at the rear is a bay window. The basement area is enclosed by wrought iron railings.	II
28 Park Square and railings 53.79906°N 1.55300°W		c. 1797	A house, later offices in a terrace, in red brick with stone dressings, a sill band, and a slate roof. There are three storeys and a basement, and three bays. Steps lead up to a doorway in the left bay that has Tuscan three-quarter columns, a semicircular fanlight with radial glazing bars, and an entablature. The windows are sashes with wedge lintels, and the basement area is enclosed by wrought iron railings.	II
29 Park Square and railings 53.79913°N 1.55298°W		c. 1800	A house in a terrace, later offices, it is in red brick with stone dressings and a slate roof. There are four storeys and a basement, and three bays. Steps lead up to a doorway in the right bay that has pilasters, a semicircular fanlight, and a pediment. The windows are sashes in moulded frames and have wedge lintels, and the basement area is enclosed by wrought iron railings.	II
30 Park Square and railings 53.79919°N 1.55294°W		c. 1800	A house in a terrace, later offices, it is in red brick with stone dressings and a slate roof. There are four storeys and a basement, and three bays. Steps lead up to a doorway in the right bay that has pilasters, a semicircular fanlight, and a pediment. The windows are sashes with wedge lintels, and the basement area is enclosed by iron railings.	II
31 Park Square and railings 53.79925°N 1.55291°W		c. 1800	A house in a terrace, later offices, it is in red brick with stone dressings and a slate roof. There are three storeys and a basement, and three bays. Steps lead up to a doorway in the right bay that has fluted pilasters, a semicircular fanlight, and a pediment. The windows are sashes, those in the lower two floors with wedge lintels, and the basement area is enclosed by wrought iron railings.	II
43 and 45 Park Square and railings 53.79927°N 1.55121°W		c. 1800	A house, later an office, in red brick with stone dressings, a band, an eaves cornice with gutter brackets, and a slate roof. There are three storeys and a basement, and three bays. Steps lead up to the central doorway that has a semicircular fanlight and a cornice, and in the right bay is a round-arched entrance. The windows are sashes with segmental heads, those in the outer bays tripartite. The basement area is enclosed by wrought iron railings.	II
1–4 Park Square; 53.79935°N 1.55060°W		c. 1806–15	A row of red brick houses, later offices, with a slate roof. There are two storeys and basements, and 14 bays. Steps lead up to the doorways that have moulded surrounds, entablatures and cornices. The windows are sashes with wedge lintels. No. 3 has a tripartite ground floor window.	II
24, 25 and 25A Park Square and railings 53.79884°N 1.55308°W		1806–15	Three houses, later offices, in red brick with stone dressings, a floor band, a moulded cornice, and a slate roof with a coped gable. There are three storeys, and attic and a basement, and eight bays. Steps lead up to the three doorways that have rectangular fanlights, the two on the right with pilasters and cornices, and the one on the left with a plainer surround. The windows are sashes, and the right ground floor window has been replaced by a bay window. The basement areas are enclosed by wrought iron railings.	II
32 Park Square and railings 53.79933°N 1.55290°W		c. 1806–15	The house, later offices, which was later remodelled, is in red brick with some diapering, stone and stucco dressings, and a slate roof. There are four storeys and two bays. The porch in the right bay has Tuscan columns, a triglyph frieze, a modillion cornice, and a balustrade. To the left is a canted bay window with similar features, and the windows in the upper floors have pilasters and pediments. Enclosing the basement area are wrought iron railings.	II
45 Park Square and railings 53.79925°N 1.55105°W		1806–15	A house, later an office at the end of a terrace, it is in red brick with stone dressings, a band, bracketed eaves, and a slate roof. There are three storeys and a basement, and three bays. Steps lead up to the central doorway that has pilasters, a semicircular fanlight, and a cornice. The ground floor windows are tripartite with segmental heads, and the windows in the upper floors are sashes with flat brick arches. Enclosing the basement area are iron railings.	II
2 Queen Square; 53.80376°N 1.54568°W		c. 1806–22	A house, later used for other purposes, it is in red brick with stone dressings, a sill band, and a slate roof. There are three storeys and a basement, a symmetrical front of five bays, and a narrow bay on the left. Above the main range is a pediment, a modillion cornice, and a blind elliptical window in the tympanum. Steps lead up to the central doorway that has rusticated jambs, Tuscan three-quarter columns, a semicircular fanlight with a keystone, and an open segmental pediment. There is a similar doorway in the left bay, and the windows are sashes with wedge lintels.	II
16–20 Commercial Street, including Leeds Library; 53.79751°N 1.54443°W		1808	A row of shops with a library above, it was altered between 1821 and 1836 by R. D. Chantrell, and by Thomas Ambler in 1879–81. The building is in stone, it has three storeys and a basement, and six bays. The ground floor is rusticated and contains shop fronts in segmental arches, and in the narrow left bay is a round-headed passageway. The upper floors contain Ionic pilasters, an entablature, and an eaves cornice and blocking course. The windows are sashes in moulded architraves, those in the middle floor with moulded cornices.	II*
19 and 20 Queen Square; 53.80312°N 1.54542°W	—	1810–15	A pair of houses in red brick with stone dressings and a slate roof. There are two storeys, and each house has two bays. The doorways are on the left, and each has fluted pilasters, a semicircular fanlight, No. 20 with radial glazing bars, and an open dentilled pediment. The windows are sashes with moulded surrounds.	II
21 Queen Square; 53.80327°N 1.54563°W		c. 1810–15	A house, later used for other purposes, it is in red brick with stone dressings and a slate roof. There are two storeys and a basement, and two bays. Steps lead up to the doorway that has reeded pilasters, a semicircular fanlight, and an open dentilled pediment. The windows are sashes with moulded surrounds.	II
22 Queen Square; 53.80331°N 1.54570°W		c. 1810–15	A house, later used for other purposes, it is rendered, with stone dressings, gutter brackets, and a slate roof. There are two storeys and a basement, and two bays. Steps lead up to the doorway that has a semicircular fanlight with radial glazing bars, and a cornice on consoles. The windows are sashes, the ground floor window with a wedge lintel.	II
23 Queen Square; 53.80334°N 1.54576°W		c. 1810–15	A house in rendered brick with stone dressings and a slate roof. There are two storeys and a basement, and one bay. Steps lead up to the doorway that has pilasters, a semicircular fanlight, and a cornice on consoles. The windows are sashes with wedge lintels.	II
24, 25 and 26 Queen Square; 53.80339°N 1.54585°W		c. 1810–15	A row of three red brick houses at the end of a terrace, later used for other purposes, with stone dressings, eaves brackets, and a slate roof with a coped gable on the right. There are two storeys and a basement, and each house has one bay. Steps lead up to the doorways that have pilasters, semicircular fanlights, two with radial glazing bars, and cornices on consoles. The windows are sashes with wedge lintels.	II
7 and 8 Queen Square and railings 53.80396°N 1.54523°W		1815–22	A pair of houses later used for other purposes, they are in red brick with stone dressings, gutter brackets and a slate roof. There are two storeys and basements, and each part has two bays, those of the left part narrower. Steps lead up to the doorways that each has a semicircular fanlight, imposts and a keystone. To the right is a shop window with a fluted architrave and a pediment, above the left doorway is a small inserted window, and the other windows are sashes with wedge lintels. Enclosing the basement areas are iron railings.	II
9 and 10 Queen Square and railings 53.80388°N 1.54510°W		1815–22	A pair of houses, later offices, they are in rendered brick with stone dressings and a slate roof. There are two storeys and basements, and each house has two bays. The doorways are in the left bays, and each has a panelled architrave, a semicircular fanlight, and a cornice. The windows are sashes in moulded frames, and the basement areas are enclosed by iron railings.	II
11 and 12 Queen Square; 53.80383°N 1.54502°W		c. 1815–22	A pair of houses in a terrace, they are in rendered brick with a slate roof. There are two storeys and basements, and each house has two bays. Steps lead up to the doorways that each has a semicircular fanlight with radial glazing bars, imposts and a keystone. The windows are sashes with wedge lintels. Flanking the ground floor window of No. 12 are circular windows and there is a dormer window.	II
13 and 14 Queen Square; 53.80372°N 1.54482°W		c. 1815–22	A pair of houses in a terrace, they are in rendered brick with a slate roof. There are two storeys and basements, and each house has two bays. Steps lead up to the doorway of No.13 that has an architrave, a semicircular fanlight with radial glazing bars, and a keystone. No. 14 has a wide entrance with double doors and a projecting surround. The windows are sashes with architraves.	II
15 Queen Square; 53.80366°N 1.54471°W		c. 1815–22	A red brick house in a terrace with gutter brackets and a slate roof. There are two storeys and a basement, and two bays. Steps lead up to the doorway in the left bay that has reeded pilasters, a semicircular fanlight with radial glazing bars, and an open dentilled pediment. The windows are sashes with wedge lintels.	II
16 Queen Square and railings 53.80362°N 1.54464°W	—	1815–22	A house, later offices, it is in red brick, the basement is in stone, and it has a modillion eaves cornice and a slate roof. There are two storeys and a basement, and three bays. Steps lead up to a doorway in the left bay that has reeded pilasters, a semicircular fanlight with radial glazing bars, an entablature, and a cornice. The windows have small panes, and the basement area is enclosed by iron railings.	II
17 and 18 Queen Square and railings 53.80356°N 1.54454°W		1815–22	A pair of houses, later offices, in red brick with stone dressings and a slate roof. There are three storeys and a basement, and each house has three bays. The doorways are in the left bays, and each has fluted Doric columns, a semicircular fanlight, an entablature, and a cornice. The windows are sashes, and the basement areas are enclosed by iron railings.	II
11, 12 and 14 Bond Court; 53.79768°N 1.54750°W		1815–31	A house, later offices, it is rendered, with sill bands and a slate roof. There are four storeys and four bays. Steps lead up to doorways in the outer bays that have fluted pilasters and cornices. The windows are sashes with moulded surrounds.	II
36, 37 and 38 Park Square and railings 53.79937°N 1.55216°W		1815–31 (probable)	A row of three houses, later offices, in red brick with stone dressings, a band, and slate roofs. There are two storeys and attics, and the houses from the left have three, four, and two bays. Steps lead up to the doorways that have semicircular fanlights. The left house has pilasters, an entablature, and a cornice on console brackets, and the other houses have attached Tuscan columns, an entablature, a cornice and a blocking course. The windows are sashes, those in the middle house with panels below, and at the top is a parapet containing four carved panels. Enclosing the basement areas are wrought iron railings.	II
Wellington Bridge; 53.79647°N 1.56234°W	—	1817–19	The bridge, which was designed by John Rennie, carries Wellington Street over the River Aire. It is in stone and consists of a single elliptical arch with a span of about 31 metres (102 ft). The bridge was widened in 1873.	II
3 Stead House; 53.80475°N 1.55342°W		1821	A house, later part of the University of Leeds, it is in rendered brick, with stone dressings, a sill band, a cornice and a blocking course, and a slate roof. There are two storeys and a symmetrical front of five bays, with a pediment over the middle three bays containing a round-headed window in the tympanum. The central doorway has three-quarter Tuscan columns, a semicircular fanlight, and an open pediment, and the windows are sashes.	II
88–91 Briggate; 53.79894°N 1.54178°W		Early 19th century	A shop on a corner site, it was refaced in about 1925, and is in brick with render incised with bands, and pilasters with plaques and swags, and a slate roof. There are three storeys, attics and cellars, eight bays on Briggate, four in The Headrow, and a curved corner. In the ground floor are modern shop fronts, and the upper floors contain sash windows. The front facing The Headrow is pedimented, and contains a lunette in the tympanum.	II
31 Commercial Street; 53.79732°N 1.54431°W		Early 19th century	A house, later a shop, it is rendered, and has four storeys and two bays. In the ground floor is a modern shop front, and above is an entablature with Doric corner pilasters, a cornice and a blocking course. The windows are sashes with architraves, above the first floor is a pulvinated frieze, and the upper floors contain continuous sills.	II
7 Greek Street and railings 53.79853°N 1.54761°W		Early 19th century	A house, later offices, it is rendered, with chamfered quoins, sill bands, a blocking course and an eaves cornice. There are three storeys and a basement, and a symmetrical front of five bays. The central doorway has half Ionic columns, a rectangular fanlight, a frieze, and a pediment. The windows have architraves, and the basement area is enclosed by wrought iron railings.	II
11, 12 and 13 Hirst's Yard; 53.79568°N 1.54154°W		Early 19th century	A group of workshops in red brick with slate roofs, two storeys and basements. The left block is taller, with four bays, and contains a loading door and hoist in the second bay. The right block has two bays, and both parts have windows with cambered heads and arched basement openings.	II
7 and 8 Mill Hill; 53.79536°N 1.54546°W		Early 19th century	A warehouse later used for other purposes, it is in red-orange brick, rendered on the left return, with stone dressings and a modillion eaves cornice. There are five storeys, the top storey in the roof space, and five bays, the middle three bays slightly projecting. In the ground floor is a modern front, and above are sash windows; the windows in the second and fourth bays of the first floor have a cornice on brackets with central decoration, and the corresponding windows in the second floor have cornices in brackets and shallow segmental pediments.	II
3 and 4 Queen Square and railings 53.80388°N 1.54558°W		Early 19th century	A pair of houses in a terrace, later used for other purposes, they are in red brick with stone dressings, a sill band, gutter brackets, and a slate roof. There are three storeys and basements, and the houses are mirrored, with three bays each. The doorways in the outer bays are approached by steps, and each has three-quarter Tuscan columns, a fluted frieze, and an open segmental pediment. The windows are sashes with wedge lintels, and the basement areas are enclosed by iron railings on low walls.	II
5 and 6 Queen Square; 53.80395°N 1.54545°W		Early 19th century	A pair of brick houses in a terrace with stone dressings, gutter brackets and a slate roof. There are three storeys and each house has two bays. Steps lead up to the doorways in the left bays that have panelled pilasters and semicircular fanlights, the right house also has a cornice on consoles. The windows are sashes with wedge lintels.	II
2, 4 and 4a Queen Street and 27 York Place and railings 53.79724°N 1.55423°W		Early 19th century	A row of houses on a corner site, later offices, in red brick with stone dressings, a band, three storeys and basements. There are eight bays on the front and two on the left return. Steps lead up to the three doorways, the right two with semicircular fanlights, and the left with a rectangular fanlight. The windows are sashes with flat brick arches, those in the ground floor with panelled aprons. Enclosing the basement areas are iron railings.	II
7 The Headrow; 53.79884°N 1.54037°W		Early 19th century (probable)	A house later used for other purposes, it incorporates earlier material, and is rendered, with sill bands, and a slate roof. There are three storeys, a front of two bays, and a rear range of six bays. In the ground floor is a shop front, and above are sash windows.	II
11, 12 and 13 York Place and 8 Britannia Street; 53.79701°N 1.55229°W		Early 19th century	A group of houses, later offices, on a corner site, they are in red brick with stone dressings, a sill band, and a hipped slate roof. There are three storey and basements. The two houses in York Place have three bays each, the right house has two narrow bays, and there are three bays on Britannia Street. Three of the doorways are approached by steps and each has an architrave, a fanlight, an entablature, and a cornice on scrolled brackets, and the right doorway on York Place has a plain surround and a segmental head. The windows are sashes with segmental brick arches, and the basement areas are enclosed by wrought iron railings.	II
20 York Place; 53.79716°N 1.55344°W		Early 19th century	A house in a terrace in red brick, with stone dressings, a sill band, and a slate roof. There are three storeys and a basement, and three bays. In the ground floor are two round-arched doorways with fanlights, between them is a bow window with a cornice, and the windows are sashes. Enclosing the basement area are wrought iron railings.	II
21 York Place and railings 53.79721°N 1.55354°W		Early 19th century	A house, later offices in a terrace, in red brick, with stone dressings, a sill band, and a slate roof. There are three storeys and a basement, and a symmetrical front of five bays. Steps lead up to the central doorway that has pilasters, a semicircular fanlight, an entablature and a cornice. The ground floor windows have architraves, cornices and sills on shaped brackets. In the upper floor are sash windows with wedge lintels, and at the rear is a semicircular stair window. Enclosing the basement area are wrought iron railings.	II
Mordis House and railings 53.79730°N 1.55411°W		Early 19th century	A house, later used for other purposes, it is in red brick with stone dressings, a sill band, and a slate roof. There are three storeys and a basement, and two bays. Steps lead up to the round-arched doorway in the left bay that has a fanlight, and to the right is a bow window. The other windows are sashes, and enclosing the basement are wrought iron railings with bulbous finials.	II
Templar Hotel and 6 Templar Street; 53.80010°N 1.53916°W		Early 19th century	The public house was extended later in the 19th century and remodelled in 1928. It is in brick, the ground floor clad in faience and the upper floors stuccoed, with dressings in painted stone, a modillion eaves cornice, and a concrete tile roof. There are three storeys and a basement, six bays, and a taller bay added on the corner. In the ground floor are mullioned windows with quoined surrounds, and doorways with Tudor arches, carved spandrels, and shallow fanlights, and above them is a lettered frieze. In the upper floors are sash windows, those in the first floor of the extension with segmental heads, and all in the extension with hood moulds. At the east end is a two-storey two-bay former brick brewhouse.	II
Time Ball Buildings; 53.79575°N 1.54277°W		Early 19th century	A house and shops to which ornate decoration was added in about 1972, and it has later been used for other purposes. The building has a stuccoed front, quoins, a moulded cornice on console brackets, moulded panels with lettering below the eaves, and an open parapet with finials. There are three storeys and five bays, and in the ground floor is a modern shop front with pilasters. Above, in the left bay, is a full-height bay window surmounted by a dome on which is a sphere. Cantilevered from the front is a large clock with an iron frame surmounted by a statue of Father Time. In the fourth bay is a large decorative pedimented clock case, the numbers replaced by letters, over which is a time ball enclosed in wrought iron cresting and with a weathervane. In the middle floor, flanking the clock case, are canted bay windows, and the other windows are sashes.	II*
The General Elliott Public House; 53.79709°N 1.54052°W		Early 19th century	The public house, which incorporates material from about 1700, is in rendered brick with a slate roof. There are four storeys and two bays, and a three-storey bay on the right. In the ground floor is a public house front, and above are sash windows in the main part, and small windows in the right bay.	II
West Riding Public House; 53.79635°N 1.54954°W		Early 19th century	A house on a corner site, later a public house, it is rendered, with a deep moulded eaves cornice and a slate roof. There are three storeys and a basement, two bays on the front, and nine along the left return. On the front is a doorway with plain jambs and a projecting moulded cornice, and to the left is a square bay window. The windows are paired in moulded architraves.	II
The Eagle Tavern; 53.80598°N 1.53524°W		1826	The public house is in painted brick with stone dressings, bracketed eaves, and a hipped slate roof. There are two storeys, four bays on the front, and three bays on the left return. The doorway has a moulded surround, a fanlight, and a cornice. To its left is a canted bay window, to the right is a bow window, and the other windows are sashes with wedge lintels.	II
Entrance range, Hope Foundry and Hope House; 53.80149°N 1.53156°W		1831–50	Hope House was added to the south of the entrance range in 1910. The building is in red brick with stone dressings and a slate roof. The entrance range has three storeys and two bays. The right bay contains a wide entrance and has an architrave decorated with Greek key and lion masks, and a modillion cornice, above which are four sash windows, and a band with the name of the foundry. The ground floor of the left bay projects and the upper floors have giant pilasters. Hope House to the left has two storeys, nine bays on the front, five on the left return and one on the angled corner. In the corner is a round-arched doorway with attached columns, an open segmental pediment, and a scrolled date plaque. Elsewhere, are sash windows with architraves, and some with triangular pediments.	II
Oxford Place Church, gates, gate piers, railings and wall 53.80001°N 1.55096°W		1835	The church was remodelled in 1896–1903. It is in red brick with stone dressings, rusticated sandstone bands, and a slate roof. The entrance front, which is in Baroque style, has two storeys, an attic and a basement, and a front of five bays. The entrance is approached by wide steps, and the central doorway has paired attached Ionic columns and an open pediment. The outer bays contain doorways with architraves and keystones, and above are round windows. Over the central entrance are attached Ionic columns, an entablature, and a modillion cornice, and in the outer bays are round-arched windows. Above the centre is a pedimented gable containing a circular window and dates, and it is flanked by obelisk finials. Over each of the outer bays are ball finials and a cupola. The grounds of the church are enclosed by a wall containing gate piers, and wrought iron gates and railings.	II
St George's Church; 53.80160°N 1.55326°W		1836–38	The apse was added in 1898–1900, and the spire in 2006. The church is in stone with a slate roof, and is in Gothic Revival style. It consists of a nave, an apse, and a west tower. The tower has three stages, diagonal buttresses, a west doorway with an ogee hood mould, clock faces, a plain parapet with corner pinnacles, and a slim spire. The windows along the sides are lancets, and the apse has crocketed finials.	II
Castleton Mill; 53.79635°N 1.56654°W		1838	The mill, which was later extended, is in red brick on a stone plinth, and has a slate roof. There are four storeys and 18 bays, and the windows are cross windows. At the southeast is a bowed stair turret, and the extension to the northwest has two gables, each with an oculus, one with a bellcote, the other with a finial, and from it rises a tapering octagonal chimney.	II
Former charity school 53.79990°N 1.54299°W		c. 1838	The former charity school, which was later used for other purposes, is in stone, with a moulded cornice and parapet, and a slate roof. It is in Gothic Revival style, with two storeys at the west end, and one at the east end. In the ground floor of the west end is a doorway with a pointed arch, a three-light window with a square head, and a two-light window with a pointed arch. The upper floor windows have pointed arches, and all the openings have hood moulds. Along the sides are three-light windows, and at the east end is a five-light window.	II
Templar House; 53.79929°N 1.53774°W		1840	A Methodist chapel on a corner site, later used for other purposes, it is in red brick, with stone dressings and a slate roof. There are two storeys, and a front of six bays, the outer bays projecting slightly and containing a round-arched blind recess in each floor. In the second bay, steps lead up to a doorway with pilasters, a semicircular fanlight, and an entablature with a cornice, and in the fifth bay is a similar doorway converted into a window. The other windows are round-headed, each with a moulded arch and an impost.	II
19 and 21 Cookridge Street; 53.80027°N 1.54742°W		1840–47	Offices and warehouses in orange-pink brick with stone dressings on a plinth, with giant pilasters that have moulded bases and caps, a frieze, a string course, a modillion cornice, an attic cornice, and a slate roof. There are two storeys, basements and attics, five bays, and a gabled rear wing on the right. The doorway has an architrave and a pediment on consoles, and the windows are sashes, paired in the outer bays. In the ground floor they have moulded sills, lintels and archivolts, and the windows in the upper floor have moulded sill bands.	II
23–27 Cookridge Street, 19 and 21 Great George Street and 19 and 20 Alexander Street; 53.80067°N 1.54751°W		1840–47	A block of shops, offices and warehouses on a corner site, in red brick with stone dressings. In part there are three storeys and basement, and elsewhere are four storeys. On Cookridge Street are 14 bays, with 13 bays on Great George Street, a bowed corner bay, and four-bay rear wings forming a courtyard. The ground floor is rusticated, and on Cookridge Street are shop fronts that have panelled pilasters with decorated tops, a frieze, and a dentilled cornice, and between them is an entry. On Great George Street is a doorway, and windows with arches of incised voussoirs. The corner bay contains a doorway with a fanlight, and the windows in the upper floor of both fronts are sashes.	II
Henry Moore Institute; 53.80022°N 1.54742°W		1840–47	Originally wool merchants' offices and a warehouse, it was converted into a centre for the study of sculpture in 1993. The building is in red brick with stone dressings, a stone basement, pilasters between the bays, a frieze with a moulded string course and a cornice, paired modillion gutter brackets, and a slate roof. There are three storeys and a basement, and twelve bays. Most of the windows are sashes, those in the ground floor with archivolts. At the rear are two projecting wings, a wide segmental-arched loading door, and a round-headed stair window. On The Headrow front is a 1992 façade in polished Italian black granite called 'Uba Tuba'.	II
2 Woodhouse Square; 53.80149°N 1.55611°W		1845–46	A house, later offices, at the end of a terrace, in red brick with stone dressings on a plinth, with quoins, moulded string courses between the floors and at the eaves, and a slate roof. There are two storeys and a symmetrical front of three bays. The central doorway has a moulded architrave, a fanlight, three-quarter Tuscan columns, an entablature, a cornice, and a blocking course. The windows are sashes with architraves, and under the ground floor windows are recessed panels.	II
The Swarthmore Institute; 53.80146°N 1.55637°W		1845–46	A row of three houses in a terrace, later offices, in red brick with stone dressings, on a plinth, with moulded string courses between the floors and at the eaves, a moulded cornice and blocking course, and a slate roof. There are two storeys and seven bays. Each doorway has a moulded architrave, a fanlight, pilasters, an entablature, a cornice and a blocking course. The windows are sashes with architraves, the windows in the ground floor have panels beneath, and there are two 20th-century dormers.	II
Concourse, Leeds railway station 53.79546°N 1.54786°W		1846	The station concourse and ticket office, which have been altered, are in brown brick and Portland stone. There is a single storey, seven bays and a flat roof.	II
Railway viaduct 53.79429°N 1.55966°W		c. 1846	The remaining part of the viaduct, which has been severed at both ends, crosses the River Aire and the Leeds and Liverpool Canal. It is in gritstone and about 300 metres (980 ft) long. The viaduct consists of a segmental arch over the river, then two narrow arches, an arch over the canal, one over the towpath, and about ten further arches. Its features include rusticated voussoirs, keystones, buttresses with recessed panels, a moulded modillion cornice, a parapet with vase balusters, and bollards with moulded caps.	II
Truck lifting tower 53.79576°N 1.55647°W		1846	The tower was used to lift railway wagons from one level of rails to another. It is in grey gritstone and yellow sandstone, and has rusticated dressings, a string course, and a cornice. There is a low level entrance on the north side, a high level entrance on the south side, and various other openings, and attached to it are two lettered plaques.	II
Mill Hill Chapel; 53.79676°N 1.54654°W		1847–48	A Unitarian chapel, it is in millstone grit with a slate roof, and in Gothic Revival style. There are seven bays, the central bay projecting as a transept containing a doorway with a pointed arch, above which is a large five-light window. The windows contain Perpendicular tracery, most have two lights, above them are hood moulds, and between them are buttresses. At the top is a parapet pierced with trefoils, and on the gables are cross finials.	II*
6 to 14 Great George Street including Stansfeld Chambers; 53.80097°N 1.54799°W		1848	A house and workshop, later used for other purposes, the building is in red brick with stone dressings, an eaves cornice and a blocking course, and part of the ground floor is in rusticated stone. There are three storeys, and at the front is a three-bay house, and a seven-bay office and showroom to the right. The house has an entrance with an architrave and a cornice on console brackets, and the windows are sash windows. The ground floor of the offices contains an arcade of segmental arches, the central one leading to a cobbled courtyard at the rear surrounded by former workshops. In the upper floors are pilasters between the sash windows.	II
23 and 25 Great George Street; 53.80074°N 1.54822°W		1848–49	Offices and warehouses, later used for other purposes, they are in orange-pink brick at the front, red brick at the rear, with stone dressings, the basement rusticated, sill bands, a cornice, a parapet, and a slate roof. There are four storeys and basements, and a U-shaped plan, with a front of twelve bays and rear wings. In the outer bays are doorways with architraves, dentilled cornices on consoles, and blocking courses. In front of the basement windows are iron railings, and the other windows are sashes with cambered heads. At the rear are blocked loading doors.	II
92, 94 and 96 North Street; 53.80242°N 1.53697°W		c. 1848–50	Originally the entrance to an ironworks, later offices and shops, the building is in red brick with stone dressings, on a plinth, with rusticated pilasters, cornices, and hipped slate roofs. There is a symmetrical front of eleven bays. The central three bays have three storeys, a modillion cornice, and a clock tower with a lead-clad pyramidal roof and a weathervane. In the centre is a round-arched doorway with paired pilasters and a keystone, and in the top floor are paired round-arched windows with colonnettes. The outer bays have two storeys, and in the ground floor there are elliptical-arched carriageways with ornate console brackets. In the upper floor of all bays are round-arched windows with keystones.	II
Former railway repair shop 53.79487°N 1.56290°W		1849–53	The repair shop, later used for other purposes, was built for the Leeds and Thirsk Railway. It is in red brick with stone dressings, pilasters, an eaves band, and a roof of slate and corrugated iron. It has a long rectangular plan with a single-storey, and in each bay along the sides is a round-arched window, some blocked. At the north end is a blocked doorway.	II
The Half Roundhouse; 53.79489°N 1.56370°W		1849–53	A railway repair shop converted for other uses, it is in red brick with a band, a dentilled eaves cornice, and a corrugated iron roof. There is a single storey and a semicircular plan. The bays contain segmental-arched openings, between them are pilasters, and above are small segmental-arched windows with keystones. At each end are four bays with similar windows, smaller above and taller below.	II
The Roundhouse; 53.79447°N 1.56448°W		1849–53	A railway engine house, later used for other purposes, it is in red brick on a plinth, with stone dressings, a moulded cornice and blocking course, and a slate roof. There is a single storey and a circular plan, with pilasters between the bays. The main doorway has an elliptical arch, voussoirs, a cornice, and a pediment, and each bay contains a round-arched window.	II*
66 and 68 Armley Road; 53.79623°N 1.56903°W		c. 1850	Offices and a works entrance, it is in brown brick with stone dressings, a modillion eaves cornice, and hipped slate roofs. There are two storeys, and most of the openings have round-arched heads with keystones. The main block projects and has five bays, a plinth, impost bands, and a parapet with lettering, and to the left is a lower two-bay wing. To the right is a pedestrian entry and a larger goods entry, the latter with a keystone carved with a head, and further to the right is a lower five-bay wing.	II
2 and 4 Britannia Street and 72 Wellington Street and railings 53.79660°N 1.55248°W		Mid 19th century	A warehouse later used for other purposes, it is in red brick with stone dressings, bands, and a slate roof. There are four storeys and a basement, and a U-shaped plan with a front of three bays, each bay containing three windows, and the outer bays with coped gables. In the centre is an entrance with pilasters, an entablature and a pediment, and most of the windows are flat-headed sashes. The middle window in the ground floor of the outer bays is larger with a segmental head, the one on the right bay converted into an entrance. The windows above these are in a round-arched recess, the top window with a round head. In the right return are six windows in each floor, and to the right is a doorway with pilasters, an entablature and a cornice. The basement areas are enclosed by wrought iron railings.	II
21 and 22 Commercial Street; 53.79748°N 1.54478°W		Mid 19th century	Shops and offices in stone, with rusticated quoins on the right, a moulded cornice over the first floor, string courses above, a modillion eaves cornice, and a blocking course with pierced panels and guilloché decoration. There are three storeys and three bays. In the ground floor are modern shop fronts, the middle floor contains tripartite windows, each with a segmental pediment over the centre on consoles, and an apron, and in the top floor are three-light sash windows in moulded architraves.	II
Wall and gate piers, 23 and 25 Great George Street; 53.80053°N 1.54816°W	—	Mid 19th century	The wall and gate piers at the rear of the premises are in gritstone. The wall is about 15 metres (49 ft) long and 2.5 metres (8 ft 2 in) high, with flat coping. The gate piers have a square section and pedimented capstones.	II
31 Great George Street; 53.80065°N 1.55048°W		Mid 19th century	A pair of shops on a corner site, in painted brick with a slate roof. There are two storeys, three bays on Great George Street, one on Oxford Place, and a curved corner between. In the ground floor are three doorways, one on the corner, with pilasters, and plate glass windows, and in the upper floor are sash windows.	II
33 and 33a Great George Street; 53.80071°N 1.55064°W		Mid 19th century	An office in red brick with dentilled eaves, paired gutter brackets, and a slate roof. There are three storeys and a slightly angled front of four bays. At the right of the ground floor is a doorway with a fanlight, and to the left is a shop front with a fascia and cornice. In the upper floors are sash windows with slightly cambered heads.	II
35–41 Great George Street and 8 Oxford Row; 53.80077°N 1.55079°W		Mid 19th century	Shops and offices on a corner site in Gothic Revival style, the building is in red brick and stone, partly painted, with a moulded eaves frieze, and a slate roof. There are three storeys and attics, three gables, and a tapering turret on the corner with a wrought iron crest. In the ground floor are 14 pointed arches with hood moulds, and engaged columns with foliate capitals containing doorways and windows. Above the windows in the middle floor are arches with quatrefoils in the tympani, and in the top floor are paired windows.	II
1 Oxford Place; 53.80025°N 1.55062°W		Mid 19th century	A shop, later an office, in brick with stone dressings, a sill band, and a grey slate roof. There are two storeys and two bays. In the ground floor is a doorway with pilasters, an entablature and a shallow pediment, to the right is a shop window with pilasters, an entablature and a cornice, and to the left is a narrow window. The windows in the upper floor have slightly cambered heads.	II
2 Oxford Place; 53.80031°N 1.55060°W		Mid 19th century	A shop, later an office, in brick with stone dressings, a sill band, gutter brackets, and a slate roof. There are two storeys and two bays. The doorway in the left bay has pilasters, a cornice on console brackets, and a fanlight, and to its left is a narrow gateway. To the right is a shop window with pilasters, an entablature and a cornice, and in the upper floor are sash windows.	II
3 Oxford Place; 53.80037°N 1.55057°W		Mid 19th century	A shop, later an office, in brick with stone dressings, a sill band, and a slate roof. There are two storeys and two bays. The doorway in the left bay has pilasters, an entablature and a shallow pediment, to the right is a shop window with pilasters, an entablature and a cornice, and in the upper floor are sash windows.	II
Three bollards, Hirst's Yard; 53.79573°N 1.54163°W		Mid 19th century	The three bollards are in front of Nos. 11, 12 and 13. They are in cast iron, and each bollard has triple roll moulding near the base, a bulbous body, and a ball finial.	II
Bollard, City Art Gallery; 53.80043°N 1.54785°W		Mid 19th century	The bollard is at the northeast corner of the art gallery. It is in cast iron and about 0.75 metres (2 ft 6 in) high. The bollard is squat, and has a moulded base, a tapering shaft, a moulded capital, and a flattened ball finial.	II
Bollard, Oxford Place; 53.80066°N 1.55039°W		Mid 19th century	The bollard is at the junction of Oxford Place with Great George Street. It is in cast iron and about 1 metre (3 ft 3 in) high. The bollard has moulding at the base and the neck, and a flattened ball top.	II
Bollard, Swan Street; 53.79892°N 1.54326°W		Mid 19th century	The bollard is at the west end of Swan Street at its junction with Lands Lane. It is in cast iron and about 0.45 metres (1 ft 6 in) high. The bollard is set in concrete, and in the form of a baluster, with a moulded waist and top, and a ball finial.	II
Churchill House; 53.79611°N 1.55027°W		Mid 19th century	A warehouse, later offices, in red brick with a rusticated stone basement, stone dressings, a pilaster on the right with carved panels, a moulded cornice over the ground floor, a modillion eaves cornice, and a slate roof. There are four storeys and a basement, and seven bays. The central doorway has paired columns, a circular fanlight, and paterae in the spandrels. In the basement are flat-headed windows, in the ground floor the windows have pointed arches. The windows in the first and second floors have segmental-arched heads, those in the first floor with keystones, and in the top floor they are paired with round heads and colonnettes between.	II
Gas lamp post, Bay Horse Yard; 53.79853°N 1.54149°W	—	Mid 19th century	The gas lamp post is in cast iron and is about 3 metres (9.8 ft) high. It has a moulded base, the shaft is fluted, and tapers to a collar with two ladder arms, and the lamp has a ventilator.	II
Gas lamp post, Ship Yard; 53.79831°N 1.54281°W	—	Mid 19th century	The gas lamp post is in cast iron and is about 3 metres (9.8 ft) high. It has a moulded base, the shaft is fluted, and tapers to a collar with two ladder arms, and the lamp has a ventilator.	II
Churchyard wall and gateway, Mill Hill Chapel; 53.79674°N 1.54679°W		Mid 19th century	The boundary wall and the gateway are in gritstone, the overall length about 50 metres (160 ft). The gateway has a chamfered pointed arch with a hood mould under a gable. The flanking walls have a balustrade with pierced cusping.	II
Boundary wall and railings, St George's Church; 53.80128°N 1.55302°W	—	Mid 19th century	The low wall enclosing the churchyard is in stone with moulded coping, and extends for about 70 metres (230 ft). The railings are in wrought iron, and are stepped up on the east side to an inserted gateway.	II
The Three Legs Public House; 53.79886°N 1.54051°W		Mid 19th century	The public house is in brick faced with faience and terracotta, and has a modillion eaves cornice, a strapwork parapet with urns, and a slate roof. There are three storeys and five bays. The central doorway is arched, it is flanked by wide arched windows, and above it is an oriel window with a curved balustrade. The outer bays contain paired windows, in the middle floor they have segmental heads with keystones, and in the top floor they have flat heads. The areas over the doorway and ground floor windows and under the oriel window are decorated, and over the ground floor is a lettered frieze.	II
Moorlands House; 53.79751°N 1.54497°W		1852–55	Offices on a corner site, later used for other purposes, they are in stone. There are two storeys, an attic and a basement, and three bays on each front. The plinth and ground floor have vermiculated rustication, and in the centre of the Albion Street front is a round-arched doorway with carving in the tympanum. The ground floor windows are Venetian with moulded impost bands and carved keystones. Above is a dentilled cornice, and in the upper floor are giant paired Corinthian columns, an entablature, a frieze with festoons and masks, balconies, and windows with segmental pediments on console brackets. Over this is another dentilled cornice, in the attic are windows with paired pilasters, and at the top is a cornice and a balustraded parapet with urns.	II
Town Hall; 53.80016°N 1.54972°W		1852–58	The town hall was designed by Cuthbert Brodrick, and is built in millstone grit with roofs of slate and lead. There are two storeys and a basement, and it has a rectangular plan with projecting wings. On each front is a rusticated base, and an order of giant Corinthian columns and pilasters carrying an entablature and a balustrade with urns. The front is approached by a wide flight of stone steps flanked by two plinths with lions in Portland stone sculpted by John Thomas. All the windows have round-arched heads. On the top is a clock tower that has a square colonnade of 21 Corinthian columns carrying a pulvinated frieze, a dentilled cornice, and a balustrade with urns and corner finials. On each front is a clock face, and above is an elongated lead-clad dome surmounted by a cupola.	I
City Varieties; 53.79898°N 1.54284°W		1855	A music hall theatre incorporating the remains of an 18th-century inn, it is in rendered brick with a slate roof. The theatre block has three storeys and seven bays, and the remains of the inn have four storeys and two bays. The main entrance is in the former inn, and has a segmental arch and a moulded semicircular arch above, and in the upper storeys are windows of varying types. On the front of the theatre block are a canopy, round-arched recesses, and bracketed eaves. Inside is a long auditorium, two tiers of bow-fronted balconies on Corinthian columns and a proscenium arch over which are the royal arms.	II*
Former Methodist New Connexion chapel 53.80174°N 1.54574°W		1857–58	The chapel was designed by William Hill, and has since been used for other purposes. It is in red brick with stone dressings, rusticated corner pilasters, a bracketed cornice, a full-width pediment containing a round window and foliage in relief, and a slate roof. There are two storeys and a basement, a front of five bays, and seven bays on the sides. In the outer bays are doorways with Corinthian pilasters, semicircular fanlights, and an entablature, and between them are round-arched windows. In the middle of the upper storey is a round-arched window with carved impost blocks and a keystone, and the outer bays contain tall metal-framed windows.	II
19 Wellington Street and railings 53.79615°N 1.55052°W		1859	A warehouse, later offices, in red and polychrome brick, the basement in rusticated stone, with stone dressings, a moulded modillion eaves cornice, and a slate roof. There are four storeys and a basement, and seven bays. Steps lead up to the central doorway that has a Moorish arch, columns with carved capitals, and a circular fanlight with the date and initials. The ground floor contains an arcade of arched windows. Above the ground floor is a cornice, projecting over the doorway, and the first and second floors contain segmental-arched windows with architraves, keystones, and moulded sills on brackets. In the attic are paired round-arched windows with circular windows above and polychrome arches. In front of the basement area is a cast iron balustrade with circular panels and vase finials.	II
67 and 67A Burley Street; 53.80081°N 1.56331°W		c. 1860	The vicarage was designed by G. E. Street in Gothic Revival style, and has since been used for other purposes. It is in stone and has a slate roof with coped gables. There are two storeys, an attic and a basement, and an asymmetrical plan. The doorway has a pointed arch, the windows are mullioned and transomed, and there are three dormers.	II
Gresham House; 53.79787°N 1.55022°W		c. 1860	A warehouse, later offices, the ground floor is in stone, above it is in red brick, with a bracketed cornice over the ground floor, sill bands above, and a moulded eaves cornice. There are four storeys and a basement, and six bays. The basement windows have segmental heads and iron grills. In the ground floor is an arcade of Moorish arches containing recessed windows flanked by granite columns with carved capitals and spandrels. The doorway has paired columns and a circular fanlight containing decorative ironwork. The first and second floors contain round-arched windows, and in the top floor are paired round-arched windows, with columns and impost bands.	II
Corn Exchange; 53.79599°N 1.54017°W		1860–62	The corn exchange, which was converted into a shopping centre in 1989–90, was designed by Cuthbert Brodrick. It is in millstone grit with a grey slate dome, moulded bands, a frieze, a dentilled cornice, and a parapet with a clock, a coat of arms, and an inscription with the date. There are two storeys and a basement, and an oval plan. The three entrances have semicircular arcaded porches with attached Tuscan columns and a cornice, and in both floors are round-arched sash windows.	I
Blemann House, King's House and railings 53.79647°N 1.55085°W		1861	A former warehouse on a corner site designed by George Corson, it has a stone basement, a rusticated ground floor, and above it is in red brick, with dressings in polychrome brick and stone, a cornice over the ground floor, a modillion eaves cornice, and a slate roof. There are four storeys and a basement, 14 bays on Wellington Street and eight on King Street, and the bays near the corner project slightly. The entrance on the corner has columns with foliate capitals and a cornice. The windows in the ground floor have round-arched heads, in the first and second floor are a mix of segmental and flat-headed windows, and between the floors is a decorative band. The top floor contains paired windows with baluster shafts and circular openings in an arcade of polychrome brickwork. Near the corner is a square tower with a pyramidal roof, and the basement area is enclosed by railings with geometric openwork.	II
Sovereign House; 53.79938°N 1.54726°W		1862–64	A bank, later offices and a public house, it is in sandstone with a slate roof. The building has three storeys and a basement, and an added storey in the roof. There are similar fronts on South Parade, Park Row and The Headrow, and on the corners are curved bays. The main entrance has a porch with paired fluted columns, an entablature with a triglyph frieze. The ground floor is rusticated, it contains flat-headed windows, and above it is a frieze with a Greek key pattern. The upper floors contain rusticated pilasters, and sash windows, those in the first floor with alternate triangular and segmental pediments. At the top is a modillion cornice, and a balustraded parapet with urns.	II
17A East Parade; 53.79927°N 1.54938°W		1863	An auction house, later used for other purposes, it was designed by George Corson in Gothic Revival style. It is in sandstone, with a decorated frieze between the floors, and a slate roof. There are two storeys and a basement and three gabled bays. In the left bay is an arched entrance with polished granite columns and lettering in the arch, and above are decorated and dated plaques. To the right are arched windows flanked by polished granite columns with carved capitals. The upper floor contains an arcade of three arched windows with marble pilaster shafts and carved imposts, and in the gable are circular windows.	II
Leeds Club and railings 53.79803°N 1.54433°W		1863	The club building is in stone with a modillion cornice, a balustered parapet and a slate roof. There are three storeys and a basement, and seven bays. In the second bay is a porch with paired Ionic columns and an entablature with a cornice extending over the ground floor. The ground floor windows have round-arched heads, pilasters, impost bands, and keystones. The flat-headed windows in the middle floor have architraves and cornice hoods on console brackets., and in the top floor are small round-arched windows with moulded architraves, keystones and string courses. Enclosing the basement area are cast iron railings.	II*
Wall, railings, gates and gate piers, Leeds General Infirmary; 53.80122°N 1.55183°W	—	1863–68	The boundary wall and railings were designed by George Gilbert Scott. The wall is in brick with stone moulding, and the railings are in wrought iron. The gate piers are in brick, the main piers are square, and have corner shafts with foliate capitals, and gabled capstones, the inner piers are more elaborate, and the other piers have crocketed finials.	II
Brodrick's Buildings; 53.80196°N 1.54744°W		1864	Shops and chambers resigned by Cuthbert Brodrick in red brick with stone dressings and a slate roof. There are three storeys and attics, and two gabled bays. In the ground floor are shop fronts with recessed entrances. The middle floor has four-light windows with flat heads and pilasters with carved capitals, and in front are cast iron balconies. In the top floor are sash windows with pointed blind arches above and a quatrefoil panel at the centre, and in the gable are square windows with triangular surrounds.	II
Original building and pavilion wing, Leeds General Infirmary; 53.80157°N 1.55180°W		1864–68	The original building was designed by George Gilbert Scott, and the pavilion wing was added in 1889–92 by George Corson. Both parts are in Gothic Revival style, and are in red brick with stone dressings and slate roofs. The original building consists of a closed court with a carriage entrance on the west side, a chapel on the east side, and three parallel wings. Corson's wing is parallel to the east side, and joined to the main building by a single-storey link. The main entrance block has three storeys and an attic, and five bays, the middle three bays projecting under a gable, and containing a porte cochère. This is flanked by single-storey five-bay arcades linked to three-storey pavilions with diagonally-projecting corner towers.	I
Former Leeds Chest Clinic and railings 53.80070°N 1.53974°W		1865	The clinic on an island site, later used for other purposes, was designed by William Hill. It is in red brick with stone dressings, on a moulded plinth, with a dentilled cornice between the storeys, a modillion eaves cornice, a balustraded parapet with urns and panels with niches, pediments with ball finials, and a hipped slate roof. There are two storeys, a front of six bays, the left three bays projecting, a curved corner, and five bays on the left return. The doorway has a porch with paired Corinthian columns, an entablature, and a balustraded balcony. The windows are round-headed with moulded arches, and continuous imposts. In front of the forecourt is a low stone wall with railings, gates, and stone gate piers with pyramidal caps.	II
Former Masonic Hall; 53.80090°N 1.54942°W		1865	Originally a Masonic Hall and an office to the left, later a public house, it is in mainly in stone, the upper part of the office is in red brick, and the roofs are slated. The former hall has two storeys and four bays. The right bay projects and contains a gabled doorway with a pointed arch, and columns, above is a round-arched window, and in the rest of the ground floor are windows and a doorway. The upper floor contains windows with pointed arches, shafts with foliate capitals, and hood moulds, and between them are plaques with Masonic symbols. At the top is a bracketed cornice, and a parapet with pierced trefoils, and in the centre is a three-stepped gable containing a panel with a six-pointed star. The former office has four storeys and an attic, and one bay. In the ground floor is a doorway and above it are windows with cusped heads, in the first floor is an ornate oriel window, the upper floors contain windows with shouldered heads, and at the top is a dormer with fleur-de-lis finials.	II
Victoria Hotel; 53.80088°N 1.54979°W		1865	The hotel is in red brick with stone dressings, a modillion cornice and a fascia board at first floor level, moulded string courses, a frieze of medallions below the second floor windows, deep bracketed eaves, and a slate mansard roof. There are four storeys and attics, and three bays. The main doorway has a shouldered arch, and moulded attached marble columns with foliate capitals, and there is a smaller doorway on the left. The windows in the first and second floors have shouldered arches, the outer windows in the first floor with marble columns, and in the attics are dormers, the middle one gabled.	II
Leeds City Museum; 53.80162°N 1.54703°W		1865–68	Originally a mechanics' institute designed by Cuthbert Brodrick, later a theatre, and then a museum, it is in gritstone and brick with a slate roof. There is a rectangular plan, with one tall storey over a basement. Steps lead up to a recessed round-arched entrance that has large pilasters, lettered friezes, and at the top is a segmental pediment containing carving, and a pavilion roof. This is flanked by ranges each containing six tall segmental-arched windows with decorated tympani, cast iron balconies, and roundels above. The whole front has an entablature, a dentilled cornice, corner pilasters, and urns. In front of the building are wrought iron railings and lamp standards.	II*
5 Albion Place; 53.79799°N 1.54383°W		1866–68	Originally the Church Institute, later converted into a shop, it was designed by Adams & Kelly in Gothic Revival style. It is built in polychrome brick with stone dressings and a slate roof. There are two storeys and a basement, five gabled bays on Albion Place, and three bays on Lands Lane under a wide gable. On Albion Place there are buttresses between the bays, in the left bay is a gabled porch, and the other bays have windows with pointed heads in the ground floor. The upper floor contains similar windows containing Decorated tracery. The Lands Lane front contains a large window with Gothic tracery in the upper floor with flanking panels.	II
14 Commercial Street; 53.79753°N 1.54407°W		1868	A shop designed by George Corson, it is in stone, and has a slate roof with three stepped gables and wrought iron finials, the central gable with a weathervane. There are three storeys and three bays. In the ground floor are modern shop fronts, and the middle floor contains an arcade of five windows, with columns that have polished shafts, and carved capitals, and a continuous hood mould. In the top floor are three two-light windows with pointed arches, a central column and a circular window in the tympanum.	II
Wall, gate pier and gates, St John's Church; 53.79974°N 1.54192°W		1868	The boundary wall to the south of the churchyard was designed by Richard Norman Shaw. It is in stone with ramped coping and railings at intervals, and is about 70 metres (230 ft) long. At the east end it is angled, and contains a gabled gateway with wrought iron gates. At the west end a chamfered terminal forms a gate pier.	II
Britannia Buildings; 53.80046°N 1.55054°W		1868	Offices in brick with a slate roof, in Gothic Revival style. There are three storeys and a basement, and three bays, the outer bays gabled. The central doorway has a pointed arch containing the name of the building, and paired attached columns, and at the top of the bay is a parapet pierced with quatrefoils. The windows have pointed arches and columns with foliate caps, with three lights in the outer bays and two in the centre bay, and in the gables are quatrefoil openings.	II
St Andrew's Chambers and railings 53.79932°N 1.54678°W		1868	An office building designed by George Corson in Italianate style. It is in sandstone with a rusticated ground floor, a dentilled cornice over the ground floor, a modillion eaves cornice, and a balustraded parapet with urns. There are three storeys and a basement, and five bays. In the left bay is a porch with granite columns, an entablature and a balustered balcony. The doorway has an elaborately carved surround and a circular fanlight. The windows in the middle floor have segmental pediments on consoles with carving in the tympanum, and carved aprons. Enclosing the basement area are cast iron railings.	II
Waterloo House; 53.79650°N 1.55162°W		1868	A warehouse, later offices, the ground floor in stone, the upper parts in polychrome red brick with stone dressings, and with a slate roof. There are four storeys, a basement and attics, and seven bays. In the sixth bay is a porch that has polished pink granite columns with carved capitals, and the ground floor windows have moulded depressed arches, and pilaster shafts with carved capitals. The first and second floors contain windows in pointed arches, and in the top floor is an arcade of 21 round-arched windows. At the top is a modillion cornice, cast iron cresting, octagonal brick finials with stone caps, and 20th-century dormers.	II
1–13 Boar Lane and 4 Trevelyan Square; 53.79587°N 1.54313°W		1869–72	A block of shops and offices designed by Thomas Ambler, in red brick with stone dressings, and a mansard roof in grey slate with pavilions. There are five storeys and a front of 13 bays. In the ground floor are shop fronts and two entrances, each with an inscribed lintel, a broken segmental pediment enclosing a cornucopia, a cartouche, and a bust. Most of the windows in the first and second floors are round-headed with pilasters and carved keystones. Some of the windows in the second floor have balconies, and in the third floor they have flat heads. At the top the parapet is pierced by dormers, with pediments, some segmental, and the others triangular and open.	II
3 The Bourse; 53.79570°N 1.54473°W		1869–72	A bank on a corner site, later used for other purposes, it is in stone with a cornice on each floor, a modillion eaves cornice, a pierced parapet, and a slate roof. There are four storeys and attics, three bays in Boar Lane, five on The Bourse, and a curved bay on the corner. The openings have round arches, and the doorways have engaged columns in polished granite with foliate capitals, and fanlights. Between the windows are pilasters carved with swags and granite columns with carved capitals. In the attics are two-light windows, each with a segmental pediment and a scrolled finial.	II
1 The Bourse; 53.79533°N 1.54446°W		1869–75	A shop and office in stone on a corner site, with dentilled cornices over the first floor and at the eaves, a balustraded parapet, and a grey slate roof. There are three storeys and fronts of three bays. In the ground floor are shop windows, and the upper floors contain round-arched windows with panelled pilasters and a moulded impost band. In the right return is a two-storey round-headed oriel window with a pedimented gable.	II
Ambler House; 53.79579°N 1.54391°W		1869–75	A block of shops and offices in stone with a slate roof. There are four storeys and attics, a front of five bays, and four bays on the sides. In the ground floor are modern shop fronts. In the first and second floor of the middle bay are round-headed windows with pilasters, a first-floor cornice and a second floor triangular pediment. The top floor contains windows with shouldered heads and a balustered sill, above which is a dormer and a pavilion roof. In the flanking bays the first and second floor windows are round-arched, in the second floor with a balustrade, and the windows in the outer bays and in the top floor, other than the middle bay, are square headed. On the splayed corners are oriel windows with spires.	II
31 to 34 Albion Place with railings and gas light 53.79779°N 1.54427°W		1870	Court buildings converted for other uses, the ground floor is in rusticated stone, and above, it is in red brick with stone dressings. The left part has two storeys and five bays, to the right is a section with two storeys, an attic and a basement and four bays, and the right part has three storeys and a basement and three bays. The three entrances have Doric porches, each with an entablature and a balustrade. The windows in the ground floor and the upper floor of the first part have round arches and keystones. In the first floor of the middle part the windows have pediments and in the right part they have cornices on consoles. The basement areas are enclosed by cast iron railings and gates, and attached to the southwest corner is a gas light with a scrolled bracket.	II
61 and 62 Boar Lane; 53.79597°N 1.54454°W		c. 1870	A pair of shops and offices in rusticated stone, with a dentilled cornice over the first floor, plain cornices above, and at the top a parapet, a balustrade, and a slate roof. There are four storeys and two bays. In the ground floor is a modern shop front with fluted cast iron columns. Above are paired casement windows with architraves, pilasters with carved capitals, and patterned panels. In the second floor the windows have cast iron balustrades.	II
63 Boar Lane; 53.79599°N 1.54435°W		c. 1870	A warehouse on a corner site, later a shop, it is in rusticated stone, with a dentilled cornice over the first floor, plain cornices above, and at the top a parapet, a balustrade, and a slate roof. There are four storeys, three bays on Boar Lane, two on Bank Street, and a curved bay on the corner. In the ground floor is a modern shop front with rusticated stone pillars. The upper floors contain windows that have pilasters with ornate capitals, and patterned panels. In the second floor two pairs of windows have cast iron balustrades.	II
71 Boar Lane; 53.79616°N 1.54311°W		c. 1870	A shop and offices on a corner site, it is stuccoed, with giant pilasters in the upper floors, a modillion cornice, a parapet with cast iron cresting, and a hipped slate roof. There are four storeys, five bays on the front, four on the left return, and a curved bay on the corner. In the ground floor is a modern shop front, in the first and second floors are round-headed windows with attached moulded columns, those in the second floor with voussoirs. In the top floor are flat-headed windows with fluted pilasters and carved wreaths between.	II
9 East Parade; 53.79861°N 1.54954°W		c 1870	Originally offices, later used for other purposes, the building is in stone with three storeys and a basement, and three bays. Steps lead up to a doorway in the left bay with a segmental arch, a fanlight, and attached columns and pilasters with carved capitals. In the ground and middle floors are arcades of windows with moulded round arches, pilaster shafts and carved capitals. Over the ground floor is an entablature with carved frieze, and a similar frieze over the middle floor. The windows in the top floor have shouldered heads, and above is a modillion cornice with lions' heads at the ends, and an arcaded parapet with urns and a central lettered panel surmounted by a statue of Britannia and a lion.	II
42, 44 and 46 Park Place; 53.79743°N 1.55129°W		1870	Warehouses, later offices, designed by George Corson in Gothic Revival style. The ground floor is in stone, above is red brick with stone dressings, bands, and a slate roof. The building consists of a central block with three storeys and two gabled bays, flanked by four-storey blocks with three bays each. In the ground floor are five hooded openings containing doors or windows, the left one surmounted by a beast, between them are windows with cusped lights, and at the right end is a cart entrance. The outer blocks contain windows with pointed heads in the first and second floors, in the top floor are paired flat-headed windows, above which are bracketed cornices and parapets. The windows in the upper floors of the central block have flat heads, with panels between the floors and polychrome arched recesses in the top floor. Some windows are paired and flanked by pilasters that rise to gabled plaques.	II
1 and 2 York Place, railings and bollard 53.79684°N 1.55103°W		c. 1870	A warehouse that has a basement in stone with vermiculated rustication, the upper parts are in red brick with stone dressings, a dentilled cornice over the ground floor, a bracketed eaves cornice, and a slate roof. There are four storeys and a basement, and seven bays. In each outer bay is a round-arched doorway with a moulded architrave, carved spandrels and frieze, and a pediment. The ground floor windows have round arches, moulded surrounds and decoration in the aprons. The windows above are contained in each bay in a round-headed arch, with carved panels between. Enclosing the basement area are cast iron railings with ornate panels, and to the left is a cast iron bollard.	II
30 York Place and railings 53.79727°N 1.55254°W		c. 1870	Offices and a warehouse with a stone ground floor and basement, the basement rusticated, the upper parts in red and polychrome brick with stone dressings, string courses, a carved corbelled cornice, a parapet pierced with trefoils, and a slate roof. There are five storeys and a basement, and three bays. Steps lead up to a central doorway that has a pointed arch on pink granite columns with carved capitals, and a gable with crockets. In the outer bays are two-light windows with granite columns and hood moulds, the first and second floors contain two-light windows with depressed arches, and in the third floor the windows have pointed arches. The top floor contains three-light windows, the middle window under a crocketed gable. Enclosing the basement area are cast iron railings.	II
Devonshire House and Lion House; 53.79712°N 1.55147°W		1870	Warehouses, later offices, designed by George Corson in Gothic Revival style. The ground floor is in stone, above is red brick with stone dressings, and a slate roof. The building consists of an inner block of three storeys and five bays, and outer blocks of four storeys and three bays. The outer bays contain doorways with cusped hoods surmounted by carved beasts. The ground floor windows are paired with cusped heads and colonnettes between, and are in moulded recesses with polychrome tiles below, and a beaded cornice above. At the top are bracketed eaves cornices and parapets. In the centre block the windows are in arched recesses, and at the top is a pierced parapet and gargoyles.	II
Queen's House and railings 53.79635°N 1.54929°W		c. 1870	An office building, the basement and ground floor in stone, the upper parts in red brick with stone dressings, and the ground floor rusticated. It has moulded sill bands, a moulded frieze at eaves level, and a parapet. There are four storeys and a basement, and three bays. Steps lead up to the central arched doorway that has a tall fanlight, an impost band, a cornice, and a pediment. The windows have round arches, and between the first floor windows are rosettes. Enclosing the basement area are wrought iron railings with Art Nouveau features.	II
60 Boar Lane; 53.79593°N 1.54468°W		c. 1872	A shop and offices in stone, with carved end pilasters, an entablature with paterae, a dentilled eaves cornice, a blocking course, and a slate roof. There are four storeys and each of the upper floors has five windows. In the ground floor is a modern shop front. The first and second floors contain an arcade of round-arched sash windows with columns and keystones, and in the top floor are square windows.	II
Griffin Hotel; 53.79573°N 1.54581°W		c. 1872	The hotel on a corner site was designed by Thomas Ambler in Gothic Reveal style. It is in red brick with stone dressings, moulded string courses, a corbelled cornice, a parapet with quatrefoil panels and finials, and a slate pavilion roof. There are five storeys and attics, three bays on Boar Lane, five on Mill Hill, and an angled bay on the corner. The corner bay contains a two-storey oriel window, above which is a clock face with letters in place of numbers. On the Mill Hill front is a blocked round-arched doorway that has pilaster shafts with carved capitals and finials, between which is carving, including a griffin, and above is a two-storey oriel window. In the ground floor are shop fronts with iron cresting above, and the upper floors contain round-arched windows with two or three lights.	II
Victoria Buildings; 53.79566°N 1.54514°W		c. 1872	A warehouse, offices and shops on a corner site, later used for other purposes, it is in stone, with sill bands, a dentilled cornice, and a parapet with open circles. There are four storeys, eight bays on Boar Lane, three on New Station Street, and one on the canted corner. At the top of the corner bay is a pedimented niche containing a statue of Queen Victoria. In the ground floor are windows and doorways divided by panelled pilasters. The windows in the upper floors have architraves, some decorated, and some in the first floor with triangular pediments.	II
29 Boar Lane; 53.79568°N 1.54544°W		c. 1873	A public house on a corner site, later used for various purposes, it is in orange brick with stone dressings, a modillion cornice, and an elaborate corner pediment. There are four storeys, three bays on Boar Lane, four on Mill Hill, and a curved bay on the corner. In the ground floor are windows and a doorway with segmental heads, and on the right is a round-arched carriageway. The first floor contains arcades of round-arched windows with pilasters and keystones, and in the corner bay is a Venetian window. In the second floor are paired round-arched windows with cast iron decoration in the tympanum, and the top floor has windows with segmental heads.	II
56 Wellington Street and railings 53.79653°N 1.55136°W		1873	An office building in stone, with a slate roof, four storeys and basement, and four bays. The right bay is canted, and has a turret with an octagonal spire and gargoyles. In the ground floor is a doorway with a pointed arch, above which is a gable containing two windows and a quatrefoil, and a balustrade. The upper floors contain three-light windows. Over the left three bays is a coped gable. Each floor contains a pair of windows in each bay, those in the top floor with pointed arches, the middle window taller, and all with hood moulds. In the gable are quatrefoil plaques and the date, and it is surmounted by a crocketed finial. Enclosing the basement area is a low stone wall, wrought iron railings and a gate.	II
58 Boar Lane and 2 and 4 Albion Street; 53.79593°N 1.54486°W		c. 1875	A shop, offices and workshop on a corner site, the building is in stone and brick, with a dentilled eaves cornice and a blocking course. There are four storeys, one bay on Boar Lane, three on Albion Street, and a curved bay on the corner. In the ground floor is a modern shop front, and the first floor is faced with tiles and contains Art Deco-style three-light windows. In the second floor are round arched windows with architraves, attached columns and keystones, and the top floor windows have flat heads.	II
The Horse and Trumpet Hotel; 53.79907°N 1.54253°W		c. 1875	The public house is in red brick on a plinth, with a sandstone ground floor and dressings, quoins, and a Welsh slate roof. There are three storeys and cellars, and three bays. The central doorway has a quoined surround, granite pilasters, a transom with carved grapes, a fanlight with a segmental carved arch, a keystone with a carved head, and foliated spandrels. Above this is a lettered frieze and a dentilled pediment containing a sculpture of a horse and a trumpet, and this is flanked by paired round-arched windows. In the upper floors the central window has a single light, and the outer bays have two-light windows. In the middle floor the windows have shaped architraves, carved lintels, and panelled aprons with rosettes. The top floor windows are round-headed and have triangular-headed lintels with sunk carvings.	II
4 Albion Place and railings 53.79800°N 1.54409°W		Late 19th century	An office building later used for other purposes, it is in red brick with stone dressings, a sill band, a modillion eaves cornice, a balustraded parapet, and a slate roof. There are four storeys and a basement, and four bays. The entrance in the left bay has Tuscan columns, an entablature, and a balustraded balcony. The ground floor windows have architraves and keystones. In the first floor the windows have moulded architraves, and segmental pediments on console brackets, and the second floor windows are smaller with architraves. Enclosing the basement area are cast iron railings.	II
59 Boar Lane; 53.79594°N 1.54479°W		Late 19th century	A shop and offices in stone with a slate mansard roof, four storeys and an attic, and one bay. In the ground floor is a modern shop front, and each of the upper floors contains three sash windows with architraves. In the second floor they have segmental-arched heads and keystones, the middle window with a segmental pediment, and those in the top floor with pilasters. At the top is a dormer containing a lunette, a shallow triangular pediment, and a palmette finial.	II
16 Park Place; 53.79793°N 1.55278°W		Late 19th century	Offices in red brick and terracotta, with three storeys and a basement, and a symmetrical front of five bays. The ground floor is entirely faced in decorative relief terracotta tiles, and the central doorway has a large moulded round arch, a fanlight, decorated spandrels, and a keystone. The windows are sashes, those in the lower two floors with alternating triangular and segmental pediments.	II
14, 16 and 18 St Paul's Street; 53.79815°N 1.55012°W		Late 19th century	A warehouse on a corner site, later used for other purposes, it is in red brick with stone dressings, deep eaves with large paired brackets, and a hipped slate roof. There are three storeys, nine bays on the front, and three on the left return. In the ground floor are continuous moulded arches with hood moulds, containing windows, and doorways with fanlights. The middle floor contains windows with Gothic cusped arches and carved foliage in the tympani, between which are pilasters with carved capitals. The windows in the top floor have moulded segmental arches.	II
Gas lamp post between 3 and 4 Queen Square; 53.80381°N 1.54549°W		Late 19th century	The gas lamp post is in cast iron. It has a moulded base, a tapering fluted shaft, and a restored lantern with a ventilator.	II
Gas lamp post between 10 and 11 Queen Square; 53.80378°N 1.54509°W		Late 19th century	The gas lamp post is in cast iron. It has a moulded base, a tapering fluted shaft, and a restored lantern with a ventilator.	II
Gas lamp post between 16 and 17 Queen Square; 53.80354°N 1.54467°W		Late 19th century	The gas lamp post is in cast iron. It has a moulded base, a tapering fluted shaft, and a restored lantern with a ventilator.	II
Gas lamp post between 21 and 22 Queen Square; 53.80332°N 1.54559°W		Late 19th century	The gas lamp post is in cast iron. It has a moulded base, a tapering fluted shaft, and a restored lantern with a ventilator.	II
Northwood House; 53.80710°N 1.53535°W		Late 19th century	A bank on a corner site, later used for other purposes, it is in stone with a slate roof. There are two storeys and attics, four bays on the east side, two on the west, and a curved bay on the corner. In the corner bay is a doorway with a moulded surround, a keystone and console brackets, and above are paired oval windows. Over this is a window in an architrave with a scrolled pediment, an eaves cornice, and a clock turret with an ogee dome and a ball finial. The ground floor windows are in recessed arches, and have mullions and transoms. Above is a string course, and first floor windows and dormers, all with pediments.	II
St James' Hall and Westminster Buildings; 53.79664°N 1.53816°W	centreboa	1877	A range of buildings on an island site designed by Thomas Ambler, later used for other purposes. They are in red brick with dressings in polychrome brick and stone. There are four storeys and eight bays, and canted corners at the ends. In the upper floors are windows of varying types and with different styles of decoration.	II
Grand Theatre; 53.80001°N 1.54116°W		1877–78	The theatre, shops and former assembly rooms were designed mainly by George Corson. They have since been altered, and are in brick with stone dressings and a slate roof. On the left is the theatre entrance that has three storeys and contains four arches, a balustrade above the ground floor, an arcade of round-arched windows above, and at the top is a gable containing a rose window flanked by turrets. To the right is a lower range with four storeys and six bays. In the ground floor are shops, and above are windows of varying types. To the right is the entrance to the former assembly rooms. The ground floor is rendered and contains an entrance with a flat arch over which is fan decoration, and a moulded outer arch. Above this are swags and a central plaque, three round-arched windows, and a pyramidal roof. The interior of the theatre is ornate.	II*
Thornton's Arcade; 53.79874°N 1.54287°W		1877–78	A shopping arcade in brick with stone dressings and roofs of slate and glass. The entrance from Briggate has three storeys and three bays. The entry has pilasters and a pointed arch with the name in the tympanum. It is flanked by shop fronts, and above, it rises higher than the outer bays and has a corbelled and carved cornice and a pavilion roof. The windows in the upper floors are recessed and have three lights divided by polished granite colonnettes with foliate capitals; in the middle floor they have flat heads, in the top floor they have pointed heads, and above those in the outer bays are plaques with carved heads.	II
St Paul's House, railings and gates 53.79850°N 1.55259°W		1878	A warehouse on an island site designed by Thomas Ambler in Hispano-Moorish style, and later used for other purposes, it is in red and pink brick with terracotta dressings. There are four storeys and an added attic storey, and fronts of twelve and five bays, and an angled entrance bay. In the entrance bay, the doorway has been converted into a window, and has a Moorish arch with paired flanking columns and the walls are lined with glazed tiles. The ground floor contains tall windows with segmental heads, and in the first and second floor the windows have two lights divided by Moorish colonnettes as mullions. In the top floor are triple windows with Moorish arches, and at the top is a parapet with cinquefoil piercings. At the corners are buttresses that rise to elaborate finials in the style of minarets. Enclosing the area around the building are piers in brick and stone, between which are cast iron panels with star motifs.	II*
Leeds Central Library and railings 53.80027°N 1.54885°W		1878–84	The Municipal Buildings, later occupied by the public library, were designed by George Corson. The building is in stone, the basement rusticated, with a balustraded parapet and a grey slate roof. There are three storeys, a basement and attic, and a front of five bays, the outer and middle bays projecting. The main entrance is flanked by Corinthian columns, the windows in the lower two floors are round-headed, and divided by paired columns, and in the top floor they are flat-headed with pilasters. Surmounting the middle bay is an octagonal pavilion, and on the outer bays are segmental-arched dormers with urn finials. Enclosing the basement areas are cast iron railings with a geometric design and owl finials.	II*
Civic Court and railings 53.80066°N 1.54885°W		1879–81	Originally the offices of the Leeds School Board, it was designed by George Corson. The building is in stone, the basement rusticated, with an entablature, and a balustered parapet with urns, and the roof is in grey slate and lead. There are two storeys, a basement and attics, a front of five bays, the middle bay projecting, and ten bays on the sides. The entrance has a round arch and is flanked by paired fluted Corinthian columns, and niches containing statues. At the top of the bay is an attic pavilion with an octagonal roof, and a plaque lettered and carved with a coat of arms. The ground floor windows are round-arched with similar columns and carved spandrels, and the windows in the upper floor are rectangular. In the left return the left four bays project, and there is a stair turret with a pavilion roof. The railings enclosing the basement areas are in cast iron and have geometric patterns.	II*
2 The Bourse; 53.79554°N 1.54434°W		c. 1880	A warehouse and offices in stone, with moulded cornices in each floor, pilasters, moulded impost bands, and a grey slate roof. It is in Italianate style, and has three storeys and attics, and nine bays. The doorway in the fourth bay has a moulded architrave and a rectangular fanlight, and in the sixth bay is a round-headed doorway with fluted pilasters and a keystone. The ground floor windows have moulded architraves with scroll decoration, in the middle floor they are rectangular with moulded heads, and the top floor contains round-headed windows with keystones.	II
Backawell House; 53.79626°N 1.54102°W		c. 1880	A shop and offices with a steel frame and brick cladding. There are four storeys and two bays, and at the top are brick corbels, a stone band, and a shallow pediment containing a circular plaque with lettering. In the ground floor is a modern shop front, and above, each bay contains a full-height semicircular-arched recess containing three tiers of canted bay windows. The top windows have triangular pediments, and behind them is a giant fanlight.	II
Former Coliseum Theatre; 53.80232°N 1.54722°W		1885	A theatre, later used for other purposes, it is in stone at the front, brick at the sides and rear, and has a slate roof. There is a symmetrical front of five bays. The middle bay is gabled, and contains an entrance with a carved arch, and above it are carved panels, a large rose window, and a panelled parapet with a statue of Britannia on the apex. The flanking bays each has a smaller round-arched doorway and round arched windows, above is a three-light window with an arched hood mould and a balcony. At the top the inner part has a pilaster rising to a turret with a swept roof and a finial, at the outer part is a small octagonal turret with a conical roof, and between them is a panelled parapet. The outer bays are gabled and plainer.	II
New York Buildings; 53.79667°N 1.53917°W		c. 1885	A range of shops and storerooms in brick with stone dressings, slate roofs, and four storeys, with shop windows in the ground floor. The part on the left has three bays on the front, one on the left return, and a curved bay on the corner between. It has a bracketed eaves cornice, and three gables with small kneelers and copings. The next part has two bays, with round-arched windows in the first floor and segmental-headed windows in the second floor, all with keystones. The right part has eight bays, the windows in the first floor are in recessed round arches with moulded tiles in the tympani, and workshop windows in the roof.	II
Monk Bridge; 53.79361°N 1.55854°W		1886	The bridge carries Whitehall Road over the river Aire and the Leeds and Liverpool Canal. It is in cast iron and consists of a lattice girder with a span of 33 metres (108 ft) over the river, and another span over the canal with segmental-arched girders. The large abutments are in gritstone with capstones and a large fielded panel on the outside, and on the inside of the bridge is the Leeds coat of arms in a circular panel with vermiculated spandrels.	II
City Art Gallery and Henry Moore Centre; 53.80012°N 1.54823°W		1886–88	The building, which was altered and extended in the 20th century, is in stone with a roof of slate and lead, and has two storeys. It contains mullioned and transomed windows with pilasters between. At the front are steps and a ramp, and the statue of a reclining woman by Henry Moore.	II
10–20 Duncan Street; 53.79590°N 1.54184°W		1888	A block of shops, offices and a warehouse, designed by Thomas Ambler, in brick with stone dressings, rusticated pilasters, moulded floor bands, eaves on console brackets, and a slate roof. There are four storeys and a symmetrical front of seven bays. In the ground floor are shop fronts divided by pilasters with decorative capitals, and a central carriage entrance. Above the entrance is an oriel window, and the other windows are paired, those in the second floor with segmental arches and keystones. At the top of the middle bay are the city coat of arms flanked by balustrades and a curved roof behind, In the second and sixth bays are pediments containing round windows and carving.	II
Leeds College of Art and Design, Rossington Street; 53.80158°N 1.54611°W		1888	The building, originally a boys' school, is in red brick, with details in stone and terracotta, pilasters between the bays, bands, and a slate roof. There are three storeys and a basement, and nine bays. The middle bay projects, and contains a round-arched doorway with a fanlight, pilasters on corniced bases, an entablature, carving in the spandrels, a triangular pediment containing the date in the tympanum, and acroteria, and above are round-arched windows. The windows in the ground floor are flat-headed with architraves. In the middle floor the windows on the left have round heads, on the right they have flat heads with lunettes above, and in the top floor they are small and paired.	II
Block east of Thoresby Building and railings 53.80130°N 1.54549°W		1888	A school converted into offices in 1994–95, it is in red brick with stone dressings, giant Ionic columns, an entablature, a frieze, a modillion cornice, another cornice above, and a parapet with open rectangular panels. There are three storeys, attics and a basement, and a front of seven bays. The central porch has paired Ionic columns, an entablature, a balustrade, and a round-arched doorway with a rusticated surround, and the windows are sashes. The playground is enclosed by brick walls with large stone piers, paired gates and wrought iron railings with pointed finials.	II
Queen's Arcade; 53.79826°N 1.54286°W		1888–89	A block of shops and offices incorporating earlier buildings, mainly in brick, partly painted, with roofs of slate and glass. The interior has two storeys with a balcony, and the outer buildings vary in size and nature. The main front along Lands Lane is in sandstone and brick, and has three storeys and an attic, and eleven bays. There are shop fronts in the ground floor, and flat-headed windows in the first and second floors. In the top floor are segmental-headed widows flanked by columns, above is a modillion cornice, and at the top are pinnacles, and dormers with segmental pediments and finials.	II
Centaur Clothing Factory; 53.80115°N 1.55395°W		1889	A factory and offices on an island site, with a triangular plan. The building is in red brick with stone dressings and a slate roof. There are six storeys and attics, a main front of four bays and sides of eight and three bays. The entrance has fluted columns with foliate capitals, an entablature, a cornice on consoles, and a round arch with a keystone. In the corner is a massive full-height bow that has a conical roof with wrought iron openwork and a lantern. The first floor windows have segmental heads, the other have flat heads, and at the top are gables, some plain and others Dutch.	II
Corson's Outpatients' Department, Leeds General Infirmary; 53.80194°N 1.55059°W	—	1889–92	The outpatients' department and high level corridor were designed by George Corson in Gothic Revival style, and are in brick with sandstone dressings and slate roof. It includes a large rectangular waiting roof with a stepped eaves cornice and round-headed clerestory windows and roof ventilators. In front is a three-storey range with a projecting polygonal bay in the centre and a polygonal tower with a finial at the southeast corner, and on the left is a three-storey two-bay block. From the southwest corner of the waiting room runs a high-level enclosed corridor.	II
Athenaeum House; 53.79949°N 1.54862°W		c. 1890	Shops and offices in stone, with a bracketed eaves cornice, a balustraded parapet, and a slate roof. There are four storeys and an attic, and six bays. In the ground floor is an arcade of Tudor arches with doorways and windows. In the outer bays are canted bay windows in each upper floor and at the top are pavilions with hipped roofs and finials. The central bays contain four-light mullioned windows, those in the first and third floors with traceried heads, and in the second floor with transoms. Between the second floor windows are canopied niches containing statues.	II
Quebec House; 53.79675°N 1.54923°W		1890	A club on a corner site, later used for other purposes, it is in pink-red brick and red terracotta and has a slate roof. There are four storeys, a basement and attics, a front of three wide bays, the outer bays with Dutch gables, and a semi-octagonal bay on the corner. The corner bay has an open first floor, and it rises to a tower with a bracketed cornice and a spire. The doorway is in the left bay and has a round arch with a keystone, decorated spandrels, an open segmental pediment on paired brackets containing decoration in the tympanum, and a lettered frieze. The ground floor windows have segmental heads, and in the first floor they have round heads, all with decorated aprons. Between the first floor windows are Ionic columns carrying an entablature with a decorated frieze and a modillion eaves cornice. The top floor contains flat-headed windows and decorative terracotta panels.	II
19 and 21 Park Row; 53.79911°N 1.54682°W		1891	An office building designed by Alfred Waterhouse, the ground floor is in granite, above are bands of red brick and buff terracotta, pilaster strips, a modillion eaves cornice, a parapet, and a slate roof. There are four storeys and attics, and eight bays. The main entrance has a wide round rusticated arch above which are pierced balconies, a moulded frieze and a gabled dormer. In the right bay is an entrance with a segmental arch, above which is a dated plaque, and at the top is a small turret with an octagonal roof. The ground floor windows have large arches, above they are mullioned and transomed, and in the attic are dormers.	II
33, 34 and 35 Park Row and 15 Bond Court; 53.79766°N 1.54726°W		1892	An office on a corner site in stone, the ground floor rusticated, with three storeys, three bays on Park Row, 2½ on Bond Court, and a bay on the angled corner. On the corner is a doorway with polished granite pilasters, and a pediment, and the ground floor windows are round-arched with balustered panels below. In the upper floors are Corinthian half-columns, fluted near the base, and an entablature with a modillion cornice, a decorated frieze, and a balustered parapet. In the middle floor are Venetian windows, in the top floor the windows are tripartite and arched, and in both floors are balusters and moulded imposts.	II
Former Trustee Savings Bank; 53.79667°N 1.54015°W		1892	The former bank is in stone, and has two storeys and three bays. There are paired Corinthian pilasters carrying an entablature, with dentilled and moulded cornices on each floor. At the top is a central balustraded blocking course inscribed "BANK", over which is a pediment with carving in the tympanum, and surmounted by the statue of a female figure. On the corners are statues of a lion and a unicorn on pedestals. The central bays are flanked by paired Corinthian columns. In the ground floor is a doorway and windows, all round-arched with keystones, and the upper floor windows are round-headed with two lights and balustrades.	II
Former Yorkshire Bank and railings 53.79748°N 1.54892°W		1893–94	The bank was extended in 1904 and has later been used for other purposes. It is in stone with moulded string courses, a parapet with gables, and a slate roof. There are four storeys, attics and a basement, and five bays. In the ground floor of the central wide bay is an arcade of five pointed arches, and this is flanked by gabled projections containing an entrance with pointed arches, ornate gates, attached drum columns, flat oriel windows with moulded soffits above, panelled friezes, and carved panels with arched canopies below. In the middle section the first floor windows have segmental heads and four winged lions below. At the left is a staircase tower, open at the top with circular columns and moulded segmental arches, gargoyles at the corners, and a short tiled spire. The gates and the basement railings are in wrought iron.	II
23 Park Row and 119 and 121 The Headrow; 53.79943°N 1.54682°W	—	1894 (probable)	An office on a corner site later used for other purposes, only the Park Row front has survived. It is in red brick with terracotta dressings, corner pilasters, an eaves cornice, and a slate roof. There are four storeys and an attic and four bays. Steps lead up to the central doorway that has attached columns, a double-arched fanlight, and a pediment. It is flanked by plate glass windows, and the windows in the upper floors are sashes. On the left corner is a two-storey oriel turret with an octagonal ogee dome and a finial, and to the right is a three-storey oriel bow window. At the top are two Flemish gables and three moulded plaques.	II
Former Medical School, University of Leeds; 53.80197°N 1.55290°W		1894	The former medical school is in red brick with sandstone and terracotta dressings, and a slate roof. There are three storeys and an attic, and a south front of five bays. The outer bays are larger with gables and finials, and contain three-storey canted bay windows. The middle three bays have smaller gables, between the bays are buttresses rising to finials, and above the first floor windows are segmental arches. To the left is an octagonal turret with an ogee lead dome. Projecting from the east front is a tower that has a round-arched entrance with carved spandrels and moulded imposts. Above it is a canted oriel window over which is a four-light window and a coat of arms. The top stage of the tower has quoin shafts, gargoyles, a cornice with bosses, and an embattled parapet surmounted by a domed lantern with flying buttresses and a finial.	II*
Former Post Office and railings, and former Norwich Union House; 53.79673°N 1.54806°W		1896	The buildings were designed by Henry Tanner and are in stone with roofs of slate and lead. The former Post office has three storeys and attics and a front of eleven bays. The outer bays and two of the inner bays project, and have at the top a pediment flanked by domed turrets, and a pair of chimneys with arched links. The inner of these bays each contains an entrance flanked by paired Ionic columns. The middle five bays have an arcade of round-arched windows and doorways in the ground floor with a balustrade above, and at the top are dormers. On the roof is a clock tower with corner urns and an octagonal domed cupola. The former Norwich Union House on the left return is plainer, and has 15 bays with round-arched windows in the ground floor. In front of the buildings are cast iron railings.	II
Grand Arcade; 53.80036°N 1.54040°W		1897	The shopping arcade, which has been reduced in size, has a cast iron frame with brick walls, and details in terracotta, faience, and blue and yellow tiles. In the ground floor are modern shop fronts and entrances. The front on New Briggate has three gables with four storeys, between which are two two-storey entrances. The central gable has paired two-storey oriel windows, above which is a pair of niches with pediments and the date in the apex. Each outer gable has a single-storey oriel window, a four-light window above, and twin niches and a shaped gable. Between the gables, each bay has a large round-arched window with decorated spandrels, above which is a tiled frieze with the name of the arcade, an eight-light window, and overhanging eaves on curved brackets. On the corner is a turret. The Vicar Street front is similar with some differences in details.	II
Hotel Metropole; 53.79673°N 1.55018°W		1897–99	The hotel is in pink-red brick and terracotta, with a slate roof and a stone cupola. It is in five and six storeys and attics, with a front of nine bays, the left two bay projecting slightly under a Dutch gable, and seven bays in the left return. The entrance is semicircular and has Ionic columns with moulded shafts, and an entablature with a moulded frieze, and above is a semicircular three-storey bay window with rusticated Tuscan pilasters. Four of the bays contain two-storey oriel windows with ornate soffits on tall ornamented brackets. The cupola has a lead pointed dome with circular openings on the sides. In the left return is a round-arched doorway with a rusticated surround, a keystone, an impost band, and an entablature with a cornice, over which is a pedimented plaque with the Leeds coat of arms flanked by scrolls.	II
Greek Street Chambers; 53.79827°N 1.54725°W		1898	A bank on an island site, later used for other purposes, it was designed by Alfred Waterhouse. The ground floor is in polished grey granite, above it is in bands of red brick and yellow terracotta, and a roof is in lead and slate. There are three storeys and attics, five bays on the front on Park Row, the outer bays projecting, three on the left return in Russell Street, and five on the right return in Greek Street. The main entrance has Ionic columns and a segmental pediment, and above are mullioned and transomed windows with pilasters between. The windows in the top floor of the outer bays have columns and segmental pediments, and along the top are parapets and dormers. On the corners are square towers with pyramidal roofs. The left return contains a two-storey three-bay former porter's lodge, and the entrance on the right return has Ionic pillars, a round arch, an entablature and a cornice.	II
Statue of James Watt; 53.79658°N 1.54810°W		1898	The statue is in City Square in front of the former General Post Office, and is to the memory of the engineer and inventor James Watt. The sculptor was H. C. Fehr, and the statue is in bronze. It depicts the life-size figure of a man standing on a plinth of polished granite. On the plinth is an inscribed bronze plaque.	II
1-11, 11A and 13-35 Queen Victoria Street, 104-108 and 110-114 Briggate, 2–12, 14 and 16 Cross Arcade and 53-63 Vicar Lane; 53.79787°N 1.54106°W		1898–1902	Part of the County Arcade complex designed by Frank Matcham, it is in pink brick and terracotta, with a dentilled cornice, balustrades, and roofs of slate and lead. It forms an island block with three storeys and attic, and a front of seven bays. In the ground floor are shop windows, the middle floor contains three-light windows, and in the top floor are sash windows. At the top are Dutch gables, and corner towers with domed and octagonal roofs. Other features include moulded terracotta details, and ogee arches in architraves in the top floor.	II
2-12 Queen Victoria Street, 98–103 Briggate, 1–43 Cross Arcade and 65-69 Vicar Lane; 53.79849°N 1.54111°W	—	1898–1902	Part of the County Arcade complex designed by Frank Matcham, it is in pink brick and terracotta, and roofs of slate and lead. There are three storeys and attics, seven bays on Briggate, five bays on Vicar Lane, and four bays on each curved corner. At the entrances are elaborate wrought iron overthrows with lettering and a date. In the ground and middle floors are shop windows, and the top floor contains sash windows. At the top are Dutch gables, and ornamented corner towers.	II*
115-120 Briggate, 2-16 King Edward Street and 121–126 Briggate; 53.79768°N 1.54099°W	—	1898–1904	Part of the County Arcade complex designed by Frank Matcham, it is in pink brick and terracotta, with dentilled cornices, balustraded parapets, and roofs of slate and lead. The buildings form two blocks with fronts along King Edward Street and Briggate, and have three storeys and attics. In the ground and middle floors are shop windows, and the top floor contains sash windows. At the top are Dutch gables, and ornamented corner towers.	II
18–26 King Edward Street and 49–51 Vicar Lane; 53.79761°N 1.54075°W	—	1898–1904	Part of the County Arcade complex designed by Frank Matcham, it is in pink brick and terracotta, with dentilled cornices, balustraded parapets, and roofs of slate and lead. The buildings form two blocks with fronts along King Edward Street, and Vicar Lane, and have three storeys and attics. In the ground and middle floors are shop windows, and the top floor contains sash windows. At the top are Dutch gables, and ornamented corner towers.	II
East Parade Chambers, railings and gates 53.79876°N 1.54950°W		1899	Offices in yellow faience, with octagonal shafts, a modillion eaves cornice, a parapet with scrolled recesses and a moulded cornice, and a slate roof. There are three storeys, a basement and attics, and three bays. The middle bay is narrower and contains a projecting porch and recessed doorway, and at the top is a shaped gable, a date panel, and a small pediment. In the outer bays the ground floor contains plate glass windows, in the middle floor are canted bay windows, and in the top floor are arcaded windows with moulded arches and Ionic columns. In front of the basement areas are square moulded piers with pyramidal caps, elaborate railings and a gate.	II
The former Observatory; 53.79592°N 1.54671°W		1899	A bank on a corner site, later used for other purposes, it is in stone, and has a copper-covered dome with cresting. There is one storey, sides of three bays, and a curved bay on the corner. Between the bays are giant engaged fluted Corinthian columns carrying an entablature, surmounted by a parapet with statues and urns, The doorway in the corner bay has a pediment with acroteria, and the windows have moulded architraves with keystones, pulvinated friezes and pediments. Above the door and the windows are moulded rectangular panels containing the coats of arms of Yorkshire cities.	II
14–34 Central Road and 119, 120 and 121 Kirkgate; 53.79672°N 1.54107°W		c. 1900	A block of shops, workshops and offices in red brick, with a band, pilasters rising to a ramped parapet with a ball finial, and a tile roof. There are three storeys and attics, twelve bays on Central Road, three on Kirkgate, and one on the angled corner. Between the modern shop fronts in the ground floor are tile pilasters topped by brackets and obelisks. The upper floors contain segmental-arched windows with keystones, and in the attic are windows in shaped gables and pedimented dormers.	II
5 Duncan Street; 53.79618°N 1.54209°W		c. 1900	A brick shop with stone dressings and a slate roof. There are three storeys and an attic, and one bay. In the ground floor is a modern shop front, and above is a two-storey bay window with rusticated mullions, and a modillion cornice, The attic gable contains a Diocletian window with alternate brick and stone voussoirs.	II
6 Lands Lane; 53.79775°N 1.54348°W		c. 1900	A shop and storeroom on a corner site later used for other purposes, it has a steel frame and is faced in terracotta. There are four storeys and fronts of four bays. The lower two floors are glazed, and in the first floor windows are transoms with scrolled ogee decoration. In the upper two floors are rectangular windows with carved transoms and moulded corniced heads. At the top is a triglyph frieze, a moulded cornice, a parapet pierced with lettering and decoration, scrolled coping and ball finials.	II
26 Lands Lane; 53.79834°N 1.54335°W	—	c. 1900	A shop and office in brick with a slate roof, four storeys and one bay. In the ground floor is a shop front and a doorway to the right. The upper floors contain a full-height moulded brick arch, above which is a shallow moulded pediment flanked by octagonal turrets. The contents of the arch are fully glazed, with canted bay windows in the first and second floors, and a semicircular window above.	II
22–38 New York Street; 53.79642°N 1.53805°W		c. 1900	Shops, workshops and a warehouse on a corner site, in red brick with stone dressings and a slate roof. There are four storeys and attics, ten bays on New York Street, five bays on Harper Street, and one bay on the angled corner. In the ground floor are modern shop fronts, and the upper floors contain a mix of sash and casement windows, those in the second floor having round arches with keystones. In the attic are windows with shaped pediments and finials.	II
46 and 48 New York Street; 53.79638°N 1.53638°W		c. 1900	A shop and restaurant fronted by faience, with pilasters, an eaves band, a moulded cornice, a blocking course, and a central pediment with a finial. There are three storeys and three bays. The central doorway has a semicircular fanlight in a moulded arch with a keystone, and above it is a scrolled pediment. The doorway is flanked by plate glass windows, and in the upper floors are round-arched windows. The upper window in the middle floor has a balcony.	II
12 South Parade and railings 53.79896°N 1.54830°W		c. 1900	An office building in stone, the ground floor rusticated, with a grey slate roof. There are three storeys, an attic and a basement, and three bays. The doorway in the right bay has attached columns, a semicircular fanlight, and a segmental broken pediment. In the middle bay is a wide segmental-arched window with a carved keystone, and to the left is a narrow window. In the upper floors of the middle bay are bow windows with Ionic columns, and in the outer bays are sash windows with architraves and pediments. The attic has a balustraded parapet, and above the windows is a segmental pediment with the carving of a phoenix. Enclosing the basement area are wrought iron railings.	II
50–56 Vicar Lane, 1, 2 and 3 Harewood Street and 3–9 Ludgate Hill; 53.79787°N 1.53988°W		c. 1900	Shops and offices on a corner site, with a steel frame, and clad in terracotta with stone details. There are four storeys and attics, a front of four bays, six bays on Ludgate Hill, and six bays on Harewood Street. The ground floor has a pulvinated frieze and a modillion cornice, and contains shop doors and windows. In the first and second floors are large showroom windows rising through both floors, with segmental-headed lights, and between them are projecting hexagonal pilasters with moulded bosses, and capped by small domes. In the top floor, there is a corner turret with a lead dome and a finial, and paired round-headed dormer windows with stepped gables.	II
58 Vicar Lane; 53.79800°N 1.53987°W		1900	A shop and offices in brick with dressings in stone and terracotta, and a slate roof. On the front are pilasters, and at the top is a gable containing small windows, with moulded coping and pointed finials. There are four storeys and attics, and two bays. In the ground floor is a modern shop front, and the first floor contains two canted bay windows with triangular pediments. In the top two floors are three-light sash windows, and between the floors is a decorated and dated panel.	II
60 and 62 Vicar Lane; 53.79804°N 1.53981°W		1900	A shop and office, at one time a temperance hotel, it is in brick with dressings in stone and terracotta, and a slate roof. On the front are pilasters, and at the top is a gable containing small windows, with moulded coping and pointed finials. There are four storeys and attics, and two bays. In the ground floor is a modern shop front, and the first floor contains three-light mullioned and transomed windows. In the top two floors are three-light sash windows, and between the floors is a decorated and dated panel.	II
21 and 23 Wellington Street and 40 and 41 Aire Street; 53.79610°N 1.55079°W		1900	A factory and warehouse, later shops and offices, it has a steel frame clad in brick with stone dressings, and has a glazed roof. There are six storeys, and some of the bays on both fronts are fully glazed. The portico has Doric columns, and a doorway with a fanlight, a dated cartouche, a moulded arch with voussoirs, and an open segmental pediment. The other windows are casements, and at the top of the Wellington Street front is a parapet with an oeil-de-boeuf window and ball finials, and a shaped open pediment.	II
Abtech House; 53.79889°N 1.54686°W		1900	A bank, later used for other purposes, it is in stone with a slate roof, and has four storeys and a basement, and four bays. In the ground floor are two projecting entrances with two windows between, all flanked by pilasters with a geometrical pattern. Above is a frieze containing carving in deep relief, the central part depicting Minerva and trading scenes, over the entrances are cartouches, and above the frieze is egg and dart moulding. Between the windows in the first floor are cartouches, and above them is a dentilled string course. In the top two floors are fluting Corinthian pilasters, over which is a modillion cornice.	II
Cathedral Court; 53.80086°N 1.54620°W		1900	A Masonic Hall, later converted into offices, the ground floor is in red brick, above it is in yellow brick with stone dressings, and it has a modillion eaves cornice and a hipped slate roof. At the top in the centre is a pedimented gable, and on the roof is a bell turret. There are two storeys, a basement and attics, and a front of five bays with two bays on the sides. In the centre is a doorway with a moulded segmental arch flanked by round-arched windows with keystones, and a moulded string course above. The upper floor has round-arched recesses containing windows with pediments, the middle window with a carved coat of arms in the tympanum, and a bowed balcony with a balustrade.	II
Electric Press Building; 53.80120°N 1.54760°W		c. 1900	A printing works on a corner site, later used for other purposes, it is in red brick with stone dressings, on a plinth, with sill bands, a dentilled cornice with acroteria, and a slate roof. There are three storeys, attics and a basement, nine bays in Cookridge Street, three on Great George Street, and a curved bay on the corner. The entrance on the corner has a segmental head, Tuscan columns, a carved keystone, carved spandrels, a dentilled cornice, and a balustrade. The ground floor windows have segmental heads, moulded architraves, and keystones, in the upper floors the windows have round arches, and there are pedimented dormers. At the northwest corner is a tall chimney stack.	II
Former Guildford Public House; 53.79947°N 1.54605°W		c. 1900	The public house is in red brick, and has deep bracketed eaves with a central panel, and a slate roof. There are three storeys and seven bays. In the ground floor is an arcade of round arched windows, and an entrance in the left corner. On the corners of the upper floors are carved pilasters carried on statues of male figures, and in the upper floors are rectangular six-pane windows with imposts.	II
Leonardo Building; 53.80103°N 1.54707°W		c. 1900	Offices in red brick with stone dressings, pilasters, moulded sills and cornices, and a balustraded parapet. There are four storeys, a basement and attics, four bays on Great George Street, two on Cookridge Street and an angled bay on the corner. In the corner bay is a round-arched doorway that has fluted pilasters, impost blocks, a fanlight, and a triangular pediment on consoles. Above is a bay window with a wrought iron balcony, and a French window, and at the top is a three-stage tower. The adjacent bays on each side have pierced gables with triangular pediments, and contain stepped three-light windows. The windows in the first floor have segmental heads, and the other have flat heads.	II
Oxford Chambers; 53.80017°N 1.55069°W		c. 1900	An office building in red brick with stone bands and a slate roof. There are three storeys and an attic, and five bays. The left bay is a curved wall linking to a chapel, and the next bay is a tower with a round-arched doorway, above which are windows with ornate surrounds, and a parapet with ball finials and a cupola. The other bays have rectangular windows with keystones in the ground floor, the upper floors contain giant Corinthian columns and a balustrade, and at the top is a dormer with a Diocletian window and a pedimented gable.	II
Thoresby Building, railings and gates 53.80117°N 1.54657°W		1900	A pupil teachers' college, later used for other purposes, it is in brick with stone dressings and a slate roof. There are four storeys, the main front has five unequal bays, and on the returns are three bays. The main front has Corinthian pilasters, and a deep cornice below the top floor. The outer bays have carved gables and contain five-light Diocletian windows in the top floor. The adjacent bays contain entrances, and rise to square turrets, the top stage being open, with Ionic pilasters, louvred ventilators, a modillion cornice, and ogee roofs. The grounds are enclosed by low brick walls containing square piers with segmental pedimented capstones and double gates, and wrought iron railings.	II
Wray's Buildings; 53.79818°N 1.53971°W		c. 1900	A block of shops and offices on a corner site in brick with terracotta dressings and a grey slate roof with shaped gables. There are three storeys and attics, two bays on Vicar Lane, and seven on Sidney Street. In the ground floor are shop fronts, and in the middle of the left return is a doorway and two windows with a moulded round arch containing a circular panel. On the front and in the centre of the return are two-storey bay windows. Most of the other windows are mullioned and transomed, and on the corner is a moulded plaque.	II
Former Yorkshire Bank, Kirkgate; 53.79646°N 1.53893°W		1900	The bank building is on a corner site, and it was later used for other purposes. The ground floor is in terracotta, the upper parts are in brick with stone dressings, and it has sill bands and an eaves blocking course. There are three storeys and an attic, four bays on each front, and a curved bay on the corner. The doorway is on the corner, above it is a moulded plaque, and the windows are cross windows. Above the corner is a drum tower with a lead dome and an ornate finial carried on short columns with pierced walling, and it is flanked by small domes.	II
12 and 13 Commercial Street and 1 and 3 Lands Lane; 53.79753°N 1.54388°W		1901	A shop and chambers on a corner site, in bands of red and white terracotta, with dentilled cornices over the first floor and at the eaves, a balustraded parapet, and a slate roof. There are three storeys and attics, two bays on Commercial Street and five on Lands Lane, and a round turret on the corner. In the ground floor are shop fronts that have pilasters with lions and shields, and an entrance to the chambers. In the upper floors are windows, some round-headed, some mullioned and transomed, scrolled plaques, and statues, and in the attics are dormers with moulded stepped ogee gables.	II
36, 37, and 38 Commercial Street; 53.79736°N 1.54367°W		1901	A shop and chambers on a corner site in terracotta with a balustraded parapet and scrolled finials, and roof of curved glass and slate. There are five bays on the front and one in the right return, and the ground floor contains a modern shop front. In the middle floor, the central three bays on the front and the bay on the side contain curved bay windows with lead roofs, and above the outer bay windows are decorative terracotta panels. In the top floor the windows have moulded surrounds.	II
Former Leeds workhouse casual ward 53.80971°N 1.52346°W		1901	The former casual ward of the workhouse is in red brick with buff sandstone dressings and slate roofs. It consists of a front range extending along the road, with three rear wings, and two work sheds to the east. On the left is the receiving officer's house, to the right is a single-story reception block, and a single-storey block for females further to the right. The reception block has two projecting doorways with blocked pilasters, and a cornice band with segmental lintels, above which is inscribed "MALES" and "FEMALES". Above is a parapet and a truncated gable with shaped kneelers containing "CASUAL WARDS" in brick relief.	II
Leeds College of Art and Design and attached railings, Vernon Street; 53.80195°N 1.54636°W		1901–03	The college has a steel frame, with bands of red brick and stone, pilaster strips, a modillion cornice, and hipped slate roofs. There are three storeys and a basement, four bays on the front, the right bay recessed, and four bays in the left return. Steps lead up to the entrance in the right bay that has a Gibbs surround and an open segmental pediment, and above it is a mosaic by Gerald Moira. The windows are large and steel-framed, and in front of the building is a low stone-coped wall with cast iron railings.	II
Leeds Cathedral; 53.80067°N 1.54681°W		1901–04	The Roman Catholic cathedral is in sandstone, with carving in limestone, and slate roofs. It consists of a nave and a chancel, both with north and south aisles, north and south transepts, an octagonal sacristy south of the chancel, and a two-stage north tower with a pyramidal roof. The central part of the west end is gabled and flanked by chamfered buttresses rising to turrets with truncated finials. In the centre is a doorway with a pointed arch containing symbols of the Passion, and flanked by canopied niches. Above the doorway is a large Calvary, behind which are three recessed windows. The cathedral has a basement, and there is a presbytery and offices to the northeast. The presbytery is in red and cream brick with a slate roof, three storeys and seven bays.	II*
6 and 8 York Place and railings 53.79690°N 1.55168°W		1902	A pair of offices in red brick with terracotta detailing, pilasters, and a bracketed eaves cornice with central panels. There are three storeys, attics and basements, and each office has three bays, the middle bays narrower. Steps lead up to the central segmental-arched doorways that each has a moulded architrave, with three small lights and a plaque above. The windows have architraves, with one light in the middle bays and three lights in the outer bays. The basement areas are enclosed by cast iron railings with Art Nouveau scrolled panels.	II
Coronation Buildings; 53.79835°N 1.53956°W		1902	Shops, storerooms and offices clad in terracotta on a corner site, with hexagonal pilasters between the bays, and four storeys. There are four bays on the front on Vicar Lane, six bays on Sidney Street, and four on Harewood Street. Above the middle bay on the front is a moulded segmental plaque with the date and name of the building. In the ground floor are modern shops fronts. In the first floor are paired round-headed windows with moulded surrounds and voussoirs, the second floor contains paired rectangular windows, a moulded entablature and segmental pediments, and in the third floor are triple windows, an entablature and a cornice.	II
Statue of Dean Hook; 53.79669°N 1.54788°W		1902	The statue is in City Square in front of the former General Post Office, and is to the memory of Revd. Walter Farquhar Hook, Vicar of Leeds from 1837 to 1859. The sculptor was F. W. Pomeroy, and the statue is in bronze. It depicts the life-size figure of a man dressed in a robe with his right arm raised, standing on a plinth of polished granite. On the plinth is an inscribed bronze plaque.	II
Apsley House; 53.79682°N 1.55404°W		1903	A warehouse, later offices, in red brick and pink terracotta, with a plain parapet, shaped in the outer bays. There are four storeys and a basement, a front of nine bays, and five bays on the left return. The central entrance projects and has a segmental pediment containing moulded plaques in the tympanum. The basement windows have flat heads, and those in the ground floor have moulded elliptical arches with a sill band, and above is a cornice. The upper floors contain canted bay windows with moulded surrounds and keystones, and between the floors are ornate relief friezes.	II
Four statues named "Even"; 53.79658°N 1.54748°W		1903	The four statues are by Alfred Drury and stand in City Square. They are in bronze and depict a life-size female figure with the left arm raised and holding a torch. Each statue stands on a polished granite plinth, on an inscribed base.	II
Four statues named "Morn"; 53.79637°N 1.54806°W		1903	The four statues are by Alfred Drury and stand in City Square. They are in bronze and depict a life-size female figure with the right arm raised and holding a torch. Each statue stands on a polished granite plinth, on an inscribed base.	II
Statue of John Harrison; 53.79660°N 1.54807°W		1903	The statue is in City Square in front of the former General Post Office, and is to the memory of the merchant and benefactor John Harrison. The sculptor was H. C. Fehr, and the statue is in bronze. It depicts the life-size figure of a man standing on a plinth of polished granite. On the plinth is an inscribed bronze plaque.	II
Statue of Joseph Priestley; 53.79663°N 1.54796°W		1903	The statue is in City Square in front of the former General Post Office, and is to the memory of the scientist Joseph Priestley. The sculptor was F. W. Pomeroy, and the statue is in bronze. It depicts the life-size figure of a man standing on a plinth of polished granite. On the plinth is an inscribed bronze plaque.	II
Statue of The Black Prince; 53.79640°N 1.54758°W		1903	The statue is at the apex of City Square and depicts Edward the Black Prince. The sculptor was Thomas Brock, and the statue is in bronze. It consists of the over life-size figure of a man in armour seated on a horse, on a two-step plinth of polished granite. On each side is a bronze plaque, those on the front and rear with inscriptions, and on the sides depicting battles. Around the plinth is a bronze band with the names of prominent contemporaries of the Black Prince.	II*
19, 21 and 23 Albion Place and gas light 53.79773°N 1.54285°W		1904	A row of five shops and offices in brick and terracotta with a slate roof. There are three storeys and attics, and five bays. In the ground floor are modern shop fronts, and between the bays in the upper floor are pilasters with moulded bases and capitals. In the middle floor are large three-light showroom windows with segmental arches, moulded voussoirs, and keystones. The top floor contains sash windows with moulded and scrolled cornices, and at the top is a balustraded parapet broken by two dormers with elaborate gables toward the centre, and on the right is a gable with a Diocletian window. At the rear is a gas light on a bracket.	II
7 Duncan Street; 53.79615°N 1.54193°W		c. 1904	Shops and offices in terracotta, with a deep eaves cornice, a parapet with scrolls and plaques, and a slate roof. It is in Baroque style, and has three storeys and an attic, and seven bays. In the ground floor are modern shop fronts, and the windows above are mullioned and transomed. In three bays are canted bay windows, and at the top of the middle bay is a recessed window with an entablature on columns in front, and behind is a pedimented gable with an obelisk finial. The outer bays are surmounted by square turrets, each with attached columns, a cornice, a parapet with swags, console brackets, and globes.	II
9 and 11 Duncan Street; 53.79613°N 1.54167°W		1904	A shop and offices on a corner site, in faience with a slate roof, and in Baroque style. There are four storeys, two wide bays on the front, a rounded corner bay with a turret, and narrower bays in the left return. In the ground floor are modern shop fronts, and the first and second floor contain canted bay windows with pilasters, flanked by narrow windows in rusticated architraves. Above are large semicircular windows with rusticated arches and balconies, and at the top are gables with small pediments. The corner bay contains two oval windows in architraves with swags, pilasters, consoles, a cornice, and a dome.	II
Centenary House; 53.80169°N 1.53915°W		1904	A public dispensary on a corner site, later used for other purposes, the ground floor is in rusticated stone, above it is in red brick with stone dressings, a balustraded parapet and a slate roof. There are five storeys at the front, diminishing to the rear up the hill to two storeys. The entrance front has three bays, a large bowed bay on the right, a curved bay on the left, and at the rear are six bays. The central doorway has Ionic columns and a semicircular fanlight, above which is an oriel window supported by putti, and at the top of the bay is a three-light dormer with a segmental pediment flanked by pilasters with carved plaques. The windows are sashes, in the ground floor with architraves and keystones, and in the second floor with Gibbs surrounds. In the left return, the last bay contains a doorway with rusticated pilasters, a carved plaque, and a scrolled pediment with a statue of a figure with a book.	II
City Markets; 53.79726°N 1.53954°W		1904	The market building has a frame of cast iron and steel, and the exterior is in stone with slate roofs and lead-clad domes. There are four storeys and attics, and fronts on George Street and Kirkgate of eleven bays. The main entrance is on the corner, in the ground floor are shop fronts, and in the upper floors are windows of various types. Other features include elaborate gables, dormers, two mansard roofs with balustrades and finials, a central tiered steeple, a tower with a domed cupola, and a larger domed temple with a cupola.	I
Former Jubilee Hotel; 53.79951°N 1.54966°W		1904	A block on a corner site containing a public house and offices, it is in red brick and terracotta, with a slate roof. There are four storeys and an attic, a front of four bays and two bays on the right return. On the corner is a tower that has oval windows with swags in the third floor and a dome. In the ground floor are three doorways with scrolled pediments, and flat-headed windows. On the front the first floor contains four large round-arched windows, and the other windows are sashes with flat heads. Above the middle two bays on the front is a gable containing three-light windows, flanked by a bowed balustraded parapet, and there is a similar smaller gable on the right return.	II
Yorkshire Bank, Duncan Street; 53.79621°N 1.54223°W		c. 1904	The bank on a corner site is in terracotta with a modillion eaves cornice, a scrolled parapet, ornate gables containing round windows, and a slate roof. There are four storeys and attics, four bays on Briggate, three on Duncan Street, and a bay on the corner. Between the bays are rusticated pilasters, and on the ground floor are windows and the corner entrance. The first and second floors contain canted bay windows, and in the top floor are recessed sash windows with attached columns. On the corner is an octagonal turret with ball finials and a dome. The decorations include swags, scrolls and female figures.	II
Goodbard House; 53.79767°N 1.54947°W		1905	Originally a hotel, later a restaurant and offices, it is on a corner site, the ground floor is in Peterhead granite, with sandstone above, moulded string courses, a modillion eaves cornice, a balustraded parapet, and a slate roof. There are four storeys and an attic, with two further storeys in the roof, and five bays on King Street, three on Infirmary Street, and three more on the curved corner. In the ground floor are segmental-arched windows and round-arched doorways, and above the King Street entrance is a two-storey oriel window. In the upper floors are rusticated pilaster strips, and windows with round or flat heads. On the top are pedimented dormers, and over the centre is a domed octagonal turret with coupled attached columns supported by two carved figures.	II
133, 135 and 137 Briggate; 53.79694°N 1.54218°W		1907	A Post Office exchange, later shops, it is in red brick and pink terracotta, and the top floor is tiled. There are five storeys and three bays, and the ground floor contains modern shop fronts. Above, in the central bay, is a round-headed window, over which are canted bay windows. In the flanking bays, the first and second floors contain three round-arched windows with columns and decorated spandrels. The fourth floor contains five-arched arcades with an entablature and a modillion cornice. In the top floor each outer bay has three rectangular windows, ball finials on the corners, and a central gablet with a plaque.	II
50, 52 and 54 Albion Street and 35 and 35A Albion Place; 53.79779°N 1.54498°W		1908	Originally a YMCA building, later a block of shops and offices on a corner site, it is in stone, the lower two floors rusticated, with a modillion eaves cornice and a slate roof, and is in Baroque style. There are four storeys, five bays on Albion Place, and four on Albion Street. The main entrance has paired columns, and a broken segmental pediment surmounted by swagged urns, above which is a Venetian stair window, and a Diocletian window. In the ground floor are shop windows with a balustrade above, and in the upper floors are canted bay windows, and sash windows, some mullioned and transomed, with various decorative features.	II
Vicarage Chambers and railings 53.79878°N 1.55082°W		1908	An office building in red brick and terracotta with a slate roof. There are two storeys and an attic, and five bays. Steps flanked by curved walls lead up to the central arched doorway that has a decorated surround, pilasters rising to finials, and a keystone, and the ground floor windows are tripartite with segmental heads. The rest of the ground floor has terracotta tiles decorated with circles and flowers, and above it is a dentilled cornice. The upper floor windows have architraves with egg and dart moulding, aprons, and cornices on console brackets, and in the attic are three two-light dormers. In front of the building are wrought iron railings.	II
Royal Bank of Scotland; 53.79890°N 1.54725°W		1909	The bank, which is on a corner site, has a frame of reinforced concrete, it is clad in white faience, and has a slate roof. It has three storeys in parts, and four storeys and an attic elsewhere. There are four bays on the front on Park Row, five bays on each return, and a curved bay on each corner, and above the right corner is a turret with a dome and finial. The ground floor is rusticated and contains openings with segmental-arched heads, and above, the windows have flat heads. The windows in the first and second floor have cast iron balconies, with caryatids and decorative plaques below those in the second floor. At the level of the second floor are sculptures of allegorical figures and an entablature with gold lettering, and at the top is a parapet and dormers.	II
Atlas House; 53.79778°N 1.54992°W		1910	An office block on a corner site, with a concrete core, faced in faience, with a rusticated ground floor, a cornice over the ground floor, and a modillion cornice over the second floor. There are four storeys and attics, four bays on each front and three on the curved corner. In the ground floor are segmental-arched doorways, and round-arched windows, all having keystones with masks representing the races of the world. Above the first floor windows are elaborate segmental pediments on consoles and above the dormer windows are triangular or segmental pediments. Over the entrance on the corner is an ornate sculpture of Atlas.	II
13 and 14 Albion Place and 64 Briggate; 53.79793°N 1.54264°W		Early 20th century	Shops and offices in stone and in brown and green terracotta, with a bracketed eaves cornice and a slate roof. There are four storeys and attics, eight bays on Albion Place, one on Briggate, and an angled bay on the corner. In the ground floor are modern shop fronts, and the first floor contains plate glass windows and two canted bay windows. The upper floors contain sash windows, and in the centre of the top floor is a Diocletian window with a balustrade. Over the building are dormers with elaborate gables, a ramped parapet, and obelisk finials.	II
17 and 18 Albion Place and 60 Briggate; 53.79773°N 1.54251°W		Early 20th century	Shops and offices on a corner site in brick and terracotta with a slate roof. There are three storeys and attics, five bays on Albion Place, one on Briggate, and one on the angled corner. In the ground floor is a modern shop front, and at the right is an entrance with a segmental hood. The upper floors contain cross windows and single lights, in the middle floor flanked by banded pilasters. In the attic are moulded entablatures and dormers with segmental pediments, between which is a pierced and moulded parapet, all surmounted by urns.	II
26 Albion Place; 53.79775°N 1.54334°W	—	Early 20th century	A shop in terracotta, with a moulded sill band and a bracketed eaves cornice. There are three storeys and one bay. In the ground floor are modern shop windows, and the upper floors are flanked by pilasters with moulded bases surmounted by small domes with knobbed finials. The middle floor contains a two-light segmental-arched showroom window with moulded voussoirs, and in the top floor are four sash windows. At the top is an ornate panel with flower motifs.	II
8 and 9 Commercial Street and 2 and 4 Lands Lane; 53.79753°N 1.54351°W		Early 20th century	A shop on a corner site in terracotta, with segmental pilasters between the windows rising to a modillion eaves cornice, a balustraded parapet and cone-shaped pinnacles, and a slate roof. There are three storeys and attics, one bay on Commercial Street, three on Lands Lane, and three angled bays on the corner. In the ground floor are modern shop fronts, in the first floor the middle bay on the corner contains a canted bay window, and the other windows have segmental arches with voussoirs. In the top floor the windows are mullioned and transomed, the panels between them with shields, and at the top are pedimented dormers, the larger one on Lands Lane with paired sash windows and pinnacles.	II
76–88 Vicar Lane, 2–8 Eastgate and 11 and 13 Harewood Street; 53.79871°N 1.53941°W		Early 20th century	A block of shops, workshops and a hotel, it is in brick and banded terracotta with a slate roof, and has two parts. The main part has three storeys and attics, six bays on Vicar Lane, two on Eastgate, and a canted bay on the corner. In the ground floor are modern shop fronts, and the middle floor contains large segmental-headed windows with voussoirs. The top floor has sash windows with moulded lintels, a cornice and a parapet, and in the attic are paired windows in pedimented gables and dormers, and on the corner is a turret with a lead dome. The other part has three storeys, with three bays on Eastgate, and three bays on Harewood Street under a coped gable containing terracotta plaques.	II
Pearl Buildings and Chambers; 53.79944°N 1.54891°W		1911	An office building on a corner site, the ground floor is in polished granite, the upper parts are in Portland stone, and the roof is slated. There are four storeys and attics, five bays on the front, and three on both returns. In the centre of each front is a doorway that has an elliptical arch with a keystone, a fanlight, and a pediment on consoles. The ground floor windows have round arches, squat Ionic half-columns, voussoirs, and keystones, and the windows in the upper floors have flat heads. Other features include bay windows with balustered balconies, at the top is a modillion cornice, a pierced parapet, corbelled octagonal pinnacles on the corners, shaped and panelled gables, and a dome.	II
Crispin House; 53.80112°N 1.53816°W		1914–16	A clothing factory on a corner site, extended in 1926, and since used for other purposes, it is in red brick with dressings in white faience, a dentilled cornice, a blocking course, a parapet and a geometric metal balustrade. There are four storeys and a basement, and a front of 17 bays, three bays on North Street and a curved bay on the corner, and the extension to the east has five storeys and six bays. The main entrance is near the corner and contains doors and windows divided by Ionic pilasters, and at the top is a metal-clad dome with a dentilled cornice and a bud finial. The two entrances on the front have circular fanlights, and the string course is carried over the doorway as segmental hoods. The windows in the second floor have segmental heads, and three keystones, the other windows are rectangular, those in the first floor with one keystone.	II
50 and 51 Briggate; 53.79715°N 1.54253°W		c. 1918	A pair of shops with a reinforced concrete and steel frame, faced in faience, with two storeys and two wide bays. In the ground floor are modern shop fronts. The upper floor contains two tiers of windows, three to each shop, between fluted columns with rosette and egg and dart motifs on the capitals, an entablature with triglyphs, a modillion cornice, and a pierced blocking course containing plaques with lettering flanked by lions' heads.	II
Former Majestic Cinema; 53.79643°N 1.54887°W		1921	A cinema on a corner site that has been converted for other uses, it is in faience with a slate roof. There are two storeys, basement and attics, twelve bays on the curved corner and eight further bays on each side at the rear. The front is banded to imitate rustication. The three bays over the central entrance contain round-headed windows with keystones, and are flanked by flat-headed windows, the latter with swags above. Over these is a curved balustrade and two statues, and flanking this are parapets containing three circular windows and surmounted by urns.	II
Leeds War Memorial; 53.79980°N 1.54768°W		1922	The war memorial was moved from City Square to its present site in 1937. It consists of a squat obelisk in Carrara marble, on a plinth, on octagonal steps. The obelisk has carvings including owls, wreaths and flags. Standing on the south side of the plinth is a statue of Saint George and the Dragon and on the north side is a statue of Peace releasing a dove, both in bronze by H. C. Fehr. On the top is a bronze statue of winged Victory added in 1992 to replace one by Fehr that had been damaged.	II
Former Barclays Bank; 53.79861°N 1.54728°W		c. 1925	The bank on an island site, later used for other purposes, is in stone, the ground floor is rusticated, and it has vermiculated rusticated quoins, a sill band, a moulded string course, an eaves cornice, and a slate roof. There are four storeys and an attic, five bays on the front, canted bays on the corners, and three bays on the sides. The entrances in the corners each has fluted columns, an entablature, and above is a plaque. The ground floor windows have scrolled keystones, the upper floor windows have moulded architraves, some with cast iron grilles, and in the attic are dormers.	II
Permanent House and Headrow Buildings; 53.79976°N 1.54582°W	—	1929–31	A block of shops and offices designed by Reginald Blomfield, and extended in 1955. It is in red brick and Portland stone with four storeys. There are 27 bays on The Headrow, nine bays on the left return, eleven bays on the right return in Cookridge Street, and four bays on Albion Street. The ground floor is in rusticated stone, and it contains shop fronts and entrances with round-arched heads. The windows in the upper floors have flat heads, those in the first floor with architraves and keystones. At the top is a panelled and balustraded parapet with urns. To the left is a round-arched carriage entrance, above which are columns and an entablature. Some of the windows in the second floor have segmental pediments, and aprons with swags.	II
2–12 The Headrow; 53.79916°N 1.54033°W		1930–32	A block consisting of a bank and shops designed by Reginald Blomfield, it has a steel frame faced in red brick with dressings in Portland stone, with a cornice above the ground floor, and slate roofs. There are four storeys, 14 bays on The Headrow, three on Vicar Lane, and a bay on the angled corner. The bank on the corner is in stone, with a rusticated ground floor. Its doorway is in the corner, and above it is a cornice on consoles and a carved badge. In the rest of the block there are shop fronts in the ground floor, the upper floors contain giant Doric pilasters, and flat-headed windows with varying surrounds, and at the top is a balustrade and urns.	II
Former Odeon Cinema; 53.79929°N 1.54109°W		1930–32	The former cinema and shops were designed by Reginald Blomfield. The building has a steel frame faced in red brick, dressings in Portland stone, a balustrade with urns, and a slate roof. There are four storeys, a front of 17 bays, a bay on the canted corner, and one bay to the left. The ground floor is rusticated and contains shop fronts. The corner and flanking bays, and some bays along the side, have giant Doric pilasters, and windows with moulded surrounds. The other windows have flat heads, and those in the first floor have stepped keystones.	II
Civic Hall; 53.80196°N 1.54858°W		1931–33	The civic hall is in Portland stone with a roof of green Cumbrian slate. It has a V-shaped plan on a triangular site, with the front on the truncated south side. The front has two storeys and an attic, and seven bays. In the centre is a portico with four Corinthian columns, and a pediment containing a coat of arms. The windows are sashes, those in the ground floor with Gibbs surrounds and alternate segmental and triangular pediments, and at the top is a balustraded parapet. There are flanking small pavilions, and behind are tall slender towers with Corinthian columns and round-headed openings in the first stage. Above is a pedimented bell stage and at the top are obelisk spires with gilded owl finials. Bracketed out from the sides of the hall are gilded clocks.	II*
Algernon Firth Institute of Pathology; 53.80196°N 1.55363°W		1932	The research building has a core of reinforced concrete, walls of grey-brown brick, and a flat roof. There are three storeys, the central part projects, and it is flanked by seven bays on each side, and a recessed bay at each end. In the central part is a doorway with a surround of Portland stone, the windows are in dentilled recesses, and between them are panels of herringbone brickwork.	II
Leeds and Holbeck Building Society; 53.79913°N 1.53944°W		1932	A bank designed by Reginald Blomfield, it is red brick and Portland stone with a slate roof. There are four storeys, three bays on Vicar Lane, one on Eastgate, corner bays, and a corner entrance bay. The ground floor is rusticated, above are string courses, giant pilasters, and a parapet, partly balustraded, there is some decoration with swags, and urns. The entrance has an architrave, above it is a cartouche, and the windows in the adjoining bays are tall and round-headed with voussoirs and keystones. The other windows are sashes, some with segmental pediments above and swags beneath.	II
Petrol station 53.79862°N 1.53590°W		1932	The petrol station in the middle of a roundabout, later converted into a fountain, was designed by Reginald Blomfield. It is in brick with stone dressings, an eaves band and a parapet, and a roof of copper and slate. There is a hexagonal plan, and a round-arched opening on each side with impost bands and keystones. The lower part of the roof has a tent shape, and above it is pointed, with a ball finial and a glass torch.	II
Railings enclosing Petrol station 53.79855°N 1.53613°W	—	1932	The railings, which were designed by Reginald Blomfield, are probably in cast iron, they are on a stone plinth, and have a circular plan with three openings. The railings are about 0.75 metres (2 ft 6 in) high, and have a geometric design with "X" and "O" motifs.	II
Two telephone kiosks, Centenary Street; 53.79993°N 1.54768°W		1935	The telephone kiosks are of the K6 type, designed by Giles Gilbert Scott. Constructed in cast iron with a square plan and a dome, they have unperforated crowns in the top panels.	II
Six telephone kiosks, City Square; 53.79660°N 1.54810°W		1935	The telephone kiosks stand individually along the front of the former General Post Office. They are of the K6 type, designed by Giles Gilbert Scott. Constructed in cast iron with a square plan and a dome, they have unperforated crowns in the top panels.	II
Two telephone kiosks outside Oxford Place Church; 53.80004°N 1.55062°W		1935	The telephone kiosks outside the church are of the K6 type, designed by Giles Gilbert Scott. Constructed in cast iron with a square plan and a dome, they have unperforated crowns in the top panels.	II
Telephone kiosk, Thoresby Place; 53.80136°N 1.55252°W	—	1935	The telephone kiosk near Leeds General Infirmary is of the K6 type, designed by Giles Gilbert Scott. Constructed in cast iron with a square plan and a dome, it has unperforated crowns in the top panels.	II
Railway Company's Offices; 53.79603°N 1.54833°W		c. 1935	The office building, partly used later for other purposes, has a steel frame, with Portland stone on the front, and brown brick on the sides and rear. There are seven storeys, ten paired windows on the City Square front, an angled front on Aire Street with eight windows and a four-window projecting block. The City Square front contains the entrance to the station concourse, which has a moulded flat arch, and drum columns. On the fifth floor is a plaque with a coat of arms, and the windows are casements with metal frames. On Aire Street are two doorways that have architraves with keystones and crests above.	II
Forecourt walls, Town Hall; 53.79975°N 1.55007°W	—	1936	The walls in front of the forecourt of the town hall are in stone, and extend for about 40 metres (130 ft) on Oxford Place, and along The Heathrow, including the gap for steps, for about 70 metres (230 ft). The lower courses are rusticated, the walls are heavily moulded above, and the terminals are cylindrical.	II
Queens Hotel; 53.79596°N 1.54759°W		1937	The hotel has a steel frame, with Portland stone on the front, and brown brick on the sides and rear. There are eight storeys, two mezzanines and an attic, and 17 bays, the outer three bays projecting. In the centre of the ground floor is a wide porte cochère on drum columns, and at the ends are single-bay pavilions with pediments. The windows are casements with metal frames. There are further pavilions with pediments flanking the attic floor, and in the centre of the roof.	II
Barclays Bank and Chambers; 53.79880°N 1.54008°W		1938	The bank was designed by Reginald Blomfield, in Portland stone and red brick, the ground floor rusticated, with a cornice over the ground floor, an eaves cornice; and a balustraded parapet with urns. There are four storeys, four bays on The Headrow, three on Vicars Lane, and a bay on the angled corner. The entrance in the corner has a cornice on consoles and a keystone, and over it is a crest. Above, in the second floor, the window has a segmental pediment and below it are swags, and at the top is a carved wreath. On the ground floor are round-arched windows, and to the right on The Headrow is the entrance to the chambers. In the upper floors is an entablature and giant Doric pilasters. The other windows are rectangular with small panes, those in the first floor with stepped keystones.	II
Former Office of the West Yorkshire Archives Service; 53.80852°N 1.53443°W		1938	Originally a library, the former records office is in red-brown brick on a plinth of Portland stone, with pilasters, a parapet, and a hipped grey slate roof. There are two storeys with a small single-storey extension to the north, and a rectangular plan with a broad canted corner. On the front facing Chapeltown Road are six bays, and there are five facing Roscoe Street. The doorway in the corner has a stone surround, and the windows have steel frames.	II
Bank House; 53.79726°N 1.55053°W		1969–71	A bank building in reinforced concrete clad in polished grey Cornish granite. There are five storeys and a basement, and the building is in the form of an inverted ziggurat, with a central light well. Attached to the north and east fronts is an elevated first floor pedestrian walkway. The windows are rectangular with bronze frames.	II

== See also ==
- Listed buildings in Leeds (City and Hunslet Ward - southern area)
