= Quebecs Hotel, Leeds =

Hotel in Leeds, West Yorkshire, England

Quebecs
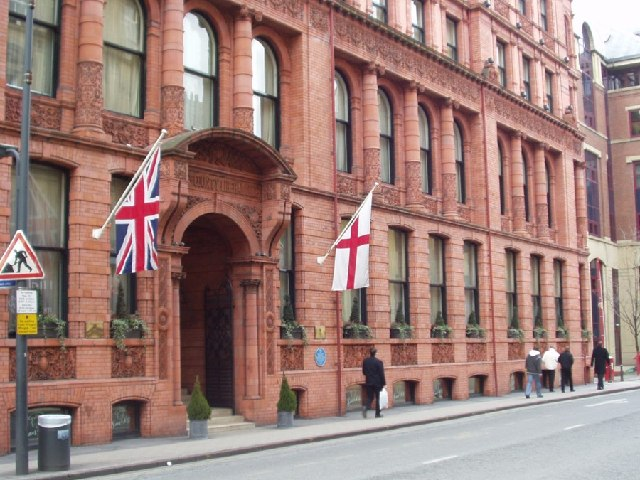
- Interactive map of the Quebecs area

General information
- Location: 9 Quebec Street, Leeds, England; LS1 2HA
- Coordinates: 53.796711°N 1.549205°W
- Opening: 2002
- Owner: OMC Investments Limited

Technical details
- Floor count: 5

Other information
- Number of rooms: 44
- Number of suites: 7
- Parking: 7 spaces

Website
- Official website

Quebecs is a Grade II listed 4-star hotel with 44 rooms located on Quebec Street in Leeds, West Yorkshire, England. Built in 1891, the building has two-storey-high stained glass windows which display the coats of arms of the principal towns of Yorkshire. Previously the building was used as the headquarters of the Leeds & County Liberal Club. The building underwent a £6 million renovation when it was acquired by The Eton Collection in 2000.

== Awards ==
The hotel has been awarded Tablet Hotels Selection Award 2009, Esquire Best UK Business Hotel 2007, one of The Independent's 50 best British hotels 2007 and One of the top hotels in the world by Condé Nast Traveler 2003.

== See also ==
- Listed buildings in Leeds (City and Hunslet Ward - northern area)
