= Yorkshire Coastliner =

Bus operator in North Yorkshire, England

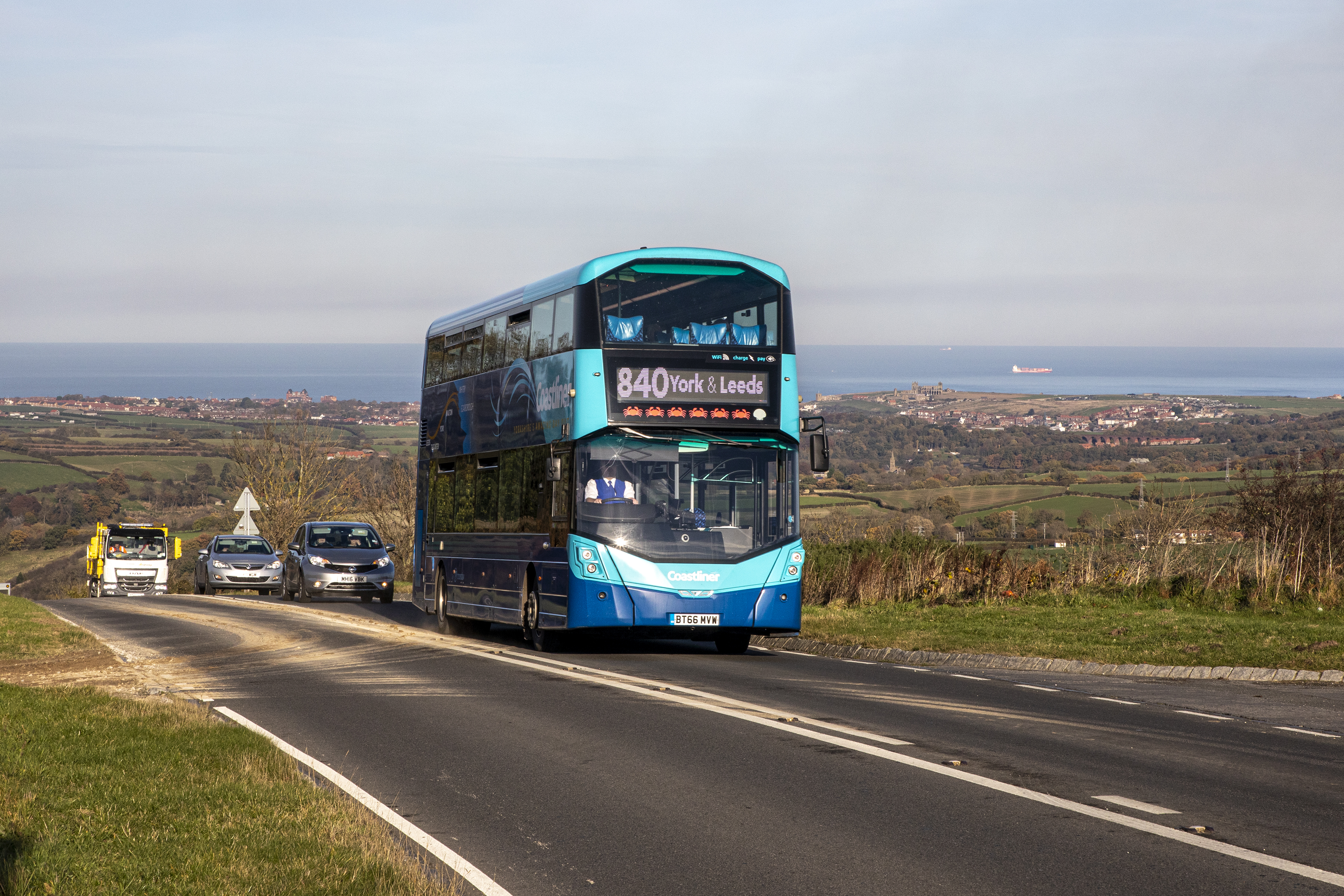
- A Coastliner branded Wright Gemini 3 bodied Volvo B5TL in the North York Moors, operating service 840 in November 2021
- Parent: Transdev Blazefield
- Founded: 1990; 36 years ago
- Headquarters: Harrogate, North Yorkshire; England
- Service area: North Yorkshire; West Yorkshire
- Service type: Bus and coach
- Stations: Malton Bus Station
- Depots: 3
- Fleet: 58 (at July 2023)
- Managing Director: Henri Rohard
- Website: transdevbus.co.uk/coastliner transdevbus.co.uk/flyer/ yorkcitysightseeing.com

Yorkshire Coastliner is a bus company that operates both local and regional bus services in North Yorkshire and West Yorkshire, England. It is a subsidiary of Transdev Blazefield.

== History ==
The company was established in 1990, when the York-based services of AJS Group were sold to Yorkshire Rider. At the time, AJS Group retained the regional services between Leeds and Bridlington, Filey, Scarborough and Whitby via York and Malton.

In August 1991, Yorkshire Coastliner was included in the purchase of AJS Group by Blazefield Group, following the sale of seven of the company's eight remaining bus firms at the time – a deal valued at £2.2 million.

In January 2006, French-based operator Transdev acquired the Blazefield Group, along with 305 vehicles.

In August 2008, Top Line Travel and Veolia Transport were purchased. The company further expanded in February 2012, following the purchase of York Pullman's local bus operations. The sale included the transfer of 31 employees and 17 vehicles.

In 2018, following the award of contracts by North Yorkshire County Council to replace those formerly operated by Stephensons of Easingwold, local services in and around York were rebranded York & Country, with vehicles subsequently rebranded in a two-tone blue livery.

In December 2024, rival operator Reliance announced that all four of their public service routes (30, 31X, 40 and 74), as well as two school routes, would be sold to and taken over by Transdev on 19 January 2025. Eleven buses were also included in the sale. The buses and routes subsequently began operation with Transdev under the York & Country brand.

== Branding ==
=== Coastliner ===
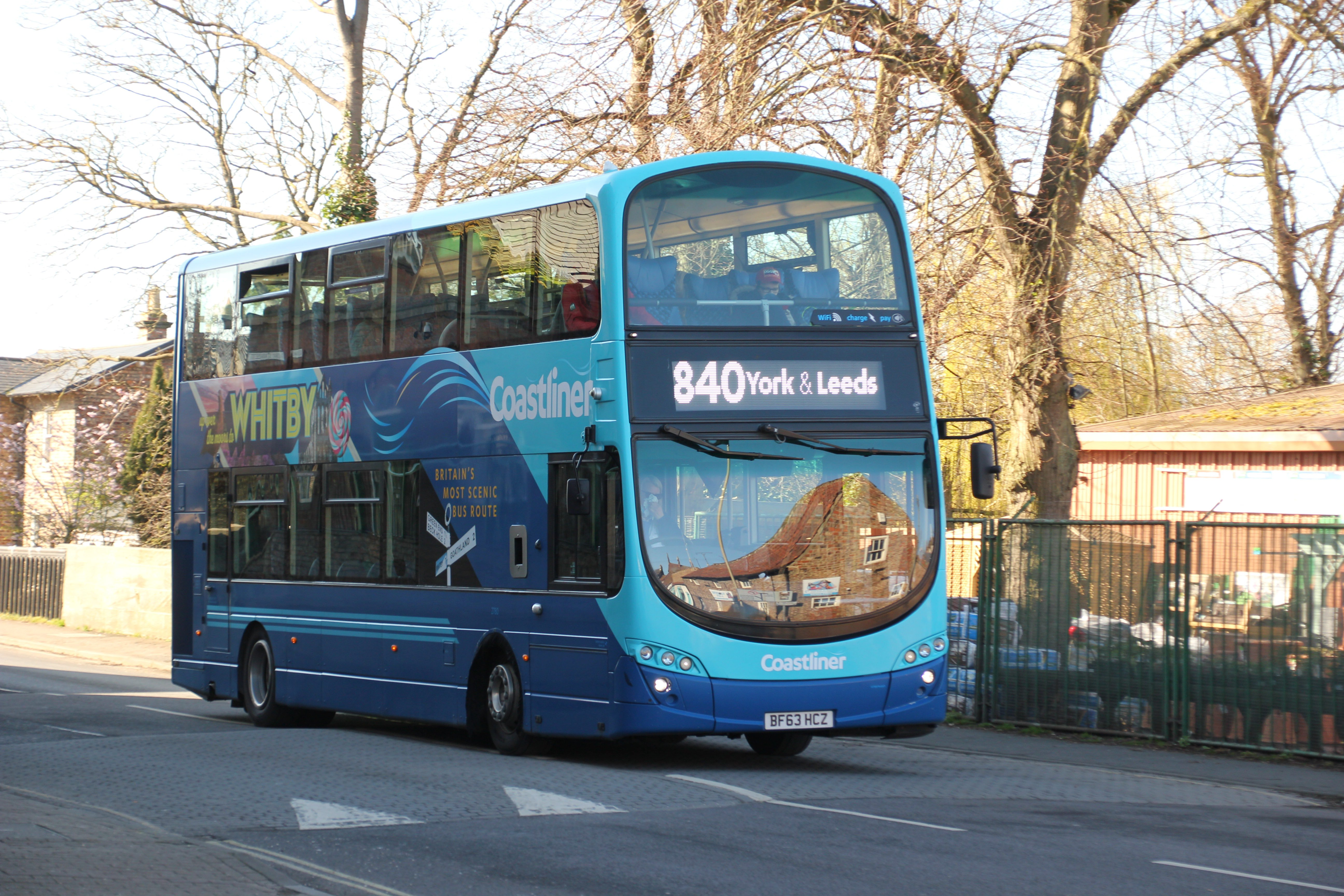
A Wright Eclipse Gemini 2 bodied Volvo B9TL in Malton, operating service 840 in March 2023

The Coastliner brand encompasses a group of regional services linking Leeds, Tadcaster and York with the towns and villages of Malton, Pickering and Thornton-le-Dale, and the coastal resorts of Scarborough and Whitby. Services are operated by a fleet of Wright Eclipse Gemini 2 bodied Volvo B9TL and Wright Gemini 3 bodied Volvo B5TL double-deck vehicles, branded in a two-tone blue livery. The vehicles include free WiFi, USB and wireless charging and audio-visual next stop announcements.

In May 2018, the 840 service, which runs between Leeds and Whitby, was voted as the "most scenic bus route in Britain" in an online poll.

=== Flyer ===
A Flyer Mercedes-Benz Citaro hybrid electric bus in Shipley operating service A3 in October 2026

In September 2020, in partnership with Leeds Bradford Airport, Transdev Blazefield and West Yorkshire Combined Authority, the company commenced operation of a network services centring around the airport. Operations were transferred from former operator, Yorkshire Tiger, including a depot at Idle, West Yorkshire. Services 737, 747 and 757 were subsequently rebranded Flyer and renumbered A1 (Horsforth & Leeds), A2 (Bradford & Harrogate) and A3 (Bradford, Guiseley, Otley & Shipley).

As of April 2022, services are operated by a fleet of Optare Versa single-deck vehicles, branded in a yellow and purple livery. The vehicles include free WiFi, USB charging ports, audio-visual next stop announcements and additional luggage storage. Some vehicles are also fitted with wireless chargers. These buses will be replaced by a fleet of 15 Mercedes-Benz Citaro hybrid electric single-deck vehicles, an order worth £4 million, which are expected to enter service by the end of 2024.

=== York & Country ===
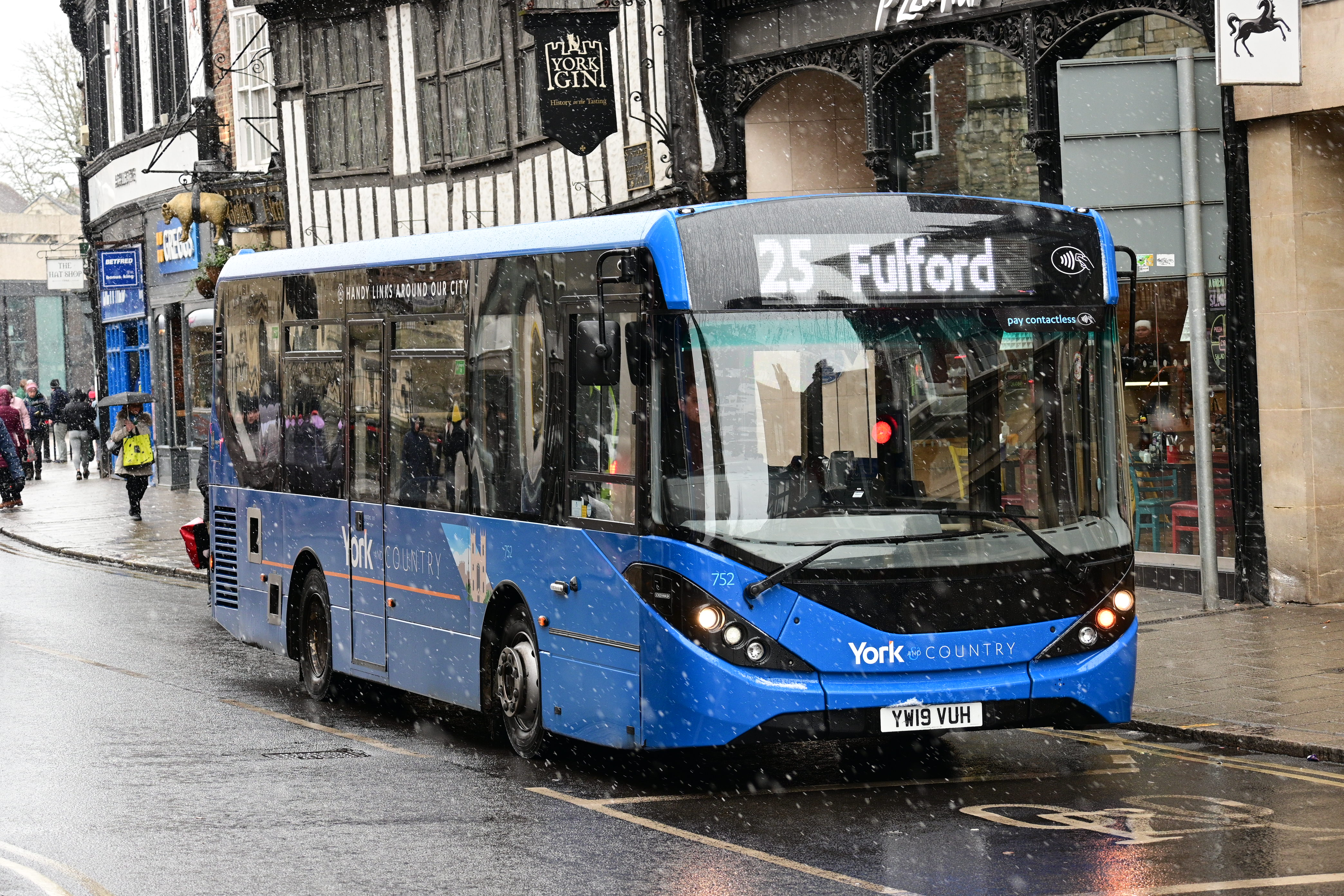
A York & Country Alexander Dennis Enviro200 MMC, operating service 25 in March 2023

The York & Country brand encompasses local services operating in and around the cathedral city of York, with destinations including Acomb, Derwenthorpe, Fulford, Haxby and Rawcliffe. Services are operated by a fleet of Alexander Dennis Enviro200 MMC as well as Volvo B7RLE Wright Eclipse 2 and Mellor Strata minibuses branded in a two-tone blue livery.

=== York City Sightseeing ===
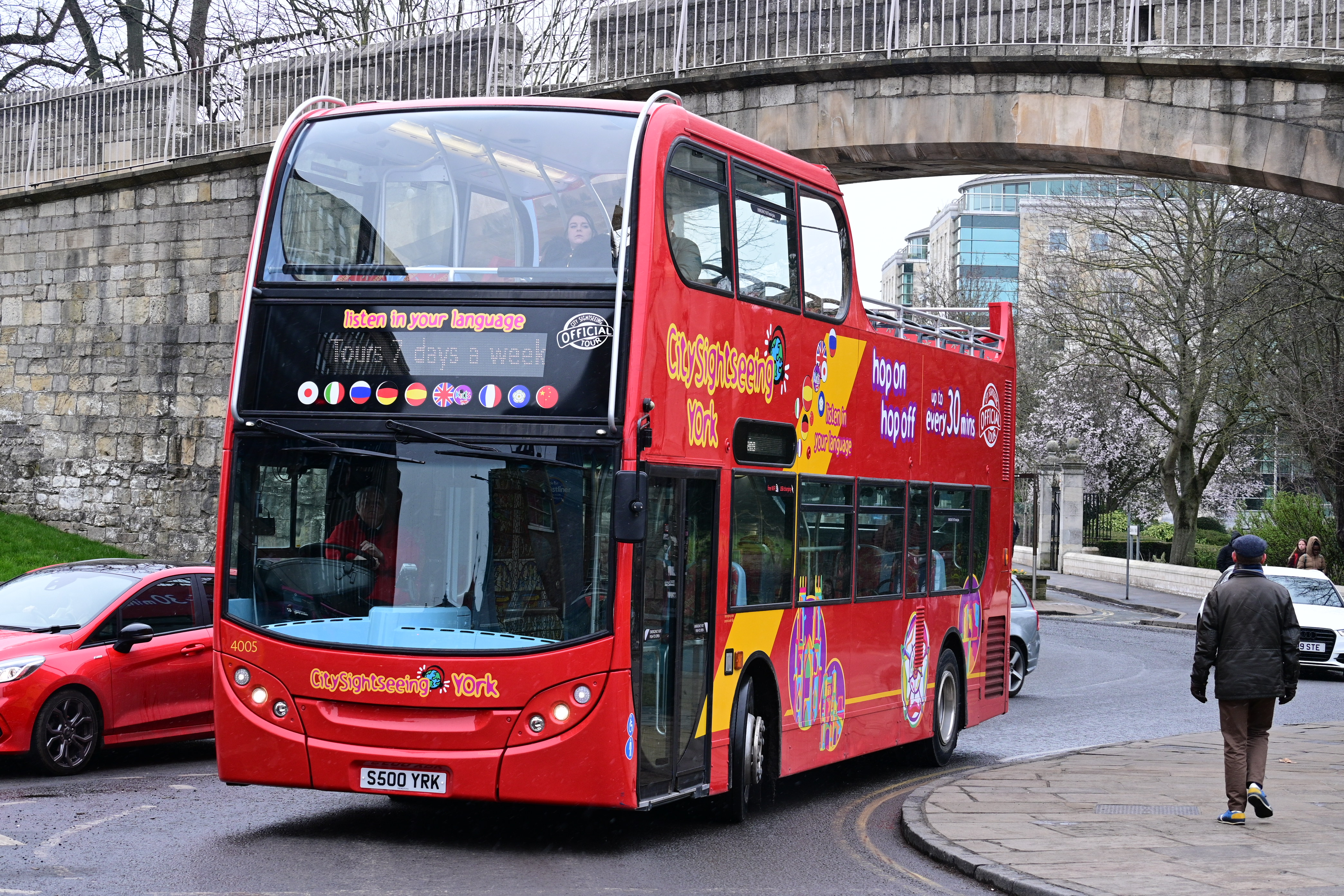
A York City Sightseeing open-top Alexander Dennis Enviro400, in March 2023

Upon the buyout of original franchise operators Top Line Travel in 2008, Yorkshire Coastliner run the York franchise of international tour bus company City Sightseeing. Services are operated by a fleet of Alexander Dennis Enviro400 open-top double-deck vehicles branded in City Sightseeing's red livery.

In 2014, the fleet used on York's sightseeing tours were converted to electric drivetrains by Magtec. This has been regarded to be the first time a double-decker bus had been converted to electric in the world. However in 2020, these vehicles were replaced for ones that are diesel-operated.

== Services ==
As of January 2025, the services operated and respective brands are:

Route	To	From	Via	Brand
14	Woodthorpe	Haxby	Askham Bar, York, Huntington & New Earswick	York & Country
19	Skelton	York	Rawcliffe & Clifton	York & Country
19A	Skelton	York	Rawcliffe & Clifton	York & Country
19X	Skelton	York	Rawcliffe & Clifton	York & Country
20	Rawcliffe	Osbaldwick (Note: Most journeys terminate at Monks Cross.)	Clifton, Haxby, New Earswick, Huntington, Monks Cross & Heworth	York & Country
24	Acomb	Fulford	York	York & Country
25	Derwenthorpe	Fulford	Heworth & York	York & Country
30/30X	Thirsk	York	Sowerby, Birdforth, Thormanby, Raskelf, (Note: Some journeys operate via Raskelf.) Easingwold, Alne, Tollerton, Shipton, Skelton & Clifton	York & Country
	Thirsk	York	Sowerby, Birdforth, Thormanby, Raskelf, Easingwold, Shipton, Skelton & Clifton	York & Country
31X	Kirkbymoorside	York	Helmsley, Sproxton, Oswaldkirk, Ampleforth, Wass, Coxwold, Husthwaite, Easingwold, Shipton, Skelton & Clifton	York & Country
40	Crayke or Easingwold	York	York Hospital, Clifton Moor, Wiggington, Sutton-on-the-Forest, Huby & Stillington	York & Country
74	Grassington	York	Threshfield, Burnsall, Barden, Bolton Abbey, Addingham, Ilkley, Burley-in-Wharfedale, Otley, Spacey Houses, Oatlands, Harrogate, Knaresborough, Kirk Hammerton & Upper Poppleton	York & Country
840	Leeds	Thornton-le-Dale or Whitby	Seacroft, Tadcaster, Copmanthorpe, Askham Bar, York, Heworth, Stockton-on-the-Forest, Malton, Eden Camp, Kirby Misperton, (Note: Kirby Misperton is only served by journeys terminating at Thornton-le-Dale.) Pickering, Goathland, Sleights & Ruswarp	Yorkshire Coastliner
843	Leeds	Scarborough	Seacroft, Tadcaster, Copmanthorpe, Askham Bar, York, Heworth, Stockton-on-the-Forest, Malton, Rillington, Sherburn, Staxton & Seamer	Yorkshire Coastliner
A1	Leeds	Leeds Bradford Airport	Burley, Kirkstall, Horsforth, Rawdon & Yeadon	Flyer
A2	Bradford	Harrogate	Greengates, Apperley Bridge, Rawdon, Yeadon, Leeds Bradford Airport, Pool-in-Wharfedale, Huby, North Rigston, Spacey Houses & Oatlands	Flyer
A3	Bradford	Otley	Manningham, Frizinghall, Shipley, Guiseley, Yeadon, Leeds Bradford Airport & Pool-in-Wharfedale	Flyer

== Former services and brands ==
=== CityZap ===
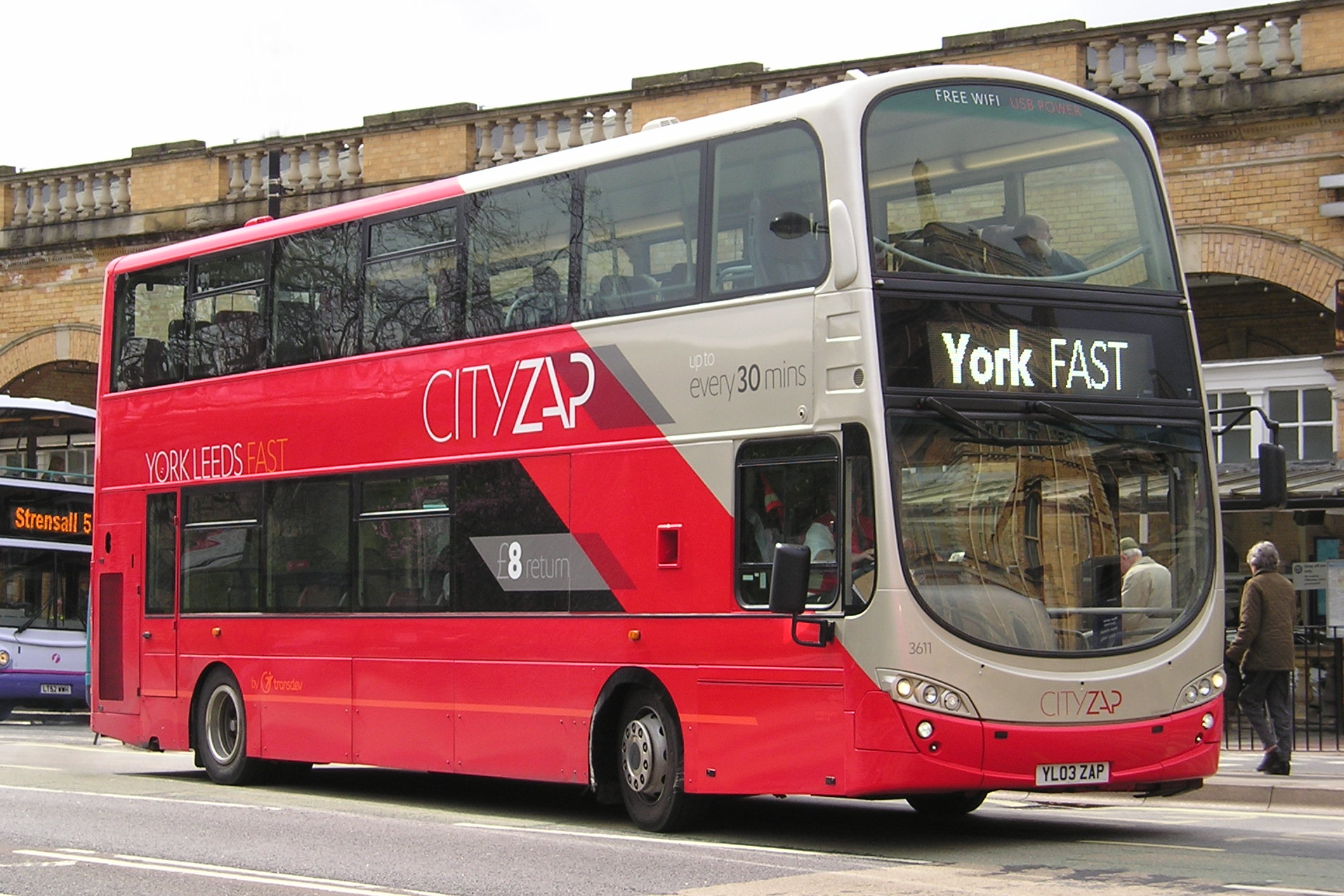
A CityZap branded Wright Eclipse Gemini bodied Volvo B7TL in York, in April 2016

The CityZap brand was introduced on 27 March 2016 as a limited-stop express service running directly between York and Leeds via the A64, A1(M) and M1. The service aimed to attract motorists by offering a faster journey compared to the company's Coastliner service, with journeys taking around 45 minutes between the cities compared to over an hour on the Coastliner, and to provide a competitive alternative to the railway. As of April 2022, the service operated daily, with an hourly frequency during the day. There was no early morning or evening service. (Note: During times where CityZap did not operate, services 840 and 843 operated as an alternative between Leeds and York, with services running via Copmanthorpe, Tadcaster and Seacroft.) The initial success of the route led to the launch of a second CityZap service between Leeds and Manchester, operated by sister company The Burnley Bus Company.

The service was notable for its use of sat-nav equipment to choose the quickest route and avoid congestions.

The service initially ran with a fleet of five Wright Eclipse Gemini bodied Volvo B7TL double-deck vehicles. The vehicles were branded for the route in a silver/red livery, and featured free WiFi and USB charging outlets. In 2020, a fleet of four brand new double-deck Alexander Dennis Enviro400MMC vehicles were ordered – an investment of £1.4 million – and entered service in December 2020. The vehicles were equipped with the company's 'Sky Class' specification, which is promoted as a more luxurious standard, and provides features including free Wi‑Fi, USB and wireless charging points, tables at selected seats, and audio-visual next-stop announcements.

The CityZap service ceased operations on 19 November 2022, with Transdev Blazefield claiming the effects of the COVID-19 pandemic had made running the express service unsustainable.

=== Unibus ===
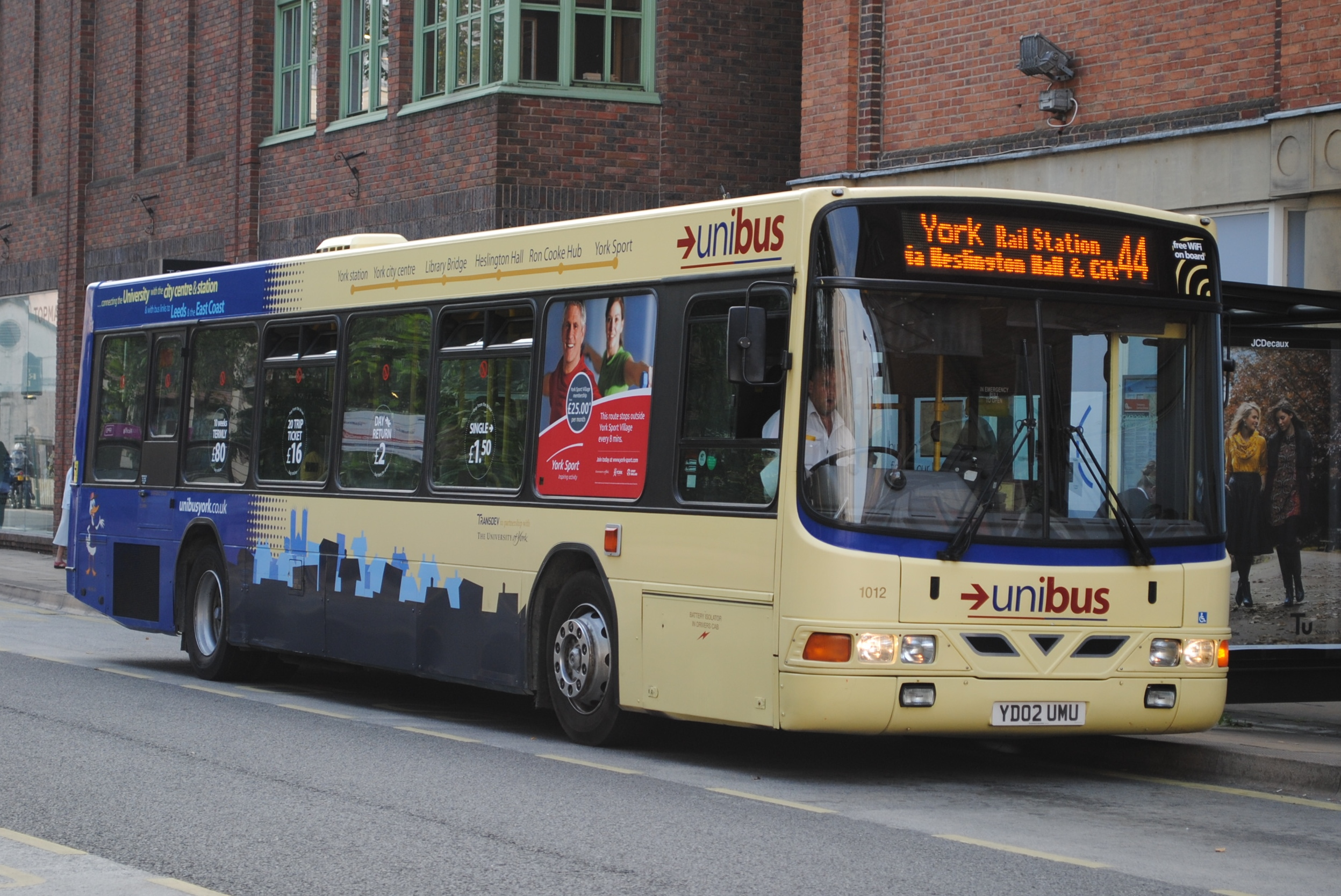
A Unibus Wright Renown bodied Volvo B10BLE, operating service 44 in September 2014

Unibus was the brand name of route 44, connecting York Station with the University of York.

In February 2012, Transdev purchased local services that were operated by York Pullman at the time, including the operation of the Unibus branded service 44, as well as the ub.1 campus shuttle. Shortly after, the route received a refreshed fleet, including the introduction of single-deck Wright Renown bodied Volvo B10BLEs and double-deck Plaxton President bodied Volvo B7TLs to the fleet, as well as the purchase of an Optare Solo SR EV minibus.

In July 2015, with the contract for the Unibus services being awarded to First York, Transdev entered into a bus war with First by continuing to run the route 44 on a commercial basis, rivalling First's new 66 service to the university. Shortly after, Transdev announced that the route 44 will run 24 hours a day and 7 days a week from autumn 2015, which was regarded as the first bus route in York to do so. The Wright Renowns were also upgraded to include a USB charging zone. However, in December 2016, the 44 service was withdrawn, with Transdev stating "lots of other buses running along the route, often copying what we do [...] has made life very difficult for us".

== Fleet and operations ==
=== Depots ===
As of January 2025, the company operates from two depots: Idle (Bradford) and Rawcliffe (York), as well as an outstation in Malton.

=== Vehicles ===
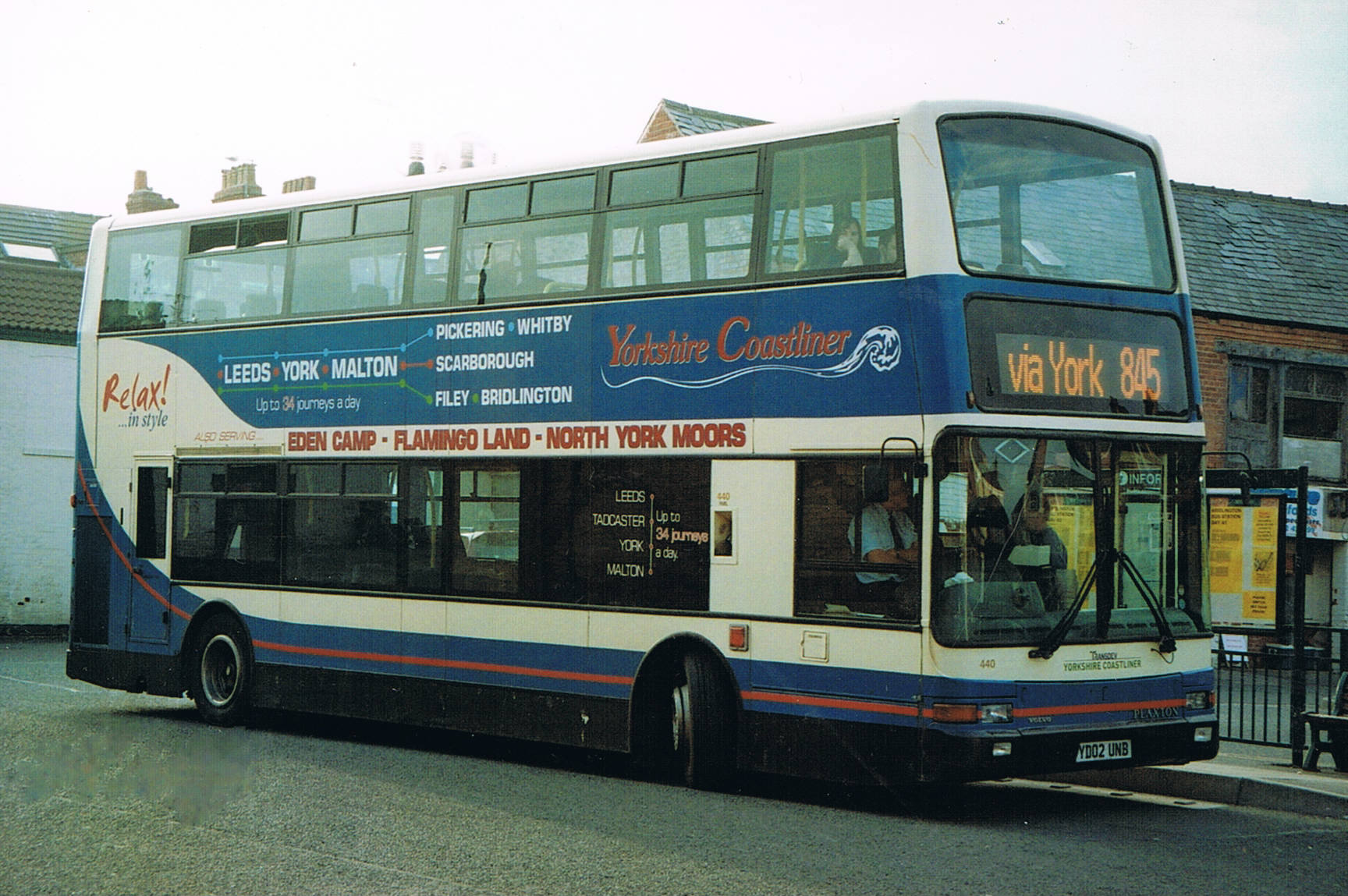
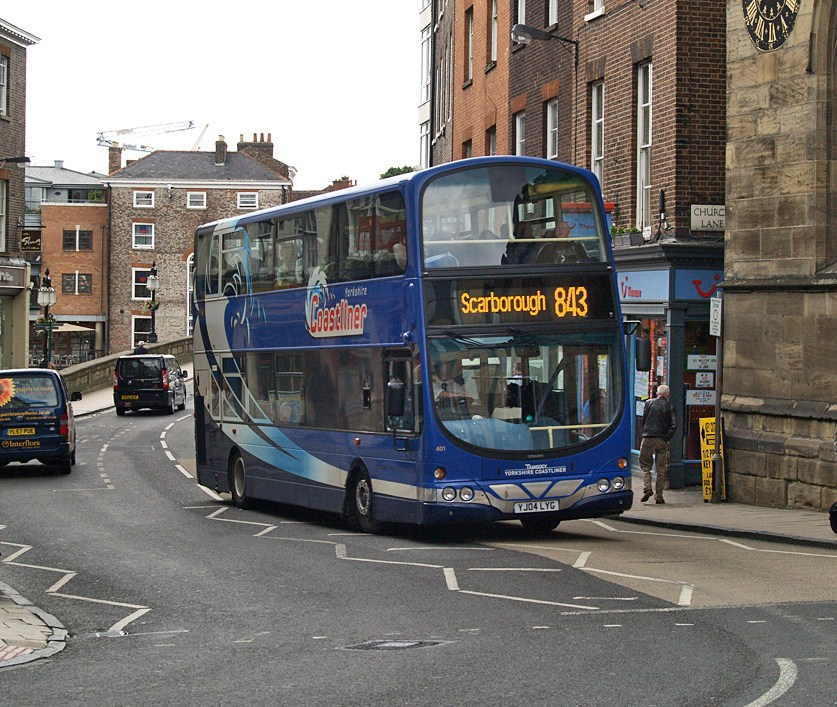
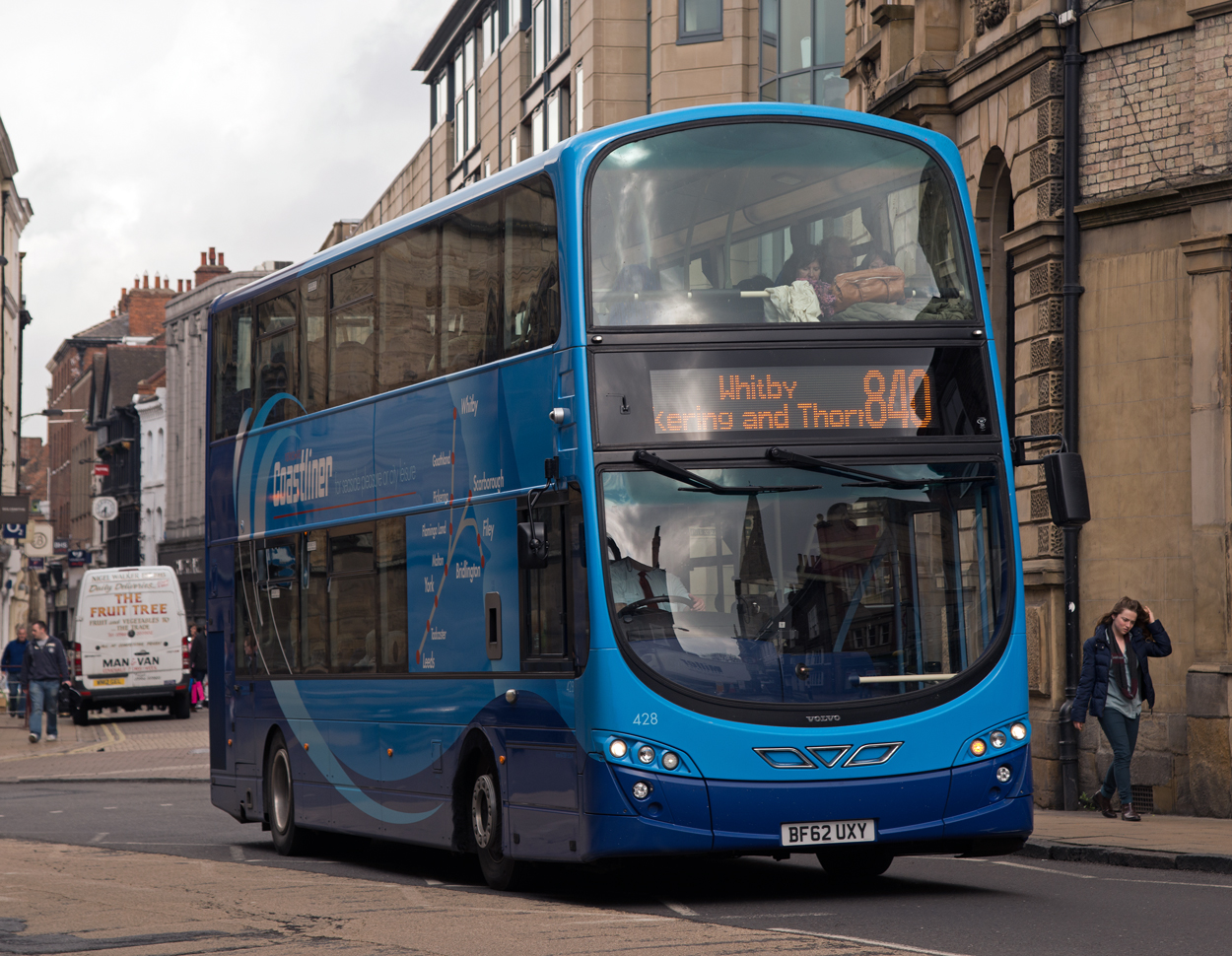
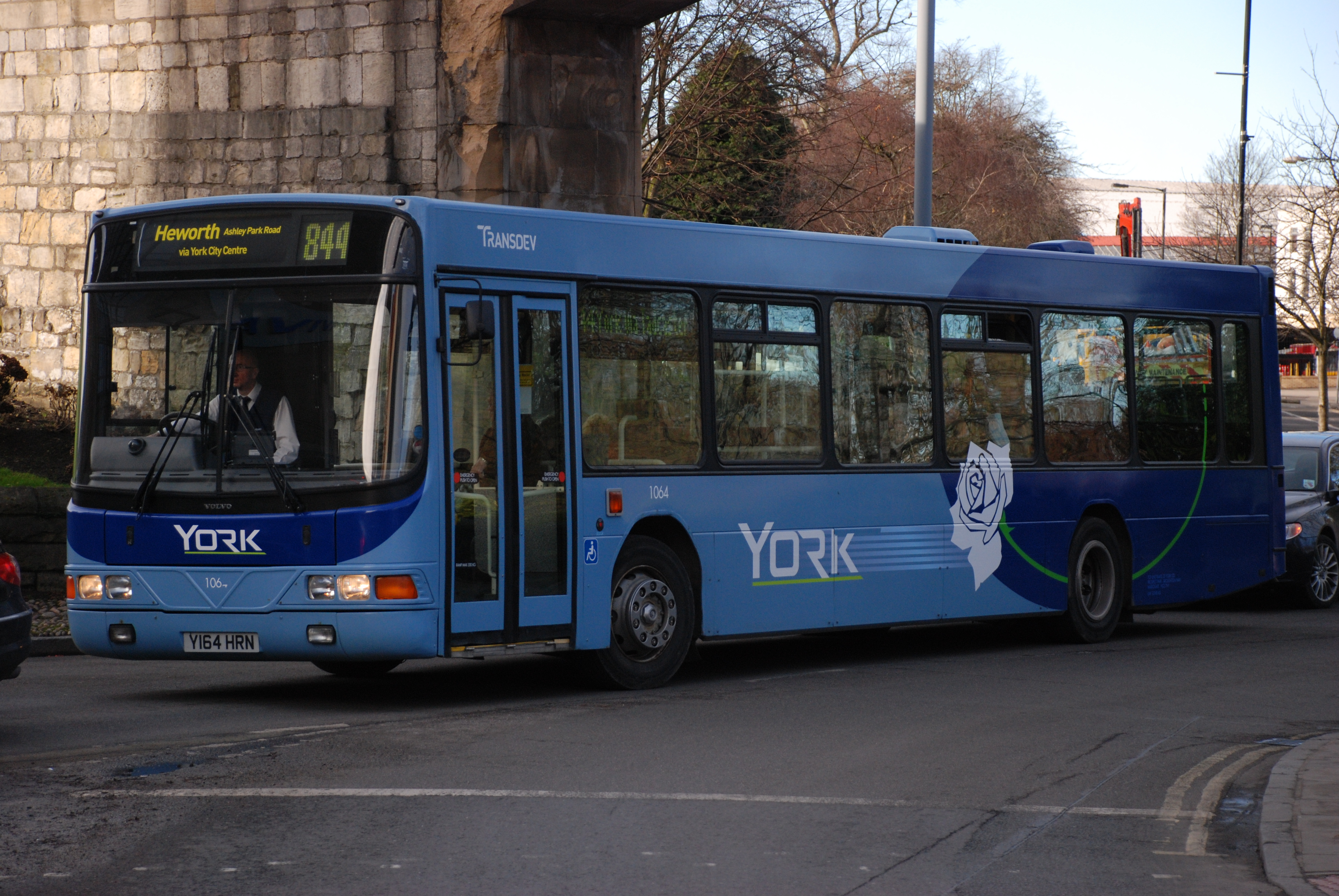
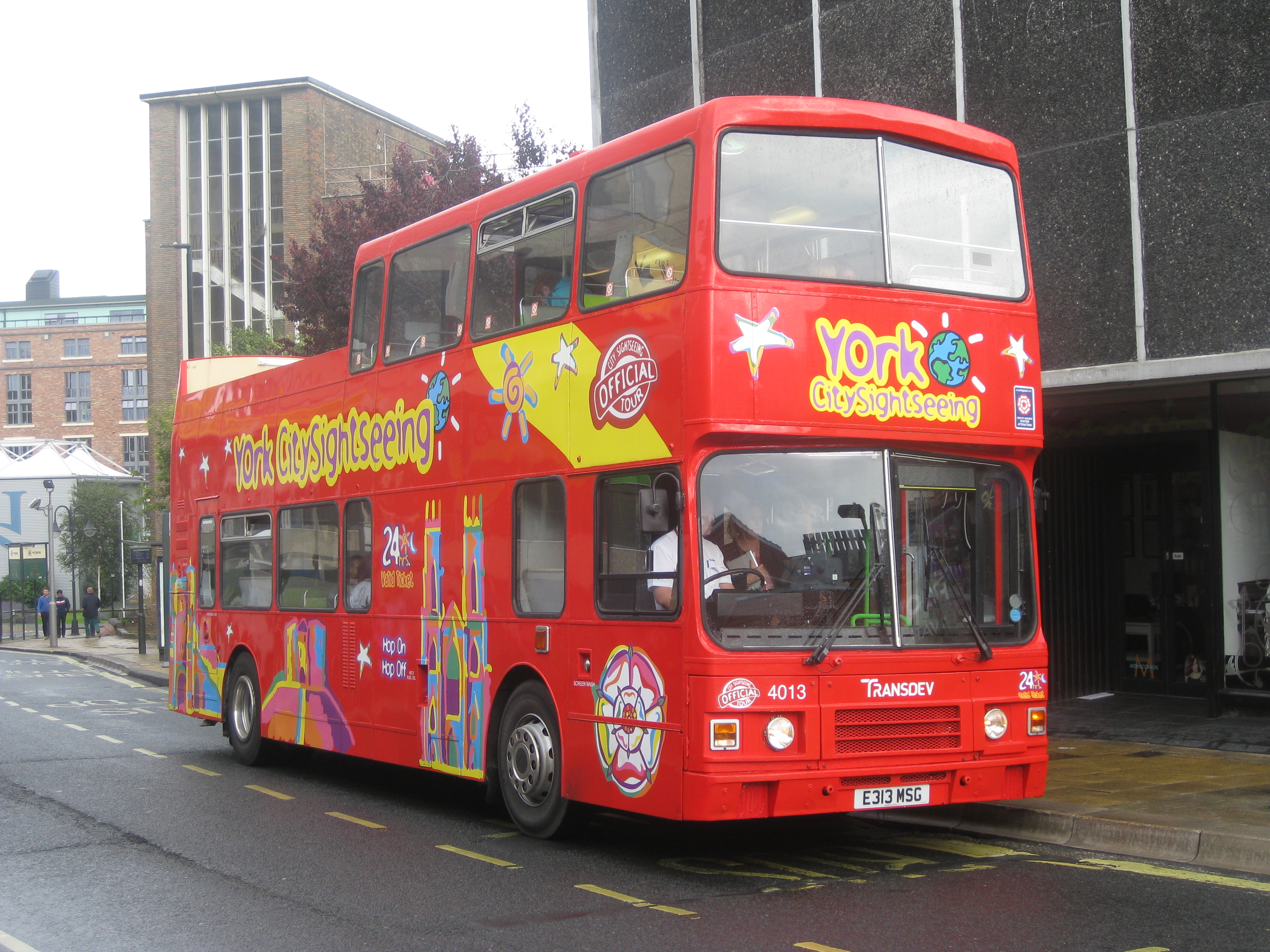
A selection of historic buses and liveries/brands previously used by Yorkshire Coastliner

As of May 2021, the fleet consists of 57 buses. The fleet consists mainly of diesel-powered mini, single and double-deck buses manufactured by Mellor, Optare, Alexander Dennis, Wrightbus.

Fleet No.	Vehicle	Livery	Depot
66–67	Mellor Strata/Mercedes-Benz Sprinter	Transdev Go	Rawcliffe
210–293	Optare Versa	Flyer	Idle
210–293	Optare Versa	Transdev Go	Idle
210–293	Optare Versa	York & Country	Rawcliffe
751–755	Alexander Dennis Enviro 200 MMC	York & Country	Rawcliffe
582–583	Alexander Dennis Enviro 200 MMC	Reliance	Rawcliffe
1773	Volvo B7RLE/Wright Eclipse 2	Reliance	Rawcliffe
1774	Volvo B8RLE/Wright Eclipse 3	Reliance	Rawcliffe
1901–1902	Volvo B8RLE/MCV Evora	Reliance	Rawcliffe
2410	Volvo B9TL/Wright Gemini 1	Reliance (ex-Lothian)	Rawcliffe
2421–2780	Volvo B9TL/Wright Gemini 2	Yorkshire Coastliner	Malton & Rawcliffe
3629–3644	Volvo B5TL/Wright Gemini 3	Yorkshire Coastliner	Malton & Rawcliffe
4001–4006	Alexander Dennis Enviro 400	York City Sightseeing	Rawcliffe
4007	DAF DB250LF/Plaxton President	York City Sightseeing	Rawcliffe
