= Flyer (bus service) =

Airport bus services in West and North Yorkshire, England

- A1, A2 and A3

- A Flyer Mercedes-Benz Citaro hybrid electric bus in Shipley operating service A3 in October 2026

Overview
- Operator: Transdev Blazefield
- Garage: Idle, Bradford
- Peak vehicle requirement: 11 (at July 2024)
- Began service: August 2020; 6 years ago

Route
- Locale: North Yorkshire; West Yorkshire
- Start: Leeds Bradford Airport, Harrogate or Otley
- End: Leeds or Bradford
- Timetable: transdevbus.co.uk/flyer/

Flyer is the brand name of a trio of local bus services, which link Leeds Bradford Airport with the cities of Bradford and Leeds, and towns of Harrogate and Otley.

== History ==
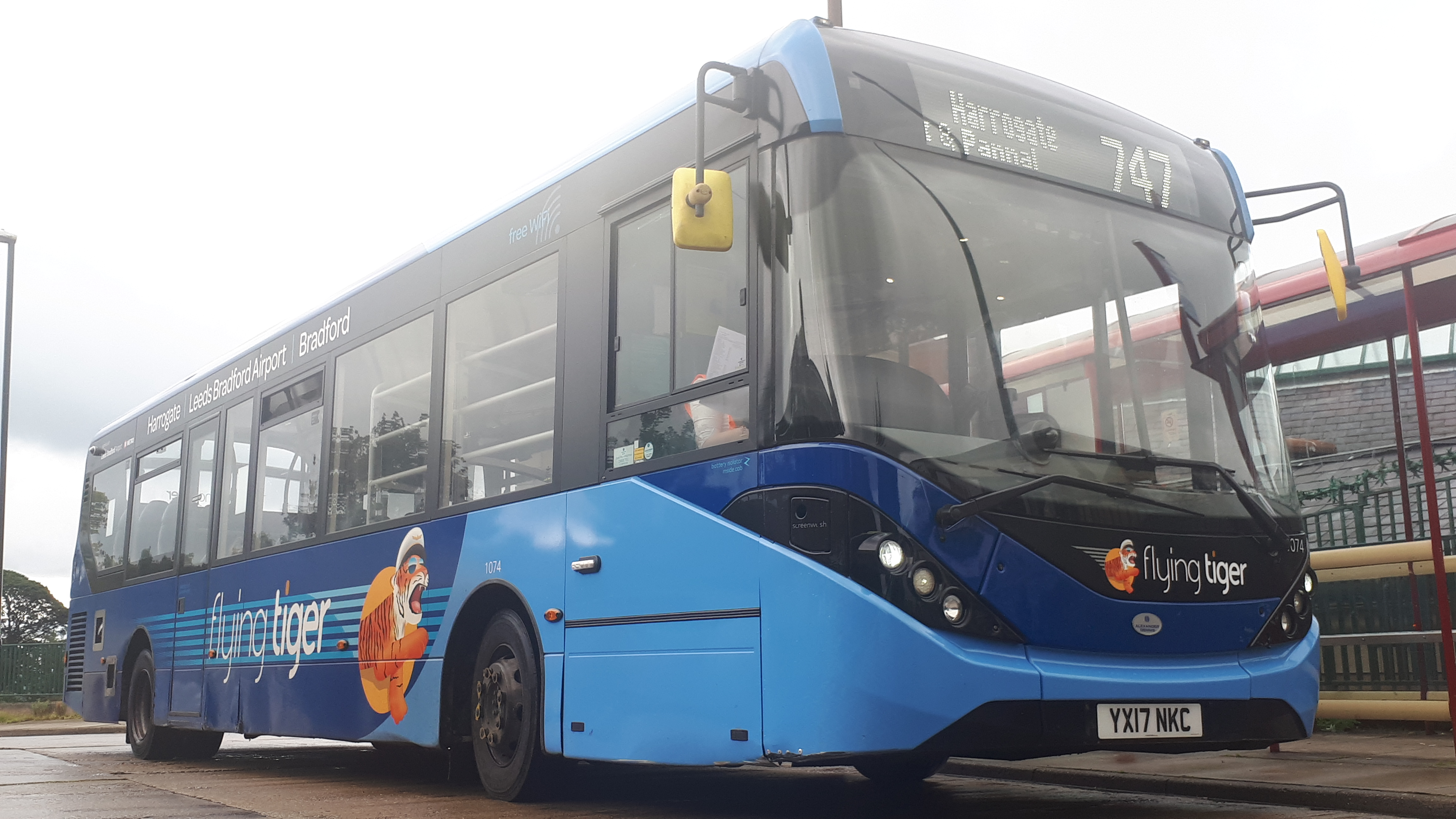
'Flying Tiger' branded Alexander Dennis Enviro200 MMC operated by Yorkshire Tiger in August 2020

The route was formerly operated under the Centrebus brand as Airport Direct.

In May 2014, the routes were rebranded by Yorkshire Tiger as Flying Tiger and new Optare Versa buses were introduced. On 3 July 2017, new Alexander Dennis Enviro200 MMC buses were introduced on route 737 and 747 alongside the previous Optare Versa vehicles which continued to operate mainly on service 757.

In 2020, Yorkshire Tiger stopped running the 757 route. It had previously been operated on a commercial basis however this was no longer viable during the COVID-19 pandemic. The West Yorkshire Combined Authority subsequently awarded a temporary contract to CT Plus who operated the route under the Runway 757 brand. In August 2020, Yorkshire Coastliner took over operation of all three routes and also acquired the Yorkshire Tiger depot in Idle. The routes were renumbered A1, A2 and A3.

As of 2024, service A1 now operates at a half-hourly frequency (and finishes service two-hours earlier compared to its previous timetable), whilst services A2 and A3 each operate at an hourly frequency. Service A2 has had its Harrogate night services recently withdrawn whilst service A3 has had an extension to its route added in Otley (Newall) on evenings to substitute the Otley Dash service which Transdev withdrew in 2023.

The fleet of Optare Versa buses were replaced by a fleet of 15 Mercedes-Benz Citaro hybrid electric single-deck vehicles, an order worth £4 million, which entered service by the end of 2025.

The operation of these Leeds Bradford Airport services is set to be transferred to Tower Transit as Contract 8 of the Round One Tier B contracts for the Weaver Network from May 2027.

== Services ==
As of October 2024, the services operated under the Flyer brand are:

Route	To	From	Via
A1	Leeds	Leeds Bradford Airport	Burley, Kirkstall, Horsforth, Rawdon & Yeadon
A2	Bradford	Harrogate	Greengates, Apperley Bridge, Rawdon, Yeadon, Leeds Bradford Airport, Pool-in-Wharfedale, Huby, North Rigston, Spacey Houses & Oatlands
A3	Bradford	Otley	Manningham, Frizinghall, Shipley, Guiseley, Yeadon, Leeds Bradford Airport & Pool-in-Wharfedale
