= Halifax Joint Committee =

British bus operating company

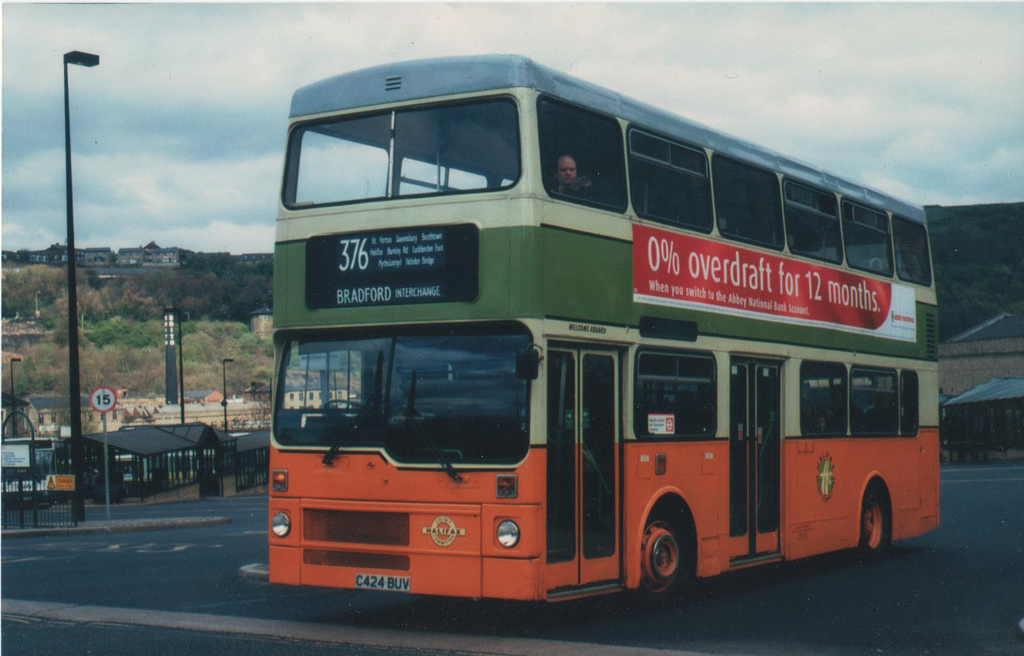
- MCW Metrobus in 2002
- Parent: Anthony Roger Blackman
- Founded: 1995
- Ceased operation: 2014
- Headquarters: Halifax
- Service area: West Yorkshire
- Service type: Bus services & private hire

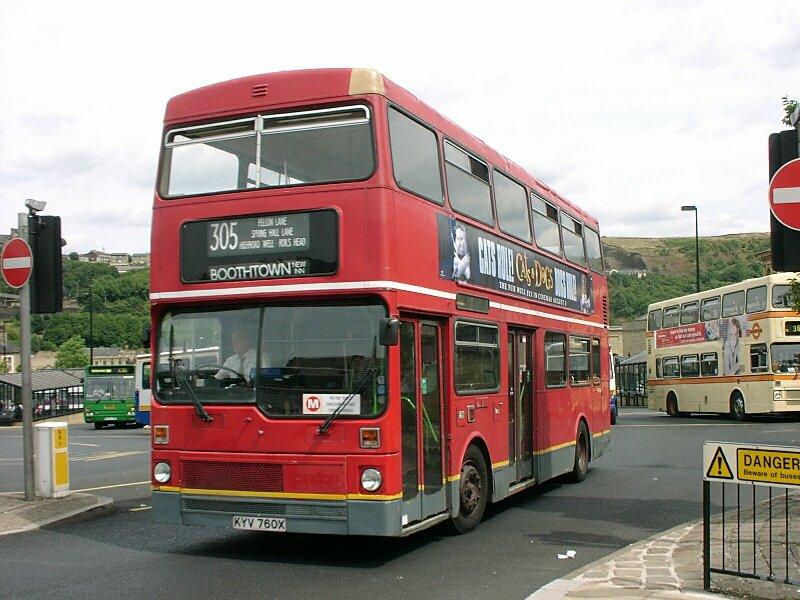
MCW Metrobus in as purchased London General livery in July 2001

Halifax Joint Committee was an independent bus company operating in and around Halifax, West Yorkshire, England. Its buses were painted in the livery of the former County Borough of Halifax whose buses and services were taken over by the West Yorkshire Passenger Transport Executive in April 1974.

== Vehicles ==
The company started off running a heritage bus service from Halifax along the Calder Valley to Hebden Bridge using an AEC Regent III (BCP 671).

The company expanded to running commercial bus services using 4 Park Royal AEC Routemasters. Looking for an OPO vehicle, they bought an ex-London Transport MCW Metrobus (BYX 273V). They continued purchasing ex-LT MCW Metrobuses along with two Leyland Titans and Leyland Nationals. The Titans and the Nationals didn't last as long as expected and were replaced by more ex-LT Metrobuses and Dennis Darts. 2007 saw the purchase of a Leyland Olympian (F234 YTJ), and 2008 saw the purchase of number of ex-Dublin Bus Leyland Olympians.

The proprietor also operated a growing heritage fleet of ex-municipal vehicles on private charters.

Bus Sales - A number of buses have been sold on for further use,

MCW Metrobus:

1. B294 WUL - converted open top for SS Suncruisers, Scarborough.
2. C387 BUV - W E Jones, Llanerchymedd.
3. JHE 161W - sold for preservation in South Yorkshire.
4. C424 BUV - Sold for preservation in West Yorkshire to be restored as a Halifax Joint Committee Metrobus

== Services ==
Halifax Joint Committee mainly ran services in the Halifax area with some services running to Bradford (509 - originally to Leeds Eastgate), Brighouse, Dewsbury, Hebden Bridge, Huddersfield, and Todmorden. The company also ran school services in the Calderdale and Kirklees area. From July 2009, the company started its first commercial service wholly outside of the Halifax area when they took over the operation of route 357 from First West Yorkshire with a second gained in January 2010, when they took over route 629 from the same operator.

In October 2010, Halifax Joint Committee stopped running four of its Halifax services, the 28A, 31, 34 and 36, with the services passing to Centrebus and K-Line. This meant that the company's only services in Halifax was the 392 schoolday service towards Walsden and the C68 service linking the town's bus station to the nearby Sainsbury's.

In July 2013, Halifax Joint Committee withdrew from all their school and college contracts which led to the withdrawal of their final stage carriage route 392. The company sold all of their Olympians, scrapped two Metrobuses and sold one for preservation (C424 BUV). On 31 March 2014, the last MCW Metrobus (B162 WUL) left the fleet for scrap, with two Dennis Darts (L126 YOD & P509 RYM) remaining for the C68 and C70 shoppers routes.

May 2014 saw the end of Halifax Joint Committee. Friday 2 May 2014 was the last day of the C68 Sainsbury's and Saturday 3 May 2014 was the last day of the C70 Tesco Free Bus.
