= Team Pennine =

Transdev-owned bus operator

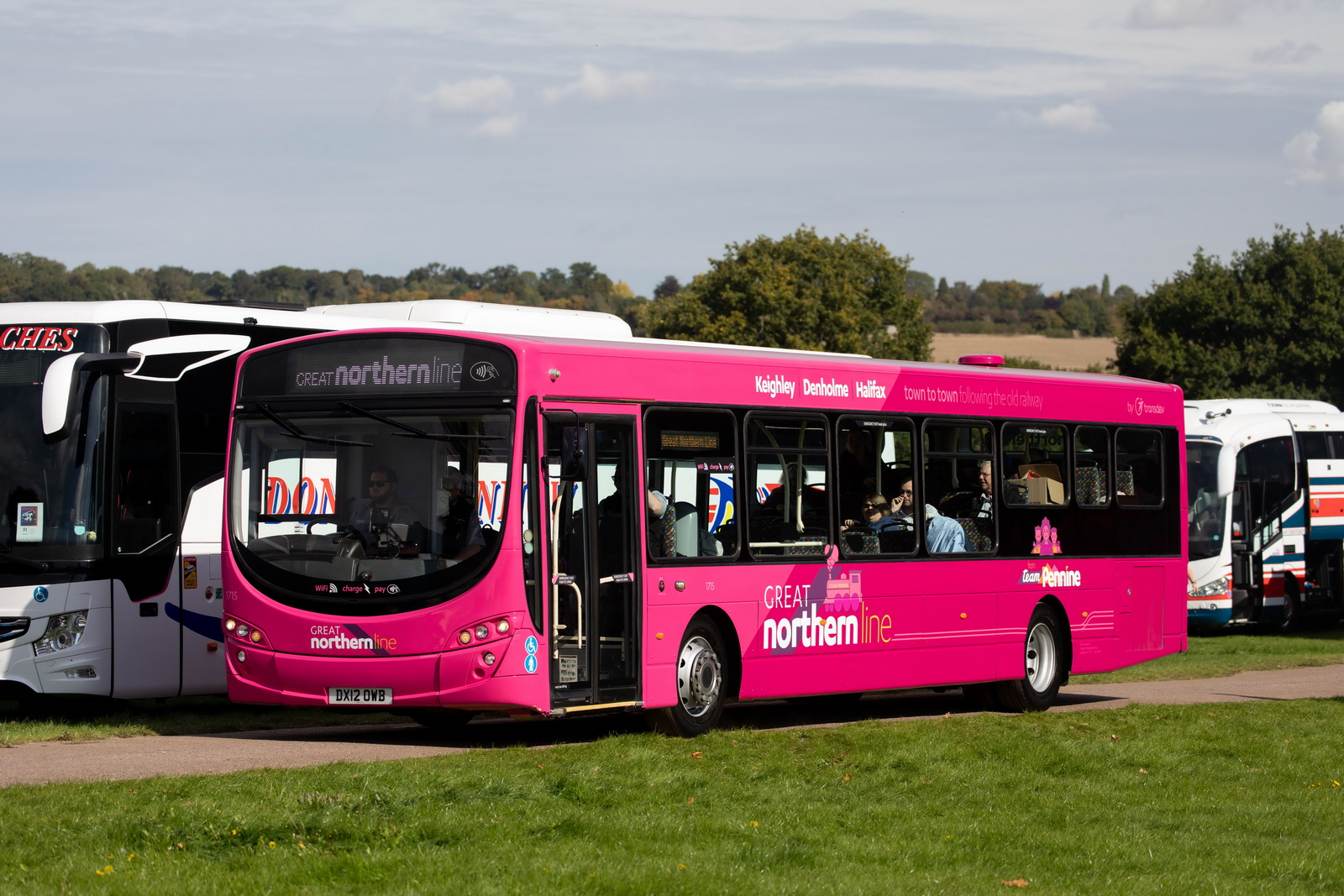
- Great Northern Line Wright Eclipse 2 bodied Volvo B7RLE at Showbus 2022
- Parent: Transdev Blazefield
- Founded: 2008
- Headquarters: Harrogate, England
- Service area: West Yorkshire
- Service type: Bus and coach
- Depots: 2
- Fleet: 54 (August 2023)
- Managing Director: Henri Rohard
- Website: transdevbus.co.uk/team-pennine/

Team Pennine operates both local and regional bus services in West Yorkshire, England. It is a subsidiary of Transdev Blazefield, which operates bus services across Greater Manchester, Lancashire, North Yorkshire and West Yorkshire.

== History ==
=== Stagecoach Yorkshire ===
In December 2005, Stagecoach Yorkshire purchased the operations of Yorkshire Traction in Huddersfield – a deal valued at £37 million. At the time, with a total of 840 vehicles, The Traction Group was Britain's sixth-largest bus group and the largest of which to be privately owned.

In March 2008, it was reported that Arriva UK Bus were in discussions with Stagecoach Yorkshire to purchase its bus operations in Huddersfield.

Arriva Yorkshire already operated services in the town, so purchasing Stagecoach's operations would enlarge its presence. At the time Arriva registered a trading name of K Line, registered on the Arriva Yorkshire licence.

In May 2008, Centrebus Holdings was successful in purchasing the operations. Centrebus Holdings was owned by three directors of Centrebus, who together owned 56%, with Arriva UK Bus owning the remaining 44%. Despite the common name and livery, Centrebus Holdings has never been owned by Centrebus.

In August 2008, Arriva Midlands sold its Hinckley depot to Centrebus Holdings. In the following month, the company purchased the bus operations of Woods Coaches of Leicester.

Following the Arriva takeover in September 2013, the Hinckley-based operations were rebranded as Hinckley Bus.

In 2019, the company's operations in Hinckley were amalgamated with the Leicester operations of Arriva Midlands, with the depot serving as an outstation for the company's South Wigston depot.

=== Centrebus Holdings ===
Following the purchase of K-Line and Stagecoach Huddersfield, Centrebus Holdings became the second-largest bus operator in Huddersfield, after First West Yorkshire. The company retained the K-Line brand, whilst operating the former Stagecoach services under the Huddersfield Bus Company brand. The Centrebus name was used for the rest of the operations in West Yorkshire.

In January 2010, Centrebus Holdings took over some contracted services previously operated by First West Yorkshire in Calderdale. As a result, a new depot was established in Elland.

In April 2010, Centrebus Holdings obtained another service under the Huddersfield Bus Company division, taking over two routes (435 & 436) from Arriva Yorkshire. At the same time, the company extended further, taking over three routes serving Leeds Bradford Airport (737, 747 & 757). Like the operations in Calderdale, these services operated under the Centrebus name, with a depot based on Kirkstall Road, Leeds.

The company would face early competition as First West Yorkshire continued to run service 757 between Leeds and Leeds Bradford Airport via Horsforth, serving the railway station in Leeds, whilst Centrebus served the City bus station.

From July 2010, Centrebus were the only operator of route 757 after First West Yorkshire withdrew its service. At the same time, Centrebus began to operate many more services in Bradford and Leeds, winning a number of contracts from West Yorkshire Metro.

In October 2010, a number of services formerly operated by Halifax Joint Committee (28A, 34 & 36) were taken over by Centrebus, with K-Line taking over service 31.

In 2012, service A99, which ran during term-time on behalf of the University of Bradford was taken over by Centrebus – having previously been operated by First West Yorkshire. At the same time, the service was made free to use for university students.

=== Yorkshire Tiger ===
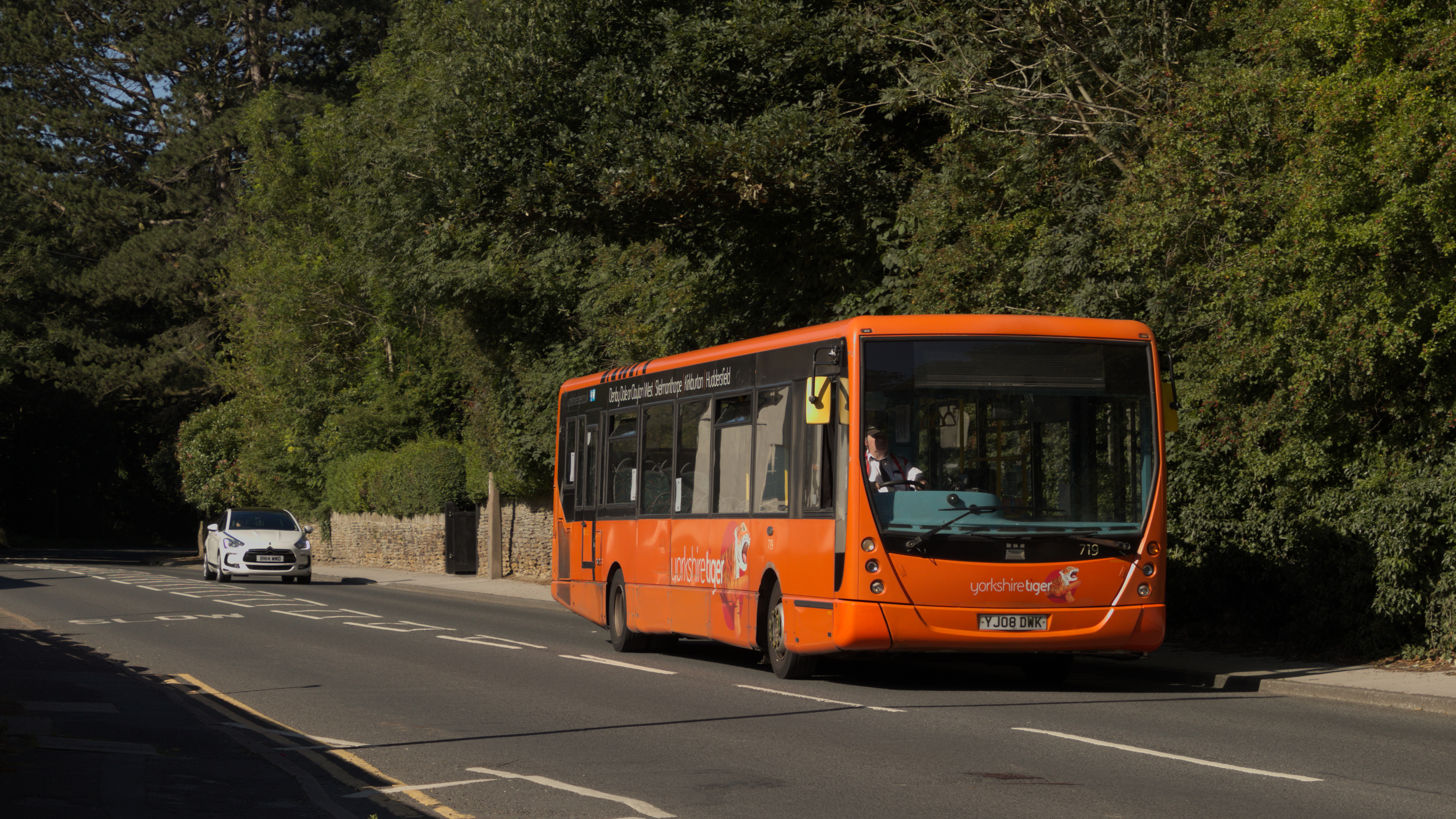
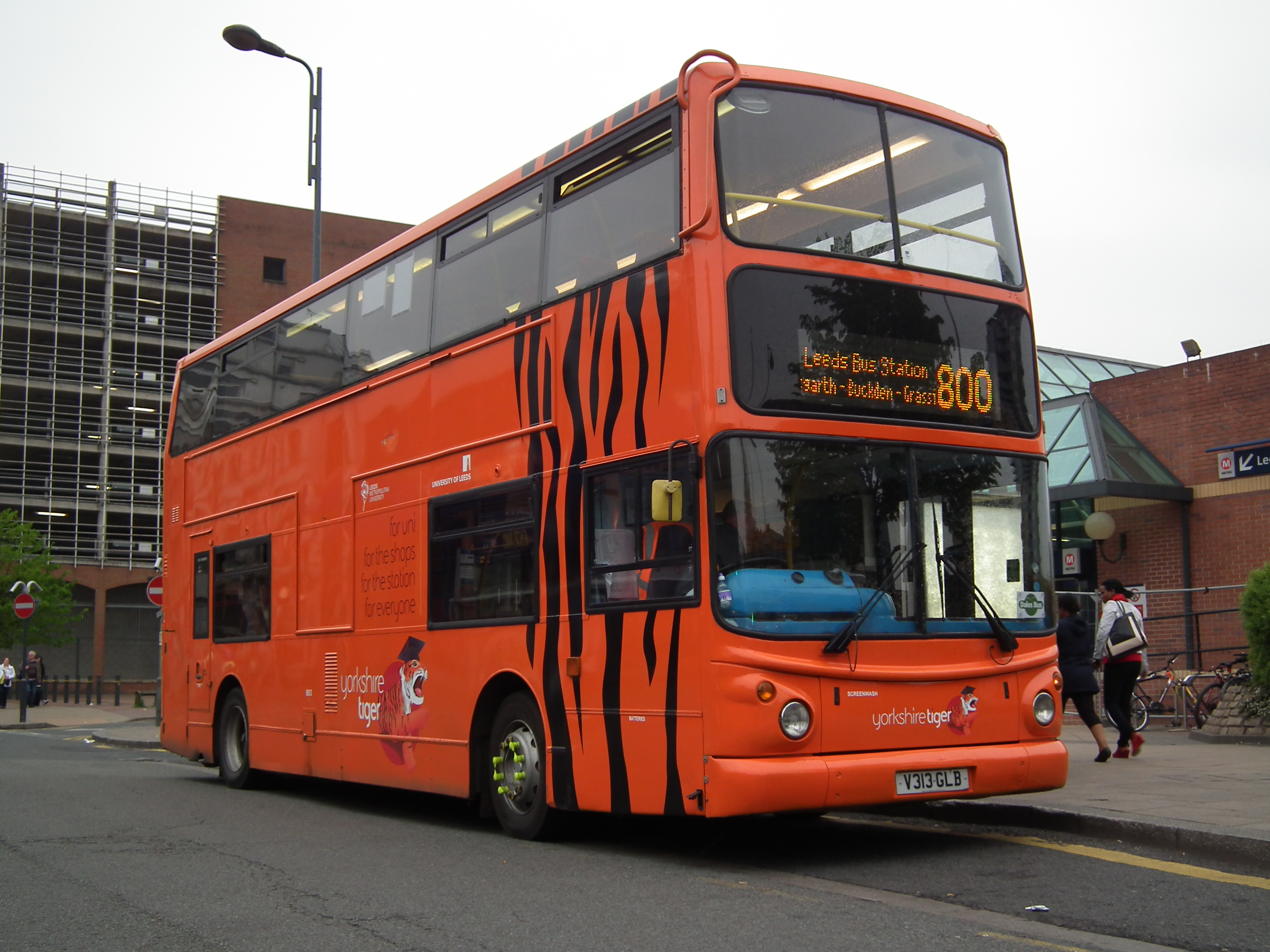
A Yorkshire Tiger branded Plaxton Centro (left) and Dennis Trident 2/ALX400 (right).

In September 2013, Arriva UK Bus bought out its partners and rebranded the company Yorkshire Tiger. The fleet was gradually repainted into a new brand identity, consisting of an orange base, featuring a tiger print pattern. In Calderdale, many of the contracted services were rebranded under a new sub-brand, Calder Cubs.

In December 2015, a fire at the company's Elland depot saw a total of ten vehicles destroyed.

In June 2016, Yorkshire Tiger saw the loss of a number of contracts in and around Leeds. As such, the company's Kirkstall Road depot was closed and demolished, with the operation of the Leeds Bradford Airport network of services transferred to a dedicated depot at Idle. In January 2017, Yorkshire Tiger acquired a number of contracts in South Yorkshire, which saw the opening of a new depot opened at Wombwell.

In May 2018, a number of contracts were gained in Bradford, with eight Optare Solo single-deck vehicles subsequently acquired from Arriva North East to operate these services, based at Idle. Four months later, the South Yorkshire contracts were re-tendered to other operators, which saw the closure of the recently opened depot at Wombwell. At the same time, a number of changes were made to the Huddersfield network, which saw the closure of the former K-Line depot at Honley, with all operations transferred to Waterloo.

In August 2020, Yorkshire Tiger ceased operation in Bradford, opting not to re-bid for the Leeds Bradford Airport network of services, as well as withdrawing the network of local services in and around the town. The contract for the Leeds Bradford Airport network of services was transferred to Transdev York & Country, with the local services in Bradford re-tendered to TLC Travel – the former operator of most of the contracted services.

==== Flying Tiger ====
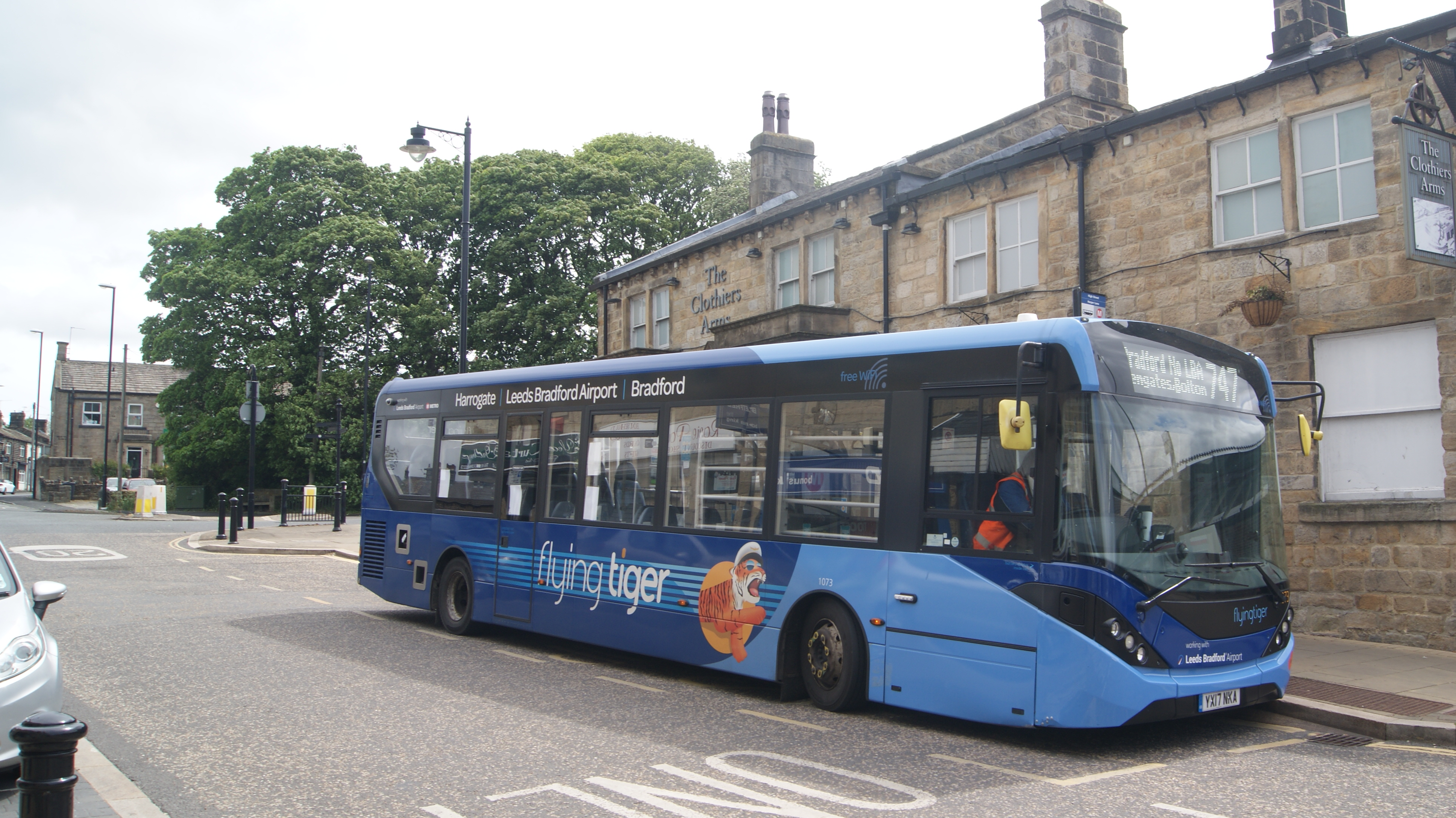
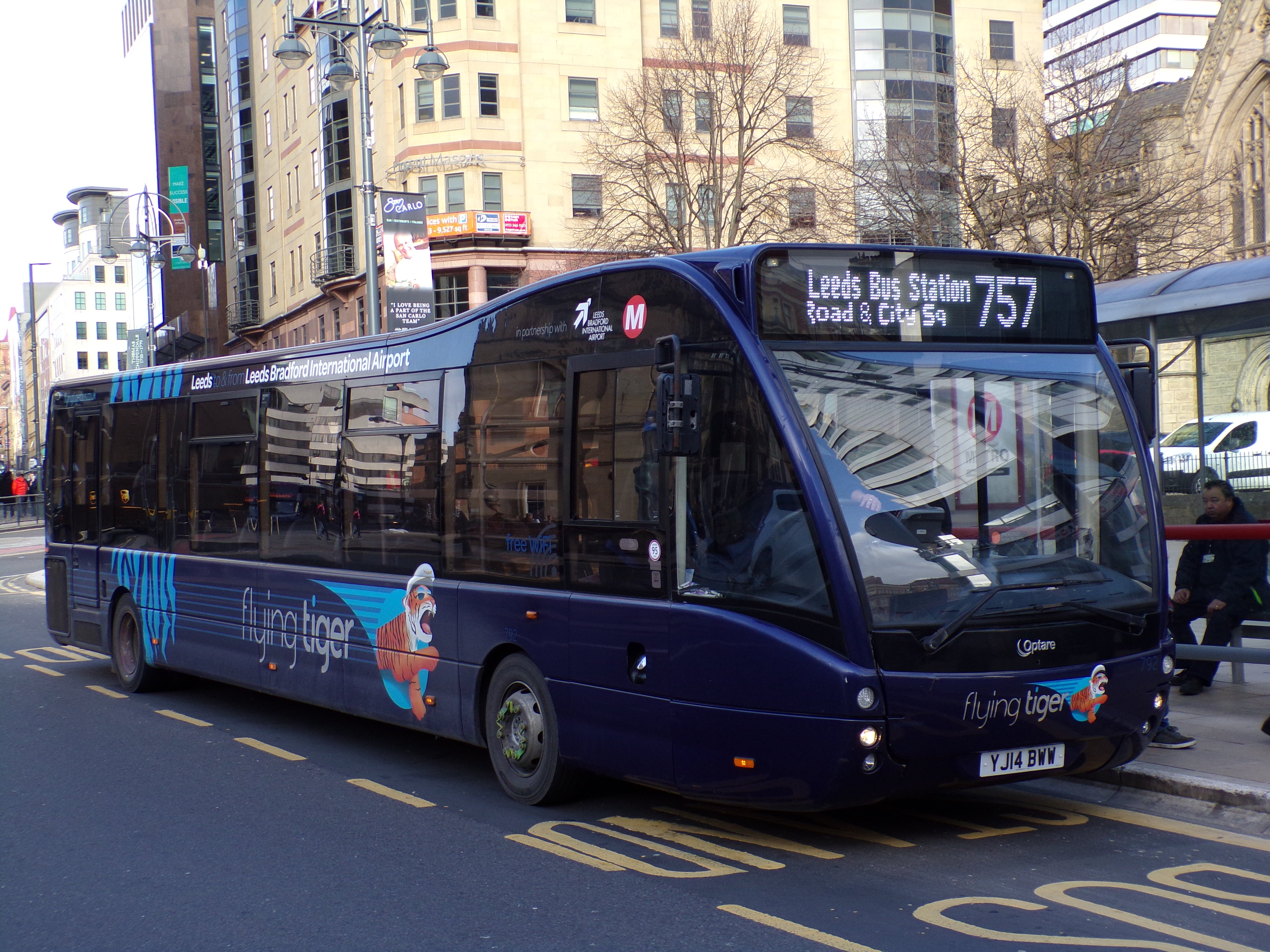
A Flying Tiger branded Alexander Dennis Enviro 200 MMC (left) and Optare Versa (right).

In July 2014, Yorkshire Tiger rebranded its network of services linking Bradford, Harrogate and Leeds with Leeds Bradford Airport – an investment totalling £750,000. Investment saw the refurbishment and rebranding of the existing fleet of Scania OmniCity single-deck vehicles, as well as the introduction of a new fleet of Optare Versa single-deck vehicles. In July 2017, further investment saw the introduction of a fleet of Alexander Dennis Enviro 200 MMC single-deck vehicles.

In September 2020, the contract for the network of Leeds Bradford Airport services was transferred to Transdev York & Country, with services rebranded Flyer and renumbered A1 (Horsforth & Leeds), A2 (Bradford & Harrogate) and A3 (Bradford, Guiseley & Shipley).

=== Tiger Blue & K-Line ===
Tiger Blue (formerly known as K-Line) was a bus operator based in Honley, West Yorkshire. The company operated a number of local bus services in and around Kirklees.

Founded in 1980, the company initially operating out of a garage in Kirkburton. Six years later, following the deregulation of bus services, the company began operating a number of commercial services in Huddersfield, as well as tendered services in Elland.

In November 1993, K-Line was purchased by Pride of the Road Group, with operations transferred to a depot at Honley five years later.

In May 2008, K-Line was purchased by Centrebus Holdings. However, it continued to trade as a separate entity from Centrebus. In January 2010, Centrebus Holdings took over some contracted services in Calderdale, which previously operated by First West Yorkshire.

After Arriva wholly purchased Centrebus Holdings in September 2013, it was decided to rebrand most of the business as Yorkshire Tiger, whilst retaining K-Line as a separate brand. In October 2014, Arriva rebranded K-Line as Tiger Blue – bringing the company in line with the overall Yorkshire Tiger brand.

From June 2017, as a result of increased flexibility between the operation of what was traditionally Honley-based ex-K-Line routes and Waterloo-based former Huddersfield Bus Company routes, the Tiger Blue brand was gradually phased out. Subsequent repaints saw vehicles rebranded into the standard Yorkshire Tiger livery.

In September 2018, following reductions to a number of Waterloo-based services, the decision was made to combine operations in Huddersfield, resulting in the closure of the depot at Honley. Most routes formerly operated out of Honley were transferred to Waterloo, with the two fleets merged.

=== Acquisition by Transdev Blazefield ===
In April 2021, Transdev Blazefield agreed terms to purchase the business. The sale took effect on 25 July 2021, and included 163 staff, 69 vehicles and two depots. The business was subsequently rebranded Team Pennine.

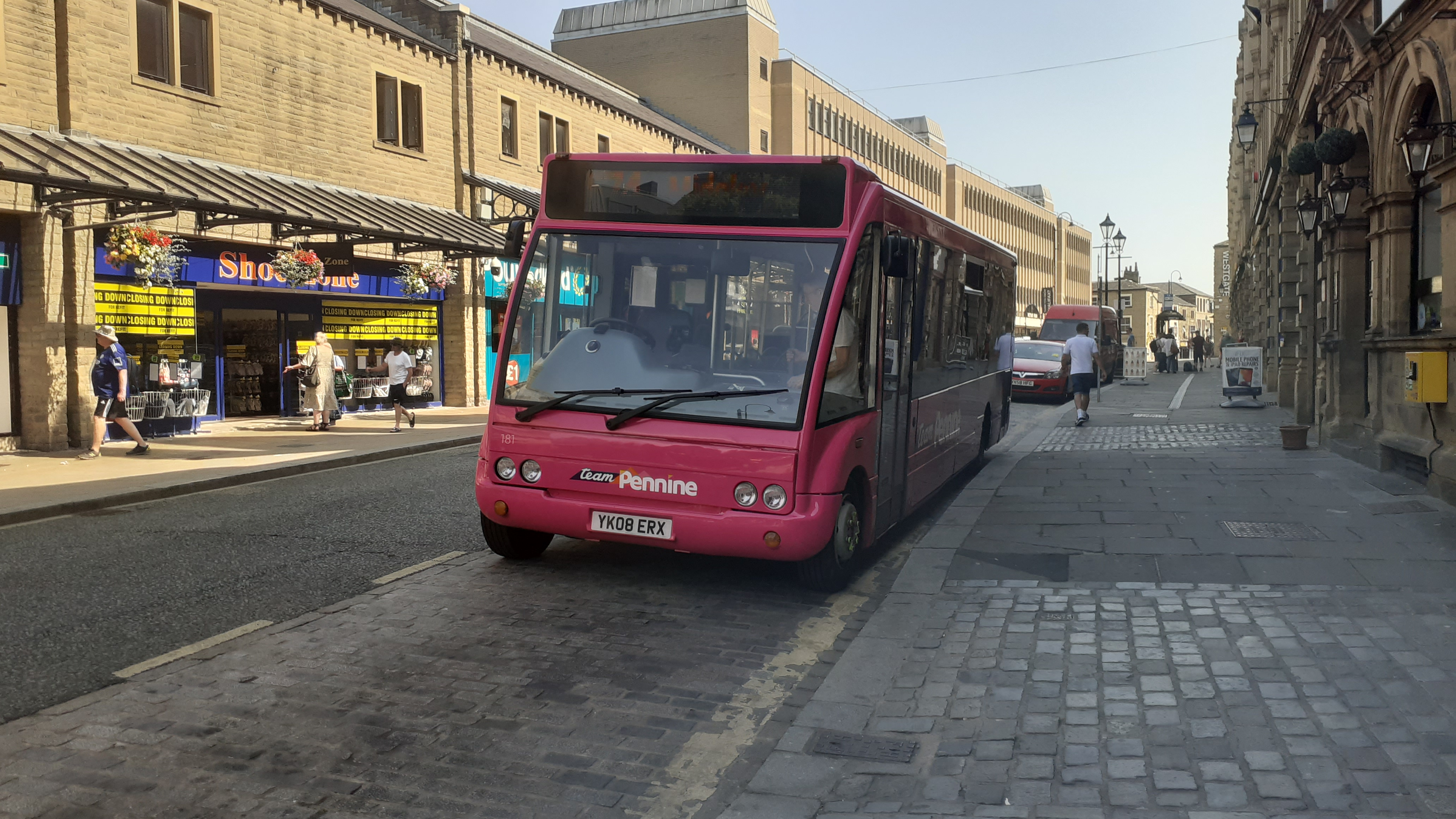
A refurbished Team Pennine Optare Solo M950 parked up on Halifax Market Street.

== Services and branding ==
=== Calder Country ===
The Calder Country brand was introduced in November 2021 – representing an £800,000 investment in the area. The brand encompasses five local bus services (530, 546, 561, 562 & 577), which operate in and around Calderdale, with destinations including Barkisland, Boulderclough, Fountainhead, Halifax, Norland and Soyland. Services are operated by a fleet of Mellor Strata minibuses, branded in a two-tone pink livery. Features include free WiFi and audio-visual next stop announcements.

=== Denby Darts ===
The Denby Darts brand encompasses three bus services (D1, D2 & D3), which operate between Denby Dale and Huddersfield via Skelmanthorpe (D1) or Shepley (D2 & D3). The D1 service was introduced in July 2021, and operates half-hourly, with an hourly service during the evening and on Sunday. Services D2 and D3 were introduced in May 2022, and operate at a two-hourly frequency (Monday–Saturday), with a combined hourly frequency on shared sections of route. Services are operated by a fleet of Alexander Dennis Enviro200 single-deck vehicles, branded in a two-tone pink livery. Features include free WiFi, USB charging and audio-visual next stop announcements.

=== Great Northern Line ===
The Great Northern Line brand operates hourly during a Monday to Saturday daytime between Halifax, Denholme, Cullingworth and Keighley, named after the historic Great Northern Railway railway linking Halifax and Keighley via Denholme and Ovenden. The service is run by 2 Wright Eclipse 2 single-deck vehicles, branded a two-tone pink livery. Features include USB charging and free WiFi.

=== Holmfirth Explorer ===
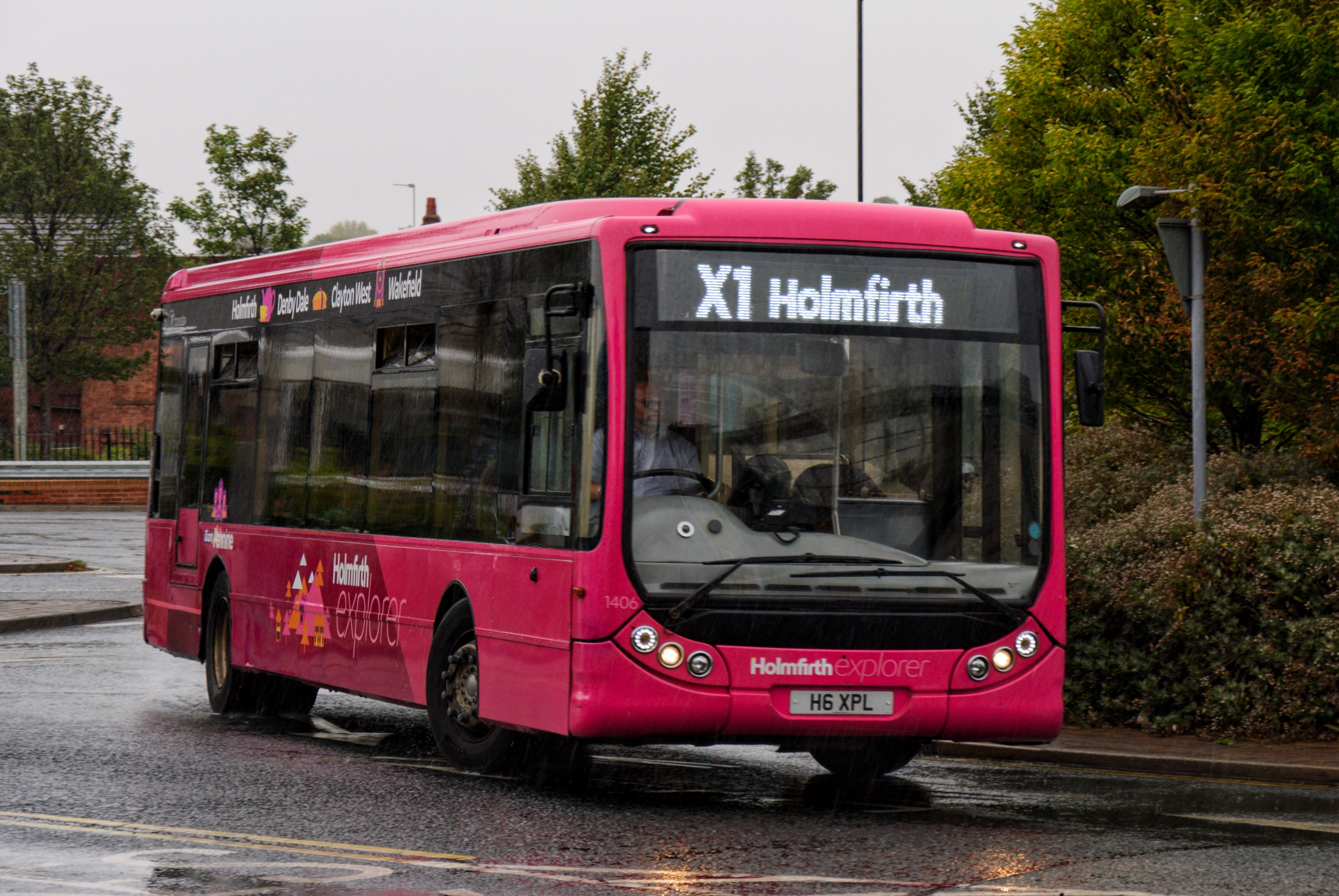
Holmfirth Explorer branded Optare Tempo in Wakefield

The Holmfirth Explorer operates hourly (two-hourly on Sunday) between Holmfirth and Wakefield via Denby Dale. It encompasses five former services into a single "easy to follow" service. The service is operated by a fleet of Optare Tempo single-deck vehicles, branded in a two-tone pink livery. Features include free WiFi, USB charging and audio-visual next stop announcements.

=== HuddsQuick ===
The HuddsQuick brand encompasses a number of local bus services operating in and around the market town of Huddersfield, with destinations including Berry Brow, Brackenhall, Lindley, Lockwood and Huddersfield Royal Infirmary. Services are operated by a fleet of Alexander Dennis Enviro 200 MMC single-deck vehicles, branded in a two-tone pink livery. Features include free WiFi, USB charging and audio-visual next stop announcements.

=== Team Pennine ===
The process of rebranding Yorkshire Tiger to Team Pennine commenced on 25 July 2021 when Team Pennine acquired the Yorkshire Tiger business from Arriva UK Bus. The first vehicle to receive this livery was a long wheel base Alexander Dennis Enviro200. A number of local services are served by this branding such as 20 (Halifax to Pellon), 22 (Halifax to Claremount), 303/4 (Huddersfield to Scapegoat Hill), 343 (Halifax to Huddersfield), 563/563A (Halifax to Brighouse) as well as many more services across Calderdale and Kirklees.

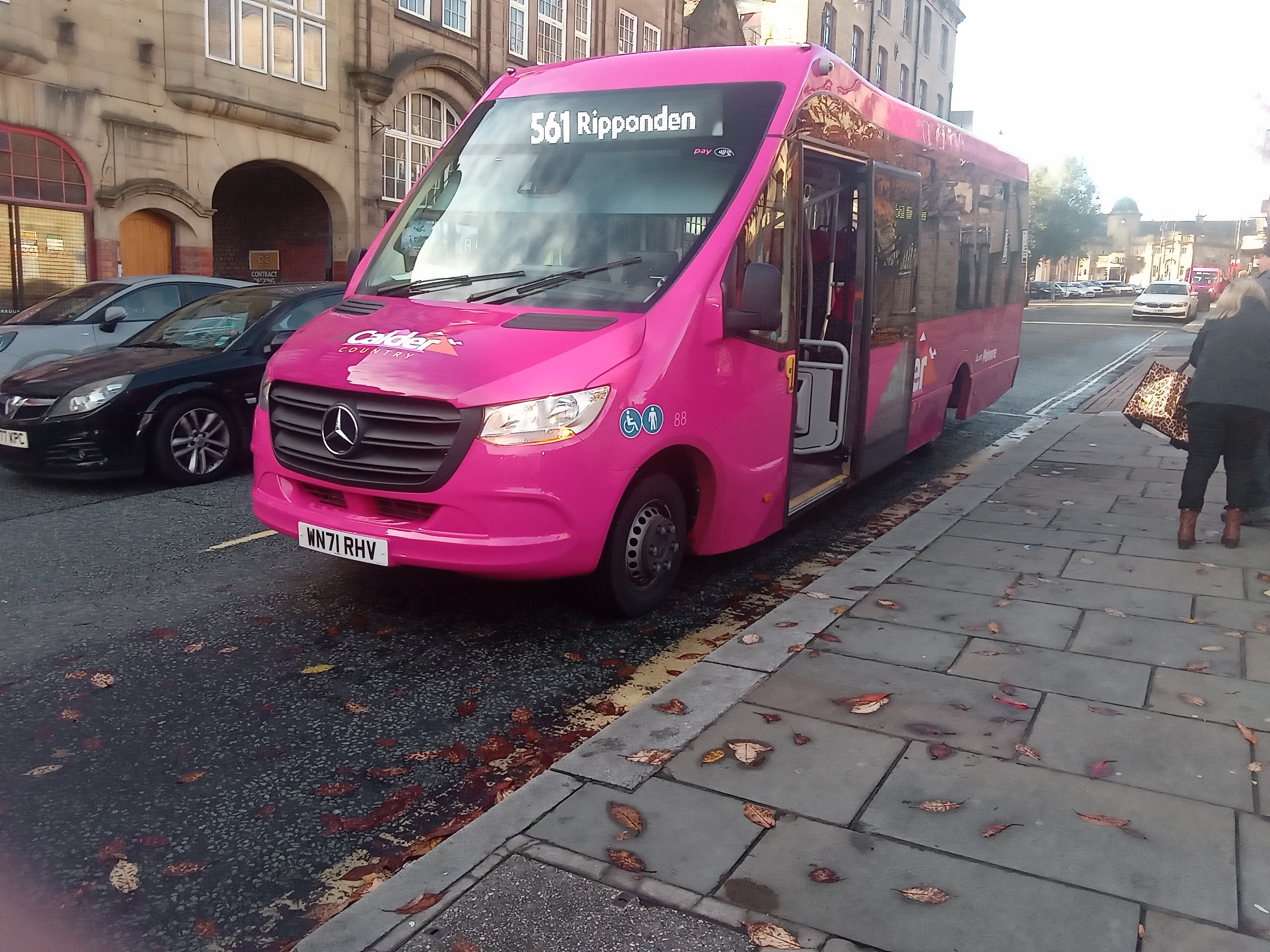
A Team Pennine Mellor Strata at Halifax

== Fleet and operations ==
=== Depots ===
As of April 2022, the company operates from a depot in Elland as well as another in Waterloo on the outskirts of Huddersfield.

=== Vehicles ===
As of August 2023, the fleet consisted of 54 buses. The fleet consists of diesel-powered single and double-deck buses manufactured by Optare, Alexander Dennis, and Wrightbus, as well as minibuses manufactured by Mellor.
