= Leeds Bradford Airport Parkway railway station =

Proposed railway station in England

Coordinates: 53.8577°N 1.6314°W

Leeds/Bradford Airport Parkway station is a proposed railway station near Horsforth, Leeds, in West Yorkshire. It would have around 300 parking spaces serving Leeds Bradford Airport along with adjoining areas including Cookridge, Bramhope and Yeadon and would be situated on the existing Leeds-Harrogate-York route north of the existing Horsforth station. The proposal uses both the existing dedicated airport car park bus services (extended to link the station and the airport terminal at very frequent intervals) and the existing main line railway infrastructure with the new station thus enabling frequent direct access to Leeds, Harrogate, Knaresborough and York along with many other rail journeys using interchange at Leeds or York stations.

The scheme is intended to optimise the use and future development of existing infrastructure and services and is thus efficient of taxpayer funds. The distance of 1-mile (2 km) between the new station and the airport terminal is not uncommon for airport-main line rail connections around the world. Earlier plans, now discounted on grounds of technical feasibility, capital and operating costs, have previously been suggested by various organisations including the Campaign for Better Transport as an alternative to a major new road scheme in the area. Studies have found that a heavy rail service from the Leeds to Harrogate line would face gradients that "exceed the typical maximum gradient that heavy rail can operate over a sustained distance. Even though the gradients involved appeared to be too steep for conventional trains, it was included in a strategic development plan published by the airport for public consultation, where a service by tram-trains had been suggested.

The new proposal being developed since 2016, together with the bus links was initiated by the Harrogate Line Supporters Group. The station is one of four new stations announced in the Governments ‘Connecting People: A Strategic Vision for Rail’ along with Thorpe Park, White Rose and Elland.

| Preceding station | National Rail | Following station |
|---|---|---|
| Horsforth | Northern; Harrogate Line | Weeton |
