= Leeds Bradford Airport =

Airport in West Yorkshire, England

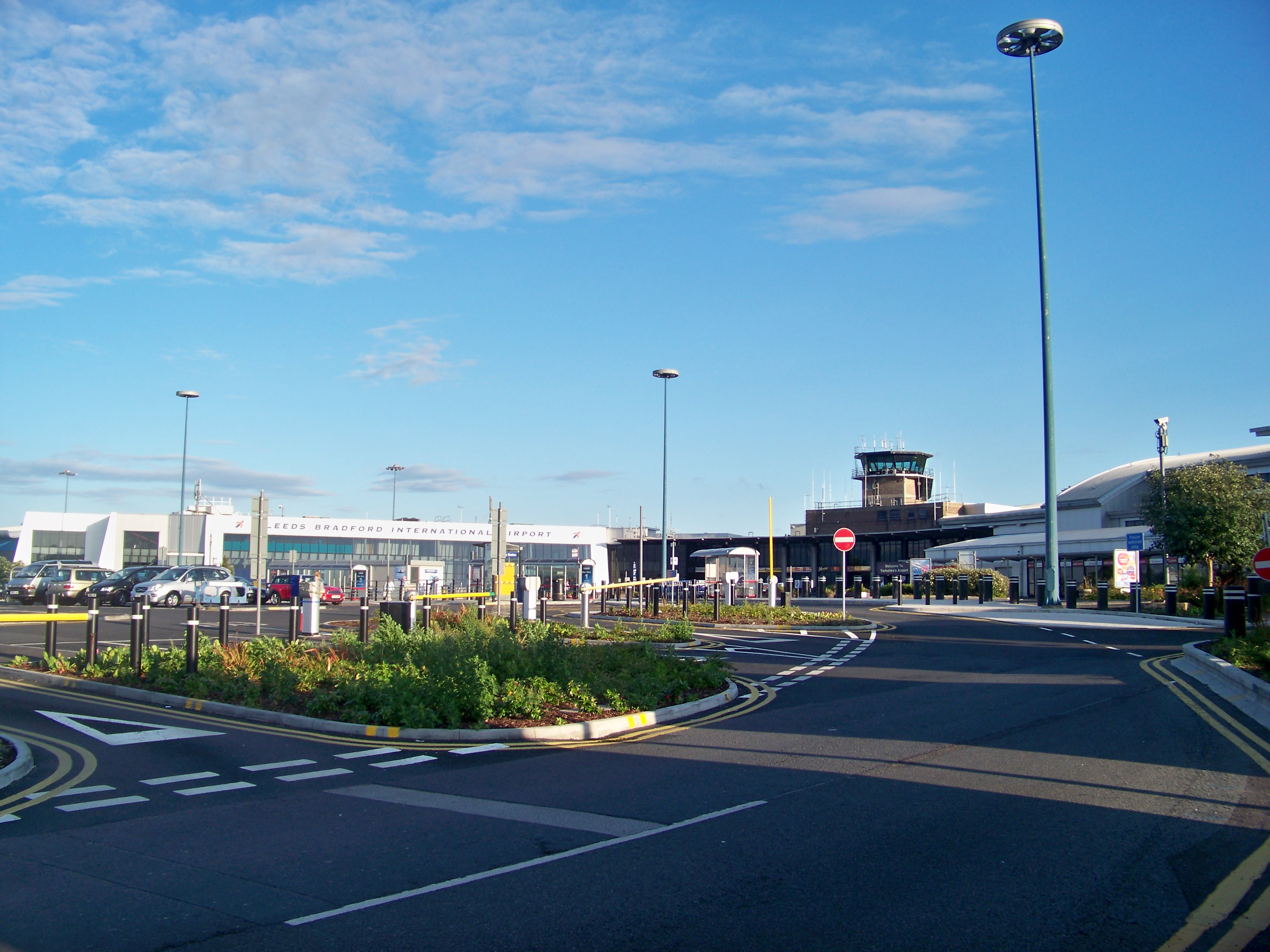
- IATA: LBA; ICAO: EGNM

Summary
- Airport type: Public
- Owner: AENA 51% InfraBridge 49%
- Operator: Leeds Bradford Airport Limited
- Serves: Leeds; Bradford
- Location: Yeadon, West Yorkshire, England, UK
- Opened: 17 October 1931; 95 years ago
- Operating base for: Jet2.com; Ryanair
- Elevation AMSL: 681 ft (208 m)
- Coordinates: 53°51′58″N 001°39′39″W
- Website: www.leedsbradfordairport.co.uk

Map
- Location in West Yorkshire LBA/EGNM (the United Kingdom)

Runways
Direction	Length		Surface
Direction	m	ft	Surface
14/32	2,250	7,382	Concrete

Statistics (2024)
- Passengers: 4,222,487
- Passenger change 23–24: ▲5.8%
- Aircraft Movements: 37,093
- Movements change 23–24: ▲1.9%
- Sources: UK AIP at NATS; UK CAA Airport Data 2024

Leeds Bradford Airport (IATA: LBA, ICAO: EGNM) is located in Yeadon, West Yorkshire, England, about 7 miles (11 km) northwest of Leeds city centre, and about 9 miles (14 km) northeast from Bradford city centre. It serves Leeds and Bradford and the wider Yorkshire region including York, Wakefield and Harrogate, and is the largest airport in Yorkshire. The airport was in public ownership until May 2007, when it was bought by Bridgepoint Capital for £145.5 million. Bridgepoint sold it in 2017 to AMP Capital. In December 2025, Spanish national airport company AENA acquired a majority stake in the airport.

Leeds Bradford opened on 17 October 1931 when it was known as Leeds and Bradford Municipal Aerodrome or Yeadon Aerodrome; some locals still refer to it as Yeadon Airport. Largely used for general aviation and training purposes early on, the first scheduled flights commenced on 8 April 1935. To accommodate passenger traffic, work commenced on the first terminal in the late 1930s, although only the first wing was completed before the Second World War.

British aircraft manufacturer Avro constructed a shadow factory called the Leeds Bradford Airport Depot to the north of the airport, which was the largest free-standing structure in Europe at that time. Avro produced around 5,515 aircraft before it closed in December 1946 and civil flights recommenced the following year. It is located where Leeds Bradford Airport Industrial Estate is today.

In 1965, a new runway opened. After Yeadon's terminal was destroyed in a fire, a replacement was completed in 1968. In the early 1980s, runway extensions were completed that enabled it to be classified as a regional airport. On 4 November 1984, the day a runway extension was opened, Wardair commenced transatlantic flights to Toronto, using Boeing 747s. On 2 August 1986, an Air France Concorde charter flight from Paris landed for the first time, drawing an estimated crowd of 70,000 people. More Concorde charter flights took place until 2000. In 1994, the airport's operational hour restrictions were removed, enabling flights at any time of day. Since 1996, the terminal has been expanded in the terms of size and facilities. In 2007, nearly 2.9 million passengers passed through the airport, an 88% increase in seven years and more than twice as many compared with 1997 (1.2 million).

Leeds Bradford has a CAA Public Use Aerodrome Licence (Number P800) that allows flights for passenger transport and flight training. The airport operates scheduled flights to many European destinations and a limited number of domestic destinations. It is the highest airport in England at an elevation of 681 ft (208 m). By the number of passengers handled in 2024, Leeds Bradford was the 13th busiest airport in the UK. It is a base for Jet2.com, which has its headquarters at the airport.

== History ==
=== Opening and early operations ===
What became Leeds Bradford Airport was built in the late 1920s and early 1930s on 60 acres (24 ha) of grassland next to the old Bradford to Harrogate road. On 17 October 1931, the airport, which was interchangeably known as Leeds and Bradford Municipal Aerodrome or Yeadon Aerodrome in its early years, was officially opened. Initially, the airport was operated by the Yorkshire Aeroplane Club on behalf of Leeds and Bradford Corporations. Its early operations were typified by training and general aviation flights.

In 1935, the aerodrome was expanded by 35 acres (140,000 m^{2}); the first scheduled flights commenced on 8 April 1935 with a service by North Eastern Airways from London (Heston Aerodrome) to Newcastle upon Tyne (Cramlington). The service was extended to Edinburgh (Turnhouse). In June 1935, Blackpool and West Coast Air Services launched a service to the Isle of Man. By 1936, the London/Yeadon/Newcastle/Edinburgh service was flying three times a week and also stopped at Doncaster and continued to Aberdeen (Dyce).

Seasonal flights between Yeadon and Liverpool commenced during the 1930s. To accommodate the expanding passenger numbers, work commenced on a terminal building but progress was halted after a single wing had been completed. During this time, the German zeppelin LZ 129 Hindenburg overflew the aerodrome and while the flight was claimed to be for publicity purposes, it was later found to have been engaged in espionage.

=== RAF Yeadon ===
609 (West Riding) Squadron AAF was based at Yeadon from its formation on 10 February 1936, until 27 August 1939 when it was relocated to Catterick. In 1946, 609 Squadron was reformed and returned to Yeadon the following year. The squadron was equipped with de Havilland Mosquito MK.XXX aircraft which were difficult to operate because the runways were too short. Safety speed (at which the aircraft needs to be flown and controlled on a single engine) was not reached until over flying central Leeds when taking off in that direction—with drastic results should things go wrong. The airfield sloped downhill and it was necessary to land at RAF Linton-on-Ouse, 20 miles (32 km) away, if the wind was coming from the wrong direction. Eventually, the Air Ministry re-equipped 609 with Spitfire LFXVIs. This was sufficient as a short-term measure, but the grass airstrip was not ideally suited to Spitfire operations, and it was decided that 609 Squadron should move to the hard runways of RAF Church Fenton in October 1950.

Yeadon was requisitioned by the Royal Air Force and became part of 13 Group and subsequently 12 Group. Once 609 (West Riding) Squadron left for Catterick, Yeadon served as a Flying Training School, bomber maintenance unit, and a scatter airfield. In January 1942, it was transferred to the Ministry of Aircraft Production and Avro built a shadow factory for the production of Albermarle, Anson, Lancaster, York, and Lincoln aircraft. It was also used by Hawker Aircraft for development work on its Tornado design. The Royal Air Force remained a part of Yeadon's life until 1957, operating Austers, Supermarine Spitfires, de Havilland Mosquitoes out of here. RAF Yeadon finally closed in 1959.

=== Wartime use ===
At the outbreak of the Second World War in 1939, all civil aviation operations were halted. The aircraft manufacturer Avro constructed a shadow factory to the north of the aerodrome to manufacture military aircraft. The factory was connected to the aerodrome by a taxiway from where the aircraft made their way to make their maiden flights. The Avro factory was camouflaged, its roof disguised as a field with dummy cattle and agricultural buildings so that from the air it resembled the surrounding fields. Large numbers of houses were constructed nearby to house the workforce. The factory, which commenced production in 1941, was reportedly the largest free-standing structure in Europe at the time.

To better accommodate the large military aircraft, improvements were made to the aerodrome including two runways, more taxiways and extra hangarage enabling Yeadon to become an important site for military test flying. About 5,515 aircraft were produced at Yeadon of the following main types: Anson (more than 4,500), Bristol Blenheim (250), Lancaster bomber (695), York (45) and the Lincoln (25). Decreased demand at the end of the conflict saw the factory closed in December 1946. On New Year's Day 1947, the site was handed over to the Ministry of Civil Aviation. Many of the airport's original hangars remain intact.

=== 1947 to 1969 ===
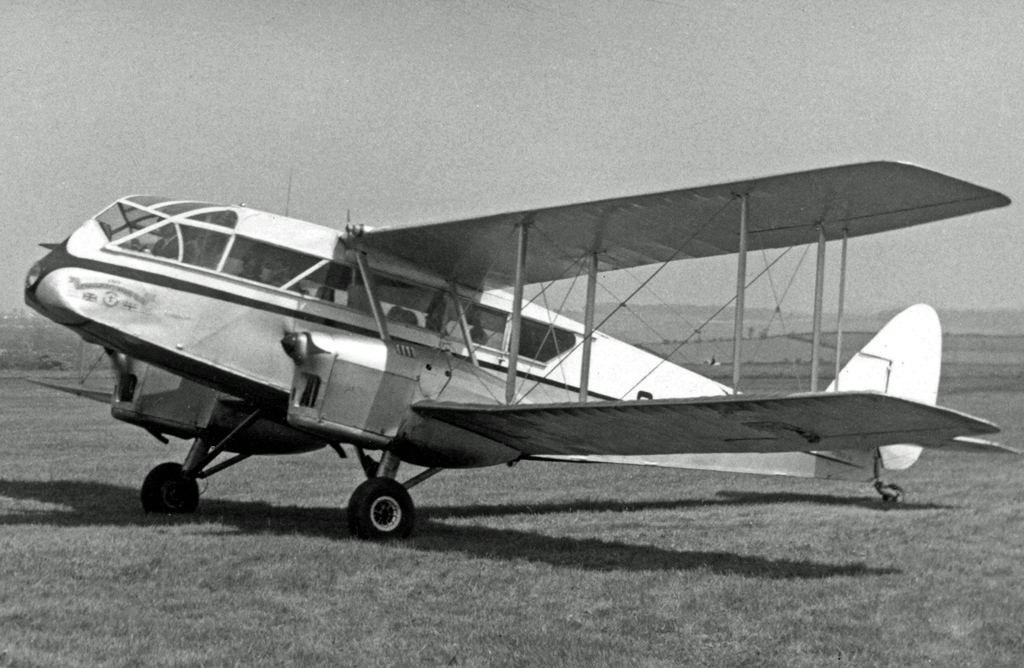
A de Havilland Dragon of Air Navigation & Training at Yeadon Airport, May 1956

In 1947, civil flights recommenced. Local resident Geoff Rennard who had campaigned for Leeds and Bradford to have an aerodrome established an Aero Club. He was subsequently appointed airport manager, remaining for five years. In 1953, Yeadon Aviation Ltd was formed to manage and operate the airport and its Aero Club. In 1955, services to Belfast, Jersey, Ostend, Southend, the Isle of Wight and Düsseldorf were added to Yeadon's destination list. Scheduled flights to London commenced in 1960; a route to Dublin by Aer Lingus was added shortly after. In 1965, a new runway was opened and in the same year the terminal building was accidentally destroyed in a fire. Its replacement was started shortly after and was operational by 1968.

=== 1970 to 1994 ===
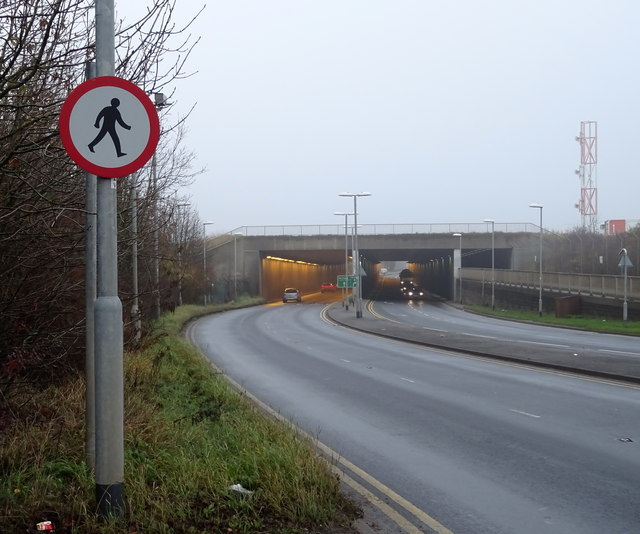
In the 1980s, Leeds Bradford International Airport extended its runway to take bigger planes by building an overpass over the A658 road.

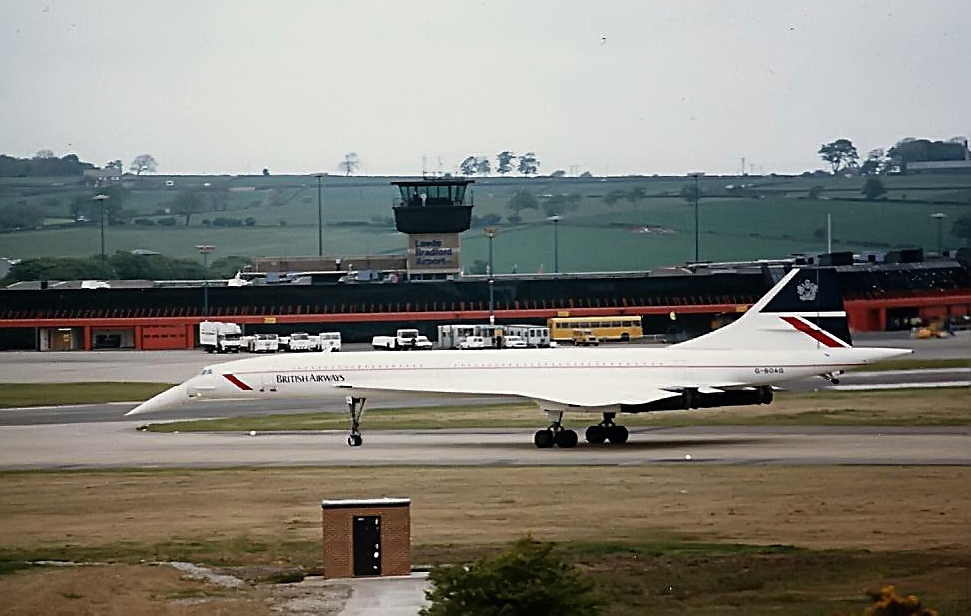
A British Airways Concorde taxis at the airport, 1987

By the mid-1970s, the package holiday had become popular in the British Isles. During 1976, the first holiday charter flight to the Iberian Peninsula by Britannia Airways departed from Leeds Bradford.

In 1978, it was recognised that, if the runway was extended, the airport could be upgraded to regional airport status. In 1982, construction commenced on the main runway necessitating the construction of a tunnel to take the A658 Bradford to Harrogate road beneath the runway. On 4 November 1984, the runway was completed. Around this time, the airport's terminal building was extended and redeveloped. The first phase opened on 18 July 1985.

On 4 November 1984, the day the runway extension was officially opened, Wardair commenced transatlantic flights to Toronto, using Boeing 747s but these flights were discontinued in 1989 when Wardair ceased operations. Worldways Canada, Odyssey International, Air Transat, Nationair and Caledonian all operated transatlantic services from the airport well into the 1990s using Lockheed Tristar and Boeing 757–200 airliners.

On 2 August 1986, an Air France Concorde charter flight from Paris landed at the airport for the first time; an estimated 70,000 people were drawn to the airport to catch a glimpse of the supersonic airliner. Occasional Concorde charter flights using British Airways aircraft continued until June 2000, just one month before the Concorde disaster in Paris.

Leeds Bradford Airport had restricted operating hours that proved to be a deterrent to many charter airlines, whose cheap fares were heavily dependent on 'round-the-clock' use of their aircraft. In 1994, the restrictions were removed, enabling planes to use the airport 24 hours per day, attracting more business.

=== 1995 to 2019 ===
Work on the airport terminal has been ongoing since 1996, and the result of this has been significant growth in terminal size and passenger facilities. The expanded terminal, along with new hangars, has accommodated the expanding use of airliners such as the Boeing 737.

On 6 October 2005, the original runway, 09/27, was permanently closed; it has since been redeveloped as a taxiway and to provide additional apron space.

In February 2008, Shaheen Air commenced a link to Islamabad. Leeds Bradford's first scheduled flight to Asia, the service catered to the Pakistani community in Yorkshire. Shaheen flew to Islamabad with an Airbus A310 that it had leased from a Turkish company. In order to comply with Pakistani government regulations, it needed to switch to a plane registered in Pakistan within three months. However, the airline was unable to obtain such an aircraft in time, so it had to end the route in May 2008. Pakistan International Airlines (PIA) launched a flight to the same city two months later. It also used an A310 on the route.

Between 2000 and 2013, the airport was home to the West/South air platform of the Yorkshire Air Ambulance. It moved to Nostell in November 2013. The following May, PIA terminated its Islamabad service due to financial losses. The A310s consumed fuel inefficiently, and the carrier did not possess enough fuel-efficient aircraft to replace them.

=== 2020 to present ===
In 2020, the COVID-19 pandemic necessitated the construction of a temporary extension to the terminal front, titled the 'Preparation Zone', acting as a space to queue, maintain Social distancing measures, and to ensure all passengers were wearing face masks as per the UK Government's COVID-19 strategy. The existing 'Yorkshire Lounge' was converted into a takeaway food outlet called 'Flight Bites', and all travel money kiosks, other shops / food outlets and the 'Fast Track' security lane were closed. On 15 July 2020, a new, refurbished Yorkshire Lounge opened; closing the Flight Bites temporary outlet. On the same day, Starbucks and Boots outlets reopened; coinciding with the relaunch of Jet2.com flights.

The effects of the COVID-19 pandemic caused significant problems in the airport with staff shortages resulting in huge queues for check-in and security, as a result of the airport getting back up to pre-pandemic levels of passenger numbers, leading to it being ranked worst in the UK. This later led to threats of strike action in security over better pay, which were later suspended.

With the closure of Doncaster Sheffield Airport in November 2022, the majority of Wizz Air and TUI's flights were transferred to Leeds Bradford, bringing new routes to destinations in Romania and Poland, as well as bringing more passengers in from further afield.

In August 2024, the airport announced as part of its 2030 vision, plans to reintroduce long haul flights from the airport, stating that this could happen within the next 3 years. They also expect passenger numbers to go from 4 million to 7 million a year by 2030.

In August 2026, low cost carrier EasyJet announced it would cease services to the airport "after the 5th of January".

== Facilities ==
The airport has a terminal and two air bridges. The terminal has two check-in halls: Hall A is used by all airlines except Jet2 and Hall B is solely used by Jet2. Upstairs is a retail space with shops, restaurants, bars and a duty-free shopping area. Long, medium and short-stay car parks provide 7,000 parking spaces at the airport, along with several drop off points.

The airport processes a small amount of freight from its two cargo sheds on site with a view to expanding this operation, a key focus of the business and master-plan objectives. The airport features a single runway of 2,200 m (7,200 ft) aligned as 14 and 32. Until 2005, there was a second shorter runway aligned 09 and 27, however it was closed in October 2005 and converted into a taxiway.

== Development ==
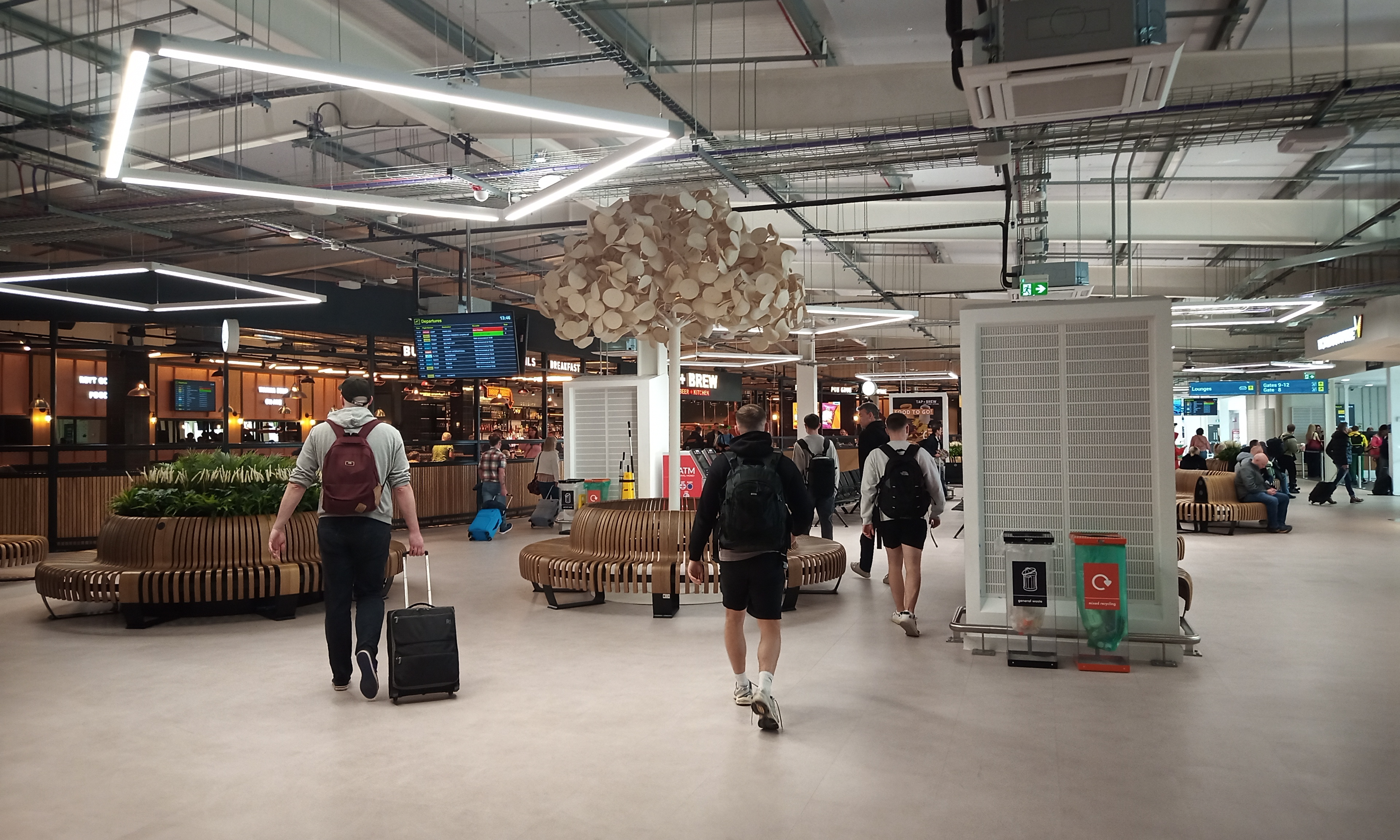
Interior of the extension to departures in 2026

Leeds Bradford Airport published a masterplan in March 2017 outlining development needs at the airport through 2030. Planning permission was granted in January 2019 to renovate and expand the terminal to create additional departure gate access, extended seating areas, improved baggage reclaim facilities and enlarged immigration and customs facilities. Leeds City Council and the West Yorkshire Combined Authority (WYCA) also consulted in 2019 on the delivery of a new link road and parkway rail station which could provide a ten-minute connection to Leeds railway station. The link road was dropped, with plans for Leeds Bradford Airport Parkway railway station taken for further development.

However, AMP Capital stated that updating the old 1965 original terminal would neither improve facilities sufficiently nor be able to offer a carbon neutral facility for the future. A planning application for a new terminal was submitted in early 2020 with permission granted by Leeds City Council in February 2021, alongside a rise in annual passenger numbers from four to seven million. Local MPs, environmental action groups and local residents criticised the scheme on environmental grounds, while supporters emphasised the benefits it would bring to the local economy. Following these objections, the decision to expand the airport was referred to the government, which placed a temporary block on construction while it examined the decision further. By March 2022, citing "excessive delays", the proposal for a new terminal was withdrawn and efforts were again placed into implementing the 2019 expansion plans.

In October 2023, the airport announced the 'LBA:REGEN' regeneration scheme, committing over £100 million to improve accessibility, expanded retail and dining facilities and a more streamlined arrivals experience, alongside improvements which will allow the airport to meet their net-zero 2030 goal. Construction on this scheme began in autumn 2023 and is expected to be completed by late 2025 / early 2026.

== Ownership ==
Leeds and Bradford councils jointly bought the airport site in 1930 and it opened as Yeadon Aerodrome in 1931. The airport became a limited company in 1987, and was shared between the five boroughs, Leeds (40%), Bradford (40%) and Wakefield, Calderdale and Kirklees (sharing the remaining 20%).

In October 2006, plans to privatise the airport were confirmed and on 4 April 2007, the five controlling councils announced that Bridgepoint Capital had been selected as the preferred bidder. On 4 May 2007, Bridgepoint Capital acquired the airport from Leeds, Bradford, Wakefield, Calderdale and Kirklees councils for £145.5 million. Although Bridgepoint Capital owned the airport 100% financially, the councils hold a "special share" in the airport, to protect its name and continued operation as an air transport gateway for the Yorkshire region. In November 2017, Bridgepoint Capital sold the airport to AMP Capital who own several other airports around the world. AMP announced plans to expand the airport, improve the customer experience and secure more business flights.

In December 2025, InfraBridge, formerly known as AMP Capital, agreed terms to sell a 51% stake in the airport to AENA. Pending regulatory approval being granted, the transaction is scheduled to be completed in the second quarter of 2026.

== Airlines and destinations ==
The following airlines operate regular scheduled flights to and from Leeds Bradford:

Airlines	Destinations
Aer Lingus	Belfast–City, Dublin
easyJet	Barcelona, Belfast–International, Paris–Charles de Gaulle (all end 5 January 2027); Seasonal: Geneva, Málaga, Palma de Mallorca (all end 5 January 2027)
Jet2.com	Agadir, Alicante, Antalya, Barcelona, Budapest, Faro, Fuerteventura, Funchal, Gran Canaria, Hurghada (begins 14 February 2027), Kraków, Lanzarote, Málaga, Malta, Paris–Charles de Gaulle, Sharm El Sheikh (begins 13 February 2027), Tenerife–South; Seasonal: Almería, Bergerac, Berlin, Bodrum, Burgas, Catania, Chambéry, Chania, Copenhagen, Corfu, Dalaman, Dubrovnik, Enfidha (begins 1 May 2027), Geneva, Girona, Heraklion, Ibiza, Izmir, Jerez de la Frontera, Jersey, Kefalonia, Kos, Larnaca, Marrakesh, Menorca, Naples, Nice, Palma de Mallorca, Paphos, Pisa, Prague, Preveza/Lefkada (begins 23 May 2027), Reus, Rhodes, Salzburg, Santorini (begins 6 May 2027), Skiathos, Split, Tallinn (begins 27 November 2026), Thessaloniki, Tivat (begins 10 May 2027), Verona, Zakynthos
KLM	Amsterdam
Ryanair	Agadir, Alicante, Bucharest–Otopeni, Dublin, Faro, Fuerteventura, Gdańsk, Kraków, Lanzarote, Málaga, Porto, Poznań, Riga, Tenerife–South, Warsaw–Chopin, Wrocław; Seasonal: Bratislava, Chania, Girona, Ibiza, Limoges, Palma de Mallorca, Perpignan, Reus, Zadar
SunExpress	Seasonal: Antalya (suspended)
TUI Airways	Seasonal: Corfu, Dubrovnik, Palma de Mallorca
Wizz Air	Bucharest–Otopeni, Cluj-Napoca, Warsaw–Chopin

== Statistics ==
=== Passengers and movements ===
	Passengers (Note: The number of domestic and international passengers)	Aircraft movements (Note: The number of total air transport takeoffs and landings)
1997	1,254,853	26,123
1998	1,406,948	25,615
1999	1,462,497	26,185
2000	1,585,039	29,263
2001	1,530,227	28,397
2002	1,530,019	28,566
2003	2,017,649	29,397
2004	2,368,604	31,493
2005	2,609,638	35,949
2006	2,792,686	37,251
2007	2,881,539	39,603
2008	2,873,321	37,604
2009	2,574,426	32,531
2010	2,755,110	33,911
2011	2,976,881	33,069
2012	2,990,517	30,223
2013	3,318,358	31,057
2014	3,274,474	30,663
2015	3,445,302	31,149
2016	3,612,117	32,196
2017	4,078,069	34,549
2018	4,038,889	38,680
2019	3,992,862	35,641
2020	751,091	12,312
2021	739,131	8,480
2022	3,288,635	25,943
2023	3,989,405	29,281
2024	4,222,487	31,035
^{Source: UK Civil Aviation Authority}

Leeds Bradford Airport Passenger Totals, 1997–2023 (millions)

=== Routes ===
Busiest routes to and from Leeds Bradford (2025)
Rank	Destination	Total passengers	Change 2024/25
1	Alicante	388,425	▲2.8%
2	Dublin	383,035	▲7.2%
3	Palma de Mallorca	314,540	▲13.2%
4	Málaga	288,155	▲12.0%
5	Tenerife–South	221,744	▼3.2%
6	Faro	187,231	▲11.5%
7	Amsterdam	173,301	▲3.1%
8	Lanzarote	155,941	▼5.1%
9	Kraków	141,361	▲6.0%
10	Belfast–City	130,756	▲4.0%

== Ground transport ==
Bus services to and from the airport are currently operated by Transdev Blazefield under the Flyer brand. The network currently consists of three routes:

- A1 to Rawdon, Horsforth, Hawksworth, Kirkstall and Leeds.
- A2 to Pool, Pannal and Harrogate to the North, and Yeadon, Rawdon, Apperley Bridge, Greengates, and Bradford to the South.
- A3 to Pool and Otley to the North, and Yeadon, Guiseley, Shipley and Bradford to the South.

Services were previously operated by Yorkshire Tiger, branded as 'Flying Tiger'. The tender was given to Transdev Blazefield in August 2020 due to Covid resulting in the routes no longer being commercially viable for Yorkshire Tiger.

Bus services to the cities of Leeds and Bradford link the airport with the National Rail network via Leeds railway station, Bradford Interchange and Bradford Forster Square and connects with long-distance coach services at Leeds City bus station and Bradford Interchange.

== Flight training and general aviation ==
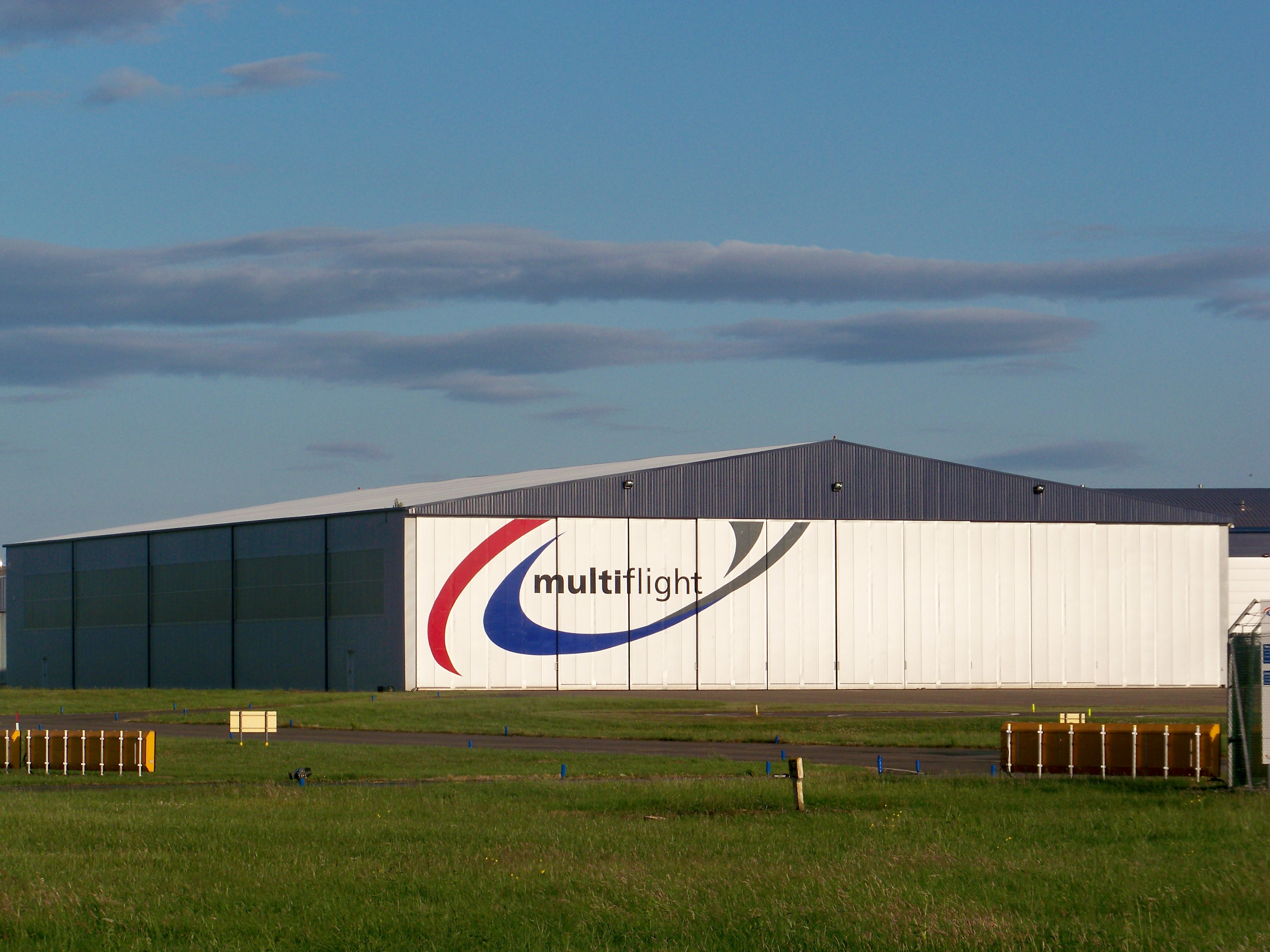
Multiflight aircraft hangar

Since 1994, the airport has been home to Multiflight, a flight training and aircraft engineering organisation. They are also the dedicated FBO at the airfield and provide helicopter and fixed wing charter flights as well as aircraft sales and management. General aviation operations are confined to the south-side of the airport, in order to maintain separation from commercial traffic utilising the main terminal.

During 2005, a pair of new hangars capable of housing up to four Boeing 737-800 were constructed, as well as a new apron and direct taxiway to the runway. A dedicated southside fuel farm was also installed.

The Aviation Academy is located within a hangar at Leeds Bradford Airport. It is operated by Craven College in conjunction with the Open University. The academy trains and prepares students to work within the commercial aviation industry.

Hields Aviation has operated from Leeds Bradford Airport since 2019, offering both fixed wing and helicopter training from the Flight Training Centre, based opposite the Multiflight west hangar.

== Incidents and accidents ==
Prior to 1985, there were two recorded incidents of runway overruns at Leeds Bradford Airport, both involving British Midland Airways Viscount aircraft, and both showing evidence of hydroplaning.

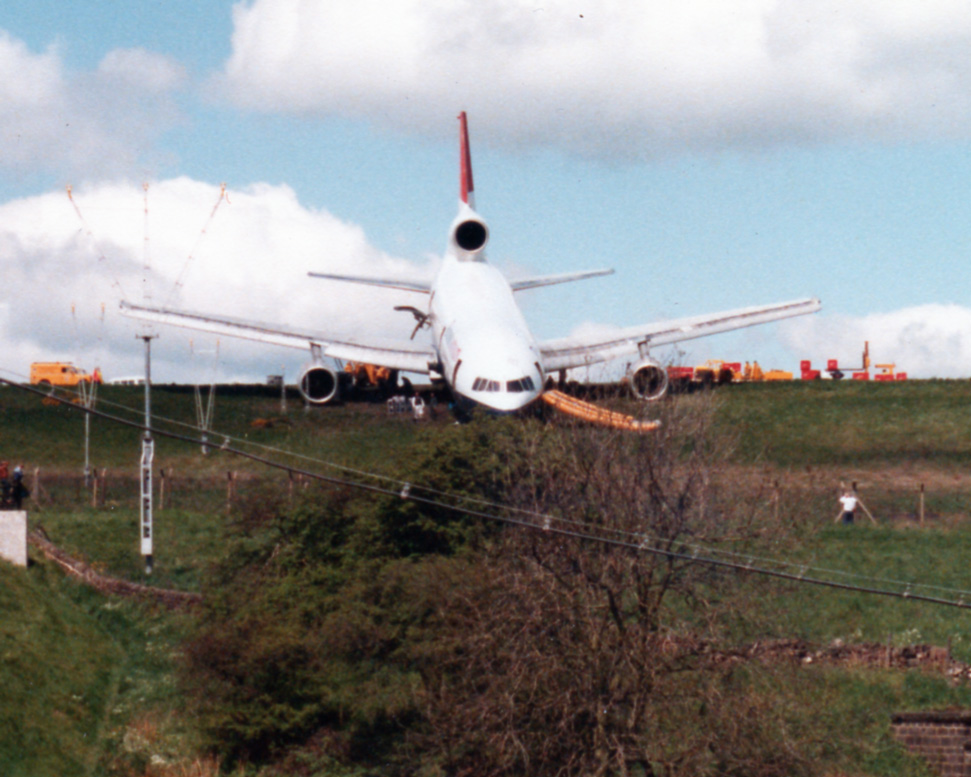
British Airtours Lockheed Tristar at end of runway 14, 1985

- On 27 May 1985, a Lockheed Tristar operated by British Airtours, registration G-BBAI, on British Airtours Flight 101 overran the runway surface on landing from Palma after a rain shower. The aircraft was evacuated, with only minor injuries sustained by the 14 crew and 398 passengers. The nose landing gear strut folded backwards during the overrun, leading to severe damage to the underside of the forward fuselage. The undersides of both wing-mounted engines were flattened and both engines suffered ingestion damage. The main wheels of the aircraft also dug deep troughs in the area beyond the end of the runway, damaging the buried airfield lighting cables. The accident report concluded that the overrun was caused by the inability of the aircraft to achieve the appropriate level of braking effectiveness and recommended that both the scheduled wet runway performance of the TriStar and the condition of the surface of runway 14 at Leeds Bradford Airport should be re-examined.
- On 24 May 1995, an Embraer EMB 110 Bandeirante aircraft, registration G-OEAA operated by Knight Air on a flight between Leeds Bradford and Aberdeen (see Knight Air Flight 816), entered a steeply descending spiral dive, broke up in flight and crashed into farmland at Dunkeswick Moor near Leeds. All 12 occupants were killed. The probable cause of the accident was the failure of one or both artificial horizon instruments. There was no standby artificial horizon installed (as there was no airworthiness requirement for one on this aircraft) and the accident report concluded that this left the crew without a single instrument available for assured attitude reference or simple means of determining which flight instruments had failed. The aircraft entered a spiral dive from which the pilot, who was likely to have become spatially disoriented, was unable to recover.
- On 18 May 2005, a Jordanian Airbus A320, registration JY-JAR operating for Spanish charter airline LTE suffered a braking malfunction on landing at Leeds Bradford Airport following a flight from Fuerteventura. The aircraft touched down on runway 14 just beyond the touchdown zone, approximately 400 m (1,300 ft) beyond the aiming point. The pilots determined that the rate of deceleration was inadequate and applied full reverse thrust and full manual braking in an effort to stop the aircraft. However, the normal braking system malfunctioned and the Captain turned the aircraft onto a level grassed area to the right of the runway where it came to rest. There were no injuries to the passengers or crew. However, the Air Accidents Investigation Branch made seven safety recommendations in the final accident report.

== Criticism ==
In 2022, it was found that Leeds Bradford Airport had exceeded the number of nightly flights allowance of 2,800 during BST (British Summer Time) by 747, between March and October. Following on from this in 2023, it was rumoured that there had been an application for unlimited night flights. The airport denied this saying they wanted exceptions for quieter aircraft and emergency flights. However, protesters have said that this could easily lead to unlimited night flights.

During summer of 2022, when the rush for summer getaways started after Covid, LBA was one of the worst for security queues, due to a combination of lack of staff and flights going back to pre pandemic levels. This caused passengers to be queuing out of the terminal in the early hours of the morning and having to be pulled out of the queue in order to make it in time for flights. Within all the mayhem, passengers turned up for flights several hours earlier than needed causing more chaos.

In December 2022, it was found that Leeds Bradford Airport had been providing unacceptable service to disabled passengers with unduly delays throughout their airport journey. These findings were published in CAA latest reports. The airport has since spent £500,000 on new airport wheelchairs.

As of November 2024, GALBA (Group for Action on Leeds Bradford Airport) claims that Leeds Bradford Airport has failed to limit the number of night flights during the summer season for the third consecutive year.

== See also ==
- Transport in Leeds
