= BrassNeck Theatre =

Organization

- BrassNeck Theatre Logo
- Formation: January 2010
- Type: Theatre group

BrassNeck Theatre is a theatre company based in Leeds, West Yorkshire, England. It was formed by the merger of The Grove & Rawdon Theatre Company and Stampede Theatre Company in January 2010.

BrassNeck Theatre's first production was Footloose the Musical, performed at Yeadon Town Hall in May 2010. The majority of the company's productions, and rehearsals, take place at Yeadon Town Hall and Guiseley Theatre.

== Reputation ==
BrassNeck Theatre's reputation was formed in its two founding theatre companies. The Grove and Rawdon Theatre Company and Stampede Theatre Company were both well known for producing professional standard theatre, with local reviewers often comparing the standard to that of London's West End.

In recent years, BrassNeck Theatre has built on this reputation by successfully staging a wide range of plays and musical theatre, all receiving positive reviews. Reviewers often comment not only on the high quality of their acting, singing and dancing, but also on technical expertise with custom built sets and a very high standard of lighting and sound.

== Future shows ==
BrassNeck Theatre's next show will be Ghost, with the performance due May 2024 at Yeadon Town Hall.

== Previous shows ==
- 2010: Footloose the Musical, Our House
- 2011: The Producers, Bouncers & Shakers, RENT
- 2012: The Full Monty, Calendar Girls, Fiddler on the Roof
- 2013: Whistle Down the Wind, Avenue Q
- 2014: The Wedding Singer, Little Women
- 2015: The 25th Annual Putnam County Spelling Bee, The Addams Family
- 2016: The 39 Steps, Spamalot
- 2017: Rock of Ages
- 2018: Into the Woods
- 2019: Sunset Boulevard
- 2022: Calendar Girls
- 2023: Sunshine on Leith

== History ==
=== The Grove and Rawdon Theatre Company ===
The Grove and Rawdon Theatre Company were formed in 2002 by the merger of Horsforth Grove Amateur Operatics Society and Rawdon Amateur Operatics Society.

From 2002 to 2009, The Grove and Rawdon Theatre Company staged 16 productions, and became renowned for producing difficult musicals to a high standard. Their shows, including Jesus Christ Superstar, Seussical the Musical, Buddy! and Wizard of Oz, frequently received rave reviews in local papers.

They also gained a reputation for their willingness to tackle new and challenging musicals, such as Bat Boy, Spend Spend Spend and Jekyll and Hyde.

The Grove and Rawdon Theatre Company Productions

- 2002: The Music Man, Swing, Sing and Tango (Cabaret style show)
- 2003: South Pacific, Chicago Nights (Cabaret style show)
- 2004: My Fair Lady, Return to the Forbidden Planet
- 2005: Jesus Christ Superstar, Seussical the Musical
- 2006: Spend Spend Spend, Buddy!
- 2007: Carousel, Bat Boy
- 2008: Jekyll & Hyde, Boogie Nights
- 2009: Wizard of Oz, A Funny Thing Happened on the Way to the Forum

=== Stampede Theatre Company ===
Stampede Theatre Company was founded in 2006, "in response to a growing need for a 'youth based' theatre company in the Wharfedale area".

The theatre company produced 9 musical shows and became well known in the local area for their quality productions, in particular the high standard of their youth members. Like The Grove and Rawdon Theatre Company, their productions earned rave reviews in local news, including their productions of the schools version of Les Miserables, We Will Rock You, and West Side Story.

Stampede Theatre Company maintained that while they had an emphasis on youth, they were not only a youth company, and staged a number of successful productions with an "adult" cast, including The Full Monty and Sweeney Todd.

Stampede Theatre Company Productions

- 2006: Les Miserables (Schools Version), Cabaret 2006 (Cabaret style show), Annie
- 2007: Little Shop of Horrors, We Will Rock You
- 2008: The Full Monty, Back to the 80's
- 2009: Sweeney Todd, West Side Story

== Notable members ==
Both companies involved in the BrassNeck Theatre were known for having a high standard of membership. Previous and current members have studied at leading drama schools such as GSA Conservatoire and Mountview Academy of Theatre Arts. Past and present notable members of the theatre include:

- Christian Cooke – performed with Horsforth Grove Amateur Operatics Society in their youth production of Bugsy Malone. Cooke is now a professional actor, appearing in Demons and the 2010 film Cemetery Junction.
- Verity Rushworth – performed with Horsforth Grove Amateur Operatics Society in their youth production of Bugsy Malone. After making her name on Emmerdale as Donna Windsor-Dingle, Rushworth performed in the London production of the hit musical Hairspray as Penny Pingleton before moving to take over the role of Maria in the UK tour of The Sound of Music.
- Peter Grant – performed with Rawdon Amateur Operatics Society in their production of Oliver. Grant is now a professional singer.
- Darcy Isa – performed with Stampede Theatre Company in their production of Back to the 80's. Isa is a professional actress, playing Lauren Andrews in the TV series Waterloo Road.
- Megan Parkinson – performed with BrassNeck Theatre in their production of Little Women and appeared in Game of Thrones, Season 7.
- Luke Bayer – performed with BrassNeck Theatre most notably in their production of RENT as Angel, as well as both founding companies. Luke appeared as alternate for Jamie in the West End production of Everybody's Talking About Jamie, winning the award for Best Performance By An Understudy/Alternate in Any Play or Musical at the 2018 BroadwayWorld UK Awards.
- Bradley Judge – performed in a number of productions with the BrassNeck Theatre founding companies, most notably with Stampede Theatre Company in their production of The Full Monty. Bradley is part of the 2019 Hair tour.
- Richard Anthony-Lloyd – Richard took part in many of the founding company and BrassNeck Theatre shows, and was Chairman of both Stampede Theatre Company, and then later BrassNeck Theatre company until 2018. Richard is an understudy on the 2018/19 tour of Calendar Girls.
- Katharine Pearson – performed with BrassNeck Theatre in their production of RENT as Mimi. Katherine appeared in the ensemble of the 2017/18 West End production of 42nd Street.
