= Moses Ayrton =

New Zealand Methodist minister

The Reverend Moses Ayrton
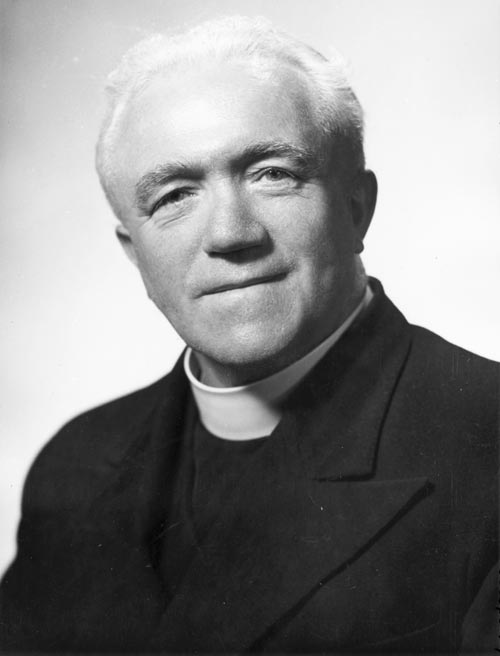

3rd Secretary of the Labour Party
- In office 1920–1922
- Leader: Harry Holland
- Preceded by: Michael Joseph Savage
- Succeeded by: Walter Nash

Personal details
- Born: 15 July 1878 Yeadon, Yorkshire, England
- Died: 3 October 1950 (aged 72) Wellington, New Zealand
- Party: Labour Party
- Other political affiliations: Social Democratic
- Spouse(s): Ethel Firth (m. 1900 d. 1939); Grace Pinfold (m. 1948)
- Children: 5
- Profession: Clergyman

Moses Ayrton (15 July 1878 – 3 October 1950) was a New Zealand Methodist minister and socialist.

== Biography ==
=== Early life ===
He was born in Yeadon, Yorkshire, England on 15 July 1878. His parents were Moses Airton, who was a woolen waste dealer, and his wife Martha Chappell. Ayrton worked through his youth as a grocer's assistant and also became a Wesleyan Methodist lay reader. He also became politically minded and joined the Independent Labour Party which reflected his Christian beliefs, compassion and social conscience. When he was 18 he was ordained as a member of the Methodist clergy. On 6 November 1900 he married his first wife Ethel Firth at Rawdon, Yorkshire. Ayrton emigrated to New Zealand in 1908 and from 1910 to 1919 served as a missionary in North Taranaki, Tauranga, Greymouth, Runanga, Denniston. During his time in Tauranga Ethel and their three children arrived in New Zealand. The Ayrtons had two additional children in New Zealand.

=== Political involvement ===
Whilst in Runanga Ayrton was elected to the Runanga Borough Council and the Grey Hospital Board as a Labour member. During this period he was also a nominator of Paddy Webb's for candidacy in the 1913 Grey by-election and was to serve as Webb's campaign chairman. Ayrton was a member of the local Social Democratic Party executive and would represent it at national conferences. He would later serve as the party's vice president in from 1915 to 1916.

He was an unsuccessful Labour Party candidate in the Palmerston electorate in the 1919 election where he came runner up. He later served as the Labour Party's secretary from 1920 until 1922.

=== Later life and death ===
Ayrton retired from the church in 1945, but still continued to perform some ministerial duties. His first wife Ethel died on 23 October 1939. Ayrton married Grace Pinfold (née Darling), at Wellington on 10 June 1948. After some years of poor health he died at Wellington on 3 October 1950. He was survived by his second wife Grace and his children.

== Notes ==
Party political offices
Preceded by Michael Joseph Savage	Secretary of the Labour Party; 1920–1922	Succeeded by Walter Nash
Preceded by Frederick Cooke	Vice-President of the Social Democratic Party; 1915–1916	Party disestablished
