= Listed buildings in Guiseley and Rawdon =

Guiseley and Rawdon is a ward in the metropolitan borough and Rawdon is a civil parish in the City of Leeds, West Yorkshire, England. This list also contains the listed buildings in Otley and Yeadon ward. The wards and parish contain 99 listed buildings that are recorded in the National Heritage List for England. Of these, one is listed at Grade I, the highest of the three grades, three are at Grade II*, the middle grade, and the others are at Grade II, the lowest grade. The wards and parish contain the towns of Guiseley and Yeadon, the villages of Rawdon and Hawksworth, and the surrounding area. Most of the listed buildings are houses, cottages and associated structures, farmhouses and farm buildings. The other listed buildings include churches and items in churchyards, a village cross, a school, a former hospital, a railway bridge, a railway tunnel portal and retaining walls, a former tram shed, a town hall, and a telephone kiosk.

== Key ==
Grade	Criteria
I	Buildings of exceptional interest, sometimes considered to be internationally important
II*	Particularly important buildings of more than special interest
II	Buildings of national importance and special interest

== Buildings ==
Name and location	Photograph	Date	Notes	Grade
St Oswald's Church, Guiseley; 53.87518°N 1.70607°W		Late 11th or early 12th century	The church, which has been altered and extended, was restored in 1866, and extended in 1909–10 by Sir Charles Nicholson. It consists of a nave with a clerestory, a south aisle, a south porch, a chancel with a south transept, and a west tower, and a later north nave, aisle and chancel. The tower has three stages, diagonal buttresses, a three-light west window, a clock face, and a machicolated embattled parapet with gargoyles and crocketed corner pinnacles.	I
Group of 18 monuments, St Oswald's Church; 53.87505°N 1.70614°W	—	Medieval	The monuments are in the churchyard on the south side of the south aisle and transept of the church. They date up to the 20th century, and consist of a medieval stone coffin, six tomb chests, and eleven slabs.	II
Monumental slab and coffin, St Oswald's Church; 53.87497°N 1.70634°W		Medieval	The monumental slab adjacent to the medieval stone coffin is dated 1658. The slab is to the memory of Elizabeth Hoppay, and carries an inscription. The coffin is without a lid, it was hewn from a single block, it has a tapering shape, and is shouldered inside.	II
Hawksworth Hall; 53.87108°N 1.74405°W		Early 16th century (probable)	A large house that has been much extended and altered, and used for other purposes. It is in sandstone with stone slate roofs, two storeys and a complex plan. It consists of the original hall and cross-wings, with an added hall range to the east, and two cross wings further to the east. One of the cross-wings has been converted into a porch. A two-storey canted bay window with a hipped roof has been added to the west wing, and a pedimented doorway with a cornice on scrolled brackets to the original east wing. The windows vary and include mullioned windows, transomed windows, sashes, a two-storey gabled oriel window and, at the rear, a tripartite stair window.	II*
Rawdon Hall; 53.84842°N 1.67984°W	—	Early 16th century	A house that was later altered, it is in sandstone with a stone slate roof. There is an extended T-shaped plan, consisting of a main range, and a cross-wing that has a further cross-wing at the west end. The west cross-wing has three storeys, and the rest of the house has two. In the centre of the main rage is a two-storey porch containing a Tudor arched outer doorway with a cambered inscribed lintel. On this front is a seven-light transomed window, above which is a four-light window, the lights with ogee heads. The other windows are mullioned, some with hood moulds.	II*
Layton Hall; 53.84771°N 1.66475°W	—	Late 16th century (probable)	A manor house, later a private house, it has been altered. The house is in sandstone, with quoins, and a stone slate roof with coped gables and kneelers. There are two storeys, and an F-shaped plan, with a main range and two projecting wings. Some of the windows are mullioned, and some openings have Tudor arched heads.	II
Rectory Hall; 53.87469°N 1.70490°W	—	1601	The rectory, later a private house, incorporates some possibly earlier timber framing, and it was restored in 1907 by Sir Charles Nicholson. The house is in sandstone on a chamfered plinth, and has a stone slate roof. There are two storeys and attics, five bays, the outer bays gabled, and at the rear is an outshut and a wing on the right. On the front is a two-storey gabled porch, the outer doorway with a moulded surround and a Tudor arched head. Above the lintel is a datestone with a Latin inscription, over which is a three-light transomed window, a two-light window with a hood mould, a coped gable with openwork finials on the kneelers, and an apex finial. The ground floor windows are mullioned and transomed, the upper floor windows are mullioned, and there are continuous hood moulds on both floors.	II*
Former farmhouse, Low fold 53.85425°N 1.68667°W	—	1612	The farmhouse, later altered and used for other purposes, is in sandstone with quoins and a stone slate roof. There are two storeys, three bays, and a rear outshut. On the front of the middle bay, steps lead up to a doorway in the upper floor that has a plain surround and a re-set initialled and dated lintel. To the left is a ground floor doorway and mullioned windows, and in the right bay the windows have been altered.	II
Hall Croft; 53.87196°N 1.74882°W	—	Early 17th century (probable)	A farmhouse that was partly rebuilt and extended in the 18th century, it is in sandstone with quoins and a stone slate roof, the gable end facing the road. There are two storeys and an attic. The part nearer the road has a single-depth plan, and the further parts, which protrude, have a double-depth plan. The doorway has a plain surround, and most of the windows are mullioned, with some mullions removed.	II
High Royds Hall; 53.88122°N 1.74399°W		Early to mid 17th century	A farmhouse, later converted into cottages, it is in sandstone on a plinth, with quoins, and a stone slate roof with coped gables and kneelers. There are three storeys, three bays, and a continuous rear outshut. At the left end is a gabled two-storey porch with a chamfered Tudor arched doorway, two peep-windows, and a mullioned window. The other windows are also mullioned, those in the lower two floors with continuous hood moulds, and at the rear is a gabled dormer. On each return is a modern gabled porch, and in the left return is a blocked taking-in door.	II
Barn south of 3 High Fold, Yeadon; 53.85677°N 1.69435°W	—	17th century	The barn, which incorporates earlier material, is in sandstone with quoins and a stone slate roof. There are three bays and a two-bay aisle on the west, giving an L-shaped plan. The barn contains a former wagon entry, doorways, and square openings.	II
Hawksworth Cottage; 53.87215°N 1.74894°W	—	17th century	The house, which incorporates earlier material, was later altered and extended. It is in sandstone with quoins and a stone slate roof. There are two storeys and three bays. The doorway has plain jambs and an ogee-shaped lintel. The window above the doorway has single light, and the other windows are mullioned.	II
Hollins Hill Farmhouse; 53.86535°N 1.72468°W	—	17th century (probable)	The farmhouse, which was remodelled in the 1720, is in sandstone with quoins and a stone slate roof. There are two storeys and a symmetrical front of five bays. Steps lead up to the central doorway that has a moulded architrave and a false keystone. The windows have moulded architraves, the window above the doorway is blocked, and the others contain replacement sashes. Over the doorway is an ogival panel with initials and a date. At the rear is a doorway with a chamfered surround and an ogee-shaped lintel.	II
Low Hall; 53.85962°N 1.69574°W		17th century	A farmhouse that was extensively restored and extended in 1876. It is in sandstone with a roof mainly of stone slate with some slate. There are two storeys and attics, a front of three bays, and a wing added to the rear on the left. On the front is a two-storey porch moved from elsewhere, that has a moulded Tudor arched doorway with shields in spandrels, and an oriel window above with a date in the sill. The windows are mullioned, some also with transoms. In the left gable end is a two-storey canted bay window. The extension has a cross-wing at the end, and in the angle is an oriel window with an embattled parapet.	II
The Manor House, Hawksworth; 53.87180°N 1.74905°W	—	17th century	A sandstone house with a stone slate roof, two storeys, a rectangular plan, and two bays. On the front is a single-storey gabled porch. Most of the windows are mullioned, some have been altered, in the left gable end facing the road are two small round-headed windows, and at the other end is a conservatory, with a cellar beneath.	II
6 and 7 High Fold, Yeadon; 53.85673°N 1.69411°W	—	Late 17th century	A farmhouse that was extended in the 18th century and later divided, it is in sandstone with quoins, stone slate roofs and coped gables. There are two storeys, the original part has three bays, the extension to the right has one bay, and there is a single-storey dairy at the rear. The doorway has a chamfered surround and a large rectangular lintel. On the left return is a gabled porch with Tudor arched outer and inner doorways, and it contains stone benches. The windows are mullioned.	II
Dove Cottage; 53.84948°N 1.69090°W	—	Late 17th century	Two cottages, later combined, in gritstone, partly rendered, with stone slate roofs. There are two storeys, some windows are mullioned, and others are sashes. There is one original doorway with a chamfered surround, and other inserted doorways.	II
Hawkslyn; 53.87255°N 1.75106°W	—	Late 17th century	The house, which was remodelled in the 18th century, is in sandstone with a tile roof. There are two storeys, two bays, a continuous rear outshut, and a recessed single-bay wing on the left. The doorway has a plain lintel, and the windows vary. Some windows have single lights, some are mullioned, and others have been converted into cross casement windows.	II
Layton Ghyll; 53.84857°N 1.66257°W	—	Late 17th century	A farmhouse, later a private house, in sandstone, with quoins, and a stone slate roof with coped gables and kneelers. There are two storeys, a double depth plan, and a symmetrical front of five bays. In the centre is a doorway with an architrave, and the windows on the front are a mix of sashes, cross windows and casements. In the right return is a mullioned window.	II
Mullion Cottage, Squirrel Cottage, and Wayside; 53.87156°N 1.74804°W	—	Late 17th century	A farmhouse divided into three cottages, it is in sandstone with quoins, and stone slate roofs with coped gables and kneelers. There are two storeys, and three bays. The main doorway has a moulded surround, and a shaped lintel with a carved scallop, and there are inserted doorways to the right and in the left return. The windows are mullioned, with some mullions removed.	II
Storth House Farmhouse; 53.87468°N 1.76769°W	—	Late 17th century	The farmhouse, which was extended with a parallel rear wing in the 18th century, is in sandstone, with quoins, and a two-span stone slate roof with coped gables. There are two storeys, a double-depth plan, and a symmetrical front of two bays. In the centre is a gabled porch with a Tudor arched outer doorway. The windows are mullioned, with altered glazing.	II
Thorpe Farmhouse; 53.87543°N 1.73305°W	—	Late 17th century (probable)	The farmhouse is in sandstone with quoins, and a stone slate roof with coped gables and kneelers. There are two storeys, a double depth plan, and two bays. On the front is a later gabled porch and a doorway with a plain surround. The windows are mullioned, with some mullions removed. On the right return is a doorway with a blocked taking-in door above.	II
Manor House, Guiseley; 53.87750°N 1.70575°W		1681	A sandstone house with quoins, and a stone slate roof with a coped gable and kneelers on the right. There are two storeys and two bays. The central doorway has a dated lintel, above is it a single-light window, and the other windows are mullioned, with some mullions removed. Above the openings in the ground floor is a continuous hood mould, stepped over the doorway. Also on the front is a square sundial.	II
Group of four Hird and Longbottam monuments, St Peter's Church; 53.84920°N 1.66586°W	—	c. 1695	The monuments are in the churchyard to the south of the chancel, and are to the memory of members of the Hird and Longbottom families. They consist of four sandstone slabs, with dates between 1695 and 1728.	II
Quaker Meeting House; 53.85643°N 1.68535°W		1697	The meeting house, which was extended in 1826, is in gritstone, with a roof of imitation stone and coped gables. It has a single storey, a rectangular plan, and four bays. On the front is a doorway and two-light mullioned windows.	II
Guiseley Cross; 53.87599°N 1.70675°W		17th or 18th century	The village cross was restored in 1915. It is in sandstone, with the oldest part being a base of three worn steps. The shaft is chamfered, and carries an inscription and the date of 1915.	II
Sunnyside Farmhouse and barn 53.87302°N 1.75369°W	—	Late 17th or early 18th century	The buildings are in sandstone, partly pebble dashed, with quoins and a stone slate roof with a coped gable and kneelers at the west end. There are two storeys, and the house has a double-depth plan and two bays. At the rear facing the road is a central doorway with a chamfered lintel and mullioned windows. At the front is an inserted doorway, and the windows have been altered. The barn is recessed on the east and has five bays and an outshut. It contains doorways with chamfered surrounds and Tudor arched lintels, an owl hole with a perch, and at the rear is a segmental-headed cart entry.	II
Intake Farmhouse and barn 53.88621°N 1.72187°W	—	c. 1700	The farmhouse and attached barn are in sandstone with quoins, and a stone slate roof with a coped gable and kneelers on the right. The house has two storeys and two bays. At the junction with the barn is a porch and a Tudor arched doorway. The windows on the front are mullioned, and elsewhere they vary. The barn is down the slope to the left and has five bays. It contains a segmental-arched cart entry with a loft window above, and the other openings include doorways, mullioned windows and vents.	II
Manor Farmhouse; 53.86466°N 1.71831°W	—	c. 1700	The farmhouse, which has been extended to the rear, is in sandstone, and has a stone slate roof with coped gables and kneelers. There are two storeys, a front of two bays, and a pair of gabled rear wings. The doorway has a chamfered surround and an ogee-shaped lintel. Above the doorway is a single-light window with a segmental head and hollow spandrels, and the other windows are mullioned.	II
Group of six monuments, St Oswald's Church; 53.87503°N 1.70591°W	—	c. 1700	The monuments are in the churchyard in the corner of paths to the southeast of the church. They are dated between 1680 and 1740, and consist of two tomb chests, one headstone, and three slabs.	II
St Peter's Church, Rawdon; 53.84930°N 1.66606°W		1706	The oldest part of the church is the tower, and the rest of the church was rebuilt in 1864. The church is built in sandstone with a stone slate roof, and consists of a nave, a south aisle, a chancel, and a west tower. The tower is unbuttressed and has three stages. In the south front is a doorway with a chamfered surround and a pointed arched head, and above it is in initialled datestone. Over this is a clock face, a bell window, a drip mould with gargoyles, an embattled parapet, and a low pyramidal roof with a weathervane. The aisle has four gabled bays, and the east window has three lights.	II
Foster monument, St Peter's Church; 53.84923°N 1.66582°W	—	c. 1713	The monument is in the churchyard to the south of the chancel, and is to the memory of Samuel Foster. It consists of a sandstone slab with a border of simplified linked flower trumpets, and has long inscriptions in primitive lettering.	II
Barn southwest of Manor Farmhouse; 53.86440°N 1.71862°W	—	1720	A sandstone barn with a stone slate roof, five bays, and two aisles on the front, making a U-shaped plan. Between the aisles is a wagon entrance, and in the aisles are former doorways, the right one blocked, and the left doorway converted into a window with a dated and initialled lintel.	II
28 Back Lane, Guiseley; 53.87310°N 1.71772°W		1725	A house in a row, it is in sandstone with quoins and a stone slate roof. There are two storeys and two bays. The doorway has an architrave, an impost, and a moulded lintel, and above it is an initialled datestone. Over this is a single-light window, and the other windows are mullioned, with some mullions removed.	II
Exley tomb chest, St Peter's Church; 53.84920°N 1.66598°W	—	c. 1725	The tomb chest is in the churchyard to the south of the aisle, and is to the memory of members of the Exley family. The tomb is in sandstone, and has plain sides, a lid with a moulded edge, a foliated arched head with a carved head in the keystone, and a winged angel head in the spandrels.	II
24 and 26 Gill Lane, Yeadon; 53.85990°N 1.69329°W	—	Early 18th century	A farmhouse, later altered and divided, it is in sandstone with quoins, moulded gutter brackets, and a stone slate roof with coped gables and kneelers. There are two storeys and attics, a double-depth plan, and two bays. The central doorway has a moulded architrave, and on the right return is a later gabled porch. The windows are mullioned, and some mullions have been removed.	II
Cobblestones; 53.87246°N 1.75084°W		Early 18th century (probable)	A sandstone house that was later extended to the right, with quoins and a stone slate roof. There are two storeys and three bays. The doorway has plain jambs, and the windows are mullioned with three lights.	II
Tombs, grave markers and walls, Cragg Wood Baptist Burial Ground; 53.84537°N 1.68981°W	—	Early 18th century	The rectangular burial ground is enclosed by sandstone walls with sides of about 18 metres (59 ft) and 12 metres (39 ft). Within the ground are 19 sandstone tombs and grave markers, most of them on the ground, and two grave stones have been moved and are fixed to the northeast wall.	II
Gate piers, Hawksworth Hall; 53.87032°N 1.74071°W	—	Early 18th century (probable)	The gate piers at the east entrance to the grounds of the hall are in sandstone, and are about 0.5 metres (1 ft 8 in) wide and 2 metres (6 ft 7 in) high. They are rusticated, and have chamfered plinths and moulded caps.	II
Outbuilding north of Hollins Hill Farmhouse; 53.86542°N 1.72476°W	—	Early 18th century (probable)	The outbuilding is in sandstone with quoins and a stone slate roof. There are two storeys, and it contains two doorways with chamfered surrounds. In the gable end is a flight of open steps, cantilevered from the wall, leading to a loft door.	II
Intake Side Farmhouse and barn 53.87177°N 1.75901°W	—	Early 18th century	The attached barn dates probably from the early 19th century. The buildings are in sandstone with quoins, and a stone slate roof with coped gables and kneelers. The house has two storeys, a gabled porch to the right, garage doors to the left, and mullioned windows with some mullions removed. The barn to the right has five bays, and it contains a flat-arched cart entry with splayed voussoirs.	II
Meeting House Cottage and stable 53.85620°N 1.68536°W		Early 18th century (probable)	The warden's cottage to the meeting house, it is in sandstone, with quoins, and a stone slate roof. There are two storeys and three bays. The doorway has a chamfered surround, the windows are sashes, and to the left is a single-story former stable.	II
Group of five monuments, St Oswald's Church; 53.87516°N 1.70585°W	—	Early 18th century	The monuments are in the churchyard in the angle between the chancel and the vestry. They are dated between 1708 and 1790, and consist of two tomb chests and three slabs.	II
Group of four Hardaker and Booth monuments, St Peter's Church; 53.84928°N 1.66578°W	—	Early 18th century	The monuments are in the churchyard to the east of the chancel, and to the memory of members of the Hardaker and Booth families. They are in sandstone, and consist of two tomb chests and two slabs, with dates between 1704(?) and 1766.	II
Hawkstone Farmhouse; 53.86526°N 1.72944°W	—	1726	The farmhouse is in sandstone with quoins, and a stone slate roof with coped gables and kneelers. There are two storeys, a double-depth L-shaped plan, consisting of a main block of two bays, and a rear outshut. On the front is a gabled porch and a doorway with a chamfered surround and a shaped lintel. Above the porch is a datestone, and the windows are mullioned.	II
50 Park Road, Guiseley; 53.87208°N 1.71045°W	—	Early to mid 18th century	A sandstone house with quoins, and a stone slate roof with coped gables and kneelers. There are two storeys, a double-depth plan, two bays, and a rear extension. The doorway has a plain surround, and the windows are mullioned with three lights.	II
38 Town Street, Guiseley; 53.87714°N 1.70530°W	—	Early to mid 18th century	A farmhouse, later extended to the right, it is in sandstone with quoins and a stone slate roof. There are two storeys and three bays. The two doorways have plain surrounds, the windows are mullioned, with some mullions removed, and a bow window has been inserted into the extension.	II
51 and 53 Town Street, Guiseley; 53.87739°N 1.70585°W		Early to mid 18th century	A house (No. 53) and an attached cottage (No. 51), they are in sandstone, and have a stone slate roof with a coped gable and kneelers on the left. There are two storeys, the cottage has one bay, and the house has two. The doorways have plain surrounds, above the doorway of the house is a single-light window, and the other windows are mullioned with three lights.	II
1 High Fold, Yeadon; 53.85702°N 1.69436°W	—	Early to mid 18th century	The house is in sandstone with quoins and a stone slate roof. There are two storeys, a double-depth plan, and two bays. The doorway has a plain surround, and the windows are mullioned, those in the left bay with three lights and those in the right bay with two.	II
Lane Side Farmhouse; 53.86818°N 1.72986°W	—	Early to mid 18th century	A sandstone farmhouse with quoins, and a stone slate roof with coped gables and kneelers. There are two storeys, a double-depth plan, and two bays. The central doorway has a plain surround, and the windows are mullioned with three lights. In the upper floor of the left gable end is a blocked doorway.	II
Outbuilding southwest of Lane Side Farmhouse; 53.86814°N 1.72998°W	—	Early to mid 18th century	The outbuilding is in sandstone and has a turf roof. It consists of a single cell, and is built into the slope of a hill. The building has a vaulted construction, and a doorway in the gable end.	II
Former Rawdon Free School; 53.84977°N 1.66771°W	—	Early to mid 18th century	The school, later a house, is in sandstone on a moulded plinth, with rusticated quoins, and a stone slate roof with coped gables and kneelers. There are two storeys, a symmetrical front of three bays, and a rear outshut. In the left gable end, external steps with a parapet lead up to a doorway with a chamfered surround, and in the ground floor is a doorway with a Tuscan column on the right.	II
Willow Cottage; 53.86509°N 1.68690°W		Early to mid 18th century (probable)	A house in sandstone, the front stuccoed, that has a stone slate roof with coped gables and moulded kneelers. There are two storeys and cellars, and an L-shaped plan, consisting of a front range of three bays, and a rear wing. The doorway has a plain surround, and the windows are mullioned. At the rear is a round-headed stair window and a blocked taking-in door.	II
Upper End Farmhouse; 53.87795°N 1.70489°W	—	1743	The farmhouse, which has been altered and extended, is in sandstone, partly rendered, with quoins, and a stone slate roof with coped gables and kneelers. There are two storeys, two bays with a later bay added to the right, and the gable end faces the road. On the front is a later gabled porch with an initialled datestone above the doorway. Over the porch is a single-light window, and the other windows are mullioned with two or three lights.	II
Monumental Hird slab, St Peter's Church; 53.84920°N 1.66604°W	—	c. 1747	The slab is in the churchyard to the south of the aisle, and is to the memory of John Hird and his wife. It is in sandstone, and has a moulded surround with scrolled corners, and contains raised decoration in sunk panels.	II
Group of three Hird monuments, St Peter's Church; 53.84922°N 1.66579°W	—	c. 1750	The monuments are in the churchyard to the southeast of the chancel, and are to the memory of members of the Hird family. They consist of three sandstone slabs with varied decoration and inscriptions, and with dates between 1750 and 1775.	II
3, 5 and 7 Ivegate and 1 and 3 Town Street, Yeadon; 53.86591°N 1.68572°W	—	18th century	A group of mill buildings of different dates later converted into shops, they are in sandstone with a three-span stone slate roof. The buildings are on a sloping site, and have two storeys at the top of the hill and four at the bottom. On the front are three gables, and the other features include quoins, windows of varying types, including sashes and mullioned windows, and an initialled datestone.	II
Entrance gateway and wall, Friends' Meeting House; 53.85623°N 1.68567°W	—	18th century (probable)	The wall is in sandstone, about 2.5 metres (8 ft 2 in) high, with rounded coping. In the centre is a gateway with a moulded surround, and a straight lintel making a flat arch. It contains later iron gates, and on the lintel is a wrought iron lamp holder and a central lamp.	II
Springside Farmhouse and Cottage; 53.87234°N 1.75107°W	—	18th century	A farmhouse later divided, it is in sandstone with quoins and a stone slate roof. There are two storeys and cellars, a double-depth plan, and two bays. On the front is a later porch and two doorways, some of the windows are mullioned, and others are replacements.	II
The Old Rawdon Manse; 53.85628°N 1.69179°W	—	18th century	A sandstone house that was later enlarged, it has quoins, and a stone slate roof with coped gables. There are two storeys, a symmetrical front of three bays, a later recessed wing on the left, a rear kitchen wing, and an outbuilding. The central doorway has a plain surround and the windows are mullioned.	II
Main Block, Woodhouse Grove School; 53.84017°N 1.70035°W		18th century	A small country house, later altered and converted into a school, it is in stone on a plinth, with a band, moulded eaves, a parapet, and a slate roof. There are two storeys and an H-shaped plan, consisting of an eleven-bay main range and taller projecting three-bay wings. The central doorway has a porch with two columns, and the windows are sashes, some with pediments. The wings have dentilled eaves and hipped roofs, and in the ground floor are round-headed windows with moulded surrounds and an impost band. At the rear is a block containing Venetian windows.	II
Music Room, School Shop and Offices, Woodhouse Grove School; 53.84045°N 1.70081°W		Mid 18th century	A barn, coach house and stables that have been converted into a schoolroom, a shop and offices. The buildings are in stone with quoins and slate roofs. The west gable end of the former barn contains a blocked doorway flanked by round-headed windows, over which is an inscribed plaque, and a square clock tower with corner pilasters, bracketed eaves, and a pyramidal roof with a weathervane. The former stables have five bays with a pediment over the middle three bays, and in the former coach house are round-headed coach entrances.	II
2 and 3 High Fold, Yeadon; 53.85688°N 1.69438°W	—	Mid to late 18th century (probable)	A pair of cottages in sandstone with quoins and a stone slate roof. There are two storeys, a double-depth plan, and each cottage has one bay. The doorways have plain surrounds, and the windows are mullioned with three lights.	II
Dean Grange Farmhouse and barn 53.86174°N 1.63729°W	—	Mid to late 18th century	The farmhouse and barn are in sandstone, with quoins, and stone slate roofs with coped gables. The house has two storeys, a double-depth plan, and three bays. On the front is a porch and a doorway with a plain surround, the windows are mullioned, and there is a stair cross window at the rear. The barn is at right angles to the rear of the house, and is a long range containing a blocked segmental-arched cart entry with an inserted doorway, a stable door, a window, and a loading door.	II
Ivy Cottage; 53.85073°N 1.68067°W	—	Mid to late 18th century	A farmhouse, later a private house, in sandstone, with quoins, and a stone slate roof with coped gables. There are two storeys and an L-shaped plan, with a symmetrical front of three bays and a rear outshut. The central doorway has a plain surround, and the windows are mullioned.	II
Old Larkfield and Larkfield Cottage; 53.85160°N 1.67635°W	—	Mid to late 18th century	A house, later divided, in sandstone, with a stone slate roof and coped gables. There are two storeys and an attic, a double-depth plan, and a front of three bays, with a later bay to the right. On the front is a sash window, and the other windows are mullioned. In the left gable end is a round-headed window with imposts and a keystone, and at the rear is a tall round-headed stair window, and a blocked taking-in door.	II
Stoney Croft; 53.85433°N 1.67931°W	—	Mid to late 18th century	A pair of mirror-image cottages in sandstone, with quoins, and a stone slate roof with coped gables and kneelers. There are two storeys, and each cottage has one bay. The doorways in the outer parts have plain surrounds and large lintels, and the windows are mullioned.	II
Headstone to G. Rhodes, St Oswald's Church; 53.87497°N 1.70621°W	—	1775	The headstone is in the churchyard to the south of the porch. It is in sandstone, and has a moulded surround and a shaped upper edge, and it carries an inscription.	II
4 and 5 High Fold, Yeadon; 53.85690°N 1.69413°W	—	Late 18th century	A pair of cottages, No. 5 being the earlier, and No. 4 dating from the early 19th century. They are in sandstone with quoins and stone slate roofs. There are two storeys, a double-depth plan, No. 5 has one bay, and No. 4 has two. The doorways have plain surrounds, the windows of No. 4 are mullioned, and those of No. 5 have been altered or inserted.	II
60 and 62 Town Street, Guiseley; 53.87803°N 1.70488°W		Late 18th century	A pair of sandstone houses with moulded gutter brackets and a stone slate roof. There are two storeys, and each house has two bays. The doorways have plain surrounds and canopies, and the windows are mullioned, with two or three lights.	II
Burwood Cottage and The Folly; 53.85288°N 1.69345°W	—	Late 18th century	A sandstone house that has a stone slate roof with saddlestones. There are two storeys and an attic, and three bays. Above the central porch is a blind Venetian window, the other windows are mullioned with four lights, and in the roof is a gabled dormer with a two-light window.	II
Cold store north of Dean Grange Farmhouse; 53.86288°N 1.63734°W	—	Late 18th century (probable)	The cold store is a rectangular sandstone structure covered in turf, half sunk in the ground. It has a vaulted roof, and a round-arched entrance leading to a doorway on the east side.	II
Park Gate House; 53.86835°N 1.71866°W	—	Late 18th century	A large house that was extended in the 19th century, it is in sandstone and has slate roofs. The main block has a hipped roof, a string course, a sill band, a modillioned cornice, and a low parapet. There are two storeys and a symmetrical front of five bays, the middle three bays projecting under a pediment. In the centre is a doorway with a semicircular fanlight, and a Tuscan porch with a festooned frieze, above which is a balcony with ornamental iron railings on a semi-oval plan. The window above is tripartite and has an entablature with rosettes, and a recessed tympanum that breaks the pediment. The other windows are sashes, those in the upper floor with balustraded aprons. In the right return is a bow window with a blind Venetian window above. Attached to the house are an eight-bay service wing and another three-bay wing.	II
Acacia Farm; 53.84425°N 1.69602°W		c. 1784 (probable)	An estate farm that was altered and extended in 1847, and later. The farm buildings are in sandstone with vermiculated rustication, and the roofs are of stone slate, with some later replacements in metal and slate. The buildings are arranged around two courtyards, with the farmhouse in the southwest corner. The farmhouse has two storeys and a basement and contains quoins, coped gables, porches and sash windows. The other farm buildings include stables, cowsheds, barns, a coach house and a cart shed.	II
Tower, Woodhouse Grove School; 53.84010°N 1.70190°W	—	c. 1799	The tower in the grounds of the school is a folly in red brick faced in stone, with stone dressings. There are two storeys and a rectangular plan. It stands on a plinth approached by five steps with iron railings. Each face on the lower storey has a large open pointed arch, and in the upper storey is a four-centred arch with an iron railing, a hood mould, and blank shields. At the top is a band with battlements.	II
Group of five monuments, St Peter's Church; 53.84907°N 1.66593°W	—	Late 18th to early 19th century	The monuments are in the churchyard to the south of the church, and are to the memory of various individuals and families. They are in sandstone, and consist of a table monument and four slabs, with dates between 1785 and 1814.	II
Honeysuckle Cottage; 53.85263°N 1.69348°W	—	c. 1800–20	A cottage used as a shop, it is in sandstone with a stone slate roof. There are two storeys and one bay. Over the doorway is a two-light mullioned window, and in the gable end facing the road is a shop window and a single-light window above.	II
Two tomb chests, St Oswald's Church; 53.87498°N 1.70603°W	—	1805	The two tomb chests in the churchyard are in sandstone, they are placed side-by-side, and are in matching style. The older is to the memory of Hannah Wilkinson, and the later, dated 1829, is to the memory of Mary Cooper. The sides have decorated panels, the lid of the older tomb has an arched head, a fluted keystone, and winged angel heads in the spandrels, and the other has an inscription in Gothic style.	II
Lamp post, St Oswald's Church; 53.87506°N 1.70646°W	—	Early 19th century	The lamp post is in the churchyard to the southwest of the church. It consists of three sandstone clustered Tuscan columns on a square base with a polygonal cap, surmounted by a cast iron standard with scrolled brackets and a glazed lamp-holder.	II
Crow Trees; 53.85145°N 1.68245°W	—	c. 1825–26	An earlier house resited and rebuilt, it is in stone on a chamfered plinth, with a string course, and a stone slate roof with coped gables, shaped kneelers and finials. There are two storeys and an attic, and an H-shaped plan, consisting of two parallel three-bay ranges and a short link. On the southwest front are two gables, each with an oculus and a re-set datestone. The windows are mullioned, some also with transoms. On the right return is a doorway with a quoined and moulded architrave, a bi-cusped lintel, and a chamfered fanlight.	II
South portal, Bramhope Tunnel; 53.86266°N 1.63442°W		1845–49	The portal at the south end of the tunnel was built by the Leeds and Thirsk Railway. It is in sandstone and consists of a single horseshoe arch with rusticated voussoirs, a cornice and a parapet.	II
Retaining walls south of south portal, Bramhope Tunnel; 53.86213°N 1.63438°W	—	1845–49	The walls retaining the cutting to the south of the portal are in sandstone, and extend on a slightly curved line for about 300 metres (980 ft). At intervals along the wall are piers with squared coping.	II
Bridge over railway cutting 53.86131°N 1.63400°W		1845–49	The bridge was built by the Leeds and Thirsk Railway to carry a track over a cutting on its line. It is in sandstone, and consists of a single semicircular arch with rusticated voussoirs. The bridge has a moulded cornice, and a parapet with flat coping and iron railings, and the arch is flanked by piers.	II
Trinity Church, Rawdon; 53.85774°N 1.68862°W		1846	The church is in sandstone with a green slate roof, and is in Early English style. It has a gabled front of three bays and six bays along the sides. The front has corner pilasters rising to form octagonal pinnacles with spires. In the centre is an arched doorway with a chamfered surround flanked by pilasters, and in the outer bays are blind arches, all with hood moulds. Above is a string course and an arcade of pointed arches with colonnettes. At the top are five stepped lancet windows, the outer ones blind, and a finial. Along the sides are lancet windows with hood moulds.	II
Micklefield House; 53.85331°N 1.68602°W		1847	A large house, later extended and used as offices, it is in sandstone, with bands, a dentilled eaves cornice, and a slate roof with red tile cresting. There are two storeys, attics and basements. The house has an L-shaped plan, with a symmetrical front range of six bays, and a later rear wing. The second and fifth bays on the front project and have shaped gables containing glazed trefoils. In the ground floor of these bays is a Gothic opening with spandrels and stepped hood moulds, on the left it is a doorway with an inscribed stone above, and on the right a six-light window. The ground floor of the middle two bays projects, it has triangular crenellations, and contains mullioned and transomed windows. In the upper floor are cross windows. The rear wing contains a two-storey bow window.	II
Trinity Church Sunday School; 53.85786°N 1.68875°W		1868	The Sunday school is in sandstone with a slate roof, and is in Early English style. There are four bays along the sides and a later bay at the rear. The front has a coped gable and buttresses. A single-storey gabled porch projects in the centre, and contains two arched doorways on the sides, lancet windows on the front, and it is flanked by lancet windows with hood moulds. Above the porch is a large hexafoiled circular window, and a small louvred trefoil, and on the gable apex is a finial. Along the sides are paired lancet windows.	II
Woodleigh Hall; 53.84051°N 1.66708°W	—	1869	A large house designed by Lockwood and Mawson, and later used for other purposes. It is in stone, and has two storeys and attics, and an L-shaped plan, it contains mullioned and transomed windows, and has shaped gables. In the centre is a porch with paired Corinthian columns, an entablature and a parapet with finials, and above it is a square tower with a bracketed cornice and an openwork parapet with finials. On the corners of the main block are semicircular oriel windows, and in the left return is a loggia of Tuscan columns. To the right of the main block is a conservatory with six bays, an entablature with finials, and a wrought iron framed roof with scrolled decoration.	II
Bronte House Preparatory School; 53.84425°N 1.69987°W		1872	A large house, later converted into a school, it is in stone on a chamfered plinth, with bands, and slate roofs with coped gables, kneelers and finials. There are two storeys and attics, a front of four gabled bays, and a single-storey extension at the rear. On the front is a porch with decorated battlements, containing two arches, one with a casement window, the other open, and inside is a segmental-headed doorway with a fanlight. To the left is a square bay window, and most of the other windows are sashes. In the rear extension are three canted bay windows with battlements.	II
Gate lodge and piers, Park Gate House; 53.86893°N 1.71743°W		Late 19th century	The lodge is in sandstone, with panelled corner pilasters, a modillioned cornice, a modillioned parapet, and a hipped slate roof. There is one storey and a symmetrical front of three bays. Facing the drive is a pedimented porch with corner pilasters, two Corinthian square pillars, and double doors with a segmental fanlight and impost bands. Flanking this are round-headed windows, each with pilaster jambs, a moulded head and a keystone. On the sides are canted bay windows. Flanking the entrance to the drive are three gate piers about 3 metres (9.8 ft) high. Each pier has channelled rustication, round-headed panels, a fluted frieze, and an urn finial. The ornamental gates are in cast iron, and curved walls lead to end piers.	II
Yeadon Town Hall; 53.86572°N 1.68452°W		1879–80	The town hall was designed by William Hill in French Gothic style, and is built in sandstone with slate roofs. There are two tall storeys, and the front is symmetrical, with a central clock tower. The tower has two stages and contains a doorway with a moulded surround and a hood mould, and at the top is a pyramidal roof with lucarnes. The outer bays have dormers with hipped and swept roofs and finials.	II
High Royds Hospital; 53.88206°N 1.73490°W		1884–88	The former mental hospital is in stone with roofs of Westmorland slate. It has an echelon plan with a central administrative block and wards projecting at angles. The administrative block has an entrance range, behind which is the former ballroom, service blocks including workshops, kitchens, storerooms, a laundry, and a fire station, and three pairs of wards. There are also former water towers with pyramidal roofs. The entrance range has three storeys, a symmetrical front of seven bays, the alternate bays gabled, and recessed two-storey two-bay wings. On two bays are canted bay windows with parapets. The roof is hipped with moulded coped gables, shaped kneelers and iron finials. The central tower has a clock face and a machicolated embattled parapet.	II
Buckstone Hall; 53.84593°N 1.68603°W	—	1884	A large house, later divided, designed by William and Richard Mawson, it is in gritstone with slate roofs and battlements. There are two storeys and an L-shaped plan. The south garden front has three two-storey canted bay windows with moulded bands. In the right corner is a circular turret with angle buttresses, slit windows, and battlements. In the left corner is a square three-storey tower with a projecting four-storey octagonal tower, and a projecting single-storey porch. The north front contains a three-light staircase window, and the other windows in the house are sashes. To the northeast is a service wing.	II
Woodhouse Grove Methodist Church and School Chapel; 53.84066°N 1.70290°W		1887	The church is in stone with a slate roof and decorative ridge tiles, and is in Gothic Revival style. It consists of a nave, a west porch, an apsidal chancel, and a northwest tower. The porch is gabled with a finial, and contains two doorways. The tower has a lancet window, above which is a quatrefoil, the bell stage is octagonal, and over this is an octagonal spire. The windows in the rest of the church are lancets.	II
Padgett tomb chest, St Oswald's Church; 53.87502°N 1.70579°W	—	1889	The tomb chest in the churchyard is in sandstone and polished granite, and is to the memory of Joseph Cawkwell Padgett. The tomb has a pitched lid, and is surrounded by a Gothic-style enclosure, with arcades of decorated pointed arches carrying the roof.	II
St Andrew's Church; 53.86769°N 1.68550°W		1890–91	The church is in sandstone with a slate roof, and is in Arts and Crafts Perpendicular style. It consists of a nave with a clerestory, a south aisle, a south porch, a double south transept and vestry, a chancel, and a southwest bell turret. The bell turret is octagonal, and has a wooden traceried bellcote and an ogival cap. The east window has seven lights with Perpendicular tracery.	II
Former tram shed 53.87749°N 1.72374°W		1914	The tram shed, later used for other purposes, is in sandstone with rusticated quoins, a floor band, a cornice, a low parapet, and a tile roof. There are two storeys, 19 bays, the middle three bays projecting, and canted wings at the ends. The ground floor windows have keystones, in the projecting bays are tall windows with triple keystones, and between these are vertical panels with roundels. In the wings are vehicle entrances with triple keystones and splayed voussoirs, and the left end contains three windows with horizontal panels between them, and above a high parapet with an inscribed panel.	II
Two lamp posts, St Oswald's Church; 53.87515°N 1.70650°W	—	Early 20th century	The lamp posts are by the side of the path leading up to the west door of the church, and are about 2 metres (6 ft 7 in) high. Each consists of a sandstone Tuscan column on a pedestal. On this is an ornamental wrought iron lamp standard on scrolled brackets, and a glazed lamp holder.	II
Lych gate, St Oswald's Church; 53.87524°N 1.70671°W		Early 20th century	The lych gate at the northwest corner of the churchyard is in sandstone with a stone slate roof, and consists of a gabled archway with a hood mould. In the gable is a statue of St Oswald on a corbel, and an inscription. On the inside walls are granite panels with inscriptions and the names of those lost in the First World War.	II
Telephone kiosk, Hawksworth; 53.87197°N 1.74956°W		1935	The telephone kiosk is of the K6 type, designed by Giles Gilbert Scott. Constructed in cast iron with a square plan and a dome, it has unperforated crowns in the top panels.	II
