= Rawdon Billing =

Hill in West Yorkshire, England, UK

Coordinates: 53.8541°N 1.6709°W

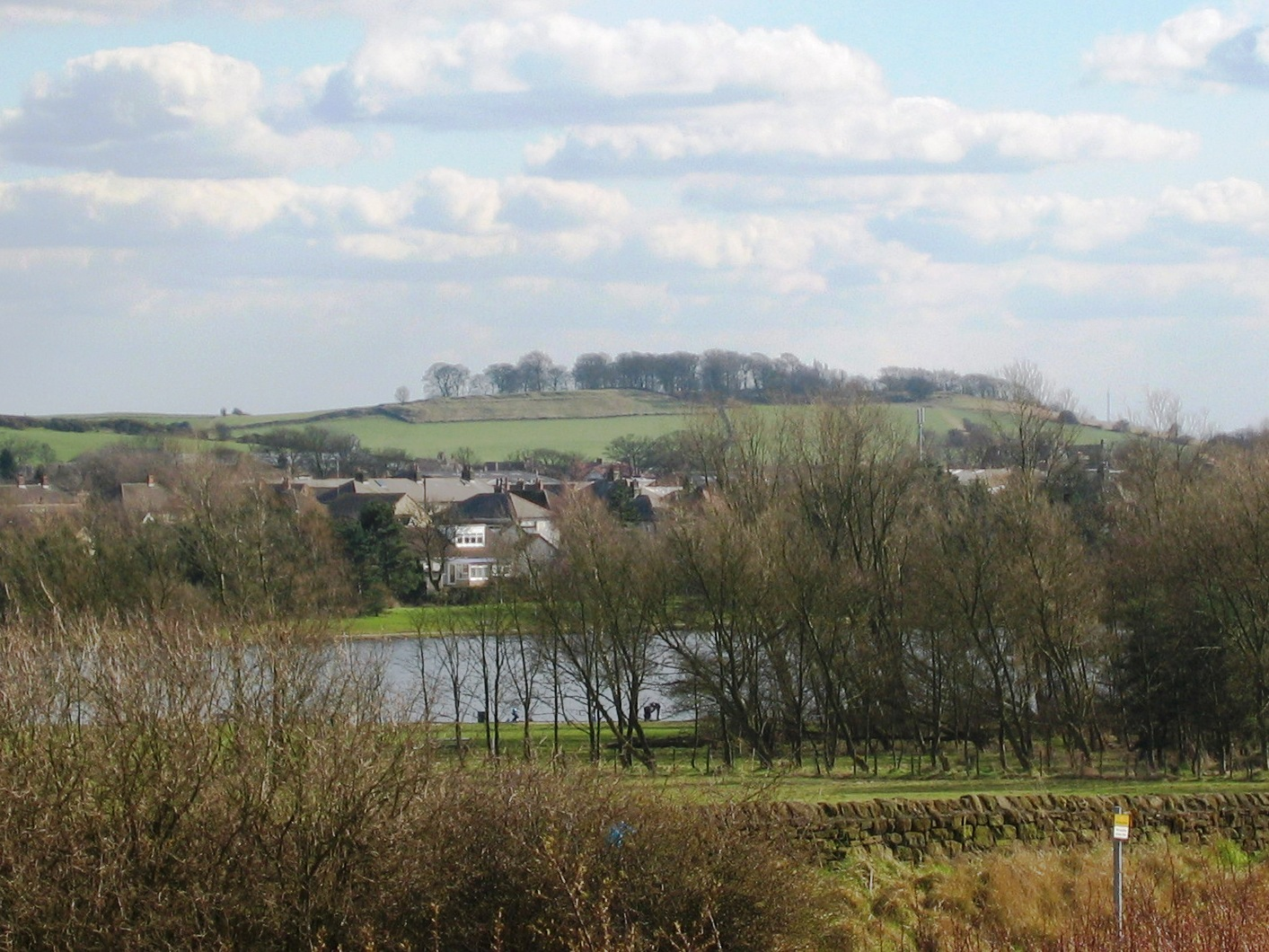
Rawdon Billing with Yeadon Tarn in the foreground, photographed from near the western end of Leeds Bradford Airport runway

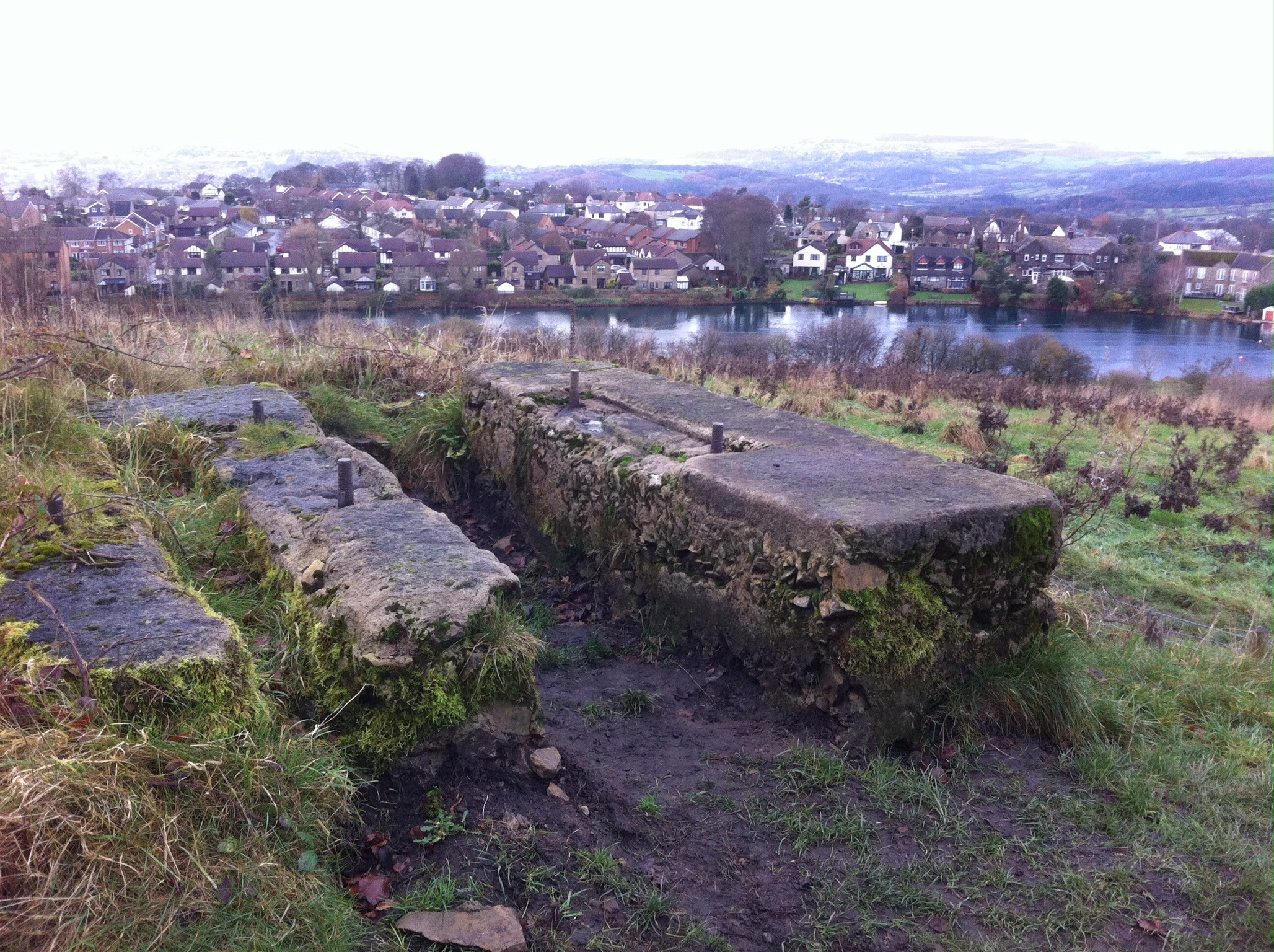
Foundations possibly for a World War II search light for Yeadon Aerodrome.

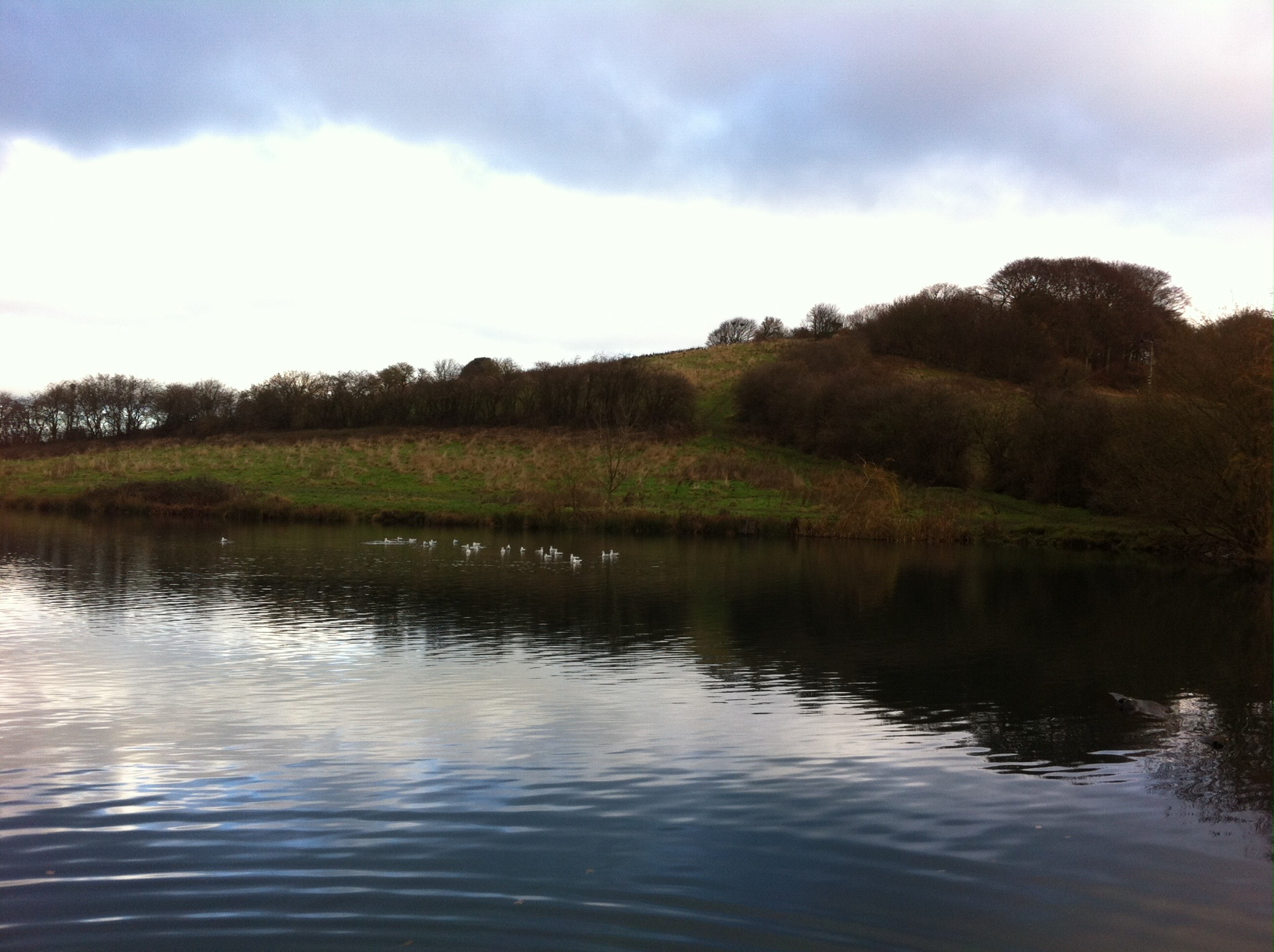
View of The Billing from Larkfield Dam.

Rawdon Billing, sometimes referred to as Billing Hill, is a tree-topped hill situated in Rawdon, West Yorkshire, England. Reaching an elevation of 231 metres (758 ft), it is a significant landmark in the Aireborough area.

The remains of a quarry, as well as concrete foundations for World War II defensive installations, can be found near the top. A number of local footpaths (81, 89, 90 and 91) cross the Billing or near to it, and it is possible to see many landmarks on a clear day, including York Minster, with a very good view of aircraft entering and leaving Leeds Bradford Airport.

It is owned by the Rawdon Trust, land agents for the Emmott family from Lancashire. The Billing is a popular place for local walkers and plane spotters as it overlooks Leeds Bradford Airport.

In 1778, a gold torc was found on the Billing. The whereabouts of the artifact is unknown.

Though sparse, there is evidence of coal on the Billing; however, though it was used previously as a quarry, there is no sign of mining.

Stone from the Billing was apparently used at the base of 48 Albion Street in Leeds city centre. The former bank now houses a Starbucks.
