= St Oswald's Church, Guiseley =

St Oswald's Church
- St Oswald King & Martyr
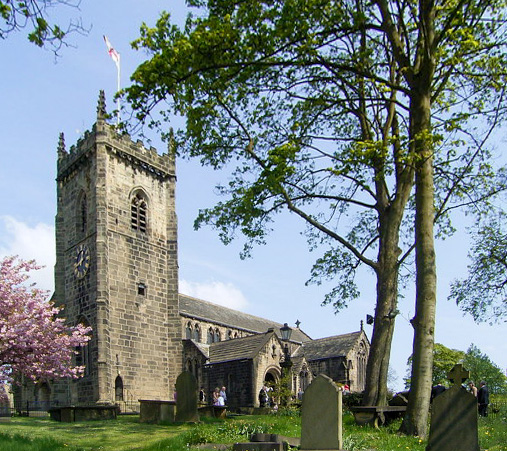
- St Oswald's Church
- 53°52′31″N 1°42′22″W
- OS grid reference: SE 19415 42145
- Location: Guiseley, West Yorkshire
- Country: England
- Denomination: Anglican

History
- Status: Parish church
- Dedication: Oswald of Northumbria

Specifications
- Materials: Sandstone

Administration
- Province: York
- Diocese: Leeds
- Archdeaconry: Leeds
- Parish: Guiseley with Esholt

St Oswald's Church in Guiseley, West Yorkshire, England, is an active Anglican parish church in the archdeaconry of Leeds and the Diocese of Leeds.

== History ==
The church dates back to the late-11th or early-12th century with later additions. The church was altered significantly by architect Sir Charles Nicholson in 1909. The church was Grade I listed on 19 September 1962.

The marriage of Patrick Brontë and Maria Branwell took place in the church on 29 December 1812.

== Architecture ==
The church is built of squared sandstone with a graduated slate roof. The church has a west tower and a combined nave and chancel.

== See also ==
- Grade I listed buildings in West Yorkshire
- List of places of worship in the City of Leeds
- Listed buildings in Guiseley and Rawdon
