= Corn Exchange, Hertford =

Commercial building in Hertford, Hertfordshire, England

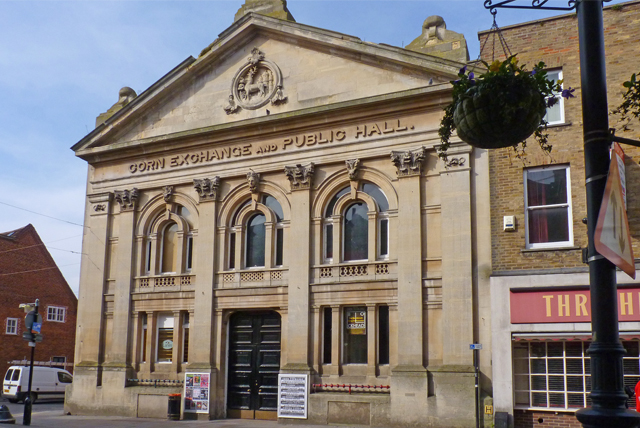
- Corn Exchange, Hertford

- Shown in Hertfordshire
- 51.7965°N 0.0764°W
- Location: Fore Street, Hertford

History
- Built: 1859

Site notes
- Architect: William Hill
- Architectural style: Neoclassical style

Listed Building – Grade II
- Official name: Former Corn Exchange and Public Hall
- Designated: 12 April 1973
- Reference no.: 1268936

The Corn Exchange is a commercial building on Fore Street in Hertford, Hertfordshire, England. The structure, which is currently used as an events venue, is a Grade II listed building.

== History ==
The site currently occupied by the corn exchange on the north side of Fore Street originally accommodated a jail which dated from around 1702 and which had been demolished in 1777 to make way for a butchers' market. Corn merchants traded in corn behind the Shire Hall until the first purpose-built corn exchange was erected immediately to the west of the Cross Keys Inn on Fore Street in the 1840s.

In the mid-19th century, civic leaders decided that the original structure was inadequate and should be replaced with a new structure. The new building was designed by William Hill of Leeds in the neoclassical style, built in ashlar stone and was completed in 1859. The design involved a symmetrical main frontage of three bays facing onto Fore Street. On the ground floor, the central bay contained a panelled doorway while the outer bays contained tri-partite windows where the parts were separated by antae. The first floor was fenestrated by three round headed windows with architraves and keystones, each with an inner window, where the parts were also separated by antae. The bays were flanked by Corinthian order pilasters which supported an entablature and a pediment. The entablature was inscribed with the words "Corn Exchange and Public Hall", while the pediment containing a circular panel bearing a carving of a hart in the tympanum. Internally, the principal room was the main hall which was intended to serve as a library when not in use for corn trading. The architectural historian, Nikolaus Pevsner, described the design as "like that of an ambitious methodist chapel".

The use of the building as a corn exchange declined significantly in the wake of the Great Depression of British Agriculture in the late 19th century. In August 1914, at the start of the First World War, recruits for the 4th (Militia) battalion, The Bedfordshire Regiment were billeted in the building. At the apex of the pediment there was originally a statue of the Roman goddess of agriculture, Ceres, but this was removed during the Second World War to prevent it causing injury to passers-by during German bombing.

The use of the building as a public events venue continued and performers who hosted vents in the corn hall included the rock band, The Who, in March 1965, and the rock band, The Kinks, in June 1966. In May 1979, East Hertfordshire District Council gave planning consent to convert the ground floor of the building, on the Market Street elevation, into shops while retaining the first floor for use as a public hall. The building was acquired by the concert promoter, Chris Addison, in 2008.

== See also ==
- Corn exchanges in England
