= Cornhill Corn Exchange, Banbury =

Commercial building in Banbury, England

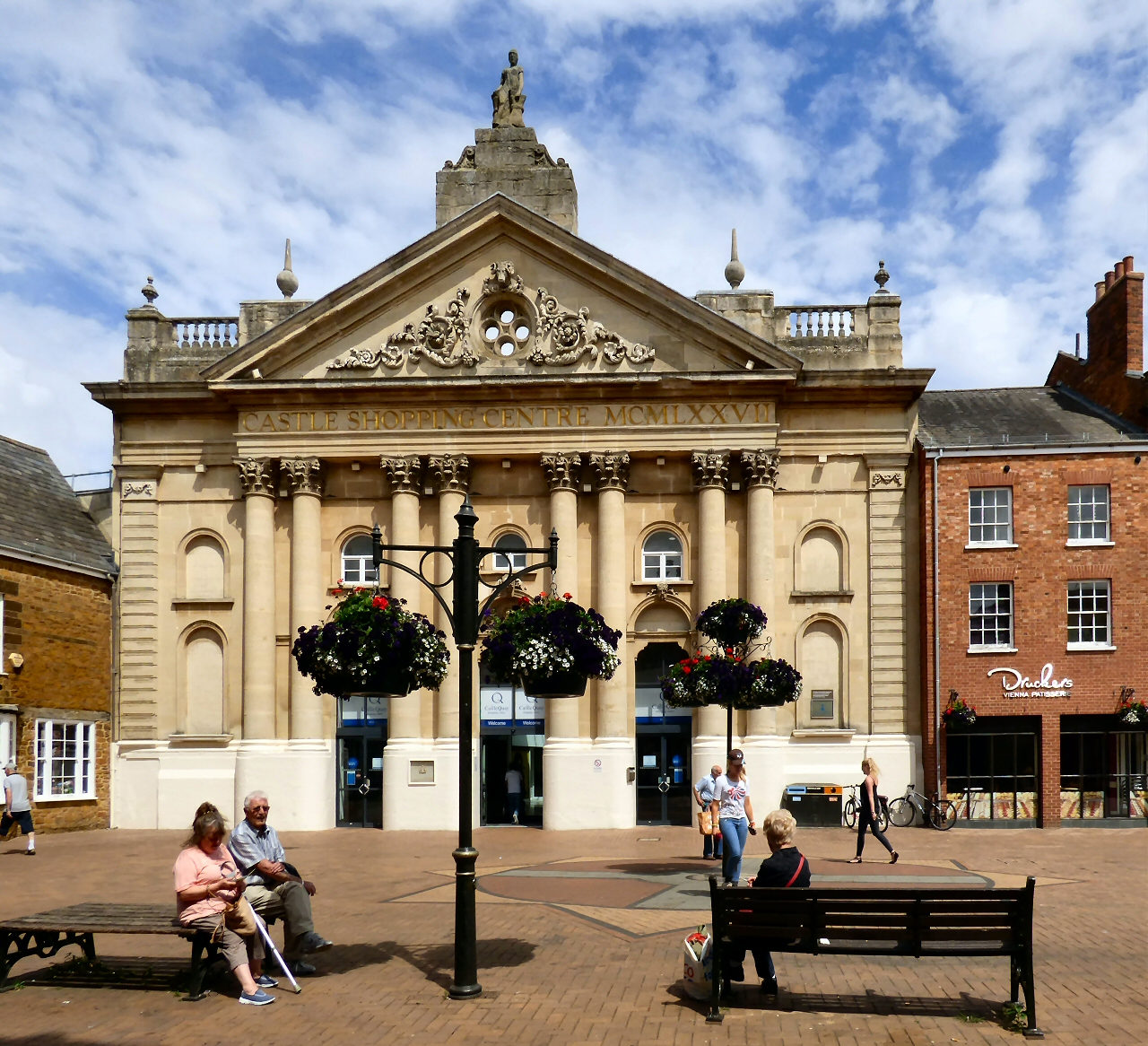
- Cornhill Corn Exchange, Banbury

- Shown in Oxfordshire
- 52.0626°N 1.3359°W
- Location: Market Place, Banbury

History
- Built: 1857

Site notes
- Architect: William Hill
- Architectural style: Neoclassical style

Listed Building – Grade II
- Official name: Façade, Cornhill Corn Exchange, Castle Centre
- Designated: 7 October 1969
- Reference no.: 1046917

The Cornhill Corn Exchange was a commercial building in the Market Place of Banbury, Oxfordshire, England. The façade of the building, which has been preserved, now forms an entrance to the Castle Quay Shopping Centre. It is a Grade II listed building.

== History ==
In the early 1850s, a group of local businessmen formed the Banbury Corn Exchange Company, to finance and commission a corn exchange for the town. The site they selected was in the northeast corner of the Market Place in an area known as Cornhill. The group received political support from the Conservative councillors and their building was financed by Gilletts Bank.

The new building was designed by William Hill of Leeds, built by Messrs Kimberly of Banbury in ashlar stone and was officially opened on 3 September 1857. The design involved a symmetrical main frontage of five bays facing onto the Market Place. The central section of the three bays featured tall round headed openings with architraves and keystones on the ground floor, and small round headed windows with architraves on the first floor. The outer bays contained blind round headed windows on both floors. The bays of the central section were flanked by pairs of Corinthian order columns supporting a frieze, an entablature and a pediment. There was a quatrefoil surmounted by a ram's head as well as fruit and foliage in the tympanum, and, at the apex of the pediment, there was a statue of the Roman goddess of agriculture, Ceres. The elaborate stone carving was undertaken by Thorpe and Ponder. The architectural historian, Nikolaus Pevsner, criticised the design describing it as "a pompous classical palace".

The Cornhill Corn Exchange got into financial difficulty after suffering substantial competition from a rival group of businessmen which formed the "Central Corn Exchange for Banbury Company": this group had political support from Liberal councillors and their building was financed by Cobbs Bank: it was erected on a site in the southwest corner of the Market Place and opened it on the same day as the Cornhill Corn Exchange. (Note: The Central Corn Exchange was given a new Renaissance style façade in around 1880, converted into the Palace Cinema in 1914, and re-purposed as a toy shop in 1961. It was demolished in 1979 and replaced by a branch of Midland Bank, with a main frontage designed in a similar style to the 1880 façade.)

The use of the building as a corn exchange declined significantly in the wake of the Great Depression of British Agriculture in the late 19th century. Instead, it was converted into a public house known as the Vine Tavern in 1891. Most of the building was demolished in 1973 leaving the façade to become the entrance to the new Castle Quay Shopping Centre.

== See also ==
- Corn exchanges in England
