= Yeadon Town Hall =

Municipal building in Yeadon, West Yorkshire, England

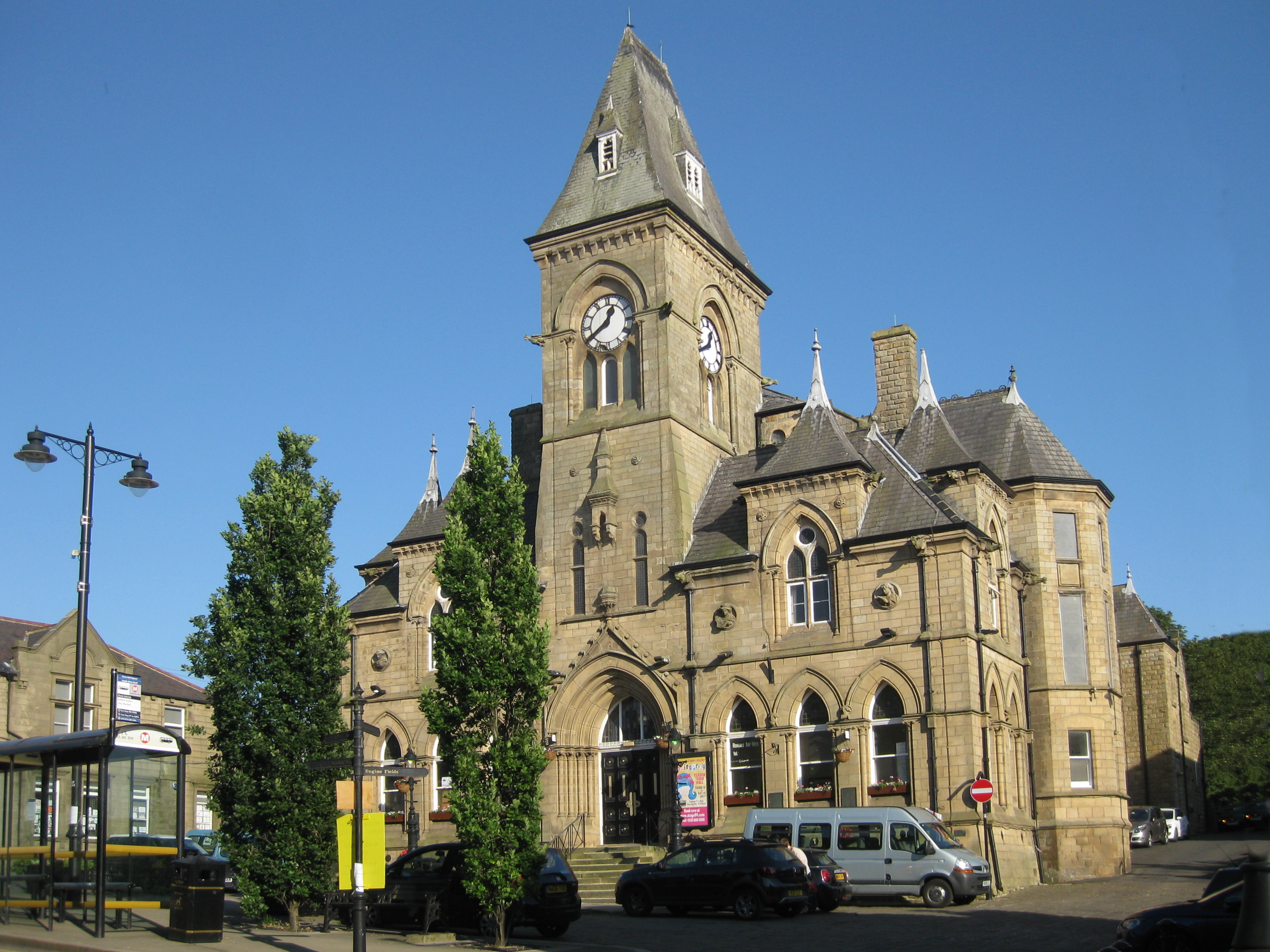
- Yeadon Town Hall in June 2018

- Shown in West Yorkshire
- 53°51′58″N 1°41′06″W
- Location: Yeadon

History
- Built: 1880

Site notes
- Architect: William Hill
- Architectural style: French Gothic
- Website: yeadontownhall.co.uk

Listed Building – Grade II
- Designated: 7 April 1988
- Reference no.: 1204098

Yeadon Town Hall is a municipal building in Yeadon, West Yorkshire, England. It is Grade II listed.

== History ==
In the early 19th century the local board of health held its meetings in the old school in what is now Town Hall Square. Meanwhile the local Mechanics Institute used the lecture hall on the High Street for its meetings. After both the old school and the lecture hall became inadequate for meetings, the local board and the Mechanics Institute decides to join together in an initiative to commission a proper town hall. The site selected had previously been owned by a cloth merchant, William Starkey.

Following a competition with more than 200 entries, and with a budget of £5,000, William Hill was chosen to design the building in the French Gothic style. The foundation stone for the new building was laid on 10 May 1879. It was built by the local builder, Richard Hogg, with two storeys and a two-stage clock tower at the centre of the main frontage. (Potts of Leeds supplied the large hour-striking clock for the tower; the clock and bell were paid for by Joseph and Ann Peate, of Nunroyd, Guiseley, to serve as a memorial to their twelve-year-old son who had died in December 1879.) Inside, the design featured offices on the ground floor and an assembly hall on the first floor. It was officially opened by the banker and politician, William Beckett-Denison, on 26 June 1880.

The town hall was the headquarters of Yeadon Urban District Council but ceased to be the local seat of government when the enlarged Aireborough Urban District Council was formed, with its headquarters at Micklefield House in Rawdon, in 1937. The town hall continued to be used as a public venue and concert performers included the contralto singer, Kathleen Ferrier, who made an appearance on 3 December 1944.

After Aireborough Urban District Council was abolished in 1972, responsibility for the management of the building was transferred to Leeds City Council in 1974. In 1980 the television producer, Barney Colehan, led a week of festivities to celebrate the centenary of the original opening of the building. The building was used as a registrar's office in the Yorkshire Television programme The Beiderbecke Tapes in 1985. The main assembly hall, which seats up to 500 people, was renovated in 1999.

On 1 April 2019, the management of the venue was taken over by local theatre producer, Jamie Hudson, who created a "Community Interest Company" in order to restore, refurbish and manage the building. Large portions of the building were refurbished and the theatre bar on the first floor was extensively restored. Following a public vote, the refurbished clock was given the name 'Peate's Clock' in memory of its original dedication. The town hall continues to host touring music and theatre shows although the highlight of the year is usually the Christmas Spectacular.

In February 2022, it was announced that Yeadon Town Hall would receive the old organ console from Leeds Town Hall, after a 24 hour process to digitally sample the old organ of Leeds Town Hall. It is hoped that the organ will be playing in Yeadon Town Hall by December 2022.

== See also ==
- Listed buildings in Guiseley and Rawdon
