= William Hill (English architect) =

English architect (1827–1889

- Born: 18 June 1827; Halifax, West Yorkshire, England
- Died: 5 January 1889 (aged 61); Adel, Leeds, West Yorkshire
- Occupation: Architect

William Hill (18 June 1827 – 5 January 1889) was an English architect who practised from offices in Leeds, West Yorkshire, England. He was a member of the Methodist New Connexion and designed a number of its churches. He is also noted for major civic work, most prominently Bolton Town Hall. His son, William Longfield Hill (1864–1929), succeeded him in the practice and later entered into partnership with Salmon L. Swann of Sheffield.

== Early life ==
William Hill was born in Halifax, West Yorkshire, and educated at the West Riding Propriety School, a Nonconformist school in Wakefield, also in West Yorkshire. Around 1843 he became a pupil in the Leeds architectural practice of Perkin and Backhouse, the town's most successful firm at the time. Hill opened his own office in June 1850 at 59 Albion Street, Leeds.

== Career and works ==
Hill's first recorded commission was in 1852, for a terrace of nine houses, and his work over the next five years remained at a similar, relatively modest level. At this time most architects traditionally confined their works to the area close to their office. Hill, however, went on to secure commissions for more substantial buildings, including projects in other parts of the country. Webster identifies two reasons for this: first, his willingness to enter competitions for buildings outside his immediate region; and second, his membership of the Methodist New Connexion. The latter movement arose from a schism within the Methodist Church and encouraged the use of architects who were themselves members of the denomination. From this source came commissions for chapels in Leeds, Leicester, Dewsbury, Sheffield, Stockport, Halifax, Birmingham, Durham, and Hanley. Further commissions followed from other Nonconformist denominations—the Wesleyan Methodists, the Congregationalists, the Unitarians, the Baptists, and the United Methodist Free Churches—and even from the Church of England. The architectural styles he employed for these chapels and churches included both Neoclassical and Gothic.

Hill's willingness to enter competitions further afield resulted in his gaining commissions for corn exchanges in Devizes, Wiltshire, Banbury, Oxfordshire, and Hertford, for which he produced broadly similar Neoclassical designs. He also entered competitions for new cemeteries, workhouses, town halls, poor law offices, Mechanics' Institutes, markets, and dispensaries. Following his success in some of these competitions, he went on to receive commissions for private houses as well.

Hill's major commissions were for two town halls. The first was Bolton Town Hall, for which he won the competition with a design that was a scaled-down version of Leeds Town Hall. He was awarded £120 (equivalent to £15,000 in 2023) for the design, which originally included no tower, although one was added later. During its construction, Hill was assisted by a local architect, George Woodhouse, but the design was entirely Hill's. The final cost of the town hall was £167,000 (equivalent to £18,690,000 in 2023), making it the most expensive town hall built up to that time.

Ten years later, the councillors of Portsmouth invited Hill to design a town hall in a similar style to Bolton's, but on a larger scale. His design for the building, now known as Portsmouth Guildhall, added ten domes at its corners to enliven the skyline. The architectural historian Nikolaus Pevsner described it as "one of the grandest gestures of municipal pride".

== Later life ==
Hill practised successively from three offices in Leeds and, in common with other architects, took in pupils. One of these was his son, William Longfield Hill (1864–1929), who succeeded him in the practice. In 1868 he entered into partnership with Salmon L. Swann of Sheffield. It was a loose arrangement: each continued to practise from his own office and, although some work was attributed to "Hill and Swann", most designs were produced independently. From 1874 Hill lived in The Heath, Adel, a house he designed for himself to the north of Leeds, where he died in 1889. His estate amounted to a little over £8,181 (equivalent to £1,110,000 in 2023). He was buried with his wife in the churchyard of St John, Adel. Their monument, by Hodgson of Leeds, has been designated a Grade II listed building.

== Notable extant works ==
=== Key ===
Grade	Criteria
Grade II*	Particularly important buildings of more than special interest.
Grade II	Buildings of special interest.

Name	Location	Photograph	Date	Notes	Grade
Methodist church	Leeds, West Yorkshire; 53.8017°N 1.5458°W	—	1857–58	Built for the Methodist New Connexion in Neoclassical style with Corinthian pilasters. Later used by Leeds Metropolitan University.	II
Corn Exchange and Public Hall	Hertford; 51.7965°N 0.0764°W		1857–1859	In Neoclassical style, the main front has pilasters, and the pediment contains a carving of the Hertfordshire hart and sacks of corn. It was altered in 1979–80 to provide shops on the ground floor and a hall and meeting rooms above.	II
Corn Exchange	Devizes, Wiltshire; 51.3523°N 1.9963°W		1857	In Neoclassical style, the main front has columns, an entablature and a central pedestal supporting a statue of the goddess, Ceres.	II
Cornhill Corn Exchange	Banbury, Oxfordshire; 52.0626°N 1.3359°W		1857	In Neoclassical style, the main front has columns, an entablature, a pediment and a central pedestal supporting a statue of the goddess, Ceres. The main structure was demolished in 1973 and the façade retained as an entrance to a shopping centre.	II
Methodist church and school	Andover Street, Sheffield, South Yorkshire; 53.3932°N 1.4639°W	—	1862	The school was built in 1862 followed by the church in 1865 for the Methodist New Connexion; later a Seventh Day Adventist church. Constructed in stone and in Gothic Revival style.	II
Public dispensary	Leeds, West Yorkshire; 53.8006°N 1.5398°W		1865	Built as a public dispensary, later used as a chest clinic. In red brick with stone dressings, and Italianate style.	II
Bolton Town Hall	Bolton, Greater Manchester; 53.5783°N 2.4319°W		1866–1873	Hill was assisted by George Woodhouse. It is in Neoclassical style with a six-column Corinthian portico, and a domed tower 200 feet (61 m) in height. The hall was extended in 1938.	II*
Bethesda Methodist Church	Elland, West Yorkshire; 53.6835°N 1.8406°W		1879–80	In Gothic Revival style, the main front includes a round-headed double doorway, and a four-light wheel window, flanked by pilasters rising to turrets with decorated pyramidal spires.	II
Yeadon Town Hall	Yeadon, West Yorkshire; 53.8657°N 1.6846°W		1879–80	It is in two storeys, with a frontage in French Gothic style. At the centre of the main front is a two-stage clock tower.	II
Meanwood Methodist Church	Meanwood, Leeds, West Yorkshire; 53.8281°N 1.5671°W		1881	Built in local sandstone and Potternewton stone, with slate roofs, it is in Gothic Revival style. The church was extended by Hill in 1886. The building is now used by the Iglesia ni Cristo church.	II
Portsmouth Guildhall	Portsmouth, Hampshire; 50.7977°N 1.0929°W		1886–1890	Built as the town hall, this is designed in Italianate Classical style. Damaged in the Second World War and largely rebuilt, but without some of its former decorative details. Its frontage has 17 bays and a large six-column Corinthian portico. (Note: The image shows the town hall as it was first built. Due to the bomb damage parts now look different, especially the top of the tower.)	II
