= Yeadon, West Yorkshire =

Town in West Yorkshire, England

Coordinates: 53.869°N 1.688°W

Yeadon
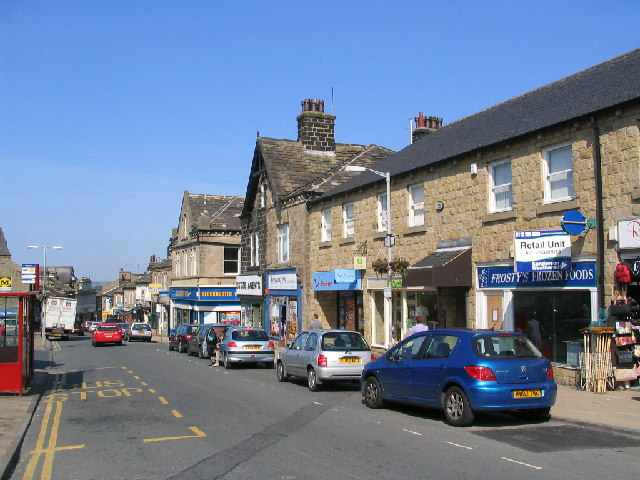
- High Street, Yeadon

- Location within West Yorkshire
- Population: 22,233 (Otley and Yeadon Ward, 2011 census)
- OS grid reference: SE219398
  - London: 205 miles (330 km)
- Metropolitan borough: City of Leeds
- Metropolitan county: West Yorkshire
- Region: Yorkshire and the Humber
- Country: England
- Sovereign state: United Kingdom
- Post town: LEEDS
- Postcode district: LS19
- Dialling code: 0113
- Police: West Yorkshire
- Fire: West Yorkshire
- Ambulance: Yorkshire
- UK Parliament: Leeds North West

Yeadon is a town within the metropolitan borough of the City of Leeds, West Yorkshire, England.

The town is in Leeds North West parliamentary constituency, most in Otley and Yeadon ward, with a southern part, north of Swincar Avenue on Kirk Lane and south of the A65 in Guiseley and Rawdon ward.

Leeds Bradford Airport is immediately east of the town.

== History ==
=== Early times ===
Yeadon's name comes from Old English gæh and dūn meaning steep hill, and the hilly part of the High Street has been known as "the Steep" for centuries. It was one of three hill settlements: Rawdon, Yeadon and Baildon, and it has been suggested that Rawdon was the main one, Yeadon being used for burial (there are burial urns nearby) and other religious purposes.

=== Medieval period ===
Yeadon was part of the Kingdom of Elmet until overrun by the Anglo-Saxons who transferred religion to Guiseley by building a church and divided Yeadon into two areas, Yeadon and Nether Yeadon, with Saxon lords (thegns). It remained divided until 1630. Following the Danish conquest of Yorkshire Yeadon was part of the Wapentake of Skyrack but still with Saxon lords.

After the Norman Conquest the two manors were taken from their Saxon lords and given to the House of Percy (present Yeadon village) and the Meschines family (Nether Yeadon). According to the Domesday Book it comprised four carucates or about 328 acres. Much of the area was later acquired by Bolton Priory and Kirkstall Abbey who exerted considerable power until the Dissolution of the Monasteries. In 1354 the villagers won a court case against Kirkstall Abbey over 300 acres of moorland between Yeadon Tarn (lake) and Horsforth, which now accommodates Leeds Bradford Airport.

In this period there were only thirty or so households scattered around three points: where the town centre is now; the main cluster round where the Woolpack is, and a smaller group of cottages further to the west along Yeadon Gill at Nether Yeadon, probably a marketplace. Sheep were farmed and the wool made into cloth locally. Yeadon Gill provided waterpower for a corn mill.

=== Later history ===
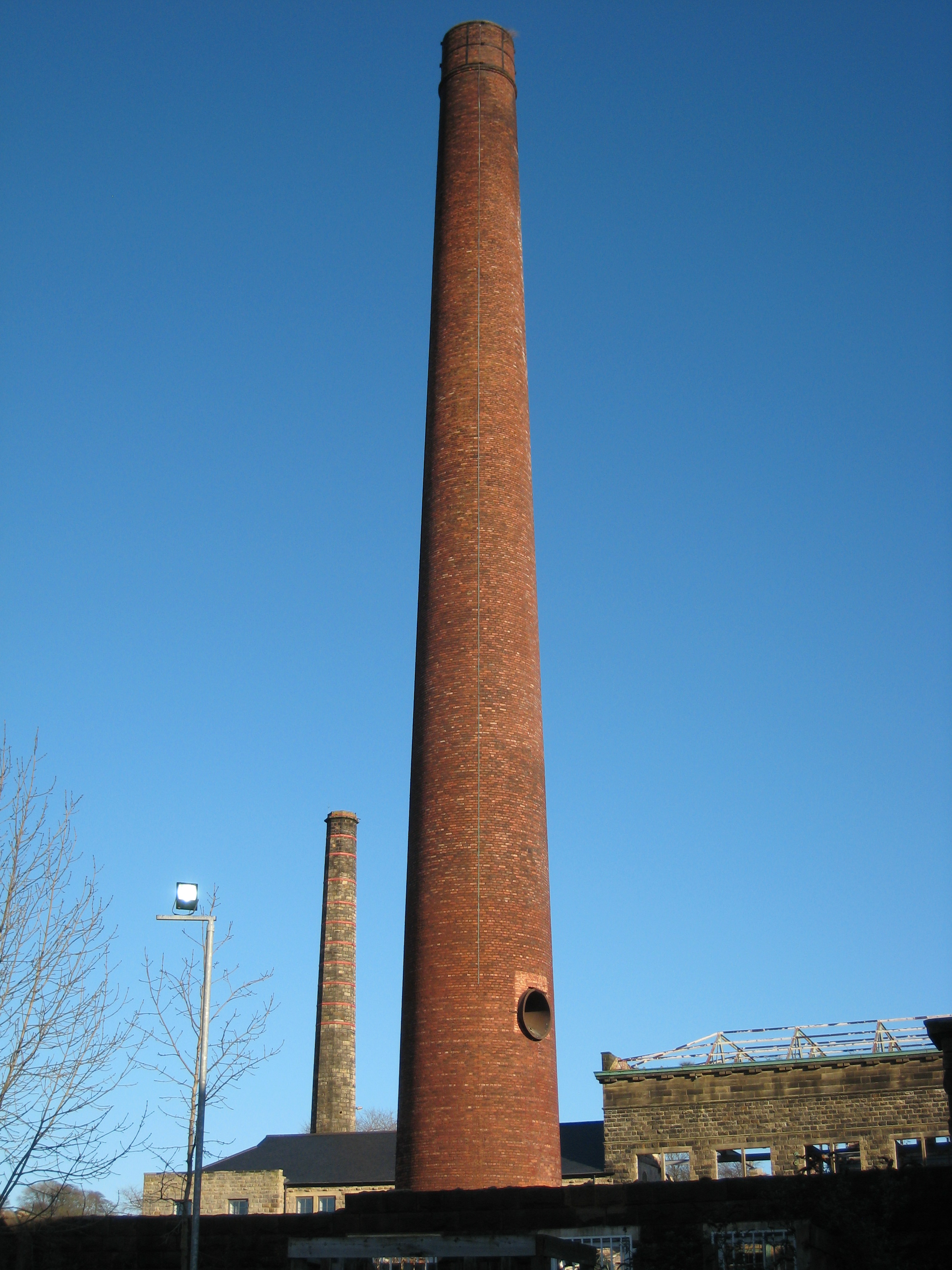
Former factory chimneys on Green Lane

Despite the English Civil War the area prospered and the population more than doubled to more than 400 during the 17th century, with 93 hearths (i.e. fireplace with chimney) recorded. Medieval parcels of land were traded into more efficient farms and a new mill was built. The town was no longer divided and had a significant social organization with poor relief and a constable.

The 18th century saw the establishment of a school (now Layton Cottage) and more stone houses were built replacing the wattle and daub cottages, a windmill and the first steam engine operated mill were built. The people worshipped at the parish church in Guiseley, some distance away, and started demanding their own church in 1714: but did not get one until 1844.

John Yeadon (1764–1833), a lay preacher in the town for more than thirty years, kept a journal about his life, family and events in the locality for most of his adult life. He and his wife, Mary had fourteen children, one of whom had a severe intellectual disability. John conducted services locally, but also in many villages and towns in the Aire and Wharfe Valleys. He attended services conducted by John Wesley, one of the founders of Methodism, many times. The handwritten journal provides detailed insights into town life and the early Methodist Church in the district.

In the 19th century, the population rose rapidly from 1,695 in 1801 to 4,109 in 1851 and 7,396 in 1891 as Yeadon became a manufacturing rather than farming town. It was particularly noted for making women's apparel. To assist trade, New Road (now A65) was built in 1827 through Yeadon, linking Kirkstall with Guiseley and the railway followed in the 1840s. In 1845 it was administratively separated from Guiseley. By 1853 it had gas from the "Yeadon and Guiseley Gas Light Co". The watercourse became badly polluted by effluent from Bradford, Shipley and Bingley, leading to a successful court case against the Bradford Corporation in 1868. The Yeadon Waterworks sank a well in 1861 and began the Cold Harbour Reservoir in 1877. The town's Board of Health was established in 1863, and set up the cemetery and buildings in 1876. In 1880 the town had its own "Yeadon Town Hall and Mechanics' Institute".

=== 20th century onwards ===
Increasing social unrest and labour disputes in the early 20th century led to a major lockout and subsequent hunger marches in 1913. As a result of the dispute, the working week in the textile mills was shortened, and workers received a pay rise, although this fell short of the demands of the trade unions who in consequence streamlined their organisation. In 1937 it became part of the Aireborough district, being the most populous township of over ten thousand.

== Geography ==
The main part of the town is on a hill with a south facing slope towards the Aire valley. It is bounded by the A65 road to the southwest and the A658 road to the southeast. South of the junction of these roads are Nether Yeadon and Little London. To the west of the A65 is New Scarborough, containing many 19th century houses. A public park, Nunroyd Park, to the northwest provides a green break between the housing of Yeadon and Guiseley. This was formerly the house and lands of a mill owner, and before that the parkland belonging to a nunnery, royd meaning a woodland clearing.

Evidence of the medieval settlement is seen in fields to the north in Yeadon Banks which follow the strips of this time, and in the irregular and organic location of buildings around Town Street and Ivegate, described in 1878, as "a bewildering labyrinth of yards and courts and intricate lanes". By contrast the 19th century development produced a regular grid of terraced houses, many of which remain, while the pattern of streets remains for those that have gone. There are also a number of former mill and dyeworks sites.

The geology is sandstone and millstone grit, which has been extensively quarried and used for buildings, and impervious shale and clay to the north, which allowed the formation of a natural hilltop lake, Yeadon Tarn, which was enlarged for industrial use. Leeds Bradford Airport occupies the high plateau of Yeadon Moor to the east. In chronostratigraphy, the term Yeadonian—for a British sub-stage of the Carboniferous period—is derived from the study of a geological site at the brick and tile works in Yeadon.

== Public transport ==
Yeadon had a rail connection from Guiseley that opened in 1894. The line was closed in 1964. It is now a nature path and most of its length can still be walked, from the Old Engine Fields, off Henshaw Lane, past Guiseley retail park where it joined the Guiseley Branch Line. The line continued over Henshaw Lane where an old bridge can still be seen. Immediately after the bridge was the railway station, near the Station Inn in the (now) council storage yard. The line terminated opposite Trinity Church (previously Benton Congregational Church) in Rawdon. Yeadon Station was mostly used for goods, and the line served several large mills directly along its route (Leafield Mill, Kirk Lane Mill, Westfield Mill, Green Lane Mill, a soap works and a dye works). The only passenger trains were special services. The first train to leave Yeadon Station in 1905 held 500 people. The following year, trains took passengers from Yeadon to Blackpool. The nearest railway station is at Guiseley, 1-mile (1.6 km) to the north-west.

Yeadon (Green Lane) was connected by tram to Leeds from 1909 until the 1950s. Northbound, Yeadon is served by bus route A2 to Harrogate, 33, 34 and 27 to Otley and Guiseley respectively, and the 966 to Guiseley. Southbound, the town is served by the A2 to Bradford via Greengates, the A3 to Bradford via Shipley, 33, 34 and 27 to Leeds

== Religion ==
Yeadon was part of the old, large Guiseley Parish but a church, St John the Evangelist Church, was built in 1844 as a Commissioners' church with a grant of £300. It was designed by Walker Rawsthorne. Its tower was demolished as unsafe in 1970. The New Life Community Church was formerly St Andrew's Parish Church (C of E), built by Thomas Healey of Bradford in 1891 and is Grade II listed. There is a Roman Catholic church (St Peter and St Paul), a Methodist church developed from a Primitive Methodist Chapel, and a meeting hall for members of the Plymouth Brethren Christian Church.

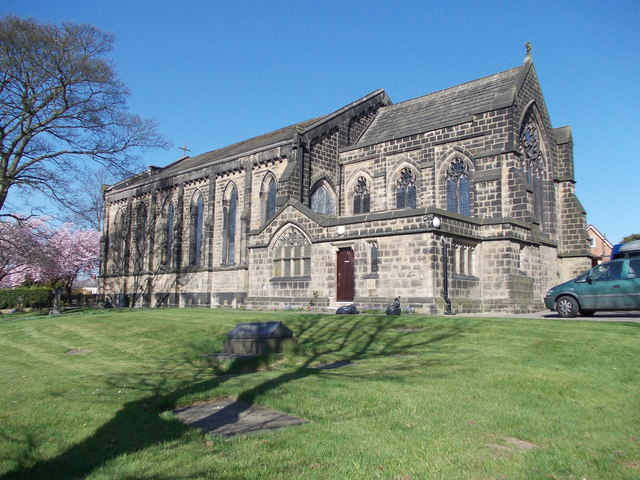
St John the Evangelist Church

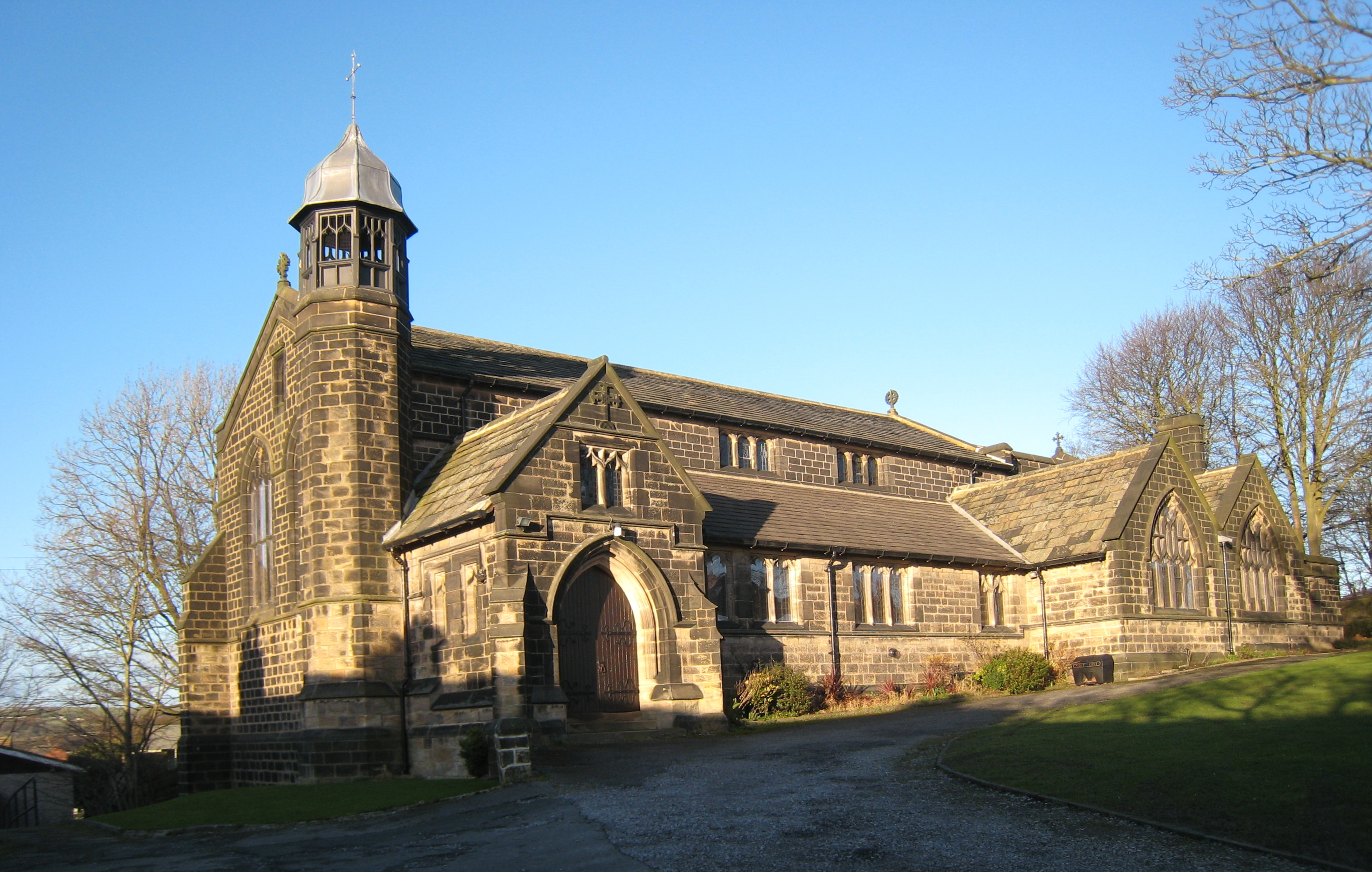
New Life Community Church

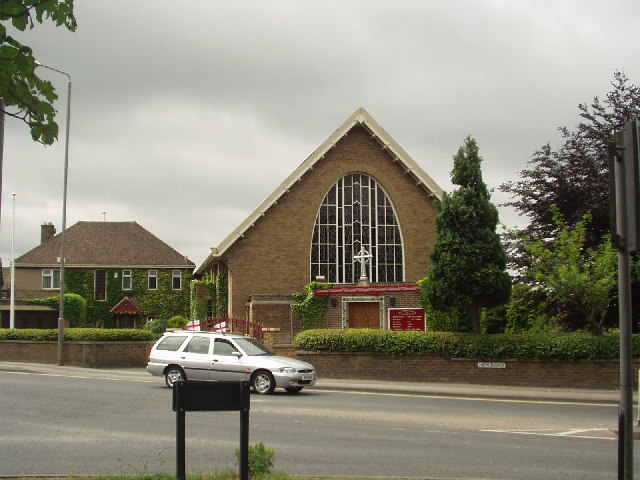
St Peter & St Paul Church

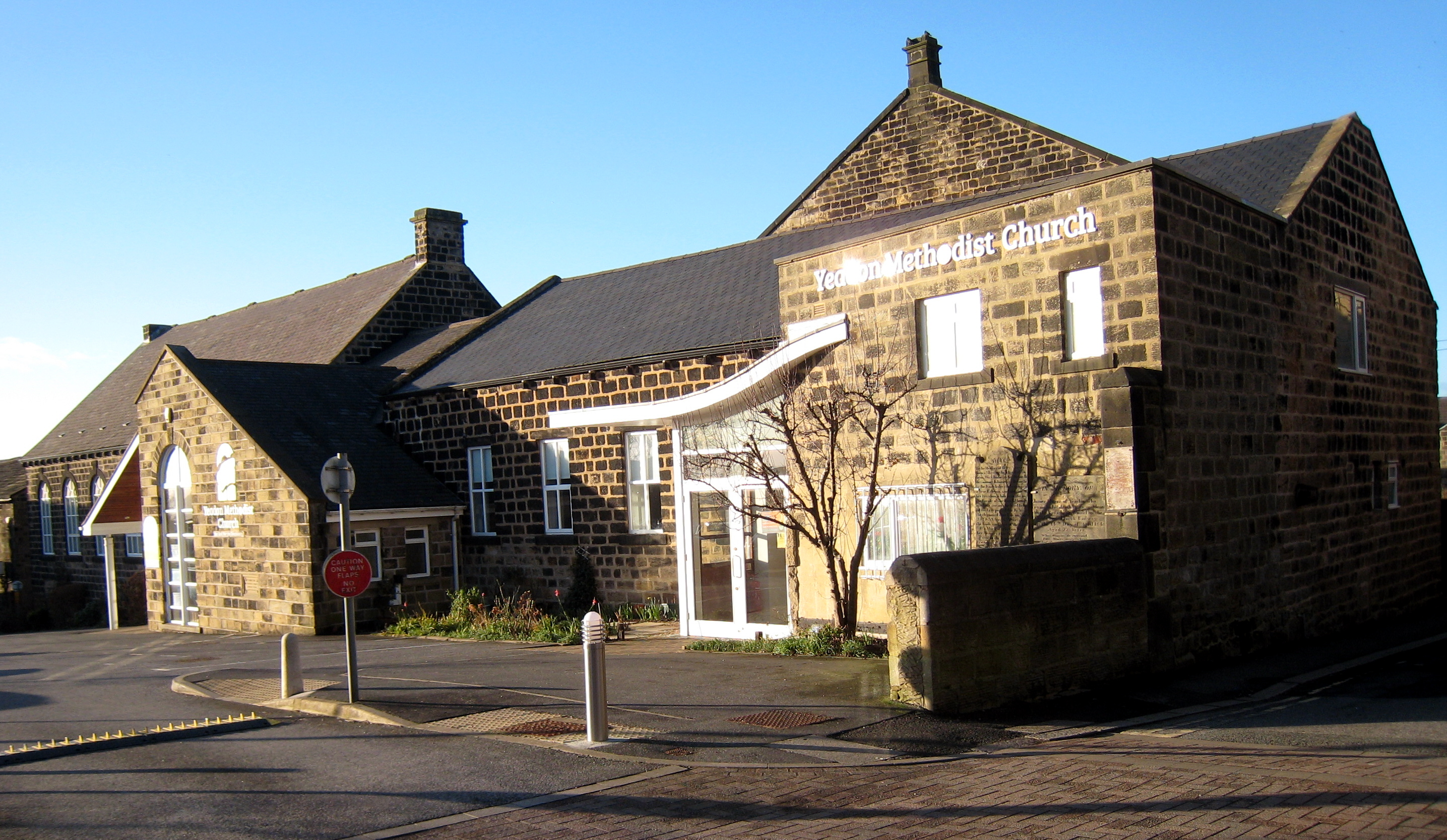
Methodist Church

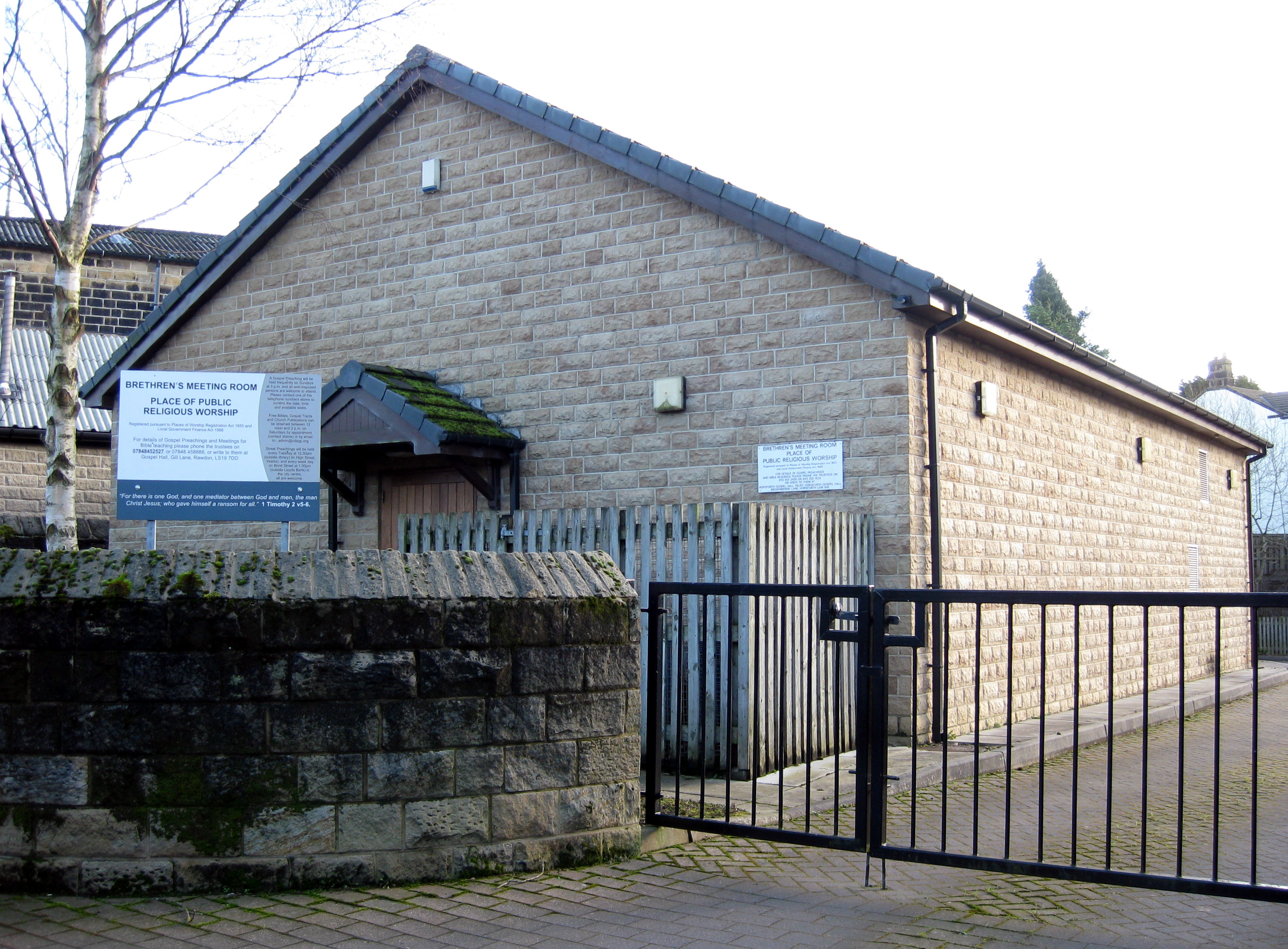
Brethren's Meeting Hall

== Notable features ==
=== Town Hall ===
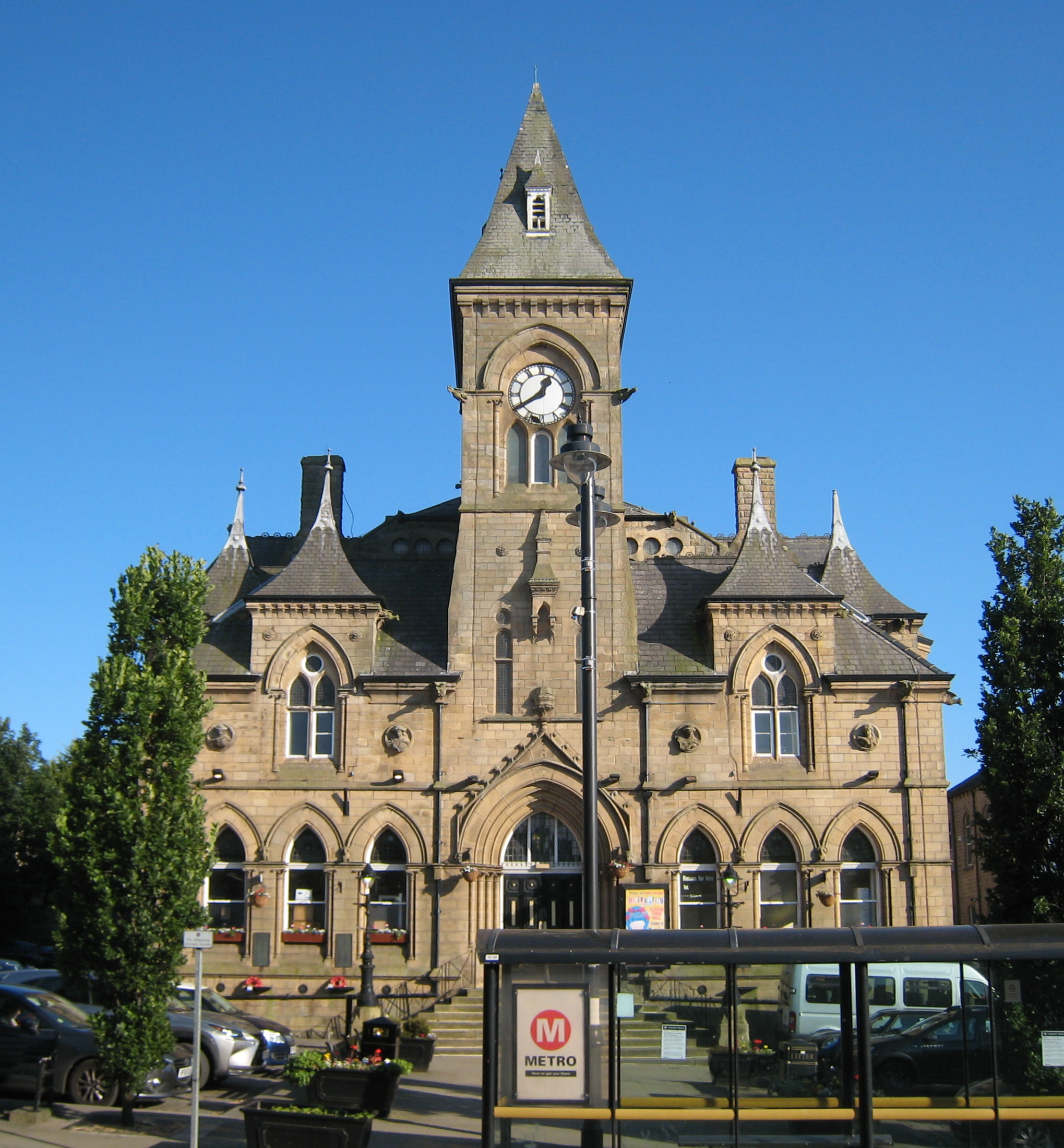
Yeadon Town Hall

Facing north on Town Hall Square by the High Street, the Yeadon Town Hall and Mechanics' Institute of 1880 was designed by William Hill of Leeds. It is a Grade II listed building of coursed dressed sandstone, with slate roofs in French Gothic style, with a central tower with a clock. The architect was selected after a competition with more than 200 entries, with a budget of £5,000. The stonemason was Richard Hogg of Rawdon.

The building was used as a registrar's office in the Yorkshire Television programme The Beiderbecke Tapes in 1985.

=== Low Hall ===
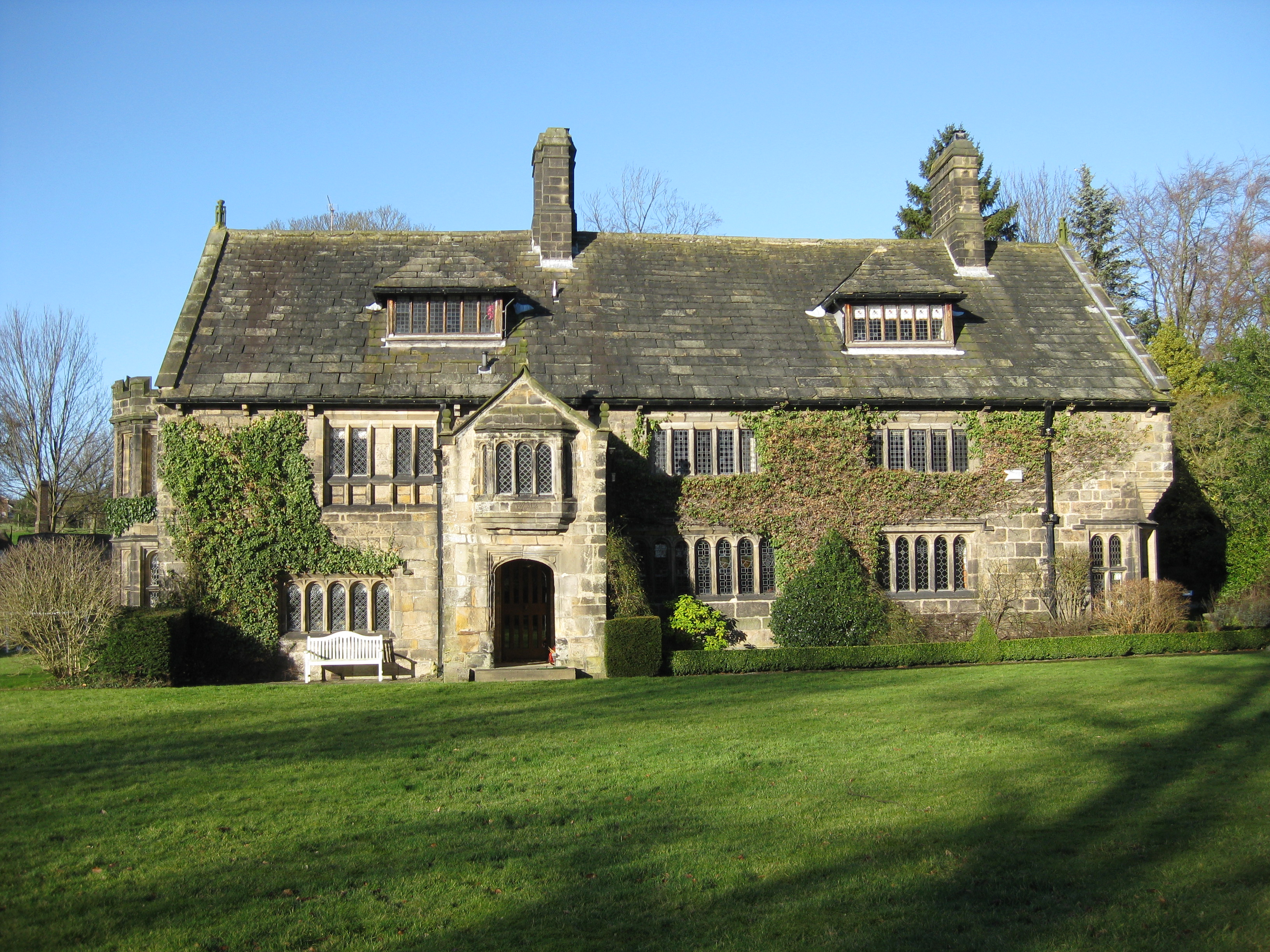
Low Hall

Arthur Mee wrote "Though Yorkshire has many greater houses, it has few more charming than Low Hall on the fringe of Yeadon." It is a Grade II listed building on Gill Lane, a former 17th century farmhouse (with a datestone "W S 1658"), remodelled in the 19th century, of coursed sandstone and slate roof. It was built in 1624, and has a porch added by William Sale in 1658, the stone believed to be taken from Esholt Priory following the Dissolution of the Monasteries. It contains a Tudor priest hole.

=== Yeadon Tarn ===
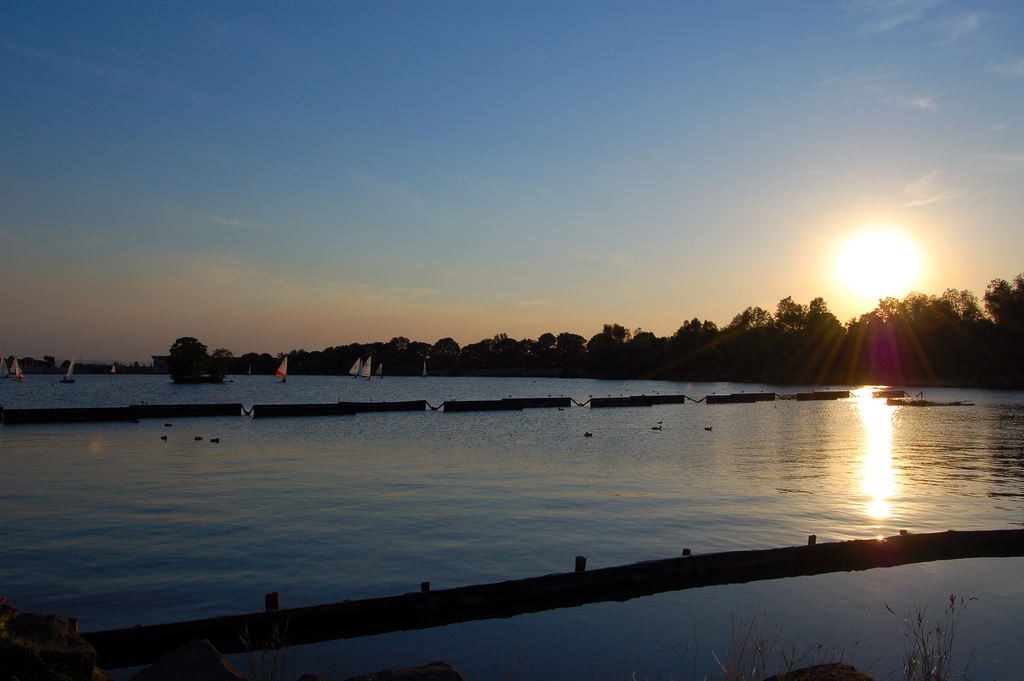
Yeadon Tarn

Yeadon Tarn, also known as Yeadon Dam, between High Street and the airport runway was drained during the Second World War to prevent enemy aircraft using its reflection as a landmark to identify the nearby Avro factory. The tarn is used for sailing and fishing. Mallard ducks, swans and a sizable population of Canada geese can be found at the tarn. Adjacent to the tarn is a park of 17 acres (6.9 ha) with a BMX bike track, known as Tarnfield Park.

== Governance ==
Yeadon was formerly a township and chapelry, in 1866 Yeadon became a separate civil parish, in 1894 Yeadon became an urban district, on 1 April 1937 the district was abolished to form Aireborough, part also went to the County Borough of Bradford. On 1 April 1937 the parish was abolished to form Aireborough, part also went to Idle. In 1931 the parish had a population of 7,672.

Yeadon, along with neighbouring towns Guiseley and Rawdon formed part of Aireborough Urban District from 1937 to 1974. Yeadon still hosts local Rugby Union side Aireborough RUFC at Nunroyd Park. Yeadon (except for the area north of Swincar Avenue on Kirk Lane, and the area south of the A65) is now in the Leeds City Council Ward of Otley and Yeadon ward. It is represented by three councillors. Leeds City Council now control the public services in Yeadon. Yeadon falls into Leeds North West constituency, which is held by the Labour Party, represented by Katie White.

== Amenities ==
Yeadon has a developed town centre and most of the businesses are situated around the High Street. There is a supermarket and several other chain shops. There are also building societies, estate agents and public houses. Hotels are situated near the airport. In Town Hall Square there is a public library which is part of Leeds City Council's library network. It also operates as a council One Stop Centre.

== Sports ==
Cricket has been played in Yeadon at least since around 1850 when scores of people were reported to play on Yeadon Moor after work ended on a Saturday teatime. Play continued as long as the light would allow. The origins of cricket in Yeadon are not definitely known, but at that time Yeadon boasted two teams, Topenders and Lowenders. The teams decided to amalgamate at a meeting held in the Old Victoria Hotel, at the junction of Sandy Way and the Green in 1859. The club adopted the name Yeadon United Cricket Club, ‘united’ was dropped soon afterwards.

The legendary W. G. Grace played at the Swan ground in 1877 with a United South XI. Grace was bowled for nought by an elated bowler who was then admonished by his captain for removing the man the crowd had paid to see.

Yeadon Cricket Club plays in the Bradford Premier League with their 1XI in Division One and the 2XI in Division One (2nds) and the 3XI play in the Mid Yorkshire Sunday Cricket League, Championship after winning their Section in 2023.

Yeadon FC won promotion to the FA's Wharfedale Triangle Premier League in the 2018–19 season.

== Economy ==
The Avro factory next to Leeds Bradford Airport from 1938 to 1946 produced many of the company's wartime planes, including the Lancaster, Lincoln, York and Anson. Several different variants of Lancasters were produced at Yeadon, with a final tally of 695.

Aviation heritage in Yeadon is kept alive by the activities of 2168 (Yeadon) Squadron Air Training Corps.

The national charity Epilepsy Action has its headquarters in the town.

== Notable residents ==
- Betsy Sawyer, who was born enslaved in Antigua, died in Yeadon on 24 November 1839. A memorial stone was placed in Yeadon Methodist Churchyard after her death to remember her journey to freedom and her life.
- The former Yorkshire and England cricket captain Brian Close lived in the town during his childhood.
- Moses Ayrton (1878–1950), a New Zealand Methodist minister and socialist, was born in Yeadon.

== See also ==
- Listed buildings in Yeadon, West Yorkshire
- Listed buildings in Guiseley and Rawdon
