= Rawdon, West Yorkshire =

Village and civil parish in West Yorkshire, England

Coordinates: 53.8493°N 1.6766°W

Rawdon
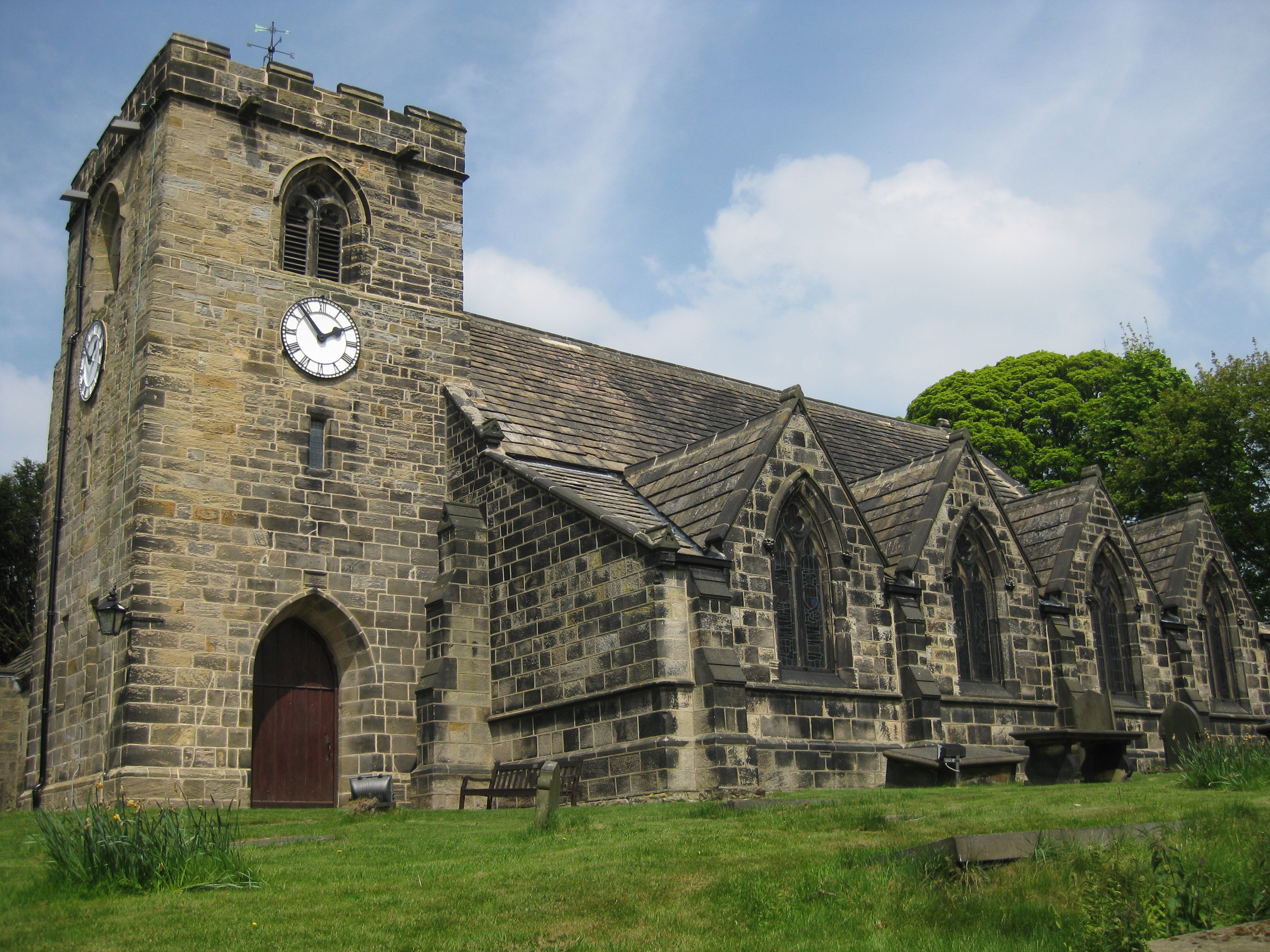
- St Peter's Church, Rawdon

- Location within West Yorkshire
- OS grid reference: SE421439
- Civil parish: Rawdon
- Metropolitan borough: City of Leeds
- Metropolitan county: West Yorkshire
- Region: Yorkshire and the Humber
- Country: England
- Sovereign state: United Kingdom
- Post town: LEEDS
- Postcode district: LS19
- Dialling code: 0113
- Police: West Yorkshire
- Fire: West Yorkshire
- Ambulance: Yorkshire
- UK Parliament: Leeds North West

Rawdon is a village and civil parish in the metropolitan borough of the City of Leeds, West Yorkshire, England. It sits on the River Aire and on the A65 south of Yeadon. The village is 7 miles (11 km) north-west of Leeds city centre.

The northern parts of the village are part of the Guiseley and Rawdon ward of Leeds City Council and the southern part is in the Horsforth ward. The whole village is included in the Leeds North West parliamentary constituency.

== History ==
The name comes from Old Norse rauðr meaning red, and Old English dūn meaning hill.

While no documentary reference has been made to Rawdon before the Domesday Book was composed in 1086, the area had seen human activity at least as early as in the Bronze Age, as evidenced by archeological finds of bronze axe heads and a gold torc. In the Domesday Book Rawdon (also spelt Roudun, Rowdun and Rowdon) is mentioned as terra regis (belonging to the King) with five taxable landholders, one of them Norman and the others Saxon, and approximately between 500 and 700 acres of pasture and 80 to 200 acres of arable land.

Paul (or Paulyn) de Rawdon, a commander of archers under William the Conqueror was awarded lands in Rawdon for his faithful and courageous service to the Normans, a portion of which was the manor on Rawden Hill, in 1069. He took his surname after his new possessions, meaning he became known as Paulyn of Rawden Hill Manor. For the following four centuries his descendants lived at or near to the house now known as Layton Hall, opposite the present churchyard, and on several occasions presented land to Bolton Priory, Kirkstall Abbey, and (once) to Esholt Nunnery.

After the dissolution of the monasteries the greater part of Rawdon passed to the Crown and shortly thereafter to Henry Clifford, second Earl of Cumberland, who died without issue in 1570. Afterwards, the lands changed owners several times until two thirds of the Manor of Rawdon, all the Manor of Yeadon and two fifths of the Manor of Horsforth had been acquired by Francis Layton, a great nephew of Richard Layton, Dean of York, and later Yeoman of the Jewel House to Charles I. For his support of the king in the English Civil War he was imprisoned in 1645 and heavily fined. He lived in the old family home of the Rawdons, which has since been called Leyton Hall. The Leyton estate remained in the hands of the family until 1718 when it was split up, and after various quarrels it was reunited in the hands of the Emmott family (later known as the Green-Emmott or the Green-Emmott-Rawdon family) who let out leyton Hall whole or in part for a long time during their ownership. Col. Charles Payne Barras, agent of the family in the 1860s, founded brick and tile works to use the abundant local clay.

George Rawdon, a descendant of the Rawdon family and brother of Ann Paslew, had a new hall built in Cliffe Lane, known as Rawdon Low Hall in the past and now as Rawdon Hall. According to a date stone it appears to have been completed in 1625. George Rawdon became secretary and agent of Edward, 1st Viscount Conway, and served in Ireland following the Catholic rebellion in Ulster in 1641. He left the management of his estates in the hands of his son-in-law, John Stanhope II of Horsforth.

Rawdon was a civil parish from 1866 to 1 April 1937, when it was merged into Horsforth parish. Rawdon became a civil parish again on 15 October 2012.

== Areas of interest ==
Rawdon Billing is a hill and well known local landmark that can be seen from a considerable distance. It is a popular area for walking and provides views of Rawdon from the top.

=== Little London ===
The village of Little London with its extensive conservation area lies in the westernmost part of Rawdon, about 1 mile (1.5 km) south of the centre of Guiseley. It is unique in that the historic area covered by the designation straddles the boundary of the cities of Leeds and Bradford. Until the local government reorganisation in 1974 this area was part of a district called Aireborough which was subsequently divided between Leeds and Bradford.

The portion of the conservation area lying in the City of Leeds was designated in 1975 and was extended in 1988. The portion of the conservation area lying in the City of Bradford was designated in 1977. The Bradford designation centres on Lane Head House, built for the steward of Esholt Hall Estate c. 1710–1720, with its associated cottages, and outbuildings and other mainly late 18th century development.

=== Cragg Wood ===
Rawdon Cragg Wood conservation area, is an exclusive rural suburb of Victorian villas with special architectural interest set in spacious wooded grounds developed in the second half of the 19th century, for the wealthy wool and cloth merchants of Leeds and Bradford.

“The ‘old nobility’ may have gone, perhaps for ever, but in their stead has arisen a race of self made nobles, born of trade and commerce, whose pretty villas or castellated towers stud the hillside or nestle in the wood, to the undoubted advantage of the landscape".

== Schools ==
Nether Yeadon School near the junction of Apperley Lane and Warm Lane was a joint Quaker/Baptist effort on land provided by the Laytons for a peppercorn rent in 1703. It was rebuilt in 1821 and sold in 1905 as a private residence, now known as Layton Cottage.

Thomas Layton had St. Peter's Church School built in 1710 as a school for boys at the junction of Layton Avenue and Town Street. A church school for girls and infants was built in Town Street in 1861 and extended in 1876 with two classrooms for boys, together with a master's house. The school, but not the house, was burnt down in 1951. It was rebuilt and reopened in 1965 and extended with an infants department in 1976, and the master's house is now occupied by the caretaker. The old building erected under Thomas Layton (‘The Institute’) was used for parochial purposes from 1876 to 1979 and then turned into a private house. The school is still active as Rawdon St Peters C of E Primary School.

Woodhouse Grove School was established on an estate purchased by the Wesleyans in 1811 who had the existing house and folly of Robert Elam, a prominent Leeds Quaker, converted and furnished. It opened in 1812 as a school for the sons of Wesleyan ministers, and from 1882 it also admitted the sons of laymen.

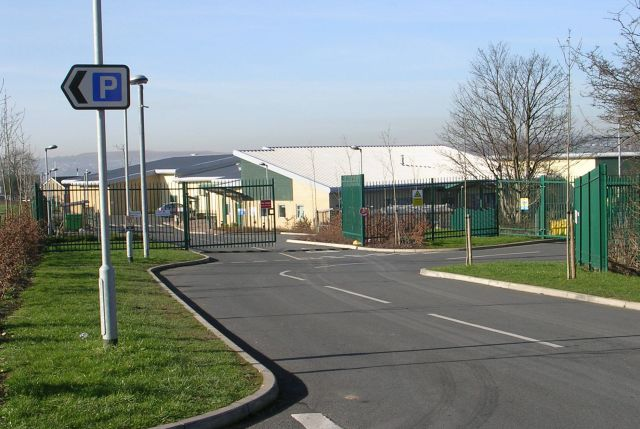
New buildings of Littlemoor Primary School

Further schools in the area include the Friends School at Low Green which operated from 1832 until 1921 and whose buildings now serve as a light industrial estate, The Rev. Anthony Ibbotson's Seminary, run 1823-1858 by the local minister, the Baptist Ministerial Training College in a Victorian Gothic building on Woodlands Drive which opened in 1859 and closed in the 1970s, and Little London School in Micklefield Lane, built in 1846 in a vernacular Tudor style, which was also used by the Baptists as a Sunday School until their own was built in 1884 and also as a Mechanics Institute until a building in Leeds Road was acquired. From 1920 on it served as an infants school and closed in 1960. Being used for some years for storage purposes, it was converted into flats (1980). Littlemoor Primary School in quasi-ecclesiastical style with a bell turret opened in 1879 at the junction of Harrogate Road and Batter Lane. It closed in 2005 and is converted into housing. Rawdon Littlemoor Primary School now uses a new building.

Brontë House School was opened as a preparatory department for Woodhouse Grove in May 1934 by the Methodists who had acquired the Ashdown estate. Its pre-preparatory department Ashdown Lodge was opened in 1993 in the grounds and preserves the old name.

Benton Park School, the local secondary school on Harrogate Road, was established on grounds acquired by Joseph Riley, who with his son John ran a school for boys there from 1838. Between 1951 and 1957 it was used as a senior school for Littlemoor in the tripartite system according to the Education Act of 1944. The old building was demolished and the new one opened in 1960, and a second again in 2022. It is used as a fictional location in the soap opera Emmerdale.

== Religion ==
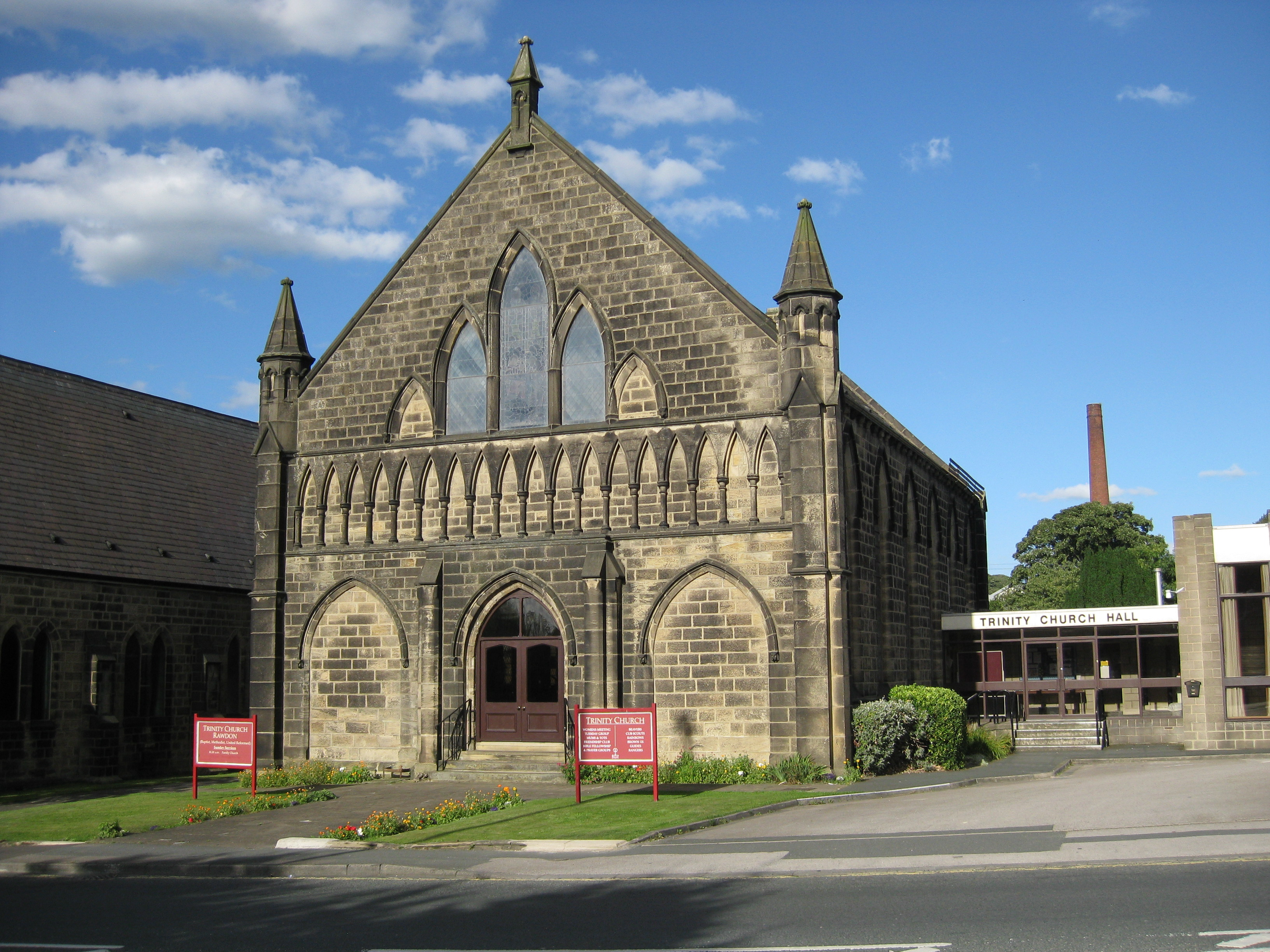
Trinity Church

Rawdon is home to St Peter's Church which was built by Francis Layton as a chapel of ease for the parish of Guiseley in 1645. Due to the troubled times (English Civil War 1642–1651, then Cromwell's Commonwealth until the Restoration of the Monarchy in 1660) it took many years to erect the church. Francis Layton died in 1661, leaving his son Henry to continue with the building. It was finally consecrated in 1684. A tower was added in 1707. The church was largely rebuilt in 1864 by architect Alexander Crawford at a cost of £1,200.

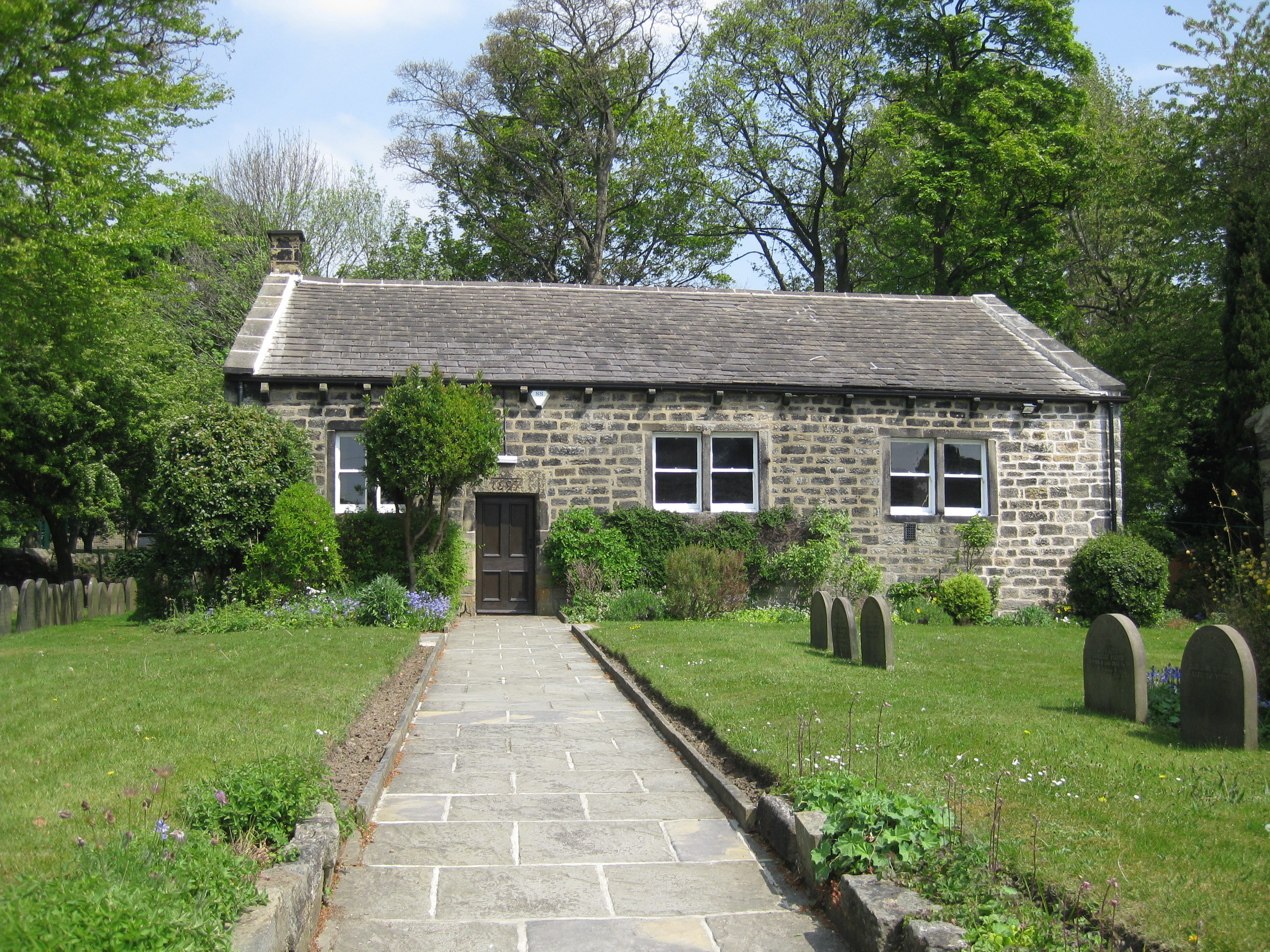
Friends Meeting House of 1697

Rawdon is also home to a Quaker meeting house built in 1697, and the Trinity Church (Baptist, Methodist, United Reform). This is housed in the former Benton Congregational Church (1846), being renamed in 1972 by the three groups who now share it. It was home to Rawdon College, a Baptist missionary training institution that opened in 1859 and closed in 1961.

== Notable residents ==
- David Stone- 2012 Paralympic cycling gold medal winner (https://en.wikipedia.org/wiki/2012_Summer_Olympics_and_Paralympics_gold_post_boxes#List_of_gold_postboxes)
- Brian Close — cricketer
- Hedley Verity — cricketer
- William Thompson — merchant; imported Australian wool (in 1808)

== See also ==
- Listed buildings in Guiseley and Rawdon
