= Magic Bus (Stagecoach) =

Brand of buses operated by Stagecoach

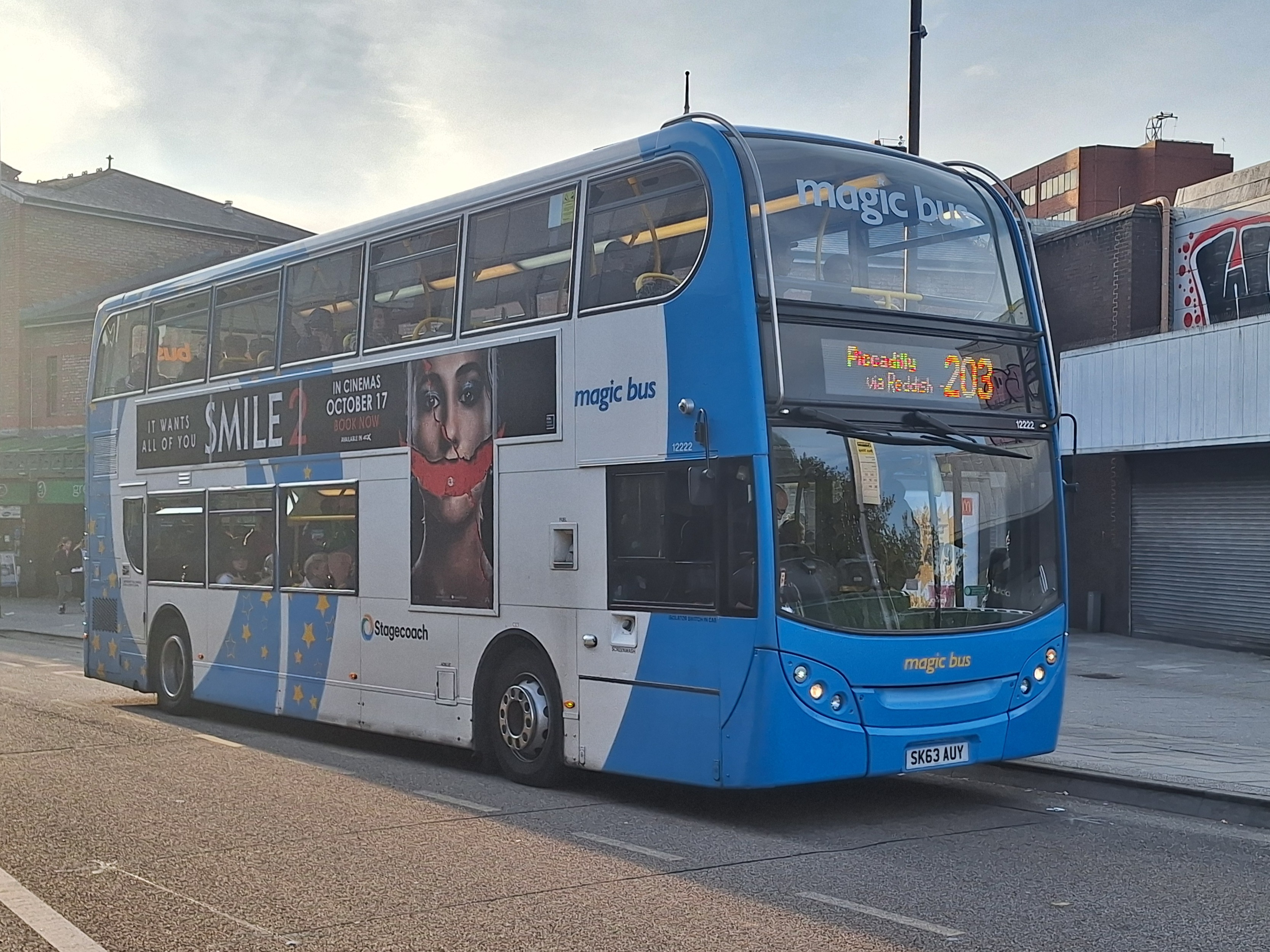
- Stagecoach Manchester Magic Bus branded Alexander Dennis Enviro400H in Stockport in October 2024
- Parent: Stagecoach
- Founded: 1986; 40 years ago
- Defunct: 5 January 2025; 13 months ago
- Locale: Manchester
- Hubs: Manchester Piccadilly Gardens bus station Wilmslow Road bus corridor
- Fleet: Alexander Dennis Enviro400; Alexander Dennis Enviro400H
- Operator: Stagecoach Manchester

Magic Bus was a brand of the Stagecoach Group for local bus operations in the United Kingdom, usually operated on routes with strong competition from other operators. Until the rollout of the Bee Network, the brand was most commonly used in Manchester, though in the past, it was also employed in Glasgow, Newcastle, Liverpool, and Rotherham. A similar brand, named Magic Mini, was also used for minibus services in Corby, Ayrshire and the Scottish Highlands.

== History ==
=== Glasgow ===
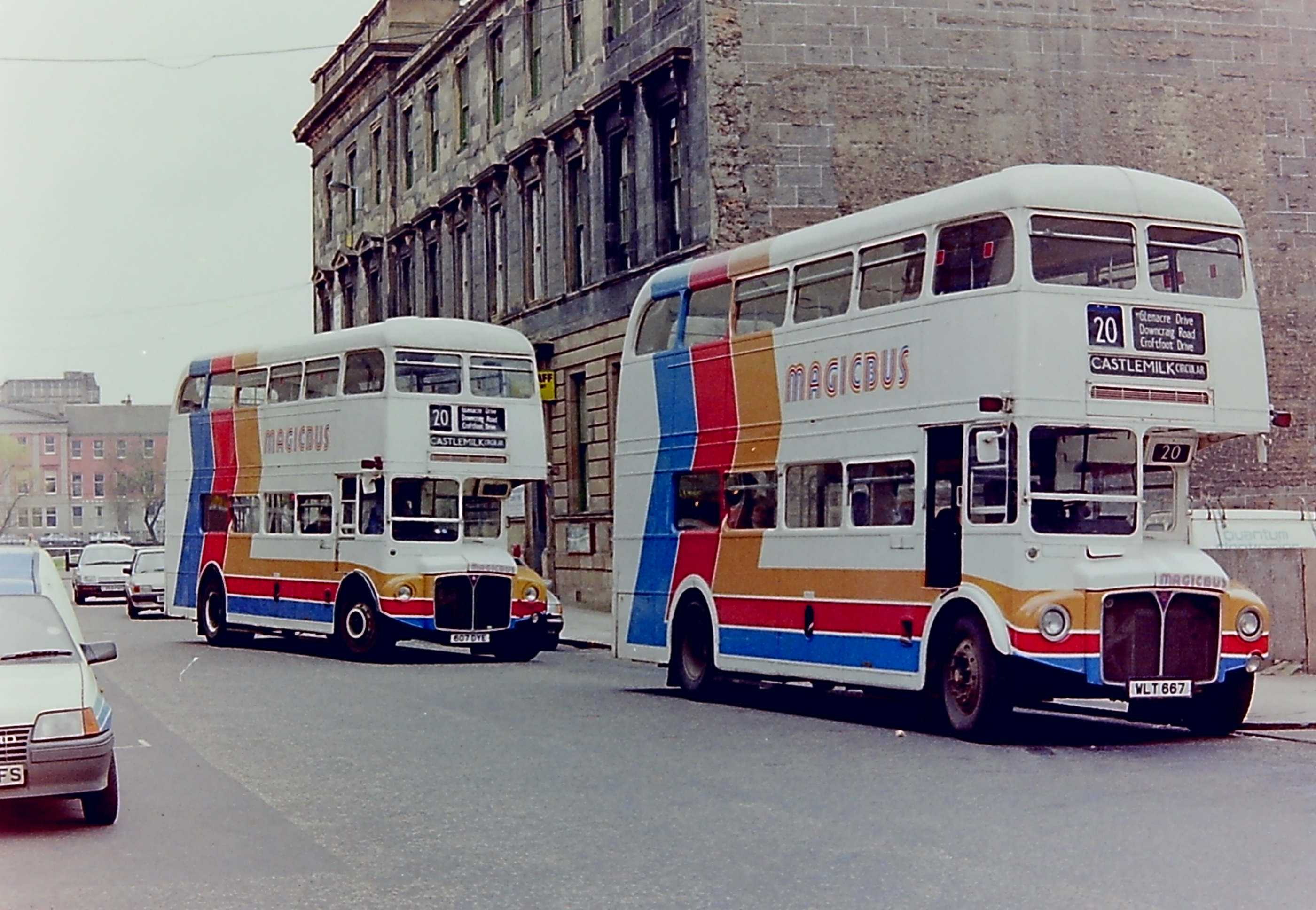
Magicbus AEC Routemasters in Glasgow in April 1987

The Magic Bus name was first introduced in Glasgow following the deregulation of the bus industry on 26 October 1986. A new company founded by Brian Souter named Magicbus (Scotland) Ltd, running from a depot in Port Dundas, began operating ex-London Transport AEC Routemasters on a route running from St Enoch Square to Castlemilk, although Magicbus were made to use nearby Dixon Street instead of the St Enoch Square terminus due to its access being blocked by Strathclyde Buses inspectors. Services 18 and 19 to East Kilbride and Easterhouse respectively commenced from Buchanan bus station a day later, with the route being marketed by a bunny mascot handing out free pens, mugs and sticks of rock.

Magicbus withdrew East Kilbride service 18 in January 1987 while consecutively doubling the frequency of buses on Easterhouse route 19 to further increase competition with rival operators Strathclyde Buses and Kelvin Central Buses. Eventually, route 19 was extended to run from Easterhouse to Milton via Buchanan bus station to a frequency of ten minutes, and the following November, Magicbus commenced operations of service 25, running from St Enoch Square to Castlemilk via Victoria Road in direct competition with Strathclyde Buses' own service 5. Services subsidised by Glasgow City Council that ran from Glasgow city centre to Allander Toll and Kirkintilloch were also tendered to Magicbus in February 1988, and an express coach service, branded 'Londonlink' and running to London King's Cross railway station, was briefly operated in competition with rival independent Bruce of Airdrie.

Magicbus (Scotland) Ltd was merged into a new company, Stagecoach Scotland Ltd, on 5 March 1991, and run as the company's Strathclyde Region subsidiary. In April 1992, this operation was sold to Kelvin Central Buses, with Stagecoach divesting the operation to position itself for a bid to buy Strathclyde Buses. As part of the deal, Kelvin gained the rights to use the Magicbus brand for up to three years as well as Stagecoach's 'Stripes' livery for a shorter period.

The Magic Bus brand was reintroduced to Glasgow by Stagecoach West Scotland in 2002 amid a bus war with First Glasgow. Making use of conventional rear-engined buses in an all-over blue livery, at its peak, the brand was used on three routes serving Baillieston and Castlemilk; one was withdrawn in 2005, with the remainder following in 2006.

=== Manchester ===
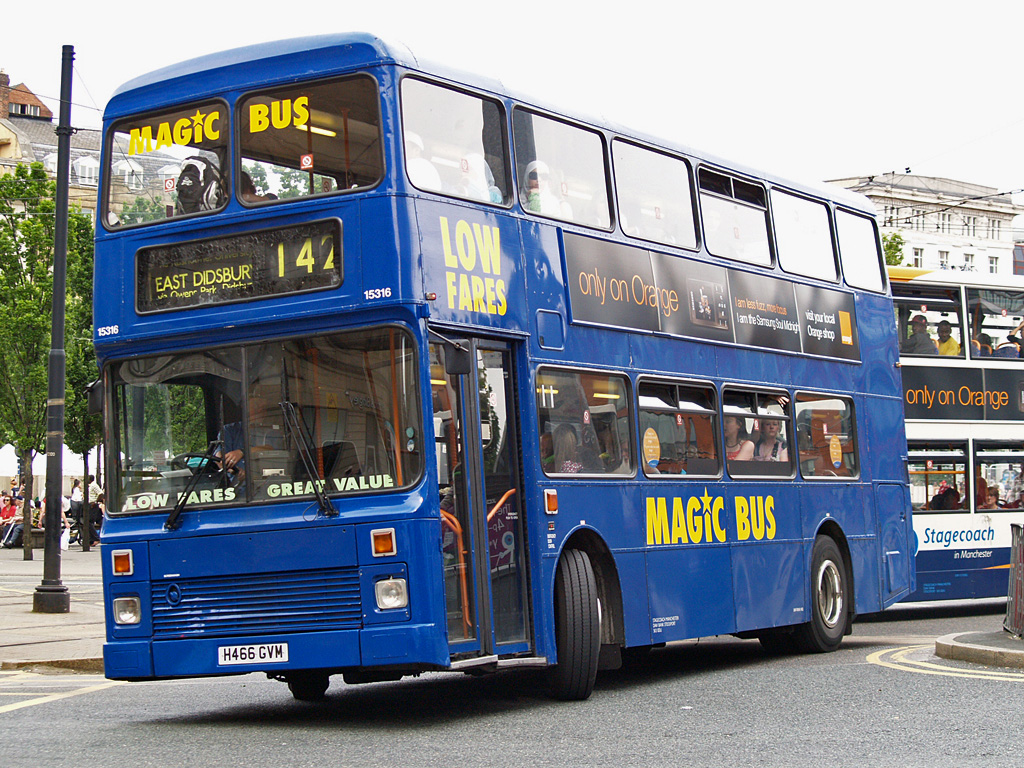
Stagecoach Manchester Northern Counties Palatine bodied Scania N113NRB at Manchester Piccadilly Gardens bus station in July 2008

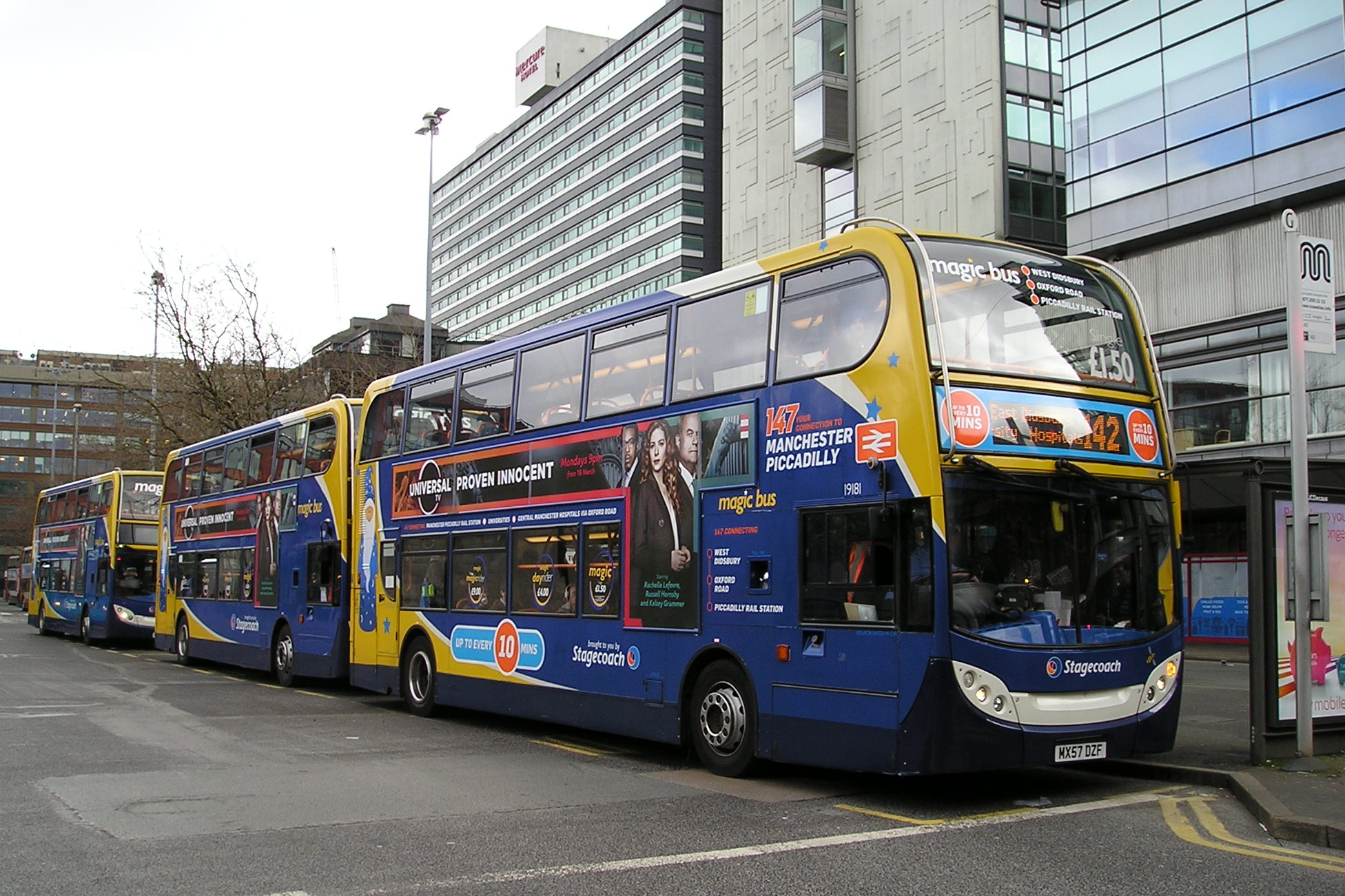
Alexander Dennis Enviro400s at Manchester Piccadilly Gardens bus station in March 2019

Shortly following their takeover of GM Buses South in February 1996, Stagecoach Manchester introduced the Magic Bus brand along the Wilmslow Road bus corridor in Manchester on routes 142 and 143, painting some of the oldest double-deckers in its fleet into a blue livery with yellow fleetnames. With fares reduced to £1 on the three services, eventually increasing to £1.50 in 2017, Stagecoach's Magic Bus services proved highly popular with students at the University of Manchester. Buses used in Manchester included Leyland Olympians, Volvo B10Ms, Volvo Olympians and Scania N113NRBs, as well as some 3-axle Leyland Olympians imported from Stagecoach's Citybus operation in Hong Kong (via a stint with Megabus) and Stagecoach's Kenya Bus operation.

In 2006, Stagecoach Manchester additionally introduced the Magic Bus brand on route 192 to counter a bus war started by UK North. Following UK North being delicenced, the Magic Bus brand ceased operating on route 192, with services provided by Stagecoach returning to standard buses and fares.

In September 2014, route 141 commenced, funded by Manchester Metropolitan University, to serve its Birley Fields accommodation in Hulme. This route was withdrawn in September 2018, after funding from MMU ceased.

In 2018, Stagecoach started operating route 147, from Manchester Piccadilly railway station to West Didsbury, after the expiry of the previous contract with Bullocks Coaches, with the route being extended from its previous terminus at the Manchester Royal Infirmary to West Didsbury, but now omitting the hospital grounds.

As of June 2021, Stagecoach Manchester ran 51 Alexander Dennis Enviro400Hs and one conventional Enviro400 on Magic Bus services on Wilmslow Road routes 142, 143 & 147. During the COVID-19 pandemic in early 2020, services 143 and 147 were temporarily withdrawn, but were reinstated on 1 June 2020.

On 5 January 2025, Magic Bus services in Manchester officially ceased as a result of the rollout of Tranche 3 of Bee Network transferring routes 142, 143 and 147, along with most of their branded vehicles, to Metroline Manchester.

=== Other locations ===
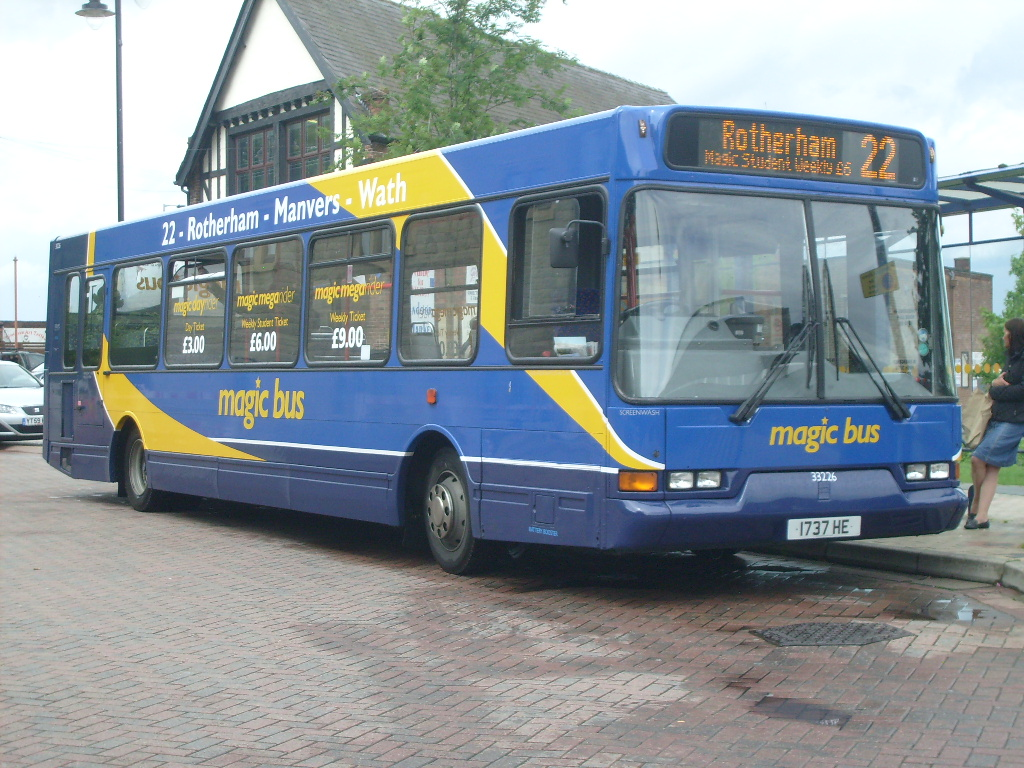
Stagecoach Yorkshire East Lancs Spryte bodied Dennis Dart SLF operating Magic Bus service 22 in May 2011

Stagecoach Busways launched a variant of the Magic Bus brand in Newcastle upon Tyne in April 1997 on three cross-city routes mainly serving Two Ball Lonnen and Walker, each suffixed with the letter 'M'. Though frequencies of buses were increased through to 1998, the services were all withdrawn by Stagecoach and converted back to regular bus fares April 1999.

The Magic Bus brand was also introduced in Liverpool by Stagecoach Merseyside in September 2008 to compete with Arriva Merseyside, running service 14C from Liverpool city centre to Utting Avenue in Norris Green using a fleet of step-entrance single-deck vehicles. Extended to run further along Utting Avenue to the junction of Lower House Lane, Stagecoach Merseyside withdrew its Magic Bus service in January 2011 when Stagecoach and Arriva agreed to co-ordinate timetables on service 14 and its variants.

The last introduction of the Magic Bus brand took place in Rotherham, with Stagecoach Yorkshire launching Magic Bus route 22 in April 2012 to compete directly with First South Yorkshire's service of the same route number, albeit running a slightly different route terminating at Manvers instead of Barnsley. This service has since ceased due to low patronage.

== Magic Mini ==
The Magic Mini minibus brand was used in a small number of locations across the UK, including Corby and Ayr.

=== Corby ===
The brand was used in Corby as "Corby's Magic Mini's" operated using Iveco minibuses along lettered routes around the town centre. The service commenced in 1990 under Stagecoach's then-separate United Counties subsidiary, with the purpose of revitalising the bus network in the town from the previous downfall of bus travel due to an influx of Hackney carriages. The service was operated by United Counties until the 29 November 1999, when it was incorporated into the Stagecoach group. The livery used on the vehicles was a recoloured version of the Stagecoach "Stripes" paintwork. The main bodywork was black, with the stripes being recoloured to gold. The services ran a 5-6 minute frequency, and were free on Saturdays.

=== Scotland ===
The Magic Mini brand was also used in Ayrshire for a time to compete against Ayrways in Ayr and T&E Docherty in Irvine. The Ayr operation used minibuses and larger single-deck buses, which were introduced in February 2004. The brand has since been dropped in Ayrshire when the competing operators withdrew their services.

The Magic Mini brand was also engaged in a miniature bus war on the Black Isle to Inverness route in the Scottish Highlands with local operator Scotbus, with Stagecoach in Inverness adopting aggressive tactics such as scheduling buses five minutes before the rival operator and undercutting fares. Competition between the two operators was acrimonious, climaxing in an arson attack on Stagecoach's Inverness depot.
