= Finglands Coachways =

Bus and coach operator in Greater Manchester

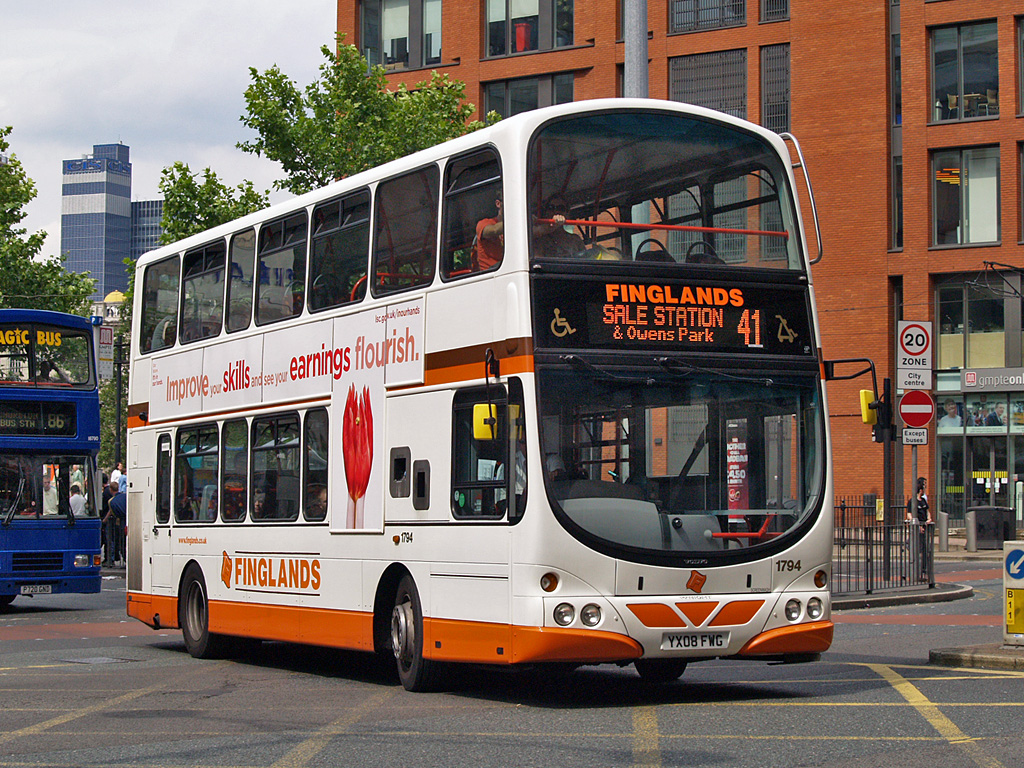
- Wright Eclipse Gemini bodied Volvo B9TL at Piccadilly Gardens bus station in July 2008
- Parent: East Yorkshire Motor Services
- Founded: 1907; 119 years ago
- Ceased operation: 7 February 2014; 12 years ago
- Headquarters: Rusholme, Manchester, England
- Service area: Greater Manchester
- Service type: Bus and coach
- Fleet: 54 (April 2012)
- Website: finglands.co.uk

Finglands Coachways was a bus and coach operator in Rusholme, Manchester. Between 1995 and the company's sale to First Greater Manchester in 2014, it was a subsidiary of East Yorkshire Motor Services.

== History ==
Finglands Coachways was founded by Rolls-Royce test driver Charlie Fingland during 1907. The company was initially operating as a chauffeur-driven limousine and hearse hire company until Charlie Fingland purchased his first coach, a Leyland Tiger, during 1927 to run private hires and excursions within the Rusholme area. In 1930, a twice-daily express coach service between Manchester and London was launched, running until 1937 when the operating licence was sold to the North Western Road Car Company. A coach station on Great Bridgewater Street was opened in 1931, with a London office on Southampton Row, Bloomsbury opening shortly after.

Between 1949 and 1952, Charlie Fingland's son Robert also operated an airline named Fingland's Airways, operating a pair of eight-seater Avro Anson airliners from Ringway Airport on week-long excursions across the southern English coastline, securing permission from the Ministry of Civil Aviation to sell individual seats on these airliners as opposed to chartering them to a group.

Robert Fingland sold Finglands Coachways to a management buyout in 1952 before retiring in South Africa. In 1971, the operations of fellow independent and next-door neighbours C. Holt, with the merger of operations into one site allowing for the reconstruction of Finglands' depot two years later. Bus services competing with GM Buses and other operators was set up following deregulation in 1986, with Finglands operating competitive services on the Wilmslow Road bus corridor to capitalise on the lack of bus capacity for students along the route.

After a deal to sell the company to Shearings had been blocked three years prior following the latter's takeover by the Rank Organisation, in May 1992, Finglands were purchased by East Yorkshire Motor Services (EYMS) of Kingston upon Hull, the company's first purchase outside of their native operating area. In October 1995, Finglands acquired the operations of competitor Stagecoach Manchester, then an operation by Stagecoach Ribble consisting of thirteen buses competing with Finglands and GM Buses South along route 192.

On 1 August 2013, FirstGroup announced that, subject to regulatory approval by the Office of Fair Trading, it had agreed to purchase the bus operations of Finglands. The sale included the lease of Finglands' depot in Rusholme, routes and approximately 100 members of staff, but no buses. The deal was approved in January 2014, with First Greater Manchester taking over on 9 February 2014.

In October 2013, EYMS sold the remaining coach charter operations of Finglands to Bullocks Coaches.

== Operations ==
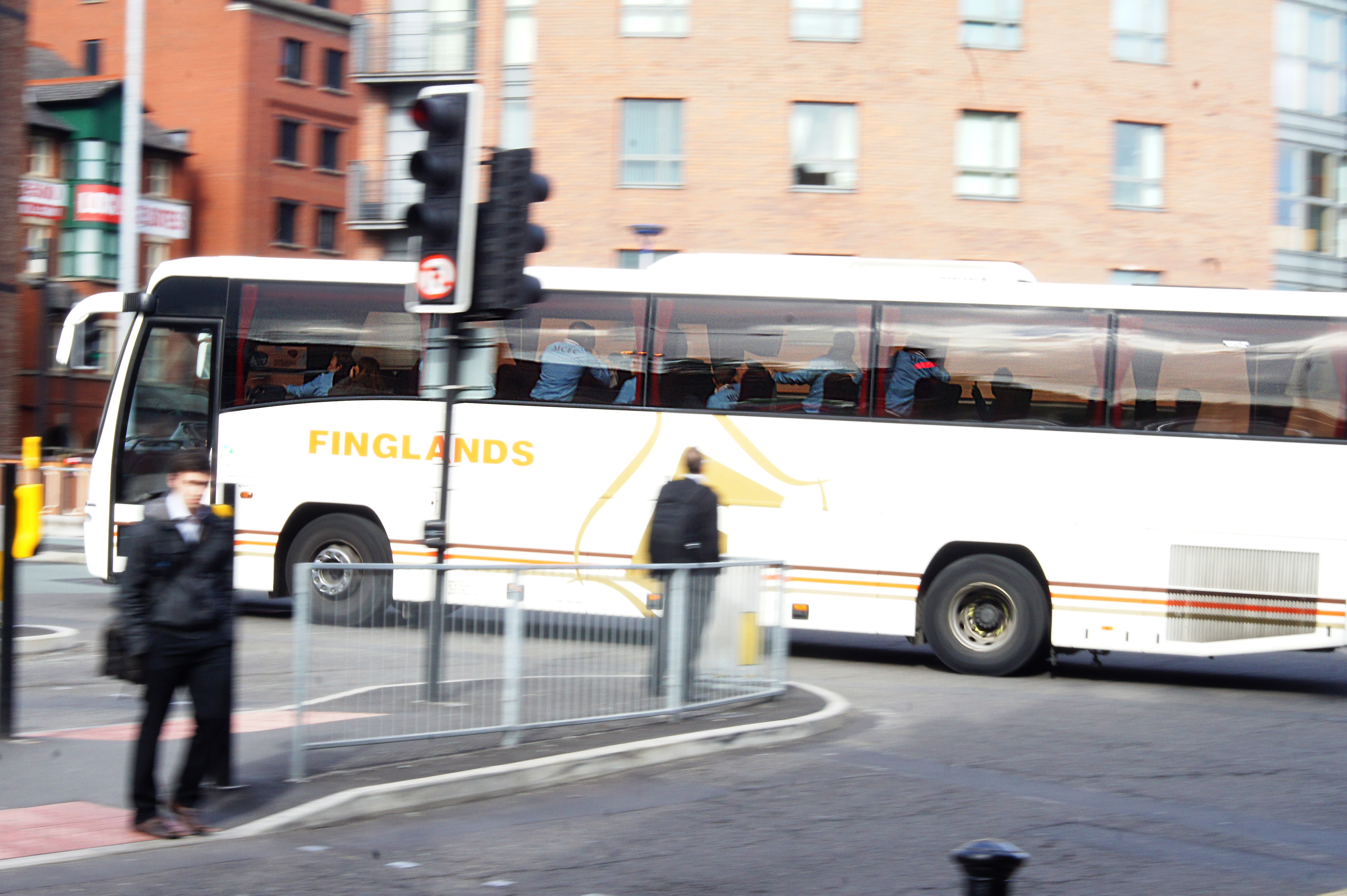
Finglands coach transporting Manchester City F.C. players through Manchester city centre after their 2011 FA Cup final victory

Finglands operated services in Manchester's south, including on Wilmslow Road bus corridor routes 41 and 42. Finglands also operated on route 192 from 1995, following the purchase of Stagecoach Ribble's Manchester operations, until 2006, when they withdrew operations amid a bus war between Stagecoach Manchester and fellow independent UK North on the route.

From the 1930s until shortly before the company's takeover by First, Finglands were the team coach provider for association football team Manchester City F.C.; prior to the club moving to the Etihad Stadium in 2003, Finglands' depot was located a mile away from Manchester City's Maine Road stadium. Coaches specified for use as the club's team coach include a Berkhof Excellence 1000 bodied Volvo B10M in 1995, a Van Hool Alizee bodied Volvo B10M in 1997, and a Volvo 9700 integral coach in 2006.

As of April 2012, the Finglands fleet consisted of 54 buses and coaches.
