= Wilmslow Road bus corridor =

Transport corridor in south Manchester, England

Coordinates: 53.429°N 2.227°W

Wilmslow Road
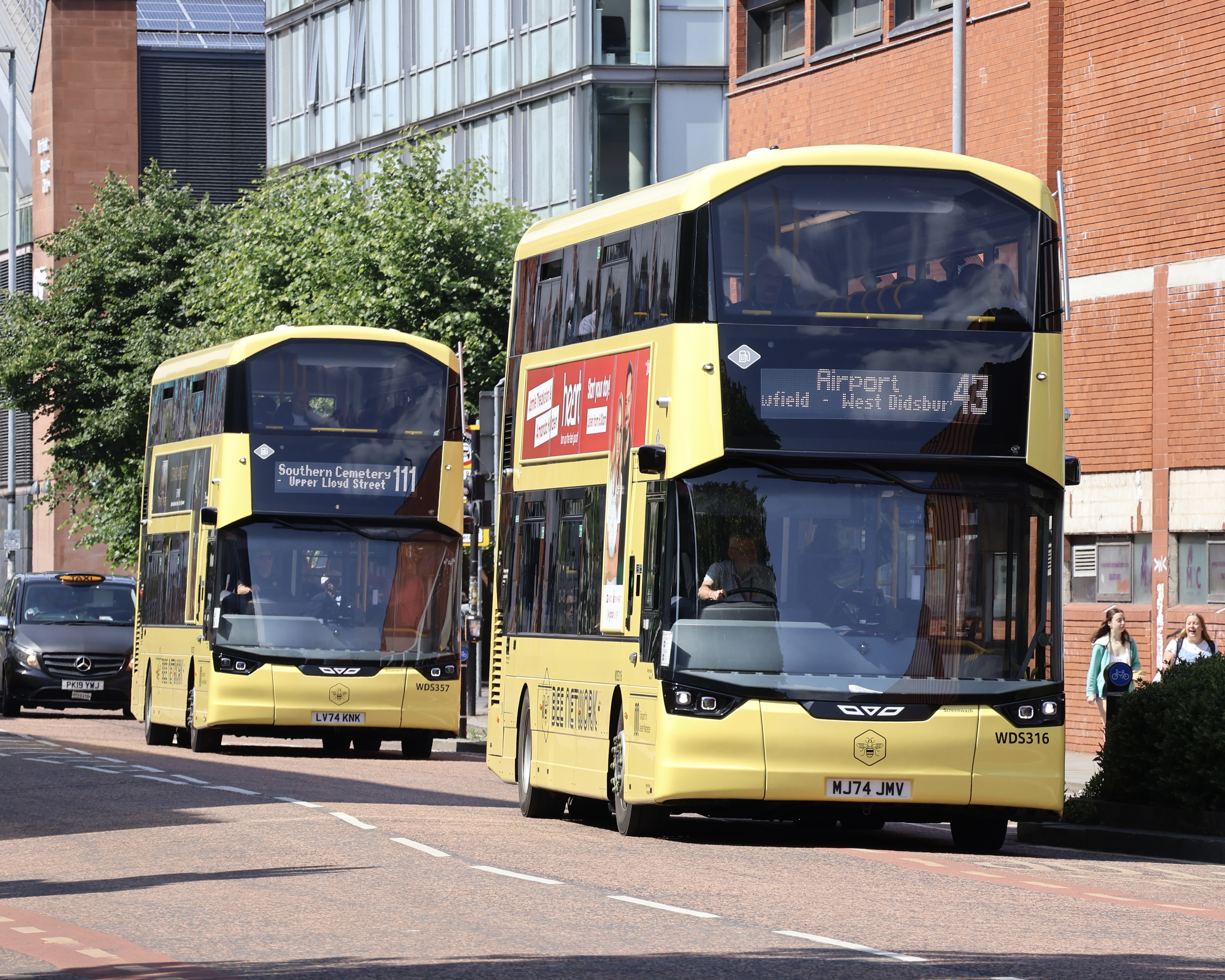
- Two Metroline Manchester buses near to the University of Manchester, June 2025

Overview
- Operator: Stagecoach Manchester, Metroline Manchester, Go North West
- Former operators: Bullocks, Finglands Coachways, UK North, Manchester Community Transport, Arriva North West, Magic Bus
- Routes: 41: Middleton – Sale, 42: Manchester – Stockport, 42A: Manchester – Reddish, 42B: Manchester – Woodford, 42C: Manchester – Handforth Dean, 43: Manchester – Airport, 142: Manchester – East Didsbury, 143: Manchester – West Didsbury, 147: Manchester – West Didsbury, V1: Manchester - Leigh, V2: Manchester - Atherton, V4: Manchester - Ellenbrook

The Wilmslow Road bus corridor is a 5.5 mi (8.9 km)-long section of road in Manchester, England, that is served by a large number of bus services. The corridor runs from Parrs Wood to Manchester city centre along Wilmslow and Oxford Roads, via Didsbury, Withington, Fallowfield and Rusholme.

Several frequent routes combine to operate along the northern section, providing access to the University of Manchester, Manchester Metropolitan University (MMU), the Royal Northern College of Music (RNCM), Manchester Royal Infirmary (MRI) and The Christie.

== History ==
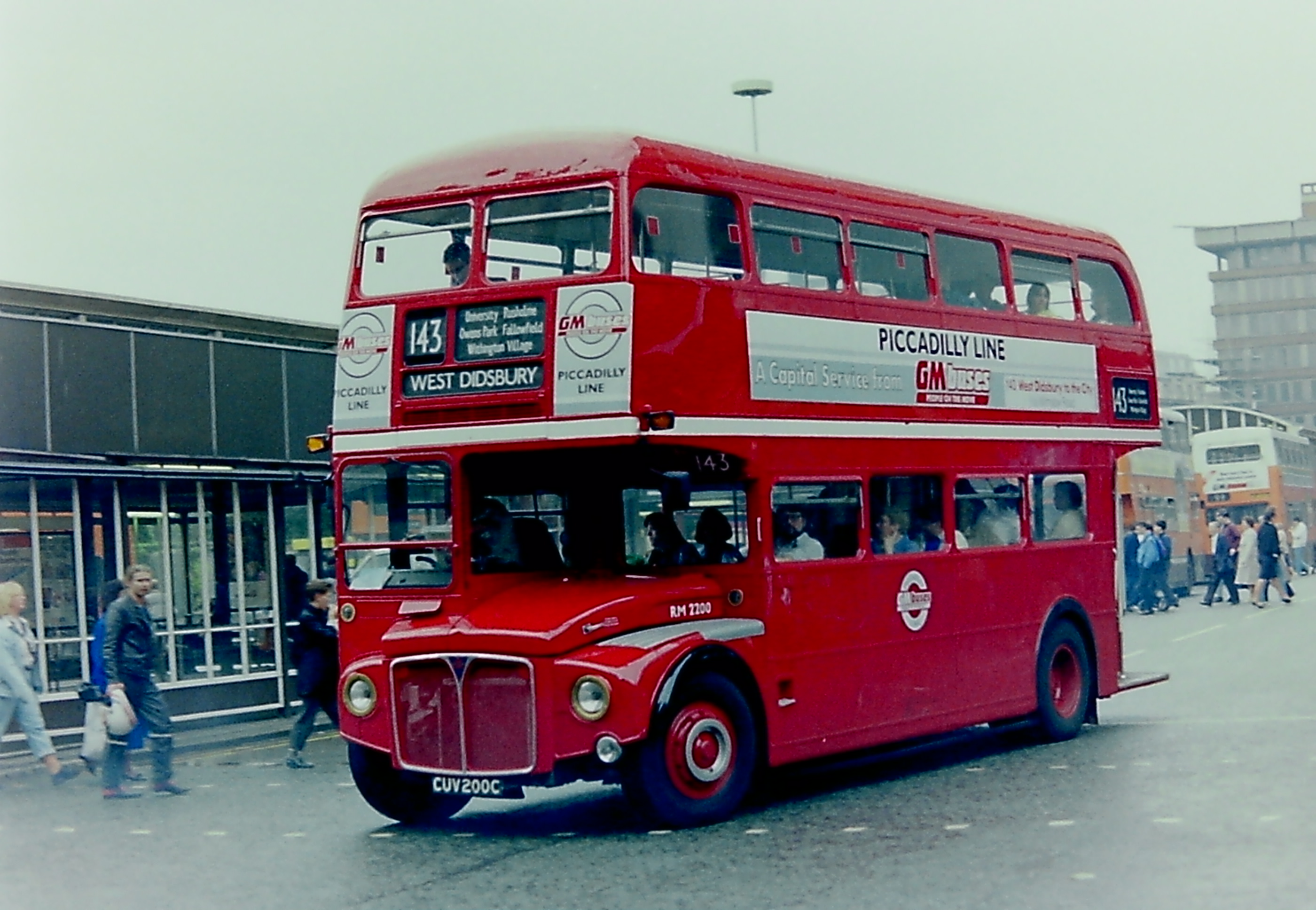
A GM Buses Piccadilly Line-branded AEC Routemaster at Piccadilly Gardens bus station on route 143, September 1988

Bus deregulation in October 1986 allowed bus companies to run services wherever and whenever they wanted. Prior to this, most bus services along Wilmslow Road had been operated by publicly-owned operator Greater Manchester Passenger Transport Executive (GMPTE).

In 1986, the bus operation was separated into a stand-alone company, GM Buses. Finglands Coachways started operating their own competitive bus services soon after, capitalising on the lack of capacity for students along the route. They were soon followed by other operators including Wall's and Bullocks Coaches.

GM Buses fought back by reintroducing conductor-operated buses to the route. Ten AEC Routemasters were acquired from London in 1988 and operated on route 143 to West Didsbury, branded as the Piccadilly Line after the London Underground line. They operated until June 1990, when they were replaced with standard vehicles. Larger operators also operated competing services along Wilmslow Road during the 1990s, including Bee Line and MTL Manchester.

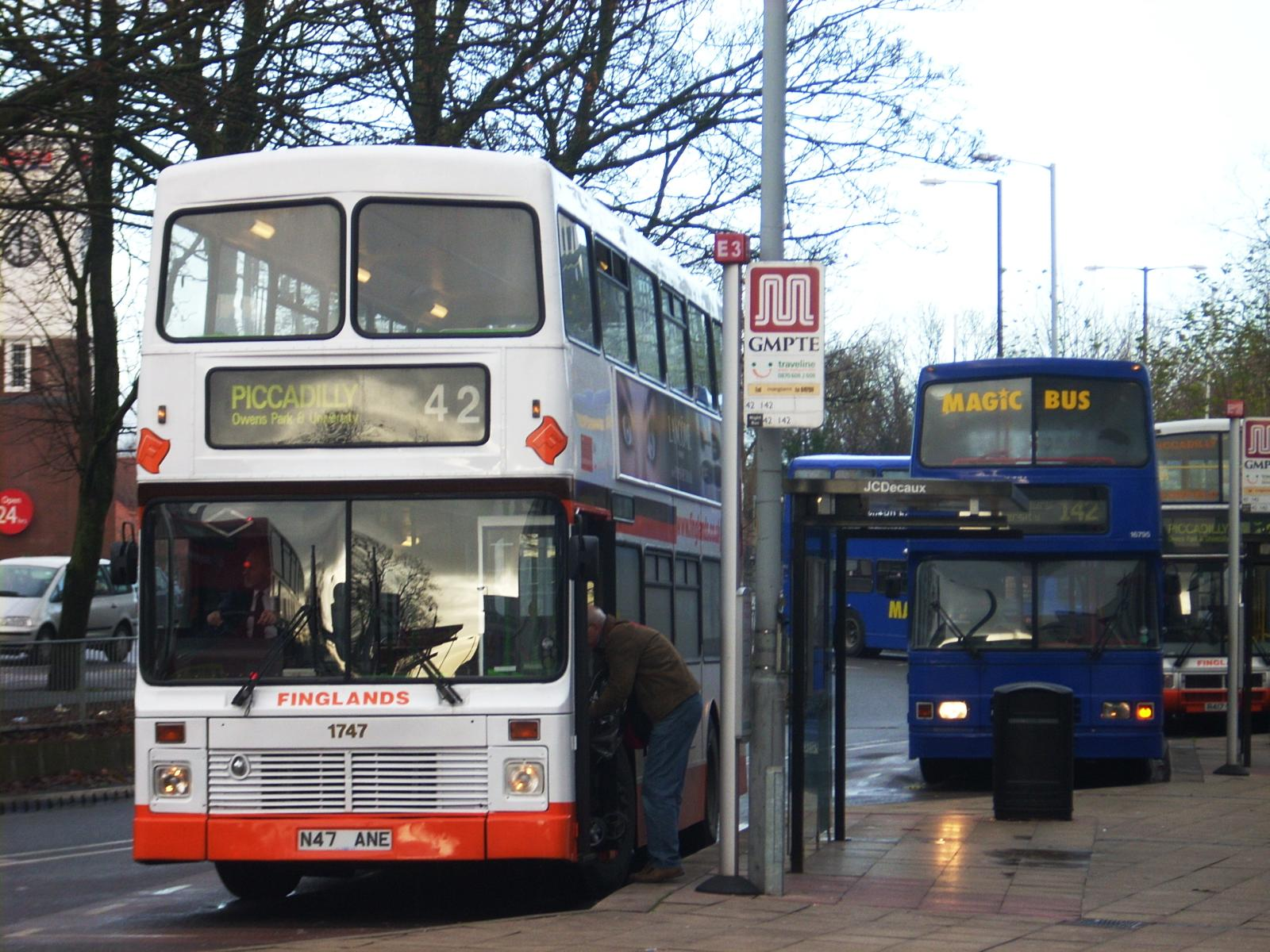
Competing Finglands Coachways and Magic Bus services await departure from Parrs Wood terminus on journeys to Piccadilly Gardens, December 2009

The southern half of GM Buses was sold to Stagecoach Holdings in February 1996, which introduced the "no frills" Magic Bus services along the route in competition with their main routes. Intense competition from a new operator called UK North led to lower fares, with Finglands Coachways offering a £2 student weekly ticket in 2001. Competition eventually reduced by the end of the 2000s; UK North ceased operations in 2006, after an investigation into their safety records by the North West Traffic Commissioner, whilst Bullocks sold their bus services to Stagecoach in 2008.

Stagecoach Manchester introduced 30 new Alexander Dennis Enviro400H double-decker hybrid electric buses on services 42 and 43 in September 2010. The vehicles were funded through the Department for Transport's Green Bus Fund. Bullocks Coaches were also awarded similar funding for the delivery of four Wright Eclipse Gemini 2-bodied Volvo B5LHs for use on Oxford Road Link route 147 in collaboration with the University of Manchester.

On 1 August 2013, First Greater Manchester announced that it had agreed to purchase Finglands Coachways. The deal was concluded on 9 February 2014. On 27 April 2014, First Greater Manchester increased service levels and extended some route 42 journeys to North Manchester General Hospital under the Cross Connect banner.

In response on 19 May 2014, Stagecoach Manchester introduced route 38 from Farnworth to Rusholme, via Salford and the city centre.

In September 2014, Stagecoach Manchester and Manchester Metropolitan University introduced Magic Bus route 141 along the corridor, serving the university's Birley campus and East Didsbury. Vehicles used on the 141 were branded with green Manchester Metropolitan University branding alongside their Magic Bus liveries. From September 2015, the service was amended to terminate in West Didsbury.

== The busiest bus corridor in Europe? ==
Wilmslow Road is often claimed to be the busiest bus corridor in Europe; however, this is difficult to verify because:

- No authoritative comparison is available
- The bus frequency on Wilmslow Road varies at different points. This will be true of other corridors and hence the busiest corridor is likely to depend on how short a road can be considered
- Bus frequencies vary during the day, so the busiest corridor may depend on whether the peak frequency or average frequency is taken
- No qualifier is given as to what constitutes 'busy', whether it's the frequency of buses or total passengers carried and when.

The 3.7 mi (6.0 km) stretch of route between Piccadilly Gardens and Withington has a timetabled average of at least one bus per minute in each direction on Monday to Friday daytimes during university terms. However, particularly during rush hour, there are many buses which do not appear on the timetable and rather repeat the journey as frequently as possible.

Since 6 January 2025, when the final rollout of franchising in Greater Manchester came into effect, bus services on the corridor have been operated by Stagecoach Manchester, Metroline Manchester and Go North West, on behalf of Transport for Greater Manchester (TfGM) under the Bee Network brand. Frequent services were run in the corridor; the half mile stretch of route in the city centre between the Royal National College of Music and Oxford Road station has a timetabled average of nearly a bus every 30 seconds in each direction.

In 2006, the Parliamentary Select Committee on Transport was told:

"The Wilmslow Road corridor, although enjoying a level of service that no other route in England has in terms of the frequency of buses, is chaos. This is because many companies are running the same route and competing for passengers. Various estimations of patronage have been suggested from research, one as low as 3.5 passengers per bus on average. In actual fact, the exact figures are not available to us because of commercial sensitivity. Stagecoach prices along this route are high and smaller companies buy up cheaper, older and dirtier buses and carry passengers for as little as a third of the Stagecoach price. Some of them still carry London posters because they are rejected stock from London, where standards are higher. Observations reported to us suggest that they will wait to fill up with as many passengers as possible rather than sticking to a timetable and there have been reports of some companies waiting at a stop until another company's bus is just behind and then pulling off. Although one has to wait literally seconds for a bus, the congestion at certain junctions because of too many buses and the unwillingness of these buses to stick to timetables makes travelling on this route an unpleasant and stressful one."

== Routes ==
=== Major routes ===
==== Route 41 ====
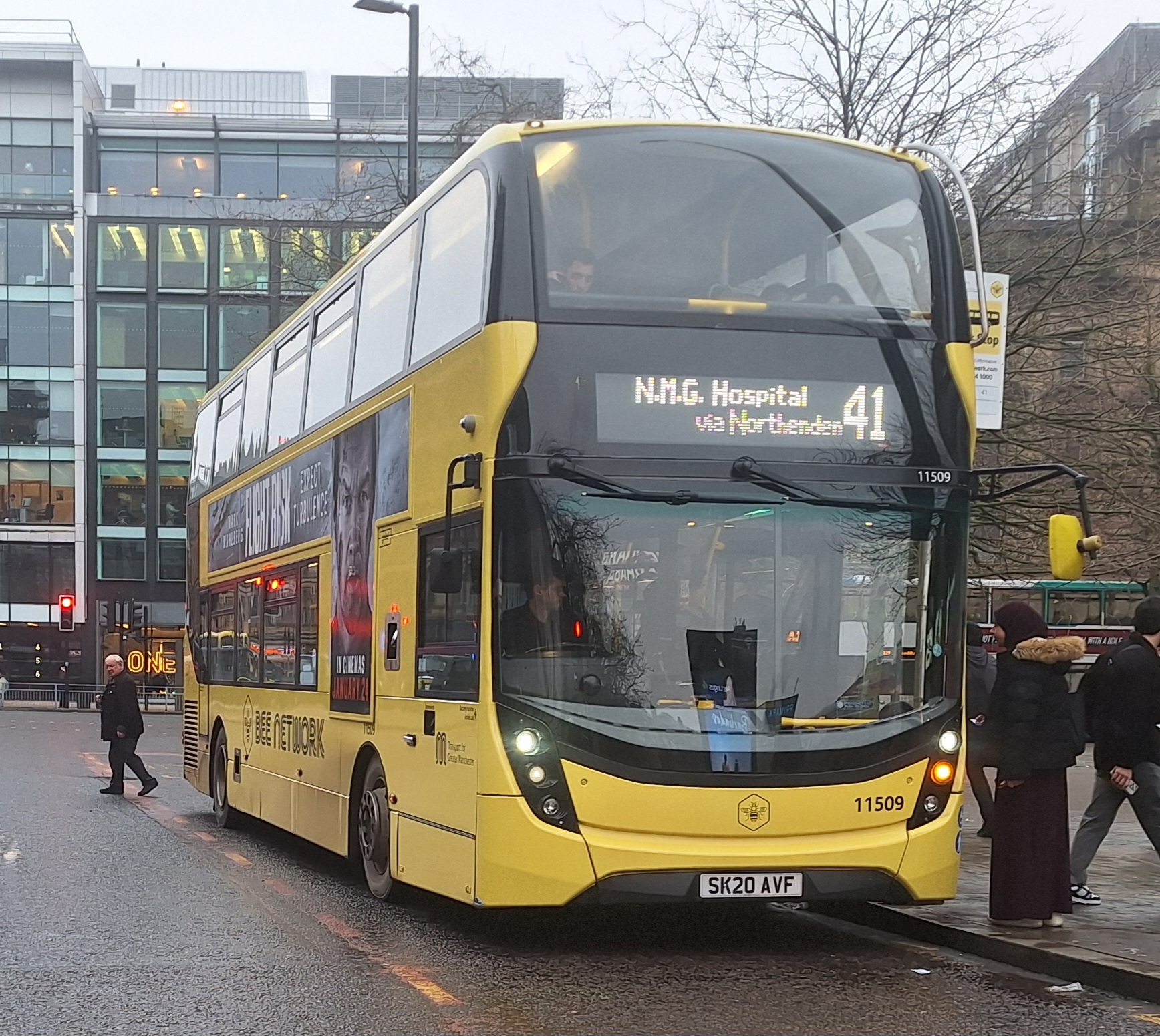
A Stagecoach Manchester Alexander Dennis Enviro400 MMC at Piccadilly Gardens, January 2025

Route 41 is operated by Stagecoach Manchester, running on Mondays to Saturdays up to every 20 minutes and every 30 minutes on Sundays between Middleton, North Manchester General Hospital, Manchester, Northenden and Sale; the evening service runs hourly. The service was once served by First, Finglands Coachways and Go North West, as well as Stagecoach on its X41 (Altrincham – Manchester) and 143 (West Didsbury – Manchester) services respectively.

==== Routes 42/42A ====
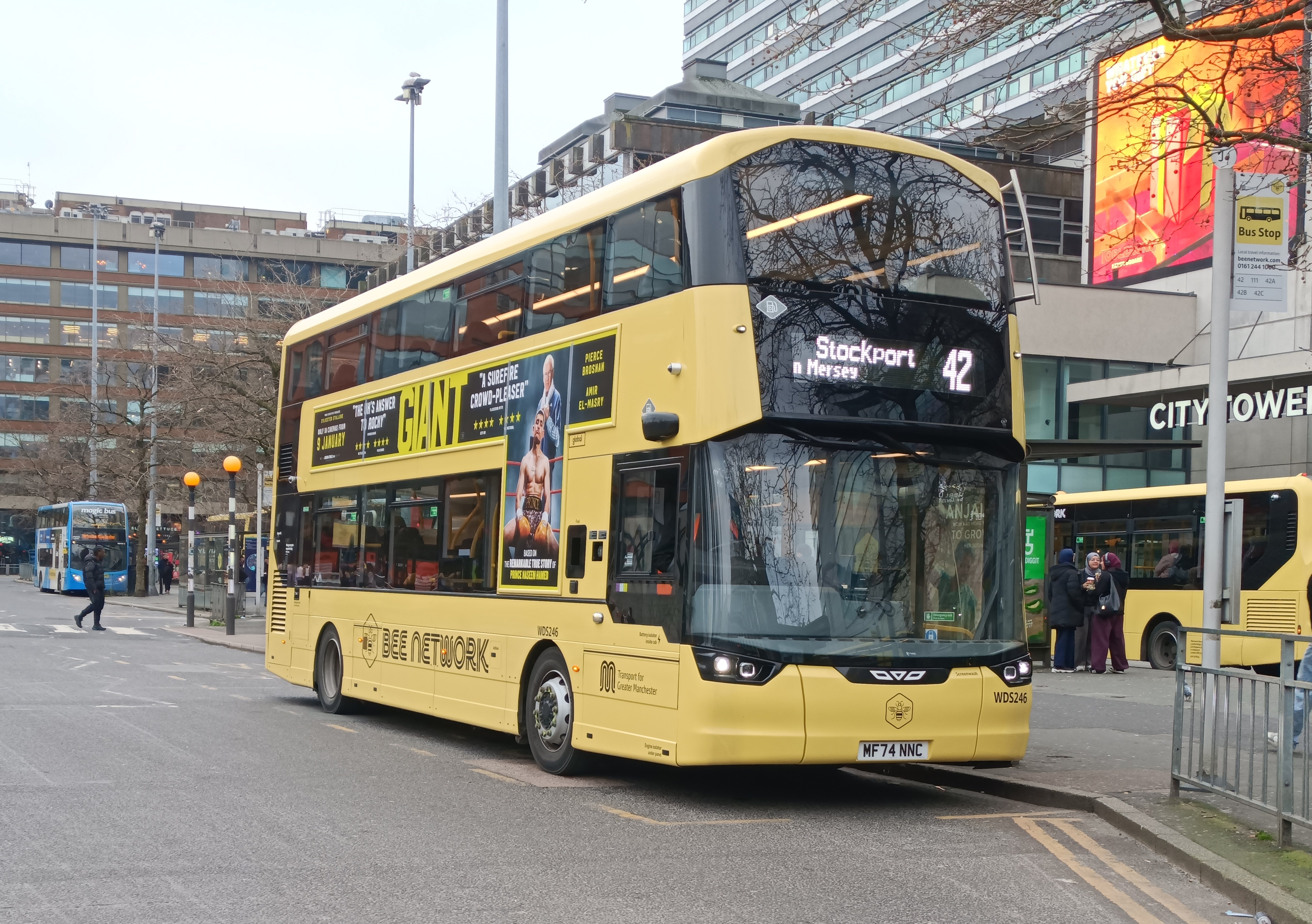
A Metroline Manchester Wright StreetDeck Ultroliner at Piccadilly Gardens, December 2025

These services run for the entire length of the corridor and beyond. Service 42, operated by Metroline Manchester, serves the busy Wilmslow Road bus corridor, which includes universities and hospitals, operating from the city centre to Parrs Wood and Stockport, the Infirmary, and Withington. Service 42A operates from Reddish to Manchester every 30 minutes, via East Didsbury and Rusholme; on Sundays and evenings on Mondays to Saturdays, it runs hourly between Reddish and East Didsbury only.

The route was historically operated by Finglands Coachways and Stagecoach Manchester between Piccadilly Gardens bus station and Parrs Wood. UK North also operated services in the mid-2000s during its bus war with Stagecoach. Following the sale of the Finglands business to First Greater Manchester on 9 February 2014, the new operator extended its route 42 services to become a cross city service from North Manchester General Hospital under the Cross Connect banner on 26 April 2014; these were operated using a fleet of new Alexander Dennis Enviro400 double-decker buses and Wright StreetLite single-decker buses. This service further extended to Middleton bus station on 12 April 2015, additionally extending to start at East Didsbury.

First Greater Manchester withdrew its operations on the route in July 2018, as a result of the closure of Rusholme depot, leaving Stagecoach Manchester as the sole operator of the route. From 5 January 2025, the route began to be operated by Metroline Manchester as part of Tranche 3 of Bee Network.

==== Route 42B/42C ====
Route 42B runs every 60 minutes along the entire route from Manchester to East Didsbury, continuing on to Woodford, via Bramhall. It is operated by Metroline Manchester.

Route 42C follows the 42B route from Manchester to East Didsbury, before continuing to Handforth Dean via Cheadle. 42B was the updated all-stop replacement for X57/145, which operated morning only Cheadle Hulme to Albert Square one-way.

==== Route 43 ====
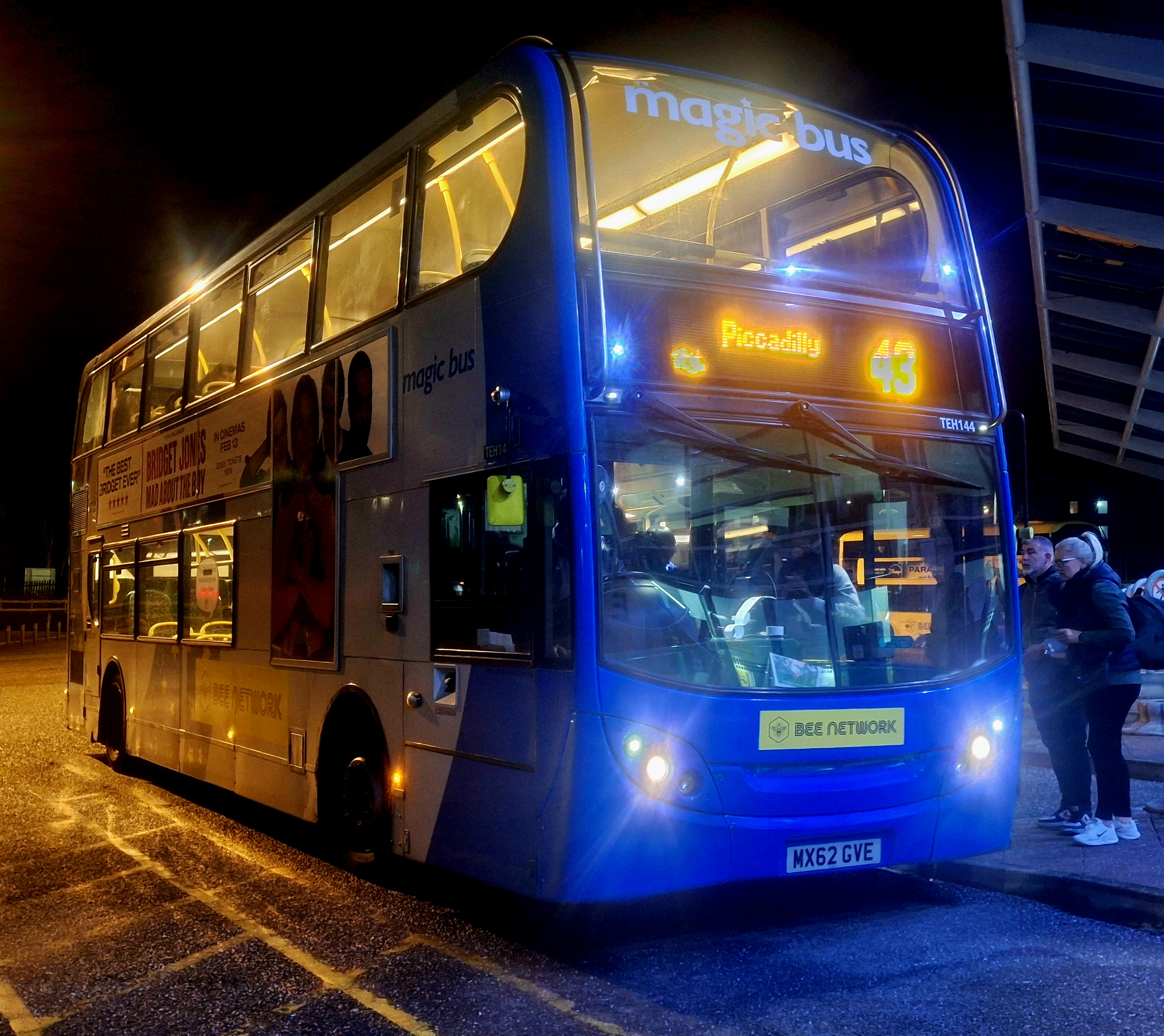
A Metroline Manchester Magic Bus-branded Enviro400H on route 43 at Manchester Airport, February 2025

Route 43 is operated by Metroline Manchester, running every 10 to 30 minutes, 24 hours a day. It operates from Manchester to Withington, then on to Manchester Airport, via Northenden and Wythenshawe. It is the only bus route that runs every day of the year. Along with route 42, it was one of the first Stagecoach routes to use hybrid Alexander Dennis Enviro400H double-deckers.

==== Routes 142/143/147 ====
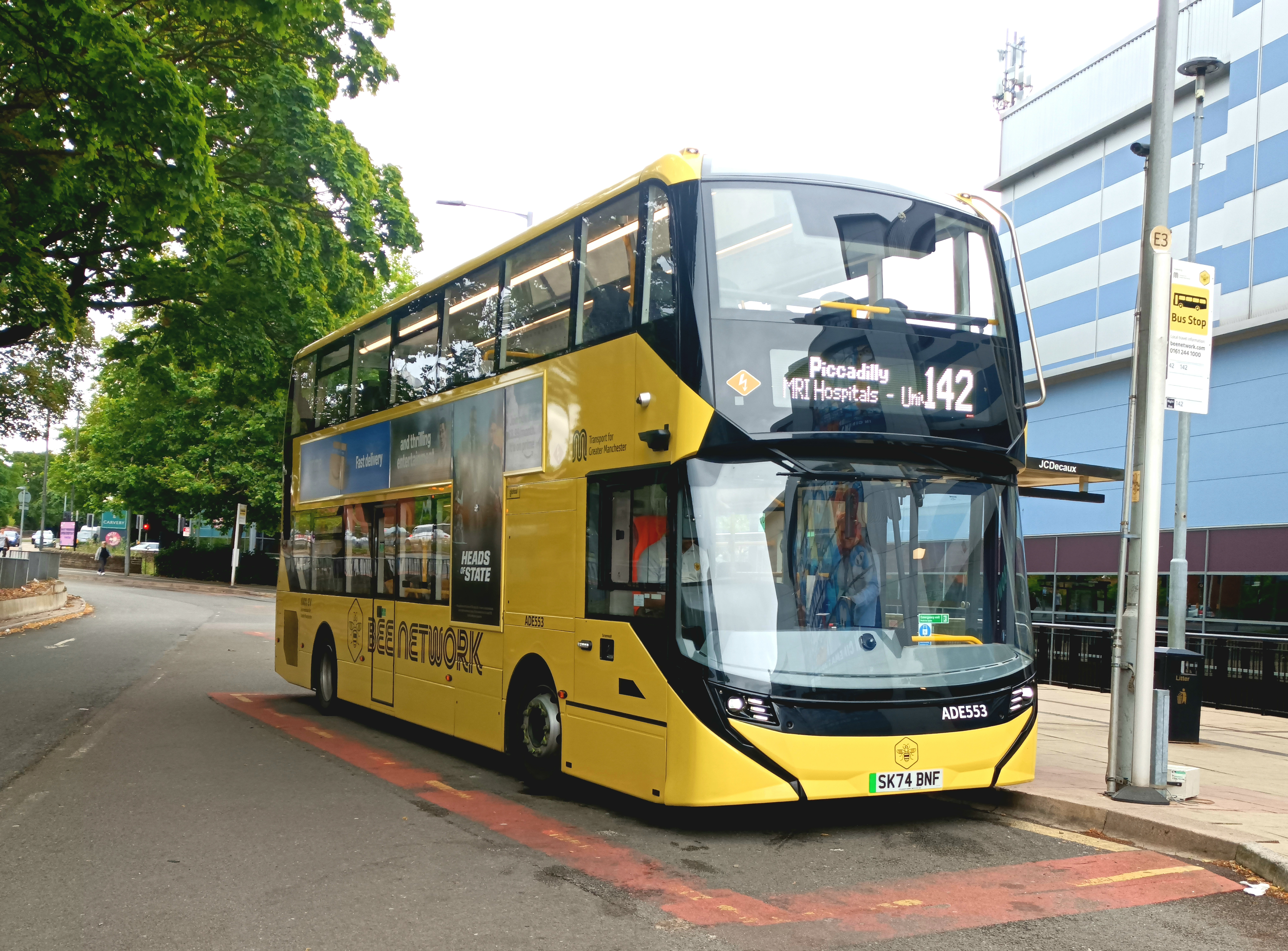
A Metroline Manchester second generation Alexander Dennis Enviro400EV on route 142 at Parrs Wood, July 2025

Metroline Manchester operates route 142 between the city centre and East Didsbury, 143 between Manchester and West Didsbury, and 147 between Piccadilly station to West Didsbury. Before the rollout of Tranche 3 of the Bee Network, these high-frequency services were operated by Stagecoach Manchester under the Magic Bus brand, using older buses operating with ticket prices cheaper than commercial Stagecoach services; this was maintained until the £2 bus fare cap scheme was introduced in 2022, resulting in the same flat fare with other bus services operating within Greater Manchester.

Route 142 operates short journeys between Chorlton-on-Medlock and Withington, with extra journeys at peak times to cater specifically for students. The 143 service to Sale replaced the limited stop X41, which had a much higher demand; however, the route now operates only two journeys a week during college times along this section of the route, with all other services terminating at West Didsbury.

==== Routes V1/V2/V4 ====
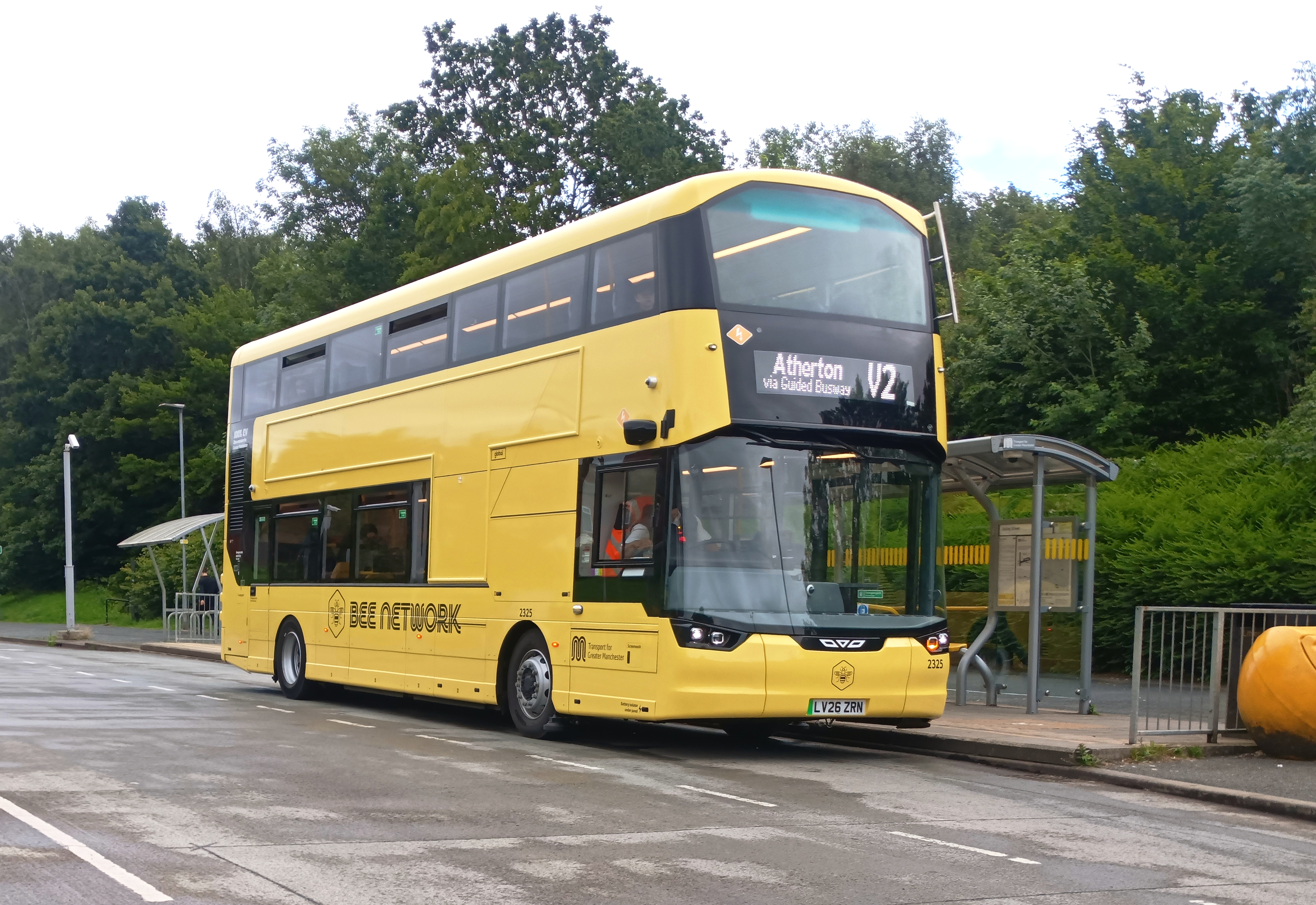
A Go North West Wright StreetDeck Electroliner on route V2, June 2026

Routes V1, V2 and V4 are part of the Vantage Guided Busway network operated by Go North West. The V1 and V2 use very high spec branded buses, running from the Manchester Royal Infirmary to Leigh (V1) and Atherton (V2), via the city centre and Tyldesley. The V4 provides peak-time extras between Ellenbrook and Manchester Royal Infirmary, using standard Bee Network-branded vehicles.

=== Minor routes ===
==== Route 18 ====
Route 18 is operated by Stagecoach Manchester, running every 30 minutes from Manchester Royal Infirmary to the city centre, then continuing to Langley, via Collyhurst and Middleton.

==== Routes 23/171/172 ====
Route 23 is operated by Stagecoach Manchester every 20 minutes, and runs from Stockport to the Trafford Centre via Didsbury, Chorlton-cum-Hardy, Stretford and Urmston. It once operated alongside sister routes 24 and 23A, which operated the same route between Stockport and Stretford but then on to MediaCityUK (24) and via Lostock instead of Urmston (23A) at a combined frequency of every ten minutes. Route 24 was withdrawn in 2017, due to much lower than expected patronage; this is most likely due to Metrolink connectivity in the areas it served, lowering the combined frequency to every 15 minutes. The long-running service 23A was withdrawn in April 2019 and the section in Lostock is now served by route 25.

Routes 171 and 172 are operated by Stagecoach Manchester, running every 30 minutes to Newton Heath from Chorlton-cum-Hardy (172) and Withington Hospital (171). The 171 goes continues via Gorton, Levenshulme and East Didsbury, while the 172 goes via Gorton, Levenshulme and West Didsbury.

==== Route 53 ====
Route 53 is operated by Stagecoach Manchester and runs from Cheetham Hill to Pendleton every 30 minutes via Gorton, Rusholme, Old Trafford and Salford Quays.

==== Other routes ====
Several school services operate on the route, which are generally unmarked.

Former, now-withdrawn, routes are the 16, 23A, 24, 45, 46, 47, 48, 141, 145, 157, 178, 270, 278 and X57.

Routes that have been altered, so that they no longer serve the Wilmslow Road corridor, include services 17, 84, 130, 179, 370 and X41.

== Future plans ==
TfGM has developed bus priority measures along Wilmslow Road, in order to enable the provision of cross-city services. This scheme includes the section of Oxford Road in the vicinity of the university and Hospitals becoming limited to buses, cycles and hackney carriages only; it also includes a new section of bus lane in Withington and a revised layout at Parrs Wood terminus. The first stage of the bus priority work was completed in June 2016, with the project officially completed in September 2017.

== Gallery ==
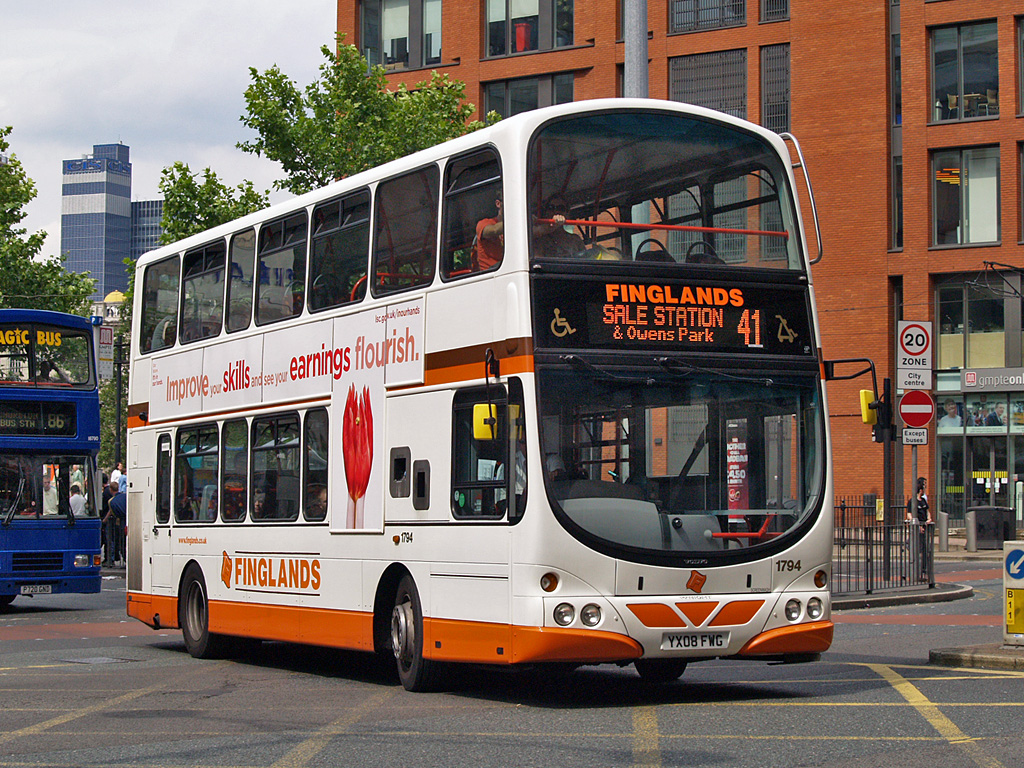
A Finglands Coachways Wright Eclipse Gemini-bodied Volvo B7TL on route 41, July 2008

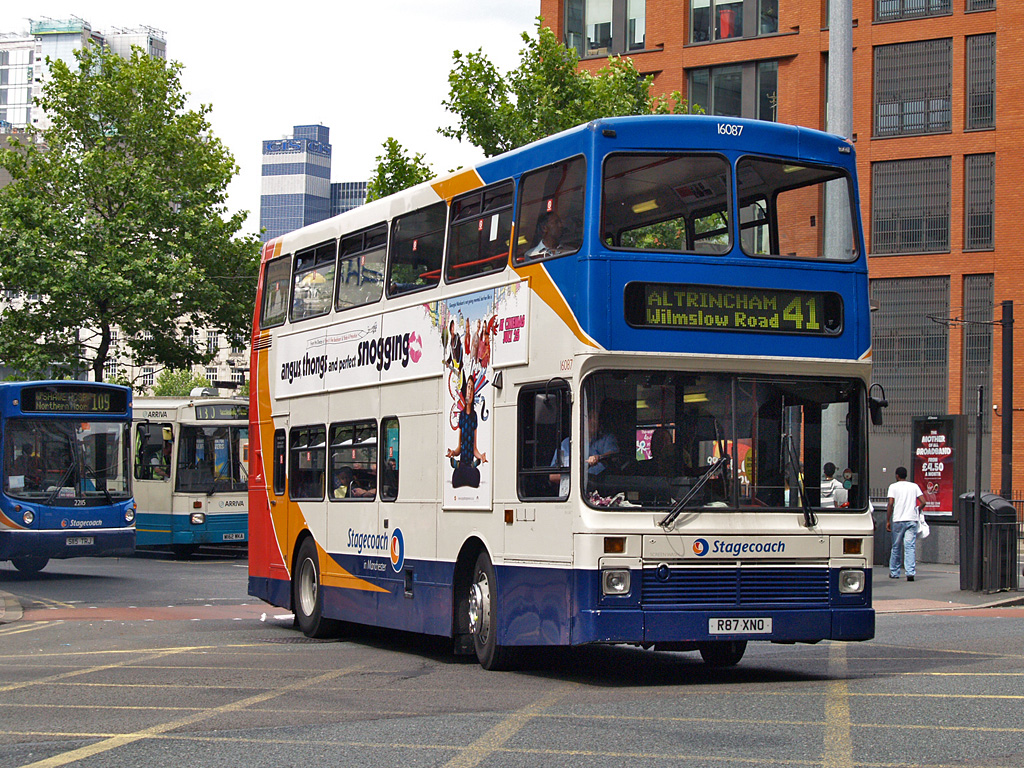
A Stagecoach Manchester Northern Counties Palatine-bodied Volvo Olympian on route 41, July 2008

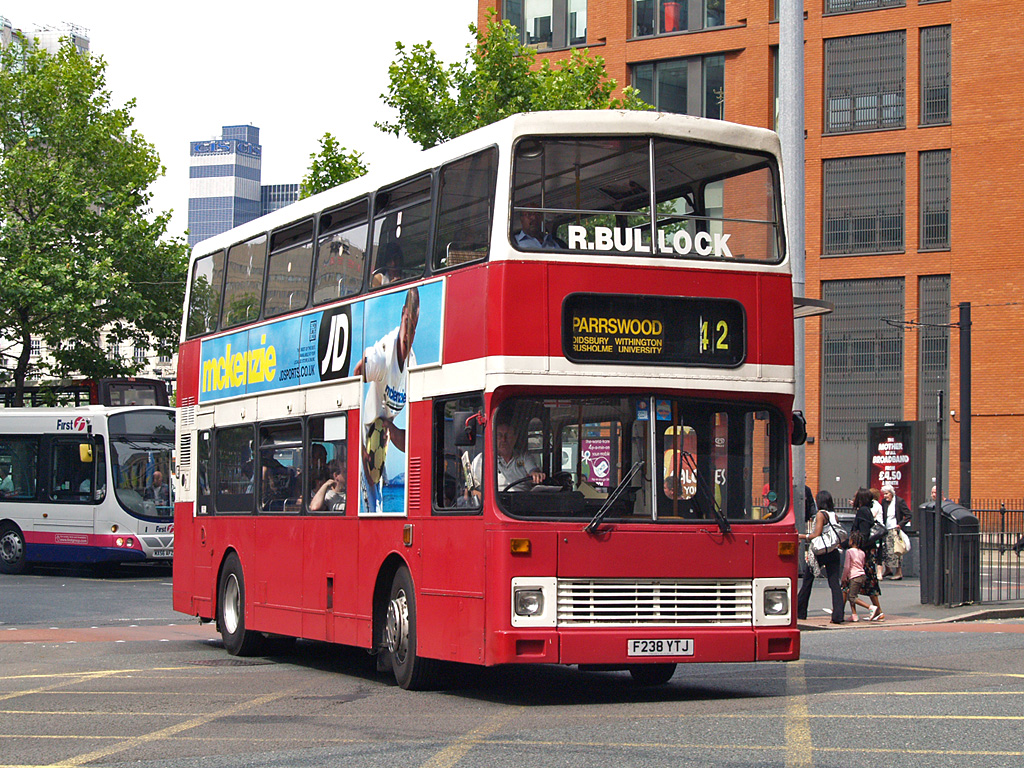
A Bullocks Northern Counties Palatine bodied Leyland Olympian on route 42, July 2008

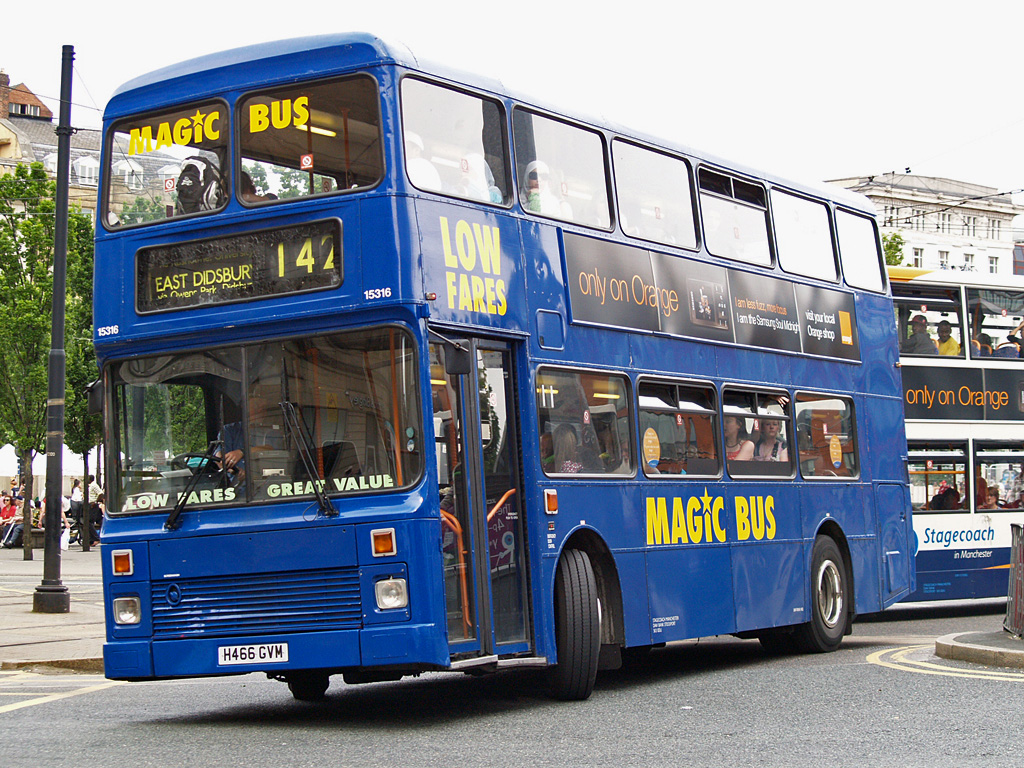
A Magic Bus Northern Counties Palatine-bodied Scania N113 DRB on route 142, July 2008

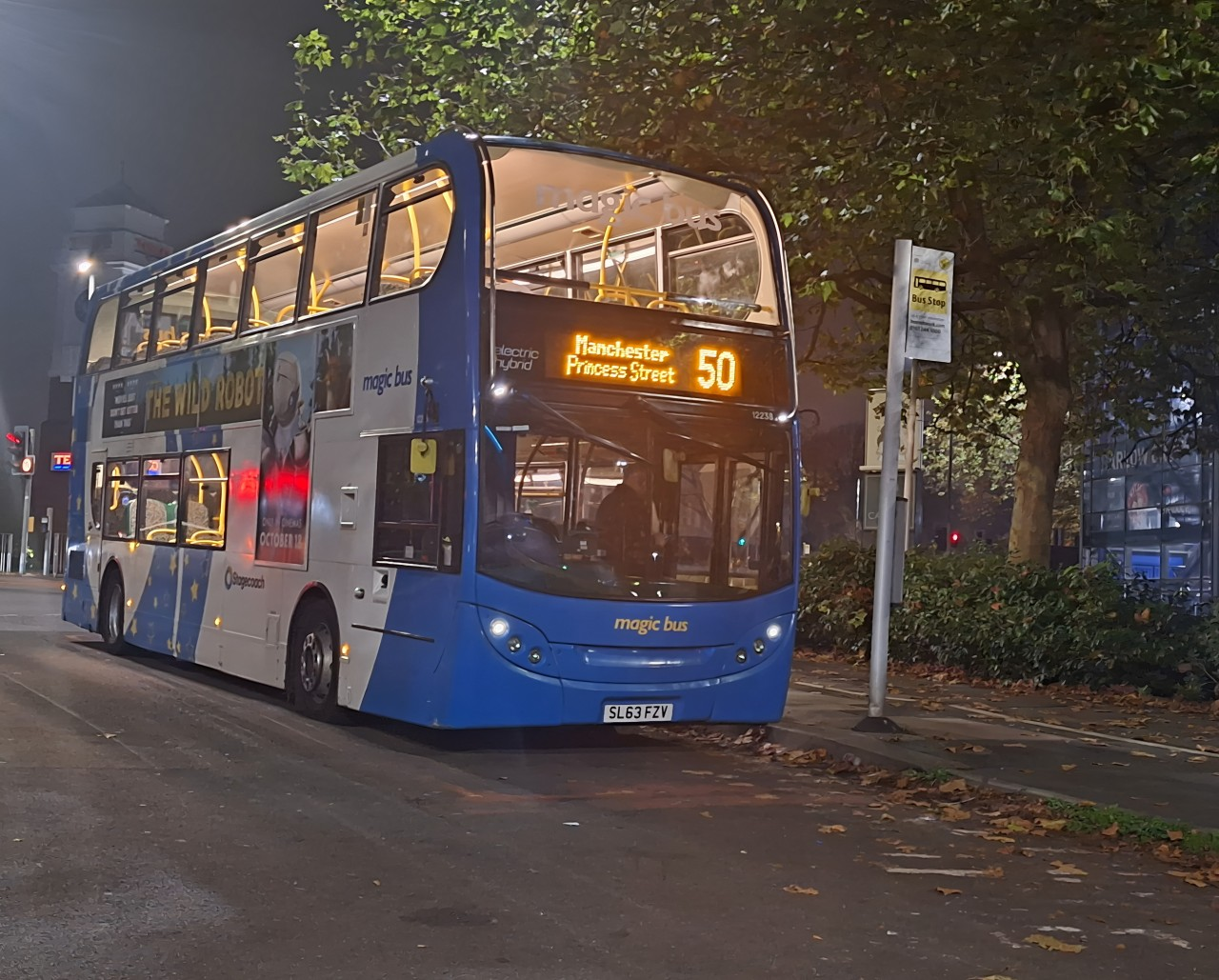
A Magic Bus-branded Alexander Dennis Enviro400H on route 50, November 2024

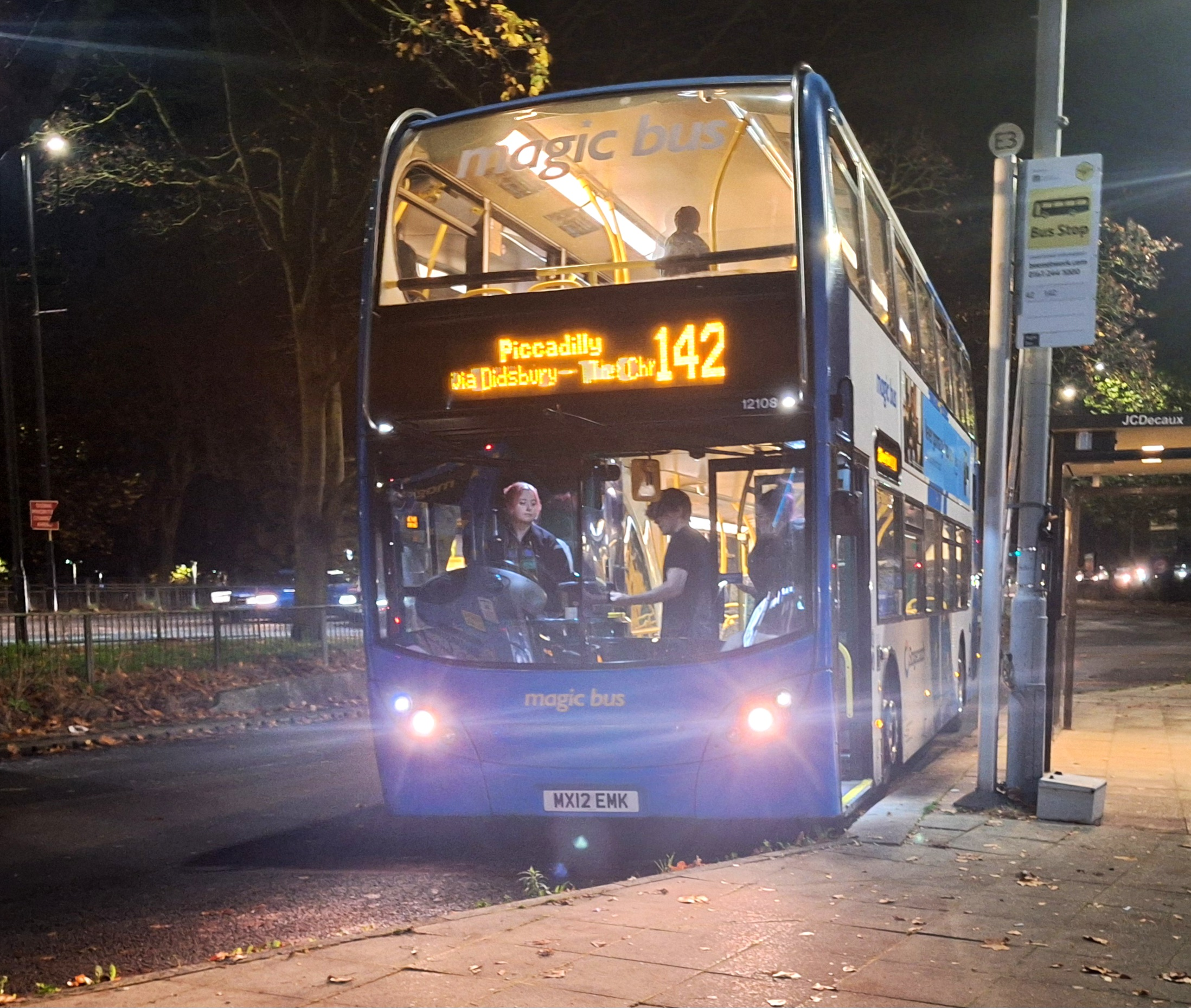
Another Magic Bus-branded Alexander Dennis Enviro400H on route 142, November 2024

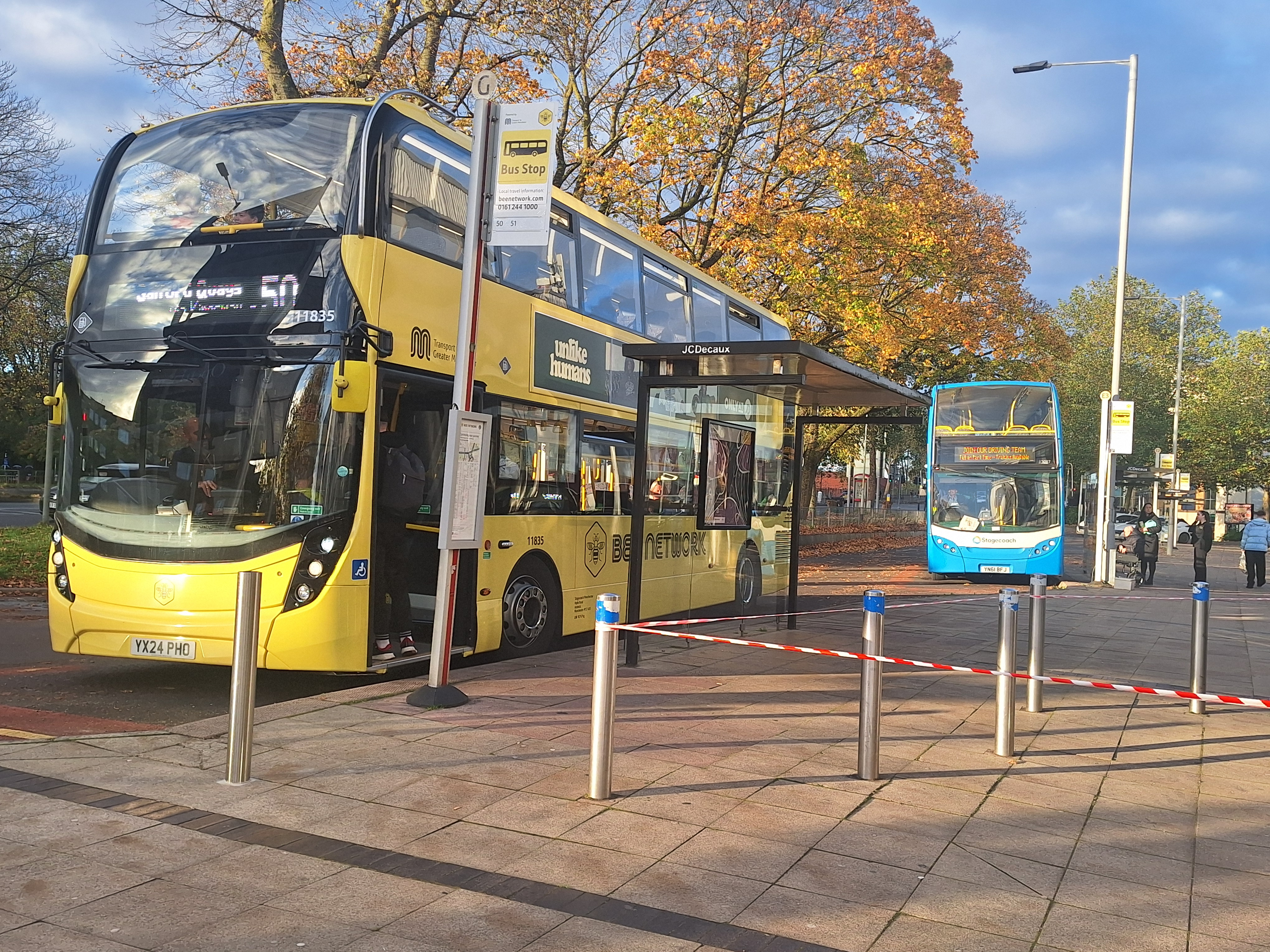
Stagecoach Manchester buses awaiting departure, October 2024

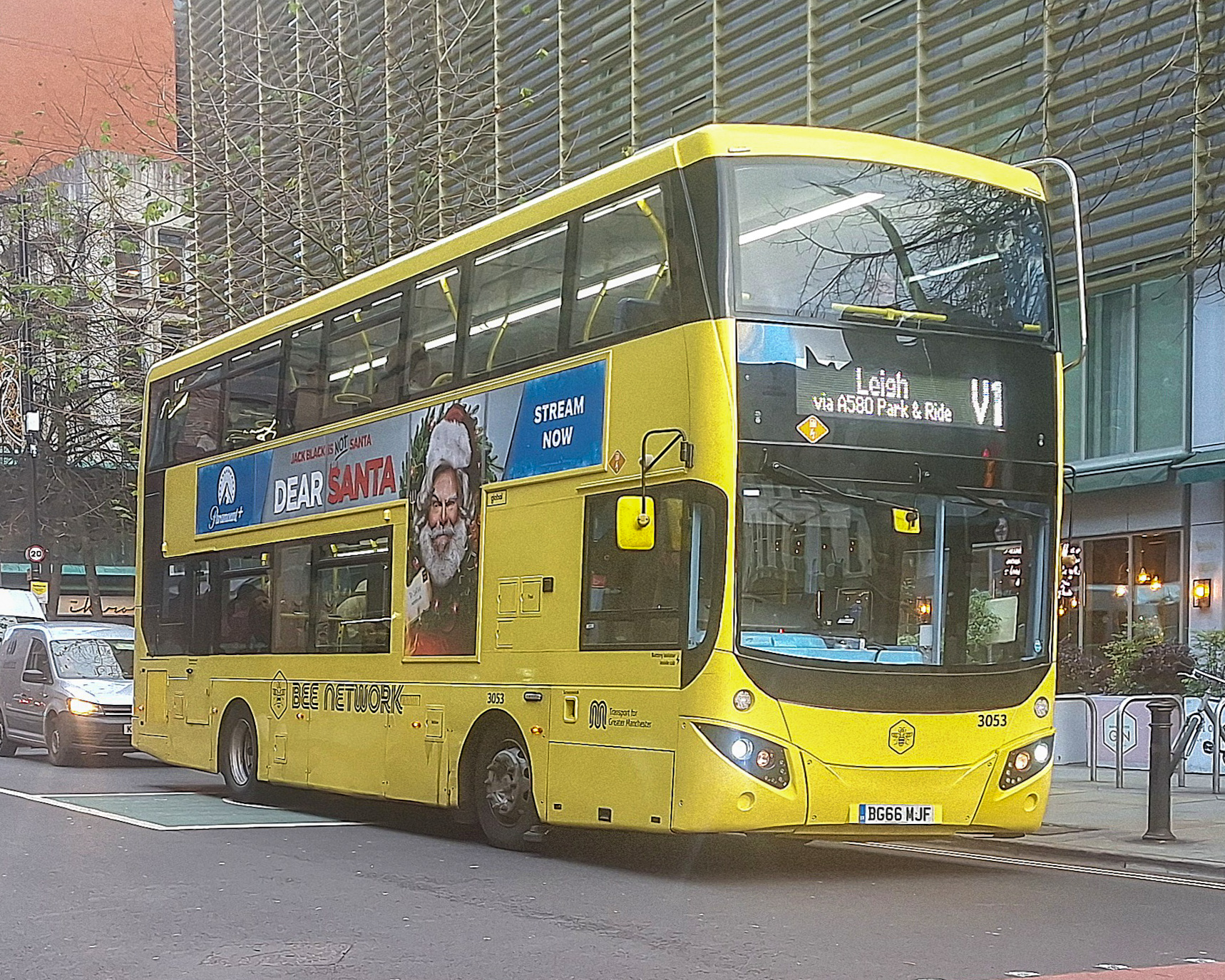
A Go North West MCV EvoSeti-bodied Volvo B5LH on route V1, December 2024

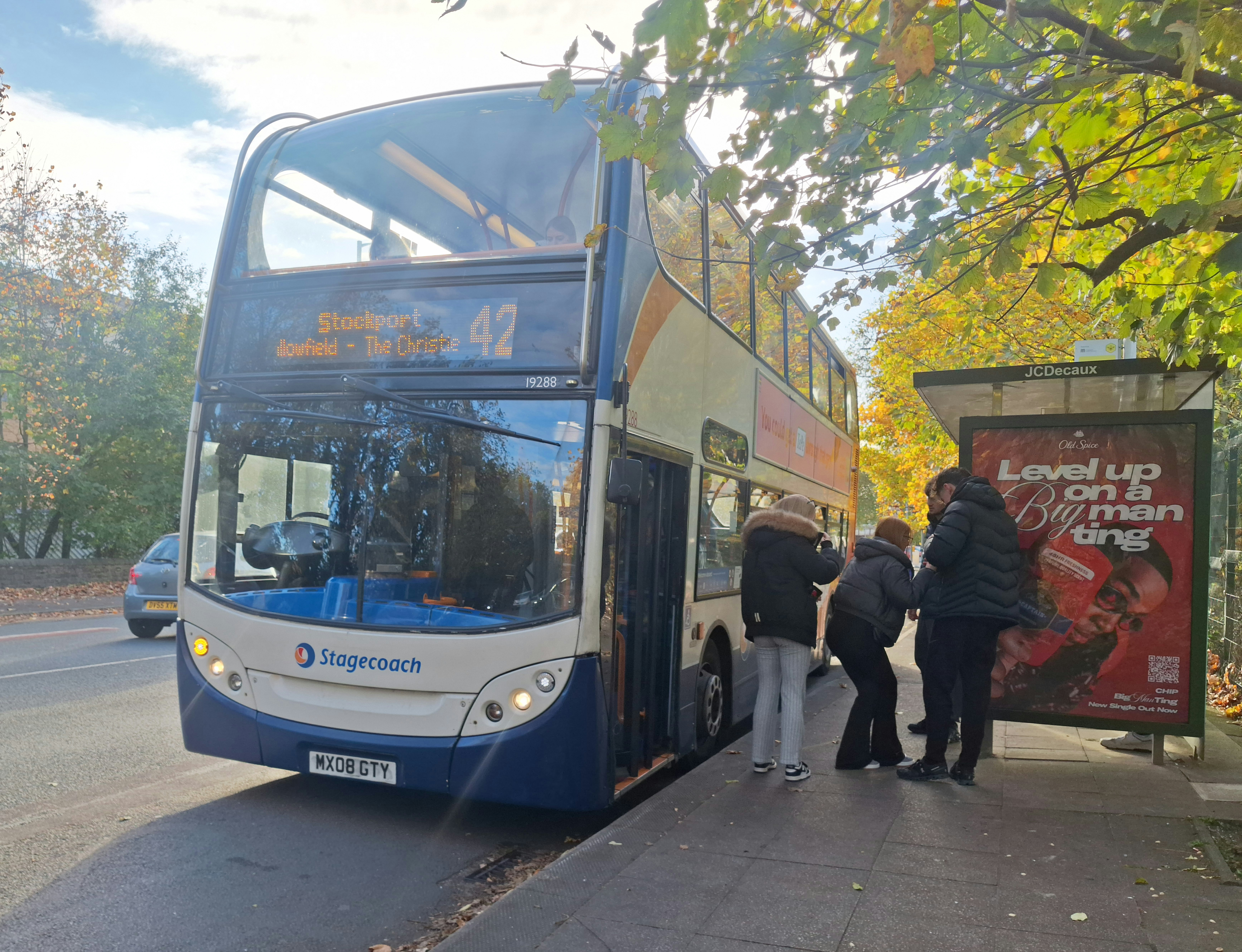
A Stagecoach Manchester Alexander Dennis Enviro400 on route 42 at East Didsbury, October 2024

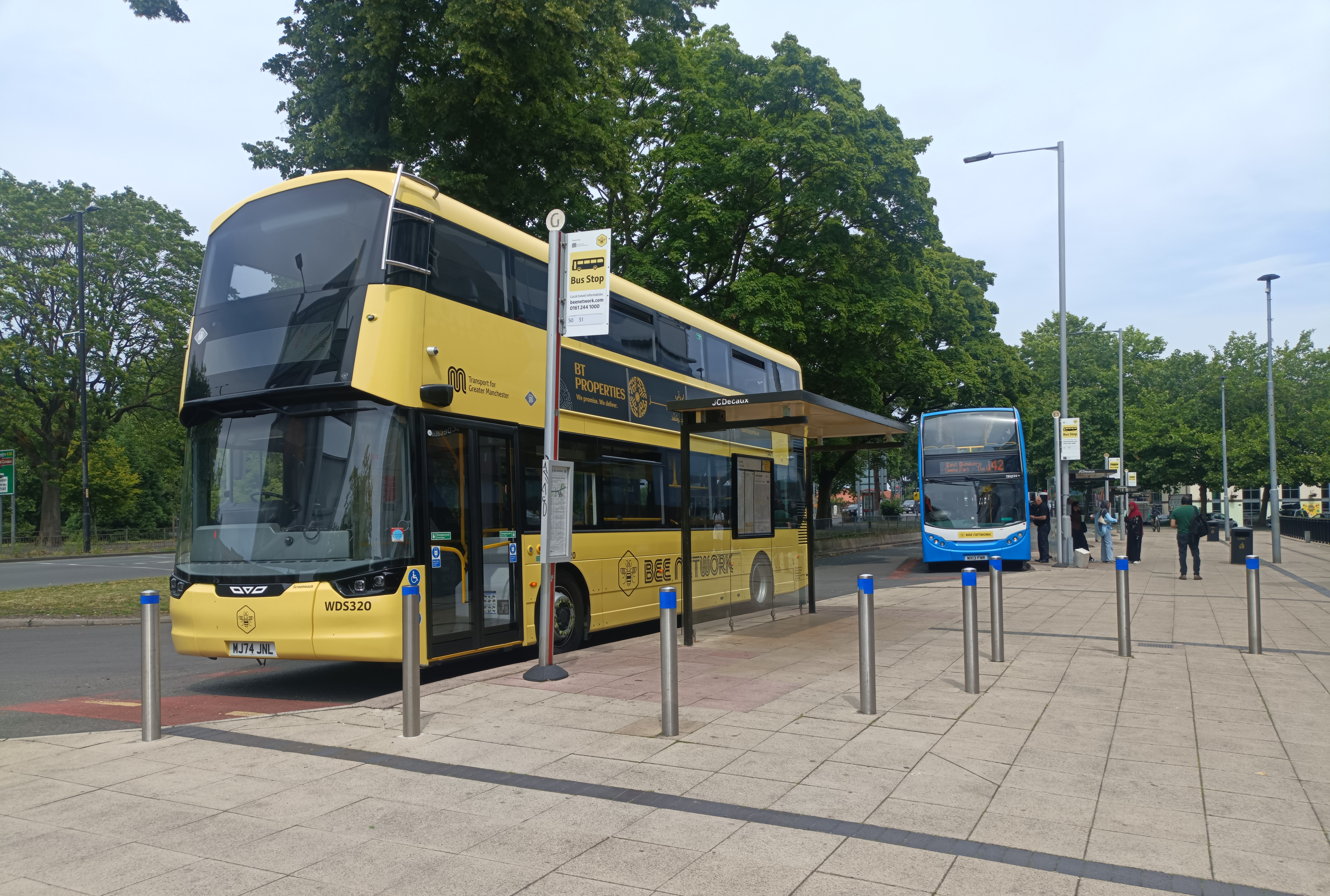
Metroline Manchester buses awaiting departure at Parrs Wood bus station, June 2025

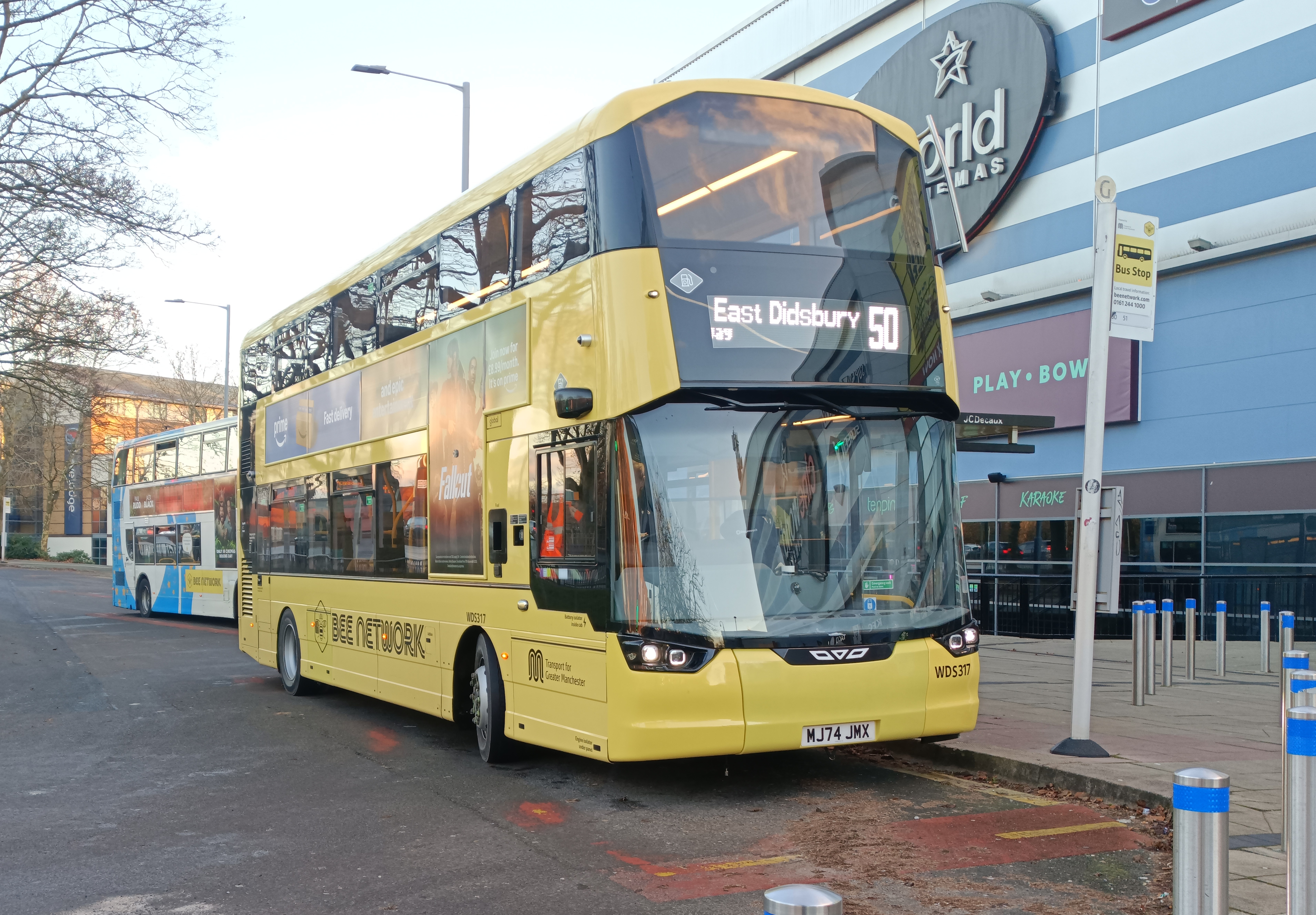
A Metroline Manchester Wright StreetDeck Ultroliner on route 50 at Parrs Wood, December 2025

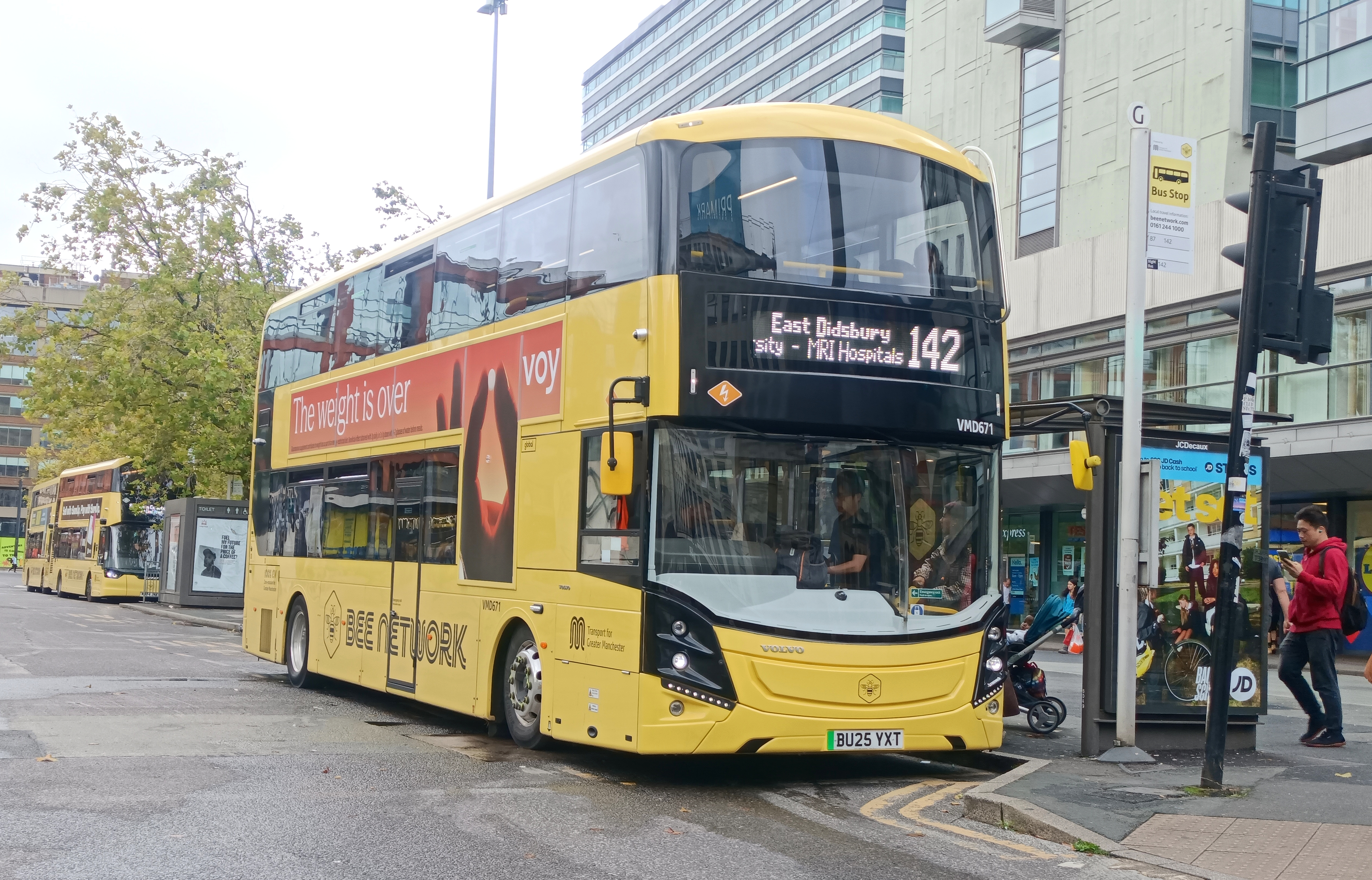
A Metroline Manchester MCV-bodied Volvo BZL battery electric bus on route 142 at Piccadilly Gardens, August 2026
