= Bullocks Coaches =

Bus and Coach operator in Manchester

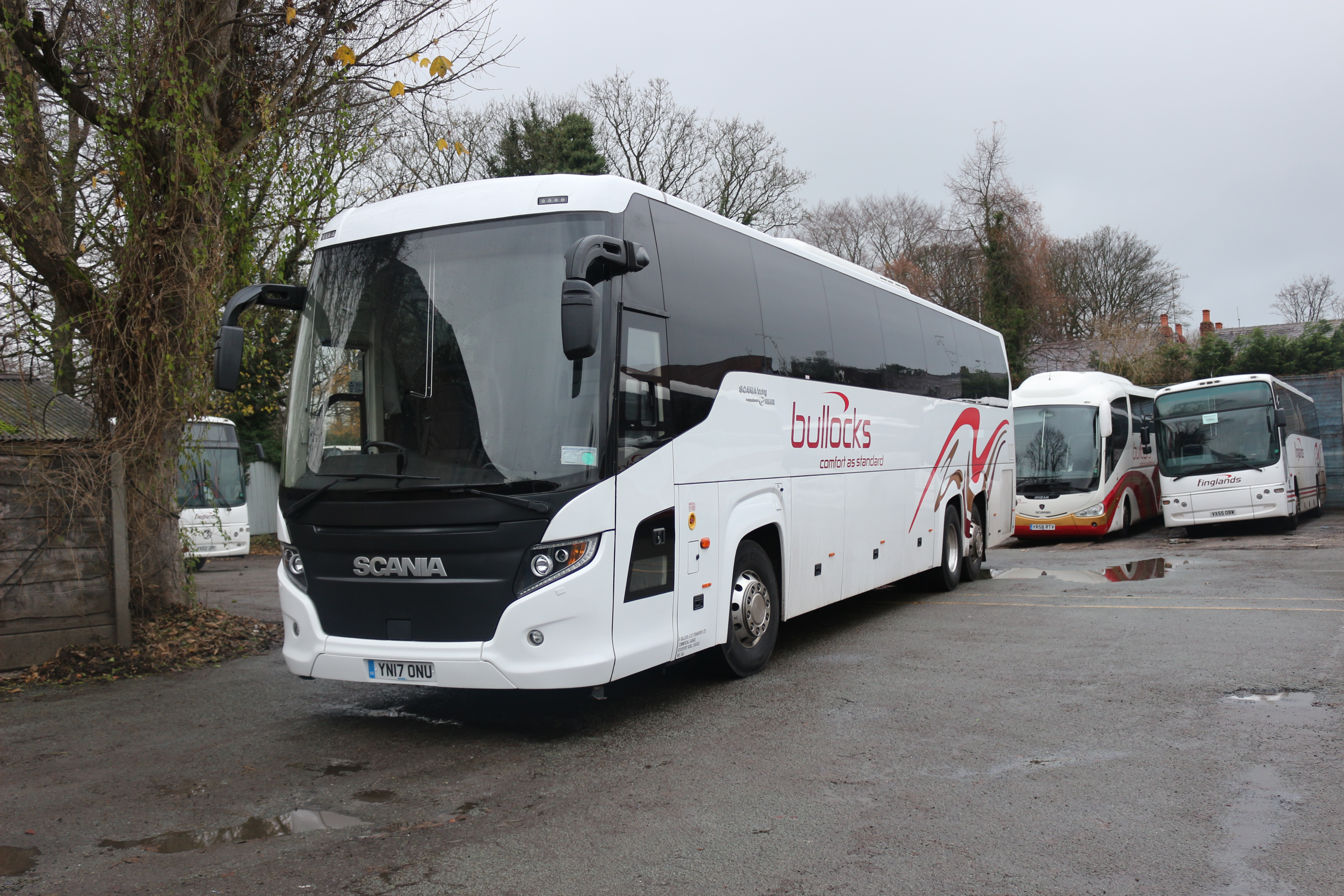
- A Bullocks Scania K410EB6, at the firm's depot
- Parent: Bullock family
- Founded: 1928
- Headquarters: Cheadle
- Service area: Greater Manchester
- Service type: Bus & coach services
- Fleet: 39 (September 2013)
- Website: www.bullockscoaches.com

Bullocks Coaches is a bus and coach operator in Cheadle, Greater Manchester.

== History ==
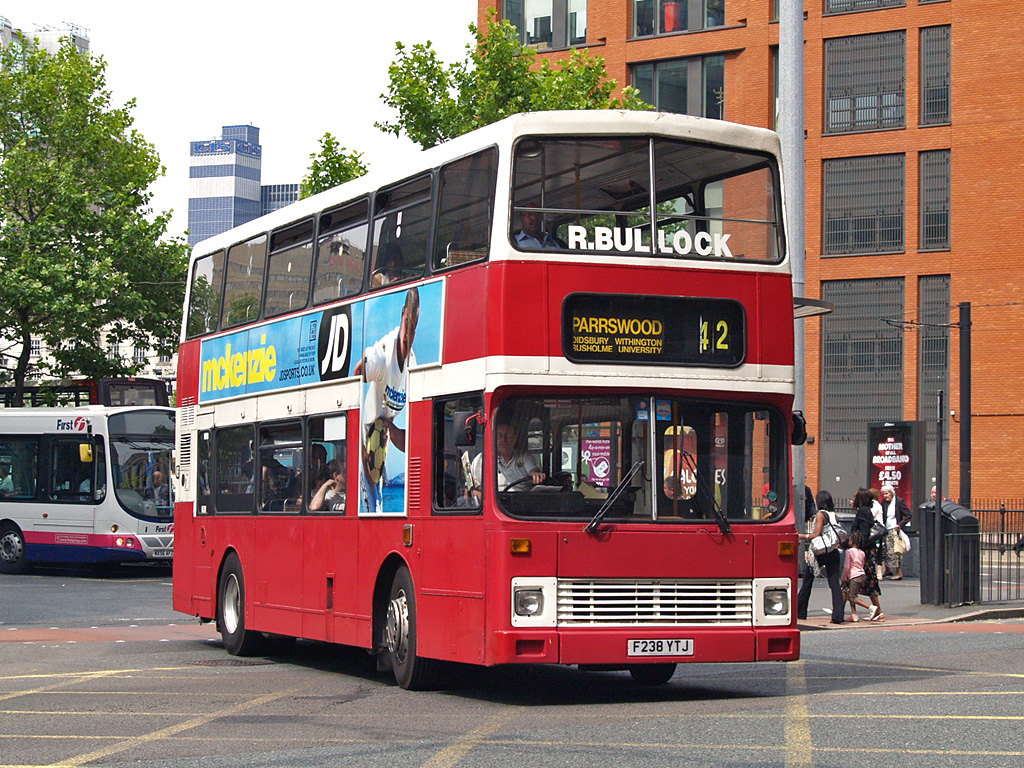
Walter Alexander RL bodied Leyland Olympian in Manchester on route 42 in July 2008.

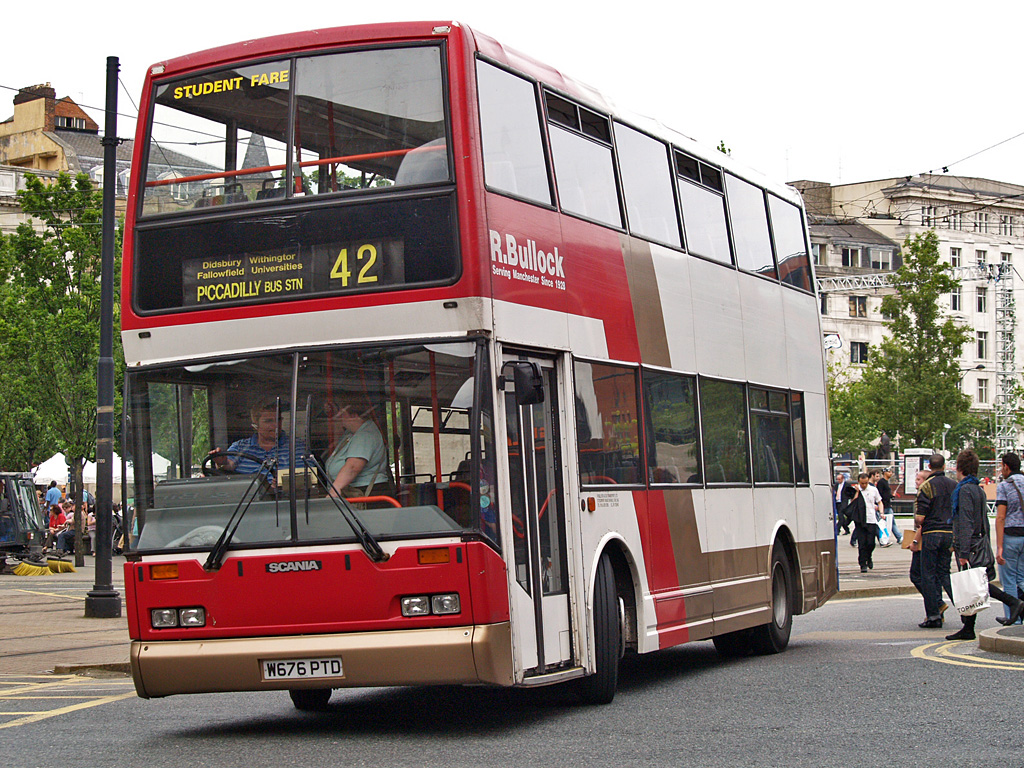
East Lancs Cityzen bodied Scania N113DRB at Manchester Piccadilly Gardens bus station in July 2008.

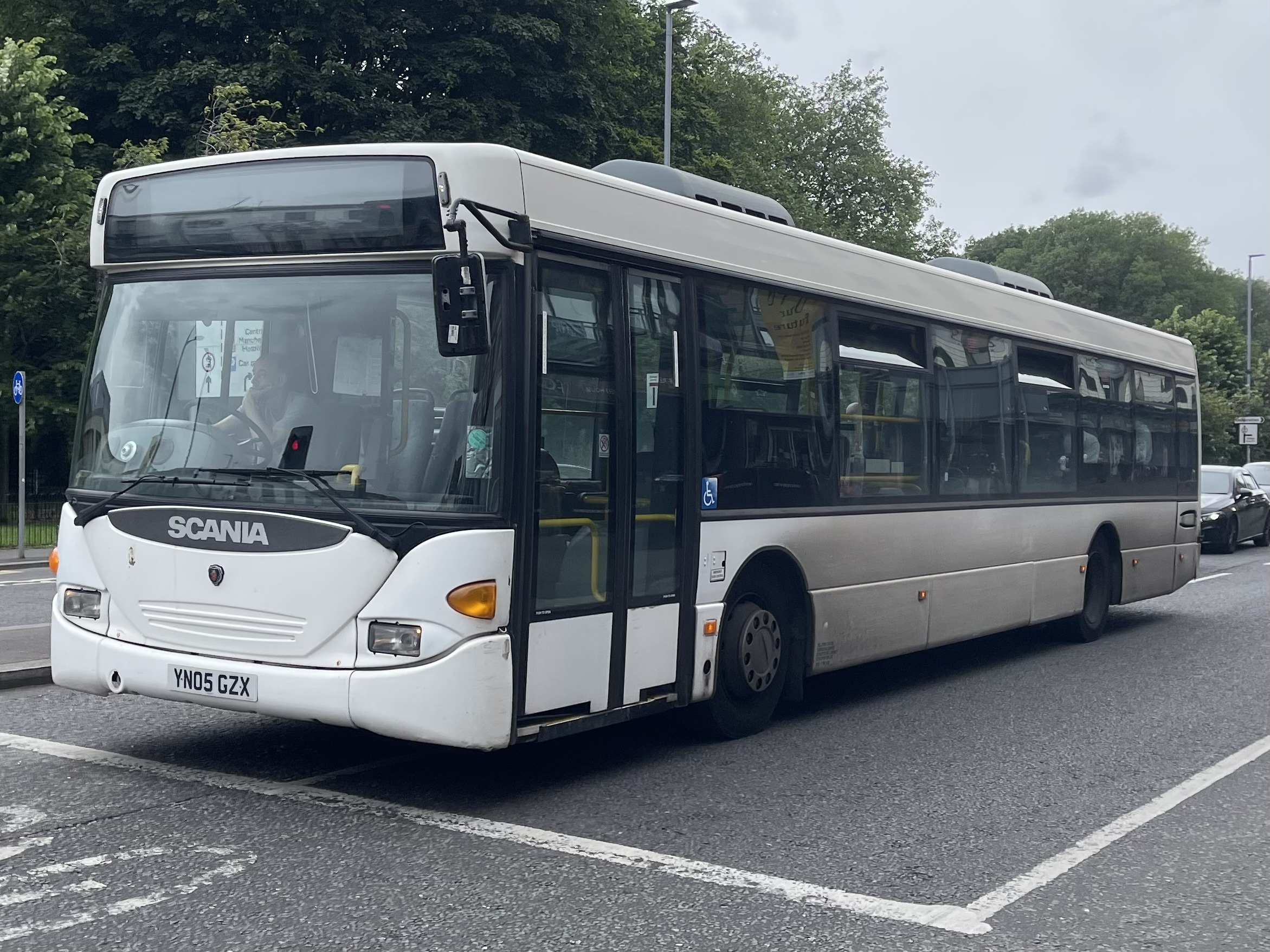
Scania Omnicity N94UB on Oxford Road in July 2024.

The company was founded in 1928 by Ralph Bullock, initially as a haulage firm, with milk deliveries being the early focus. On weekends, the trucks turned into cloth-top charabancs for trips to the seaside. By the mid-1930s, the fleet included trucks and proper coaches, but the trucks were nationalised under the Transport Act 1947 by the Clement Attlee government, leaving only the coaches. Ralph was fond of Foden coaches and the majority of the fleet throughout the 1940s to 1960s were Fodens, of which two still survive to this day. The oldest, dating from 1949, is still roadworthy and is currently on loan to the Museum of Transport in Manchester.

The firm remained small with around 20 vehicles, until 1986, when deregulation of the bus market allowed Bullocks to diversify. The fleet grew to around 75-80 vehicles in total with Bullocks acquiring many bus routes, and introducing new ones, including route 42 from Stockport to Manchester via Wilmslow Road. Over the years, the number of services declined having been lost to other operators. By 2008, it was operating seven routes and several school services, all except one of the commercial routes were sold off, most to Stagecoach Manchester and a couple to Arriva North West.

In August 2008, Stagecoach Manchester purchased all of the commercial bus operations of Bullocks except route 147. Bullocks continue to operate several school bus services, as well as coaches.

In October 2013, Bullocks purchased the Finglands Coachways coach charter business from East Yorkshire Motor Services.

== Services ==
Until 2018, Bullocks Coaches operated one route, the 147 Oxford Road Link that linked Manchester Piccadilly station with Manchester's main hospitals on Oxford Road. However, in September 2018, the contract for this route passed to Stagecoach, who operated the route under their Magic Bus brand until the rollout of Tranche 3 Bee Network in 2025, which acquired by the current operator, Metroline Manchester.

At the present time, the only regular bus routes operated by Bullock's are school services. Bullocks also operate the Trafford General and Wythenshawe Hospital shuttles from the Manchester Royal Infirmary.

== Fleet ==
As well as coaches, Bullocks formerly operated four Wright Eclipse Gemini 2 bodied Volvo B5Ls on route 147, In 2018 these passed to Lothian Buses in exchange for several Scania Omnicities, which will be used on school services.

As at September 2013, the fleet consisted of 39 buses and coaches.

== See also ==
- List of bus operators of the United Kingdom
