= Greater Manchester bus route 192 =

Bus route in Manchester, England

192
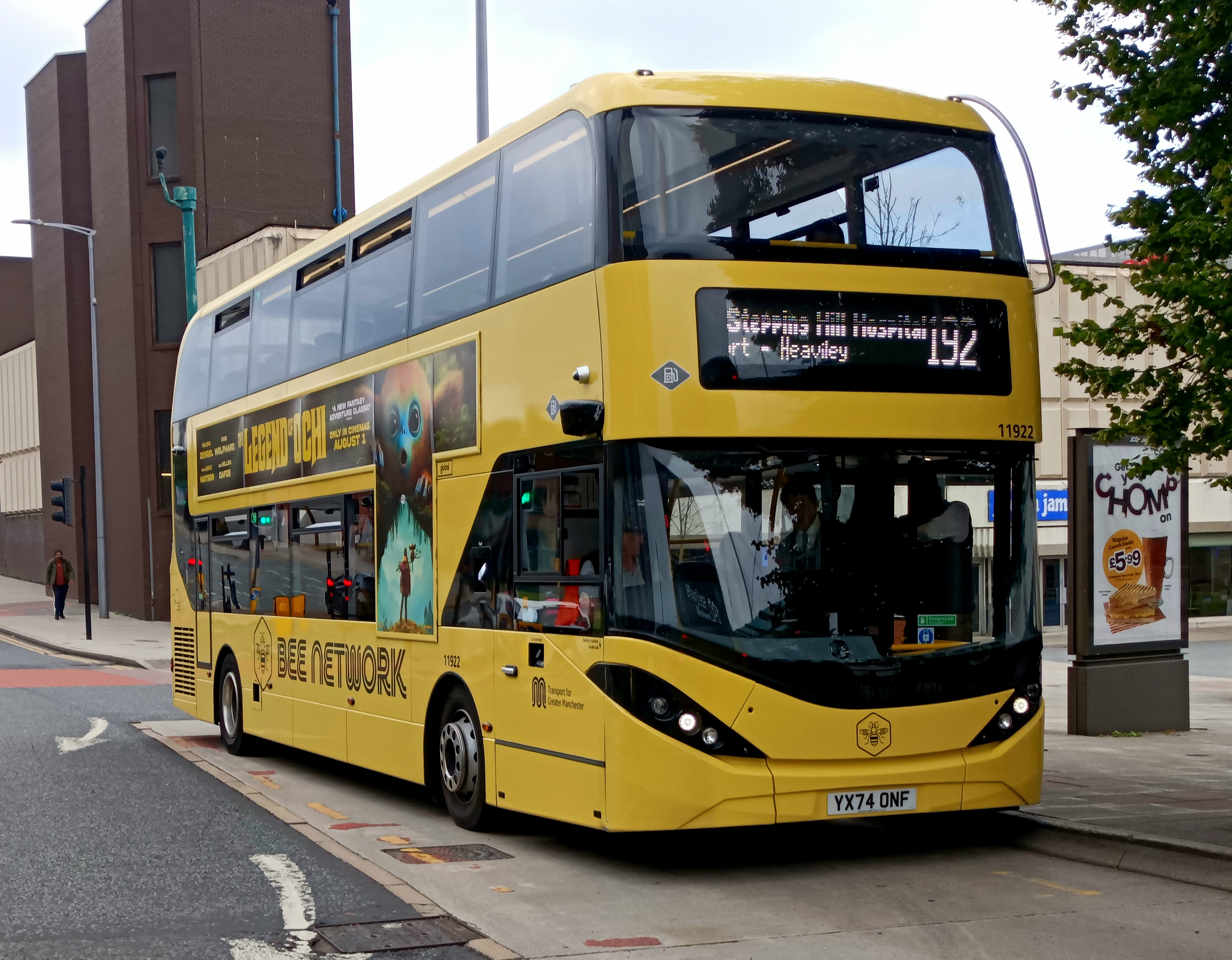
- Stagecoach Manchester Alexander Dennis Enviro400 City at Mersey Square in 2025

Overview
- Operator: Stagecoach Manchester
- Garage: Stockport
- Vehicle: Alexander Dennis Enviro400 MMC; Alexander Dennis Enviro400 City

Route
- Start: Hazel Grove Park and Ride or Stepping Hill Hospital
- Via: Heaviley; Stockport; Heaton Norris; Heaton Chapel; Levenshulme; Longsight; Ardwick
- End: Piccadilly Gardens
- Length: 9.4 miles (15.1 km)

Service
- Level: Daily, with overnight operation on Friday and Saturday nights
- Frequency: 2-10 mins (daytime); 15 mins (Midnight operation, Fridays and Saturdays only)

Greater Manchester bus route 192 is a high frequency bus route that runs between Hazel Grove Park and Ride or Stepping Hill Hospital in the Metropolitan Borough of Stockport and Piccadilly Gardens in Manchester city centre. It is operated by Stagecoach Manchester.

== History ==
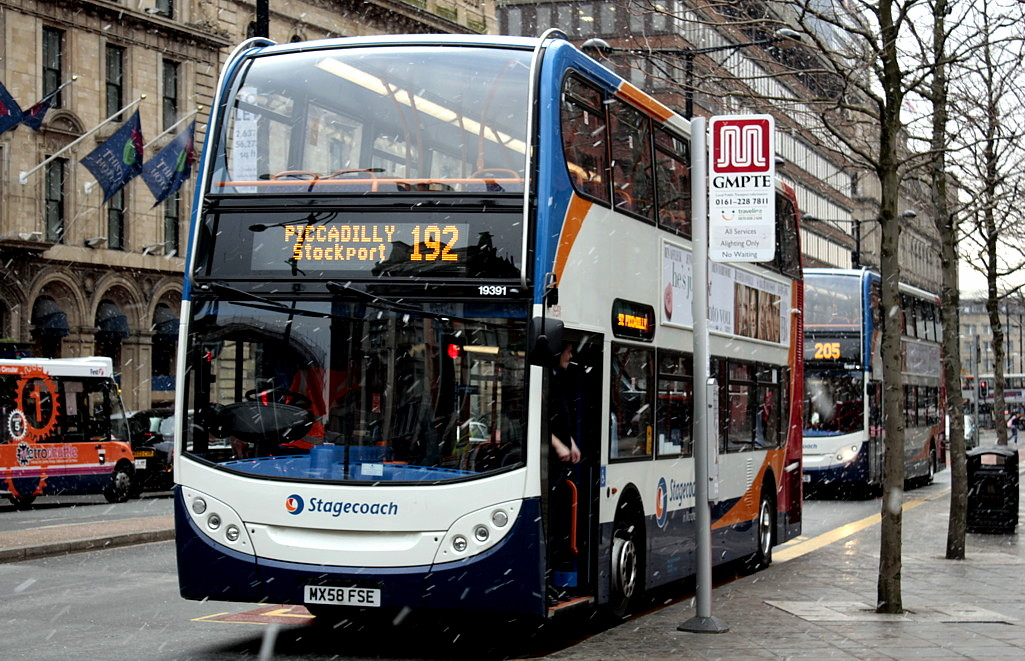
Stagecoach Manchester Alexander Dennis Enviro400 at Piccadilly Gardens in 2009

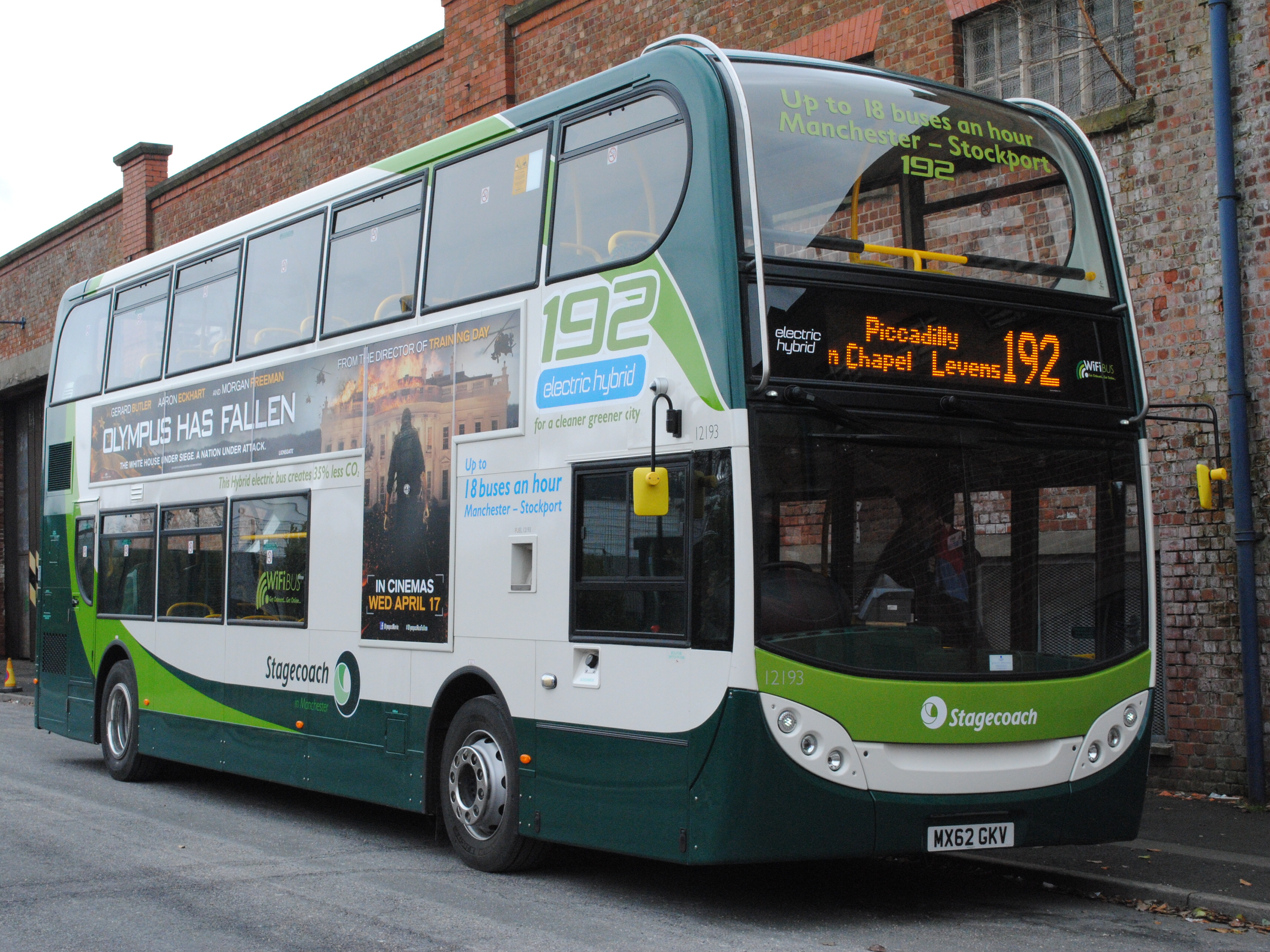
Stagecoach Manchester Alexander Dennis Enviro400H hybrid electric bus with route branding for the 192 in 2013

The history of route 192 dates back to the days of horse-drawn trams, when a service from Torkington Road, approximately half a mile from the Rising Sun in Hazel Grove, commenced in 1889. It was operated by the Stockport Carriage and Tramway Company, with vehicles purchased from the Manchester Carriage and Tramways Company. By 1905, the council had purchased the line, and electrified it. By 1911, the line was completed to Hazel Grove, though still not a through service to Manchester. When the full route to Manchester commenced, it was initially numbered 35, with the Manchester terminus at Exchange.

It was numbered 92 on 10 January 1949, when tramway service was withdrawn and the Manchester terminus moved to Piccadilly Gardens. It was owned and operated jointly by Manchester and Stockport Corporations. On 1 November 1969, following the Transport Act 1968, both municipal operations, along with others, merged to form SELNEC. Within a short space of time, the route was renumbered 192. Over the next 17 years, the operator's title changed from SELNEC, to Greater Manchester Transport and then Greater Manchester Buses.

Following deregulation on 26 October 1986, the route was taken over by GM Buses and other operators, such as Finglands Coachways and Wall's Coaches, who introduced rival 192 services. On 31 December 1993, GM Buses was split in two; GM Buses North and GM Buses South, the latter of which became the main operator of route 192.

In February 1996, GM South Buses was bought by Stagecoach and rebranded as Stagecoach Manchester. A year later in April 1997, Stagecoach Manchester converted the 192 to a 24-hour service ran in co-ordination with Finglands Coachways, as well as introducing new Northern Counties Paladin bodied Volvo B10M single-deck buses, in place of new low-floor buses that were diverted to Stagecoach South Scotland, and further Magic Bus branded buses onto the service.

In July 2015, the 192's terminus was relocated at Hazel Grove to a newly constructed park and ride. In October 2015, a peak hour express version of the route was introduced as X92. The afternoon journeys were discontinued in January 2018.

In January 2025, the route became part of contractual tranche 3 of the Greater Manchester Bee Network, with its operator unchanged.

== Route ==
=== Full route ===
The service begins at either Hazel Grove Park and Ride or Stepping Hill Hospital, and operates via Heaviley, Stockport, Heaton Chapel, Levenshulme, Longsight and Ardwick to Piccadilly Gardens.

=== Part routes ===
In addition to the full route, which is run every 10 minutes or more during the day, there are numerous part-routes that are also run every 10 minutes between Stockport Mersey Square and Manchester all day; most of these were extended to Stockport College from 7 April 2013. It runs every 10 minutes between Stockport and Manchester in the afternoon and early evening, with journeys in the early morning and late night between Hazel Grove and Stockport. Having part routes mean that the part which is most frequently served by the route is between Stockport Mersey Square and Manchester, with a bus coming on average every 3.5 minutes.

=== Overnight service ===
Overnight services are provided on the full route between Hazel Grove Park and Ride and Piccadilly Gardens every 15 minutes on Fridays and Saturdays.

== Operator competition ==
In March 2006, UK North decided to increase its level of operation to 12 buses per hour on route 192. The route was already well-serviced, with frequencies of at least every 10 minutes. Stagecoach Manchester responded by increasing services and introducing its no-frills Magic Bus brand along the route to compete with the lower-priced UK North. The resulting bus war led to the route becoming overly congested to the point of being dangerous, forcing buses to queue behind each other waiting for passengers. The situation ceased in December 2006, when UK North had its licence terminated, due to concerns over the safety of its vehicles and the standard of training given to its drivers.

== Fame ==
According to Stagecoach, the route is the busiest in Britain, with around 9 million passengers carried annually. Transport for Greater Manchester has designated the A6 road as a quality bus corridor. In October 2008, route 192 was the first in England to have solar-powered on-street ticket machines. The machines cost around £80,000 and were installed by Stagecoach and Greater Manchester Passenger Transport Executive for a 12-month trial, enabling tickets to be bought beforehand and saving time when boarding the bus.

Route 192 bus is the subject of a musical album by the singer Dave Hulston, who was born in Longsight. The album is named "Willow and the 192" and, according to the Manchester Evening News (MEN), was set to be released in the summer of 2007.

The route is named in "Additional Driver" by the Stockport indie rock band Blossoms. The music video features the band performing on the bus.
