= UK North =

Bus operator in Greater Manchester, England

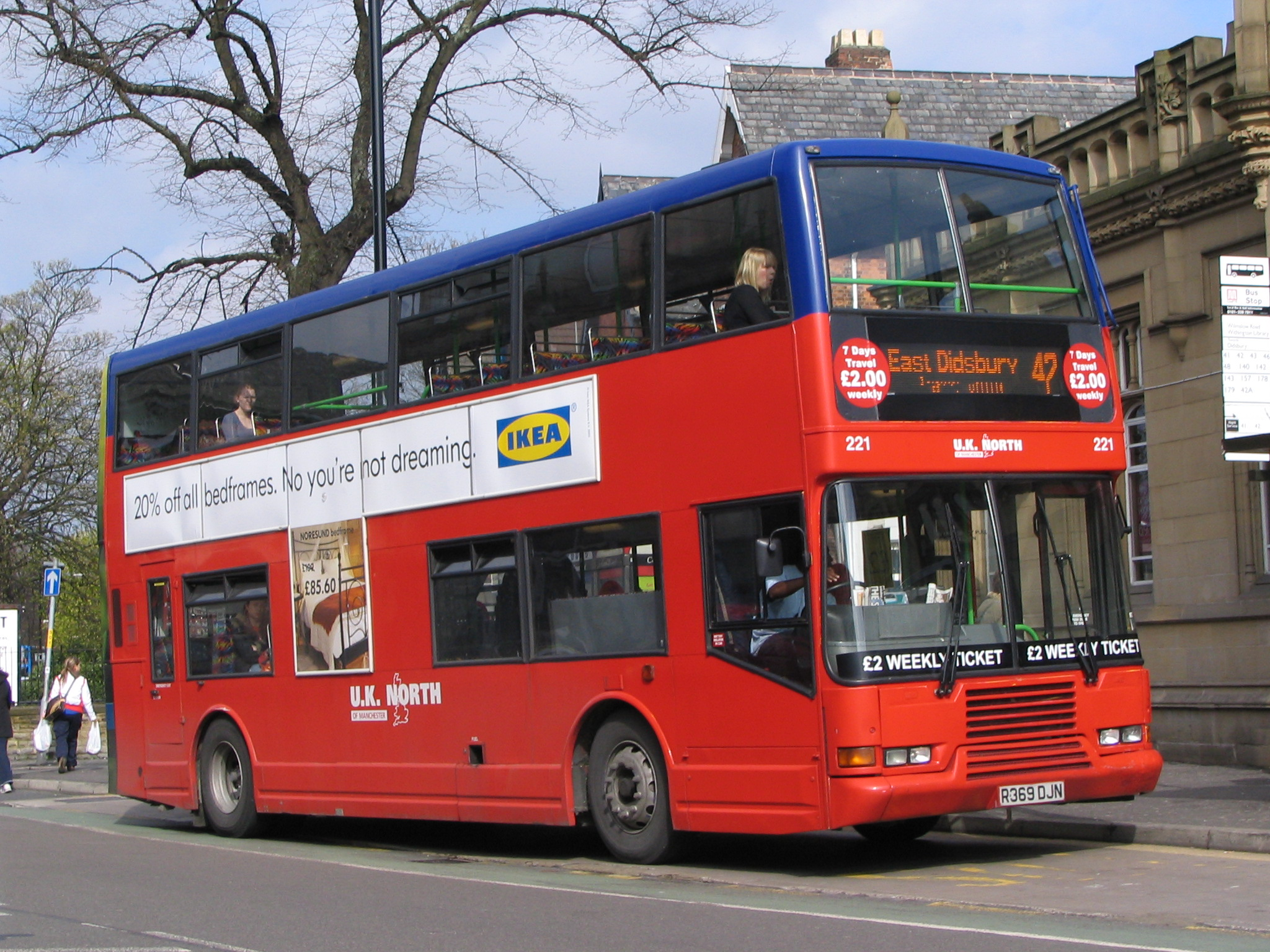
- East Lancs Pyoneer bodied Volvo Olympian on the Wilmslow Road bus corridor, April 2006
- Ceased operation: 18 January 2007; 19 years ago
- Headquarters: Gorton, Manchester
- Service area: Greater Manchester
- Service type: Bus operator
- Depots: 1
- Fleet: 74 (February 2007)
- Directors: Vincenzo Casale; David Ellis

UK North was an English bus operator in Manchester, also trading under the revived GM Buses name, which operated services on routes 42, 86 and 192, primarily in direct competition with Stagecoach Manchester in a 'bus war'.

However, this was to be short lived as services were suspended during the 2006 Christmas period from 22 December over safety fears after several buses were involved in accidents. These included the death of Martin Pilling, who fell in front of a UK North bus driven by Krzysztof Ociepa, a Polish national who had worked 19 days without rest, which crashed into the cherry picker he was working on along the Wilmslow Road bus corridor on 1 November. Other incidents included a double-decker bus crashing into a railway bridge earlier in October after the driver got lost and could not recognise warning signage and a bus being driven the wrong way down a one-way street.

After having entered administration due to financial backer Lloyds TSB pulling funding a month prior, in February 2007, UK North and GM Buses, jointly operating a fleet of 74 buses with 130 drivers, were formally banned from operating bus services across Greater Manchester by the Vehicle and Operator Services Agency (VOSA). In an inspection 28 of UK North's buses at their Gorton depot shortly before the suspension of services, 16 buses were immediately prohibited from operation due to braking and steering faults as well as suspension defects. VOSA returned to the depot as well as the home of one of the managers, Vincenzo Casale, and seized documents detailing concerns of drivers exceeding legal drivers' working hours requirements as well as 34 Notice of Intended Prosecutions served to the operator's drivers by Greater Manchester Police.

One week after the death of Martin Pilling, Vincenzo Casale as well as co-director Ernesto Casale were questioned at a public inquiry by Traffic Commissioner for North West England Beverley Bell, being asked to provide evidence of the training standards of foreign drivers, 100 of which were Polish nationals and had limited ability to speak English. Evidence, however, was not received by Bell, with UK North's directors and solicitors arguing all drivers had at least five days of training and denying any had worked excess hours. However, the inquiry was adjourned in favour of criminal proceedings after it was found that duty rosters submitted by directors Vincenzo Casale and David Ellis had been falsified, in an attempt to discredit the findings of the inquiry, and in July 2008, the two directors were sentenced to 15 months in prison at the Manchester Crown Court for conspiracy to defraud the Traffic Commissioner, with fellow director Ernesto Casale additionally charged with conspiring to create false documents.

After their release from prison, in April 2010, Vincenzo Casale and David Ellis were served lifetime bans against acquiring public service vehicle operating licences by Traffic Commissioner Bell. UK North's traffic manager Colin Walker was additionally stripped of his licence to operate by Bell.
