= Bus transport in Greater Manchester =

Overview of the bus system in Greater Manchester, England

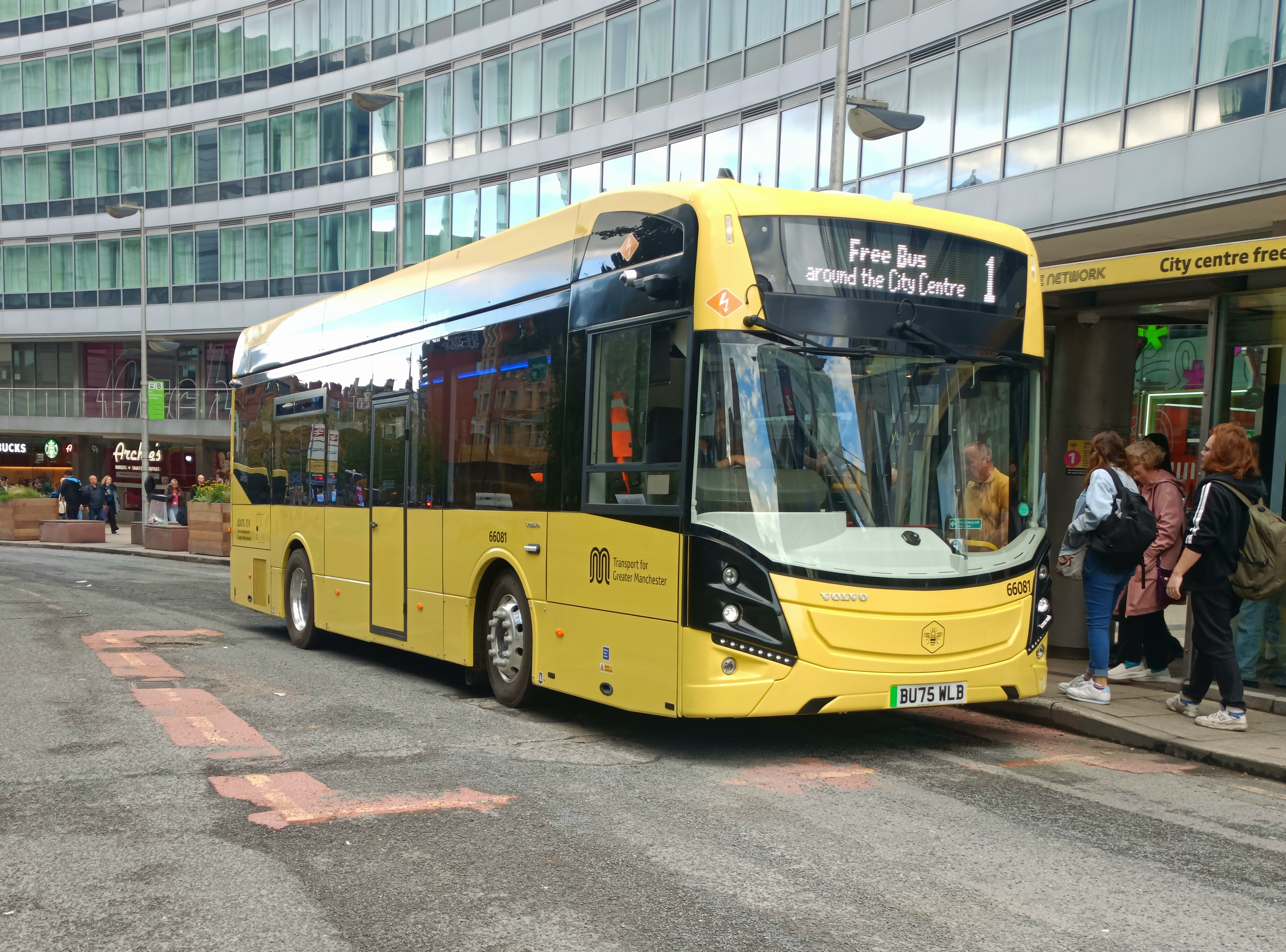
Free bus service around Manchester city centre

Bus transport in Greater Manchester is managed by Transport for Greater Manchester (TfGM), (Note: Maps of bus routes and a public transport journey planner for the Greater Manchester are on the Bee Network website.) under the Bee Network brand. The ceremonial county of Greater Manchester has an extensive bus network of 577 routes (Note: As of 2025) including the night bus service, which is one of the most extensive outside London. The bus network had an annual ridership of 145.8 million passengers in 2023.

Greater Manchester was the second county, after Greater London, to bring buses back into public control after their deregulation in 1986. The introduction of the Bee Network, after a three tranche process in 2025, saw new branding, a integrated ticketing system and new vehicles, along with other improvements, being brought to Greater Manchester's bus system.

== History ==
=== Origins ===
Buses in Manchester had their origins in 1824, when John Greenwood, the keeper of a toll-gate in Pendleton, purchased a horse and a cart with several seats and began an omnibus service. Horse buses continued to operate in the city throughout the 1830s.

By 1850, records showed that 64 omnibuses were serving the centre of Manchester from outlying suburbs, many by rival concerns. In 1865, Greenwood and the other principal operators merged to form the Manchester Carriage Company with a fleet of over 90 horse-drawn vehicles. In 1877, the company acquired the concession to operate the newly constructed tramway in Manchester and Salford, under the title Manchester & Salford Tramways.

Between 1906 and 1921, 18 new Daimler buses were introduced into the vehicle fleet. The first purpose built bus depot was opened at Parrs Wood, in East Didsbury; the bus fleet, which operated out of various tram depots, was moved there in 1923. By 1930, Manchester had a fleet of a 100 motorbuses.

=== Post-war ===
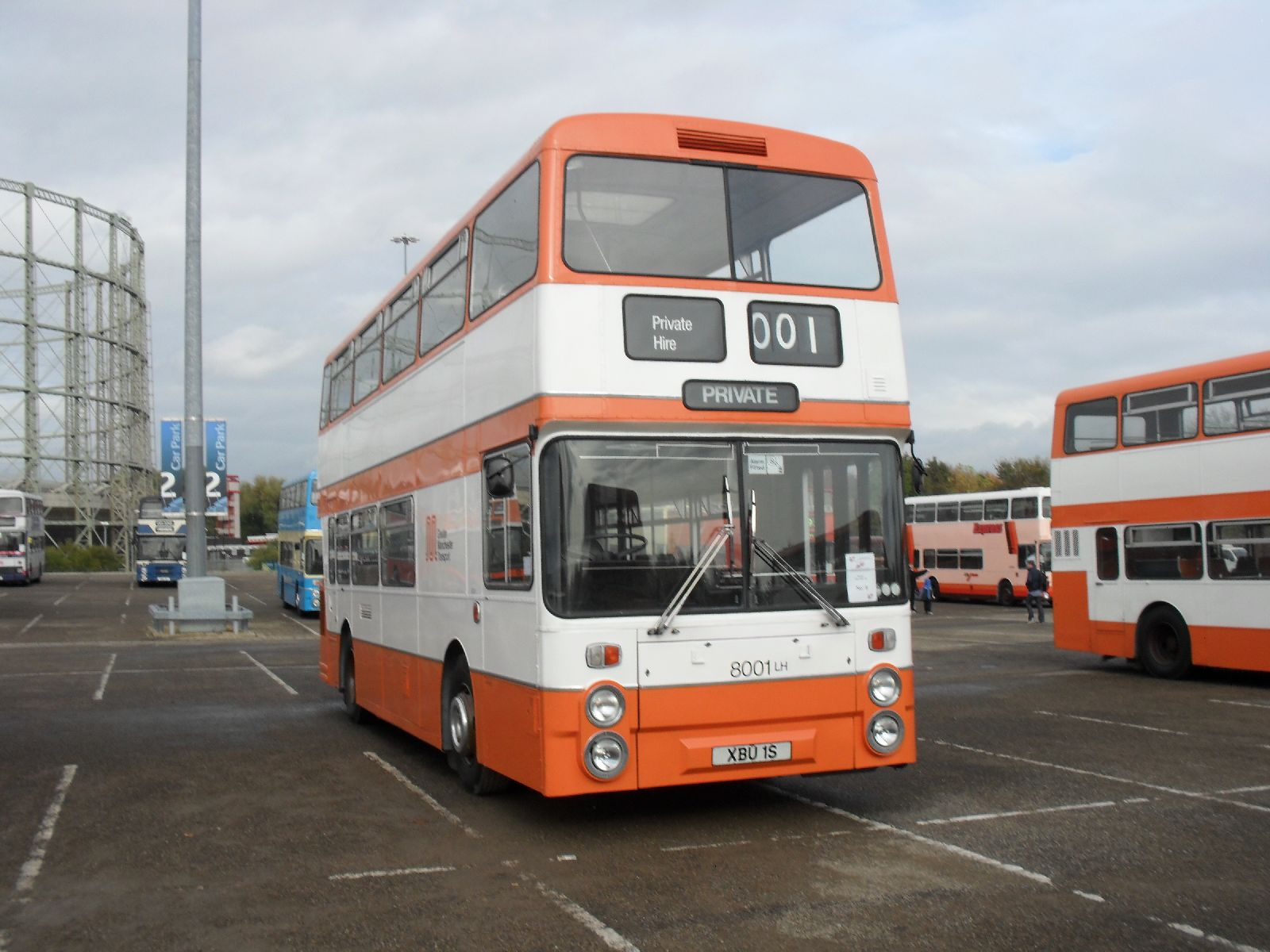
A Greater Manchester Transport bus, in the traditional orange and white livery of the 1970s

Chorlton Street bus station was opened in 1958, together with a revamped Manchester Piccadilly bus station on 4 December of the same year.

Until 1969, the conurbation surrounding Manchester was divided between the two counties of Lancashire and Cheshire, with a number of county boroughs, such as Manchester, Salford, Stockport and Bolton. To comply with the Transport Act 1968, on 1 April 1969, the SELNEC Passenger Transport Executive was formed. (Note: SELNEC stood for South East Lancashire North East Cheshire, a joint authority of the various local councils.)

In 1974, Greater Manchester Passenger Transport Executive (GMPTE) public body was established; it became responsible for public transport in Greater Manchester.

=== Modern era ===
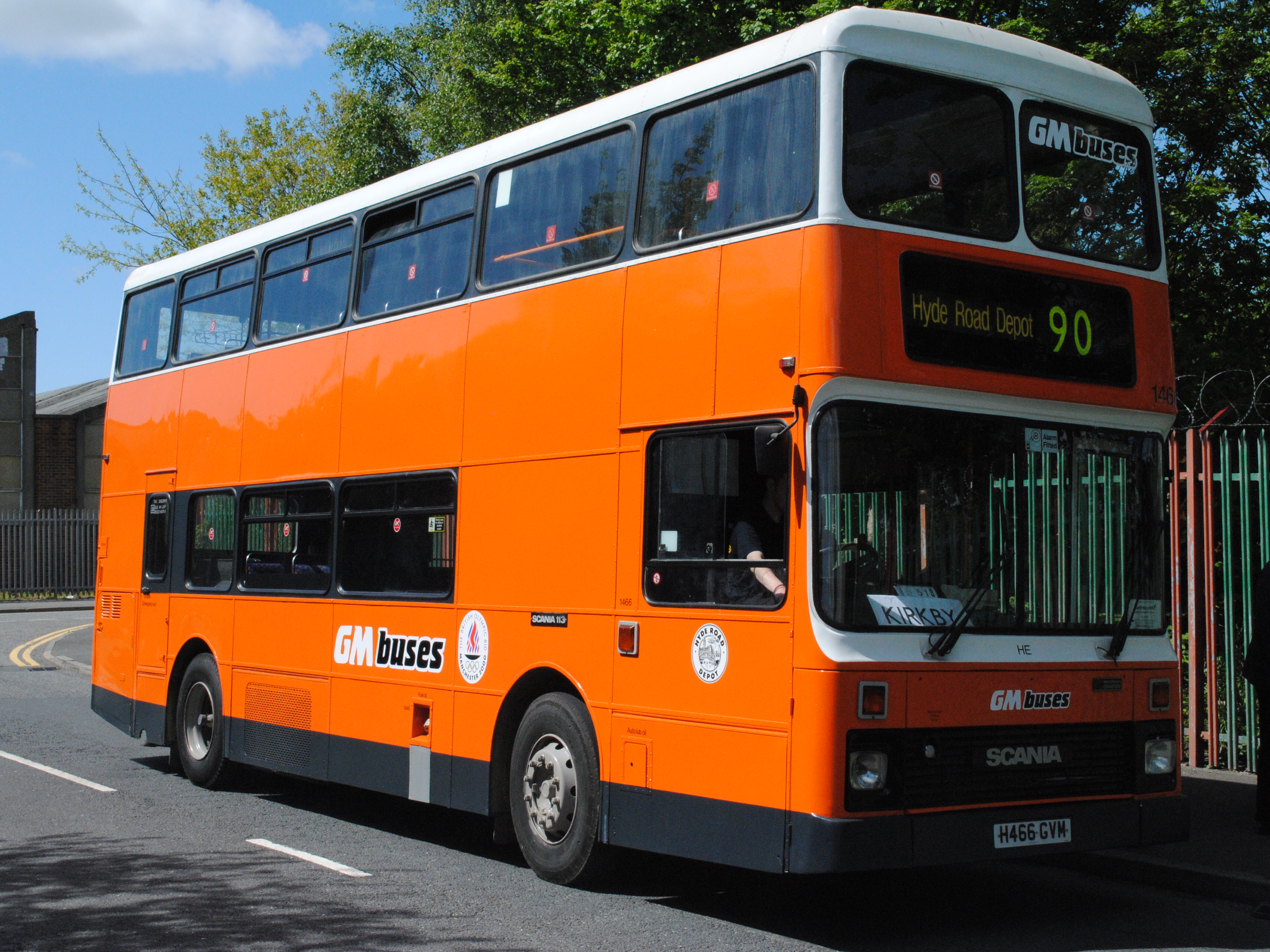
A preserved Scania N113DRB in the GM Buses livery of the early 1990s

Following bus deregulation on 26 October 1986, there was no compulsion for operators to use the national symbol; several passenger transport executives like West Yorkshire Metro's rapid transit and Merseyside adopted a new bus stop flag design featuring their capital M logo. GMPTE inherited their own curly M-shaped logo and began to use it from the late 1980s. It has introduced this subsequently to a new design for bus stop flags; initially used in 2002 on high-priority routes and later erected across the entire GMPTE area.

Greater Manchester bus stops were replaced over a five-year period. The older bus stop flags were based on a nationally-adopted design featuring a single-decker bus and were used across the country, with the exception of London.

The Government felt that GM Buses had a monopoly of bus services in the Greater Manchester area and wanted to increase competition. On 11 December 1993, it was split into two separate companies:

- GM Buses North, which was purchased by First Group in March 1996 and rebranded as First Manchester.
- GM Buses South, which was bought by Stagecoach Group in February 1996 and rebranded to Stagecoach Manchester.

First Greater Manchester operated a number of overground services; high frequency colour-coded services connecting Manchester with many large towns around the conurbation including Bolton, Bury, Oldham and Rochdale. The colour-coded branding was dropped largely since the start of the 2010s and are only used to advertise specific routes.

First Greater Manchester operated night buses on many of the most busy routes, but these were later dropped; the last services on most routes is on or around midnight. At their height, it operated on the 135 route between Bury-Manchester, which operates every six to ten minutes, in competition with Metrolink's Bury Line. This service was operated using only articulated buses, but they were later moved on to other services, such as the 471 on its route between Bolton, Bury and Rochdale; they have since been withdrawn.

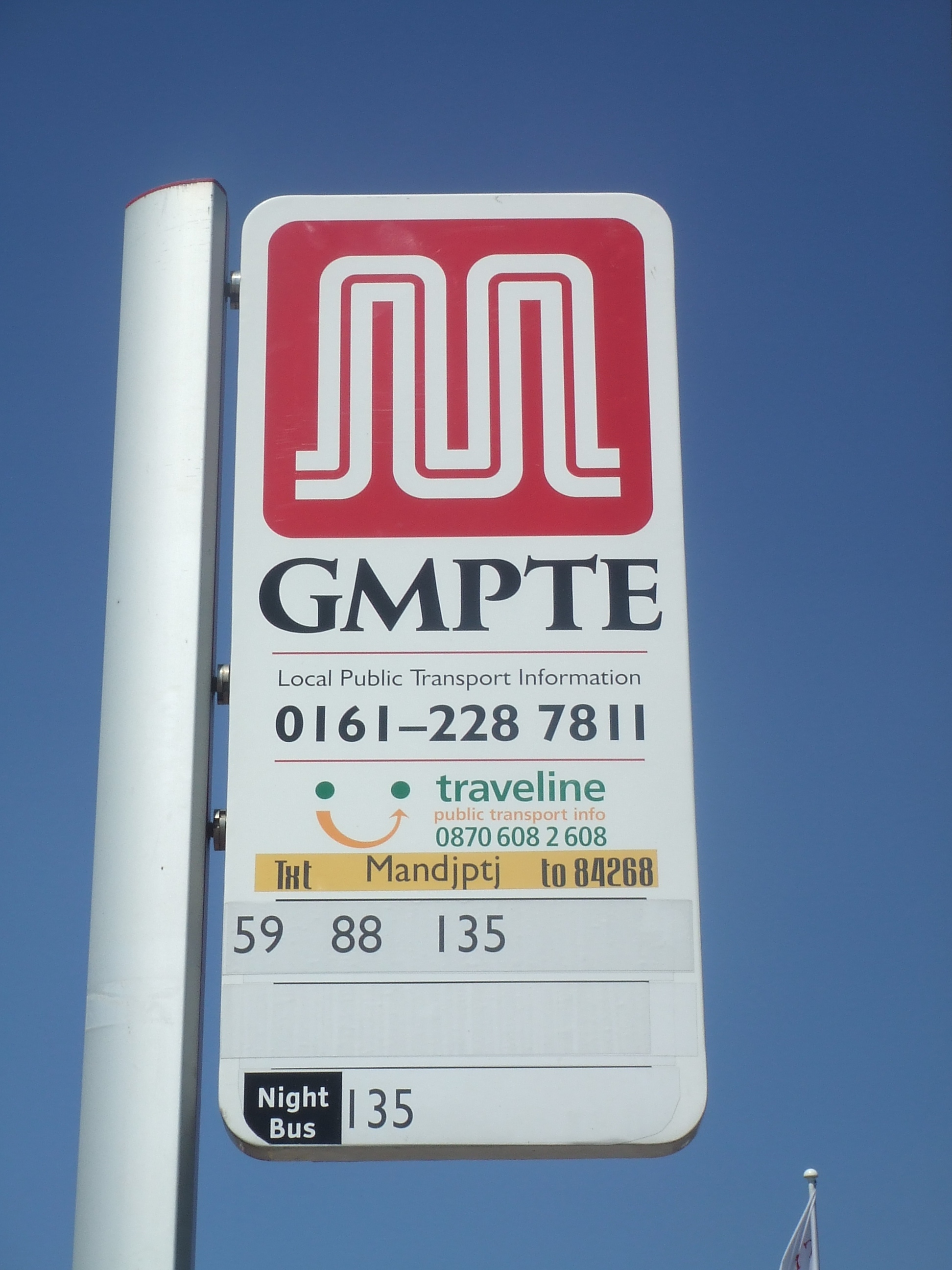
A GMPTE bus stop displaying the double M logo, 2006

In April 2011, GMPTE became Transport for Greater Manchester (TfGM); the remit of the transport authority changed and a modified M brand was implemented.

In 2021, during the COVID-19 pandemic, several hundred bus drivers in Manchester working for Go North West went on strike for two months.

=== Franchising ===
Following the enactment of the Bus Services Act 2017, mayoral combined authorities, including the Greater Manchester Combined Authority, have had the power to bring buses back under the control of local government by means of a franchising scheme. The GMCA was the first combined authority to use the powers under the Act.

The GMCA re-regulated its system in three tranches:

- The rollout of the Bee Network began from December 2022, with the awarding of two large and seven small franchises to Go North West and Diamond North West respectively in Bolton, Wigan, and parts of Bury and Salford.
- The second tranche aligned into the network on 24 September 2023
- It was completed on 5 January 2025.

=== Accidents and incidents ===
- In June 2025, a Bee Network double decker was driven at speed under a low rail bridge, shearing off the bus's roof. Fifteen people were injured, three seriously.

== Operations ==
Buses are now operated under the Bee Network brand by companies including Metroline Manchester, Stagecoach Manchester, Go North West, Diamond North West and First Greater Manchester.

=== Main bus stations ===
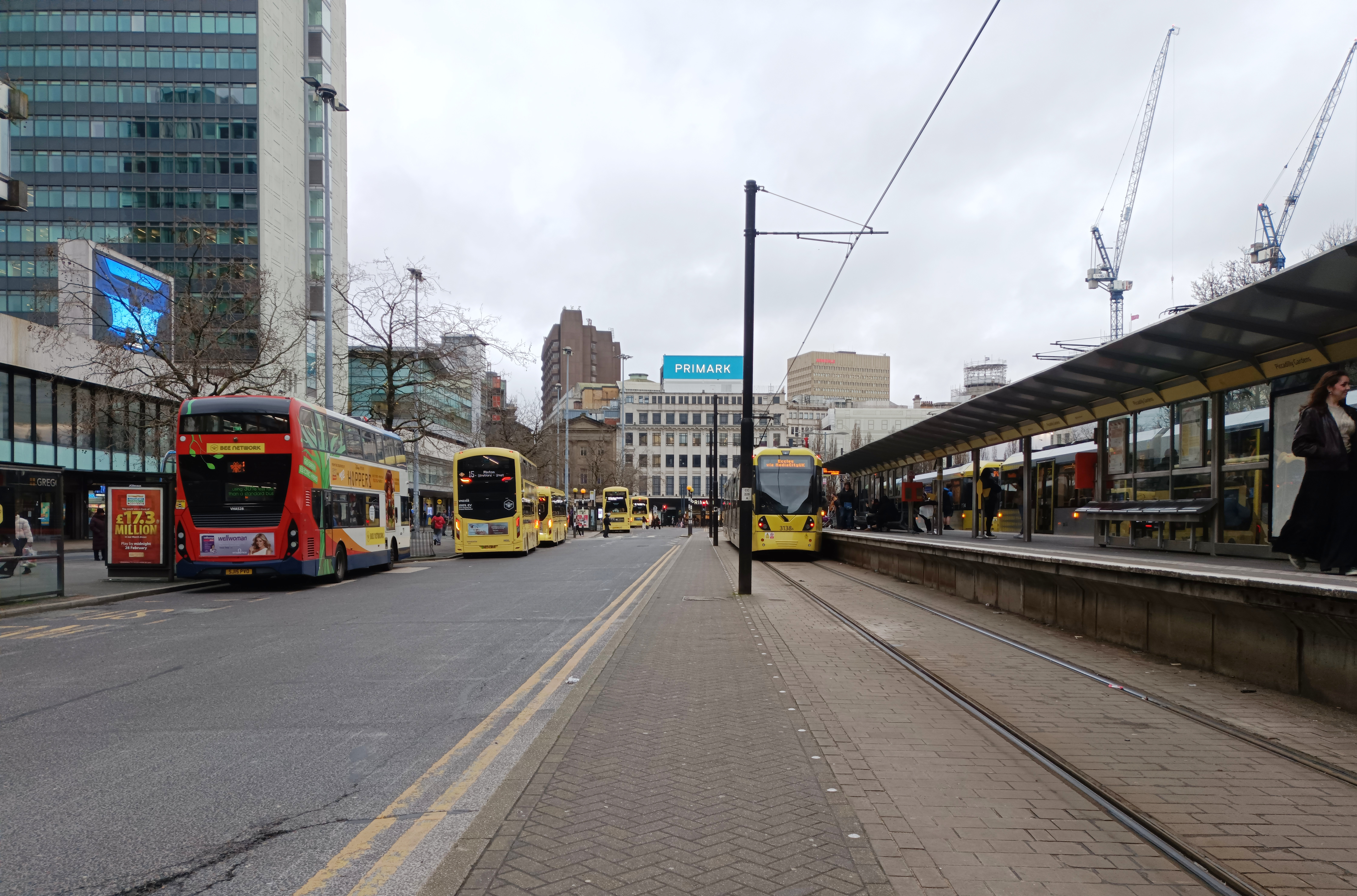
Piccadilly Gardens

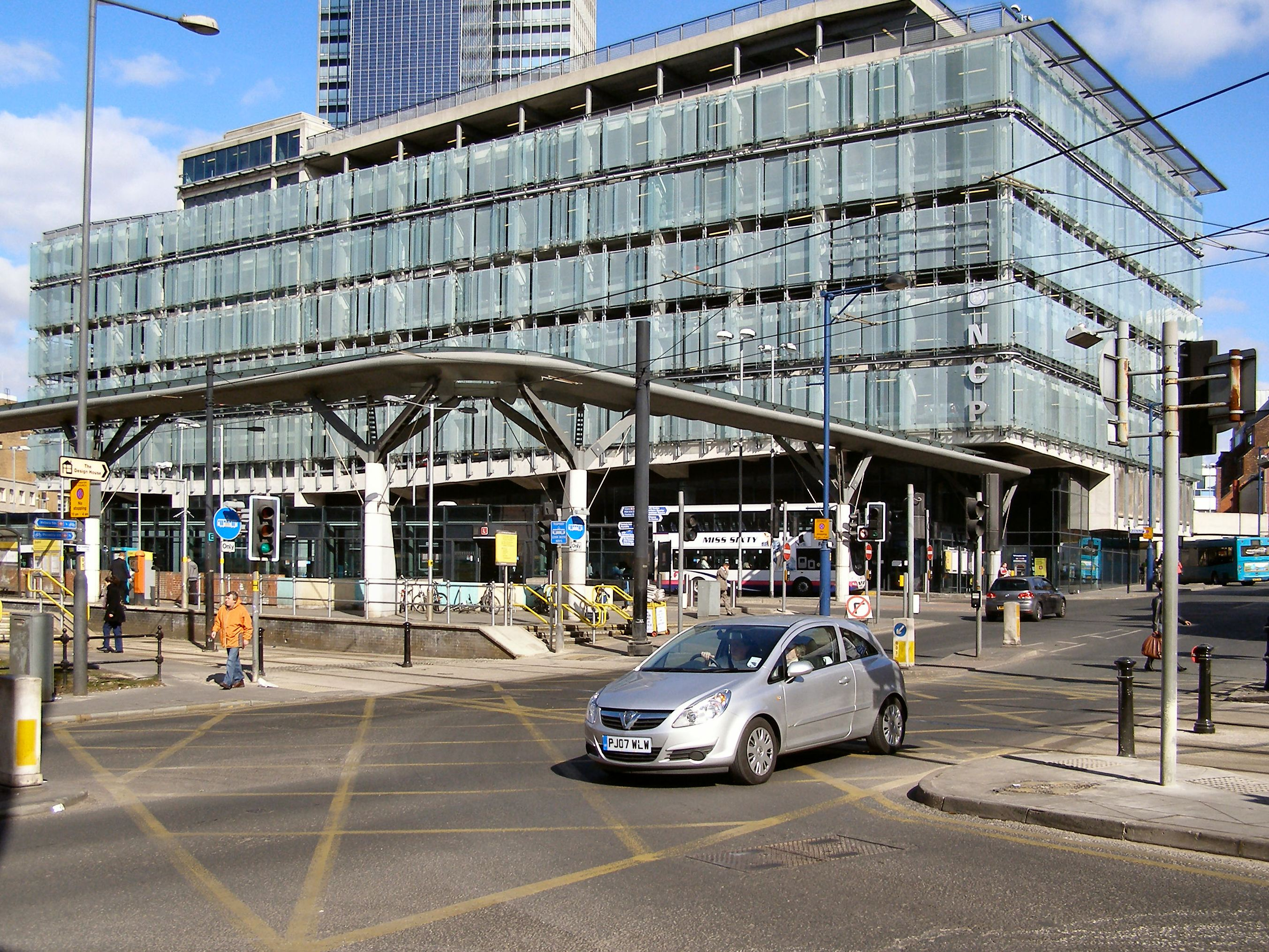
Shudehill Interchange

There are two main bus stations in Manchester city centre:

- Piccadilly Gardens is a transport interchange between Metrolink and local buses to the south
- Shudehill Interchange serves both Metrolink and local buses to the north. Flixbus uses Shudehill for its national coach services.

Chorlton Street coach station is the focal point of coach services operated by National Express and Eurolines.

=== Main bus corridors ===
The route with highest passenger volumes is the Wilmslow Road bus corridor, often claimed to be "one of the busiest bus corridors in Europe."

Other key bus corridors include:

- A6 Stockport Road between Manchester and Hazel Grove
- A62 Oldham Road between Manchester and Oldham
- A57 Hyde Road between Manchester and Hattersley
- A5103 Princess Road between Manchester, Wythenshawe and the A6 corridor in Salford.

=== Services ===
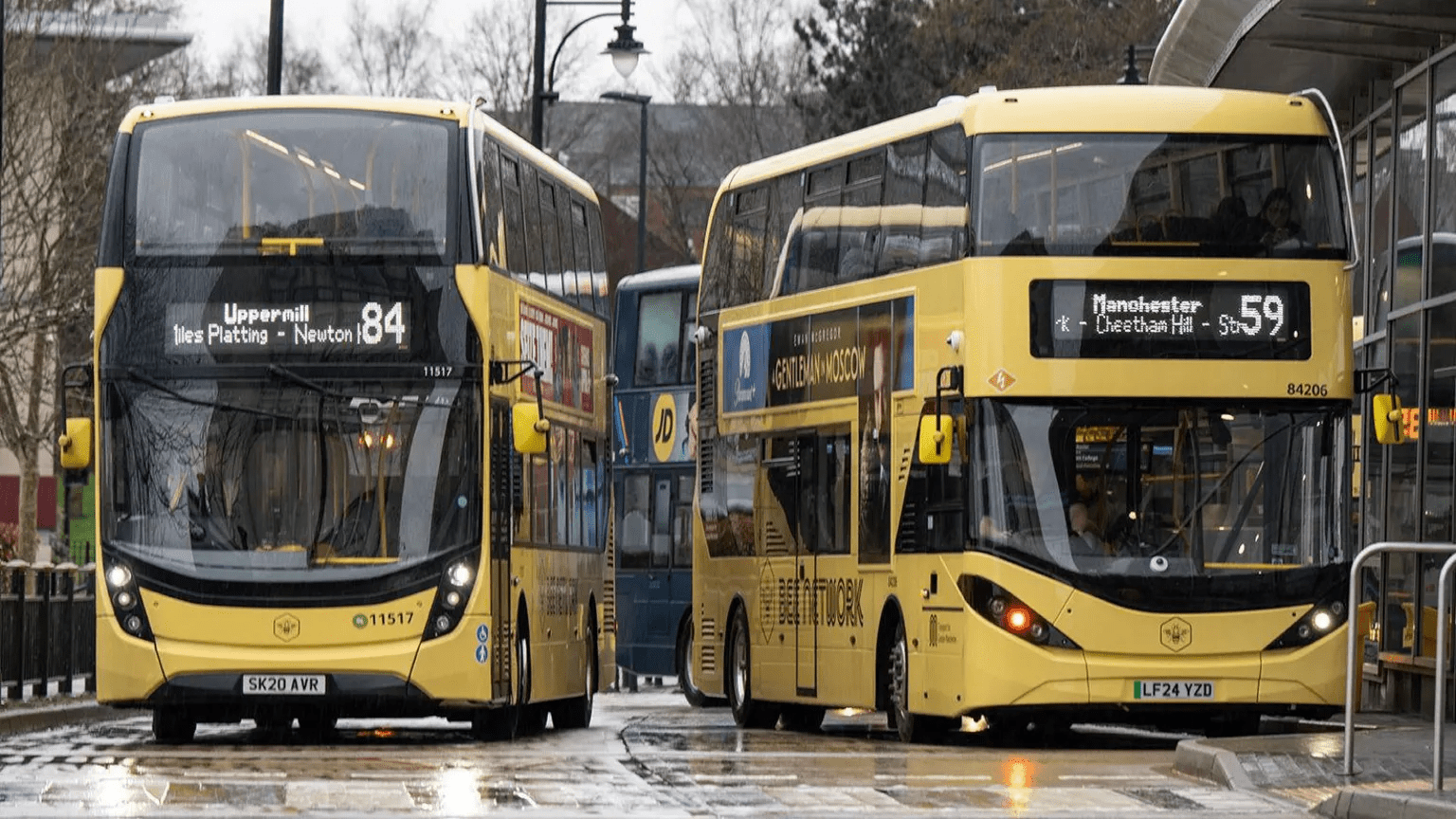
Two Bee Network-liveried buses at Oldham Interchange

Some notable bus routes in Greater Manchester include:

- 17: Shudehill - Middleton - Rochdale - Norden
- 52: Trafford Centre - Eccles - Salford - Cheetham Hill - North Manchester General Hospital - Failsworth
- 53: Salford - Cheetham Hill
- 135: Piccadilly Gardens - Cheetham Hill - Bury
- 192: Piccadilly Gardens - Ardwick - Longsight - Levenshulme - Stockport - Stockport College - Stepping Hill Hospital / Hazel Grove; it was named as the busiest in Britain in 2008, with around nine million passengers carried annually
- X41 Red Express: Shudehill - Prestwich - Ramsbottom - Accrington
- X43 Witch Way: Shudehill - Rawtenstall - Prestwich - Burnley.

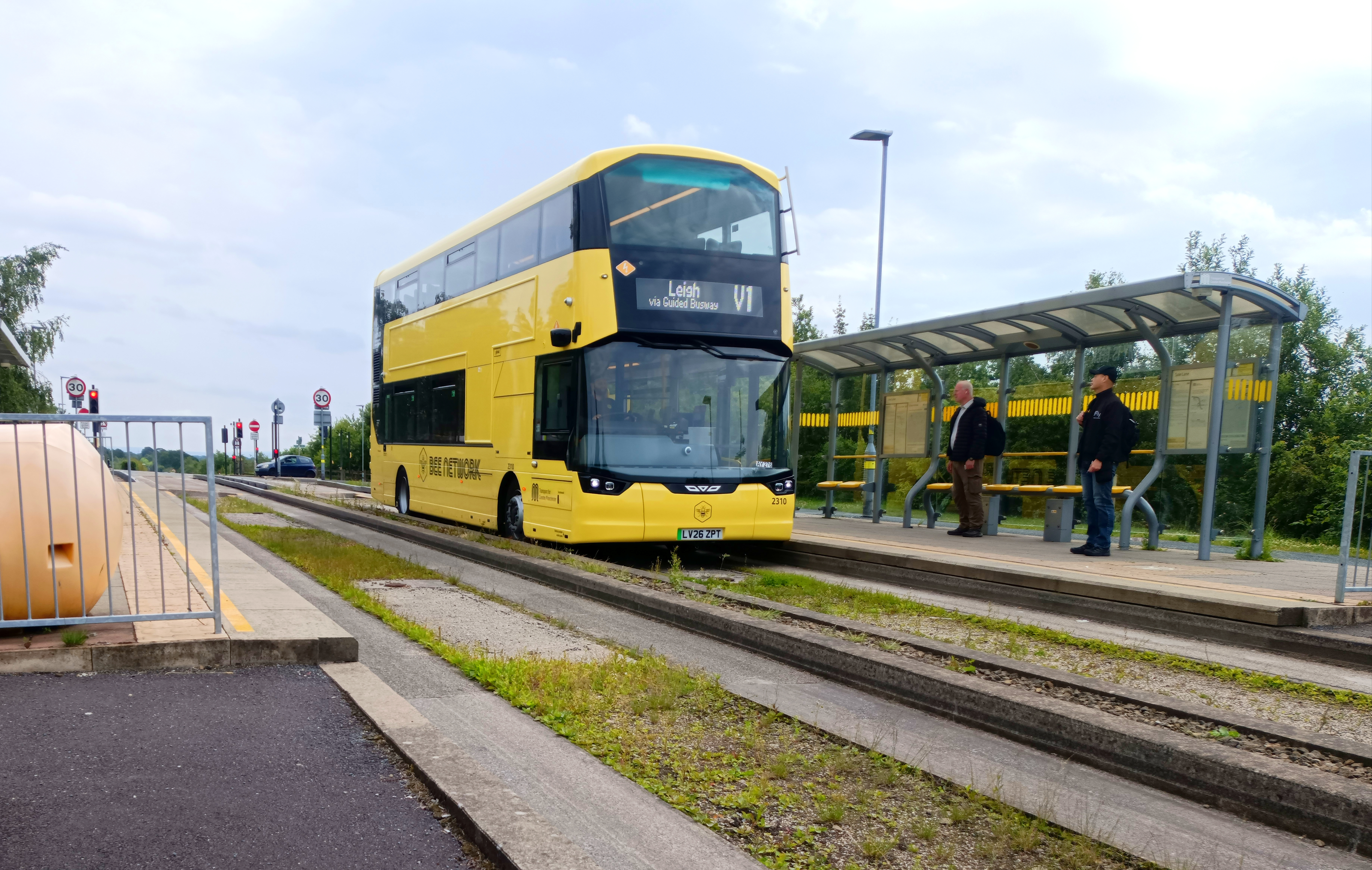
A bus on guided busway rapid transit

Rapid transit routes on the Leigh-Salford-Manchester Bus Rapid Transit are the V1, V2 and V4.

Free bus services are also provided in the city centre. From 28 October 2018, due to declining passenger numbers, it was reduced to two routes and rebranded as Free Bus.

The night bus network includes the following routes: 43, 86, 103, 112, 142, 143, 192, 201, 203, 216 and 219. Most depart from Piccadilly Gardens bus station.

=== Ticketing ===
Following an agreement between transport officials and credit unions in November 2024, a new annual bus ticket was introduced from 5 January 2025; this applies for routes that have been aligned to the Bee Network, along with a £2 "hopper fee"; this was followed by contactless fare caps in March 2025.

== Vehicles ==
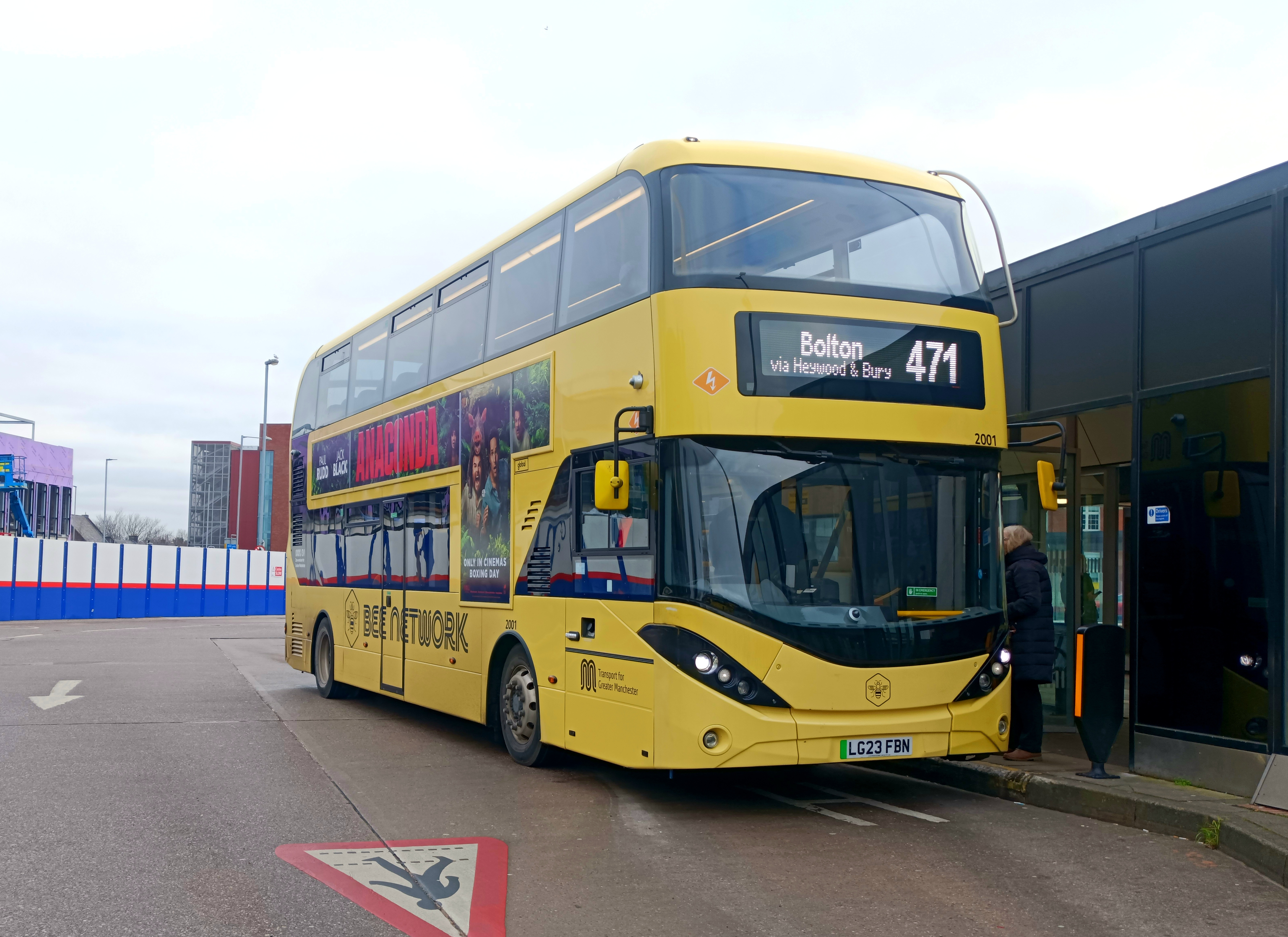
An Alexander Dennis Enviro400EV operated by Go North West in Bee Network livery on route 471, December 2025

Stagecoach Manchester introduced 30 new Alexander Dennis Enviro400H double-deck hybrid electric buses on routes 42 and 43 in September 2010. The vehicles were funded through the Department for Transport's Green Bus Fund.

The first batch of 50 BYD Alexander Dennis Enviro400EV battery electric buses were rolled out across the boroughs of Bolton, Wigan, and parts of Bury and Salford on 24 September 2023; they were allocated to the Bolton garage of Go North West. The fleet was expanded with the second batch of 50 Enviro400EV buses in the boroughs of Oldham, Rochdale and the remainder of Bury on 24 March 2024. A further order of 67 Alexander Dennis Enviro200 MMCs was secured by Diamond North West for its Bolton and Eccles garages, for use on its Leigh and Wigan services.

In a deal with Wrightbus, the Mayor of Greater Manchester, Andy Burnham, announced 50 new electric buses in March 2026, as part of a wider £66 million investment for the Bee Network.

== Future developments ==
In July 2024, the Greater Manchester Combined Authority published its Draft GM Rapid Transit Strategy, which proposed priority schemes for expansion of rapid transit of all forms across Greater Manchester up to the year 2040.

== See also ==
- Bee Network
- Greater Manchester Passenger Transport Executive
- Transport in Manchester.
