= Middleton bus station =

Bus station in Greater Manchester, England

Middleton
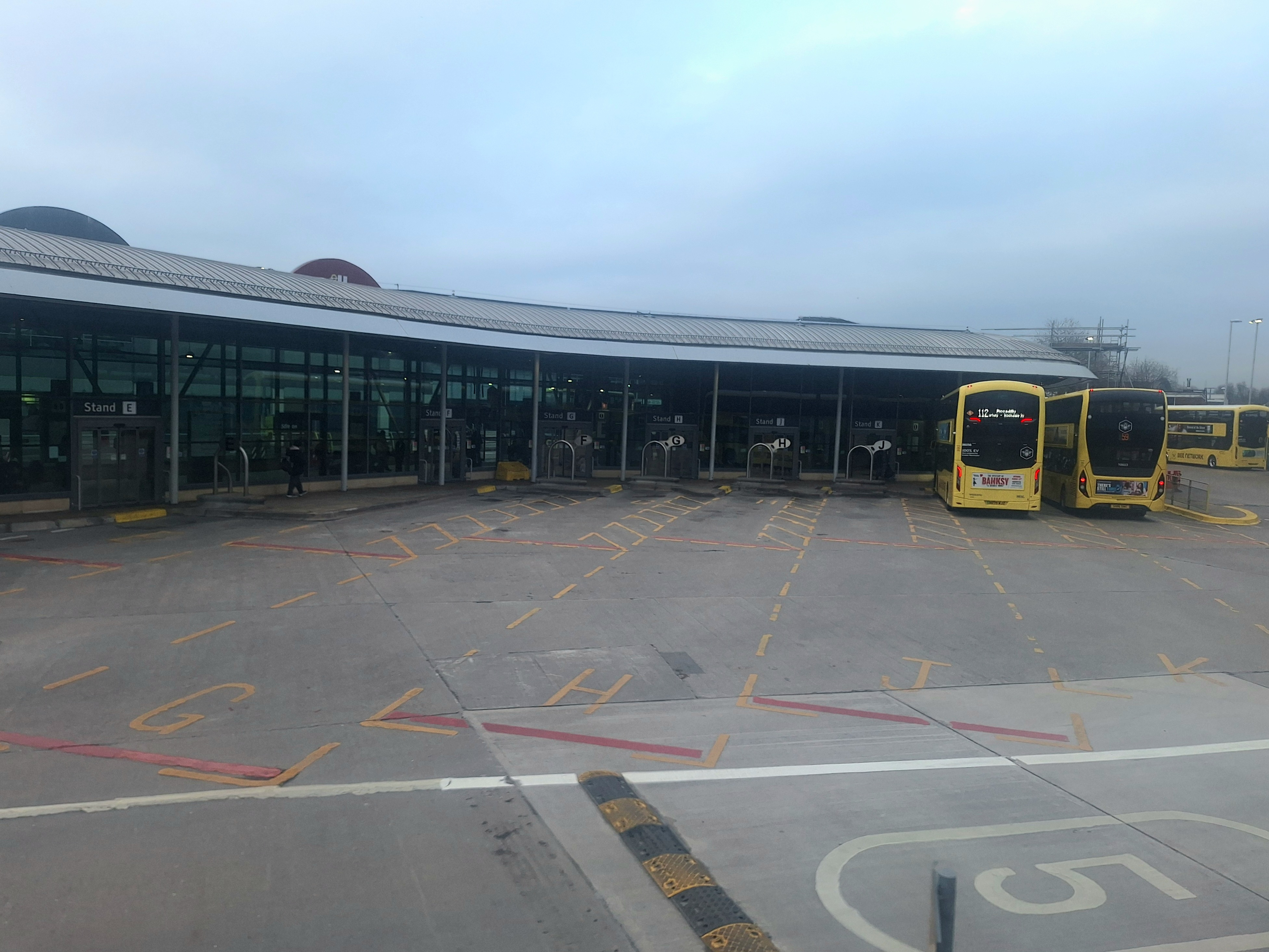
- A view of the bus station, 2026

General information
- Location: Middleton Way, Middleton, Metropolitan Borough of Rochdale, England
- Operator: Transport for Greater Manchester
- Bus routes: 117 17A 18 41 59 112 113 115 116 125 129 156 159 163 396 415 434
- Bus stands: 14 (Arrivals, A-N excluding I)
- Bus operators: Stagecoach Manchester; Diamond North West; First Greater Manchester; Go North West
- Connections: Mills Hill railway station

History
- Opened: 2005
Location

Middleton bus station serves the town of Middleton, in Greater Manchester, England. It lies next to Middleton Shopping Centre. The new bus station was opened on 31 July 2005, on the site of its predecessor, and is operated by Transport for Greater Manchester (TfGM).

== Description ==
There are 14 stands at the bus station; (Note: Arrivals and A to N, excluding I.) some operating a drive-in/reverse-out system and others operating a drive-through system.

There are two entrances: one from Park Road/Manchester New Road junction, and the other from Middleton Way from a dedicated bus lane. The only exit is onto Middleton Way, with priority signals being used to allow buses to rejoin the main carriageway.

== Routes ==
The majority of services are operated by Stagecoach Manchester, along with Diamond Bus North West, First Greater Manchester and Go North West. These routes are operated under franchise by the Bee Network.

There are frequent services around the locality, including to Alkrington, Boarshaw, Hollin, Langley, Moorclose, Moston and Rhodes; longer routes connect the town with Manchester, Oldham, Rochdale, Bury and Ashton-under-Lyne.

Key routes are:

- 17: Norden to Shudehill Interchange, via Rochdale Interchange
- 17A: Rochdale Interchange to Shudehill Interchange
- 18: Langley to Manchester Royal Infirmary; some services terminate at Shudehill Interchange
- 41: Middleton to Sale Metrolink; some services terminate at North Manchester General Hospital instead of Middleton
- 59: Oldham Mumps Interchange to Piccadilly Gardens
- 112/3: Middleton to Piccadilly Gardens
- 115: Middleton - Moston - Harpurhey - Higher Blackley circular
- 116: Middleton - Higher Blackley - Harpurhey - Moston circular
- 125: Middleton to Heywood
- 129: Middleton - Hollin circular
- 156: Middleton to Shudehill Interchange
- 159: Oldham to Middleton, via Chadderton
- 163: Bury Interchange to Piccadilly Gardens
- 396: Middleton to Ashton-under-Lyne
- 415: Middleton to Oldham, via Chadderton
- 434: Middleton to Rochdale Interchange.
