= Greater Manchester bus route 17 =

Bus route in Greater Manchester, England

17
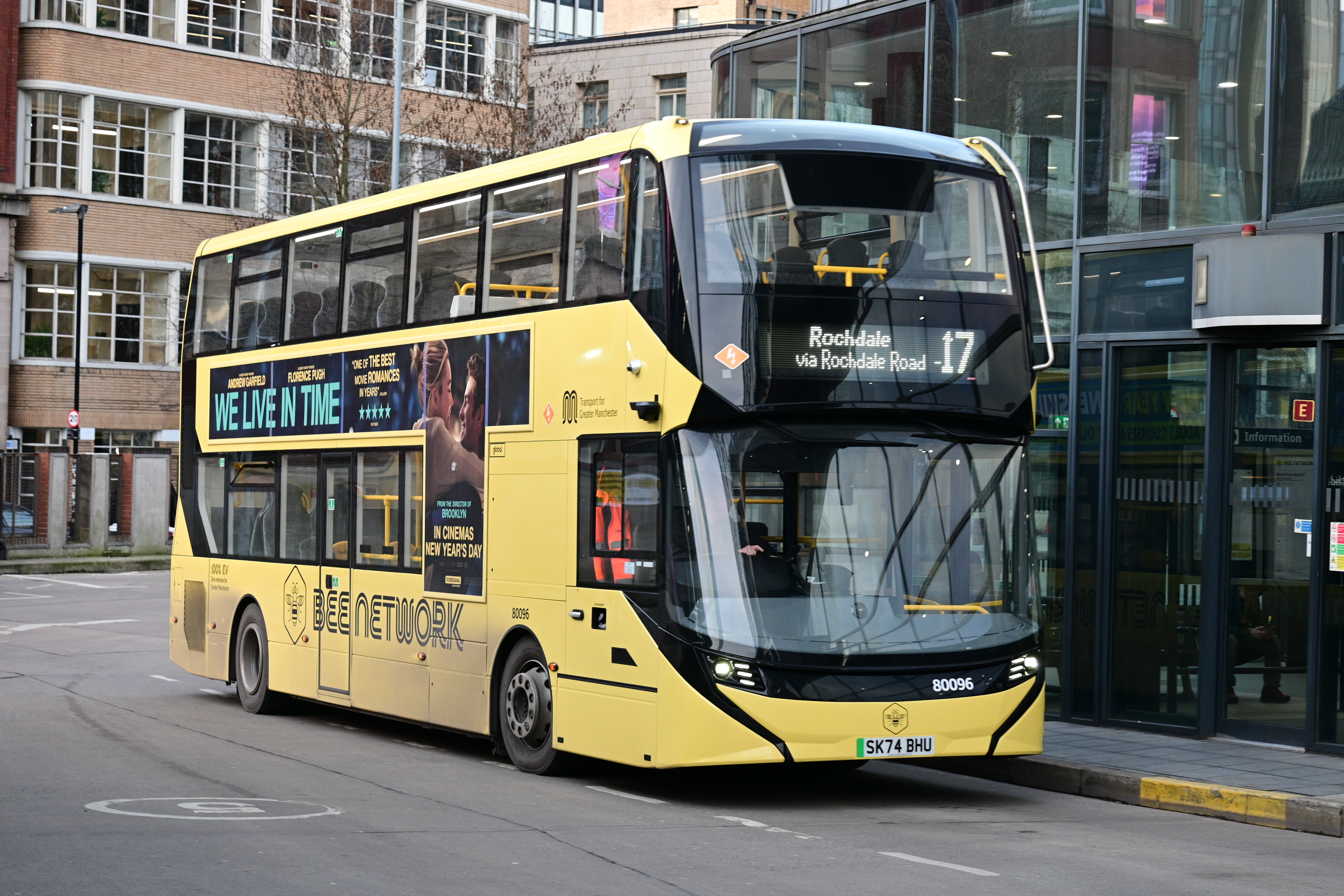
- Stagecoach Manchester Alexander Dennis Enviro400EV at Shudehill Interchange in January 2025

Overview
- Operator: Stagecoach Manchester
- Garage: Middleton; Oldham
- Vehicle: Alexander Dennis Enviro400 MMC; Alexander Dennis Enviro400EV; Wright Eclipse Gemini 2 Volvo B5LH
- Predecessors: First Manchester; Go North West

Route
- Start: Norden
- Via: Rochdale; Sudden; Castleton; Middleton; Blackley; Harpurhey; Collyhurst
- End: Manchester Shudehill Interchange

Service
- Level: Daily, with overnight operation on Thursday to Saturday nights
- Frequency: 10-45 mins (daytime); 60 mins (Midnight operation, Thursdays to Saturdays only)

Greater Manchester Bus route 17 is a Bee Network bus route operates between Norden and Manchester Shudehill Interchange. From Norden it travels through Rochdale Interchange, Sudden and Castleton to Middleton bus station, and then continues through Blackley, Harpurhey and Collyhurst to Manchester Shudehill Interchange. It has a sister service 18 which operates on the same route between Manchester and Middleton, but terminates at Langley instead of Rochdale Interchange.

== History ==
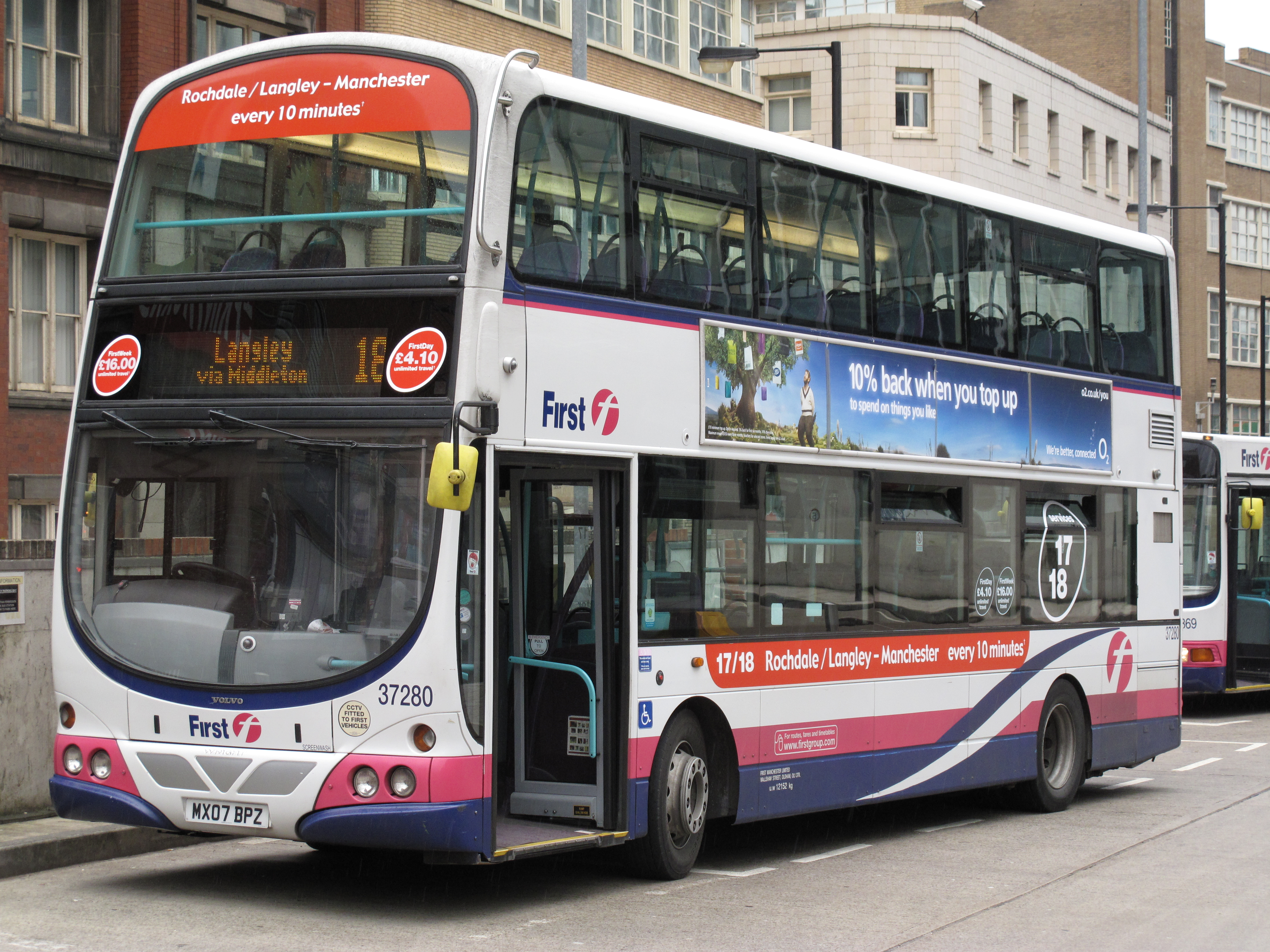
First Greater Manchester Wright Eclipse Gemini bodied Volvo B9TL at Shudehill Interchange in March 2011

The service was originally numbered in 1914 when the Manchester Corporation Tramways route from Manchester High Street to Middleton was numbered 17. In 1925, the Middleton tram route was joined to the routes of the former Middleton Electric Traction Company and on 9 August 1925 Manchester corporation trams began to run through to Rochdale displaying the number 17. At 10 miles 1449 yards, this became the longest tram route run by Manchester Corporation Tramways. Rochdale Corporation took part in this joint service although their trams did not display route numbers and showed only a final destination.

On 13 November 1932 both Manchester Corporation and Rochdale Corporation buses were substituted for trams on this route, the number 17 was now displayed on the vehicles of both corporations but the Manchester terminus was changed to Cannon Street. The service continued to be run as a joint service by Manchester City Transport and Rochdale Corporation Transport until 1969 when control was transferred to the new SELNEC Passenger Transport Executive.

In the 1980/90s it was run by GM Buses before First Greater Manchester took over the company. Meanwhile, a new route for Langley, 18, was introduced, sharing same intermediate stops after Middleton bus station.

Route 17 is one of the few Manchester routes still using its original number from the original 1914 numbering system of Manchester Corporation Tramways. On 2 June 2019, route 17 was taken over by Go North West, with Stagecoach Manchester taking over on 24 March 2024 as part of Tranche 2 of the Bee Network bus franchising rollout.

== Historical short workings and variations ==
As a major trunk route in both the Manchester and Rochdale areas, there were many short workings associated with this route from 1932 until the demise of SELNEC.

From Rochdale:

17T Rochdale to Castleton (Chesham Avenue) outward via Tweedale Street (Rochdale Corporation)

17A Rochdale to Castleton (Albion Street) (Rochdale Corporation)

One journey each day numbered 17A travels via Stakehill Industrial Estate. The timetable is here.

From Manchester:

17A Manchester High Street to Middleton (Manchester Corporation Tramways - 9 August 1925 – 24 March 1935)

17X - used for variations of the route after 1932 with buses travelling under this number to Victoria Avenue East; Alkrington (Mainway); Middleton (Central Gardens) (Manchester Corporation).

An express or "Limited Stop" service, number 8 run as a joint service by both Manchester and Rochdale corporations, used to duplicate this route at peak hours. In the mornings, this service ran only to Manchester from Rochdale. In the evenings, it ran only from Manchester to Rochdale. No stops were observed between Middleton and Manchester in either direction of travel. In the late 1970s it was re-numbered 16 and the number of stops was increased. It was withdrawn in the 1980s.

== Current services ==
=== Full service ===
Full Service only operates at 05:56, 06:16 and 06:35 from Norden and 17:00, 17:30, 17:50 and 18:10 from Shudehill Interchange on working days.

=== Part services ===
Outside the full service operation hours, there are part services providing between Rochdale Interchange and Shudehill Interchange at most times of the day. Additional services were also provided between Queens Park and Rochdale Interchange at 06:23, 06:46 and 07:13 on working days.

There are also part services operating every midnight and dawn:

- Between Rochdale Interchange and Middleton Bus Station.
- Between Middleton Bus Station and Shudehill Interchange.

== Current route ==
- Norden
- Rochdale
- Rochdale Interchange
- Broadfield Park
- Mandale Park
- Highfield Hospital
- Sudden Tesco
- Castleton
- Castleton railway station
- Trub
- Slattocks
- Norton Grange Hotel
- All-In-One Garden Centre
- Stake Hill
- Hopwood Hall
- Cardinal Langley High School
- Stanycliffe
- Hollin
- Middleton
- Middleton bus station
- Alkrington
- Boggart Hole Clough
- Blackley
- Harpurhey
- Queen's Park
- Sandhills
- Manchester
- Shudehill Interchange

== See also ==
- Free buses in Greater Manchester
