= Witch Way =

Witch Way may refer to:

- "Witch Way Now?", episode of American TV series Charmed
- The Witch Way, long-standing bus route in England
