= X41 =

X41 may refer to:

== Consumer electronics ==
- Ear Force X41, a headset
- NetVista X41, a personal computer
- ThinkPad X41, a notebook computer

== Other uses ==
- X-41 (yacht)
- Mission X-41, an episode of television series Joe 90
- Red Express X41 line, a bus route in the United Kingdom
- X-41 Common Aero Vehicle, an American spaceplane
