= X43 =

X43 or X-43 may refer to:

- Lancashire bus route X43, or The Witch Way, long-standing bus route in England
- NASA X-43, unmanned experimental hypersonic aircraft
