= Manchester Chorlton Street coach station =

Coach station

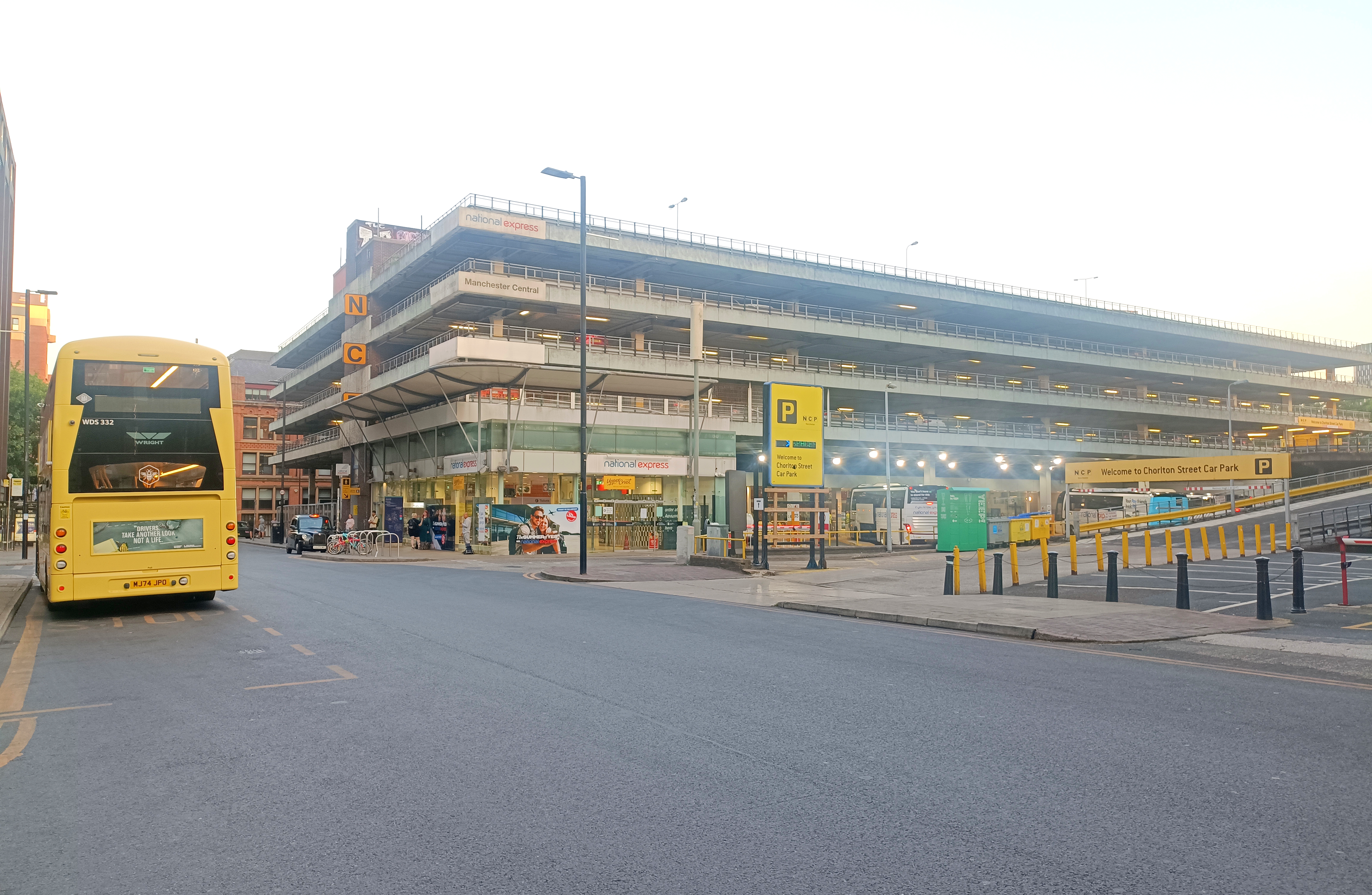
- Manchester Chorlton Street coach station, in 2026

General information
- Location: Chorlton Street, Manchester, M1 3JF; Manchester
- Coordinates: 53.478032°N 2.237220°W
- Operator: National Express
- Bus stands: 8
- Bus operators: National Express, Eurolines
- Connections: Manchester Piccadilly station (480 metres)

History
- Opened: 1950 (original); 2002 (current)
Location

Manchester Chorlton Street coach station or Manchester Central coach station is an InterCity bus and coach station in Manchester, England. The station is operated by National Express Coaches, who provide the majority of services.

== History ==
The station was first opened in 1950 and consisted of three platform islands with long shelters. The station was re-designed in 1963 by Leach Rhodes Walker with the addition of a multi-storey car park and was reopened in 1967. Similar to the original station, it had three platform islands and had a semi-open concourse.

The station had a reputation for being a miserable station, with the semi-open concourse making conditions feel cold and windy.

The station underwent a major re-build and was reopened in 2002.

== Services ==
The station is staffed by National Express who operate the majority of services from the station. Eurolines also operates coach services to the Republic of Ireland and Northern Ireland.

Prior to 2018, High Peak operated the Transpeak service to Buxton, Matlock and Derby, a service previously operated by Trentbarton with a fleet of coaches, but was operated with standard buses by High Peak. From 22 July 2018, this service was curtailed at Buxton, and no longer served Manchester or Stockport.

National Express's rival company, Megabus used to operate services from outside the coach station on Chorlton Street but moved across the city to Shudehill Interchange in April 2009.

Stagecoach Manchester operates 2 Free Bus routes around the city centre, calling at the coach station before terminating at Manchester Piccadilly, as well as route 197 between the coach station and Stockport Interchange. Those routes were operated under Bee Network from outside the coach station.

A number of local bus services stop around the corner on Portland Street. Longer distance limited stop services Burnley Bus Company's Witchway X43 and Blackburn Bus Company's Red Express X41 used to depart from stops outside the station. The majority of these services, save for a few Monday to Friday peak hour arrivals / departures moved to Shudehill Interchange in September 2024.

== Connecting services ==
Piccadilly Gardens is a three-minute walk away from the coach station, from where many bus services run to destinations across Greater Manchester, along with Metrolink tram services. Piccadilly railway station is a five-minute walk away, from where the majority of regional (Northern and East Midlands Railway) and national (Avanti West Coast, CrossCountry, TransPennine Express and Transport for Wales Rail) services depart.
