= Manchester Piccadilly Gardens bus station =

Bus station in Manchester city centre, England

Piccadilly Gardens bus station
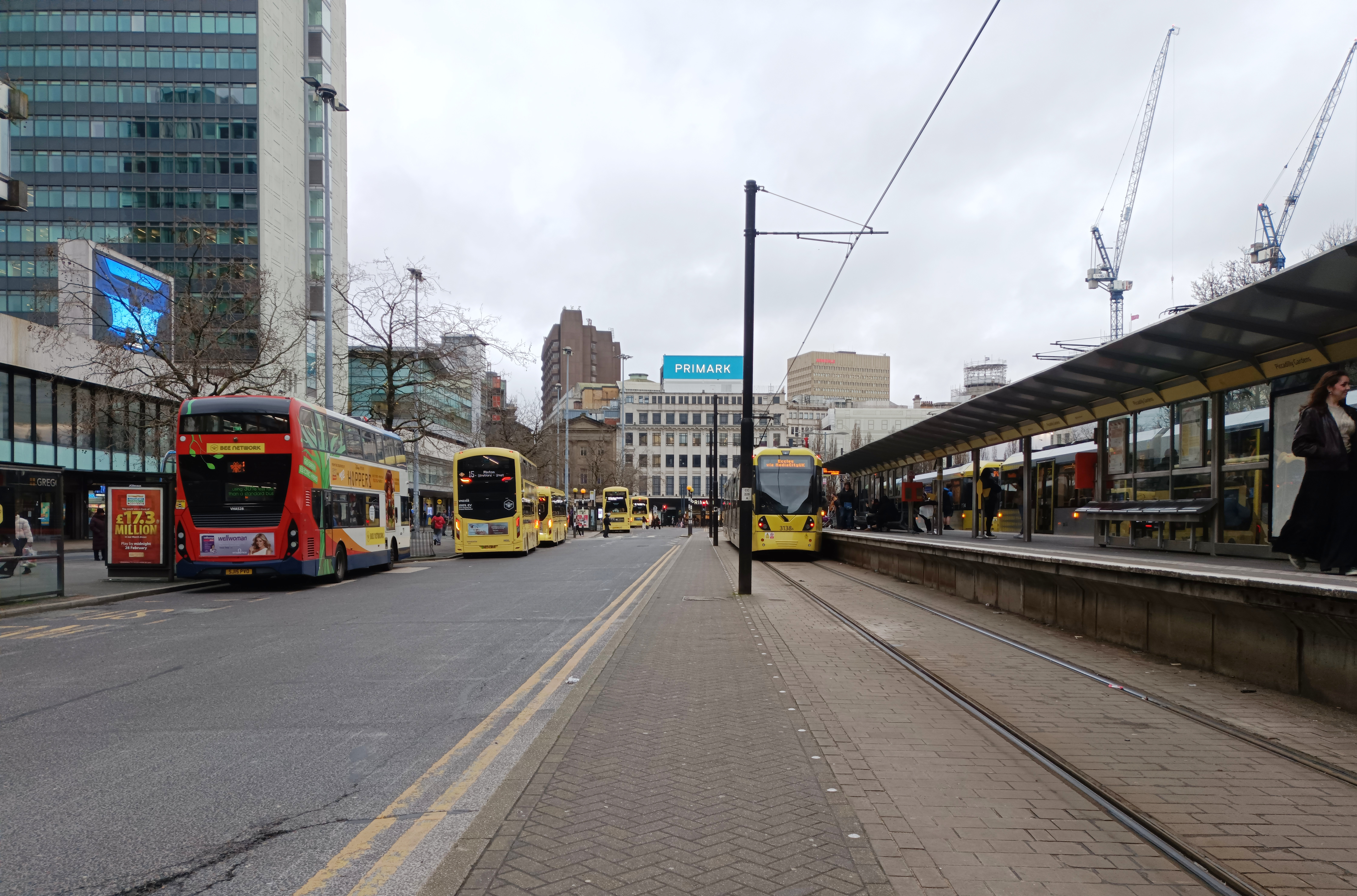
- The Parker Street side of the bus station, as viewed from the tram stop (February 2026)

General information
- Location: Piccadilly Gardens, Manchester, England
- Coordinates: 53.48032°N 2.23751°W
- System: Bus station
- Transit authority: Transport for Greater Manchester
- Bus routes: 71: 1 2 15 18 30 33 33B 35 36 37 37X 38 39 X39 41 42 42A 42B 42C 43 55 59 76 76A 76B 81 83 84 85 85A 86 87 X92 101 102 103 111 112 113 114 117 118 119 135 142 143 147 163 163A 181 182 183 191 192 197 201 202 203 205 216 219 220 221 230 231 250 253 255 256 263 T1 (Note: Routes correct as of July 2026; route numbers in yellow boxes are operated under contract to the Bee Network.)
- Bus stands: 21: A-S (excluding C, I, O); EO-EQ, EW, EX
- Bus operators: Diamond Bus North West; Go North West; Metroline Manchester; Stagecoach Manchester; SightSeeing Manchester
- Connections: Piccadilly railway station (500m away); Chorlton Street coach station (300m); Piccadilly Gardens tram stop (50m)

Construction
- Parking: No
- Accessible: Yes

Other information
- Fare zone: 1
- Website: https://tfgm.com/travel-updates/live-departures/bus/manchester-piccadilly-gardens-bus
Location

Manchester Piccadilly Gardens bus station, often abbreviated to Piccadilly Gardens, is one of two main bus stations serving Manchester city centre, Greater Manchester, England; the other is Shudehill Interchange.

== History ==
The bus station was first opened on the site of the demolished Manchester Infirmary in 1931, to serve as the new terminus of the various extensive regional express bus services run by Manchester and its partners. These services had to be curtailed under the Road Traffic Act 1930 and subsequent regulation of bus services. The station was extended in 1932/33, and again in 1935, to form the full length of Parker Street.

== Layout ==
Piccadilly Gardens tram stop, on the Manchester Metrolink network, is adjacent to the bus station. The majority of the stands are located between Piccadilly Gardens and the Piccadilly Plaza, where buses for south or west Manchester usually begin or end their route. Other stands are located on Oldham Street, Piccadilly and Lever Street for services heading for the north and east of Manchester.

== Services ==
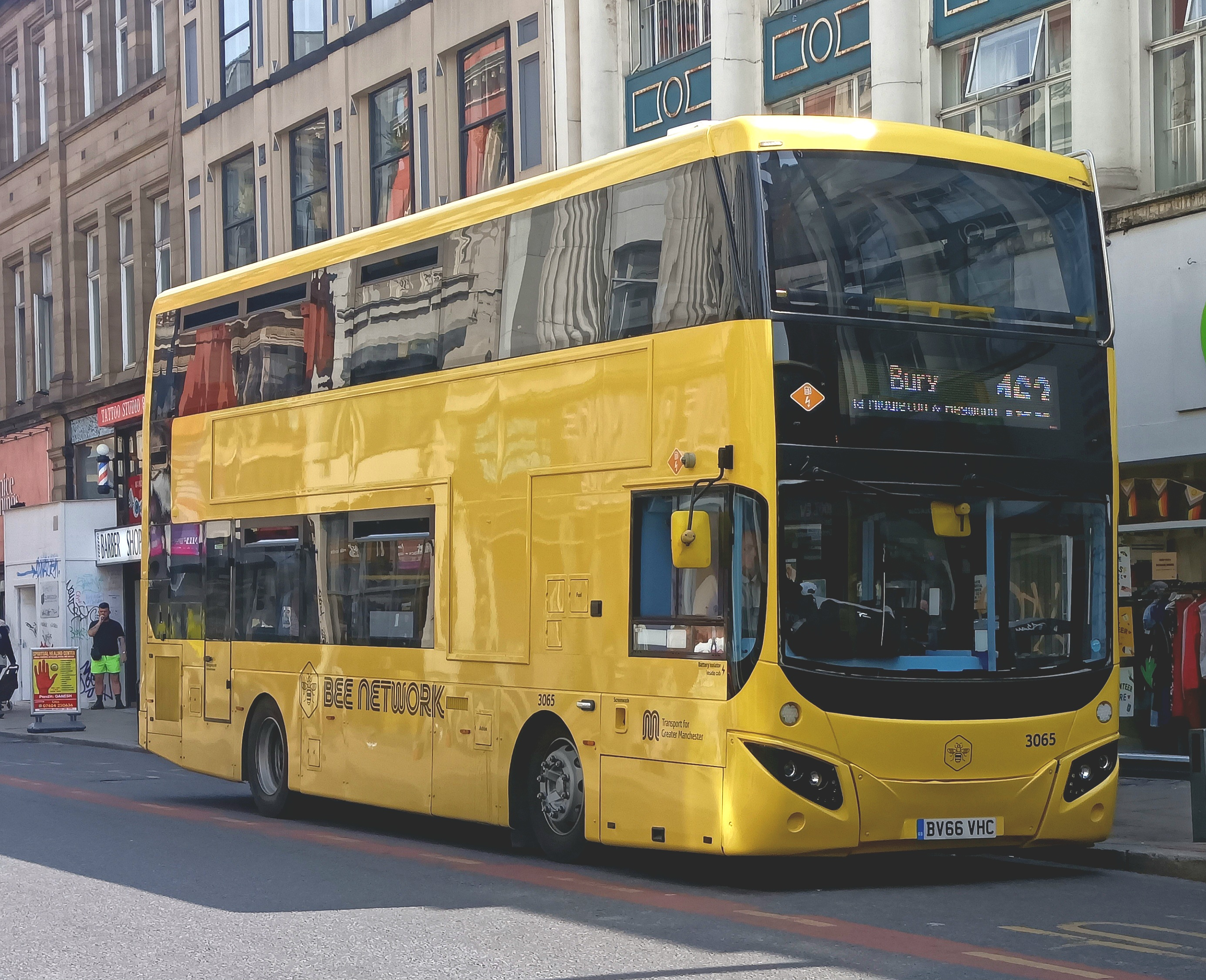
A Bee Network bus operated by Go North West (June 2025)

Numerous operators use Piccadilly Gardens bus station, all but one of which run franchised Bee Network bus services under contract to Transport for Greater Manchester (TfGM). The majority of routes are operated by Metroline Manchester, with the remainder of services run by Go North West, Diamond North West and Stagecoach Manchester; in addition, SightSeeing Manchester operates the T1 tourist service.
