= Rochdale Interchange =

Bus station and tram stop in Greater Manchester, England

Rochdale
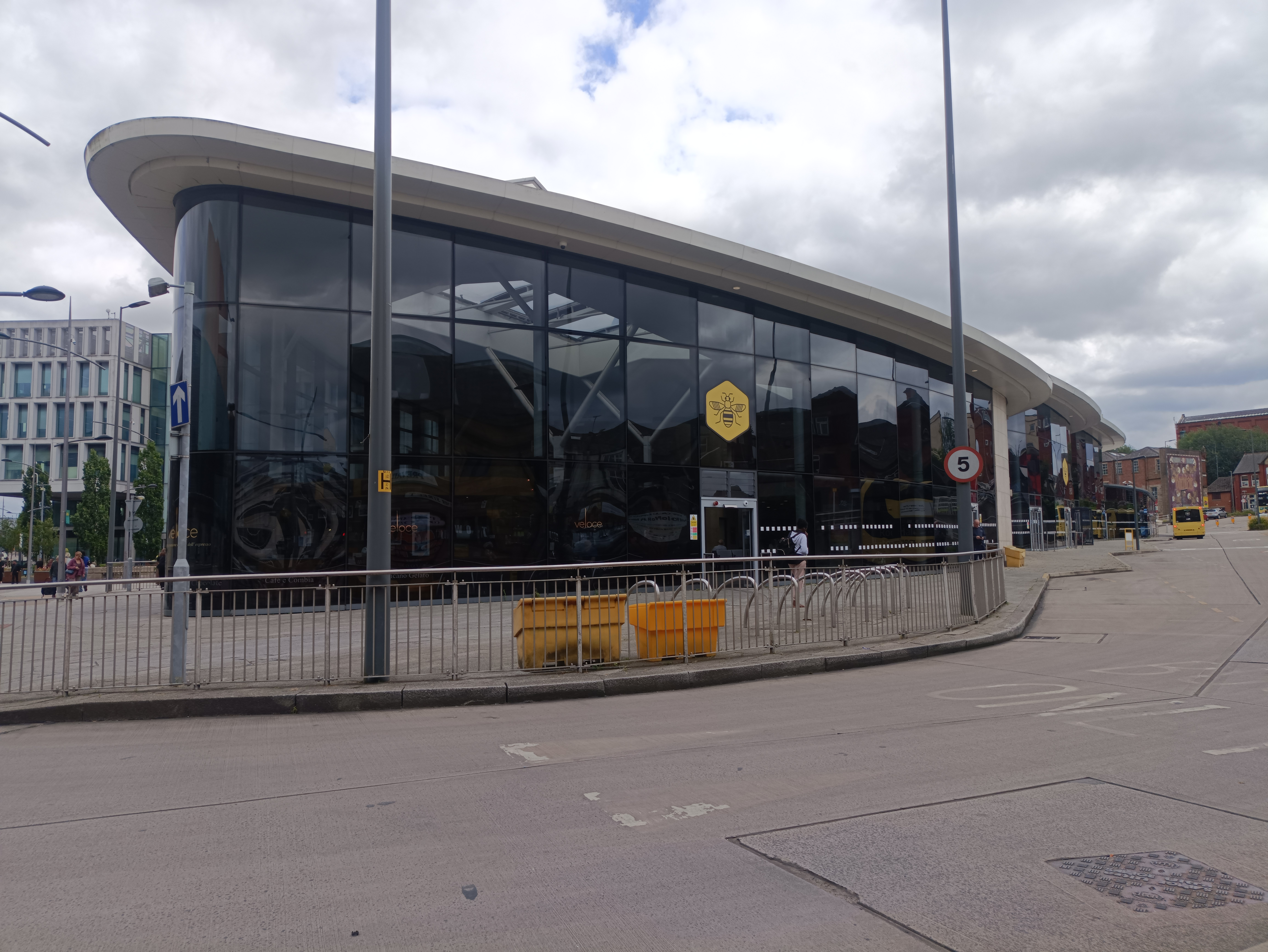

General information
- Location: Smith Street, Rochdale, Metropolitan Borough of Rochdale, England
- Coordinates: 53.6170°N 2.1550°W
- Operator: Transport for Greater Manchester
- Bus routes: 117 17A 406 409 434 435 436 437 440 442 447 450 451 455 456 457 458 461 464 467 468 471 540 587 590
- Bus stands: 13 (Arrivals, A-M excluding I)
- Bus operators: First Greater Manchester; Go North West; Stagecoach Manchester; Blackburn Bus Company; First Halifax; Team Pennine; National Express
- Connections: Rochdale Town Centre

Other information
- Website: https://tfgm.com/public-transport/bus/stations/rochdale-interchange-bus

History
- Opened: November 2013
Location

Rochdale Interchange is a transport hub in the town of Rochdale, in Greater Manchester, England. It is operated by Transport for Greater Manchester. It was opened on November 2013, integrating a new bus station with Manchester Metrolink's Rochdale Town Centre tram stop.

== Services ==
The majority of routes that serve Rochdale are operated by bus companies under franchise to the Bee Network; First Greater Manchester runs most routes.

There are frequent services from the interchange to destinations in Greater Manchester, Lancashire and West Yorkshire; these include Accrington, Ashton-under-Lyne, Bolton, Burnley, Bury, Halifax, Manchester, Oldham, Rawtenstall and Todmorden. Local services to other parts of the Rochdale borough include Castleton, Heywood, Hollingworth Lake, Kirkholt, Littleborough, Middleton, Milnrow, Newhey and Norden.
