= Shudehill Interchange =

Bus station and tram stop in Manchester city centre, England

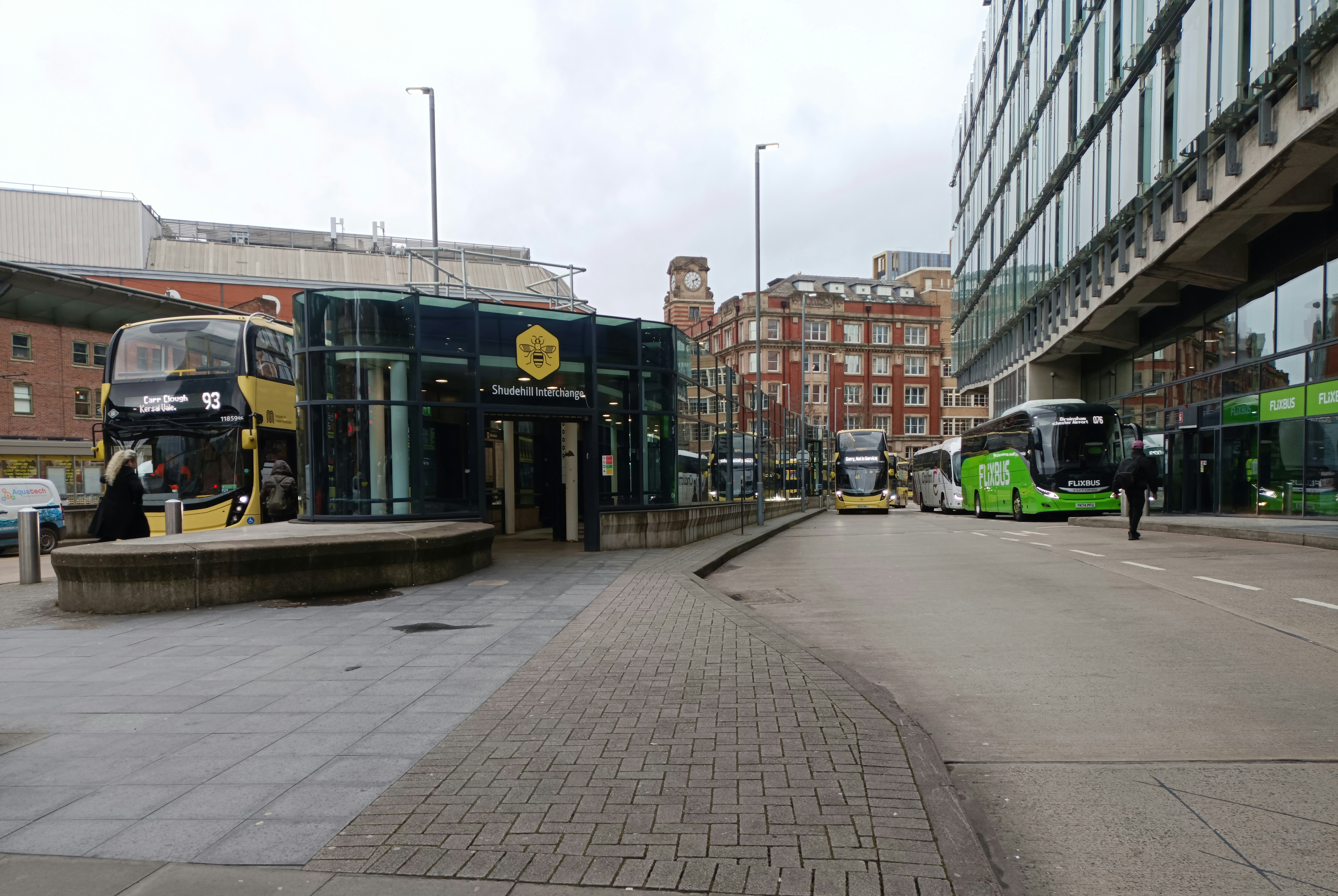
- Shudehill Interchange in 2026

General information
- Location: Manchester city centre, Manchester, England
- Coordinates: 53.48525°N 2.23906°W
- Grid reference: SJ842987
- Manager: Bee Network
- Transit authority: Transport for Greater Manchester
- Bus routes: 2 8 10 17 17B 18 33 33B 56 67 93 97 98 99 100 135 156 X41 X43
- Bus stands: 11 (A-L, except I)
- Bus operators: First Greater Manchester; Go North West; Stagecoach Manchester; Blackburn Bus Company; Burnley Bus Company

Other information
- Status: In operation

History
- Opened: 29 January 2006; 20 years ago
Location

Shudehill
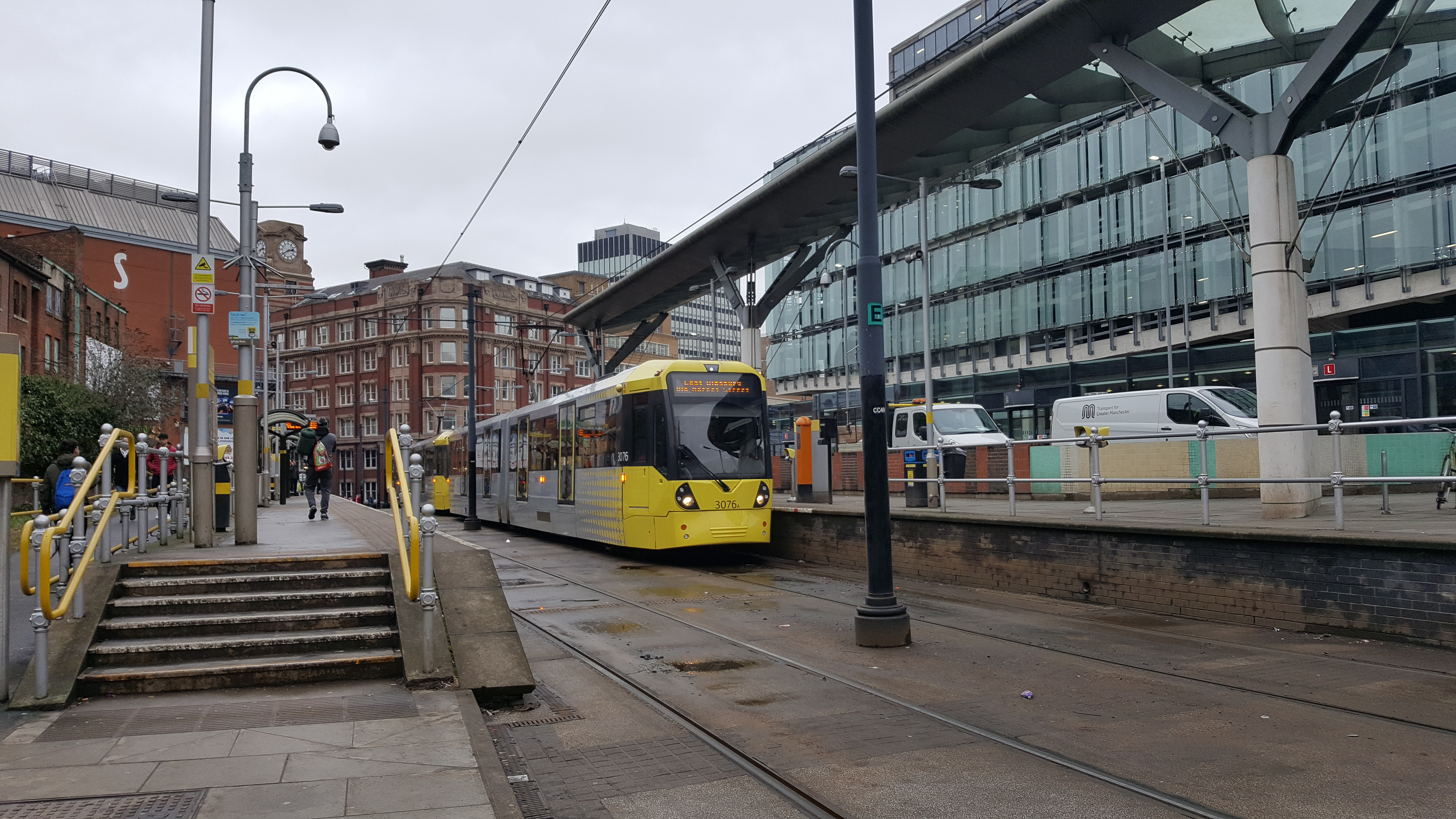
- Tram approaching the tram stop from the north heading to Altrincham, via Market Street.

General information
- Location: Manchester city centre, Manchester, England
- Coordinates: 53.48525°N 2.23906°W
- Grid reference: SJ842987
- System: Manchester Metrolink
- Operator: KeolisAmey
- Transit authority: Transport for Greater Manchester
- Line: First City Crossing
- Platforms: 2
- Tram routes

Construction
- Structure type: At grade
- Accessible: Yes

Other information
- Status: In operation
- Fare zone: 1
- Website: tfgm.com/travel-updates/live-departures/tram/shudehill-tram

History
- Opened: 31 March 2003; 23 years ago
Route map
Location

Shudehill Interchange is a transport hub in Manchester, England. It consists of a Metrolink tram stop, opened in 2003 on the First City Crossing line, and a bus station, opened in 2006 to the east of the tram stop. The interchange lies between Manchester Victoria railway station and the Northern Quarter area of Manchester city centre. The Metrolink stop is adjacent and parallel to the bus station.

== History ==
=== Before development ===
Cannon Street bus station, opened in 1979, underneath the Manchester Arndale shopping centre. It soon became Manchester's busiest; by 1991, it was handling 30,000 passengers and 1,500 bus moves daily.

=== Before Metrolink stop (1992–2003) ===
The First City Crossing opened through the site in 1992, but a stop wasn't built initially at Shudehill. Instead, a stop at High Street was built adjacent to Market Street, serving trams in the southbound direction only towards G-Mex at the time.

Cannon Street bus station's final full day in service was 14 June 1996; the next day, at 11:17 GMT, an IRA bomb damaged multiple buildings in the area, including the Arndale centre. A new bus station at Manchester Shudehill was built to replace it.

Designed by Ian Simpson Architects, construction had initially started on Shudehill bus station in 1998 and it was planned to have been completed and fully operational by 2000. Several disputes over the ownership of the site, along with two public inquiries over the course of five years, resulted in the construction work on the station being halted.

On 10 April 2002, construction of the tram stop began; however, legal difficulties meant that the stop wasn't opened immediately, even after the tram stop construction was completed in November 2002. The bus station's construction was resumed in 2003.

=== After Metrolink stop (2003–2006) ===
The Metrolink stop opened on 31 March 2003 to passengers, and was officially opened on 28 April by Minister of State for Transport, John Spellar. Shudehill has been the least used tram stop in the city centre for most of the years that it has been open. The bus station opened on 29 January 2006.

=== After bus station ===
The tram stop was refurbished in around 2009 for the rebranding of the Metrolink. Also around this time, the old passenger information displays used at the tram stop were removed. They were replaced with new ones in 2013.

== Layout ==
The bus station and tram stop are both at street-level, and connected directly. The entire interchange has step-free access via ramps, however its accessibility has been challenged in the past. There are cycle racks available at the interchange next to the tram stop's inbound platform. Above the bus station is a car park, which has an entrance on Hanover Street.

=== Bus station ===
Shudehill Interchange's bus station has 11 stands, lettered from A to L, leaving out I. (Note: Given its similarly to the number '1'.) There is an entrance and exit for buses on Shudehill, leading to Withy Grove heading west and Rochdale Road heading east.

=== Metrolink tram stop ===
Shudehill tram stop has two platforms, which aren't lettered or numbered. Two double-sided dot matrix passenger information displays stand serving one platform each and show estimated arrival times for forthcoming services.

== Services ==
=== Buses ===
As of 2026, 19 different Bee Network bus routes use Shudehill Interchange, operated under franchise by First Greater Manchester, Go North West and Stagecoach Manchester. In addition, Burnley Bus Company operates the X41 to Burnley and Blackburn Bus Company runs the X43 to Accrington.

Coach services to most large cities in Great Britain are operated by Flixbus, which began inter-city services to and from London in 2020. In April 2009, the Manchester Megabus stop moved from the Chorlton Street coach station to Shudehill Interchange.

=== Metrolink ===
Every route across the Manchester Metrolink network operates to a 12-minute headway (5 trains per hour (tph)) Monday–Saturday, with a 15-minute headway (4 tph) on Sundays and bank holidays. Sections served by a second "peak only" route (like this stop) will have a combined headway of 6 minutes during peak times.

Shudehill is located in Zone 1 and the stop itself has two platforms. Trams towards Piccadilly, Manchester Airport and an extra service running direct to Altrincham Interchange, via Market Street, during peak times all depart from the inbound platform (closest to the bus station). The outbound platform serves trams one stop to Manchester Victoria and more services operate onwards to Bury Interchange, via Victoria every 12 minutes and every 6 minutes at peak times.

Preceding station	Manchester Metrolink	Following station
Market Street towards Piccadilly	Piccadilly–Bury	Victoria towards Bury
Market Street towards Altrincham	Altrincham–Bury (peak only)	Victoria towards Bury
Market Street towards Manchester Airport	Manchester Airport–Victoria	Victoria Terminus

== Incidents ==
- 27 May 2022: A passenger who attempted to board a tram during the closing doors sequence ended up with their hand tangled in a bag strap, which itself was stuck in the door. The driver did not look at the CCTV footage on the platform before departing; the passenger was dragged 13 metres (43 ft) along the outbound platform (Note: In the direction of Victoria and Bury.) before getting their hand unstuck.

== Other transport connections ==
The nearest National Rail station is 300 metres (330 yd) away, at Manchester Victoria.
