= Red Express X41 line =

Bus route in Lancashire and Greater Manchester, England

X41
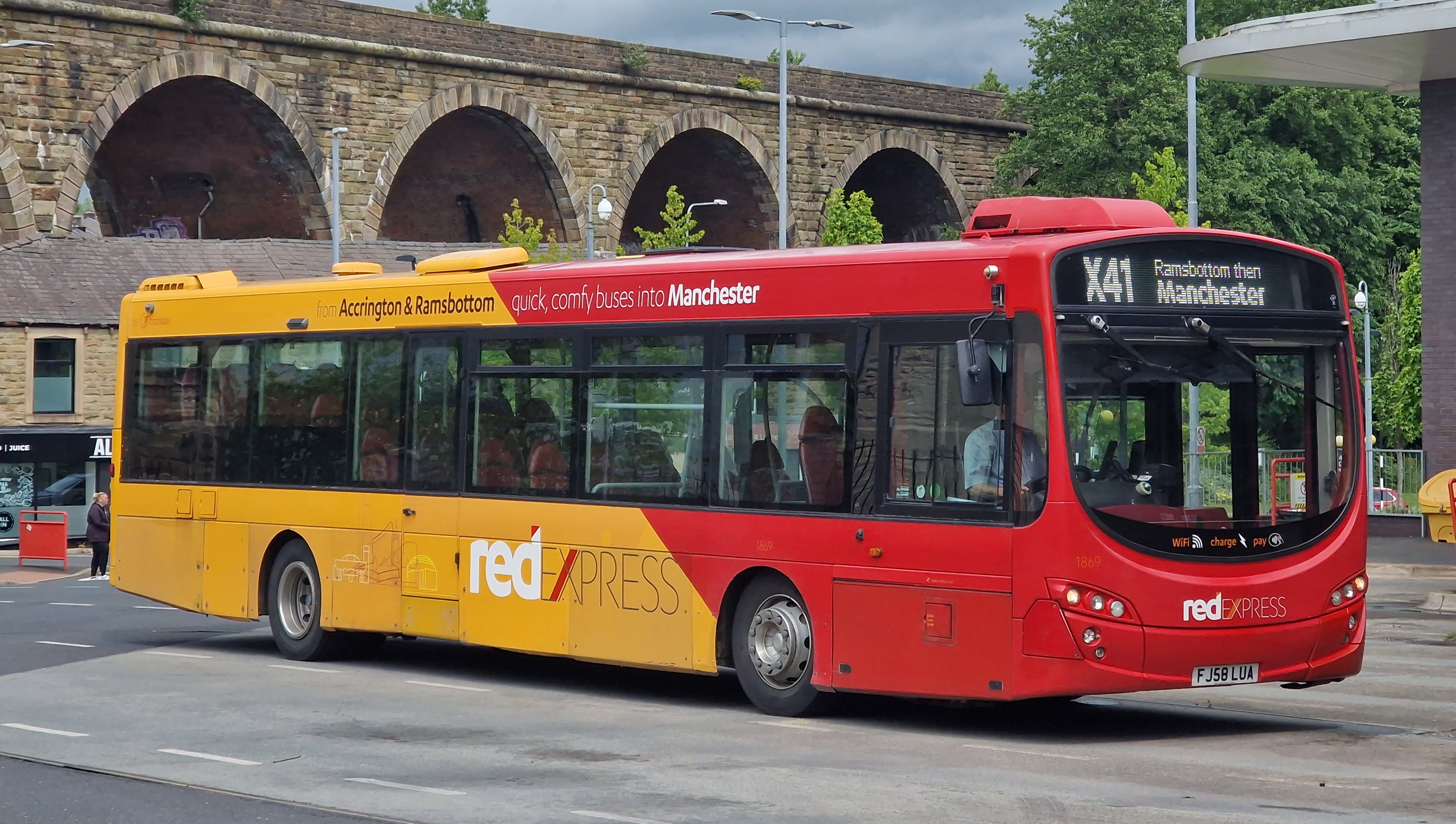
- Blackburn Bus Company Wright Eclipse 2 bodied Volvo B7RLE in Accrington in June 2025

Overview
- Operator: Blackburn Bus Company
- Garage: Intack Bus Depot
- Vehicle: Wright Eclipse 2 /Volvo B7RLE
- Predecessors: The Lancashire Way; GM Buses

Route
- Start: Accrington
- Via: Ramsbottom; M66; Prestwich
- End: Manchester

Service
- Level: Daily
- Frequency: Monday-Sunday Off Peak: Every 60 minutes Weekday Peak Mornings: Every 45 minutes Weekday Peak Evenings: Every 50 minutes

The Red Express X41 is a bus service run by Blackburn Bus Company. It runs between Accrington and Manchester, serving the communities of Haslingden, Ramsbottom, Prestwich and Harpurhey, Collyhurst during peak times. The service travels the M60 and M66 motorways, connecting communities and schools such as The Hollins, Haslingden High School, and East Lancashire Railway in Ramsbottom.

== History ==
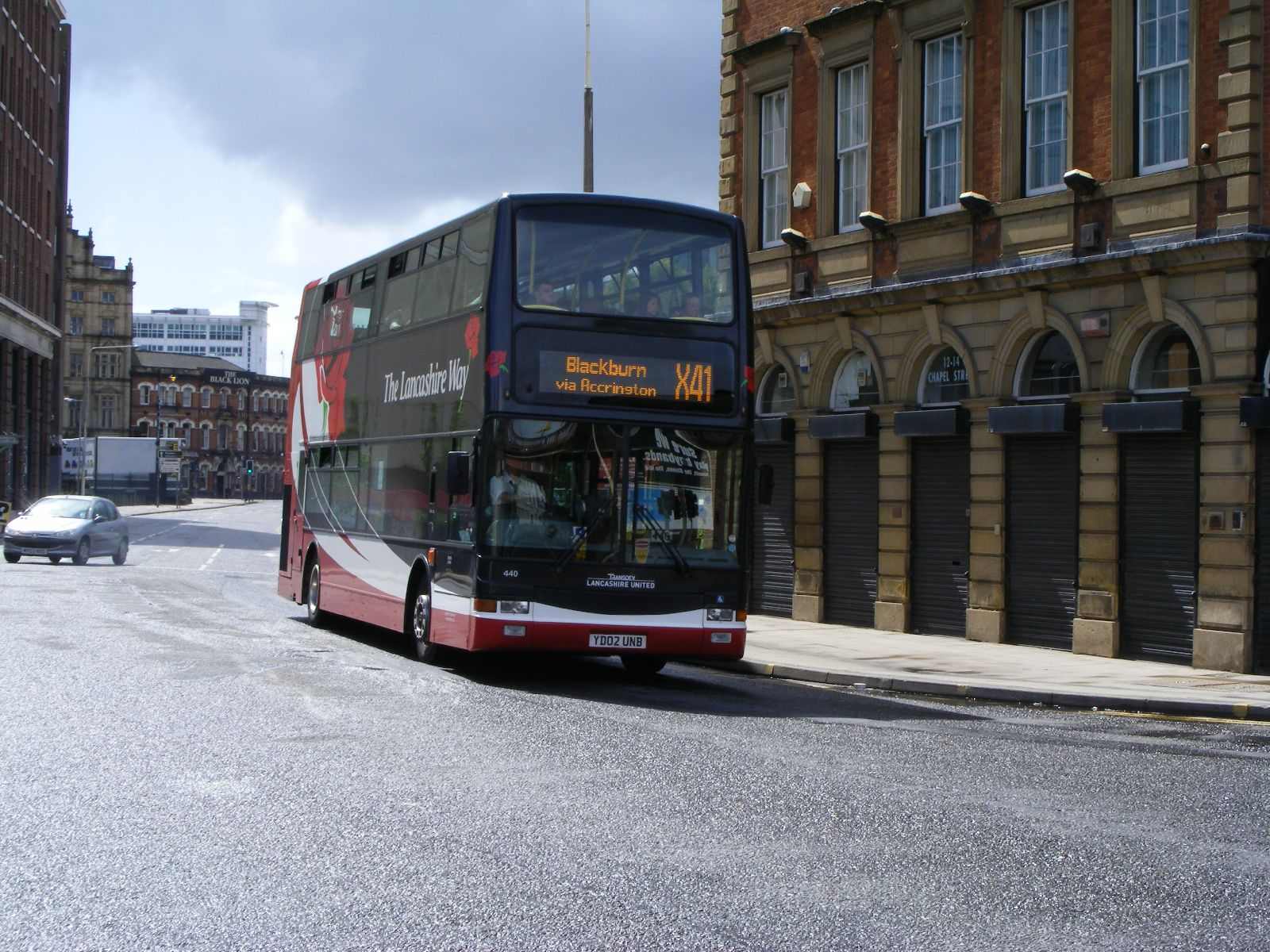
'The Lancashire Way' Plaxton President bodied Volvo B7TL in Salford in May 2009

The service was run under the Lancashire United brand by Transdev Blazefield and was branded The Lancashire Way in black, red, and silver Blazefield livery including The Witch Way and Harrogate & District's 36. The service ran from Blackburn to Manchester via Accrington, Haslingden and Helmshore. An express service bypassed Helmshore via the motorway.

In 2016, following a rebrand across the Transdev Blazefield network, the X41 was renamed 'The Red Express' and gained an upgraded fleet of Wright Eclipse Gemini bodied Volvo B7TLs. These buses received facelifted front ends from later Eclipse Gemini models and were upgraded internally to feature leather seats, free WiFi and USB charging outlets.

In 2018, following customer feedback and a campaign by local MPs, the service was re-routed to serve Ramsbottom while dropping Blackburn. This was believed to be a large factor in the ensuing decline in passenger numbers and the service was almost withdrawn in January 2020 as a result of losses. However a petition was generated to rescue the service, and with meetings between Hyndburn MP Sara Britcliffe, Bury North MP James Daly and directors at Blazefield, a rescue plan was agreed. Shortly after, the double deckers were withdrawn, replaced by single deck Wright Eclipse 2 bodied Volvo B7RLEs.

== Service ==
The bus service runs hourly from Accrington to Manchester via Haslingden, Ramsbottom and Prestwich. A 'FAST' variant operates during peak times, where buses skip Prestwich and instead travel Rochdale Road through Harpurhey, Collyhurst and Shudehill, reducing journey times. The route is operated by a combination of double and single decker buses.
