= The Witch Way =

Lancashire bus route

The Witch Way X43
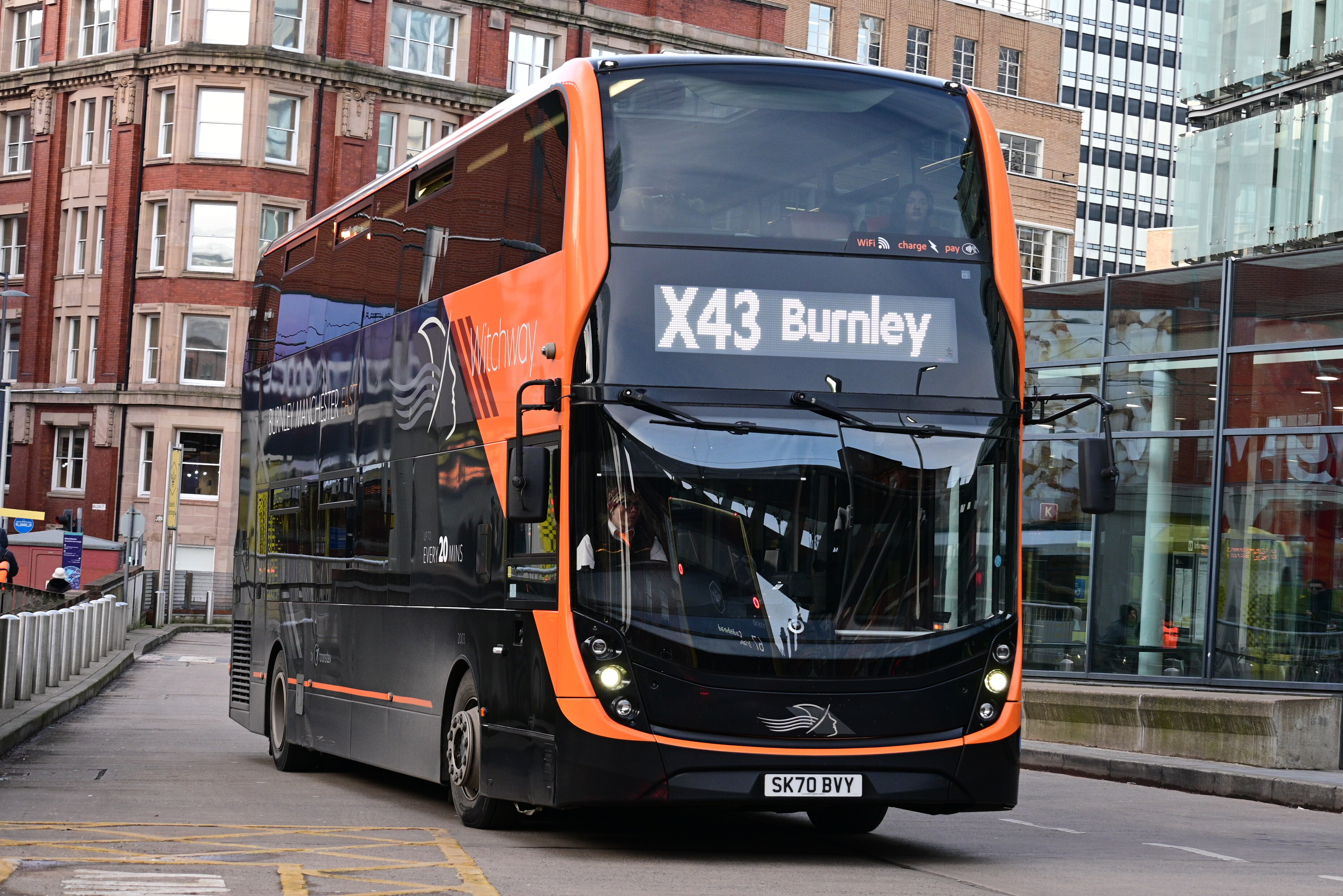
- Alexander Dennis Enviro400 MMC at Shudehill Interchange in January 2025

Overview
- Operator: The Burnley Bus Company
- Garage: Queensgate
- Vehicle: Alexander Dennis Enviro400 MMC
- Peak vehicle requirement: 14
- Predecessors: GM Buses; Ribble Motor Services; Stagecoach Ribble

Route
- Start: Burnley
- Via: Rawtenstall; M66; Prestwich
- End: Manchester

Service
- Level: Daily
- Frequency: Monday–Saturday: 15 minutes; Sunday: 30 minutes; Evening & night: 60 minutes

The Witch Way is the branding for long-standing English bus route X43, which runs between Burnley and Manchester. The service is currently operated by The Burnley Bus Company.

The route has operated continuously since 1948. It was previously operated by Ribble Motor Services, Stagecoach North West and Burnley & Pendle, while GM Buses briefly competed with Stagecoach on the route. During its history it has served several places no longer on the present route, including Bury and the Trafford Centre.

The service was rebranded as The Witch Way in 2005 to coincide with the introduction of new vehicles. It had previously been branded as The X43 and before then was unbranded. Between 1982 and 1986 the route was known as Timesaver, with buses carrying dedicated liveries.

== History ==
Route X43 was introduced between Colne and Manchester by Ribble Motor Services in 1948, replacing another route between Burnley and Manchester. In the early 1950s it was extended to start from Skipton. In 1978, the route was rerouted to use the new M66 motorway, bypassing Bury. Some journeys continued to serve the traditional route, as route number 743.

Ribble Motor Services was privatised in 1986 in a management buyout. In April 1989 it was sold to Stagecoach. In 1992, in response to competition on route 192, GM Buses used its Charterplan coaching subsidiary to compete with route X43 between Manchester and Burnley. The competition ended in 1994 following Stagecoach's withdrawal from route 192. Stagecoach went on to acquire the southern half of GM Buses in February 1996.

For a short time in the late 1990s, the route operated through to Keighley, this ceased in 1999. In 1998 the route was extended south of Manchester to the Trafford Centre. A further change in 2000 saw the northern end of route X43 rerouted to avoid Barnoldswick, prompting some criticism from local residents.

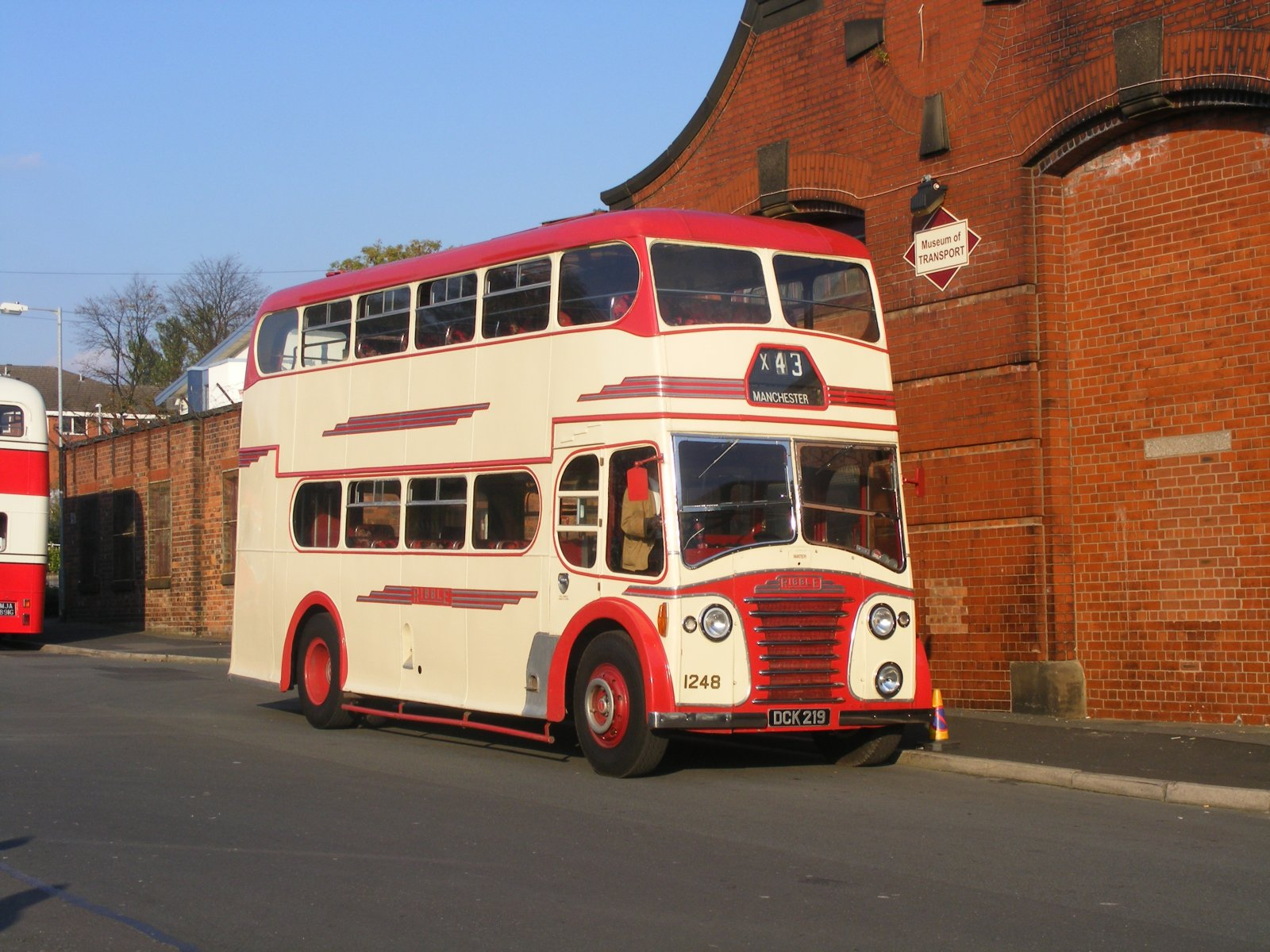
Preserved Ribble Motor Services Leyland Titan as used on route X43 in the 1950s and 1960s

Stagecoach's operations in the Burnley area were sold to the Blazefield Group on 15 April 2001 and rebranded as Burnley & Pendle. In June 2001 one X43 journey in each direction was extended through to Skipton and Hawes on summer Sundays. This proved relatively successful, and the single-deck coach initially used was replaced by a double-decker. It continued to operate into 2003, but was withdrawn at the end of September. Fares on the route increased by 30% in the two years up to August 2004, prompting some passengers to abandon the route in favour of a car-sharing scheme. Despite this, the route saw an average of 12% yearly growth between 2001 and 2004.

In August 2005, the route was upgraded with new vehicles and rebranded as The Witch Way. The service frequency was increased to every 20 minutes, with a Saturday frequency of every 30 minutes and a Sunday frequency of one bus per hour, while the extension to the Trafford Centre was withdrawn. The section of route between Nelson and Colne was also abandoned, prompting criticism from local councillors, although the parallel "Mainline" routes 20-29 were increased in frequency to partially replace these journeys.

Blazefield was sold to Transdev in January 2006. During the first six months after the new vehicles were introduced, passenger numbers on the remaining section of route increased by 24.1%, with total passenger numbers up by 16.1%. The route was shortlisted for a UK Bus Award in October 2006, going on to win the Viacom Outdoor Bus Marketing Campaign of the Year award.

In October 2011, the Witch Way services underwent a revamp with an increase in journeys between Burnley and Manchester, running every 15 minutes Monday–Saturday daytime, but with a reduction between Nelson and Manchester to every 30 minutes Monday-Saturday daytime. Route X44, which differed from the regular route by additionally serving Edenfield, was also withdrawn from service.

On 1 May 2016 the route saw several changes. Faster buses were introduced at peak time between Manchester and Burnley, and the route was extended twice an hour beyond Burnley to Skipton via the M65 and Colne. Nelson, however, is no longer served by off-peak X43 buses, although services remain during peak hours. A Sunday extension of the route to Grassington was introduced; these services had already operated, but had previously used route number 872.

In May 2020, it was announced that the X43 would be curtailed to Burnley. A new service, branded Pendle Wizz, was introduced between Burnley and Skipton, following the same route as the X43. In April 2023, Pendle Wizz was replaced by the introduction of service M6 – an expansion to Burnley's Mainline bus network.

== Route description ==
Route X43 currently runs between Burnley and Manchester, serving the intermediate communities of Rawtenstall and Prestwich. The service makes use of both the M60 and M66 motorways, and connects two notable educational establishments: Alder Grange School and Burnley College. Another point of interest on the route is the Singing Ringing Tree near Burnley.

== Vehicles and marketing ==
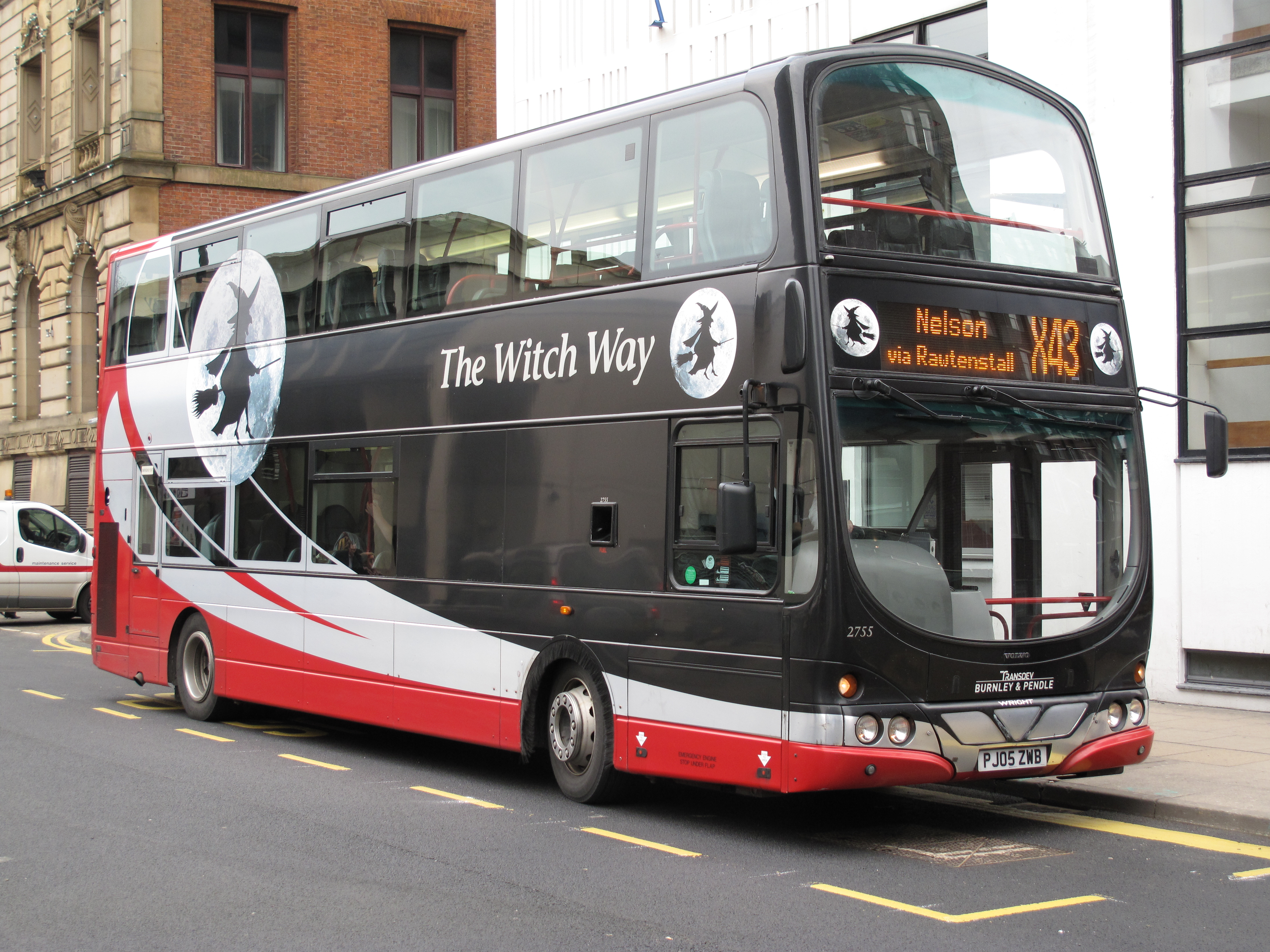
Wright Eclipse Gemini bodied Volvo B7TL outside Manchester Chorlton Street coach station in March 2011

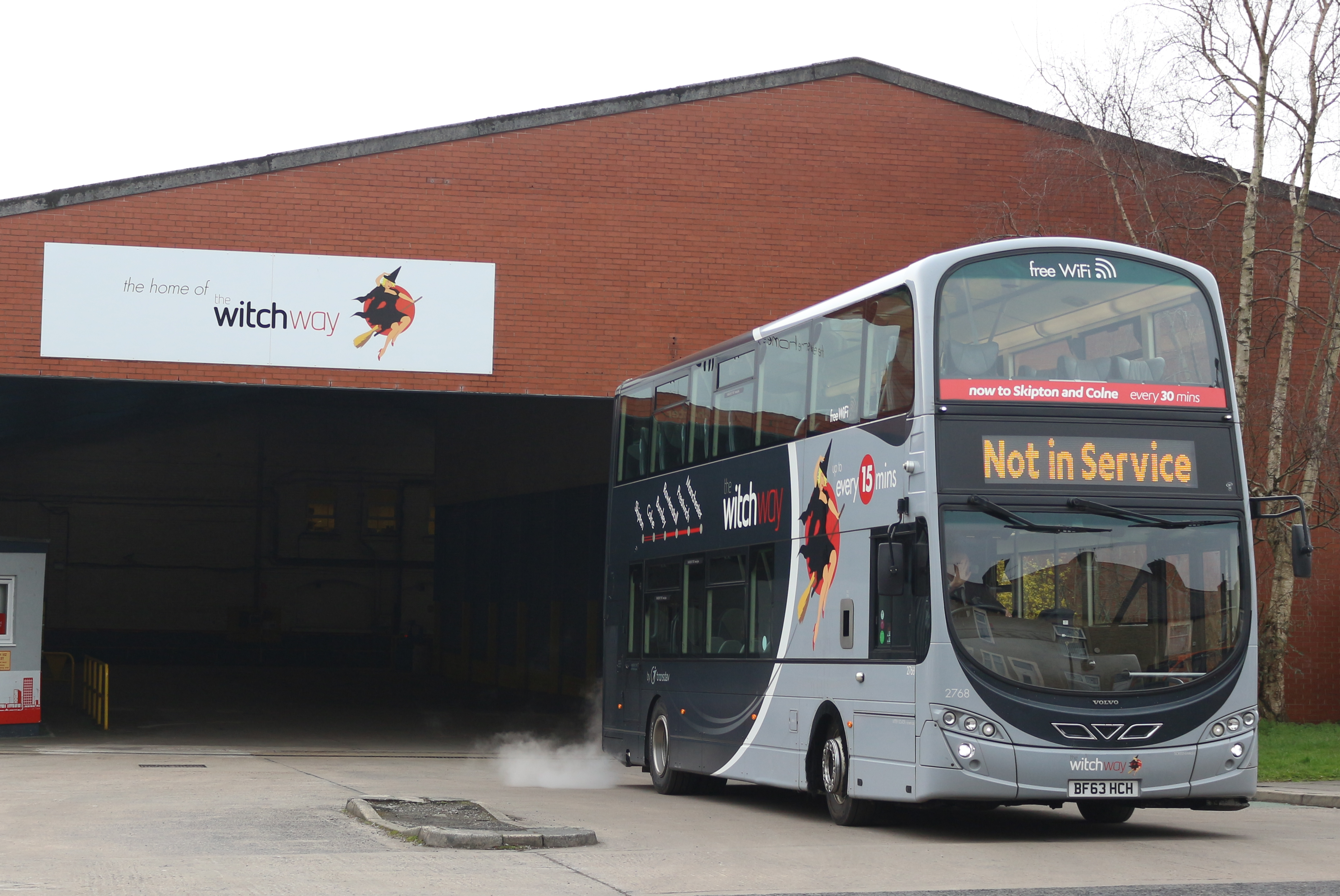
Wright Eclipse Gemini bodied Volvo B9TL leaving Transdev's Queensgate depot in Burnley in April 2018

Route X43 was initially served with a mixture of double-deck Leyland Titans and single-deck Leyland Tigers. In the early 1960s these were replaced by new Leyland Leopards. From 1974 coaches were used on the route, with Leyland Leopards again the preferred choice. In 1982 a small number were branded for the route, using the name Timesaver and the tagline Regular Motorway service.

In 1984 the route was converted to double-deck operation using new Leyland Olympians painted in a unique white and blue livery with Timesaver branding. Four Leyland Tiger coaches in a yellow and red livery also using the Timesaver name, arrived a year later. The route branding was replaced by Stagecoach's corporate image of white with red, orange and blue stripes following their takeover of Ribble Motor Services in 1989.

Stagecoach would rebrand the X43 and introduce a new set of Leyland Olympians in response to the competition from Charterplan in 1992. The route was marketed as The Mancunian, with the Olympians carrying the name alongside Stagecoach corporate livery. New Dennis Javelins were later introduced to replace the Olympians. The route was briefly operated with Volvo B10MA articulated coaches in 1996, but this proved short-lived owing to restrictions on their use in Rawtenstall, with services returning to Javelin operation.

The Javelins were transferred away from the route shortly prior to Stagecoach's sale of the operation to Transdev, and the service was briefly operated with 15-year-old Leyland Olympians. In July 2001, a fleet of 15 new Plaxton President bodied Volvo B7TL low-floor buses, which were specified with features that were unusual to ordinary buses at the time such as wheelchair spaces, high-backed seating and CCTV cameras, were introduced to the route.

In August 2005, the route was again re-launched alongside its new brand identity – "The Witch Way" – with 16 new Wright Eclipse Gemini bodied Volvo B7TLs entering service. These buses carried a red, grey and black livery dedicatedly branded for the route and were installed with high-specification interiors, including coach-style leather seats. They were also each named after the Pendle witches from the 17th century. Coinciding with the high-specification nature, the service was advertised with the slogan "business class as standard".

In November 2013, new vehicles were introduced to the route, in the form of 15 Wright Gemini bodied Volvo B9TLs. These buses carried a new two-tone gunmetal-grey coloured livery, dedicatedly branded for the route. Additionally, the new vehicles debuted the introduction of free WiFi, which allows passengers to connect to the internet during their journey.

On 13 December 2020, a brand new fleet of 14 Alexander Dennis Enviro400 MMC double-deck vehicles were introduced to the route. These buses are fitted to the company's Sky Class specification, and are dedicatedly branded for the route in a two-tone orange and black livery. Features include free WiFi, USB and wireless charging, group seating with tables, individual seating upstairs, an on-board library and audio-visual next stop announcements, voiced by Coronation Street actress Jennie McAlpine, who grew up in Bury.

== Variants ==
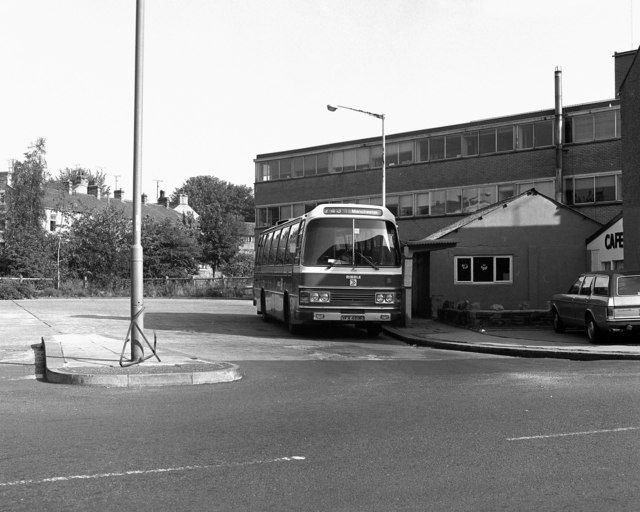
Ribble Motor Services coach on the later withdrawn route 743 in Earby in August 1983

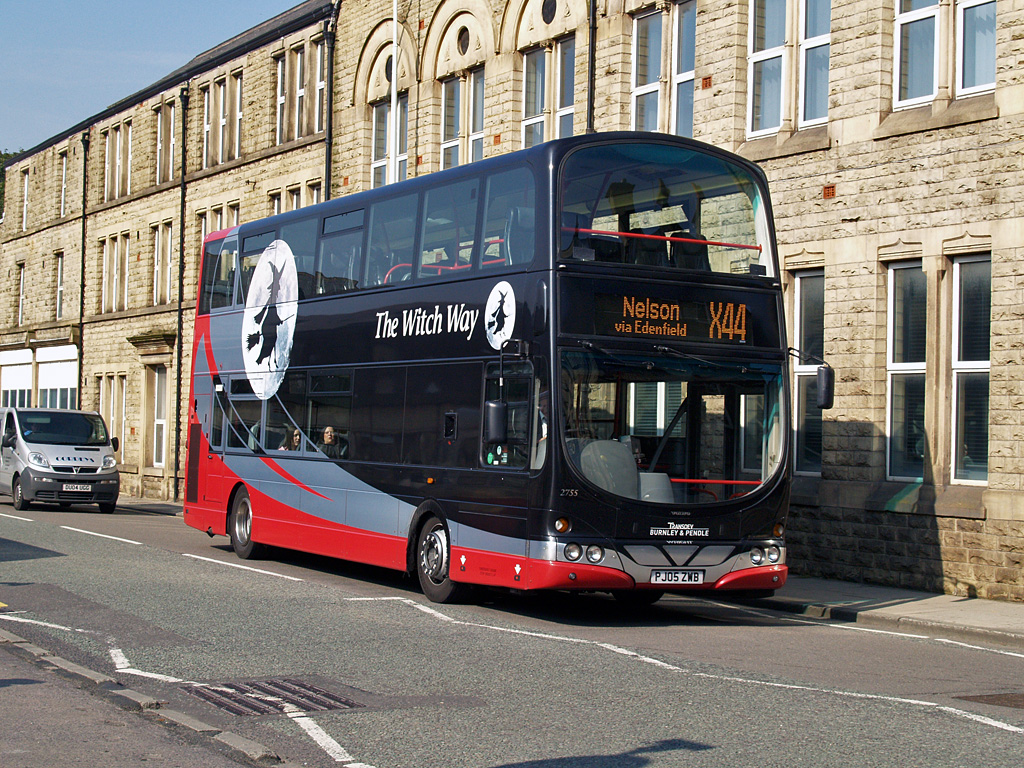
Wright Eclipse Gemini bodied Volvo B7TL on route X44 in Rawtenstall in September 2008 which is now withdrawn.

There have been five alternative routes similar to route X43 operated in the past. When route X43 was diverted away from Bury in 1978, some journeys continued to serve the town. These were numbered 743 and were operated by Ribble Motor Services with a mixture of coaches and buses. Route X43's infrequent extension to Skipton was also transferred onto route 743. The route was withdrawn in 1985 due to a fall in passenger numbers which coincided with the rebranding of the main route as Timesaver.

Route X53 took a different route between Burnley and Rawtenstall, via Water and Waterfoot in the upper Irwell Valley. In the early 1960s these journeys were 4-hourly and started/ended at Burnley. By the 1970s frequency had declined to a southbound morning and northbound evening peak working, but it survived to be renumbered 753 when X43 became 743. It was withdrawn along with the 743.

A variation of the route operating via the Rossendale Valley between Rawtenstall and Burnley was introduced in 2002, taking the number X45. It was operated with route branded Volvo B10M coaches, but was cancelled after a year because of low patronage. In early 2002, route X43 journeys which extended beyond Manchester to the Trafford Centre were renumbered to X42 to distinguish them from the short workings. This pattern continued until the August 2005 rebranding, when the extension was withdrawn. The most recent variation was route X44, which ran until October 2011. It ran via Edenfield between Rawtenstall and the M66 motorway. This allowed commuters and shoppers to travel to/from Manchester with the service running several journeys during the day Mondays to Saturdays. The service was partly replaced by route X8, which ran between Burnley, Rawtenstall and Manchester via Bacup, and First Greater Manchester's route X35, which was extended from Stubbins.

== Accidents ==
In November 1999, a bus travelling on the route from Manchester to Barnoldswick was involved in a crash with a car travelling in the opposite direction in Earby. Four passengers and the car driver suffered minor injuries.

In September 2006, the driver of an X43 on the M60 motorway fell unconscious while the vehicle was moving. Irene King, a 47-year-old passenger, was able to take over control of the bus to prevent a serious accident. She won several awards for this action, including an award for Outstanding Bravery at the 2006 Pride of Britain Awards, a Vodafone Life Savers Award, a Royal Humane Society Testimonial on Vellum, a Chief Constable's Commendation.

In October 2020, a blue SUV pulled out from a side in front of an X43 travelling along the A682 near Clowbridge Reservoir in Dunnockshaw. Three passengers and the driver of the car suffered minor injuries. The driver of the bus was shaken but unhurt. The accident was recorded on the dashcam of a vehicle travelling in the opposite direction to the bus.
