= Go North West =

Bus operator in the North West of England

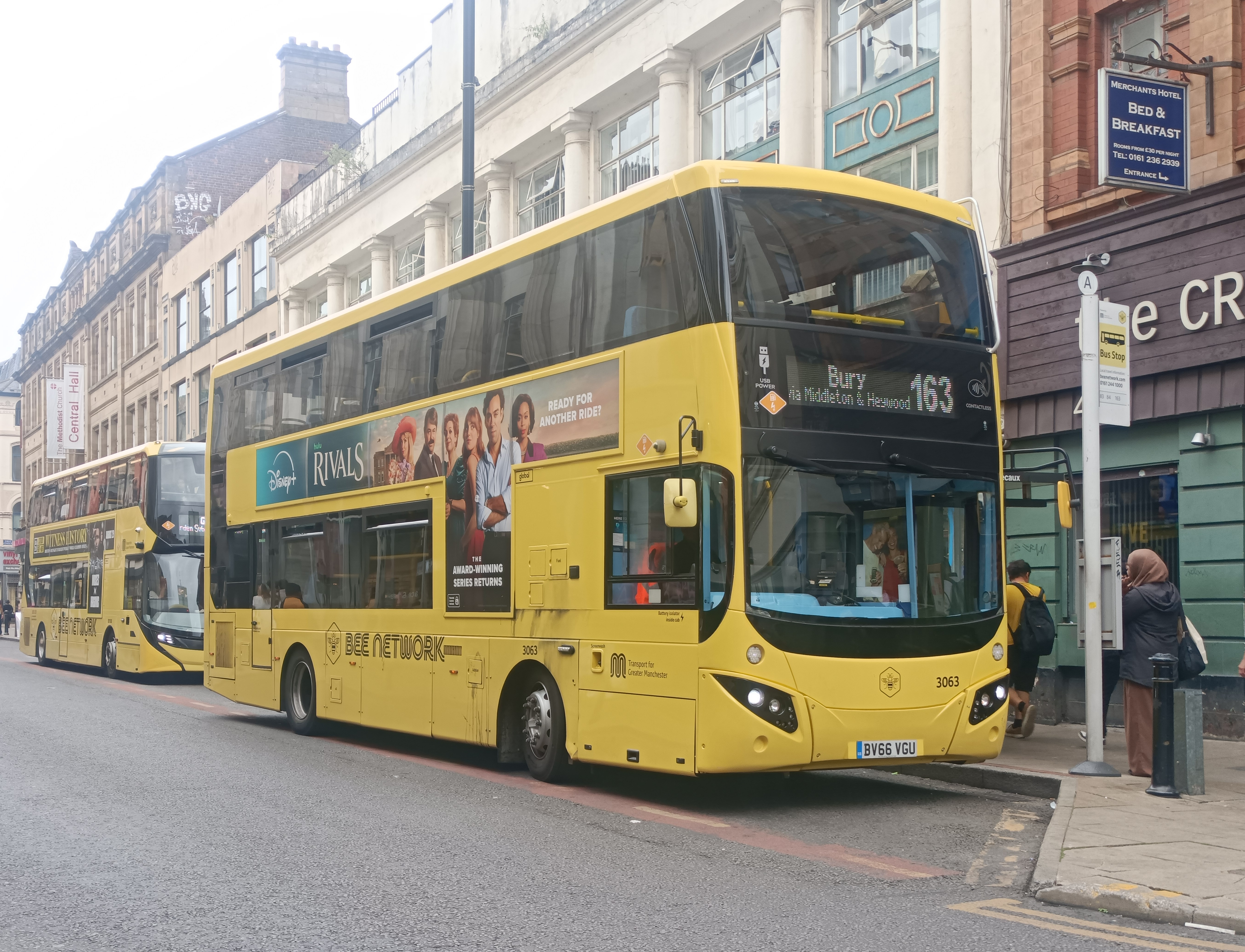
- Bee Network branded MCV EvoSeti bodied Volvo B5LH at Piccadilly Gardens, August 2026
- Parent: Go-Ahead Group
- Commenced operation: 2 June 2019; 7 years ago
- Headquarters: Bolton, Greater Manchester, England
- Service area: Greater Manchester; Merseyside; Cheshire; Derbyshire
- Service type: Franchised bus services
- Depots: 5
- Fleet: 433 (September 2026)
- Website: www.gonorthwest.co.uk

Go North West is a bus operator in the North West of England. It is a subsidiary of the Go-Ahead Group, operating franchised Bee Network bus services on contract to Transport for Greater Manchester and Metro bus services on contract to the Liverpool City Region Combined Authority.

== History ==
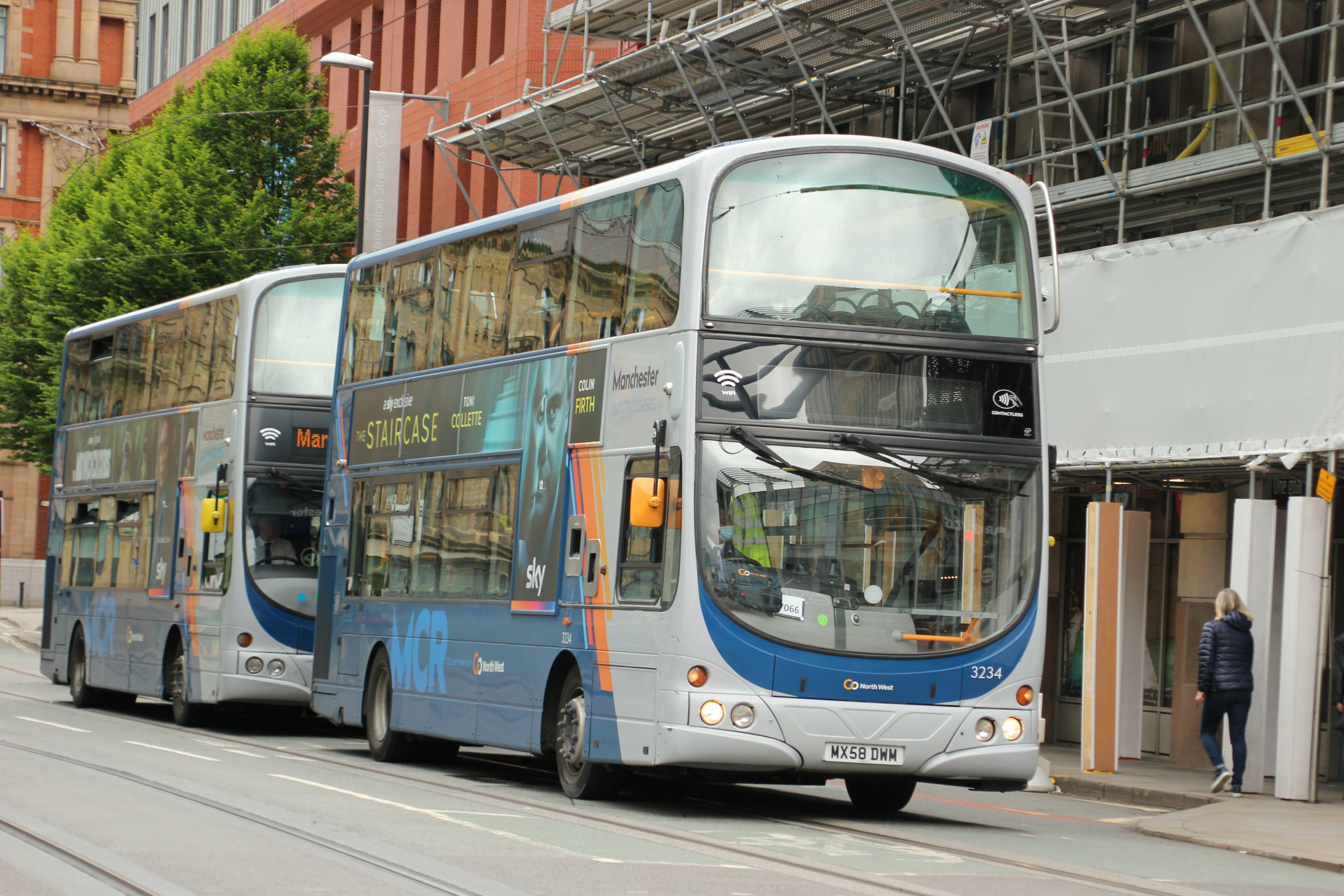
Wright Eclipse Gemini bodied Volvo B9TLs in the second iteration of corporate livery on Corporation Street in July 2022

Go North West commenced operations on 2 June 2019 following the Go-Ahead Group's purchase of First Greater Manchester's Queens Road depot with 163 vehicles.

In December 2022, the Greater Manchester Combined Authority announced that Go North West had won the first round of franchising to run the first Bee Network bus services in the metropolitan boroughs of Bolton and Wigan from September 2023, displacing the operations of Diamond North West and Stagecoach Manchester in both boroughs. Go North West took delivery of 50 Bee Network branded BYD Alexander Dennis Enviro400EV battery electric buses, the first new buses purchased for the franchised network, for use on these services.

Go North West expanded further into the North West of England with the awarding in January 2026 of a tender by the Liverpool City Region Combined Authority to run franchised Metro 'Category 1' bus services in the Metropolitan Borough of Wirral. The contract, which commenced on 25 October 2026, saw Go North West enter Merseyside with a fleet of 117 buses on 45 routes in the Wirral, taking over the operations of Arriva Merseyside and Stagecoach Merseyside and South Lancashire within the borough.

Go North West are to expand further within Greater Manchester from March 2027 with the awarding of five small Bee Network bus contracts in Bolton and Leigh, originally operated by Diamond North West, in the first round of Bee Network contract retendering. The contracts, bringing 60 buses and 38 routes to the operator, will see Go North West open a new depot in Leigh to operate 18 of these routes in the town.

== Services ==
Metro branded Alexander Dennis Enviro200 MMC in Ness on the Wirral Peninsula in October 2026

Go North West's Bee Network operations largely serve suburban areas in Salford, Bury, Bolton, Tameside and Wigan. Metro operations, meanwhile, largely serve the Wirral Peninsula, with some services extending into Liverpool via the Mersey Tunnels.

Prior to the rollout of the Bee Network brand and the routes subsequently changing hands, certain routes in Greater Manchester were given branding by Go North West. The 52 and the 53, the latter being Manchester's oldest unchanged bus route, was branded with an orange livery as the 'Manchester's Orbits', while the 135 route received a similar green livery, both based on the standard fleet livery. In 2021, the CrossCity brand was launched on the 41 service serving Sale and Middleton via the city centre.

== Fleet ==
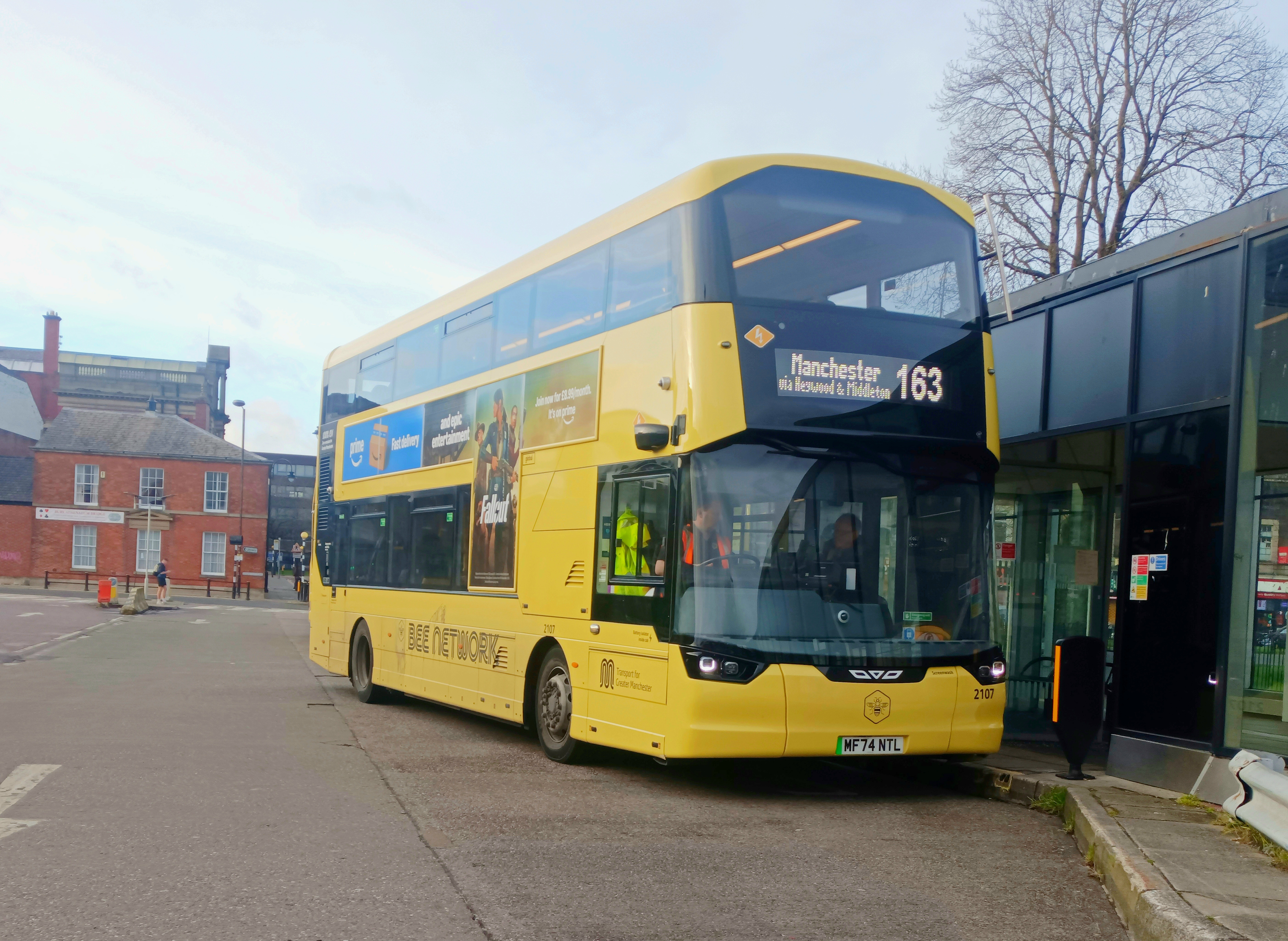
Bee Network branded Wright StreetDeck Electroliner battery electric bus at Bury Interchange in January 2026

As of September 2026, Go North West operates a fleet of 433 buses. Prior to the rollout of Bee Network branding, buses were initially painted into a livery designed by local marketing agency We Are Buzz, however the livery was redesigned in late 2019. This redesign later coincided with the introduction of the Manchester's Orbits and 135 branding, and received minor changes again for the rollout of the CrossCity brand for service 41 between Middleton and Sale.

Go North West operates from 5 depots, with four, these being the former First Greater Manchester and Diamond North West depot at Weston Street, Bolton, the former Stagecoach Manchester depot in Wigan, two smaller depots in Heywood and Denton, used for franchised Bee Network operations. The company additionally took over the operations of Arriva North West's Birkenhead depot for Metro franchise services from 25 October 2026.

From the company's launch in 2019 until March 2024, a majority of Go North West's buses were based at the former First Manchester depot in Queen's Road, Cheetham Hill, opened in 1901 by the Manchester Carriage and Tramways Company as the first electric tram depot to open in Manchester. The depot premises is adjacent to the Museum of Transport in Manchester. Following the acquisition of the garage, Go North West had the depot's original clock restored to working order and also funded an auction bid to help return the golden key used to first open the garage to the adjacent museum. Go North West departed Queen's Road depot on 24 March 2024 following the awarding of the depot to Stagecoach Manchester in Tranche 2 of Bee Network franchising.

== Controversies ==
=== 2021 strike action ===
On 28 February 2021, a strike was called by the union Unite over concerns that the new payment package was a 'fire and re-hire' scheme, following Go North West making a loss of £1.8 million per year. A reduced service operated during the period of industrial action, with the company hiring other local operators to maintain services, some of which were criticised by Unite for overcrowding buses during the third COVID-19 lockdown. The strike ended on 18 May 2021 after successful talks between both parties. Lasting 85 days, Unite claims this to have been their longest period of strike action.

=== Dismissal of Tracey Scholes ===
In December 2021, driver Tracey Scholes was dismissed after 34 years of service due to new side mirrors on the fleet being phased in to replace "branch" mirrors following consultation with the union Unite. An unforeseen consequence of this was that Scholes could not operate the vehicle safely, being too short to use them as the same time as driving the bus.

A Go North West spokesperson said Scholes was a valued member of the team and they had made "numerous proposals to accommodate" Scholes, but the suggestions were rejected.

Scholes had been the first female bus driver for a Manchester depot, starting work at Queens Road in 1984. A rally in support of Scholes was held outside of the Queens Road depot while a petition demanding Go North West reinstate Scholes reached 25,000 signatures, and following a final appeal in January 2022, Scholes' position at Go North West was reinstated.
