= Free buses in Greater Manchester =

Public transport system in Greater Manchester, England

free bus

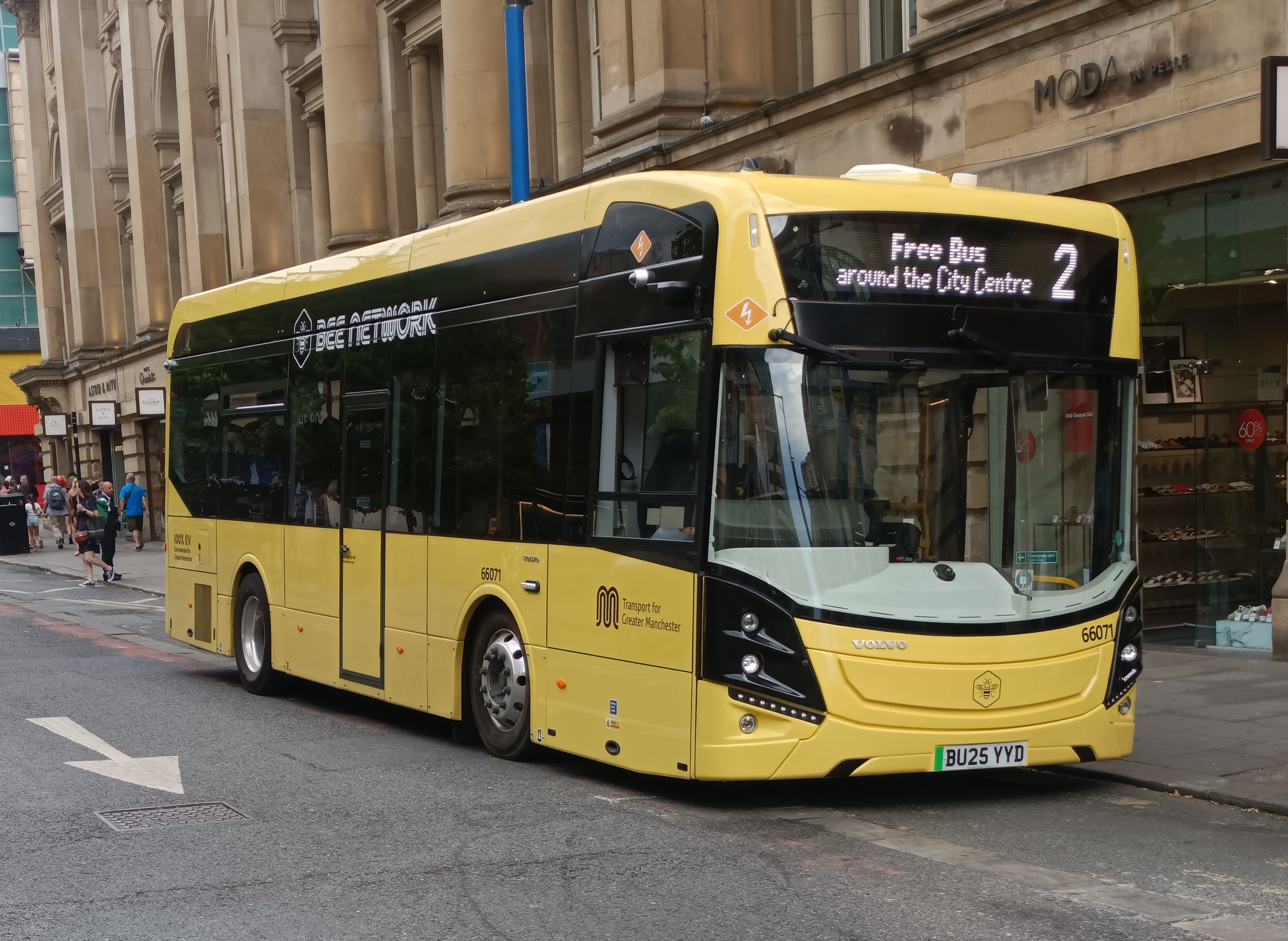
- Stagecoach Manchester Volvo BZL on free bus route 2 at Manchester Arndale in August 2025
- Parent: Transport for Greater Manchester
- Founded: 1 July 1974 (as Centreline); 26 September 2002 (as Metroshuttle); 28 October 2018 (as free bus)
- Locale: Greater Manchester
- Service area: Manchester City Centre; Deansgate; Spinningfield; Manchester Chinatown; Manchester Arndale; Printworks; Shudehill Interchange; Piccadilly Gardens; Northern Quarter; Manchester Piccadilly
- Service type: Zero-Fare bus services
- Fleet: Volvo B5LH Wright Eclipse Gemini 2 Volvo BZL
- Operator: Stagecoach Manchester
- Website: free bus website

Former Metroshuttle brand

Free bus is a zero-fare bus system that operates in Greater Manchester. The system was first introduced in Manchester city centre in 2002, with currently two routes linking the city's major thoroughfares and stations with its main commercial, financial and cultural districts.

== Manchester City Centre ==
=== History ===
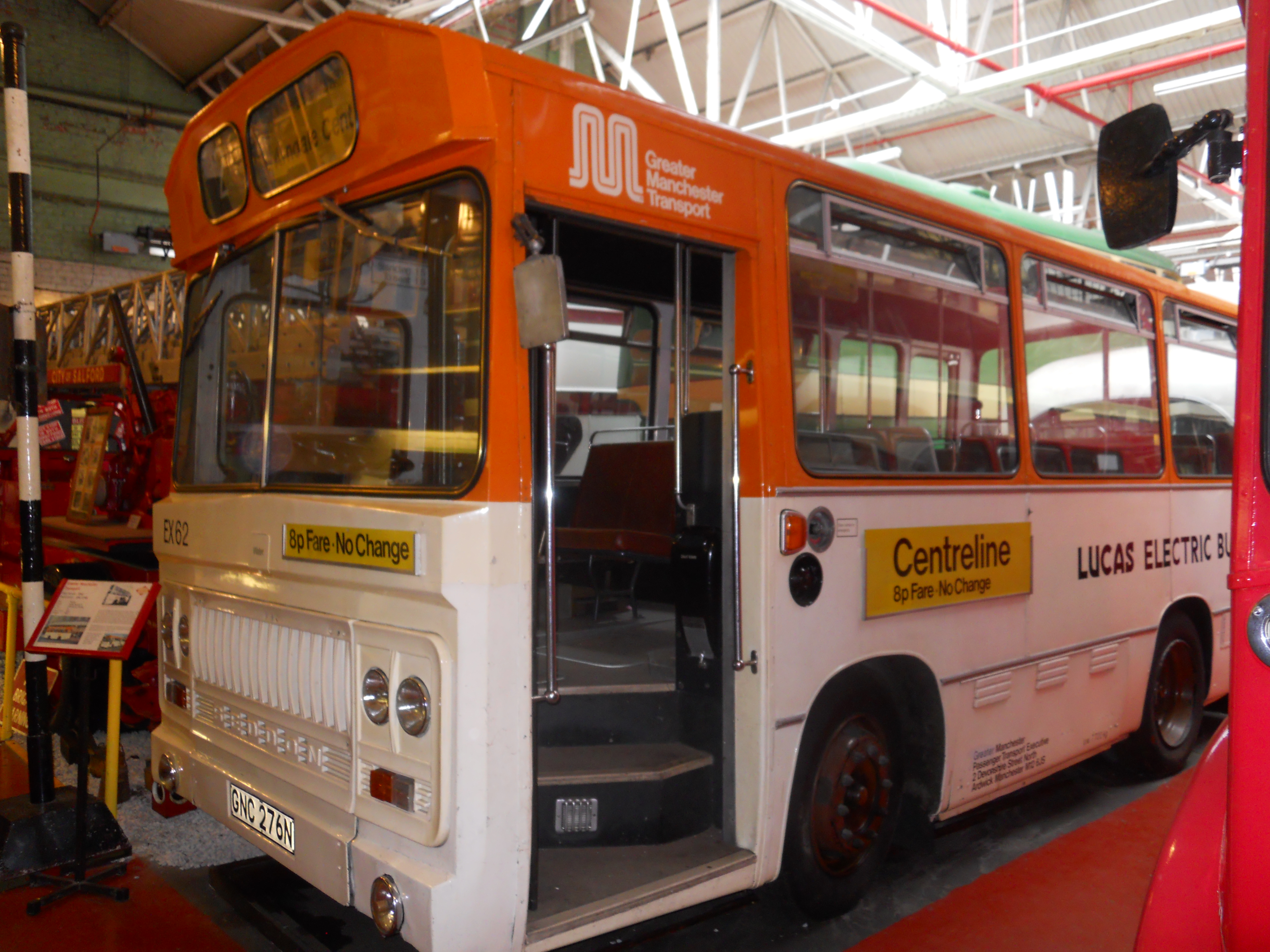
Greater Manchester Transport Centreline bus on display at the Museum of Transport, Greater Manchester

Transport across the Greater Manchester conurbation historically suffered from poor north–south connections due to the fact that Manchester's main railway stations, Piccadilly and Victoria, were built in the 1840s on peripheral locations outside Manchester city centre. In the 1960s and 1970s, the public transport authority SELNEC evaluated a number of proposals to connect Manchester's northern and southern rail terminals, including several types of monorail systems and metro-style systems. A scheme was promoted to build an underground rail link across Manchester city centre, known as the Picc-Vic tunnel, but this failed to attract the necessary government funding and the project was cancelled in 1977.

To address the problem of cross-city transit, the Greater Manchester Passenger Transport Executive (SELNEC's successor) proposed a new circular shuttle bus service between Piccadilly and Victoria stations. The new Centreline bus service was initially opposed by the Taxi Owners' Association, but was approved by the North Western Traffic Commissioner. Centreline was first operated using a fleet of Seddon Pennine IV midibuses, noted for their diminutive appearance. GMPTE also introduced an experimental battery-electric bus onto Centreline, the Lucas Electric Bus, which was based on the Seddon chassis and body. This was Greater Manchester's second electric bus, the first being SELNEC's experimental Silent Rider, but it was eventually taken out of service. Operated under the Greater Manchester Transport brand, Centreline came into operation on 1 July 1974. Passengers were charged a flat fare of 2p for each journey.

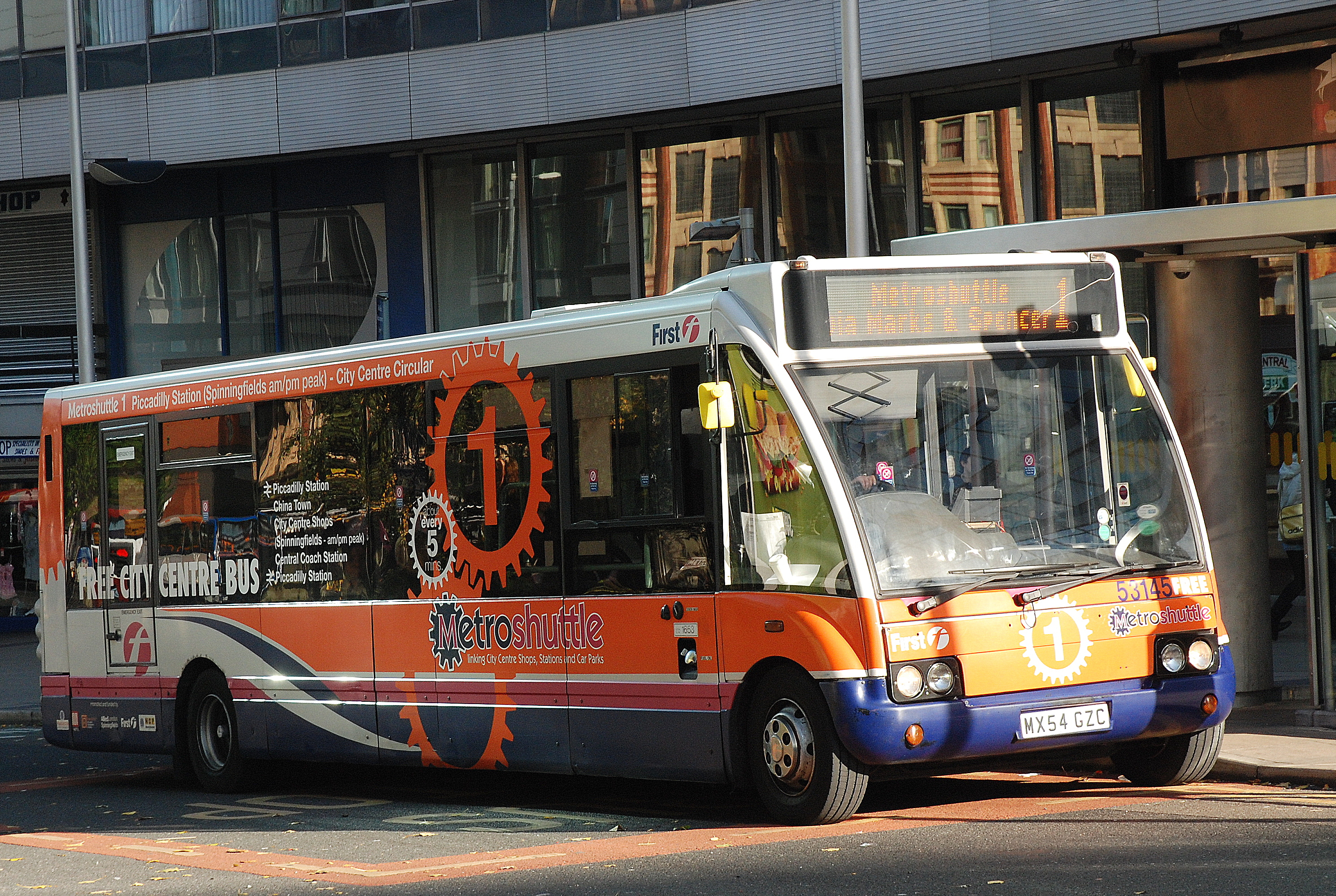
First Manchester Optare Solo on Manchester route 1 in October 2009

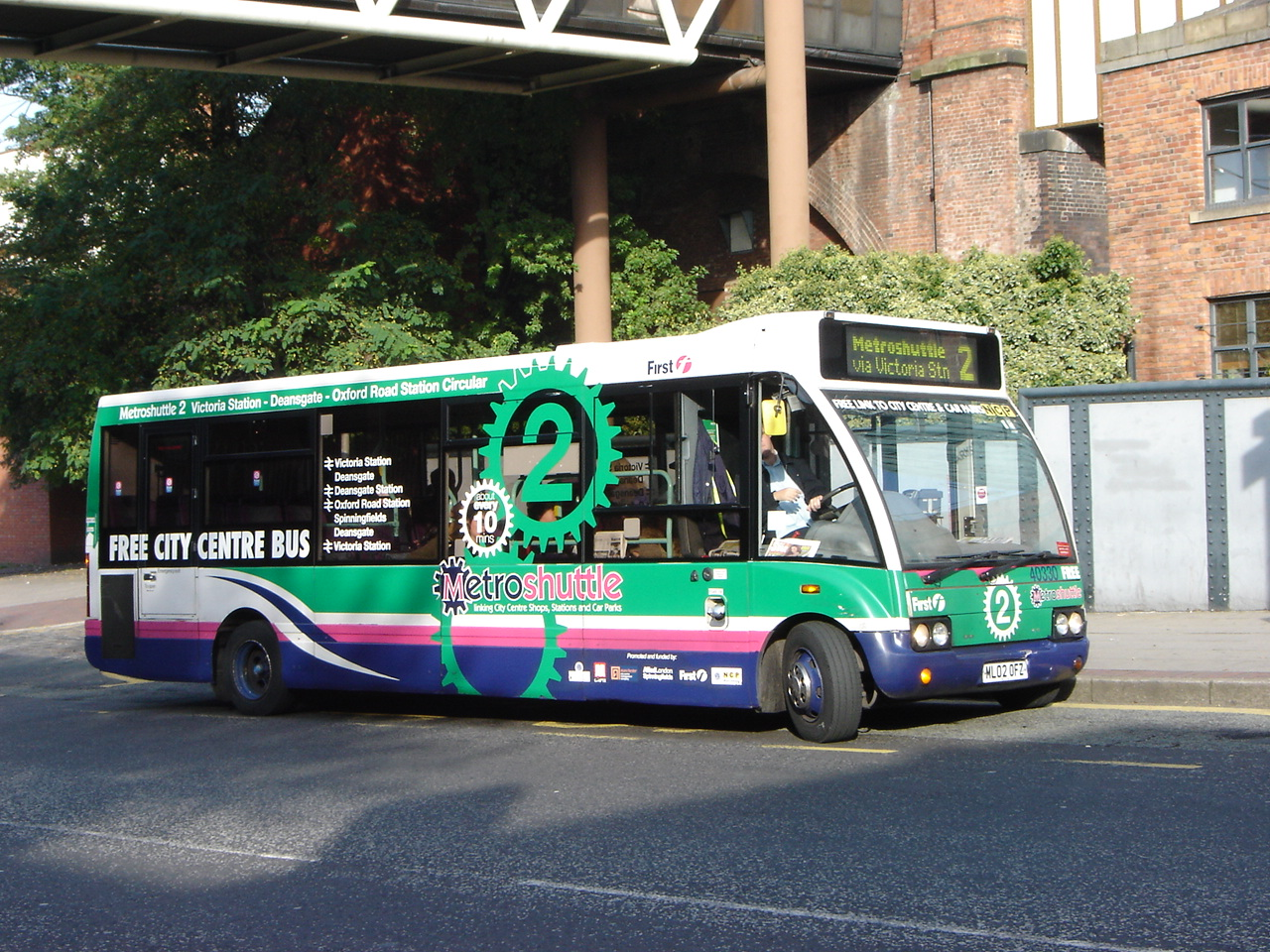
First Manchester Optare Solo on Manchester route 2 in October 2007

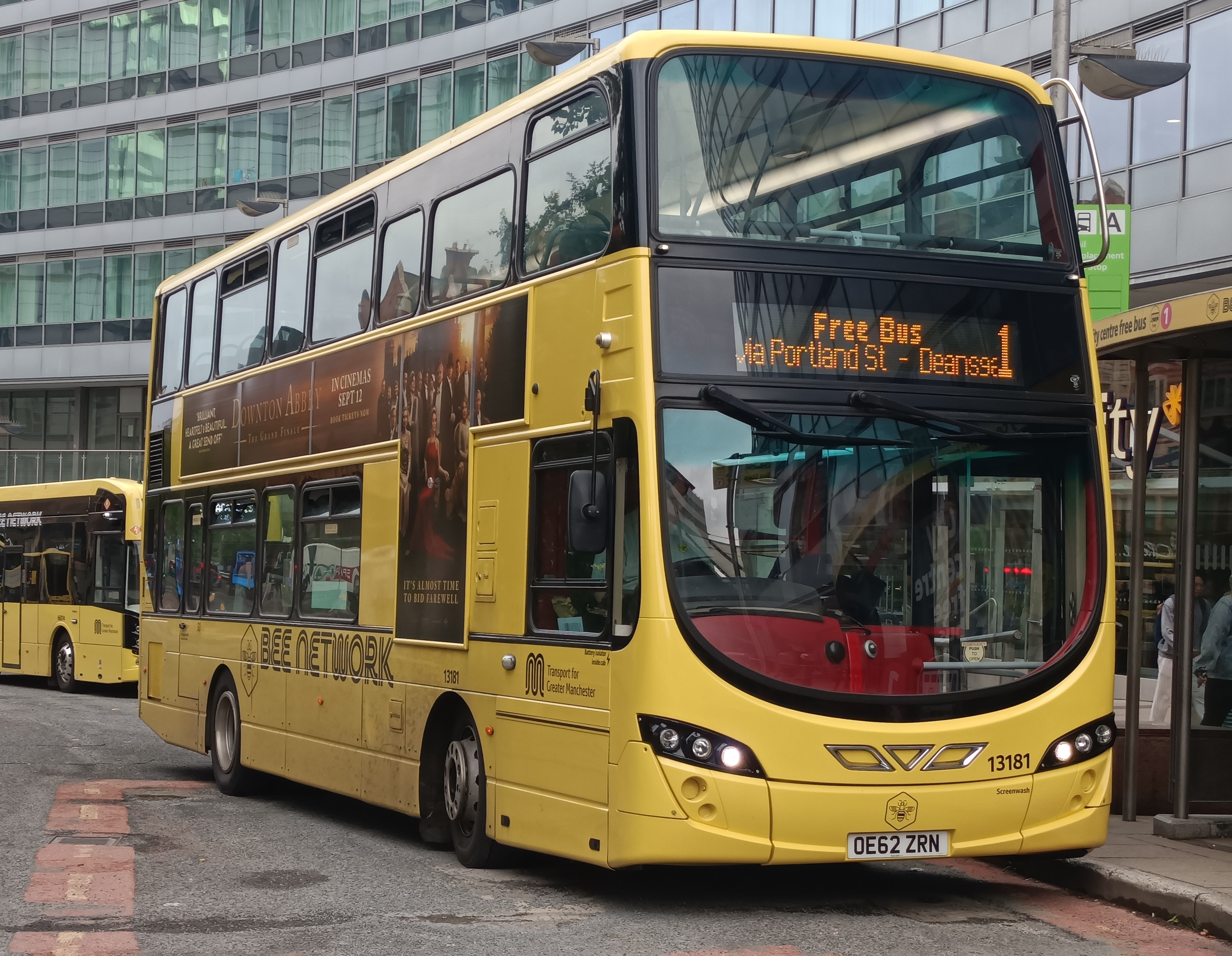
Stagecoach Manchester Wright Eclipse Gemini 2 bodied Volvo B5LH on free bus route 1 in September 2025

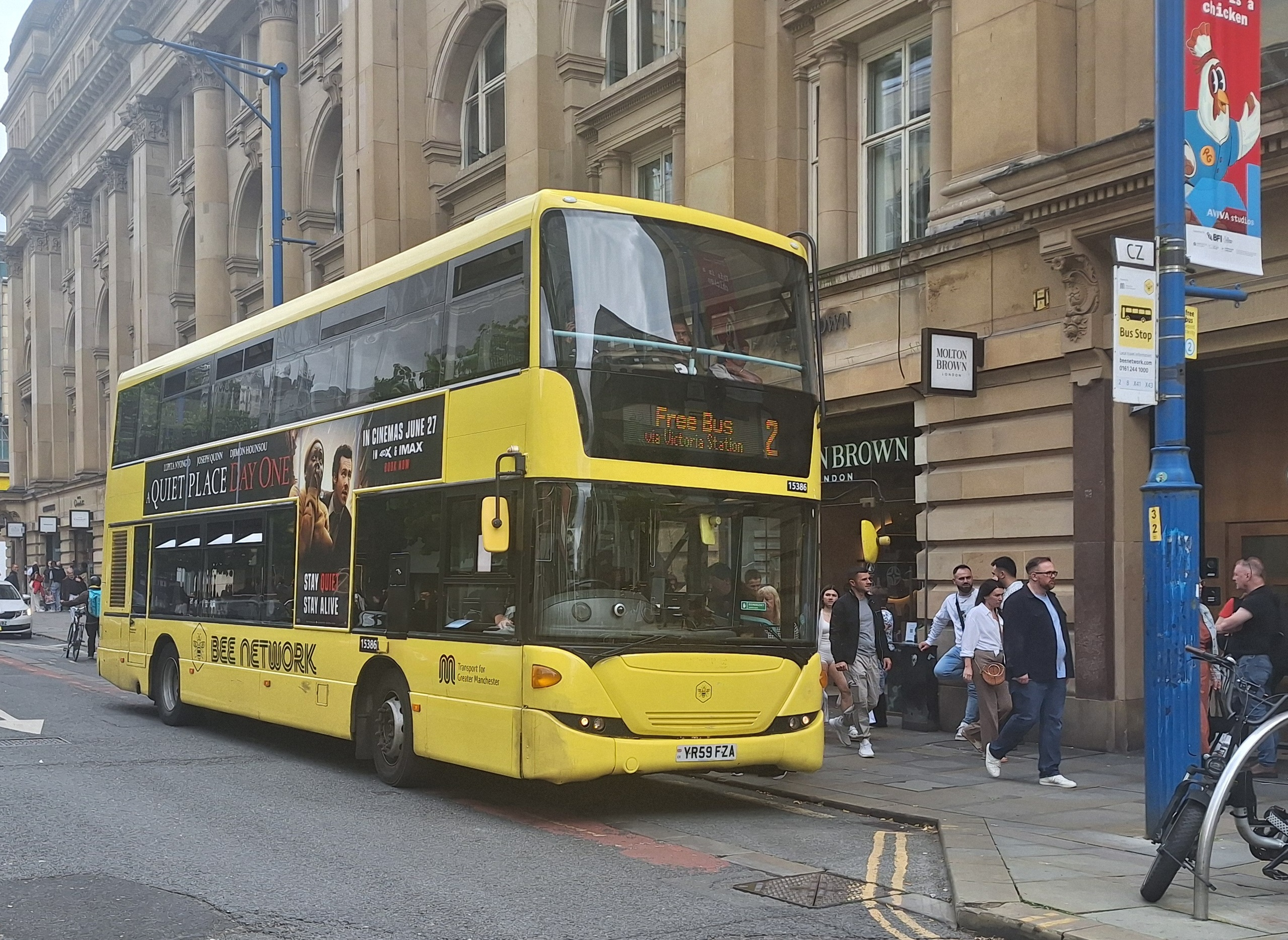
Stagecoach Manchester Scania OmniCity on free bus route 2 in July 2024

Centreline continued to provide inter-station transit links for several years. After bus deregulation, the service was operated by GM Buses. In 1992, the new Metrolink light rail system began operating across Manchester city centre, providing an electric tram link between the mainline stations, although Centreline continued to operate. In 2002, the Centreline name disappeared from Manchester streets as the service was rebranded as Metroshuttle. First Manchester was chosen by Transport for Greater Manchester (TfGM) to operate the service and has retained the contract. Two routes were introduced, numbered 1 and 2. The service was extremely successful. Route 3 was introduced in September 2005 and links additional areas of the city centre.

From 28 October 2018, due to declining passenger numbers, the service was reduced to 2 routes, and rebranded as free bus. Both routes were taken over by Go North West on 2 June 2019 with part of the First Greater Manchester business.

=== Partnership ===
Manchester's Metroshuttle is a partnership between TfGM, Manchester City Council, National Car Parks and the property developer Allied London. The service is zero-fare (free) and does not require any tickets or passes. Allied London own the Spinningfields mixed-use development and all three routes serve this site. The service is also partially supported by advertising. First Greater Manchester provides a publicity contribution. The free service costs approximately £1.2 million each year.

=== Routes ===
==== 2002–2018 ====
Metroshuttle was a partnership between Transport for Greater Manchester, Manchester City Council, National Car Parks and the property developer Allied London. The service is zero-fare (free) and does not require any tickets or passes.

The Manchester Metroshuttle network consisted of three services, each operated by First Greater Manchester. The services were originally operated using a dedicated fleet of 18 Optare Solo minibuses with route branding applied for all services, Route 1 (orange), Route 2 (green), Route 3 (purple). Some Solos carried a generic livery, consisting of silver-grey in place of the route colours allowing them to be used on any route. In November 2010, 20 electric hybrids Optare Versas replaced the Solos. In July 2014, three electric Optare Versas were introduced. Metroshuttle bus stops also share the same route colour of the appropriate bus stopping there.

Metroshuttle route 1 and route 2 began operating in September 2002 and replaced the previous Centreline city centre operation. Allied London owned the Spinningfields mixed-use development that was served by the route. Metroshuttle route 3 began operating in September 2005, linking additional areas of the city.

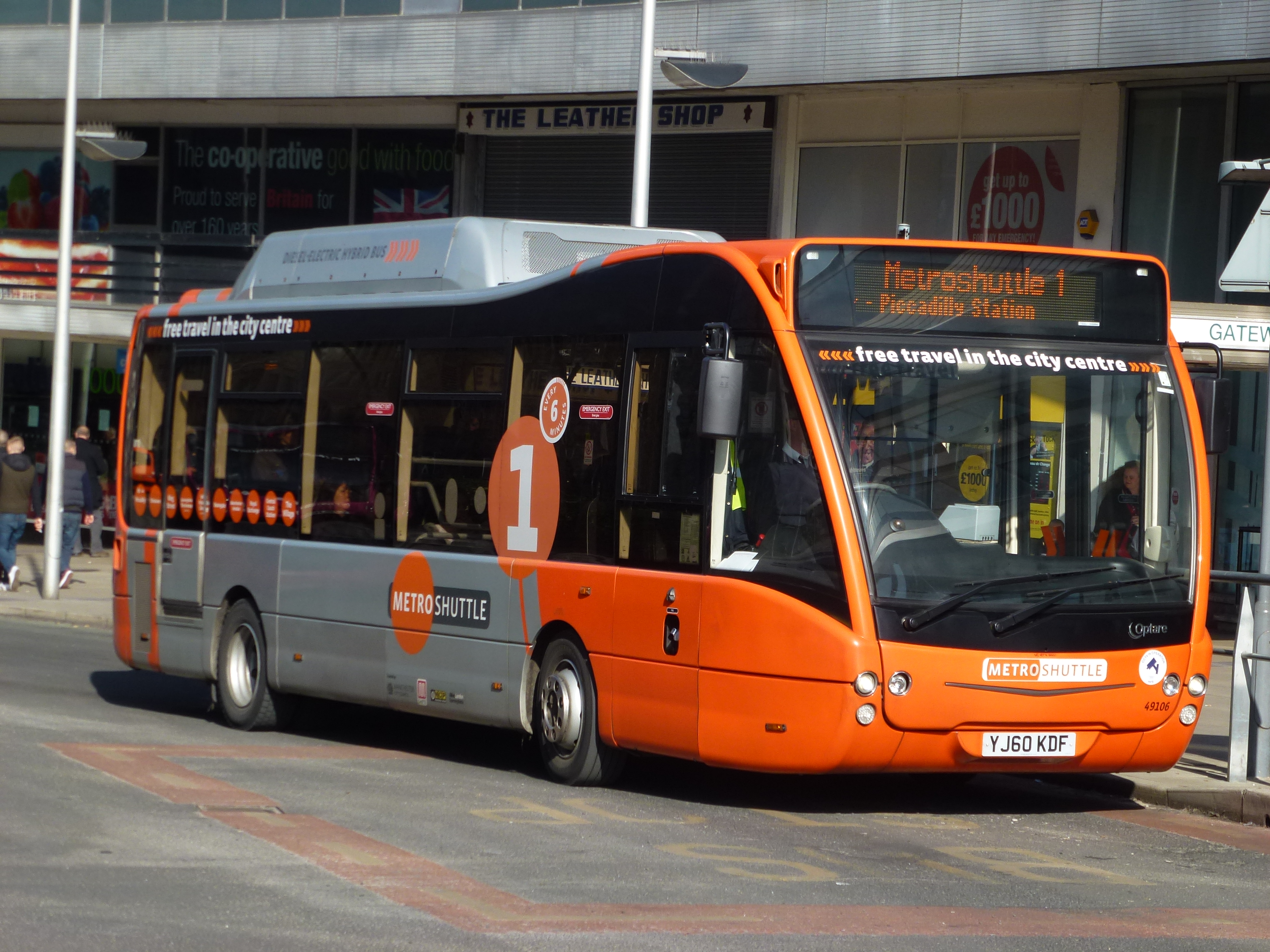
Metroshuttle Route 1 bus

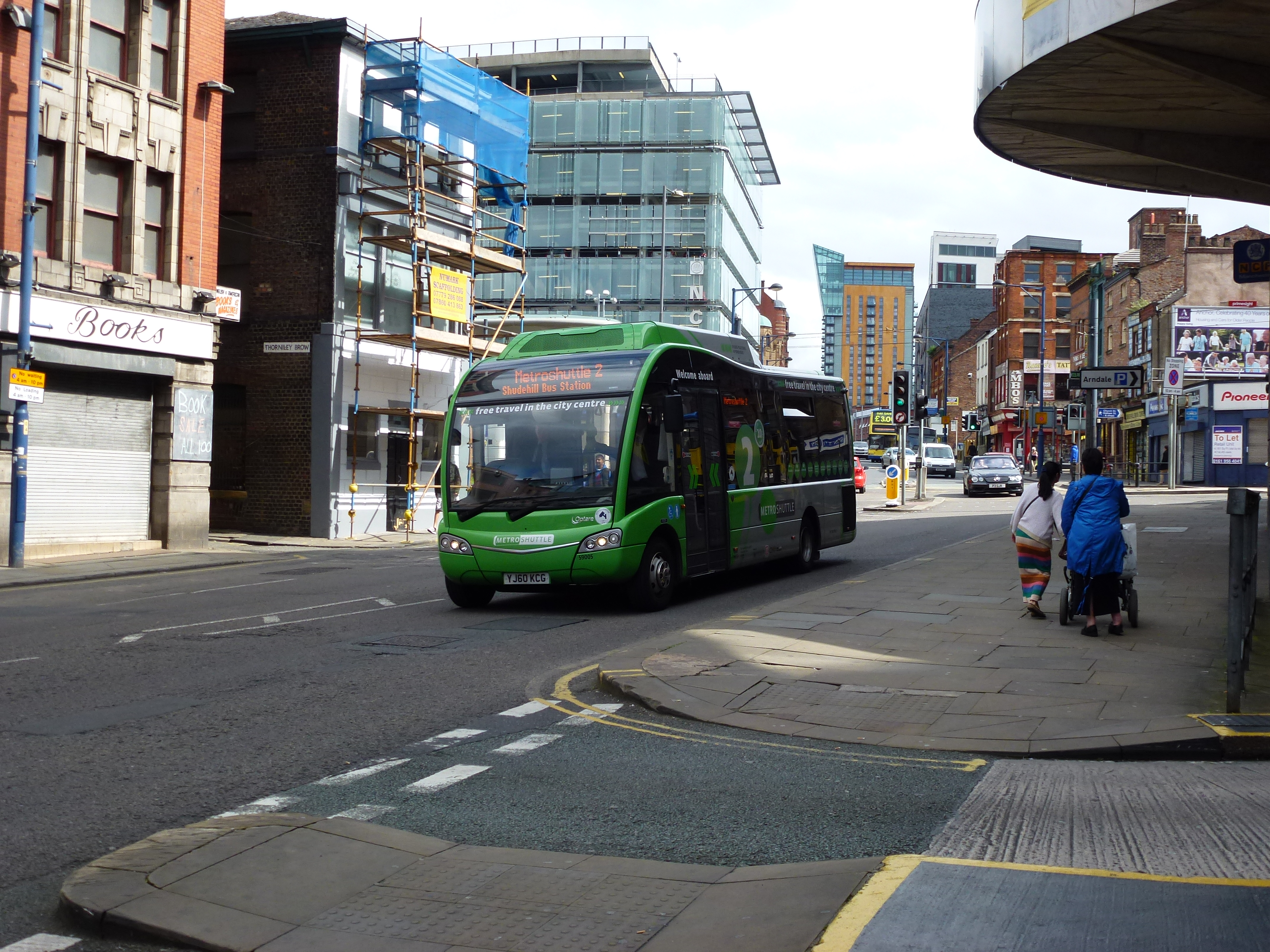
Metroshuttle Route 2 bus

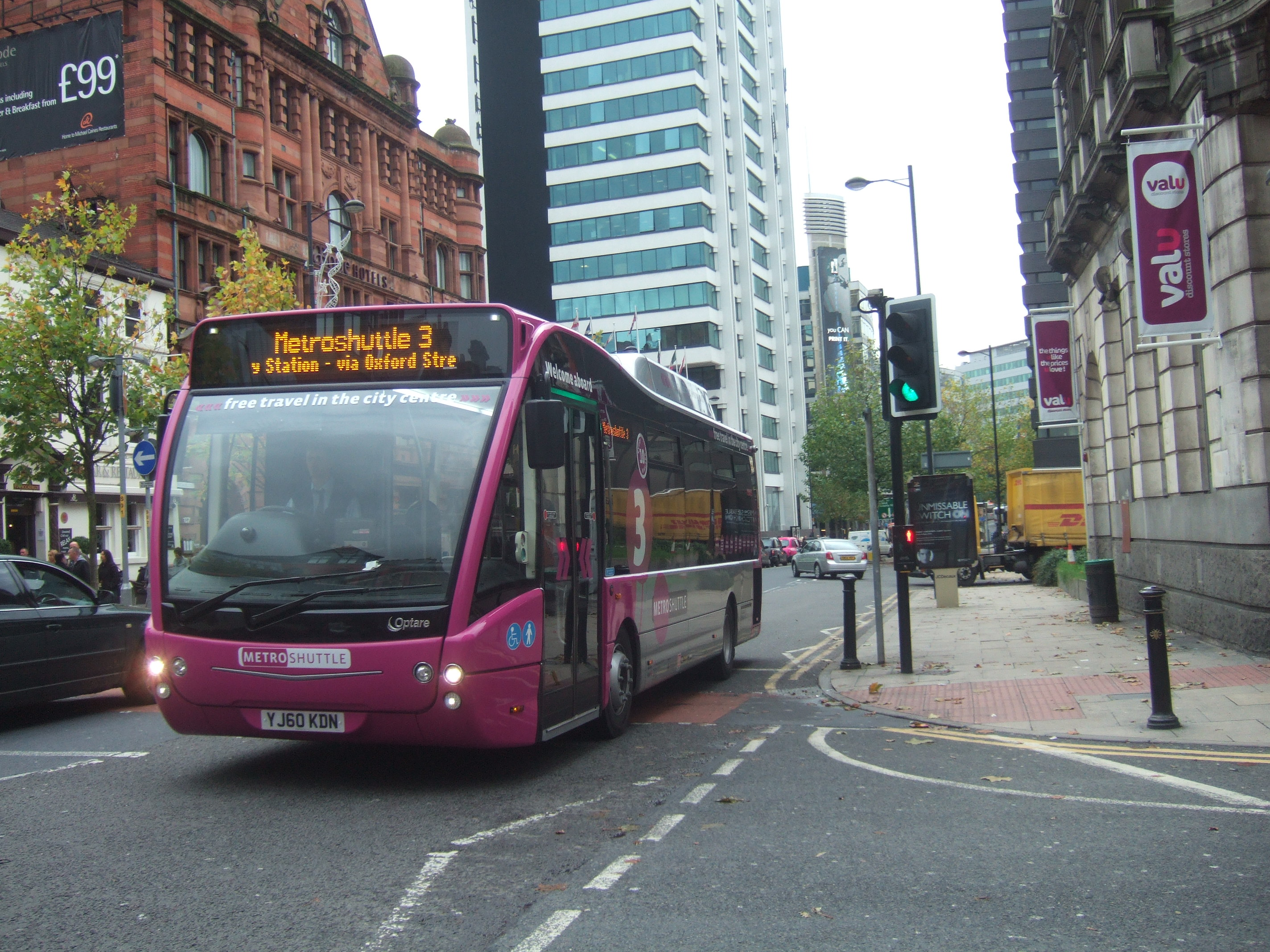
Metroshuttle Route 3 bus

==== 2018–2024 ====
The new 2018 service has merged route 3 to routes 1 & 2, and require 10 buses to operate both routes, and operated by Go North West. From 28 October 2018 to 2024, free bus operated the following routes:

- Route 1: Piccadilly station - Piccadilly Gardens - Market Street - Spinningfields - St Peter's Square - Chorlton Street coach station - Piccadilly station
- Route 2: Piccadilly station - Oxford Road station - Deansgate - Victoria station - Shudehill Interchange - the Northern Quarter - Piccadilly station

At peak hours (Monday to Friday, 06:30 – 09:10 and 16:00 – 18:30), route 2 additionally ran via Salford Central station.

Both services operated every 10 minutes during the day, every 15 minutes after 18:30, and every 12 minutes on Sundays and Bank Holidays.

==== 2024 ====
The new 2024 routes require a maximum of 4 buses per route, both routes are operated by Stagecoach Manchester as part of the second trenche of Bee Network. On non-bank holiday weekdays and Saturday evenings, only a single bus per route will be in half hourly operation.

1 Free Bus	2 Free Bus
Circular route: Piccadilly Rail Station; Piccadilly Gardens (Stop EX) 200m; Charlotte Street (Stop CU) 200m; Hart Street (Stop SM); Palace Theatre; Oxford Road Rail Station (Stop E); Gloucester Street; Deansgate Rail Station (Stop C); Deansgate Rail Station (Stop A) 100m; Barton Street (Stop WO); Science and Industry Museum; Lower Byrom Street; Manchester Crown Court 300m; St Mary's Parsonage (Stop WF); Cheapside (Stop CO); George Street 150m; Chorlton Street Coach Station (Stop EV); Shena Simon Campus (Stop EU); Minshull Street; Piccadilly Rail Station; Operator: Stagecoach Manchester; Garage: Queens Road; Monday–Friday: 07:00–19:00 every 10 minutes, 19:00–23:30 every 30 minutes Saturday: 07:00–08:00 every 30 minutes, 08:00–09:00 every 15 minutes, 09:00–19:00 every 10 minutes, 19:00–23:30 every 30 minutes Sunday: 10:00–18:00 every 10 minutes	Circular route: Piccadilly Rail Station; Piccadilly Gardens (Stop EX) 200m; Chinatown Charlotte Street (Stop CR) 200m; Cheapside (Stop CL); Parsonage (Stop NC); Printworks (Stop NK); Shudehill Interchange (Stand H); Turner Street (Stop NZ) 150m; Tib Street (Stop CC) 150m; Piccadilly Gardens (Stop S) 150m; Chorlton Street Coach Station (Stop EV); Shena Simon Campus (Stop EU); Minshull Street; Piccadilly Rail Station; Operator: Stagecoach Manchester; Garage: Queens Road; Monday–Friday: 07:00–19:00 every 10 minutes, 19:00–23:15 every 30 minutes Saturday: 07:00–08:00 every 30 minutes, 08:00–09:00 every 15 minutes, 09:00–19:00 every 10 minutes, 19:00–23:15 every 30 minutes Sunday: 10:00–18:00 every 10 minutes

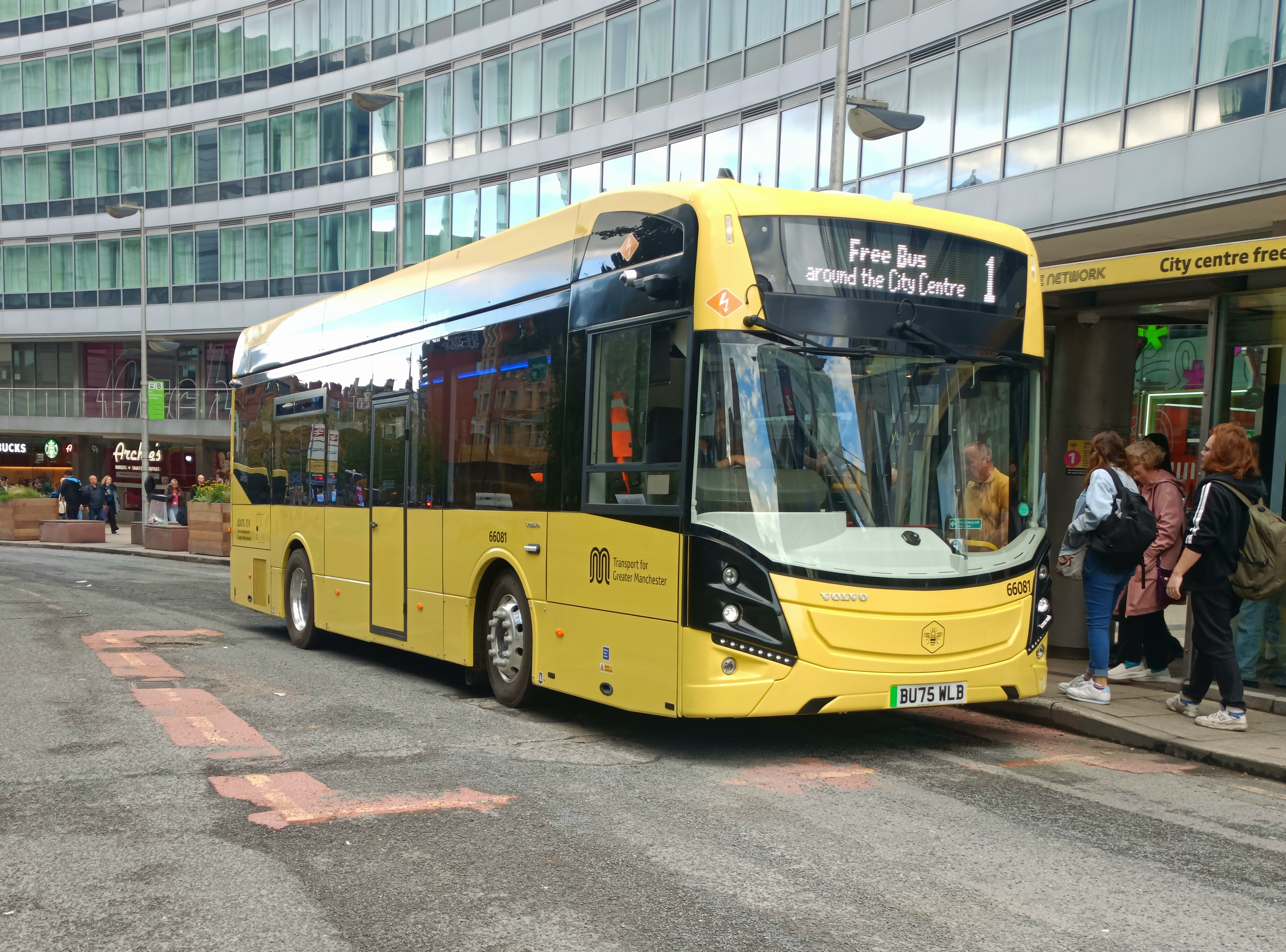
Free bus route 1

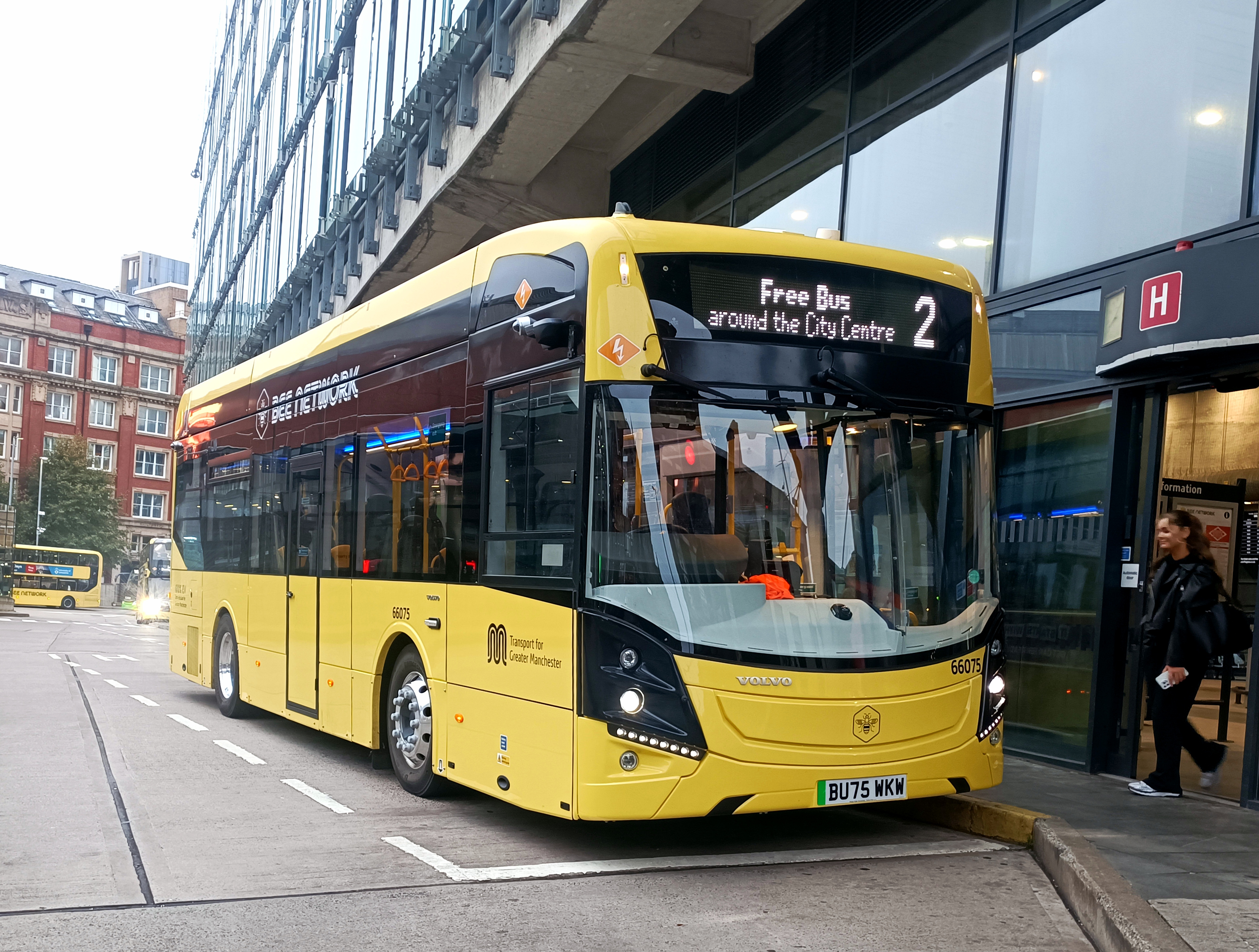
Free bus route 2

== Bolton ==
=== History ===
Bolton's Metroshuttle first began operating on 17 November 2008 and follows a similar operation to Manchester's Metroshuttle on a 12-month trial. Bluebird Bus & Coach was chosen by TfGM to operate the service. The company ran the service until 25 January 2010, when Maytree Travel took over the operation of the service. The service has been re-routed on three occasions, the first to serve the Sainsbury's supermarket in the town, and then again in January 2011, when the service was given a 12-month contract extension and re-routed to serve the university and the adjoining Bolton One leisure and health centre. This route change saw the service reduced from every 10 minutes to every 15 minutes.

In November 2012, it was announced that the contract for the service had been extended for another year and that South Lancs Travel had been successful in winning the tender for the Bolton Metroshuttle. The company took over the operation of the service from 31 December 2012 and uses Optare Versa diesel hybrid vehicles purchased by Transport for Greater Manchester. The route was again amended, with the University/Bolton One section of route removed. This saw the frequency increase to every 12 minutes.

Following a further contract extension the tender for the Bolton Metroshuttle was won by Cumfybus who took over the service in 2013. The Transport for Greater Manchester (TFGM) vehicles transferred from Diamond North West to Cumfybus's Bolton depot.

On 4 September 2017 Bolton's new transport Interchange on Great Moor Street opened and all services transferred from the old Moor Lane Bus Station. This saw many local bus services being subjected to route changes. The Bolton Metroshuttle was amended to serve a newly installed stop outside Bolton Market which would now be the first stop after departing the interchange. The frequency was reduced to every 15 minutes to allow for this extra routing.

After the latest tender process the Bolton Metroshuttle has been operated by Vision Bus since 3 January 2018.

The Service was Discontinued in 10th April 2021.

=== Partnership ===
Bolton's Metroshuttle is a partnership between TfGM and Bolton Council. The service is completely zero-fare (free) and does not require any tickets or passes. The free service will cost approximately £200,000 per year.

=== Route ===
Bolton's Metroshuttle originally consisted of two 25-seater Alexander Dennis Enviro200 single decker buses, with black and red route branding, although this changed following Maytree Travel taking over the service, who replaced it with a blue branding. In 2012 Transport for Greater Manchester provided two Optare Versa diesel-electric hybrid vehicles in a blue version of the Metroshuttle branding similar to the livery of the vehicles provided for the Manchester and Stockport Metroshuttle services.

The service starts at Stand F at Bolton Interchange, before serving Bolton Market (next to the old Moor Lane Bus station) and looping back to the train station and running anti-clockwise around the town centre using existing stops within the town centre before returning to the Interchange.

Route 500
- Bolton Interchange
- Bolton Market
- Newport Street - For Bolton Railway Station
- Sainsbury's Superstore
- Bradshawgate - for Crompton Place Shopping Centre
- Deansgate
- Bridge Street – for Market Place Shopping Centre and The Light Cinema
- Bath Street - for NCP Multi-storey Car Park
- Knowsley Street – for Market Place Shopping Centre
- Deansgate (West) - for Bolton Town Hall, Albert Halls and Central Post Office
- Black Horse Street stop CC – for Bolton Market and Octagon Theatre
- Bolton Interchange

Operator: Vision Bus
Times:
09:00–17:00 Monday-Saturday, every 15 minutes

== Stockport ==
=== History ===
Stockport's Metroshuttle first began operating during Christmas 2007 as a complementary shuttle designed to help ferry the elderly and disabled around Stockport more easily. It was reintroduced on 29 November 2008 as permanent fixture. Branded the Stockport Shuttle Bus it was operated by Solutions SK on behalf of Stockport Council, before operations switched to Freshfield Coaches the following month, after it was revealed that SolutionsSK had been operating the service with a freight licence. The service was re-branded in August 2009 to form part of the Metroshuttle network, and was given a new livery to mark the change. Prior to this, the fleet (consisting of Optare Solos) were unpainted and fairly run down, even lacking roll blinds. The fleet was replaced with new Alexander Dennis Enviro200s, fitted with digital displays. In 2010, the operator of the service changed, with Oldham based Swan's Travel taking over the service on a short-term basis, before being replaced by Bluebird in October 2010. Bluebird ran the service until March 2011, when the service was taken over by Stagecoach Manchester, who run the majority of services in Stockport. Stagecoach ran the service until 1 July 2012, when it was transferred to Arriva North West's Wythenshawe depot. After late 2012 Manchester Community Transport ran the service with 3 Optare Versa diesel hybrid vehicles purchased by Transport for Greater Manchester but also ran it with other buses in Stockport depot. The service was withdrawn on 27 April 2019.

=== Route ===
Stockport's Metroshuttle ran in two loops around Stockport town centre and use existing stops, as well as dedicated stops in areas where other services do not operate within the town centre. The service started from Stockport bus station and ran to Stockport railway station via Grand Central Stockport before returning to the bus station then via Mersey Square, Bridgefield Street, Warren Street (for Sainsbury's and Asda), Great Portland Street to Tesco before returning via Knightsbridge, Warren Street (for Sainsbury's and Asda again), Millgate, Churchgate, Little Underbank and Great Underbank to Stockport Bus Station.

Route 300
- Stockport bus station (Stand C) – for Hat Works
- St Peter's Square
- High Street
- Piccadilly – for Magistrates Court
- Edward Street – for Stockport Town Hall
- Stockport railway station – for railway station and Grand Central Leisure Complex
- Exchange Street – for Garrick Theatre
- Stockport bus station (Stand W)
- Mersey Square – for Merseyway Shopping Centre
- Bridgefield Street
- Princes Street
- Warren Street – for Sainsbury's & Asda
- Great Portwood Street – for Peel Centre & retail park
- Tesco Extra
- Great Portwood Street – for Peel Centre & retail park
- Knightsbridge
- Bridge Street
- Warren Street – for Sainsbury's & Asda
- Churchgate – for Staircase House & Stockport Market
- Wellington Street
- Lower Hillgate
- Great Underbank
- Chestergate – for Air Raid Shelter
- Stockport bus station (stand C)

Operator: Manchester Community Transport
Times:
08:00–18:00 Monday-Saturday, every 12 minutes
10:30–17:00 Sunday, every 12 minutes

== Oldham ==
=== History ===
In June 2012, the Manchester Metrolink tram network started running services to Oldham with trams running to a temporary Oldham Mumps tram stop located near the former railway station before trams started running through the town centre and through a new Oldham Mumps stop in 2014. Following criticism of long walks up steep hils into the town centre from passengers, Transport for Greater Manchester and Oldham Council organised a free service linking the tram stop with the town centre.

The service was branded as Metroshuttle and started service on 30 July 2012 running a half-hourly service. From 1 October 2012, the service increased to every 20 minutes with Optare Versa hybrids, similar to the ones used on the Manchester Metroshuttle services, also introduced.

The service was extended to run until 20:00 on Thursdays from mid-November 2012 until Christmas and also on weekdays on the week before Christmas to appeal to Christmas shoppers in Oldham. The service continued until the town began to be served by Metrolink.

=== Route ===
Oldham's Metroshuttle starts outside the Metrolink station on Victoria Street. The service then heads to Oldham town centre along the Oldham Way by-pass (A62 before heading into town via King Street stopping near Mecca Bingo. The service had previously run temporarily to the Manchester Street roundabout and then up Manchester Street, stopping outside Aldi while King Street was closed due to the Metrolink work going on in the town centre.

From King Street, the service continues into the town centre and the bus station, stopping at the Cheapside station at stand C. The route then follows the same route as several of the fare-paying services via St Mary's Way, Lord Street, Yorkshire Street and Princes Street back onto the Oldham Way before looping around to the tram stop on the other side of the carriageway via Huddersfield Road, Cross Street and Lees Road. An additional stop on Lees Road was introduced from October 2012.

Route 400
- Oldham Mumps tram stop for trams to Manchester city centre, Chorlton and St Werburgh's Road
- King Street – for Oldham College and Oldham Sixth Form College
- Oldham bus station (stand C) – for buses, Town Square/Spindles shopping centre, Magistrates Court and Civic Centre
- Lord Street (stop LB) – for Oldham Sports Centre and Tommyfield Market
- Yorkshire Street (stop YB) – for Oldham library, Sainsburys and Town Square/Spindles shopping centre
- Yorkshire Street (stop A)
- Lees Road/Cross Street
- Oldham Mumps tram stop

Operator: Manchester Community Transport
Times:
09:40–16:20 daily, every 20 minutes

== Future ==
Following the success of Metroshuttle, Transport for Greater Manchester have been studying the feasibility of introducing Metroshuttle routes in other towns in Greater Manchester, to provide a high-quality town centre bus service that links key public transport nodes and car parks with the main retail, commercial, leisure and cultural destinations within town centres.

Other towns like Bury and Wigan had been mentioned to gain routes, however, the chances of this happening were reduced following the rejection of the Manchester Congestion Charge in December 2008. However, Oldham gained a Metroshuttle service in July 2012. But the route was now withdrawn.
