= Bluebird Bus and Coach =

Former bus operator in Greater Manchester, England

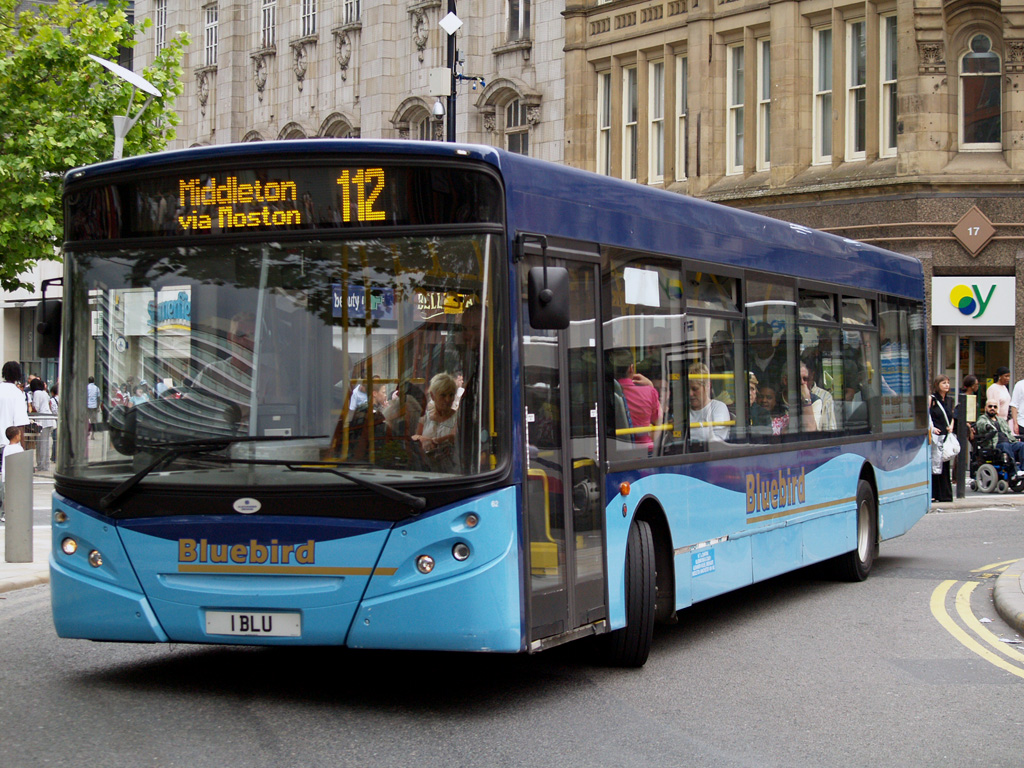
- Alexander Dennis Enviro 300 on route 112 in Manchester in July 2008
- Parent: Michael Dunstan
- Founded: July 1988
- Ceased operation: 3 March 2013
- Headquarters: Greengate
- Service area: Greater Manchester
- Service type: Bus operator
- Hubs: Middleton bus station
- Depots: 1
- Fleet: 49 (May 2012)
- Website: www.bluebirdbus.co.uk

Bluebird Bus & Coach was a bus operator based in Greengate in Chadderton, Greater Manchester between July 1988 and March 2013.

== History ==
Bluebird Bus & Coach was formed in July 1988 when Tom Dunstan, a former Greater Manchester PTE area manager, bought a small coach company called Bluebird of Middleton. Tom Dunstan died in 2004 and the company was taken over by his son Michael. The first route operated was commercial service 112, which was followed by a number of contracted routes. In 2006 and 2007, Bluebird expanded its operating area to Oldham introducing buses on routes 181, 182, 402, 410 and 411.

In November 2008, Bluebird was the first operator to run the Bolton Metroshuttle service before being replaced by Maytree Travel in January 2010, although the company would resume running a Metroshuttle service later that year, when they took the operation of the Stockport Metroshuttle service from Swan's Travel, although their Metroshuttle operation ended in March 2011, when the Stockport Metroshuttle service was taken over by Stagecoach Manchester.

On 7 November 2012, it was announced that Stagecoach Manchester had purchased the business, although the deal was subject to clearance from the Office of Fair Trading and was approved on 22 February 2013. The purchase included Bluebird's 40 vehicles, 80 staff members and its lease on the depot at Greengate and was completed on 3 March 2013.

== Fleet ==
As at May 2012, the fleet consisted of 49 buses.
