= Stagecoach Manchester =

Bus operator in Greater Manchester, England

- A Bee Network branded Wright StreetDeck Electroliner at Shudehill Interchange in September 2026
- Parent: Stagecoach Group
- Founded: 25 February 1996; 30 years ago
- Headquarters: Cheetham Hill, Manchester, England
- Service area: Greater Manchester, Cheshire, Derbyshire, West Yorkshire
- Service type: Bus services
- Routes: 155
- Hubs: Manchester; Bury; Oldham; Stockport; Tameside; Trafford
- Depots: 5
- Fleet: 596 (January 2025)
- Website: Official website

Stagecoach Manchester is a major bus operator in Greater Manchester, England. It provides local bus services under contract to the Bee Network, which was developed by Transport for Greater Manchester (TfGM).

== History ==
=== GM Buses South ===
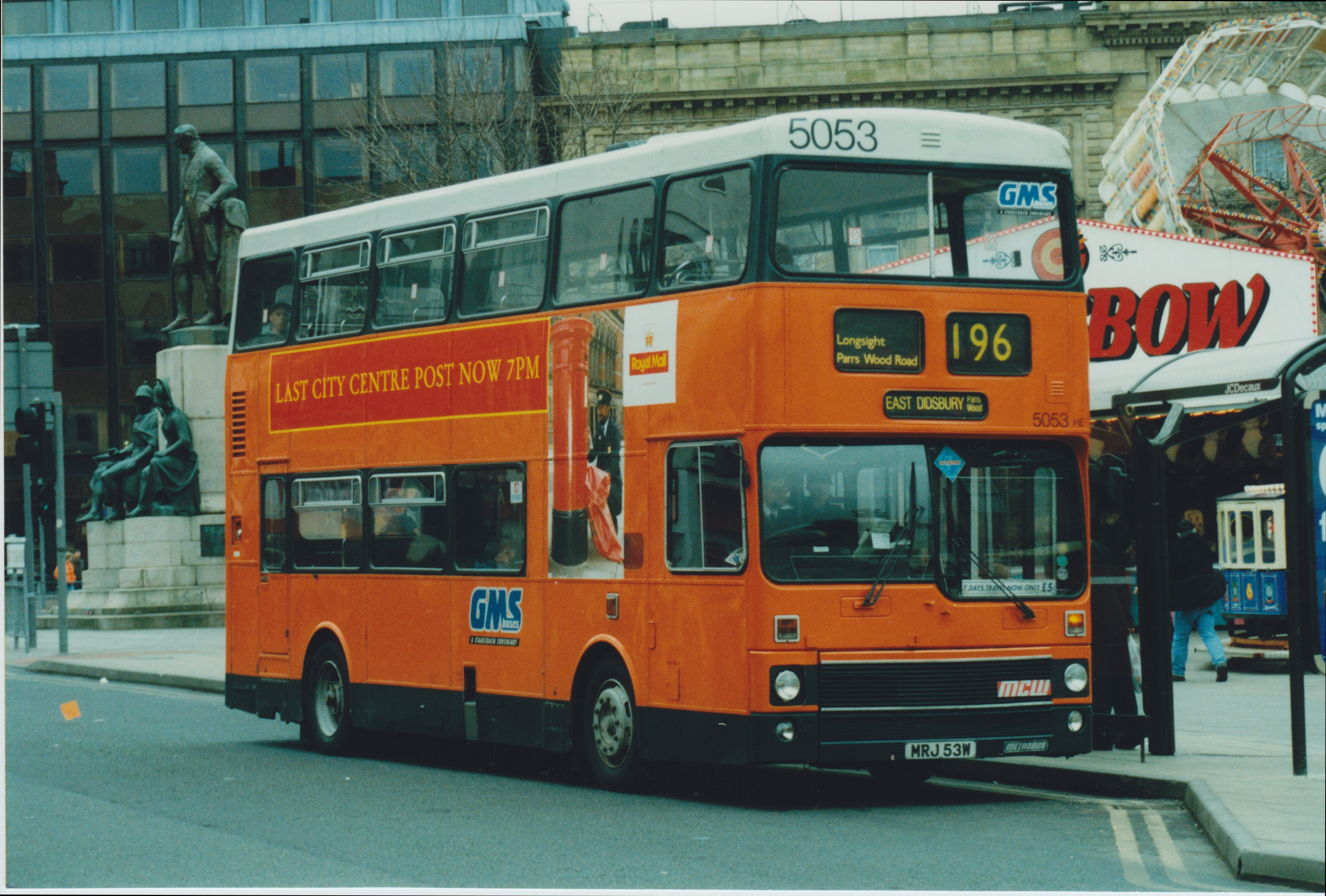
A GM Buses South MCW Metrobus in central Manchester

Before deregulation in October 1986, buses in the Greater Manchester area were publicly funded and operated under the name of Greater Manchester Transport, which later became known as GM Buses. It was owned by the metropolitan borough and city councils of Greater Manchester, but were operated at arm's length from the local town halls.

In December 1993, GM Buses was split in two companies: GM Buses North and GM Buses South. It was planned that the two companies would compete against one another, however they operated without doing so through to their respective buyouts.

In April 1994, GM Buses South was sold in a management buyout for £16 million (equivalent to £33,760,000 in 2025). GM Buses South faced an uphill struggle as over 40 competitors were running on routes in and around central Manchester following deregulation, with the Bee Line Buzz Company, MTL Manchester, Finglands Coachways, Mayne and Walls being the operator's main competitors on the lucrative south Manchester routes.

In response to increasing competition by MTL, GM Buses South set up Birkenhead & District in 1994, running Daimler Fleetlines in the blue and cream livery of the former Birkenhead Corporation. This new company operated in direction competition with MTL in the Wirral region until June 1995, when it was closed due to heavy competition rendering the company unprofitable.

==== Stagecoach Ribble competition ====
Perth-based Stagecoach Holdings initially set up Stagecoach Manchester as a sub-brand of its Ribble Motor Services subsidiary in January 1994, in order to compete on route 192 between Manchester, Stockport and Hazel Grove, directly undercutting GM Buses South's fares on the route by half. Stagecoach marketed the operation as The Friendlier 192, claiming to beat all competitors along the route in terms of price and performance; it ran the route mainly using a new fleet of eighteen Alexander Dash-bodied Volvo B6 midibuses based from a single depot in Bredbury.

Throughout 1994, GM Buses South bought a large number of secondhand buses, mainly Leyland Atlanteans and Leyland Nationals, while Stagecoach responded with more new buses in the shape of Alexander PS-bodied Volvo B10Ms. In retaliation for competition on route 192, GM Buses South used its Charterplan coach fleet to compete with Stagecoach Ribble's route X43 to Burnley. By March 1995, however, competition between both operators ceased when Stagecoach agreed to no further competition on route 192, resulting in GM Buses South withdrawing services on the X43. Stagecoach Ribble loaned 20 redundant Alexander Dashes to GM Buses South the following April, and following an attempt to compete with GM Buses North in Salford, eventually sold Stagecoach Manchester, as well as 13 buses based at its Bredbury depot, to EYMS Group subsidiary Finglands Coachways in November 1995.

=== Stagecoach ownership ===
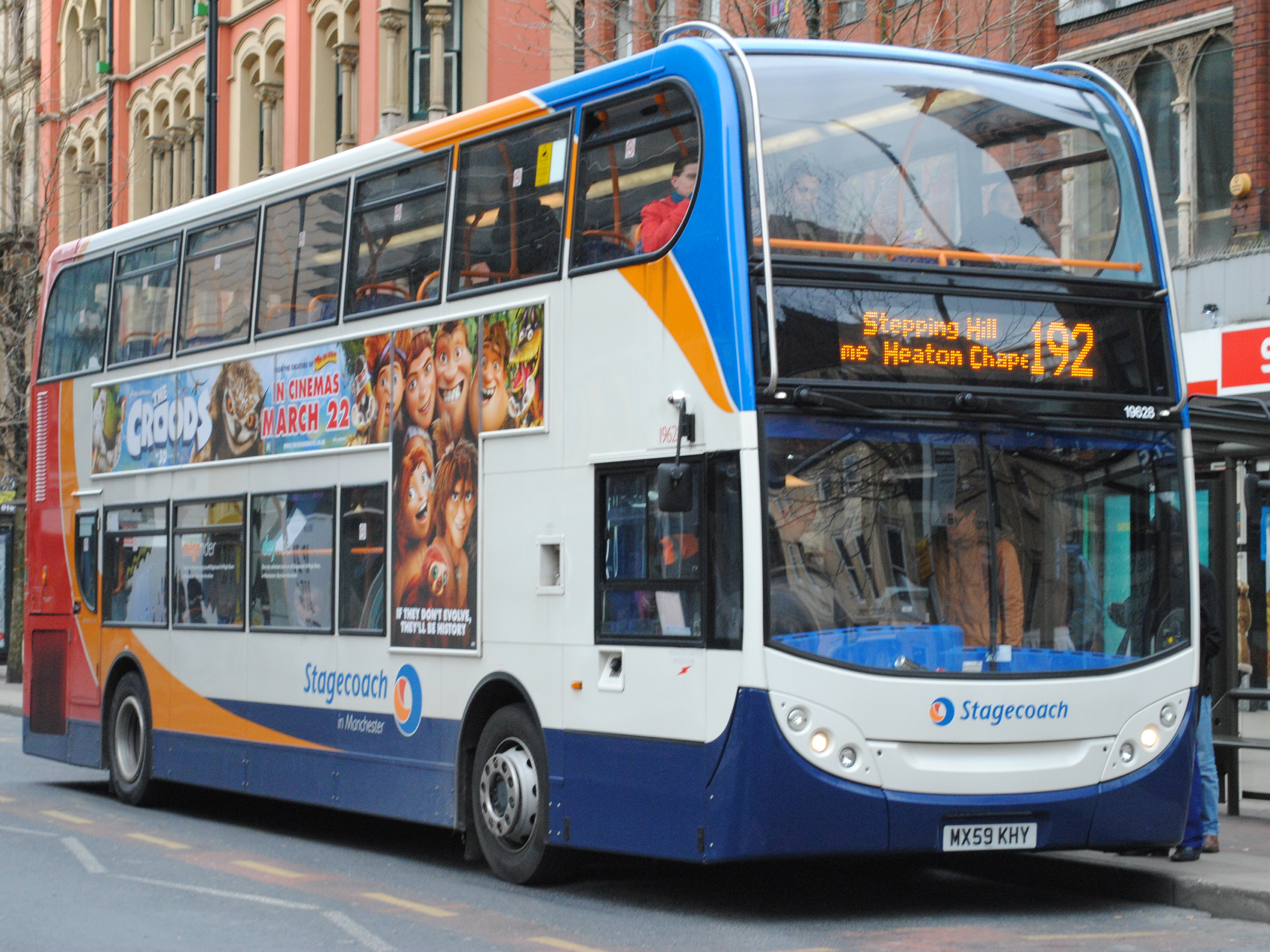
An Alexander Dennis Enviro400 in corporate 'beachball' livery, March 2013

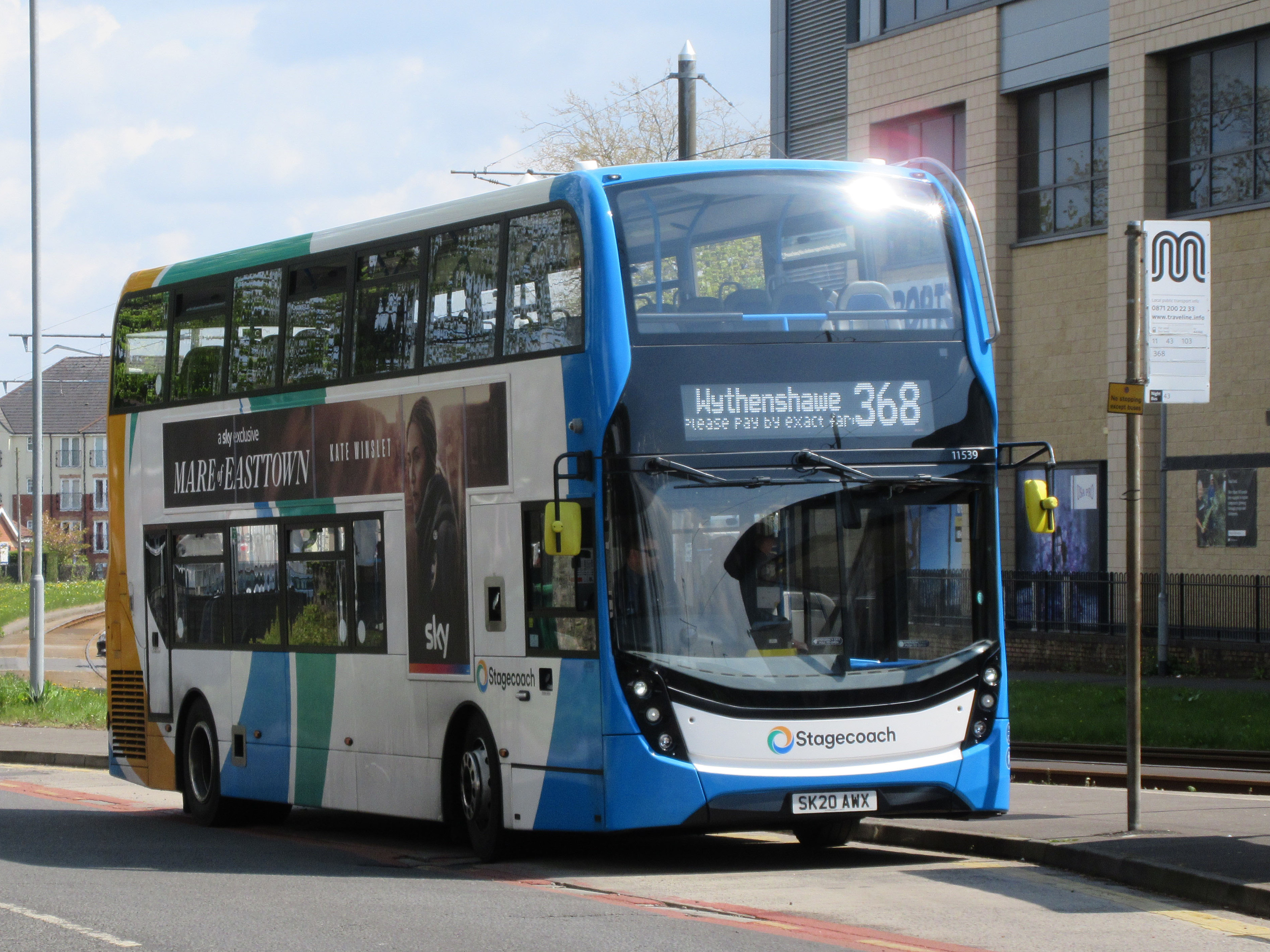
An Alexander Dennis Enviro400 MMC in corporate 'local' livery in Wythenshawe, May 2021

On 25 February 1996, GM Buses South was sold to Stagecoach for £40.7 million (equivalent to £81,694,000 in 2025), despite criticism from the Labour Party and protests from pensioners outside the Free Trade Hall. GM Buses South was rebranded as Stagecoach Manchester shortly after the sale, despite Stagecoach claiming that the GM Buses South brand would be retained, with new vehicles in the group's corporate livery delivered the following March. The existing Charterplan Travel coaching arm and commercial driver training company GMS Training remained unaffected by the rebranding; however, Charterplan was later sold to the EYMS Group the following May, being integrated into the operator's East Yorkshire Travel coaching arm.

Stagecoach consolidated its position in Manchester with the acquisition of multiple independent operators between the 1990s and early 2010s, as well as taking on competition from operators such as UK North. Stagecoach's first acquisition was that of Walls Coaches, involving only the routes and 25 members of staff, due to the owner's retirement in November 1997. In March 2005, Stagecoach purchased Dennis's of Dukinfield and, on 21 January 2008, Stagecoach Manchester purchased the bus operations of A Mayne & Son, with 38 buses all transferred to Hyde Road garage.

On 10 August 2008, Stagecoach Manchester purchased the bus operations of Bullocks Coaches, with Bullocks retaining their coach hire business and Oxford Road Link route 147, which remained as a subsidised link to the University of Manchester. On 3 March 2013, Stagecoach purchased Bluebird Bus and Coach, taking on 40 buses, 80 staff and its garage lease at Greengate; on 26 April 2014, Stagecoach took over the business of JPT Bus Company of Middleton.

Stagecoach Manchester's largest acquisition was that of First Greater Manchester's Wigan operation for £12 million in October 2012. The transaction the Wigan garage and 300 employees, 120 vehicles (Note: Only 20 of the buses were owned by TfGM.) purchased by the former Mayne legal entity. The business was operated under the brand of Stagecoach in Wigan before being integrated into Stagecoach Manchester later, with services mainly ran in the Wigan and Leigh areas, whilst also making connections to Manchester and Salford on certain routes.

The first autonomous bus trial in the United Kingdom commenced in mid-2019, using a modified Alexander Dennis Enviro200 MMC single-decker bus equipped with new software. This was able to operate in driverless mode within Stagecoach Manchester's Sharston bus garage, performing tasks such as driving to the washing station, refuelling point and then parking up at a dedicated parking space in the depot.

=== Bee Network franchising ===
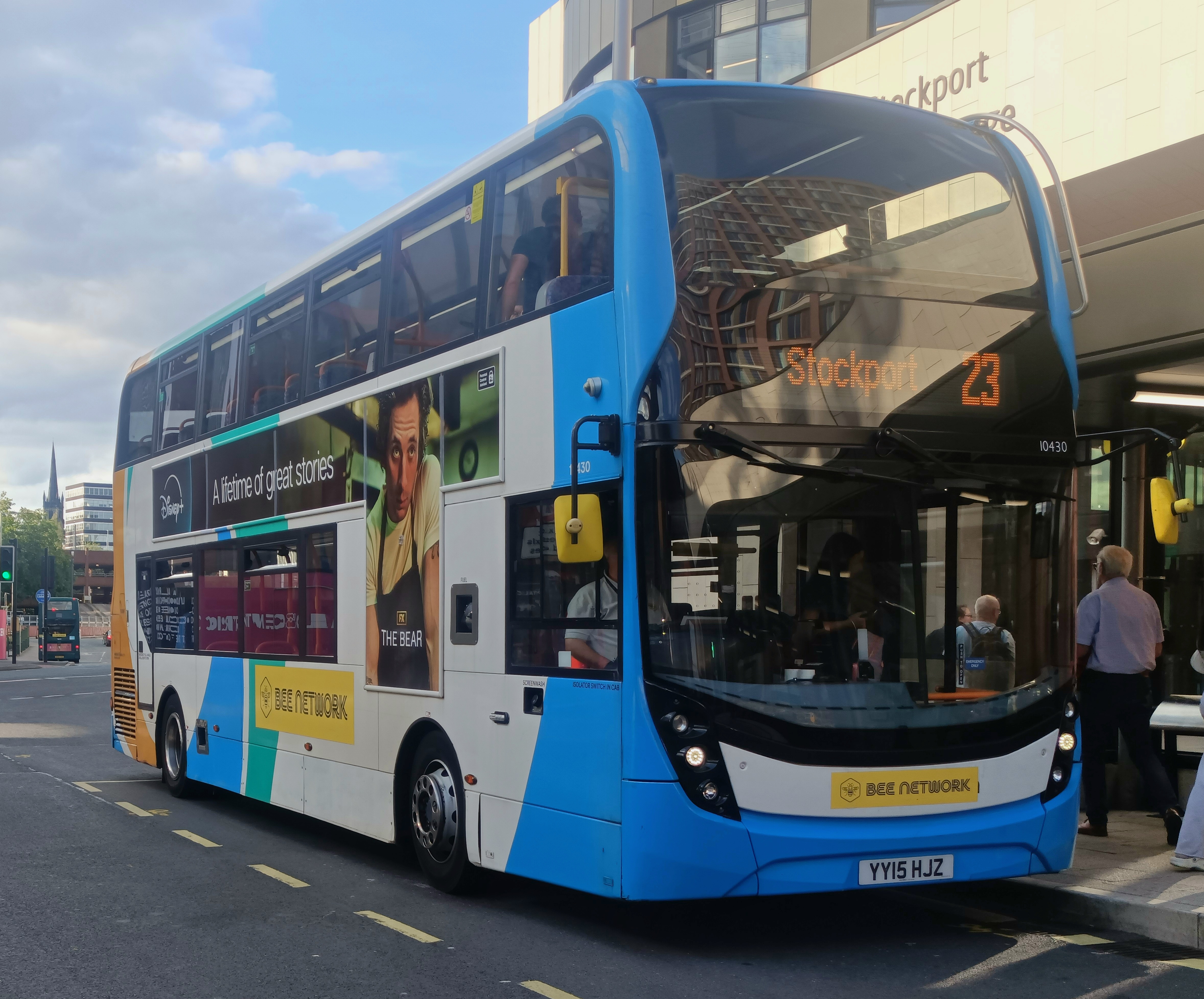
An Alexander Dennis Enviro400 MMC with temporary Bee Network stickers at Stockport Interchange, August 2025

In 2019, it was announced that the Greater Manchester Combined Authority (GMCA) were looking into improving the public transport network in Greater Manchester with bus franchising as the preferred option by both itself and TfGM, ultimately becoming part of the Bee Network integrated transport network. This announcement concerned a consortium of bus operators including Stagecoach, who as part of the OneBus group, criticised the franchising proposals as "frightening", claiming passengers would face fare increases and tax rises as a result of franchising. OneBus proposed operators could instead work with the GMCA and TfGM to make private sector investments into the local bus network.

The Stagecoach Group, alongside Rotala, launched a judicial review in March 2021 at the Royal Courts of Justice of a GMCA public consultation that recommended council leaders and Mayor of Greater Manchester, Andy Burnham, approve plans to adopt bus franchising, with both parties criticising the consultation as "unlawful" and "flawed" for having not taken into account modal shifts in transport use brought about by the COVID-19 pandemic. However, it was ruled on 9 March 2022 that the GMCA consultation bus network was lawful, with an appeal against the ruling rejected in July 2022. Tranche 1 of the Bee Network commenced on 24 September 2023, with Stagecoach not awarded any services and losing their Wigan depot and operations to Go North West, as part of the first tranche of franchised bus services.

On 23 June 2023, Stagecoach Manchester was announced to have been awarded Tranche 2 franchises from TfGM to run a total of 87 Bee Network-franchised bus services in north Manchester from 24 March 2024. These services are operated from Stagecoach's Middleton, First Greater Manchester's Oldham and Go North West's Queen's Road bus depots; the latter two and their combined 947 staff were acquired from their respective operators. Following an initial postponement, under Tranche 3 of the Bee Network rollout on 5 January 2025, Stagecoach Manchester lost its Ashton-under-Lyne, Hyde Road (Ardwick) and Sharston depots to ComfortDelGro-owned Metroline Manchester. Stagecoach managed to maintain a significantly reduced presence in south Manchester, with the awarding of the franchise for Bee Network services in Stockport.

=== Magic Bus ===
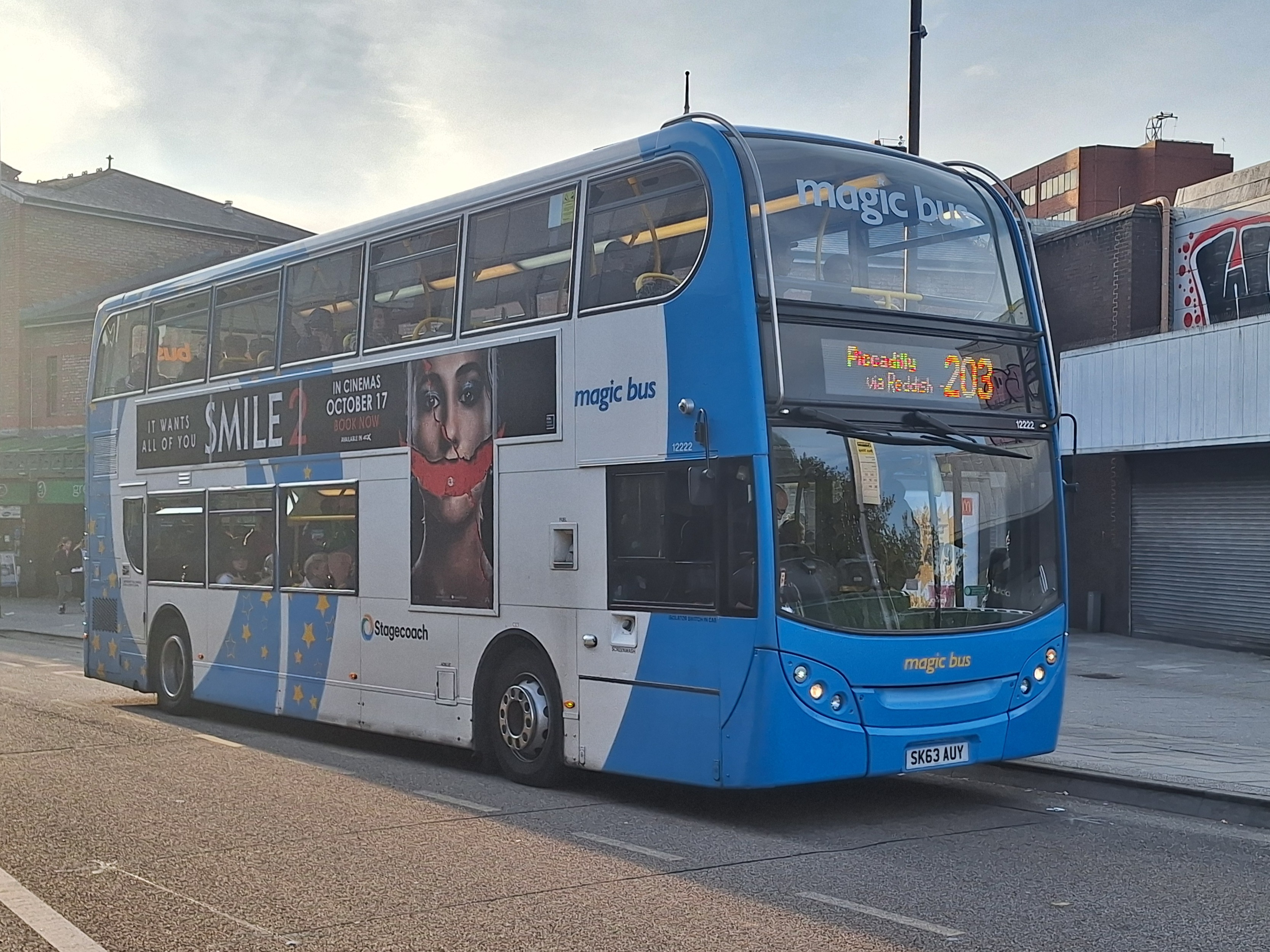
A Magic Bus-branded Alexander Dennis Enviro400H in Stockport, October 2024

The Magic Bus brand was introduced by Stagecoach Manchester to the Wilmslow Road bus corridor to compete against other operators. It offered lower fares than on regular Stagecoach services, using older bus type fleets. Prior to its withdrawal on 5 January 2025, following the transfer of Magic Bus services 142, 143 and 147 to Metroline Manchester, the fleet consisted of Alexander Dennis Enviro400Hs in a blue and white livery featuring yellow star graphics.

== Fleet and depots ==
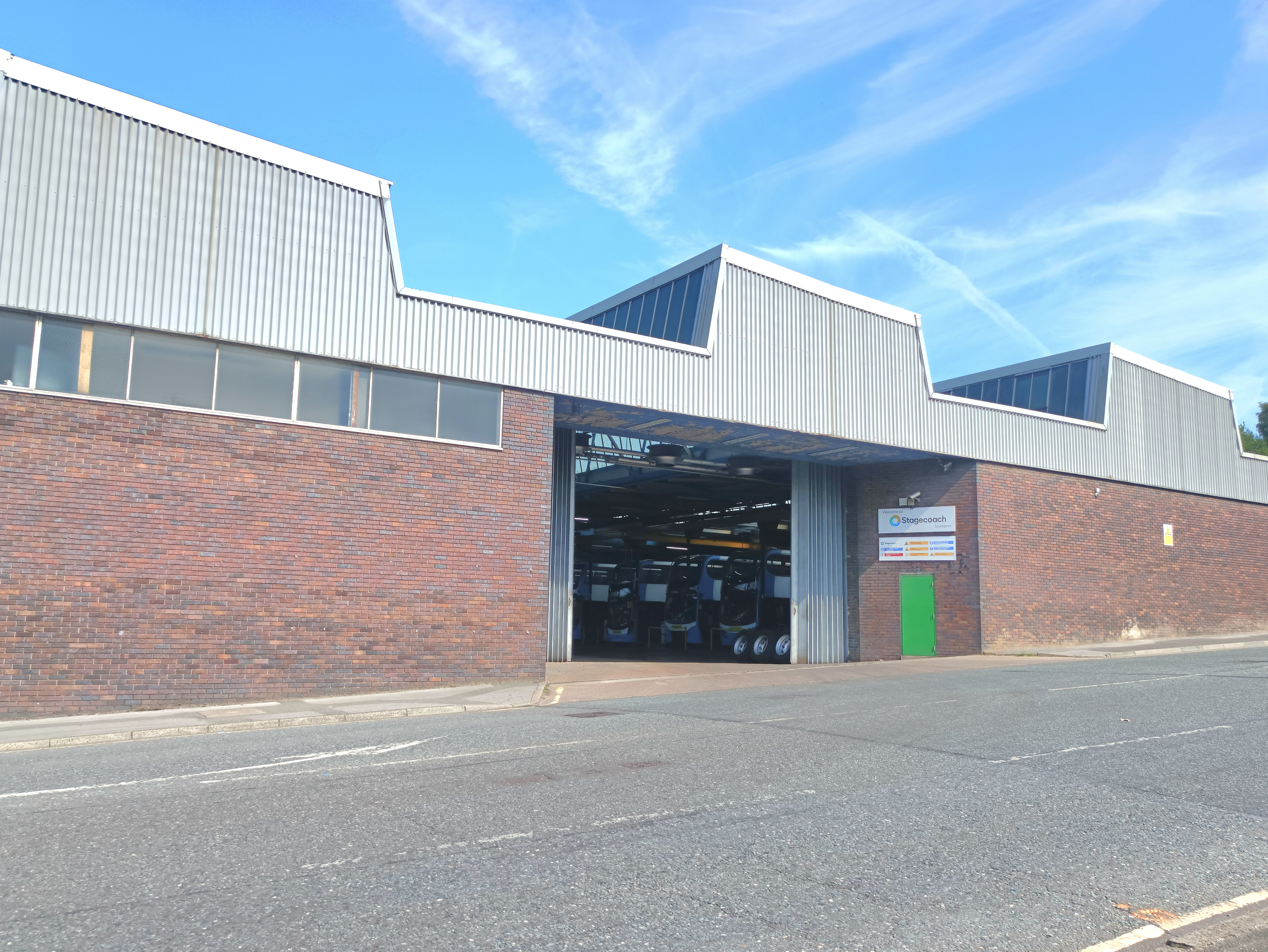
Stockport bus garage on Daw Bank, July 2025

As of June 2025, Stagecoach Manchester operates a fleet of 601 buses from five depots:

- Middleton (Greengate) - taken over from Bluebird Bus and Coach on 3 March 2014
- Manchester (Queens Road) - taken over from Go North West on 24 March 2024
- Oldham (Walshaw Street) - taken over from First Greater Manchester on 24 March 2024
- Salford (Little Hulton)
- Stockport (Daw Bank)

A new Stockport depot capable of housing around 200 battery electric buses is set to be opened by TfGM at a former Lex Autolease site in Cheadle Heath in 2029, with most of the existing Daw Bank depot due to be demolished to allow for the construction of affordable housing. While the new depot is constructed, two temporary depots on Heaton Lane and Wood Street will be used by Stagecoach Manchester from autumn 2026.

== Services ==
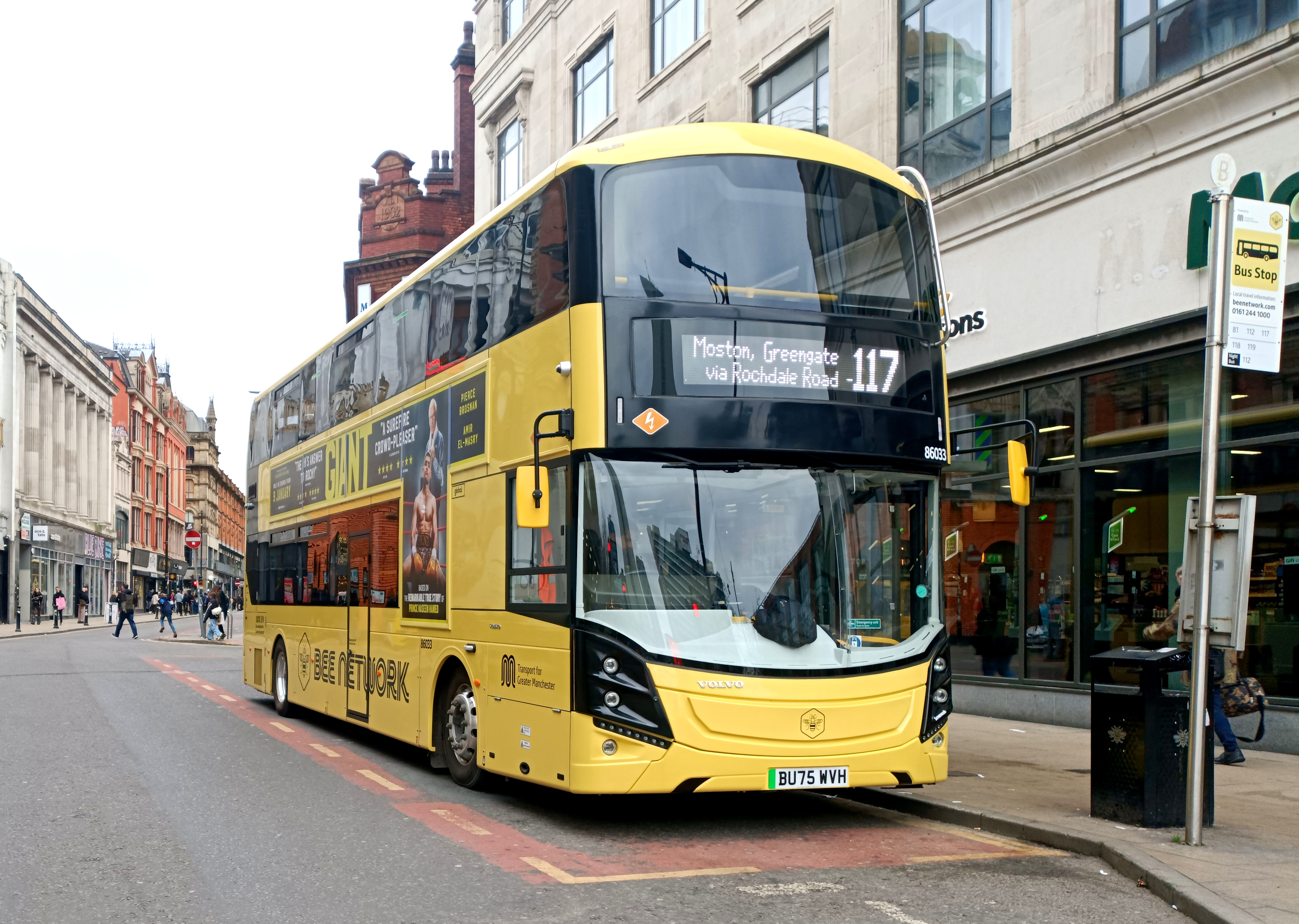
A Bee Network-branded MCV D113-bodied Volvo BZL at Piccadilly Gardens, December 2025

=== Areas served ===
Stagecoach Manchester mainly runs services in the northern areas of Greater Manchester, serving Bury, Oldham, Salford, Stockport, Trafford, Tameside and central Manchester.

As of May 2025, Stagecoach also operates four routes running into the neighbouring counties of Cheshire, Derbyshire and West Yorkshire, with two services acquired from Go North West and First West Yorkshire:

- 100 Shudehill Interchange - Warrington Interchange
- 184 Huddersfield - Marsden - Oldham
- 358 Stockport - Marple - New Mills - Hayfield
- 360 Stockport - Hazel Grove - New Mills - Hayfield.

=== Free bus ===
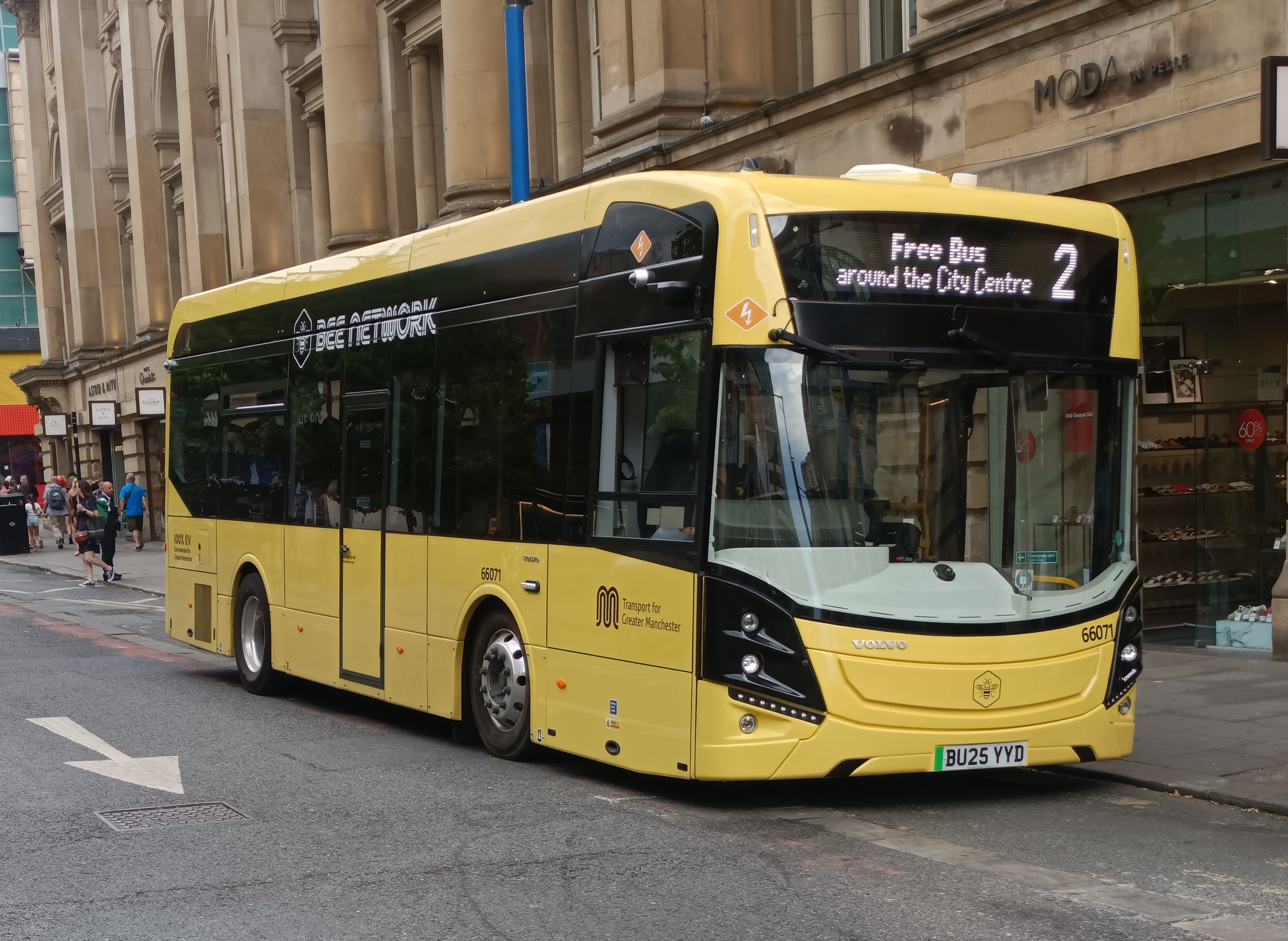
An MCV-bodied Volvo BZL battery electric bus on free bus route 2 at Manchester Arndale, August 2025

Free bus is a zero-fare bus system that operates in Manchester city centre, first introduced in 2002 by First Manchester. These services were initially acquired by Go North West, following the sale of Queens Road garage by First in 2019, with Stagecoach acquiring the services during Tranche 2 of the Bee Network rollout when it acquired Queens Road garage on 24 March 2024. The services are operated using a fleet of twelve MCV-bodied Volvo BZL battery electric buses.

Stagecoach also ran the Stockport free bus network, then branded as Metroshuttle, on behalf of Stockport Council from March 2011 until July 2012, when the service was transferred to Arriva North West's Wythenshawe depot.

=== Nightbus ===
Stagecoach Manchester currently provides night bus services on the following routes:

- 17 between Shudehill Interchange and Rochdale Interchange
- 83 between Piccadilly Gardens and Oldham bus station
- 135 between Piccadilly Gardens and Bury Interchange
- 192 between Piccadilly Gardens and Hazel Grove Park & Ride.

Prior to the rollout of the Bee Network, Stagecoach offered several night bus services in Manchester and Wigan every Friday and Saturday night. The services ran every 15–60 minutes and the routes are mainly the same as the normal routes with some exceptions. Services in Wigan also operated on New Year's Eve with additional journeys during the evening between 19:00 and 23:00, along with journeys on Arriva North West's route 352 to Orrell and 362 to Standish and on Wigan Buses/Maytree Travel route 612 to Wrightington Hospital.

== See also ==
- History of public transport authorities in Manchester
