= Bee Network =

Transport network in Greater Manchester, England

- Network logo

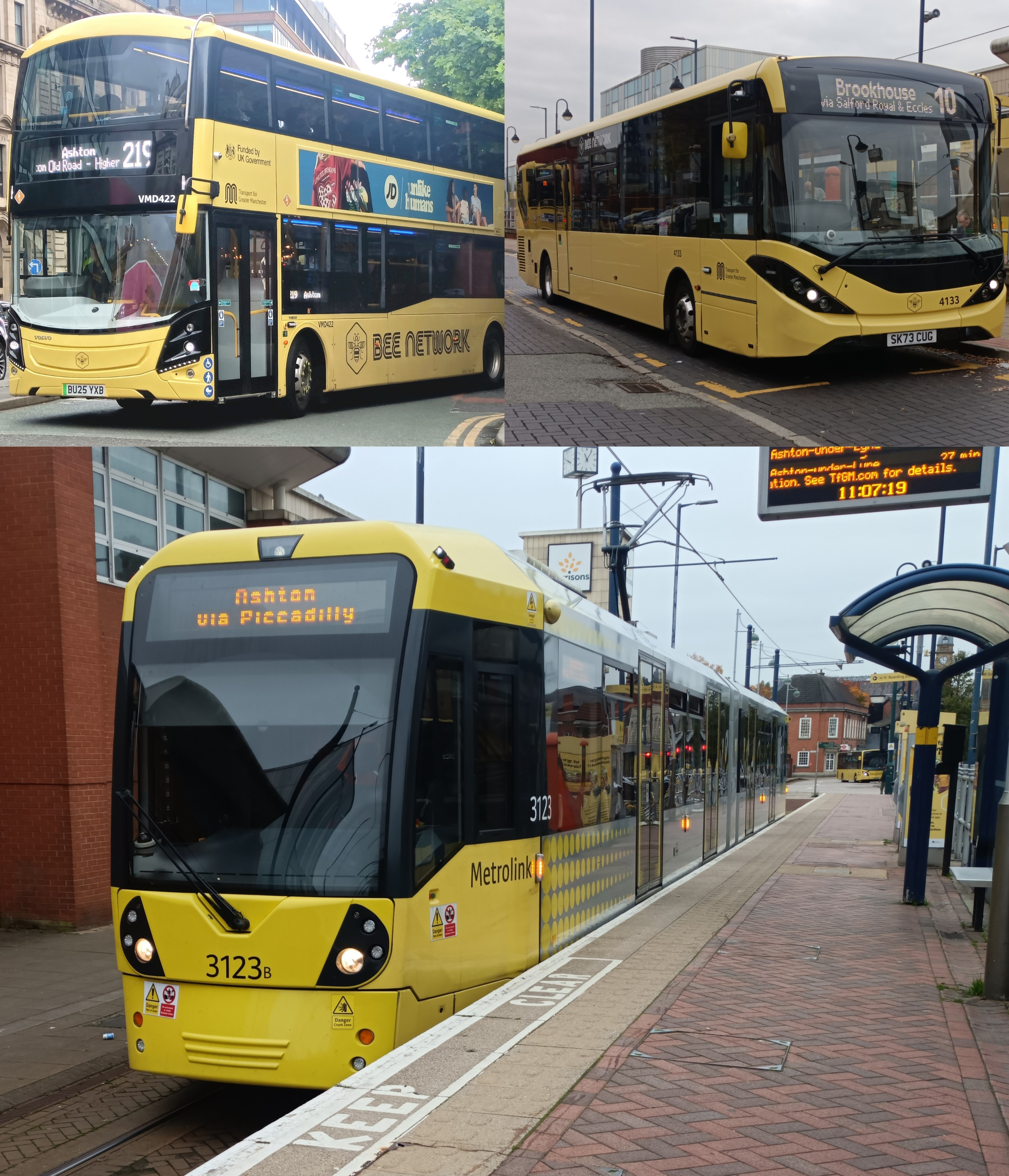
- A montage of Bee Network services, including buses (top images) and Metrolink (bottom image)

Overview
- Owner: Transport for Greater Manchester
- Area served: Greater Manchester
- Transit type: Bus; Cycling; Pedestrian; Tram; Commuter rail
- Number of stations: Bus stops: 12,000; Railway: 101; Tram: 99
- Headquarters: Manchester
- Website: tfgm.com

Operation
- Began operation: September 2023; 3 years ago
- Operators: Beryl, Diamond North West, First Manchester, Go North West, Metrolink, Metroline Manchester, Stagecoach Manchester, Vision Bus

The Bee Network is an integrated transport network in Greater Manchester, England. It comprises bus, tram, cycling and walking routes. Transport for Greater Manchester (TfGM) is expected to have commuter rail services joining the network in 2028. Initially unveiled in 2018, the project is aiming to create a London-style transport system, to encourage more people to take public transport instead of cars.

== Design ==
The design of the network is based around the worker bee, which is the most well-known symbol representing the city and region; it was adopted during the Industrial Revolution. The facilities supporting the network also follow this design, similar to the adoption of London Red across almost all public transport services, following the nationalisation of the London General Omnibus Company in 1933.

== History ==
Chris Boardman, the Greater Manchester cycling and walking commissioner, published documents in 2017 setting out plans. The project would include 75 miles (121 km) of segregated cycling lanes, brand new electric buses, around 1,800 miles (2,900 km) of new dedicated walking and cycling routes, 2,400 new road crossings and a new cycle hire scheme throughout the region.

Following on from the Greater Manchester Combined Authority's decision to bring in a bus franchising scheme under the Bus Services Act 2017 in March 2021, the Bee Network concept was expanded to cover all forms of public transport – tram, bus and commuter rail – as well as active travel. The active travel component of the network was rebranded as the Bee Active Network.

A cycle hire scheme was launched in late 2021, using Beryl bikes.

In June 2022, then Mayor of Greater Manchester Andy Burnham announced capped fares for buses from September 2022, in order to help with cost-of-living rises. The new fares would see full day fares capped at £5 and single trips capped at £2. (Note: The announcement of a £2 single bus journey fare cap in Greater Manchester inspired the creation of a national scheme by the Department for Transport, where all bus fares are subsidised to a maximum of £2 from 1 January 2023 in England only.)

The Bee Network's bus service rollout began from December 2022, with the awarding of two large franchises and seven small franchises to Go North West and Diamond North West respectively in Bolton, Wigan and parts of Bury and Salford. This displaced the existing operations of Arriva North West, First Greater Manchester, Stagecoach Manchester and Vision Bus in the Tranche One area.

Following an agreement between transport officials and credit unions in November 2024, a new annual bus ticket was introduced, with effect from 5 January 2025, upon the full implementation of Bee Network bus franchising, along with a £2 "hopper fee"; this was followed by contactless fare caps in March 2025.

In March 2026, it was announced that additional night bus services would run to every borough in Greater Manchester, and additional buses would run to key employment hubs. This was to support the rapid growth in ridership of 14% over a year.

== Cycling ==
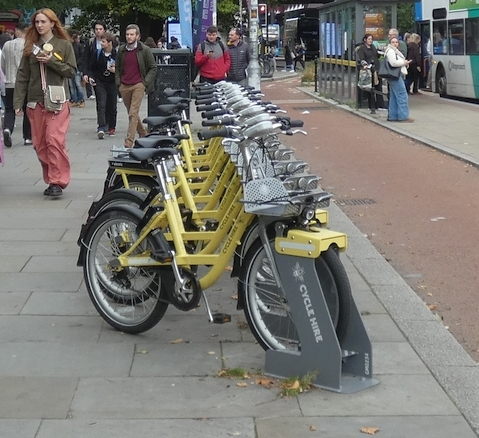
Bee Network "Bee Bikes" Beryl hire cycles on Oxford Road in Manchester

One of the major policies of the Bee Network is making it easy, safe and attractive for people to travel on foot or by bike for everyday trips. A large focus is being put on to cycling in this project, therefore TfGM are investing money in many things that encourage cycling in combination with local authorities such as cycling infrastructure, cycle hire scheme, cycle hubs and many courses to help people learn to ride a bike.

The Bee Network includes the UK's largest cycling and walking network; Active Neighbourhoods also form part of the Bee Network. The network includes a hire cycle scheme sponsored by Beryl. The bikes are nicknamed "Bee Bikes" after the worker bee or "Burnham Bikes" after the then Greater Manchester mayor Andy Burnham.

As a result of investment in cycling infrastructure, the City of Manchester was named as the first ACES European Capital of Cycling for 2024, following a bid submitted by Manchester City Council in September 2023.

== Bus franchising ==
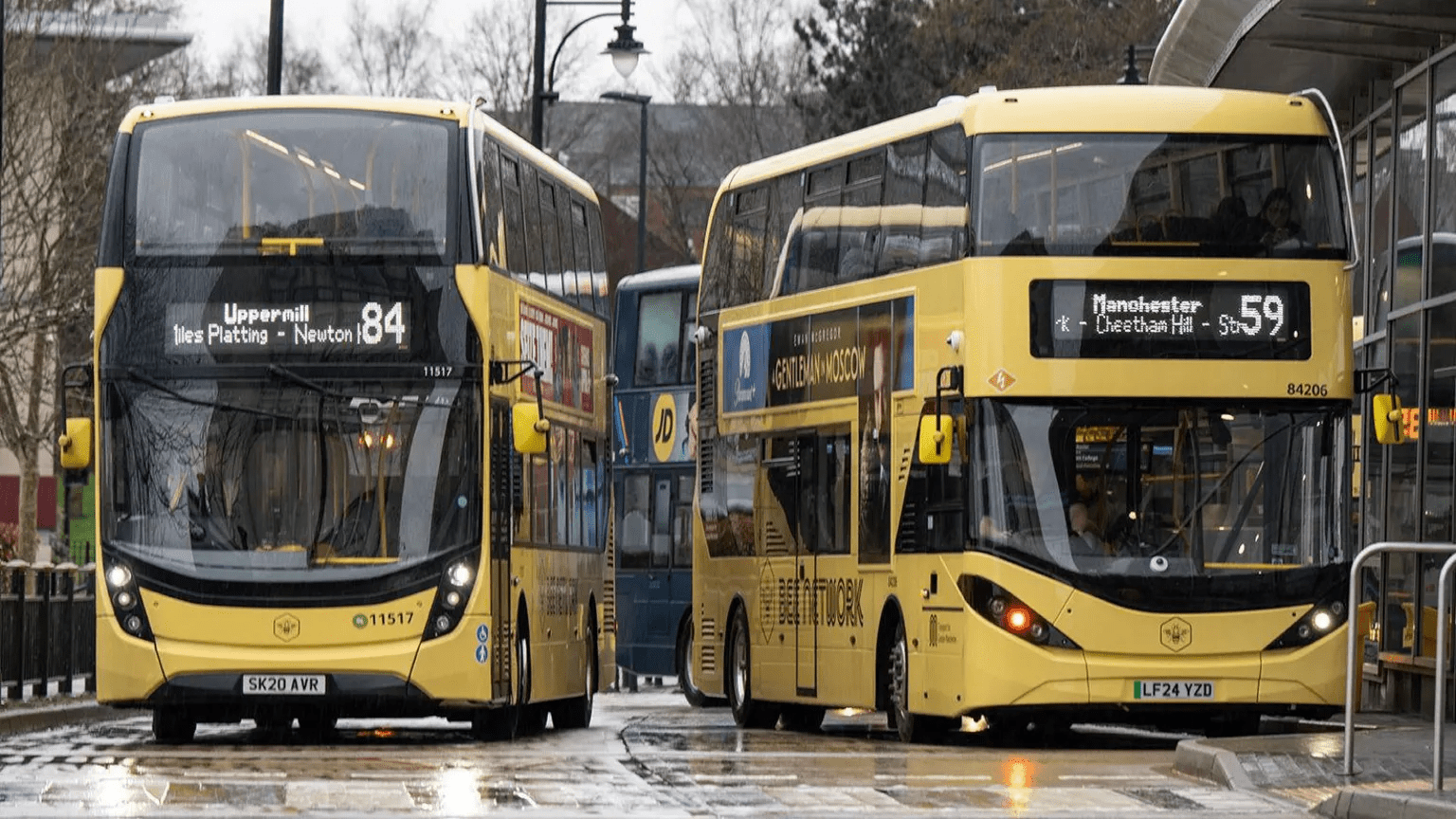
Bee Network buses operated by Stagecoach Manchester at Oldham bus station

Between 1986 and 2025, the bus network in Greater Manchester was deregulated, with local control of services having been removed as a consequence of the Transport Act 1985. However, following the enactment of the Bus Services Act 2017, mayoral combined authorities like the Greater Manchester Combined Authority have had the power to bring buses back under the control of local government by means of a franchising scheme. The GMCA was the first combined authority to use the powers under the Act, and re-regulated its system in three tranches, starting on 24 September 2023 and completing on 5 January 2025.

=== Tranche 1 ===
Bolton and Wigan, with parts of Bury and Salford, were the first areas to be brought under the new franchising scheme from 24 September 2023. Diamond North West and Go North West were awarded contracts to operate services in this area.

=== Tranche 2 ===
The franchised area expanded to Oldham, Rochdale, the rest of Bury, further parts of Salford and north Manchester on 24 March 2024. Diamond North West, First Greater Manchester and Stagecoach Manchester were awarded contracts to operate services in this area.

=== Tranche 3 ===
The remaining parts of Greater Manchester (Stockport, Tameside, Trafford, and the rest of Manchester and Salford) joined the scheme on 5 January 2025. Metroline Manchester, Stagecoach Manchester, Go North West and Diamond North West have been awarded contracts to operate services in this area.

=== Vehicles ===
The first batch of 50 BYD Alexander Dennis Enviro400EV battery electric buses were rolled out across the boroughs of Bolton, Wigan, and parts of Bury and Salford on 24 September 2023. These buses were allocated to the Bolton garage of Go North West. The fleet was expanded with the second batch of 50 Enviro400EV buses in the boroughs of Oldham, Rochdale and the remainder of Bury on 24 March 2024, for Stagecoach Manchester's Oldham garage, as well as with 67 Alexander Dennis Enviro200 MMCs ordered by Diamond North West for its Bolton and Eccles garages for use on Leigh and Wigan services.

== Railways ==
Network Rail and Transport for Greater Manchester (TfGM) signed a collaboration agreement in August 2023 to deliver upgrades and regeneration opportunities across Manchester and Salford’s central railway stations. As part of the integration of local railway services into the Bee Network, the first contactless payment on rail outside London is to be trialled on the Stalybridge to Victoria and Glossop to Piccadilly lines by early 2025. This will be followed by other lines, with a multi-modal fare cap introduced by 2030.

The stations between Manchester Piccadilly, Glossop, and Hadfield are to join the network in December 2026.

Commuter rail was expected to fully join the Bee Network by 2030 at the latest, creating a service similar to the London Overground; however, in March 2024, the mayor of Greater Manchester announced that the date for commuter rail to join the Bee Network is intended to be brought forward from 2030 to 2028. He also announced the first eight routes planned to join the Bee Network:

- Alderley Edge – Manchester Piccadilly
- Buxton – Manchester Piccadilly
- Glossop/Hadfield – Manchester Piccadilly
- Manchester Airport stopping services
- Rochdale stopping services
- Rose Hill Marple – Manchester Piccadilly
- Stalybridge – Southport
- Wigan Wallgate – Manchester Victoria.

In addition, a new station due to be opened at Golborne in the mid-2020s will also be part of the Bee Network.

== See also ==
- Free buses in Greater Manchester
- List of railway stations in Greater Manchester
