= Manchester Community Transport =

Defunct bus operator

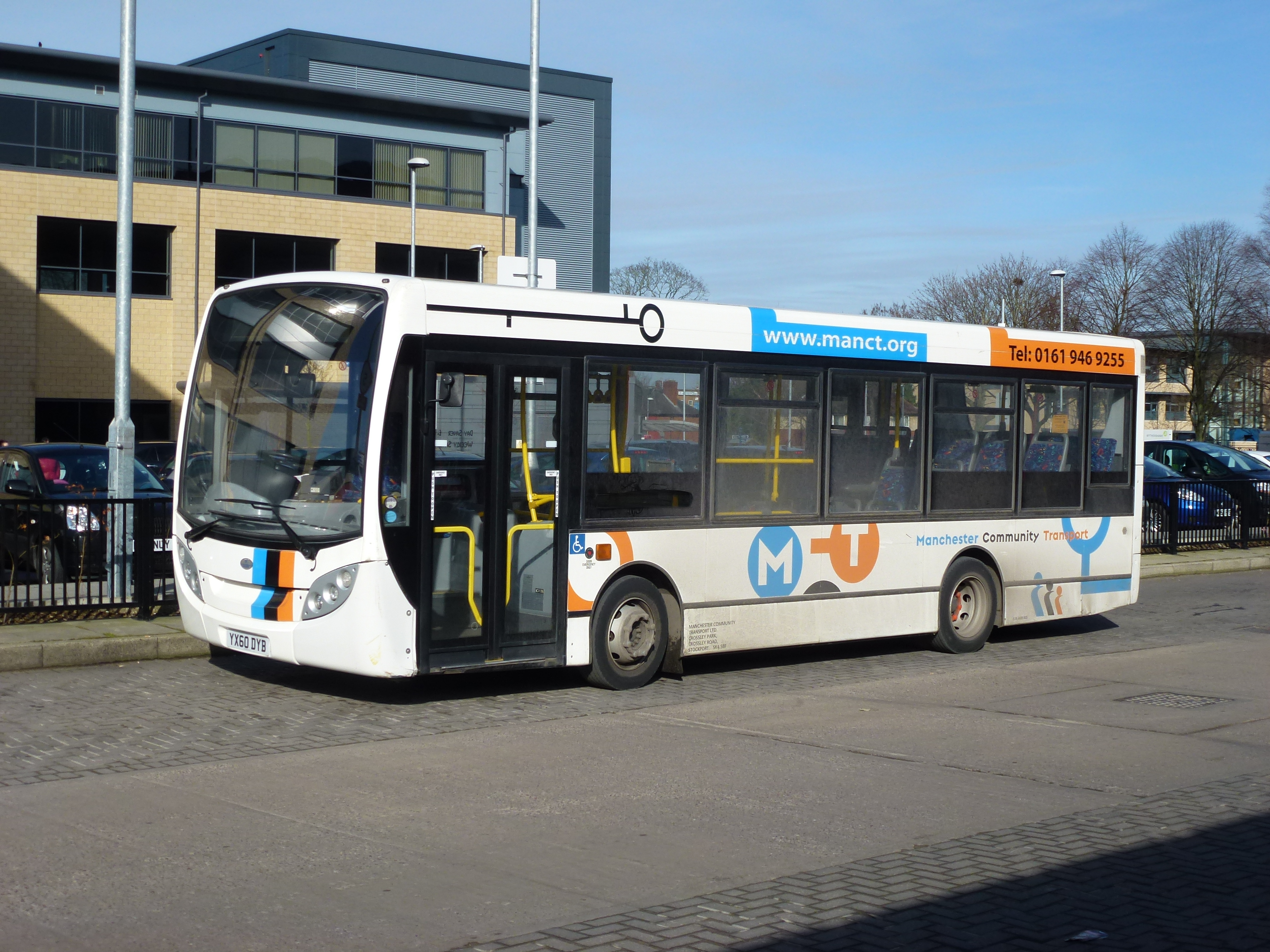
- Alexander Dennis Enviro200 at Wythenshawe bus station in 2013
- Parent: HCT Group
- Founded: 1980
- Ceased operation: April 2020
- Headquarters: Oldham
- Service area: Greater Manchester
- Service type: Bus services
- Routes: 38 (April 2016)
- Destinations: Altrincham, Ashton-under-Lyne, Bolton, Manchester, Middleton, Rochdale, Stockport, Wythenshawe
- Fleet: 67
- Website: www.manct.org

Manchester Community Transport was a bus operator in Greater Manchester, based in Oldham.

== History ==
Manchester Community Transport was established as Wythenshawe Mobile in 1980, under the Urban Aid Funding scheme. In 2005 it was rebranded Manchester Community Transport. The company provided community bus services across the Manchester area as well as Transport for Greater Manchester contracted bus services.

On 1 March 2013, Manchester Community Transport acquired Maytree Travel. However, on 4 April 2013, Maytree Travel ceased trading with services suspended.

On 7 April 2013, Manchester Community Transport commenced operating additional services under contract to Transport for Greater Manchester. As at April 2016, it operated services on 38 routes,

In 2018, MCT was acquired by the HCT Group.

MCT ceased operations in April 2020. Many of its services were taken over by Diamond North West, Go North West, First Manchester, Stagecoach Manchester, Go Goodwins, Stotts Tours and Nexus Move
