= Oldham bus station =

Bus station in Greater Manchester, England

Oldham
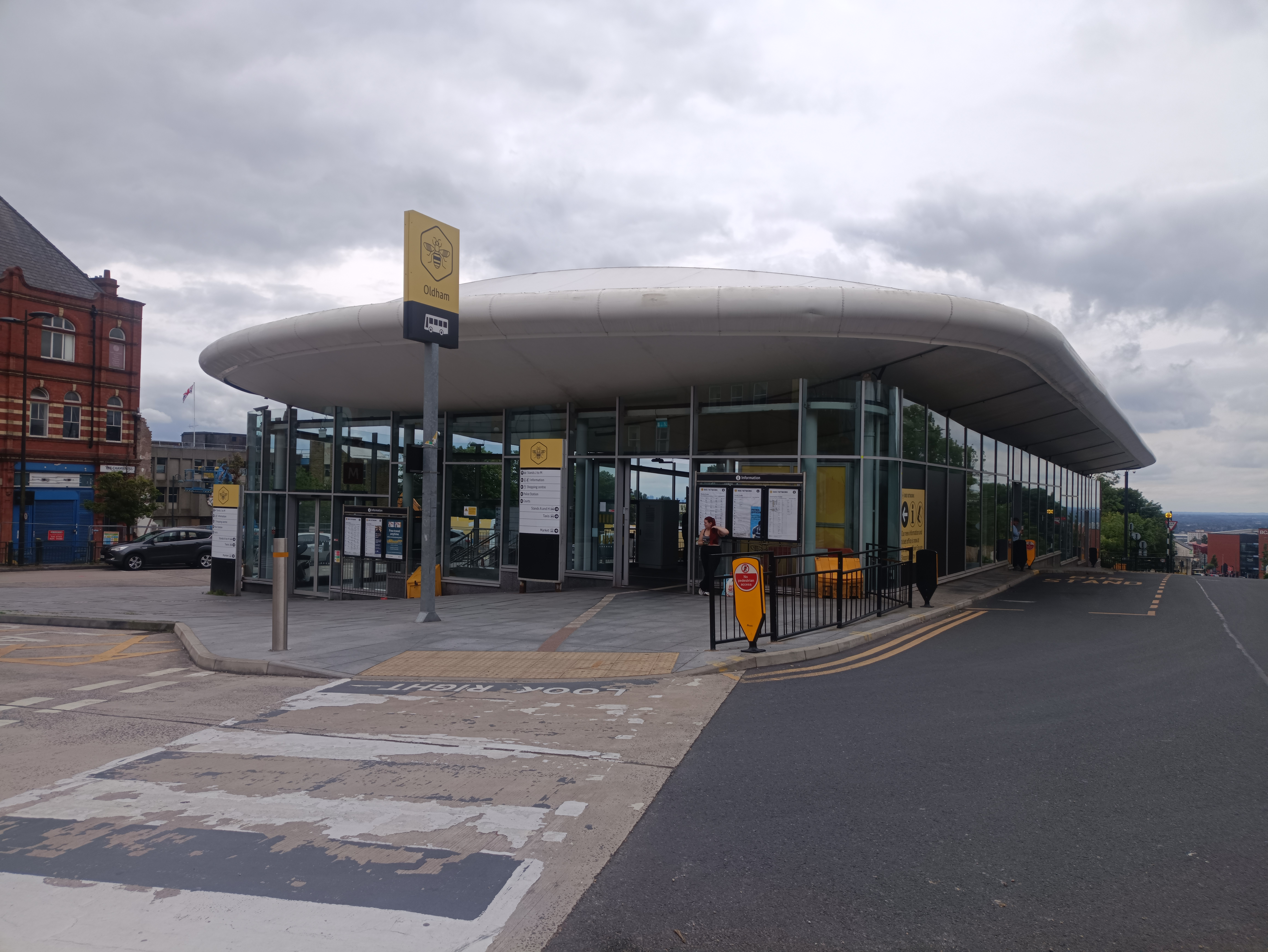
- Oldham West Street bus station, 2026

General information
- Location: Cheapside / West Street, Oldham; Metropolitan Borough of Oldham; England
- Coordinates: 53.5431°N 2.1162°W
- Operator: Transport for Greater Manchester
- Bus routes: 57 59 76 76A 81 82 83 84 149 159 180 183 184 343 350 356 403 409 411 415 426 540
- Bus stands: 13 (Arrivals, A-M except I)
- Bus operators: Diamond Bus North West; First Manchester; Go North West; Stagecoach Manchester
- Connections: No

Other information
- Website: https://tfgm.com/travel-updates/live-departures/bus/oldham-bus

History
- Opened: 2001 (Cheapside), 2006 (West Street)
Location

Oldham bus station serves the town of Oldham, in Greater Manchester, England. It is sited on Cheapside, at the junction of West Street, and was opened in January 2001 replacing its predecessor at Town Square and the bus stops on Cheapside and West Street. The bus station is operated by Transport for Greater Manchester (TfGM).

== History ==
There were three termini in Oldham:

- West Street - services arriving from western areas
- Town Square - services arriving from eastern areas
- Mumps Bridge - for First Greater Manchester (formerly GM Buses North) services, as the depot is located here.

When the bus station opened, all services terminating in the town (Note: With the exception of some First services which terminate at Mumps Bridge.) would terminate at the new bus station.

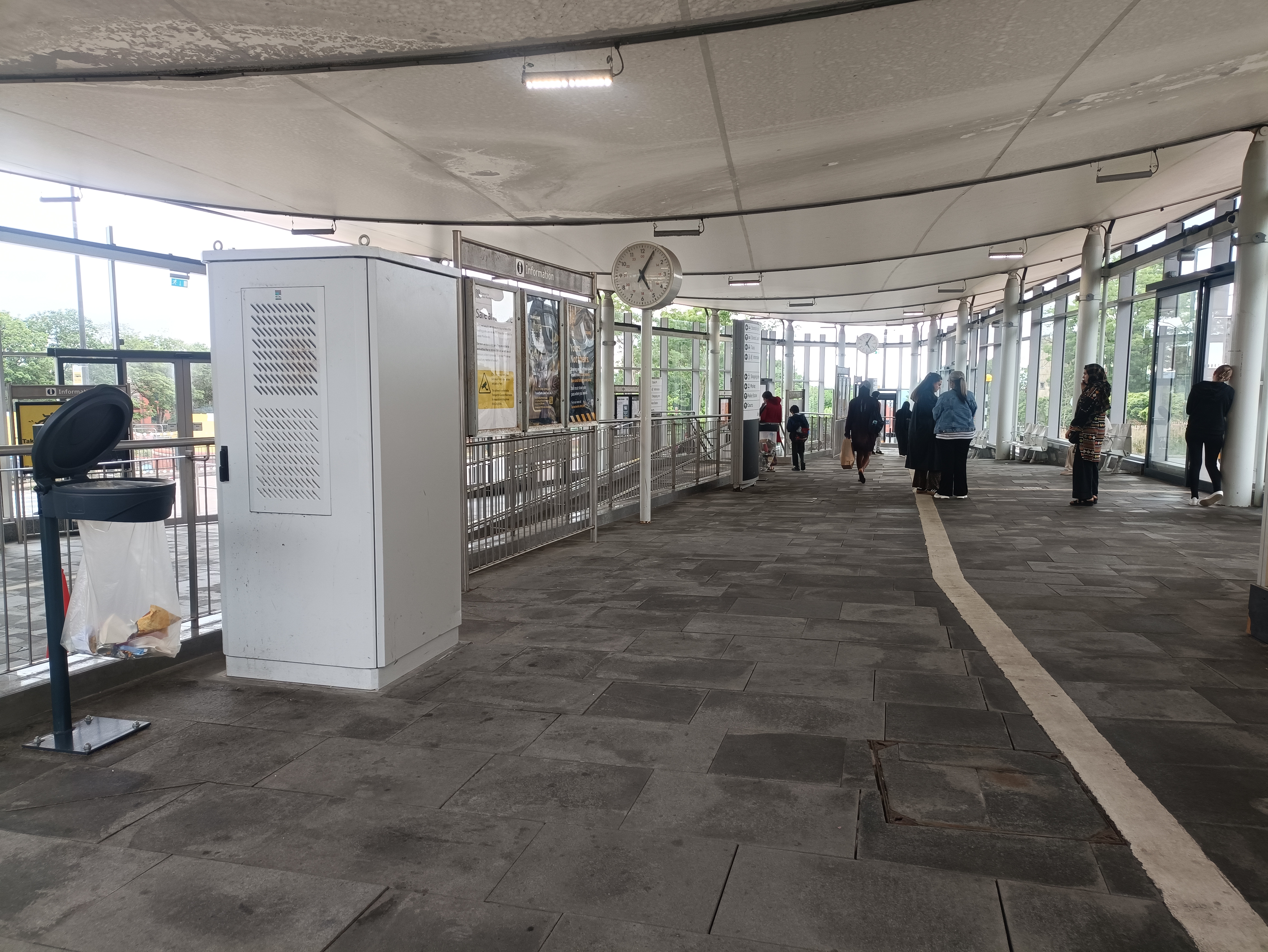
Interior of West Street bus station, 2026

The new station opened in January 2001; it won two awards within the first two years of opening.

Originally, there were eight stands, A to H. Due to the number of buses arriving in Oldham every hour, plus National Express coach services, it was decided that some services would use bus stops around the corner on West Street. After complaints from passengers of suffering from the elements, GMPTE decided to build a smaller bus station, based on the one on Cheapside for West Street. This was opened in September 2006 at a cost of £2.2m. There are now 12 stands, from A-M, excluding I.

== Services ==
The majority of bus services are operated by Stagecoach Manchester, with other services by Metroline Manchester, Diamond North West and Go North West, all of which operate under contract to the Bee Network.

There are frequent buses running to a large number of surrounding areas of Oldham and Greater Manchester, including Manchester, Middleton, Rochdale, Saddleworth and Tameside, with one local bus service running out of the region into Huddersfield, in West Yorkshire. National Express serves the bus station twice per day on its 540 route between London and Burnley.

== Safety concerns ==
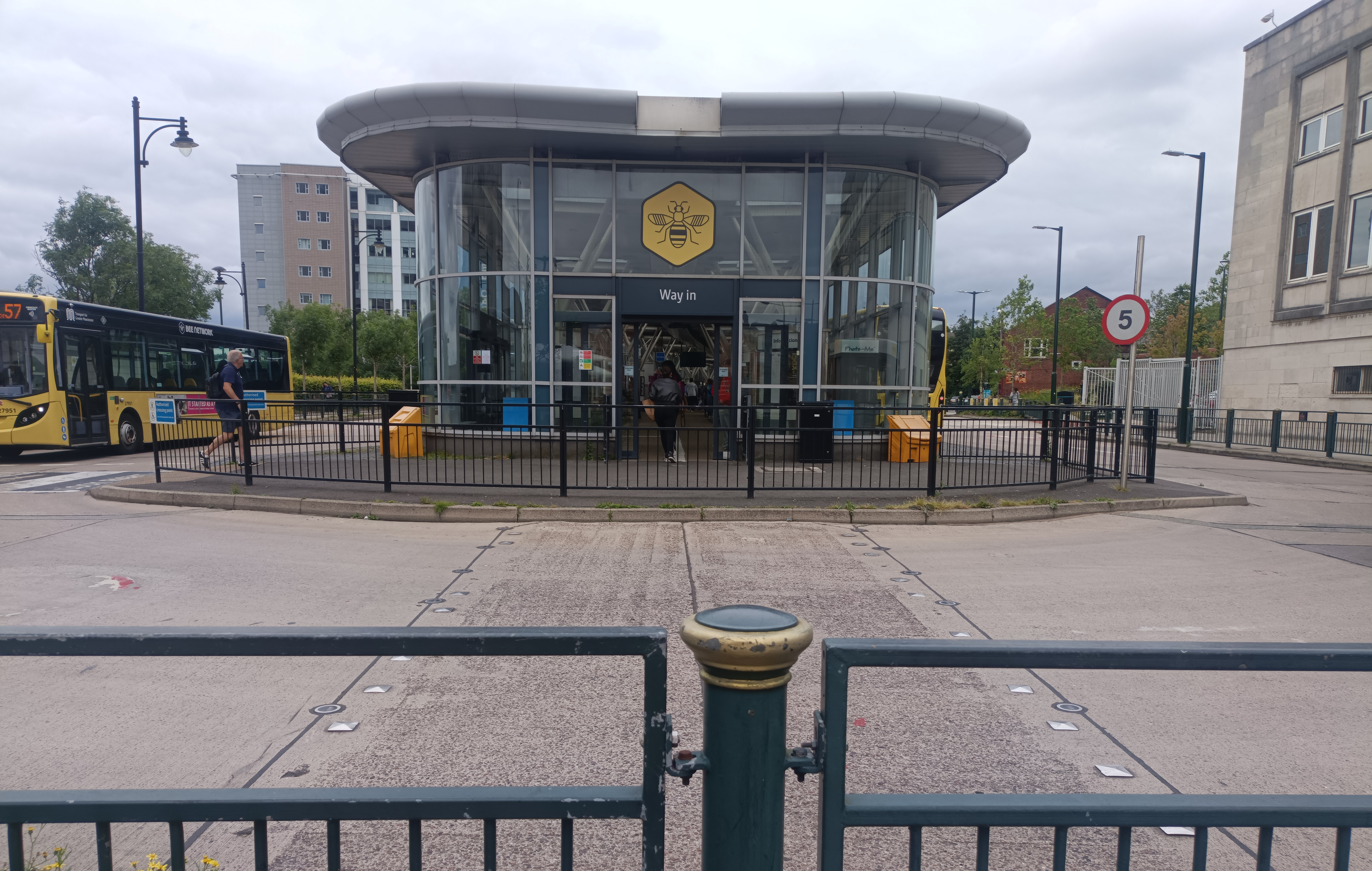
A former crossing point at the Cheapside bus station, closed due to safety concerns

One problem with the bus station is the safety of the zebra crossings. In January 2007, 56-year-old Ann Kerridge was killed after being knocked down by a First Manchester single-decker bus while using a crossing, Following another accident at the same crossing in September 2007 and a report by GMPTE obtained by the Oldham Evening Chronicle newspaper, showing potentially fatal flaws at the two crossings at the ends of the bus station: one being near the entrance to the Travelshop and the other near the junction of St Mary's Way. It stated that it had led to the family of Ann Kerridge to demand that the crossing should be closed.

The issue is that bus drivers approach the crossing on a 90 degree bend, which would restrict the view of both the driver and the pedestrian, sometimes approaching the crossing slightly too fast. Some drivers have also been known to have stopped at the junction, waiting to turn right out of the bus station, blocking the crossing, making it harder and more dangerous for pedestrians to cross over. Following the report from the Greater Manchester Passenger Transport Executive, the pedestrian crossings were reallocated to the sides of the bus station next to stands G and H; however, calls are still being made for them to be removed altogether. Zebra crossings were placed near to the bus station in September 2023 and the original pedestrian crossings were removed.
