= Maytree Travel =

British bus operating company

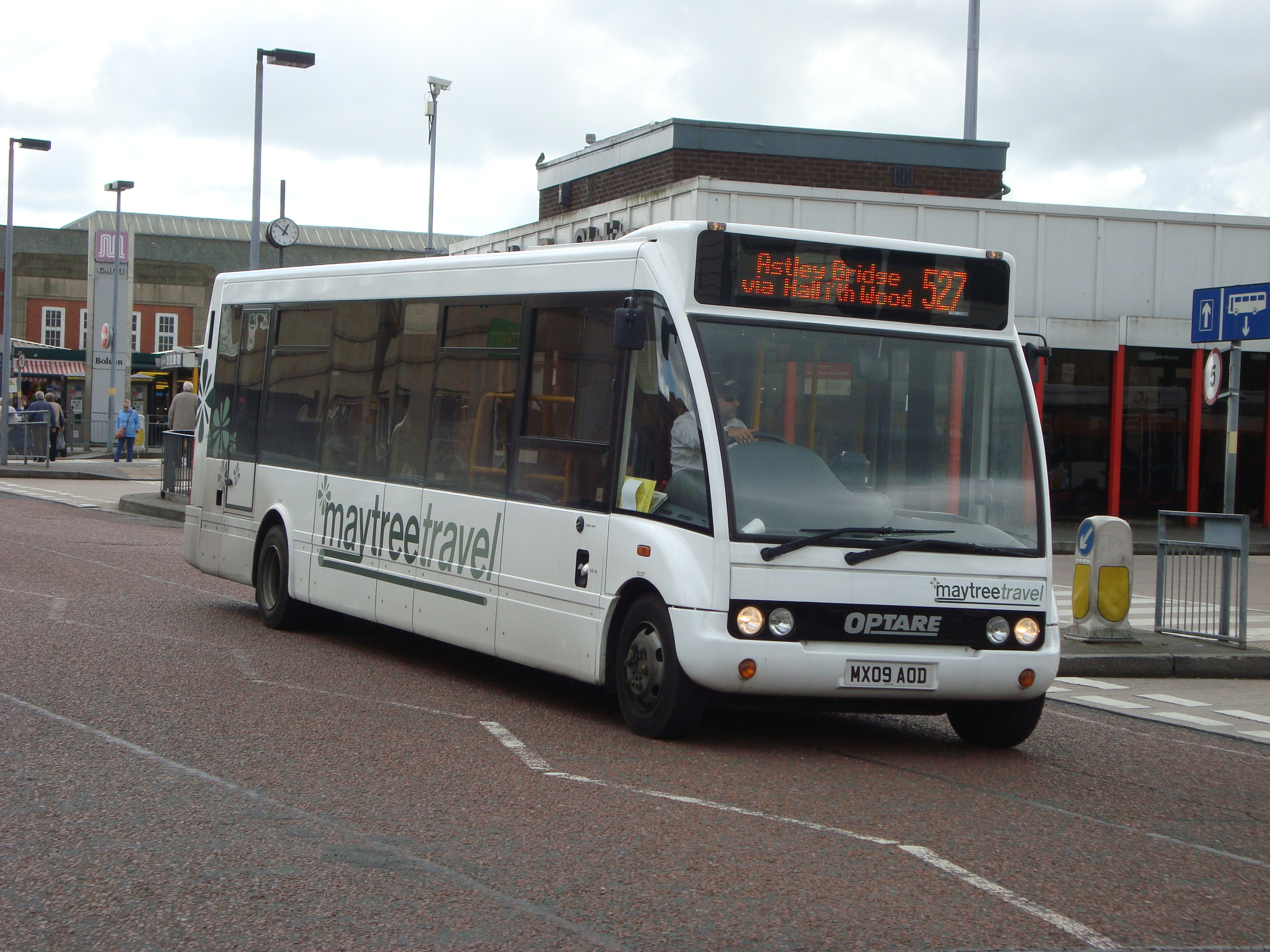
- Optare Solo in Bolton in 2009
- Parent: Manchester Community Transport
- Founded: 2008
- Defunct: 4 April 2013
- Headquarters: Smethurst Lane, Bolton, BL4 0DB
- Service area: Greater Manchester
- Service type: bus service
- Destinations: Bolton, Leigh, Wigan, Salford
- Hubs: Bolton
- Website: maytreetravel.co.uk

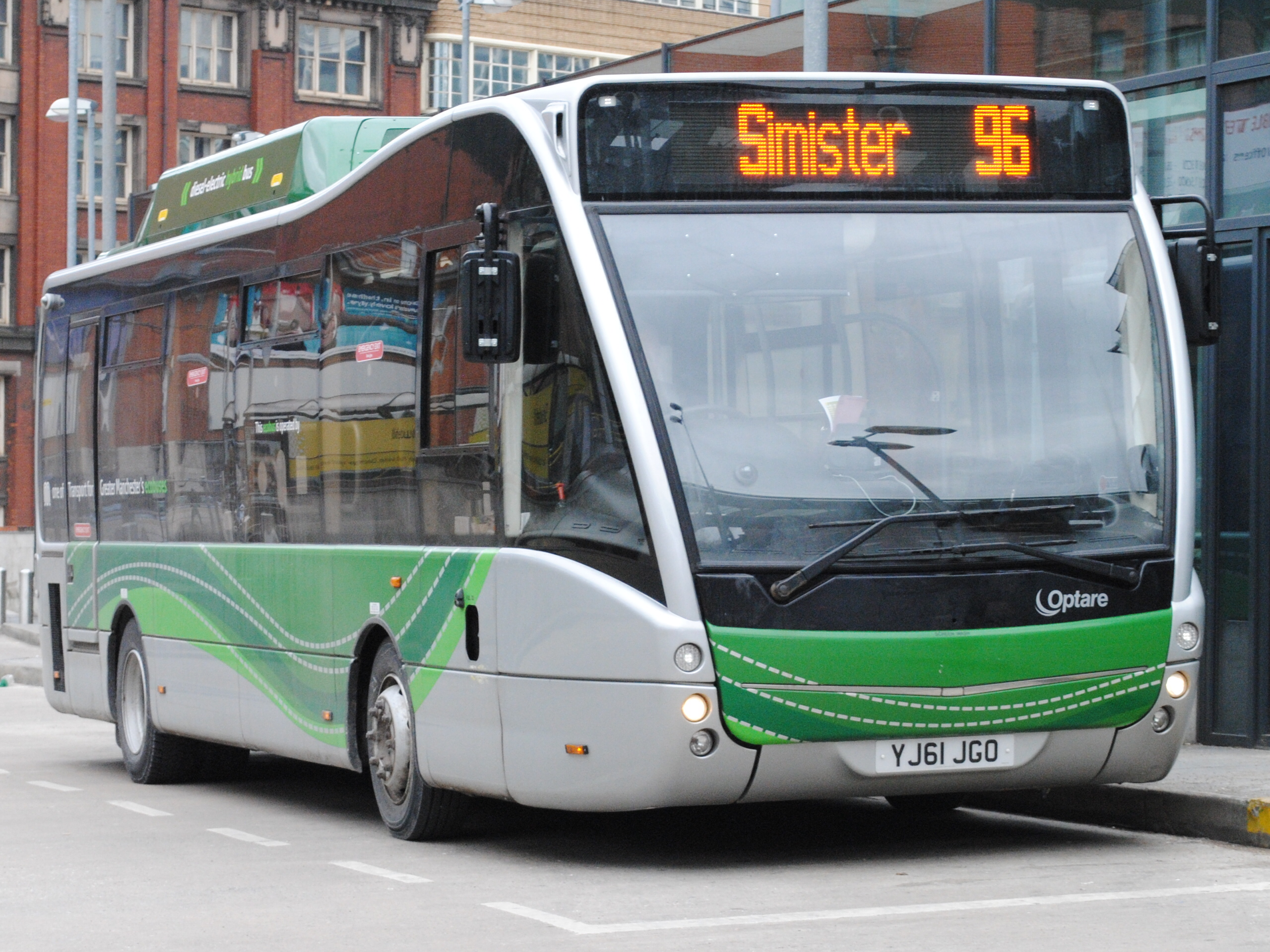
Optare Versa Hybrid in March 2013.

Maytree Travel was a bus operator based in Bolton in Greater Manchester.

== History ==
The company was formed in 2008 by owner Gary Hawthorne, who took over the Bolton operations of Tyrer Bus, who first started operating in Bolton in 2007. The company had over 35 routes and ran in the Bolton and Wigan areas. Several of its services were run on behalf of Transport for Greater Manchester, including Bolton's Metroshuttle service, which Maytree ran from January 2010 until December 2012.

On 1 March 2013, Manchester Community Transport acquired Maytree for an undisclosed figure, with Maytree becoming a trading subsidy of MCT.

Despite the takeover, Maytree Travel services were suspended on 4 April 2013 with replacements for tendered services obtained by Transport for Greater Manchester.

== See also ==
- List of bus operators of the United Kingdom
