= Mellor Strata =

Minibus bodywork on Mercedes-Benz chassis

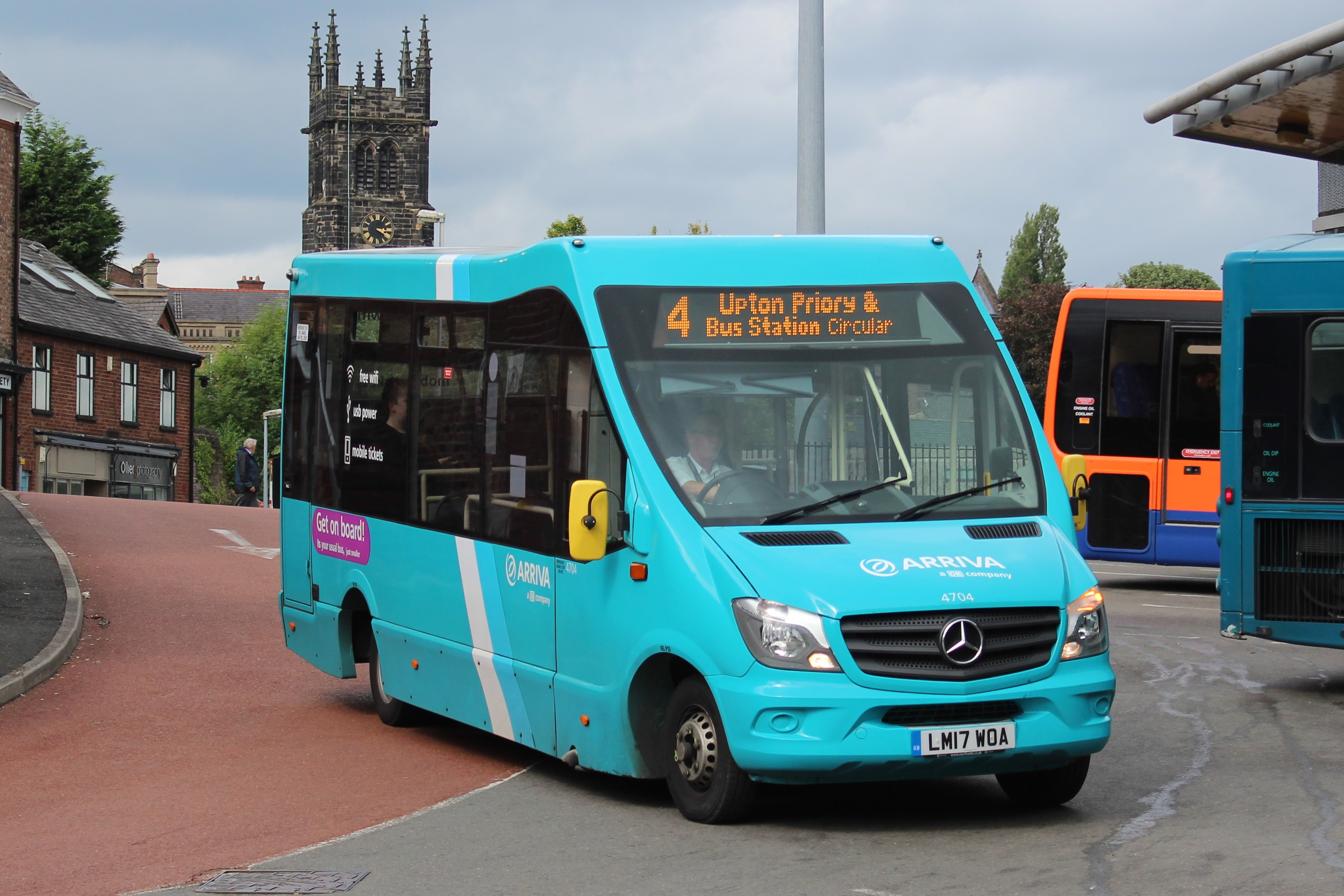
- Arriva North West Mellor Strata LF in Macclesfield in August 2018

Overview
- Manufacturer: Mellor Coachcraft
- Production: 2016–Present
- Assembly: Rochdale, Greater Manchester, England

Body and chassis
- Doors: 1
- Floor type: Strata LF; Low-floor; Strata HF 16; Step entrance
- Chassis: Mercedes-Benz Sprinter

Powertrain
- Engine: Mercedes-Benz
- Power output: 514 CDI; 140 brake horsepower (100 kW); 516 CDI; 163 brake horsepower (122 kW)
- Transmission: 7-speed automatic or manual

Dimensions
- Length: 7.76–8.78 metres (25.5–28.8 ft)
- Width: 2.3 metres (7 ft 7 in)
- Height: Strata LF; 2.67 metres (8 ft 9 in); Strata HF 16; 2.76 metres (9 ft 1 in)
- Curb weight: 5,500 kilograms (12,100 lb)

Chronology
- Predecessor: Various unnamed Mellor designs

The Mellor Strata is a minibus body manufactured by Mellor Coachcraft since 2016 on Mercedes-Benz Sprinter chassis. It is available as the Mellor Strata LF, a low-floor variant targeting the service bus market, with a capacity of up to 21 seated passengers, or as the Mellor Strata HF 16, a step-entrance version aimed at the access bus market, so named for its maximum seated passenger capacity of sixteen.

== Design ==
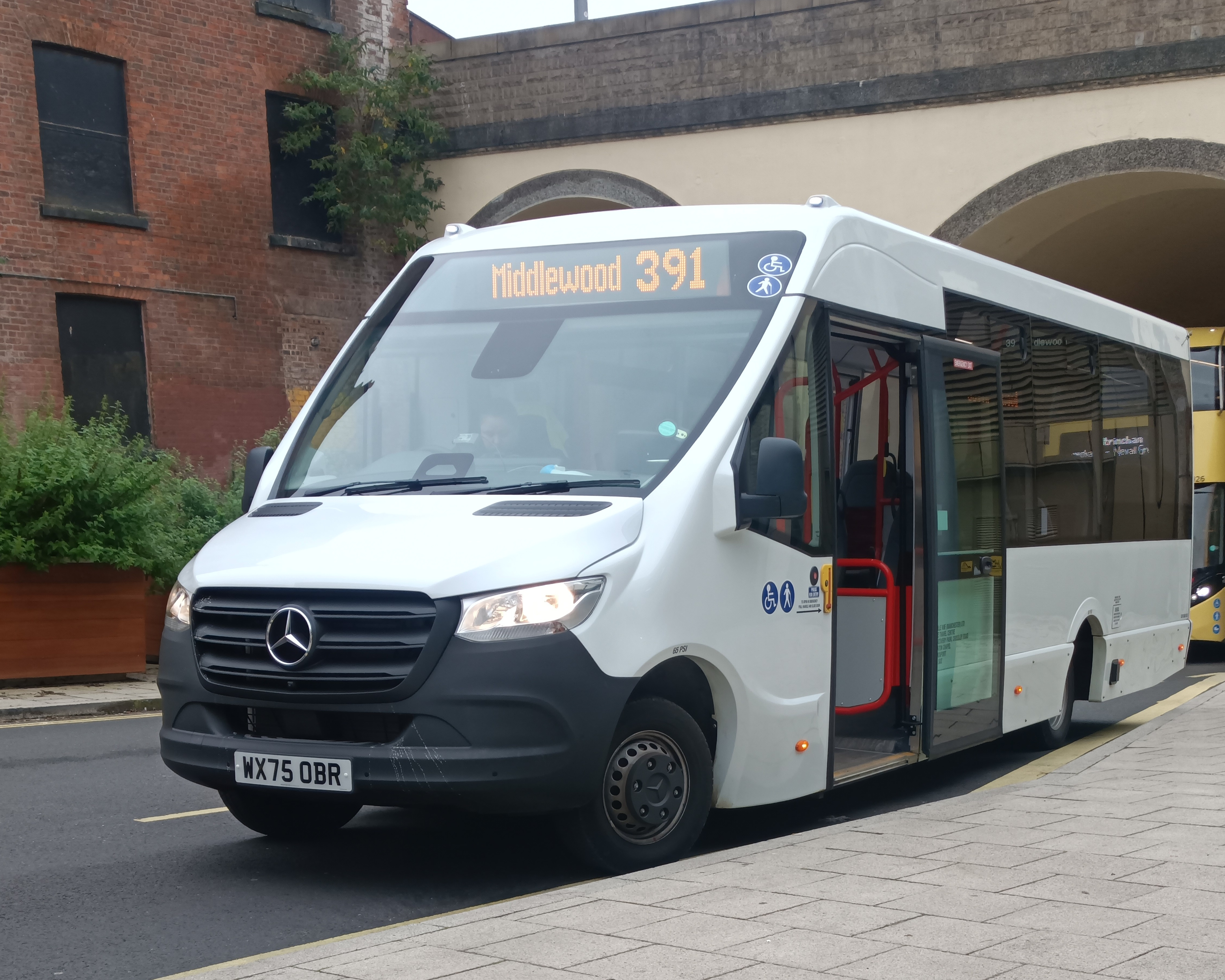
Belle Vue Coaches second-generation Mellor Strata at Stockport Interchange in October 2025

The van-derived Strata minibus was launched in 2016 to compete with the short wheelbase Alexander Dennis Enviro200 MMC and Optare Solo SR, as well as other van-derived minibus designs. The standard low-floor Strata LF, built on the long-wheelbase Mercedes-Benz Sprinter 516 CDI chassis and marketed for local bus operations, has a seating capacity of up to 21 passenger and as a result of its wide body and the relocation of the Sprinter's propshaft below the low-floor area, had additional capacity for two wheelchairs. Other features of the Strata include a one-piece sliding entrance door, destination displays integrated into the windows and a fold-out wheelchair ramp, as well as options for three-point seatbelts and differing seat configurations for local authority and community transport use.

A high-floor variant of the Strata, named the Strata HF 16 and marketed towards local authority and community transport operators, was later launched on both the 514 CDI (with a less powerful engine) and 516 CDI variants of the Sprinter, featuring a slightly reduced seating capacity but a completely flat floor throughout the interior, with options for a rear-mounted wheelchair lift and space for up to seven wheelchairs depending on seating configuration.

Since 2018, Mellor have offered two longer versions of the Strata, the 8.1m Strata Plus and the 8.7m Strata Ultra. The first Strata Ultra was delivered in 2019.

Mellor announced the launch of the second-generation Strata in April 2025, able to be specified in either standard, Plus and Ultra variants, the latter capable of carrying 29 seated passengers and one standing passenger. New features of the second-generation Strata include the step-free interior area being extended by 266 millimetres (10.5 in), permitting four seats as well as twin wheelchair bays to be added, steps up to the raised area being reduced to one, and the emergency exit door being brought forward in Plus and Ultra variants for an improved seating layout.

== Operators ==
=== First generation ===
Two of the largest local authority operators of Strata HF 16s are Lancashire County Council and East Riding of Yorkshire Council, taking delivery of 59 and 53 Stratas respectively between 2016 and 2025. Other operators of Strata HF 16s include Hartlepool Borough Council and Hull City Council.

The first two Strata LFs entered commercial service with McGill's Bus Services in late 2016 on their Inverclyde network. The Strata's first major group order followed in 2017, with Arriva North West taking delivery of nine Stratas for services in Macclesfield and Winsford in Cheshire. Other operators include Rotala Group's Diamond West Midlands, Diamond North West and Preston Bus for both commercial and contracted routes as well as the latter's Ribble Valley operations, Transdev Blazefield, whose Rosso subsidiary launched 18 Strata Ultras on 'Ribble Country' branded services across the Ribble Valley in 2021, following a prior delivery of five Stratas to the Keighley Bus Company in 2018, and Moffat & Williamson of Newport-on-Tay.

The Strata LF has also seen strong sales with local councils for community transport operations, with three Stratas delivered to Dumfries & Galloway Council's SWestrans operation and leased to Houston's Coaches of Lockerbie, three delivered to Redcar and Cleveland Council, and two delivered to Nottinghamshire County Council. Additionally, Strata LFs have been delivered to Stagecoach Manchester and First Manchester for Bee Network franchised bus services.

A Strata LF was also exported to Hong Kong in 2018 for trial use on public light bus services, however no orders resulted.

=== Second generation ===
Belle Vue Coaches received the first second-generation Stratas for their 391 service between Stockport and Macclesfield. However, Go South Coast were the first operator to put them into service, taking nine Strata Ultras for its Salisbury Reds 'Little Reds' rural minibus service in November 2025.

The West Yorkshire Combined Authority has ordered 33 second-generation Stratas built to Weaver Network specification for use on the AccessBus demand-responsive transport network.

== See also ==
- Mellor Maxima, a similar design on Iveco Daily chassis
- Mellor Orion, a similar design on Fiat Ducato chassis
- Mellor Tucana II, a similar design on Volkswagen Transporter chassis
