= First Greater Manchester =

Bus operator in Greater Manchester, England

- Bee Network branded Mellor Strata bodied Mercedes-Benz Sprinter at Bury Interchange in September 2026
- Parent: FirstGroup
- Founded: 1996
- Headquarters: Rochdale
- Service area: Greater Manchester
- Service type: Bus services
- Hubs: Bury; Middleton; Rochdale
- Depots: 1
- Fleet: 67 (August 2024)
- Website: Official website

First Greater Manchester is a bus operator in Greater Manchester. It is a subsidiary of the FirstGroup, operating franchised Bee Network bus services on contract to Transport for Greater Manchester (TfGM). The operator was once dominant in the northern areas of Greater Manchester, competing against Stagecoach Manchester, which was dominant in southern areas of the county; however in recent years it has scaled back its operations, now primarily serving the metropolitan boroughs of Oldham and Rochdale.

== History ==
=== GM Buses North ===
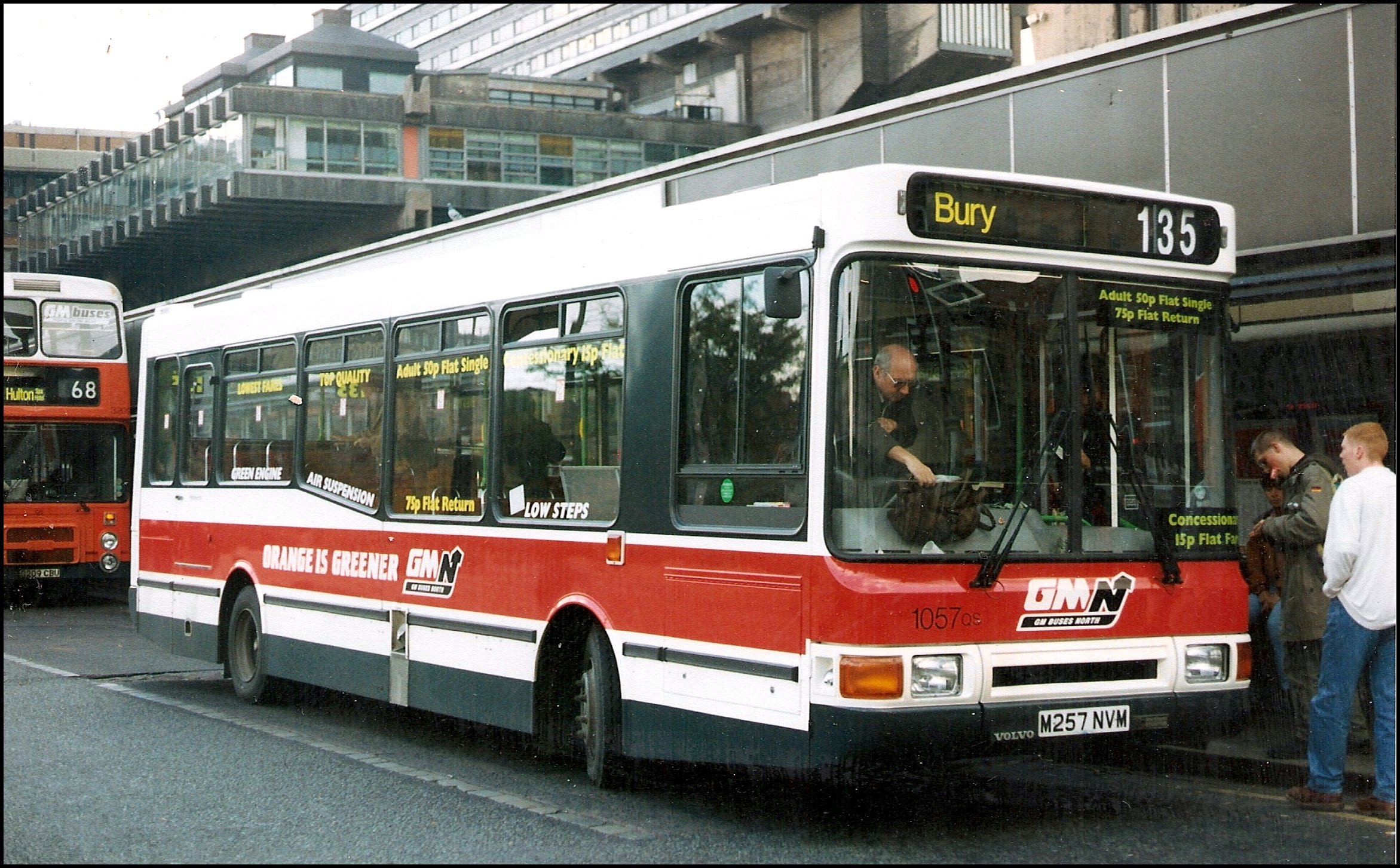
GM Buses North Northern Counties Paladin bodied Volvo B6LE at Piccadilly Gardens bus station, 1996

Before deregulation in 1986, buses in the Greater Manchester area were publicly funded and went under the name of Greater Manchester Transport. In 1986 Greater Manchester Transport became known as GM Buses, which was owned by the metropolitan borough and city councils of Greater Manchester, but were at arms' length from the local town halls.

In December 1993, GM Buses was split in two companies: GM Buses North and GM Buses South. It was planned that the two companies would compete against one another, however they operated without doing so through to their respective buyouts. GM Buses North was eventually sold in March 1994 by the Greater Manchester Passenger Transport Authority to a management buyout team for £27.1 million (equivalent to £57,180,559 in 2025).

=== FirstGroup ownership ===
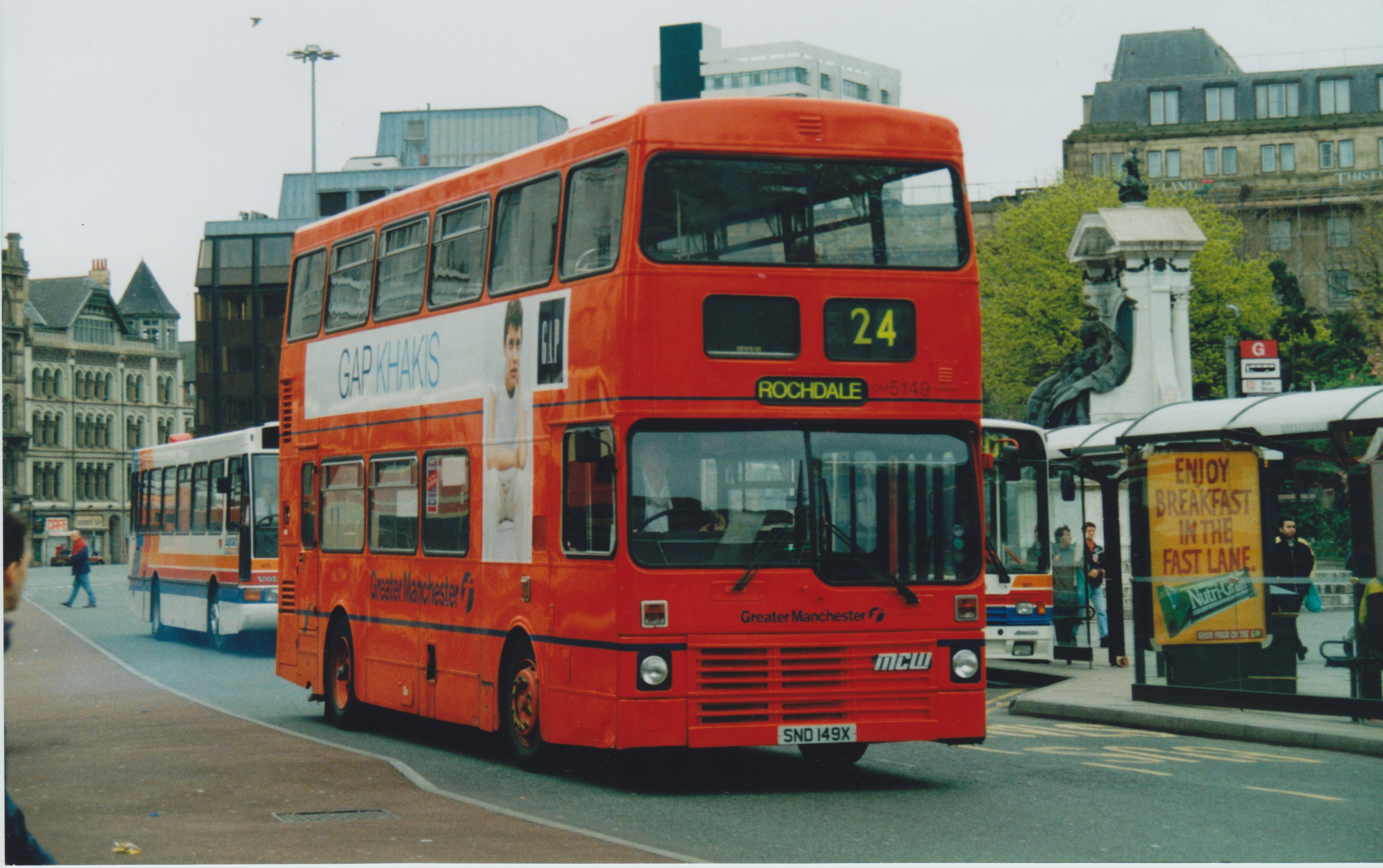
MCW Metrobus in early First Greater Manchester livery in central Manchester

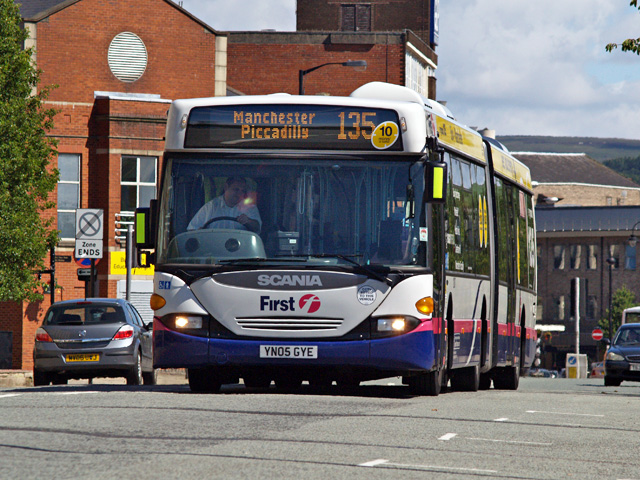
Scania OmniCity articulated bus on route 135 in Bury in July 2007

In March 1996, GM Buses North was sold to FirstBus for £47 million (equivalent to £94,339,998 in 2025) and rebranded First Manchester. After a period of experimentation with the livery, a deep orange livery featuring a blue stripe was adopted.

First Manchester soon ended up managing two other FirstBus subsidiaries, First Potteries and First Pennine. Eventually the First Pennine and Manchester subsidiaries were merged, adding a number of routes in the Tameside area to First Manchester. A new management team was put in place and First Manchester was relieved of its responsibility for the Potteries subsidiary. By September 2010, First Manchester had taken over the management of the Cheshire and Merseyside depots of First Potteries, with the Staffordshire depots transferring to the management of the new First Midlands division. The Cheshire and Merseyside depots fell to a First Manchester licence.

In June 2012, it was announced that the FirstGroup were looking at selling off some of its operations, which included First Manchester's Wigan depot. On 2 December 2012, Stagecoach Manchester purchased the Wigan operation. The transaction saw 300 employees, 120 vehicles (although 20 were owned by TfGM) and the Wigan depot purchased by Stagecoach, with these being operated under the former A Mayne & Son legal entity.

On 1 August 2013, the FirstGroup announced that subject to regulatory approval by the Office of Fair Trading, it had agreed to purchase the bus operations of south Manchester based company Finglands Coachways from its parent, the EYMS Group. The purchase included the lease of Finglands's depot in Rusholme, South Manchester routes and approximately 100 members of staff, but did not include the fleet of 41 buses, most of which were retained within the EYMS Group. The deal was approved on 27 January 2014, with First taking over Finglands services under a joint ticketing scheme on 9 February 2014.

=== Downsizing ===
The FirstGroup began scaling back its operations in Greater Manchester in an attempt to stem financial losses across the group in 2017, closing its Bury and Dukinfield depots, with buses and operations transferring to its remaining four garages in Bolton, Queens Road, Oldham and Rusholme. Rusholme depot would later close in January 2019, bringing the company down to only three garages across Greater Manchester.

In February 2019, it was announced that the Queens Road depot in Cheetham Hill had been purchased by the Go-Ahead Group to form Go North West, which commenced operations on 2 June 2019, having acquired 25 bus routes and a fleet of over 160 buses from First. First's Bolton depot was then purchased by Rotala on 11 August 2019, expanding the operation of Diamond North West with the acquisition 18 routes, reducing First Greater Manchester to only its Oldham depot; this depot was also planned to be sold by the FirstGroup, which would have seen the operator cease operations, however the depot was announced to have been retained in August 2019 after no offers were accepted to buy it.

=== Bee Network franchises ===
In June 2023, it was announced by Transport for Greater Manchester that as part of Tranche 2 of Bee Network bus franchising, First Manchester would lose its Oldham depot, staff and services to Stagecoach Manchester. However, First Manchester also acquired the franchise to operate Bee Network services in Rochdale, based from Transdev Blazefield subsidiary Rosso's former depot, which was sold to TfGM some months prior. These changes, taking effect from 24 March 2024, reduced First Manchester's fleet to over 65 buses.

== Former operations ==
=== Metroshuttle ===
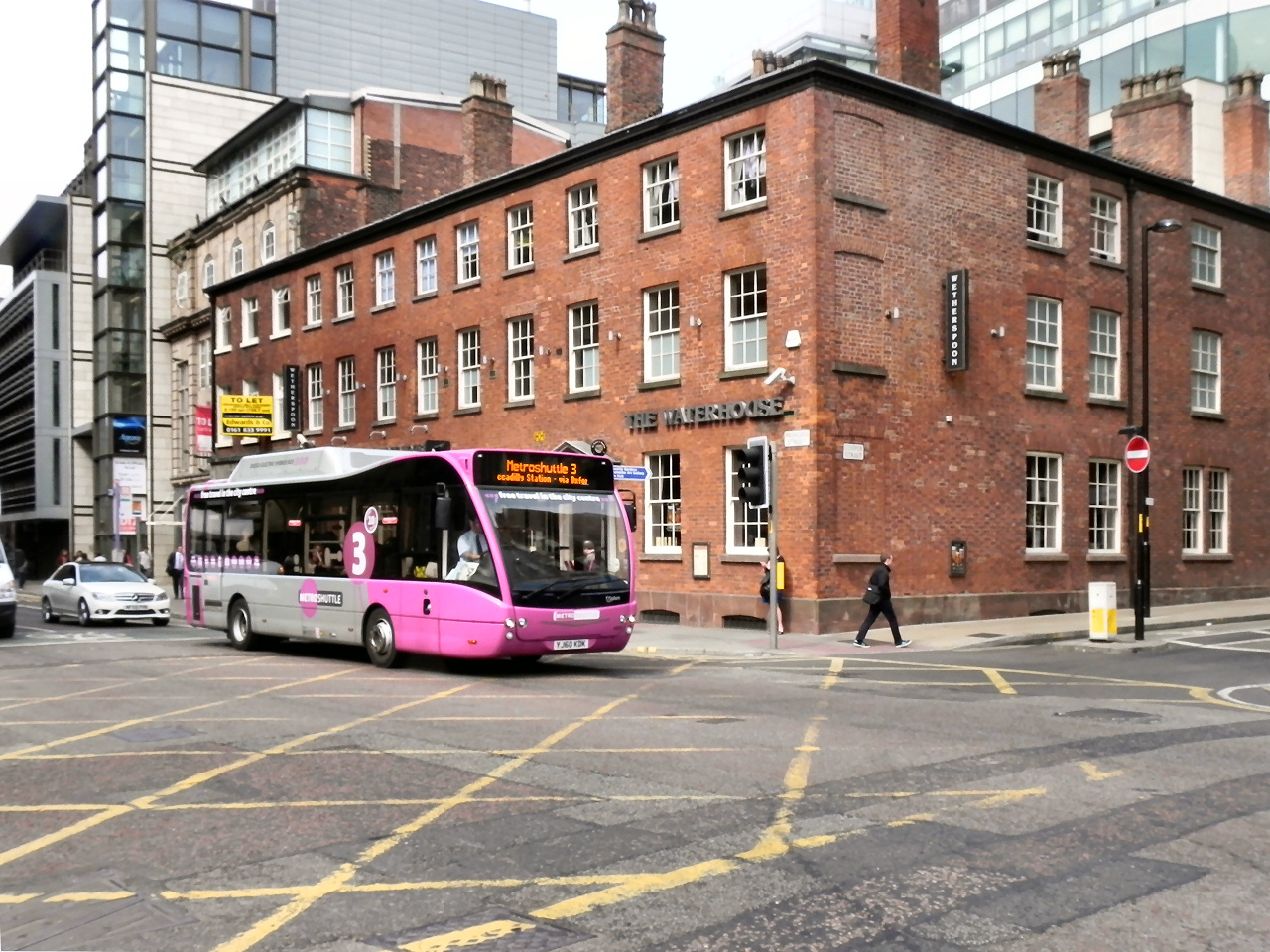
Optare Versa on Metroshuttle route 3 in May 2011

First Greater Manchester previously operated the three Metroshuttle services that operate around Manchester city centre. These services were free for passengers, and were operated using Optare Versas based from Queens Road garage. The Metroshuttle service were renamed as 'free bus' in 2018, with buses transferred to Go North West when Queens Road garage was sold in June 2019.

=== Night buses ===
First Greater Manchester operated several night bus services across Greater Manchester on Friday and Saturday nights. The routes mainly operated the same routes as their daytime equivalents with some exceptions, such as service 67 not serving Shudehill on nights, with service 135, which did not normally serve Shudehill, taking its place. The Nightbus services, mainly originating from Piccadilly Gardens bus station, ran to a frequency of either every 30 minutes or every hour from midnight to 3:30am and offered a flat fare ticketing system.

Until December 2012, First Greater Manchester also operated the Nightbus network in Wigan town centre, providing a number of late night services to various areas across Wigan, as well as the 598 service to Leigh, which allowed connection with the 39 service to and from Manchester. From 2 December 2012, the Wigan Nightbus network passed to Stagecoach Manchester with the sale of First's Wigan operations.

In January 2015, First withdrew six night bus journeys which served Rochdale, Bury and Eccles, including service 135, as part of wide-ranging cuts to its bus network. In Spring 2016, First's remaining night bus services were withdrawn on services 8, 36 and 39 due to low passenger numbers.

=== Vantage ===
On 3 April 2016, First Greater Manchester commenced operating services on the 4.5 miles (7.2 km) North West Guided busway between Leigh and Ellenbrook. A fleet of 25 Wright Gemini 3 bodied Volvo B5LH hybrid buses equipped with guidewheels were operated by First on the service, branded in a dark purple Vantage livery.

First's operation of Vantage services transferred to Go North West upon commencement of Tranche 1 of Bee Network franchised services, with the Vantage brand being withdrawn in favour of standard Bee Network yellow livery.

== Criticism ==
In the years following the purchase of GM Buses North, First Manchester were routinely criticised for operating an outdated and poorly maintained fleet of buses, many of which were either inherited from the GM Buses era or transferred in from across the FirstGroup; this fleet stood in comparison to more modern fleets operated by competitor Stagecoach Manchester. First Manchester's final 'GM Standard' Leyland Atlantean double-decker buses, dating back to the late 1970s and early 1980s, were withdrawn on 5 January 2002, and investment between 2002 and 2004 saw 278 new low-floor buses introduced to the fleet.

In February 2012, the company were warned by the Department for Transport's North West traffic commissioner after a performance survey found an average of 26% of First Manchester services were not running on time. The company were fined £285,000 the following March for not improving their service reliability.

== Fleet and depots ==
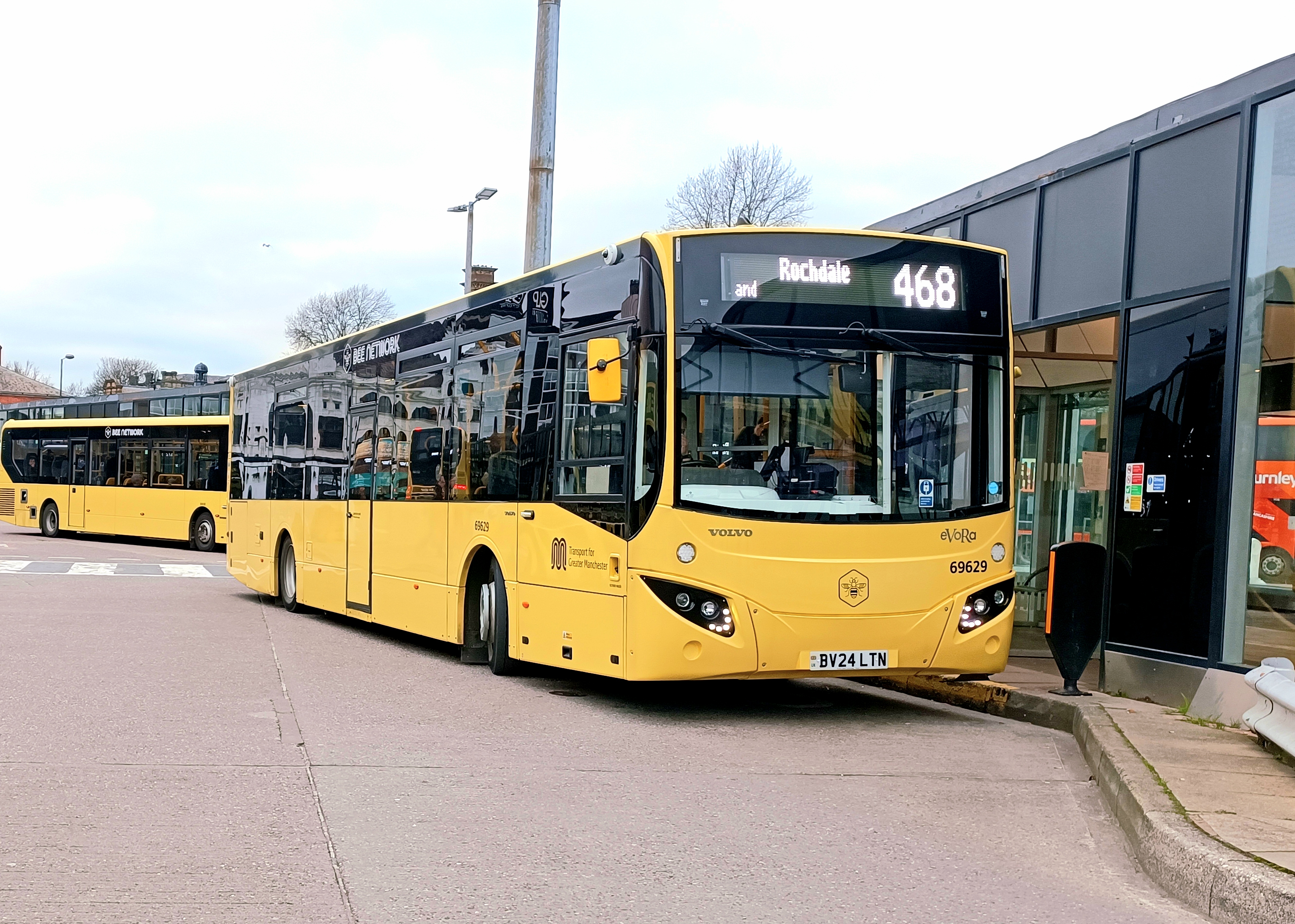
Bee Network branded MCV Evora bodied Volvo B8RLE in Bury Interchange in December 2025

As of March 2024, the First Greater Manchester fleet consisted of over 65 buses, over half of which are operated on franchised Bee Network services. Buses are operated from one depot: First's main depot at Rochdale, which was acquired from Rosso.

Prior to the sale of the Bolton and Queens Road depots in 2019, First Greater Manchester operated a fleet of 583 buses, consisting mainly of Wrightbus-bodied Volvos and Alexander Dennis Enviro400s. Up to 160 buses at Queens Road were sold to Go North West and 125 buses based at Bolton, following a period on lease to Diamond North West, were dispersed around the FirstGroup.

Various other GM Buses North garages were closed shortly after the company was purchased by FirstBus. These included Atherton in 1998; Bolton and Rochdale in 2004, the former replaced by a new depot on Weston Street; Trafford Park in 2005, used temporarily for long-term rail replacement services during the West Coast Main Line route modernisation, and Knowsley in 2008. Temporary depots have also been previously set up, with sites at Lowton and Bolton used to temporarily store buses acquired from other operators in 1998, while a site was set up at Manchester Piccadilly in 2002 to store shuttle buses used for the 2002 Commonwealth Games.

== See also ==
- Timeline of public passenger transport operations in Manchester
