= Pennine Blue =

Bus company in Greater Manchester, England

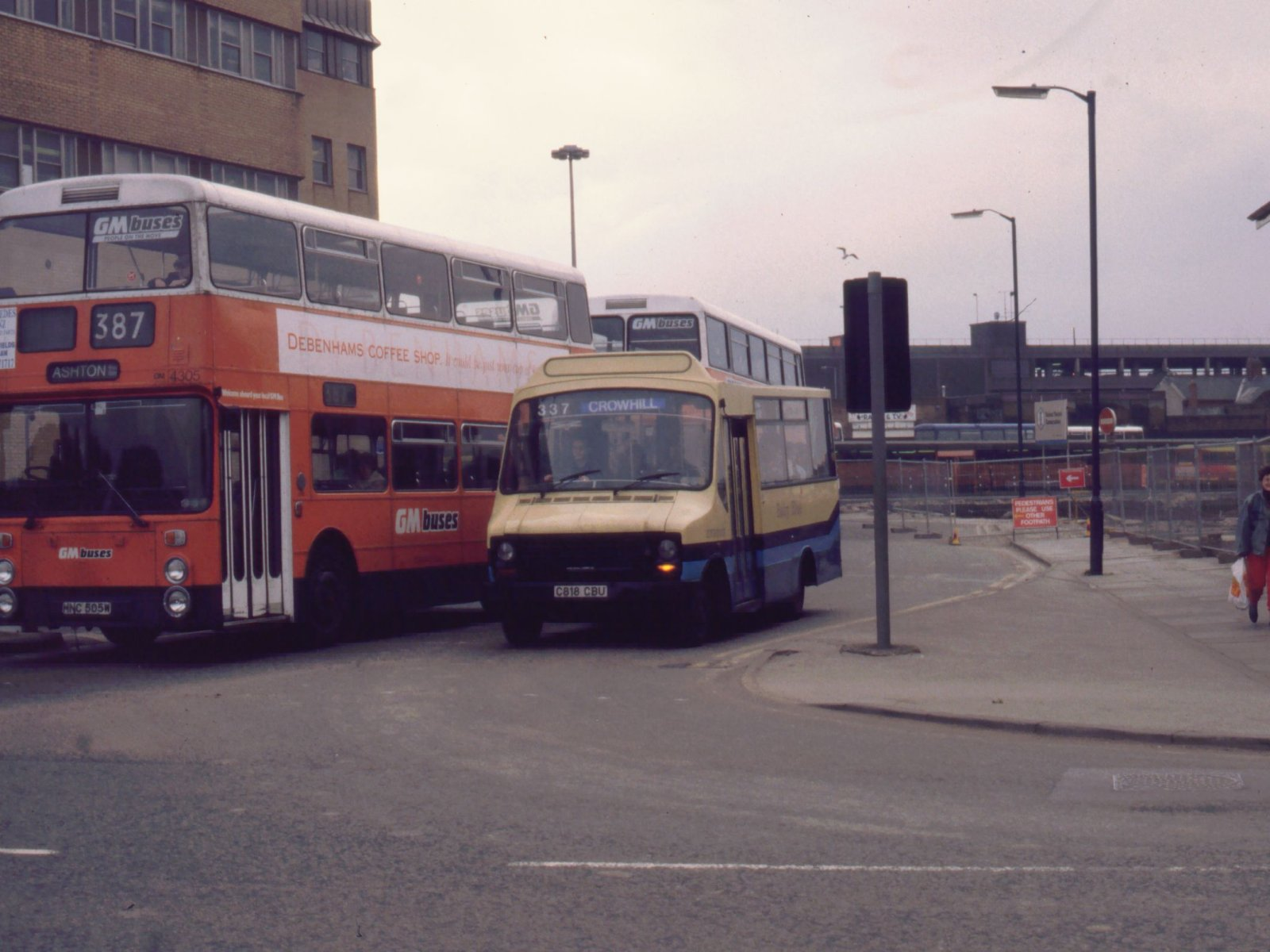
Northern Counties bodied Dodge S50 minibus seen in service with Pennine Blue on the 337 route (Hazelhurst-Crowhill)

Pennine Blue, later known as First Pennine, was a bus company serving the Tameside area of Greater Manchester, England. It was an independent bus company running services to/from Ashton-under-Lyne in the late 1980s and early 1990s. Its depot was initially based at Britannia Street in Ashton-Under-Lyne, before moving to the Globe Industrial Estate in Dukinfield, and finally its final location on Broadway in Dukinfield where it operated as First Pioneer, later as part of First Greater Manchester, until the depot’s closure in 2017.

== Routes ==
The first route to be operated was the 348 service from Mossley, Micklehurst, via Ashton under Lyne to Denton and Haughton Green. This followed the route of the GMBuses 348 service from Haughton Green to Ashton, and the 350 service to Micklehurst. At a later date this service was further extended to Hey Farm. Further developments saw the introduction of a 351 service from Ashton to Carrbrook in Stalybridge, a 346 service from Hyde to Droylsden via the GMB 346 route to Ashton, and then the GMB 382 route to Droylsden. Journeys were also introduced on the 347 service from Ashton to Haughton Green, the 409 to Oldham and on the 42 along the Oxford Road corridor out of Manchester. In the later days of the service, Pennine Blue also operated some journeys on the famous Trans-Lancs Express 400 service, between Stockport and Ashton. Stockport was also served by the 328 service from Mossley via Denton, the 330 from Ashton and Hyde, and also a 381 service from Ashton and Denton.

== Bus fleet ==
The company operated a large and varied fleet of Bristol RE single deck buses, a number of which were bought from Belfast. A couple of Leyland Nationals were also bought. Double deckers included a number of ECW bodied Bristol VRTs, at least one former GMT Standard, and a Leeds 'Jumbo' Leyland Atlantean. A number of minibuses were also operated; under the name 'Baby Blue' and were given the names of cartoon characters. Their first new bus was an Optare MetroRider named 'Dennis the Menace' which arrived around the time of the takeover by PMT, appearing in Pennine Blue's familiar blue and cream livery, the second followed soon after and named 'Beryl the Peril'/ Following the take over by PMT, a large number of PMT Bristol VRTs were drafted into the fleet, some of which were painted into the Pennine Blue livery, although this did not last long.

== Takeovers ==
The company was taken over by PMT in the mid-1990s and would adopt the PMT livery to its services, which resulted in the change of the name from Pennine Blue to Pennine, as the livery changed from blue to yellow and red. The first vehicles to appear in the red and yellow livery, with the addition of a Badgerline group Badger were two ex Bristol dual door Bristol VRTs. The company would change to First Pennine in light of the 1995 merger of GRT Group Holdings and Badgerline PLC and the formation of FirstBus. In the early 21st century, First Pennine would become part of First Greater Manchester. Although, officially the services in Tameside were First Manchester services, First had originally registered the services as First Pennine. However, this was later changed to First Pioneer.

In June 2017, First announced the closure of Dukinfield depot, along with the depot in Bury. All routes operated by First Pioneer in Tameside (excluding routes 348 and 350, which were transferred to Oldham depot), were transferred to Stagecoach Manchester’s depot in Ashton-under-Lyne, as well as other smaller operators such as Stotts Tours and Nexus Move.
