= First Potteries =

Bus company based in Stoke-on-Trent operating services in North Staffordshire, England

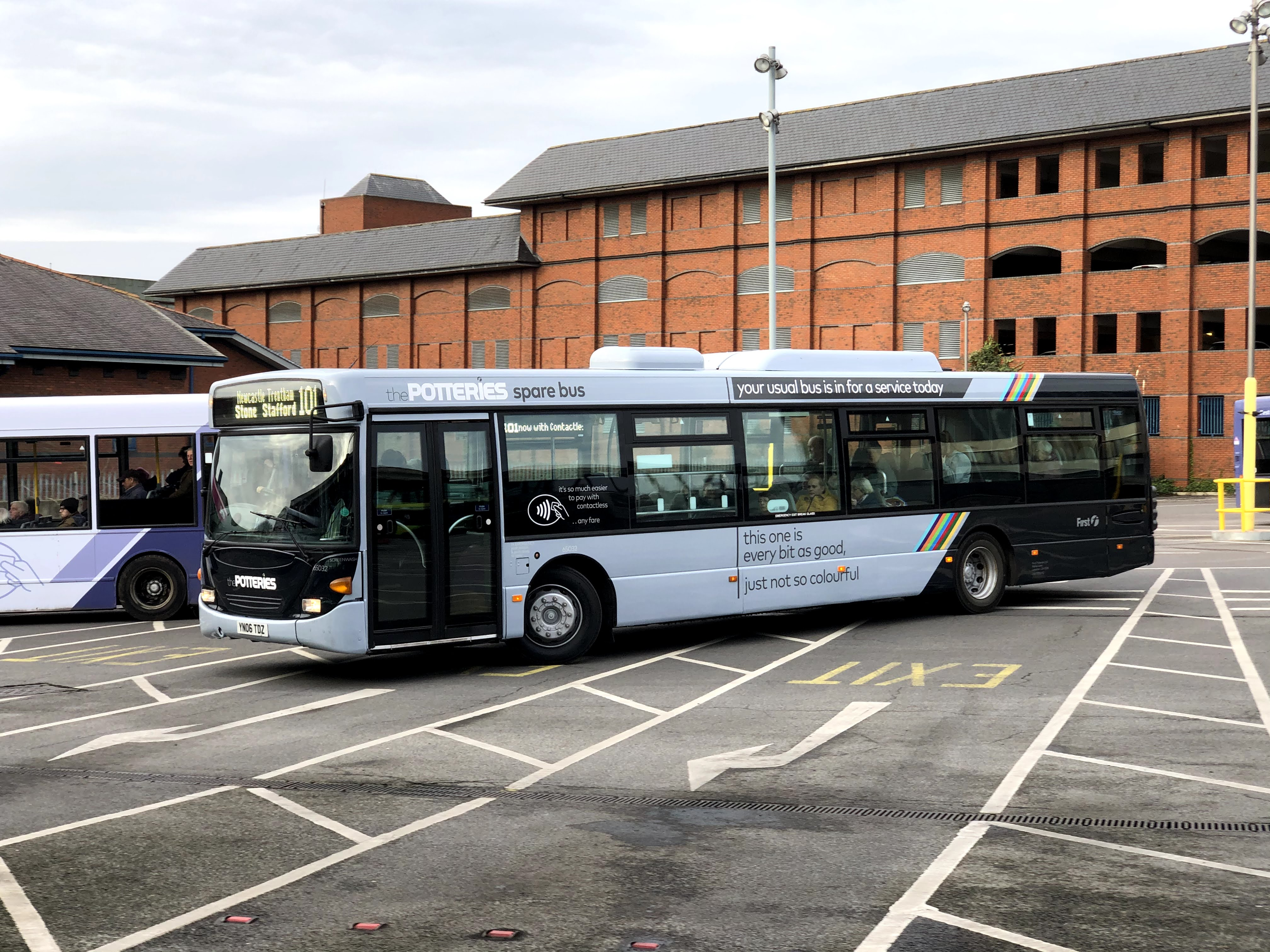
- Scania Omnicity with Spare branding for The Potteries at Hanley bus station.
- Parent: FirstGroup
- Headquarters: Abbey Lane, Leicester
- Service area: Stoke-on-Trent; The Potteries; Stafford; Crewe; Leek
- Service type: Bus services
- Depots: Adderley Green
- Fleet: 114 (January 2018)
- Fuel type: Diesel
- Operator: First Midlands
- Chief executive: Nigel Eggleton
- Website: firstbus.co.uk/potteries

First Potteries is a bus company based in Stoke-on-Trent operating services in North Staffordshire, England. It is a part of First Midlands and a subsidiary of FirstGroup.

== History ==
=== Potteries Motor Traction ===
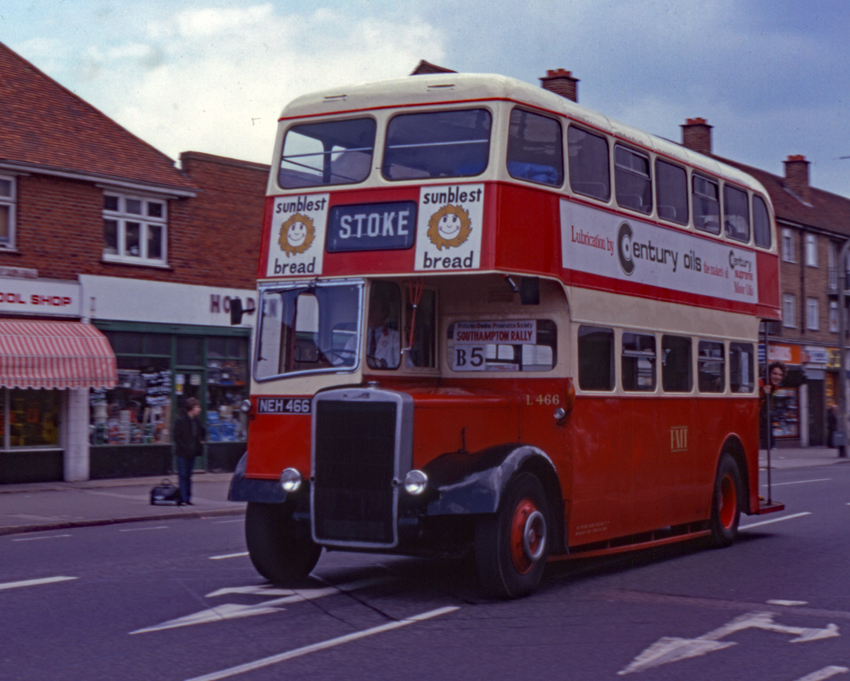
PMT Leyland OPD2/1 in Bitterne, 1979

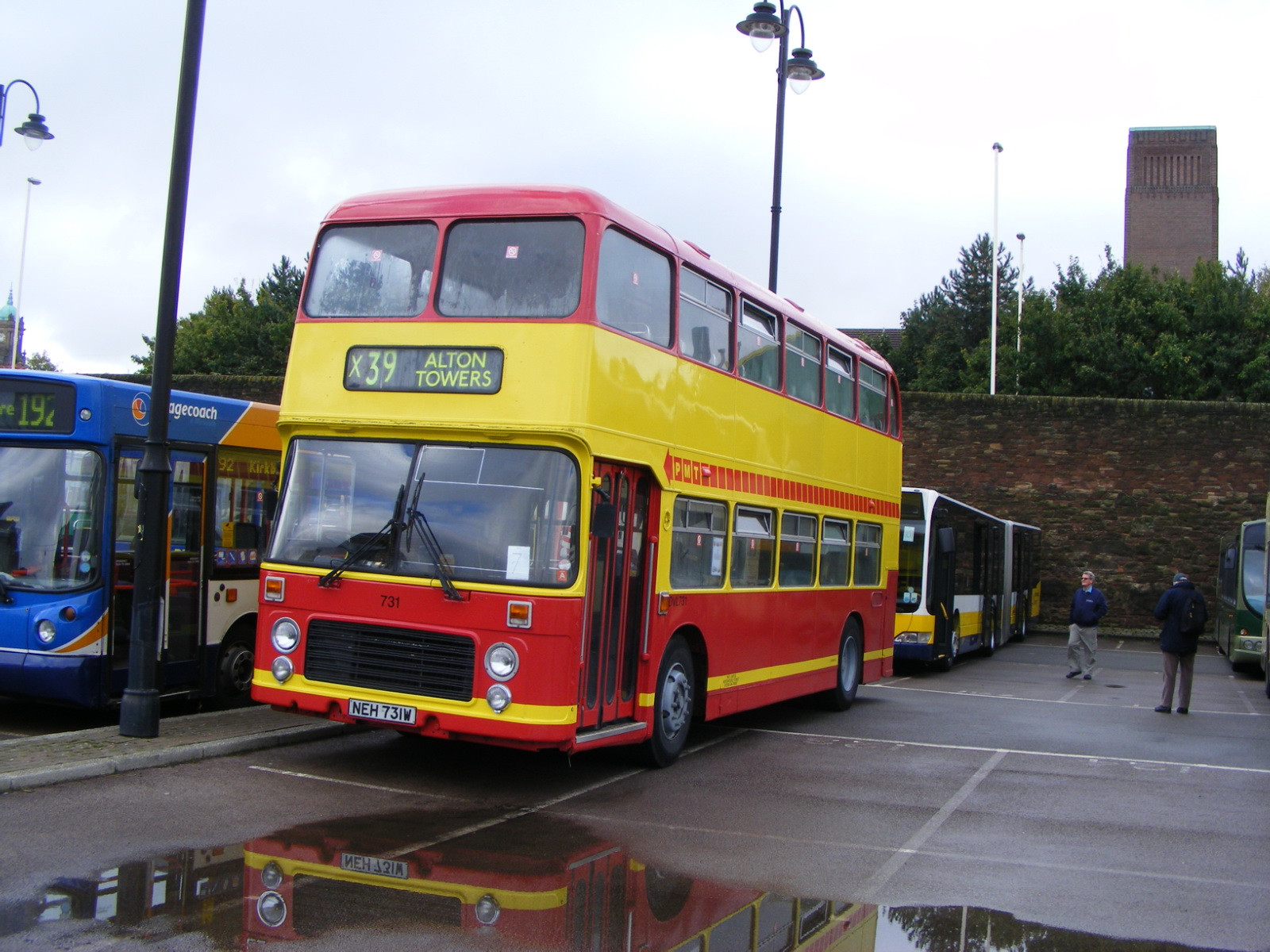
Bristol VRT in PMT red and yellow livery at Wirral Bus & Tram Show October 2008

The business began life in 1898 as a tram operator, the Potteries Electric Traction Company, which quickly acquired even earlier operators dating back to the early 1860s. Tram services ended in 1928 and in 1933 the name was revised to Potteries Motor Traction. As part of the privatisation of the National Bus Company, PMT Limited was created on 12 December 1986 when it was purchased by its management and employees. The team leading PMT's buyout were managing director Mike Moors, traffic manager Steve Ellis, chief engineer Barry Parkinson and company secretary Nigel Barrett.

Expansion came quickly for PMT, and it had commenced operations outside its traditional North Staffordshire area a little over six weeks prior to purchase from NBC. On 25 October 1986, the day bus services in the UK were deregulated, a small outstation was established in the neighbouring town of Crewe. This was followed by a venture into Merseyside with the opening of a Red Rider outstation at Moreton on the Wirral Peninsula. A small operation in Leeds commenced in 1988, followed a year later by the winning of tenders in the West Midlands. This led to vehicles being outstationed at a haulage company's yard in Willenhall.

On 6 February 1990, PMT purchased the Wirral, Ellesmere Port and Chester operations of Crosville Motor Services from the Drawlane Group. PMT also purchased Pennine Blue, serving the Tameside area of Greater Manchester.

=== FirstGroup ownership ===
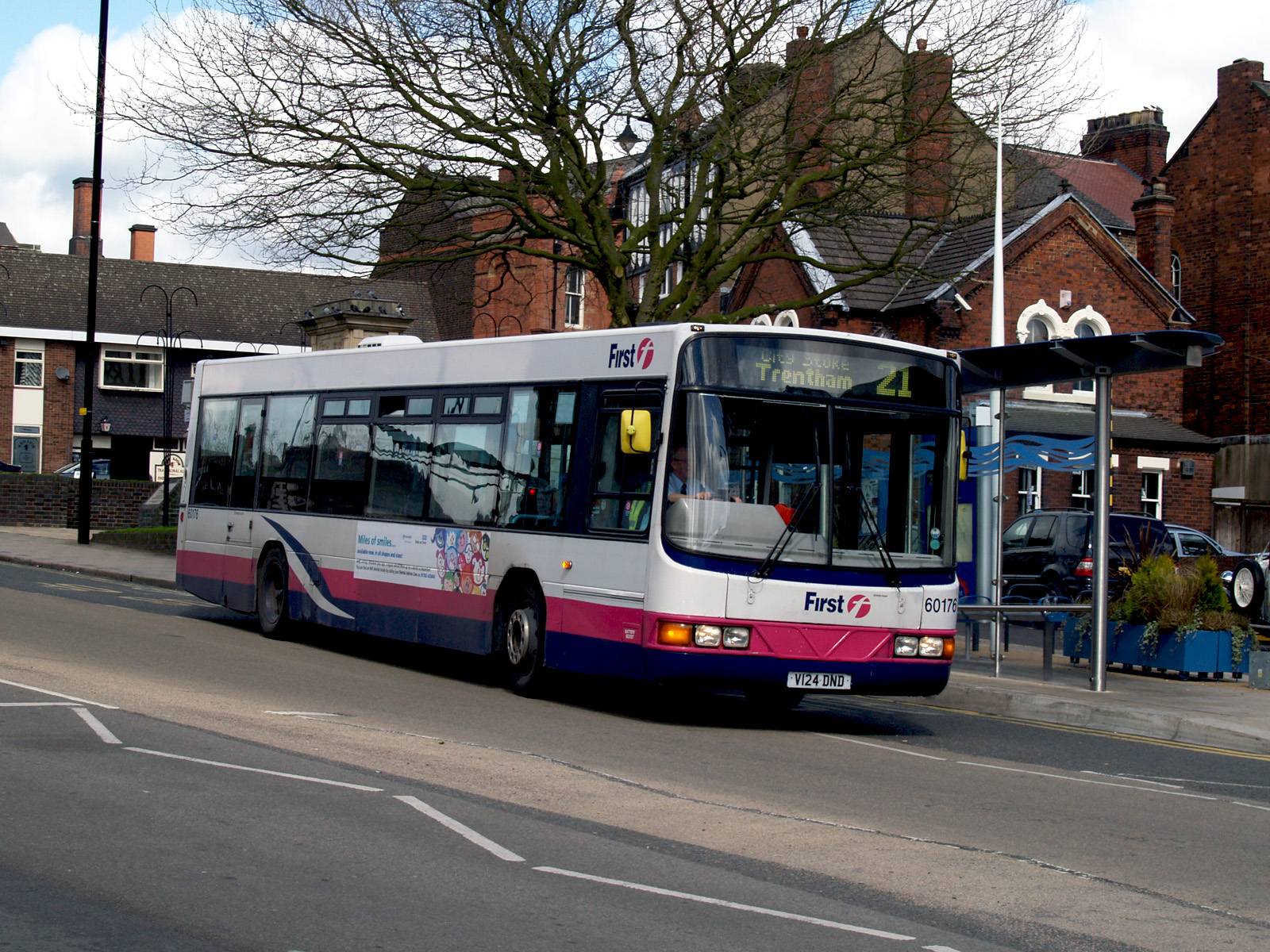
Wright Axcess-Floline bodied Scania L94UB in Burslem in April 2009

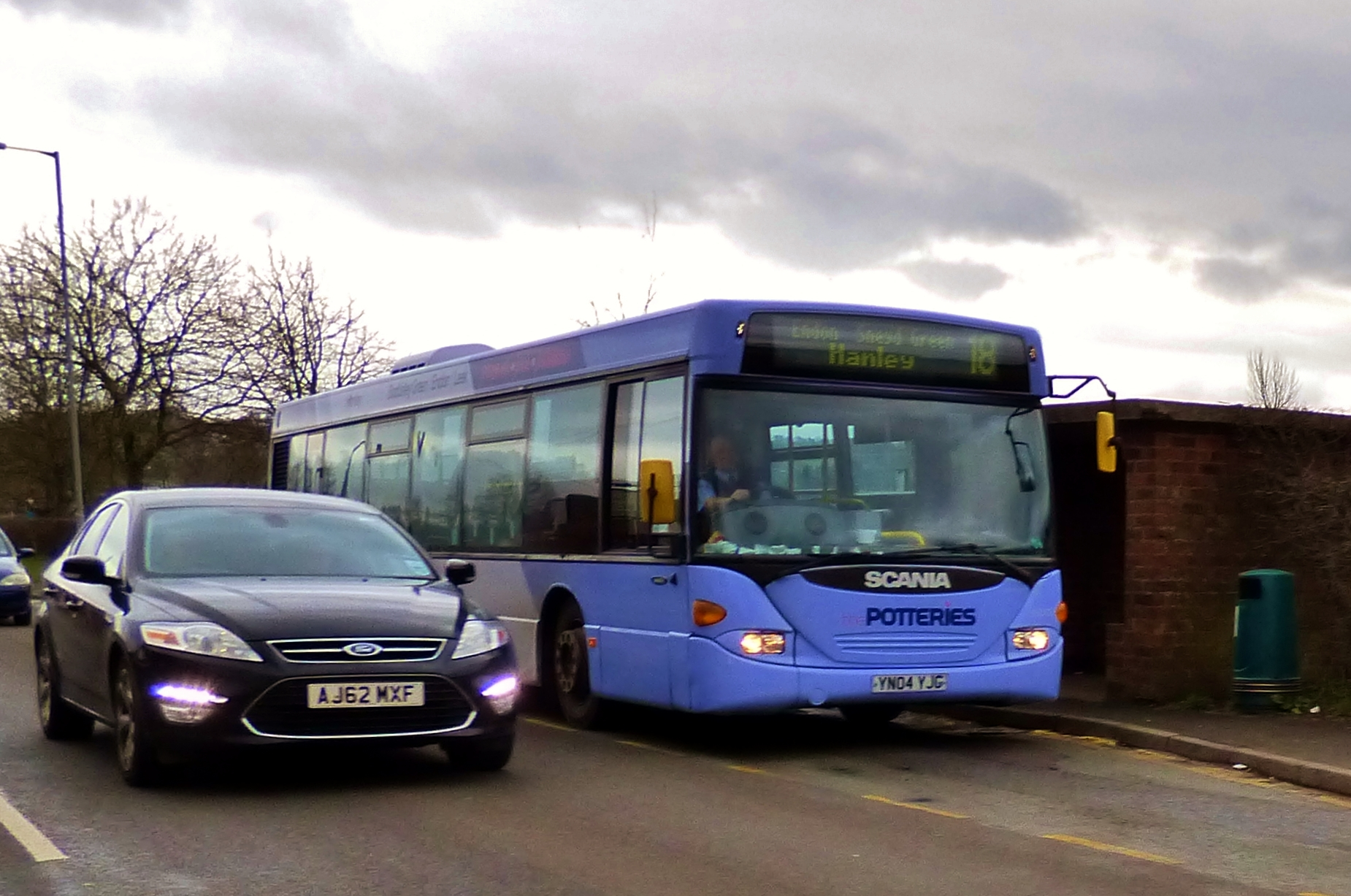
Scania Omnicity near Stoke-On-Trent in March 2015

PMT were purchased by Badgerline in 1994 before the parent company merged with GRT Group and formed FirstBus in 1995. The sale included the former Crosville operations in Chester and the Wirral.

A network of services in Chester was acquired through the purchase of ChesterBus in 2007. This business was integrated with the existing First Chester & The Wirral, which already ran a network of services in these areas.

In 2010, FirstGroup changed the management structure of First Potteries. The Staffordshire area operations are now part of First Midlands (which consists of First Leicester and First Wyvern) with its group office at Adderley Green, Stoke-on-Trent. The Cheshire and Merseyside area depots became part of First Manchester. These were subsequently sold to Stagecoach in 2012.

Crewe depot has been closed and has transferred vehicles and services to Newcastle-under-Lyme. In October 2013 First Potteries took responsibility for First Midlands' depots in Hereford and Worcester. The Chester & Wirral operations were sold to Stagecoach Merseyside in December 2012.

First Potteries now operates mainly urban services in and around Stoke-on-Trent, Newcastle-under-Lyme and the surrounding towns and villages. Route numbers change & some buses have been repainted in the new livery as well as Wi-Fi being provided free of charge on newer buses.

== Liveries ==
The traditional colours of the PMT fleet were red and cream. During National Bus Company ownership in the 1970s and 1980s, poppy red and white livery was used. Following privatisation, the livery became red and yellow with the fleetname in a 'zipper' logo. Despite this, several variations were introduced to suit individual routes – Silverdale Shuttle and Bradwell Shuttle, which saw the red replaced with blue; Hospitalslink, a scheme used exclusively on a handful of minibuses and which was green-based; and Birches Head Townabout, again a minibus operation and which received a yellow and orange livery. Additionally, a pair of minibuses gained a purple and white and then yellow and black variant to promote the Ball Green to Tunstall service. In 1987 PMT purchased Turners of Brown Edge and until the late 1990s some vehicles in the fleet were painted into Turners Tudor Maroon and Cream to work the 8 Hanley-Brown Edge service, subsequently extended from Brown Edge to Endon.

All these liveries have now been completely superseded by the FirstGroup corporate livery. In 2011 four buses were repainted in PMT red and yellow when routes 25 and 26 were launched as gold services.

For the 2016 open day at Adderley Green Garage, two further Wright Gemini double decker buses were repainted, one of which is in the old style red and cream PMT livery. The other in silver, red and yellow, a heritage livery used on the original 6 Leyland Olympians introduced in 1989 for the 320 Hanley-Crewe route.

== Fleet and depots ==
As of March 2013, the fleet consisted of 185 buses based in the Adderley Green area of Stoke-on-Trent. A small number of buses use an outstation in Newcastle-under-Lyme.

== See also ==
- Potteries Electric Traction Company
- List of bus operators of the United Kingdom
