= Diamond North West =

Bus operator in Greater Manchester

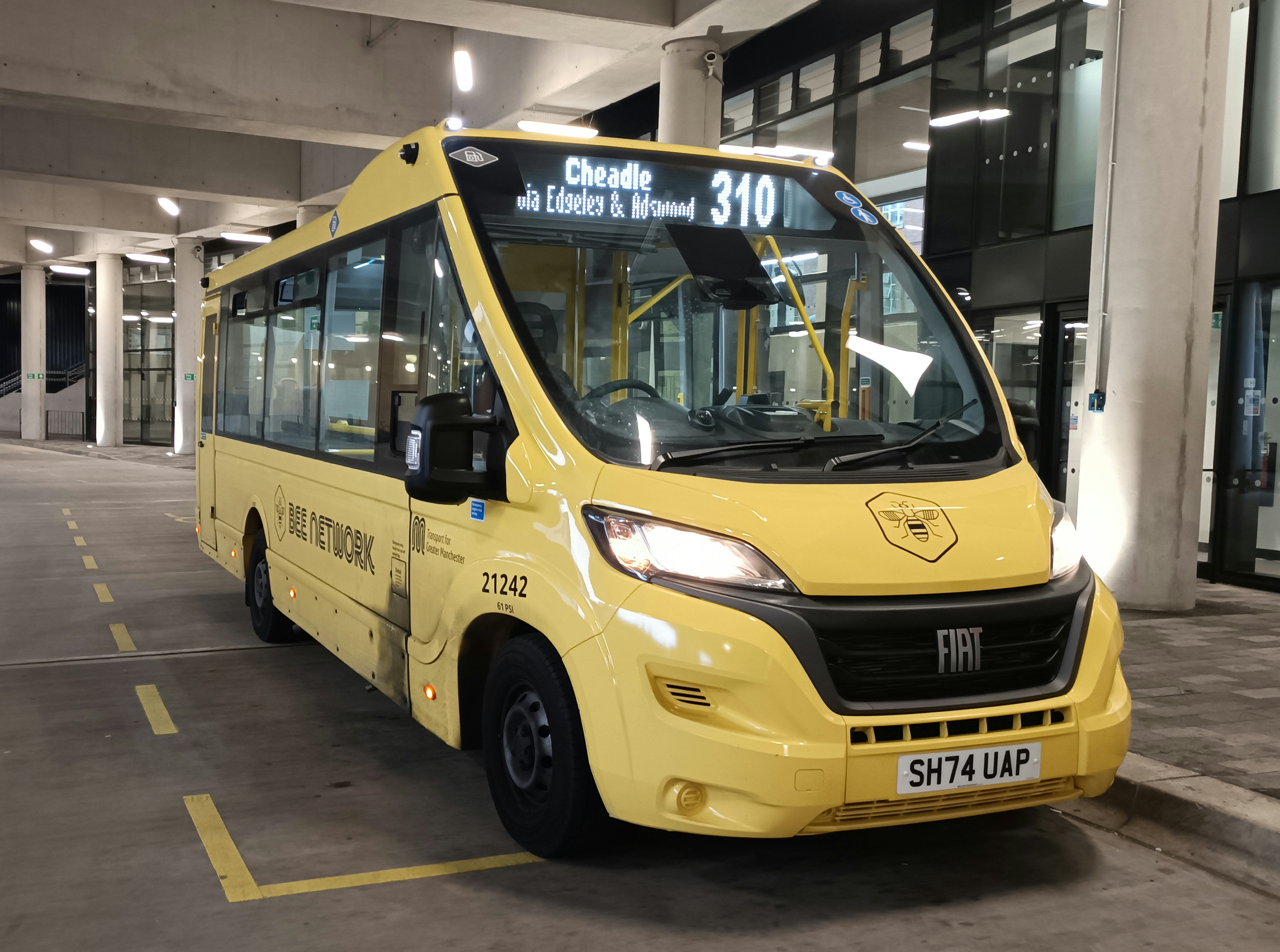
- Bee Network branded Mellor Orion bodied Fiat Ducato in Stockport Interchange in July 2025
- Parent: Rotala
- Founded: April 1998 (as Green Triangle Buses)
- Headquarters: Eccles
- Service area: Greater Manchester; Lancashire
- Service type: Bus services
- Routes: 56
- Hubs: Ashton, Oldham, Manchester, Bolton, Wigan, Salford, Stockport
- Depots: 2
- Website: Official website

Diamond Bus (North West) Ltd., trading as Diamond North West, is a bus operator providing franchised services Bee Network bus services on contract to Transport for Greater Manchester mainly in the boroughs of Bolton and Wigan in Greater Manchester, England. As well as this, Diamond North West also operates some Bee Network bus services in Salford, Trafford and Tameside.

The company was founded as Green Triangle Buses and then subsequently renamed South Lancs Travel before being purchased by Rotala and rebranded as Diamond North West in 2015. In August 2019, Diamond North West purchased First Manchester's Bolton garage, which was later sold with its vehicles to Transport For Greater Manchester, and is currently operated under the Bee Network by Go North West under Tranche 1 of the Bee Network.

== History ==
=== South Lancs Travel ===
Former South Lancs Travel logo

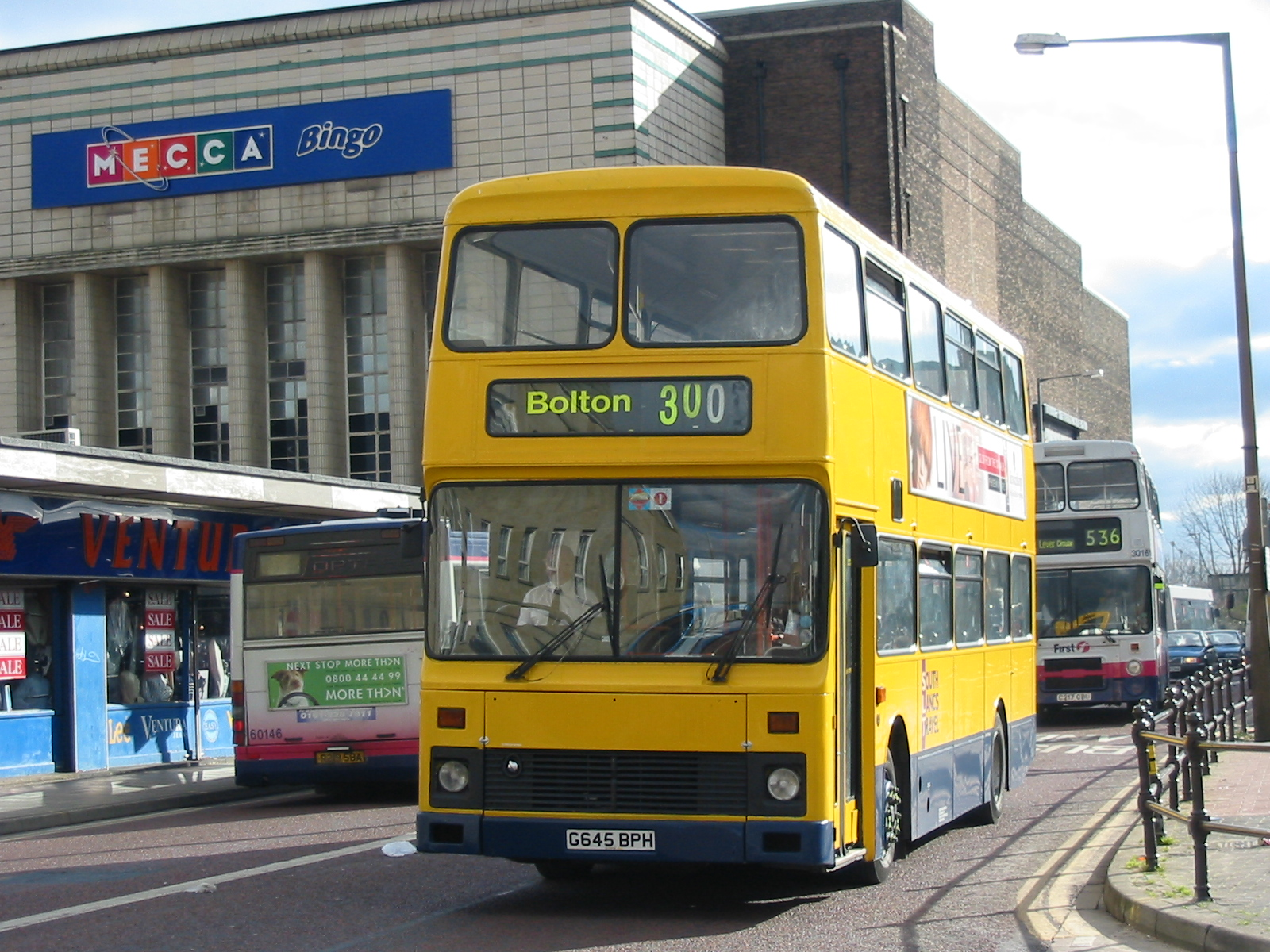
South Lancs Travel Northern Counties Palatine bodied Volvo Citybus in February 2004

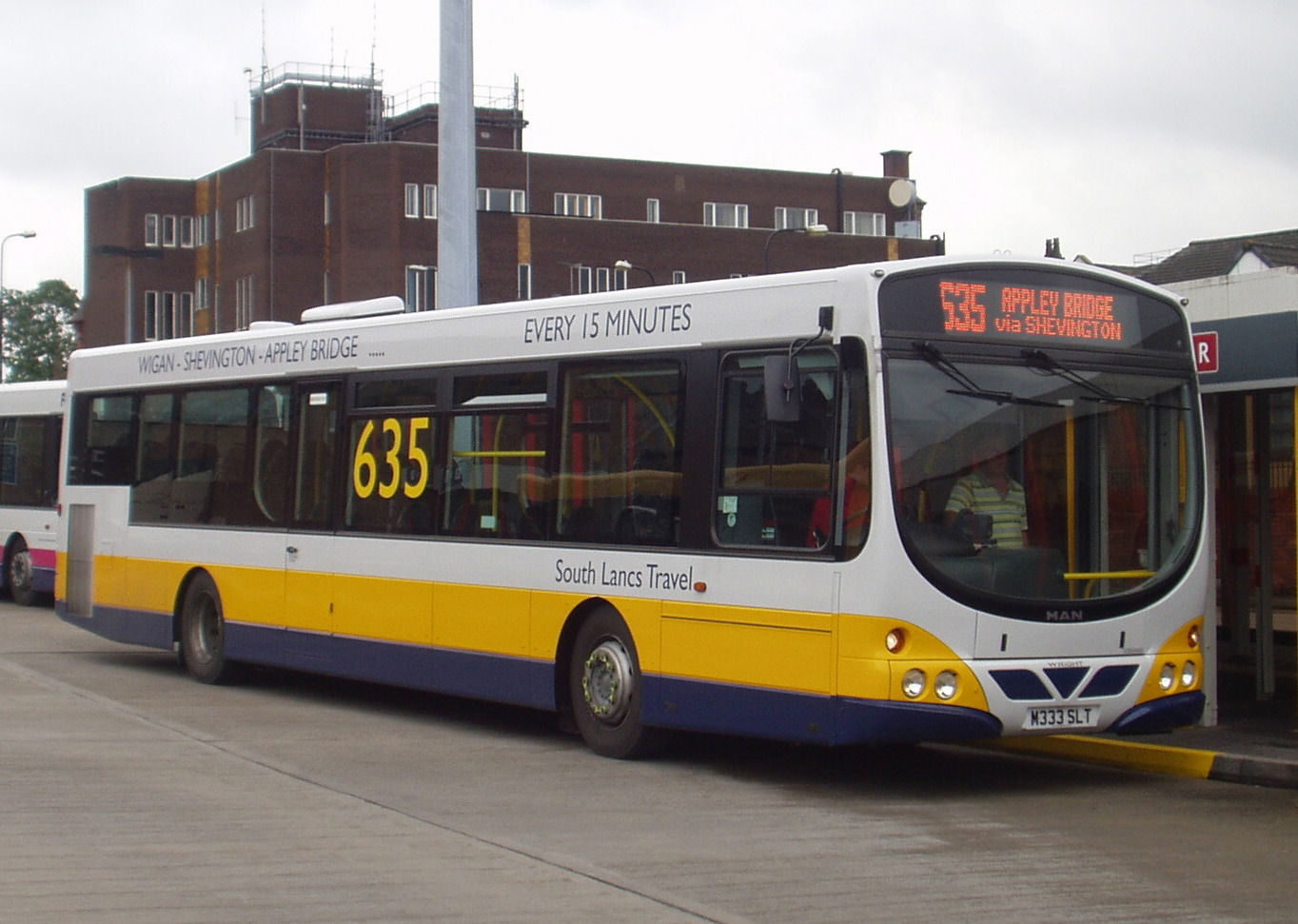
South Lancs Travel Wright Meridian bodied MAN NL273F at Wigan bus station in August 2009

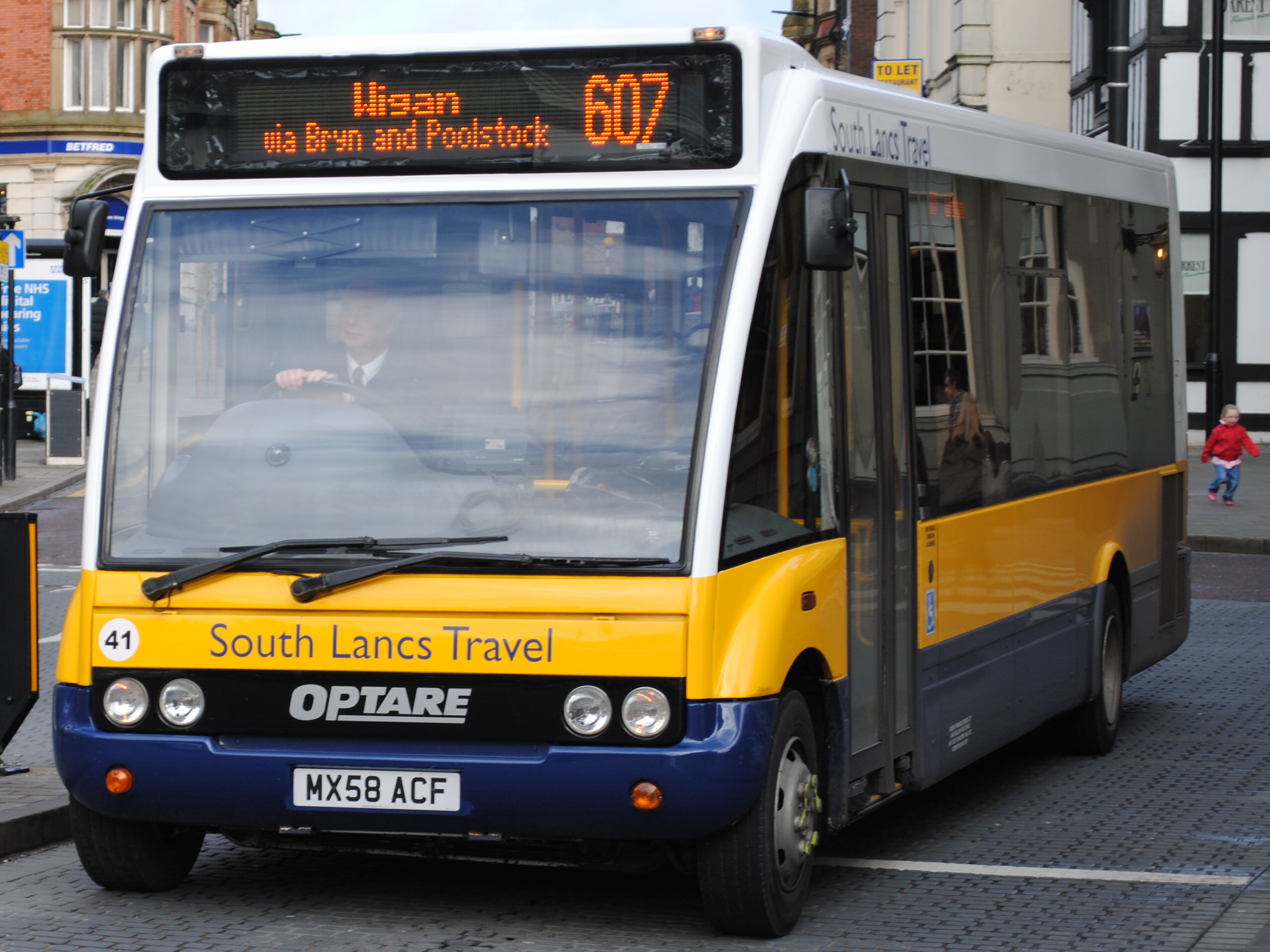
South Lancs Travel Optare Solo in February 2013

Green Triangle Buses was established in April 1998 by Martin Bott and David Stewart. The new business began with two new Mercedes-Benz Varios which were used on a Greater Manchester Passenger Transport Executive tender. These were joined by three South Lancashire Transport (also owned by the two partners) single deckers for use on school services.

Further Varios were quickly added to the fleet, which were used on Green Triangle's first commercial service, route 675 a half-hourly service between Leigh and Shakerley via Astley and Tyldesley.

Less than a year later, route 675 was withdrawn and replaced with the 670/680 circular services. This essentially provided an extension to the existing service, running back to Leigh via Atherton. This was supplemented through the introduction of route 652 (Leigh - Hindley - Wigan). All three services directly competed against the incumbent operator, Bellairs & Dootson.

An opportunity for expansion came in 1998 with the opening of the Trafford Centre. Green Triangle introduced two new daytime services to the centre in the form of the 673 from Atherton and the 674 from Leigh. The 673 only lasted a short time, although the route was later reinstated and extended to Wigan as the 132. The 674 continues to this day, although it is now re-numbered as the 126.

In 1999 the business of Bellairs & Dootson was purchased. The combined operation was rebranded as South Lancs Travel. In 2000 the depot was relocated to its current premises.

Since then, the company has steadily expanded its network, primarily through tender gains. This expansion took the company deeper into both Wigan and Bolton, with the most significant gain being the award of the GMPTE Easylink network of services.

Commercial work was also added, with SLT taking over route 592 (between Shakerley and Bolton) in 2002, acquiring the service from the one-man Atherton Bus Company following the retirement of the owner. This was linked up with an existing service to form a through service from Leigh to Bolton.

The company also added a network of services in western Wigan in 2005, when it purchased Blue Bus of Bolton's Appley Bridge outstation. This included a small network of services to Shevington, Standish, Orrell and New Springs. The Appley Bridge outstation closed in May 2007.

In 2006, entrepreneur Julian Peddle bought a 30% stake in the company.

South Lancs Travel have also been involved in head-to-head competition with First Manchester on a number of occasions. The most notable of these took place in 2002, when, following competitive registrations by First, SLT offered "return tickets for the price of a single fare" - First responded with a £2.00 (later £2.50 then £3.00) weekly ticket for travel within the Leigh area.

First also introduced a short-lived competing 652 service, albeit operating from Hindley Green to Shakerley via Leigh. More recently, First introduced a competing 635 service - SLT retaliated by introducing journeys on the 600 between Wigan and Ashton-in-Makerfield, and offering a £1.00 flat fare. Following the withdrawal of First Greater Manchester services to Shevington, the SLT 600 was withdrawn in May 2008 and SLT is now the sole operator of services to Shevington and Appley Bridge.

On 30 September 2011, South Lancs Travel was sold to Julian Peddle and Crewe based D&G Bus. In January 2012, Strawberry merged with South Lancs Travel and moved its operations to SLT's depot in Atherton. Strawberry's founder Oliver Howarth became joint operations director of the enlarged company. However, he left soon after with Strawberry being acquired by D&G and Julian Peddle and merged into the main company and the name and livery being dropped in favour of the SLT brand.

=== Rotala ownership ===
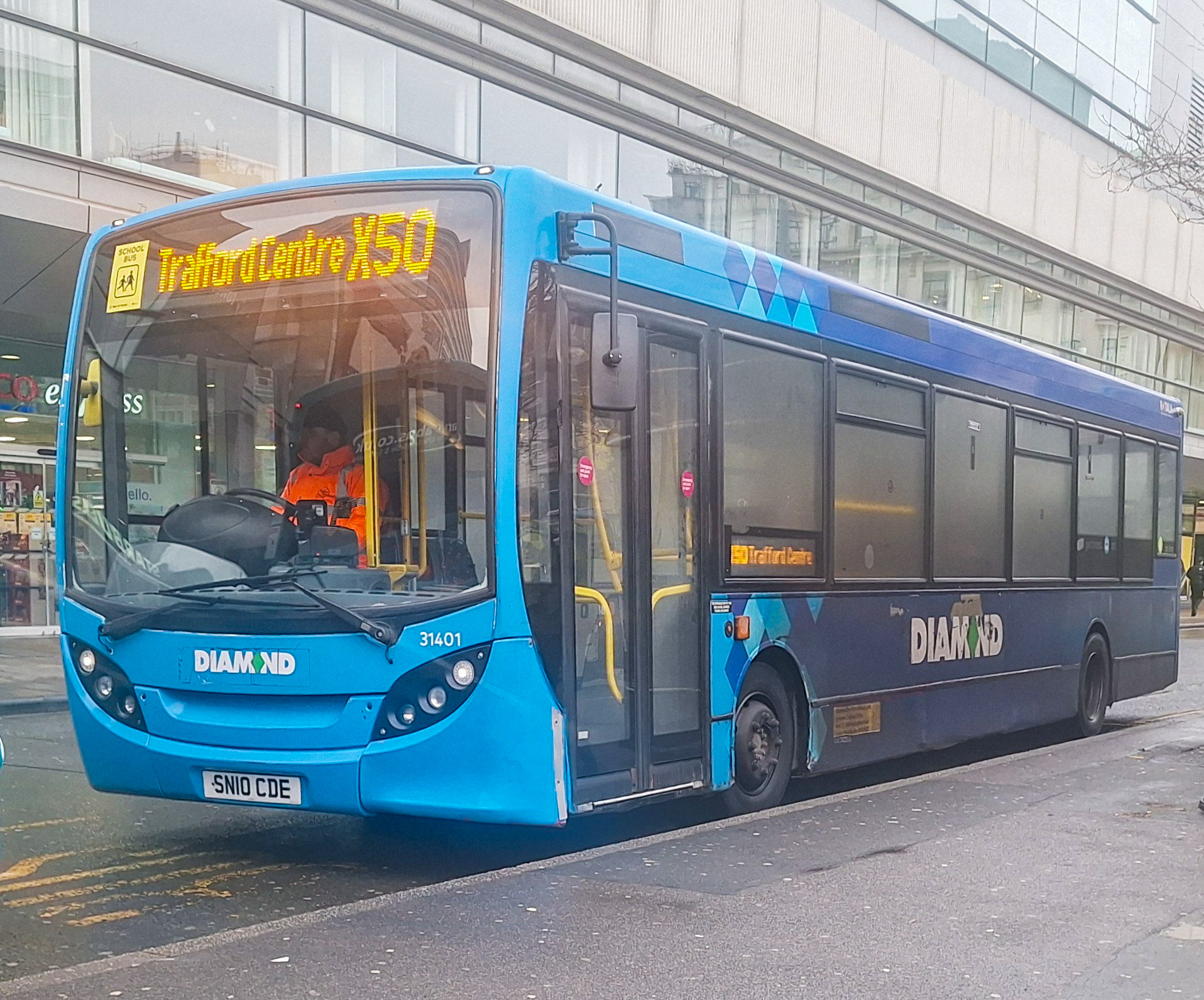
Diamond North West Enviro 200 at Piccadilly Gardens in January 2025

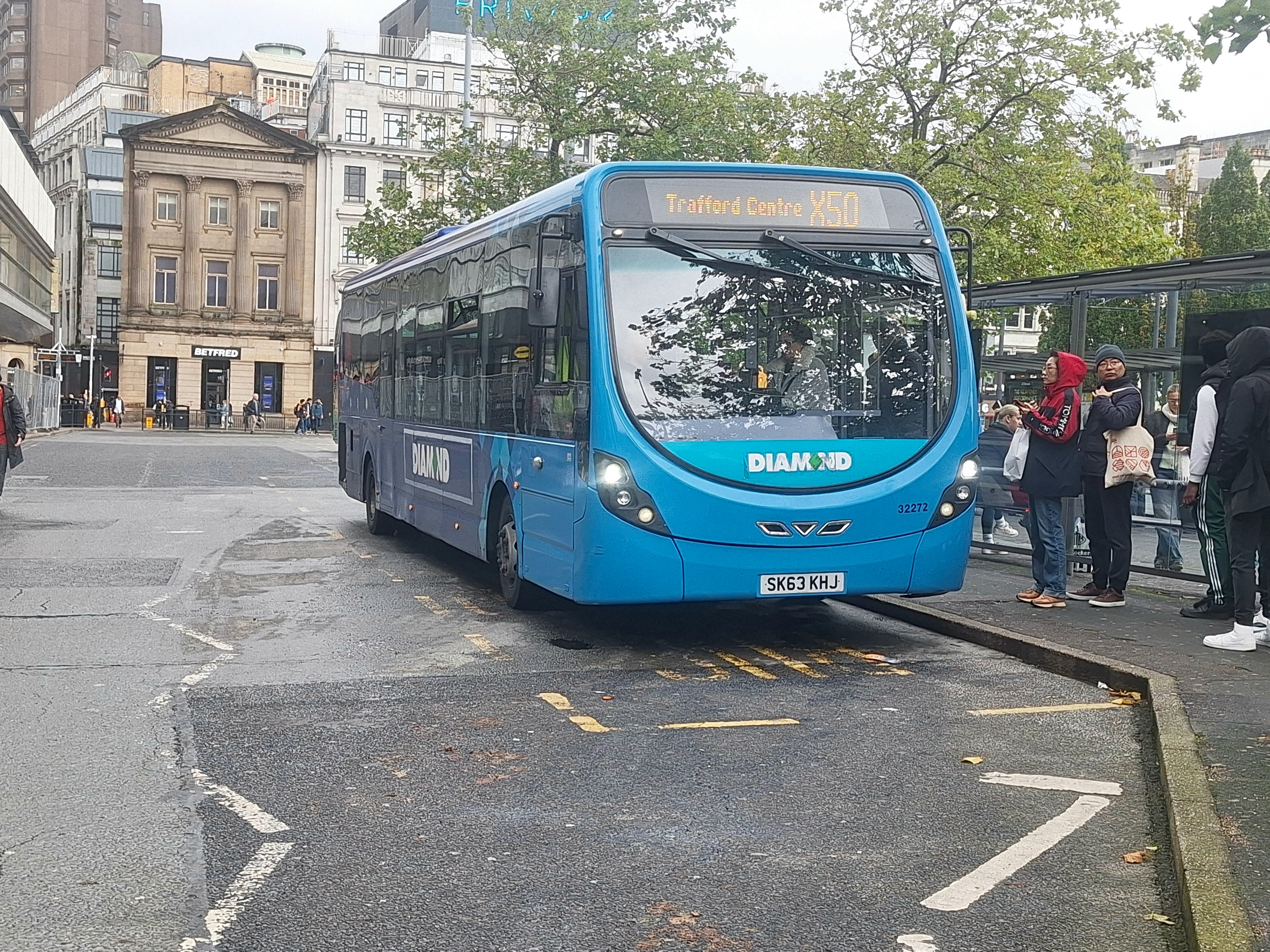
Diamond North West Wright StreetLite at Piccadilly Gardens, Manchester in October 2024

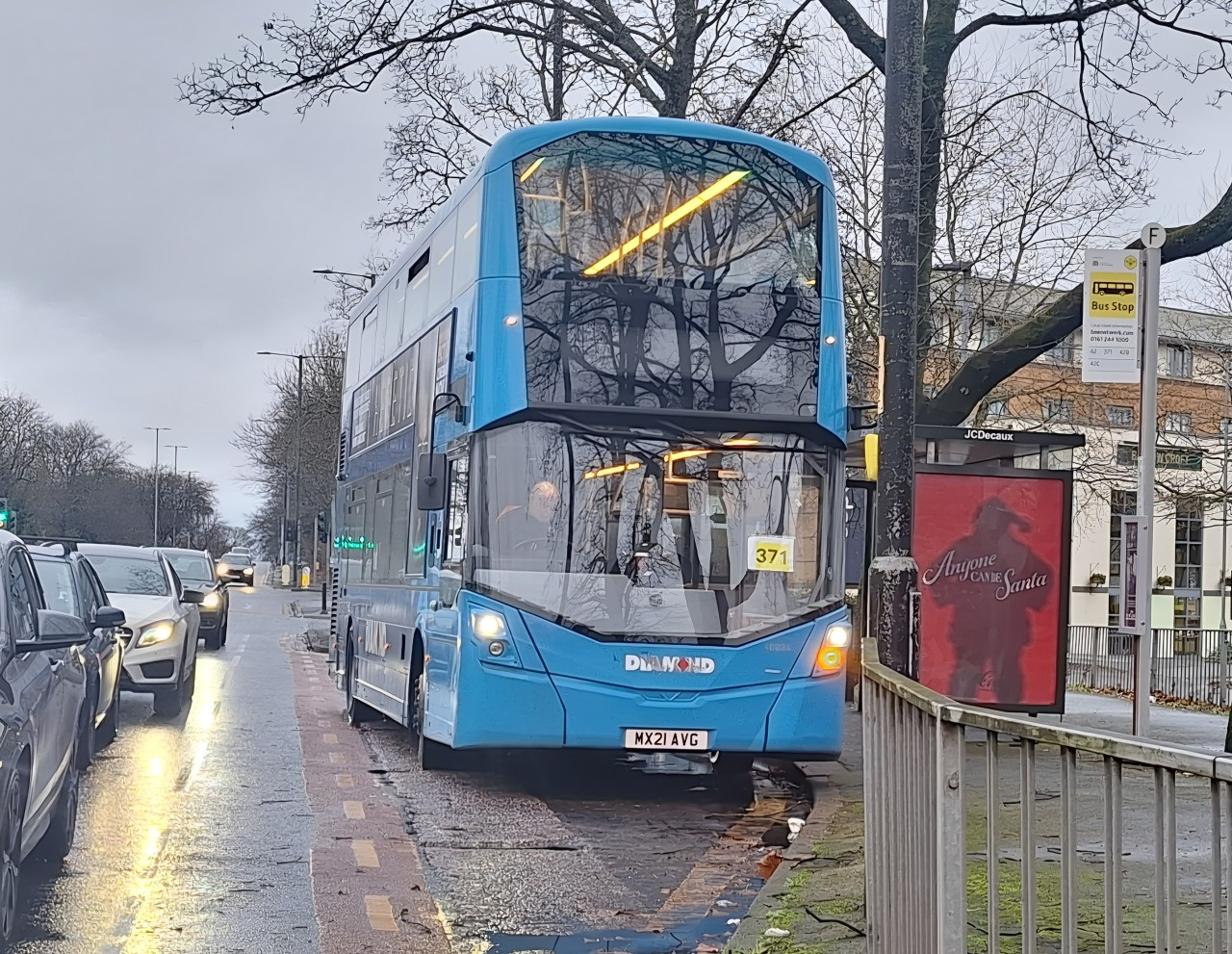
Wright StreetDeck in East Didsbury in December 2024

On 1 March 2015, South Lancs Travel was sold to Rotala and rebranded Diamond Bus North West.

On 1 September 2017, Rotala purchased the bus operations of Go Goodwins, resulting in the acquisition of 18 buses and the Eccles garage on Old Wellington Road, Eccles.

On 11 August 2019, First Greater Manchester's Bolton garage was taken over with 18 routes and 125 buses. Following the commencing of Tranche 1 of the Bee Network from 24 September 2023, the garage, with its vehicles was sold to Transport For Greater Manchester and it, under a Large Franchise including the depot and its routes was awarded to Go North West under Bee Network Tranche 1.

== Services ==
Diamond North West provides franchised Bee Network bus services on behalf of Transport for Greater Manchester within all tranches of Bee Network franchising.

These services are run from two garages, one in Eccles consisting of two yards, both acquired from Go Goodwins, which runs local services around Salford, Trafford, Stockport, Tameside and Oldham under all tranches of the Bee Network. These services include a large proportion of the network of Stotts Tours, and some of the network of Nexus Move, including the previously branded 'Saddleworth Rambler' service 356 alongside the 309/310, as well as route 385 from D&G Bus. All other services are ran from their depot in Bolton, an acquisition from Arriva, which operates services across Bolton, Bury, Wigan and Leigh under Tranche 1 of the Bee Network.

Diamond North West also operates School Bus Services under franchise from the Bee Network across Greater Manchester, including Stockport, Tameside and Trafford. These services are the only services that can use the operator's own livery within the Bee Network.

== Fleet ==
Bee Network branded Enviro200 MMC at Piccadilly Gardens in November 2026

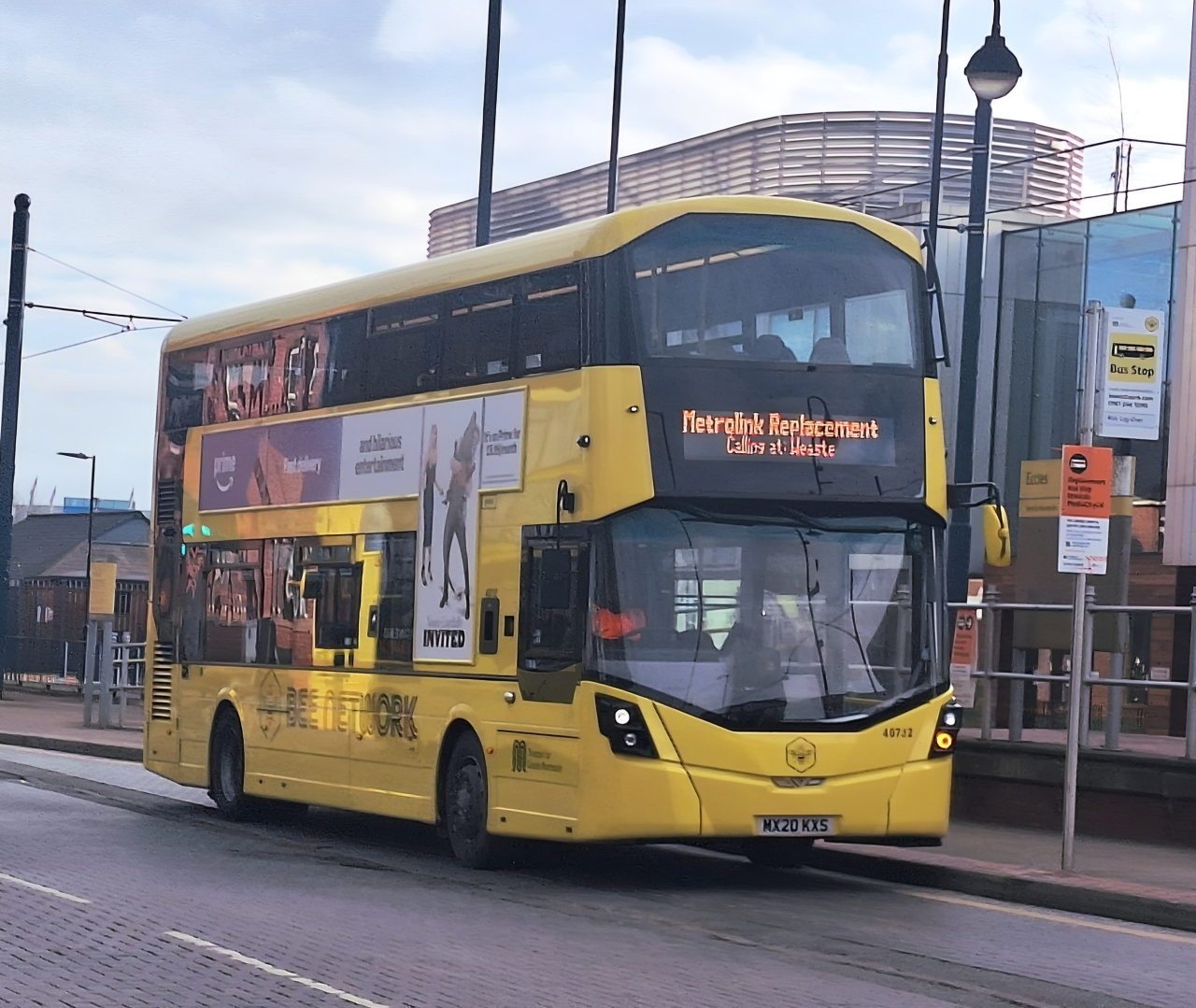
Bee Network branded Wright StreetDeck at Eccles Interchange in February 2025

As of November 2024, the Diamond North West fleet consisted of 100 buses. Most of these are branded for Bee Network services, with fleets of Alexander Dennis Enviro200 MMCs, Mellor Orion bodied Fiat Ducato and Mellor Strata bodied Mercedes Benz Sprinter Transfer minibuses additionally purchased new for these services by Transport for Greater Manchester.

Following the acquisition of First's Bolton garage, Diamond North West mainly standardised on the Wright StreetDeck double-decker bus, taking delivery of 128 StreetDecks throughout 2020 and 2021 and purchasing others second-hand, including 13 StreetDecks from a cancelled First Leeds order, to replace buses being leased from the FirstGroup. As of 2025, 101 of these StreetDecks, alongside the operations of Bolton garage, were transferred to Go North West to operate under the Bee Network from 24 September 2023, with one example converted from a diesel to an electric powertrain by Newpower. Some of these were also transferred to Wigan garage. 9 examples continue to operate with Diamond under the Bee Network with the remainder transferring to Rotala’s other subsidiaries including Diamond Bus (West Midlands) and Diamond Bus East Midlands.
