= Mellor Tucana =

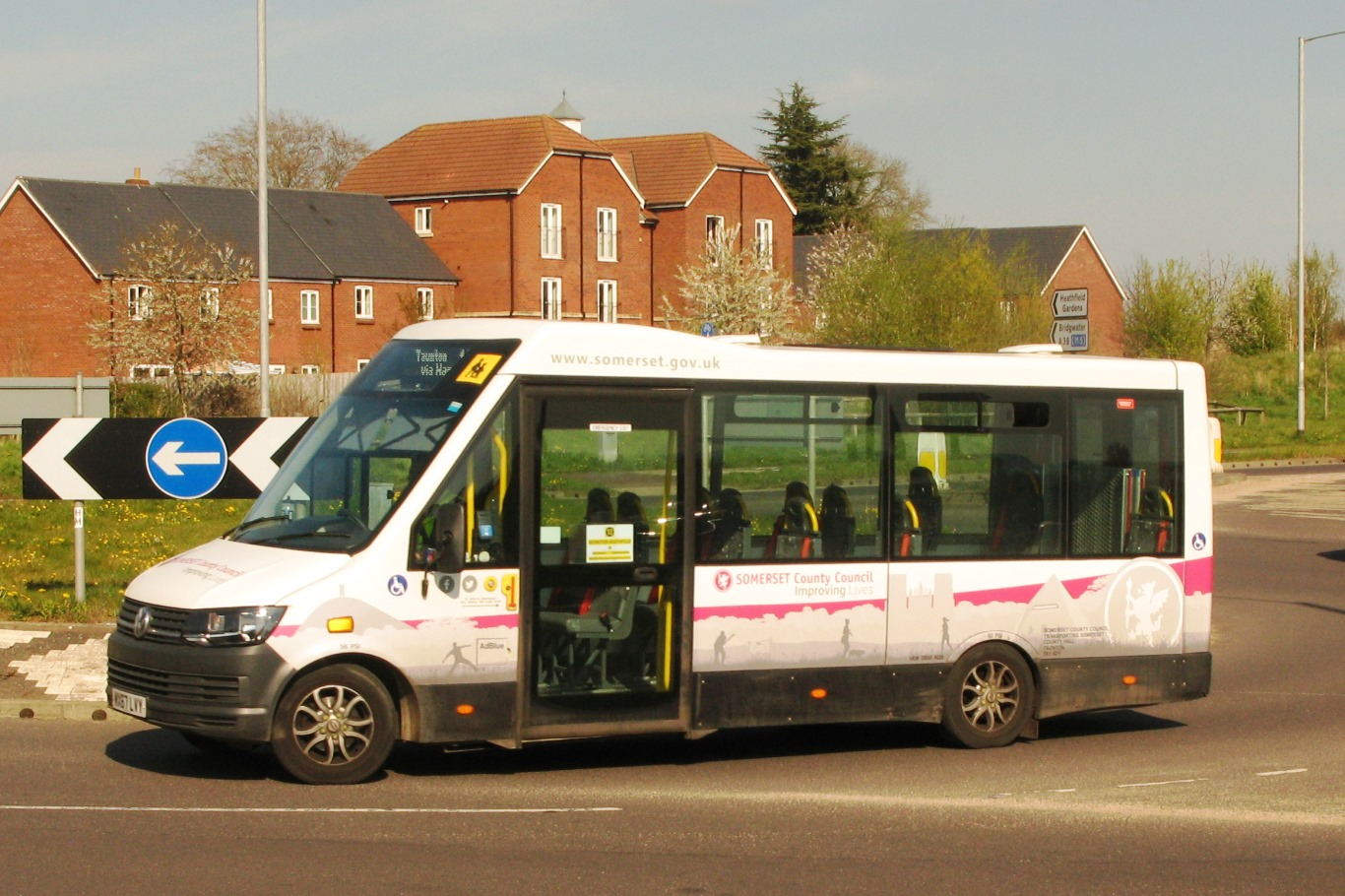
- Mellor Tucana II operated by Somerset CC

Overview
- Manufacturer: Bluebird Vehicles (2005-2014); Mellor Coachcraft (2014-)
- Production: 2005-2024

Body and chassis
- Doors: 1 side door or 2 door (1 side, 1 rear)
- Floor type: Low floor
- Chassis: Volkswagen Transporter T5/ T6

Powertrain
- Engine: 2.0-litre 4-cylinder Euro-6
- Capacity: 15 seats or 4 wheelchairs
- Power output: 140-150PS
- Transmission: 7 speed Direct-shift gearbox 6 speed manual

Dimensions
- Length: 6.83-7.01 metres
- Width: 2.08 metres
- Height: 2.41-2.57 metres
- Curb weight: 4.1 tonnes

Chronology
- Successor: Mellor Orion

The Mellor Tucana (previously known as the Bluebird Tucana) is a small wheelchair-accessible minibus manufactured by Mellor Coachcraft in England.

== Tucana ==
The Bluebird Tucana entered production in 2005 fitted to the Volkswagen Transporter T5 chassis. Over 650 were built, with Transport for London purchasing over 250 for use on Dial-a-Ride services. A number are used by Sheffield Community Transport in South Yorkshire.

Woodall Nicholson purchased the rights to the Tucana and transferred production from Scarborough to its Mellor Coachcraft subsidiary in Rochdale after Bluebird entered administration in 2014.

== Tucana II ==
In August 2016, Mellor Coachcraft launched the Mellor Tucana II based on the Volkswagen Transporter T6 chassis with the first delivered to Scarborough Dial-a-Ride.

== Gallery ==
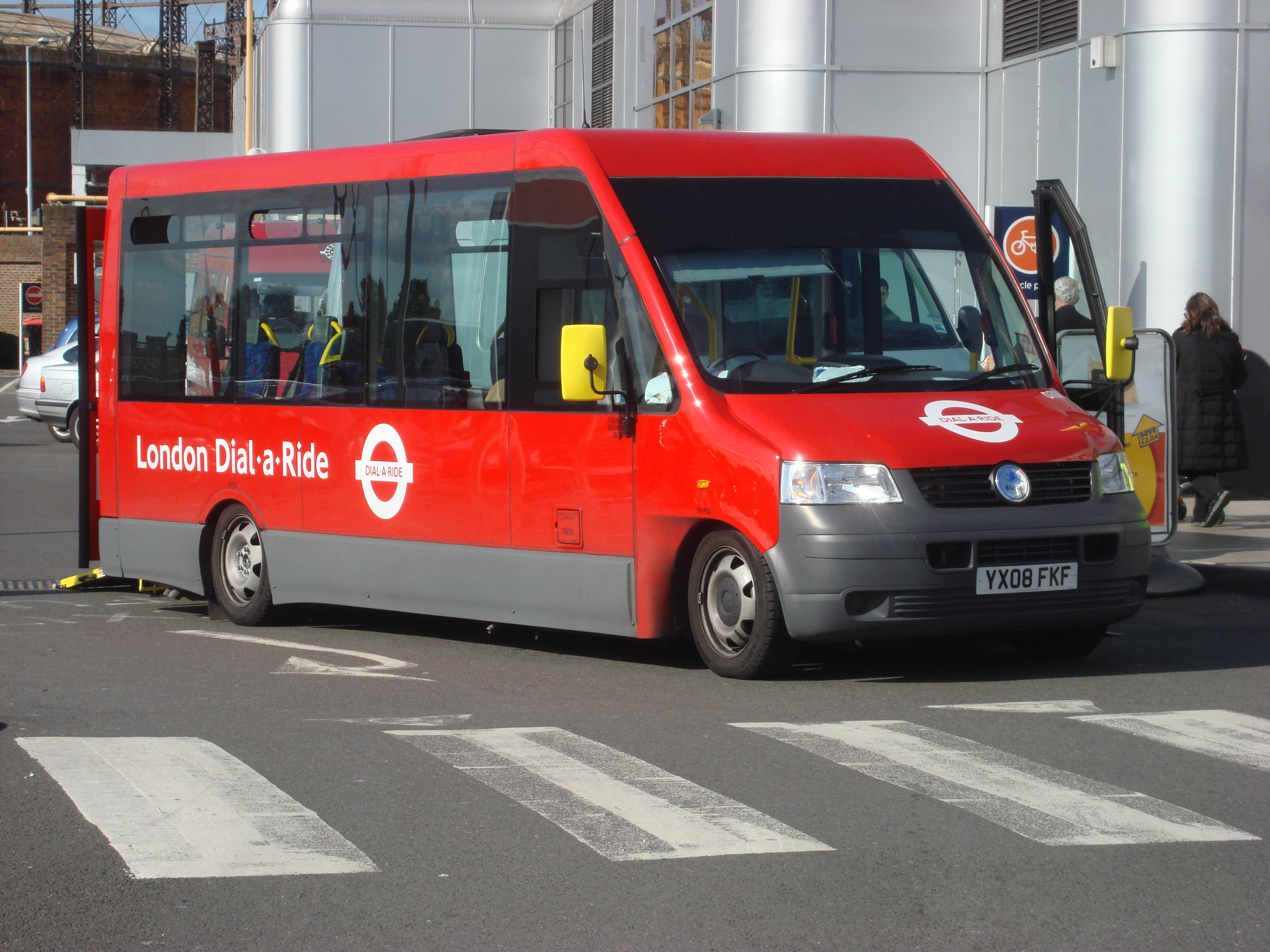
London Dial-a-Ride Bluebird Tucana

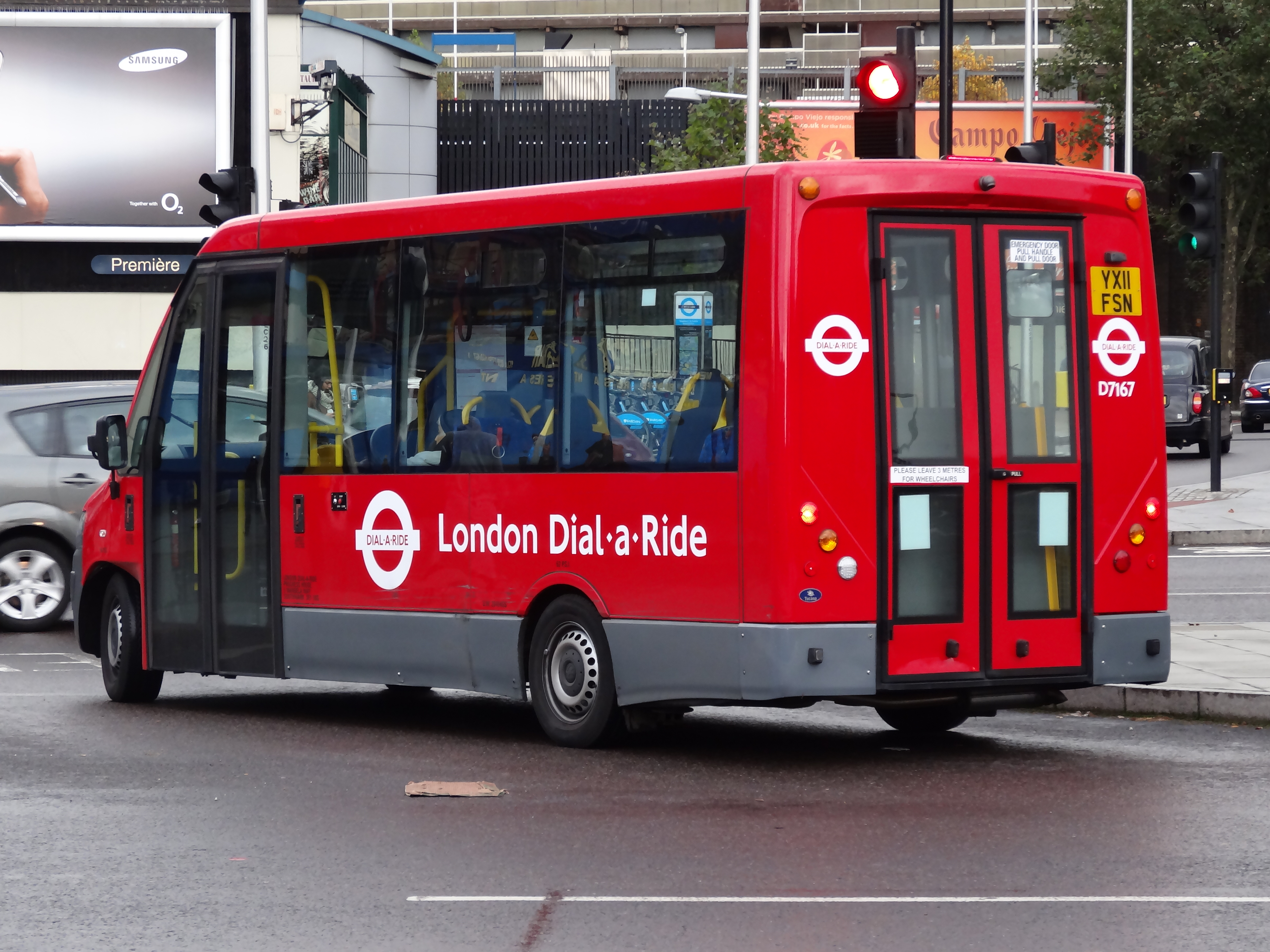
Rear of London Dial-a-Ride Bluebird Tucana

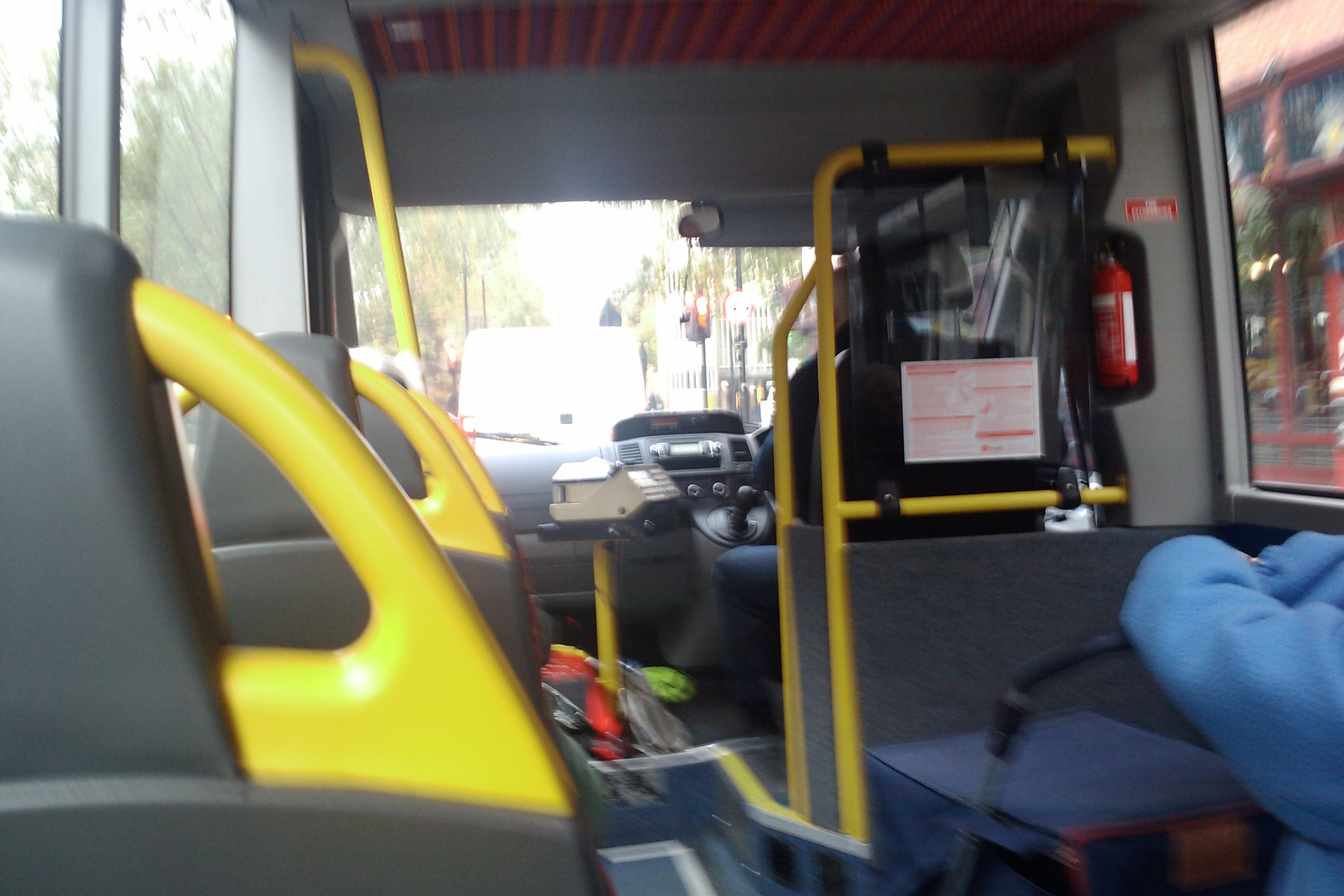
The interior of a Bluebird Tucana
