= Mellor Bus =

British bus manufacturer

- Company type: Private
- Industry: Bus building
- Founded: 1967; 59 years ago (initial company); 27 February 1992; 34 years ago (present company)
- Headquarters: Rochdale, Greater Manchester, England
- Key people: Guido Dumarey (Director)
- Products: Mini- and Midi-buses
- Revenue: ▲£1.15 million (2015/16)
- Parent: Woodall Nicholson Group
- Website: https://www.mellorbus.com/

Mellor Bus known simply as Mellor or Mellor Bus, is a British bus manufacturer based in Rochdale, Greater Manchester. Founded in the 1960s, Mellor has primarily produced bodywork for various different minibus chassis throughout its history. Mellor is owned by parent company, Woodall Nicholson Group, alongside Treka Bus.

== History ==
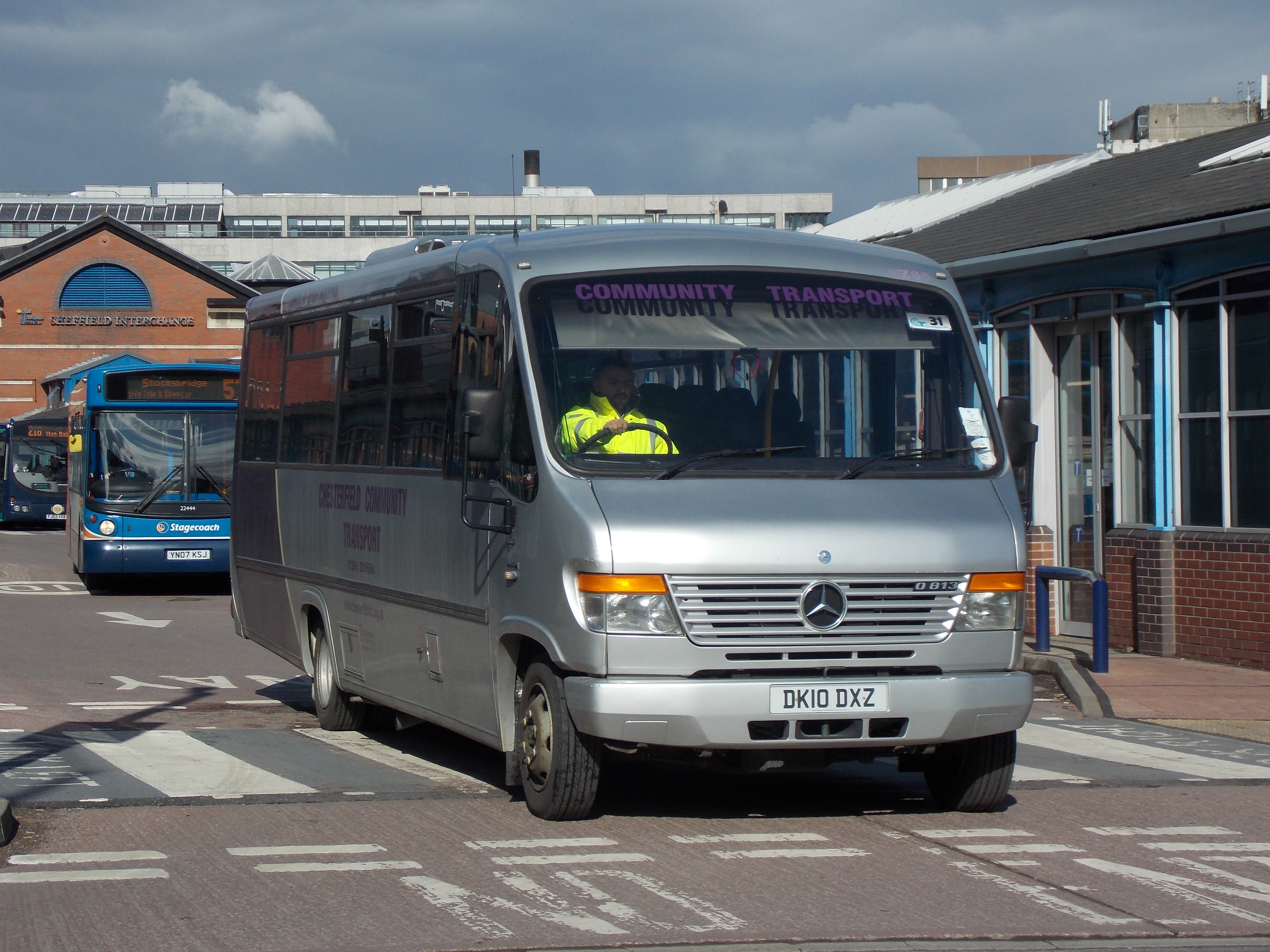
A Mellor-bodied Mercedes-Benz Vario operated by Chesterfield Community Transport

Mellor was founded in the 1960s by Tom Mellor with a factory in Rochdale, Greater Manchester. Initially, Mellor specialised in providing bodywork for commercial vehicles including ambulances, before later moving into minibus manufacturing. Following a period of growth spurred on by the move into the minibus market, Mellor moved into a new purpose-built factory in Miall Street, Rochdale which they still occupy today.

Throughout the 'minibus revolution' of the 1980s in the United Kingdom, Mellor provided bodies for a number of different chassis, with a large number of deliveries going to Transit Holdings and their various subsidiaries.

In 1989, the company was sold by Henlys Group to Plaxton. In February 1992, the company's assets were transferred to a new entity, Deckglade Limited, in preparation for a management buyout by the Woodall Nicholson Group that was completed in May 1992, with the company name reverting to Mellor Coachcraft in July 2003. Success was found in the late 1990s and early 2000s with a bodywork for the low-floor Iveco Daily chassis, with a capacity of between 16 and 25 passengers; fitted with an optional rear lift, the body was popular with the early access bus market. Later, bodywork was launched for the Fiat Ducato, Ford Transit and Mercedes-Benz T2, Vario and Sprinter chassis, with many minibuses being sold to local authorities in the access bus market.

Mellor purchased rival minibus manufacturer Bluebird Vehicles in July 2014, after the latter company had entered administration, taking over manufacture of their successful Fiat Ducato-based Orion and Volkswagen Transporter-based Tucana minibuses. Mellor later launched the updated Tucana II and an updated version of the Orion, sharing features with a number of Mellor's own products.

In 2016, Mellor launched the Mercedes-Benz Sprinter-based Strata minibus, with a capacity of up to 22 seated passengers. The Strata has sold well in the market of the United Kingdom's 'second minibus revolution' of the mid to late 2010s, winning orders from a number of operators including Arriva North West and Bus Vannin.

The Strata was followed by the Maxima on high-floor Iveco Daily chassis, aimed at local authorities for the access bus and community transport markets, with a capacity of up to eight wheelchairs or 30 seated passengers. In August 2017, Mellor signed a distributorship arrangement deal in Germany and Austria with E-Vade as part of plans to expand into the mainland European market.

On 1 November 2017, Mellor's owner Woodall Nicholson Holdings completed the purchase of the Villmount Group, which owns rival UK-based minibus manufacturer Treka Bus. Mellor and Treka Bus will continue to trade separately as Woodall Nicholson subsidiaries.

In 2024, Belgian industrial entrepreneur Guido Dumarey acquired the businesses of Coleman Milne, VCS Police, Mellor Bus, Treka Bus, Promech, and JM Engineering. These operations have since been consolidated under a new holding company, Woodall Nicholson, which continues the group's legacy as a specialist vehicle manufacturer in Europe.

Mellor secured a deal in 2024 with both First Manchester, and Stagecoach Manchester, for the Bee Network. 17 standard size Mellor Stratas were made for operation out of Rochdale depot, meanwhile Stagecoach using 4 Mellor Strata Ultra size with extra seats, for operation out of the Queens Road depot.

== Products ==
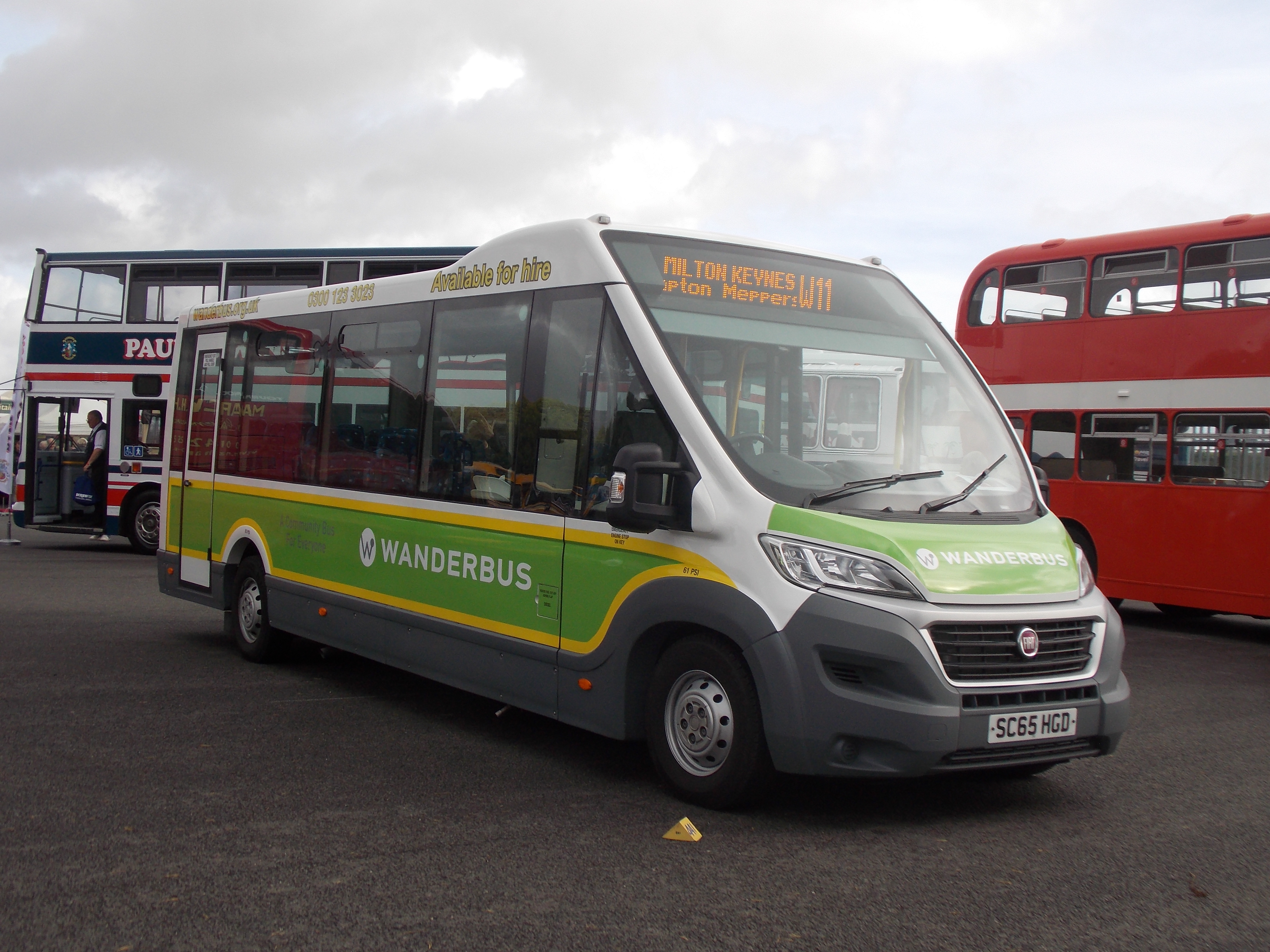
A 2016 Mellor Orion operated by Wanderbus, seen attending Showbus 2016

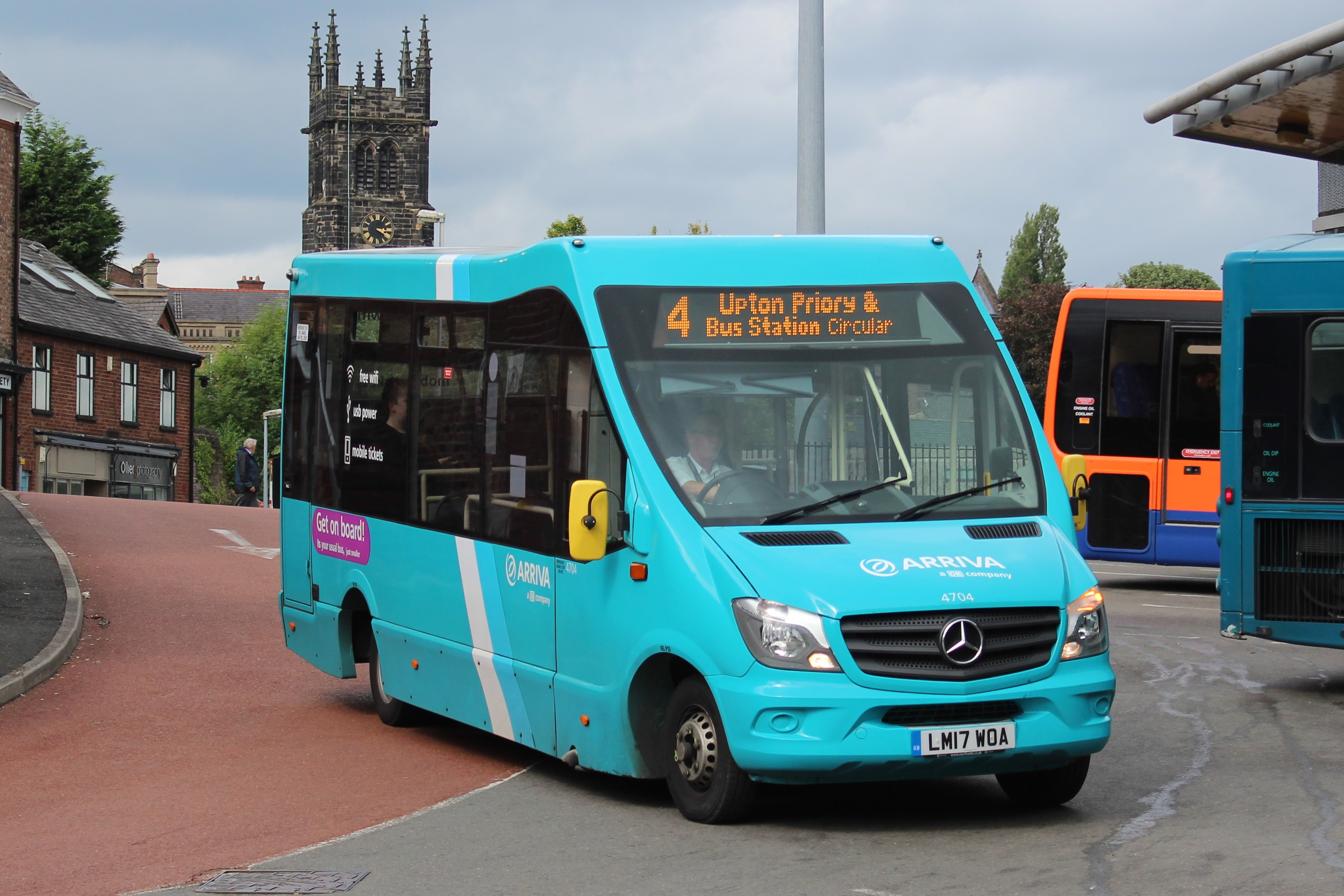
A 2017 Mellor Strata operated by Arriva North West

=== Current ===
- Maxima – high-floor, high-capacity minibus based on the Iveco Daily chassis
- Orion – low-floor minibus based on the Fiat Ducato chassis
  - Orion E – all-electric version of the Orion
  - Orion Lite – fitted with lighter CT Ultra Lite seating option
  - Orion Stage Carriage – aimed at the service bus market
  - Pico – eight-seater taxi version of the Orion
- Strata – low-floor minibus based on the Mercedes-Benz Sprinter chassis and aimed at the service bus market
  - Strata HF 16 – high-floor variant
  - Strata Plus
  - Strata Ultra

Additionally, Mellor also provide various custom-built access bus and community transport minibus bodies for mid-floor Fiat Ducato and high-floor Iveco Daily 50C17, 65C17 and 70C17 chassis, as well as van conversions for a variety of chassis including the Volkswagen Transporter.

=== Former ===
- Tucana – minibus based on the Volkswagen Transporter T5 chassis, acquired from the Bluebird Vehicles takeover
- Sigma – low-floor battery-electric bus range, available as a 7, 8, 9, 10, 11 or 12-metre vehicle.

In the past, Mellor have also produced bodywork for Ford Transit, Iveco Daily, LDV Convoy, Mercedes-Benz T2, Mercedes-Benz Vario and Renault 50 chassis; however, early bodies were not given names.
