= Mellor Maxima =

Minibus bodywork on an Iveco chassis

Overview
- Manufacturer: Mellor Coachcraft
- Production: 2016–
- Assembly: Rochdale, Greater Manchester

Body and chassis
- Class: Single-decker bus
- Layout: Front-engine, front-wheel drive
- Doors: 1
- Floor type: Step-entrance
- Chassis: Iveco Daily

Powertrain
- Engine: 170 bhp (130 kW), 3.0-litre Iveco diesel
- Transmission: 8-speed ZF fully automatic 6-speed Iveco manual

Dimensions
- Wheelbase: 4.75 m (15.6 ft)
- Length: 8.54 m (28.0 ft)
- Height: 2.84 m (9.3 ft)
- Kerb weight: 7,200 kg (7.2 t), GVW

The Mellor Maxima is a step-entrance minibus bodywork produced by Mellor Coachcraft on Iveco Daily chassis since 2016. With a capacity of up to 31 passenger seats, eight wheelchair bays or a combination of both, the Maxima is aimed at local authorities providing accessible transport and community transport.

The Maxima was launched in 2016, in response to the discontinuation of the popular Mercedes-Benz Vario chassis and its minibus variants in the United Kingdom, such as the Plaxton Beaver. Intended to fill the same market, the Maxima features a flat floor interior which is accessed by a stepped entry at the front or a rear wheelchair lift. The Maxima was initially only available on diesel Iveco Daily chassis; in 2021, a fully-electric variant known as the Mellor Maxima E23 was announced, but has not yet entered production. The Maxima E23 will feature a maximum passenger capacity of 23 seated, with a range of 99 miles (160 km) from an 80 kWh battery pack.

The Maxima has seen strong sales with local councils in the United Kingdom since its introduction, with customers including Dumfries and Galloway Council and Hackney London Borough Council.
