= Mellor Orion =

Minibus bodywork on a Fiat chassis

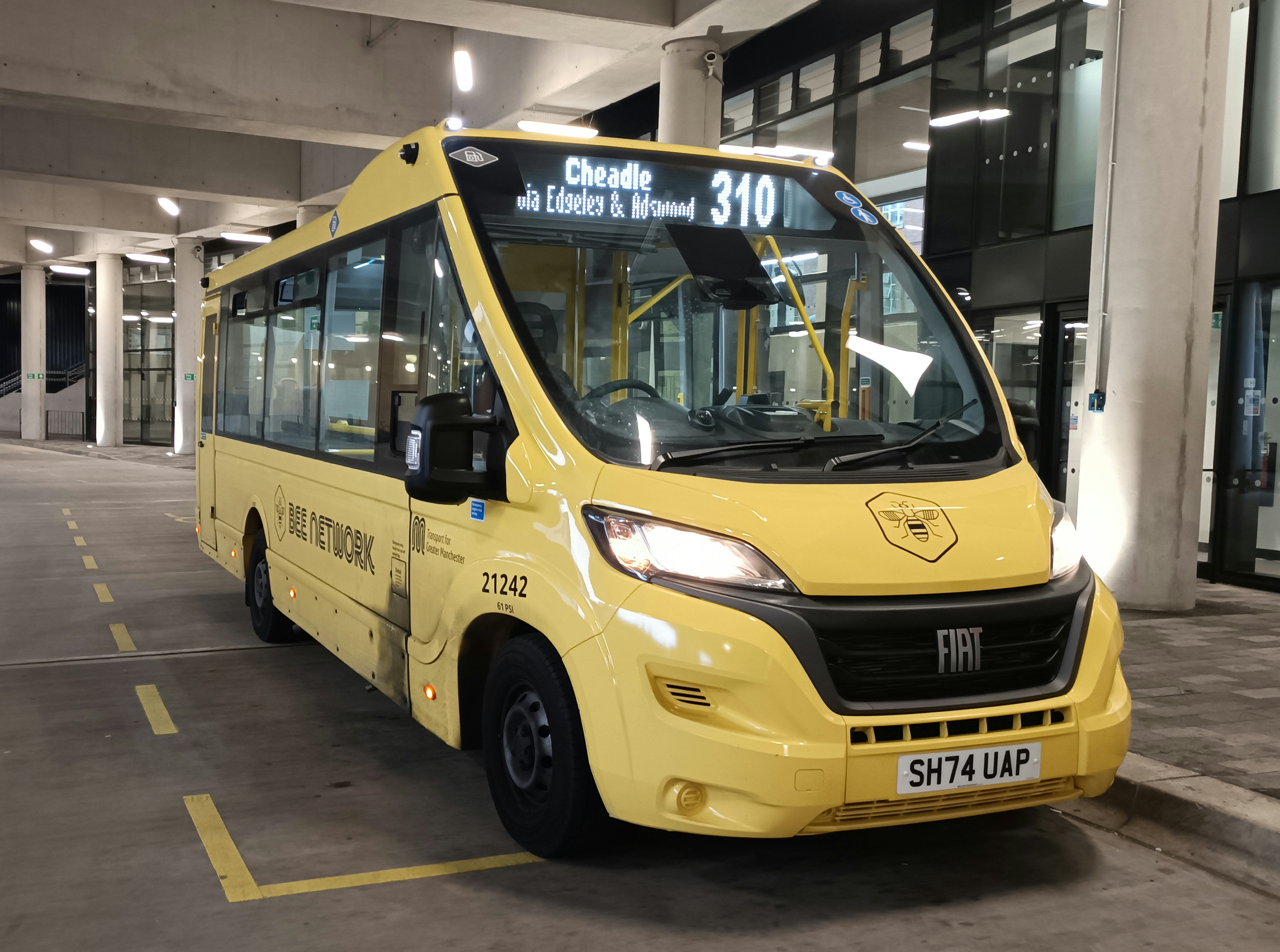
- A 2025 Mellor Orion operated by Diamond North West

Overview
- Manufacturer: Bluebird Vehicles (2011–2014); Mellor Coachcraft (2014–)
- Production: 2011–
- Assembly: Scarborough, North Yorkshire; Rochdale, Greater Manchester

Body and chassis
- Class: Single-decker bus
- Layout: Front-engine, front-wheel drive
- Doors: 1
- Floor type: Low-floor
- Chassis: Fiat Ducato Peugeot Boxer (2013)

Powertrain
- Engine: 180 bhp (130 kW) Iveco F1AE3481E diesel
- Electric motor: 1x 96 kW Mellor motor (Orion E)
- Capacity: 192 kWh (Orion E)
- Transmission: 8-speed fully automatic 6-speed manual 7.3:1 ratio E-Gear (Orion E)
- Battery: 2x 96kWh lithium–iron phosphate packs (Orion E)
- Electric range: 100 mi (160 km) (Orion E)
- Plug-in charging: 400 volts AC, 32 amps (4.25 hours to full charge) (Orion E)

Dimensions
- Wheelbase: 4.890 m (16.04 ft)
- Length: 7.497 to 7.797 m (24.60 to 25.58 ft)
- Width: 2.200 m (7.22 ft)
- Height: 2.645 m (8.68 ft)
- Kerb weight: 5,000 kg (5.0 t), GVW

The Mellor Orion (previously known as the Bluebird Orion) is a minibus body manufactured on the Fiat Ducato chassis since 2011. It was introduced by Bluebird Vehicles and since 2014 has been built by Mellor Coachcraft. Several variants are produced, including the long-wheelbase Orion Plus and the fully electric Orion E. In 2021, Mellor launched an updated version known as the Orion Evolution.

An eight-seater private hire taxi variant, known as the Mellor Pico, was launched in 2019 on short-wheelbase Ducato chassis.

== Operators ==
=== Orion ===
The Mellor Orion has proven popular with local councils in providing accessible transport, home-to-school transport and demand-responsive or low-demand rural services. Dorset County Council, took delivery of 39 Orions between 2016 and 2018 in a renewal of their minibus fleet. Other customers include Nottinghamshire County Council (11 Orions), Durham County Council (7) and Edinburgh City Council (12).

The Orion has also been offered to foreign markets. In early 2014, an Orion Plus was exported to Australia and tested by several operators.

=== Orion E ===
The first production Orion E entered service in 2019 with the National Galleries of Scotland on a shuttle service between its three sites. Seven Orion Es were delivered to First West Yorkshire in Leeds in 2021 for the new Flexibus East Leeds demand-responsive transport service. Cheshire West and Chester Council took delivery of an Orion E in 2022 to join their existing fleet of diesel Orions, marking the council's first investment in electric buses. Other customers include Nottingham City Council, who are evaluating a single Orion E alongside other electric vehicles as part of their Project EVE.

=== Pico ===
The Mellor Pico was launched at the Busworld exposition in Brussels in October 2019. Aimed at the taxi and demand-responsive market, the Pico is built on the shortest wheelbase Fiat Ducato chassis and contains up to eight passenger seats, competing with contemporary taxis such as the LEVC TX.
