= Woodlands Road tram stop =

Former Manchester Metrolink tram stop

Woodlands Road
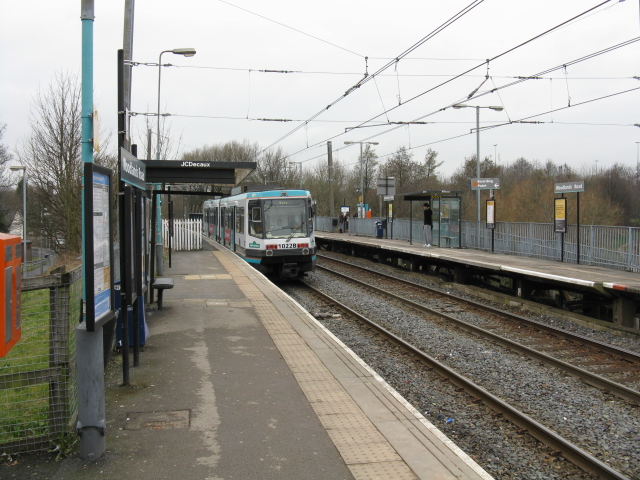
- Woodlands Road tram stop in 2009

General information
- Location: Cheetham Hill, Manchester; England
- Coordinates: 53.5081°N 2.2326°W
- Grid reference: SD846013
- System: Manchester Metrolink
- Operator: RATP Dev
- Transit authority: Transport for Greater Manchester
- Line: Bury Line
- Platforms: 2

Construction
- Structure type: Embankment
- Accessible: Yes

Other information
- Status: Disused, demolished
- Station code: -
- Fare zone: C

History
- Opened: 6 April 1992 (Metrolink)
- Closed: 16 December 2013 (Metrolink)
- Former names: Woodlands Road Halt
- Original company: Lancashire and Yorkshire Railway
- Pre-grouping: Lancashire and Yorkshire Railway
- Post-grouping: London, Midland and Scottish Railway; British Rail

Key dates
- 15 July 1991: Closed to British Rail
- 6 April 1992: Opened to Metrolink
- 13 December 2013: Last tram
- 16 December 2013: Closed to Metrolink
Route map
Location

Woodlands Road was a Manchester Metrolink tram stop in Cheetham Hill, Manchester. It was on the Bury Line and was in the now defunct fare zone C before it closed. This stop was opened to Metrolink on 6 April 1992, after previously serving as a railway station from 1879 to 1991. After the final trams ran and stopped at the station on 13 December 2013, it was closed to the public on 16 December 2013. This stop had step-free access.

This tram stop was the closest to the Museum of Transport on Boyle Street, and was noted as such on the official network map between 2003 and 2008. Abraham Moss and Queens Road tram stops were opened nearby in 2011 and 2013 respectively, serving areas such as Abraham Moss Centre, Manchester Fort, and Collyhurst (earmarked for new developments). The opening of Abraham Moss just 400 metres away from Woodlands Road led to the closure of the latter in 2013.

== History ==
=== Railway station ===
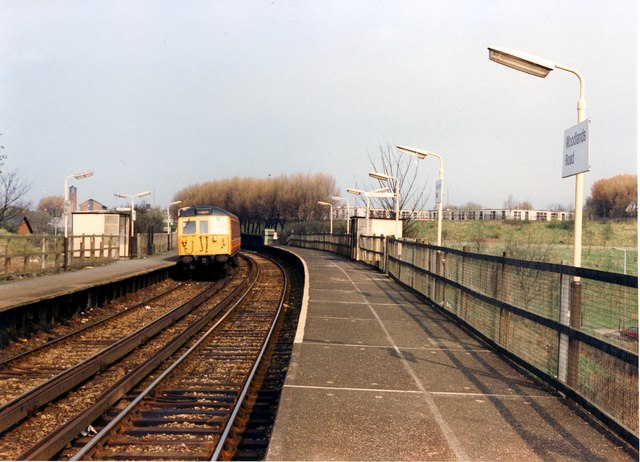
Woodlands Road railway station in 1989

The original railway line was opened in 1879 by the Lancashire and Yorkshire Railway between Manchester Victoria and Radcliffe, which connected to an existing line from Clifton Junction through to Radcliffe and Bury. Woodlands Road was added to the line on 3 March 1913, in an attempt to fend off growing electric tramway competition in the Cheetham Hill area. The site is near the vanished junction of a former branch line to chemical works, the works located just east of where North Manchester General Hospital stands today by the River Irk.

The last trains ran through Woodlands Road railway station on 13 July 1991. No trains ran on Sunday (14 July), and it was officially closed on 15 July 1991 along with the section of the Manchester-Bury rail line between Manchester Victoria and Crumpsall via Collyhurst Tunnel. Woodlands Road was the only intermediate station on this section; Manchester Victoria and Crumpsall remained open, the latter until August 1991.

A road nearby is named Woodhalt Road, probably taken from Woodlands Road's original status as a halt station, as the street was built sometime in the 1930s or 1940s after the rail station opened.

=== Metrolink stop ===
Woodlands Road reopened to Metrolink trams on 6 April 1992 on the Bury Line, the first operational section of the Metrolink. All services called at all stations at all times; trams stopped at Woodlands Road frequently. The British Rail platforms were kept for Metrolink as they were, however only around 60 metres of the platform was maintained, and later the rest of the abandoned platform would be fenced off.

=== Closure to Metrolink ===
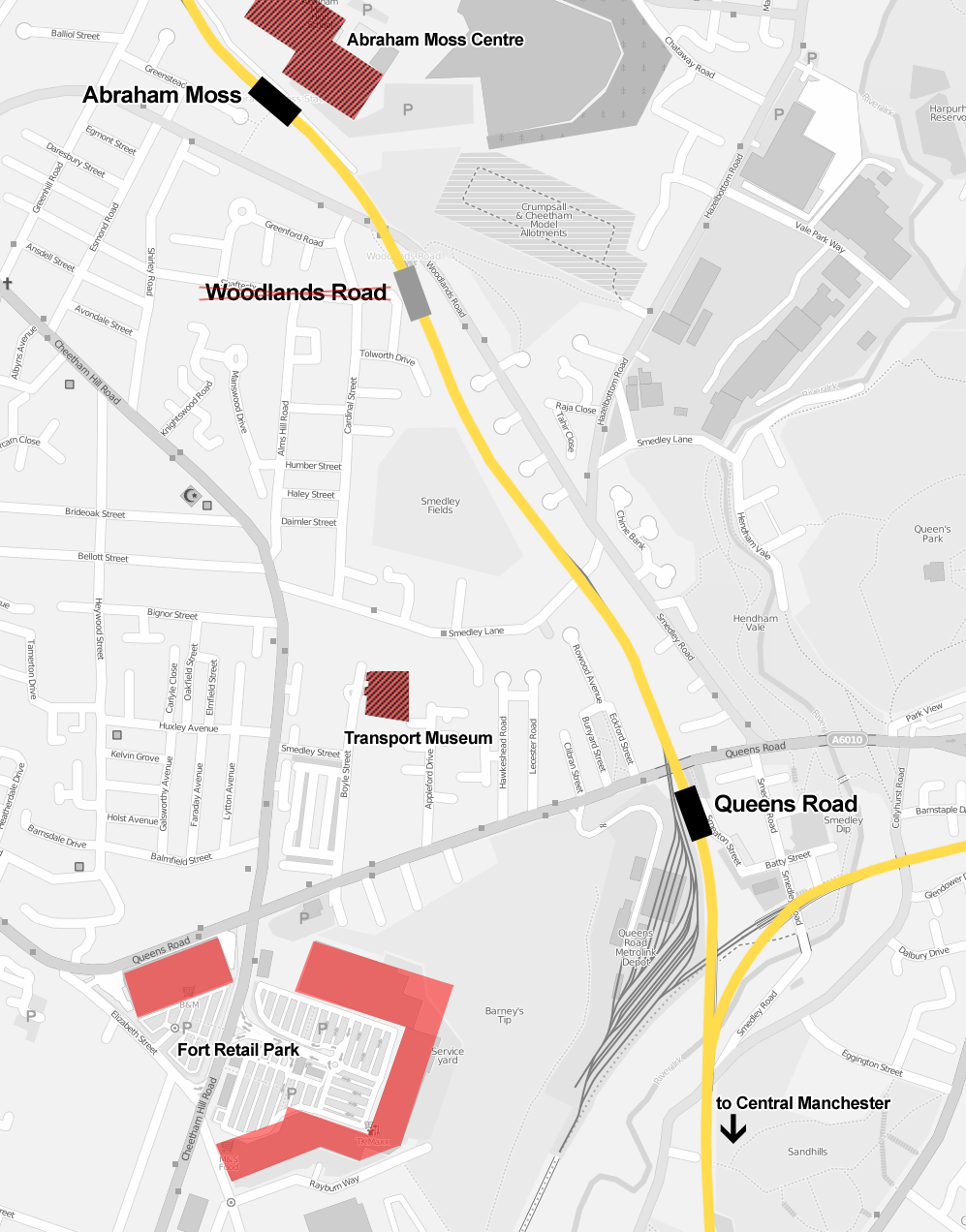
Map showing the developments to the Metrolink network; two new tram stops opened at Abraham Moss and Queens Road while Woodlands Road closed

Woodlands Road faced low patronage and had reported issues with security and crime, and issues with local station access.

The UK Government announced that £4 million from the Community Infrastructure Fund was awarded to build two new stops on the Bury Line. This was part of £30 million allocated to transport projects to support thousands of extra homes being built across the country over the coming months. The Chairman of the GMITA at the time, Councillor Keith Whitmore, stated that the funding would help realise a long-held ambition to open new Metrolink stops in the area.

Abraham Moss stop opened on 18 April 2011, situated close to the Abraham Moss Centre, the library and leisure centre and the City College Manchester. It is approximately 350 metres (380 yd) from Woodlands Road as the crow flies. Queens Road stop opened on 16 December 2013 (just after Woodlands Road closed), providing a closer stop to the Museum of Transport. The site is close to the Queens Road tram depot. Queens Road used to be a staff halt only but was converted to a passenger stop.

The opening of Abraham Moss nearby would mean the closure of Woodlands Road. This was an effective relocation of the tram stop serving the area. When Abraham Moss opened in 2011, services at Woodlands Road only stopped between 10:00-16:00 on weekdays only, and trams displayed "via Woodlands Road" along with the initial destination if they were stopping. At other times, they passed through the station without stopping. This reduction of service to Woodlands Road was opposed by a small campaign in 2013, who wanted both Abraham Moss and Woodlands Road to remain open. This group went to the outbound (Bury) platform on 2 March 2013 to celebrate 100 years of Woodlands Road station whilst also campaigning for the tram stop to remain open.

The final trams stopped at Woodlands Road on 13 December 2013. The final tram to stop was fleet no. 3012/3027 on an inbound service to Altrincham at 15:58 GMT. This service was running on time, however there was another scheduled service outbound to Bury (fleet no. 3011) which was also meant to call at 15:58 on the opposite platform, but ended up skipping the station. Since trams were only allowed to stop at Woodlands Road between 10am and 4pm on Monday-Friday only, the 15:58 Bury service being around ~4 minutes late might have meant that timetabled stop at Woodlands Road was affected and altered because of the tram's lateness, but this is not certain.

The tram stop was demolished in October 2014 at a cost of £300k. Some footpaths that led to the station's platforms can still be seen in places today. About 5 metres (16 ft) of the Bury platform is still standing at the site.

== Services ==
Following 18 April 2011, trams only stopped at Woodlands Road between 10am and 4pm, Monday-Friday, with no weekend or evening service. This was due to the opening of Abraham Moss tram stop nearby, also on the Bury Line. At all other times, trams passed through the station without stopping.

Woodlands Road's services on 13 December 2013 (final day in service) were as follows, with every route operating every 12 minutes in each direction:

Preceding station	Manchester Metrolink	Following station
Former services
Victoria towards Altrincham	Altrincham–Bury (peak only)	Abraham Moss towards Bury
Victoria towards Ashton-under-Lyne	Bury – Ashton-under-Lyne	Abraham Moss towards Bury

== Transport connections ==
=== Bus ===
Woodlands Road has bus stops near to it but were not in use for a number of years before Woodlands Road's closure to Metrolink, and remain out of use today. The site is closest to Bee Network bus routes 41, 52, 53, 94, and 151 on Crescent Road to the north, and 56 and 156 on Hazelbottom Road to the south.

=== Rail ===
This tram stop is not connected to or near to any railway stations, but the nearest is Manchester Victoria, approximately 2 miles (3.2 km) away walking.

== See also ==
- Abraham Moss tram stop
