= Queens Road tram stop =

Manchester Metrolink tram stop

Queens Road
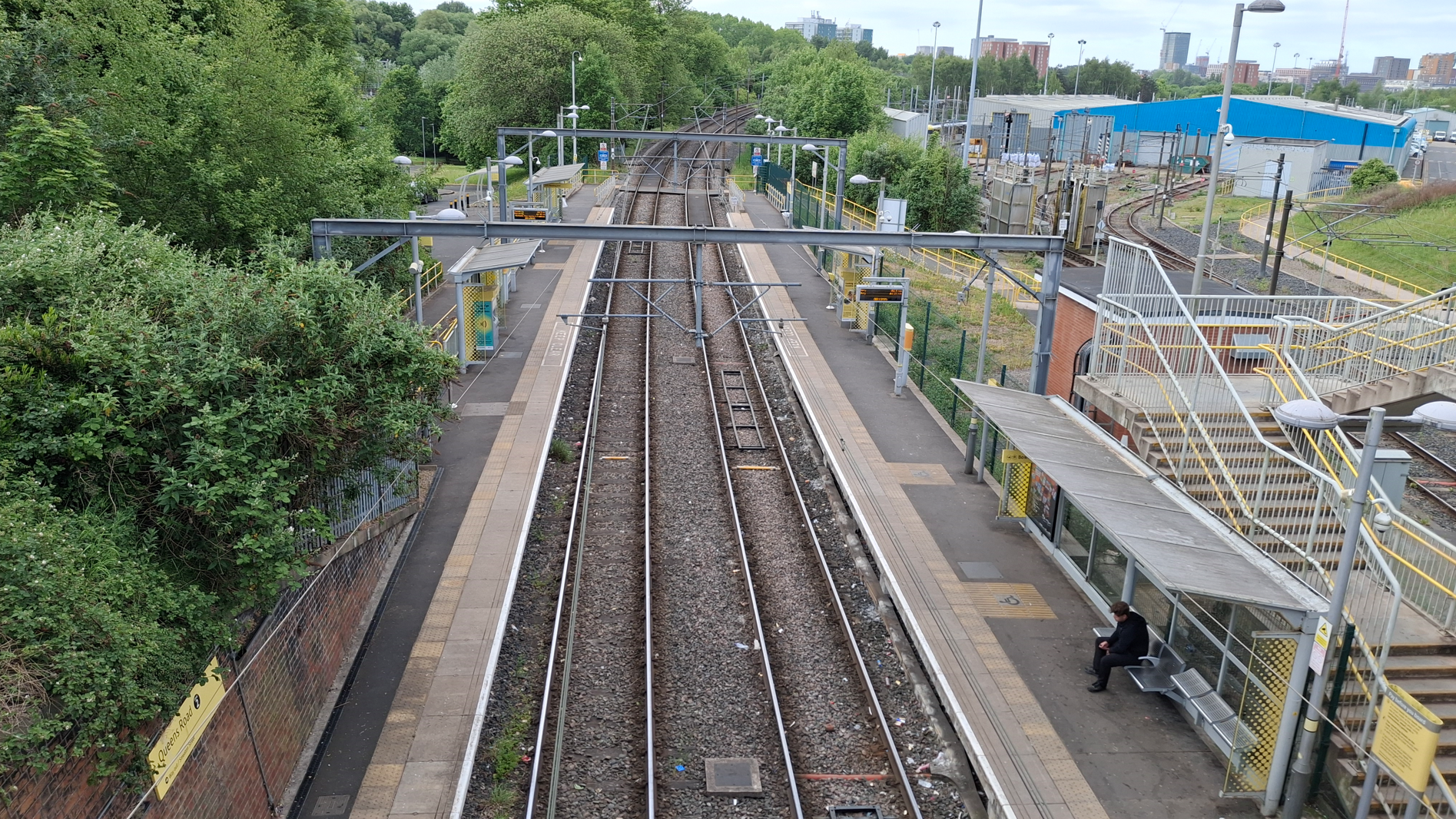
- View of Queens Road tram stop in May 2025.

General information
- Location: Smedley, Manchester; England
- Coordinates: 53.50167°N 2.22664°W
- Grid reference: SD850005
- System: Manchester Metrolink
- Operator: KeolisAmey
- Transit authority: Transport for Greater Manchester
- Line: Bury Line
- Platforms: 2
- Tram routes

Construction
- Structure type: Below-grade
- Accessible: Yes

Other information
- Status: In operation
- Station code: QNS
- Fare zone: 2
- Website: Queens Road tram stop

History
- Opened: 16 December 2013; 12 years ago
- Former names: Queens Road Halt

Key dates
- 6 April 1992: Opened as staff halt
- 16 September 2013: Construction work began
- 16 December 2013: Opened as tram stop

Passengers
- 2019/20: ▲0.357 million
- 2020/21: ▼65,000
- 2021/22: ▲0.142 million
- 2022/23: ▲0.234 million
- 2023/24: ▲0.257 million
Route map
Location

Queens Road is a Manchester Metrolink tram stop in Smedley, Manchester, close to the border with Cheetham Hill, another suburb. It is on the Bury Line and in fare zone 2. This stop was opened on 16 December 2013 and it has step-free access.

Queens Road replaced Woodlands Road, which had ceased operations at the end of service the previous day. The stop is located below-grade, the platforms perpendicular to the Queens Road road bridge. It is connected to Queens Road Depot, the original depot for the Metrolink, and is also near to the Museum of Transport on Boyle Street, Manchester Fort retail park, and is adjacent to the Irish World Heritage Centre.

== History ==
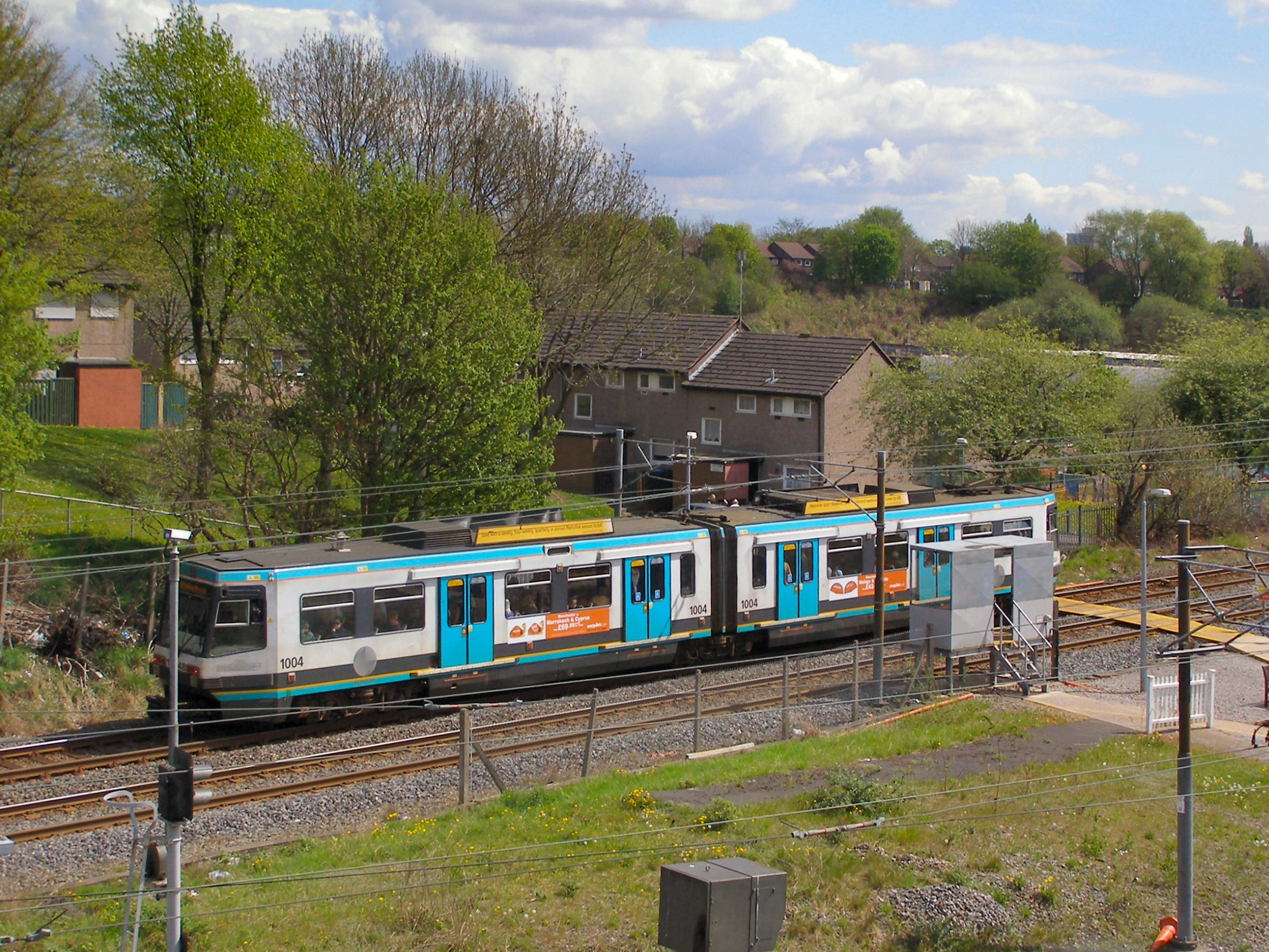
Site of Queens Road tram stop when it was a staff halt.

Beginning 6 April 1992, when the Bury Line was first opened to Metrolink, Queens Road was a staff halt and was not open to the public. Its only features were two approximately 5-metre long platforms with a shelter, stairs to each for access, and a pedestrian crossing. Flexibility may have been given in the schedule to allow for trams to stop at the halt.

Over time, there was a need to upgrade local access. A GMITA report from May 2010 discussed the idea to close Woodlands Road stop and open replacements at Queens Road and Abraham Moss. In October 2010, Abraham Moss would begin construction, and two months later a public consultation was held on the subject of closing Woodlands Road.

In February 2013, after confirmation of planning permission for Queens Road, it was confirmed that Woodlands Road would close. In September 2013, works began at the site to transform Queens Road staff halt to a tram stop for passenger service. In December 2013, works were finished. Queens Road opened to passengers on 16 December 2013, and Woodlands Road had ceased operations by the beginning of service on this day.

== Layout ==
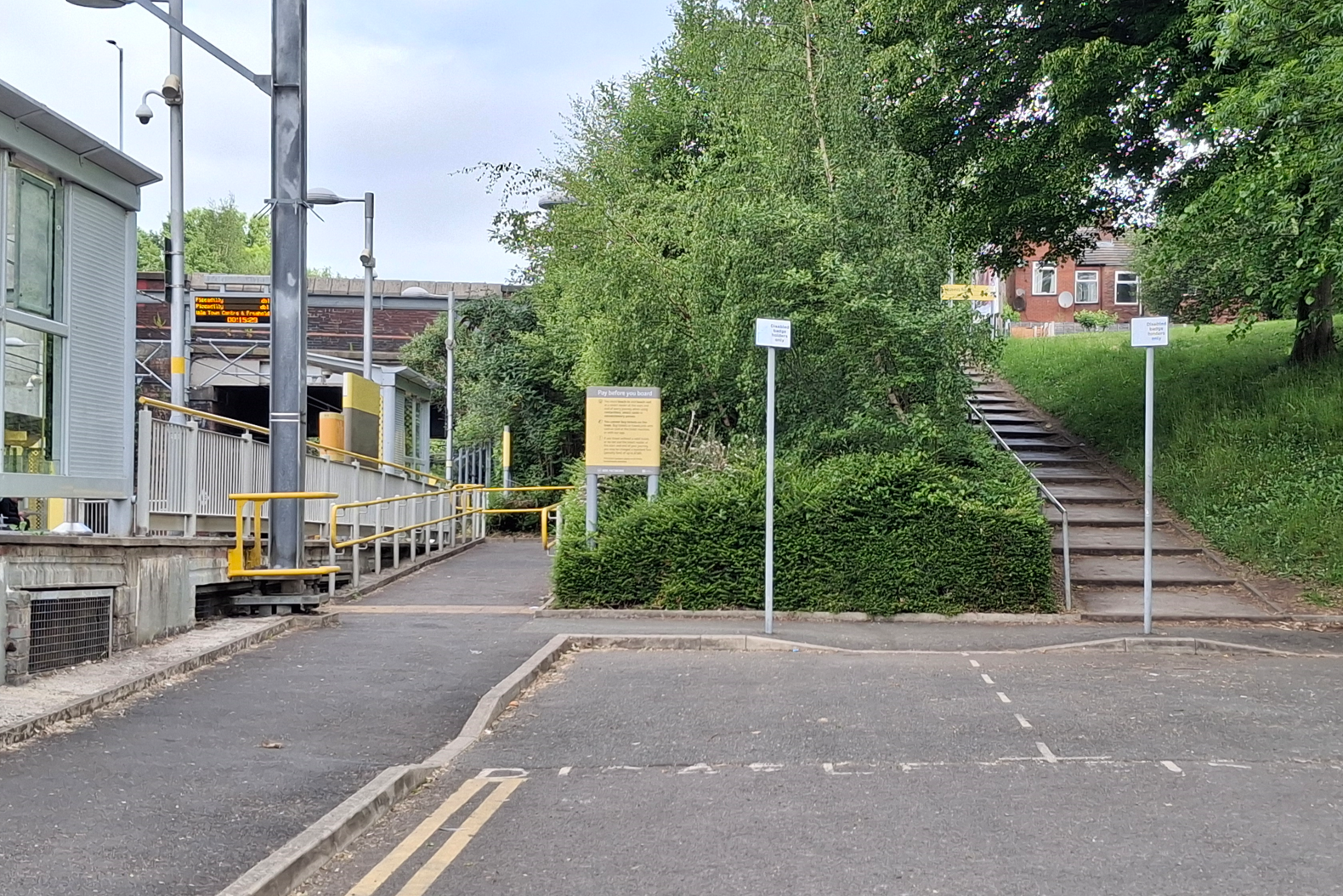
The steps down to Smeaton Street are seen on the right, and the ramp up to the inbound platform on the left.

=== Tram stop ===
Queens Road tram stop was constructed with accessibility in mind. A lift is located at the northern end of the Bury (outbound) platform, and sets of stairs. The only direct entrance to the inbound platform is via a short ramp on Smeaton Street, but it can also be reached using the pedestrian crossing at track level to the south of the platforms. There are steps down to Smeaton Street from the A6010 (road) but they are not part of the Metrolink's infrastructure.

Two dot matrix passenger information displays stand serving one platform each, and show estimated arrival times for trams in minutes up to 30 minutes prior (up to three at a time) and number of carriages.

There are prospective plans to replace the lift here at Queens Road along with some other tram stops due to ongoing issues with accessibility. There is also a turnstile to the south of the Bury platform next to the tram stop's foot crossing which gives access to the depot for staff.

=== Track layout ===
To the south of the station is Irk Valley Junction, where the Oldham and Rochdale Line begins and diverges to the east. To the north is the junction with the main Bury Line and the "main gate" into the depot.

== Queens Road depot ==
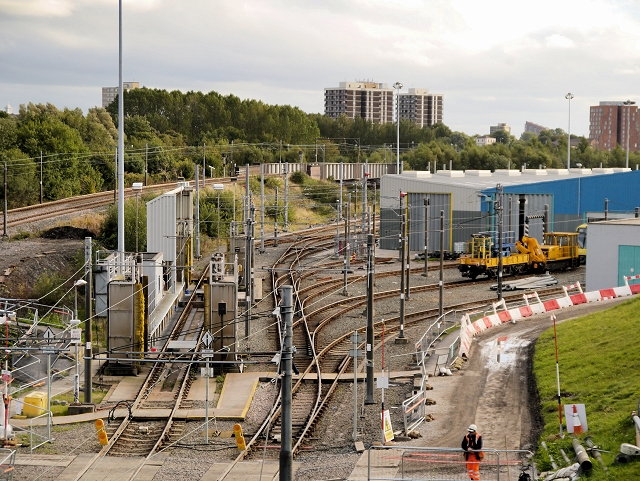
Queens Road depot viewed from the road bridge.

The Queens Road Metrolink depot sits to the south-west of the tram stop. Metrolink has two depots at Queens Road and Old Trafford: Queens Road was the original headquarters of Metrolink, however the headquarters was moved to a new depot in Trafford constructed in 2011 and it began operation in 2013. The depot has a "main gate" and a "back gate", the main gate giving access to trams from the Bury Line, and the back gate giving access from the Oldham and Rochdale Line. Queens Road depot itself sits between the former Cheetham Hill and Queens Road railway junctions, and the junction at Queens Road depot's main gate used to be the site of Queens Road junction before the Metrolink depot was built.

Another railway line used to run in the area called the Cheetham Hill Loop, running from Manchester Victoria passing through Cheetham Hill and Smedley before running to the east directly to meet up with Thorpes Bridge Junction on the present Calder Valley Line. The line operated from 1877 to 1998 (running right next to the depot between 1992 and 1998 of course), and Queens Road depot since 2012 now sits partially on its alignment since the Oldham and Rochdale Line opened. The depot was expanded to have a "back gate" allowing trams from the Oldham and Rochdale Line to also access it, and this access gate is also entirely on the former Cheetham Hill Loop alignment. The Oldham and Rochdale Line itself utilises part of the disused Cheetham Hill Loop, from Smedley Viaduct Junction (Queens Road depot's back gate) up until the east end at Thorpes Bridge Junction. The depot was expanded again in 2022-2023 as part of the Metrolink Capacity Improvement Programme. With 27 new trams being ordered for the Metrolink, additional spaces were created at the depot. Construction began in March 2022 and was expected to be completed in summer 2023. Similar works were also done at Trafford Depot (the other Metrolink depot)concluding in early 2020.

Queens Road depot had an open day on 5 June 1994 marketed as a "Family Fun Day", and at the time was intended to become an annual event, however the event ended up never happening again. Admission was £3.50 which also counted as a full day pass for use anywhere on the Metrolink.

== Services ==
Every route across the Manchester Metrolink network operates to a 12-minute headway (5 tph) Monday–Saturday, and to a 15-minute headway (4 tph) on Sundays and bank holidays. Sections served by a second "peak only" route (like this stop) will have a combined headway of 6 minutes during peak times.

Queens Road is located in Zone 2, and the stop itself has two platforms which aren't named. Trams towards Piccadilly depart from the inbound platform (east) and an extra service runs direct to Altrincham during peak times. Trams to Bury stop at the outbound platform (west).

Preceding station	Manchester Metrolink	Following station
Victoria towards Altrincham	Altrincham–Bury (peak only)	Abraham Moss towards Bury
Victoria towards Piccadilly	Piccadilly–Bury	Abraham Moss towards Bury
Proposed
Sandhills towards Altrincham	Altrincham–Bury (peak only)	Abraham Moss towards Bury
Sandhills towards Piccadilly	Piccadilly–Bury	Abraham Moss towards Bury

== Transport connections ==
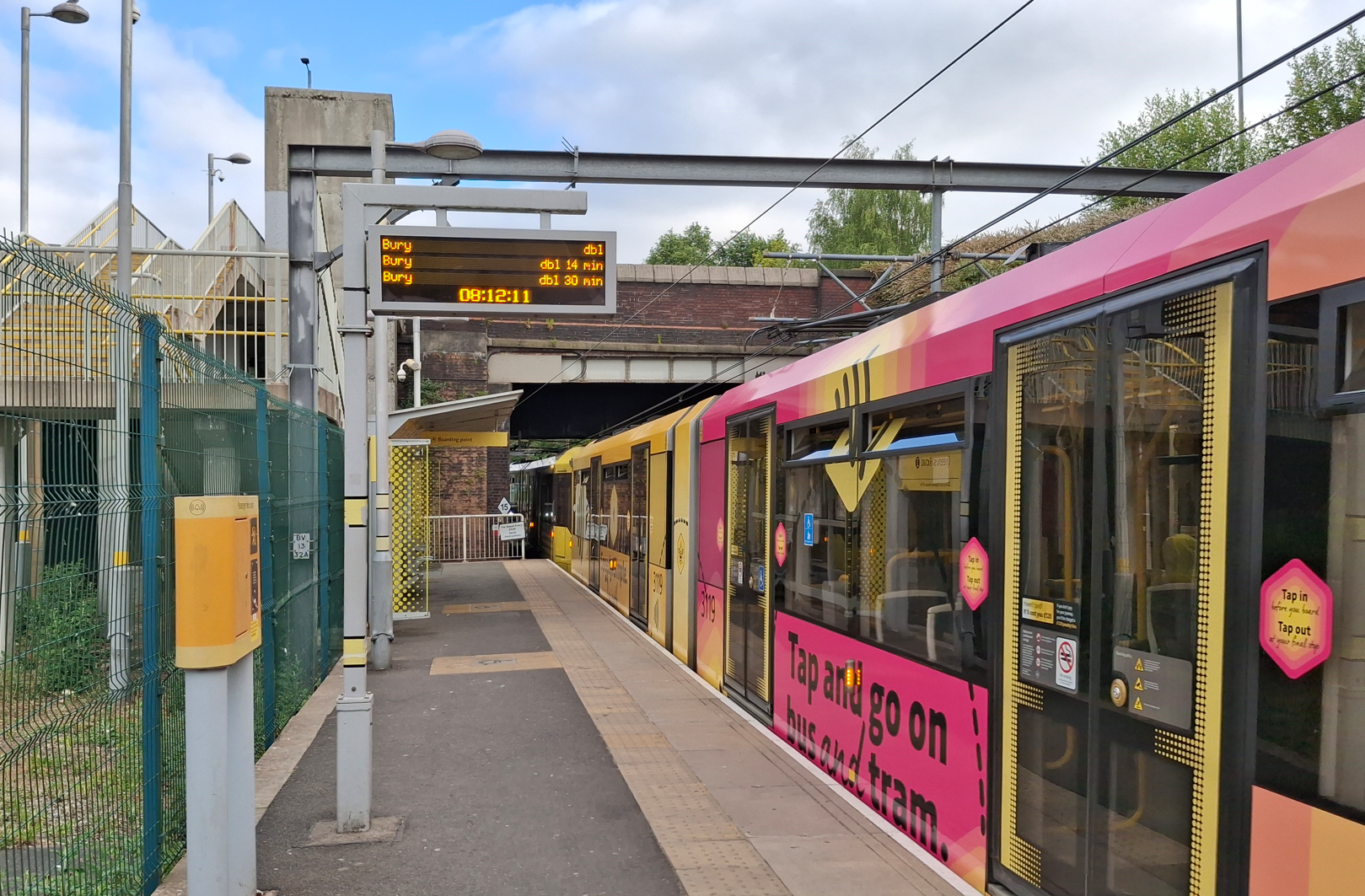
A double tram departing the outbound platform heading for Bury.

=== Bus ===
Queens Road tram stop is served closest by bus route 151 (Ashton-under-Lyne–Higher Crumpsall) on Queens Road, and 156 (Manchester–Middleton) on Smedley Road.

=== Train ===
This tram stop is not connected to or near to any railway stations, but the nearest is Manchester Victoria, approximately 1.5 miles (2.4 km) away walking.

== Incidents ==
- 6 December 1994: Tram 1017 derailed in the vicinity of Collyhurst tunnel running empty from Queens Road.
- 1 February 2007: Tram 1013 split a set of points while being moved at Queens Road depot. This caused the tram to end up diagonally, across two tracks. None of the bogies were derailed in the incident.
- 3 August 2013: Tram 3056, which was not in service, derails at the entrance to Queens Road depot.
- 27 July 2025: Tram 3138 derailed at Queens Road depot. It re-entered service on 20 December 2025 after a test run the day before.

== See also ==
- Museum of Transport, Greater Manchester
