= Museum of Transport =

Museum of Transport can refer to:

- Glasgow Museum of Transport
- Birmingham and Midland Museum of Transport
- National Museum of Transportation, St. Louis, Missouri
- Museum of Transport in Manchester, UK

See also:

- List of transport museums
