= Bury Line =

Manchester Metrolink line

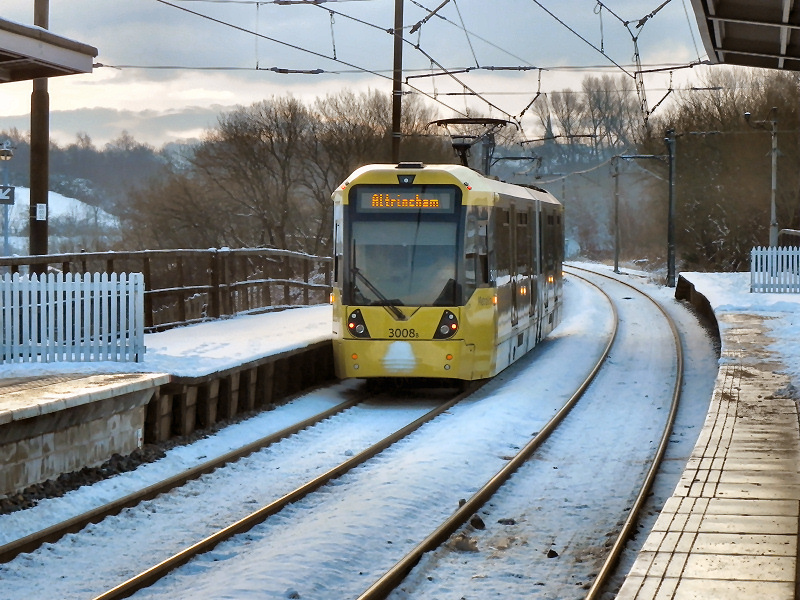
- A Bombardier M5000 at Radcliffe tram stop.

Overview
- Status: In service
- Locale: Greater Manchester
- Termini: Victoria; Bury
- Stations: 11
- Website: beenetwork.com

Service
- Type: Tram/Light rail
- System: Manchester Metrolink
- Operator(s): KeolisAmey Metrolink
- Rolling stock: Bombardier M5000 (2009-Present); AnsaldoBreda T-68/T68A (1992-2014)

History
- Opened: 6 April 1992

Technical
- Line length: 9.9 miles (15.9 km)
- Character: Converted heavy rail line
- Track gauge: 4 ft 8 1/2 in (1,435 mm) standard gauge
- Electrification: 750 V DC overhead
- Operating speed: 50 mph (80km/h)

The Bury Line is a light rail/tram line on the Manchester Metrolink in Greater Manchester. It runs from Manchester Victoria station to Bury Interchange in the north. The entire line runs along a converted heavy rail line, and was reopened with the Altrincham Line, another Metrolink line converted from heavy rail, as part of Phase 1 of the Metrolink's expansion.

The line connects Manchester city centre to the suburbs of Cheetham Hill, Crumpsall, Blackley, Prestwich, Whitefield and Radcliffe. The entire route is roughly 10 miles (16 km) long.

== History ==
=== Pre-Metrolink ===
The line was originally heavy rail. The first part of what is now the Bury Line (between Radcliffe and Bury) was opened by the East Lancashire Railway (ELR) in 1846, From Manchester Victoria to Bury Bolton Street via Salford, Clifton Junction and Radcliffe, continuing north from Bury to Rawtenstall. The ELR was absorbed into the Lancashire and Yorkshire Railway (L&YR) in 1859.

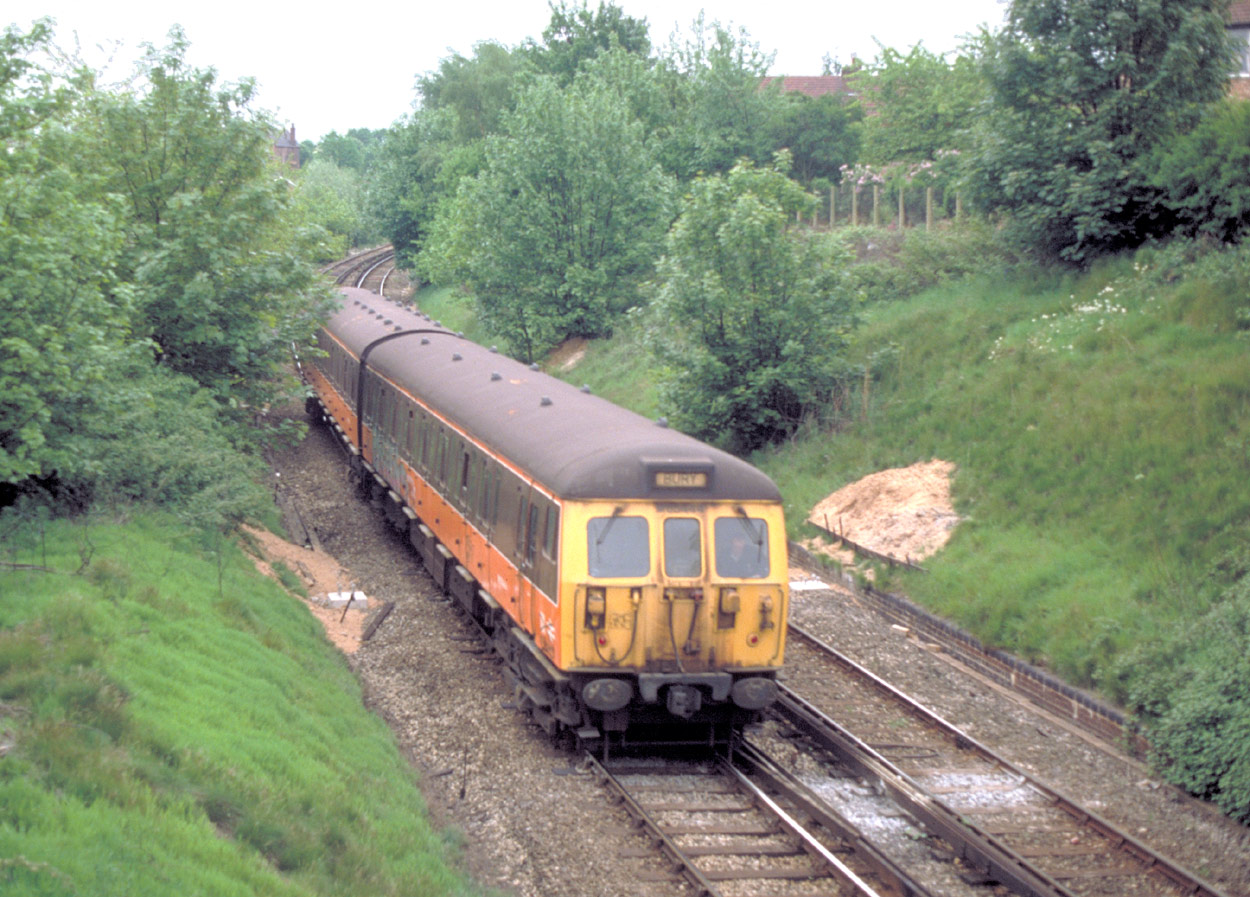
The Bury Line shortly before conversion to Metrolink, operated by a Class 504 unit.

The rest of the present Bury Line was opened in 1879. In order to connect the growing suburbs of Cheetham Hill, Prestwich and Whitefield, the L&YR obtained an act to construct a new line from Manchester in 1872 to the original ELR line at Radcliffe. Construction began in 1876 and was completed in 1879. Originally the line had only five intermediate stations at Crumpsall, Heaton Park, Prestwich, Whitefield and Radcliffe. Three more stations were added later: Woodlands Road, Bowker Vale and Besses o' th' Barn.

In response to competition from trams, the line was electrified in 1916 using a unique 1200V DC side-contact third rail system, which remained in operation until the line was converted to Metrolink in 1991. From 1959 – 1991, the line was operated by Class 504 EMUs. In 1961 they were scheduled to cover the 9.75 mi (15.69 km) from Bolton Street to Victoria in 23 minutes and take 24 minutes in the other direction, running at 20 minute intervals for most of the day, but half-hourly on Sundays.

In August 1953, the Irk Valley Junction rail crash occurred on the line near Manchester Victoria, resulting in ten deaths and 58 injuries. It was caused by an electric train overrunning a danger signal which collided with a steam train, resulting in the front carriage of the electric train crashing into the River Irk.

The original Bury Bolton Street station was closed to British Rail in 1980 and replaced by the new, more conveniently located Bury Interchange terminus. The original station is now part of the East Lancashire heritage railway.

=== Conversion to Metrolink ===
The Bury line was identified by transport planners in the 1980s as one of the local railway lines in the Greater Manchester area which was used mostly for local traffic, and could therefore be split off from the main line network and converted to light-rail operation. It was chosen for conversion as part of the first phase of the Metrolink, along with the MSJ&AR Line to the south of Manchester: The two previously unconnected lines were to be linked together by a new street-running line across Manchester city-centre, which included a short branch to Manchester Piccadilly railway station. Trams on the Bury Line would thus continue from Victoria station into the city-centre, to either Altrincham or Piccadilly via a new exit into the streets to the south.

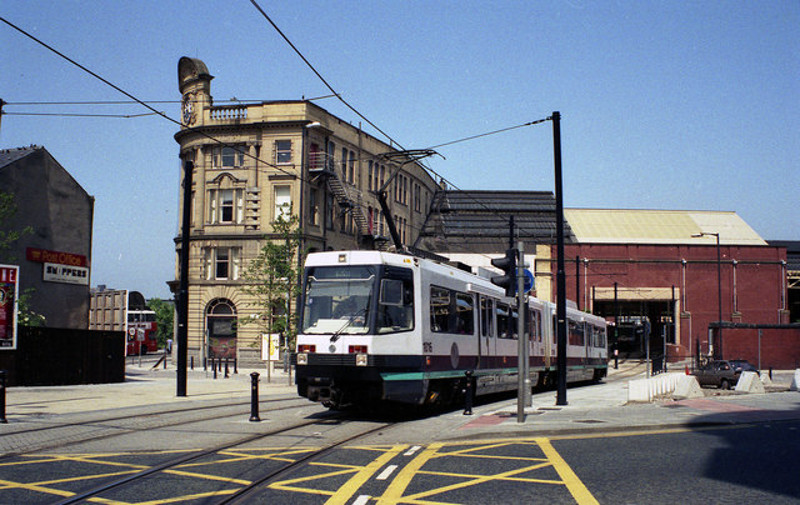
A T-68 tram emerging into the streets from Victoria railway station in June 1992.

Railway operations ended after 17 August 1991, in order for the line to be converted to Metrolink. This mostly entailed removing the third rail system and replacing it with a 750V DC overhead line system. Funding only allowed for minimum upgrades to be made, and so most of the infrastructure such as the stations and track were changed little. This meant that it only took a few months to reopen.

The Bury Line opened on 6 April 1992 as the first Metrolink line to enter service. On 27 April, the First City Crossing (as it is now referred to) opened, and trams then ran from Bury to G-Mex (renamed Deansgate-Castlefield in 2010) via Victoria. G-Mex would be the first station on the soon to be opened Altrincham Line, which opened on 15 June 1992. The branch to Manchester Piccadilly railway station and Piccadilly Gardens opened on 20 July 1992.

=== Modifications since opening ===
One of the original stations, Woodlands Road, was closed in 2013 after Abraham Moss and Queens Road were opened nearby. Queens Road stop was converted from a staff halt.

Crumpsall tram stop was redeveloped between 2017 and 2019, which involved the construction of a third platform and improved accessibility to the station.

In late 2020, Hagside Level Crossing, located between Radcliffe and Bury, had its signal box and barriers removed, being reduced to a tram crossing that isn't signalled. Trams travelling past the crossing previously could travel at full line speed (50mph), but after the barriers were removed, a permanent speed restriction of 25mph towards Bury and 20mph towards Radcliffe is now in place at the approach to the crossing.

== Services ==
Two tram routes run along the Bury Line, one from Bury – Piccadilly that runs during all Metrolink operational times, and another from Bury – Altrincham. which only operates during peak times.

=== Rolling stock ===
All services are currently operated by M5000 trams.

Between 1992 and 2009, the line was operated by the original fleet of 26 T-68 trams. From 2009 the new fleet of M5000 trams was introduced, and these replaced the original T-68 trams. which were withdrawn from service during 2012–14.

== Route ==
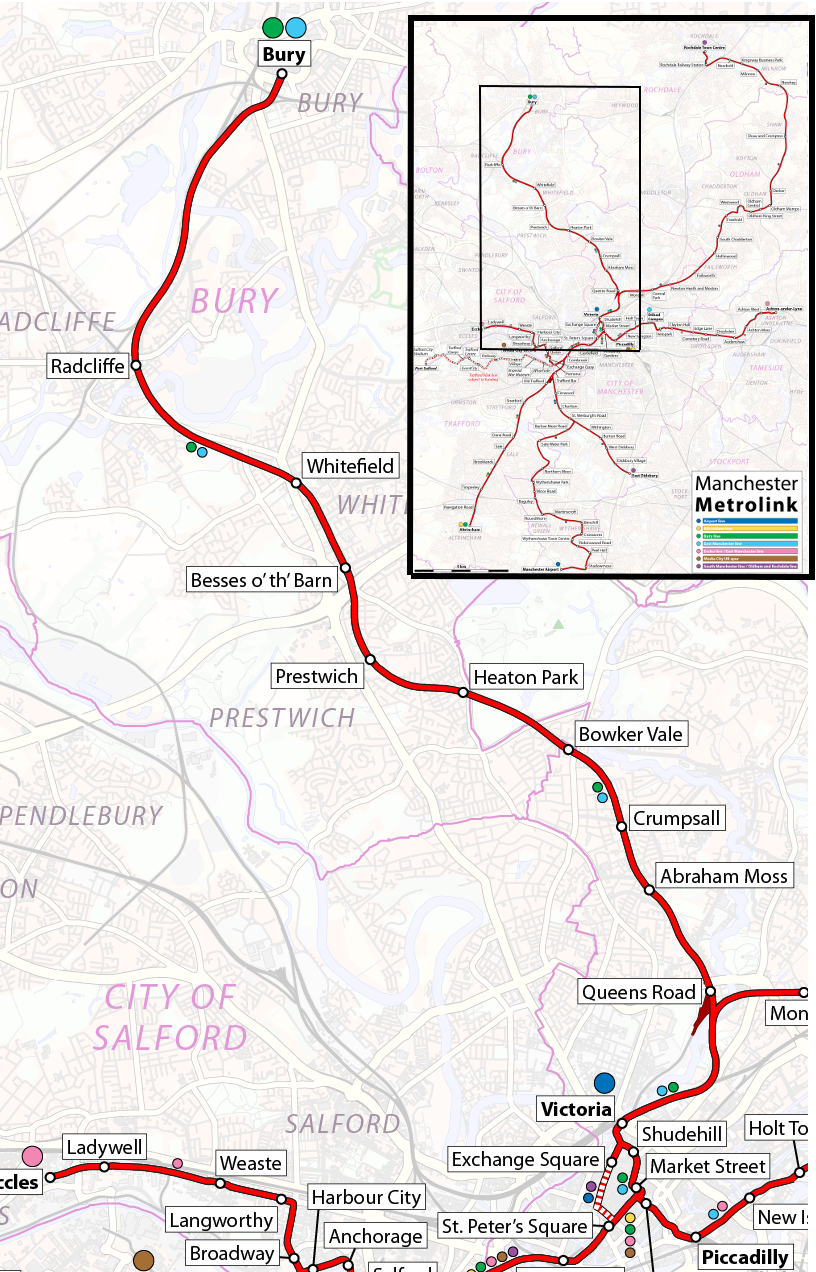
Map of the Bury Line.

The Bury Line was converted from a railway line beginning at Manchester Victoria station, and historically begins for the Metrolink at Victoria tram stop. The Bury Line was the first line to operate on the Metrolink system.

After Victoria, the line runs along Manchester Victoria East Junction with the railway lines, then passes underneath the main line via Collyhurst Tunnel. After leaving the tunnel, it travels on a viaduct, keeps left at the Irk Valley Junction (right for the Oldham and Rochdale Line) and passes by Queens Road depot, and serves its first stop at Queens Road, new for the Bury Line. It travels past the tram entrance to the depot, then serves a stop at Abraham Moss, also a new station that has not been converted from train operation. Woodlands Road tram stop, which was located between the two, was closed in 2013 to make way for the new stops serving more areas of North Manchester.

The route then runs past a redeveloped station: Crumpsall, and Bowker Vale, then travels underneath Heaton Park through a like-named tunnel, to reach Heaton Park stop. It then serves Prestwich, and travels on a bridge over both the M60 and Bury Old Road to get to Besses o' th' Barn. It serves more stops at Whitefield and Radcliffe, and gets to a level crossing, before passing by the junction for the former Bury railway terminus at Bolton Street, and bears right to reach Bury Interchange at Bury tram stop. Bury Interchange railway station was opened in 1980 to replace Bury Bolton Street, providing easier access, as this site was much closer to the centre of the town.

== See also ==
- Bury to Holcombe Brook Line
