= Prestwich tram stop =

Manchester Metrolink tram stop

Prestwich
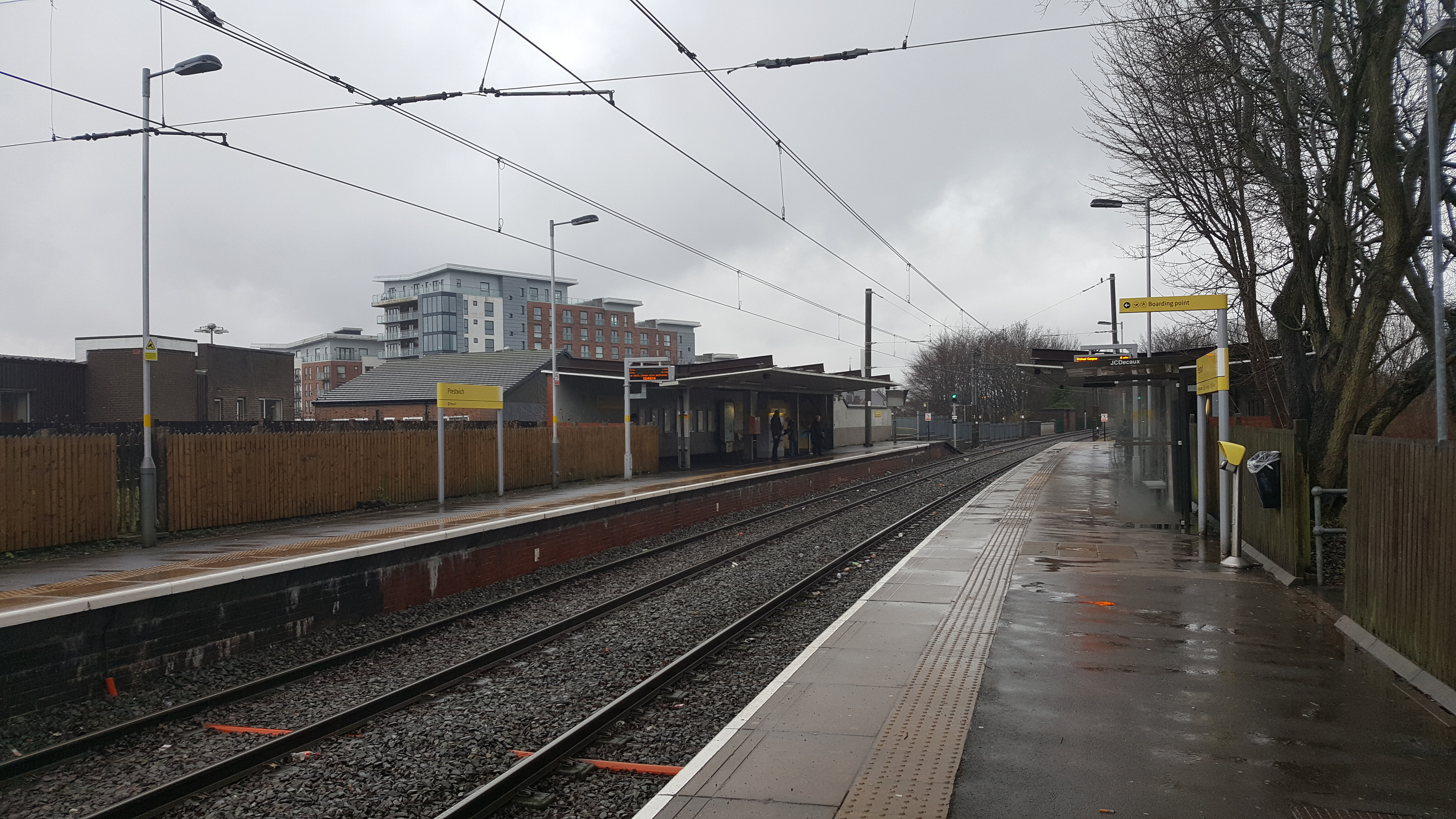
- Prestwich Metrolink station in Jan 2017.

General information
- Location: Prestwich, Bury; England
- Coordinates: 53.53329°N 2.28185°W
- Grid reference: SD814041
- System: Metrolink station
- Line: Bury Line
- Platforms: 2

Other information
- Status: In operation
- Fare zone: 3

History
- Opened: 1 September 1879
- Original company: Lancashire and Yorkshire Railway
- Pre-grouping: Lancashire and Yorkshire Railway
- Post-grouping: London, Midland and Scottish Railway; British Rail

Key dates
- 17 August 1991: Closed as a rail station
- 6 April 1992: Conversion to Metrolink operation
Route map
Location

Prestwich is a tram stop in the town of Prestwich, Greater Manchester, England. It is on the Bury Line of Greater Manchester's light rail Metrolink system.

== History ==
The stop was originally Prestwich railway station, which was along the Manchester to Bury heavy rail line, completed by the Lancashire & Yorkshire Railway, in 1879 and opened on 1 September. The line was converted from steam to electric power on 17 April 1916, using the third rail system. The station closed on 17 August 1991 to allow conversion of the route to the Metrolink system using overhead power lines, reopening on 6 April 1992.

The station forms part of Zone 3. It is located off Rectory Lane. A walkway connects the station to the Longfield Suite Precinct and Bury New Road (A56).

== Services ==
Services mostly run every 12 minutes on 2 routes, forming a 6-minute service between Bury and Manchester at peak times.

Preceding station	Manchester Metrolink	Following station
Heaton Park towards Altrincham	Altrincham–Bury (peak only)	Besses o' th' Barn towards Bury
Heaton Park towards Piccadilly	Piccadilly–Bury	Besses o' th' Barn towards Bury

== Connecting bus routes ==
Arriva North West service 484 ran to Eccles until Late 2020 when it was replaced by Diamond North West service 66 which stops outside the station.

On Bury New Road, which is on the opposite side of the shopping centre, Stagecoach Manchester (Bee Network) services 97 and 98 run between Bury and Manchester (97 via Unsworth, 98 via Whitefield and Radcliffe), along with Stagecoach Manchester (Bee Network) service 95 between Bury and Salford, (Via Unsworth, Whitefield and Carr Clough) and Stagecoach Manchester (Bee Network) service 90 between Simister and Sedgely Park (Via Carr Clough). Blackburn Bus Company run service X41 (Branded as Red Express) between Manchester and Blackburn via Accrington and Burnley Bus Company run service X43 (Branded as Witchway) between Manchester and Nelson via Rawtenstall and Burnley also stop on Bury New Road.
