= Heaton Park tram stop =

Manchester Metrolink tram stop

Heaton Park
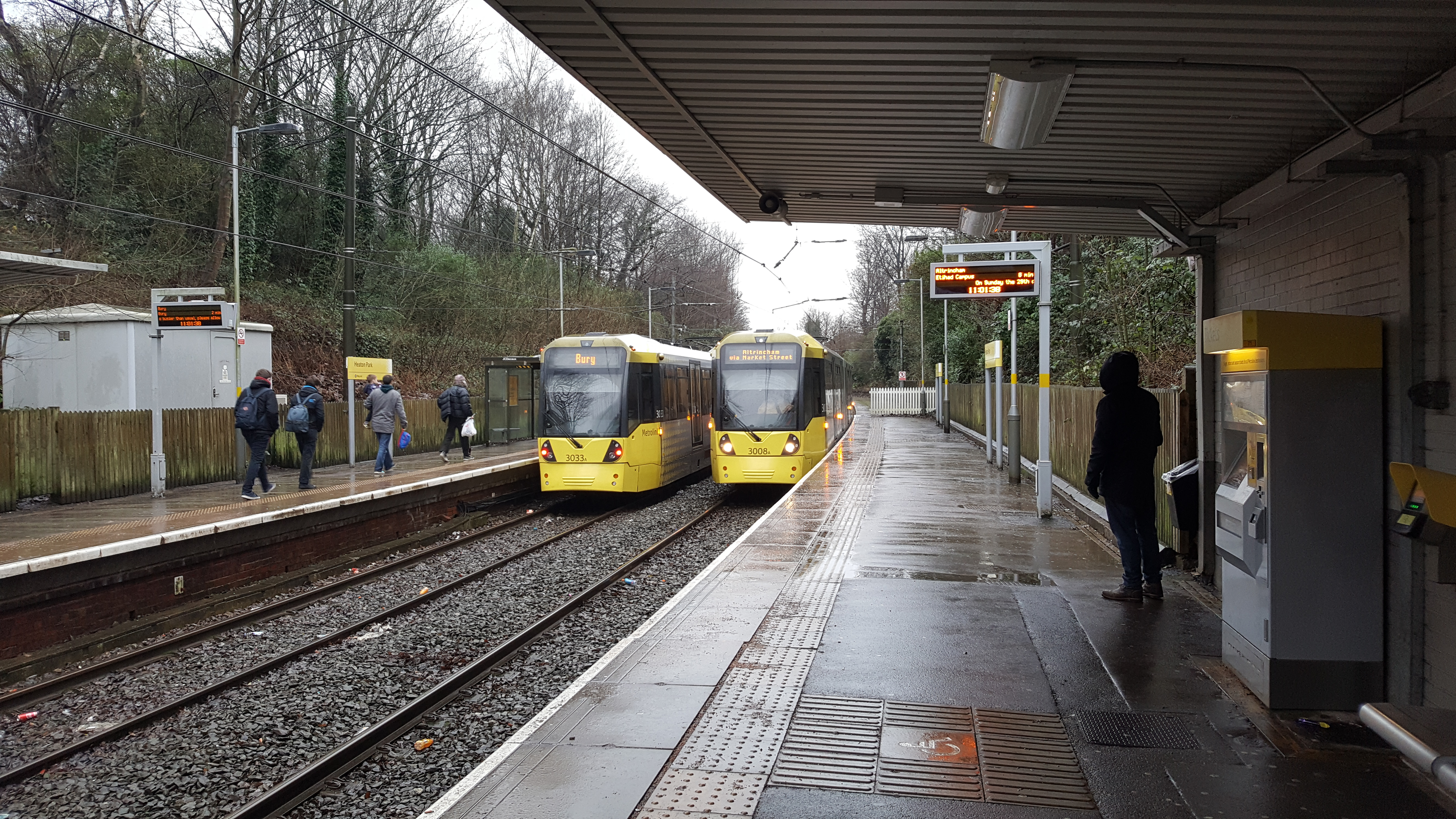
- Two M5000 trams at Heaton Park station in January 2017

General information
- Location: Prestwich, Bury; England
- Coordinates: 53.53049°N 2.26716°W
- Grid reference: SD824038
- System: Metrolink station
- Line: Bury Line
- Platforms: 2

Other information
- Status: In operation
- Fare zone: 3

History
- Opened: 1879
- Original company: Lancashire and Yorkshire Railway
- Pre-grouping: Lancashire and Yorkshire Railway
- Post-grouping: London, Midland and Scottish Railway; British Rail

Key dates
- 6 April 1992: Conversion to Metrolink operation
Route map
Location

Heaton Park is a tram stop at Heaton Park in the town of Prestwich, Greater Manchester, England. It is on the Bury Line of Greater Manchester's light rail Metrolink system. It is part of Ticketing Zone 3, and is at the corner of Whittaker Lane and Bury Old Road, with an entrance to Heaton Park. This Metrolink stop is some 800 metres (2,600 ft) from the Lakeside terminus of the Heaton Park Tramway, the heritage tramway within Heaton Park.

== Services ==
Services run every 12 minutes on two routes, forming a 6-minute service between Bury and Manchester at peak times.

Preceding station	Manchester Metrolink	Following station
Bowker Vale towards Altrincham	Altrincham–Bury (peak only)	Prestwich towards Bury
Bowker Vale towards Piccadilly	Piccadilly–Bury	Prestwich towards Bury

== Connecting bus routes ==
Go North West's 135 service calls outside the station towards Bury and Manchester. Tyrers Coaches run the 94 service between Bury and North Manchester General Hospital via Pilsworth Asda and Polefield. Arriva service 484 ran from Prestwich village to Kersal, Pendlebury, Swinton, Monton and Eccles, Until late 2020. Diamond also runs the 66 service that runs to Eccles from Prestwich Hospital.

== Gallery ==
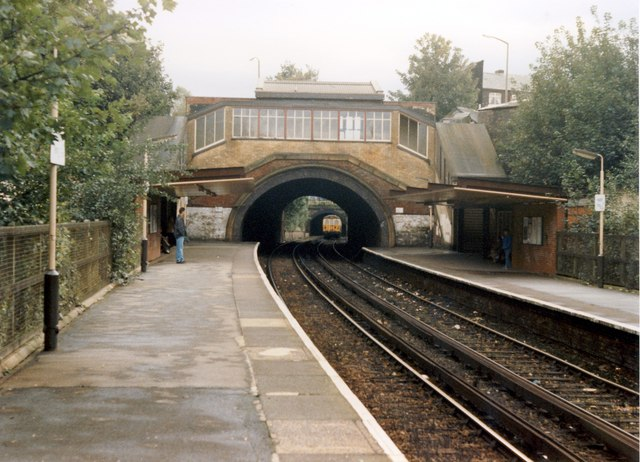
Heaton Park railway station in 1988

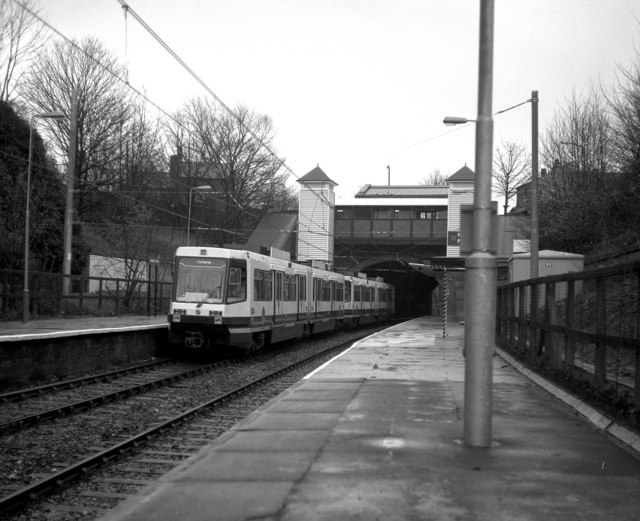
Heaton Park Metrolink station on opening day in 1992

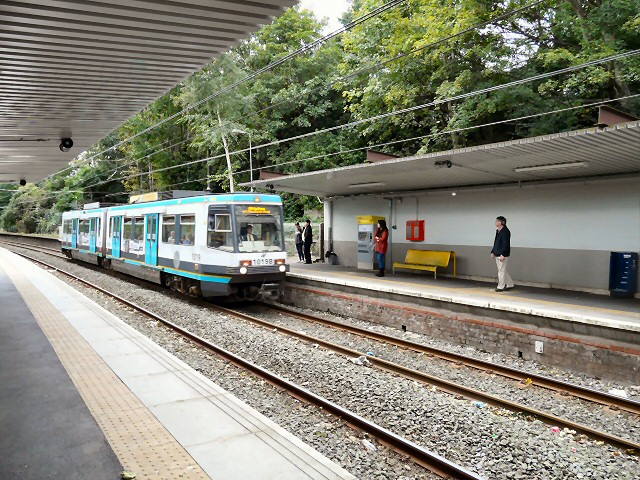
An Altrincham-bound T-68 tram arriving at Heaton Park.

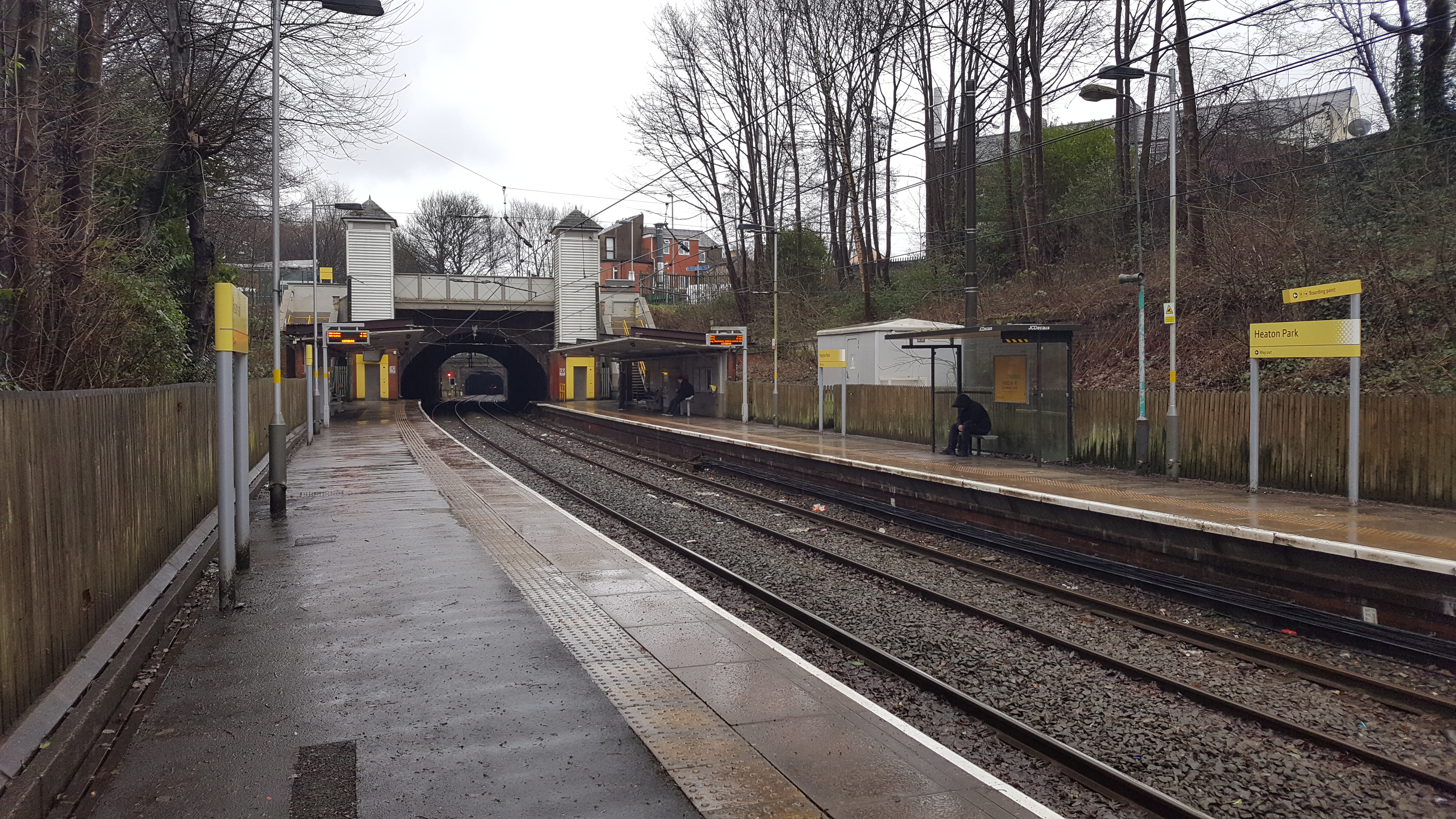
Heaton Park tram station in January 2017.
