= Bowker Vale tram stop =

Tram stop in Greater Manchester, England

Bowker Vale
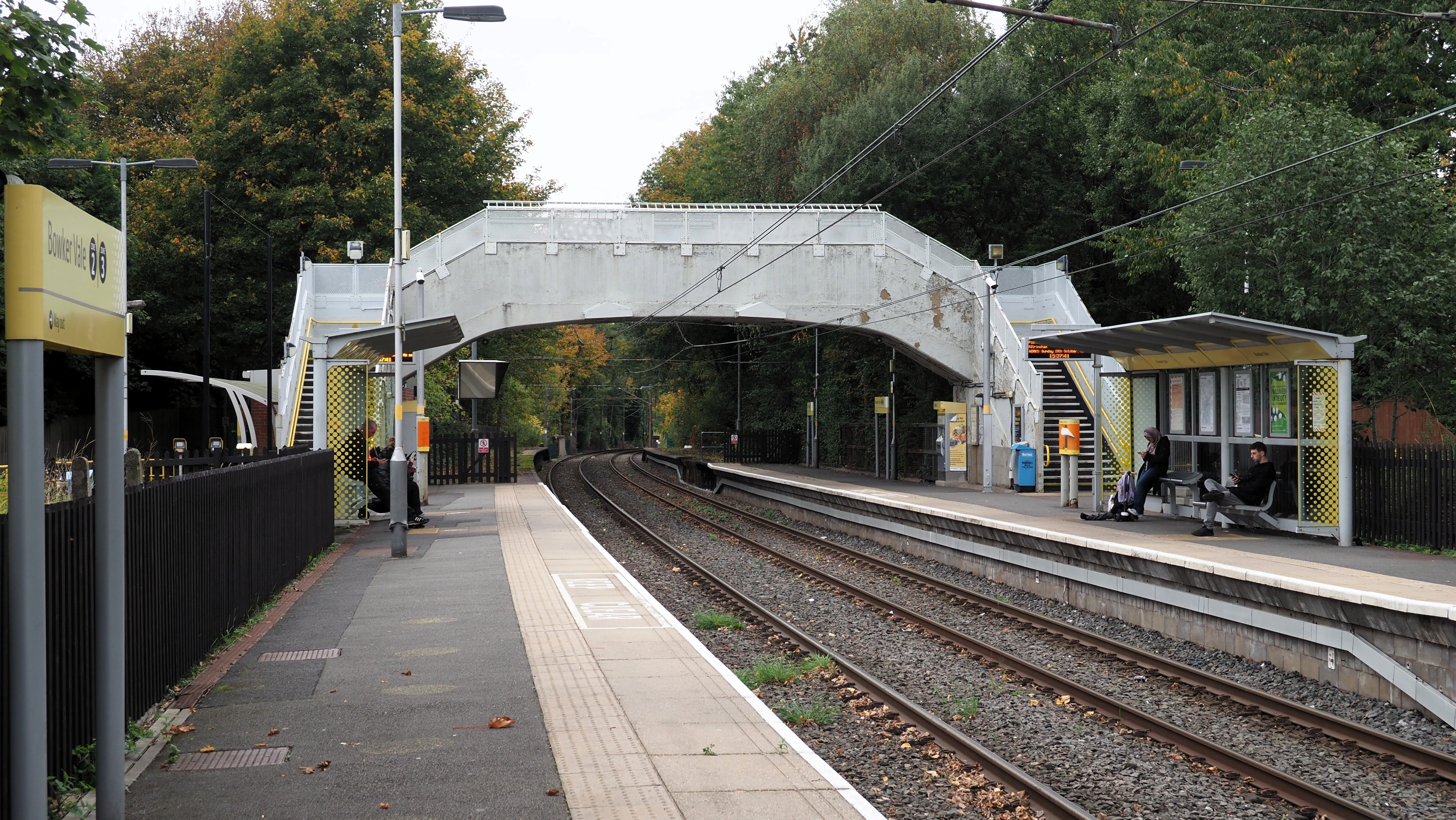
- Bowker Vale in October 2025

General information
- Location: Bowker Vale and Blackley, City of Manchester; England
- Coordinates: 53.5249°N 2.2499°W
- Grid reference: SD835031
- System: Metrolink station
- Line: Bury Line
- Platforms: 2

Other information
- Status: In operation
- Fare zone: 2/3

History
- Opened: 26 September 1938
- Original company: London, Midland and Scottish Railway
- Post-grouping: London, Midland and Scottish Railway; British Rail

Key dates
- 17 August 1991: Closed as a rail station
- 6 April 1992: Conversion to Metrolink operation
Route map
Location

Bowker Vale is a tram stop in the suburban areas of Bowker Vale and Blackley, Greater Manchester, England. It is on the Bury Line of Greater Manchester's light rail Metrolink system.

== History ==
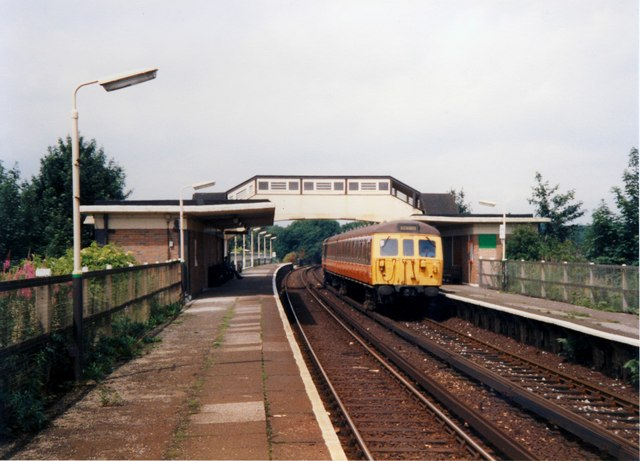
Bowker Vale railway station in 1988

The station is adjacent to the site of the original Bowker Vale railway station, opened on 26 September 1938 by the London Midland and Scottish Railway. The architecture of the station buildings and footbridge is a striking example of 1930s concrete design, perhaps inspired by the developments on the London Underground at the time. The tram stop opened to passengers on 6 April 1992 as part of Phase 1 of the system's expansion and is on the border between the Metropolitan Borough of Bury and Manchester, England.

The station forms part of Metrolink Ticketing Zone 2. The bottom of the embankment to the north-east of the station forms part of the boundary between the City of Manchester and the Metropolitan Borough of Bury between the districts of Prestwich, Blackley and Crumpsall. The station is situated between Middleton Road and Windsor Road, three passageways provide public access to the station. Ticket machines are located on each platform. There is a public telephone located on the Bury-bound platform.

== Services ==
Services mostly run every 12 minutes on 2 routes, forming a 6-minute service between Bury and Manchester at peak times.

Preceding station	Manchester Metrolink	Following station
Crumpsall towards Altrincham	Altrincham–Bury (peak only)	Heaton Park towards Bury
Crumpsall towards Piccadilly	Piccadilly–Bury	Heaton Park towards Bury

== Connecting bus routes ==
From the station-adjacent bus stop, First Greater Manchester service 59 travel to Oldham. The 59 via Middleton before continuing to Rushcroft via Shaw. Go North West service 41 travels towards Sale via Manchester and MRI. Stagecoach Greater Manchester service 41 also run Middleton in weekday evenings.

On the opposite side of Middleton Road from the station bus 59 travel towards Manchester, as does Stagecoach service 41, with services 41 calling at North Manchester General Hospital and Crumpsall en route.

Under the introduction of the franchised Bee Network, most services were revised with the majority operated by Stagecoach Manchester. Diamond Bus North West operate several school routes.
