= Museum of Transport, Greater Manchester =

Museum in Manchester, England

Museum of Transport

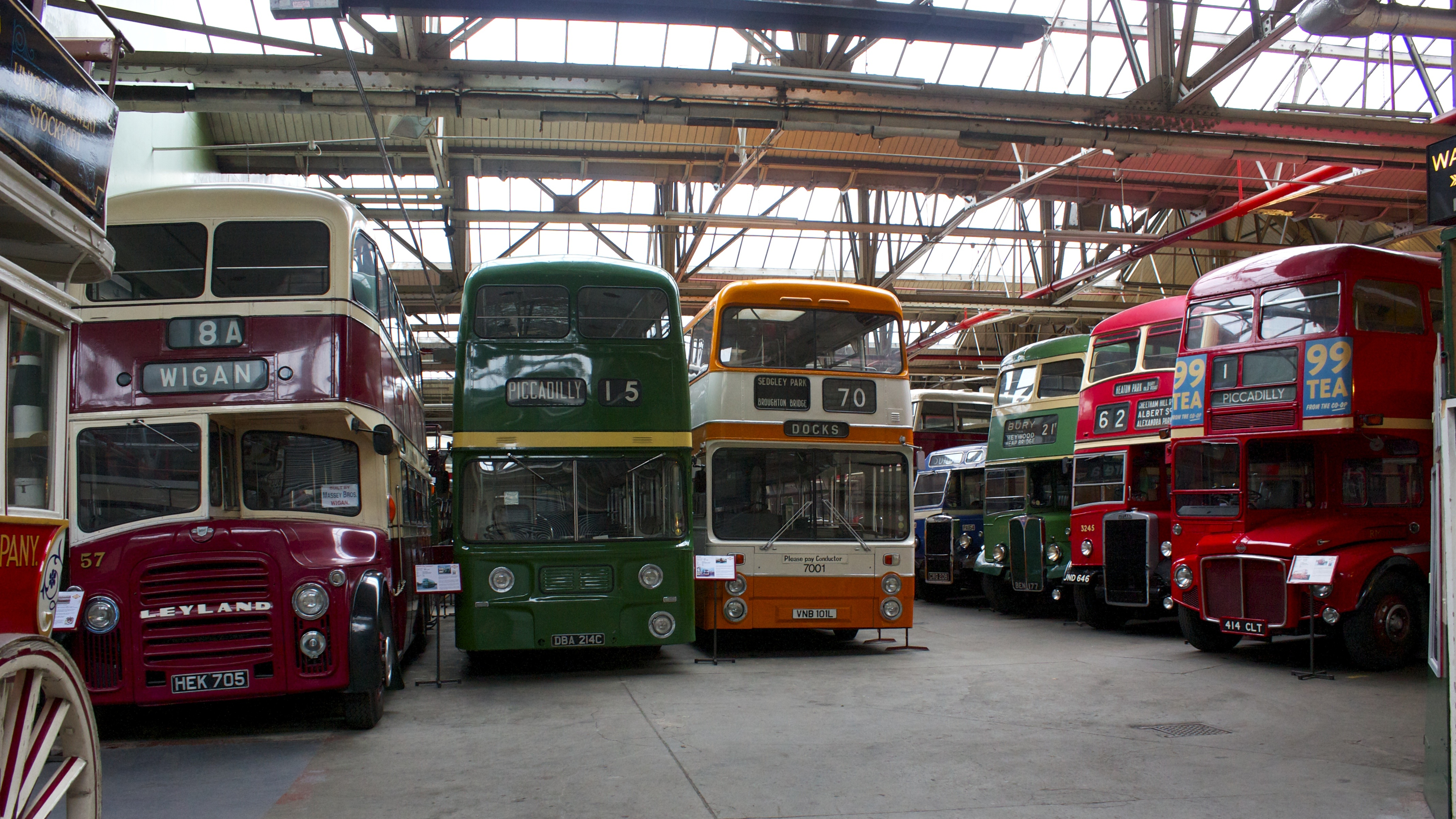
- The vehicle collection in the Museum of Transport

- Location within Greater Manchester
- Established: 27 May 1979
- Location: Cheetham Hill, Manchester, UK
- Coordinates: 53°30′10″N 2°14′00″W
- Type: Transport museum
- Accreditation: Arts Council England
- Collections: Horse-drawn omnibuses, buses, trolleybuses, trams, transport-related objects and documents
- Owners: TfGM and Greater Manchester Transport Society
- Public transit access: Queens Road
- Website: motgm.uk

Listed Building – Grade II
- Official name: Bus Depot and Transport Museum
- Designated: 19 June 1988
- Reference no.: 1247471

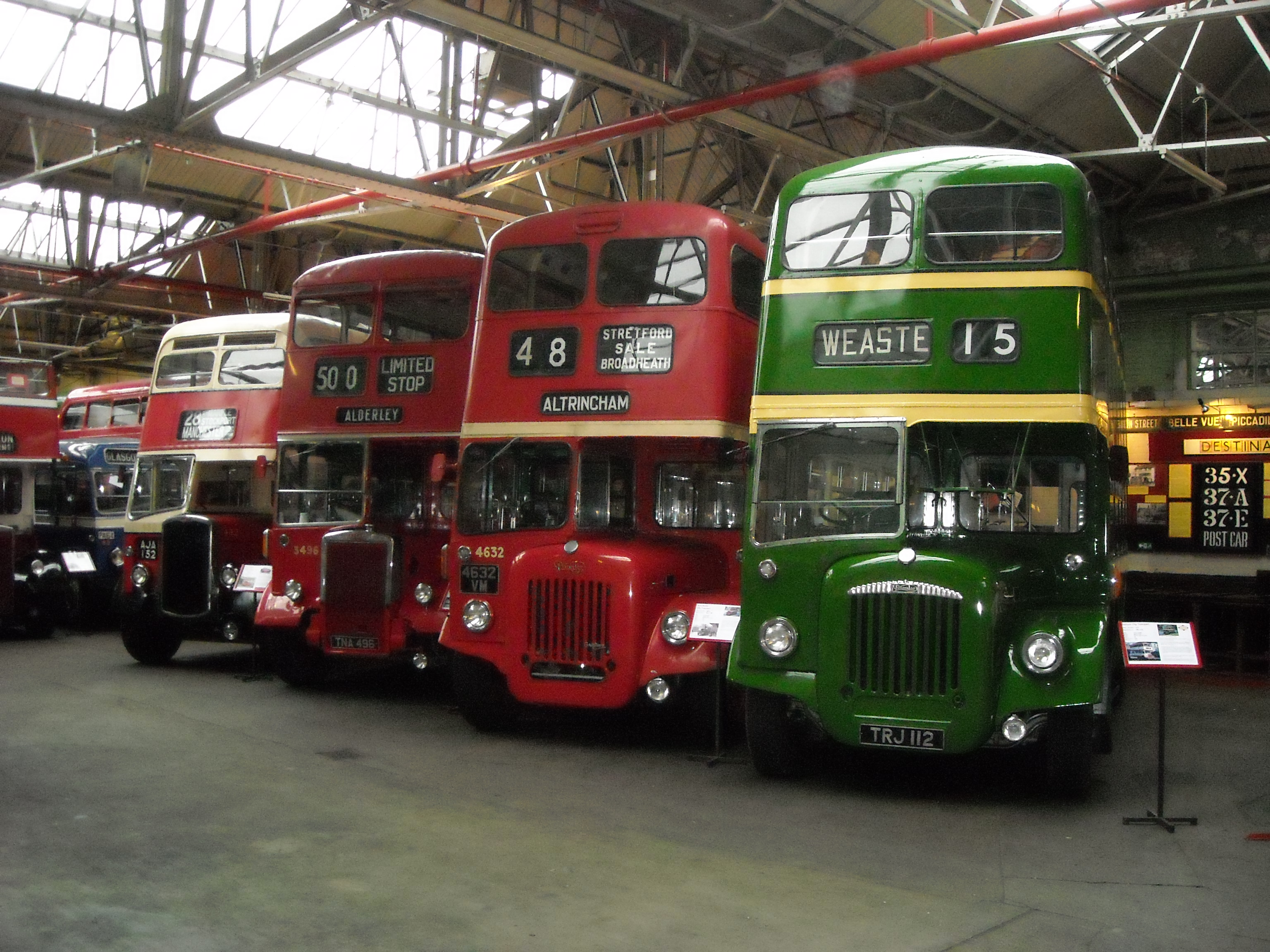
A former North Western Road Car, two Manchester Corporation buses and one Salford Corporation all inside the Museum of Transport, Manchester and in their original liveries.

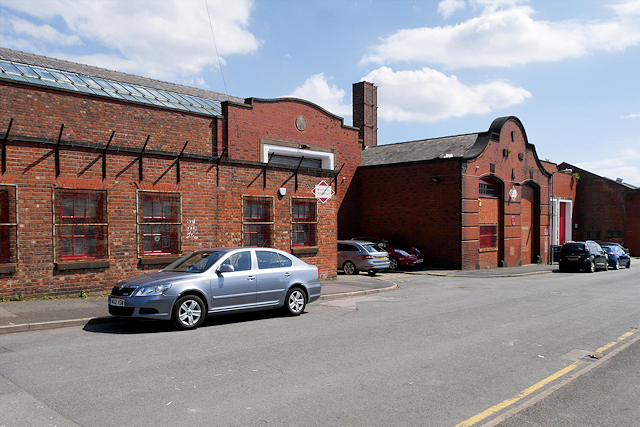
Greater Manchester Museum of Transport entrance

The Museum of Transport, Greater Manchester aims to preserve and promote the public transport heritage of Greater Manchester in North West England. It is located in the Cheetham Hill area of Manchester.

== Background ==
The museum was established in 1977 at Boyle Street, Cheetham Hill. It opened to the public on 27 May 1979. The day-to-day running of the museum is carried out by volunteers.

The museum is housed in a former Manchester Corporation Transport bus depot, to the rear of a former electric tram shed on Queens Road, built in 1901. The museum building itself was added later and consists of two distinct halves, a dedicated bus garage completed in 1928, which now serves as the museum entrance area and upper hall, and a lower hall which was created in 1935 by constructing a roof over the open space between the tram shed and the 1928 bus depot. The former tram shed is still in use today as a bus depot, occupied by Stagecoach Manchester. The whole block of buildings was Grade II listed in 1988 for its historical significance.

The museum became a registered charity in 1980, and a Registered Museum in May 2003.

== Collection ==
The museum holds a sizeable collection, including around 80 buses, of which 70 or so are kept on the site, one of the largest collections of its kind in the United Kingdom. Due to the size of the building, some vehicles have to be kept off-site, with exhibits changed around every so often. In addition, vehicles often attend events around the country in the summer months. The museum collection is constantly developing and restoration work can often be seen by visitors. Also in the collection are two trolleybuses from Manchester and Ashton-under-Lyne corporations, and the prototype body Manchester Metrolink tram.

In addition to vehicle exhibits, the collection of objects includes old transport signs, uniforms, vehicle fittings, ticketing equipment, and several items used by Warner Bros. during the filming of Harry Potter and the Prisoner of Azkaban.

The extensive archive collection is available for research purposes by appointment and includes historic timetables, maps, books, posters, manuals and plans. The museum also holds a photographic archive collection, much of which is available online via the GMTS account on Flickr.com.

== Events ==
The museum holds a number of regular events throughout the year.

- February: Morris Minor car event.
- May: Themed event.
- September: participation in UK Heritage Open Days.
- October: Themed event.
- December: The Christmas Cracker – Market day for specialist retailers and booksellers.

In 2023 the museum operated a 'twilight running day' event, where visitors could ride on the buses into the evening.

For most of these events, a heritage bus service from Manchester Victoria station to the museum runs every 20 minutes between 09:50 and 17:00.

== Location ==
The museum is approximately 2 miles (3.2 km) north of Manchester city centre, close to the junction of the A665 (Cheetham Hill Road) and A6010 (Queens Road). It is at the north end of Boyle Street, adjoining the Stagecoach operated Bee Network bus garage. The Queens Road tram stop on the Manchester Metrolink is 200 metres (660 ft) away. Bus services 41, 135 and 151 stop nearby. The museum is signposted from the Manchester Fort shopping centre.

The museum is open from 10 a.m. to 4.30 p.m. on Wednesdays, Saturdays, Sundays and Public Holidays (except at Christmas and New Year).

== See also ==
- Science and Industry Museum
- List of museums in Greater Manchester
- List of transport museums
- Listed buildings in Manchester-M8
