= Besses o' th' Barn tram stop =

Manchester Metrolink tram stop

Besses o' th' Barn
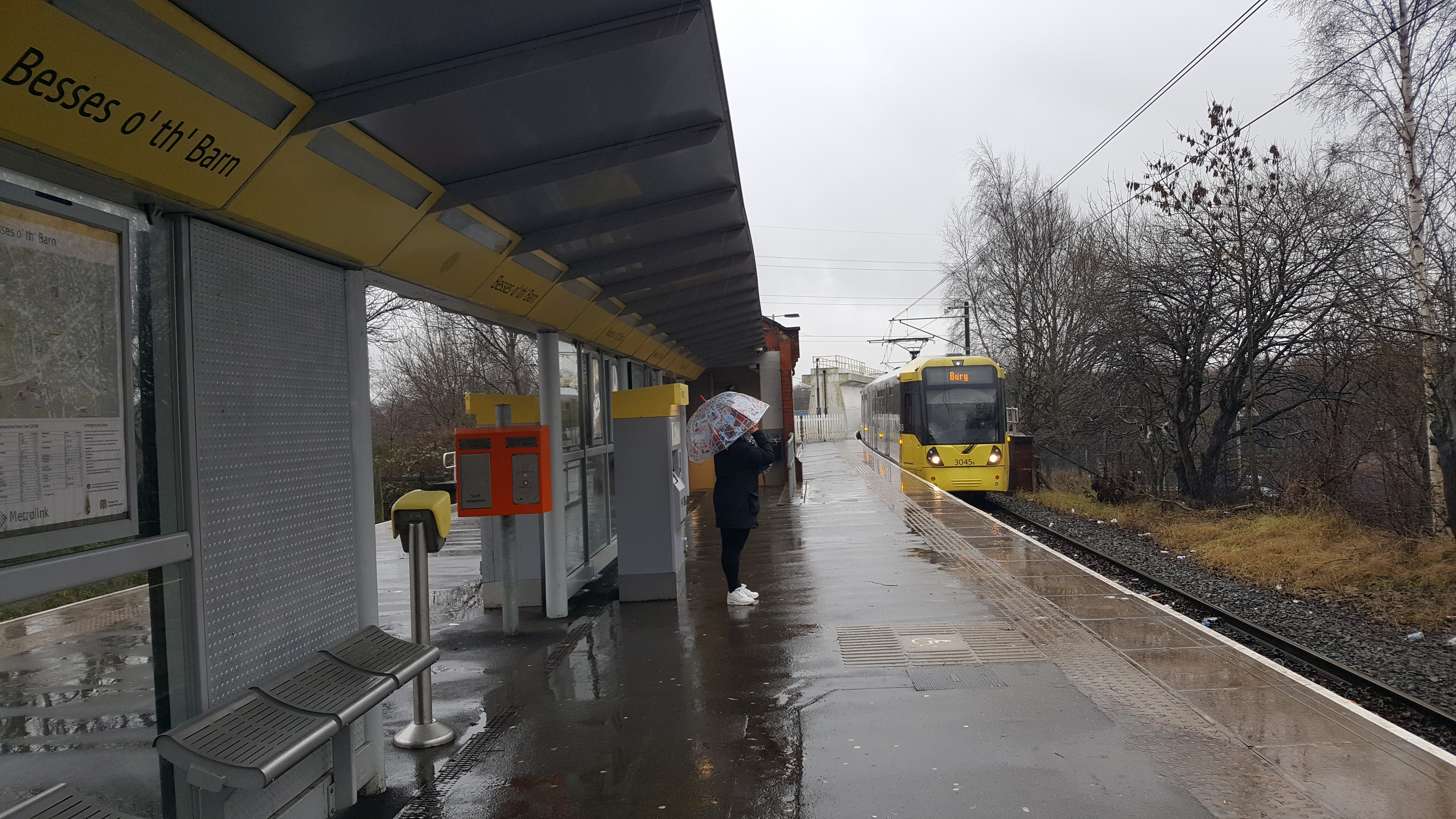
- Tram arriving at Besses o'th' Barn in Jan 2017

General information
- Location: Besses o' th' Barn, Bury; England
- Coordinates: 53.54202°N 2.28610°W
- Grid reference: SD811050
- System: Metrolink station
- Line: Bury Line
- Platforms: 2

Other information
- Status: In operation
- Fare zone: 3

History
- Opened: 1 February 1933
- Original company: London, Midland and Scottish Railway
- Post-grouping: London, Midland and Scottish Railway; British Rail

Key dates
- 6 April 1992: Conversion to Metrolink operation
Location

Besses o' th' Barn is a tram stop in the suburban area of Besses o' th' Barn, Greater Manchester, England. It is on the Bury Line of Greater Manchester's light rail Metrolink system.

== History ==
Although the line was built in 1879 by the Lancashire & Yorkshire Railway, it was not until 1 February 1933 that Besses o' th' Barn railway station was opened by the London, Midland and Scottish Railway, to cater for a large new housing development in the area. In 1992 the station, which had been on the British Rail network, was transferred to the Metrolink network. The station is in the network's Ticketing Zone 3. It is unique, as it is the only original station on the Bury-Manchester line to have one island platform.

The original Totem Signs were the one of two to include lower case lettering, the other being London Road (Guildford).

== Services ==
Services mostly run every 12 minutes on 2 routes, forming a 6-minute service between Bury and Manchester at peak times.

Preceding station	Manchester Metrolink	Following station
Prestwich towards Altrincham	Altrincham–Bury (peak only)	Whitefield towards Bury
Prestwich towards Piccadilly	Piccadilly–Bury	Whitefield towards Bury

== Connections ==
Go North West's frequent 135 service runs between Bury and Manchester and stops adjacent to the station, as well as the Route 97 which runs between Bury and Manchester via Unsworth. Route 95, operated by Go North West runs between Pendleton and Whitefield and calls next to Besses United Reformed Church as does the Route 98, operated by Go North West which runs between Bury and Manchester via Radcliffe and Prestwich. Arriva North West 484 service also ran to Whitefield and to Eccles via Swinton until Late 2020.
