= Whitefield tram stop =

Manchester Metrolink tram stop

Whitefield
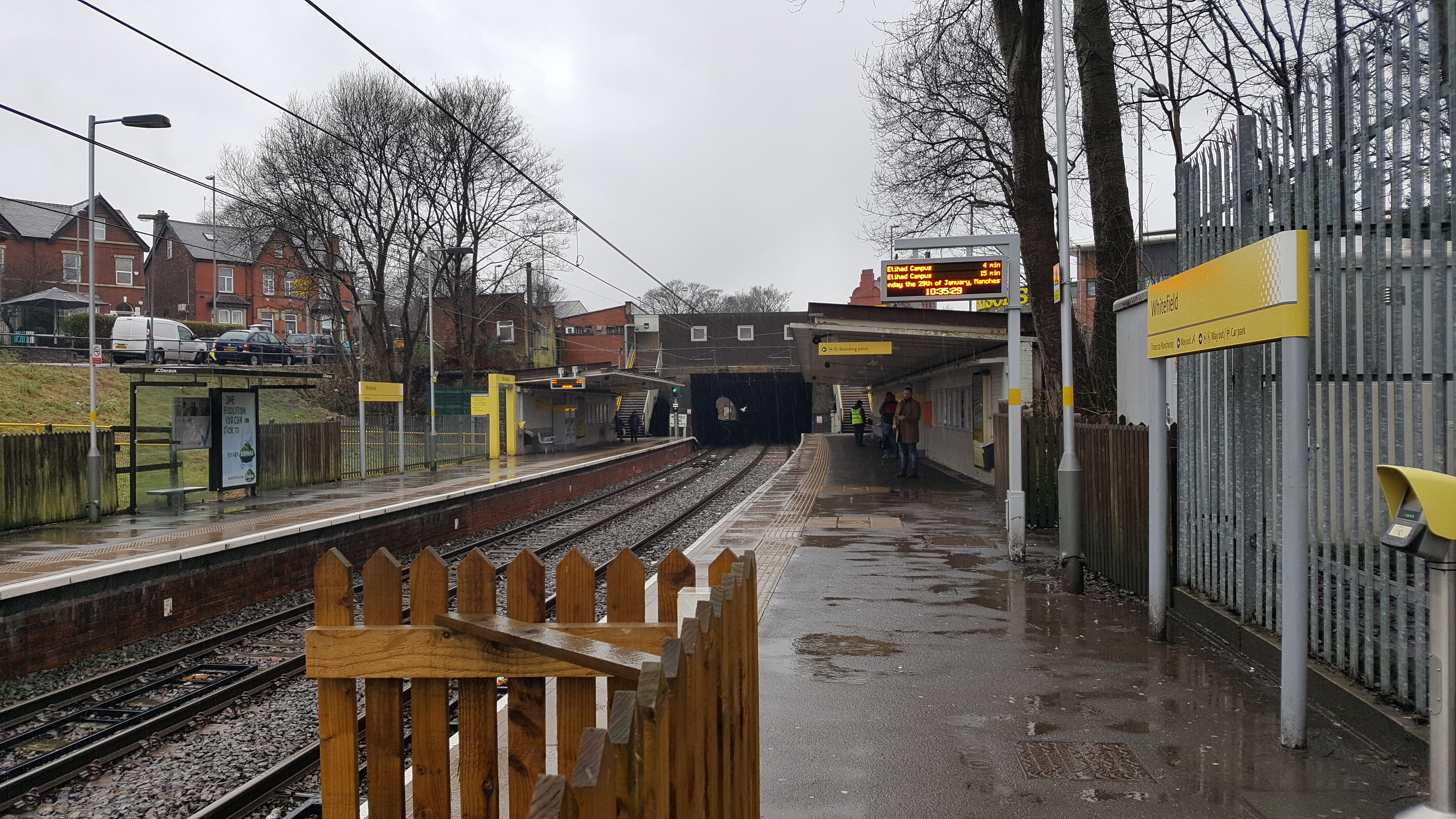
- Whitefield tram stop in 2017.

General information
- Location: Whitefield, Bury; England
- Coordinates: 53.55117°N 2.29510°W
- Grid reference: SD805060
- System: Metrolink station
- Line: Bury Line
- Platforms: 2

Other information
- Status: In operation
- Fare zone: 3/4

History
- Opened: 1 September 1879
- Original company: Lancashire and Yorkshire Railway
- Pre-grouping: Lancashire and Yorkshire Railway
- Post-grouping: London, Midland and Scottish Railway

Key dates
- 17 August 1991: Closed as a rail station
- 6 April 1992: Conversion to Metrolink operation
Route map
Location

Whitefield tram stop is in Whitefield, Greater Manchester, England, on the Bury Line of Greater Manchester's light rail Metrolink system.

== History ==
Formerly Whitefield railway station on the Manchester Victoria to Bury heavy rail line, the station was converted and opened for Metrolink use on 6 April 1992. It lies in ticketing zones 3 and 4. Extensive park and ride facilities were built in 2015 along with a new terminal for the old bus interchange. The area around the station was redeveloped, and is centred on a new Morrisons supermarket.

== Services ==
Services mostly run every 12 minutes on 2 routes, forming a 6-minute service between Bury and Manchester at peak times.

Preceding station	Manchester Metrolink	Following station
Besses o' th' Barn towards Altrincham	Altrincham–Bury (peak only)	Radcliffe towards Bury
Besses o' th' Barn towards Piccadilly	Piccadilly–Bury	Radcliffe towards Bury

== Connecting bus routes ==
Whitefield is well served by buses, with some services stopping outside the station. The Bee Network's 98 and 135 services both stop on nearby Bury New Road and run between Bury and Manchester with the 98 running via Radcliffe and Prestwich and the 135 service, which runs frequently via Heaton Park and Cheetham Hill. The Bee Network also runs Monday-Saturday services on the 95 which runs between Bury and Salford via Unsworth, Prestwich and Carr Clough.

== Gallery ==
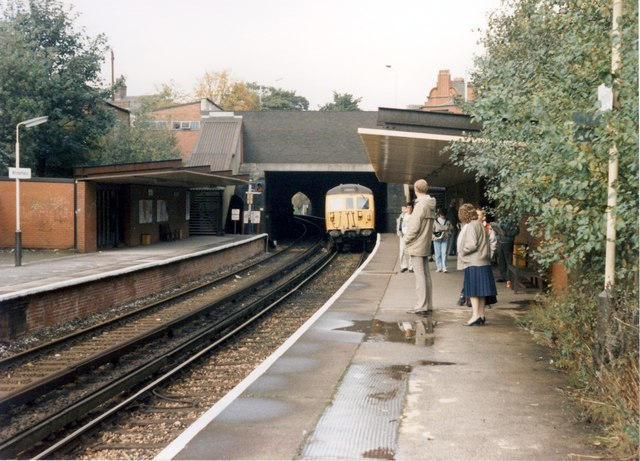
Whitefield railway station in 1988

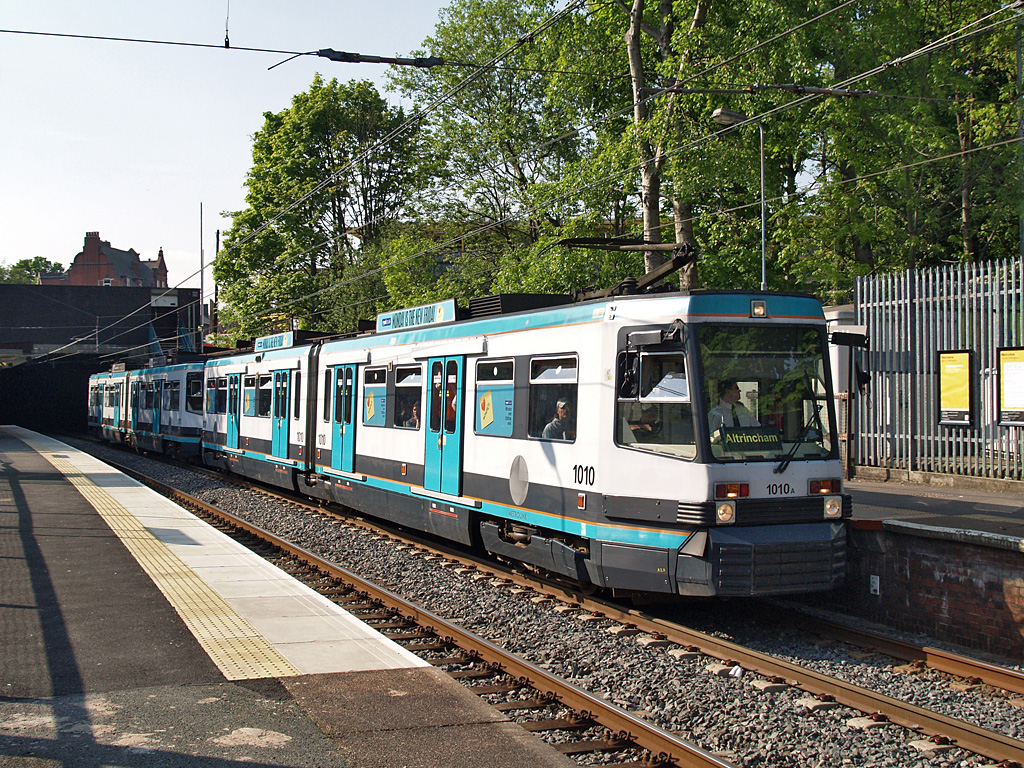
A T-68 stops at Whitefield tram stop in 2008.
