= Crumpsall tram stop =

Manchester Metrolink tram stop

Crumpsall
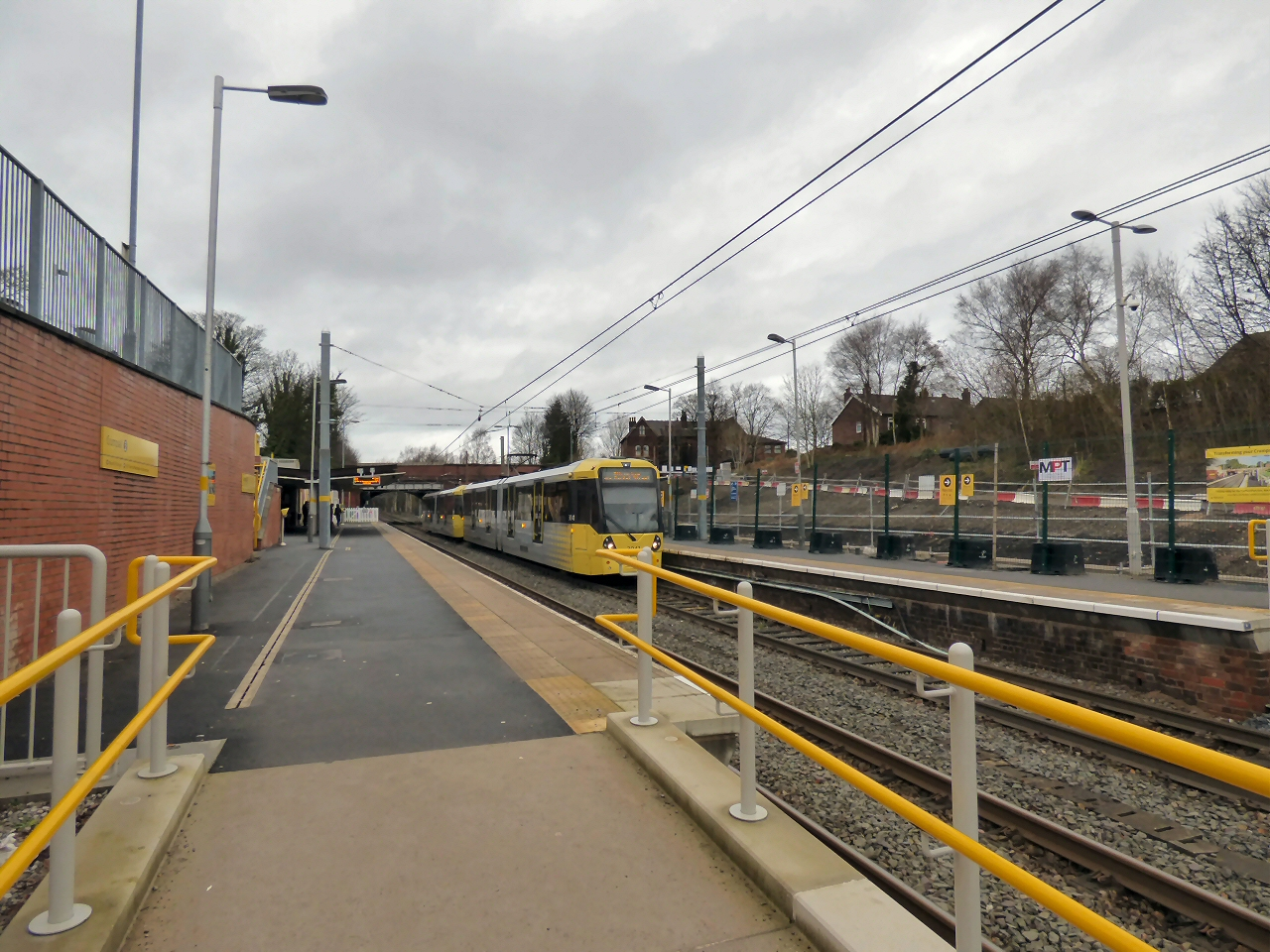
- Crumpsall in 2019 during the third platform construction.

General information
- Location: Crumpsall, City of Manchester; England
- Coordinates: 53.51725°N 2.24102°W
- Grid reference: SD841023
- System: Manchester Metrolink
- Operator: KeolisAmey
- Transit authority: Transport for Greater Manchester
- Line: Bury Line
- Platforms: 3
- Tram routes

Construction
- Structure type: Below-grade
- Accessible: Yes

Other information
- Status: In operation, unstaffed
- Station code: CRP
- Fare zone: 2
- Website: Crumpsall tram stop

History
- Opened: 6 April 1992; 34 years ago (Metrolink)
- Original company: Lancashire & Yorkshire Railway
- Pre-grouping: Lancashire & Yorkshire Railway
- Post-grouping: London, Midland & Scottish Railway; British Rail

Key dates
- 1 September 1879: Opened as rail station
- 17 August 1991: Closed as rail station
- 6 April 1992: Opened to Metrolink
Route map
Location

Crumpsall is a Manchester Metrolink tram stop in Crumpsall, Manchester. It is on the Bury Line and in fare zone 2. This stop was opened to Metrolink on 6 April 1992, after previously serving as a railway station from 1879 to 1991. This stop has step-free access.

The stop is located below-grade, the platforms south of and perpendicular to the Crumpsall Lane road bridge. It is the closest Metrolink stop to North Manchester General Hospital's main entrance, though Abraham Moss tram stop is closer to other areas and entrances to the hospital.

== History ==
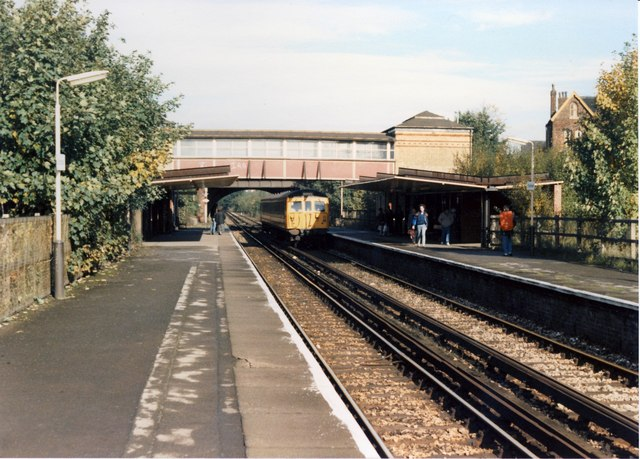
A train arriving at Crumpsall taken from the Bury platform in October 1988.

Crumpsall opened to the Lancashire and Yorkshire Railway on 1 September 1879 with two platforms, as part of a new line running from Radcliffe down to Bury which connected the present Bury to Rawtenstall and Bacup route to suburbs between Manchester and Bury.

The line between Manchester and Bury underwent several modifications over the years. The route between Bury Interchange (a new terminus that ran directly into Bury town centre instead of Bury Bolton Street on the town centre's edge) and Manchester Victoria was closed to British Rail traffic in two halves: first between Manchester Victoria and Crumpsall after 13 July 1991 (Crumpsall remained open serving trains to Bury), then Crumpsall to Bury Interchange after 16 August 1991. The site reopened as a Metrolink station on 6 April 1992 with the rest of the Bury Line.

The station installed cycle lockers in July 2011.

In May 2015, the GMCA released a report into the potential building of the Trafford Park Line. Crumpsall would be the other terminus of the Trafford Park route whenever the line was constructed. To allow this, a third platform was to be built at Crumpsall. In July 2017, it was announced that works would commence. In December 2017 works began.

This also saw the construction of a new foot crossing at the bottom of the platforms, completed on 7 February 2018, to replace the footbridge (which was then demolished two days later), meaning at that time, the Manchester-bound platform was only accessible via the foot-crossing south of the platforms. Over the April 2019 bank holiday, a crossover track was added south of the station, then over the May 2019 bank holiday weekend, the Manchester platform was resurfaced, and the boarding point tiles were added to the new platform. Two waiting shelters were installed on the south end of platforms 2 and 3. The basic concrete foundations for the stair and ramp access to Crumpsall Lane from platform 3, were also added. The platform became ready for passenger service in August 2019.

Crumpsall's third platform has not been used in regular service since it opened in August 2019, likely due to constraints regarding service capacity on other lines. The Trafford Park Line since it opened in March 2020 has instead operated services from The Trafford Centre as far as Cornbrook until 30 November 2022 when services were extended to Deansgate-Castlefield, with no publicity from TfGM about the change. Starting 30 March 2026, a temporary timetable change means that services from The Trafford Centre will now regularly operate as far as Crumpsall (using the third platform) until autumn 2026.

== Layout ==
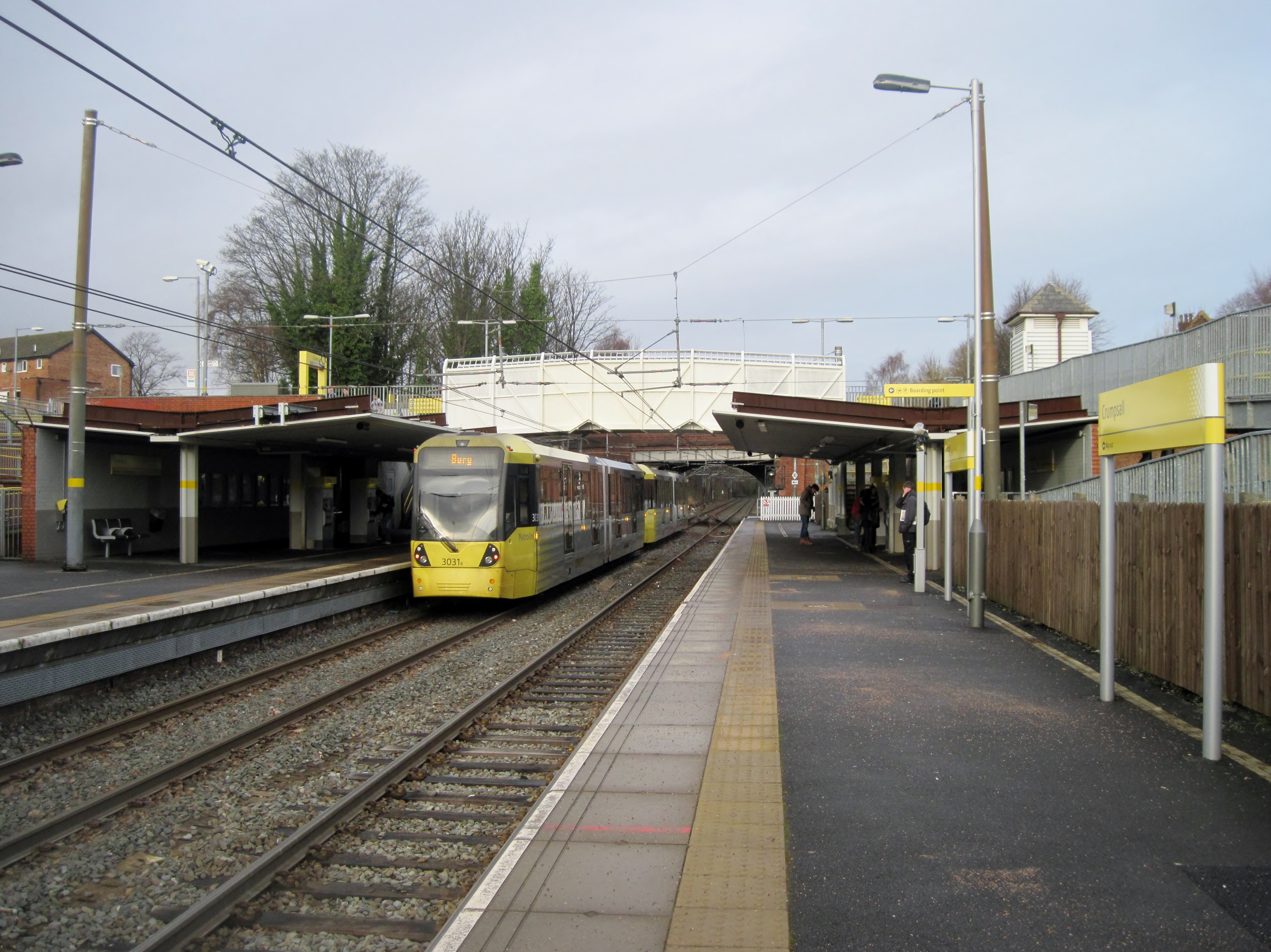
View of the stop taken from the Manchester platform, December 2013.

=== Tram stop ===
Crumpsall tram stop has three platforms. It had disabled and step-free access features added to it since it opened to Metrolink, and it is now fully step-free. The step-free access ramp to platform 1 occupies space previously held by Crumpsall's station building which was demolished in the early 2000s. There is a foot crossing south of the platforms giving access to platform 1, the island platform 2 and 3, and the disabled access ramp from Crumpsall Lane.

During the construction of the third platform, the abandoned British Rail platforms south of the station were entirely removed. Some of the abandoned railway platform survives to the north of the Metrolink platforms, though, since the current fleet of trams (Bombardier M5000s) only require a minimum of 54 metres of platform to operate.

Two dot matrix passenger information displays stand serving one platform each, and show estimated arrival times for trams in minutes up to 30 minutes prior (up to three at a time) and number of carriages.

=== Track layout ===
Crumpsall has a crossover track to the north of platforms 1 and 2, which trains – and then of course trams – would use during service disruptions. It isn't used anymore after the addition of the third platform, which required a new crossover to be installed to the south of the station, which allows trams from Manchester access to the third platform. Platform 3's track continues for a while north of the platform, the extra track acting as a stabling siding whenever needed. The track layout is identical to Shaw and Crompton on the Rochdale Line.

== Services ==
Every route across the Manchester Metrolink network operates to a 12-minute headway (5 tph) Monday–Saturday, and to a 15-minute headway (4 tph) on Sundays and bank holidays. Sections served by a second "peak only" route (like this stop) will have a combined headway of 6 minutes during peak times.

Crumpsall is located in Zone 2, and the stop itself has three platforms. Trams towards Piccadilly depart from platform 2 (the middle platform) and an extra service runs direct to Altrincham during peak times. Trams to Bury stop at platform 1 (west). Platform 3 (east) currently runs no regular service, but is sometimes used during service disruptions.

| Preceding station | Manchester Metrolink | Following station |
|---|---|---|
| Abraham Moss towards Altrincham | Altrincham–Bury (peak only) | Bowker Vale towards Bury |
| Abraham Moss towards Piccadilly | Piccadilly–Bury | Bowker Vale towards Bury |

Replacement bus services run to bus stops Crumpsall Metrolink Stop A towards Manchester and Stop B towards Bury on Crumpsall Lane.

== Transport connections ==
=== Bus ===
This tram stop is served closest by Bee Network bus route 41 (Sale–Middleton) on Crumpsall Lane.

=== Train ===
This tram stop is not connected to or near to any railway stations, but the nearest is Manchester Victoria, approximately 2.5 miles (4.0 km) away walking.

== See also ==
- North Manchester General Hospital
- Trafford Park Line
