= Abraham Moss tram stop =

Manchester Metrolink tram stop

Abraham Moss
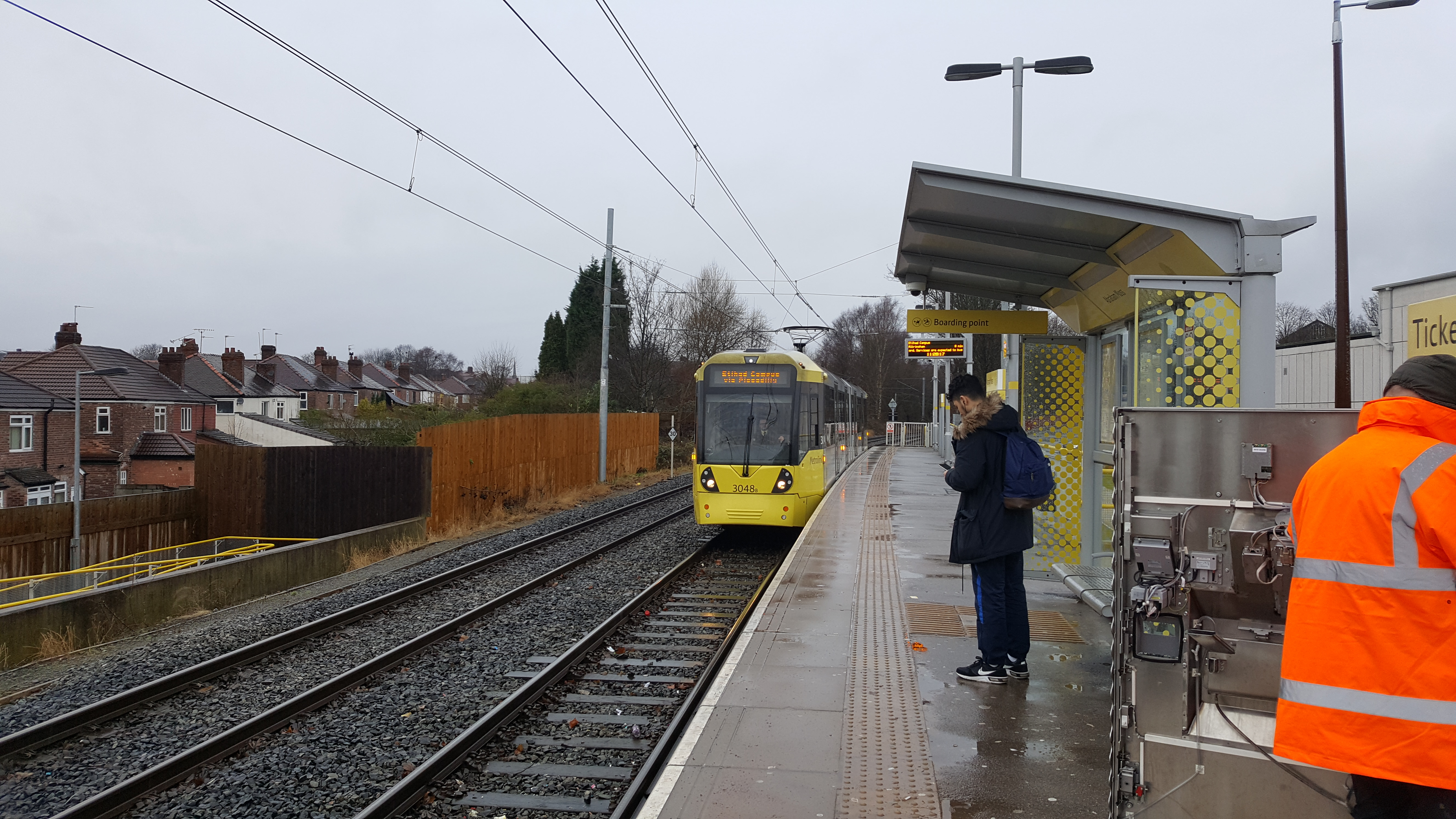
- A M5000 arriving at Abraham Moss tram stop in January 2017.

General information
- Location: Cheetham Hill, City of Manchester; England
- Coordinates: 53.51068°N 2.23572°W
- System: Metrolink station
- Line: Bury Line
- Platforms: 2

Other information
- Status: In operation
- Fare zone: 2

History
- Opened: 18 April 2011
- Original company: Manchester Metrolink
Route map
Location

Abraham Moss is a tram stop in the suburban area of Cheetham Hill, Greater Manchester, England. It is on the Bury Line of Greater Manchester's light rail Metrolink system. The station gained funding approval in 2010 and replaced nearby Woodlands Road stop. It is close to the local library and college campus. The planning application for the station was lodged June 2010. Construction began on 18 October 2010 and the station became operational on 18 April 2011.

== Services ==
Services mostly run every 12 minutes on 2 routes, forming a 6-minute service between Bury and Manchester at peak times.

Preceding station	Manchester Metrolink	Following station
Queens Road towards Altrincham	Altrincham–Bury (peak only)	Crumpsall towards Bury
Queens Road towards Piccadilly	Piccadilly–Bury	Crumpsall towards Bury

== Connecting bus services ==
Abraham Moss is served by several bus services on Crescent Road. First Greater Manchester/JPT services 88 and 89 run a circular route to Manchester either via Cheetham Hill or via North Manchester General Hospital, Higher Blackley and White Moss. Another First service, the 149, also runs to Manchester via Broughton and also runs to Oldham via Moston and Hollinwood.

First service 52 runs westbound to Pendleton via Cheetham Hill and Broughton and eastbound to Failsworth via Harpurhey and Newton Heath. First service 53 terminates nearby at Cheetham Hill and runs to Pendleton via North Manchester General Hospital, Harpurhey, Beswick, Gorton, University of Manchester and Old Trafford. First service 154 runs to Bury via Prestwich, while Stagecoach Manchester service 151 runs to Hollinwood via Harpurhey and Failsworth

Since the introduction of the Bee Network franchise system, revised services are provided by Stagecoach Manchester and Diamond Bus North West, the latter operating service 151.

== See also ==
- Abraham Moss
