= Crumpsall =

Suburb of Manchester, England

- Electoral ward
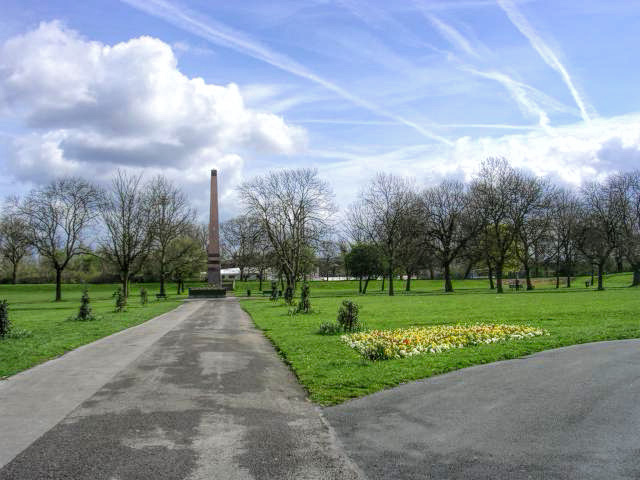
- The obelisk in Crumpsall Park

- Coat of arms
- Motto: By wisdom and effort
- Interactive map of Crumpsall
- Coordinates: 53.5167°N 2.2417°W
- Sovereign state: United Kingdom
- Constituent country: England
- Region: North West
- County: Greater Manchester
- Metropolitan borough: Manchester
- Created: Inc.1890

Government UK Parliament constituency: Blackley and Middleton South
  - Type: Unicameral
  - Body: Manchester City Council
  - Leader of the council: Bev Craig (Labour)
  - Councillor: Fiaz Riasat (Labour)
  - Councillor: Nasrin Ali (Labour)
  - Councillor: Jawad Amin (Labour)

Population
  - Total: 15,959
- Area and population statistics from the 2011 Census

Crumpsall is an outer suburb and electoral ward of Manchester, in Greater Manchester, England, 3 miles (5 km) north of Manchester city centre, bordered by Cheetham Hill, Blackley, Harpurhey, Broughton, and Prestwich. The population at the 2011 census was 15,959. Historically part of Lancashire, Crumpsall was a township within the parish of Manchester, Salford hundred. North Manchester General Hospital is in Crumpsall.

== History ==
The name Crumpsall derives from old English and means a "crooked piece of land beside a river". It is first mentioned in 1291. In 1472, Crumpsall was held in socage by James Radcliffe subject to an annual rent of ten shillings. It later passed to the family of Edward Coke who held it until 1789 when it was divided. One part was sold to Thomas Egerton, 1st Earl of Wilton and another, 188 acres (76 hectares), to William Marsden of Liverpool. Marsden's portion was divided into three farms: Boardman's Tenement, Pendleton Tenement and Oldham's Tenement and a dyeworks known as Holland's Tenement. Oldham's Tenement, 45 acres (18 hectares), was sold to the Guardians of the Poor of Manchester in 1855 as a site for the new workhouse, later known as Springfield Hospital. Pendleton Tenement was bought by the Delaunay family and later sold to the Prestwich Poor law union as the site for a workhouse.

Crumpsall was rural in character during the early part of the 19th century, however, the necessity to house Manchester's growing population of mill workers saw the area become more urbanised. Crumpsall was incorporated into the city of Manchester in 1890.

Crumpsall Hall was the seat of the Chethams and subsequently passed to the Waklyns. The Manchester workhouse was built after the formation of the Poor Law Unions in 1837.

The Co-operative Wholesale Society opened the Crumpsall Biscuit Works in Lower Crumpsall around 1873.

Crumpsall is the location of North Manchester General Hospital. This was previously three hospitals: Crumpsall Hospital (a general hospital), Springfield Hospital (a psychiatric hospital) and Delaunay's Hospital (a geriatric hospital).

In January 2003 Detective Constable Stephen Oake, a Greater Manchester Police officer, was fatally stabbed whilst arresting a suspected terrorist in a house on Crumpsall Lane.

During Yom Kippur services on 2 October 2025, a car-ramming and stabbing attack outside the Heaton Park synagogue left at least two people dead and three people seriously injured. Armed police responded within about seven minutes, shooting the suspect and (accidentally) a worshipper.

== Governance ==
Crumpsall was formerly a township in the parish of Manchester, in the Salford hundred in the historic county of Lancashire. It was part of the Manchester Poor Law Union (PLU) between 1841 and 1850, the Prestwich PLU from 1850 to 1915, and again in the Manchester PLU from 1915 to 1930. In 1854 a Local Board of Health was established for the area of the township. In 1866 Crumpsall became a separate civil parish, in 1890 it was incorporated into County Borough of Manchester, on 26 March 1896 the parish was abolished to form North Manchester. In 1891 the parish had a population of 10,371.

Councillors

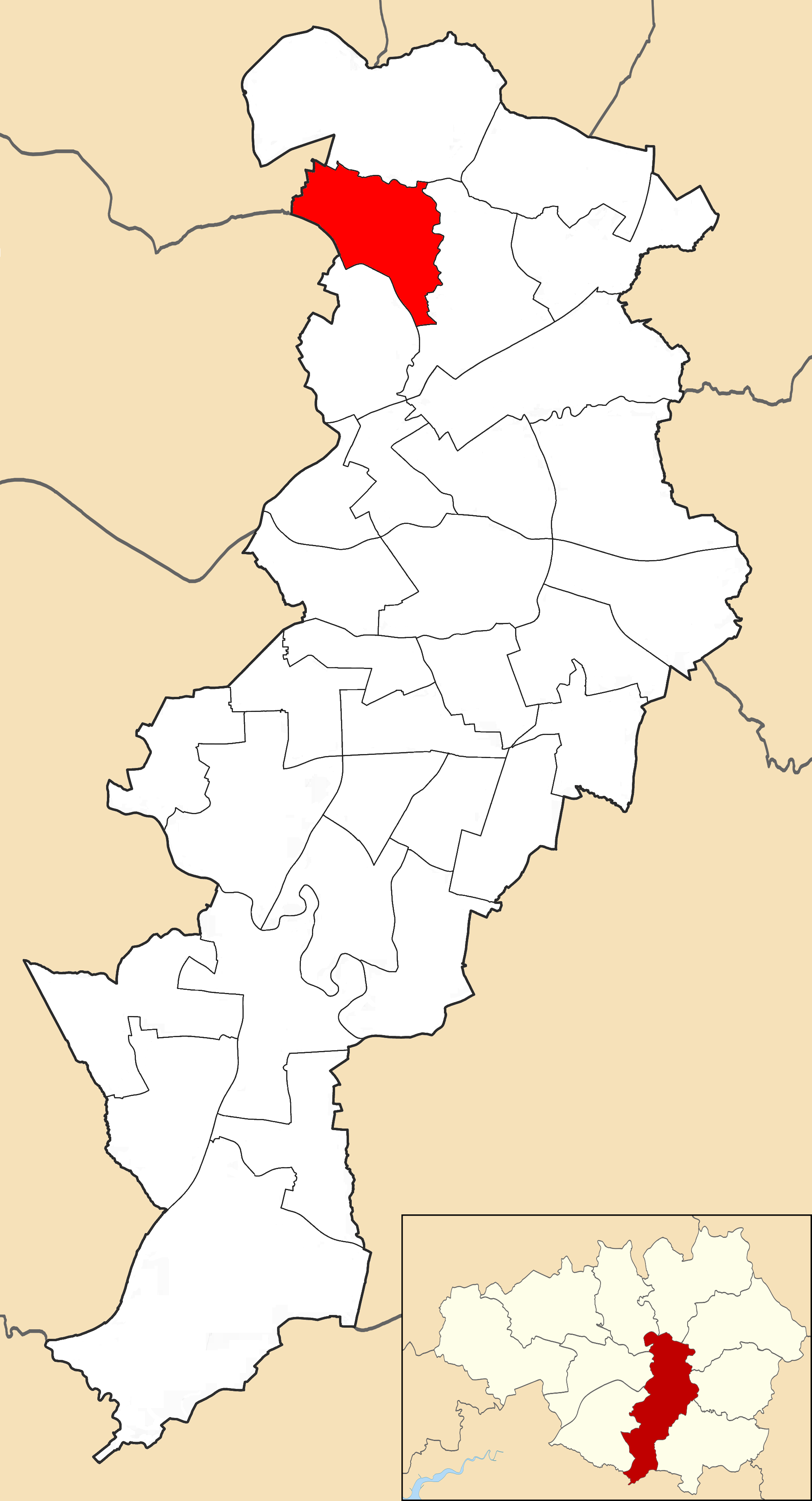
Crumpsall electoral ward within Manchester City Council.

Crumpsall is represented on Manchester City Council by three Labour Councillors, Fiaz Riasat, Nasrin Ali and Jawad Amin. Riasat and Ali have held their seats since 2018, while Amin has been the third councillor since 2022, following the resignation of former Manchester City Council leader Richard Leese.

Election	Councillor	Councillor	Councillor
2004	Jon-Leigh Pritchard (Lab)	Con Keegan (Lab)	Richard Leese (Lab)
2006	Jon-Leigh Pritchard (Lab)	Con Keegan (Lab)	Richard Leese (Lab)
2007	Jon-Leigh Pritchard (Lab)	Con Keegan (Lab)	Richard Leese (Lab)
2008	Jon-Leigh Pritchard (Lab)	Con Keegan (Lab)	Richard Leese (Lab)
2010	Jon-Leigh Pritchard (Lab)	Con Keegan (Lab)	Richard Leese (Lab)
2011	Jon-Leigh Pritchard (Lab)	Con Keegan (Lab)	Richard Leese (Lab)
2012	Jon-Leigh Pritchard (Lab)	Con Keegan (Lab)	Richard Leese (Lab)
2014	Jon-Leigh Pritchard (Lab)	Con Keegan (Lab)	Richard Leese (Lab)
2015	Jon-Leigh Pritchard(Lab)	Beth Marshall (Lab)	Richard Leese (Lab)
2016	Jon-Leigh Pritchard (Lab)	Beth Marshall (Lab)	Richard Leese (Lab)
2018	Fiaz Riasat (Lab)	Nasrin Ali (Lab)	Richard Leese (Lab)
2019	Fiaz Riasat (Lab)	Nasrin Ali (Lab)	Richard Leese (Lab)
2021	Fiaz Riasat (Lab)	Nasrin Ali (Lab)	Richard Leese (Lab)
Jan 2022	Fiaz Riasat (Lab)	Nasrin Ali (Lab)	Vacant
2022	Fiaz Riasat (Lab)	Nasrin Ali (Lab)	Jawad Amin (Lab)
2023	Fiaz Riasat (Lab)	Nasrin Ali (Lab)	Jawad Amin (Lab)
2024	Fiaz Riasat (Lab)	Nasrin Ali (Lab)	Jawad Amin (Lab)
2026	Fiaz Riasat (Lab)	Nasrin Ali (Lab)	Jawad Amin (Lab)

indicates seat up for re-election.

=== Parliament ===
Crumpsall is part of the Blackley and Middleton South parliamentary constituency (formerly Blackley and Broughton), and has been represented since 1997 by Labour Member of Parliament (MP) Graham Stringer.

== Geography ==
Crumpsall is divided into Higher and Lower Crumpsall. Lower Crumpsall is situated in the Irk Valley, which forms its northern boundary with the neighbouring suburb of Blackley at Tetlow Bridge.

The main routes through the district are Crescent Road, Cravenwood Road, Delaunay's Road, Cleveland Road, Crumpsall Lane, Middleton Road, Lansdowne Road (the main shopping area with the post office), one half of Bury Old Road between Melton Road and Woodlands Road (the other side of the road being in the Kersal ward of Salford) and Ash Tree Road (bounded on the east side by Crumpsall Park).

== Demography ==
'Demography of Crumpsall'
UK Census 2001	Crumpsall	Manchester	England
Total population	11,363	392,819	49,138,831
White or White British	67%	81%	91%
Asian or Asian British	18%	9%	5%
Black or Black British	3%	5%	2%
Other	1%	2%	0.89%

According to the 2001 national census, the ward has a population of 11,363, and religious affiliation was the following:

- Christian – 52.05%
- Muslim – 17.26%
- Jewish – 8.99%
- Sikh – 1.00%
- No religion or other (including Buddhist and Hindu) – 20.47%

== Religion ==
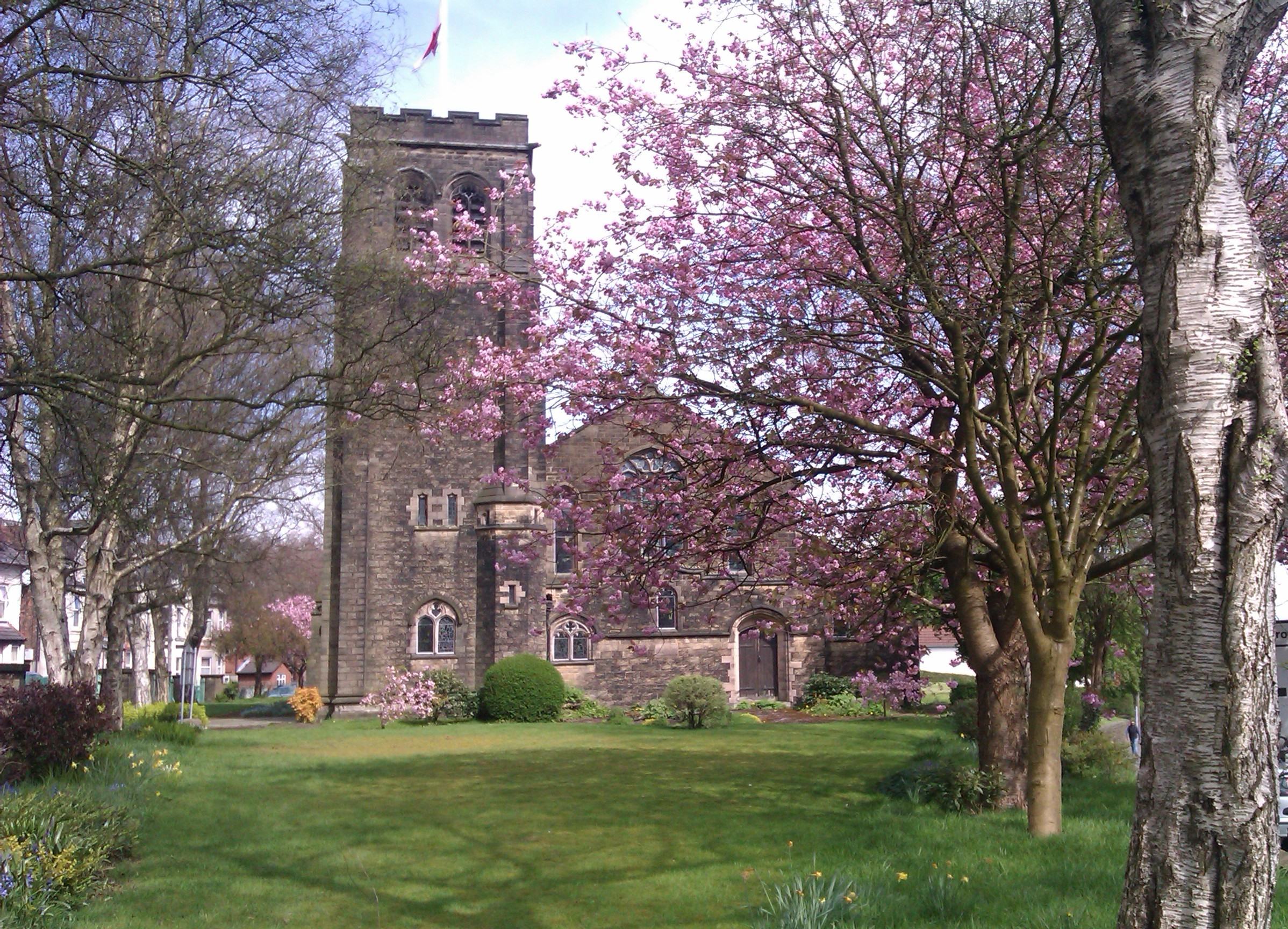
Parish church of St Matthew with St Mary on Cleveland Road

St Thomas's Church was founded in 1863 and after the closure of St Mark's in Cheetham in 1982 its dedication was changed to St Thomas with St. Mark. There is a war memorial in the churchyard commemorating those who died in the First World War.

In Higher Crumpsall, there are several places of worship including St Anne's Catholic Church, Crumpsall Methodist Church, St Matthew with St Mary CofE Church and Heaton Park Hebrew Congregation Synagogue.

== Education ==
Primary education is provided by Bowker Vale Primary School, Cravenwood Primary Academy, Crumpsall Lane Primary School, King David Infant School, King David Junior School, St Anne's RC Primary School and St Thomas Primary School. Secondary education is provided by King David High School. King David Infant School, King David Junior School and King David High School are targeted at Greater Manchester's Orthodox Jewish community, whilst St Anne's RC Primary School is a Roman Catholic institution.

Crumpsall Lane Primary School is a two form entry school with two reception classes and a nursery. The head teacher is Sally Barrett.

The Abraham Moss Leisure Centre, which is near Abraham Moss Community School, hosts the only college in the area and forms part of the Manchester College network of further education institutions. It was previously part of the network of City College Manchester colleges, before the merger with MANCAT on the 1 August 2008.

== Transport ==
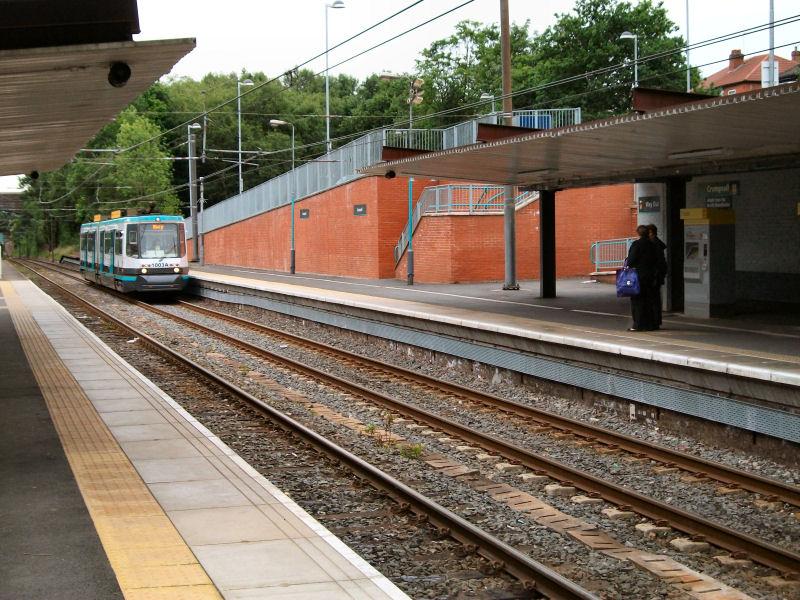
Crumpsall Metrolink station

Crumpsall is currently served by three stations on Manchester Metrolink's Bury line. Crumpsall Metrolink station on Station Road is located in the centre of the ward, whilst Bowker Vale station lies to the north eastern extremity on Middleton Road and borders Higher Blackley and Prestwich. The newest station stop is at Abraham Moss next to the Abraham Moss Leisure Centre, Library, Schools and a campus of Manchester College.

First Greater Manchester, Stagecoach Manchester and Diamond Bus North West, under the Bee Network, operate regular bus services through the ward, via North Manchester General Hospital and onwards to Manchester city centre and other areas of Greater Manchester.

== Voluntary organisations ==
The Friends of Crumpsall Park oversee the development and well-being of the park in conjunction with the city council, Manchester Leisure and the police. They also organise the annual Crumpsall Carnival which takes place on the last Sunday in June.

== Notable people ==
Sir Humphrey Chetham was born in Crumpsall in 1580, the son of a successful Manchester merchant who lived in Crumpsall Hall. He was responsible for the creation of Chetham's Hospital (now Chetham's School of Music) and Chetham's Library, the oldest public library in the English-speaking world, which is located in the city centre.

Actor and singer Don Estelle (Gunner "Lofty" Sugden in It Ain't Half Hot Mum), real name Ronald Edwards, was born 1933 and raised in Crumpsall.

Frontman for the pop band Freddie and the Dreamers, singer Freddie Garrity, was born in Crumpsall in 1936.

The Moors murderer Myra Hindley was born in Crumpsall in 1942.

The folk singer, comedian and broadcaster Mike Harding was born in the area in 1944.

Howard Jacobson was brought up in Crumpsall and some of his novels, Kalooki Nights and The Mighty Walzer, feature descriptions of Jewish life in the area.

Akinwale Arobieke, known as Purple Aki, an English convicted criminal, was born in Crumpsall in 1961.

Bassist Gary "Mani" Mounfield of the Stone Roses was born in Crumpsall in 1962.

Jeff Hordley, best known for playing Cain Dingle in Emmerdale, was born in Crumpsall in 1970.

Jason Orange of the boy band Take That was born at North Manchester General Hospital in Crumpsall in 1970.

English grime artist Aaron Davis (stage name Bugzy Malone) was born in Crumpsall in 1990.

Pakistan-born Mohammed Zahid, of, Station Road, Crumpsall, A grooming gang ringleader who raped schoolgirls in Rochdale and has been jailed for 35 years.

== See also ==
- Listed buildings in Manchester-M8
