= Manchester Fort =

Retail park in Manchester, England

Coordinates: 53°29′50.748″N 2°14′5.316″W

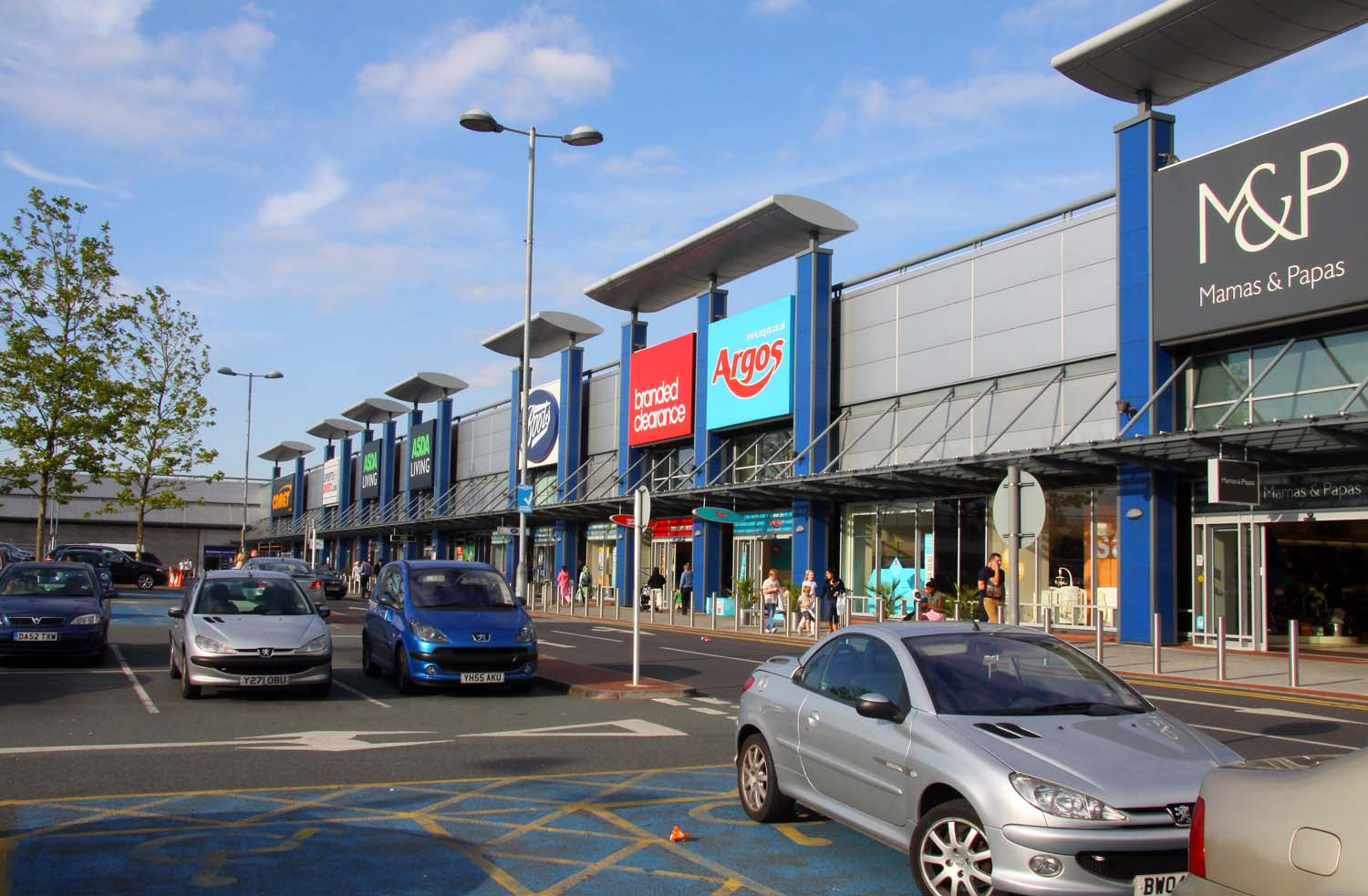
Retail outlets at Manchester Fort.

Manchester Fort is a retail park in Cheetham Hill, Manchester, England, which includes 36 units with a total floorspace of 325,000 sq ft. It opened in 2005 and its anchors included B&Q and TK Maxx.

Henderson Global Investors purchased Manchester Fort in 2011 from the Universities Superannuation Scheme pension fund.
