= John Bingham, 4th Baron Clanmorris =

English landowner and aristocrat

John Bingham
- Baron Clanmorris
- Born: November 28, 1826
- Died: 5 April 1876 (aged 49–50)
- Spouse: Sarah Persse (.)
- Father: Denis Bingham, 3rd Baron Clanmorris
- Mother: Maria Persse
- Occupation: Landowner

John Charles Robert Bingham, 4th Baron Clanmorris (28 November 1826 – 5 April 1876), was an Anglo-Irish landowner and aristocrat.

== Early life ==
Bingham was born on 28 November 1826 at Moyode Castle, County Galway. He was the son of Denis Bingham, 3rd Baron Clanmorris and Maria Helena Persse. Among his siblings was Hon. Albert Yelverton Bingham, the Deputy Lieutenant of County Mayo. His paternal grandparents were John Bingham, 1st Baron Clanmorris and Hon. Anna Maria Yelverton (a daughter of the 1st Viscount Avonmore). His maternal grandparents were Robert Persse and Maria Wade.

He was educated at Rugby School, in Warwickshire.

== Career ==
Upon the death of his father on 24 February 1847, he succeeded as the 4th Baron Clanmorris of Newbrook, in the Peerage of Ireland.

== Personal life ==
Lord Clanmorris was married to Sarah Selina Persse (1826–1907), the fourth daughter of Burton de Burgh Persse, High Sheriff of County Galway, and Matilda "Mattie" Persse (a daughter of Henry Stratford Persse). Together, they were the parents of:

- Hon. Matilda Maria Helena Bingham (1850–1943), who married Albert Brassey, MP for Banbury and son of Thomas Brassey and Maria Farringdon Harrison, in 1871.
- John George Barry Bingham, 5th Baron Clanmorris (1852–1916), who married Matilda Catherine Maude Ward, a daughter of Robert Edward Ward of Bangor Castle and Harriette Ward (a daughter of Rev. Hon. Henry Ward).
- Hon. Burton Percy Bingham (1853–1898), who married Frances Matilda Persse, a daughter of Burton Robert Parsons Persse and Eliza Madaline Persse, in 1895.
- Hon. Bentinck Yelverton Bingham (1855–1892), who died unmarried.
- Hon. Florence Madeline Bingham (1856–1941), who married John Pollok, in 1873. After his death in 1891, she married Maj. James David Barry, son of Charles Robert Barry, the Attorney-General for Ireland, in 1895.
- Hon. Rose Elizabeth Bingham (1858–1935), who married Maj.-Gen. Sir Hugh McCalmont, MP for North Antrim and son of James McCalmont and Emily Anne Martin, in 1885.

Lord Clanmorris died on 5 April 1876 at Lismany, Ballinasloe, the residence of Allan Pollok, Esq.. He was interred in the cemetery in Cregaclare Demesne, his seat in County Galway, the family burying place of the Clanmorris family.

=== Descendants ===
Through his daughter Florence, he was a grandfather of Zara Eileen Pollok (1879–1965), who married Alexander Hore-Ruthven, 1st Earl of Gowrie.

Through his daughter Matilda, he was a grandfather of Iris Hermione Brassey, who married Brig.-Gen. Malcolm Orme Little, a son of Gen. Sir Archibald Little.

Peerage of Ireland
Preceded by Denis Arthur Bingham	Baron Clanmorris; 1847–1876	Succeeded by John George Barry Bingham
