= William Yelverton (disambiguation) =

William Yelverton (1400 – 1470s) was a judge and member of parliament in Norfolk, England.

William Yelverton may also refer to:

- William Yelverton, 2nd Viscount Avonmore (1762-1814), Irish nobleman
- William Yelverton, 4th Viscount Avonmore (1824-1883), Irish nobleman
- William Henry Yelverton (1791-1884), Welsh politician
