= Barry Yelverton =

Barry Yelverton may refer to:

- Barry Yelverton, 1st Viscount Avonmore (1736–1805), Irish judge and politician
- Barry Yelverton, 3rd Viscount Avonmore (1790–1870), Irish nobleman
- Barry Yelverton, 5th Viscount Avonmore (1859–1885), Anglo-Irish peer and army officer
