= William Henry Yelverton =

English politician (1791–1884)

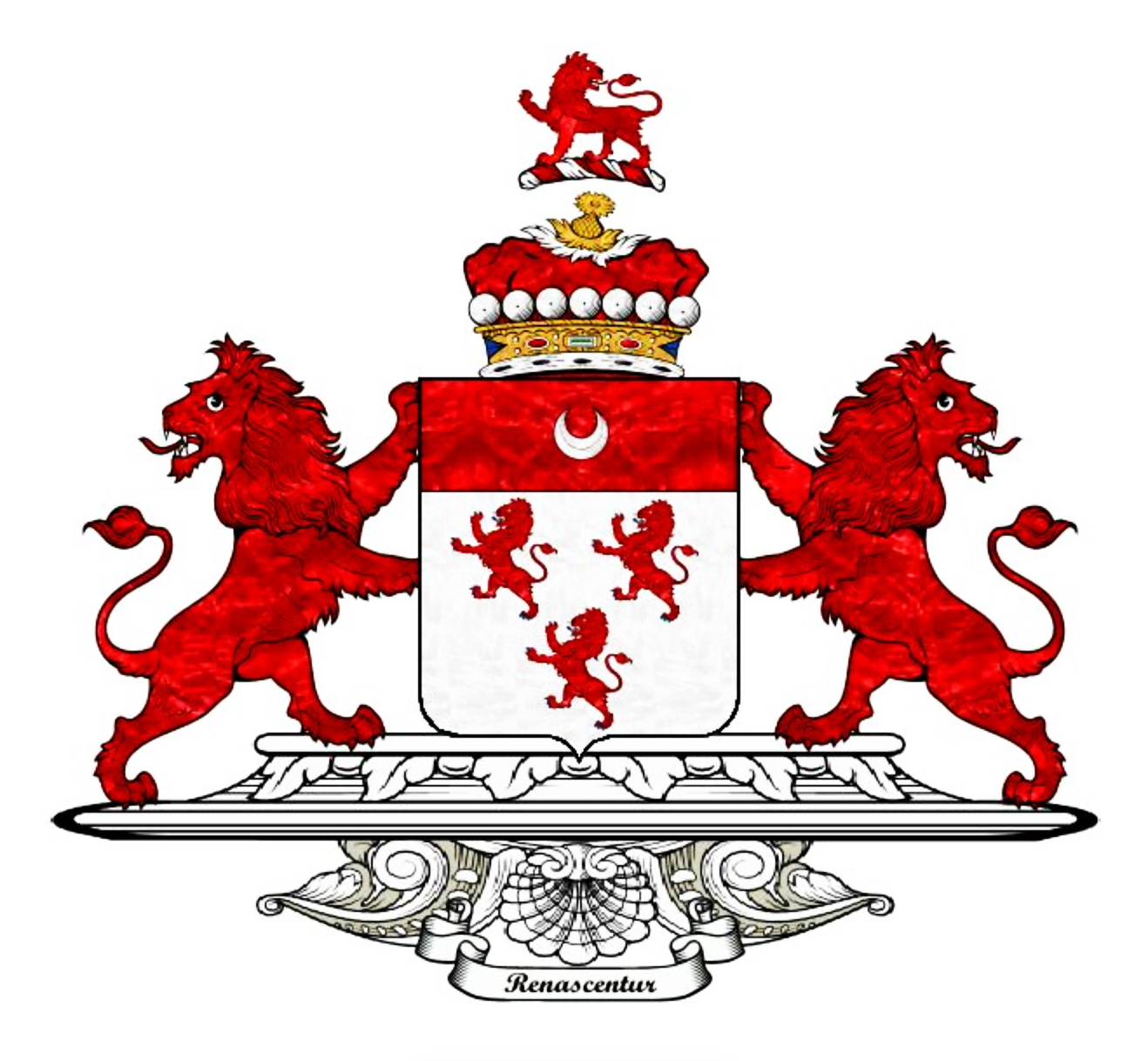
Viscount Avonmore Crest

The Hon. William Henry Yelverton (5 December 1791 – 28 April 1884) was a Whig politician who served as MP for Carmarthen Boroughs from 1832 to 1835. Yelverton inherited considerable lands and industry from his family and from his marriage to Elizabeth Lucy Morgan.

== Early life and education ==
Yelverton was born on 5 December 1791 in Belle Isle Castle, Ireland, to William Charles Yelverton, 2nd Marquess of Avonmore, and his wife Mary, daughter of John Reid. The Yelverton family held the title of Viscount Avonmore.

He was educated at Eton College and enrolled as a student at Brasenose College, Oxford. On 2 June 1825 in Clifton, Gloucester, he married Elizabeth Lucy Morgan, daughter of John Morgan of Furnace. His wife died in 1863; they had one son and three daughters.

In 1811, Yelverton inherited the Blaiddbwll estate by an uncle to his mother, Captain John Parr. The property was built upon through his marriage when he became the owner of the Carmarthen ironworks and colliery, as well as land in the Carmarthen and Llanelli area, which included the estate of Whitland Abbey.

== Political career ==
Yelverton was appointed a Justice of the Peace and Deputy Lieutenant of Carmarthenshire. Yelverton was elected as Member of Parliament of Carmarthen Borough in the 1832 United Kingdom general election, but lost his seat to David Lewis in the 1835 election. Yelverton was High Sheriff of Carmarthenshire in 1853.

He was allegedly one of the landlords who had been responsible for the eviction of tenants after the 1868 general election, where a number of tenants were thrown out of their farms by the landowners for supporting Liberal candidates instead of following the landlord's direction to support the Conservatives.

By 1878, Yelverton had gone to financial difficulties and became bankrupt.

== Thelwell vs. Yelverton ==
In the case of Thelwell vs. Yeltervon, involving the marriage and subsequent divorce of William Henry's nephew (Major William Charles Yelverton, 4th Viscount Avonmore) to a Catholic nurse (Maria Theresa Longworth), William Henry and his family sided with Longworth, thus causing a family rift. Indeed, by 1862, William and Lucy were themselves in court, bringing a case of libel against James Walker, who had written a letter criticising them for continuing to associate with Longworth after the case. According to Walker, Hendy Gwyn's family supported Longworth because, if her marriage to Avonmore had been confirmed as valid, the Viscount's children (from his second marriage) would have been illegitimate - and so their son, William Yelverton, would have been allowed to become heir to estates and viscountcy of Avonmore. Walker accused William Yelverton of behavior so selfish, so base, so unnatural that it is hard to believe its existence. Walker lost the case and had to pay £500 in compensation.
