= Smedley, Manchester =

Coordinates: 53.50478°N 2.22546°W

Smedley is an area of north Manchester, England, on the banks of the River Irk between Cheetham Hill to the west, Collyhurst to the south, Crumpsall to the north and Harpurhey to the east.

In 1819, Samuel Bamford and Henry Hunt stopped at Smedley Cottage, before the Peterloo Massacre, and the Middleton contingent to the demonstration passed by it on their way into Manchester via Collyhurst Road. In the novel The Manchester Man by Isabella Banks, the titular character, Jabez Clegg, is swept in infancy into the River Irk at Smedley Vale.

Theresa Yelverton, a party to the Yelverton case, lived as a child at Merryfield House, at the corner of Queens Road and Smedley Road, overlooking the Irk Valley.

In the early 1930s, Kennet House, a development of modernist flats, was built in Smedley. In 2019, a new footbridge across the Irk opened, linking Smedley to Collyhurst.

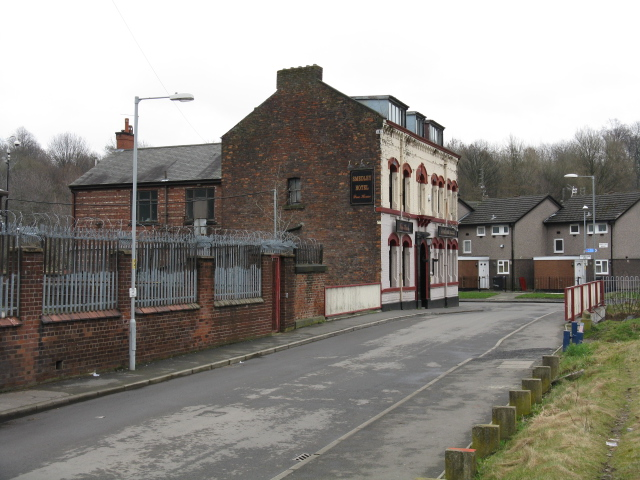
Smedley Hotel, Smedley, Manchester - geograph.org.uk - 1185071
