= Baron Clanmorris =

Title in the Peerage of Ireland

Barony of Clanmorris
- Arms: Azure, a Bend cotised Or, between six Crosses-Pattée Or. Crest: On a Mount, a Falcon rising, all proper. Supporters: On either side a Lion Azure.
- Creation date: 31 July 1800
- Created by: King George III
- Peerage: Peerage of Ireland
- First holder: John Bingham
- Present holder: Derek De Burgh Bingham, 9th Baron Clanmorris
- Remainder to: the 1st Baron’s heirs male of the body lawfully begotten
- Status: Extant
- Motto: SPES MEA CHRISTUS (Christ is my hope)

Baron Clanmorris, of Newbrook in the County of Mayo, is a title in the Peerage of Ireland. It was created on 6 August 1800 for John Bingham. He was a descendant of John Bingham of Foxford in County Mayo, whose brother Sir Henry Bingham, 1st Baronet, of Castlebar, was the ancestor of the Earls of Lucan. The first Baron's great-great-great-grandson, the seventh Baron, was a spy and crime novelist (as John Bingham).

The Hon. Edward Bingham, a younger son of the fifth Baron won the Victoria Cross for his actions during the battle of Jutland. The novelist Charlotte Bingham was the daughter of the seventh and the sister of the eighth Baron Clanmorris. A granddaughter of the fourth Baron was Zara Pollok, who married Alexander Hore-Ruthven who, as 1st Baron Gowrie, was Governor-General of Australia 1936–44.

== Barons Clanmorris (1800) ==
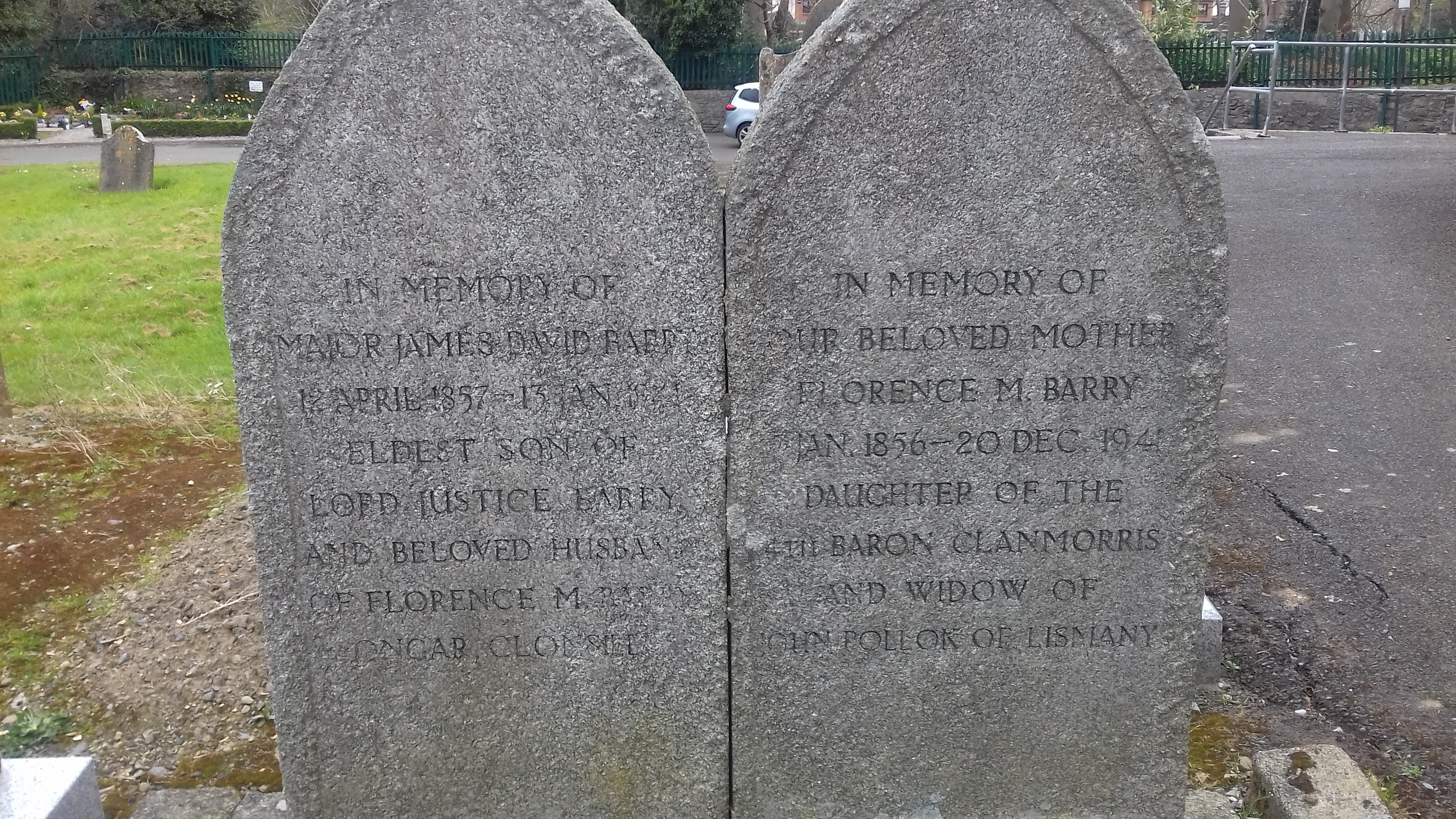
Tombstone of Florence Barry, daughter of the 4th Baron

- John Bingham, 1st Baron Clanmorris (1762–1821)
- Charles Barry Bingham, 2nd Baron Clanmorris (1796–1829)
- Denis Arthur Bingham, 3rd Baron Clanmorris (1808–1847)
- John Charles Robert Bingham, 4th Baron Clanmorris (1826–1876)
- John George Barry Bingham, 5th Baron Clanmorris (1852–1916)
- Arthur Maurice Robert Bingham, 6th Baron Clanmorris (1879–1960)
- John Michael Ward Bingham, 7th Baron Clanmorris (1908–1988)
- Simon John Ward Bingham, 8th Baron Clanmorris (1937–2026)
- Derek De Burgh Bingham, 9th Baron Clanmorris (b. 1942)

== See also ==
- Earl of Lucan
