= List of Grade A listed buildings in County Down =

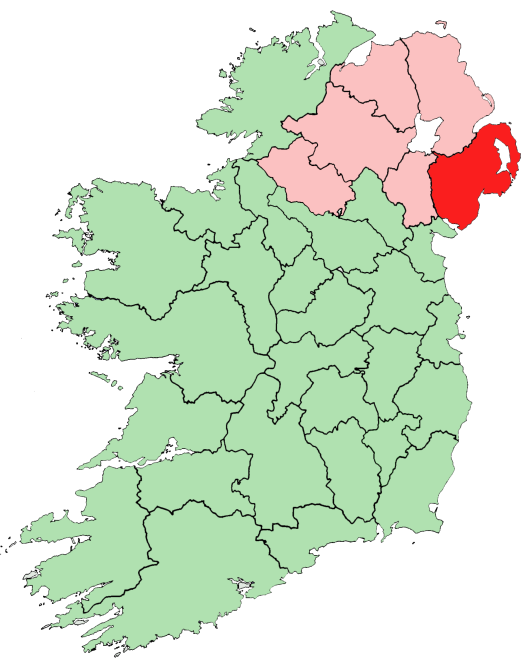
County Down within Ireland

This is a list of Grade A listed buildings in County Down, Northern Ireland.

In Northern Ireland, the term listed building refers to a building or other structure officially designated as being of "special architectural or historic interest". Grade A structures are those considered to be "buildings of greatest importance to Northern Ireland including both outstanding architectural set-pieces and the least altered examples of each representative style, period and type." Once listed, severe restrictions are imposed on the modifications allowed to a building's structure or its fittings. Listed building consent must be obtained from local authorities prior to any alteration to such a structure.

Listing began later in Northern Ireland than in the rest of the UK: the first provision for listing was contained in the Planning (Northern Ireland) Order 1972; and the current legislative basis for listing is the Planning (Northern Ireland) Order 1991. Under Article 42 of the Order, the relevant Department of the Northern Ireland Executive is required to compile lists of buildings of "special architectural or historic interest". Since 2016, the responsibility for the listing process rests with the Historic Environment Division of the Department for Communities (DfC).

Following the introduction of listing, an initial survey of Northern Ireland's building stock was begun in 1974. By the time of the completion of this First Survey in 1994, the listing process had developed considerably, and it was therefore decided to embark upon a Second Survey, which is still ongoing, to update and cross-check the original information. Information gathered during this survey, relating to both listed and unlisted buildings, is entered into the publicly accessible Northern Ireland Buildings Database. A range of listing criteria, which aim to define architectural and historic interest, are used to determine whether or not to list a building.

County Down covers 2,448 square kilometres (945 sq mi), and has a population of around 516,000. The County has 41 Grade A listed buildings.

== Listed buildings ==
Building address	Grid Ref. (Note: Sometimes known as OSGB36, the grid reference is based on the British national grid reference system used by the Ordnance Survey.) Geo-coordinates	Type (Note: The type of structure, as identified by the DfC.)	Local authority	Second Survey	Original Survey	HB Number (Note: The "HB Number" is a unique number assigned to each listed building by the DfC.)	Image	Ref.
Portaferry Presbyterian Church, Meeting House Street, Portaferry	54°22′51″N 5°32′45″W	Church	Ards	A	B+	HB24/01/046	Upload another image See more images	
Rosemount House, Rosemount, Greyabbey	54°32′03″N 5°33′22″W	Country House	Ards	A	A	HB24/04/017 A	Upload Photo	
Ballywalter Park House and garden walling, Ballywalter	54°32′35″N 5°29′32″W	Country House	Ards	A	A	HB24/04/028	Upload Photo	
The Temple of the Winds, Mount Stewart, Newtownards	54°32′47″N 5°35′33″W	Estate Related Structures	Ards	A	A	HB24/04/051	Upload Photo	
Mount Stewart and garden walls, Newtownards	54°33′05″N 5°36′09″W	Country House	Ards	A	A	HB24/04/052 A	Upload another image See more images	
The Manor House, High Street, Donaghadee	54°38′27″N 5°32′08″W	House	Ards	A	B	HB24/07/009 A	Upload Photo	
St. Mark's (Church of Ireland) Parish Church, Church Street, Newtownards	54°35′42″N 5°42′14″W	Church	Ards	A	A	HB24/11/001	Upload another image	
Moyallen Friends Meeting House, 117 Stramore Road, Gilford	54°23′27″N 6°23′08″W	Church	Banbridge	–	A	HB17/01/022	Upload Photo	
Cleland Mausoleum, Dundonald Parish Graveyard, Dundonald	54°35′37″N 5°48′23″W	Memorial	Castlereagh	–	A	HB25/05/002	Upload another image	
Knockbreda Church (Church of Ireland), Church Road, Knockbreda	54°33′42″N 5°54′44″W	Church	Castlereagh	–	A	HB25/16/005 A	Upload another image See more images	
Waringstown House, Magherana, Waringstown	54°25′49″N 6°17′56″W	House	Craigavon	–	A	HB14/06/001	Upload another image See more images	
Killyleagh Castle, Killyleagh	54°24′09″N 5°39′15″W	Country House	Down	–	A	HB18/03/001 A	Upload another image See more images	
The Bawn, Killyleagh Castle	54°24′25″N 5°39′09″W	Walling	Down	–	A	HB18/03/001 B	Upload Photo	
Gatehouse screen at Killyleagh Castle	54°24′25″N 5°39′09″W	Gates/ Screens/ Lodges	Down	–	A	HB18/03/002	Upload Photo	
North east gateway, Killyleagh Castle	54°24′10″N 5°39′15″W	Gates/ Screens/ Lodges	Down	–	A	HB18/03/003	Upload another image	
Rademon Unitarian Meeting House, Listooder Road, Crossgar, Downpatrick	54°24′21″N 5°48′40″W	Church	Down	A	A	HB18/05/022	Upload Photo	
Castle Ward House, Castleward, Strangford, Downpatrick	54°22′03″N 5°34′50″W	Country House	Down	–	A	HB18/08/065	Upload another image See more images	
Southwell Charity School and Almshouses, English Street, Downpatrick	54°19′41″N 5°43′13″W	School	Down	–	A	HB18/20/001	Upload another image See more images	
Downpatrick First (Non-Subscribing) Presbyterian Church, Stream Street, Downpatrick	54°19′30″N 5°42′44″W	Church	Down	A	B+	HB18/19/016	Upload another image See more images	
Holy Trinity Cathedral, English Street, Downpatrick	54°19′37″N 5°43′21″W	Church	Down	–	A	HB18/20/005	Upload another image See more images	
Cathedral of St. Patrick and St. Colman, Hill Street, Newry	54°10′27″N 6°20′19″W	Church	Newry and Mourne	A	A	HB16/28/036	Upload another image See more images	
Parish Church of St. Mary (Church of Ireland), John Mitchel Place, Newry	54°10′20″N 6°20′21″W	Church	Newry and Mourne	A	A	HB16/30/001	Upload another image See more images	
Ross Monument, Warrenpoint Road, Rostrevor	54°05′58″N 6°12′34″W	Memorial	Newry and Mourne	–	A	HB16/06/056	Upload another image	
Narrow Water Castle, Newry Road, Warrenpoint	54°19′30″N 5°42′44″W	Hotel	Newry and Mourne	A	A	HB16/11/019 A	Upload another image See more images	(Note: The 19th-century house, not the 16th-century tower)
Derrymore House, Bessbrook, Newry	54°11′22″N 6°23′03″W	Gallery/ Museum	Newry and Mourne	A	A	HB16/23/010	Upload another image See more images	
Rathmoyle, Craigdarragh Road, Helen's Bay, Bangor		House	North Down	–	A	HB23/16/030	Upload Photo	
Bangor Old Custom House, Quay Street, Bangor	54°39′53″N 5°40′03″W	House	North Down	–	A	HB23/05/012	Upload another image	
Helen's Tower, Conlig	54°37′22″N 5°41′40″W	Tower	North Down	–	A	HB23/06/009	Upload another image See more images	
Town Hall, Bangor Castle, Bangor	54°39′23″N 5°40′10″W	Town Hall	North Down	–	A	HB23/07/001 A	Upload another image	
Local Heritage and Visitor's Centre, Bangor Castle, Bangor	54°39′23″N 5°40′10″W	Gallery/ Museum	North Down	–	A	HB23/07/001 B	Upload Photo	
Bangor Abbey Parish Church, Bangor	54°39′20″N 5°40′30″W	Church	North Down	–	A	HB23/07/004	Upload another image See more images	
3 Station Square, Helen's Bay	54°40′00″N 5°44′27″W	House	North Down	–	A	HB23/15/033	Upload Photo	
Station Building, Helen's Bay Station, Helen's Bay	54°40′00″N 5°44′28″W	Railway Station Structures	North Down	–	A	HB23/15/034	Upload another image See more images	
Station Platforms, Helen's Bay Station	54°39′59″N 5°44′27″W	Railway Station Structures	North Down	–	A	HB23/15/035	Upload another image	
Railway Bridge, Helen's Bay Station	54°40′00″N 5°44′29″W	Bridge	North Down	–	A	HB23/15/036	Upload Photo	
Coach Yard, Helen's Bay Station	54°40′00″N 5°44′28″W	Outbuildings	North Down	–	A	HB23/15/037	Upload Photo	
Parish Church of St. Malachi, Main Street, Hillsborough	54°27′42″N 6°04′51″W	Church	Lisburn	–	A	HB19/05/001	Upload another image See more images	
Gate screen and lodges (aka Sexton's House) at Parish Church Of St. Malachi, Hillsborough	54°27′45″N 6°04′59″W	Gates/ Screens/ Lodges	Lisburn	–	A	HB19/05/002	Upload another image See more images	
Marquis of Downshire Monument, Monument Road, Hillsborough	54°27′25″N 6°05′31″W	Memorial	Lisburn	–	A		Upload another image	
Larchfield House, Upper Ballynahinch Road, Lisburn	54°27′30″N 5°58′47″W	House	Lisburn	–	A	HB19/06/003	Upload another image	
St. John's Parish Church, Moira	54°28′50″N 6°13′13″W	Church	Lisburn	–	A	HB19/22/001	Upload another image	
