= Sir Thomas Lighton, 1st Baronet =

Ulster Scots banker and politician

Sir Thomas Lighton, 1st Baronet (died 27 April 1805) was an Ulster Scots banker and politician.

== Biography ==
Born in Strabane, County Tyrone, Lighton was the son of a tenant-farmer, John Lighton, and Elizabeth Walker. After working as a trader in Strabane, he travelled to India and became a soldier in the East India Company. He was rewarded with a gift of £20,000 by the wife of General Richard Matthews after successfully transporting the General's fortune from India to London. He returned to Ireland and used his money to establish the Lighton, Needham & Shaw Bank in Dublin alongside Robert Shaw. He held the office of High Sheriff of County Dublin in 1790. Between 1790 and 1797 Lighton sat in the Irish House of Commons as the Member of Parliament for Tuam. On 1 March 1791 he was created a baronet, of Merville in the Baronetage of Ireland. He represented Carlingford in the Irish Commons from 1798 to 1800.

Lighton married Anne Pollock, daughter of William Pollock, on 11 December 1777. He was succeeded by his eldest son, Thomas.

Parliament of Ireland
Preceded by Robert Day; Sir Lucius O'Brien, Bt	Member of Parliament for Tuam; 1790–1797; With: Jonah Barrington	Succeeded by John Bingham; Walter Aglionby Yelverton
Preceded by Robert Ross; Robert Johnson	Member of Parliament for Carlingford; 1798–1800; With: Richard Magenis	Succeeded by Constituency disenfranchised
Baronetage of Ireland
New creation	Baronet (of Merville); 1791–1805	Succeeded by Thomas Lighton
