= Walter Aglionby Yelverton =

Anglo-Irish politician (1772-1834)

Walter Aglionby Yelverton (23 January 1772 – 3 June 1834), styled The Honourable from 1795, was an Anglo-Irish politician.

Yelverton was the son of Barry Yelverton, 1st Viscount Avonmore and Mary Nugent. Between 1797 and 1800 he was the Member of Parliament for Tuam in the Irish House of Commons.

He married Cecilia Yelverton, daughter of George Yelverton, on 28 November 1791; together they had four children.

Parliament of Ireland
Preceded by Sir Thomas Lighton, Bt; Jonah Barrington	Tuam; 1797–1800; With: John Bingham (1797–1800); George Vesey (1800)	Succeeded by Constituency disenfranchised
