= Herbert Lightfoot Eason =

British ophthalmologist

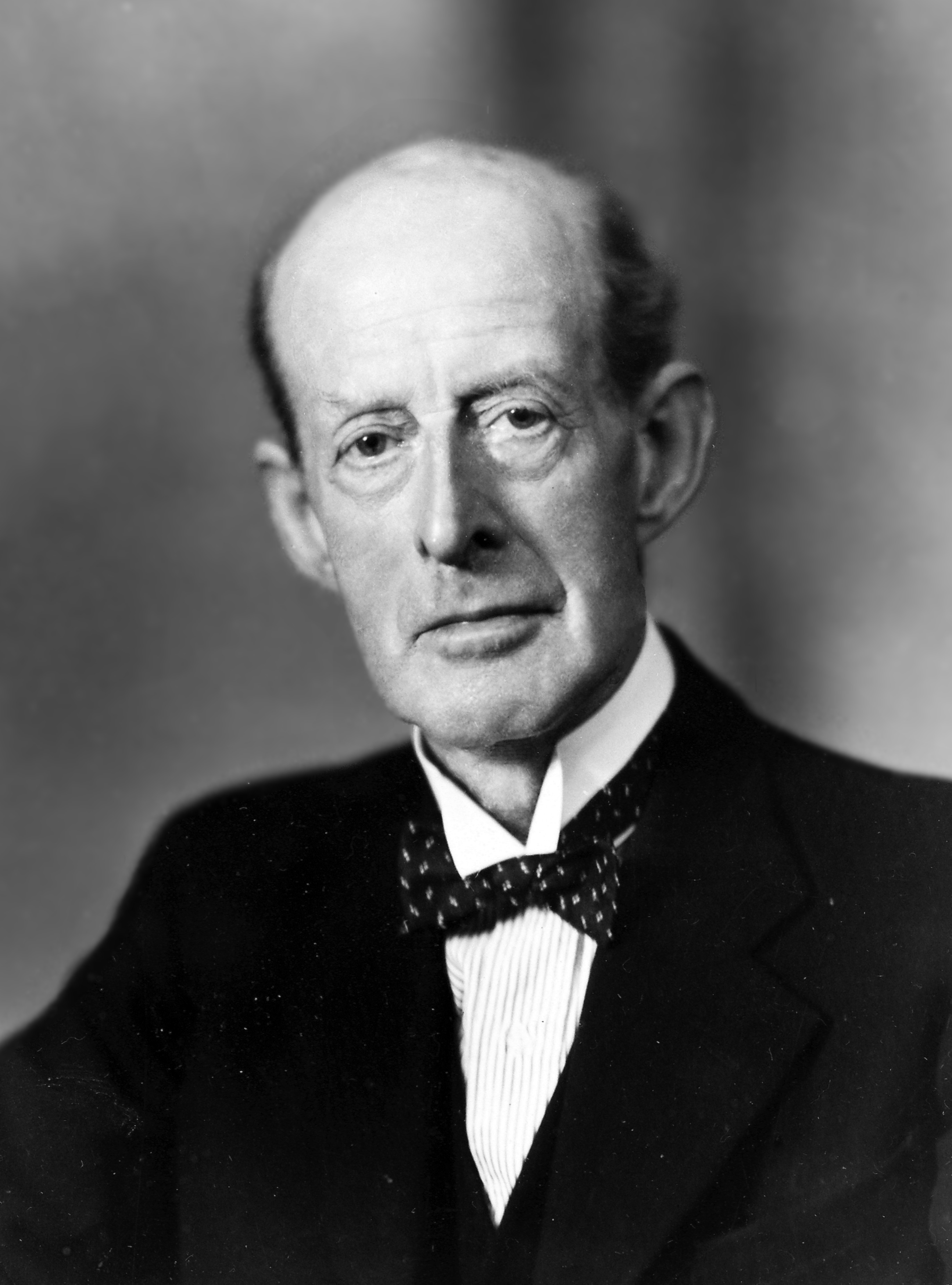
Herbert Lightfoot Eason

Lieutenant Colonel Sir Herbert Lightfoot Eason CB, CMG, MD, MS, FRCS. (15 July 1874 – 2 November 1949)) was an English ophthalmic surgeon who served in the Great War as a Lieutenant Colonel and Consultant Surgeon to the Forces in Egypt and at Gallipoli. He was appointed Superintendent at Guy's Hospital, London, in 1920, Vice Chancellor from 1935 to 1937 (and later Principal) of the University of London. President of the General Medical Council from 1939 and was Knighted in 1943 for his services to medicine.

== Early life ==
He was born on 15 July 1874 in Lewisham, the son of Mary Ann Moore and Edward Henry Physick Eason, an auctioneer and surveyor of Bishopsgate. In the 1881 and 1891 Census the family are living in Clapham.

Herbert was educated at a private school in Dulwich, and then studied medicine and surgery at University College, London and Guy's Hospital, London, qualifying M.R.C.S. and L.R.C.P. in 1898, before proceeding to M.D. in 1901 and M.S. in 1902.

He was house physician at the hospital under Sir James Goodhart, MD, FRCP, although it is said he was more influenced by Sir Cooper Perry, MD, FRCP, Superintendent of Guy's Hospital, towards pursuing his career in administration. On his advice Eason specialised in ophthalmology which would leave him more time for this administrative work.

He was appointed assistant ophthalmic surgeon at Guy's in 1905, and was Warden of the college from 1902 and Dean of the Medical and Dental School from 1903 to 1912, becoming a senior ophthalmic surgeon at the hospital before the Great War.

== War service ==
During the First World War on 13 September 1915 he was commissioned as a Lieutenant Colonel into the Royal Army Medical Corps, and was appointed as Consultant Ophthalmic Surgeon to Forces in the Egypt and Mediterranean Theatres of War from 1915 to 1919.

On 1 December 1916, he was Mentioned in Despatches for his distinguished service by General Sir Archibald Murray, Commander in Chief, Egyptian Forces, in his despatch dated 13 October 1916.

On 1 January 1917, he was created a Companion of the Order of St Michael and St George, for his distinguished services rendered during military operations in the Mediterranean Theatre at Gallipoli.

On 31 January 1918, he was further made a Companion of the Order of the Bath (Military Division), for his valuable services rendered in connection with military operations in Egypt.

On 1 July 1919, Eason relinquished his commission and retained the rank of Lieutenant Colonel.

While serving in Egypt he formed a life-long friendship with General (later Field-Marshal and 1st Viscount) Edmund Allenby, who Eason was to later describe as the greatest man he ever met in his long life of many distinguished contacts.

== Post-War ==
In 1920, he was appointed as Superintendent of Guy's Hospital. He was a member of the Faculty of Medicine at the University of London, and represented the Faculty on the Senate from 1911, and represented the Senate on the Court from 1931 to 1937.

Eason was elected Vice-Chancellor of the University of London in 1935, and was appointed Principal to the university in 1937 after the accidental death of Edwin Deller. He served on the General Medical Council from 1924, and was later joint treasurer with Sir George Newman before he was elected president of the council on 1 December 1939. Eason was also elected as Honorary Master of the Bench of the Inner Temple in 1938.

He is said to have been a forward-thinking reformer in the medical profession, and although he excelled as an administrator it was due to this he published little in his field of Ophthalmology. However, he is noted as a highly skilled surgeon and operator, and as a teacher his lectures were said to be unequalled and were always fully attended in both under and post-graduate studies. He also held numerous other senior administrative and medical appointments throughout the 1930s and 40's, which included sitting on the Medical Consultive Board for the Royal Navy.

In 1935, he was awarded the King George V Jubilee Medal as Consultant Ophthalmic Surgeon, Royal Navy.
In 1937, he was awarded the King George VI Coronation Medal as Vice-Chancellor, University of London.

On 2 June 1943, he was knighted by King George VI for his services to medicine.

== Personal life ==
He married twice, firstly on 22 December 1908 at Bangor Parish Church in Ireland to the Honourable Harriette Ierne Maude Bingham (b.1882), the eldest daughter of John Bingham, 5th Baron Clanmorris. She died 11 January 1917 when Eason was away at war in Egypt, leaving a daughter, Diana Clare Eason, who was born on 11 March 1912 in Hanover Square, London.

He married, second, on 10 April 1920 at Southwark Cathedral, London to Margaret Wallace, the daughter of Robert G Wallace, an Estate Agent of Quidenham, Attleborough, Norfolk and they had two daughters.

Throughout the 1920s and 30s they lived at Guy's Hospital in the Superintendent's eighteenth-century house, although after its destruction by German Luftwaffe bombing in 1941, the family moved to their home at Newbridge Mill, Coleman's Hatch in Sussex.

Lieutenant Colonel Sir Herbert Lightfoot Eason died on 2 November 1949 at Nuffield House, Guy's Hospital. A memorial service to him was held in Guy's Hospital chapel on 11 November 1949, which was announced in the (London) Times. He also had a four-page obituary published in the British Medical Journal in January 1950, as well as his obituary appearing in numerous other medical publications in the UK and also widely in the USA.

== See also ==
- List of vice-chancellors of the University of London
- List of British university chancellors and vice-chancellors

Academic offices
Preceded by Louis Napoleon George Filon	Vice-Chancellor of the University of London; 1935–1937	Succeeded by Sir Robert Howson Pickard
