= John Bingham, 5th Baron Clanmorris =

Irish peer

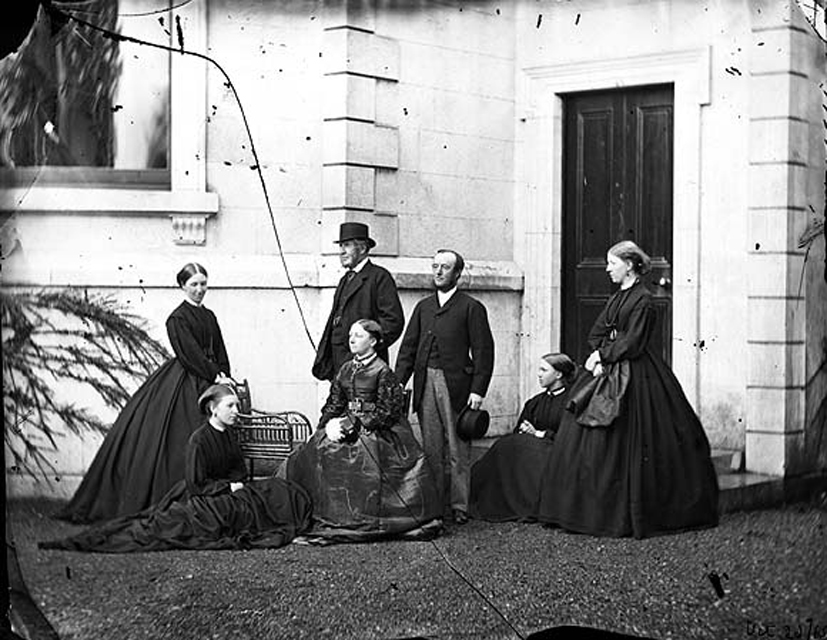
Lord and Lady Clanmorris photographed with Lord Clonbrock and family

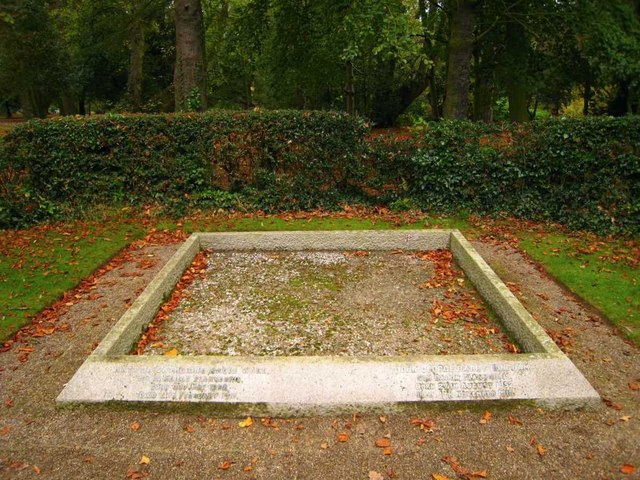
Grave of Lord and Lady Clanmorris, Castle Park, Bangor

John George Barry Bingham, 5th Baron Clanmorris DL, JP (27 August 1852 – 4 November 1916), was an Irish peer.

== Early life ==
Bingham was the son of John Bingham, 4th Baron Clanmorris, by Sarah Selina, daughter of Burton Persse. His mother and grandmother were members of the Persse family, making him a cousin of Augusta, Lady Gregory. He was educated at Eton.

== Career ==
In 1876, aged 23, he succeeded his father in the barony. This was an Irish peerage and did not entitle him to a seat in the House of Lords. Lord Clanmorris was an aide-de-camp to the Lord-Lieutenant of Ireland between 1876 and 1878 and served as a Deputy Lieutenant of County Mayo and as a Justice of the Peace for County Down and County Galway.

Lord Clanmorris lived mainly at Cregclare, Ardrahan, County Galway, though with addresses in Dublin, London and County Mayo. His Galway seats were Cregclare and Seamount. He owned over three thousand acres (12 km^{2}) in Galway alone, and had paid nineteen thousand for a section of the Lambert family property. At the age of twenty-six he was registered a member of eight clubs across the United Kingdom, including gentleman's and yacht clubs.

== Personal life ==
He had married Matilda Catherine Maude, daughter of Robert Edward Ward of Bangor Castle, County Down, in 1878 and had seven sons and three daughters, including:

- Hon. Harriette Ierne Maude Bingham (1882–1917), who married Sir Herbert Lightfoot Eason in 1908, parents of Diana Clare Eason.
- Hon. Edward Bingham was a Rear-Admiral in the Royal Navy.
- Hon. Emily Ina Florence Bingham, who married Herbert Dixon 1st Baron of Glentoran.

Lord Clanmorris died at Bangor Castle, County Down, in November 1916, aged 64. Lord Clanmorris was succeeded by his eldest son, Arthur. Lady Clanmorris died at Bangor Castle in February 1941, aged 82.

== See also ==
- Earl of Lucan

Peerage of Ireland
Preceded by John Charles Robert Bingham	Baron Clanmorris; 1876–1916	Succeeded by Arthur Maurice Robert Bingham
