= Irk Valley Junction rail crash =

Railway crash in Collyhurst, United Kingdom

Details
- Date: 15 August 1953; 07:40
- Location: Irk Valley Junction, Collyhurst near Manchester Victoria station
- Coordinates: 53°29′54″N 2°13′34″W
- Country: England
- Line: Manchester to Bury line
- Cause: Signal passed at danger

Statistics
- Trains: 2
- Passengers: 106
- Deaths: 10
- Injured: 58 (22 seriously)

The Irk Valley Junction rail crash occurred on 15 August 1953 at Collyhurst, just over one mile (1.6 km) from Manchester Victoria station. At that point, the electrified line to Bury passes through Irk Valley Junction, so called because it lies on a viaduct above the River Irk. At 07:40 on the morning of 15 August 1953, the 07:20 electric train from Bury collided with the 07:36 steam passenger train to Bacup hauled by a Class 4P 2-6-4 tank engine. The leading electric coach struck and overturned the steam engine and smashed through the parapet wall. The front of the carriage fell 40 feet (12 m) onto the bank of the river; the rear fell 70 feet (21 m) into the shallow river itself. Nine passengers and the driver of the electric train were killed. The crash occurred on a Saturday; had it been a weekday, the casualties would likely have been far higher.

The investigation revealed that the causes of the accident were twofold. Firstly the electric train passed the home signal at Irk Valley Junction at danger. Analysing the previous 110 runnings of the 07:20 train showed that the distant signal and preceding (Queens Road) home signal were at caution on 101 occasions, but on all these occasions, the Junction home signal had not once been at danger. On this occasion, the Queens Road home signal was clear, and the driver appeared to have therefore missed the Junction home signal as it was always clear in the past, and ignored the distant signal as it was normally at caution anyway and was often cleared by the time he reached it. This had to be assumed to be a lapse in concentration, as visibility was good. The driver did not realise the collision was imminent until a few seconds before it happened, as the train was travelling at 30 miles per hour (48 km/h) and no brake application was made. The steam engine driver was not at fault; the signal was clear for him and he could not see the electric train because of the engine boiler.

The signalman was also at fault for not checking that the electric train had stopped before allowing the steam train through. The absolute block system was in place, but was not being operated in accordance with the regulations. An analysis of the records revealed that the signal boxes in this area had frequently operated outside the guidelines, although until the fateful morning without serious consequence. The Inspecting Officer commented on the indiscipline and gaps in experience of 3 signalmen and also lax supervision, and the potential risk resulting, and that it was unlikely to be confined to this particular locality. Immediately after this accident the Railway Executive Headquarters inaugurated a general campaign against irregular working in signal boxes.

== Sources ==
- Ministry of Transport official accident report
