= Barry Yelverton, 5th Viscount Avonmore =

Anglo-Irish peer (1859–1885)

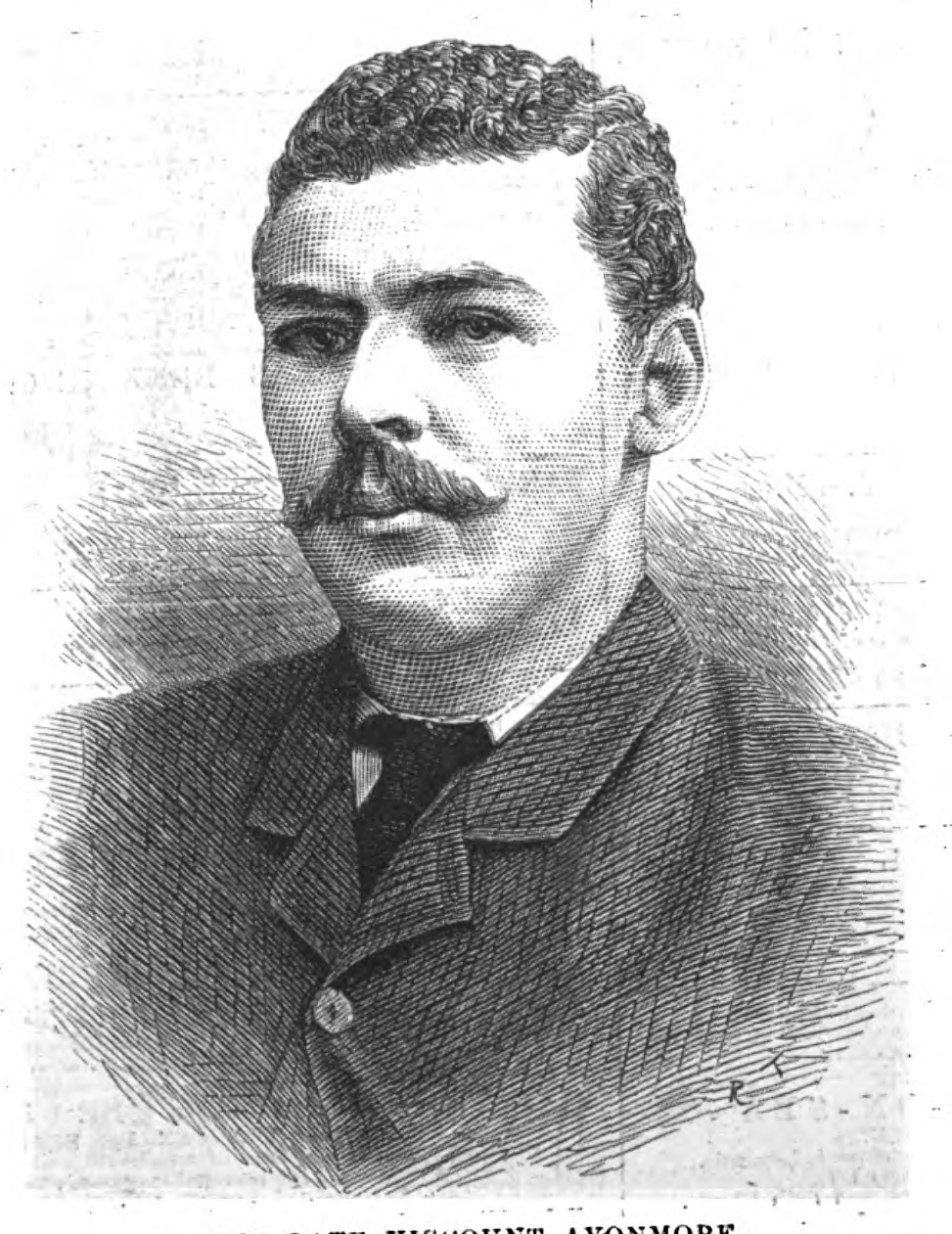
- Born: 11 February 1859; Edinburgh
- Died: 13 February 1885 (aged 26); Battle of Kirbekan
- Parent(s): William Yelverton, 4th Viscount Avonmore; Emily Marianne Ashworth
- Academic career

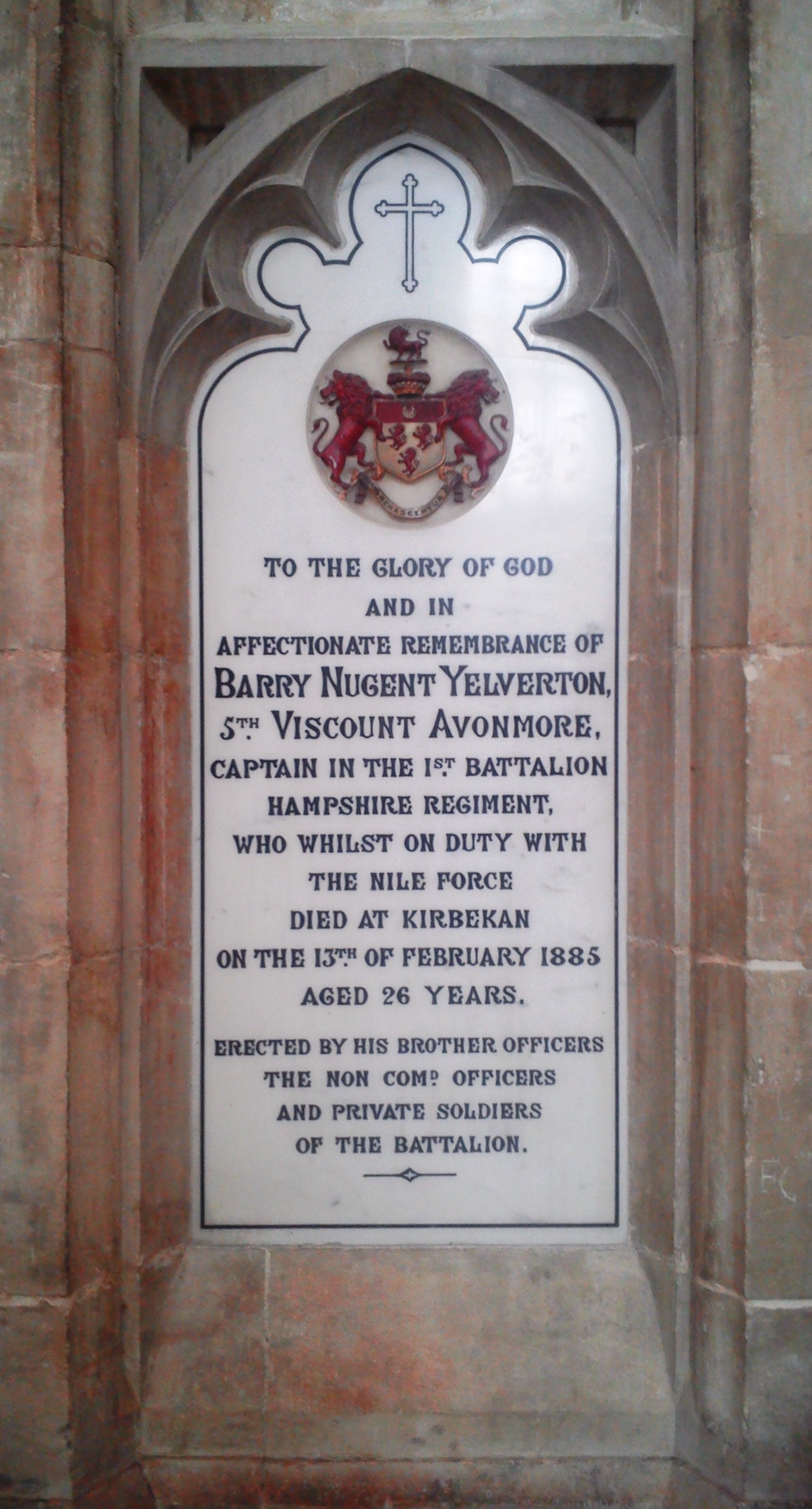
Winchester Cathedral, memorial for the 5th Viscount Avonmore

Captain Barry Nugent Yelverton, 5th Viscount Avonmore (11 February 1859 – 13 February 1885), was an Anglo-Irish peer and an officer in the 37th Foot, which was renamed as the Hampshire Regiment in 1881.

== Life ==
Yelverton was born at Edinburgh, the son of William Yelverton (later Lord Avonmore) by his marriage to Emily Marianne Ashworth, the daughter of Major-General Sir Charles Ashworth, who had previously been married to Edward Forbes, a botanist, by whom she had several children. This marriage was not welcome to Yelverton's family.

He was educated at the Royal Military College, Sandhurst, in Berkshire, and on 30 January 1878 was commissioned into the 37th Foot as a second lieutenant. In February 1879 he was promoted to lieutenant.

He became a British Army instructor in musketry and died of enteric fever at Kirbekan in 1885, while serving in the Sudan. A plaque commemorating him can be found in Winchester Cathedral.

== Notes ==
Peerage of Ireland
Preceded by William Yelverton	Viscount Avonmore; 1883–1885	Succeeded by Algernon Yelverton
