= Robert Howson Pickard =

Sir Robert Howson Pickard FRS (27 September 1874 – 18 October 1949) was a chemist who did pioneering work in stereochemistry and also for the cotton industry in Lancashire. He was also involved in educational administration and was Vice Chancellor of the University of London from 1937-1939. He was Principal of Battersea Polytechnic (which later became the University of Surrey) from 1920 to 1927.

== Early life ==
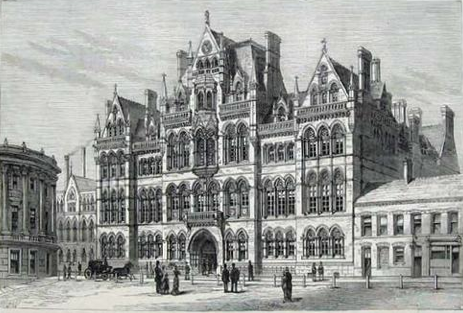
Mason Science College, now the University of Birmingham

He was born in Balsall Heath, Birmingham, Warwickshire, (now the West Midlands), England, the son of Joseph Henry Pickard, a toolmaker, and Alice his wife, the daughter of Robert Howson of Birmingham. From 1883 to 1891, he attended King Edward VI's Grammar School. In 1891, he studied chemistry at Mason Science College (which later became the University of Birmingham), under Percy F. Frankland and obtained a first class B.Sc., then awarded by the University of London. In 1896, he attended the Ludwig-Maximilians-Universität München as an 1851 Exhibitioner being awarded a PhD summa cum laude in 1898.

== Career ==
After a year in Birmingham doing chemical research, he was appointed head of the chemistry at Blackburn Technical School in Blackburn, Lancashire and was principal from 1908-1920. While at Blackburn was involved in publication of 35 papers in the Journal of the Chemical Society. He did original work on chemical structure and optical isomerism and as a result became a Fellow of the Royal Society (FRS) in 1917. Pickard was Principal of Battersea Polytechnic (which later became the University of Surrey) from 1920 to 1927.

He was also consulted by the cotton industry and later became director of the British Cotton Industry Research Association (then the Shirley Institute) in Manchester from 1927 to 1943, and expanded the technical facilities extensively in 1936.

He had considerable organisational skills and was active in several scientific organisations including the Royal Society (council); Society of Chemical Industry (president 1932-33); the Royal Institute of Chemistry (now the Royal Society of Chemistry) (president 1936-1939); the Chemical Society (vice-president); the now defunct Chemical Council (chairman) and various positions over a long period with the University of London including Vice-Chancellor, 1937-1939.

== Personal life ==
He married Ethel Marian Wood in 1901. She died in 1944. They had a daughter, who predeceased her father, and a son. He died at his son's home in Headley, Surrey.

== See also ==
- List of Vice-Chancellors of the University of London
- List of British university chancellors and vice-chancellors

Academic offices
Preceded by Sir Herbert Lightfoot Eason CMG CB	Vice-Chancellor of the University of London; 1937-1939	Succeeded by Professor Frank Horton FRS
