= Collyhurst =

Inner city area of Manchester, England

Coordinates: 53.496703°N 2.217846°W

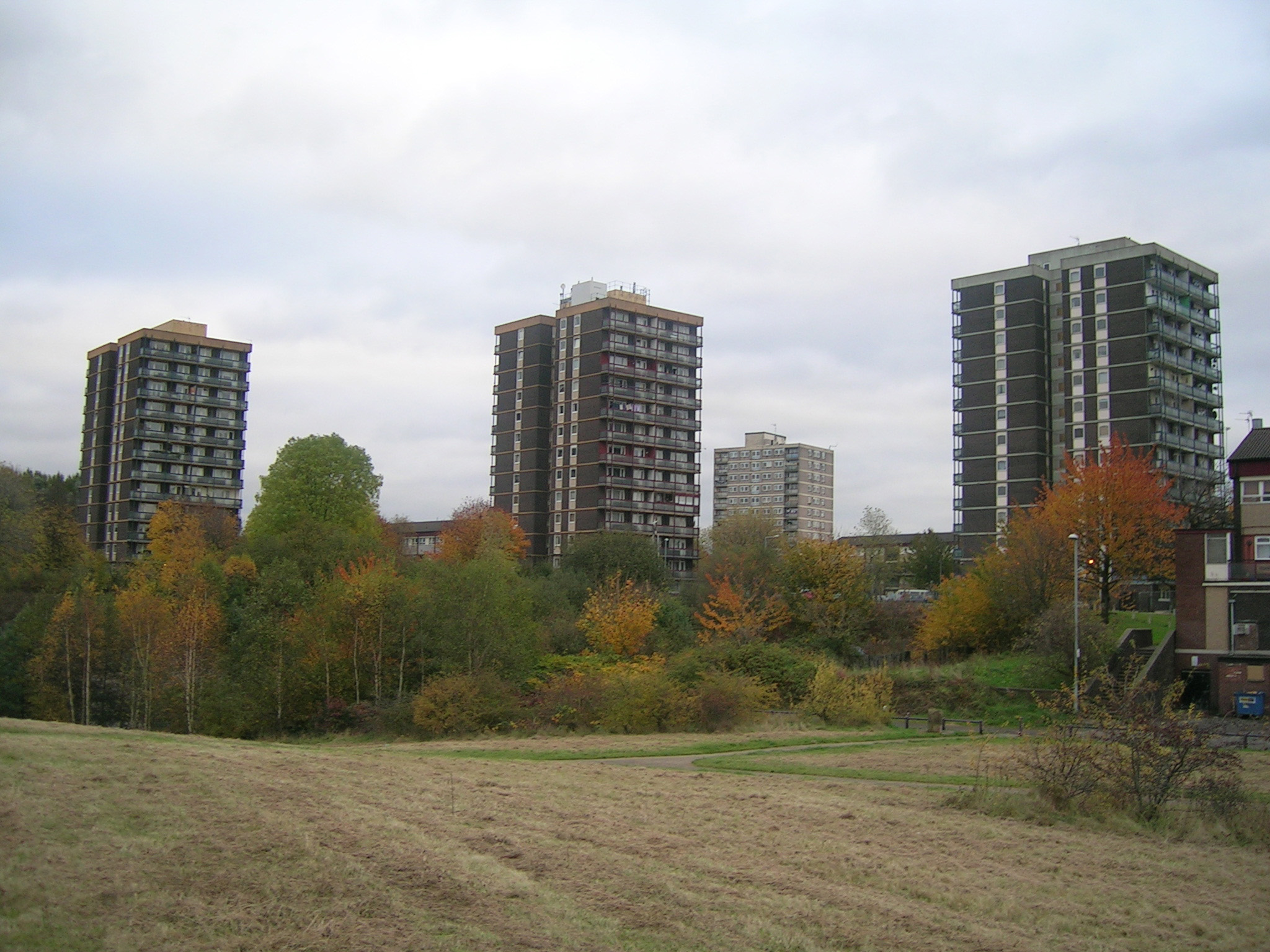

- Location within Greater Manchester
- OS grid reference: SD855000
- Metropolitan borough: Manchester
- Metropolitan county: Greater Manchester
- Region: North West
- Country: England
- Sovereign state: United Kingdom
- Post town: MANCHESTER
- Postcode district: M40
- Dialling code: 0161
- Police: Greater Manchester
- Fire: Greater Manchester
- Ambulance: North West
- UK Parliament: Blackley and Middleton South; Manchester Central

Collyhurst is an inner city area of Manchester, England, 1.5 miles (2.4 km) northeast of the city centre on Rochdale Road (A664) and Oldham Road (A62), bounded by Smedley, Harpurhey and Monsall to the north, Miles Platting to the east, Ancoats to the south, and the River Irk to the west. Prominent buildings include two Roman Catholic churches, St Patrick's and St Malachy's.

== History ==
In 2020s, Collyhurst will be regenerated as part of the Victoria North "new town" development.

== Collyhurst sandstone ==
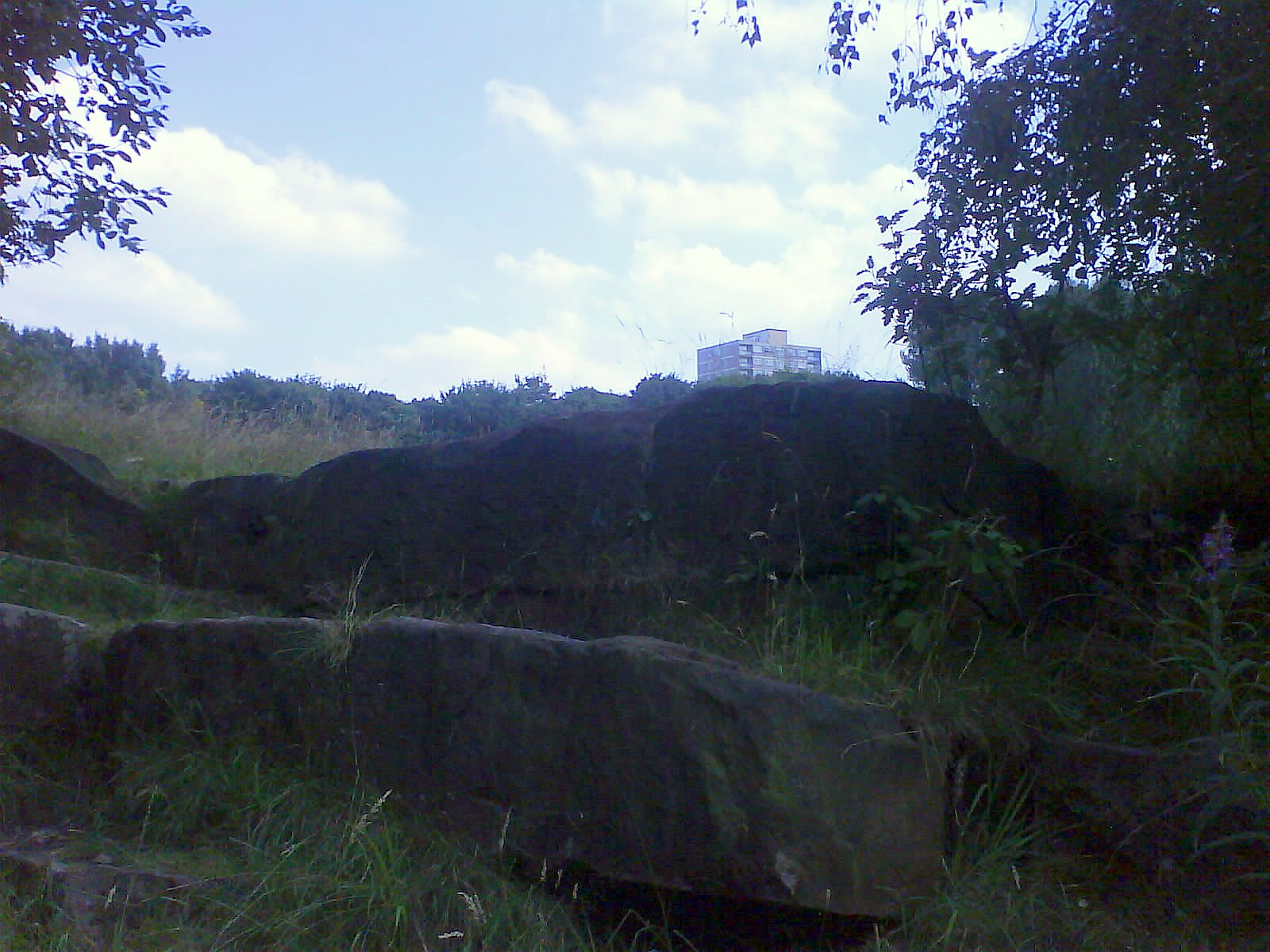
Sandstone at Collyhurst Quarry

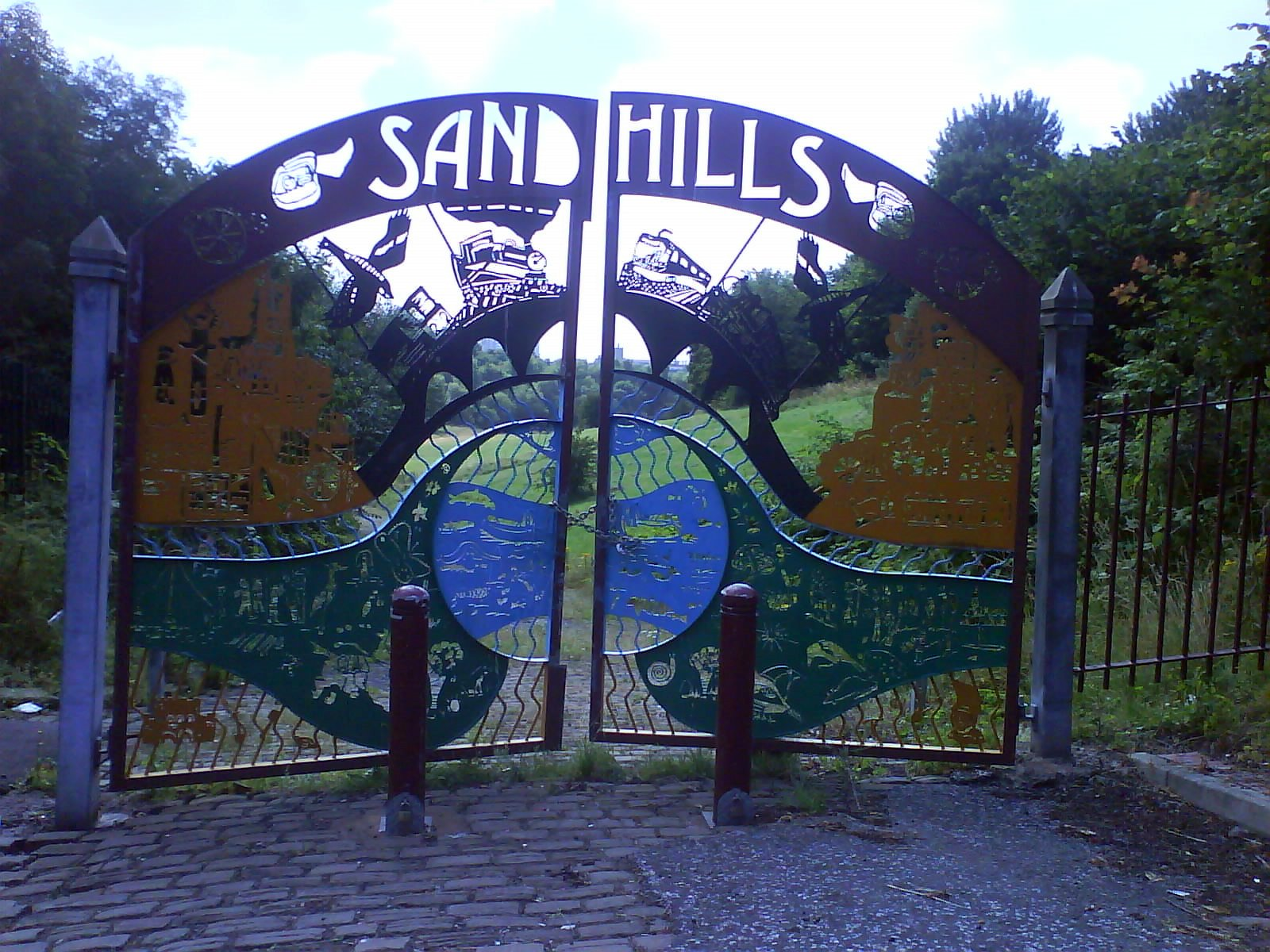
Entrance to Sandhills

Much of the red sandstone used for building in Manchester and the surrounding area, including stone for the Roman fort at Castlefield, St Ann's Church in the city centre, Manchester Cathedral and the original buildings of Chetham's Hospital, came from Collyhurst Quarry. Geologists use the term Collyhurst Sandstone for this type of soft red sandstone, which occurs in North West England. It is a fine to medium grained sedimentary rock, created from desert sands blown into dune formations during the Early Permian period when the area which now constitutes the British Isles was within the desert belts to the north of the equator. The rock is not very resistant to weathering and erosion and disintegrates relatively quickly. The quarry was mentioned by John Leland in the description of Manchester in his book. The Itinerary of John Leland in or about the years 1535 to 1543, saying that there was " a goodly quarre hard by the towne". Stone was transported the short distance into Manchester by river on barges or rafts. The quarry is disused and the area around it has been turned into a park called "Sandhills" as part of Manchester City Council's Irk Valley Project.

== Churches ==
There are now two Roman Catholic churches in Collyhurst, St Patrick's and St Malachy's. There was once also St Edmund's in Monsall Street (architect P.P. Pugin, 1894). The three former Anglican churches have been demolished since they were described by Nikolaus Pevsner in The Buildings of England; Lancashire; I, 1969. The oldest was St Oswald's on Rochdale Road in the Gothic of the 13th century, the architect was E.H. Shellard; the east end was spectacularly picturesque and there was a steeple designed by John Lowe. Lowe was also the architect of the two other churches, the Albert Memorial Church in Queen's Road, 1864, a red brick building with a northwest tower topped by a spire; and St James's in Teignmouth Street, 1874 (this had a steeple at the northwest corner, a porch on the southwest, and a polygonal apse). The Union Chapel, Queen's Park, was designed by R. Moffat Smith and has a low turreted tower.

In 1972, all the Church of England churches in Collyhurst and Monsall were amalgamated into a new benefice of the Church of the Saviour. The church was established on part of the site formerly occupied by St Oswald's Church on Rochdale Road. This is an evangelical Church of England church.

== War memorial ==
There is a war memorial on Rochdale Road next to the former site of the Collyhurst Flats, erected by public subscription and unveiled by the Edward Stanley, 17th Earl of Derby (Secretary of State for War) on 23 May 1923 to commemorate British servicemen who died during the First World War.

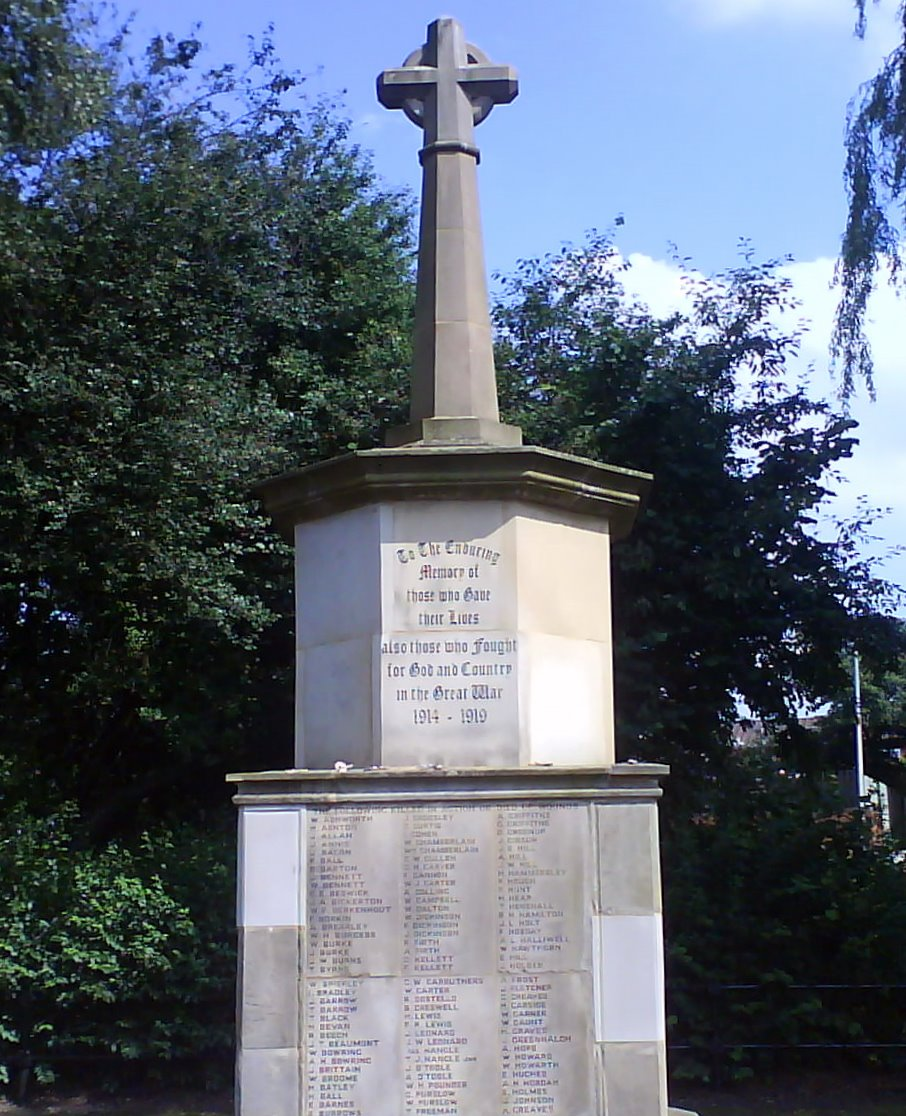
Collyhurst War Memorial

== Collyhurst Hall ==
Collyhurst Hall was once home to the Mosley family, lords of the manor of Manchester until 1846. There had been a hall on the site since at least 1649, but Collyhurst Hall had been demolished by the end of the 19th century to make way for a development of terraced houses, themselves demolished in the 1960s. What remains of the hall is buried beneath a playing field on the corner of Rochdale Road and Collyhurst Street.

Archaeologists from the University of Salford and Manchester Communication Academy, together with volunteers, local residents and school children, undertook an excavation of the site in 2016. The project was supported by Collyhurst Big Local, Manchester City Council, Tameside Archaeology Society and Manchester Museum.

== Sport ==
Collyhurst Youth JFC was established in 2018 by a group of local people to bring football back to the area. They currently have around 80 children on their books and are based at Manchester Communication Academy School. Their badge is based on the old monument on Rochdale Road and the new Sandhills Gate.

== Popular music ==
For a brief period in the mid-1970s, The Electric Circus, a run-down venue on Collyhurst Street, formerly the Palladium variety club, found itself at the centre of Manchester's punk rock scene. It played host to bands such as the Sex Pistols, The Jam, Joy Division, then known as Warsaw, Buzzcocks, Slaughter and the Dogs and The Clash's "White Riot" tour before its closure in 1977. It has since been demolished. Lesser unknown bands have also come from the backstreets of Collyhurst notably; The Young Offenders Institute, Hoffa, Overcast, Morning Afterglow, M-40 and Ablekaned.

== Transport ==
Collyhurst is served by buses on the Rochdale Road corridor.

Transport for Greater Manchester have proposed a new tram stop at Sandhills which would serve Collyhurst.

On 15 August 1953, the front coach of a Manchester to Bury electric train fell from the Collyhurst viaduct over the River Irk after colliding with a local steam train. Ten people were killed and 58 injured in what became known as the Irk Valley Junction rail crash.

== Notable people ==
- Jim Allen (1926–1999), playwright
- Colin Barlow (1935–2018), Manchester City footballer
- Pat Barrett, light welterweight boxer
- Stan Bowles, England and QPR footballer
- Jackie Brown (1909–1971), former world champion flyweight boxer
- Les Dawson (1931–1993), comedian
- Michael Gomez, Irish-born super featherweight boxer
- Bruce Jones, former Coronation Street actor
- Henry Kelly (1887–1960), recipient of the Victoria Cross
- Brian Kidd, England, Manchester United, Arsenal and Manchester City footballer
- Nico O'Reilly, England and Manchester City footballer
- Carlo Sartori, Manchester United footballer
- Jack Smethurst (1932–2022), actor
- Nobby Stiles (1942–2020), Manchester United and World Cup winning footballer
- Bob Litherland (1930–2011), MP for Central Manchester 1979-1997
