= Henry Kelly (VC) =

English Victoria Cross recipient (1887-1960)

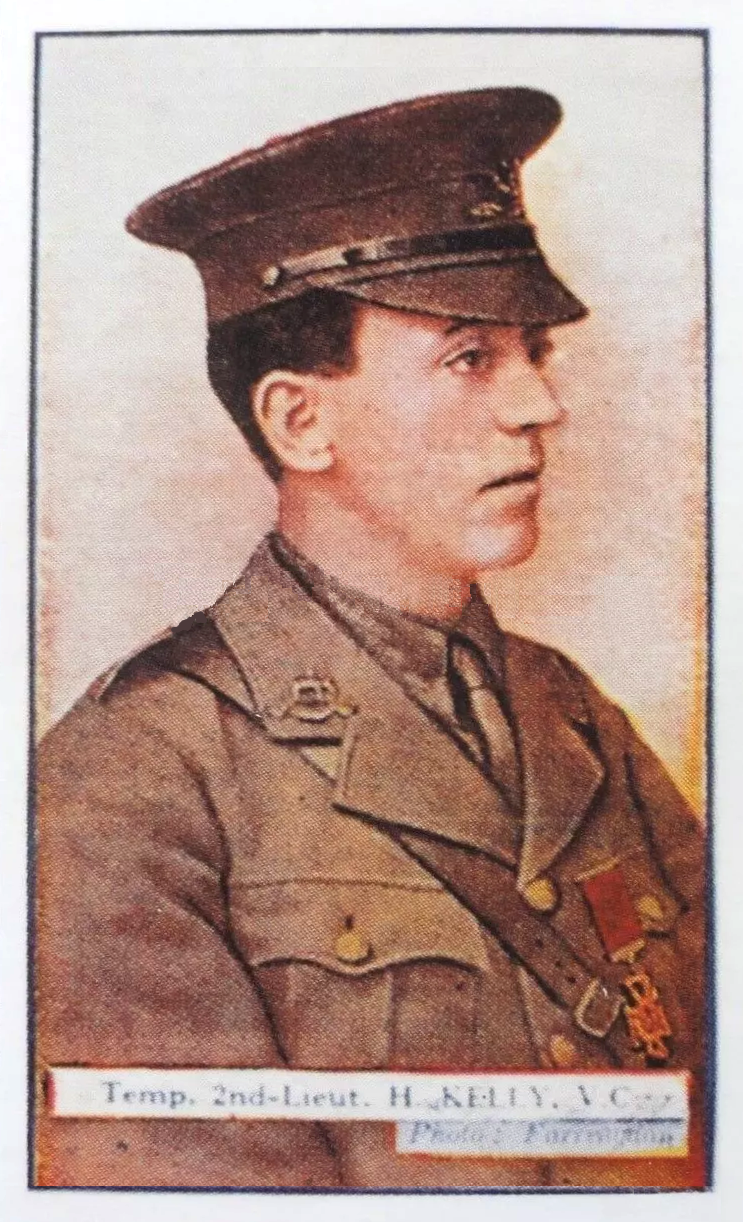
- Kelly depicted on a cigarette card
- Born: 10 July 1887; Collyhurst, Lancashire, England
- Died: 18 January 1960 (aged 72); Prestwich, Lancashire, England
- Military career
- Allegiance: United Kingdom
- Branch: British Army; Irish National Army; Spanish Republican Army
- Service years: 1914–1920,1922–1923,1936, 1939–1944
- Rank: Major
- Units: Manchester Regiment; The Duke of Wellington's (West Riding) Regiment; Pioneer Corps; Cheshire Regiment
- Conflicts: World War I; Irish Civil War; Spanish Civil War; World War II
- Awards: Victoria Cross; Military Cross and Bar; Médaille Militaire (France); Croix de Guerre (Belgium); Grand Laurelled Cross of San Fernando (Spain)

Major Henry Kelly VC, MC & bar (10 July 1887 – 18 July 1960) was an English recipient of the Victoria Cross, the highest and most prestigious award for gallantry in the face of the enemy that can be awarded to British and Commonwealth forces.

Kelly was born on 10 July 1887 in Collyhurst, Manchester. He was a temporary second lieutenant in the 10th Battalion, The Duke of Wellington's (West Riding) Regiment during the First World War at the time of his award of the Victoria Cross in 1916. He was awarded a Military Cross and later a bar to that medal in Italy in 1918. Other military awards include the Belgian Croix de Guerre, the French Médaille Militaire and the Spanish Grand Laurelled Cross of San Fernando.

== Early life ==
Henry Kelly was born to Charles Kelly of Dublin and Jane (née McGarry) of Manchester. He was left the oldest of 10 children after his father died in 1904. He was educated at St Patrick's School and Xaverian College, both in Manchester. After moving to King Street in Moston, he was employed as a sorting clerk at the Newton Street sorting office and trained with the 'Manchester Royal Engineers territorial Regiment'. On 5 September 1914, aged 27, he enlisted into the Queen's Own Cameron Highlanders as a private. He transferred to the Manchester Regiment and became a lance corporal and two weeks later a sergeant major. He was commissioned as a second lieutenant on 12 May 1915 into the Duke of Wellington's Regiment (West Riding Regiment), and was posted to France the same month. On 29 October 1916 he was awarded the Victoria Cross, and, after being presented with his VC ribbon by the corps commander on 11 September, he was made a temporary lieutenant.

=== Award of Victoria Cross ===
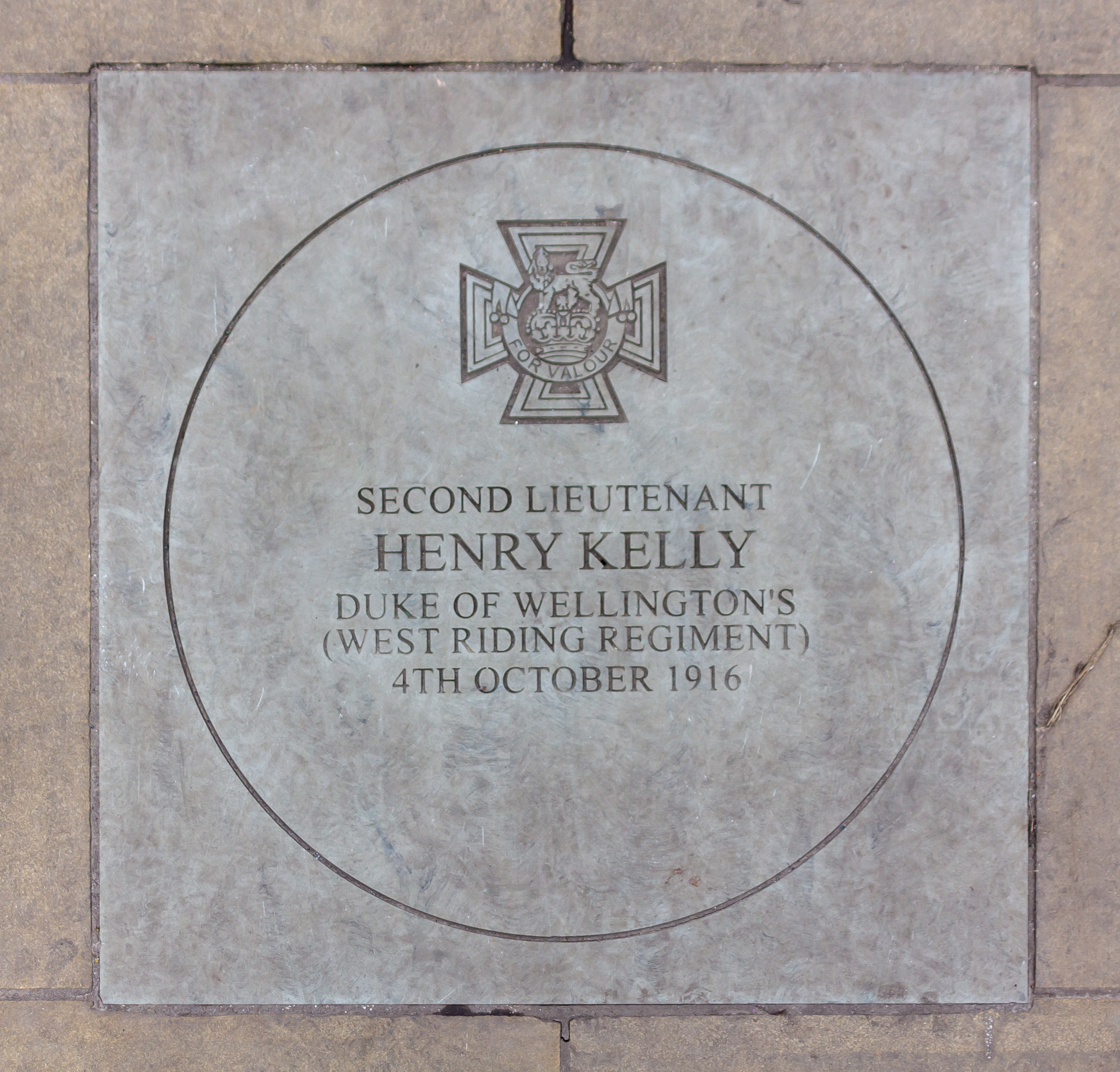
Plaque at the Manchester Cenotaph

On 4 October 1916, when Kelly was 29 years old, he performed an act of bravery at Le Sars, France, for which he was awarded the Victoria Cross.

For most conspicuous bravery in an attack. He twice rallied his company under the heaviest fire, and finally led the only three available men into the enemy trench, and there remained bombing until two of them had become casualties and enemy reinforcements had arrived. He then carried his Company Sergeant Major, who had been wounded, back to our trenches, a distance of 70 yards, and subsequently three other soldiers. He set a fine example of gallantry and endurance.

Later he was also awarded the Belgian Croix de Guerre and the French Médaille Militaire.

=== Award of Military Cross ===
Kelly was made a temporary captain in September 1917 and in 1918 moved with the 10th Battalion to Italy. In June 1918, Kelly saw action in Italy on the Asiago Plateau, where he led a successful raid on Ave, to the south of Asiago, on the night of 21–22 June, after which he was awarded the Military Cross:

For conspicuous gallantry and devotion to duty at Ave, on the night of the 21/22nd June, 1918, when in charge of a company and a half in a raid. Despite a bright moon, he successfully assembled his party and attacked, killing a large number of the enemy and capturing thirty-one prisoners and two machine-guns. His gallantry and fine leadership were largely responsible for the success of the raid.

=== Award of Bar to Military Cross ===
Kelly was involved in later actions on Il Montello above the River Piave. On 27 October 1918 during the Battle of the Piave River he led a successful attack across the Piave, after which he was awarded a bar to his Military Cross:

On the 27th October, 1918, in the attack in the enemy positions across the Piave, he led his company with greatest dash and gallantry to the capture of all its objectives. His coolness and utter disregard of danger under heavy fire of all description inspired all ranks, and by his skilful leadership his company succeeded in taking many machine-guns and several hundred prisoners.

Kelly left the army in 1920, having been promoted to the rank of temporary major.

== Between the wars ==
Kelly spent 1922–1923 in the Irish National Army during the Irish Civil War, then later joined the International Brigades, in 1936, as a foreign volunteer fighting against Fascists in the Spanish Civil War and was ranked Comandante General. Here he was awarded the Grand Laurelled Cross of San Fernando.

After the outbreak of the Second World War in 1939, aged 52, he rejoined the British army and served as a lieutenant in the Pioneer Corps from December 1940, transferring to the Cheshire Regiment in October 1941. From October 1943 until February 1944, he was in charge of the District Claims office of London District, at Curzon Street. He was at that time court martialled and severely reprimanded for making an allegedly false claim for £2 10s. In November 1944 he resigned his commission and left the army to return to work for the Post Office.

== Post 1945 ==
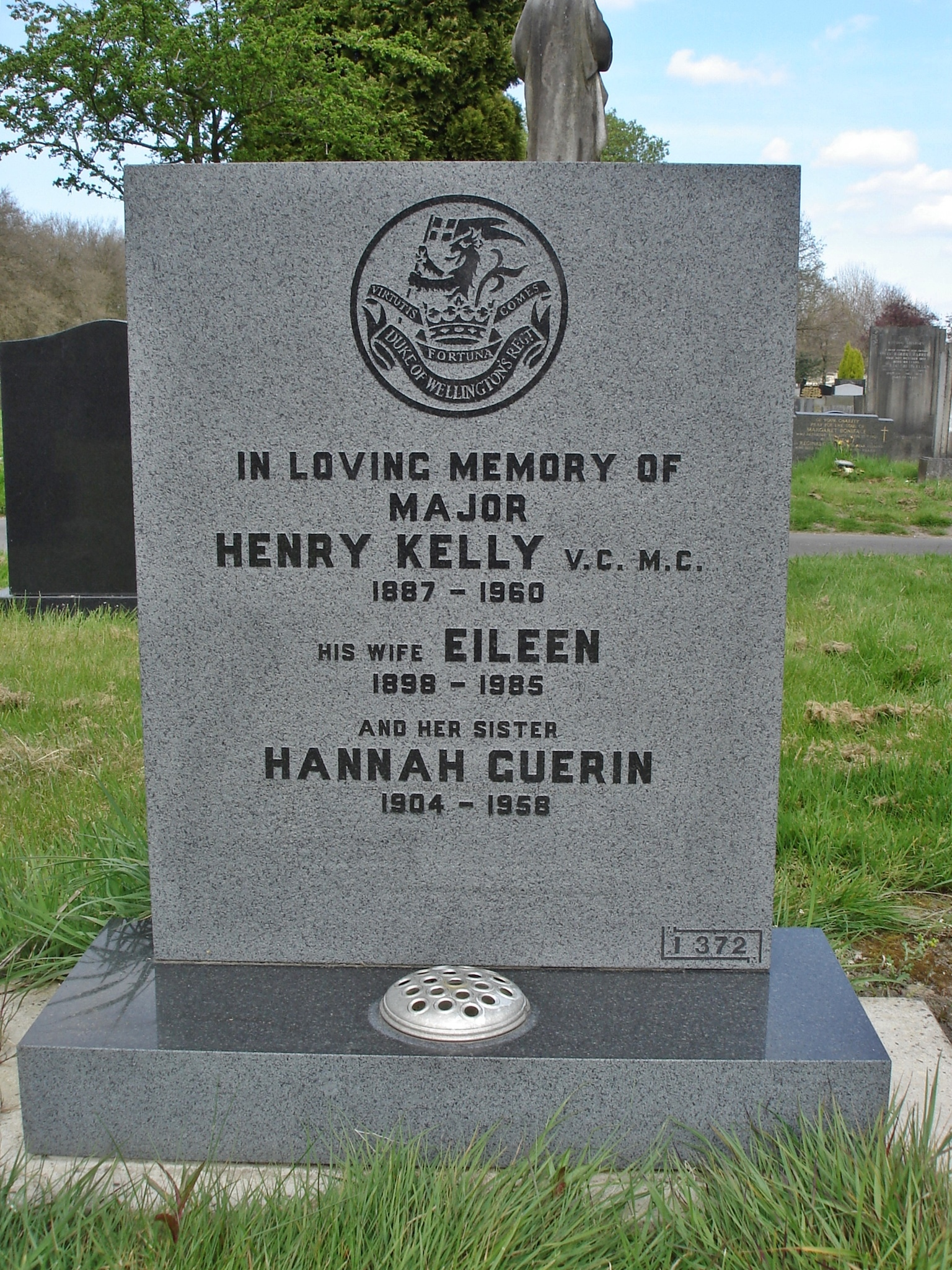
Grave of Kelly, Southern Cemetery, Manchester

Kelly continued to work for the Post Office and lived in Wythenshawe, Manchester. Following a long illness Kelly died, on 18 January 1960, in Prestwich Hospital. He was buried in Southern Cemetery, Manchester.

== Medal location ==
Kelly's Victoria Cross is displayed in The Duke of Wellington's Regimental Museum, located within the Bankfield Museum, Halifax, West Yorkshire, England.
