= Yelverton case =

The Yelverton case was a famous 19th-century Irish law case, which eventually resulted in a change to the law on mixed religion marriages in Ireland.

Under a statute of King George II (19 Geo. 2. c. 13), any marriage between a Catholic (Popish) and a Protestant or a marriage between two Protestants celebrated by a Catholic priest was null and void.

== Premise ==
Theresa Longworth, an English Catholic, and Major The Hon. William Charles Yelverton (who later became, in 1870, The 4th Viscount Avonmore), an Irish Protestant, met in 1852. They became involved, but Charles insisted that he could not marry Theresa publicly because he had promised his family he would not marry and thus, their relationship had to be kept secret. Their relationship continued, with Charles refusing a public ceremony and Theresa refusing to co-habit with Charles without a Catholic marriage ceremony. In 1857 they were "married" by a Catholic priest, in a ceremony which consisted of a renewal of their marital consent previously declared privately to each other. Charles continued to insist that the "marriage" be kept secret.

In 1858, after a miscarriage was suffered by Theresa, Charles met another woman, Emily Forbes, who he intended to marry. He demanded that Theresa renounce her status as his wife and offered her money to relocate to New Zealand. Charles married Emily (née Ashworth) despite Theresa's refusal to renounce her status as his wife. Theresa then instituted an action to receive a wife's maintenance, which Charles resisted, filing his own claim to have him declared free of any marriage with her.

== Case ==
The initial case was heard in The Four Courts in Dublin. The jury's verdict went in favour of the validity of the marriage. Maurice Healy wrote that the cross-examination of Yelverton by Theresa's counsel Sir Edward Sullivan, was perhaps the finest in Irish legal history.

After numerous appeals, ultimately to the House of Lords, the Lords ruled in Charles' favour and his first (Catholic) marriage was declared invalid. His marriage to Emily Forbes was declared lawful.

The case and its perceived unfair consequences, led to the enactment of the Matrimonial Causes and Marriage Law (Ireland) Amendment Act 1870, under which a mixed marriage before a Catholic priest became valid and lawful, subject to the normal provisos of civil law.
