= Algernon Yelverton, 6th Viscount Avonmore =

Irish nobleman

Algernon William Yelverton, 6th Viscount Avonmore (19 November 1866 – 3 September 1910), an Irish nobleman, was the son of Major William Yelverton, 4th Viscount Avonmore, and Emily Marianne Ashworth.

He was a captain of the militia of the Dublin City Artillery branch of the Royal Garrison Artillery from November 1901, and resigned this commission in January 1903.

Lord Avonmore married Mabel Sarah Evans, daughter of George Evans and Jane Fitzgerald, on 17 December 1890 in St. Anne's, Dungannon, County Tyrone, Ireland, and had issue, an only daughter, Evelyn Marianne Mabel Yelverton (1 December 1893 – 16 January 1956). After his death, the viscountcy has been dormant.

Peerage of Ireland
Preceded by Barry Yelverton	Viscount Avonmore; 1885–1910	Dormant
