= John Bingham, 1st Baron Clanmorris =

Irish peer

John Bingham, 1st Baron Clanmorris (1762 – May 1821) was an Irish peer.

Bingham was the son of Henry Bingham and his wife Letitia (née Daly). He was elected to the Irish House of Commons for Tuam in 1798, a seat he held until 1800. He then exchanged the two seats he controlled in this borough with the government in return for £8,000 and a peerage. Consequently, in July 1800 Bingham was elevated to the Peerage of Ireland as Baron Clanmorris, of Newbrook in the County of Mayo.

Bingham married the Hon. Anna Maria, daughter of Barry Yelverton, 1st Viscount Avonmore, in 1791. He died in May 1821 and was succeeded in the barony by his eldest son Charles. Lady Clanmorris died in 1865.

== Notes ==
Parliament of Ireland
Preceded by Sir Thomas Lighton, 1st Bt; Jonah Barrington	Member of Parliament for Tuam; 1798–1800; Served alongside: Walter Aglionby Yelverton	Succeeded by George Vesey; Walter Aglionby Yelverton
Peerage of Ireland
New creation	Baron Clanmorris; 1800 – 1821	Succeeded by Charles Barry Bingham
