= Viscount Avonmore =

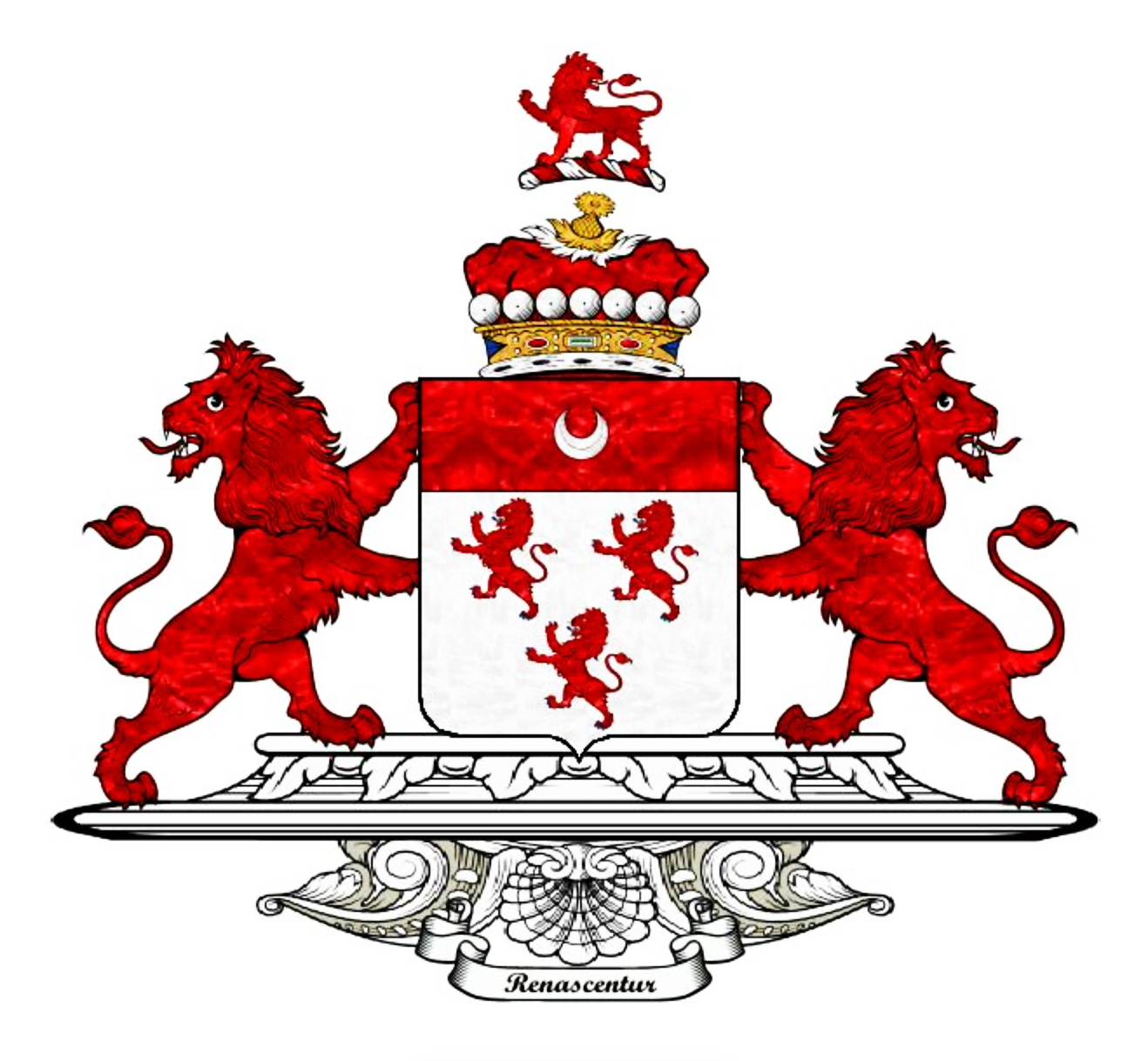
Viscount Avonmore Crest

Viscount Avonmore is a title in the Peerage of Ireland created on 29 December 1800 for the former Attorney-General for Ireland and Lord Chief Baron of the Exchequer for Ireland, Barry Yelverton, 1st Baron Yelverton. He had been created Baron Yelverton on 15 June 1795. The 4th Viscount fought numerous legal battles to prove that his first purported marriage to Theresa Longworth was illegal. Since the death of the 6th Viscount in 1910, both titles have been dormant. According to Cracroft's Peerage, heirs-male may exist in Australia.

== Viscounts Avonmore (1800) ==
- Barry Yelverton, 1st Viscount Avonmore (1736–1805)
- William Charles Yelverton, 2nd Viscount Avonmore (1762–1814)
- Barry John Yelverton, 3rd Viscount Avonmore (1790–1870)
- William Charles Yelverton, 4th Viscount Avonmore (1824–1883)
- Barry Nugent Yelverton, 5th Viscount Avonmore (1859–1885)
- Algernon William Yelverton, 6th Viscount Avonmore (1866–1910) (dormant)

== See also ==
- Hesilrige, Arthur G. M. (1921). Debrett's Peerage and Titles of courtesy. London: London: Dean & son, limited. p. 81.
- Leigh Rayment's Peerage Pages
