= River Irk =

River in Greater Manchester, England

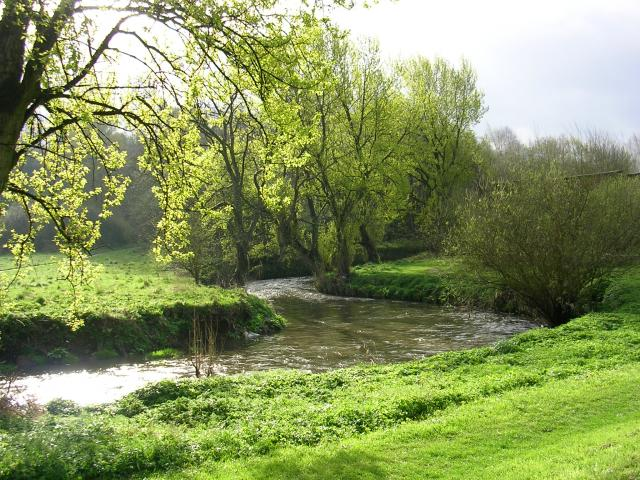
- The Irk at Crumpsall

- Location of the mouth within Greater Manchester

Location
- Country: England

Physical characteristics
- Source
  - location: Royton
- Mouth
  - location: River Irwell
  - coordinates: 53°29′12.93″N 2°14′42.13″W

The River Irk (/ɜːk/) is a river in the historic county of Lancashire in North West England that flows through the northern part of Greater Manchester. It rises to the east of Royton and runs west past Chadderton, Middleton and Blackley before merging with the River Irwell, a tributary of the River Mersey, in the centre of Manchester.

== History ==
The Irk's name is of obscure etymology, but may be Brittonic in origin and related to the Welsh word iwrch, meaning roebuck. The Afon Iwrch, a river in Denbighshire, also takes its name from this word.

In medieval times, there was a mill by the Irk at which the tenants of the manor ground their corn and its fisheries were controlled by the lord of the manor. In the 16th century, throwing carrion and other offensive matter into the Irk was forbidden. Water for Manchester was drawn from the river before the Industrial Revolution. A bridge over the Irk was recorded in 1381. The river was noted for destructive floods. In 1480, the burgesses of Manchester described the highway between Manchester and Collyhurst which "the water of Irk had worn out". In 1816, of seven bridges over the Irk, six were liable to be flooded after heavy rain but the seventh, the Ducie Bridge completed in 1814 was above flood levels.

According to The New Gazetteer of Lancashire (1830) the Irk had "more mill seats upon it than any other stream of its length in the Kingdom" and "the eels in this river were formerly remarkable for their fatness, which was attributed to the grease and oils expressed by the mills from the woollen cloths and mixed with the waters." However, by the start of the 20th century the Irk Valley between Crumpsall and Blackley had been left a neglected river, "not only the blackest but the most sluggish of all rivers".

Friedrich Engels described the banks of the Irk in Manchester at the height of the city's industrial excess.

The river has since been culverted as it reaches the city centre. It disappears beneath Manchester Victoria railway station into a brick tunnel at Ducie Bridge and empties into the Irwell beneath a railway viaduct.

On 15 August 1953, the front coach of a Manchester to Bury electric train fell from the viaduct over the River Irk after colliding with a local steam train. Ten people were killed and 58 injured in what became known as the Irk Valley Junction disaster.

== Tributaries ==
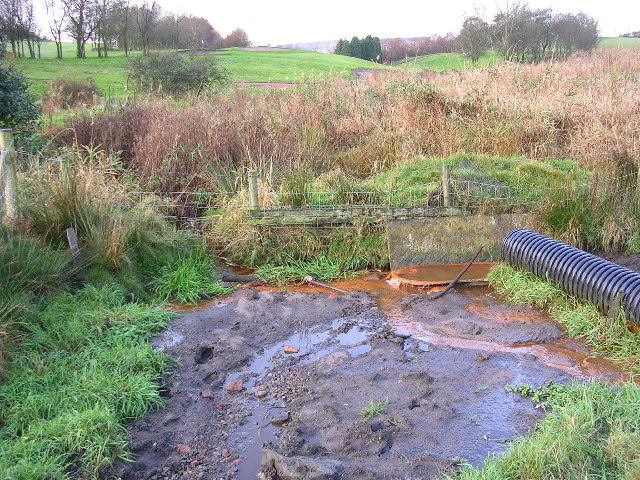
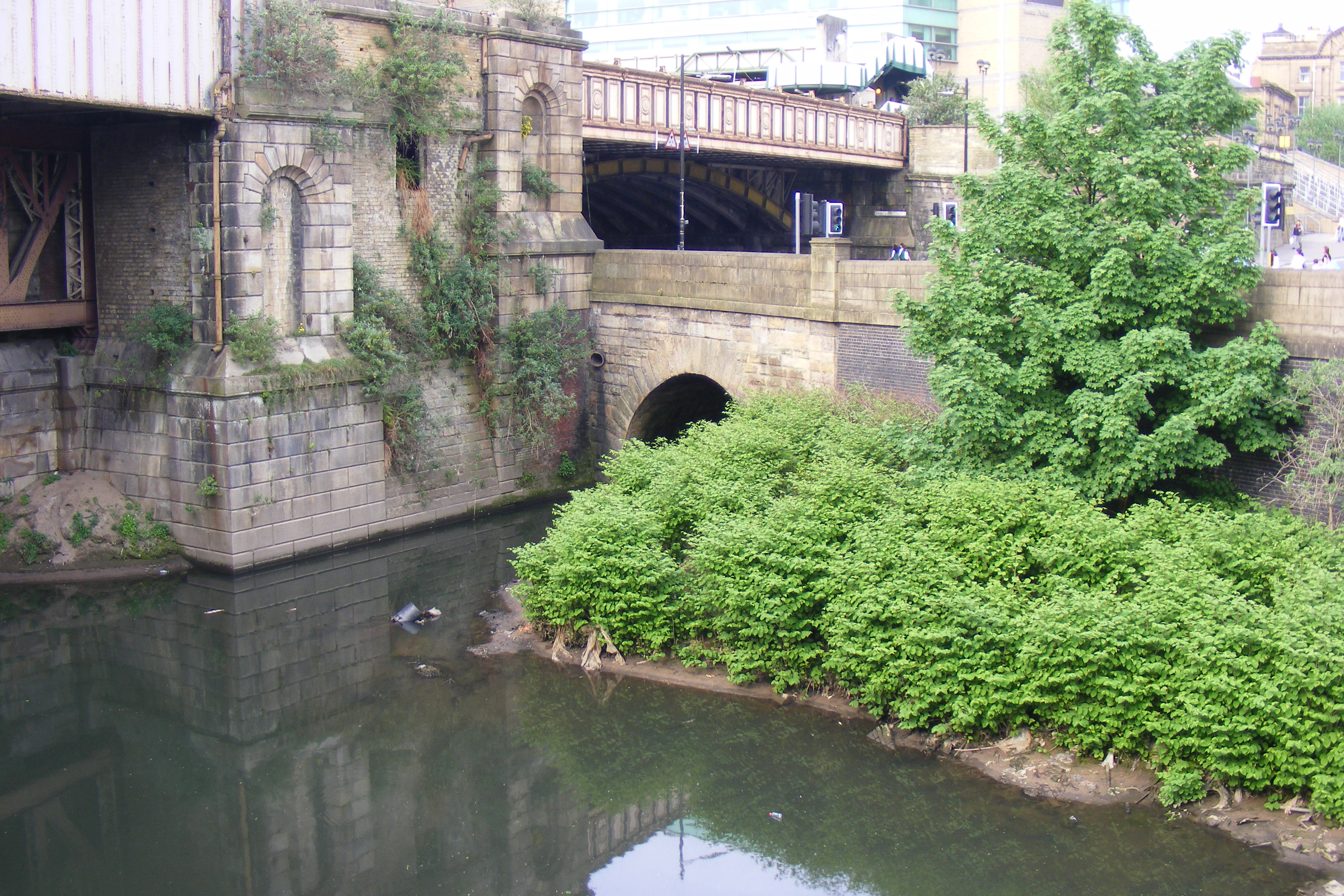
The source of the Irk (left) and its confluence with the Irwell (right)
- Moston Brook (later Moss Brook)
- Boggart Hole Brook
- Heaton Brook
- Boardman Brook
- Wince Brook
  - Springs Brook
- Whit Brook
  - Trub Brook
- Tandle Hill Brook
- Thorp Brook
- Luzley Brook
  - Long Brook

Next confluence upstream	River Irwell	Next confluence downstream
River Croal (West)	River Irk	River Medlock (East)
