= William Yelverton, 2nd Viscount Avonmore =

Irish nobleman

William Charles Yelverton, 2nd Viscount Avonmore (5 April 1762 – 28 November 1814), was an Irish nobleman. He was the son of Barry Yelverton, 1st Viscount Avonmore and Mary Nugent. He married Mary Reade, daughter of John Reade, on 1 September 1787. He held the office of Principal Registrar of the High Court of Chancery (Ireland). He succeeded his father in his titles in 1805. Avonmore died at Clytha in 1814 and was succeeded by his son Barry.

Children of William Charles Yelverton and Mary Reade:

- Hon. Mary Yelverton (1788–1859)
- Hon. Barry John Yelverton, 3rd Viscount Avonmore (1790–1870)
- Hon. William Henry Yelverton (1791–1884) of Whitland Abbey, married 1825, Elizabeth Lucy Morgan
- Hon. Louisa Sarah Yelverton (1795–1866), married 1825, Rev. Andrew Sayers
- Hon. Augustus Yelverton (1802–1864), married 1825, Sarah Whiteside

Peerage of Ireland
Preceded by Barry Yelverton	Viscount Avonmore; 1805–1814	Succeeded by Barry Yelverton
