= Waringstown House =

House in Waringstown, County Down, Northern Ireland

Coordinates: 54°25′54″N 6°17′59″W

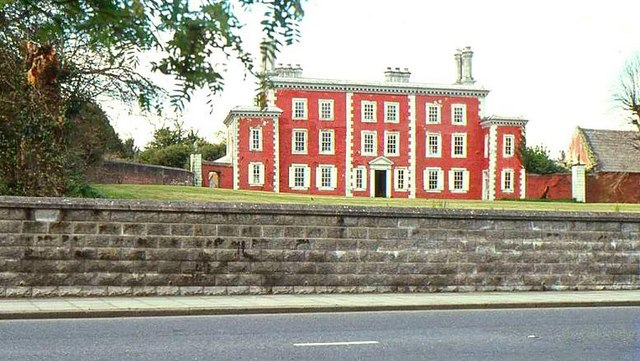
- Photographed in 1981
- Interactive map of the Waringstown House area

General information
- Architectural style: Jacobean
- Location: County Down, Northern Ireland
- Completed: 1667

Design and construction
- Architect: William Waring

Waringstown House is a 17th-century Grade A listed building located in the village of Waringstown, County Down, Northern Ireland. As the oldest unfortified mansion house in Ireland, it was home to family of the place's namesake, William Waring, who founded the village. Today the building remains the home of the family's descendants.

== History ==
As a descendant of a wealthy family based in Belfast, William Waring built the house in 1667 along with the nearby church as a place of worship for his family, servants and tenants. Originally constructed of mud-covered rubble, the building was designed for defense, with two large towers flanking the main entrance. At one point the house played guest to Frederick Schomberg, 1st Duke of Schomberg, and his troops during the Battle of the Boyne.
