= Edward Bingham =

Decorated Irish-born British naval officer

Rear-Admiral The Honourable Edward Bingham VC OBE
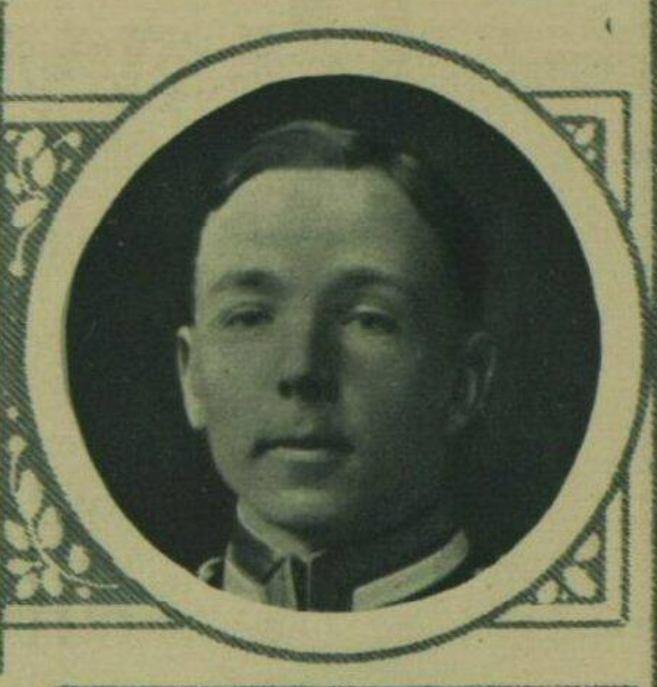
- Born: 26 July 1881; Bangor Castle, County Down, Ireland, UK
- Died: 24 September 1939 (aged 58); Central London, England, UK
- Burial place: Golders Green cemetery, London
- Relatives: John Bingham, 5th Baron Clanmorris (father)
- Military career
- Allegiance: United Kingdom
- Branch: Royal Navy
- Service years: 1895–1932
- Rank: Rear-Admiral
- Conflicts: World War I
- Awards: Victoria Cross; Order of the British Empire; Order of St. Stanislaus of Russia (2nd Class with swords)

Rear-Admiral The Honourable Edward Barry Stewart Bingham, VC, OBE (26 July 1881 – 24 September 1939) served in the Royal Navy during the First World War and was awarded the Victoria Cross for his actions in engaging the German fleet during the Battle of Jutland.

== Military career ==
The third son of Lord Clanmorris, Edward Bingham was born in Bangor Castle, County Down, Ireland. Educated at Arnold House and in HMS Britannia, he entered the Royal Navy in 1895 as an acting sub-lieutenant. He was confirmed as a sub-lieutenant 15 March 1901. At the beginning of the First World War, he was appointed Commander (Executive Officer) of HMS Invincible, which saw action at the Battle of the Falkland Islands in December 1914.

On 31 May 1916, during the Battle of Jutland off Denmark, Commander Bingham was in command of a destroyer division. He led his division in their attack, first on enemy destroyers and then on the battle cruisers of the German High Seas Fleet. Once the enemy was sighted Bingham ordered his own destroyer, HMS Nestor, and the one remaining destroyer of his division, HMS Nicator, to close to within 2,750 meters of the opposing battle fleet so that he could bring his torpedoes to bear. While making this attack Nestor and Nicator were under concentrated fire of the secondary batteries of the German fleet and Nestor was subsequently sunk. For his actions, Bingham earned the Victoria Cross, one of relatively few awarded for naval bravery during World War I.

Bingham was picked up by the Germans at Jutland, and remained a prisoner of war (latterly at Holzminden) until the Armistice. After the war, he remained with the Royal Navy and retired as a rear admiral in 1932. He was made an Officer of the Order of the British Empire. Bingham died in 1939 and is buried in the Golders Green cemetery in northwest London.

== Family ==
In 1915, Bingham married Vera Patterson; they had a son and a daughter. The marriage was dissolved in 1937.

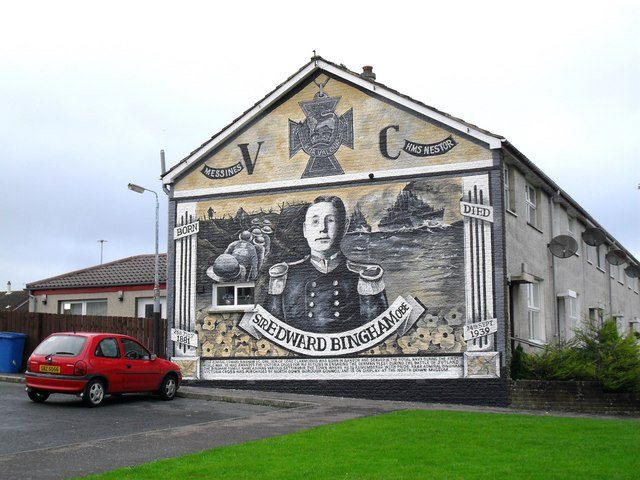
Mural in Kilcooley

== Victoria Cross medal ==
Bingham's Victoria Cross was auctioned by Sotheby's in 1983 and was purchased by the North Down Borough Council, County Down, who outbid a Canadian millionaire. It is on display at the North Downs Museum in Bangor Castle.

Bingham's Victoria Cross and his Order of St Stanislaus medal were both stolen by an opportunist thief in 2001. He was quickly caught and when the items were valued with help from the Imperial War Museum, at tens of thousands of pounds, the thief was charged with a major theft.

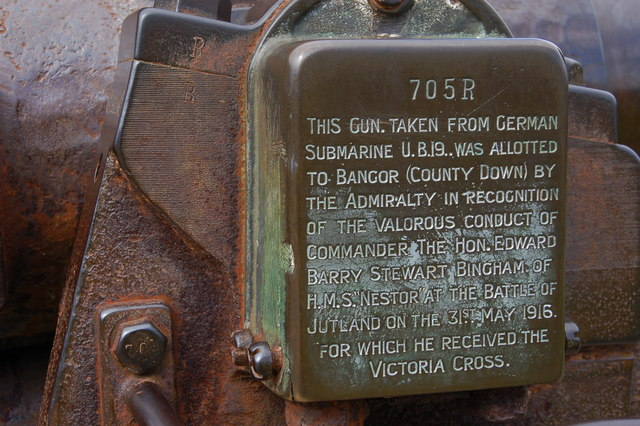
Engraving on a gun from German submarine U-19 in Bingham's hometown Bangor commemorating his Victoria Cross action

Medals
