= Barry Yelverton, 3rd Viscount Avonmore =

Irish noble

Barry John Yelverton, 3rd Viscount Avonmore (21 February 1790 – 24 October 1870), was an Irish nobleman.

He was the son of William Yelverton, 2nd Viscount Avonmore, and Mary Reade, eldest daughter of John Reade. In 1814, he succeeded his father as viscount.

He married, firstly, Jane Boothe, daughter of Thomas Boothe, in 1811 and had the following issue:

- Hon. Barry Charles Yelverton (1814–1853), heir apparent to the viscountcy, 1814–1853
- Hon. Sydney Eloisa Yelverton (1817–1883), married 1839, Forster Goring, son of Sir Charles Forster Goring, 7th Bt.
- Hon. George Frederick William Yelverton (1818–1860), married 1857, Louisa Lenox Prendergast; heir apparent to the viscountcy, 1853–1860
- Hon. Mary Augusta Yelverton (1820–1843)
- Hon. Adelaide Matilda Yelverton (1821–1884), married 1860, Lt-Gen Humphrey Lyons, Indian Army

His first wife having died in 1821, Lord Avonmore married secondly, Cecilia O'Keefe, daughter of Charles O'Keefe and Letitia Yelverton, on 1 August 1822. They had the following issue:

- Hon. Letitia Yelverton (1823–1897)
- Hon. William Charles Yelverton, 4th Viscount Avonmore (1824–1883)
- Hon. Louisa Elizabeth Yelverton (1827–1915), married 1873, Rudolph Hermann Hultzsch
- Hon. Cecilia Priscilla Yelverton (1829–1854), married 1853, Colonel George Harrington Hawes
- Hon. Walter Algionby Yelverton (1832–1844)
- Hon. Anna Yelverton (1833–1910), married 1859, James Walker
- Hon. Maletta Yelverton (1839–1910), married 1868, Captain Crofton Thomas Burton Vandeleur

Lord Avonmore died in Dublin and was succeeded in the viscountcy by his third and only surviving son, William.

Peerage of Ireland
Preceded by William Yelverton	Viscount Avonmore; 1814–1870	Succeeded by William Yelverton
