= Theresa Yelverton =

English writer (c.1827/33–1881)

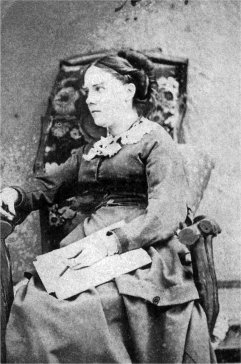
- Theresa Yelverton in Yosemite, 1870
- Born: Manchester, Lancashire, England
- Died: 13 September 1881

Theresa Yelverton (née Maria Theresa Longworth; c. 1827–33 – 13 September 1881) was an English writer who became notorious because of her involvement in the Yelverton case, a 19th-century Irish law case, which eventually resulted in a change to the law on mixed religion marriages in Ireland.

== Life to 1857 ==
Maria Theresa Longworth was born in Cheetwood, Manchester, Lancashire, England, the youngest of six children born to Thomas Longworth, a silk manufacturer and his wife Ann Fox, who soon died. She was educated at Boulogne-sur-Mer in a convent of Ursuline nuns. A Roman Catholic convert, she subsequently returned to her father's house in Smedley, where they fell out over religion.

She first met Major William Charles Yelverton, who from 1870 was 4th Viscount Avonmore, while aboard a steamer on the English Channel in August 1852. After this meeting, she completed her education, going to Italy. In Naples, she heard Yelverton was in Malta, and wrote to him asking for a favour; they began a correspondence. She returned to England, and nursed her dying father, and was there in 1854.

Theresa Longworth was then a nurse for the Daughters of Charity of Saint Vincent de Paul (Sisters of Charity) during the Crimean War. She and Yelverton met again in 1855 at Galata Hospital in Constantinople. After the war was over, she visited the Crimea in March 1856, as the guest of Charles van Straubenzee and his wife. Yelverton saw her there socially.

== Marriages and court cases ==
After some years of courtship with Theresa Longworth, Yelverton was posted to Edinburgh in early 1857. Theresa was staying there, with a friend who was another Catholic convert and a Sister of Charity, Arabella, daughter of Charles Macfarlane. Yelverton called on her, and their relationship, considered to be between engaged persons, became intimate.

Theresa Longworth participated in two ceremonies of marriage with Yelverton.

1. In the first, on 12 April 1857 the couple went through a ceremony of marriage at 1 Vincent Street, Edinburgh, Theresa's lodgings, according to the Book of Common Prayer of the Church of England, read out by Yelverton.
2. In the second, she wed him secretly on 15 August 1857 in a Roman Catholic chapel near Rostrevor, County Down, Ireland. This was an exchange of vows before the altar at Killowen, witnessed by a priest, Bernard Mooney, who had previously consulted John Pius Leahy, coadjutor bishop of the Roman Catholic Diocese of Dromore.

Yelverton later argued that Theresa did not believe that either of the ceremonies was a valid marriage. He was married on 26 June 1858, to Emily Marianne née Ashworth, daughter of Charles Ashworth and widow of Edward Forbes. Officiating was Edward Ramsay of the Scottish Episcopal Church. Theresa heard of this marriage three days later, and on 30 June a Catholic cleric showed Ramsay a copy of the certificate of the August 1857 Irish ceremony.

The immediate consequence was that Theresa applied to the Edinburgh procurator fiscal, and Yelverton was put in Calton Jail on a bigamy charge. The charge was later dropped. Yelverton asked for a further court declaration that he was not married to Theresa, and further legal proceedings ensued.

There was then a series of trials: most notably, Thelwall v. Yelverton, between 21 February and 4 March 1861. Its outcome was validation of both the ceremonies. Then on appeal the Court of Session annulled Theresa's marriage to Yelverton.

Towards the end of the legal processes, Theresa in 1867 made a "reference to oath" (an aspect of the Scottish law of evidence based on Roman law) to the House of Lords. The Lords denied the appeal based on it, which Theresa argued herself. The court cases came to an end in 1868. Yelverton allegedly used his influence with the House of Lords.

== Reputational damage ==
The legal struggle brought the couple notoriety.

Theresa was alternately vilified and celebrated, portrayed as a victim who had been 'mercilessly abandoned' and accused of being a lascivious seducer. Sometimes she was depicted as innocent and pure, at others as a ruthless social climber. After six years of trials and appeals, she finally lost her case. In the process, however, she had become a minor celebrity.

Yelverton lost his army position as an officer in the Royal Artillery, being placed on half pay.

== Later life ==
Afterwards, she led an itinerant life and supported herself by writing about her travels. Francis Farquhar wrote that she "spent the summer of 1870 in Yosemite, where she attached herself to the Hutchings family and made eyes at John Muir. He escaped to the woods, but not before she had noted enough of his conversation and his ways of life to make him over into Kenmuir, the hero of her novel."

== Death ==
She died in 1881 in Pietermaritzburg, Natal, South Africa.

== In literature ==
Two novels of the 1860s were based on the story and legal cases: Gentle Blood: Or, the Secret Marriage (1861) by James Roderick O'Flanagan; and A Wife and not a Wife (1867) by Cyrus Redding.
