= Bangor Castle =

Municipal building in Bangor, Northern Ireland

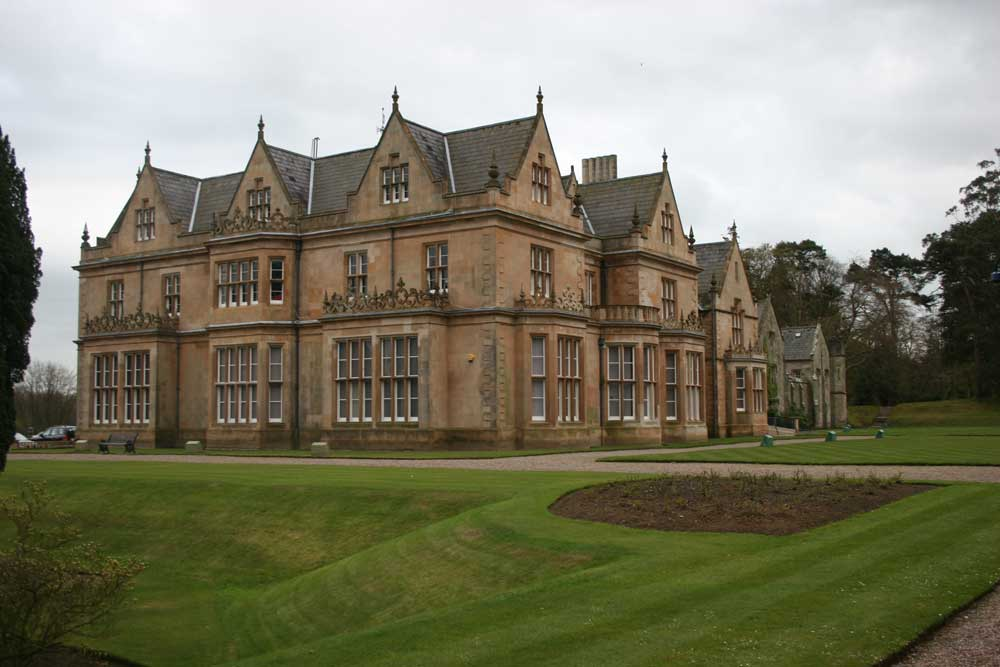
- The northwest corner of Bangor Castle

- Shown in Northern Ireland
- 54.6564°N 5.6694°W
- Location: Castle Park, Bangor

History
- Built: 1852

Site notes
- Architect: William Burn
- Architectural style: Jacobethan style

Listed Building – Grade A
- Official name: Town Hall, Bangor Castle, Castle Park Avenue, Bangor, Co Down
- Designated: 6 January 1975
- Reference no.: HB 23/07/001

Bangor Castle is a country house situated in Castle Park in Bangor, County Down, Northern Ireland. The building, which is also referred to as Bangor City Hall and is now used as the offices of Ards and North Down Borough Council, is a Grade A listed building.

== History ==
The site was first occupied by Bangor Abbey which was founded by St. Comgall in 558 and was home to Franciscan friars until the dissolution of the monasteries in 1542. A mansion was built on the site for Sir James Hamilton, who had acted as an agent and informant for King James I, in around 1611: it was remodelled in the late 18th century.

The current building was commissioned by The Hon Robert Edward Ward, who had served as High Sheriff of Down for 1842 and was a brother of the 3rd Viscount Bangor. It was designed by the Scottish architect, William Burn, in the Jacobethan style, built in ashlar stone and was completed in 1852. The design involved an asymmetrical main frontage with five bays facing east. The first bay on the left featured a three-stage castellated tower with a corner clock turret, which was surmounted by a pyramid-shaped roof and a weather vane. The second bay, which contained a porch with an arched doorway, the third bay and the fourth bay were all recessed: they were fenestrated by mullioned and transomed windows on the lower floors and by dormer windows at attic level. The right hand two bays were also fenestrated by mullioned and transomed windows but were gabled. Internally, the mansion contained 35 bedrooms and a huge salon for musical recitals: the violinist, William Henley, performed in the chamber at a concert hosted by the Belfast Orchestral Society in July 1893.

Ward's only daughter and heiress, Matilda Catherine Maude, married the 5th Baron Clanmorris in 1878. After his death in 1916, Lady Clanmorris retained possession of the house until her own death in 1941. After the then local authority, Bangor Borough Council, bought the castle and grounds in 1941, the music saloon was converted into a council chamber, and the council, which had previously been based in Main Street, relocated to the castle in 1952. The building continued to serve as the headquarters of the borough council and, after local government reorganisation in 1973, it went to become the meeting place of North Down Borough Council. North Down Borough Council merged with Ards Borough Council in 2015 and the building then became the meeting place of the combined authority, Ards and North Down Borough Council.

The gardens, designed by the Ward family in the 1840s, have won many awards for their outstanding blooms and are open to the public. The building also hosts a museum to the Ward and Bingham families, which includes the Victoria Cross awarded to Commander The Hon. Edward Bingham, son of the 5th Baron Clanmorris. Works of art in the building include a portrait by Edwin Long of Charles V.

Bangor Castle was used as a film location for the 2017 movie "The Bookshop" starring Emily Mortimer and Bill Nighy.

In January 2025, the Council announced it was moving its offices out of the Castle and seeking alternative uses, such as hotel, museum or arts centre.

== See also ==
- List of Grade A listed buildings in County Down
