= William Yelverton, 4th Viscount Avonmore =

Irish nobleman & soldier (1824–1883)

Major The Rt. Hon. William Charles Yelverton, 4th Viscount Avonmore (27 September 1824 – 1 April 1883 in Biarritz), was an Irish nobleman and soldier. He was the son of The 3rd Viscount Avonmore and Cecilia O'Keeffe. Major William Charles Yelverton gained the rank of Major in the service of the Royal Artillery. He was invested as a Knight, Order of the Medjidie 5th class. He was usually known to family and friends as Charles.

== Marriages ==
The Hon. William Charles Yelverton (as he was styled 1824–1870) married, firstly, Maria Theresa Longworth (died 1881) on 15 August 1857 in Rostrevor, County Down, Ireland. The marriage was dissolved. The union was childless.

He married, secondly, Mrs. Emily Marianne Forbes (née Ashworth), daughter of Maj.-Gen. Sir Charles Ashworth and Mary Anne Rooke, on 26 June 1858, in Trinity Chapel, Edinburgh, Scotland; Emily Forbes, at the time of the marriage, was the widow of Prof. Edward Forbes, the naturalist.

== Thelwall v. Yelverton lawsuit ==
The validity of his first marriage was tested in the Yelverton case, a 19th-century Irish law case, which eventually resulted in a change to the law on mixed religion marriages in Ireland.

Under a Statute of King George II (19 Geo. 2. c. 13), any marriage between a Catholic (Popish) and a Protestant or a marriage between two Protestants celebrated by a Catholic priest was null and void. Between 21 February 1861 and 4 March 1861, the trial of Thelwall v. Yelverton found that even though Major Yelverton was a Protestant, and Miss Longworth a Roman Catholic, and though they had been married by a Roman Catholic priest, the marriage was valid. In March 1861 he was suspended from all military duties. On 28 July 1864 on appeal, the decision of Thelwall v. Yelverton was reversed, and the House of Lords decided that William's first marriage was illegal, and therefore his second marriage was valid.

== Children ==
Major The Hon. William Charles Yelverton and Mrs. Emily Marianne Yelverton (née Ashworth) had four children:

- Captain The Hon. Barry Nugent Yelverton, 5th Viscount Avonmore (1859–1885)
- William Walter Aglionby Yelverton (1860–1861)
- Olive Ursula Yelverton (1861–1861)
- Hon. Algernon William Yelverton, 6th Viscount Avonmore (1866–1910)

== Later life ==
Major Yelverton outlived his older brother, thus succeeding his father in the viscountcy in the Peerage of Ireland in October 1870. Henceforth he was styled as The Rt. Hon. The 4th Viscount Avonmore.

Lord Avonmore died in Biarritz in April 1883.

== See also ==
- Viscount Avonmore

Peerage of Ireland
Preceded by Barry Yelverton	Viscount Avonmore; 1870–1883	Succeeded by Barry Yelverton
