= Barry Yelverton, 1st Viscount Avonmore =

Irish judge and politician

Barry Yelverton, 1st Viscount Avonmore, PC (Ire) KC (28 May 1736 – 19 August 1805), was an Irish judge and politician, who gave his name to Yelverton's Act 1782, which effectively repealed Poynings' Law and thus restored the independence of the Parliament of Ireland. This achievement was destroyed by the Act of Union 1800, which Yelverton supported. By doing so, he gravely harmed his reputation for integrity, which had already been damaged by his leading role in the conviction and execution for treason of the United Irishman William Orr, which is now seen as a major miscarriage of justice.

== Early life ==
Born at Newmarket, County Cork, he was the eldest son of Francis Yelverton of Kanturk, County Cork, and Elizabeth Barry, daughter of Jonas Barry of Kilbrin (now Ballyclogh, County Cork). His father died when Barry was only ten; his mother reached a great age, dying only a year before her son. He went to school in Charleville and Midleton College, and attended Trinity College Dublin, where he took a degree of Bachelor of Arts in 1757 and of Bachelor of Laws in 1761. His family lacked wealth and social position and he was for some years an assistant master under Andrew Buck in the Hibernian Academy. This menial occupation was later a source of great embarrassment to him, as his enemies loved to ridicule him as "Buck's usher".

In 1761, he married Mary Nugent (died 1802), daughter of William Nugent of Clonlost, County Westmeath, and his wife Ursula Aglionby, a lady of some fortune, and was thus enabled to read for the Irish Bar, entering the Middle Temple.

He was called to the Bar in 1764: despite his lack of family connections his success in his profession was rapid, due to his legal ability, charm and remarkable eloquence, and he took silk eight years afterwards.

== M.P. ==
He was elected to the Irish House of Commons as member for Donegal Borough from 1774 to 1776. In the latter year, Yelverton was elected for both Belfast and Carrickfergus. He chose to sit for the latter constituency and represented Carrickfergus until 1784. Although few examples of his oratory survive, all contemporaries agree on his eloquence, which gave him a dominant position in the Commons. He also served as Recorder of Carrickfergus from 1778 until his death. This was not a Crown appointment: the Recorder was elected by a vote of the entire town corporation.

== Judicial career ==
He became Attorney-General for Ireland in 1782, and was elevated to the bench as Lord Chief Baron of the Exchequer in 1783. He was created Baron Yelverton in 1795, and in 1800 Viscount Avonmore in the Peerage of Ireland. As Chief Baron, he led the opposition to the proposal to increase the number of judges in each of the courts of common law from three to four, on the practical ground that four-judge courts often divide evenly and thus cannot reach an effective decision. Despite this common-sense view, the new judges were eventually appointed.

=== William Orr ===
In 1797 he attained a degree of infamy for presiding over what was widely regarded as a "show trial" which led to the execution of the United Irishman, William Orr (although Yelverton is said to have shed tears when passing the death sentence on Orr). Orr was charged with administering the United Irish oath to a soldier called Hugh Wheatly; this had recently become a capital offence. In fact, it was generally believed that another man, William McKeever, administered the oath. Wheatly, who was the principal witness for the prosecution, later confessed that he had perjured himself, but despite a superb defence by John Philpot Curran, Orr was found guilty and hanged. Yelverton may have formed an early impression of Orr's guilt and acted on it – even his admirers admitted that as a judge he lacked impartiality.

Peter Finnerty, a journalist, was later convicted of seditious libel for publishing an attack on Yelverton over his conduct of Orr's trial: this did nothing to enhance the judge's reputation.

== Death ==
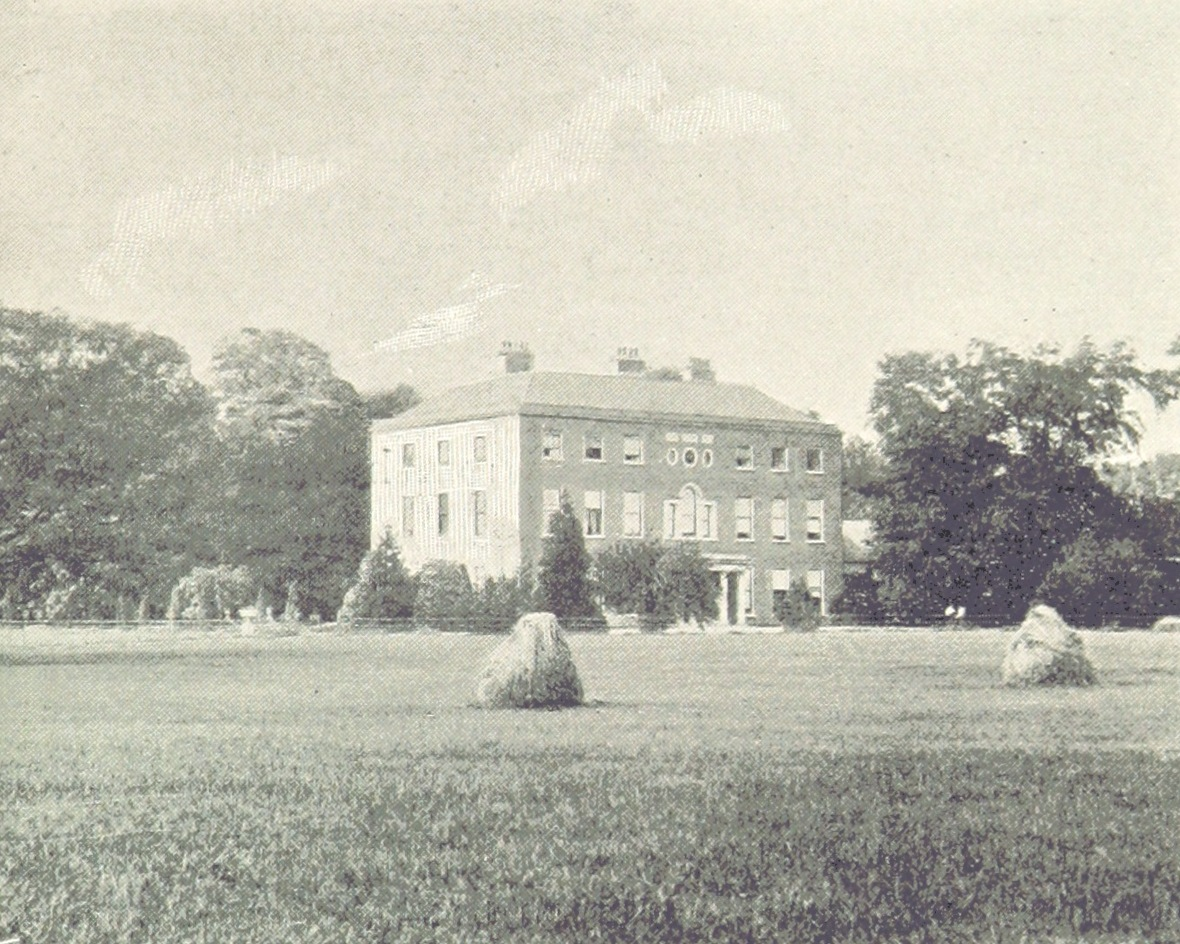
Fortfield House, Terenure

He died in 1805 at his mansion, Fortfield House, Terenure, County Dublin, which he had built at great expense around 1785.

== Personality ==
To his colleagues at the Irish bar, Yelverton was a popular and charming companion: even John Philpot Curran, despite their frequent courtroom clashes, seems to have liked Yelverton personally. Curran and Yelverton were co-founders of the popular drinking club called The Monks of the Screw. Being a man of insignificant physical appearance, he owed his early successes to his remarkable eloquence, which made a great impression on his contemporaries; as a judge, he was inclined to take the view of the advocate rather than that of the impartial lawyer. Ball considered him one of the most learned judges of his time. While Edward Cooke called him "a brute", this simply reflects Cooke's low opinion of all the Irish judges of his time. Sir Jonah Barrington wrote that for all Yelverton's faults, and his lack of any real moral code, it was impossible not to like and respect him.

== Politician ==
He gave his support to Henry Grattan and the Whigs during the greater part of his parliamentary career. He was a strong supporter of the demand for an independent Irish Parliament, but later changed his stance.

=== Yelverton's Act ===
He played a crucial role in the reforms which are collectively called the Irish Constitution of 1782. In particular he sponsored the Act 21 and 22 of George III, An Act to regulate the manner of passing bills and to prevent delays in summoning of Parliaments- which was popularly known as "Yelverton's Act". This radically modified Poynings' Law of 1495 by which all legislation to be passed by the Irish Parliament had to be drafted by the Privy Council of Ireland, then sent to the English privy council for approval. Under Yelverton's Act, the role of the Irish Privy Council was abolished and legislation was commenced in the normal way in the Irish Parliament, which for the last 17 years of its existence enjoyed a wide measure of independence.

=== Act of Union ===
In his latter days, he became identified with the court party and voted for the Act of Union 1800, for which his viscounty was a reward. For this he was never forgiven by many of his former friends. Sir Jonah Barrington, who continued to regard Yelverton with affection and respect, regretted that this action should have destroyed his reputation forever; but he argued that such a mistake of judgment was understandable in a man who lacked worldly wisdom, and despite his many good qualities, did not have a strong moral sense.

He became a member of the Royal Irish Academy in 1787.

== Family ==
He had three sons and one daughter, and the title descended in the family.

Children of Barry Yelverton and Mary Nugent:

- Hon. William Charles Yelverton, 2nd Viscount Avonmore (5 April 1762 – 28 November 1814)
- Hon. Barry Yelverton (22 November 1763 – June 1824)
- Hon. Walter Aglionby Yelverton (26 January 1772 – 3 June 1824), married 1791, Cecilia Yelverton
- Hon. Anna Maria Yelverton (28 September 1775 – 27 April 1865), married 1791, John Bingham, 1st Baron Clanmorris of Newbrook

Parliament of Ireland
| Preceded by Viscount Sudley; Richard Gore | Member of Parliament for Donegal Borough; 1774–1776; With: Richard Gore 1774–1776; James Cuffe 1776 | Succeeded by Henry Vaughan Brooke; James Cuffe |
| Preceded by Hon. Henry Skeffington; George Hamilton | Member of Parliament for Belfast; 1776–1777; With: Hon. Henry Skeffington | Succeeded by Hon. Henry Skeffington; Alexander Crookshank |
| Preceded by John Chichester; Conway Richard Dobbs | Member of Parliament for Carrickfergus; 1776–1784; With: Conway Richard Dobbs | Succeeded by Waddell Cunningham; Conway Richard Dobbs |
Legal offices
| Preceded by John Scott | Attorney-General for Ireland; 1782–1783 | Succeeded by John FitzGibbon |
| Preceded by Walter Hussey Burgh | Lord Chief Baron of the Exchequer for Ireland; 1783–1805 | Succeeded by Standish O'Grady |
Peerage of Ireland
| New creation | Viscount Avonmore; 1800–1805 | Succeeded by William Yelverton |
| New creation | Baron Yelverton; 1795–1805 | Succeeded by William Yelverton |
