= Charles Ashworth =

Major-General Sir Charles Ashworth KCB
- Born: c. 1784
- Died: 13 August 1832 (aged 48); Hall Place, St John's Wood
- Burial place: St Marylebone Parish Church
- Military career
- Allegiance: United Kingdom
- Branch: British Army; Portuguese Army
- Service years: 1798–1832
- Rank: Major-General
- Conflicts: French Revolutionary Wars; West Indies campaign; Napoleonic Wars; West Indies campaign; Peninsular War; Battle of Bussaco; Battle of Fuentes d'Onoro; Battle of Arroyo dos Molinos; Battle of Almaraz; Battle of Vitoria; Battle of the Pyrenees (WIA); Battle of Nivelle; Battle of the Nive; Battle of St Pierre (WIA)
- Awards: Army Gold Medal; Military Order of the Tower and Sword (Portugal)

Major-General Sir Charles Ashworth KCB (c. 1784 – 13 August 1832) was an Anglo-Irish British Army officer who was prominent in the Peninsular War.

== Life ==
He was appointed ensign in the 68th foot in 1798 and lieutenant in 1799. He captain 55th foot in 1801, major 6th West India Regiment in 1808, and major 62nd foot in 1808. He was a lieutenant-colonel with the Portuguese army in 1810, and served as brigadier-general at the battles of Vittoria, Pyrenees, Nivelle, Nive, and St. Pierre, where he was badly wounded.

He took part in the combat of Buenza and succeeding engagements, for which he was honoured with a cross, and allowed, 14 November 1814, to accept the order of the Tower and Sword from the Prince Regent of Portugal. He attained the rank of colonel in 1814, and major-general in 1825; was nominated a companion of the Bath in 1815; and a knight commander on the occasion of the coronation of William IV in September 1831.

He died at Hall Place, St. John's Wood, on 13 August 1832, aged 48.
