= Wythenshawe Interchange =

Bus station in Greater Manchester, England

Wythenshawe
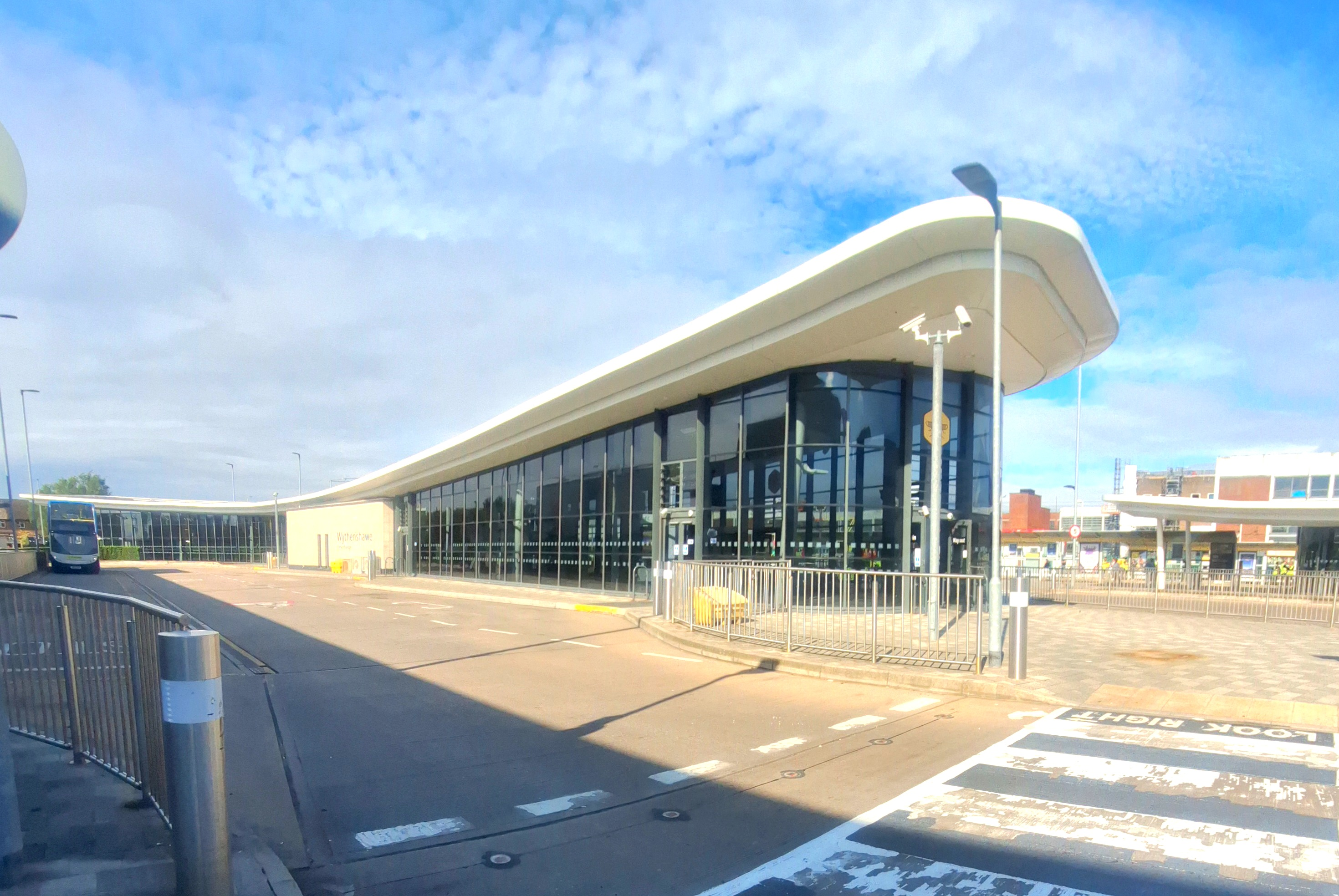
- The bus station and Metrolink stop in July 2026

General information
- Location: Wythenshawe, Manchester metropolitan borough, England
- Coordinates: 53°22′49.79″N 2°15′35.41″W
- Operator: Transport for Greater Manchester
- Bus routes: 11 43 101 103 130 248 249 368
- Bus stands: 7 (Arrivals, A-F)
- Bus operators: Metroline Manchester; Stagecoach Manchester; D&G Bus; High Peak Buses
- Connections: Wythenshawe Town Centre tram stop

Other information
- Website: https://tfgm.com/travel-updates/live-departures/bus/wythenshawe-interchange-bus

History
- Opened: 1981 (original bus station); 2015 (current bus station)
Location

Wythenshawe Interchange serves the Wythenshawe area of the Manchester metropolitan borough, in Greater Manchester, England. It is operated by Transport for Greater Manchester (TfGM), under the Bee Network brand.

== History ==
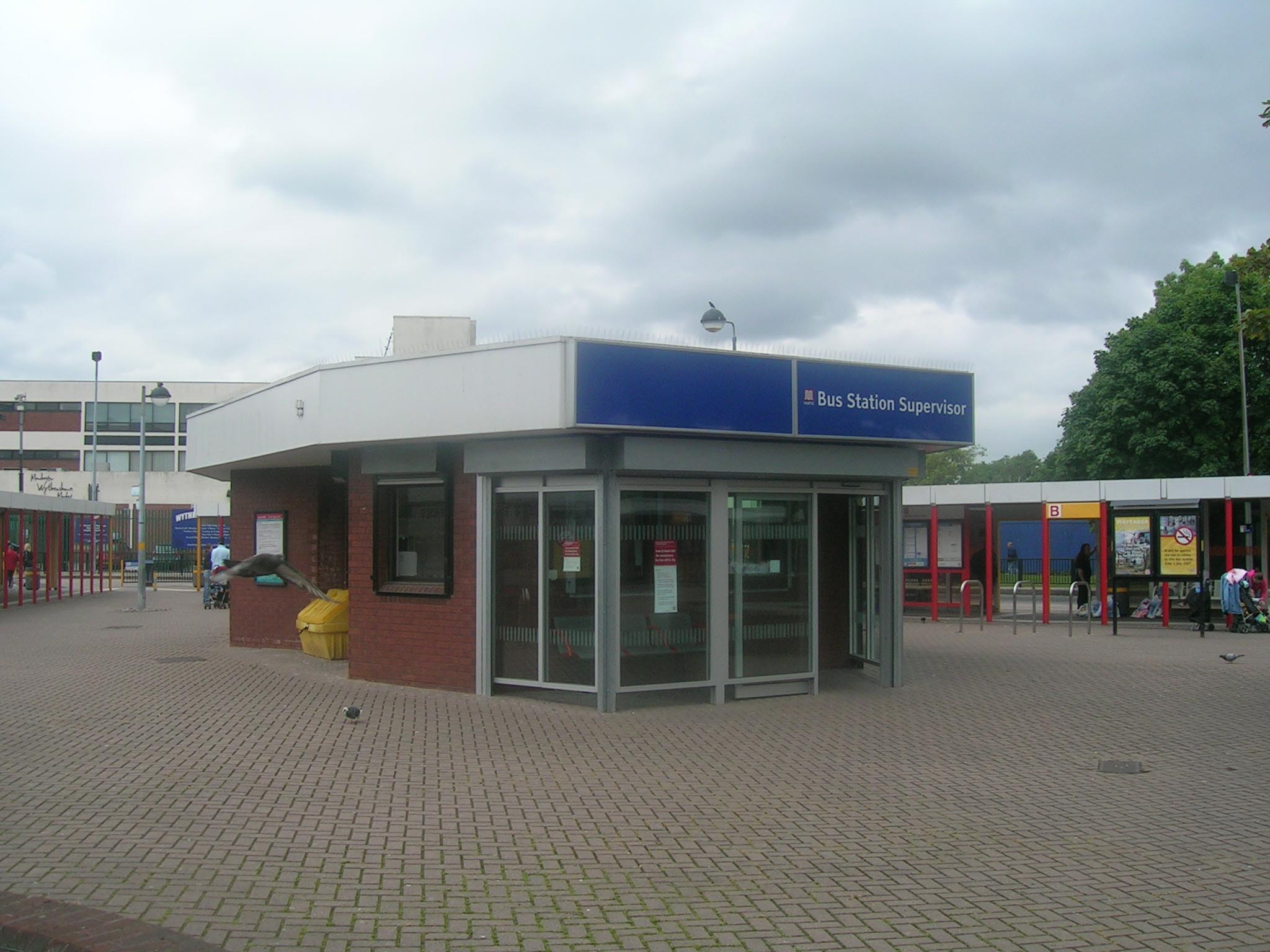
Original bus station in 2007

The bus station was opened by the Greater Manchester Passenger Transport Executive (GMPTE) in 1981. It was divided into two parts:

- the main station (stands A-H)
- the Forum (stands K-N).

In conjunction with the opening of the Manchester Metrolink Airport Line, the station was partially demolished and rebuilt in 2015. The new bus station is located next to Wythenshawe Town Centre Metrolink stop, and the number of stands was reduced to 6 (A-F).

== Services ==
The majority of services in Greater Manchester were operated by Metroline Manchester, under contract to the Bee Network, with the remainder run by Stagecoach Manchester. High Peak Buses and D&G Bus operate a route to Macclesfield, in Cheshire.

Routes connect the area with Altrincham, Manchester city centre, Manchester Airport, Stockport, Wythenshawe Hospital, Cheadle, Gatley, the Trafford Centre, Northenden, Sale, Stretford and Urmston.
