= Gorsey Bank tram stop =

Gorsey Bank

General information
- Location: Gorsey Bank, Stockport; England
- System: Metrolink station

Other information
- Status: Proposed station

Gorsey Bank is a proposed tram stop in Stockport, Greater Manchester, England. The proposed tram extension was proposed in 2004 but dropped on cost ground. It was revived after it was announced that the plans were revived to extend the line to Stockport.

== History ==
An extension to the line from East Didsbury to Stockport was planned in 2004, and GMPTE applied for powers to build it. However, the process came to a halt when the big bang extension was stopped.

The proposed extension would have reused some of the former railway alignment. However some of it was built on or filled in after closure, making re-opening more difficult, so the proposed line would have included some new infrastructure and street running sections to take it into Stockport. In these plans, the line would have terminated at Stockport bus station.

Preceding station	Manchester Metrolink	Following station
East Didsbury Terminus	Stockport Line (proposed)	Heaton Mersey towards Stockport Interchange
