= Kings Reach tram stop =

Kings Reach

General information
- Location: Kings Reach, Stockport; England
- System: Metrolink station

Other information
- Status: Proposed station

Kings Reach was a proposed tram stop in Kings Reach, Greater Manchester. The Stockport tram extension was proposed in 1999, but dropped in 2004 on cost grounds.

== History ==
An extension to the line from East Didsbury to Stockport was first planned in 1999, and GMPTE applied for powers to build it. However, the process came to a halt in 2004 when the big bang extension was stopped.

The proposed extension would have reused some of the former railway alignment. However much of it was built on or filled in after closure, making re-opening more difficult, so the proposed line would have included some new infrastructure and street running sections to take it into Stockport. In these plans, the line would have terminated at Stockport bus station. 2015 plans revive the idea of extending the line from East Didsbury to Stockport, but via a different route using some existing rail lines, with no mention of a station at King's Reach.

Preceding station	Manchester Metrolink	Following station
Heaton Mersey towards Rochdale Town Centre	Stockport Line (proposed)	Stockport Interchange Terminus
