= Cheadle Heath =

Suburb of Stockport, Greater Manchester, England

Coordinates: 53.3986°N 2.189°W

- Location within Greater Manchester
- Area: 3.01 km^{2} (1.16 sq mi)
- Population: 14,176
  - Density: 4,710/km^{2} (12,200/sq mi)
- Metropolitan borough: Stockport
- Metropolitan county: Greater Manchester
- Region: North West
- Country: England
- Sovereign state: United Kingdom
- Post town: STOCKPORT
- Postcode district: SK3
- Dialling code: 0161
- Police: Greater Manchester
- Fire: Greater Manchester
- Ambulance: North West

Cheadle Heath /ˈtʃiːdəl ˈhiːθ/ is a suburb of Stockport, Greater Manchester, England, 2 miles (3.2 km) west of the town centre and 8 miles (13 km) southeast of Manchester.

Cheadle Heath railway station, on the site now occupied by Morrisons supermarket, closed in 1967.

It is home to Cheadle Heath Nomads Football Club.

== Industry ==
Cheadle Heath is home to a number of engineering companies including Thales Underwater Systems, a company formed from the sonar activities of Ferranti.

The engineering company Henry Simon Ltd built a large factory and office complex on Bird Hall Lane 1924-26. Later the whole of extensive engineering business was moved to Cheadle Heath. The distinctive tower at the front of the research and development block was used to test experimental flour milling machinery. Most of the site is now demolished. Nearby was the Oil Well Engineering Company, a manufacturer of oil exploration drilling equipment that closed down in 1998.

The former Gorsey Bank council estate in Cheadle Heath, notorious for vandalism and antisocial behaviour, has been demolished and is now the Aurora Business Park after a £10 million investment from Stockport Metropolitan Borough Council.
