= Bee Card =

Bee Card may refer to:

- Bee Card (game cartridge), software distribution medium for MSX computers
- Bee Card (New Zealand), electronic public transport fare payment card in New Zealand
- Bee Card (Manchester), electronic public transport fare payment card in England

== See also ==
- Beer card
