= Heaton Mersey tram stop =

Heaton Mersey

General information
- Location: Heaton Mersey, Stockport; England
- System: Metrolink station

Other information
- Status: Proposed station

Heaton Mersey was a proposed tram stop in Heaton Mersey, Greater Manchester. The proposed tram extension was first consulted on in 1999, but plans were dropped in 2004.

== History ==
An extension to the line from East Didsbury to Stockport was first proposed in 1999, and GMPTE applied for powers to build it. However, the process came to a halt in 2004 when the big bang extension was stopped.

The proposed extension would have reused some of the former railway alignment. However much of it was built on or filled in after closure, making re-opening more difficult, so the proposed line would have included some new infrastructure and street running sections to take it into Stockport. In these plans, the line would have terminated at Stockport bus station.

| Preceding station | Manchester Metrolink | Following station |
|---|---|---|
| Gorsey Bank towards East Didsbury | Stockport Line (proposed) | Kings Reach towards Stockport Interchange |
