= Stockport Interchange =

Transport hub in Greater Manchester, England

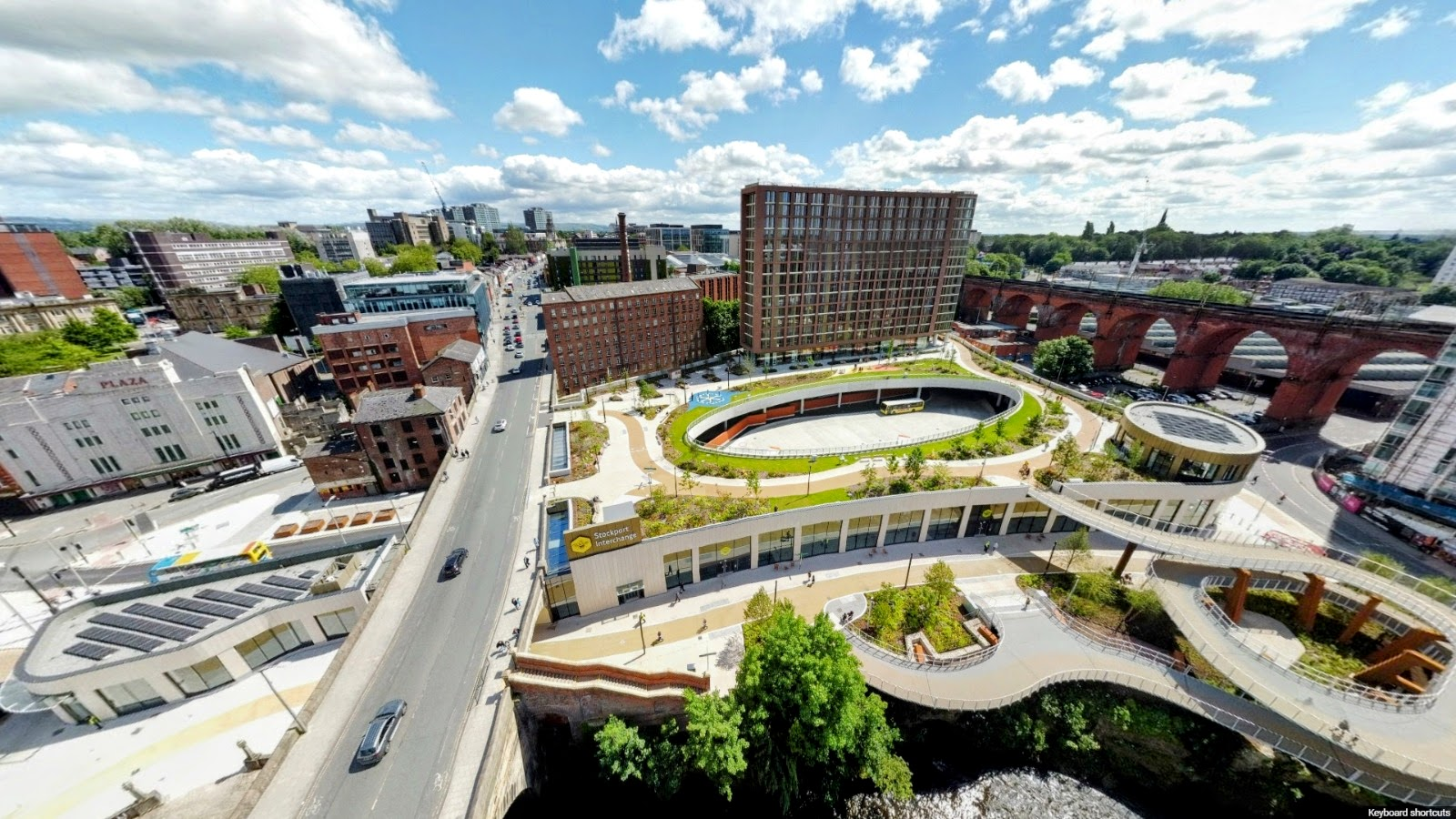
- A view of Viaduct Park on the roof with the helix foot- and cycle-path, 2024

General information
- Location: Chestergate, Stockport, Metropolitan Borough of Stockport, England
- Coordinates: 53.409°N 2.163°W
- Transit authority: Transport for Greater Manchester
- Bus routes: 7 11 23 25 42 197 199 203 309 310 312 313 314 322 325 327 330 358 368 370 371 374 378 378A 379 383 384 385 391
- Bus stands: 18 (Arrivals, A–S excluding I, O)
- Bus operators: Stagecoach Manchester; Metroline Manchester; Diamond North West; High Peak Buses; Belle Vue Coaches

Construction
- Architect: BDP (concept design); The Harris Partnership (detailed design); Leach Rhodes Walker (residential)

History
- Opened: 17 March 2024; 2 years ago
Location
- Location within Greater Manchester

Stockport Interchange is a transport hub in Stockport, Greater Manchester, England, combining a bus station, walking and cycling links, a rooftop park and a mixed‑use residential and commercial building. Developed by Stockport Metropolitan Borough Council (SMBC), Transport for Greater Manchester (TfGM) and partner agencies, it was built as part of a redevelopment of the former bus station and opened officially on 17 March 2024.

== History ==
In 2014, funding was awarded through the Greater Manchester Local Growth Deal for the redevelopment of Stockport bus station into a modern transport interchange. A residential apartment block was added to the proposed scheme in 2016.

In October 2018, TfGM and SMBC submitted a planning application for the mixed-use development. Planning permission was granted by Stockport Council on 21 March 2019.

The development partners for the project included Stockport Council, TfGM, the Greater Manchester Combined Authority (GMCA), Homes England and developer CityHeart. BDP was responsible for the concept design of the overall scheme, while The Harris Partnership oversaw the detailed design delivery of the interchange, and Manchester-based architects, Leach Rhodes Walker, led the design of the residential element within the mixed-use building.

Construction began in October 2021, following the demolition of the town's bus station, which was located between Wellington Road (A6) and Stockport Viaduct.

In March 2022, construction work on the interchange was started by the main contractor, Willmott Dixon.

In January 2024, fit-out and decoration of the interchange began, along with the installation of the link between the building and Station Road. Construction of Stockport Interchange was initially scheduled for completion in spring 2024 but, in February, it was announced that passengers would be allowed access from 17 March.

== Facilities ==
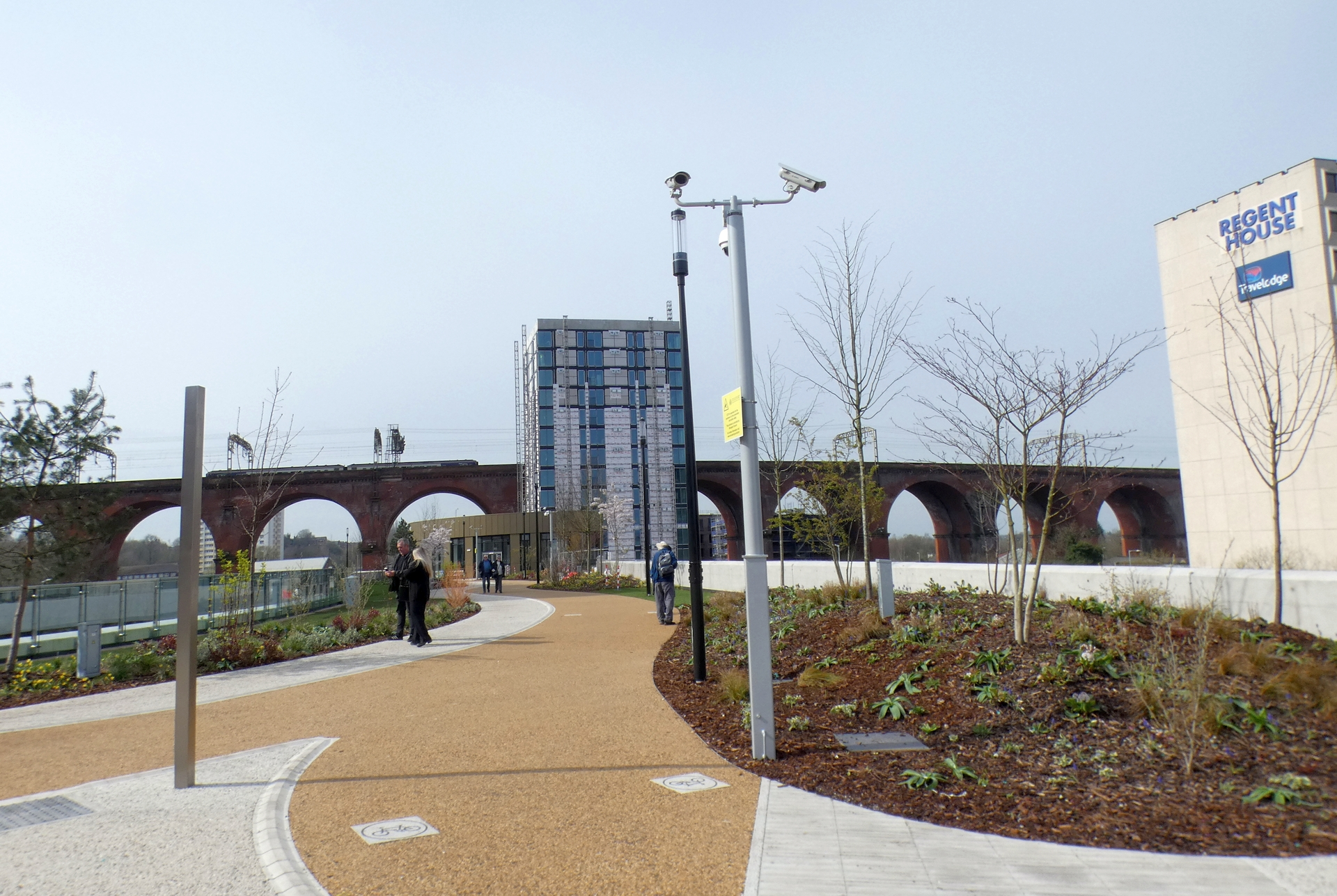
Viaduct Park in 2024

The interchange includes an accessible, covered passenger concourse with seated waiting areas, 18 bus stands with capacity for up to 164 bus departures per hour, bicycle storage facilities and a travel shop.

The development also features a 2-acre (0.81 ha) landscaped rooftop park situated above the bus station. Following a public vote, the park was named Viaduct Park, given its location.

A waterside walking and cycling route, incorporating a spiral ramp, provides access from the river Mersey and the Trans Pennine Trail, to the park and onward to the town centre.

== Mixed-use building ==
The site also includes a 17-storey, 196-unit built-to-rent residential building developed by CityRise Interchange Homes; this is a joint venture between Cityheart and Rise Homes. The building incorporates two basement levels for parking and commercial units at ground level.

== Metrolink connection ==
The design of Stockport Interchange incorporates provisions for a future connection to the Manchester Metrolink network, with dedicated space reserved on-site for a tram stop. In June 2025, it was announced that £2.5 billion in funding had been allocated to extend the Metrolink system, including a proposed link to Stockport.

== Gallery ==
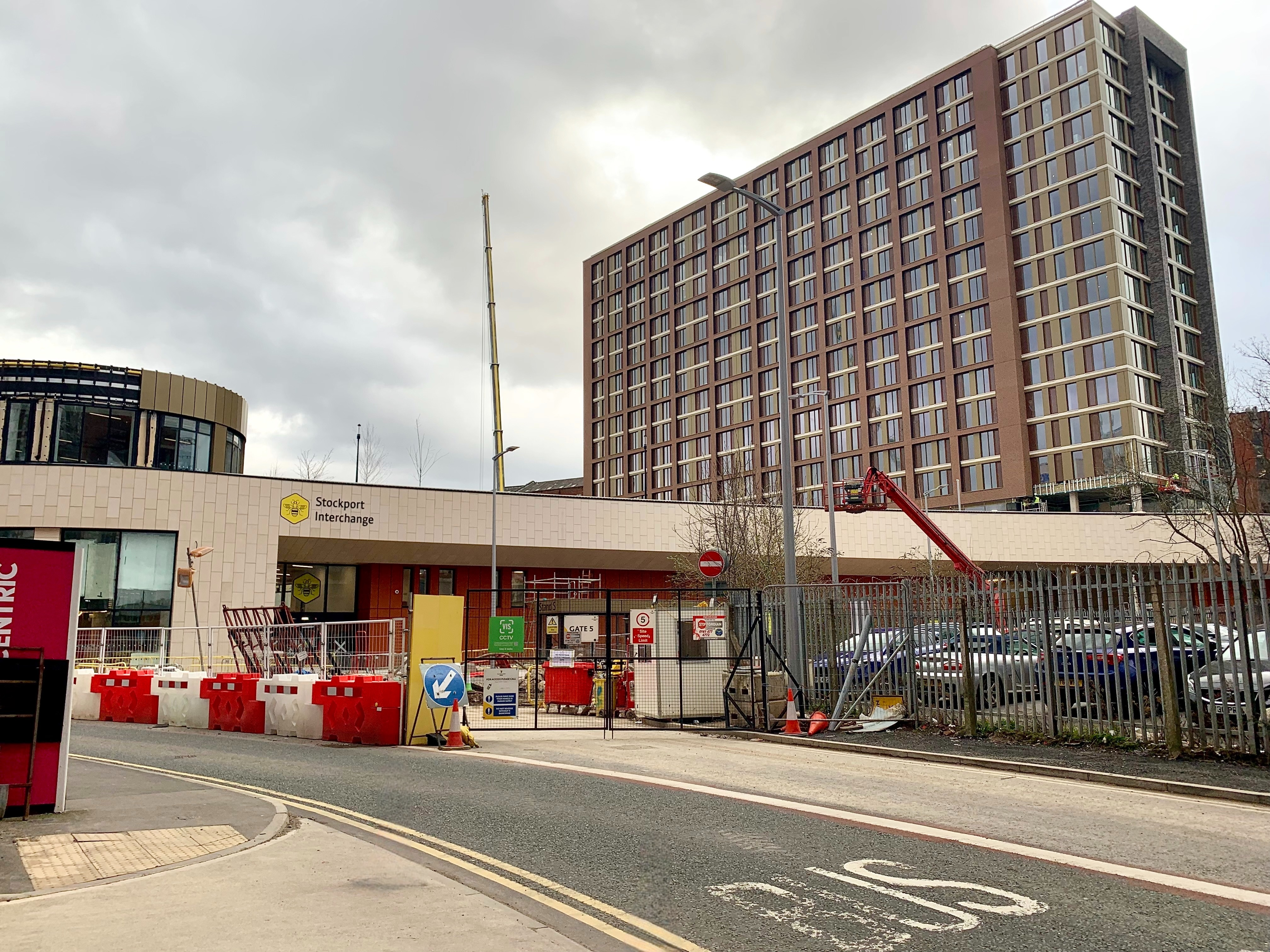
Construction of the interchange approaching completion, February 2024

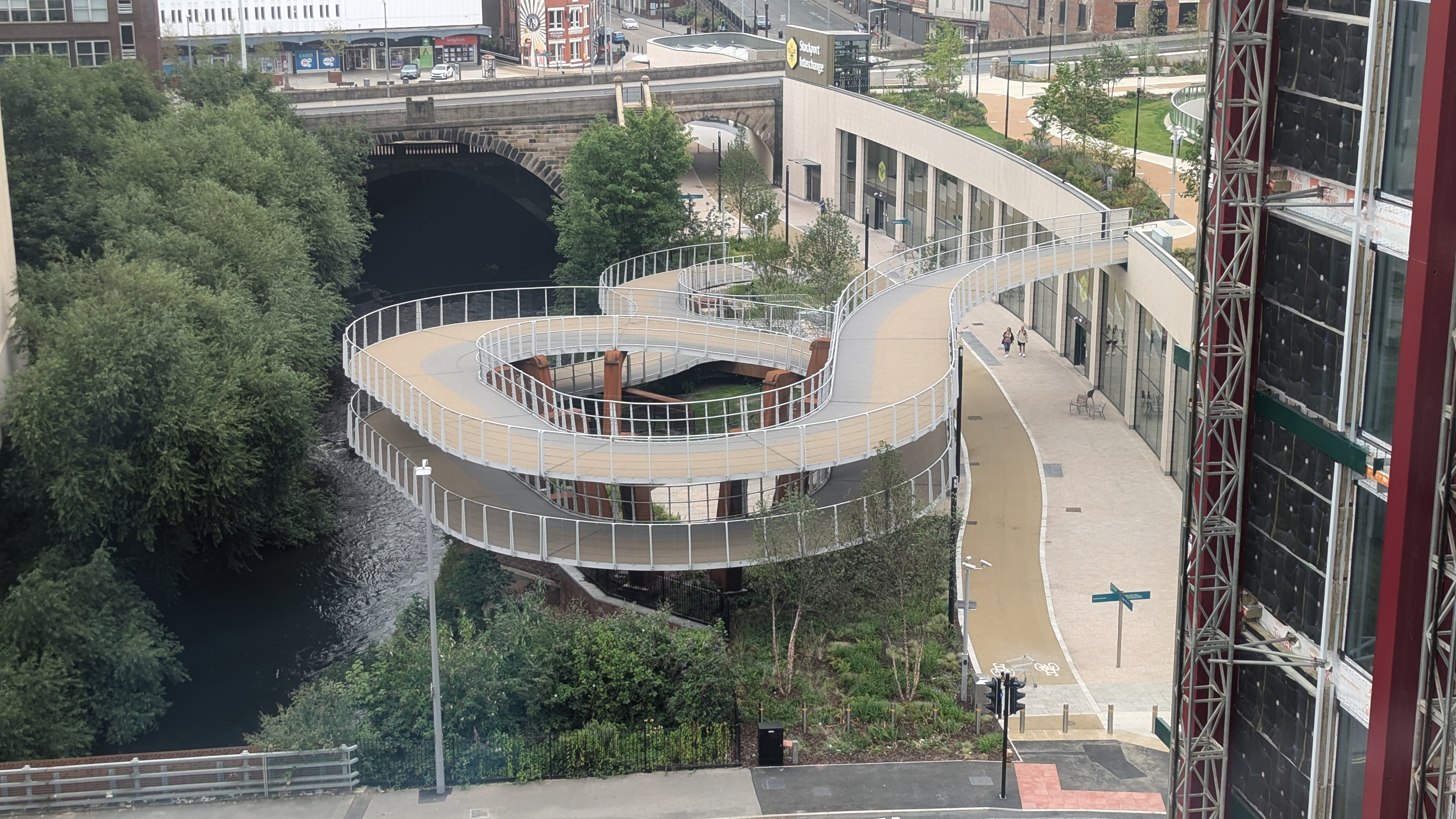
The helix structure on Stockport Interchange, viewed from the nearby railway, 2024

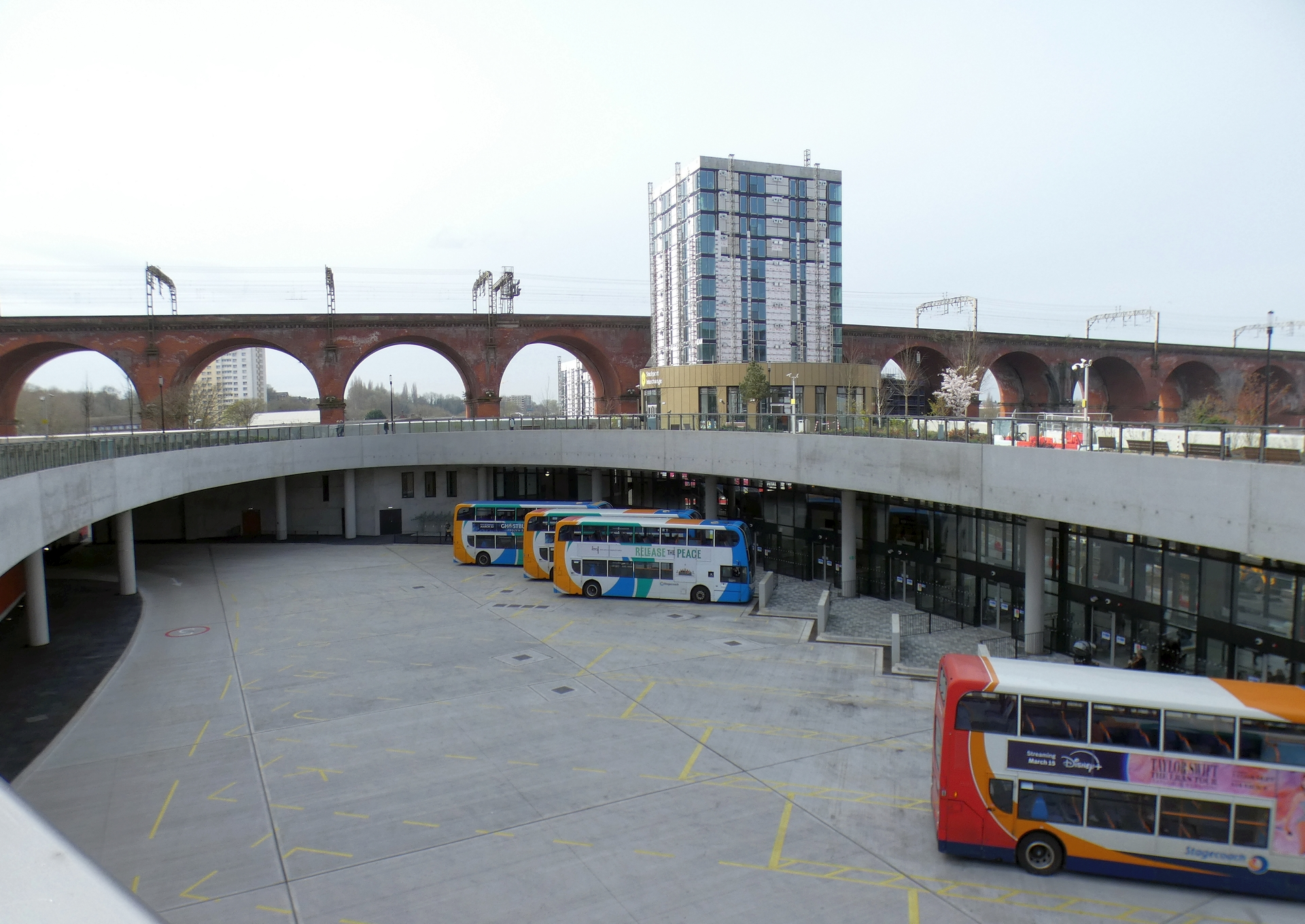
Stockport Interchange and Stockport Viaduct, March 2024

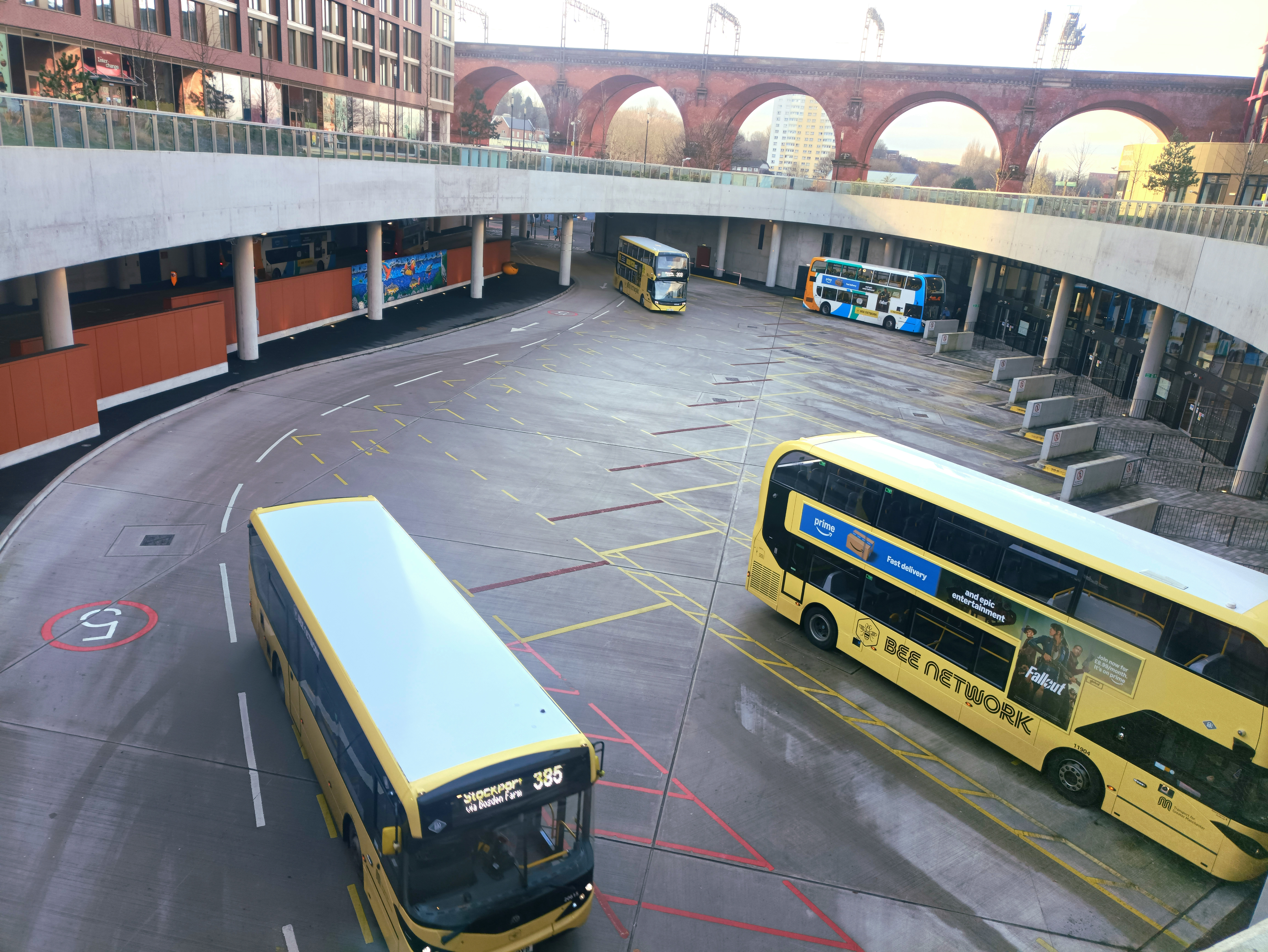
Buses in the interchange, December 2025
