= Volvo B8R =

7.7-litre engined coach and intercity bus chassis manufactured by Volvo

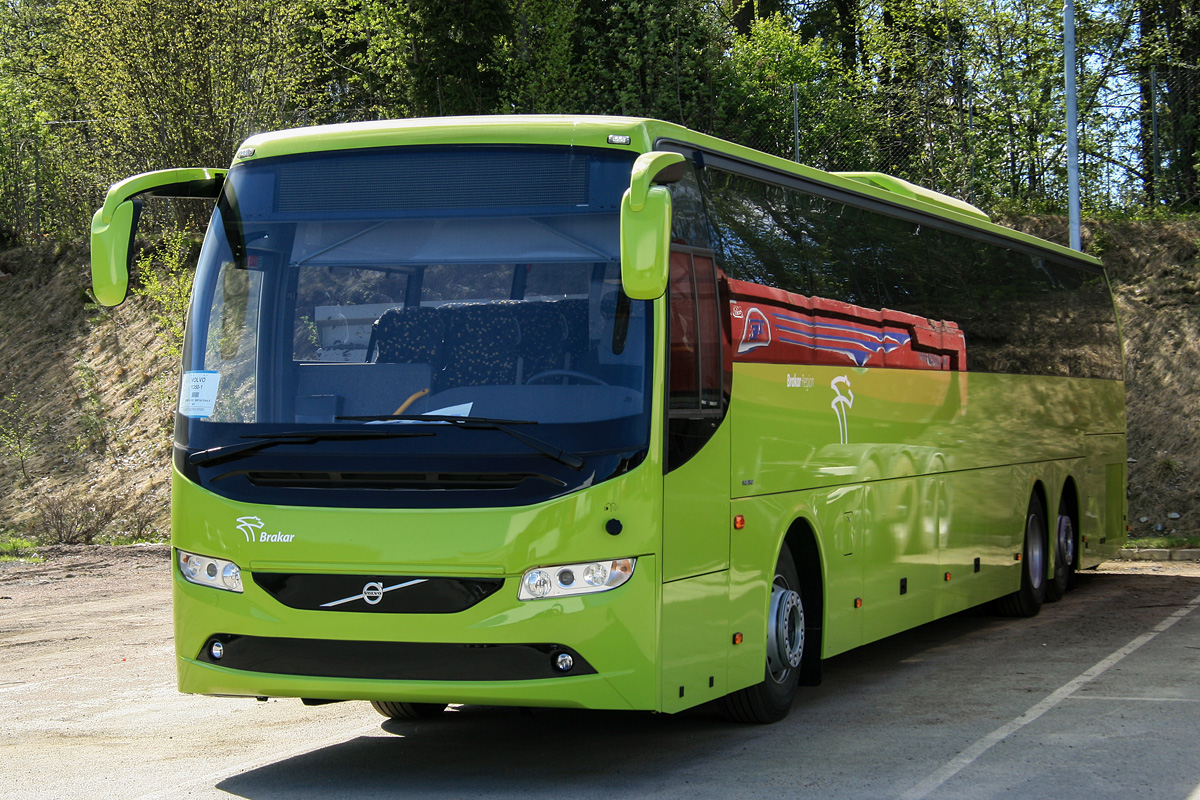
- A Brakar Volvo 9700S UG-bodied B8R 6x2 operated by Nettbuss in Drammen.

Overview
- Manufacturer: Volvo
- Production: 2013–present
- Assembly: Sweden: Borås; Brazil: Curitiba; Philippines (starting from 3Q 2019); Vietnam: Chu Lai (Thaco)

Body and chassis
- Class: Coach and bus chassis
- Floor type: Step entrance

Powertrain
- Engine: Volvo D8K (Euro VI), D8C (Euro III/V)
- Power output: 250-350 bhp
- Transmission: Voith DIWA, ZF EcoLife (automated manual and automatic); 6-speed synchromesh manual

Dimensions
- Length: 10.5-13.6 metres (4x2); 12.2-15.0 metres (6x2)

Chronology
- Predecessor: Volvo B7R; Volvo B9R
- Successor: Volvo BZR

The Volvo B8R is a 7.7-litre engined coach and intercity bus chassis manufactured by Volvo since 2013 for Euro VI markets. It was designed as a replacement for the B7R and the B9R.

In 2017, Euro III and V versions were launched worldwide with engine outputs at 250 and 330 hp. The 250-hp version is marketed in Brazil as the Volvo B250R.

Throughout Europe the B8R is most commonly available as the Volvo 8900, but can also be found in the Volvo 9500 and some versions of Volvo 9700, and from independent bus builders.

It is also available as a low-entry bus chassis, known as Volvo B8RLE.

In the Philippines, Volvo Buses launched the B8R in August 2018. It is the first B8R in the Philippine market to be imported from Borås, Sweden. The locally assembled B8R (for both automatic and manual transmission variants) bus chassis kits in Subic at the Autodelta plant from the third quarter of 2019.

== Powertrain ==
=== Engines ===
D8K, 7698 cc, in-line 6 cyl. turbodiesel (2013–present)

- D8K280 - 206 kW (280 bhp), 1050 Nm, Euro VI
- D8K320 - 235 kW (320 bhp), 1200 Nm, Euro VI
- D8K350 - 258 kW (350 bhp), 1400 Nm, Euro VI

D8C, 7698 cc, in-line 6 cyl. turbodiesel (2017–present)

- D8C250 - 186 kW (250 bhp), 950 Nm, Euro III/Euro V
- D8C330 - 246 kW (330 bhp), 1200 Nm, Euro III/Euro V

=== Transmissions ===
- ZF EcoLife 6AP1200C, 6-speed automatic
- Voith DIWA D854-6, 4-speed automatic
- 6-speed synchromesh manual, with inbuilt hydrodynamic retarder
