= Volvo BZL =

Zero emissions electric bus chassis

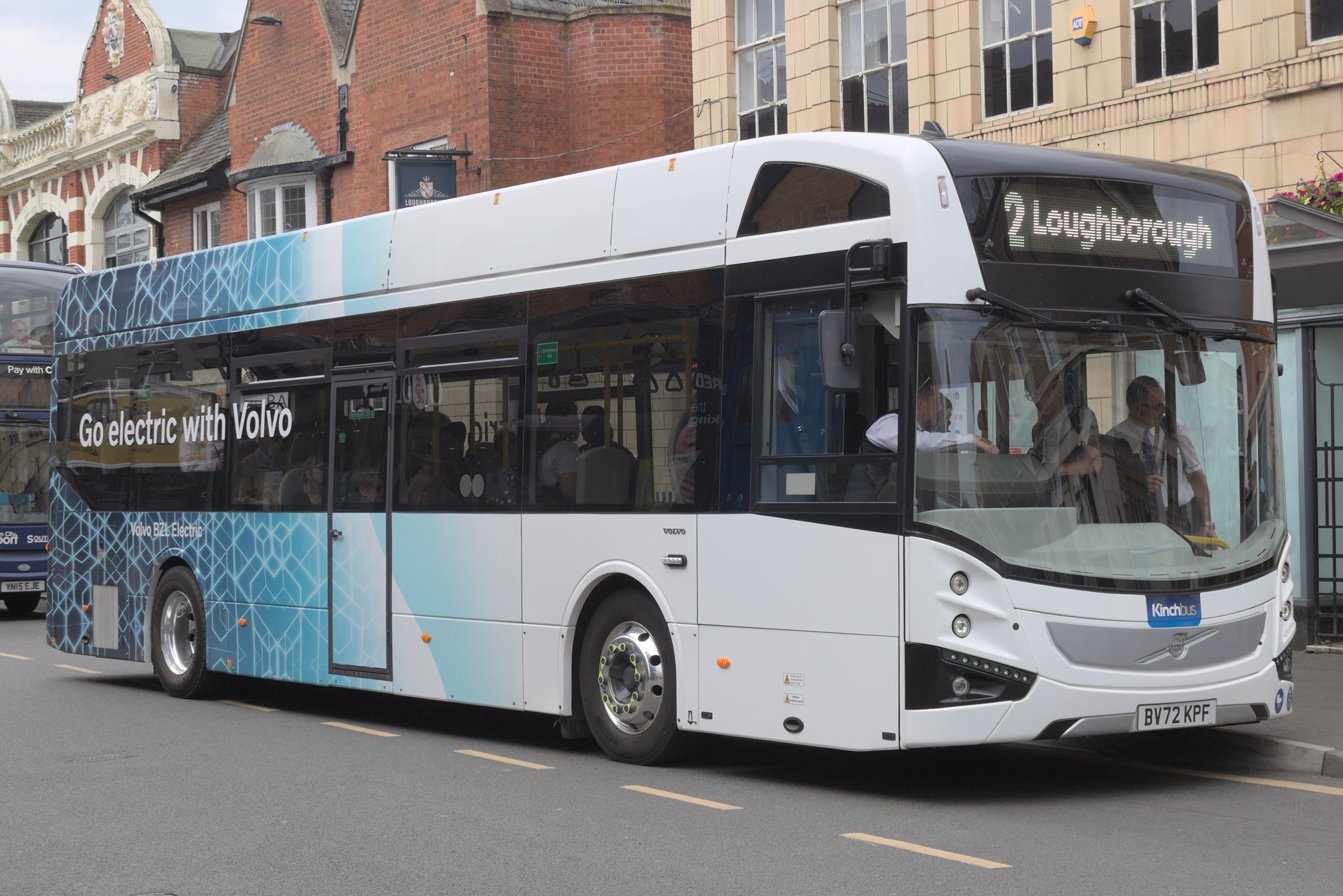
- MCV single-decker bodied Volvo BZL demonstrator in Loughborough, England, June 2025

Overview
- Manufacturer: Volvo Buses
- Production: 2021–present
- Assembly: Borås, Sweden

Body and chassis
- Class: Electric bus
- Doors: 1, 2 or 3
- Floor type: Low floor
- Related: Volvo BZR

Powertrain
- Power output: 400 kW, 31 kNm
- Transmission: Volvo I-Shift 2-speed AMT
- Battery: 282/376/470 kWh 600 V lithium iron phosphate (NCA in Australia)
- Plug-in charging: 300 kW (OppCharge roof charging); 150 kW CCS

Dimensions
- Wheelbase: 3,700 millimetres (150 in)
- Length: Single-decker bus; 9–13 metres (30–43 ft); Double-decker bus; 10.3–10.9 metres (34–36 ft) (2-axle) 12 metres (39 ft) (3-axle); Articulated bus 18 metres (59 ft)
- Width: 2,500 millimetres (8.2 ft)
- Curb weight: 19,500 kilograms (43,000 lb)

Chronology
- Predecessor: Volvo B5LH; Volvo B8RLE

The Volvo BZL is a full-size battery electric bus chassis for both single-deck buses and double-deck buses, manufactured by Volvo Buses since 2021.

== Design ==
First launched in 2021 for the United Kingdom and Ireland markets, featuring both double-decker and single-decker bodies built by MCV Bus & Coach, the BZL chassis range features CO_{2} heat pump-powered heating and ventilation, and is claimed to be 90% recyclable. It is also built to a high safety standard with multiple new safety innovations such as sealed battery compartments and a strengthened front frame.

Volvo later launched the step entrance and low entry BZR bus and coach chassis range in March 2024, featuring variants tailored closer to the Latin American bus market that use similar battery electric technology to both the BZL and its electric Volvo FH trucks. An 18 m (59 ft) articulated single-deck variant with Volgren bodywork was launched in Australia in June 2026, with Alexander Dennis later opening a feasibility study on potentially bodying the chassis for the UK bus rapid transit market, while a 12 m (39 ft) tri-axle variant of the MCV-bodied double-decker BZL was launched in Hong Kong in September 2026.

== Operators ==
=== United Kingdom ===
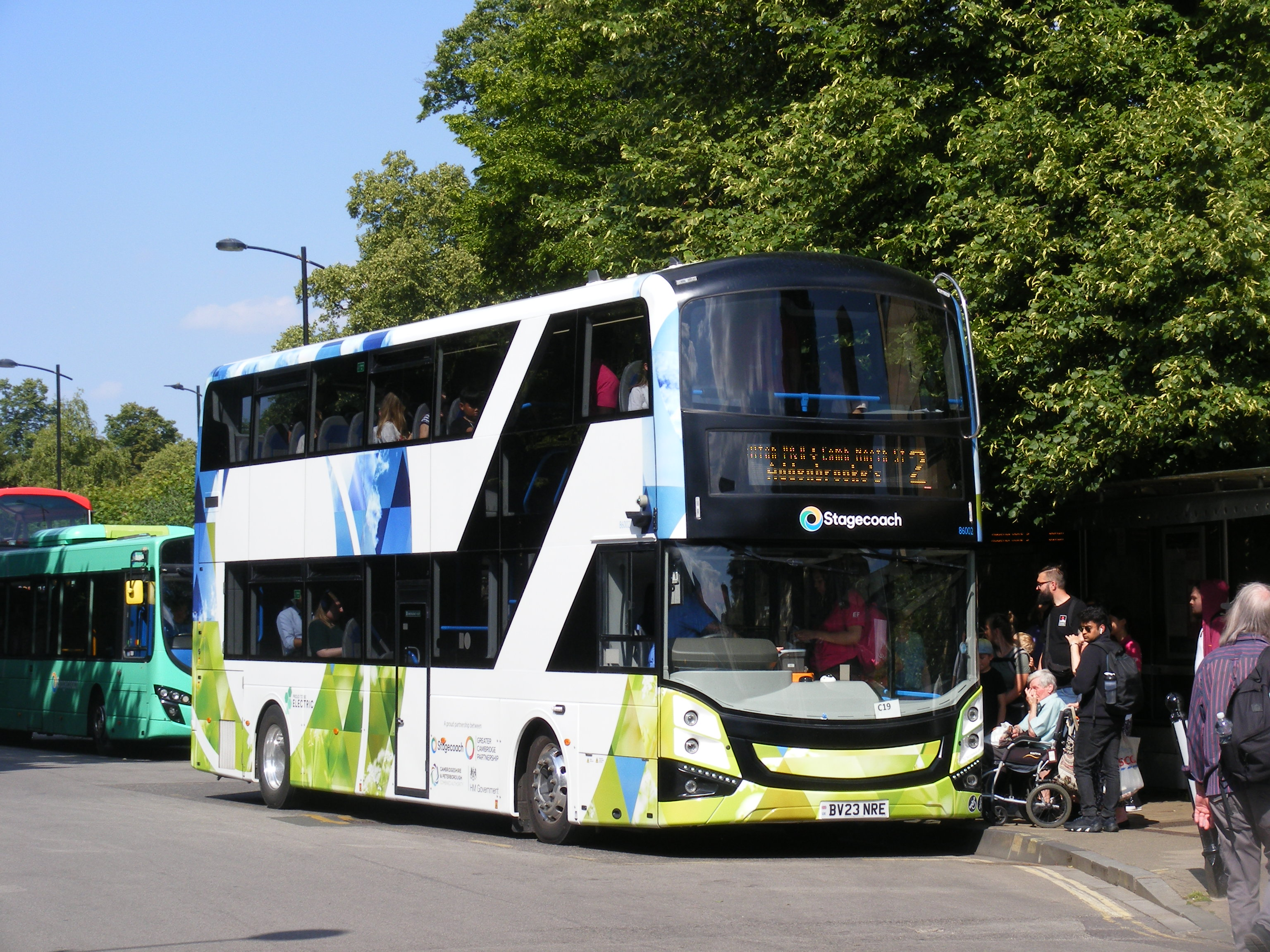
Stagecoach East MCV double decker-bodied Volvo BZL DD in Cambridge in July 2023

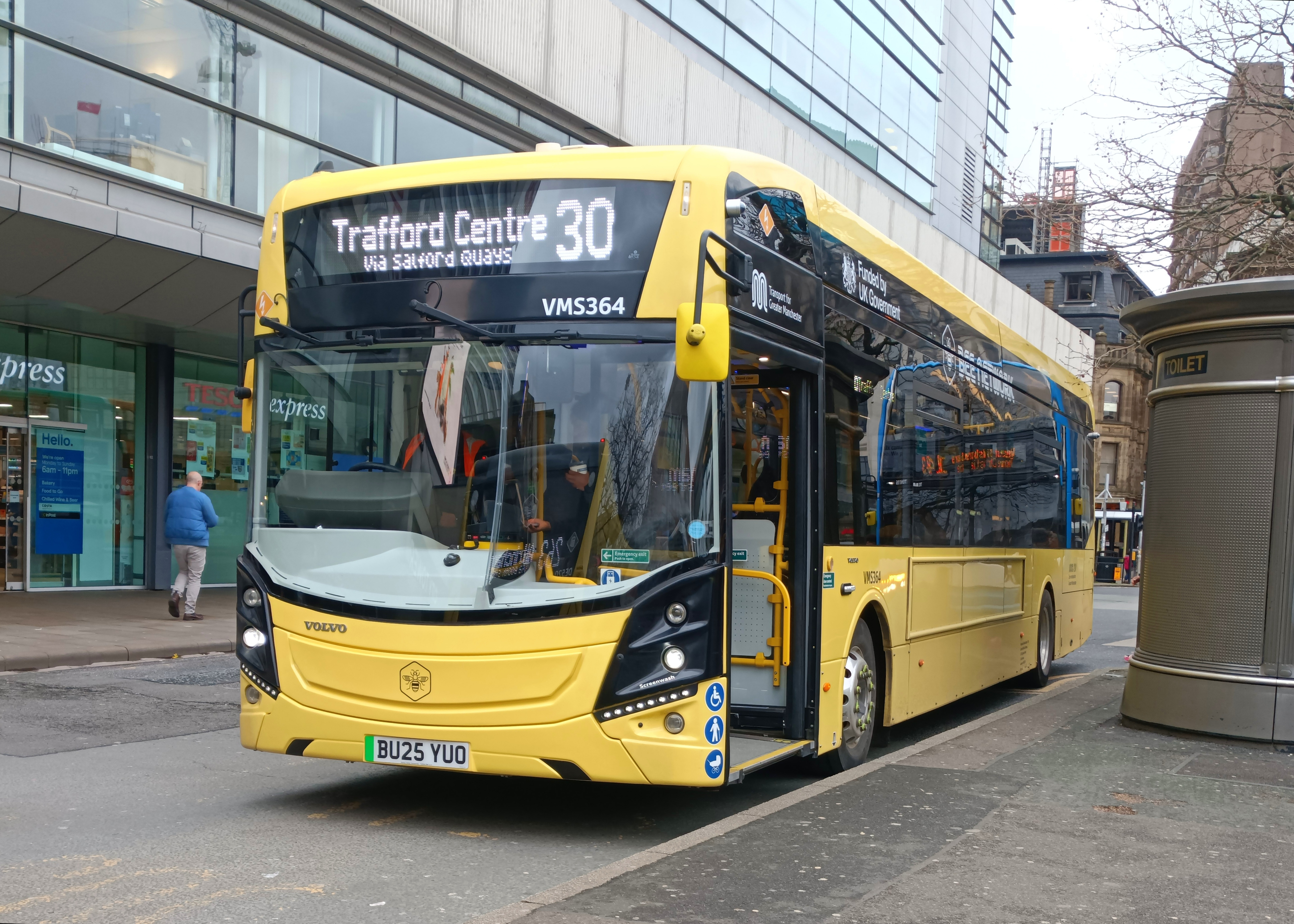
Metroline Manchester MCV single-decker-bodied Volvo BZL at Piccadilly Gardens, February 2026

The first 25 Volvo BZLs for the United Kingdom began to be delivered to Stagecoach West Scotland for use in Ayrshire in February 2023. The first MCV double-deck bodied BZLs followed in May 2023, with 30 entering service with Stagecoach East in Cambridge for use on the city's park and ride system. Six were delivered to Stagecoach East Scotland in September 2025 for use on the JET747 service between Edinburgh Airport and Halbeath, with six more delivered for local services running from Arbroath depot, and further examples to follow for a service between St Andrews and Dundee. Twenty BZLs of undetermined configuration are to be delivered to Stagecoach South West for use in Exeter during 2025, while five BZLs with pantograph chargers were delivered to Stagecoach South East for use on the Dover Fastrack service in February 2026.

In what would have been the largest zero-emissions bus order by the Stagecoach Group to date, Stagecoach Manchester's Stockport depot was to take delivery of 150 double-deck and 20 single-deck BZLs for franchised Bee Network bus services, however severe delays relating to the construction of a new Stockport depot saw the fleet's delivery reallocated to Stagecoach's Middleton and Metroline Manchester's Ashton and Hyde Road depots; a further twelve short wheelbase single-deck BZLs were delivered to Stagecoach's Queens Road depot during 2025 to convert the Manchester city centre free bus network to battery electric operation.

In London, Metroline was the first Transport for London operator to order Volvo BZLs, ordering 48 MCV-bodied single-deck BZLs in November 2022, the first 14 of which entered service on route 251 from January 2024. Metroline are also scheduled to take delivery of a further 28 BZL single-decks for use on routes 228 and 316 during the first quarter of 2024. Stagecoach London followed with an order for 19 single-deck BZLs. Arriva London took delivery of 72 double-deck BZLs for use on routes 41, 243 and 341 during 2026, while Go-Ahead London announced in February 2025 that it is to take delivery of 25 single-deck BZLs.

Elsewhere in the United Kingdom, municipal bus operator Warrington's Own Buses took delivery of 105 single and double-deck BZLs to replace their entire diesel bus fleet, with the first entering service in July 2024, while Lothian Buses took delivery of the first of 50 double-deck BZLs for service in Edinburgh in September 2024.

=== Australia ===
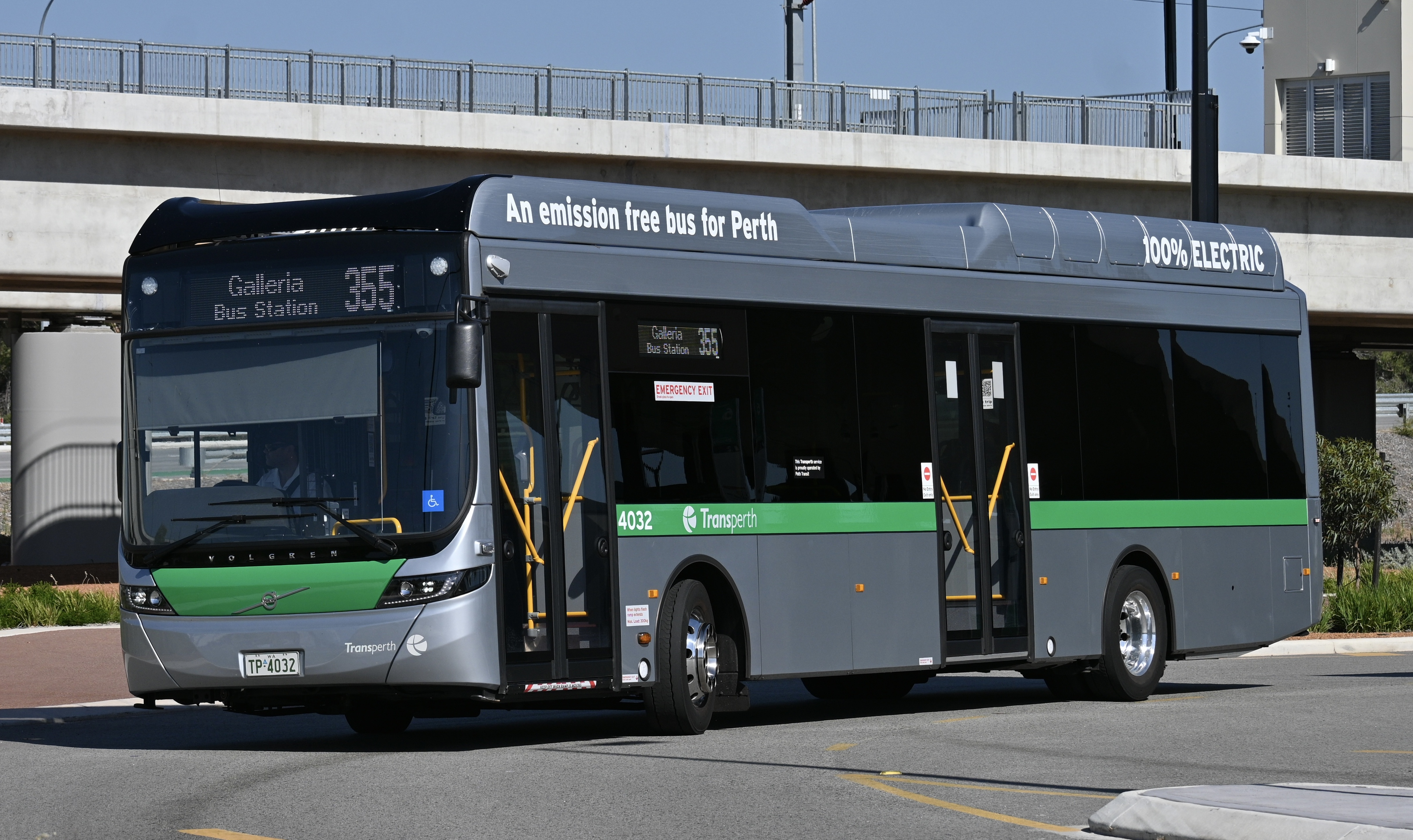
Transperth Volgren bodied Volvo BZL

As of February 2026, over 140 Volvo BZLs with Volgren bodies were in service across Australia. The BZL for the Australia and New Zealand market, bodied exclusively by Volgren, was unveiled in October 2021 at Volvo's Australian headquarters in Brisbane, with the first four BZLs entering service with Transperth on the Joondalup Perth Central Area Transit (CAT) service in February and March 2022. The first of a further 18 for Transperth was delivered in August 2024 for use on a wider range of the CAT services.

In Victoria, CDC Melbourne took delivery of eight BZLs for delivery between 2022 and 2024. Latrobe Valley Bus Lines and Seymour Bus Lines also took delivery of one and three BZLs respectively.

The first of 17 BZLs began to be delivered to Transdev Queensland in February 2023. Hornibrook Bus Lines took delivery of 16 for its new North Lakes depot in late 2023, making it the first bus depot operated entirely by electric buses in Queensland. Transport for Brisbane began operating 2 BZLs in 2023 for the Spring Hill loop service.

In New South Wales, Busways purchased a total of 22 buses with Volgren Optimus bodywork in 2025.

=== Other markets ===
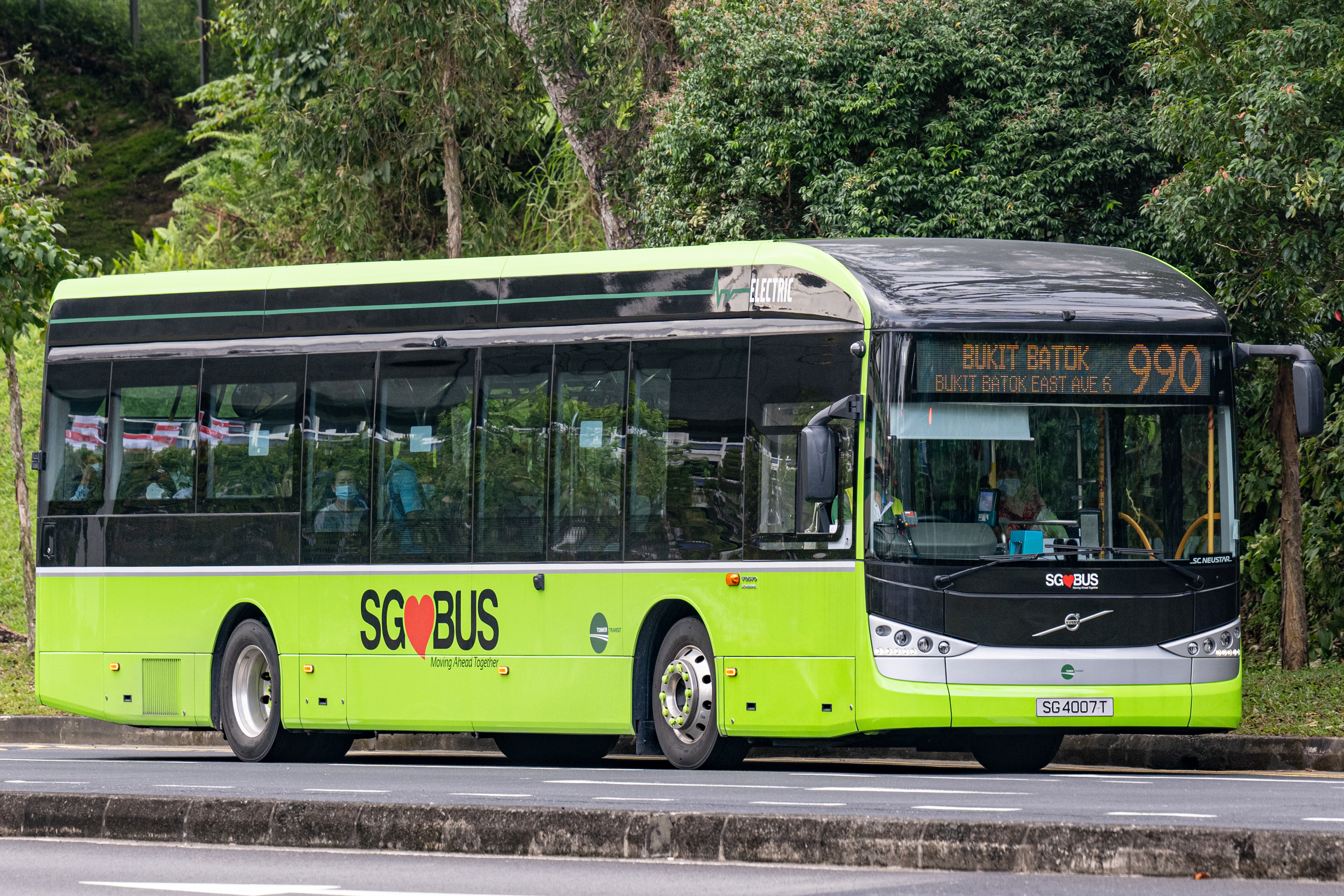
Tower Transit SC Neustar City bodied Volvo BZL in Singapore

In Singapore, a Volvo BZL with a three-door SC Neustar City body was unveiled in November 2022, developed in joint partnership between Volvo and local bus and coach bodywork manufacturer SC Auto. It entered service on a one-year trial with Tower Transit from 26 March 2023, mainly operating on route 282 and 990 until the conclusion of the trial in March 2024.

In Malaysia, the Volvo BZL-GML Eco Range was launched in May 2024 in partnership with local body manufacturer Gemilang Coachworks, with a trial on Rapid Bus free services that commenced later in the year.

In Colombia, a Volvo BZL built with Marcopolo bodywork was unveiled at a tech expo in the capital Bogotá in June 2023 for use on the city's TransMilenio bus rapid transit (BRT) system, the first bus from a European manufacturer to be delivered to the country; this BZL began trial operations in Curitiba in Brazil, with further trials in the cities of São Paulo, Rio de Janeiro and Santiago de Chile to follow.
