= Volvo BZR =

Zero emissions electric bus and coach chassis

Overview
- Manufacturer: Volvo Buses
- Production: 2024–present
- Assembly: Borås, Sweden

Body and chassis
- Class: Electric bus
- Doors: 1, 2 or 3
- Floor type: Step entrance Low entry
- Related: Volvo BZL

Powertrain
- Power output: 200-400 kW
- Transmission: Volvo I-Shift 2-speed AMT
- Battery: Up to 540 kWh 600V lithium iron phosphate
- Plug-in charging: 450 kW (OppCharge roof charging); 250 kW CCS

Dimensions
- Wheelbase: 4.0 metres (13.1 ft)
- Length: BZR CD; 13.3–14.9 metres (44–49 ft); Medium Floor; 9.5–14.9 metres (31–49 ft); Low Entry; 9.8–14.8 metres (32–49 ft)
- Width: 2.5 metres (8.2 ft)
- Kerb weight: 20,800–27,200 kilograms (45,900–60,000 lb)

Chronology
- Predecessor: Volvo B8R; Volvo B8RLE

The Volvo BZR (also known as BZRLE for low-entry model) is a full-size step entrance and low entry battery electric bus chassis manufactured by Volvo since 2024.

== Design ==
The BZR range was launched in March 2024 as a development of the Volvo BZL low-floor city bus chassis. Offered in two and three-axle configurations, the BZR chassis range is marketed for use on both bus rapid transit services requiring high passenger-carrying capacity, as well as intercity bus and coach services. The chassis range uses the same 200 kW motor used in both the BZL and 7900e buses, with an option for an additional motor to be added to extend power output to 400 kW, and it also uses the same 600V lithium iron phosphate used in electric models of the Volvo FH truck.

Production of the BZR is set to commence in 2025, with the first body confirmed to be offered on the chassis being a dual or tri-axle Volvo 8900 manufactured by MCV Bus and Coach, capable of carrying up to 110 passengers. A variant with a tri-axle body produced by Carrus Delta Oy named the BZR CD, available at lengths of 13.3 m (44 ft), 14.0 m (45.9 ft), or 14.9 m (49 ft) and capable of a 720 kWh battery range through accommodating eight 90 kWh batteries as opposed to six, was also launched in September 2025.

Articulated versions of the BZR and BZRLE are also in development, as well as a bi-articulated variant of a step-entrance BZR chassis for use in bus rapid transit systems in Latin America to succeed the already discontinued B12MA/B340M chassis. A coach variant of the medium floor BZR, capable of a range of up to 700 kilometres (430 mi) on one charge and available as a dual or tri-axle chassis at lengths of 9.5 to 14.9 metres (31 to 49 ft), was launched by Volvo for the European market in September 2025.

== Operators ==
The first operator of the BZR CD coach will be Swedish commuter coach company Vy Flygbussarna, where they will be operated on services between the city of Gothenburg and Landvetter Airport from spring 2026.

The first customer for the bus variant of the BZR was the City of Cape Town, South Africa, who will take delivery of 30 BZRLEs with bodies manufactured by the Gauteng Bus and Coach Centre for its MyCiTi bus rapid transit network between August 2026 and June 2027.
