= Stockport bus station =

Former bus station in Greater Manchester, England

Stockport
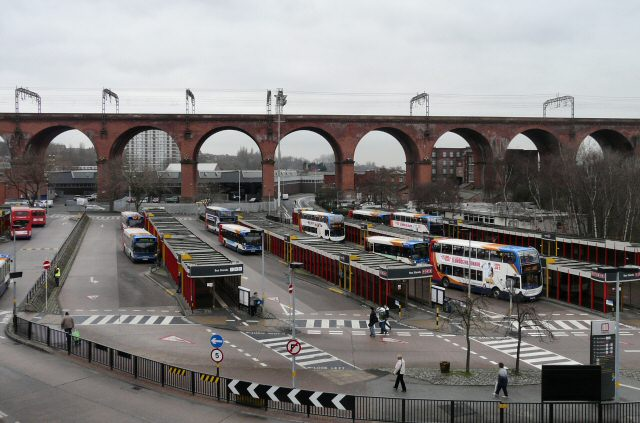
- The former bus station, with the viaduct in the background, 2009

General information
- Location: Chestergate, Stockport, Metropolitan Borough of Stockport, England
- Coordinates: 53.40867°N 2.16361°W
- Owner: Transport for Greater Manchester (TfGM)
- Operator: TfGM
- Bus routes: 7A 7B 11 11A 23 23A 25 42 191 192 197 199 203 313 314 322 323 324 325 327 328 330 358 360 364 368 374 375 378 378A 379 382 383 384 391 392 X5 X92 (Note: As at 28 August 2021, the last full day of operation.) (Note: Stagecoach Manchester-operated routes in blue; other operators in black.)
- Bus stands: 24 (A-AB, excluding I and O)
- Bus operators: Stagecoach Manchester; High Peak Buses; Little Gem; Selwyns Travel; Stotts Tours
- Connections: Stockport railway station

History
- Opened: 2 March 1981
- Closed: 29 August 2021
Location

Stockport bus station served the large town of Stockport, in Greater Manchester, England. It was opened on 2 March 1981 on the site of a former car park; most routes had terminated previously at Mersey Square. It was closed in 2021, when it was a terminus for around 65 routes, and the site now houses the new Stockport Interchange.

== History ==
The bus station was located between Wellington Road (A6) and Stockport Viaduct, a few hundred metres from Stockport railway station. The main bus station had 24 stands; two additional stops, one for each direction, were located on Wellington Road, which runs between the bus station and Mersey Square; these were used by through services, including the high-frequency 192 route between Manchester Piccadilly Gardens, Stepping Hill Hospital and Hazel Grove.

In 2014, plans to demolish the bus station and build a new a £42 million transport interchange on the existing site, with a connection to the railway station, were announced; these plans were not carried out at the time.

In June 2018, new plans were announced for a brand-new bus station that would be constructed on the same site, underneath a 2-acre (0.81 ha) park. Other improved transport links were also planned, including a bridge to the railway station.

On 29 August 2021 at 3:15am, all stands at Stockport bus station (excluding the two Wellington Road stops) were closed after 40 years of continuous operation. These were replaced temporarily by a small bus terminal off Heaton Lane, as well as several bus stops spread out around the town centre. The new Stockport Interchange facility was planned to be completed in 2024; it opened on 17 March that year.

== Services ==
As at August 2021, the majority of routes were operated by Stagecoach Manchester, with High Peak Buses, Little Gem, Selwyns Travel and Stotts Tours also using the station.

Most routes served the South Manchester area; services connected Stockport with Manchester Piccadilly Gardens, Altrincham, Ashton-under-Lyne, Didsbury, Hyde, Levenshulme, Longsight, Manchester Airport and Wythenshawe.

Services also connected all main areas in the borough including Bramhall, Bredbury, Brinnington, Cheadle, Cheadle Hulme, Edgeley, Gatley, Hazel Grove, the Four Heatons, Marple, Offerton, Reddish, Romiley and Stepping Hill Hospital.

Locations served further afield include Bolton, Buxton, Chorlton, Hayfield, Macclesfield, Poynton, Stretford, Sale and the Trafford Centre.

A full list of services that operated in 2021 is shown below:

Route	From	To	via
7A	Stockport	Ashton-under-Lyne	Gorton and Reddish
7B	Stockport	Ashton-under-Lyne	Droylsden and Reddish
11	Altrincham	Stockport	Baguley, Wythenshawe Hospital, Wythenshawe and Cheadle
11A	Altrincham	Stockport	Timperley, Baguley, Gatley and Cheadle
23/23A	Stockport	Trafford Centre	Didsbury, Chorlton, Stretford and Urmston
25	Stockport	Trafford Centre	Burnage, Chorlton and Stretford
42	Stockport	Manchester city centre	Didsbury, Withington and Manchester Royal Infirmary
191	Manchester city centre	Hazel Grove	Longsight, Levenshulme, Stockport and Stepping Hill Hospital
192	Stockport	Piccadilly Gardens	Heaton Chapel, Levenshulme, Longsight and Ardwick
197	Stockport	Manchester city centre	Green End, Levenshulme and Longsight
199	Buxton	Manchester Airport	Stockport
203	Stockport	Manchester city centre	Reddish and Belle Vue
313	Stockport	Manchester Airport	Adswood and Cheadle Hulme
314	Stockport	Offerton	Offerton Fold
322	Stockport	Haughton Green	Portwood, Brinnington and Denton
323	Stockport	Heaton Mersey	
324	Stockport	Haughton Green	Portwood, Brinnington and Denton
325	Stockport	Brinnington Circular	Brinnington
327	Stockport	Denton	Brinnington and Portwood
328	Adswood	Edgeley	
330	Ashton-under-Lyne	Stockport	Dukinfield and Hyde
358	Stockport	Hayfield	Offerton, Marple and New Mills
360	Stockport	Hayfield	Hazel Grove, Disley and New Mills
364	Stockport	Heaton Moor	Woodbank Park and Bosden Farm
368	Stockport	Wythenshawe Hospital	Adswood, Heald Green and Wythenshawe
374	Stockport	Hazel Grove	
375	Stockport	Mellor	Marple, Offerton and Stepping Hill Hospital
378	Stockport	Cheadle Hulme	
378A	Stockport	Grove Lane	Cheadle Hulme
379	Stockport	Heald Green	Cheadle Hulme
382	Stockport	Woodley	Bredbury and Romiley
383/384	Stockport	Stockport	Offerton, Marple, Romiley, Harrytown and Bredbury (383 anticlockwise, 384 clockwise)
391/392	Stockport	Macclesfield	Poynton, Pott Shrigley and Bollington
X5	Stockport	Sale	
X92	Manchester city centre	Hazel Grove	Stockport
