= Bee Card (Manchester) =

Electronic ticketing scheme

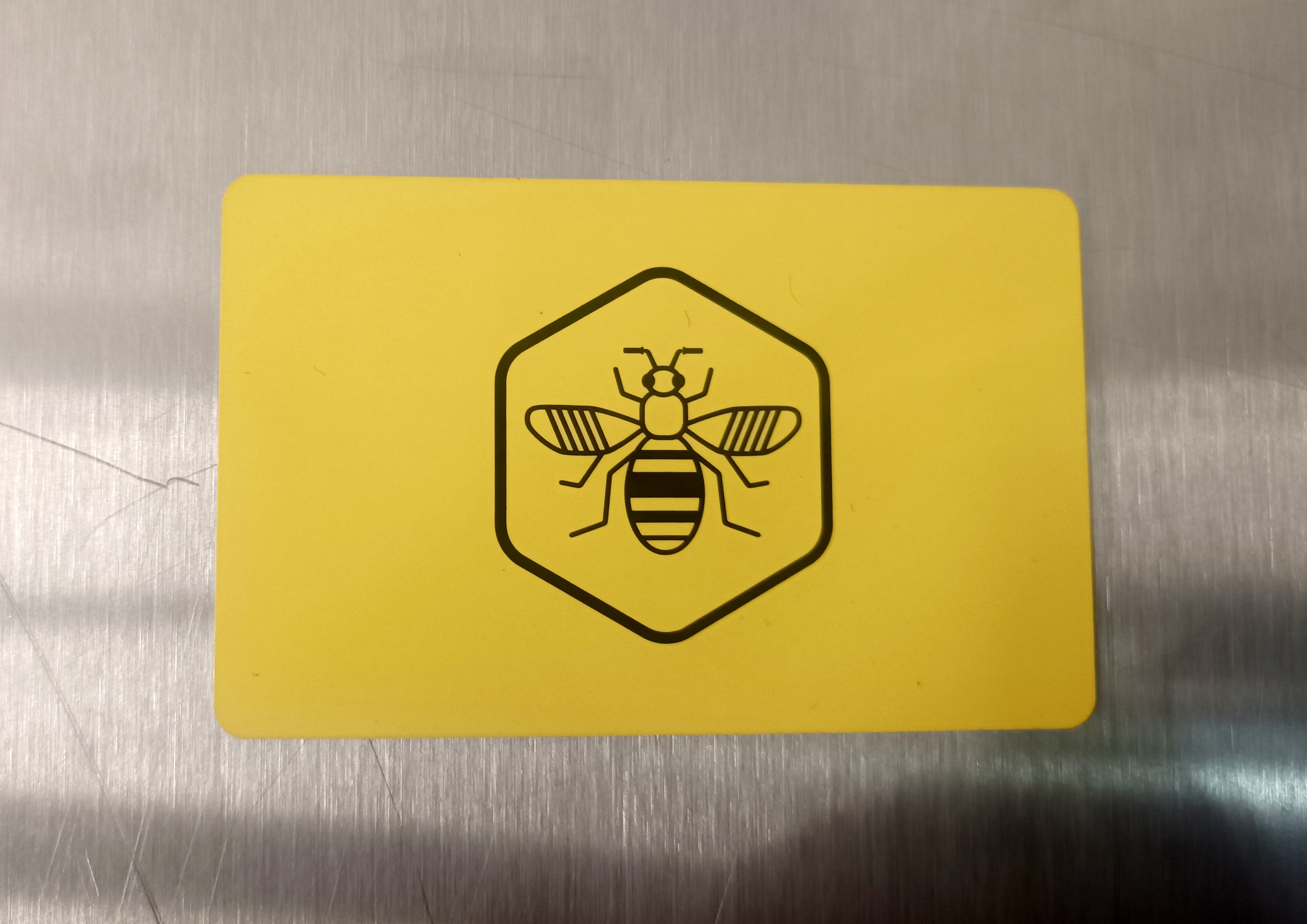
- Location: Greater Manchester
- Technology: ITSO Smartcard
- Manager: Transport for Greater Manchester
- Website: tfgm.com/tickets-and-passes/ways-to-pay/smart-card

Bee Card is an electronic ticketing scheme under development by Transport for Greater Manchester (TfGM) for use on public transport services in Greater Manchester, England. It was first announced and confirmed in June 2012 as get me there as an integrated travel card, comparable to London's Oyster card, for Greater Manchester. following a bid from the Greater Manchester Combined Authority.

== History ==
In February 2008, the Greater Manchester Passenger Transport Executive announced plans to trial the use of Bolton Council leisure Smart Cards for journeys on some Arriva Manchester bus services. In 2012, TfGM announced that a broader integrated smartcard system would be developed across trains, trams and buses.

== Use ==
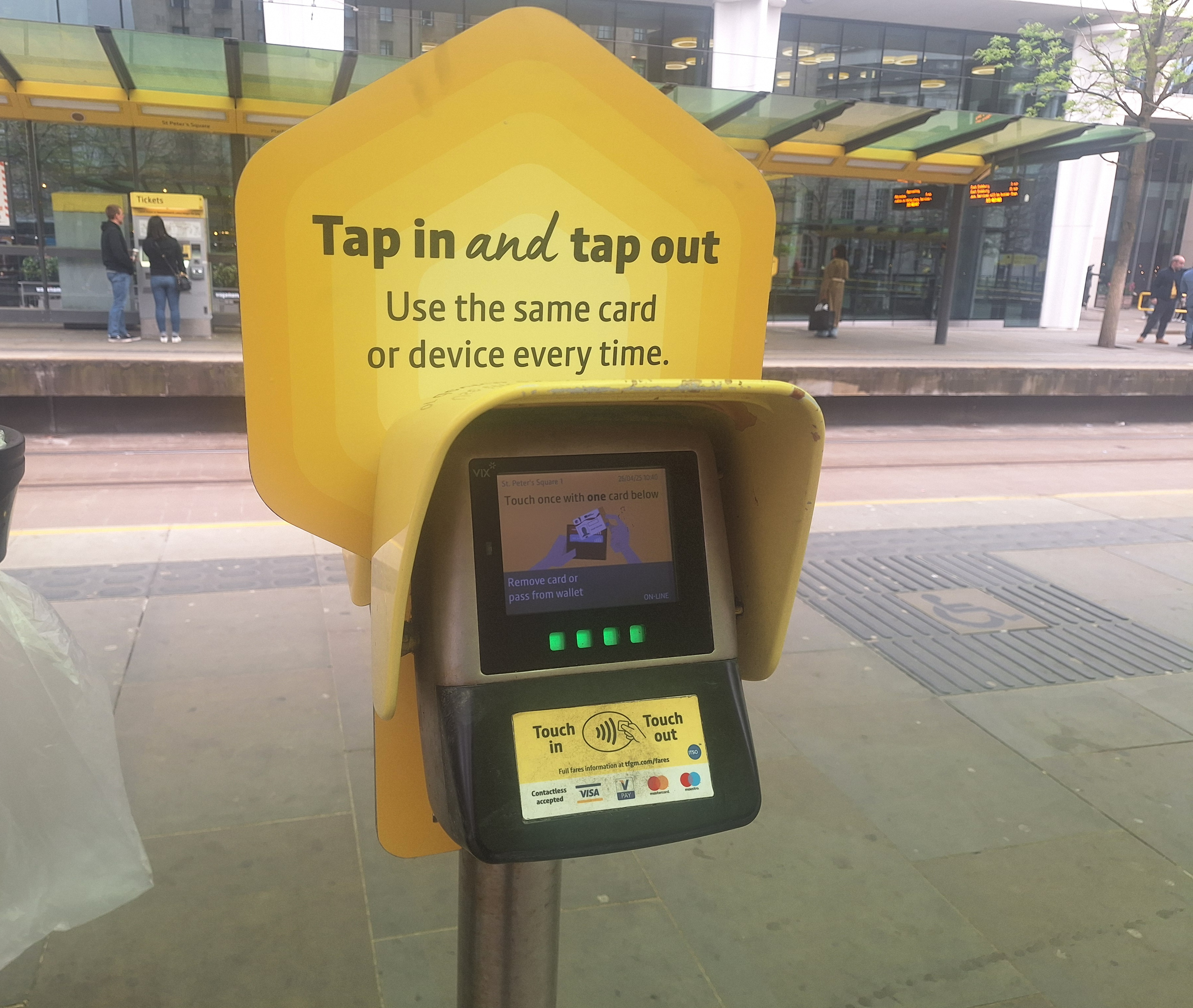
A Bee Card validator at a Metrolink tram stop

People in Greater Manchester with existing concessionary travel passes were invited to test the scheme. Now, all concessionary pass holders may use their Bee Cards when traveling using Metrolink. Season ticket holders were the first to be offered their own 'My Get Me There' card, and now others can sign up for a card. Customers can still use contactless credit or debit cards for simple journeys on Get Me There. However, they will not be able to store season tickets or use the automatic cheapest fare functionality that is available to smart card users.

The name "get me there" was revealed on 17 June 2013, with the scheme's dedicated travel card named "my get me there".

== Timescale ==
GMT was planned to be introduced on Metrolink services in 2014, Greater Manchester bus services in 2015, and was hoped to be introduced on National Rail services across Greater Manchester in 2017, when the new Northern rail franchise was confirmed. However, the scheme's introduction on Metrolink stalled after the first stage, as it became clear that Atos, who were contracted to deliver and operate the scheme, would not be able to manage the rollout on to trams. The contract was cancelled in August 2015, with significant contractual payments made to TfGM. Plans for introducing mobile phone-based ticketing on trams before the end of the year were announced in September 2015 along with continuing rollout of the GMT card on buses via System One, the Northern and TransPennine Express rail franchises remain contractually obliged to roll out smart card use on trains as part of their franchise requirements and the northern PTEs as Rail North are doing preparatory work on a region wide smartcard. In 2023, get me there officially rebranded to "Bee Card" after the rollout of Bee Network, offering the same services under a new name with a new website interface.

== Reception ==
The GMT system was criticised in the press as confusing and less flexible than London's Oyster card. Particular points of criticism include the requirement to buy Metrolink tickets for specific times, a long delay between purchasing a ticket online and the ticket becoming usable, and a lack of clarity regarding the distinction between the smartcard and the accompanying app, which are two independent systems.
