= Metroline Manchester =

Bus operator in Greater Manchester, England

- Bee Network branded Wright StreetDeck Electroliner at Piccadilly Gardens in November 2026
- Parent: ComfortDelGro
- Founded: 12 April 2024; 2 years ago
- Commenced operation: 5 January 2025
- Headquarters: Hyde Road, Manchester
- Service area: Greater Manchester; Derbyshire
- Service type: Bee Network bus services
- Routes: 232
- Destinations: Manchester, Oldham, Airport, Didsbury, Ashton-under-Lyne, Logistics North, Altrincham, Sale, Stretford, Glossop, Wythenshawe, Stockport, Hattersley, Hyde, Ardwick, Trafford Centre, Etihad Stadium, Trafford Park, Eccles, Old Trafford, Woodley, Walkden, Reddish, Gorton, Chorlton-cum-Hardy
- Depots: 4
- Fleet: 420
- Fuel type: Diesel, hybrid and electric
- Chief executive: Patrick Sibley
- Website: metroline.co.uk/manchester/

Metroline Manchester is a bus operator in Greater Manchester, England. It is a subsidiary of ComfortDelGro, operating franchised Bee Network bus services under contract to Transport for Greater Manchester (TfGM).

== History ==
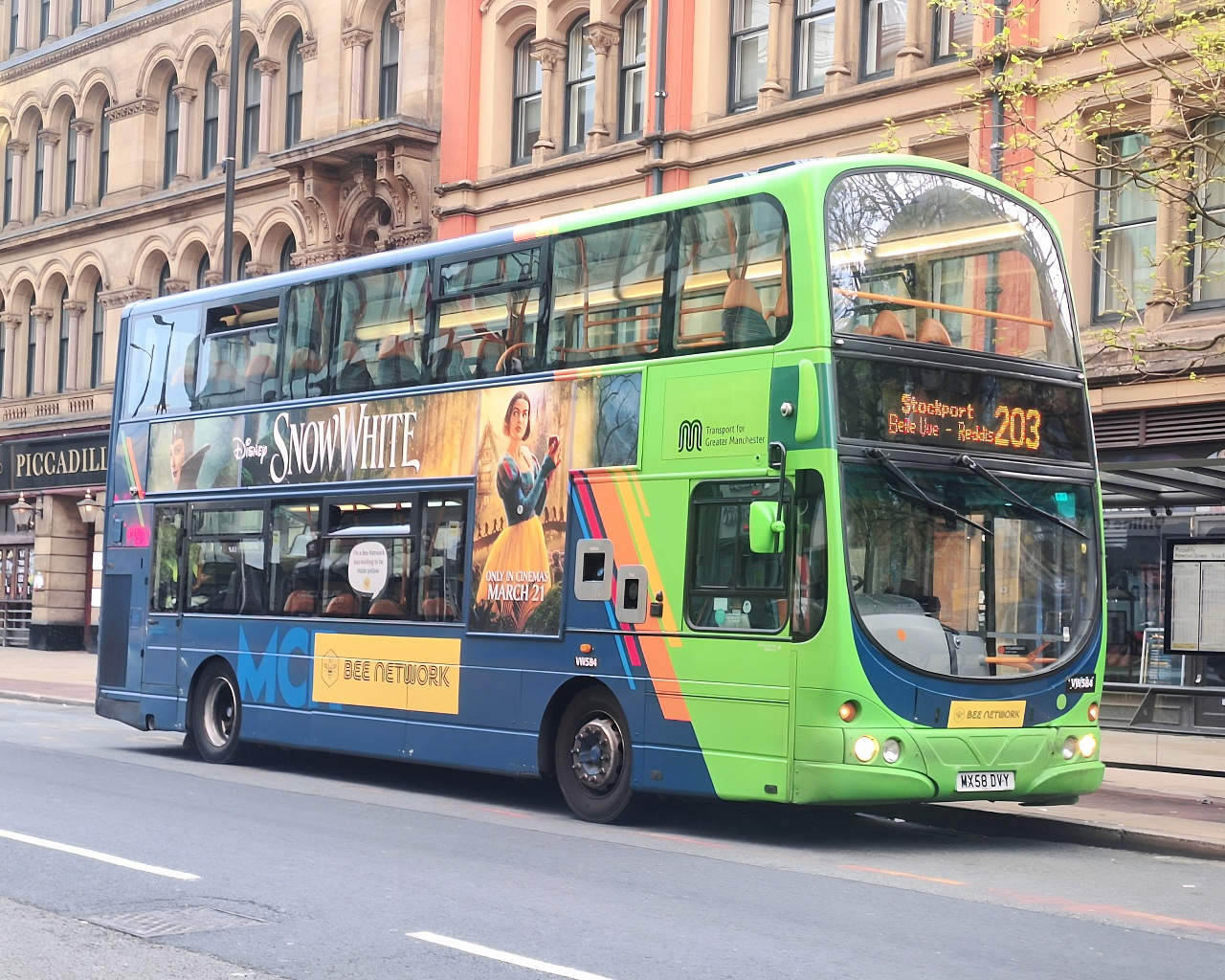
Wright Eclipse Gemini bodied Volvo B9TL acquired from Stagecoach Manchester at Piccadilly Gardens bus station in April 2025

ComfortDelGro, through its London based Metroline subsidiary, took an early interest in Transport for Greater Manchester's franchised Bee Network bus services, recruiting former Arriva Yorkshire regional manager Patrick Sibley in September 2022 to help in its bidding for Tranches 2 and 3 of franchises. With no pre-existing presence in Greater Manchester, the operator aimed to secure large franchise contracts from TfGM so it would inherit depot facilities from existing operators; winning smaller contracts would have resulted in Metroline having to establish new depot facilities within the region.

Initially, Metroline was unsuccessful in bidding for Tranches 1 and 2 of Bee Network contracts, which went to existing operators in the area. In March 2024, however, it was announced that Metroline had won four of five Tranche 3 contracts, taking on bus services in the south side of the City of Manchester operated from Ashton, Hyde Road, Sharston and Wythenshawe depots for a five year period, with options to extend the contract for a further two years. Metroline Manchester commenced operations on Bee Network services on 5 January 2025, with Patrick Sibley taking on the position of Managing Director for the new operator.

== Depots ==
Metroline Manchester operates buses from four depots across Greater Manchester, with a total of 1,350 driving staff required. A majority of staff from existing operators were able to transfer employment to Metroline Manchester through a TUPE transfer.

=== Ashton ===
Ashton bus depot was taken over from Stagecoach Manchester to operate services in Tameside. Located in an industrial estate off Clarence Street, the depot was established by Stagecoach in 2008 to replace a former Mayne Coaches bus depot located on Ashton New Road. It is the first bus depot in Greater Manchester to receive a fully electric fleet.

=== Hyde Road ===
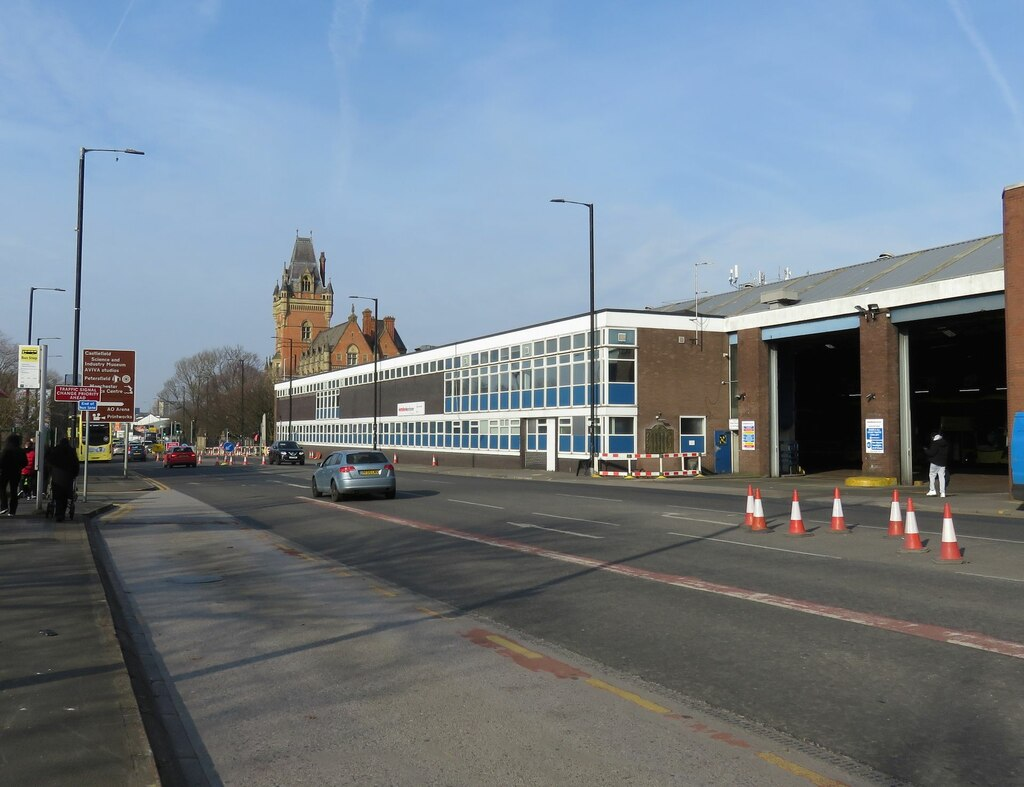
Hyde Road bus depot in February 2025

Hyde Road bus depot is the head office and largest depot of Metroline Manchester following the commencement of operations, having been taken over from Stagecoach Manchester. The depot was originally opened by Manchester Corporation Tramways in 1902, being considerably redeveloped during the 1920s ahead of the running of trolleybuses and motorbuses from the late 1930s respectively. Hyde Road was redeveloped again during the 1960s, with parts of the old tram sheds demolished and a new entrance and frontage being constructed along Hyde Road itself.

=== Sharston ===
Sharston bus depot was taken over from Stagecoach Manchester, with a fleet of 32 BYD Alexander Dennis Enviro400EVs coming with this depot. This depot is located within the Sharston Industrial Estate, capable of holding over 200 buses and equipped with rainwater recycling systems and motion-activated lighting to minimise environmental impact, and was opened by Stagecoach in 2010 to replace the former GM Buses Princess Road depot in Moss Side.

=== Wythenshawe ===
Wythenshawe depot was taken over from Arriva North West, with no vehicles coming with this transfer. Located on the Southmoor Industrial Estate, it is planned for Metroline to operate this depot using solely single decker diesel-powered vehicles. Prior to the commencement of franchised services, Metroline used this depot to operate a fleet of Wright Eclipse Gemini 2 bodied Volvo B9TLs on driver training duties.

== Fleet ==
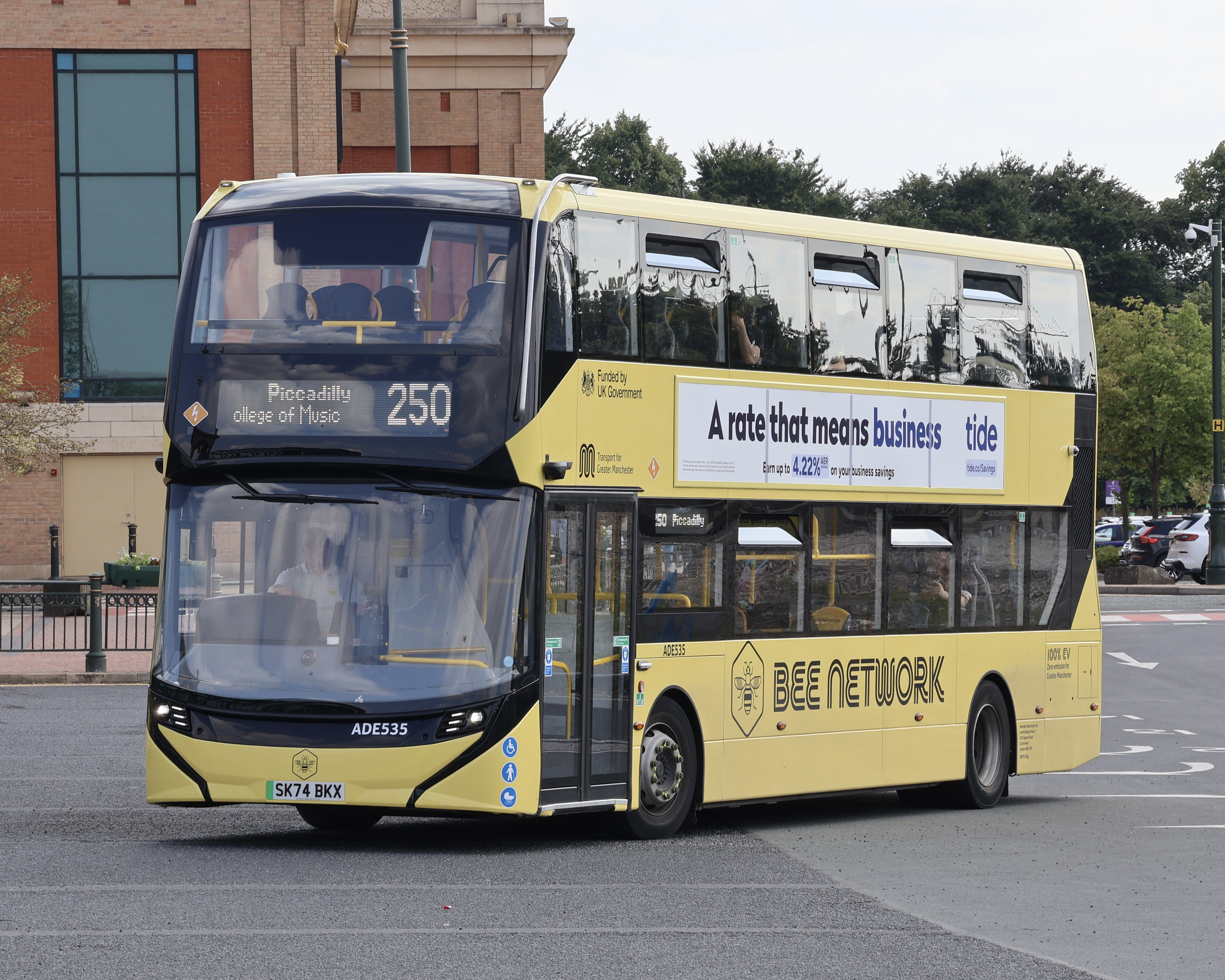
Bee Network branded Alexander Dennis Enviro400EV at The Trafford Centre in June 2025

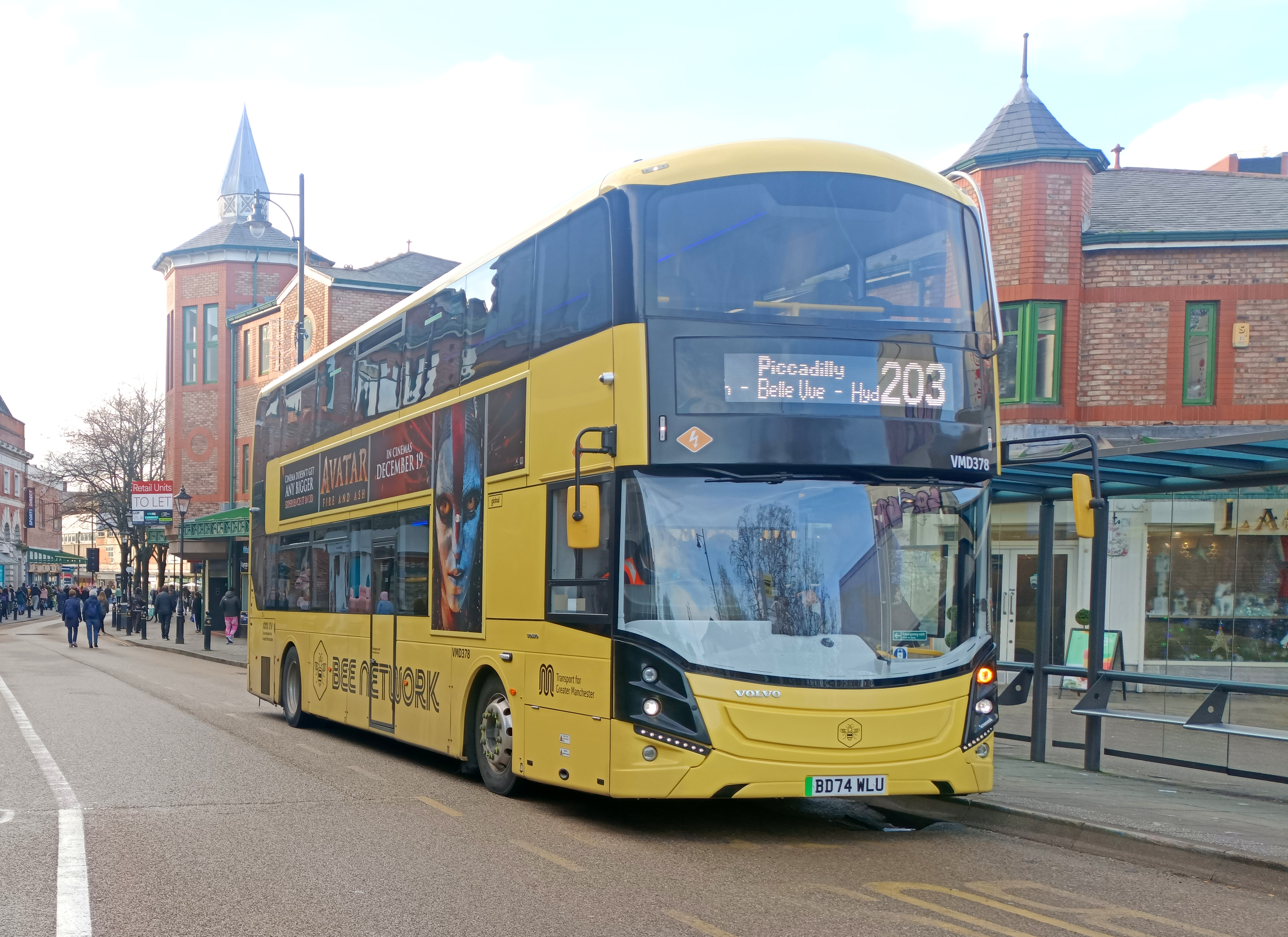
MCV D113 bodied Volvo BZL battery-electric bus in Stockport Town Centre in December 2025

As of June 2025, Metroline Manchester operates a fleet of 477 buses. The company's operating licence was provisionally approved to allow a fleet of over 500 buses to be potentially operated by the company.

Metroline Manchester operates a mixture of diesel, hybrid electric and battery electric buses, with new deliveries primarily including 110 MCV bodied Volvo BZLs, 135 Wright StreetDeck Ultroliners, 24 Alexander Dennis Enviro400EVs and 50 Alexander Dennis Enviro200 MMCs. A fleet of 100 Wright StreetDeck Electroliners are due for delivery to Hyde Road depot during 2026.

Up to 125 buses, including 32 BYD Alexander Dennis Enviro400EVs based at Sharston and 52 Wright Eclipse Gemini bodied Volvo B9TLs based at Queens Road, were inherited from Stagecoach Manchester in January 2025 via the TfGM fleet Residual Value Mechanism. Metroline Manchester also inherited a fleet of Alexander Dennis Enviro400Hs from Stagecoach Manchester and Stagecoach Yorkshire, including most of the existing Magic Bus fleet, while a fleet of Alexander Dennis Enviro400 MMC bodied Volvo B5LHs were also purchased secondhand from Stagecoach East Scotland.
