= Transport for Greater Manchester =

Public transport organisation in Greater Manchester, England

- Map showing Greater Manchester, the executive's area of responsibility
- Abbreviation: TfGM
- Predecessor: Greater Manchester Passenger Transport Executive (GMPTE)
- Formation: 1 April 2011; 15 years ago
- Type: Public body
- Headquarters: Piccadilly Place, Manchester
- Region served: Greater Manchester (Note: A small number of bus routes extend into Cheshire, Derbyshire and West Yorkshire.)
- Commissioner: Vernon Everitt
- Managing Director: Steve Warrener
- Parent organisation: Greater Manchester Combined Authority (GMCA)
- Budget: £330.6 million
- Website: www.tfgm.com

Transport for Greater Manchester (TfGM) is a local government body responsible for co-ordinating transport services throughout Greater Manchester, in North West England. It is an executive arm of the Greater Manchester Combined Authority (GMCA), the city region's administrative authority. The strategies and policies of Transport for Greater Manchester are set by the GMCA and its Greater Manchester Transport Committee (GMTC). The committee is made up of 33 councillors appointed from the ten Greater Manchester boroughs (Bolton, Bury, Manchester, Oldham, Rochdale, Salford, Stockport, Tameside, Trafford and Wigan), as well as the Mayor of Greater Manchester.

TfGM owns Metrolink, which is a light rail/tram system; it is operated and maintained under contract by KeolisAmey. TfGM also owns Greater Manchester's cycle hire scheme, and is responsible for cycling and walking infrastructure. TfGM owns and maintains bus stations, stops and shelters; however, bus services are deregulated in Great Britain outside London. Following the passing of the Bus Services Act 2017, Greater Manchester became the first city-region to start the process of bus franchising, returning bus services to public control.

TfGM is responsible for developing the Bee Network, an integrated transport network for Greater Manchester. It is rolling out a single transport livery, integrated fares & ticketing, and a fare cap across tram, bus, cycling, walking and eventually suburban rail. In January 2025, all Metrolink trams and franchised buses services were integrated, along with cycle hiring services.

Negotiations with central government have led to the agreement that eight commuter lines across Greater Manchester and North Derbyshire will be progressively transferred to TfGM control of fare and service specification between December 2026 and December 2028, with the introduction of multi-modal fare caps with tram and bus, tap and go ticketing, and 64 railway stations refurbished and branded Bee Network. The remaining 32 stations across Greater Manchester lying on other rail lines will then follow by 2030.

== History ==
The organisation traces its origins to the Transport Act 1968, when SELNEC (South East Lancashire/North East Cheshire) Passenger Transport Executive was established to co-ordinate public transport in and around the area that is now Greater Manchester. (Note: The county of Greater Manchester was created in 1974, formed of areas in and around Manchester that were previously part of Cheshire and Lancashire.) Between 1974 and 2011, it was known as GMPTE (Greater Manchester Passenger Transport Executive), until a reform of local government in Greater Manchester granted it more powers and prompted a corporate rebranding. On 1 April 2011, GMPTE became Transport for Greater Manchester (TfGM), a new regional transport body for Greater Manchester that forms part of the GMCA.

== Governance ==
TfGM inherited the responsibilities of GMPTE, which was established in 1974. At the same time, GMITA was abolished, with responsibility for oversight of the executive transferred to the combined authority.

The combined authority and the ten Greater Manchester districts have delegated or referred most of their transport governance functions to a joint committee, the Bee Network Committee. Each local authority appoints one of its executive members with responsibility for transport matters to sit alongside the mayor, a member of the GMCA, and up to four other councillors appointed by the mayor. These additional mayoral appointees allow the committee's political make-up to reflect the political make-up of Greater Manchester's councils as a whole.

The Bee Network Committee has four key responsibilities:

- Decision-making over significant operational matters across the transport network, including the ability to draw down funding for investment
- Monitoring the performance and financial stability of the network
- Developing policy to support the local transport plan
- Facilitating coordination between the ten local authorities around highways maintenance and infrastructure delivery.

== Services ==
A map of railway and tram services in Greater Manchester

=== Manchester Metrolink ===
The Metrolink light rail/tram system, launched in 1992, is entirely subsidised by TfGM without a government grant and is operated by KeolisAmey. It carried 43.7 million passengers in the 2018/19 financial year. It has 99 tram stops, with further expansion of the network to Stockport and Bolton envisaged.

- Altrincham – Piccadilly (extends to Etihad Campus Monday–Saturday evenings and all day Sunday)
- Altrincham – Bury (operates Monday–Saturday daytimes)
- Ashton-under-Lyne – Eccles (via MediaCityUK outside Monday–Saturday daytimes)
- Bury – Piccadilly
- East Didsbury – Rochdale Town Centre
- East Didsbury – Shaw and Crompton (operates Monday–Saturday daytimes)
- Etihad Campus – MediaCityUK (operates Monday–Saturday daytimes)
- Manchester Airport – Victoria
- The Trafford Centre – Crumpsall.

=== Heavy rail ===
National Rail services in the county are operated by the following six train operating companies:

- Avanti West Coast
- CrossCountry
- East Midlands Railway
- Northern Trains
- TransPennine Express
- Transport for Wales.

TfGM subsidises fares on certain local services and funds station refurbishments on an ad-hoc basis. Many local railway journeys can be paid for with TfGM's Bee Card.

=== Buses ===
Bus services are run predominantly by the following large operators, under contract to the Bee Network:

- Diamond Bus North West
- First Greater Manchester
- Go North West
- Metroline Manchester
- Stagecoach Manchester.

Private operators include:

- Arriva North West
- Belle Vue Coaches
- Blackburn Bus Company
- Burnley Bus Company
- First West Yorkshire
- High Peak Buses
- Stagecoach Merseyside and South Lancashire.

Other bus services include:

- Free Bus – launched in 2002 as Metroshuttle. It provides two free bus routes around Manchester city centre. New services were provided in Bolton, Oldham and Stockport after success of the service in Manchester, but those services were substantially withdrawn by 2019.
- Ring & Ride – an accessible, low-cost minibus service for people who have difficulty in using public transport.
- Local Link – an on-demand minibus service for areas of Greater Manchester with limited public transport. Areas include Dane Bank, East Manchester, Heald Green, Heywood, Middleton, Saddleworth and Mossley, South Manchester, Timperley and Sale West, and Wythenshawe.

=== Highways and cycling ===
- Greater Manchester Urban Traffic Control Unit (GMUTC) had responsibility for road management; it was transferred to TfGM in 2009. This entails installation, maintenance and management of traffic signals, limited areas of road safety (2012), incident response and event management, via a traffic control centre.
- Cycling – promotion of the Greater Manchester Cycling Strategy, and delivery of cycle hubs and regional cycle routes.

=== Fares, ticketing and information ===
TfGM is responsible for operation of the following:

- Bee Card
- Bee Any Bus travelcards
- Public transport maps and timetables
- Route Explorer application
- Subsidised fares on certain services
- Website.
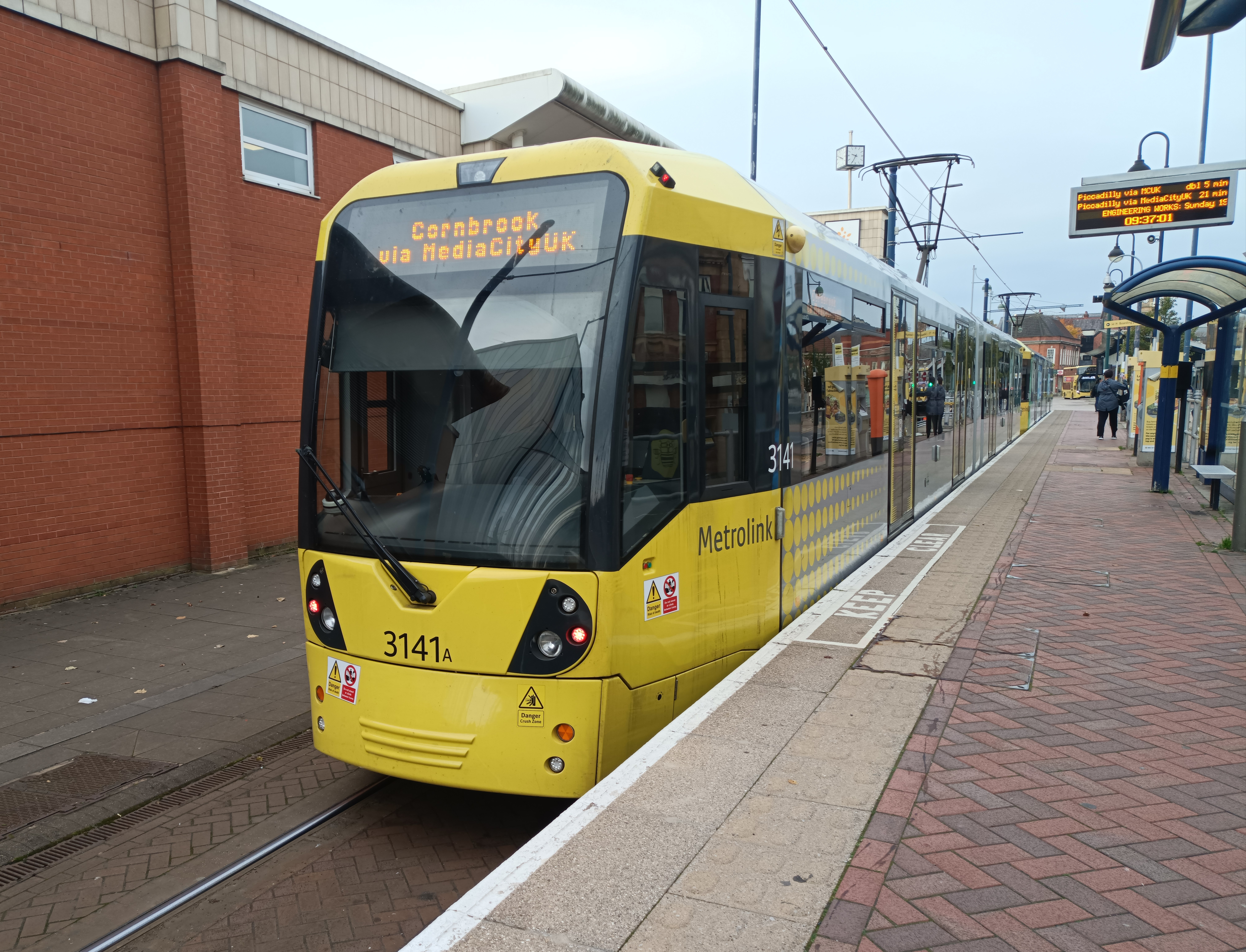
Metrolink
TfGM owns Greater Manchester's light rail/tram system, which includes over 64 miles of track and 99 stops across seven of its ten boroughs.

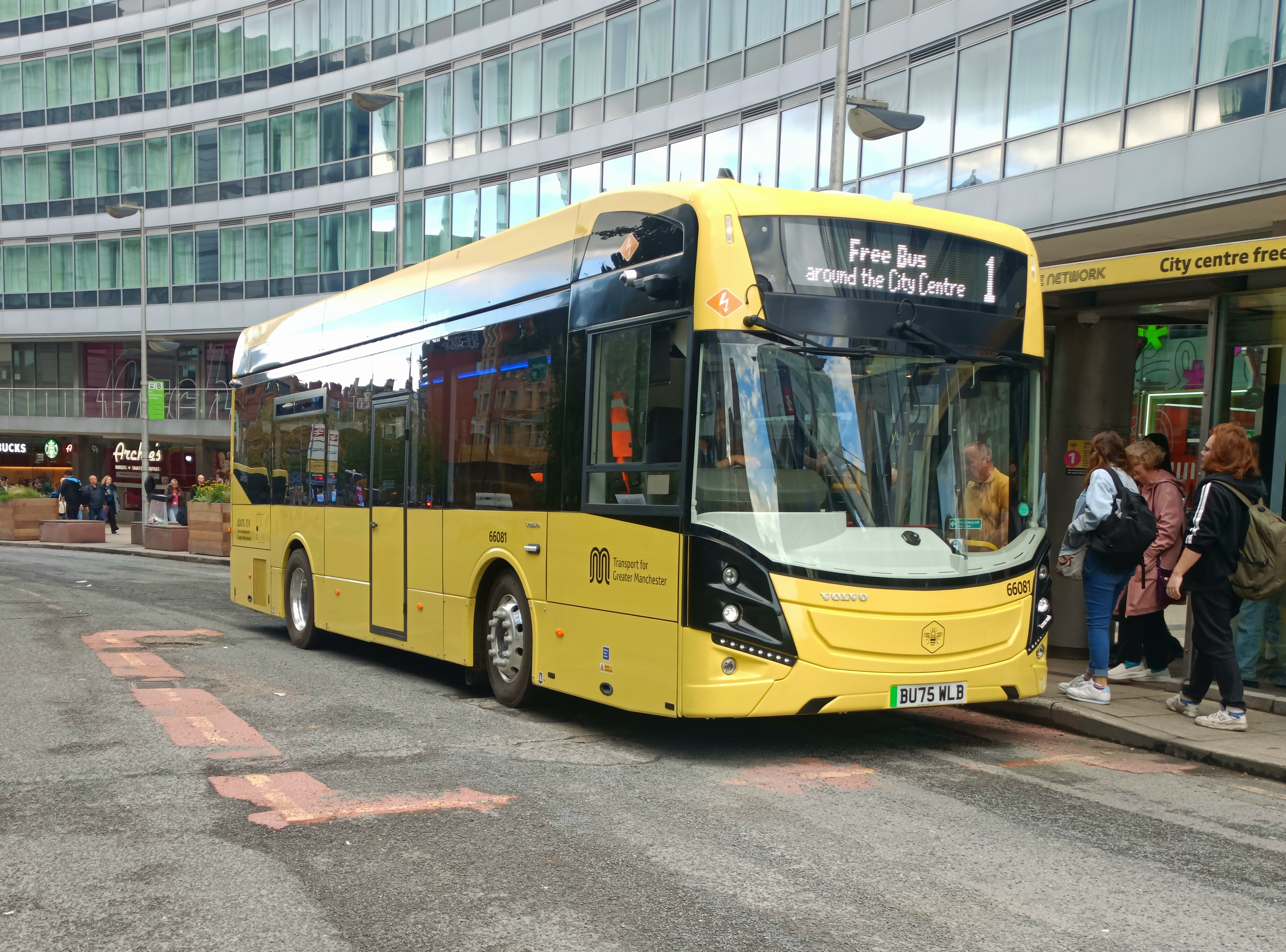
Free bus
TfGM owns the free bus service around Manchester city centre.

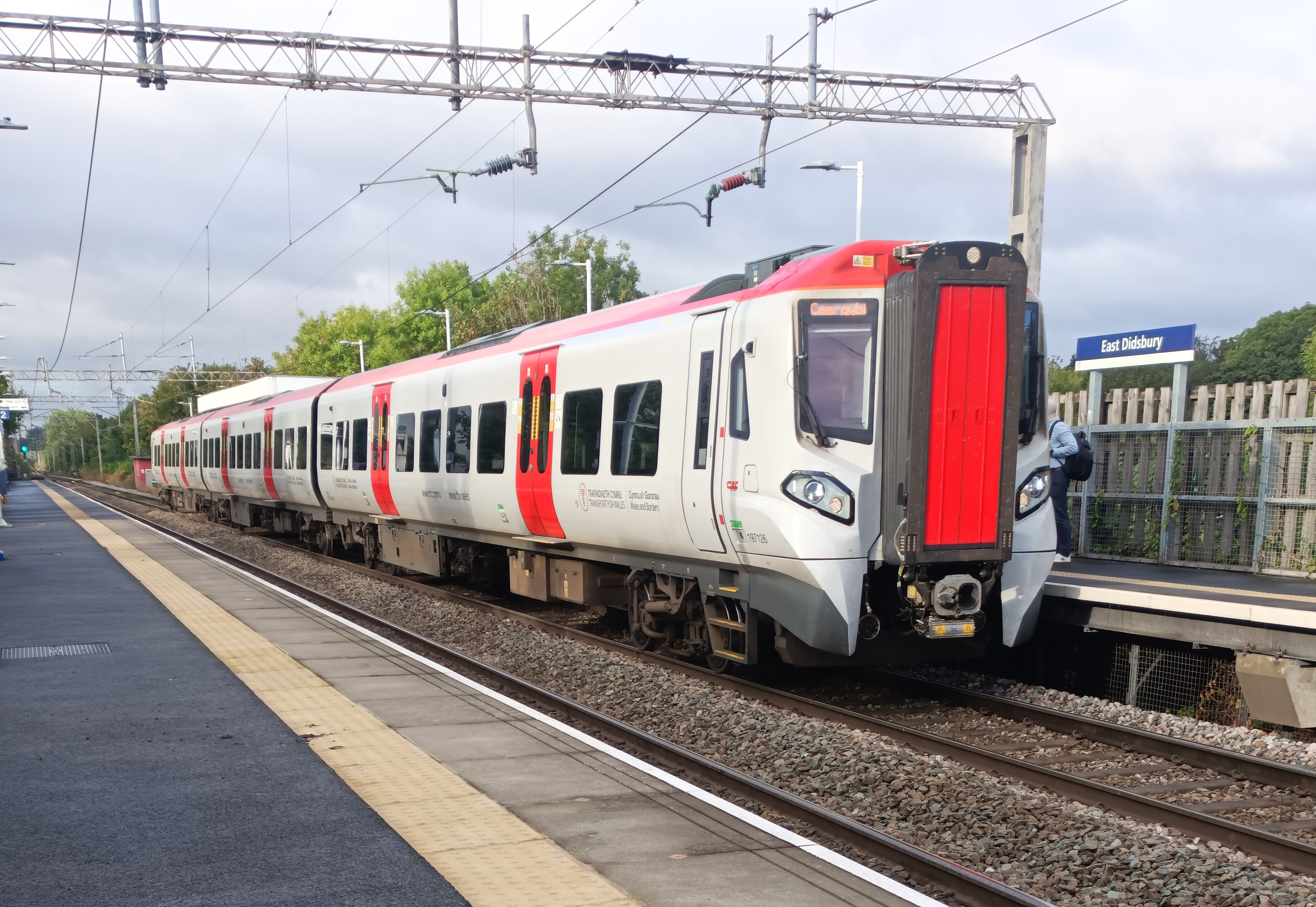
National Rail
Heavy rail services in Greater Manchester are provided by six train operating companies. TfGM subsidises local services and helps to fund station improvements across the county.

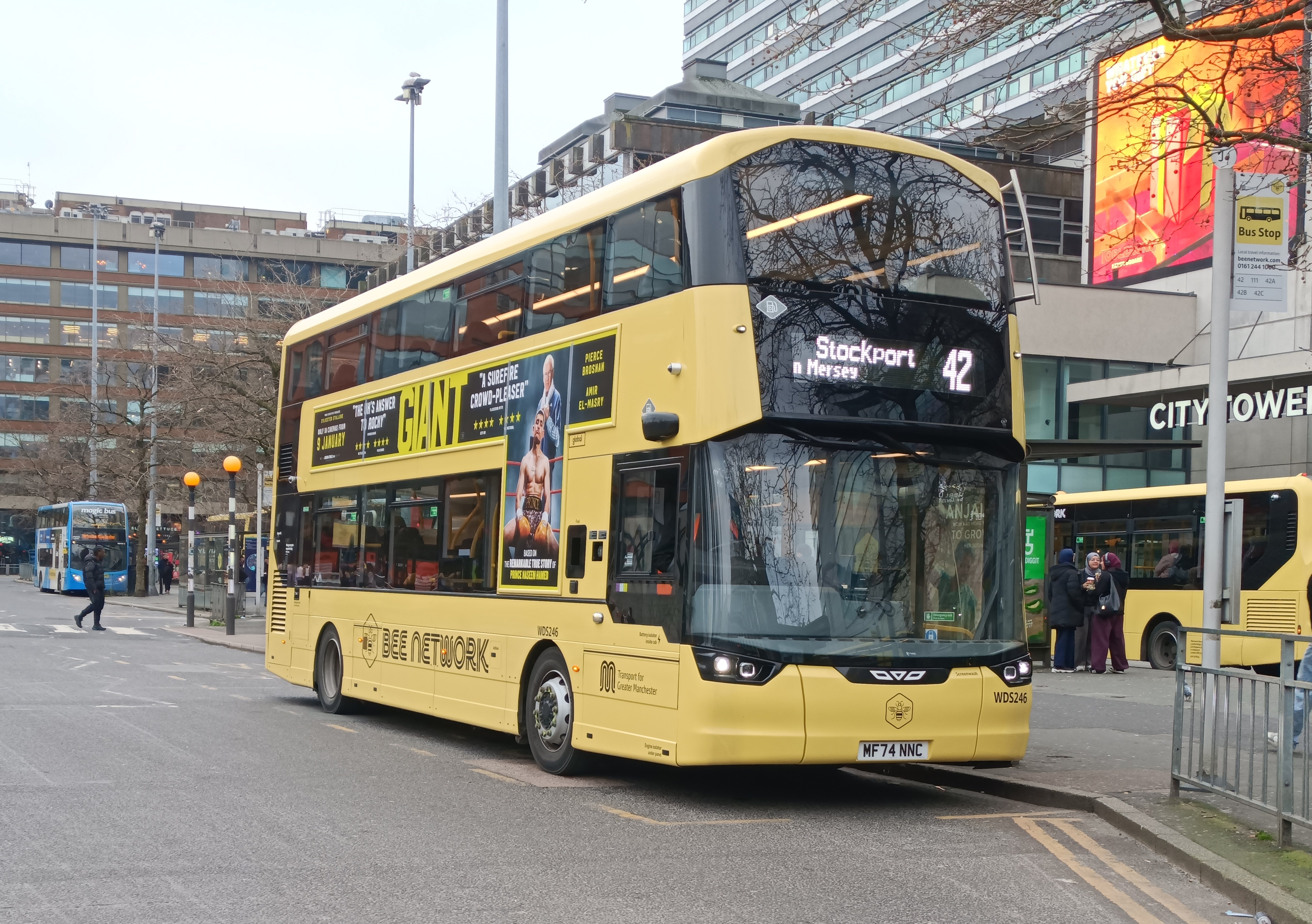
Bus services
TfGM owns and maintains bus stations, stops and shelters. It implemented the System One multi-operator and multi-modal travelcards, and subsidises some fares; however, this was changed by the Bee Network to bring this back under local control, with TfGM appointing franchisees to operate services.

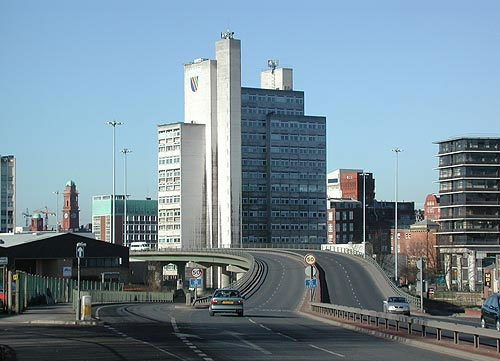
Road management
TfGM is responsible for managing the Key Route Network of major roads, as well as maintenance of traffic signals.

== Bee Network ==
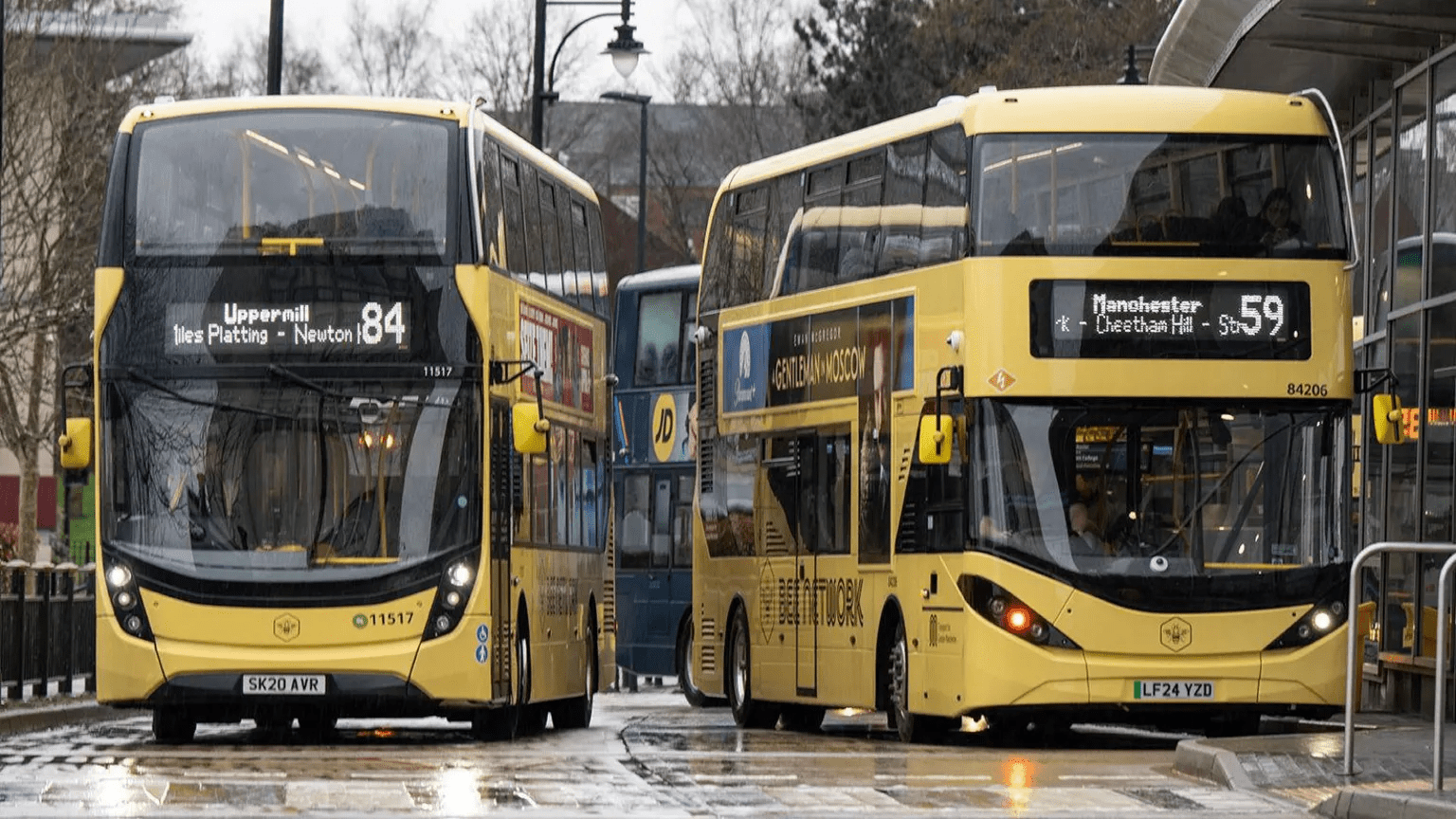
Two Bee Network-branded buses operated by Stagecoach Manchester at Oldham bus station, 2024

The Bee Network is an integrated transport network for Greater Manchester, composed of bus, tram, cycling and walking routes. In 2022, TfGM's vision was established for the network to be operational by 2024, with some specified local railway services joining the network by 2030.

Originally devised in 2018 as a network of active travel routes, the vision for the Bee Network was expanded following the GMCA's decision to use the powers given to it under the Bus Services Act 2017 to introduce a bus franchising scheme for the city region. A fleet of buses were branded and repainted yellow for this in 2024. The active travel subset of the Bee Network was then renamed the Bee Active Network.

Greater Manchester is set to invest a further £40.7 million in its walking, wheeling and cycling infrastructure, as it progresses with its delivery of the largest active travel network in the country. The £23.7 million has been allocated to 13 schemes in total, including a new active travel corridor along Chapel Street in Salford and a striking cycling and walking ‘helix ramp’ as part of the Stockport Interchange, which was opened in 2024.

== Corporate identity ==
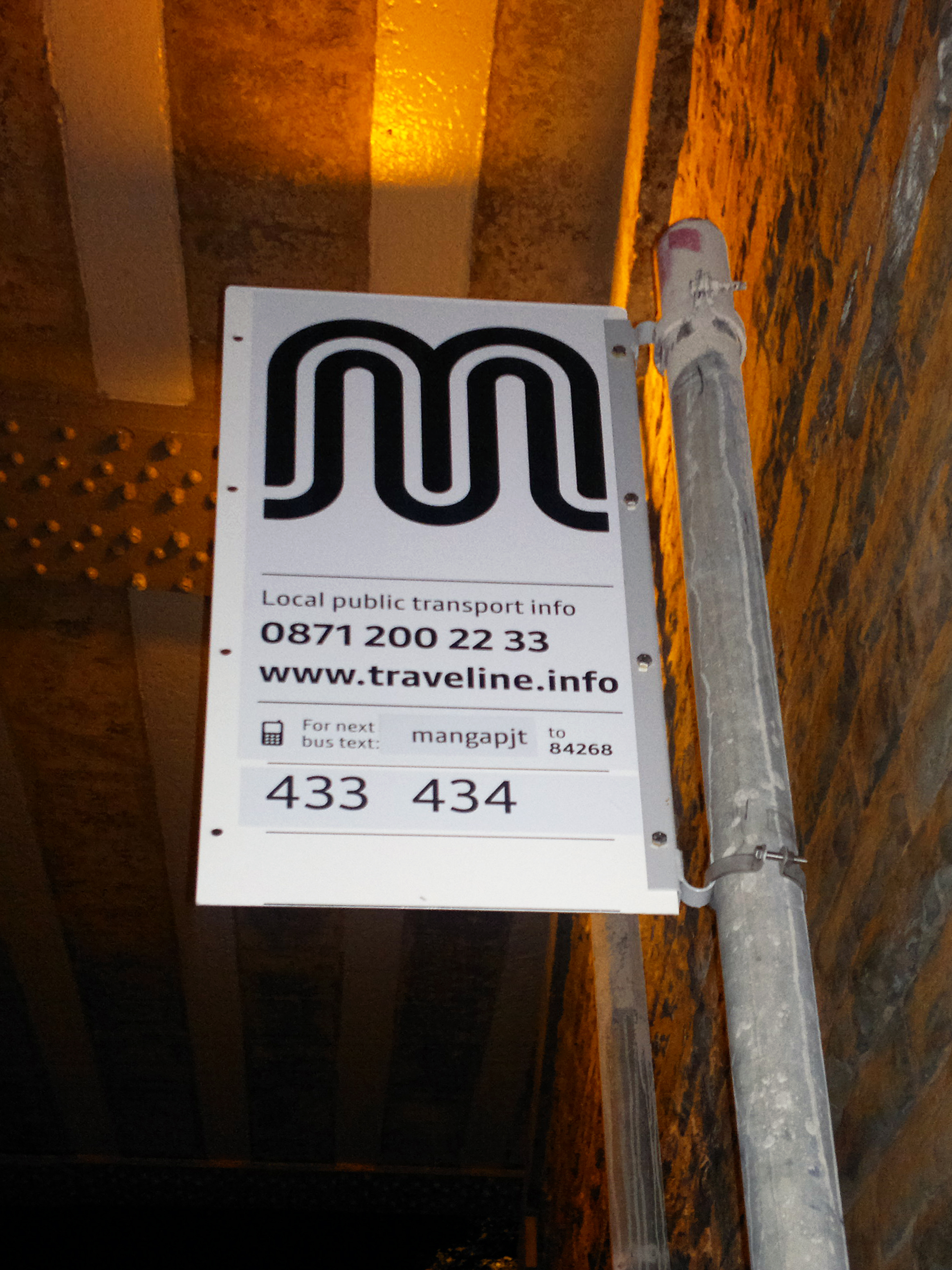
A TfGM bus stop following rebranding, 2011

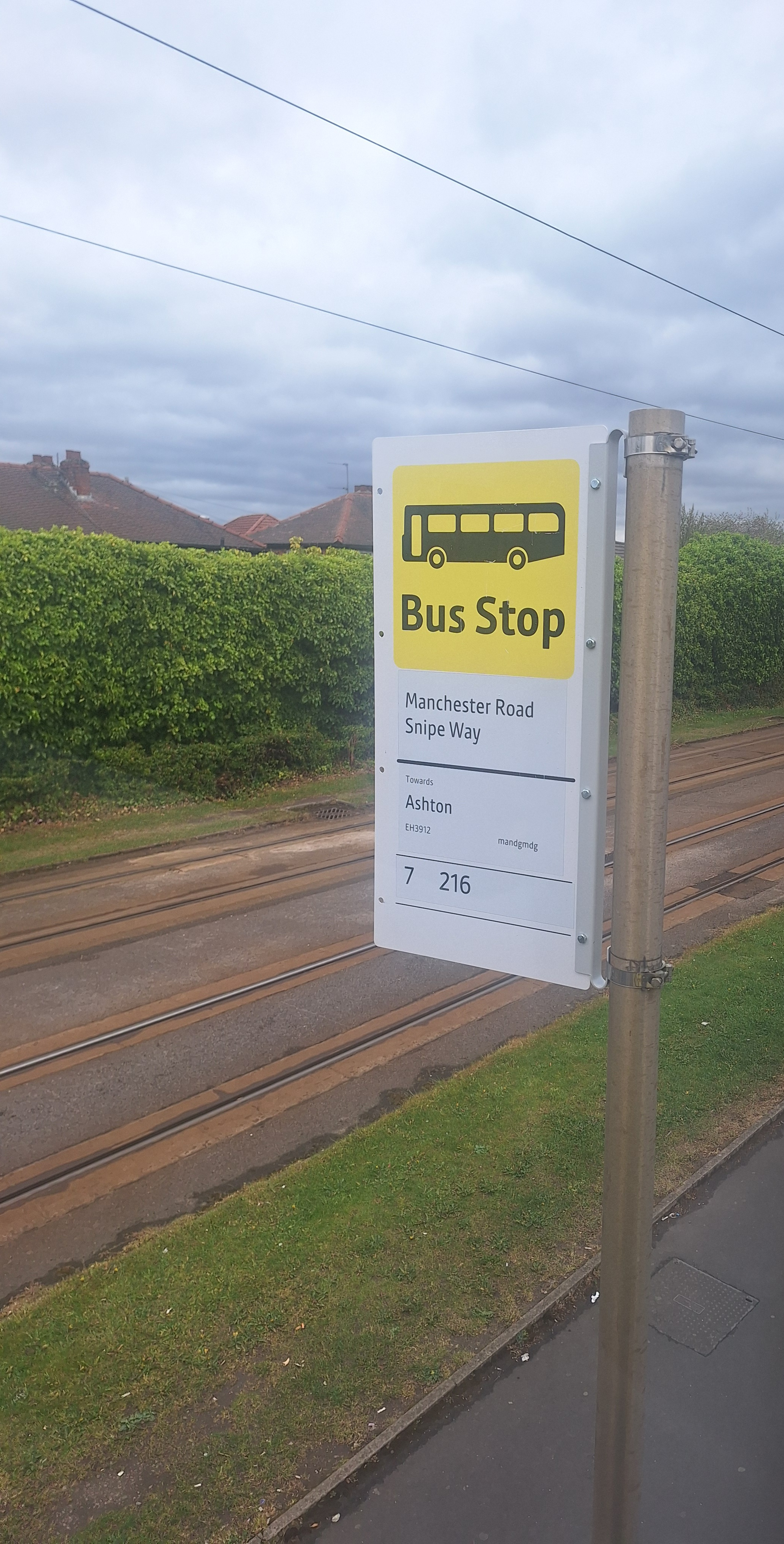
A Bee Network-branded bus stop flag, 2025

TfGM uses a corporate identity designed in-house. The black and white M logo was adapted from the GMPTE logo and was used on bus stops across Greater Manchester. After the rollout of Bee Network bus franchising, bus stop signs are being updated with black Bus Stop wording against a yellow background, with the Bee Network logo appearing in the corner of the sign; the route font remains unchanged.

== See also ==
- History of public transport authorities in Manchester
