= Gorsey Bank =

Former housing estate in Stockport, Greater Manchester, England

Coordinates: 53.404°N 2.187°W

Gorsey Bank is a former housing estate in Stockport, Greater Manchester, England, to the west of the town centre between the River Mersey, the M60 motorway and the A560 Stockport Road. It has since been redeveloped as a business park.

== History ==
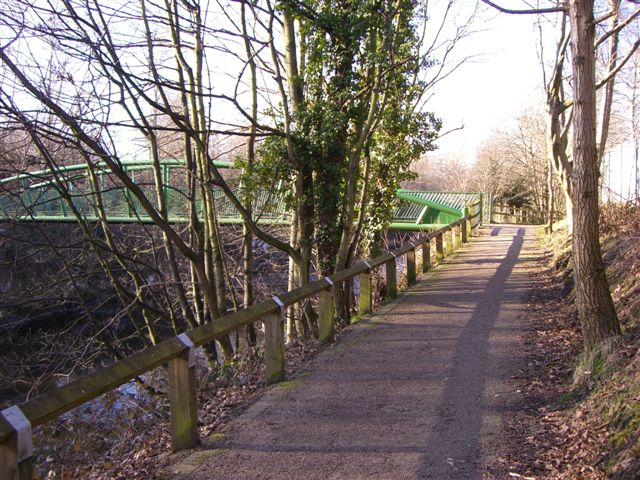
Footbrige crossing the River Mersey from Gorsey Bank to Heaton Mersey

The area was populated by a cotton mill in the 19th century, which had easy access to the Mersey and the London North Western Railway. A sand pit was dug in 1899, and used in the early 20th century before being filled in 1923.

A housing estate was built in the mid to late 1930s, including a number of terraced houses and a recreation ground. By the 1970s, the estate had become one of the worst in Greater Manchester, with a fearsome reputation for vandalism, burglary and arson. A 1978 report in the Stockport Advertiser suggested that the estate should be razed to the ground and turned into industrial units. By the 1990s, Stockport Metropolitan Borough Council had decided to demolish the estate for redevelopment after 200 homes on the estate had become vacant and half the council-housed residents were on a transfer list. In 1999, the last remaining residents moved out and all buildings were demolished. The land sat unused for some years afterwards, and continued to attract antisocial behaviour from youths and fly tipping.

== Redevelopment ==
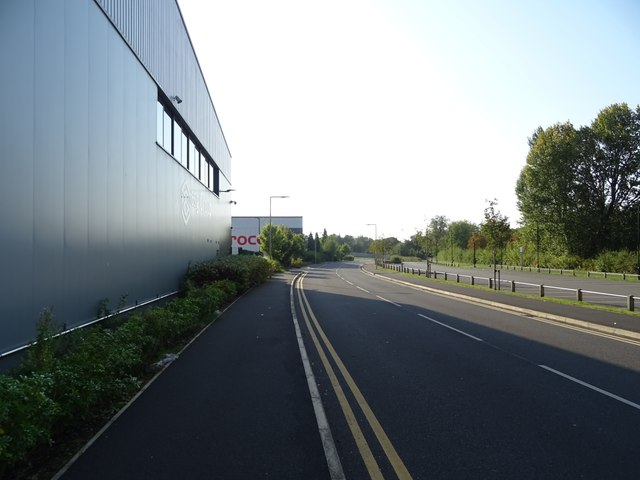
Beacon Way, Aurora Business Park

In 2007, the site was cleared to create a new business park.

In 2015, Stockport MBC planned to invest £10m to regenerate the area with a 145,000 square feet (13,500 m^{2}) light-industrial park, creating a potential 240 new jobs. Work was completed in December 2017 and the site is now Aurora Business Park. The final unit was let in July 2019.
