= List of bus stations in England =

This is a list of bus stations in England. It does not include bus stations in London which are instead covered in List of bus and coach stations in London.

== List ==
| Name | Location | Stances | Connections | Status |
|---|---|---|---|---|
| Altrincham Interchange | Altrincham | 5 | Altrincham railway station | Operating |
| Arundel Gate Interchange | Sheffield | | | Operating |
| Ashton-under-Lyne bus station | Ashton-under-Lyne | 13 | Ashton-under-Lyne tram stop | Operating |
| Aylesbury bus station | Aylesbury | | | Operating |
| Barnsley Interchange | Barnsley | | Barnsley railway station | Operating |
| Bath bus station | Bath | | Bath Spa railway station | Operating |
| Bedford bus station | Bedford | 20 total (12 interior, 8 exterior) | | Operating |
| Bearwood bus station | Smethwick | | | Operating |
| Beeston transport interchange | Beeston | | Beeston Centre tram stop | Operating |
| Beeston bus station | Beeston | | | Closed |
| Birmingham Coach Station | Birmingham | | | Operating |
| Blackburn Boulevard bus station | Blackburn | 14 | | Operating |
| Bolton bus station | Bolton | 23 | | Operating |
| Bradford Interchange | Bradford | | Bradford Interchange railway station | Closed until Jan 2025 |
| Bretonside bus station | Plymouth | | | Closed |
| Brighouse bus station | Brighouse | 6 | | Operating |
| Bristol bus station | Bristol | | | Operating |
| Broadmarsh bus station | Nottingham | | | Operating |
| Burnley bus station | Burnley | 18 | | Operating |
| Bury Interchange | Bury | 19 | Bury tram stop | Operating |
| Canterbury bus station | Canterbury | 25 | | Operating |
| Cardiff Bus Interchange | Cardiff | 14 | Cardiff Central railway station | Operating |
| Castleford bus station | Castleford | 10 | Castleford railway station | Operating |
| Chatham Pentagon bus station | Chatham | | | Closed |
| Chatham Waterfront bus station | Chatham | 13 | | Operating |
| Chequers bus station | Maidstone | | | Operating |
| Chester Bus Interchange | Chester | 13 | | Operating |
| Chorley Interchange | Chorley | | | Operating |
| Cleckheaton bus station | Cleckheaton | 6 | | Operating |
| Clitheroe Interchange | Clitheroe | | | Operating |
| Cradley Heath Interchange | Cradley Heath | 6 | Cradley Heath railway station | Operating |
| Cribbs Causeway bus station | Patchway | | | Operating |
| Derby bus station | Derby | | | Operating |
| Dewsbury bus station | Dewsbury | 19 | Dewsbury railway station | Operating |
| Dudley bus station | Dudley | | | Operating |
| Durham bus station | Durham | | | Operating |
| Eccles Interchange | Eccles | 5 | Eccles tram stop | Operating |
| Eldon Square bus station | Newcastle upon Tyne | 9 | | Operating |
| Exeter bus station | Exeter | | | Operating |
| Four Lane Ends Interchange | Longbenton | 7 | Four Lane Ends Metro Station | Operating |
| Frenchgate Interchange | | 30 | | Operating |
| Freshney bus station | Grimsby | | | Closed |
| Gateshead Interchange | Gateshead | 14 | Gateshead metro station | Operating |
| Gosport bus station | Gosport | | | Operating |
| Greyfriars bus station | Northampton | 27 | | Closed |
| Guildford bus station | Guildford | 22 | | Operating |
| Halesowen bus station | Halesowen | | | Operating |
| Halifax bus station | Halifax | | | Operating |
| Hanley bus station | Hanley | 22 | | Operating |
| Haymarket bus station | Leicester | | | Operating |
| Haymarket bus station | Newcastle upon Tyne | 12 | | Operating |
| Heckmondwike bus station | Heckmondwike | 4 | | Operating |
| Heworth Interchange | Heworth | 8 | Heworth Metro station, Heworth railway station | Operating |
| High Wycombe Coachway | High Wycombe | | | Operating |
| Hillsborough Interchange | Hillsborough | | Hillsborough tram stop | Operating |
| Horsham bus station | Horsham | 5 | | Operating |
| Huddersfield bus station | Huddersfield | 28 | Huddersfield railway station | Operating |
| Hull Paragon Interchange | Kingston upon Hull | | | Operating |
| Keighley bus station | Keighley | 17 | Keighley railway station | Operating |
| Lancaster bus station | Lancaster | | | Operating |
| Leeds City bus station | Leeds | 26 | | Operating |
| Lewes bus station | Lewes | | | Closed |
| Leigh bus station | Leigh | 13 | | Operating |
| Lincoln Transport Hub | Lincoln | | | Operating |
| Longton Interchange | Longton | | | Operating |
| Mansfield bus station | Mansfield | 16 | | Operating |
| Manchester Airport bus station | Manchester | 11 | | Operating |
| Manchester Chorlton Street coach station | Manchester | | | Operating |
| Manchester Piccadilly Gardens bus station | Manchester | | Piccadilly Gardens tram stop | Operating |
| Meadowhall Interchange | Sheffield | | Meadowhall railway station, Meadowhall tram stop | Operating |
| Merry Hill bus station | Brierley Hill | | | Operating |
| MetroCentre Interchange | Gateshead | | MetroCentre railway station | Operating |
| Middlesbrough bus station | Middlesbrough | 21 (plus additional coach stands) | | Operating |
| Middleton bus station | Middleton | 13 | | Operating |
| Milton Keynes Coachway | Milton Keynes | | | Operating |
| Newark bus station | Newark-on-Trent | 5 | | Operating |
| Newcastle coach station | Newcastle upon Tyne | | | Operating |
| Newport bus station | Newport | | | Operating |
| North Gate bus station | Northampton | | | Operating |
| Norwich bus station | Norwich | | | Operating |
| Oldham bus station | Oldham | 12 | | Operating |
| Ossett bus station | Ossett | 6 | | Operating |
| Otley bus station | Otley | 5 | | Operating |
| Park Lane Interchange | Sunderland | 19 | Park Lane Metro station | Operating |
| Plymouth coach station | Plymouth | 7 | | Operating |
| Pontefract bus station | Pontefract | 9 | | Operating |
| Pool Meadow bus station | Coventry | 19 | | Operating |
| Poole bus station | Poole | | | Operating |
| Preston bus station | Preston | | | Operating |
| Radcliffe bus station | Radcliffe | 4 | | Operating |
| Retford bus station | Retford | 8 | | Operating |
| Regent Centre Interchange | Gosforth | 5 | | Operating |
| Rochdale Interchange | Rochdale | 12 | Rochdale Town Centre tram stop | Operating |
| Rotherham Interchange | Rotherham | | | Operating |
| Ryde Transport Interchange | Ryde | | | Operating |
| Salisbury bus station | Salisbury | | | Closed |
| Sheffield Interchange | Sheffield | | | Operating |
| Shrewsbury bus station | Shrewsbury | | | Operating |
| Shudehill Interchange | Manchester | 11 | | Operating |
| Skipton bus station | Skipton | | | Operating |
| Slough bus station | Slough | | | Under renovation |
| South Shields Interchange | South Shields | 16 | South Shields Metro station | Operating |
| Spalding bus station | Spalding | | | Operating |
| Stevenage Bus Interchange | Stevenage | | Stevenage railway station | Operating |
| St Margaret's Bus Station | Leicester | 24 | | Operating |
| St Paul's bus station | Walsall | 14 | | Operating |
| Stockport bus station | Stockport | | | Closed |
| Stockport Interchange | Stockport | 18 | | Operating |
| Stourbridge Interchange | Stourbridge | 9 | Stourbridge Town railway station | Operating |
| Taunton bus station | Taunton | | | Closed |
| Storrington bus station | Storrington | 2 | | Operating |
| Telford Town Centre bus station | Telford | | | Operating |
| Todmorden bus station | Todmorden | 5 | | Operating |
| Trafford Centre bus station | Trafford | 16 | | Operating |
| Wakefield bus station | Wakefield | 24 | | Operating |
| Wallsend Metro station | Wallsend | 3 | | Operating |
| Washington Galleries bus station | Washington | 6 | | Operating |
| Wednesbury bus station | Wednesbury | 11 | | Operating |
| West Bromwich bus station | West Bromwich | 24 | | Operating |
| Wigan bus station | Wigan | 19 | | Operating |
| Wolverhampton bus station | Wolverhampton | 19 | | Operating |
| Workington bus station | Workington | | | Operating |
| Worswick Street bus station | Newcastle upon Tyne | | | Closed |
| Wythenshawe bus station | Wythenshawe | 5 | | Operating |

== See also ==
- List of bus stations in Scotland
- List of bus stations in Wales
