= Greater Manchester bus route 58 =

Bus route in Greater Manchester, England

58
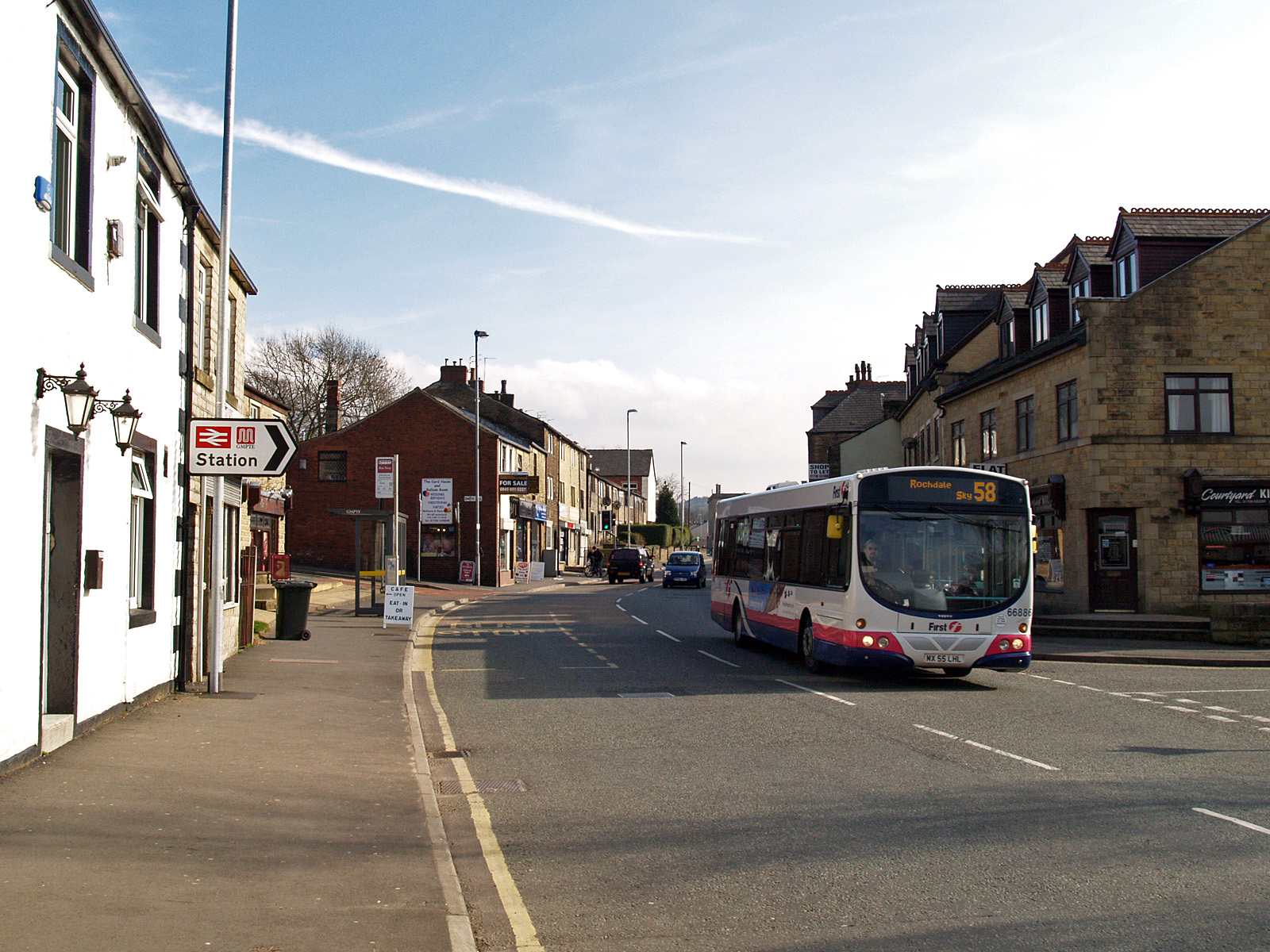
- First Greater Manchester Wright Eclipse bodied Volvo B7RLE in Milnrow in March 2009

Overview
- Operator: First Greater Manchester
- Garage: Oldham
- Vehicle: Volvo B9TL

Route
- Start: Rochdale Interchange
- Via: Milnrow; Newhey; Shaw & Crompton; Oldham; Chadderton
- End: Middleton bus station

Service
- Frequency: Monday-Saturday daytime: 15 minutes (until 2017); 30 minutes (2017-2019); 60 minutes (2019-2020)
- Journey time: 68 minutes
- Operates: 06:00 until 19:00

Greater Manchester Bus route 58 was operated by First Greater Manchester between Rochdale and Middleton bus stations via Milnrow, Newhey, Shaw & Crompton, Oldham and Chadderton. It had a sister route 59 which operated on the same route between Middleton and Shaw, and also served Rushcroft, operated by Stagecoach Manchester on contract from Transport for Greater Manchester prior to Tranche 2 of Bee Network. The route was curtailed to run between Rochdale and Oldham in 2017 and was withdrawn in 2020 during the Coronavirus pandemic. The route is now covered by services 57 and 182.

== History ==
Route 58 was originally operated by GM Buses and operated on almost the same route as today. Evening services previously operated between Rochdale and Newhey, provided by Rossendalebus and Bu-Val Buses, although these journeys are now covered by routes 181, 182 and 451.

The route has had some variations in the past. The service previously ran to the Trafford Centre via the M60 motorway until August 2008, where it was replaced by route 57 between Oldham and Trafford Centre (57 was withdrawn in January 2010)). The service was extended from Middleton to Bury Interchange on behalf of Transport for Greater Manchester in October 2009, but this was withdrawn in July 2011.

In September 2017, First decided to curtail the route to run between Rochdale and Oldham only, with the Oldham-Middleton section covered by an enhanced service 59. Buses had been reduced to every 30 minutes at this time and were reduced again to an hourly service in April 2019.

In March 2020, the route was temporarily withdrawn during the UK-wide lockdown with the route covered by service 59 between Shaw and Oldham and services 181 and 182 between Rochdale and Shaw/Heyside. In September 2020, the 58 route was not re-instated with service 182 running between Rochdale and Shaw and new service 57 running between Shaw and Oldham.

== Route ==
Buses left from stand J at Rochdale Interchange before heading along Milnrow Road (A640) towards Firgrove, where the road changes name to Rochdale Road. Buses turned off the A640 into Milnrow town centre via Bridge Street, Dale Street and Newhey Road. The service continued along Newhey Road as it returns onto the A640 to Newhey. Once in Newhey, the 58 branched off onto the A663 Shaw Road as it heads into the Oldham area, heading past Dunwood Park into Shaw and Crompton.

The service turned off the A663 into Shaw town centre via Milnrow Road, Market Street and High Street before returning to the A663 Crompton Way at the Big Lamp roundabout. The service then headed towards Oldham via the B6194 travelling through Heyside and Higginshaw, passing close to Salmon Fields. At the junction of the B6194/A62, the service turned onto the A62 to head to the Mumps junction and Oldham Mumps Metrolink station. At this point, the service left the A62 and runs through Oldham town centre with the service taking two routes between Princes Street at Mumps and the bus station. Westbound buses run via Union Street, Clegg Street (former bus station), Yorkshire Street and St Mary's Way, while eastbound buses run via St Mary's Way, Lord Street, High Street and Yorkshire Street.

When buses ran towards Middleton, buses would leave Oldham bus station and travel along Middleton Road (A669) through Westwood, Chadderton and Firwood Park. Buses then went past Mills Hill railway station where the A669 road renames to Oldham Road as the service continued to Middleton and terminates at the town's bus station.

== Vehicles ==
The main type of vehicle used on journeys on route 58 were Volvo B9TLs, which did have route branding for the 58 and its sister service, the 59. The main alternative vehicle used on the route were Volvo B7RLEs, which were the previous prominent vehicle on the route.
