= Grosvenor Centre =

Shopping centre in Northampton, England

Coordinates: 52.2389°N 0.8953°W

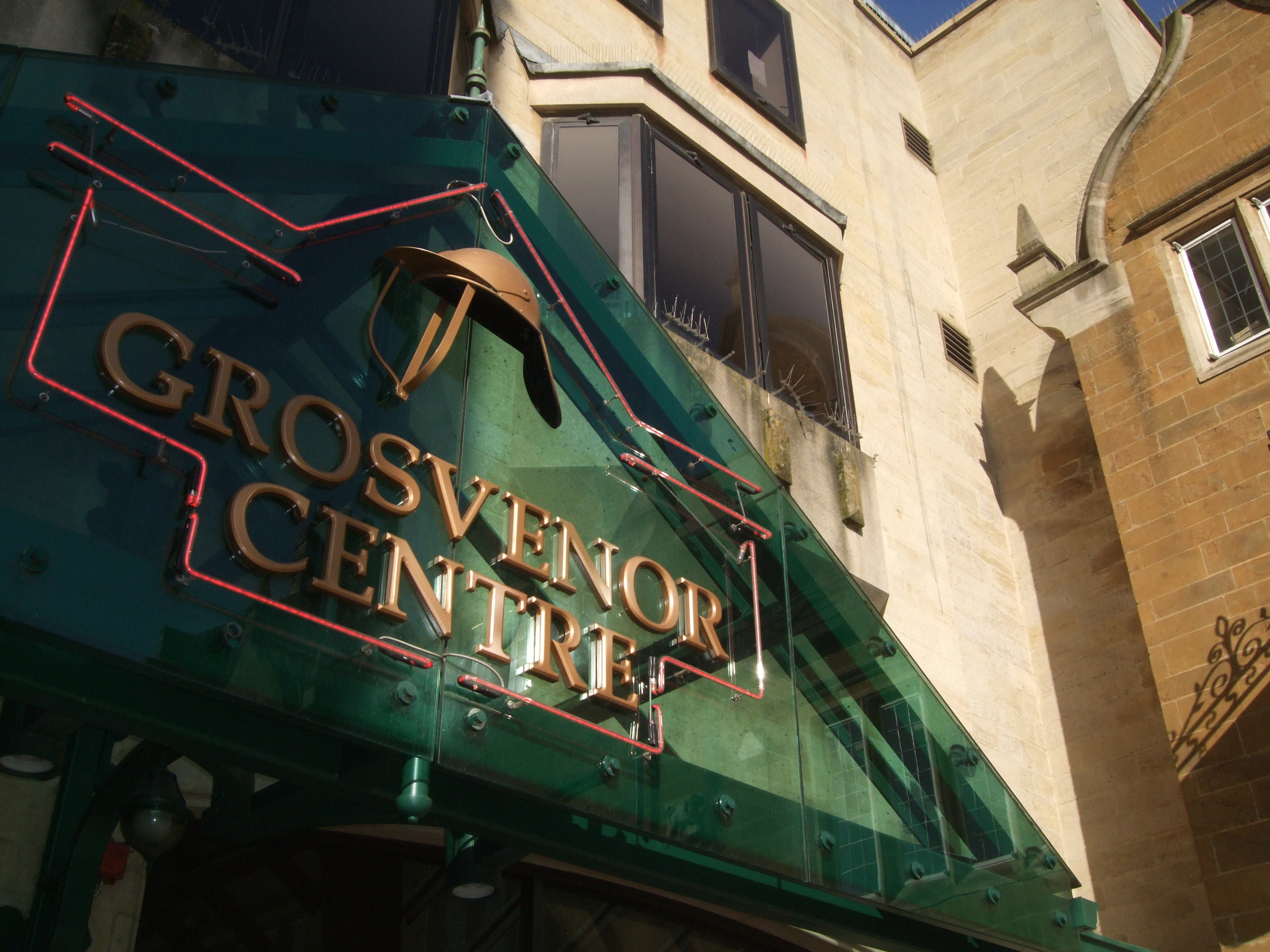
The Grosvenor Centre, Northampton. Market Square entrance.

The Grosvenor Centre is a shopping centre in the town centre of Northampton, England. Work started in 1972 and the building opened in 1975.

The two-level centre is located adjacent to Market Square, and is owned by Evolve Estates, after purchasing the centre from Legal & General in 2023 for an undisclosed sum. In 2014 it underwent a £3 million refurbishment.

== Location ==
The Grosvenor Centre is located on the site of a previous medieval monastery in the centre of Northampton. The centre is linked to both the Market Square and Abington Street. It has its own multi-storey car park and was formerly connected to the Greyfriars bus station. The North Gate bus station is just west of the shopping centre.

== Stores ==
As of January 2023 stores located in the Grosvenor Centre include: Boots, Primark, The Entertainer, W H Smith, Superdrug, Superdry and Next.

== Future ==
House of Fraser, unable to commit to a long-term lease, closed in March 2014, and was replaced by Next and Primark.

With the proposed closure of the adjacent Greyfriars bus station, the centre was due to expand over the reclaimed site. However, this proposal was terminated on the 14 July 2014, and the bus station site given back to Northampton Borough Council. L&G then announced a £3 million refurbishment of the centre, due for completion in September 2014, involving new entrance canopies, refurbished toilets, updated ceilings, lighting, flooring, lifts and signage.

The Grosvenor Centre spans over 320,000 square feet of retail, food and leisure space. The centre has more than 50 shops and eateries with an individual mix of stores and high street brands.
