= Radcliffe tram stop =

Manchester Metrolink tram stop

Radcliffe
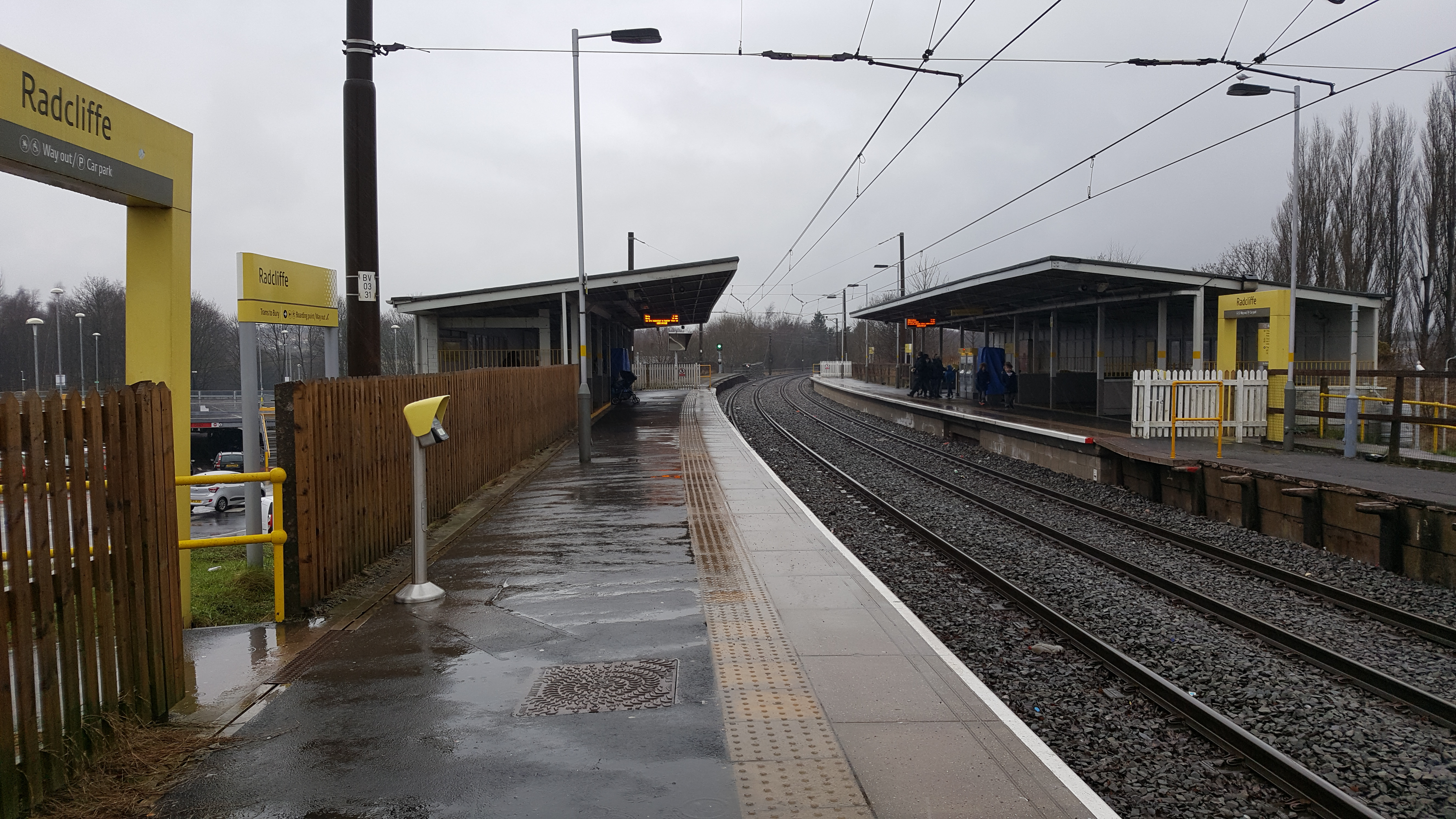
- Radcliffe Metrolink station in January 2017

General information
- Location: Radcliffe, Bury; England
- Coordinates: 53.56238°N 2.32103°W
- Grid reference: SD788073
- System: Metrolink station
- Line: Bury Line
- Platforms: 2

Other information
- Status: In operation
- Fare zone: 4

History
- Opened: 1 September 1879
- Former names: Radcliffe New; Radcliffe Central
- Original company: Lancashire and Yorkshire Railway
- Pre-grouping: Lancashire and Yorkshire Railway
- Post-grouping: London, Midland and Scottish Railway; British Rail

Key dates
- 6 April 1992: Conversion to Metrolink operation
- 1 July 1933; 3 May 1971: Renamed
Route map
Location

Radcliffe is a tram stop in the town of Radcliffe, Greater Manchester, England. It is on the Bury Line of Greater Manchester's light rail Metrolink system.

== History ==
It originally opened on 1 September 1879 as Radcliffe New railway station on the former heavy rail line from Manchester Victoria to Bury. It was named Radcliffe Central railway station to differentiate it from Radcliffe Bridge railway station on the line from Manchester to Bury via Clifton which closed in 1966.

It was rebuilt in 1956 to the designs of the architect John Broome

== Metrolink ==
The stop lies within Ticketing Zone 4. There is a walkway from the stop towards the town centre and Radcliffe Bus Station (a 5 minute walk from the end of the walkway). A blue neon sign adorns the front of the station which reads "From the tower, falls the shadow", this was added in 2005. The station is located across from Radcliffe Leisure Centre, Spring Lane School, and a popular National Cycle Network route which was a continuation of the railway line. Also, there is a Park & Ride located at this stop; therefore, there is a three-story car park at this stop.

== Services ==
Services mostly run every 12 minutes on 2 routes, forming a 6-minute service between Bury and Manchester at peak times.

Preceding station	Manchester Metrolink	Following station
Whitefield towards Altrincham	Altrincham–Bury (peak only)	Bury Terminus
Whitefield towards Piccadilly	Piccadilly–Bury	Bury Terminus
Proposed
Whitefield towards Altrincham	Altrincham–Bury (peak only)	Elton Reservoir towards Bury
Whitefield towards Piccadilly	Piccadilly–Bury	Elton Reservoir towards Bury

== Connecting bus routes ==
Radcliffe Metrolink station is served by the Bee Network's 524 and 513 service. The 524 serves Bury, Radcliffe and Bolton frequently and the 513 serves Bury, Radcliffe and Farnworth every hour. Radcliffe Metrolink is also served by Radcliffe bus station (5 minute walk away).

== Gallery ==
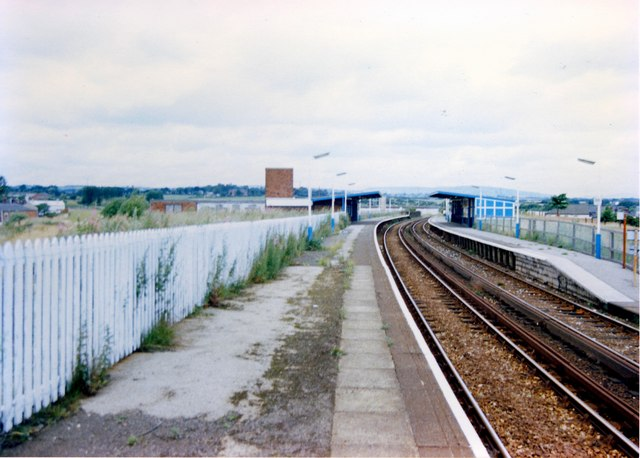
Radcliffe Central railway station in 1988

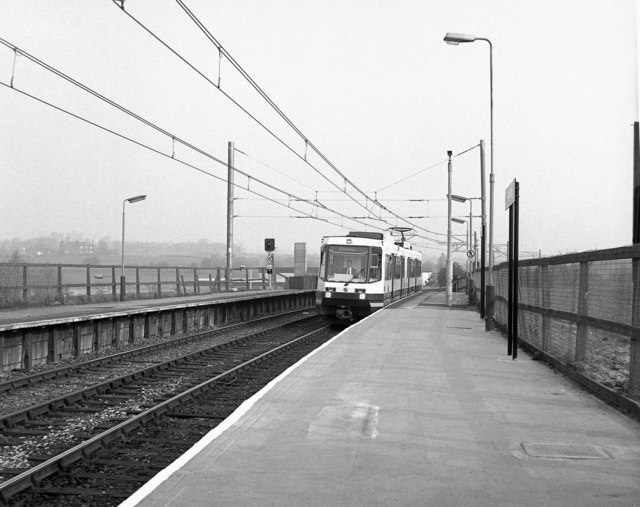
Metrolink tram arrives at Radcliffe in 1992

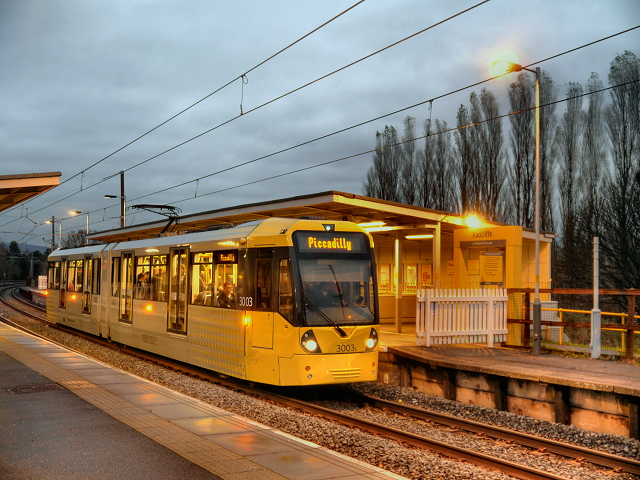
Metrolink M5000 arrives at Radcliffe in 2012
