= Whitefield railway station =

Whitefield railway station may refer to:

- Whitefield railway station (England), a former station in Bury, Greater Manchester, now a Metrolink tram stop
- Whitefield railway station (Bengaluru), in India, on the Bengaluru—Chennai route
