= Elton Reservoir tram stop =

Tram station in Bury, UK

Elton Reservoir

General information
- Location: Bury, Bury; England
- Coordinates: 53.57504°N 2.31325°W
- System: Metrolink station
- Line: Bury Line
- Platforms: 2

Other information
- Fare zone: 4
Route map
Location

Elton Reservoir, also known as Warth Fold, is a proposed tram stop on the Bury Line of Greater Manchester's Metrolink light rail system. It is to be located between Bury Interchange and Radcliffe Metrolink station, southeast of Elton Reservoir and south of Bury town centre.

== Background ==
The proposal is identified in the Greater Manchester Spatial Framework to serve new housing development around Elton Reservoir.

Transport for Greater Manchester funding was confirmed for the stop in June 2025.

== Services ==
Preceding station	Manchester Metrolink	Following station
Proposed
Radcliffe towards Altrincham	Altrincham–Bury (peak only)	Bury Terminus
Radcliffe towards Piccadilly	Piccadilly–Bury	Bury Terminus
