= Spalding bus station =

Bus station in Lincolnshire, England

Coordinates: 52.7900°N 0.1537°W

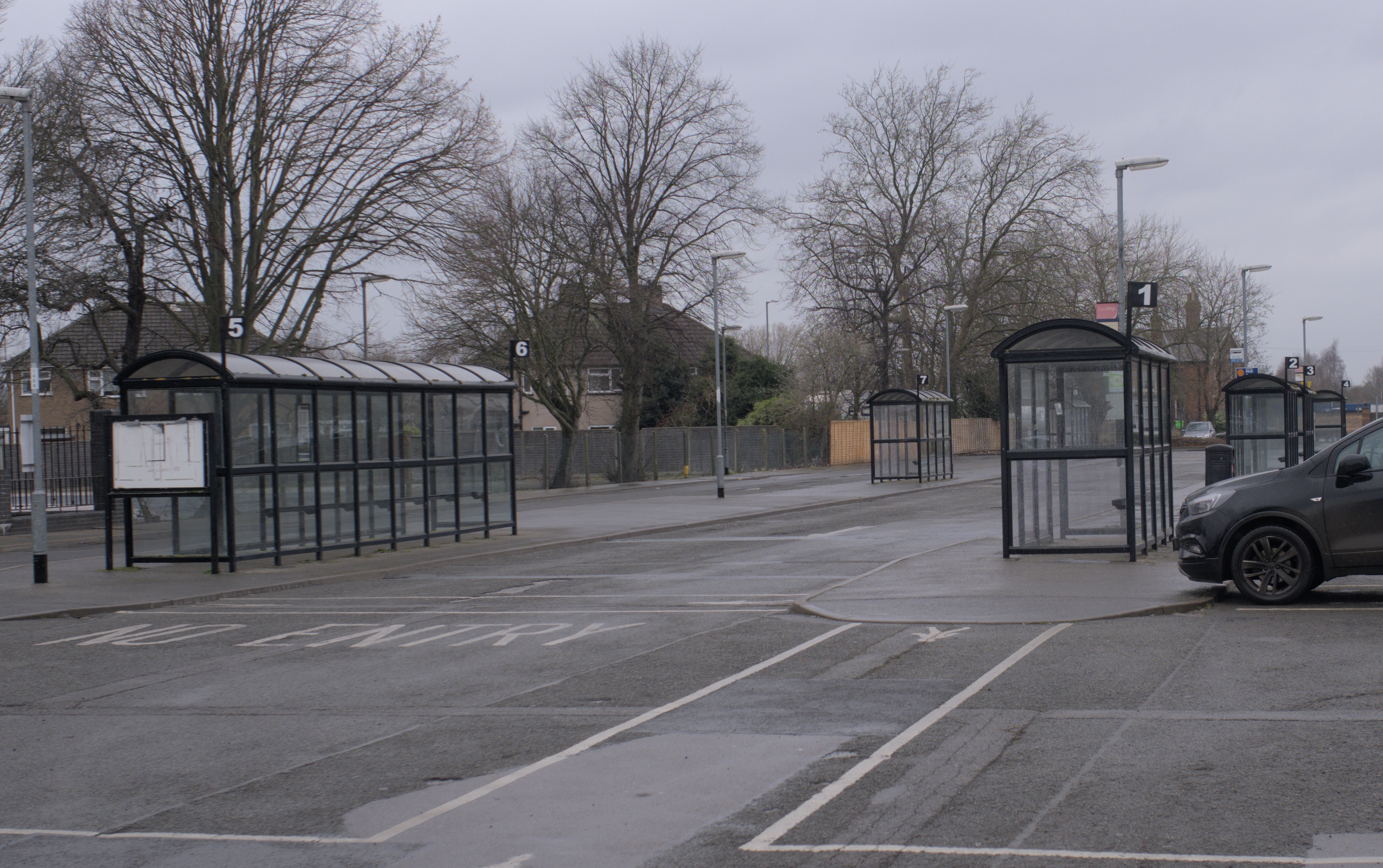
Spalding bus station in 2022

Spalding bus station is a bus station in Spalding, Lincolnshire. It is owned and operated by South Holland District Council.

== History ==
Plans for the bus station were being discussed in the 1940s. The bus station opened in 1956.

On 3 October 2022, a £100,000 refurbishment of the bus station began. The work saw the lanes resurfaced, curbing replaced, and shelters cleaned.
