= Greyfriars bus station =

Former bus station in Northampton, England

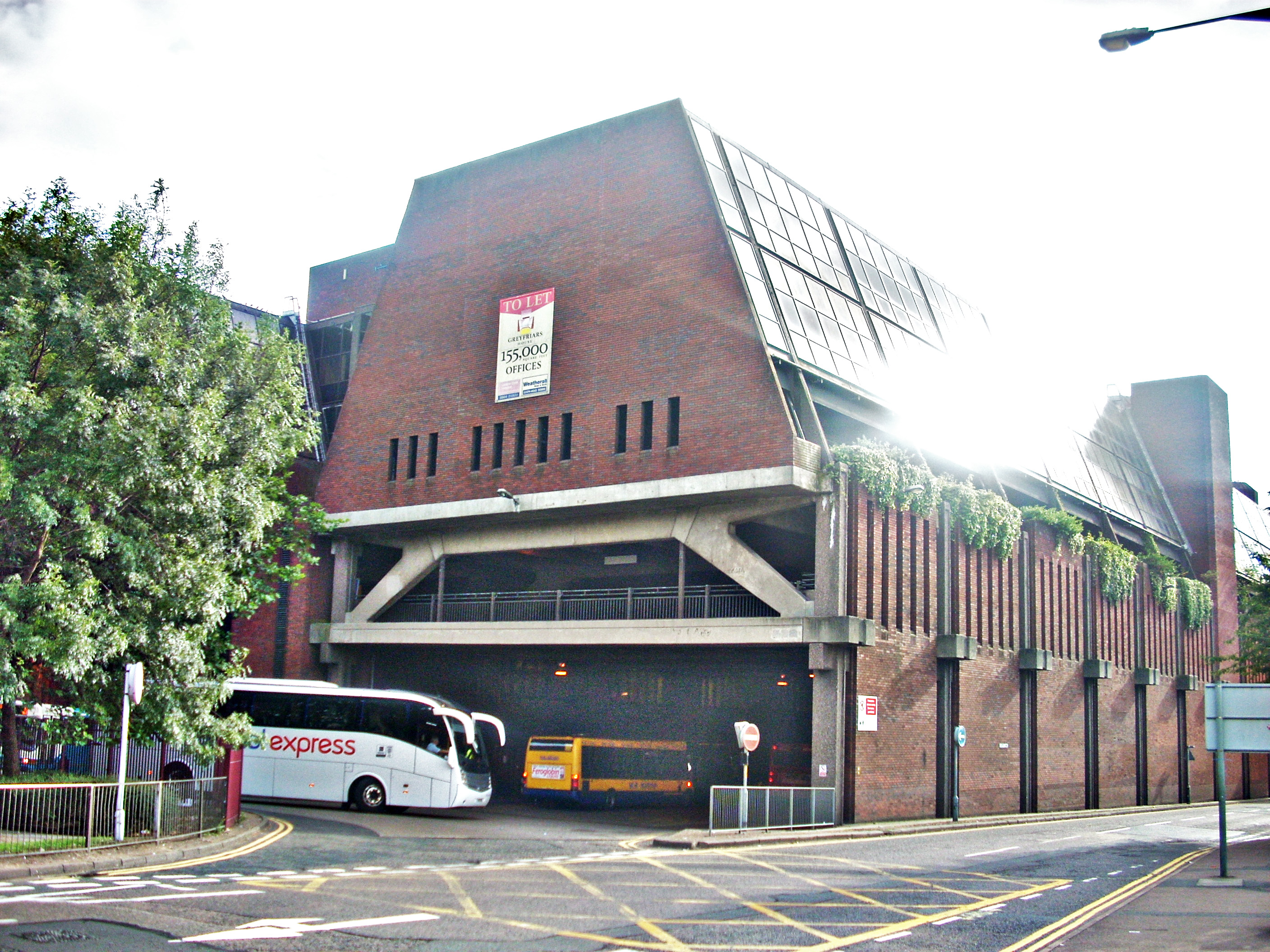

General information
- Location: Lady's Lane; Northampton; England
- Coordinates: 52.2398°N 0.8963°W
- Operator: Northampton Borough Council
- Bus stands: 28 (1–20; A–H)
- Bus operators: Stagecoach Midlands, Uno, Meridian Buses
- Connections: Northampton (1 km)

History
- Opened: 1976
- Closed: 2 March 2014
Location

Greyfriars bus station was a bus station which formerly served the town of Northampton, England. It was owned and managed by Northampton Borough Council.

The station was situated in Northampton town centre between Greyfriars (street) and Lady's Lane. Access was available from the Grosvenor Shopping Centre, The Mounts and Sheep Street. Entry from street level was via a pedestrian subway, with the bus stands accessible via an escalator or lift.

Services were relocated to North Gate bus station from 2 March 2014, and the structure demolished using explosives on 15 March 2015.

== History ==
Built at a cost of £7,250,000 (£50,000,000 at 2013 prices), Greyfriars bus station was opened in 1976, replacing the previous facility at Derngate, and was designed by Arup Associates and built by Kyle Stewart. The building was designed to accommodate 40,000 passengers and 1,700 buses a day and included a complex brief of a bus station, with car park over, topped by a three-storey office block (Greyfriars House). The office block was supported over the clear spans below by a complex structural design based around reinforced concrete trusses. The new station was built in response to the then needs of Northampton: supplying well-organised local travel for the rapidly increasing population of the urban area, bringing visitors into the commercial centre of the town, and providing ready access to the new Grosvenor Centre.

Having been first proposed in 1972 with a budget of £2,578,000, construction work started in August 1973 with a revised budget of £3,308,000 and an original opening date of 1 October 1974; the building eventually opened (although the office block was still under construction) on 25 April 1976. Initial reviews were mixed, and some deficiencies in the design started to manifest themselves early on. On the first weekend of operation one of the lifts broke down, and just a month after opening the building was labelled "useless" by disabled bus users. Eighteen months after opening, in September 1977, mineral stalactites (calthemites) had started forming on the ceilings of some of the underpass walkways within the building, an issue which would continue throughout the building's life.

Greyfriars House was envisaged as a way for the building's owners, Northampton Borough Council, to pay off the increased construction cost of the building; however, despite being completed at the end of 1976, this section of the building remained empty until 1981. Council officials were able to broker a deal with the Dutch engineering firm Lummus whereby they would relocate from their offices in London, to Northampton. Whilst one of the conditions on the new tenants was that they would have to spend £1.5 million modernising the building, the Council granted a five-year rent-free period in exchange. In 1986, as the five-year period was coming to an end, Lummus announced plans to pull out of the UK and the offices once again became vacant. Barclaycard agreed to take the lease of the top floor of the building the same year, later taking on the whole three floors in 1987. A decade later, however, Barclaycard also left the building in a move which cost the Council an estimated £1,800,000 (1998 figures) in rental income. The office space remained empty until the building was closed on 2 March 2014.

In 2007, the 300-space first-floor car park was closed, albeit temporarily, over concerns that chemicals were leaking through the upper stories of the building and causing damage to vehicles parked in the car park below. The car park later reopened, although it closed for good a year later after the Council was unwilling to make the investment (reported at the time to be on the order of £250,000) to rectify the situation.

== Services ==
The main operators at Greyfriars bus station were Stagecoach, Centrebus, Uno and Meridian Buses. Some smaller operators also used the facility.

Buses ran from the bus station all around the town and went as far afield as Milton Keynes, Bedford, Peterborough, Leicester, Rugby and Bicester.

National Express Coaches also operated to Northampton on routes serving many other parts of the country.

Services included a travel centre, operated by Stagecoach, as well as a newsagent, public toilets, optician, hairdressers, barber shop and a large cafe.

== Closure ==
As the bus station was below both Greyfriars House and the car park, only a small amount of natural light reached the concourse, which did not help the building's reputation. It was listed in a survey carried out by The Guardian, for Channel 4's Demolition series, as the third-most hated building in Britain and dubbed "the mouth of Hell".

In 2009, Northampton Borough Council announced plans to redevelop the bus station along with the neighbouring Grosvenor Centre. The plan proposed moving the bus station to a new site, and then extending the Grosvenor Centre on to the cleared land.

In September 2011 it was announced that the site of the former Fish Market was the preferred site for the new bus station and that work to build the new bus station could start as soon as September 2012. The building was expected to be finished by May 2013, although the date of completion was later delayed. At the time of this announcement it was claimed by the council that the cost of refurbishing the Greyfriars building would be over £30 million, with currently £500,000 spent on superficial maintenance.

Greyfriars closed after the final bus services on 1 March 2014, with North Gate opening the following day.

== Redevelopment ==
Demolition work within Greyfriars House began in March 2013 with works to strip the interiors of the office spaces and clearing of the overgrown landscaped courtyards within the office complex, which had lain untended since Barclaycard vacated some 16 years earlier. The bus station was demolished on Sunday 15 March 2015 in a controlled implosion by DSM Demolition. using over 2,000 separate charges. 414 properties were evacuated, and the Grosvenor Centre was closed the night prior to the demolition – which, scheduled to take place at an unannounced time between 8 am and 10 am, occurred at approximately 9.40 am.

== Gallery ==
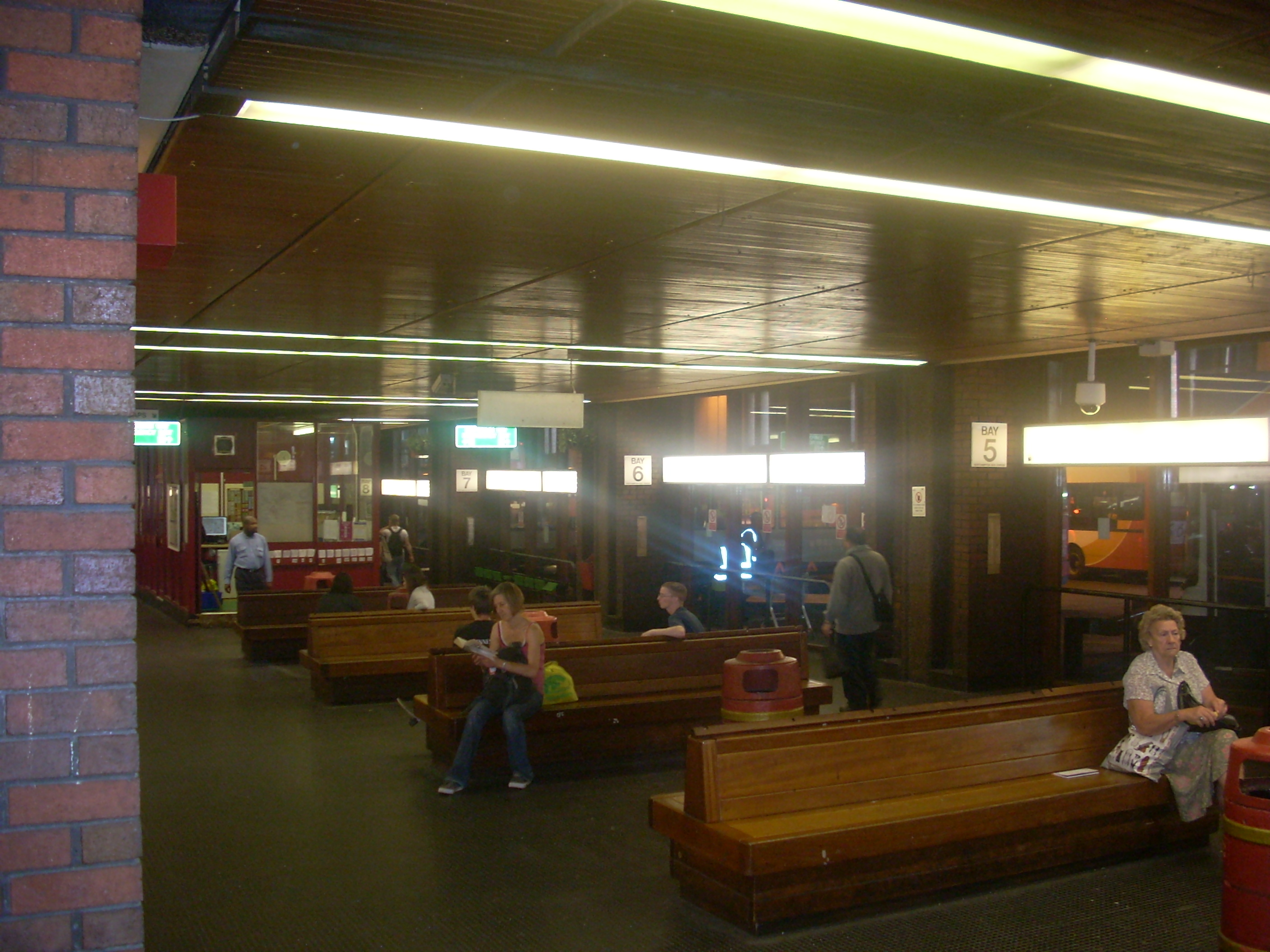
Inside Greyfriars bus station

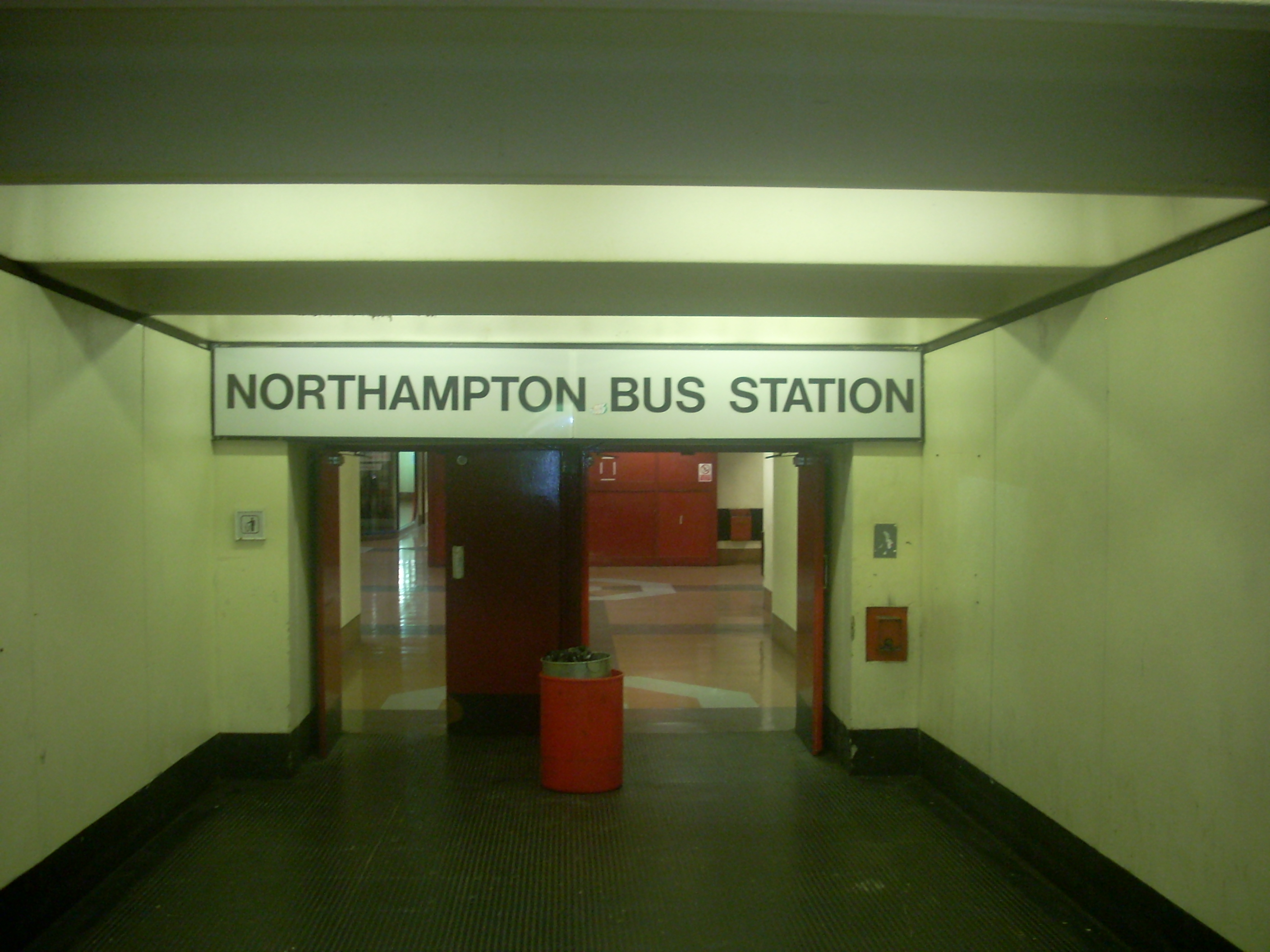
A subway entrance to the bus station

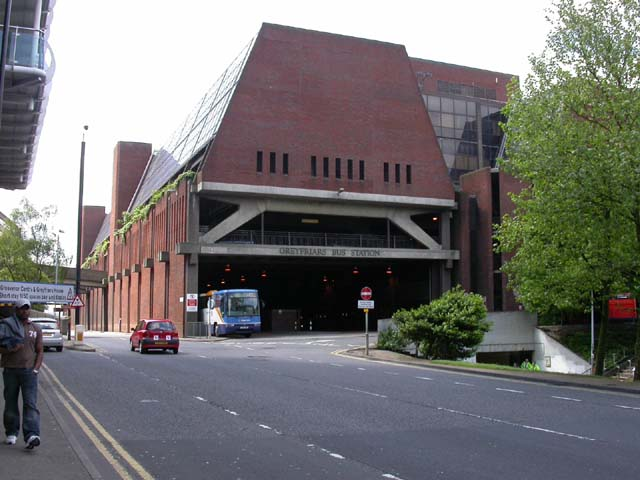
Another entrance to the bus station

== See also ==
- List of Brutalist structures
