= Plymouth coach station =

Bus station in Plymouth, England

Plymouth
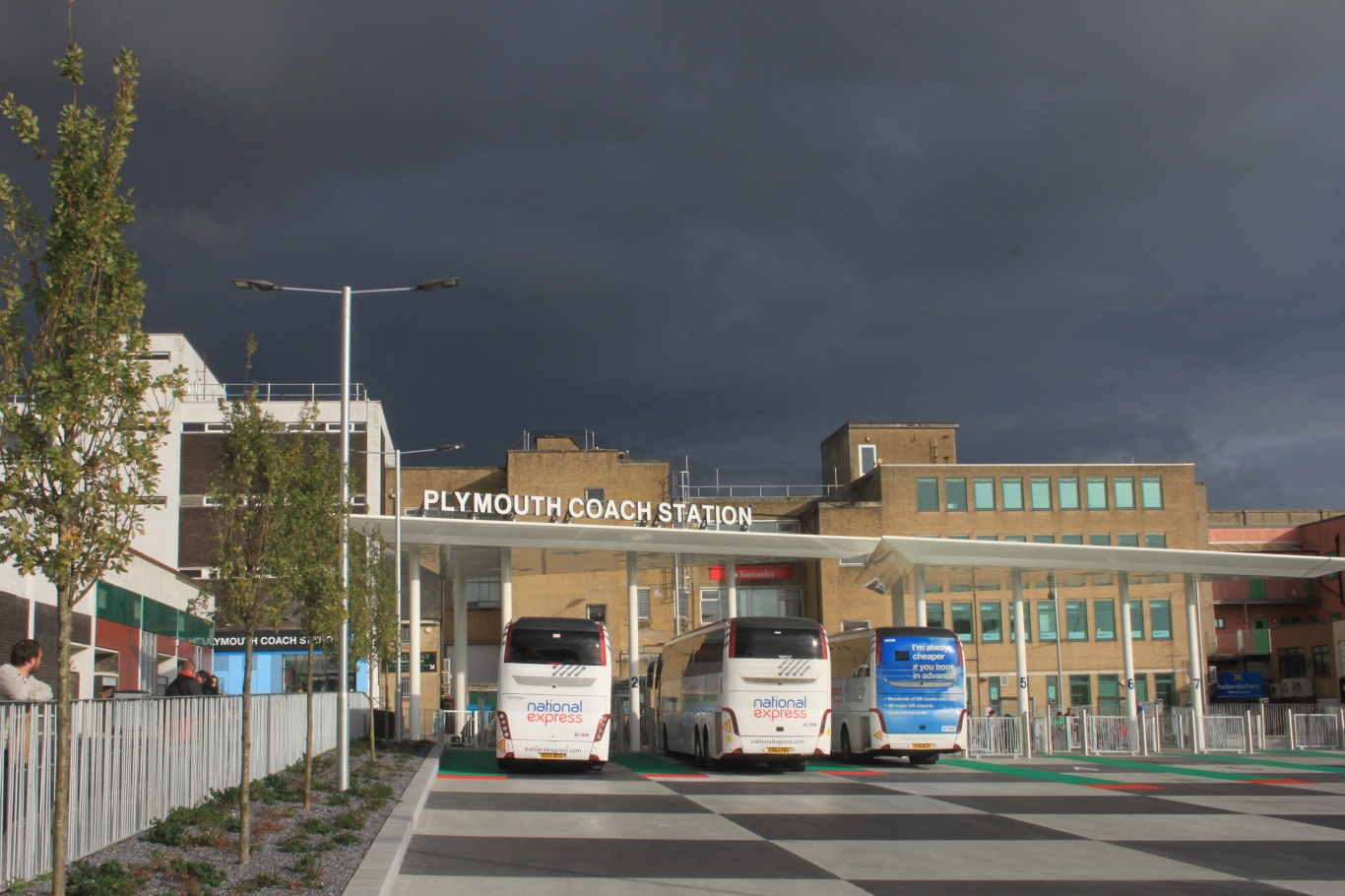

General information
- Location: Plymouth; England
- Coordinates: 50°22′22.22″N 4°8′39.69″W
- System: Bus station
- Operator: National Express
- Bus stands: 7

History
- Opened: 8 September 2016
Location

Plymouth coach station is a terminus for intercity bus services located in Plymouth, England.

== History ==
Plans for the coach station were formally submitted to planners in January 2015. Construction on the coach station began in January 2016. It replaced Bretonside bus station on opening. It opened on 8 September 2016, following an opening ceremony the previous day.

== Operation ==
The coach station is operated by National Express. It has seven bays for coaches. Services from National Express and South West Falcon call at the station.
