= Bury Interchange =

Transport hub in Greater Manchester, England

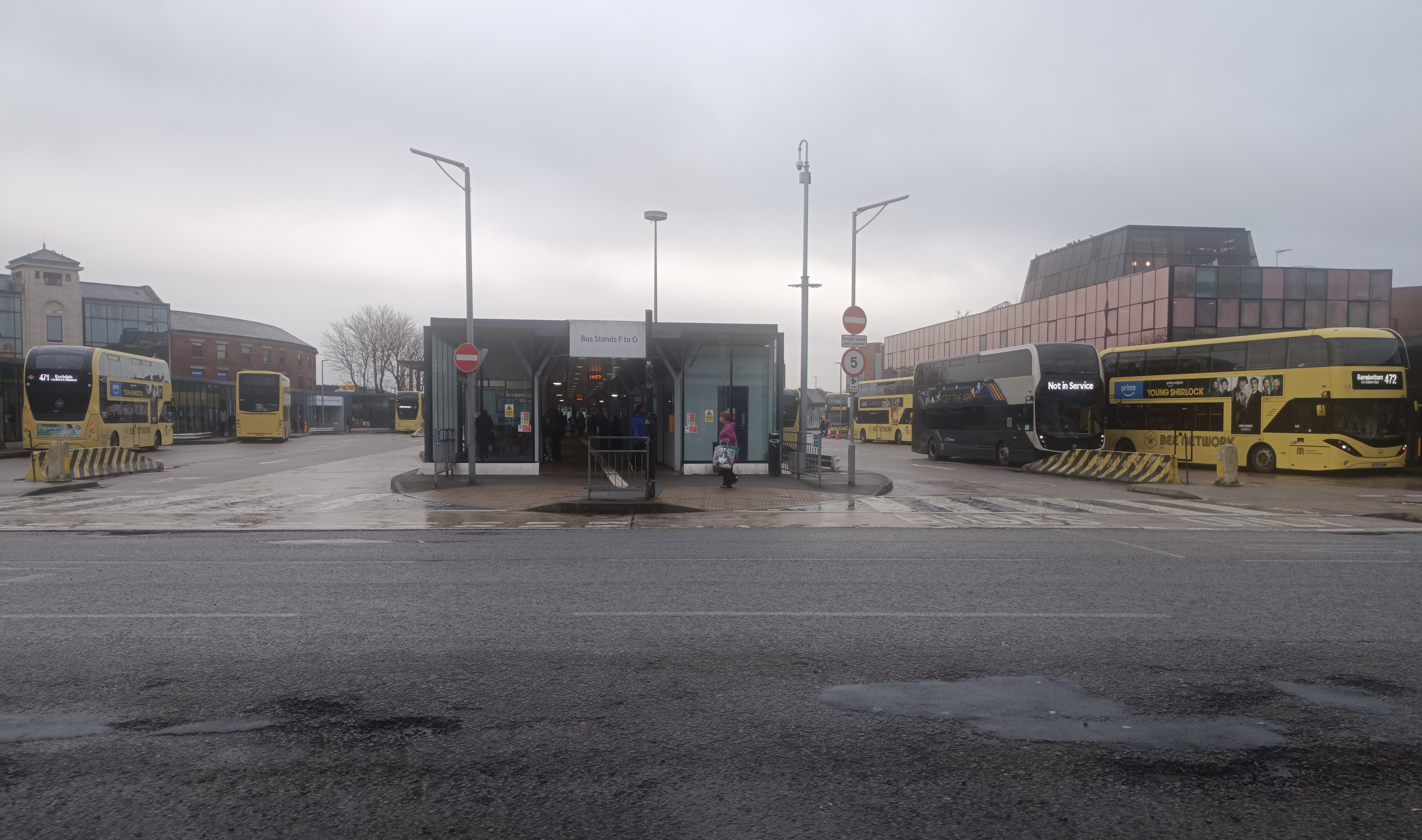
- A view of the bus stands, 2026

General information
- Location: Bury, Metropolitan Borough of Bury, England
- Coordinates: 53.5914°N 2.2970°W
- Grid reference: SD804105
- Manager: Bee Network
- Transit authority: Transport for Greater Manchester
- Bus routes: 94 95 97 98 135 163 433 467 468 469 471 472 474 475 477 480 481 483 487 511 512 513 524 TA02
- Bus stands: 20 (Arrivals, A-V except I, Q, U)
- Bus operators: Diamond Bus North West; First Manchester; Go North West; Stagecoach Manchester; Burnley Bus Company; Travel Assist

Other information
- Status: In operation

History
- Opened: 17 March 1980; 46 years ago
Route map
Location

Bury
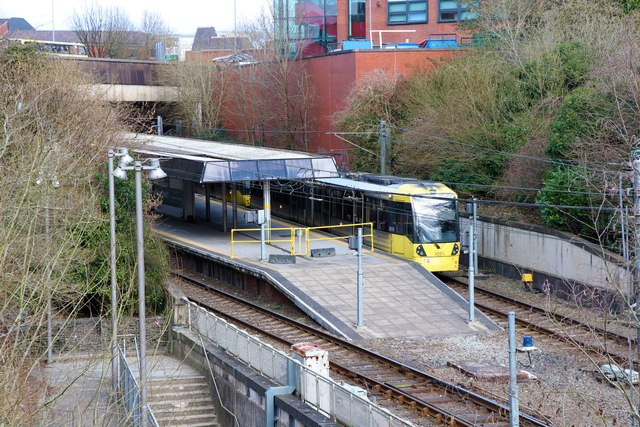

General information
- Location: Bury, Metropolitan Borough of Bury, England
- Coordinates: 53.51725°N 2.24102°W
- Grid reference: SD841023
- System: Manchester Metrolink
- Operator: KeolisAmey
- Transit authority: Transport for Greater Manchester
- Line: Bury Line
- Platforms: 2
- Tram routes

Construction
- Structure type: Below-grade
- Accessible: Yes

Other information
- Status: In operation
- Station code: BRY
- Fare zone: 4
- Website: Bury tram stop

History
- Opened: 6 April 1992; 34 years ago (Metrolink)

Key dates
- 17 March 1980: Opened as railway station
- 17 August 1991: Closed as railway station
- 6 April 1992: Opened as Metrolink stop
Route map
Location

Bury Interchange is a transport hub in the town of Bury, in Greater Manchester, England. It consists of a Metrolink tram stop, opened on 6 April 1992 after previously serving as a railway station from 1980 to 1991, and a bus station which was opened on 17 March 1980.

== History ==
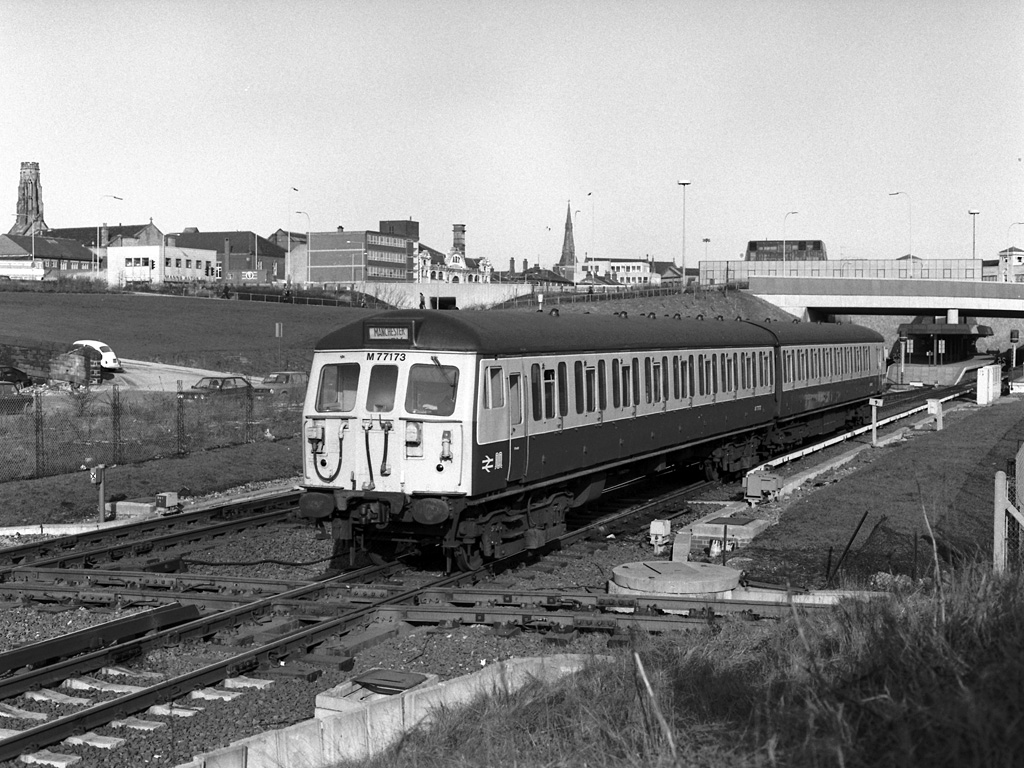
A Class 504 electric multiple unit leaving the station, looking north towards the station

=== Pre-1980 ===
Bury Bolton Street railway station was opened in 1846 on the Bury Line; it was the town's main station. It was closed by British Rail on 16 March 1980 and the terminus of the line was moved to Bury Interchange, where it linked up with a new transport interchange.

The new interchange railway station was part of the axed Picc-Vic tunnel project, as the northern terminus of a line that would run underground through Manchester city centre. The interchange was opened officially by Princess Alexandra on 9 July 1980.

Also nearby is the site of Bury Knowsley Street, which was sited south of the platforms where the current East Lancashire Railway heritage route runs to Heywood. This station was closed in 1970.

=== 1980-1991 ===
The interchange opened both a railway and a bus station on 17 March 1980; however, shortly afterwards, plans for a light rail scheme to replace the axed Picc-Vic project surfaced. The Bury Line, being an entirely local railway line was seriously considered for conversion to light rail. It was chosen for conversion as part of Phase 1 Metrolink.

Railway operations ended after 16 August 1991, in order for the line to be converted to Metrolink. Funding only allowed for minimum upgrades to be made and this meant it only took a few months to reopen to Metrolink.

Bury Bolton Street station was reopened in 1987, now operated by the heritage East Lancashire Railway, running lines north to Ramsbottom, later extended to Rawtenstall in 1991. It was lengthened further east to the present Calder Valley line via Heywood in 2003, which passes over the Metrolink on a bridge south of Bury tram stop's platforms.

=== 1992-present ===
Bury Interchange station was converted to Metrolink and opened on 6 April 1992; it was named just Bury. The interchange is managed by Transport for Greater Manchester and has been recently refurbished, improving facilities and security for passengers.

In 2011, the interchange underwent a small refurbishment.

There is a pedestrian subway running east-west just south of the Metrolink platforms leading to Pyramid Park; the subway was gated off and closed in around 2011. Steps down to the subway still exist. Pyramid Park is set to be redeveloped in the late 2020s and a new footbridge lifted into place over the tram lines replacing the closed subway. The subway tunnel itself will be filled in for this project. The footbridge will also provide access to the tram stop and the interchange as a whole from the south.

Only the northern 90 metres (98 yd) of the platform were actually refurbished for the Metrolink, though the entire 120 metres (130 yd) platform was regularly maintained. In around 2016, the full length of the platforms were refurbished and the signals, which once stood on the south part of the platforms themselves, were removed.

In March 2025, it was announced that the Bury Interchange redevelopment has been fast-tracked with £80 million to improve bus and tram connectivity across Greater Manchester.

== Layout ==
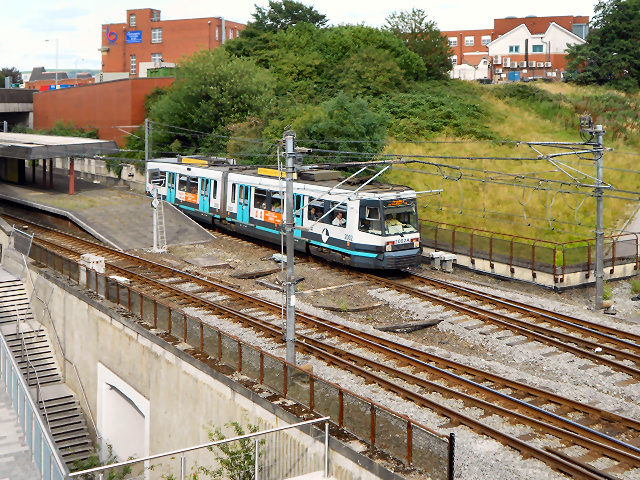
The crossovers south of Bury tram stop, with the still-open pedestrian subway visible

The bus station is at street-level and the tram stop is about 4 metres (4.4 yd) below street-level. The two connect via a short walkway and staircase down to the Metrolink; there is also a lift down to the platforms giving step-free access.

There is a park and ride site and a bicycle hub west of the tram stop at street-level.

=== Bus station ===
Bury Interchange's bus station has 20 stands, lettered from A to V and Arrivals, leaving out I, Q and U. There is an entrance and exit for buses on Haymarket Street and an additional exit onto Angouleme Way.

=== Metrolink tram stop ===
Bury tram stop has two island platforms, lettered A and B, reflecting the previous platform numbering used during British Rail operation, which used 1 and 2 respectively. The entire tram stop is covered by a canopy extending across the platforms.

Two double-sided dot matrix passenger information displays stand serving one platform each; they show estimated arrival times for trams and the number of carriages.

== Services ==
=== Buses ===
The majority of routes from Bury Interchange are operated by Stagecoach Manchester and Go North West, on behalf of Transport for Greater Manchester, under the Bee Network brand. Diamond Bus North West and First Greater Manchester also operate some services; a couple of cross-boundary routes are operated to Blackburn and Burnley, which are run by Burnley Bus Company. As of July 2026, 24 different Bee Network bus routes run through Bury Interchange, plus school services.

Former operators include Ribble Motor Services, Crosville Motor Services, Yelloway Motor Services, Bee Line Buzz Company, Burnley & Pendle, Bolton Coachways, Mayne Coaches, Citibus Tours, Shearings, Blue Bus & Coach Services, Maytree Travel, Bu-Val Buses and JPT.

=== Metrolink ===
Every route across the Manchester Metrolink network operates to a 12-minute headway (5 tph) Monday–Saturday, with a 15-minute headway (4 tph) on Sundays and bank holidays. Sections served by a second peak-only route, including Bury, have a combined headway of 6 minutes during peak times.

Bury is located in Zone 4 and the stop itself has three platforms. Trams towards Piccadilly and an extra services runs direct to Altrincham Interchange, via Market Street during peak times. Services depart from either platform.

Preceding station	Manchester Metrolink	Following station
Radcliffe towards Piccadilly	Piccadilly–Bury	Terminus
Radcliffe towards Altrincham	Altrincham–Bury (peak only)	Terminus
Proposed
Elton Reservoir towards Piccadilly	Piccadilly–Bury	Terminus
Elton Reservoir towards Altrincham	Altrincham–Bury (peak only)	Terminus
