= Beeston transport interchange =

Tram and bus interchange in Nottinghamshire, England

Beeston Transport Interchange
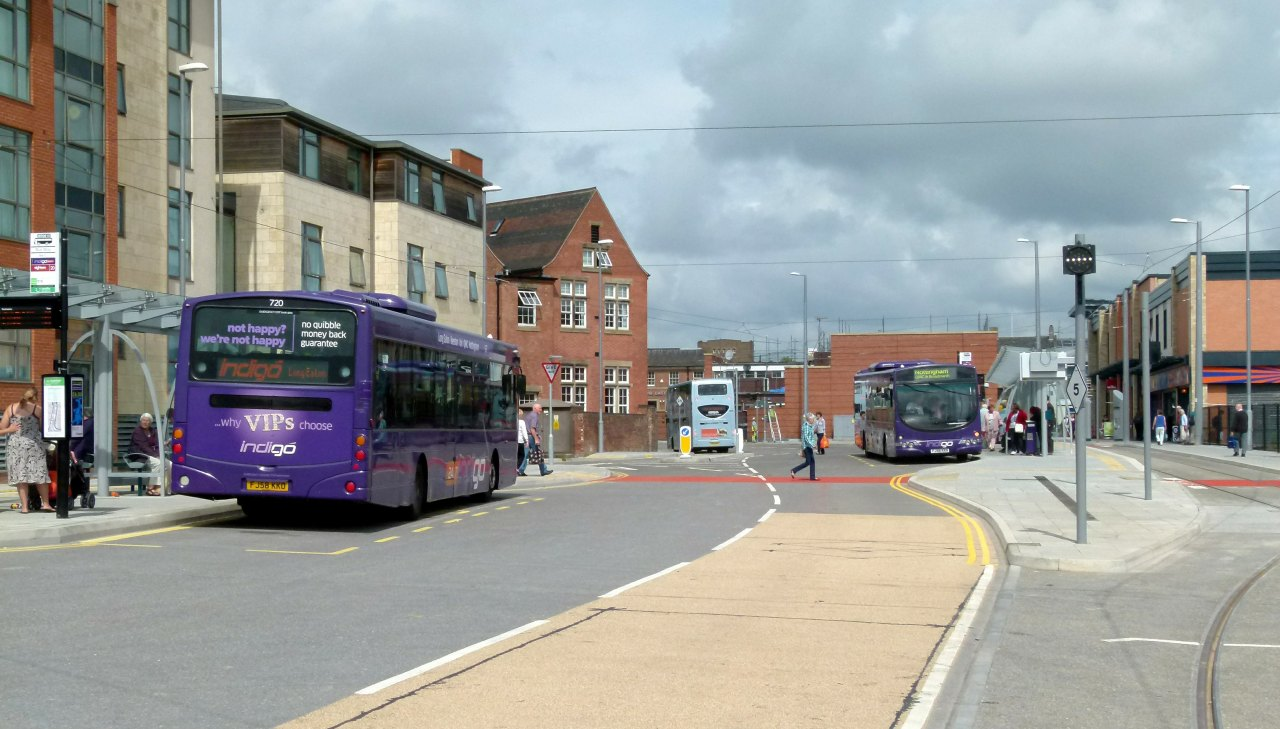
- The interchange looking north-west

General information
- Location: Beeston; Nottinghamshire; England
- Coordinates: 52°55′31″N 1°12′53″W
- System: Bus and tram interchange
- Owner: Nottingham Express Transit
- Operator: Nottingham Express Transit
- Line: 1
- Platforms: 2
- Tracks: 2
- Bus stands: 6

Construction
- Structure type: At grade; in street
- Accessible: Step-free access to platform

Key dates
- 12 July 2015: Opened (bus)
- 25 August 2015: Opened (tram)

Services
Preceding station	NET	Following station
Middle Street towards Hucknall	Line 1	Chilwell Road towards Toton Lane
Location
- Location within Nottinghamshire

The Beeston transport interchange, also known as Beeston Centre tram stop, is an interchange between the trams of the Nottingham Express Transit (NET) network and local buses. It is in the centre of the town of Beeston in Nottinghamshire, England. The interchange is some 750 metres (0.5 mi) north-west of Beeston railway station.

The interchange is built on the site of Styring Street and an adjacent multi-storey car park, which was demolished before construction began. It is modelled on a successful design used on the Strasbourg tram system in France, and comprises two staggered island platforms. Trams serve the outer faces of the platforms, using their off-side doors, whilst the inner faces each provide three bus stands that are served by local bus services. An elongated facing crossover allows outbound trams to terminate in the inbound platform. Vehicular access to the interchange is restricted to buses and trams.

The interchange opened to buses on 12 July 2015 and has replaced the previous Beeston bus station, which was situated nearby. The tram stop within the interchange opened on 25 August 2015, along with the rest of NET's phase two.

== Tram services ==
The stop is on line 1 of the NET, from Hucknall via Nottingham city centre to Beeston and on to Chilwell, and is shown as Beeston Town Centre on NET publicity. Trams run at frequencies that vary between 4 and 8 trams per hour, depending on the day and time of day.

== Bus services ==
The interchange is served by the following day time bus routes:

#	Route	Operator	Source
18	Stapleford - Bramcote - Beeston - Rylands - Queen's Medical Centre - Nottingham	CT4N	
18a	Wollaton - Beeston - Rylands - Queen's Medical Centre - Nottingham	CT4N	
36	Chilwell - Beeston - Lenton Abbey - Queen's Medical Centre - Nottingham	Nottingham City Transport	
510	Beeston - Toton - Stapleford	Nottinghamshire County Council	
536	Beeston - Bramcote Avenue - Chilwell - Toton	Nottinghamshire County Council	
indigo	(Derby) - Long Eaton - Beeston - Queen's Medical Centre - Nottingham	trentbarton	

== Gallery ==
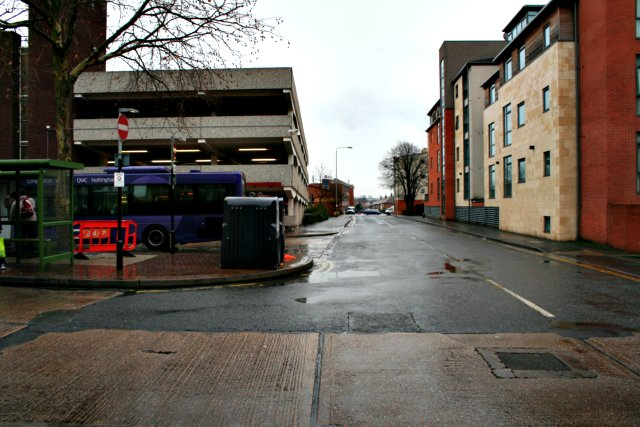
Styring Street, the site of the interchange, before demolition and construction

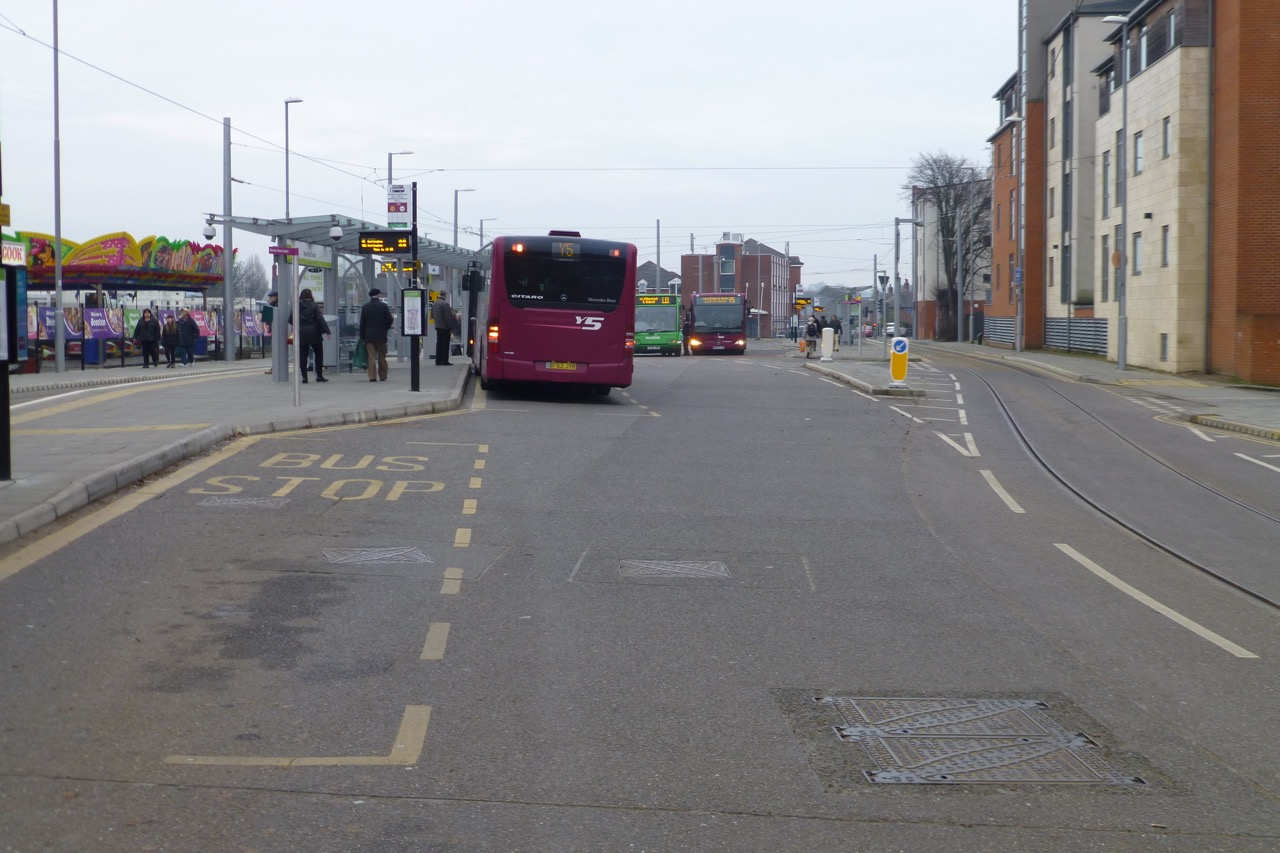
The site of Styring Street, with the completed interchange (compare with previous image)

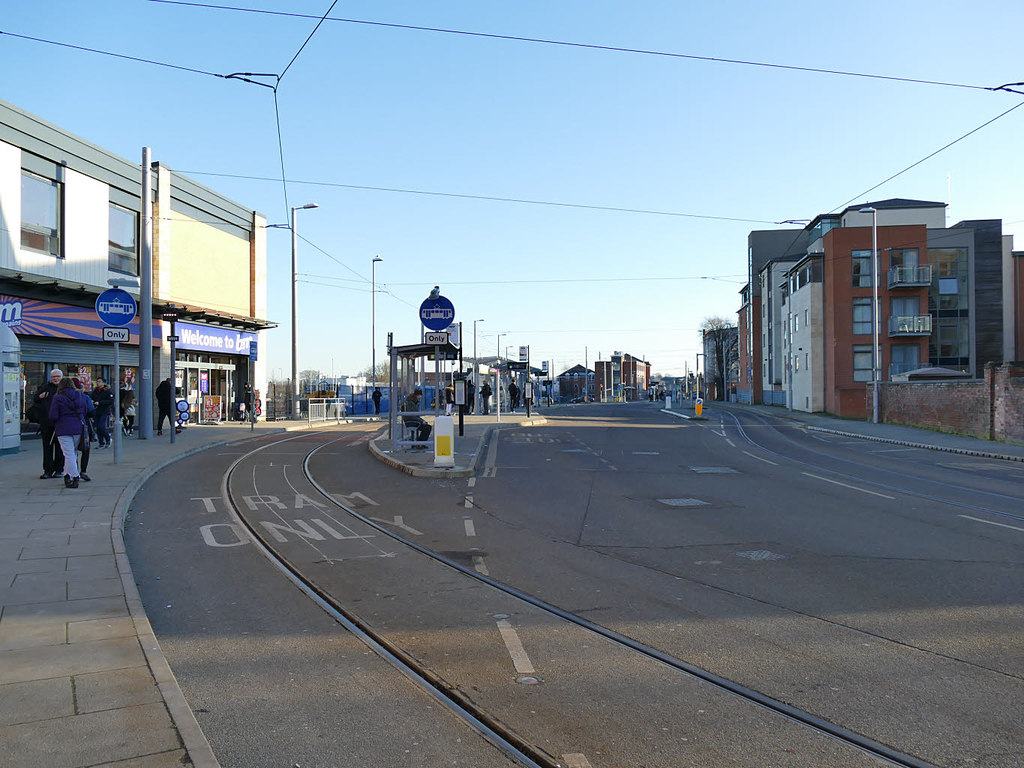
Looking south-east, showing tram stops on the outside and bus stops on the inside
