= Todmorden bus station =

Bus station in West Yorkshire, England

Todmorden
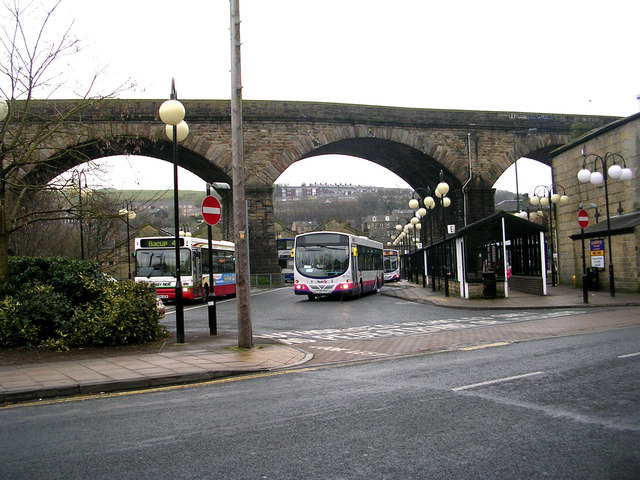

General information
- Location: Burnley Road, Todmorden; Calderdale
- Coordinates: 53.715°N 2.097°W
- Operator: West Yorkshire Metro
- Bus routes: 10 (Autumn 2023)
- Bus stands: 5
- Bus operators: First West Yorkshire; Rosso; TLC Travel
- Connections: Todmorden railway station (330 yards [300 m])

Construction
- Accessible: Yes

Other information
- Fare zone: Zone 5 of METRO rail zone.

History
- Opened: 1997
Location

Todmorden bus station serves the town of Todmorden, West Yorkshire, England. The bus station is owned and managed by West Yorkshire Metro and was opened during 1997. The bus situated in the town centre, next to the Todmorden Market. The bus station can be accessed from Burnley Road below the rail viaduct.

The station consists of five stands, and is used by First West Yorkshire, TLC Travel and Rosso who operate services to areas around Todmorden and to the towns of Bacup, Burnley, Halifax, Hebden Bridge, Littleborough, Rawtenstall, Rochdale and Walsden. TLC Travel operate the local minibuses as of 26 January 2014.

The former Borough of Todmorden was only the second municipality in the British Isles to run motor buses, the service having commenced on 1 January 1907.
