= Bretonside bus station =

Former bus station in Plymouth, England

Bretonside
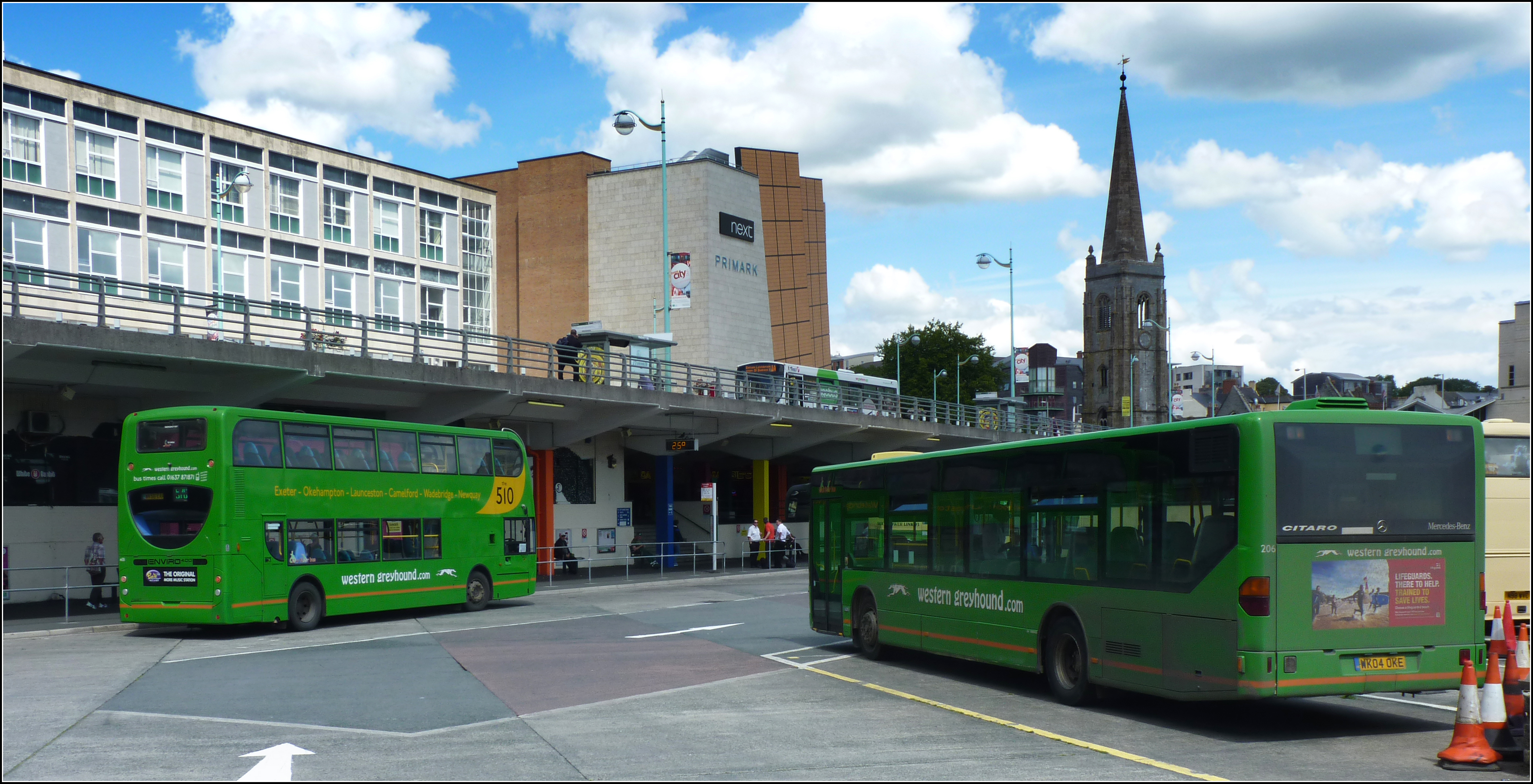

General information
- Location: Plymouth; England
- Coordinates: 50°22′14.6″N 4°8′13.31″W
- System: Bus station

History
- Opened: March 1958
- Closed: 2016
Location

The Bretonside bus station was a bus station in Plymouth, Devon, England.

== History ==
The bus station opened in March 1958. In 2014, plans were put forward to redevelop the site of the bus station. In March 2015, the local planning committee agreed to demolish the bus station. Long-distance coach services were transferred to Plymouth coach station. Demolition began in October 2017.

== Reception ==
The station was noted for its lack of cleanliness and upkeep.
