= Worswick Street bus station =

Former bus station in Newcastle upon Tyne, England

General information
- Location: Worswick Street; Newcastle upon Tyne; England
- Coordinates: 54.97292°N 1.60889°W

History
- Opened: circa 1928
- Closed: 1996
Location

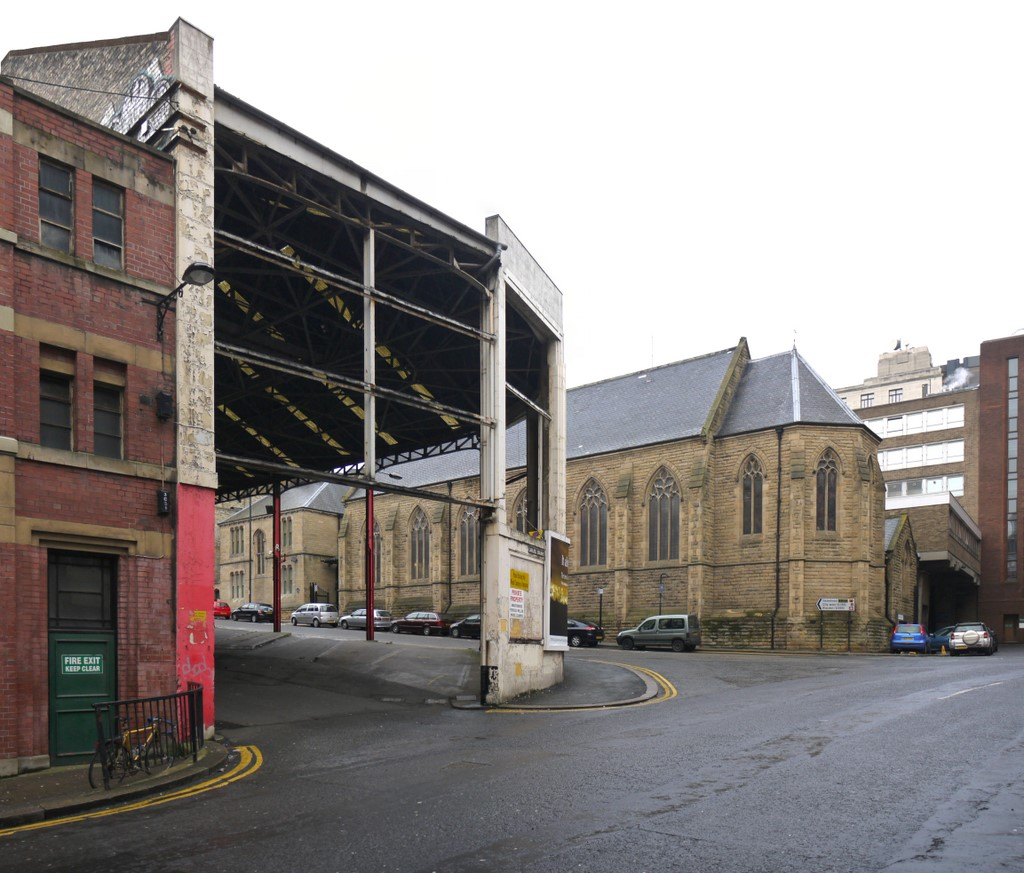
The remains of the bus station in 2010

Worswick Street bus station was a bus station in Newcastle upon Tyne, England.

The bus station was constructed on a slope.

== History ==
The Tyne Bridge was opened in 1928 and allowed many bus services that formerly terminated in Gateshead to continue across the Tyne to Newcastle. Worswick Street bus station was opened with the bridge, or shortly after.

The bus station closed in 1996. It was temporarily used as a car park. Demolition of the disused bus station began in January 2021. In July 2021, plans for an office block on the space previously occupied by the bus station and an adjacent car park were approved by Newcastle City Council.
