= Retford bus station =

Bus station in Nottinghamshire, England

Retford
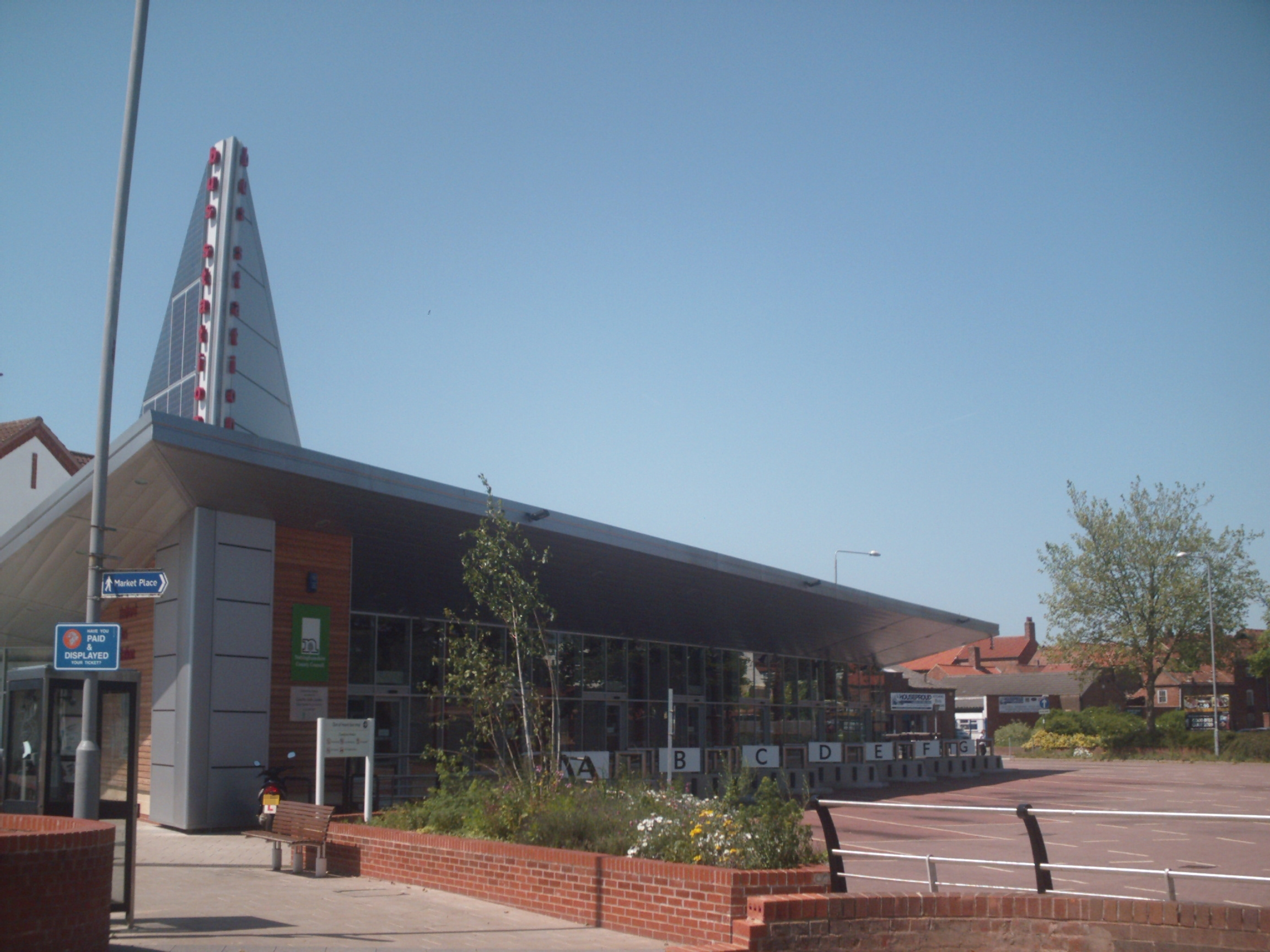

General information
- Location: Beardsall's Row, Retford; Bassetlaw
- Coordinates: 53.3214°N 0.9400°W
- Operator: Nottinghamshire County Council
- Bus stands: 8
- Bus operators: Stagecoach in Bassetlaw, Stagecoach in Lincolnshire, TM Travel, Marshalls Coaches, Kettlewells Coaches
- Connections: Retford railway station (900 metres)

History
- Opened: 30 July 2007

Passengers
- 562,500
Location

Retford bus station serves the town of Retford, Nottinghamshire, England. It is managed by Nottinghamshire County Council.

The bus station, of eight stands numbered alphabetically, is situated on Beardsall's Row, between Arlington Way and Spa Road in the town centre.

The main operators at the bus station are Stagecoach in Bassetlaw, Stagecoach in Lincolnshire and TM Travel.

The bus station was rebuilt by Nottinghamshire County Council at a cost of £1.5 million to replace the previous collection of bus shelters. It opened on 30 July 2007. It was built as a fully enclosed building, with CCTV coverage and improved pedestrian access to the town centre. The bus station incorporates a solar panelled tower and a stained glass window.

Prior to 2007, the bus station was first constructed as an open area laid circa 1978 to replace the previous bus stands in Chapelgate. It was a simple open plaza with a raised bed in the centre, and simple bus shelters around the edge.

Buses go from the bus station around the town and as far afield as Worksop, Doncaster, Gainsborough, Lincolnshire, Newark-on-Trent and Nottingham.

Local company Kettlewells Coaches also run the weekly Doncaster Shopper and Lincoln Shopper services from the bus station.
