= MetroCentre Interchange =

Metrocentre Interchange
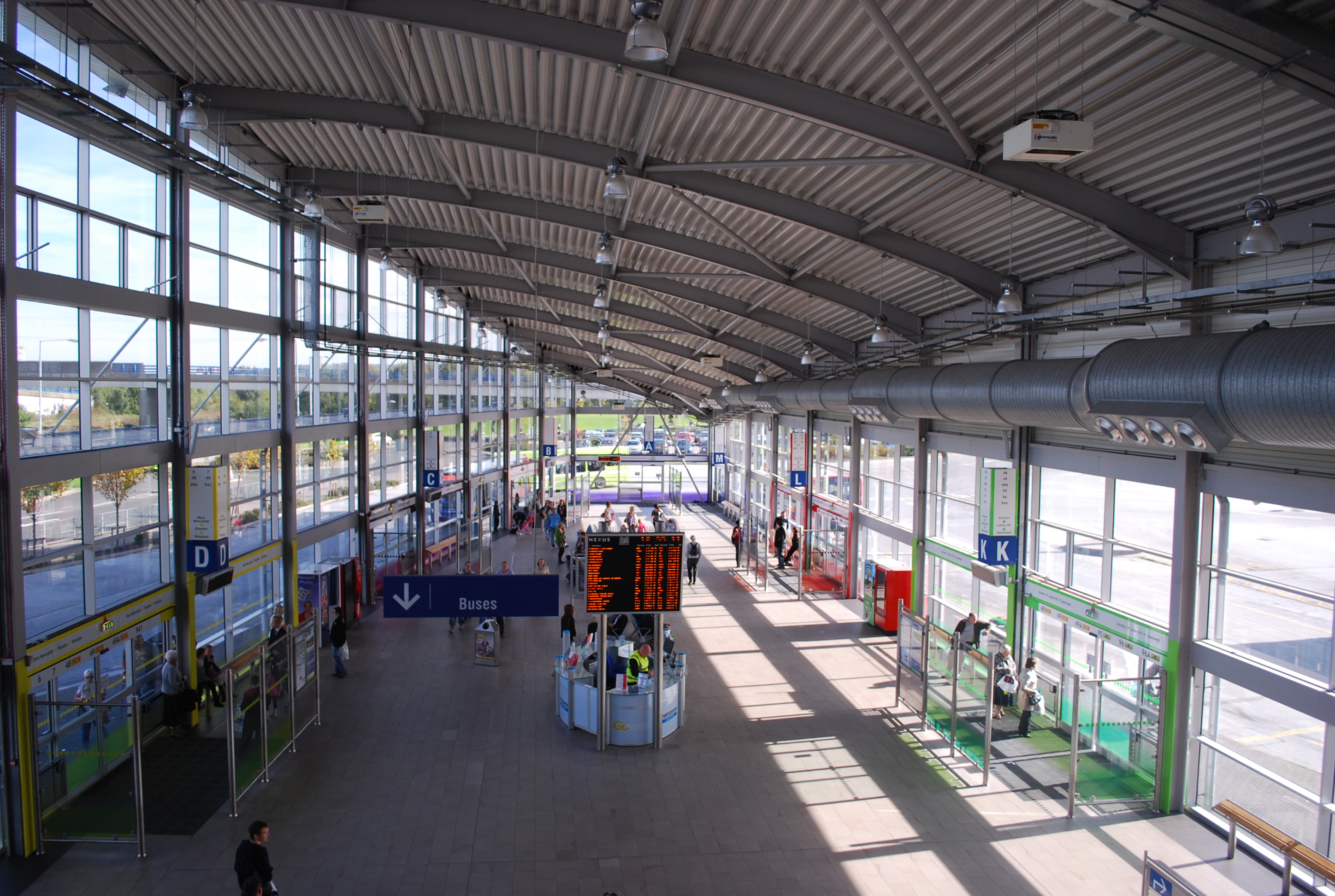

General information
- Location: Scotswood View; Metrocentre; Gateshead
- Coordinates: 54.9581°N 1.6654°W
- Owner: Intu Properties
- Operator: Go North East; Tyne and Wear PTE (Nexus)
- Bus stands: 12
- Connections: MetroCentre

Other information
- Fare zone: Network One: 2; Transfare: Green

History
- Opened: 6 October 2004
Location
- Location within Tyne and Wear

Metrocentre Interchange serves the Metrocentre in Gateshead. The bus station was originally constructed in the late 1980s, opened in 1987. In the early 2000s, the former bus station was demolished, with the current bus station opened in October 2004.

A footbridge connects Metrocentre Interchange with the railway station and coach park. Rail services from the station are operated by Northern Trains.

== Bus services ==
Metrocentre Interchange is served by Go North East and Stagecoach in Newcastle's bus services, with frequent routes running in and around Gateshead and Newcastle upon Tyne, as well as County Durham, North Tyneside and Northumberland. The bus station has 12 departure stands (lettered A–M), each of which is fitted with seating, next bus information displays, and timetable posters.

== See also ==
- Metrocentre
