= Exeter bus station =

Bus station in Devon, England

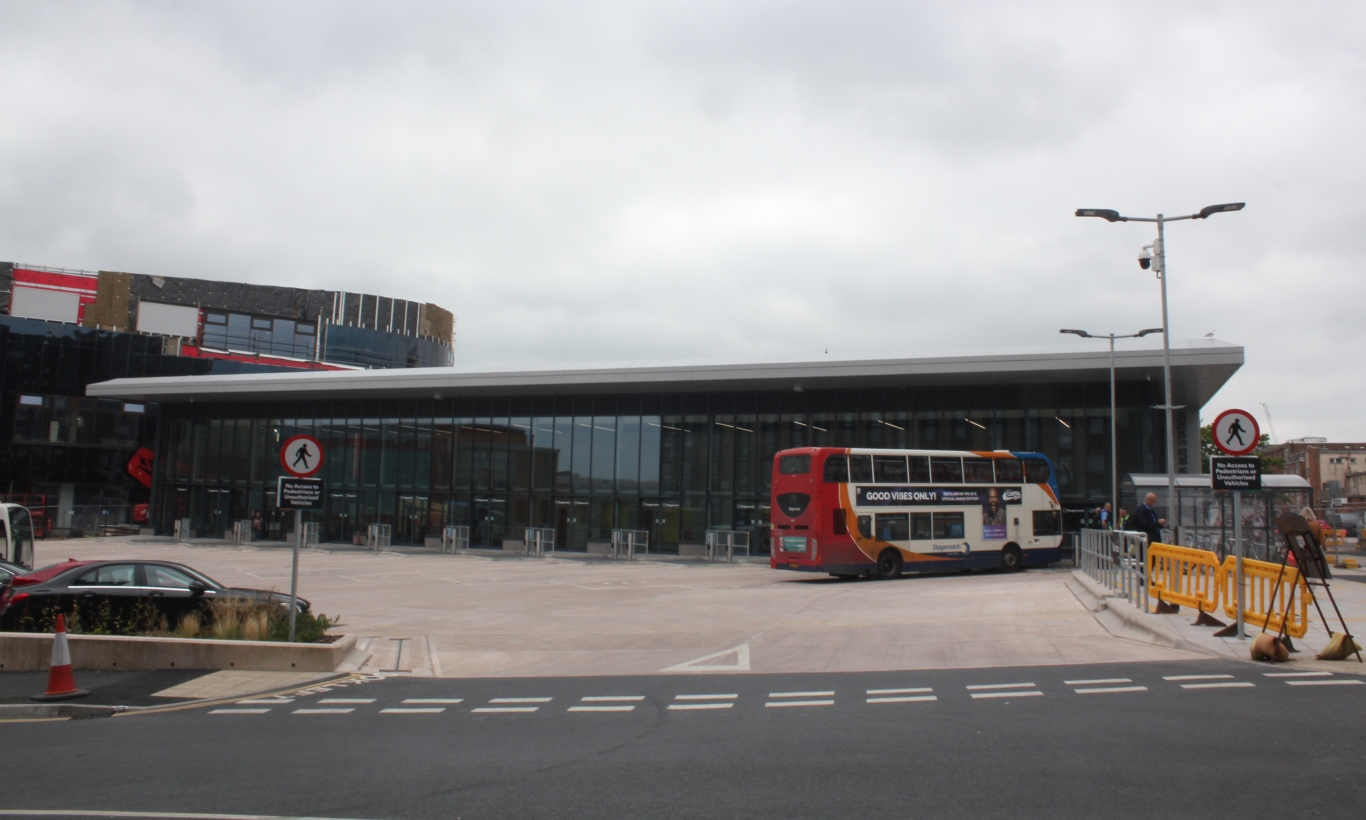
- The new bus station in 2021

General information
- Location: Bampfylde Street, EX1 2FX; Exeter; UK
- Coordinates: 50.72616°N 3.52406°W
- System: Bus station
- Operator: Stagecoach South West
- Bus stands: 12
- Bus operators: Stagecoach South West

Construction
- Parking: 3 disabled spaces
- Cycle facilities: Racks
- Accessible: Level boarding

Other information
- Status: In use

History
- Opened: 5 July 1964 (old bus station); 25 July 2021 (new bus station)
- Closed: 25 July 2021 (old bus station)
Location

Exeter bus station is a bus station in the English city of Exeter. The original station opened in 1964 and was replaced by the new station in 2021 on the same site.

== History ==
The previous bus station opened on a site in Paris Street on 5 July 1964, replacing an earlier bus station on Paul Street which became a car park.

Construction of a new bus station on part of the existing site started in January 2019. The construction was funded by Exeter City Council. The development also included a leisure centre called St Sidwell's Point. The project had been intended to start construction in December 2018, but was delayed. Part of the former bus station remained open during construction, but some services had to call on nearby streets instead.

The new bus station opened on 25 July 2021.

== Facilities ==
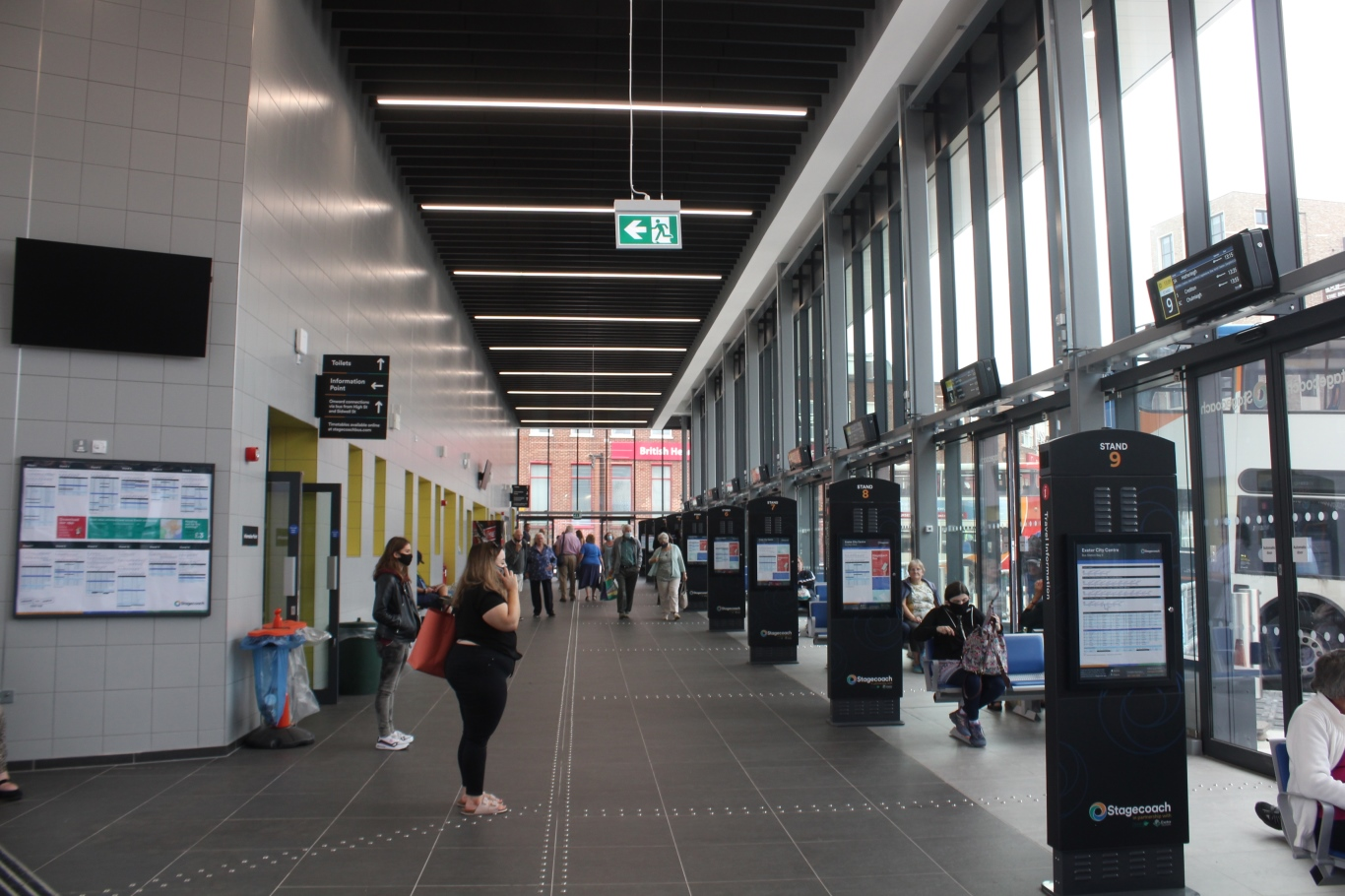
Station concourse in 2021

The bus station has a fully enclosed indoor waiting area with 12 stands. Each stand has automatic doors, seats and a display showing real time information accompanied by audio announcements and an in-person information point where passengers can acsess printed timetables of the bus services. Other facilities include cycle racks, disabled car parking spaces and public toilets.

== Archaeology ==
In 2019, during redevelopment of the bus station, remains of a Roman fort were discovered.

== Services ==
Bus services in and out of Exeter bus station are as follows:

Route	Destination
1/1A	Cullompton & Tiverton via Broadclyst
2	Newton Abbot via Teignmouth & Dawlish
5	Crediton via Newton St Cyres
5A	Okehampton via North Tawton
5B	Barnstaple via Great Torrington & Bideford
5C	Chulmleigh via Lapford
7	Totnes via Newton Abbot & Ipplepen
9	Honiton via Sidmouth
9A	Seaton via Sidmouth
X30	Seaton via Honiton
38	Ivybridge via Bovey Tracey, where certain journeys continue to Newton Abbot as route 39 instead of Ivybridge
44	Honiton via Ottery St Mary
44A	Axminster via Honiton
55	Tiverton via Stoke Canon
355	Tiverton via Thorverton & Silverton
57	Exmouth via Topsham & Lympstone. Certain journeys continue to Brixington as route 99
58	Exmouth via Woodbury
66	Okehampton via Whiddon Down.
358	Otterton via Budleigh Salterton

Most routes above are operated by Stagecoach South West with service 66 operated by Dartline.
