= Beeston bus station =

Former bus station in Beeston, Nottinghamshire, England

Beeston
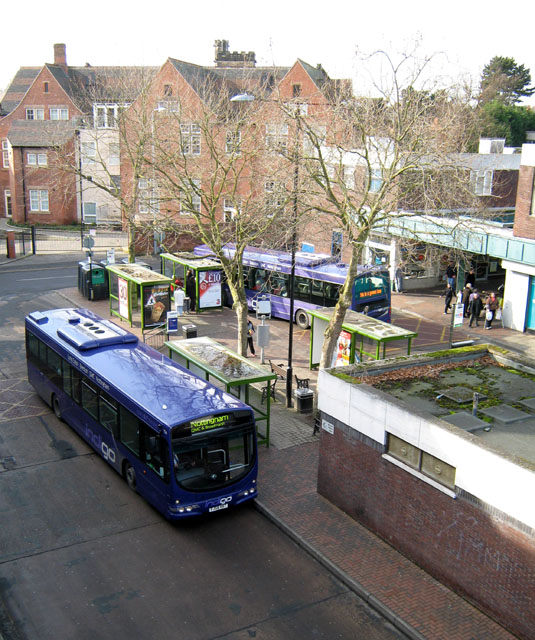

General information
- Location: Beeston; Broxtowe
- Coordinates: 52.926°N 1.2145°W
- Operator: Nottinghamshire
- Bus stands: 8
- Bus operators: Nottingham City Transport, Trent Barton, Nottsbus, YourBus
- Connections: Beeston railway station

History
- Closed: 12 July 2015
Location

Beeston bus station was a former bus station that served the town of Beeston, in the English county of Nottinghamshire. It was closed on 12 July 2015, when it was superseded by the nearby Beeston transport interchange, which includes services on the newly opened Nottingham Express Transit line 1 between Nottingham and Chilwell, as well as the bus routes that previously used the bus station.

The bus station was in the town centre just off Station Road and consisted of six stands in total. The main operator's using the bus station were Nottingham City Transport, Trent Barton, Premiere Travel and YourBus. The bus station was at the heart of the town and over recent years Nottinghamshire County Council funds were spent upgrading the site.
