= Newark bus station =

Bus station in Newark-on-Trent, England

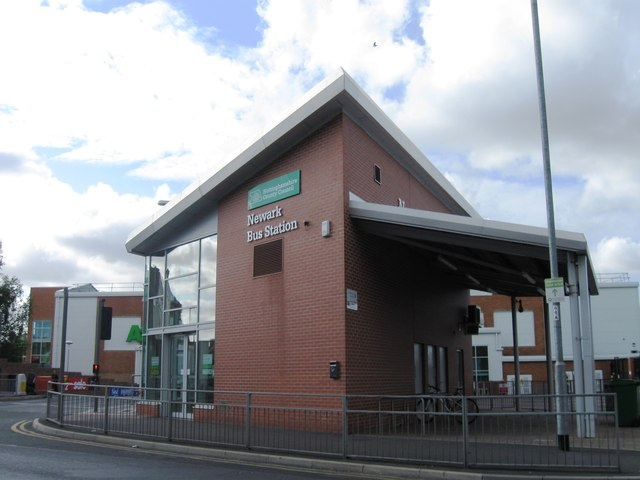
- The present bus station

General information
- Location: Newark-on-Trent; England
- Coordinates: 53°4′29.78″N 0°48′45.44″W
Location

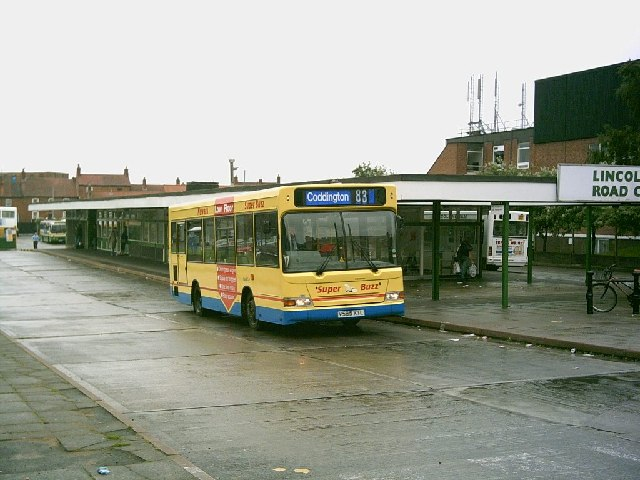
The bus station in 2005

Newark bus station is a bus station in Newark-on-Trent, England.

== History ==
In July 2004, plans were announced to redevelop the Potterdyke area, which included the rebuilding of the bus station.

In 2006, the bus station was threatened with closure as Stagecoach East Midlands did not wish to spend money on necessary repairs. In response, the two local councils began funding its maintenance, stated to be around £30,000 to £40,000 per year while Stagecoach continued to operate it. The councils at the time stated that they were planning to identify a new location for the bus station.

A planning application was submitted for a new bus station in The Wharf area in 2007. The new site was closer to the town centre and near Newark Castle railway station. However, a petition was launched against the building of the new bus station with opponents claiming it would spoil the view in the area. In June 2008, the developers announced in response that it would keep the bus station at its existing site.

The former bus station was closed in May 2010 for redevelopment. The rebuilt bus station was opened on 11 November 2011.

== Facilities ==
The bus station has five bays, cycle parking, vending machines, and screens detailing bus departure times.
