= Radcliffe bus station =

Bus station in Radcliffe, Greater Manchester, England

Coordinates: 53°33′29″N 2°19′34″W

Radcliffe bus Station
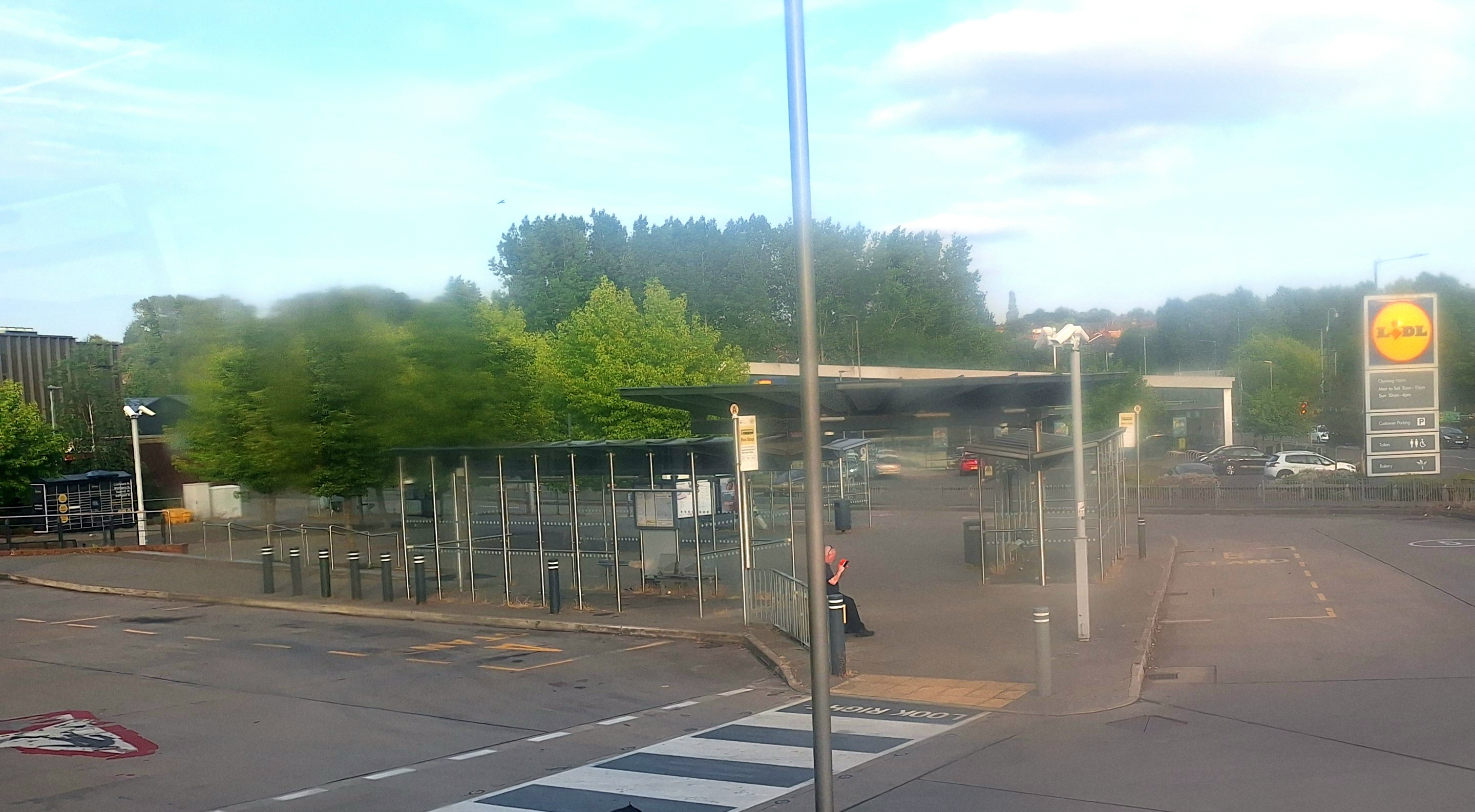
- The bus station in July 2026

General information
- Location: Radcliffe, Greater Manchester
- Operator: Bee Network
- Bus routes: 98 512 513 524
- Bus stands: 4
- Bus operators: Vision Bus, Go North West, Diamond North West, Stagecoach Manchester

Other information
- Website: TfGM.com
Location

Radcliffe bus station is a bus station in Radcliffe, Greater Manchester and, in its previous form, opened in April 1984. It was situated on Dale Street in Radcliffe.

The newly constructed Radcliffe bus station is situated at the junction of the A665 (Pilkington Road) and Dale street, Radcliffe.

== Present ==
In December 2015 the new bus station was built and opened on its new site, behind the General Post office, following plans for Radcliffe's regeneration as outlined by Bury Council.

As of March 2024, The station is now operated by the Bee Network (TfGM) after the recent expanding of the Bee Network.

== Services ==
Services are run by the Bee Network through the operators: Go North West, Diamond North West and Stagecoach Manchester. The new station has four stands, A, B, C and D.

The services are:

98 to Bury and Manchester, Stands B and D.

512 to Bury and Farnworth, Stands A and D.

513 to Bury and Farnworth, Stands A and D.

524 to Bury and Bolton, Stands C and A.

Additionally, there are three school services:

886 to Tottington High School from Redvales.

890 to Unsworth Academy from Bradley Fold.

896 to Elton High School.

== Future ==
Due to plans from Bury Council to regenerate Radcliffe Town Center, the new bus station will be joined by new shops and other amenities. The completed regeneration plan was scheduled for completion in 2016. However due to unknown delays no new building work has started as of 16 June 2018.

In 2024, Bury Council's new Radcliffe Hub's construction has begun and is expected to be completed by 2026.
