= Bu-Val Buses =

British bus operating company

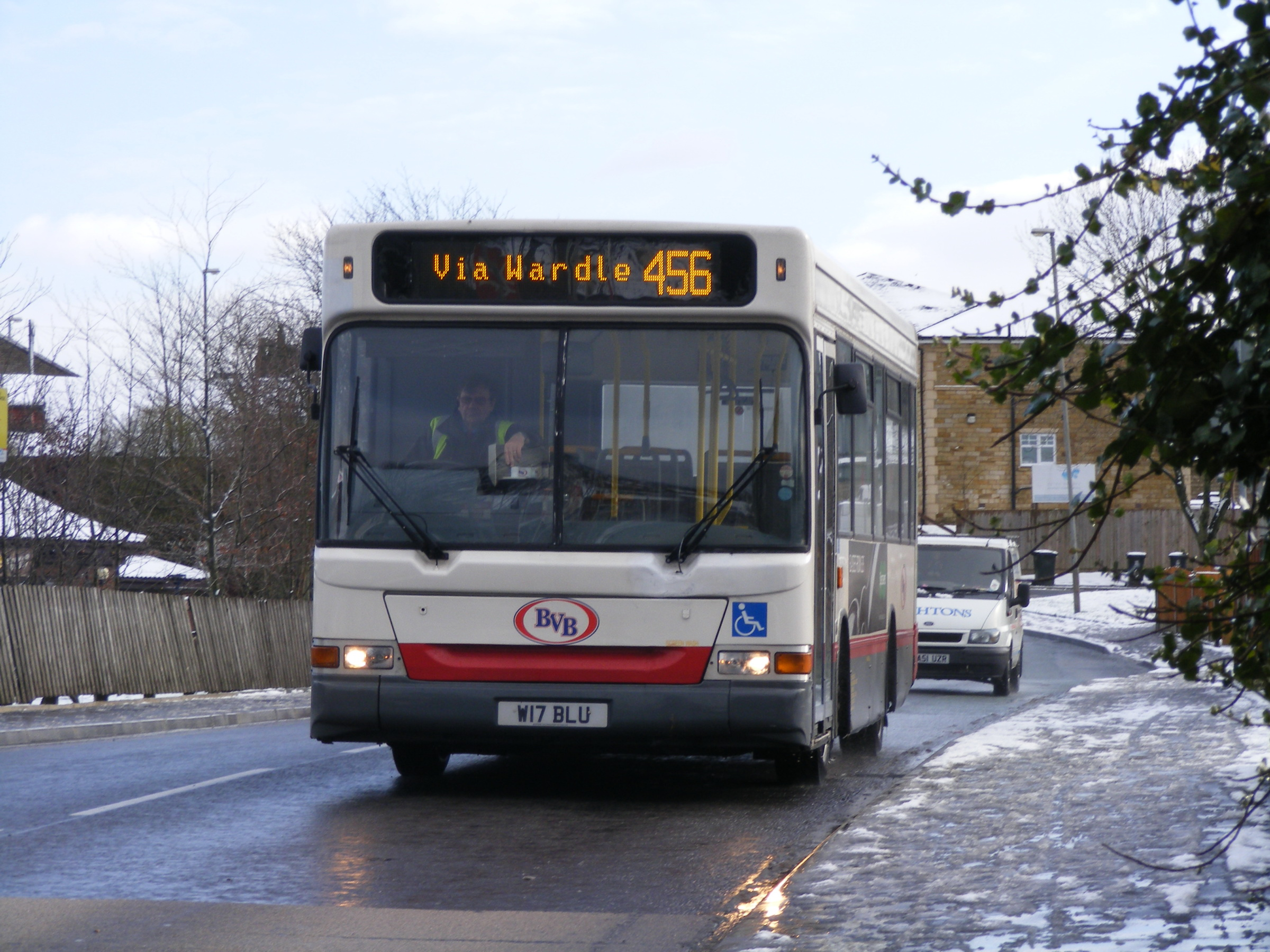
- Bu-Val Buses W17 BLU at Smithy Bridge.
- Founded: 1990
- Defunct: 2011
- Headquarters: Unit 5, Paragon Industrial Estate, Smithybridge Road, Littleborough, Greater Manchester, OL15 8QF9
- Locale: North West
- Service area: Greater Manchester
- Service type: bus service
- Hubs: Rochdale, Manchester, Oldham, Salford
- Website: Official Website

Bu-Val Buses was an independent bus operator, situated in Littleborough, Greater Manchester. The company started operations in 1990 and provided a number of local services in the Greater Manchester area, originally in the Rochdale and Littleborough areas, before expanding out to the Bury, Manchester, Oldham, Saddleworth, Salford and Tameside areas. In February 2011, the company started a free night bus service running into Rochdale town centre from surrounding areas. The service runs along three routes. The service started in Bacup via Whitworth to Rochdale before heading to Littleborough via Milnrow and Newhey into the town centre and then heading to Heywood and running to Middleton and Castleton and back into town. In May 2011, only a few weeks after winning new contracts on evening and Sunday services in the Rochdale area, it was announced that the company had ceased trading following failure to operate services.
