= North Gate bus station =

Bus station which serves the town of Northampton in England

North Gate
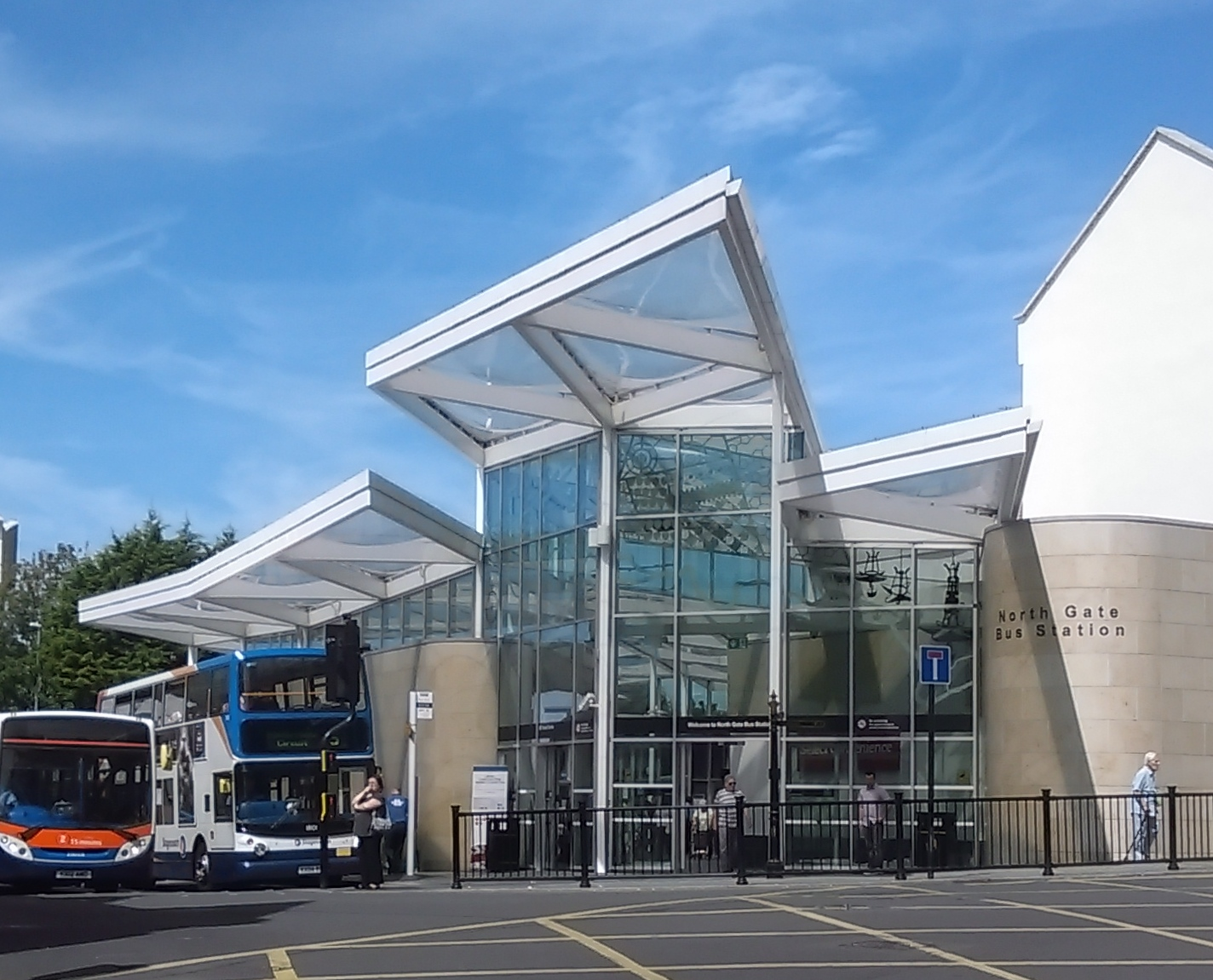
- Front entrance of the bus station

General information
- Location: Bradshaw Street, Northampton, NN1 2HL; Northampton
- Coordinates: 52.2387°N 0.8985°W
- Bus stands: 14
- Bus operators: Stagecoach, Uno
- Connections: Northampton railway station (885 metres)

History
- Opened: 2 March 2014; 12 years ago
Location

North Gate bus station is the bus station which serves the town of Northampton in England. Northampton railway station is approximately 0.9 km away.

The building on Bradshaw Street opened on 2 March 2014 on the site of the town's former Fishmarket. The new station was built to replace the previous Greyfriars bus station, which dated from 1976.

== History ==
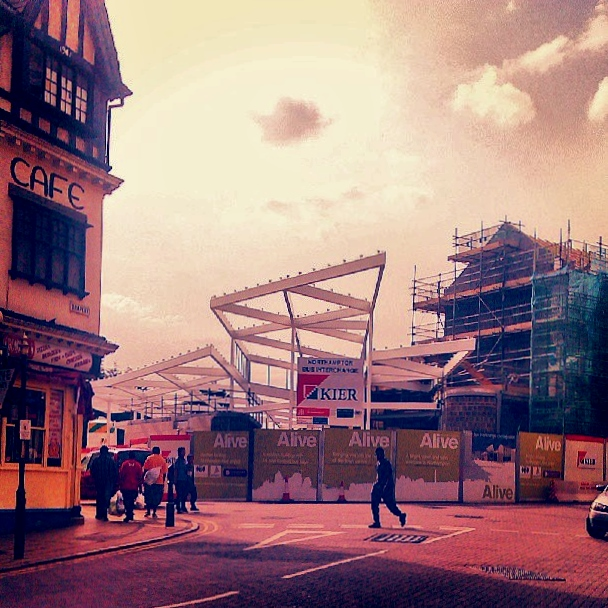
The station under construction in July 2013

Planning permission for the £7 million project to create a new bus interchange in Northampton was granted in August 2012. Demolition work on the former Fishmarket building began in December 2012, so that work could start on the new bus interchange. The Fishmarket was completely demolished by March 2013.

The framework of the new station began to be erected in May 2013. Work started in June on improving the streets around the new station, with new paving slabs, bus shelters and road surfaces. New traffic lights and a pedestrian crossing linking the bus station with the Market Square were also installed. A topping-out ceremony was held on 17 September 2013.

Artwork telling the history of Northampton and the site was put up in the station in early February 2014. An open day was held on 1 March 2014, ahead of its official opening the following day.

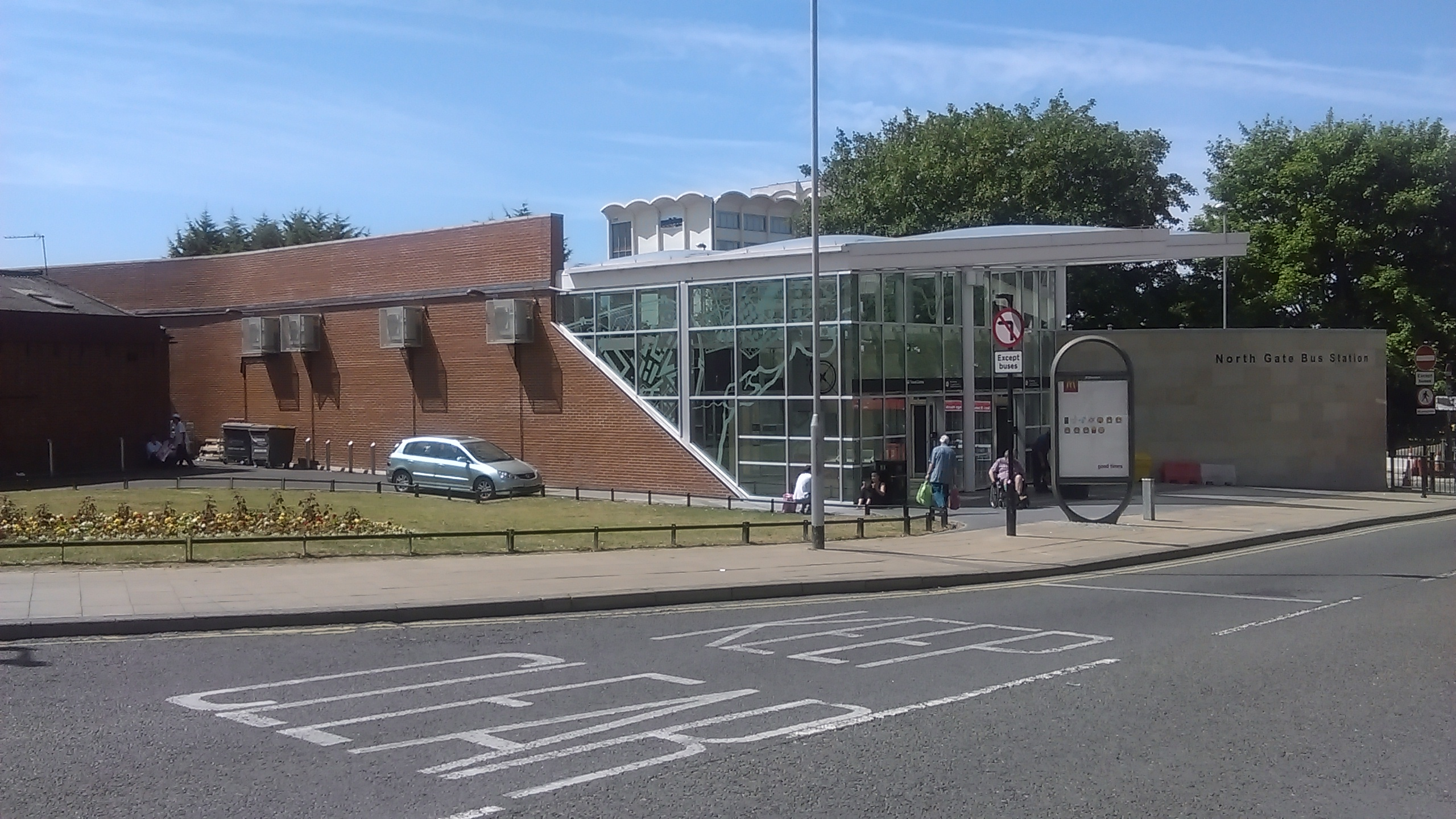
The back entrance of North Gate bus station

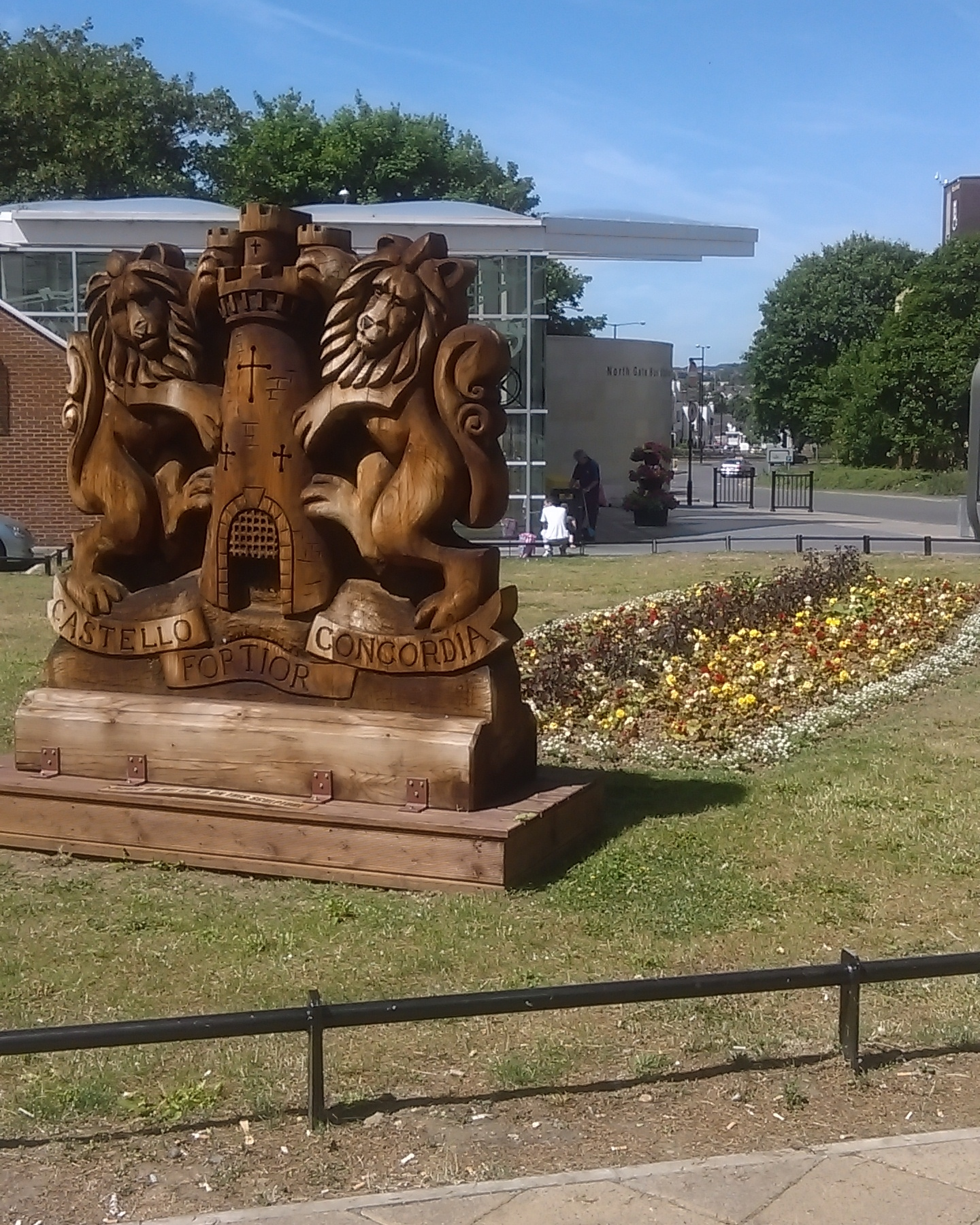
A wooden sculpture of the Northampton Borough crest was erected outside the bus station

Substantial difficulties were experienced on the first full day of operations. Traffic passing through Northampton town centre saw delays of over an hour, with many bus services being cancelled. Northamptonshire Police were forced to close some roads in the town centre to traffic other than buses. The authorities blamed a sudden increase in traffic around the station, along with the phasing of pedestrian lights, bus driver training, and private vehicles using the Drapery illegally (the Drapery is only open to buses, taxis and unloading vehicles). Emergency measures, including a new box junction and temporary pedestrian barriers, were put in place overnight to keep the same problem from happening the following day.

On the first working day of operation, unprecedented traffic congestion occurred, causing gridlock for several hours. Emergency work to mark surrounding junctions and erect temporary pedestrian barriers was carried out to try to ease the problems. Later, access to College Street was restricted and access to the Park Inn Hotel was altered. Similar incidents, though less severe, have occurred since. During November and December 2015, repeated gridlock occurred during evening rush hour nine times in the seven weeks, with delays of beyond an hour to many services.

On 12 December 2017, following moderate snow two days before and icey conditions the previous night, some of the plastic bubbles which are suspended between iron girders and constitute the roof failed, leading to five of the bus bays being closed and a large part of the bus station being cordoned off well into 13 December.

The station consists of 14 departure bays — 12 on its western side and two on its southern side — served from the main concourse building, which contains, toilets, a café and a shop. A further eight bays for southbound journeys out of the town are located on the Drapery.

== Services ==
Services are mainly operated by Stagecoach, with other services operated by Arriva and Country Lion.

National Express and other coach services are run from nearby Victoria Street although there are no facilities.

Stagecoach serves areas within the town and also provides travel to outlying villages and towns within the county, making links to Corby, Daventry, Kettering, Rushden and Wellingborough. They also go as far afield as Bedford, Bicester, Leicester, Market Harborough, Milton Keynes, Peterborough and Rugby.
