= Alexander Dennis Enviro350H =

Hybrid-electric low-floor single-deck bus

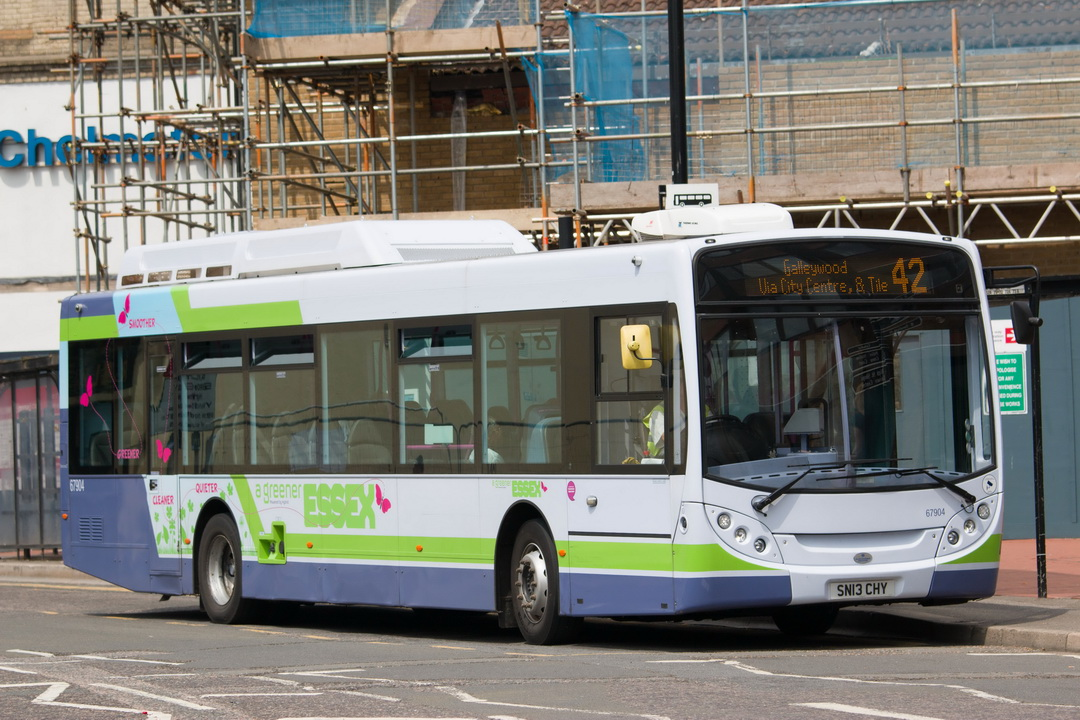
- First Essex Alexander Dennis Enviro350H in July 2014

Overview
- Manufacturer: Alexander Dennis
- Production: 2010-2013 (Hybrid); 2014 (Virtual Electric)
- Assembly: Guildford, England

Body and chassis
- Doors: 1-3
- Floor type: Low floor
- Related: Alexander Dennis Enviro300

Powertrain
- Engine: Cummins ISBe
- Transmission: BAE Systems HybriDrive (hybrid system)

Dimensions
- Length: 12.0 m (39 ft 4 in)
- Width: 2.5 m (8 ft 2 in)
- Height: 3.2 m (10 ft 6 in)
- Curb weight: 19 t (18.7 long tons; 20.9 short tons)

Chronology
- Successor: Alexander Dennis Enviro200EV

The Alexander Dennis Enviro350H was a hybrid-electric powered single-decker bus manufactured by Alexander Dennis between 2010 and 2013. It was the first Alexander Dennis bus model which was only sold as a hybrid-electric vehicle, the Enviro200H, 400H and 500H models having diesel-powered equivalents.

The Enviro350H has its powertrain located at the nearside of the rear overhang, similar to the full-low-floor buses in Europe. It can be equipped with BAE Systems' HybriDrive series-hybrid system with a Cummins ISBe engine as generator.

In 2014, Alexander Dennis announced the virtual electric version known as the Enviro350VE, which can be powered by wireless charging in addition to the hybrid power system. However, there were no confirmed orders of this type and it was subsequently replaced by variants of ADL's newer Enviro200 MMC.

== Operators ==
The bus was targeted for sale in Continental Europe and Australia. The first bus with Tata Hispano Habit bodywork was unveiled at the FIAA 2010 trade show in November 2010, this bus and another similar vehicle were sold for use in the Canary Islands.

Another was bodied in Australia by Custom Coaches and evaluated by the State Transit Authority for 14 months from March 2011. It was later purchased by Torrens Transit.

Stagecoach East Scotland purchased 22 for use at its Bluebird (13) and Perth (9) subsidiaries. All 22 now operate out of Aberdeen's Tullos depot with Stagecoach Bluebird. First Essex purchased four and Transports Metropolitans de Barcelona, Spain 12.
