= Alexander Dennis Enviro300 =

Full-size single-deck bus body and chassis

- Arriva The Shires second generation Alexander Dennis Enviro300 in St Albans in May 2018

Overview
- Manufacturer: TransBus International/ Alexander Dennis
- Production: 2001–2008 (1st generation); 2007–2015 (2nd generation)
- Assembly: Falkirk, Scotland

Body and chassis
- Doors: 1
- Floor type: Low floor Low entry
- Chassis: integral bus MAN 18.240 and 18.250; Volvo B7RLE; Scania K230UB
- Related: Enviro200, Enviro350H, Enviro400, Enviro500

Powertrain
- Engine: Cummins ISBe (integral/MAN 18.240 retrofits); MAN D0836 (MAN 18.240); Volvo D7E (Volvo B7RLE); Scania DC9/OC9 (Scania K230UB)
- Capacity: 40 to 60 seated
- Power output: 185–250 hp (136–184 kW)
- Transmission: ZF Ecomat/EcoLife; Voith DIWA; Allison

Dimensions
- Length: 11.8–12.8 m (38 ft 9 in – 42 ft 0 in)
- Width: 2.54 m (8 ft 4 in)
- Curb weight: 14.4–18 t (14.2–17.7 long tons; 15.9–19.8 short tons)

Chronology
- Predecessor: Body: Alexander ALX300; Chassis: Dennis Lance
- Successor: Alexander Dennis Enviro200 MMC

The Alexander Dennis Enviro300 (previously known as the TransBus Enviro300) is a light-weight full-size single-decker bus that was built by Alexander Dennis and its predecessor TransBus International between 2001 and 2015. The design was the first of the new Enviro range of buses from TransBus and also the first bus to be built as an integral bus by TransBus.

The Enviro300 was introduced in order to fill a gap in the manufacturer's product range. At the beginning the Cummins ISBe220 5.9-litre (1.6 US gal) Euro III engine was provided as standard, but for Euro IV and V, the engine was the 6.7-litre (1.8 US gal) ISBe with 225 hp (168 kW) for Euro IV and 225 or 250 hp (168 or 186 kW) for Euro V. There was a choice of 3 gearboxes: ZF Ecomat (originally 5HP502C, then 6HP504C), Allison T280R and Voith DIWA 854.5 (originally DIWA854.3E). The second generation Enviro300, with front end redesigned to match the Enviro200 and Enviro400, was launched in 2007.

Production of the Enviro300 ceased in 2015 with the introduction of a long-wheelbase Enviro200 MMC.

== First generation (2001–2008) ==
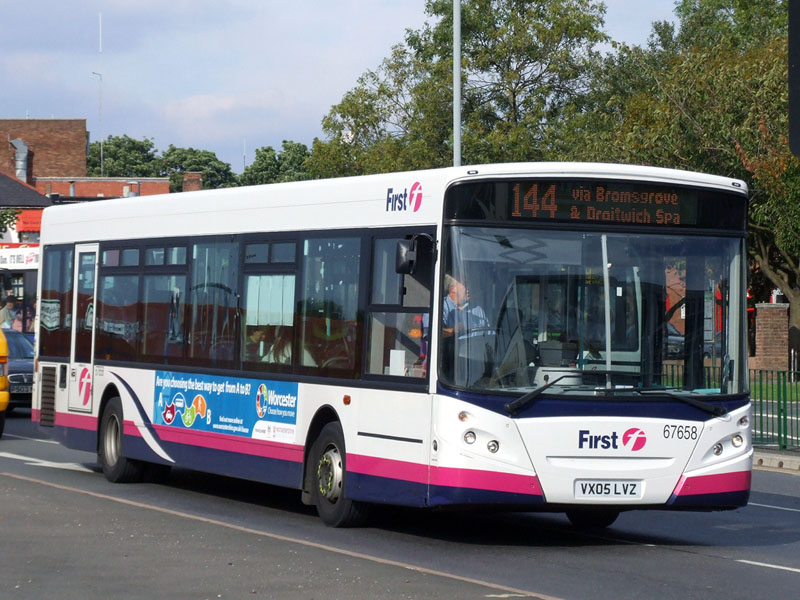
First Midland Red first generation ADL Enviro300 in September 2005

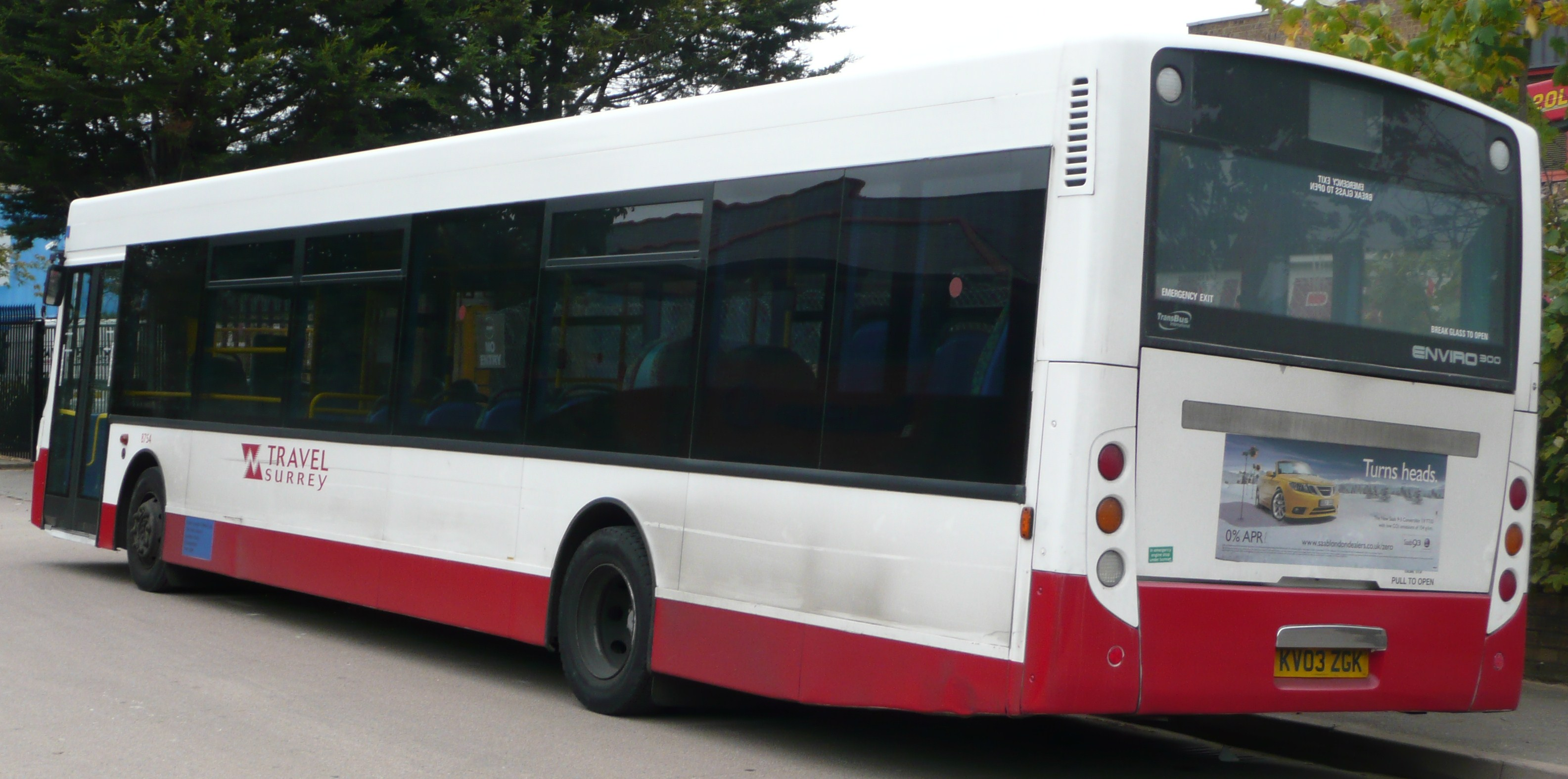
Travel Surrey first generation TransBus Enviro300 rear in October 2008

Developed from the Alexander ALX300 body, the TransBus Enviro300 was launched in 2001 by TransBus International, becoming the first member of the Enviro range; with the collapse of TransBus in 2004, successors Alexander Dennis took over production and rebranded the Enviro300 as the Alexander Dennis Enviro300. In early 2005, Alexander Dennis launched a 12.5 metres (41 ft) school bus variant, branded as the 'sCOOLbus', capable of seating 60 seatbelted passengers or 54 with the addition of a wheelchair bay in a three-plus-two seating configuration.

A common design was used primarily that the bus has a single-curvature windscreen with a peaked roof dome and a separately mounted destination sign. The bus was developed to compete with the European-built heavy-weight single-decker buses sold in the United Kingdom, the most notable being Volvo. Many full-size (12 m (39 ft) or more) single-decker buses are primarily designed for use on the continent and to carry a large number of standing passengers which is commonplace on the continent, but the Enviro300 was designed solely for the UK market where large numbers of standing passengers are not often carried. TransBus therefore believed that operators could make significant fuel savings by operating light-weight buses and produced a vehicle which is claimed to be lighter than its continental rivals but offer more seating capacity.

The Enviro300 had not sold as well as the manufacturer had hoped, though sales were not helped by the collapse of TransBus International in 2004. The first seven Enviro300s were delivered to Truronian for use on Eden Project shuttle services in 2002. First Midland Red were among the biggest customers for the original Enviro300, purchasing 38 new between 2004 and 2005. A smaller number of original Enviro300s were also sold to the Stagecoach Group, Cardiff Bus and Bus Éireann.

The Enviro300 chassis was also able to be fitted with bodywork by other manufacturers, with Courtney Coaches purchasing two East Lancs Esteem bodied examples in 2006.

== Second generation (2007–2015) ==
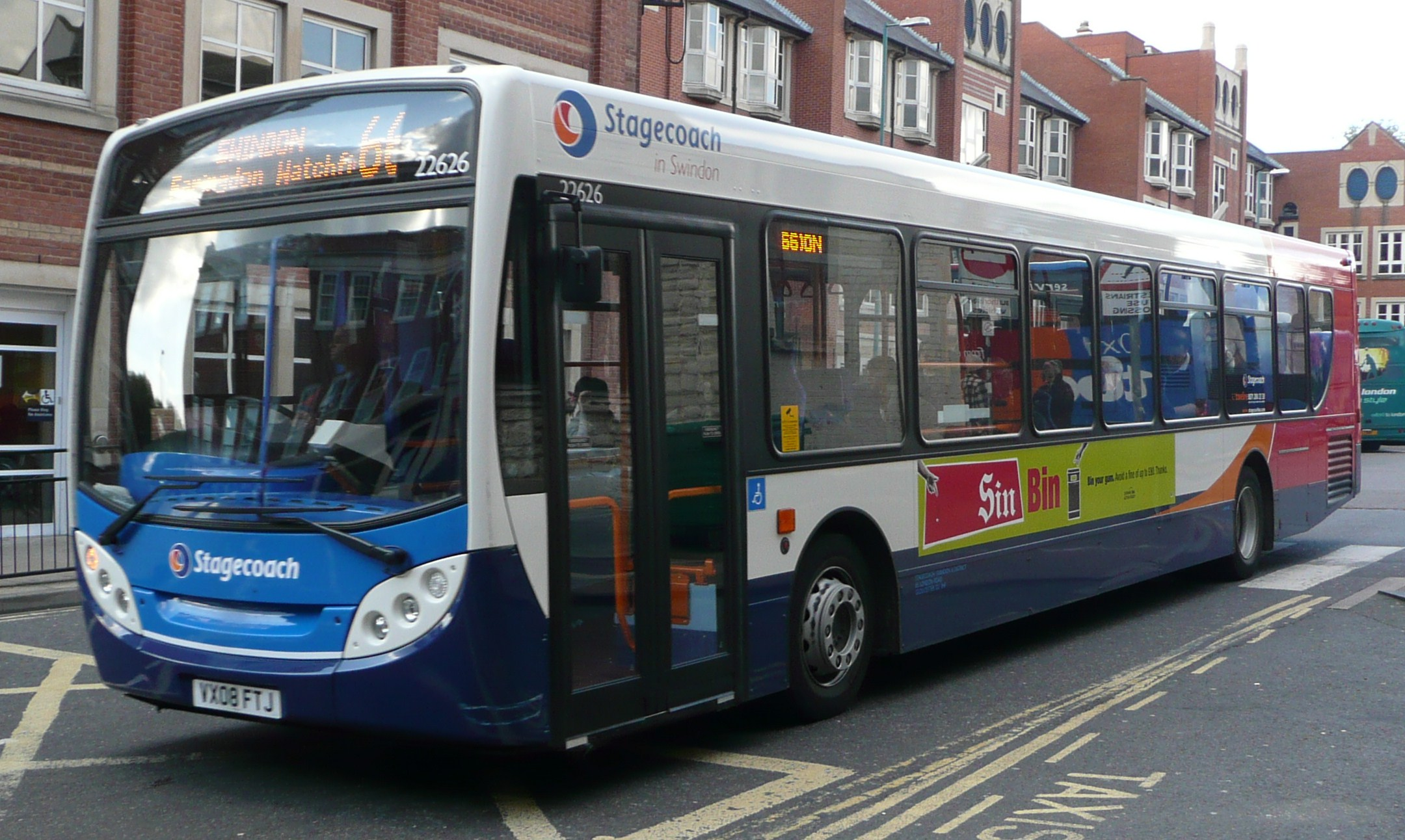

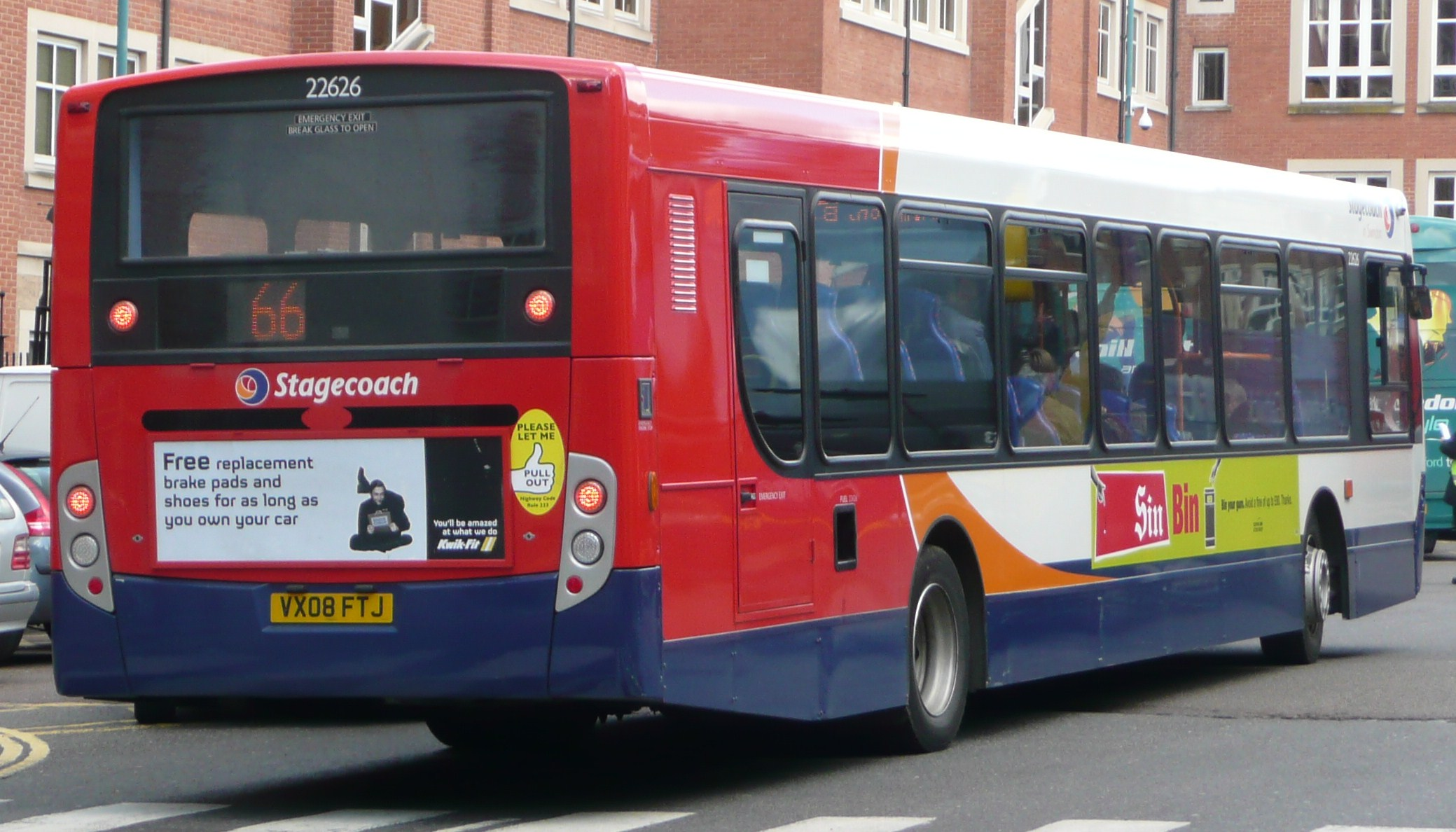
Stagecoach West second generation Enviro300-bodied MAN 18.240 in October 2008

In late 2007 Alexander Dennis introduced a second generation version of Enviro300 which featured styling cues similar to the Enviro200 Dart and the Enviro400. It had a single-piece windscreen covering the destination display (no longer a peaked roof dome similar to the Marshall Capital and the MCV Stirling). In addition to being available as an integral bus, it was also available on MAN 18.240/18.250, Volvo B7RLE and Scania K230UB chassis. The second generation Enviro300 was far more successful sales wise than its predecessor, with Arriva, the FirstGroup and Stagecoach purchasing examples.

The Stagecoach Group standardised on the Enviro300 as its standard full-size single-decker from 2007 until the end of production in 2015, when it was replaced within the group by the full-size Enviro200 MMC. The group first ordered 100 Enviro300 bodied MAN 18.240s in 2007, with the first eight production Enviro300s entering service with Stagecoach in Perth to launch the Stagecoach Goldline bus service in October 2007. Further orders boosted the total number of MAN-chassised Enviro300s operated by Stagecoach Group companies to over 350. Integrally-constructed Enviro300s were distributed across all UK bus operating subsidiaries of Stagecoach, with examples including large numbers delivered to Stagecoach North East for services in Stockton-on-Tees, Stagecoach East Scotland for services in Glenrothes, Kirkcaldy and Perth, and 18 built to revised Stagecoach Gold specification for Stagecoach Merseyside & South Lancashire.

In January 2011, Stagecoach placed an order for 50 Scania K230UBs with Enviro300 bodies. These were followed by further 28 examples between 2012 and 2013, and 28 between 2014 and 2015, including two built to Gold specification for Stagecoach Cumbria & North Lancashire's X4/X5 service.

The FirstGroup were also another customer for the integral second generation Enviro300, albeit in comparatively smaller numbers to Stagecoach. Having ordered 142 integral Enviro300s in 2013, 89 of these were delivered to First Glasgow, 41 were delivered to First Greater Manchester for services in Oldham and Bolton, 23 were delivered to First Aberdeen, and ten were delivered to First Scotland East for a cross-border express service to Carlisle.

In mid-2008, Translink ordered 45 Enviro300 bodied Volvo B7RLEs for its Ulsterbus operation, these being the only Enviro300s to be bodied on this chassis. These were built to a rural specification featuring unique modifications such as narrower entrance doors, a separate wheelchair access door on the nearside, and 55 seatbelted seats arranged in a 2+3 layout.

=== Alternative fuels ===
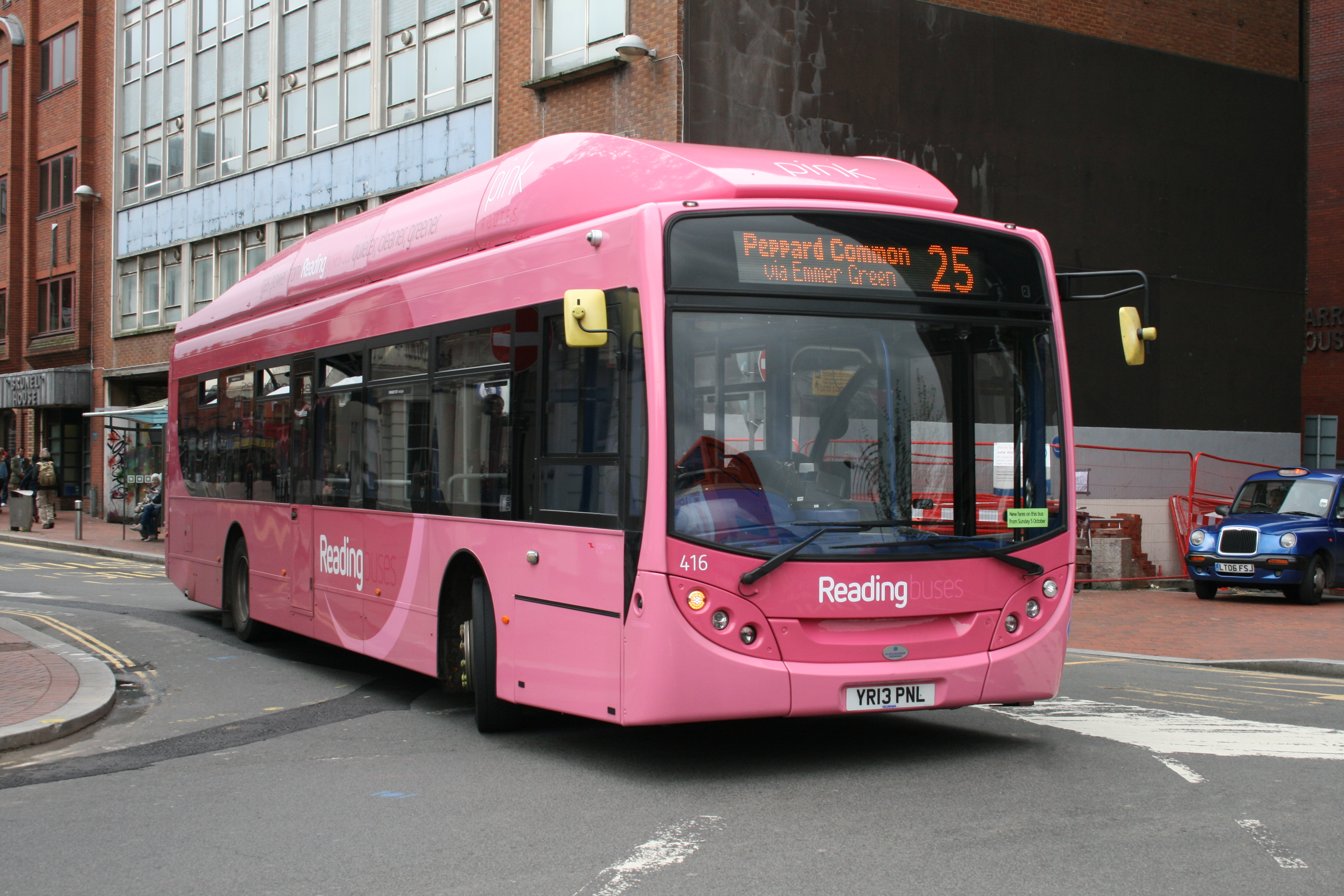
Reading Buses Enviro300SG-bodied Scania K270UB in October 2014

A fleet of ten Enviro300s on MAN 18.240 chassis, which were converted to run on biodiesel produced from tallow and used cooking oil, were delivered to Stagecoach West Scotland for use in Kilmarnock in 2010, replacing older single-deck buses also fuelled by biodiesel.

In April 2013, Reading Buses took delivery of 20 natural gas-powered Enviro300SG buses based on the Scania K270UB chassis. These buses were jointly developed by Alexander Dennis and Scania, who had a demonstrator on loan to other operators from March 2013. Stagecoach North East purchased 40 Enviro300SG bodied Scania K270UBs in 2014 for use on services in Sunderland.

One Enviro300SG was converted by Alexander Dennis to run on biofuel produced from human waste in 2014. Capable of a range of 300 kilometres (190 mi) at maximum capacity, the 'Bio-Bus' was initially loaned to the Bath Bus Company, requiring the installation of a temporary fuelling station at the Bristol Sewage Treatment Works in Avonmouth, before commencing on demonstration duties across the United Kingdom.

A hybrid electric derivative of the integral Enviro300 named the Enviro350H, equipped with BAE Systems hybrid technology used in the Alexander Dennis Enviro400H, was launched by Alexander Dennis in 2010, initially available with Tata Hispano bodywork exclusively for the Continental Europe export market.

== 2019 recall ==
On 10 May 2019, the UK Driver and Vehicle Standards Agency (DVSA) issued an instruction to all operators of both the Enviro200 and the Enviro300 to carry out additional safety checks of front and rear suspension components, following several safety concerns raised by the DVSA. A recall of Enviro200s and Enviro300s was announced by Alexander Dennis shortly after the announcement.

Alexander Dennis issued a service kit to operators of affected Enviro300s. Suspension modifications that came with the kit included the fitment of a polyurethane ring to the front suspension's catcher bracket, restricting movement of the front axle if front springs failed in service, while a bolt migration catcher bracket was fitted for the rear suspension to prevent the suspension's anchor bolt from migrating from the joint in the event of failure of the rear suspension.
