= NFI Group =

Manufacturer of transit buses and motorcoaches based in Winnipeg, Canada

NFI Group Inc.
- Type: Public
- Traded as: TSX: NFI
- Industry: Bus manufacturing
- Predecessor: New Flyer Industries
- Founded: June 16, 2005; 21 years ago
- Headquarters: Winnipeg, Canada
- Area served: Worldwide
- Key people: John Sapp (CEO)
- Products: Motorcoaches and transit buses
- Revenue: ▲US$3.12 billion (2024)
- Operating income: ▲US$108.56 million (2024)
- Net income: ▲US$3.3 million (2024)
- Owner: Coliseum Capital Management (19.9%); Marcopolo (10.8%)
- Number of employees: 9,000
- Subsidiaries: Alexander Dennis; ARBOC Specialty Vehicles; Carfair Composites; Motor Coach Industries; New Flyer; NFI Parts; Plaxton
- Website: nfigroup.com

NFI Group Inc. is a Canadian multinational bus manufacturer, based in Winnipeg, Canada. The company employs 9,000 people across 50 facilities in nine countries. NFI Group owns Alexander Dennis, ARBOC Specialty Vehicles, Motor Coach Industries, New Flyer, Plaxton, NFI Parts, and Carfair Composites. The company is listed on the Toronto Stock Exchange under the symbol NFI, and is a constituent of the S&P/TSX Composite Index.

== History ==
NFI Group was created on June 16, 2005, as the holding company of New Flyer Industries so it could be publicly traded on the Toronto Stock Exchange.

In October 2008, NFI Group. was named one of Canada's Top 100 Employers, which was announced in The Globe and Mail newspaper, and the company was featured in Maclean's newsmagazine. Later that month, New Flyer was also named one of Manitoba's Top Employers, which was announced by the Winnipeg Free Press newspaper.

The company converted to a corporate structure from a trust-like structure in October 2011.

Brazilian bus manufacturer Marcopolo S.A. acquired a 19.99% stake of New Flyer on January 23, 2013, for $116 million, the maximum it could acquire without offering to buy out other shareholders. Marcopolo would later reduce its stake in the company to 10.8% on September 22, 2016, although it remains the largest individual shareholder.

=== Mergers and acquisitions ===
Since 2013, the NFI Group has completed several mergers and acquisitions that have expanded the company beyond its original focus on heavy-duty transit buses for the North American market and into on several other bus types and markets.

As competing manufacturer Daimler exited the North American market in 2013, New Flyer purchased the aftermarket parts business for its Orion brand of heavy-duty transit buses for US$29 million. Under the agreement, New Flyer acquired the Orion parts inventory, the company's accounts, licence to use proprietary part designs and agreed to provide parts for customer warranty support.

On June 21, 2013, New Flyer agreed to acquire competing heavy-duty transit bus manufacturer, North American Bus Industries (NABI) for US$80 million. Upon completion of NABI's outstanding orders, New Flyer converted the former NABI factory in Anniston, Alabama into a fourth facility to produce the Xcelsior heavy-duty transit bus.

On November 10, 2015, New Flyer agreed to acquire motorcoach manufacturer Motor Coach Industries from KPS Capital Partners for US$459 million, with the deal closing on December 18, 2015.

On December 1, 2017, NFI acquired Middlebury, Indiana-based small cutaway and medium duty bus manufacturer ARBOC Specialty Vehicles for US$95 million.

On May 28, 2019, NFI Group purchased British bus and coach manufacturer Alexander Dennis, including its subsidiary Plaxton, for £320 million (US$438.36 million) from Souter Investments.

== Subsidiaries ==
The company owns several subsidiaries that produce various kinds of buses:

- Alexander Dennis – Heavy-duty transit buses and double-deck transit buses
- ARBOC Specialty Vehicles – Medium-duty transit buses and cutaway buses
- Motor Coach Industries – Motorcoaches
- New Flyer – Heavy-duty transit buses
- Plaxton – Motorcoaches for the European market

The company also owns a few companies that produce parts for buses:

- NFI Parts - Aftermarket bus parts
- Carfair Composites - Fibreglass component supplier

=== Gallery ===
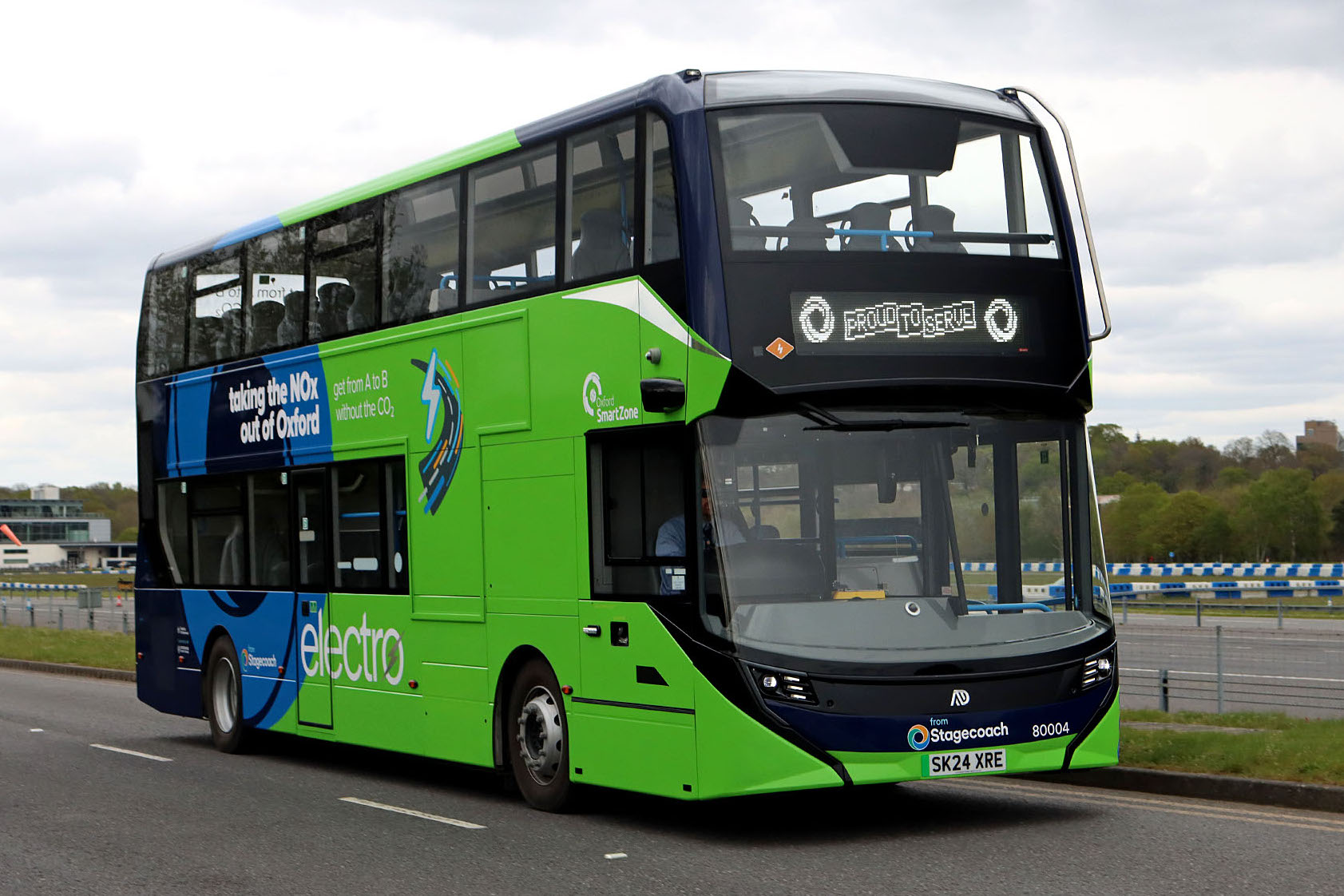
Alexander Dennis double-deck transit bus

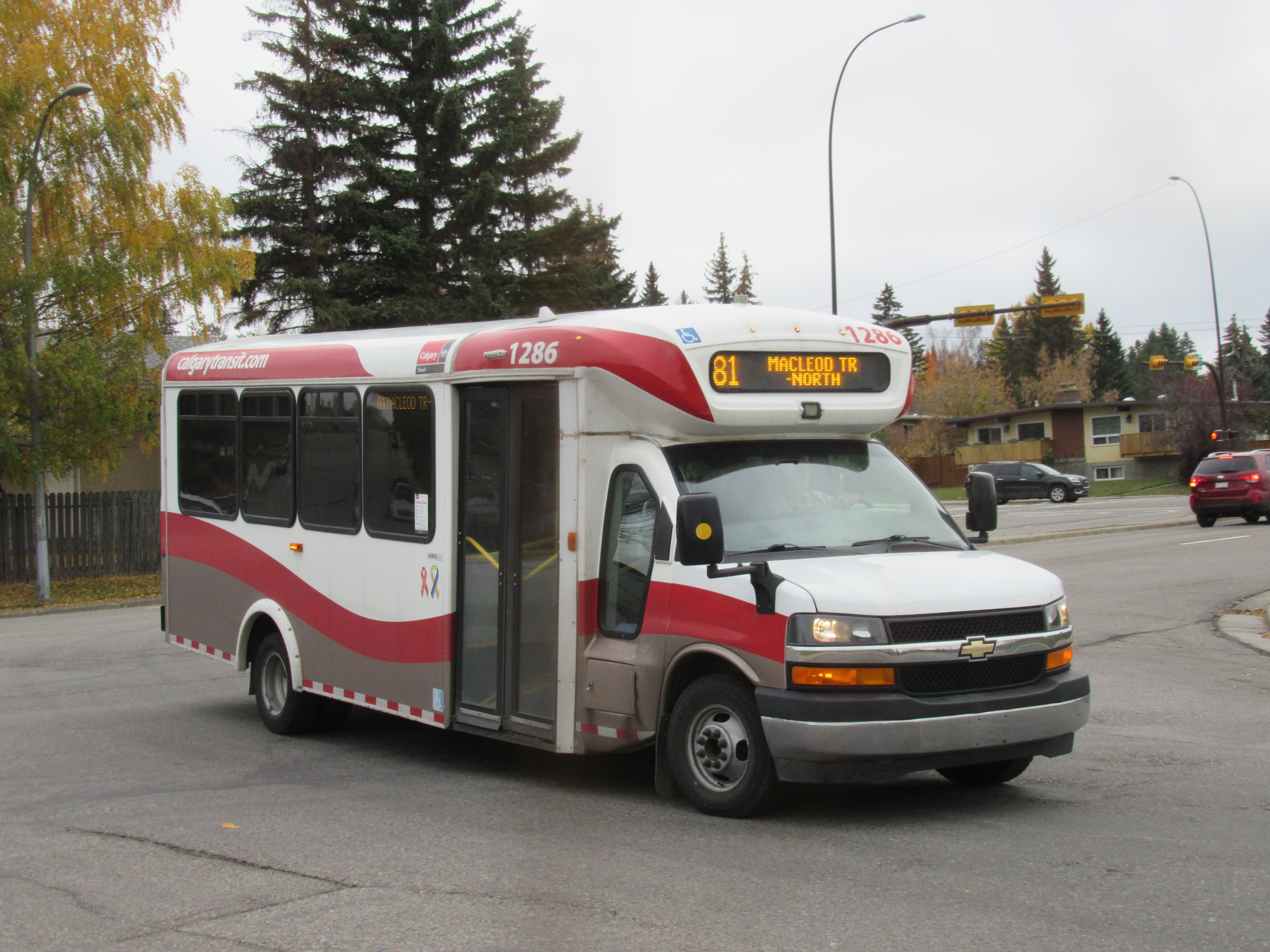
ARBOC cutaway van chassis transit bus

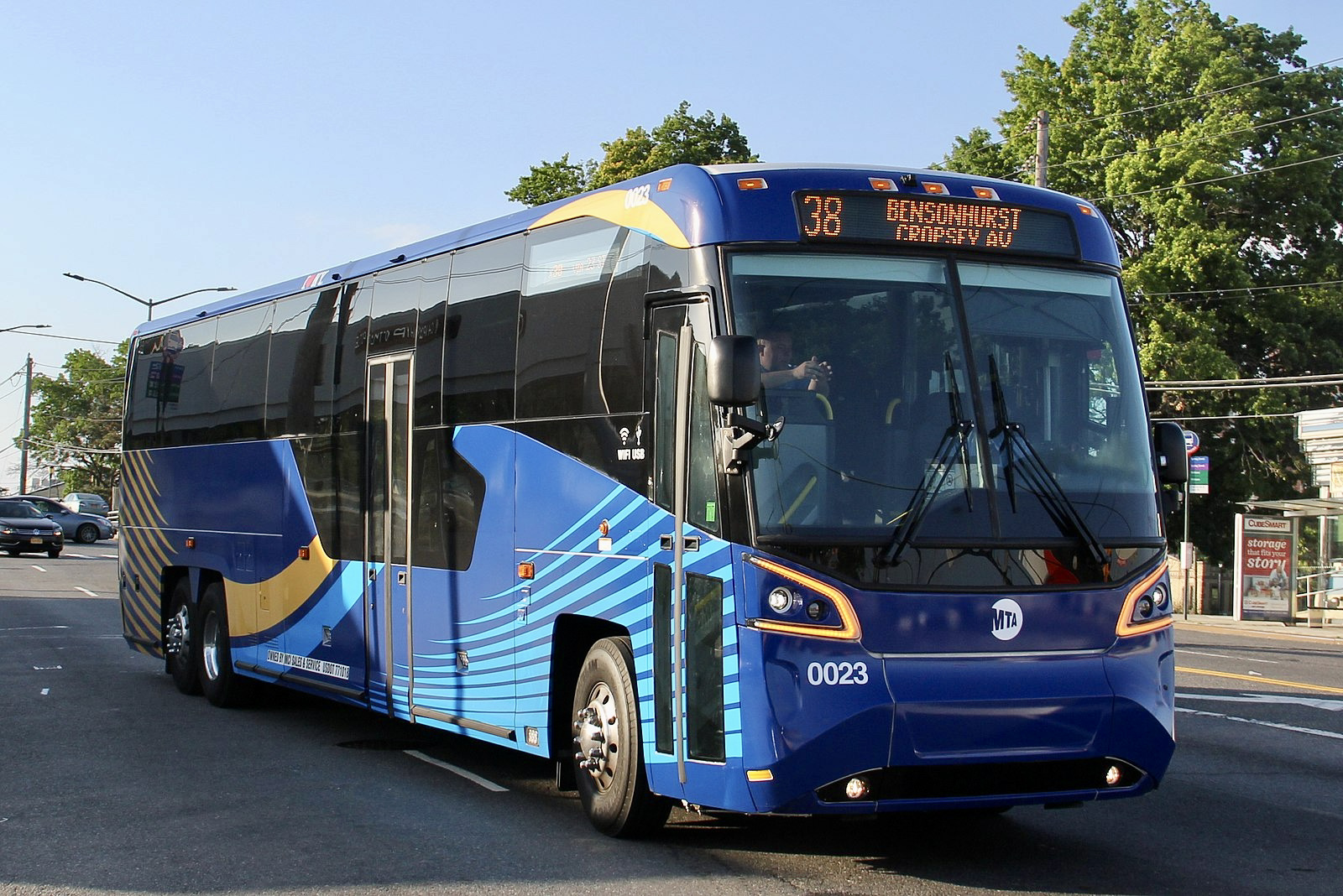
Motor Coach Industries motorcoach

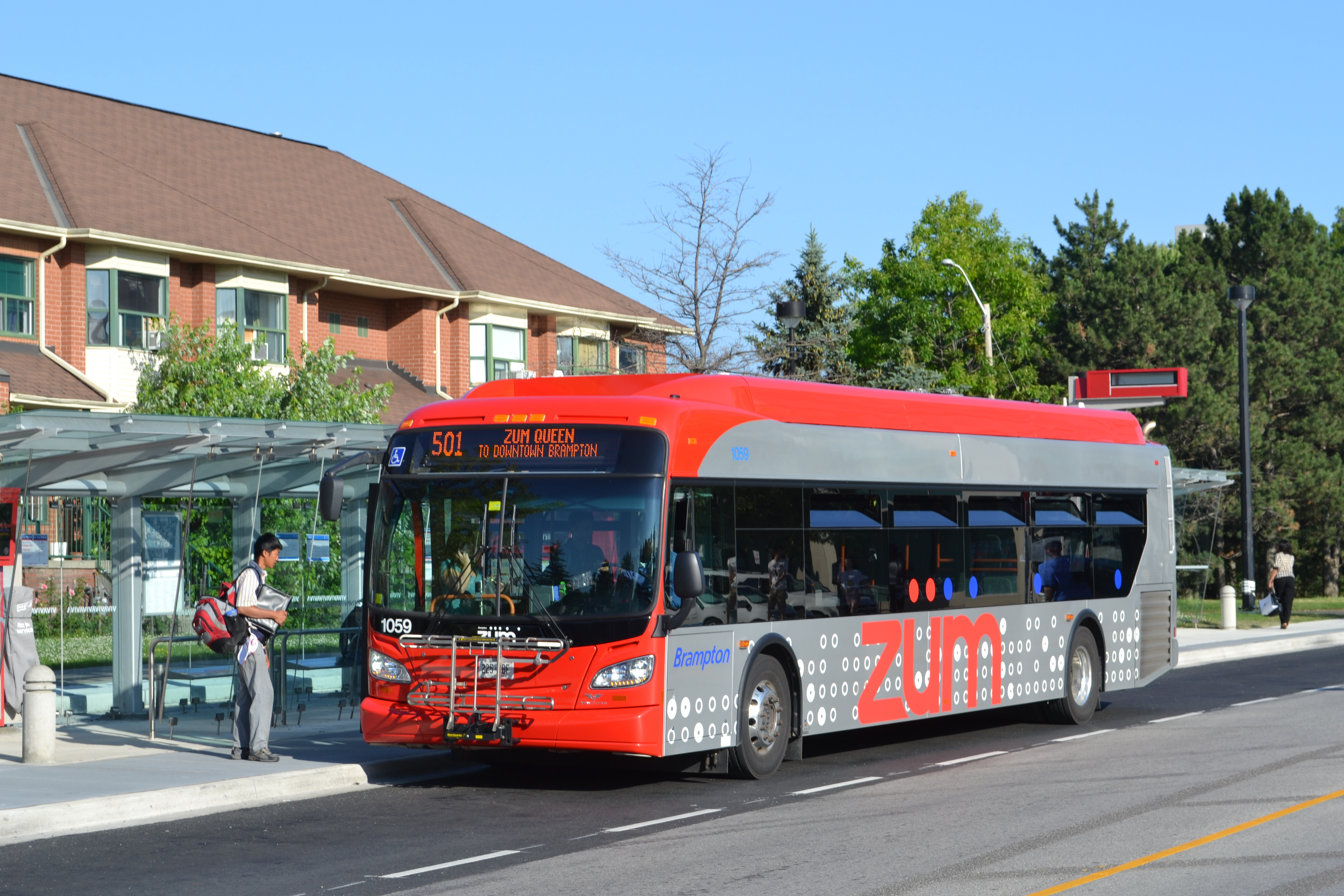
New Flyer heavy-duty transit bus

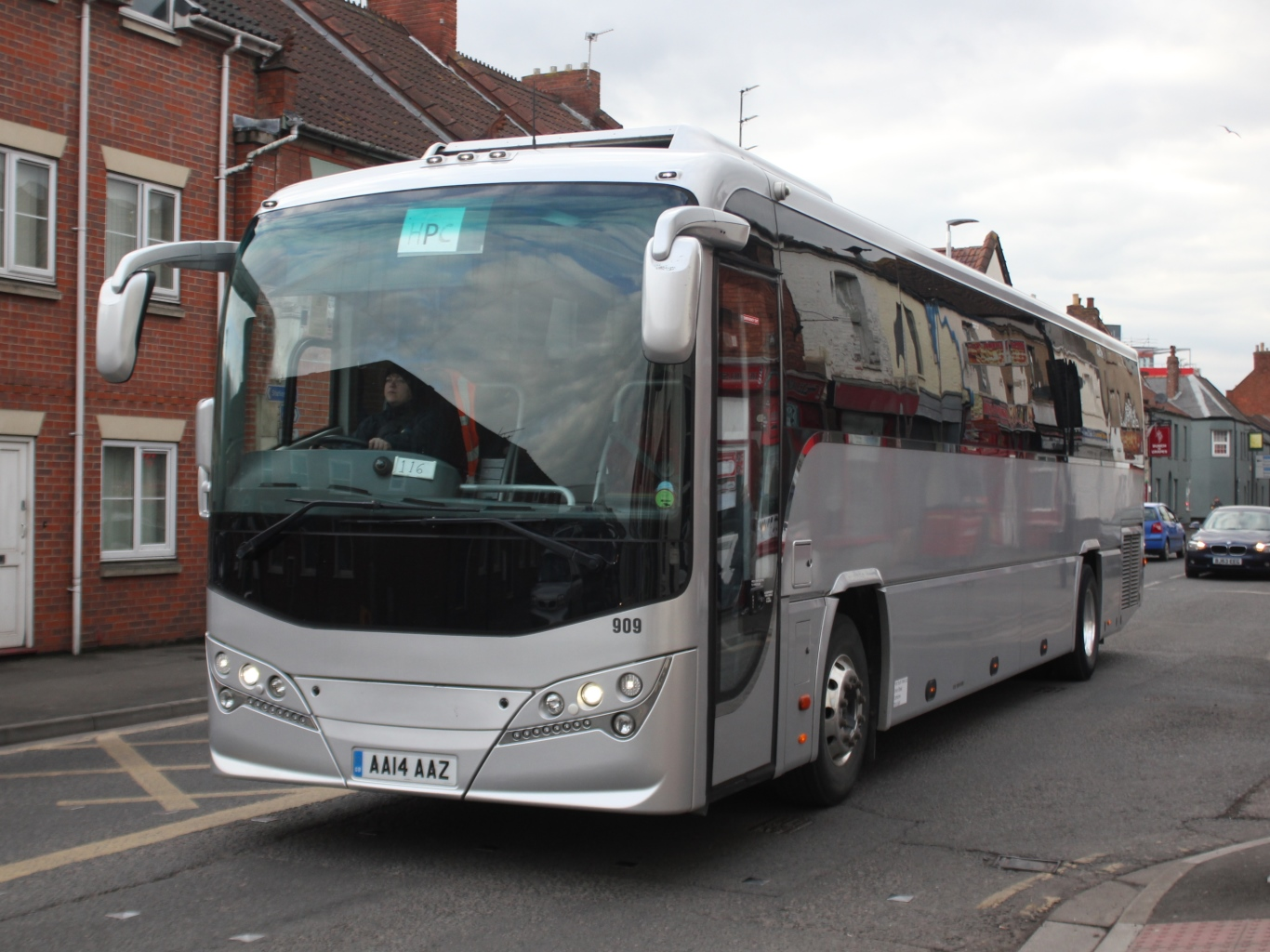
Plaxton motorcoach
