= Alexander Dennis =

Bus manufacturer based in the United Kingdom

Alexander Dennis Ltd.
- Type: Subsidiary
- Industry: Bus manufacturing
- Predecessor: TransBus International
- Founded: 2001; 25 years ago (As TransBus International); 2004; 22 years ago (As Alexander Dennis)
- Headquarters: Larbert, Scotland, UK
- Key people: Paul Davies, President & Managing Director
- Products: Buses
- Revenue: £521 million (2024)
- Net income: £(35) million (2024)
- Number of employees: 1,938 (2024)
- Parent: NFI Group
- Website: www.alexander-dennis.com

Alexander Dennis Ltd. (Note: Alexander Dennis has a shorter term for their company being ADL that has actually been used for official communications, press releases, and reports, as do government bodies and news organizations. Additionally, it has been used by the official UK Parliament Document.) is a bus manufacturing company based in Larbert, Scotland. It is the largest bus and coach manufacturer in Scotland, with a 50% market share in 2019, it has manufacturing plants and partnerships in Canada, China, Europe, Hong Kong, Malaysia, New Zealand, Singapore, South Africa and the United States.

== History ==
=== TransBus - the precursor of Alexander Dennis ===
Previous logo of the company from 2004 to 2022

Mayflower Corporation acquired Scottish bus-makers, Walter Alexander, in August 1995 and English bus-makers, Dennis Group, in October 1998. In 2000, Mayflower and Henlys Group merged their British bus-making operations into a 70:30 joint venture with Alexander, Dennis and Henlys' Plaxton merged to form TransBus International. The factories concerned employed 3,300 staff in seven places in England (Anston, Guildford, Scarborough and Wigan), Scotland (Falkirk) and Northern Ireland (Belfast).

Plaxton's Scarborough operations was planned to close on 3 May 2001 with the loss of 700 jobs blamed on the fall in tourism after the foot and mouth epidemic broke out. Minibus production was moved to the former Walter Alexander factory at Falkirk. However, the Scarborough factory did not close altogether, for 200 staff returned to work after the summer break.

Mayflower was valued at £700 million in 1999. By March 2004, that stock market valuation had fallen to £22 million. The following month Mayflower was placed in administration, amid accusations of four years of falsifying crucial company records as to customers' payments to HSBC, counting the same income twice. One outcome was that certain members of the Dennis pension fund would receive only 40 per cent of their pensions, though others would continue to receive their full entitlement. TransBus was also placed in administration.

TransBus Plaxton was sold to in a management buyout to Brian Davidson and Mike Keane with the support of a private equity group.

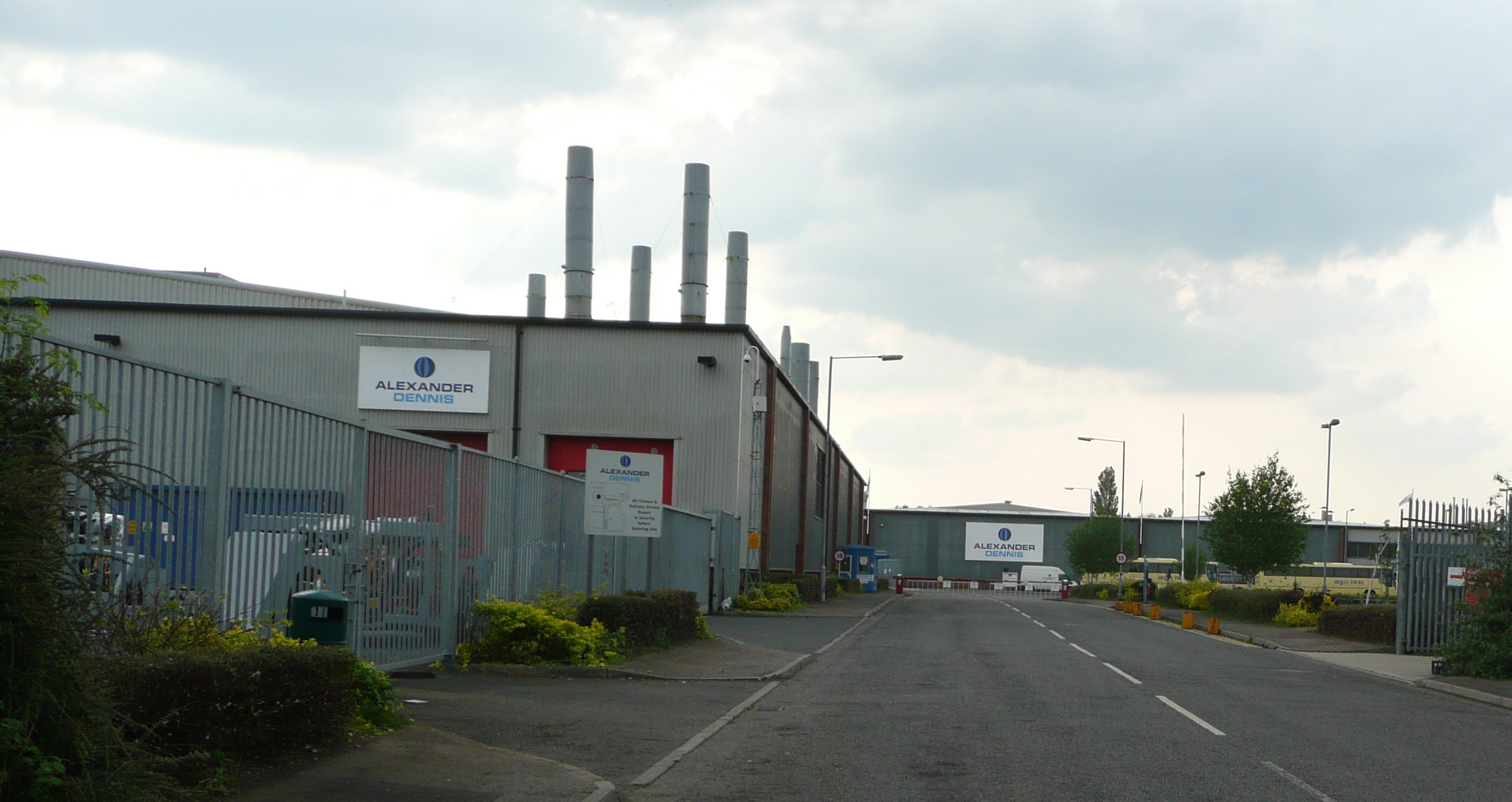
The former Alexander Dennis chassis factory in Guildford, closed in 2020

=== Formation of Alexander Dennis ===
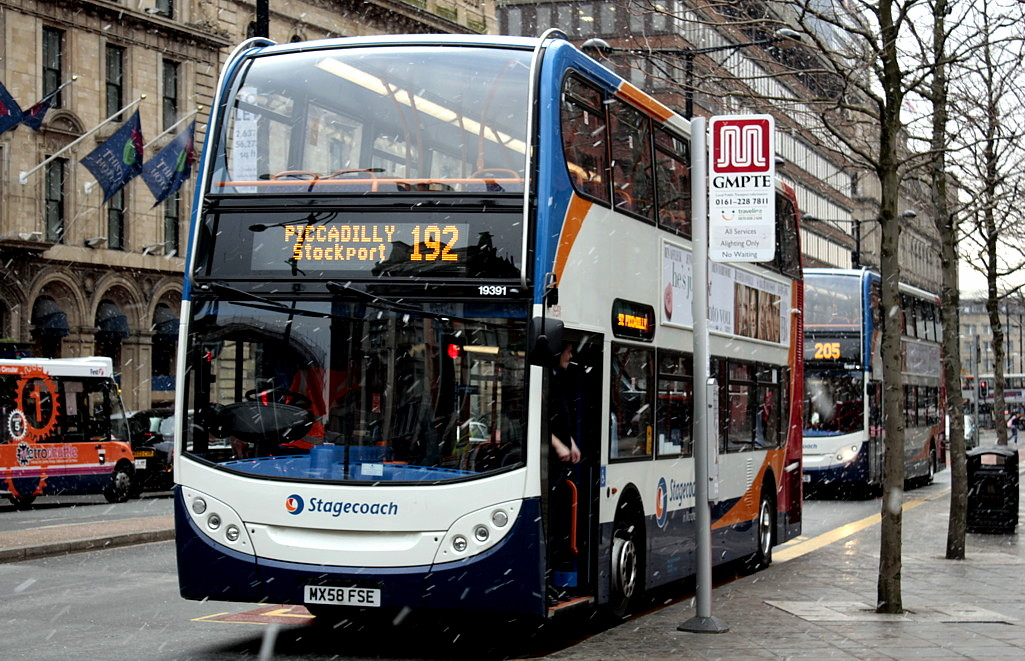
Stagecoach Manchester Enviro400 in February 2009

A group of Scottish investors, Noble Grossart, David Murray, Brian Souter and Ann Gloag, purchased the business from administrator Deloitte in May 2004.

The former Alexander Belfast plant was not included in the deal and closed. Alexander Dennis ultimately inherited a number of plants from TransBus: the former Alexander factories in Falkirk, Scotland; the Dennis factory in Guildford and later the former Plaxton factories in Anston and Scarborough. The former Northern Counties factory in Wigan closed in January 2005.

Dennis Group had produced a range of both bus and coach chassis and bodies as well as fire engines. Included among its range of chassis were the Dennis Dart and Dennis Trident. They also produced export variants for service in Hong Kong, Singapore and other locations. Plaxton made coaches, as well as the President double decker body (built on Trident, DAF DB250 and Volvo B7TL chassis) and the single decker Pointer body, built on the Dart chassis.

In May 2007, Alexander Dennis purchased Plaxton, thus reuniting the two former TransBus businesses.

In October 2008, Alexander Dennis signed a deal with ElDorado National to assemble the Enviro500 for the United States market. In 2011, Alexander Dennis entered an agreement with Kiwi Bus Builders to assemble its products for the New Zealand market.

In May 2012, NFI Group and Alexander Dennis announced a new joint-venture to design and manufacture medium-duty low-floor bus (or midi bus) for the North American market. New Flyer would handle production and marketing, and Alexander Dennis would handle the engineering and testing. The joint venture was dissolved in 2017. In June 2012, Alexander Dennis acquired Australian bodybuilder Custom Coaches. However, in May 2014, Custom Coaches was placed into administration and later sold to a consortium headed by its former owner.

In 2015 Alexander Dennis established an assembly plant in Vaughan, Ontario for orders to Metrolinx. In October 2015, Alexander Dennis signed a deal with BYD to body electric buses. From 2021, Alexander Dennis will build its own electric chassis.

=== NFI Group era ===
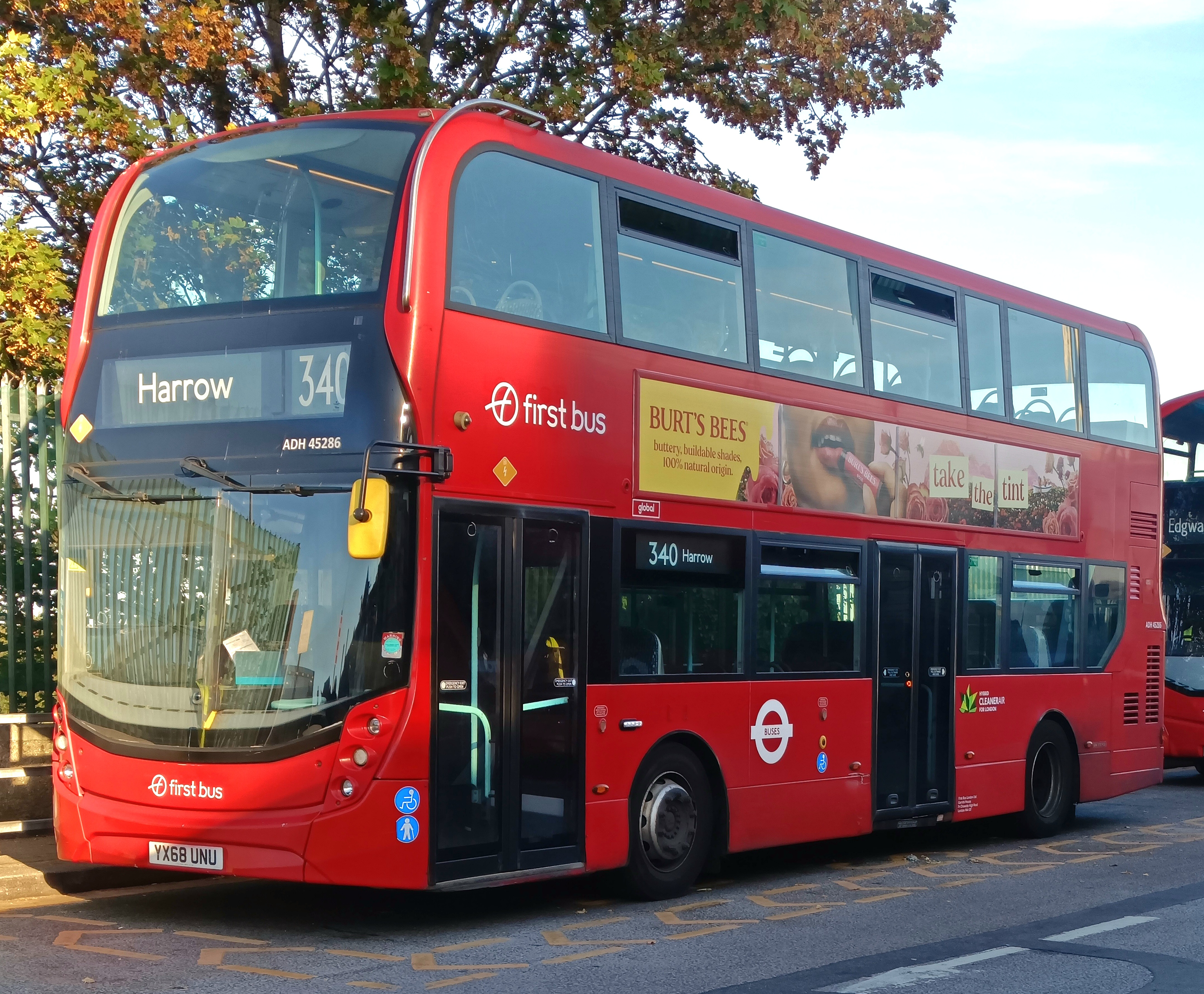
First Bus London Enviro400 MMC in London in September 2025

In May 2019, Alexander Dennis was sold to NFI Group, in a deal worth £320 million. Souter Investments retain an interest, taking shares in NFI Group as part of the transaction. The two companies had been engaged in a joint venture from 2012 until 2017.

In August 2020, Alexander Dennis announced plans to cut 650 jobs from its UK manufacturing sites including Falkirk, Scarborough and Guildford, citing a demand drop due to the COVID-19 pandemic. Bus chassis production moved from Guildford to Falkirk.

June 2021 saw Alexander Dennis open a base in Ballymena, Northern Ireland, which was described by local media as "boosting economic growth".

In July 2021, Alexander Dennis announced plans for construction of a new staff office complex and museum in Farnborough, Hampshire named Trident House. The centre was expected to be completed in early 2022. Alexander Dennis also entered a business partnership with Australian electric bus supplier Nexport to assemble electric city buses locally, with Australian manufacturing expected to begin in early 2022.

In April 2022, Alexander Dennis commenced trials of an autonomous Alexander Dennis Enviro200 MMC working with Stagecoach Group, as part of a two-week pilot. Two months later in June, the company formally opened its Trident House complex, while at the same time, launched a refresh of its brand identity.

==== Consolidation ====
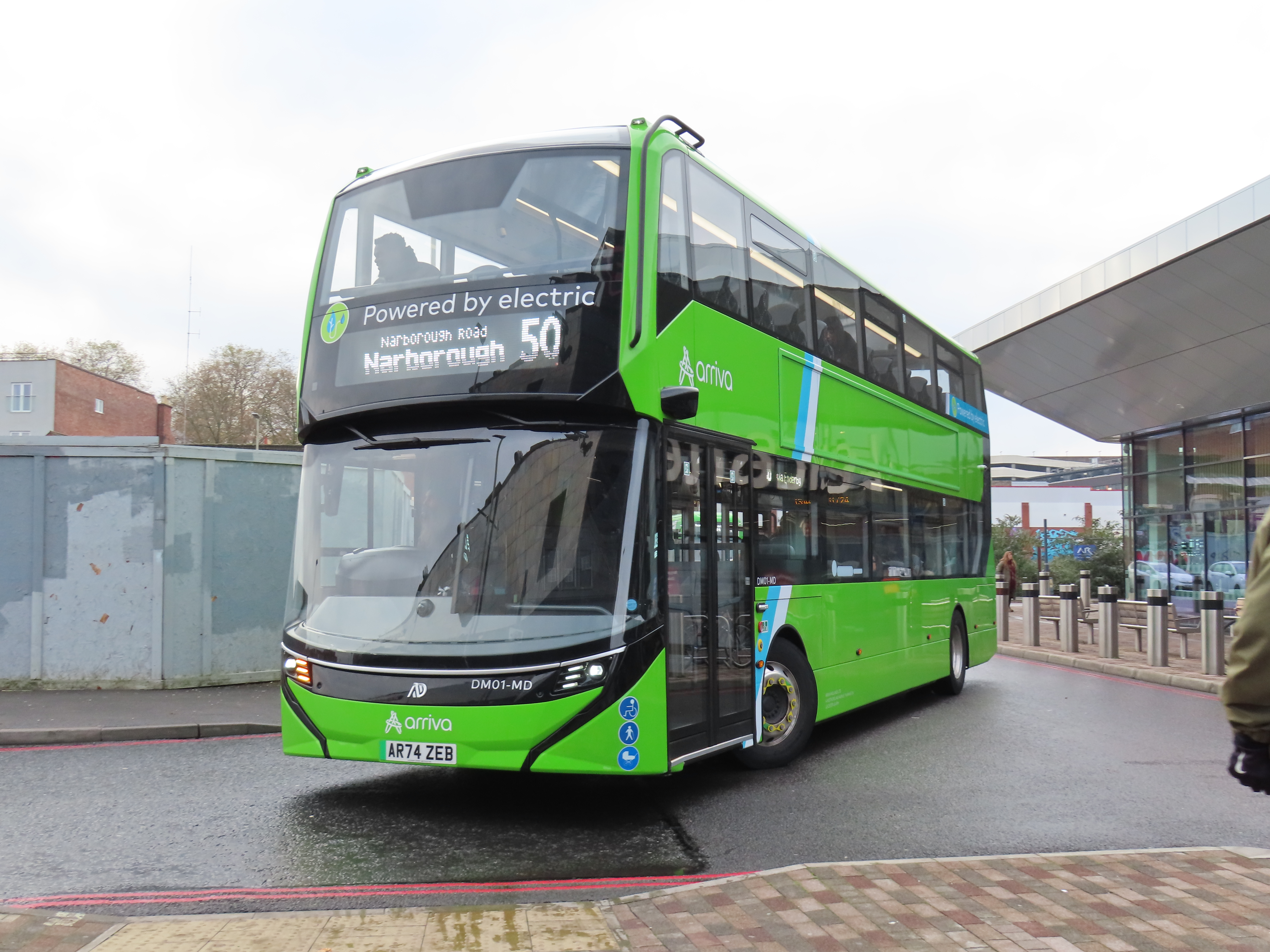
Arriva Midlands Enviro400EV battery electric bus in Leicester in November 2024

After building a batch of Enviro400FCEV buses in a pilot scheme at the site in 2022, Alexander Dennis announced it would expand its Larbert headquarters by converting on-site warehouse space to bus manufacturing facilities. Production of the second-generation Alexander Dennis Enviro400EV began at Larbert from August 2023, taking the company's manufacturing footprint in the United Kingdom to three sites.

In November 2022, Alexander Dennis announced new electric technology partners for its next generation Enviro400EV and Enviro100EV buses, with Voith for drivelines and Impact Clean Power Technology for lithium-nickel-manganese-cobalt batteries. The BYD partnership would be retained for other buses. On 7 August 2023, Alexander Dennis and BYD jointly celebrated handing over their 1,500th electric bus. By 2024 the BYD partnership was winding down, though they will continue to support the over 2,300 buses jointly produced.

In June 2025, Alexander Dennis announced production at Larbert was to be suspended, with plans also being consulted to shut down its factory in Falkirk in an effort to cut costs and 'duplicate activities'. It is planned for all UK manufacturing to be consolidated in Scarborough, risking the loss of 400 jobs at Falkirk and Larbert, representing 22% of the Alexander Dennis workforce. As a result of uncertainty surrounding the Falkirk factory, Fife-based Greenfold Systems, one of Alexander Dennis' parts suppliers, entered administration on 10 July with the loss of 81 jobs. Amid negotiations between Alexander Dennis and the Scottish Government, Alexander Dennis placed the Falkirk factory up for sale at the end of July.

Amid the uncertainty over Falkirk, in August 2025, Alexander Dennis launched a subsidiary in partnership with KleanDrive named AD Repower, specialising in the fitting of Voith Electrical Drive System drivetrains and KleanDrive 'plug and play' software to existing diesel Alexander Dennis buses. A pilot Alexander Dennis Enviro400 MMC converted to battery electric drive is set to be launched for the United Kingdom market in 2026, with AD Repower planned to be expanded to other ADL products and to international markets if uptake for the Enviro400 MMC conversion proves strong.

A second North American factory owned and operated by US subsidiary Alexander Dennis Incorporated, located in North Las Vegas, Nevada, was also opened in August 2025 to assemble Buy America Act-compliant Alexander Dennis Enviro500 MMCs for the North American market, with the first ten Enviro500 MMCs built at the factory delivered to RTC Transit for use on 'The Deuce', which runs along the Las Vegas Strip.

On 15 September, the Scottish Government announced that following negotiations involving Alexander Dennis, Scottish Enterprise and trade unions, the company's Falkirk and Larbert facilities were to remain open and manufacturing, saving the 400 threatened jobs through a £4 million 26-week furlough scheme. Alexander Dennis' position in Scotland was bolstered with the receipt of new single and double-decker bus orders, however eleven workers not related to Scottish manufacturing were still at risk of redundancy as a result of company reorganisation.

As a result of further orders and government support not materialising as hoped, on 31 March 2026, a consultation was announced for new plans by Alexander Dennis to close its Falkirk factory and reorganise the Larbert factory as solely a chassis production facility, with the possibility of restarting bodywork production in the event demand improves for Alexander Dennis buses. Up to 350 jobs are to be retained in Scotland through these plans, safeguarding 200 of these previously at risk of redundancy, however 115 jobs are still at risk of being lost.

By November 2026, all domestic bodywork production was taking place in Scarborough, with Larbert's bodybuilding capacity retained in the event of sufficiently high demand. The Falkirk factory is due to be imminently vacated while chassis production at Larbert expands from 12 to 30 chassis per week.

== Products ==
=== Buses ===
==== Current ====
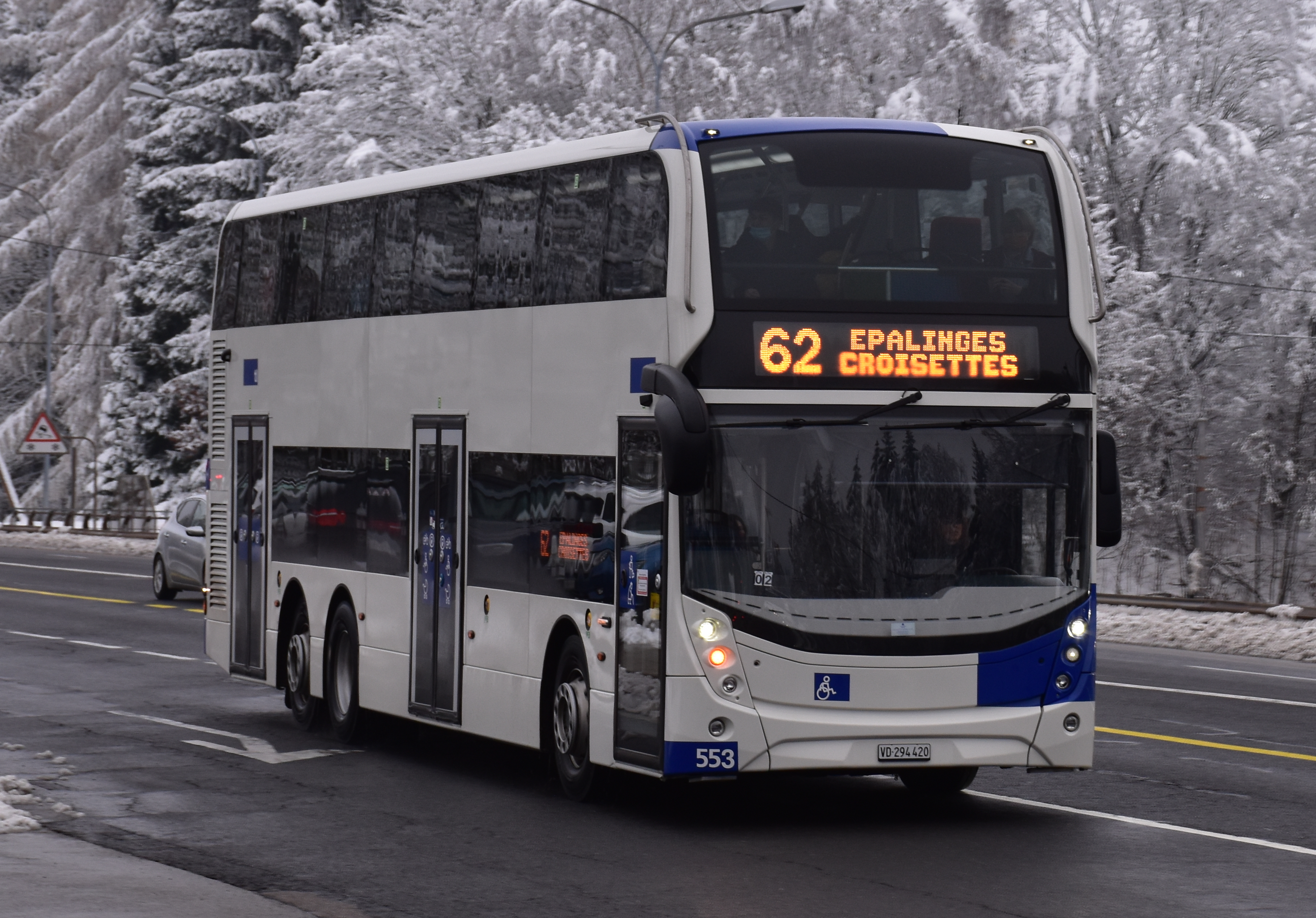
Transports publics de la région lausannoise Enviro500 MMC Facelift in Lausanne, Switzerland, in December 2020

Complete buses

- Enviro100EV (2023-present)
- Enviro200MMC (2015–present)
- Enviro200EV (2015–present)
- Enviro400MMC (2014–present)
- Enviro400 City (2015–present)
- Enviro400EV (2018–present)
- Enviro500MMC (2012–present)
- Enviro500EV (2021–present)

==== Discontinued ====
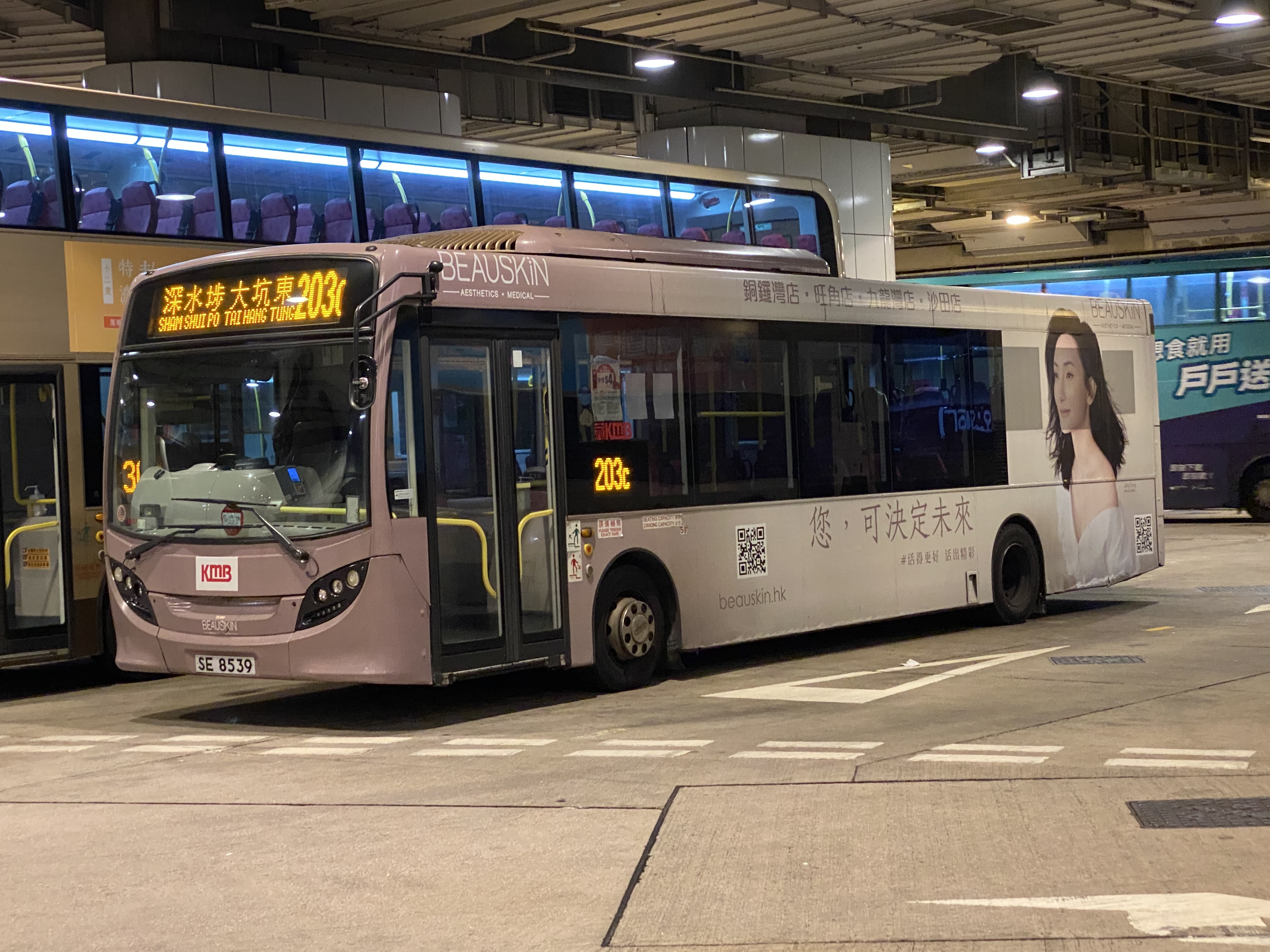
Kowloon Motor Bus Enviro200 in Hong Kong in December 2020

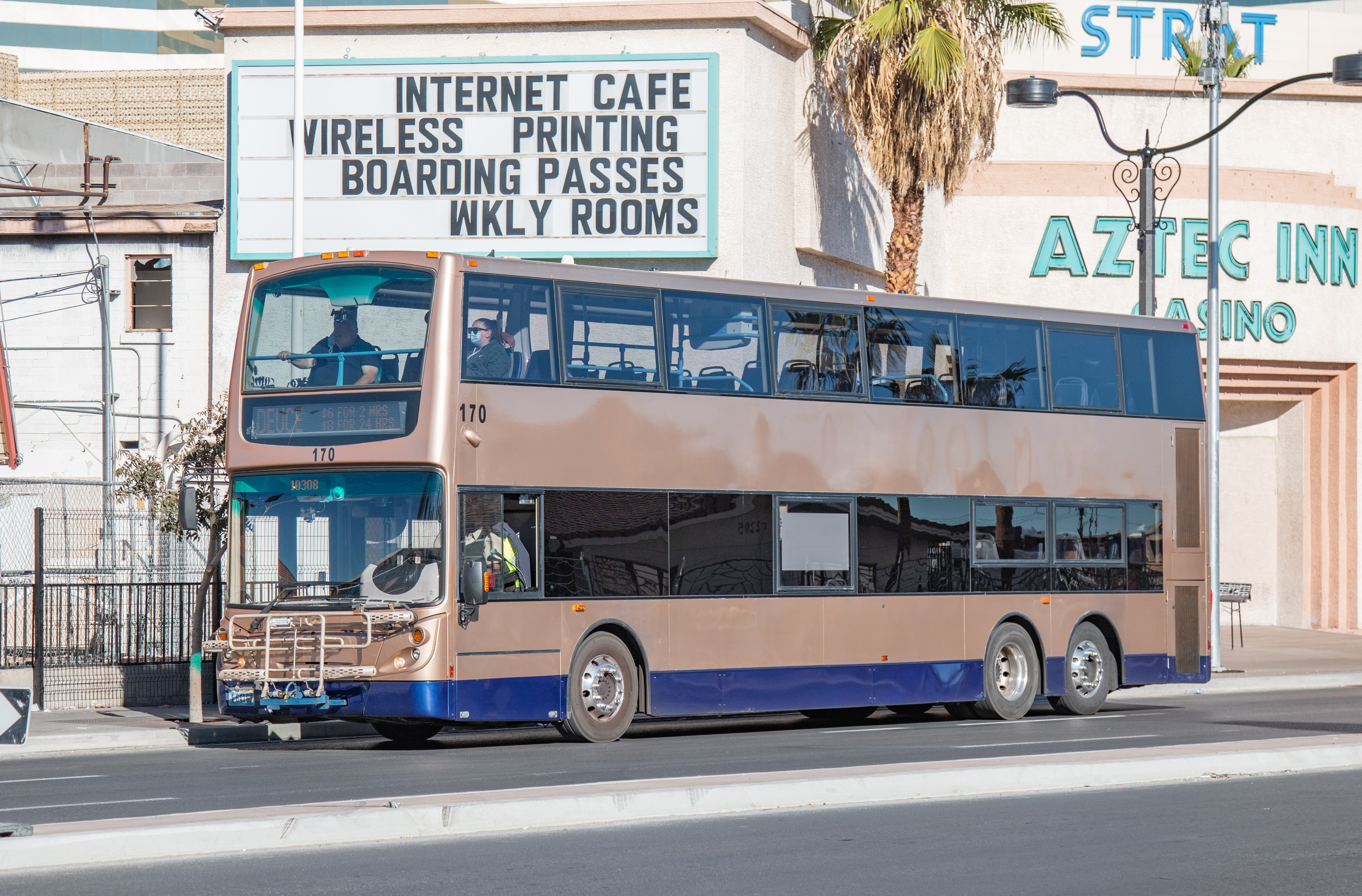
RTC Transit Enviro500 in Las Vegas in November 2021

Bus bodies

- Pointer (2001–2007, originally made by Plaxton, replaced by Enviro200 Dart)
- ALX200 (2001–2006, originally by Alexander, replaced by Enviro200)
- ALX300 (2001–2007, originally Alexander, replaced by Enviro300)
- ALX400 (2001–2006, originally Alexander, replaced by Enviro400)
- President (2001–2005, originally Plaxton, replaced by Enviro400)

Complete buses (or chassis/body only)

- Enviro200/200H (TransBus, 2003–2007)
- Enviro200 Dart (2006–2017, Enviro200H hybrid 2008–2011)
- Enviro300 (2001–2015)
  - Enviro350H (2010–2013)
- Enviro400 (2005–2018)
- Enviro500 (2002–2014)

Bus chassis

- Dart SLF
- Trident 2

Coach chassis

- Javelin
- R-Series

=== Fire engine (Chassis and crew cab) ===
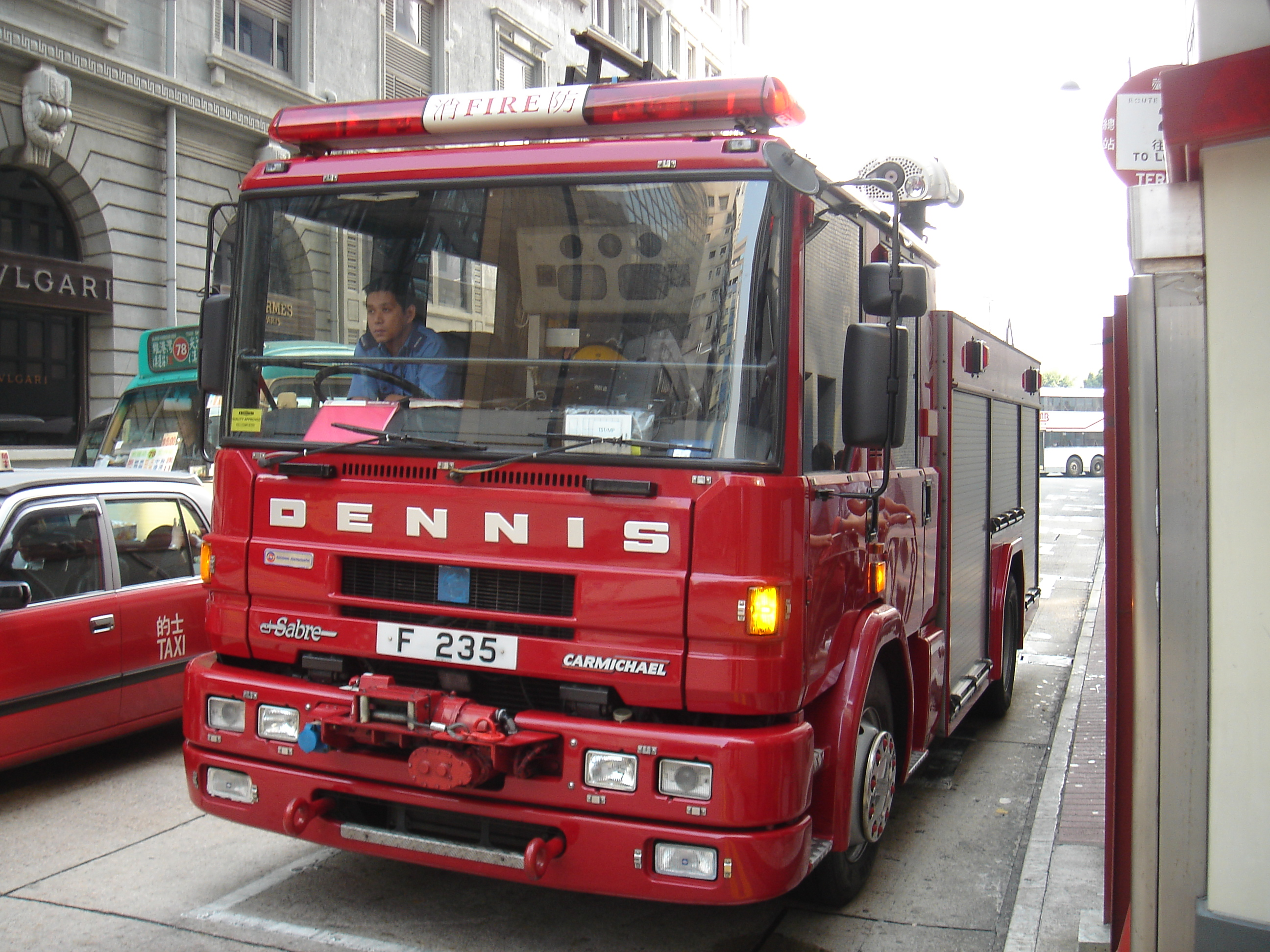
Hong Kong Fire Services Department Dennis Sabre fire engine

Fire engine vehicles were built by Dennis Group and sold under the Dennis Fire brand until 2007. The bodywork on a majority of the later chassis were built by a neighbouring company, John Dennis Coachbuilders Limited.

==== Discontinued ====
- Sabre
- Rapier
- Dagger
- RS/SS
- DS
- DFS

== See also ==
- List of buses
