= Jim Stones Coaches =

Bus operator in Leigh, Greater Manchester

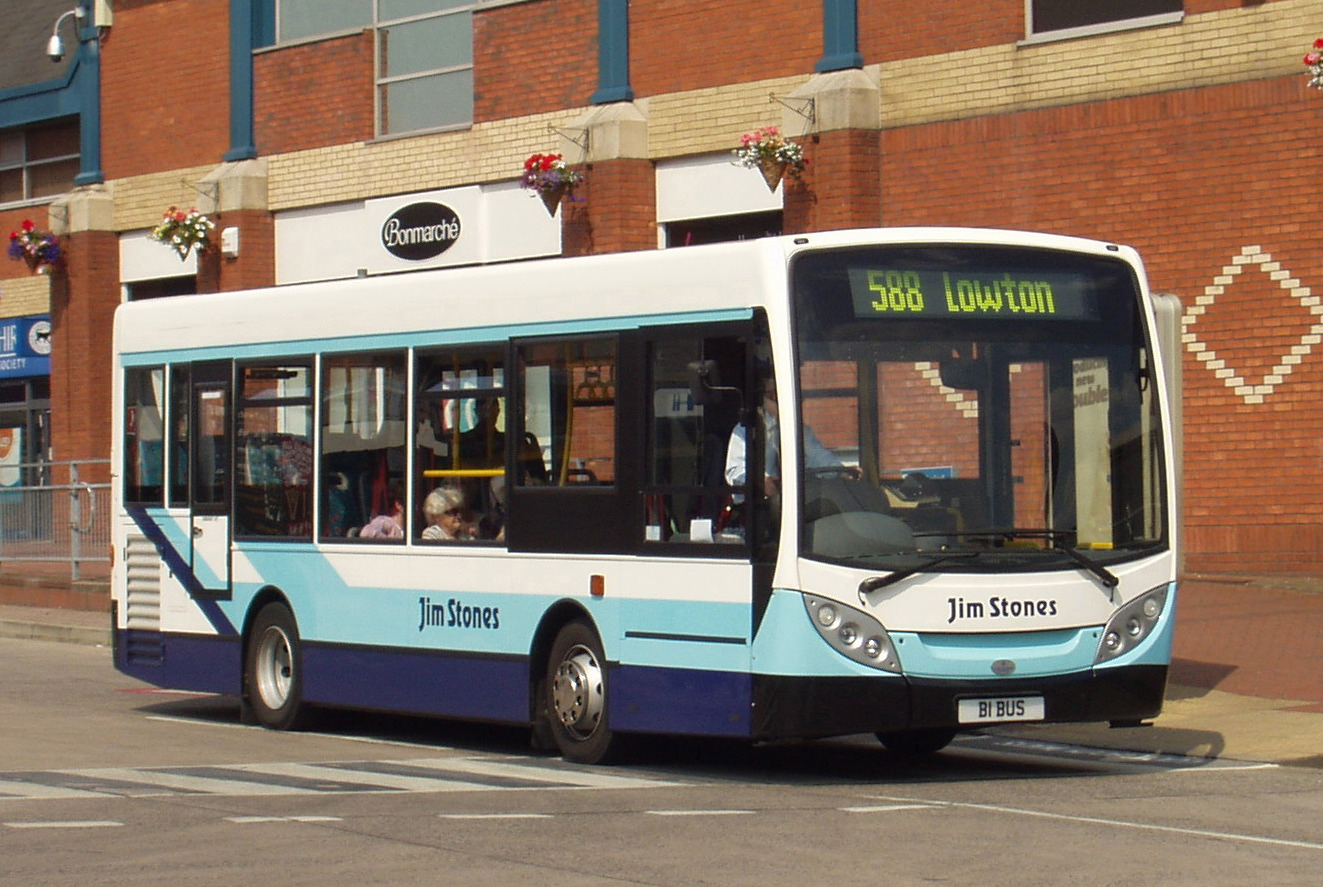
- Alexander Dennis Enviro200 at Leigh bus station in July 2011
- Parent: Jim Stones
- Founded: 1968; 58 years ago
- Defunct: 18 April 2020; 5 years ago
- Headquarters: Leigh
- Service area: Greater Manchester
- Service type: Bus services
- Routes: 11 (January 2020)
- Hubs: Leigh bus station
- Depots: 1
- Fleet: 9 (January 2020)
- Website: www.jimstonescoaches.com

Jim Stones Coaches was a bus operator that operated a number of commercial and supported routes on behalf of Transport for Greater Manchester in Leigh, Greater Manchester. The main hub was located in Leigh bus station.

== History ==
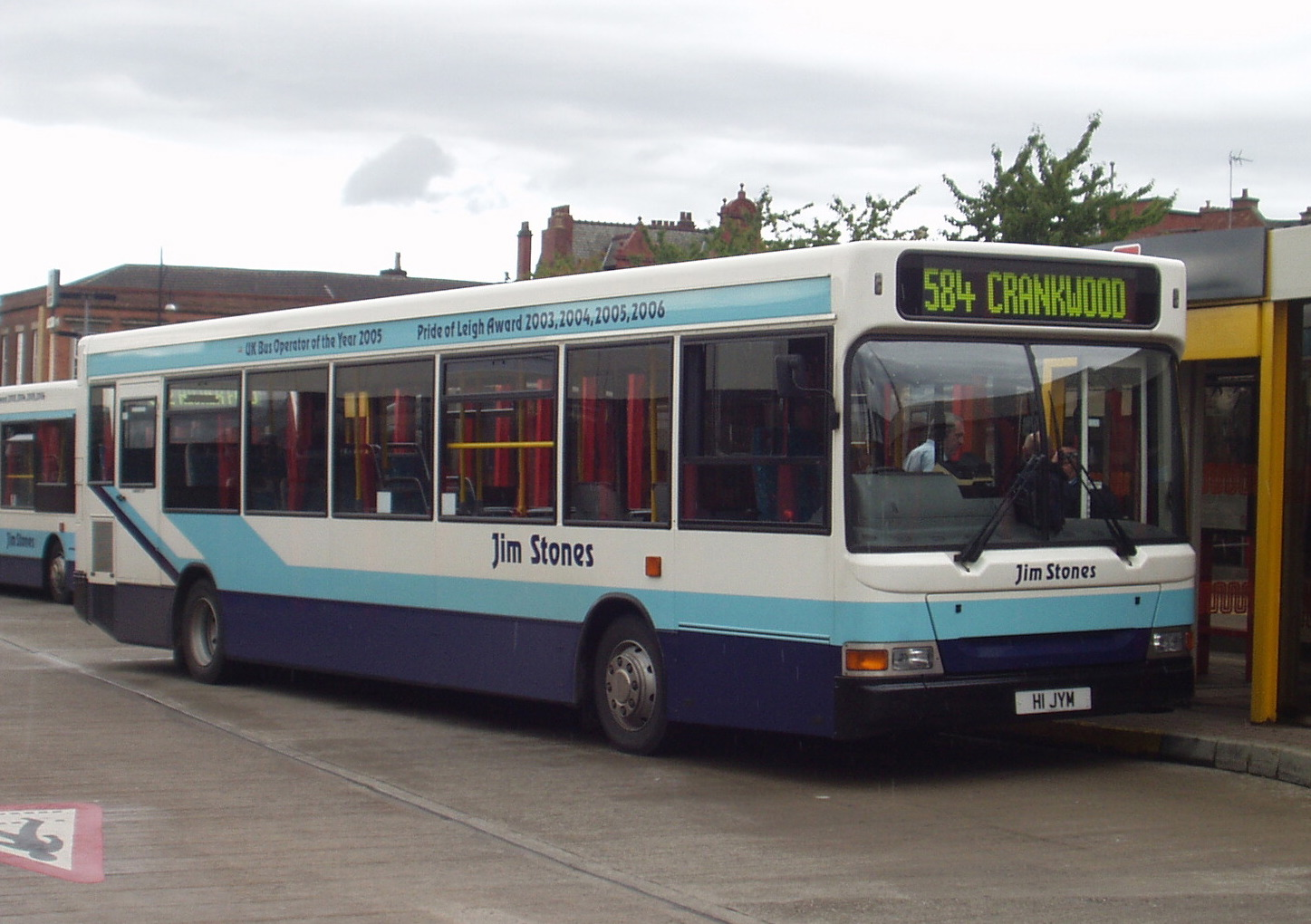
Plaxton Pointer bodied Dennis Dart SLF at Leigh bus station in August 2009

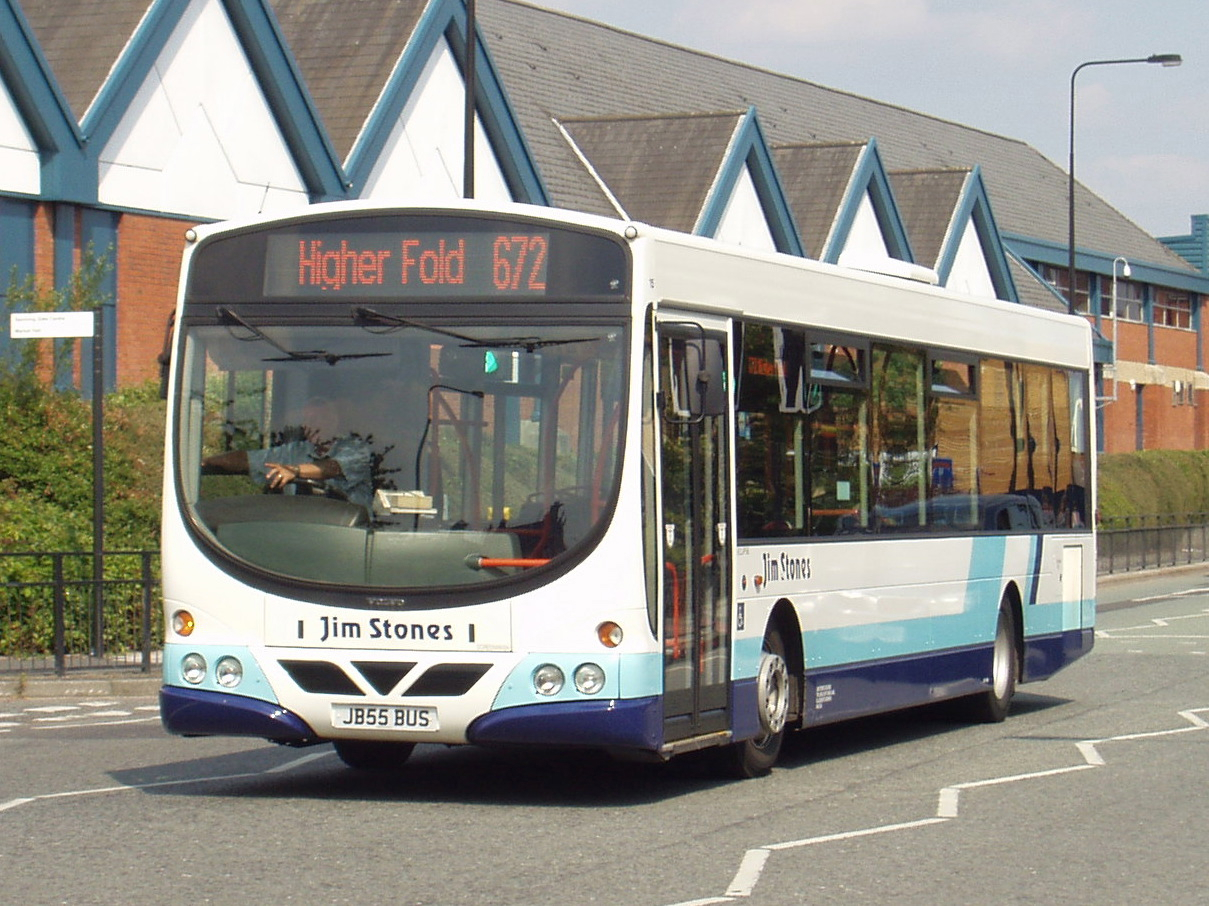
Wright Eclipse bodied Volvo B7RLE at Leigh bus station in July 2011

Jim Stones Coaches was established in 1968 as a charter operator. Upon the bus deregulation in October 1986 the company started bus operations with two routes, 596 from Leigh to Landside and 599 from Leigh to Higher Folds. The company expanded operations by filling the bus network where the larger incumbent operator GM Buses retracted services, as well as winning school and tendered contract services from Transport for Greater Manchester. In January 2020, Jim Stones announced his intention to retire with operations ceasing on 18 April 2020. Diamond North West, Vision Bus and Warrington's Own Buses took over the services.

== Services ==
As of January 2020, nine routes and two school bus services were operated.

== Fleet ==
As of January 2020, the fleet consisted of eight Alexander Dennis Enviro200s and one heritage Leyland-DAB Tiger Cub. Fleet livery was a white upper body separated by light blue stripes from much darker blue lower panels.
