= Alexander Dennis Enviro200 =

British single-deck midibus

Alexander Dennis Enviro200 Dart NewFlyer MiDi
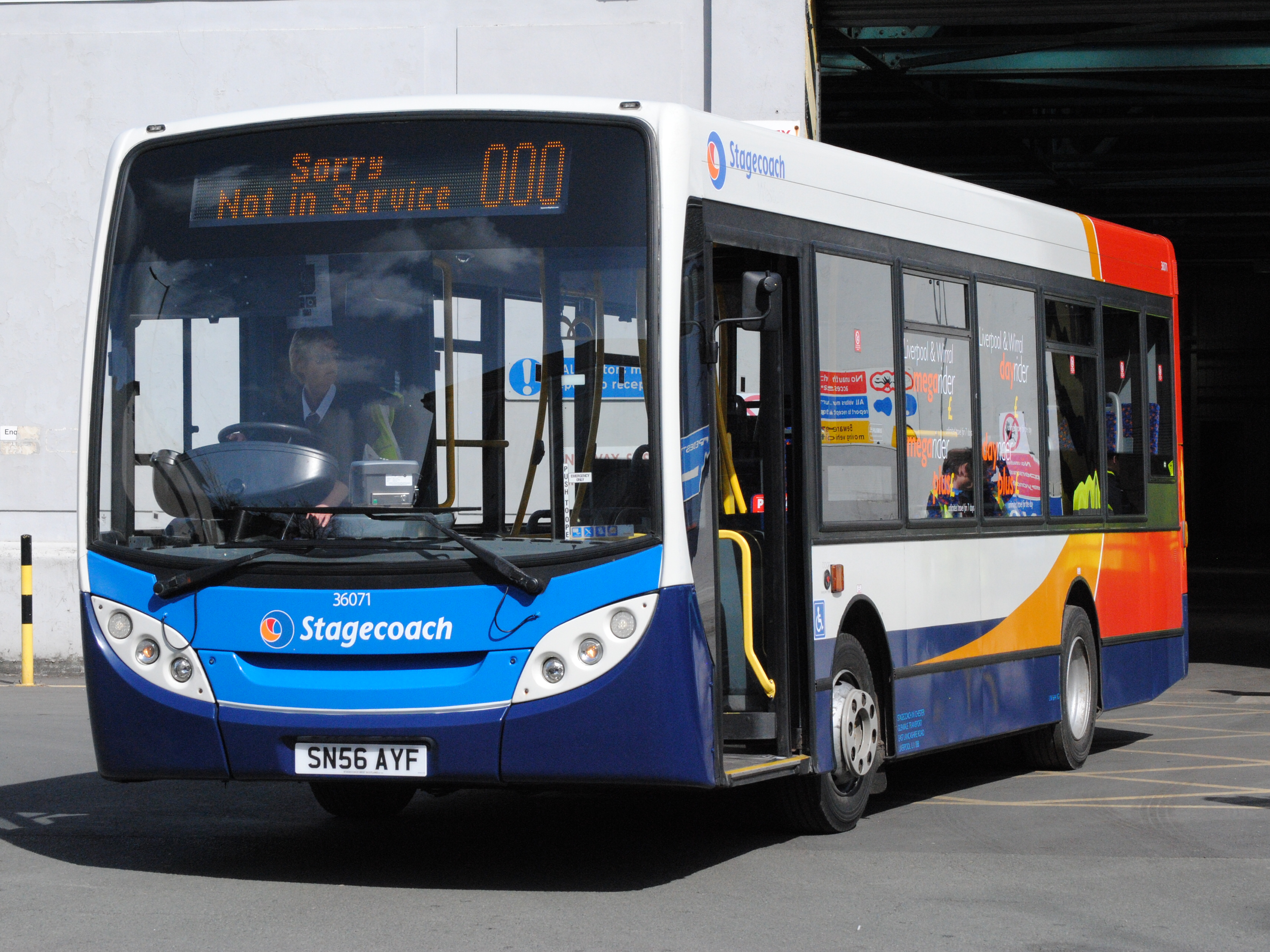
- An Enviro200 Dart operated by Stagecoach Merseyside

Overview
- Manufacturer: Alexander Dennis
- Production: 2003–2018

Body and chassis
- Doors: 1 or 2 doors
- Floor type: Low floor
- Chassis: Alexander Dennis Enviro200; MAN 14.240

Powertrain
- Engine: Cummins ISBe (Enviro200); MAN D0836 LOH 52 (MAN 14.240)
- Capacity: Various, dependent on length and specification
- Power output: 140 hp (100 kW) to 240 hp (180 kW)
- Transmission: Allison, Voith, ZF AS Tronic Lite, BAE Systems HybriDrive

Dimensions
- Length: 8.9 to 11.8 m (29 to 39 ft)
- Width: 2,440 mm (8.01 ft)
- Height: 2,860 mm (9.38 ft)
- Curb weight: 13–14.4 tonnes (gross)

Chronology
- Predecessor: Dennis Dart SLF; Alexander ALX200; Plaxton Pointer
- Successor: Alexander Dennis Enviro200 MMC

The Alexander Dennis Enviro200 (previously known as the TransBus Enviro200) is a midibus that was manufactured by TransBus International and later Alexander Dennis between 2003 and 2018. The original TransBus Enviro200 design was innovative but ultimately unsuccessful, with few being sold before the introduction of the second generation Enviro200 (originally referred to as the Enviro200 Dart) revived sales for the product from 2006. It was supposed to be positioned in between a minibus and a rigid single-decker bus.

The Enviro200 was originally designed to be the replacement for the Dennis Dart SLF chassis and Alexander ALX200 and Plaxton Pointer 2 bodies. The Enviro200 MMC was launched in 2014, eventually replacing the original Enviro200 and Enviro300, which went out of production in 2018 and 2016 respectively.

Over 6,000 Enviro200s had been built as of July 2017. From 2017, the Enviro200 was also marketed in North America. Previously, a licence-built version of the model was built by New Flyer Industries and branded the MiDi.

== First generation (2003–2007) ==
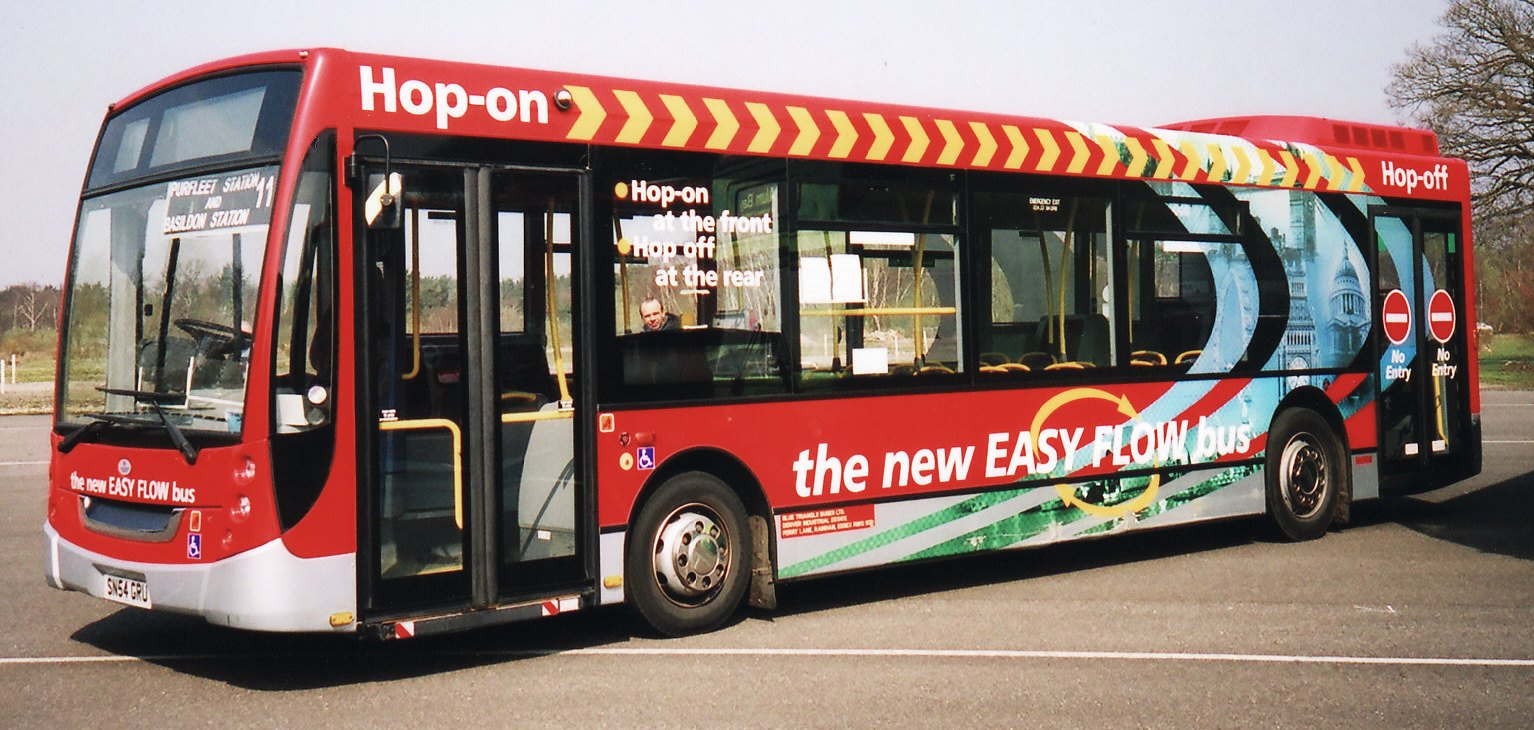
First generation Enviro200 at the 2007 Cobham Bus Rally

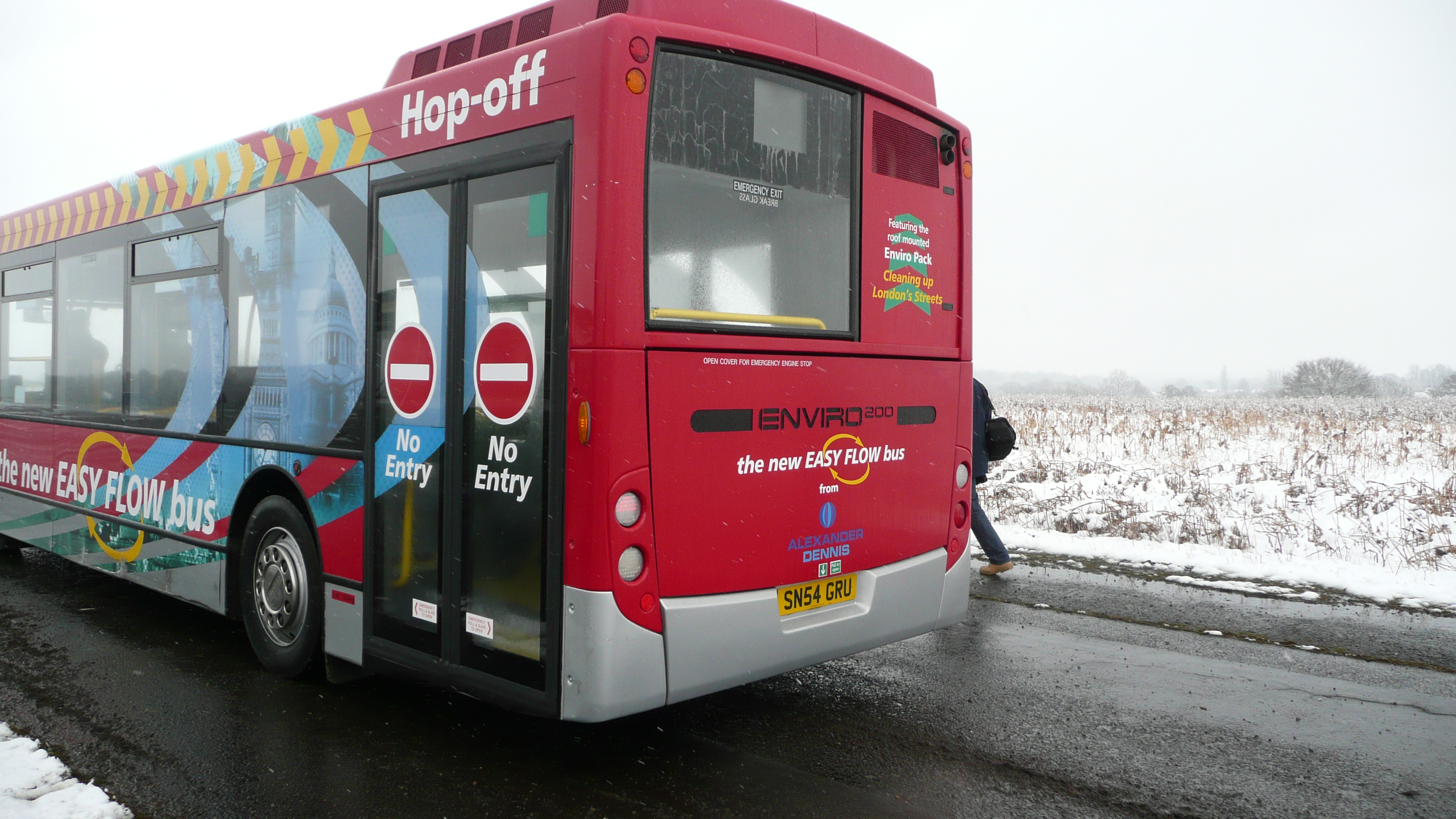
Rear view of a first generation Enviro200H, showing how the rear plug doors are arranged. This arrangement proved unpopular, and the type was a commercial failure.

The first generation Enviro200, then known as the TransBus Enviro200, was unveiled at Coach & Bus 2003 by the vehicle's then-manufacturer, TransBus International. Two diesel demonstrator buses were initially produced for display in 2003.

The first generation Enviro200 was unique in that it had a door both at the front and at the rear of the bus, as such a layout is rare in the UK – most dual-door buses in the UK have a door at the front and another door around the centre of the bus. This door layout was achieved by placing the engine vertically at the rear offside together with other driveline components, which also created a full low floor layout, common on buses in Continental Europe. An "Enviro Pack" mounted to the roof was also incorporated, intended to vent exhaust emissions, noise and heat away from ground level and thus alighting passengers. The design meant that the Enviro200, 2.4 m (7 ft 10 in) and optioned at either 10.5 m (34 ft 5 in) or 11.1 m (36 ft 5 in) long, could hold up to 25% more passengers than a vehicle of equivalent dimensions (10.4 m (34 ft 1 in) long, 2.4 m (7 ft 10 in) wide), with a capacity of 77, with 27 seated.

A single demonstrator of the hybrid variant, the Enviro200H, was produced in 2004 and entered long-term trials in London; however the unconventional engine and door layout, combined with the collapse of TransBus International in 2004, led to the type's commercial failure. As a result, it was the VDL SB120-based Wright Electrocity hybrid electric single-decker bus that was ordered instead by many operators.

Following the collapse of TransBus, the Enviro200 was rebranded as the Alexander Dennis Enviro200 by Alexander Dennis, the successor to TransBus. Only two more first generation Enviro200s were built following the collapse of TransBus, one diesel and one hybrid vehicle, delivered to Far East Travel of Ipswich in early 2007. This pair, and the original London demonstrator, have since passed to Buses Excetera of Guildford.

The first generation Enviro200 was offered alongside the second generation Enviro200 Dart for a time, but received no further orders following 2007 and was retired in favour of the new model. Only five examples were built and only one is known to exist today being the sole hybrid demonstrator for London, SN54 GRU. It was converted to diesel during its working life after its life as a demonstrator and is currently being restored.

== Second generation (2006–2011) ==
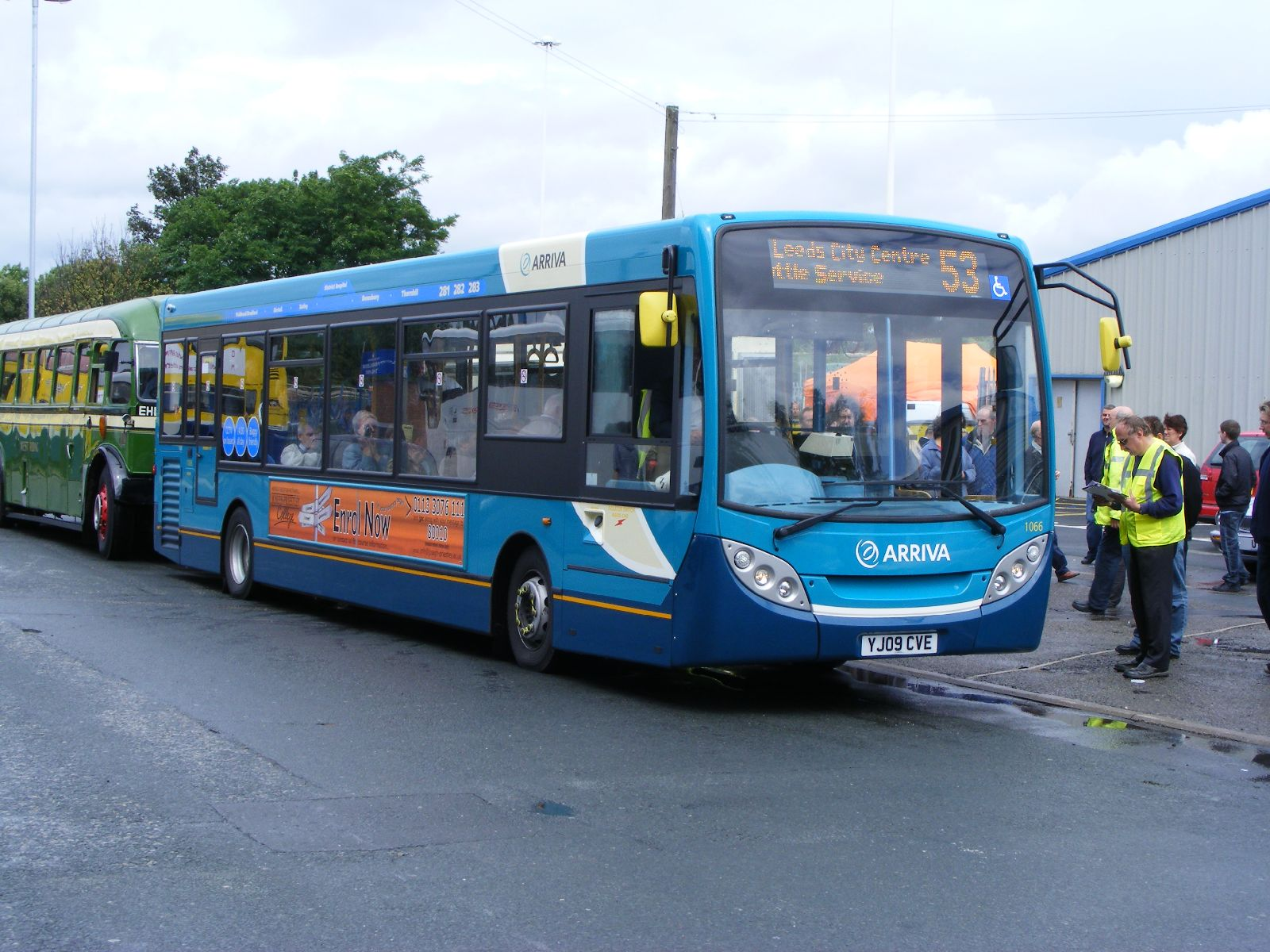
A second generation Enviro200 operated by Arriva Yorkshire

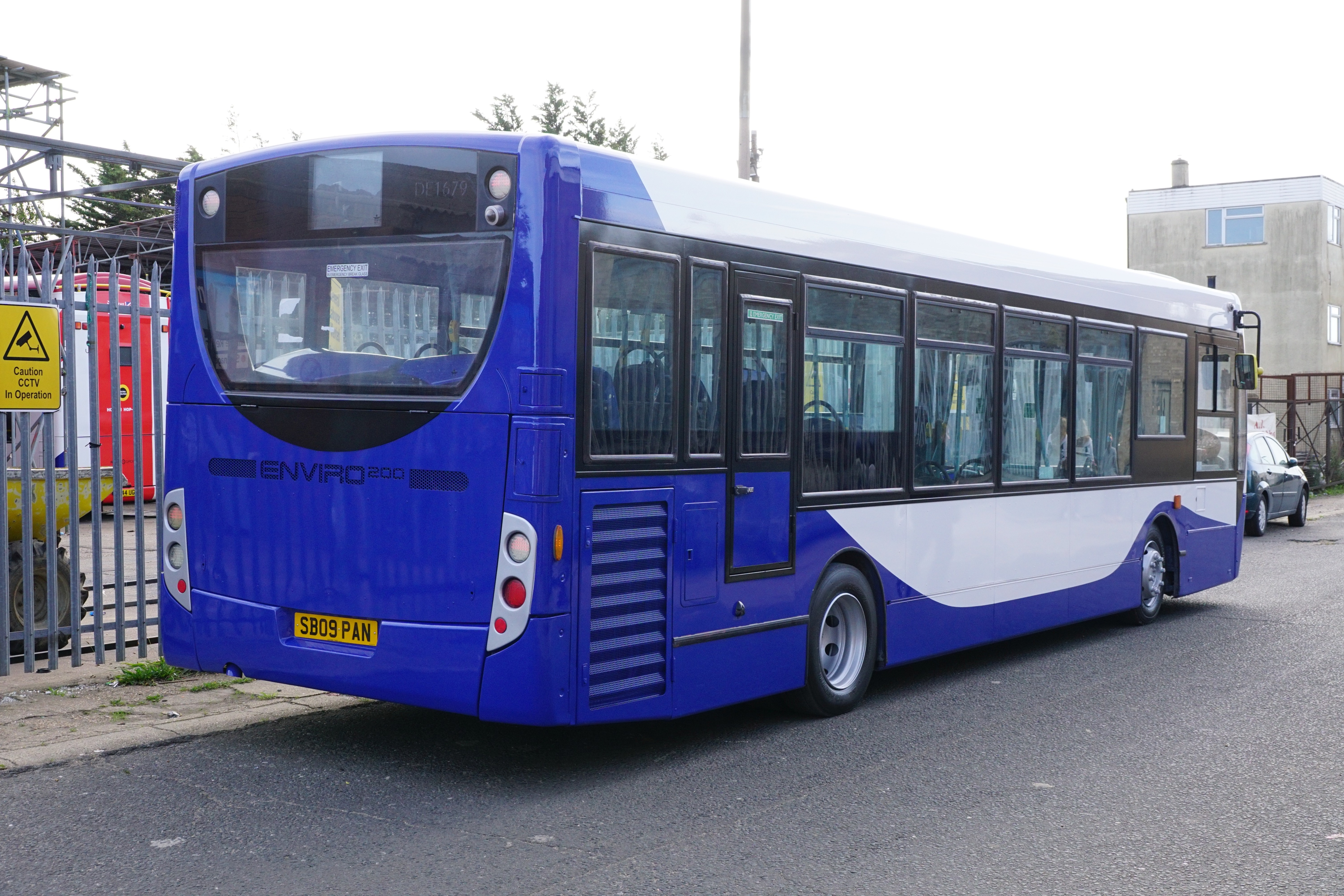
Rear of a second generation Enviro200 operated by Panther Travel

The second generation Enviro200, also known as the Alexander Dennis Enviro200 Dart, was launched in August 2006. The Dart moniker – in reference to the Dennis Dart, from which the Enviro200 Dart was developed – was added in order to prevent confusion with the first generation TransBus Enviro200, which remained in production alongside the Enviro200 Dart for a time.

The second generation Enviro200 retained the conventional rear-engined layout of the Dennis Dart, and was offered with a choice of four or six-cylinder Cummins ISBe Euro IV engines with a range of transmission options, and featured new front and rear axles. It also offered the same seating capacity of the Plaxton Pointer and Alexander ALX200 (which it ultimately replaced) at launch, but with more fixed seats rather than 'tip up' seats for each length. The vehicle also featured the same cab as the Enviro300 and the double-decker Enviro400 and had an integrated chassis, body multiplexing and cantilevered seats to reduce weight. Externally, the bus could be optioned with either bonded or gasket window glazing, and featured the same front panels as the Enviro300 and Enviro400 to project a "family look" onto the Enviro range.

The Enviro200 chassis was soon made available with Optare Esteem and MCV Evolution bodywork; this was followed in February 2007 by the launch of the Enviro200 body on MAN 14.240 chassis. This gave prospective operators the option of EGR emissions reduction for the Enviro200, as some operators preferred this technology to Cummins' SCR used on the integral design.

In August 2007, due to significant orders for the Enviro400, Alexander Dennis announced that the production of Enviro200 would be moved from its plant at Falkirk to the recently acquired Plaxton factory at Scarborough. This meant that the Scarborough factory would once again be producing the bodywork for a variation of the Dart chassis, while also producing the bodywork for the MAN 14.240 with both Plaxton Centro and Enviro200 bodies simultaneously.

In 2008, Alexander Dennis unveiled the hybrid-electric powered version of Enviro200, known as the Enviro200H, using BAE Systems's HybriDrive series drive system with the Cummins ISBe 4-cylinder engine fitted for power generation. This model was more successful than the original hybrid Enviro200, albeit only by selling five examples to London United for use on route 371 and nine to the Strathclyde Partnership for Transport, with five operated by Henderson Travel of Hamilton and the remaining four operated by Colchri Coaches of Renfrew.

=== Operators ===
Following the Enviro200's launch, 60 orders were confirmed to have been placed, with the first production Enviro200 being delivered to Jim Stones Coaches, an independent operator based in Leigh, Greater Manchester. Further orders from this first batch of 60 were delivered to Alliance & Leicester bank's vehicle rental operation, Travel London, Stagecoach London and Plymouth Citybus, with the remaining eleven for Epsom Coaches delivered with East Lancs Esteem bodies.

== Third generation (2009–2018) ==
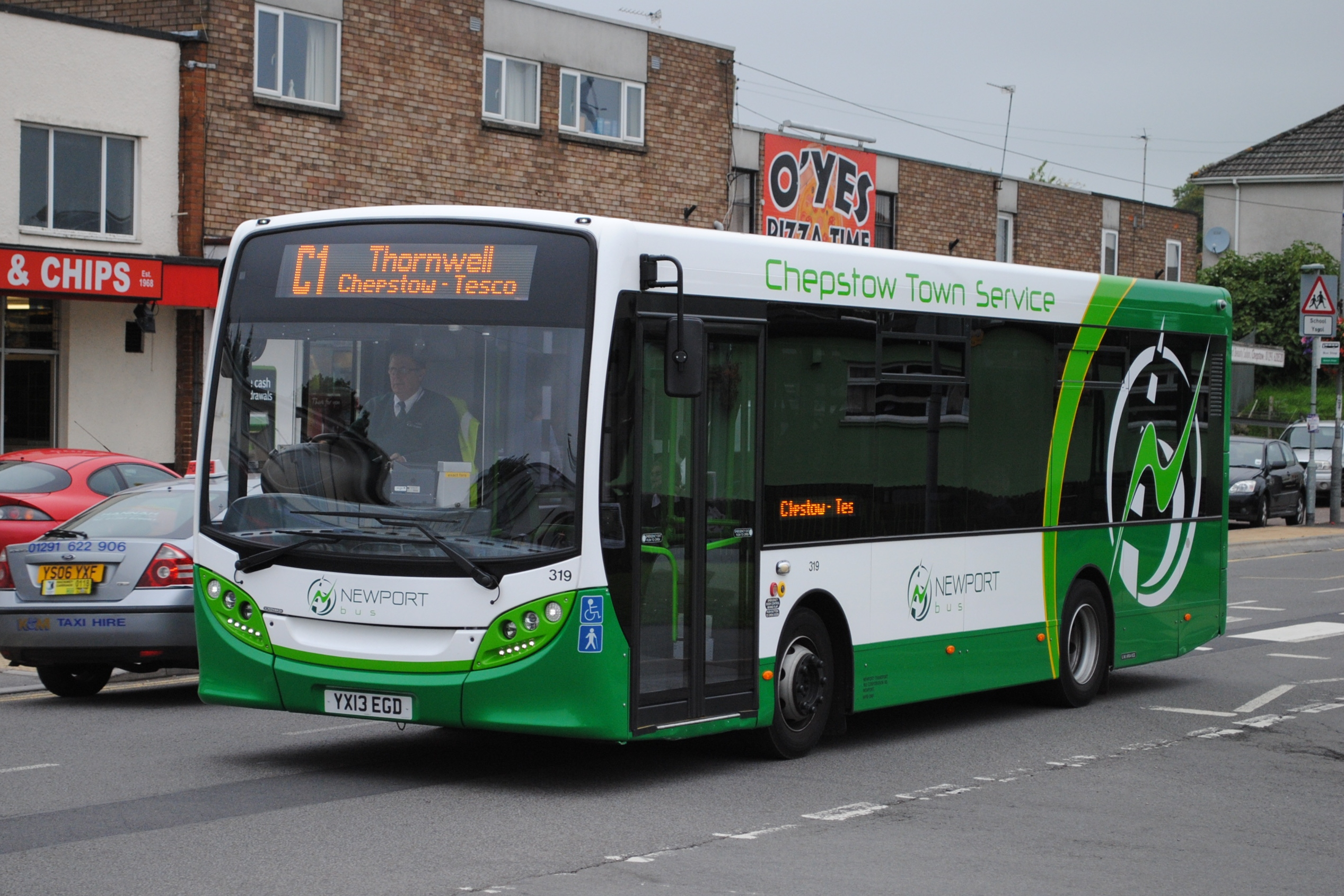
Newport Transport third generation Enviro200, showing the optional LED lights below the headlights

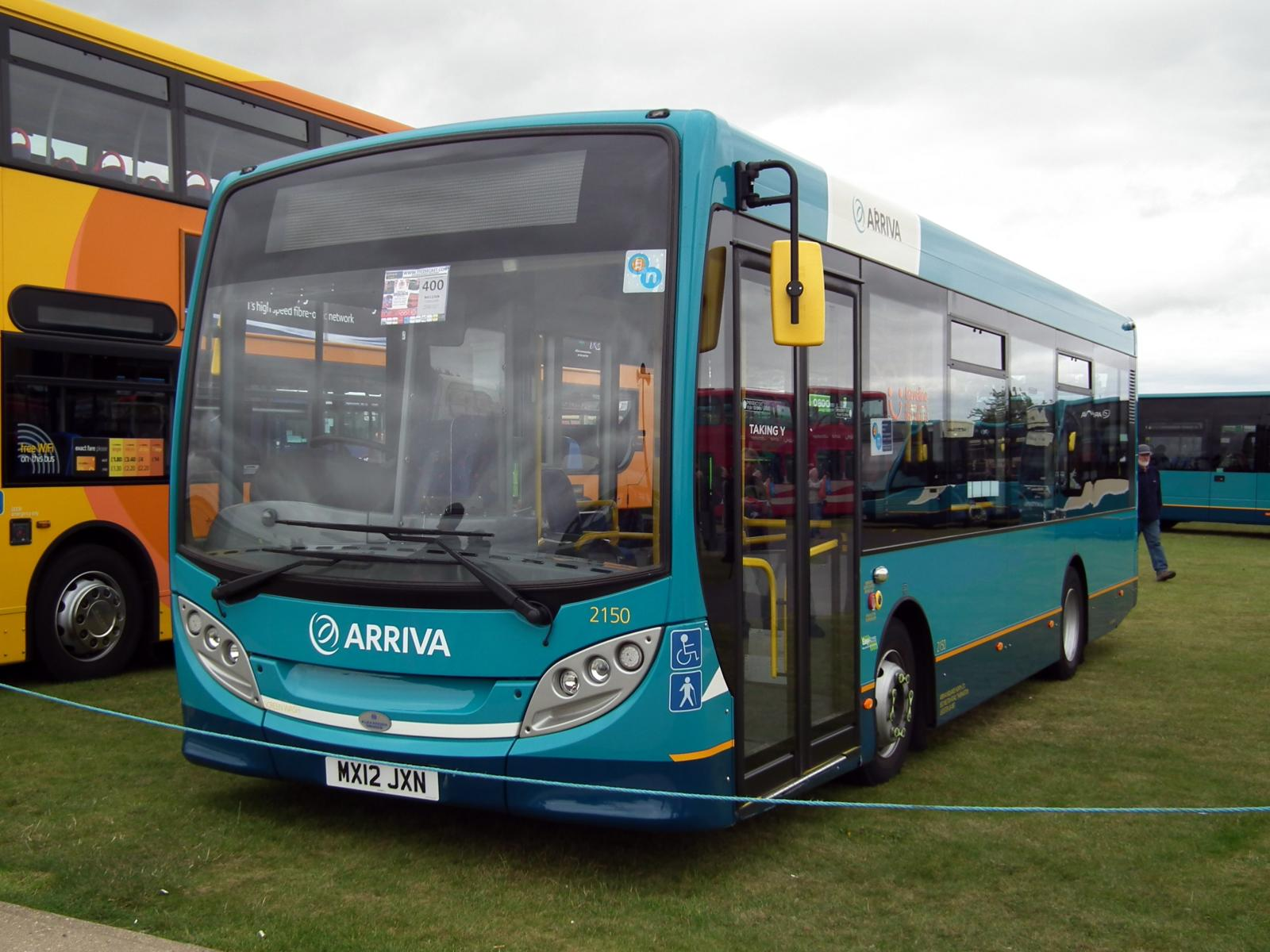
Arriva Midlands third generation Enviro200, showing a blank space below the headlights

In 2009, the third generation Enviro200 was launched, dropping the Dart moniker from the previous model. Compared to the previous model, the third generation Enviro200 received a major chassis redesign, including a front-end facelift in order to allow the type to comply with European Community Whole Vehicle Type Approval (ECWVTA) regulations. Some of the major external changes included the introduction of white LED daytime running lights below the headlights, the relocation of the offside emergency door, redesigned front and rear bumpers and the introduction of several new Enviro200 lengths. Additionally, the third generation Enviro200 introduced a Euro V-compliant drivetrain.

In 2014, Alexander Dennis made changes to the running units of the third-generation Enviro200, which allowed for it to achieve 13% in fuel savings, qualifying the bus for low carbon certification and a subsequent 6p uplift in Bus Service Operators Grant (BSOG) purchase funding. The Allison automatic transmission was replaced with a ZF AS-Lite automated manual transmission, while the torque converter was replaced with both an electronically controlled clutch and a true neutral gear, removing the need for moving parts while parked in neutral.

Later in 2014, Alexander Dennis introduced the Enviro200 MMC (Major Model Change) as the Enviro200's eventual replacement. Production of the original Enviro200 alongside the Enviro200 MMC continued for a time, with the third generation Enviro200 referred to by Alexander Dennis as the Enviro200 Classic from 2015. Production of the third generation Enviro200 ceased in late 2018.

== Exports ==
While most Enviro200s have been for British operators, numerous examples have been exported to Australia, Hong Kong, Malaysia, New Zealand and Spain. The first of these was in January 2007, when the Kowloon-Canton Railway Corporation of Hong Kong ordered 11 11.3 metres (37 ft) Enviro200s for delivery to its MTR Bus operation in 2008.

=== North America ===
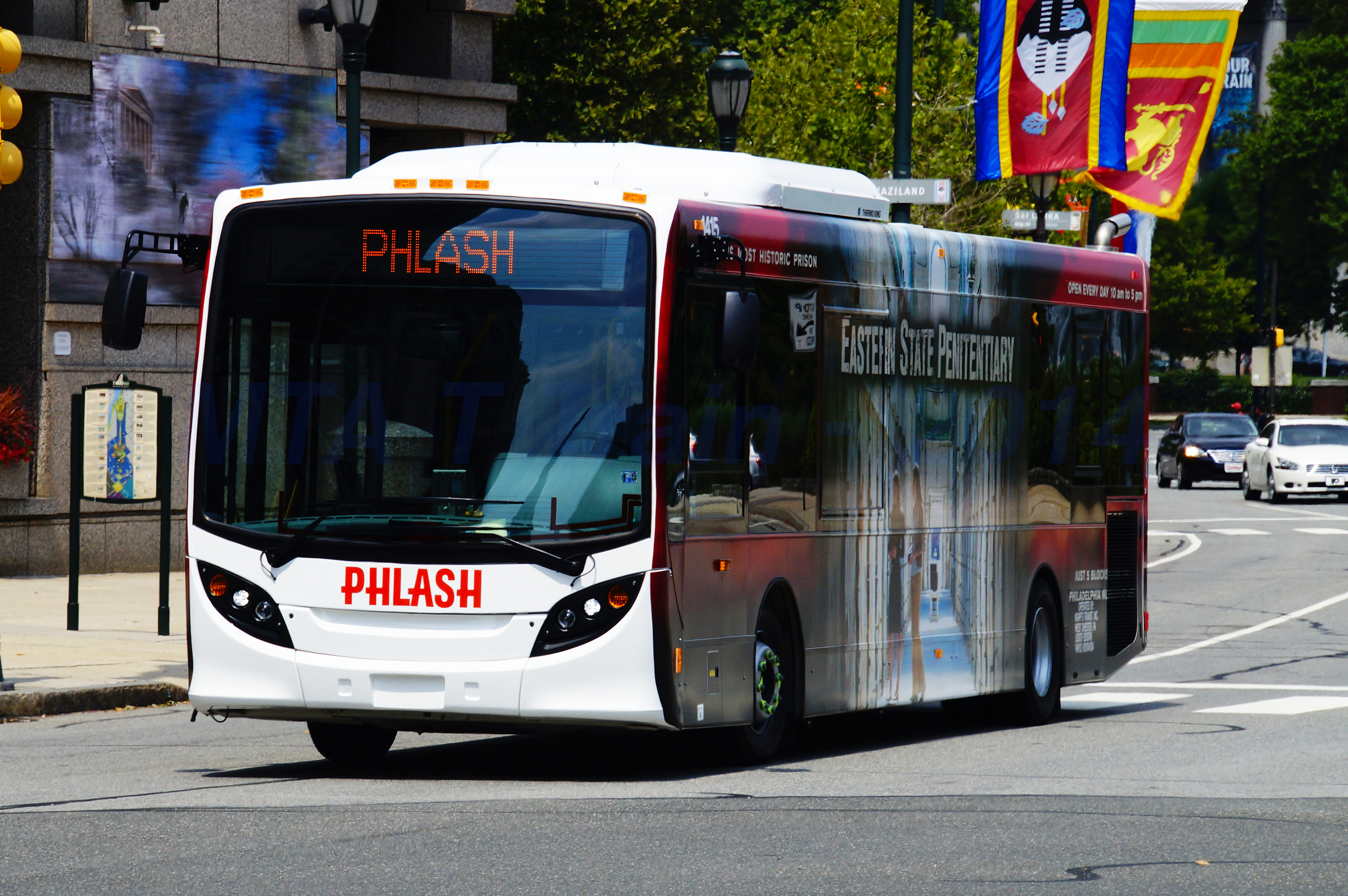
A Philly Phlash New Flyer MiDi bus in Philadelphia

In May 2012, Canadian bus manufacturer New Flyer introduced a license-built version of the third generation Enviro200 as the New Flyer MiDi, modified for the North American market. New Flyer estimated the size of the medium-sized bus market at approximately 1,000 units per year.

Initially the MiDi was built at the New Flyer factory in St. Cloud, Minnesota. In May 2017 production was transferred to Alexander Dennis's own facility in Nappanee, Indiana, which manufactured the North American variant of the Enviro500 double-decker bus since 2014. The bus now carries the same Enviro200 branding as the international version, and is fully "Buy America" compliant.

Currently, the third-generation North American Enviro200 bus is offered in 30-foot (9.1 m) and 35-foot (10.7 m) lengths, with or without a rear exit door, equipped with a 250-hp Cummins ISB engine and an Allison B300R 6-speed transmission.

=== Australia ===
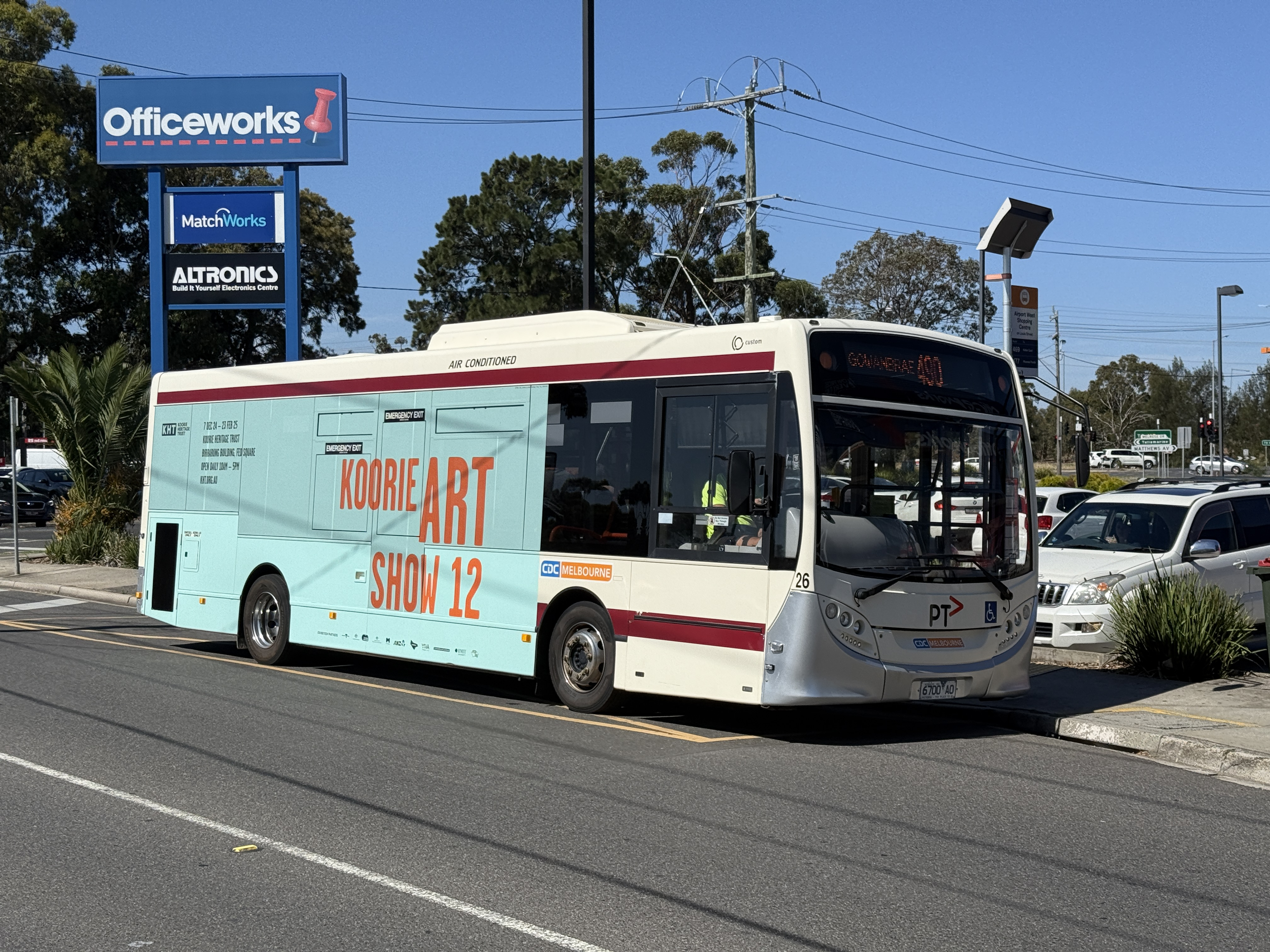
CDC Melbourne Custom Coaches-assembled Enviro200 in Melbourne in January 2025

In June 2012, Alexander Dennis acquired Australian bus body manufacturer Custom Coaches. Alexander Dennis and Custom Coaches then begin producing Enviro200 buses. The buses were exported in knock-down kit form from the United Kingdom and then assembled in Custom Coaches' plant in Villawood, Sydney. They differ from the United Kingdom version in not having a rear window in order to provide extra advertising space. Enviro200 buses were delivered to operators such as Tullamarine Bus Lines (now CDC Melbourne) and Shoal Bus in New South Wales' South Coast.

Custom Coaches stopped assembling Enviro200 buses after it went into administration in May 2014. At the time, it is estimated that Custom Coaches only made five Enviro200 buses during the two-year period under Alexander Dennis' ownership. Custom Coaches was then sold by Alexander Dennis back to its previous owners in August that year.

=== New Zealand ===
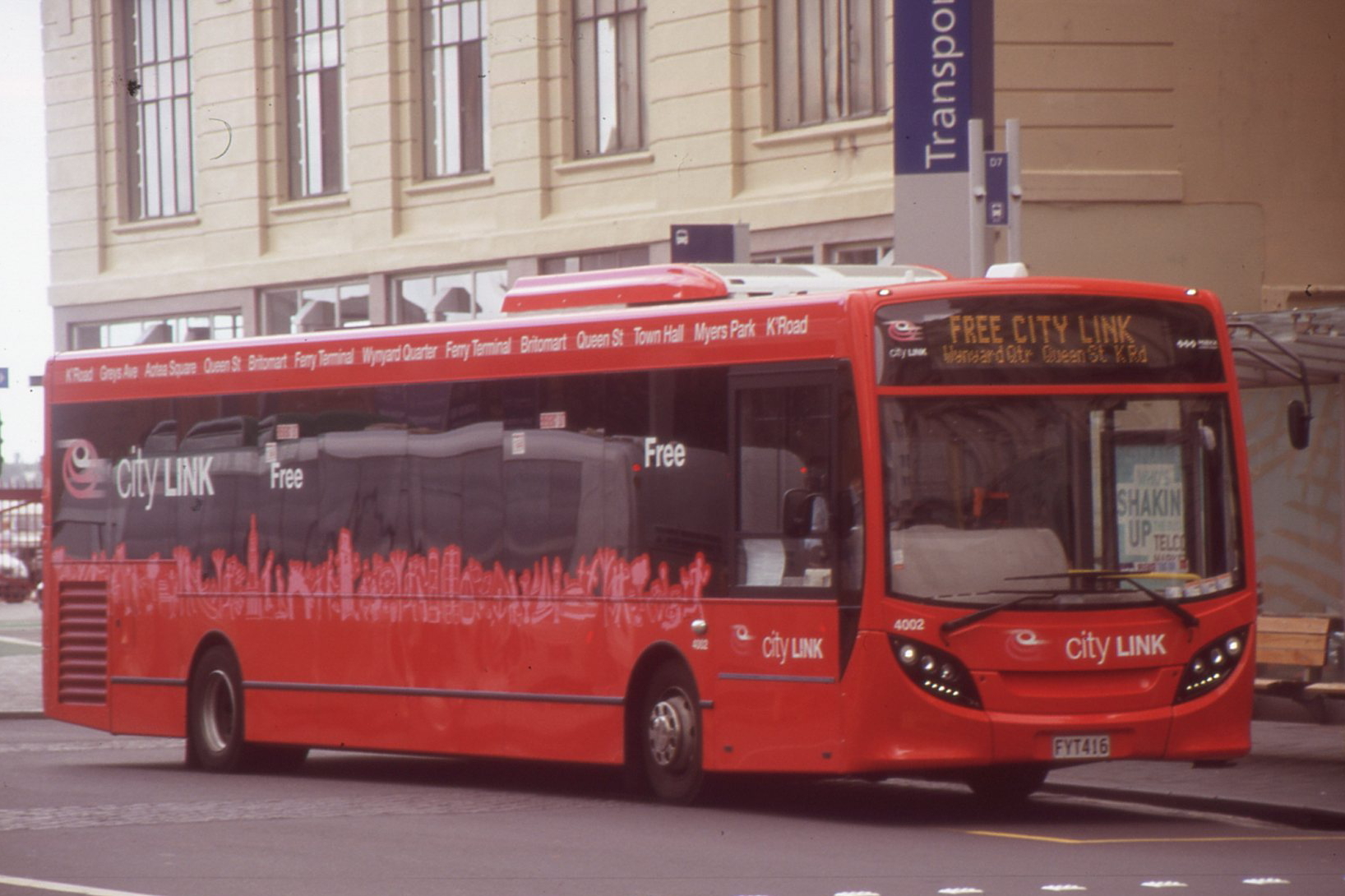
NZ Bus Enviro200 in New Zealand in June 2012

In New Zealand, investment company Infratil's NZ Bus operation ordered its first 118 Enviro200s in January 2011, with the chassis built by Alexander Dennis then exported in knock-down kit form for completion by Kiwi Bus Builders of Tauranga. The first batches of NZ Bus Enviro200s were delivered for use in Auckland during June. A further 232 were later delivered to NZ Bus operations between 2011 and 2015.

In 2011, eight Enviro200s were deployed to NZ Bus' CityLink route in Auckland, with fifteen each being deployed to the then new OuterLink and the InnerLink. Around 2015, Infratril sold 21 Enviro200s to Pavlovich Coachlines, and later sold five to Ritchies Transport. The remaining 328 were distributed across the NZ Bus operation, with 196 delivered to Auckland, 113 delivered to Tauranga for Bay Hopper services, and the remaining nineteen delivered to the capital, Wellington, for GO Wellington services.

== See also ==
- List of buses
