= Alexander Dennis Enviro100EV =

Battery-electric midibus

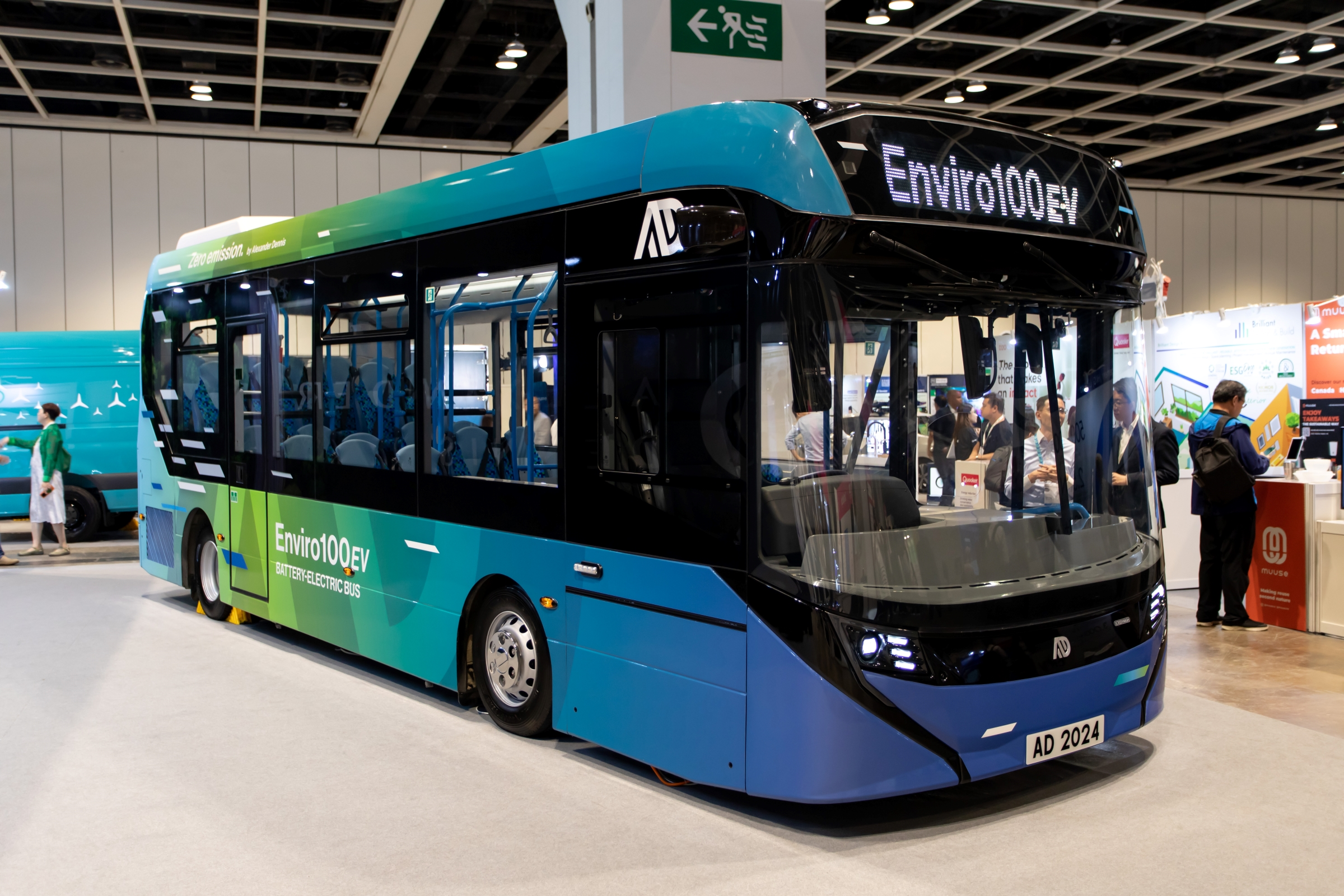
- Enviro100EV demonstrator on display in Hong Kong in September 2024

Overview
- Manufacturer: Alexander Dennis
- Production: 2023–present
- Assembly: Body: Zhuhai, China; Chassis: Scarborough, England

Body and chassis
- Doors: 1
- Floor type: Low floor
- Chassis: Integral
- Related: Alexander Dennis Enviro400EV; Alexander Dennis Enviro200EV

Powertrain
- Electric motor: Voith Electrical Drive System (VEDS) MD
- Capacity: 45 (25 seated, 20 standing)
- Power output: 260 kW peak, 230 kW continuous
- Battery: 236/354 kWh NMC
- Range: 190–285 mi (306–459 km)

Dimensions
- Wheelbase: 4.5 m (14 ft 9 in)
- Length: 8.5 m (27 ft 11 in)
- Width: 2.35 m (7 ft 9 in)
- Height: 3.1 m (10 ft 2 in)

The Alexander Dennis Enviro100EV is a battery electric integral midibus built by British bus manufacturer Alexander Dennis. It is the first midibus produced by the company equipped with Alexander Dennis' own in-house electric drivetrain, complementing the Enviro200EV in the Alexander Dennis product range. The body of the bus is assembled in Zhuhai in China, after which it is sent for assembly on the chassis of the bus at the Alexander Dennis factory in Scarborough in England.

The Enviro100EV was announced as a new model in the Alexander Dennis range on 1 November 2022 at the Euro Bus Expo at the National Exhibition Centre in Birmingham, England, with the first production model unveiled a year later on 1 November 2023. The bus is primarily marketed at smaller bus operators running bus services in rural areas, although a Transport for London specification Enviro100EV was introduced in mid-2024. Seatbelts were introduced as an option during 2026, while Alexander Dennis announced in November 2026 it was exploring plans to export the Enviro100EV to continental European and North American markets.

== Operators ==
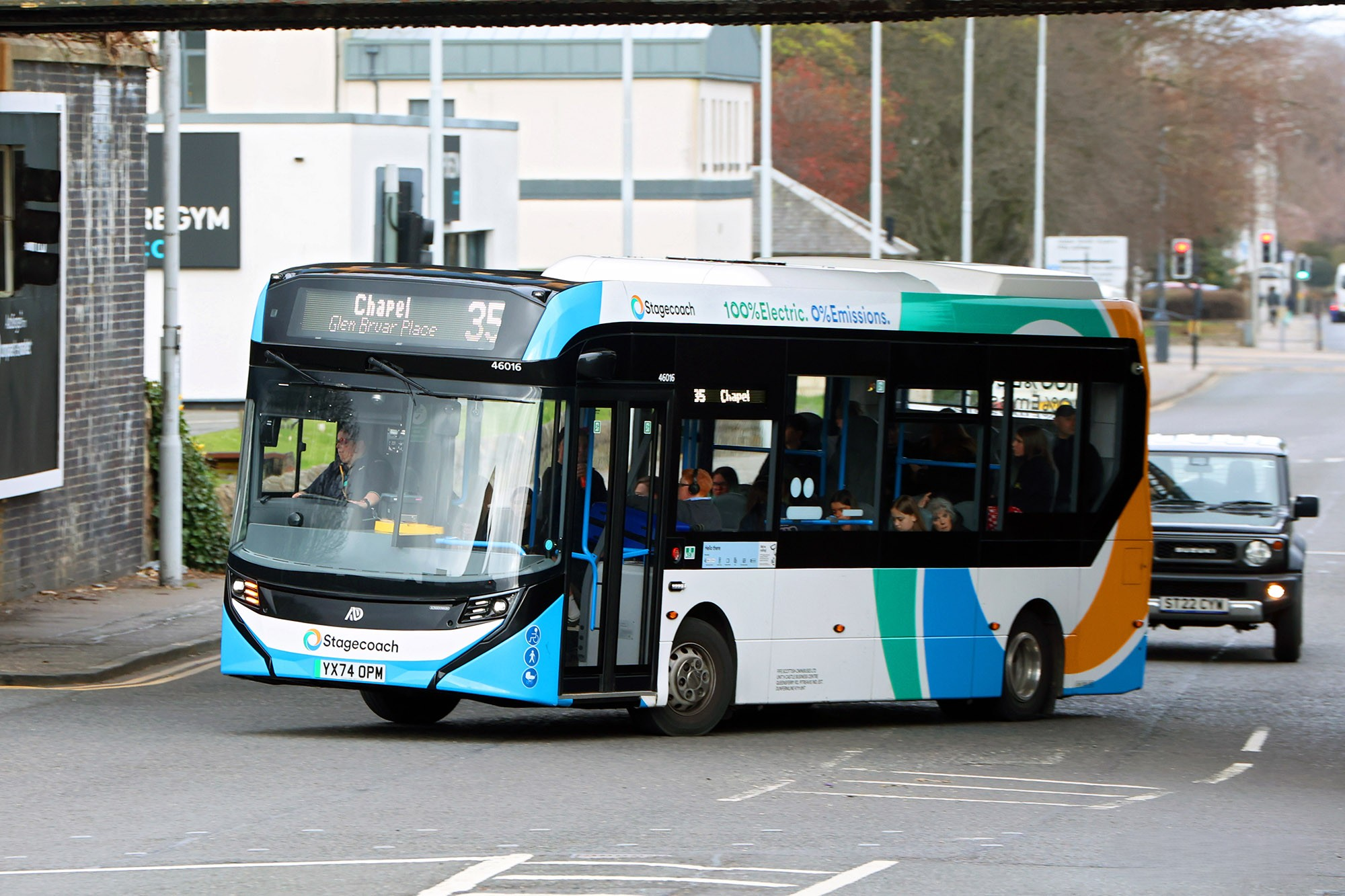
Stagecoach East Scotland Enviro100EV in Fife in April 2025

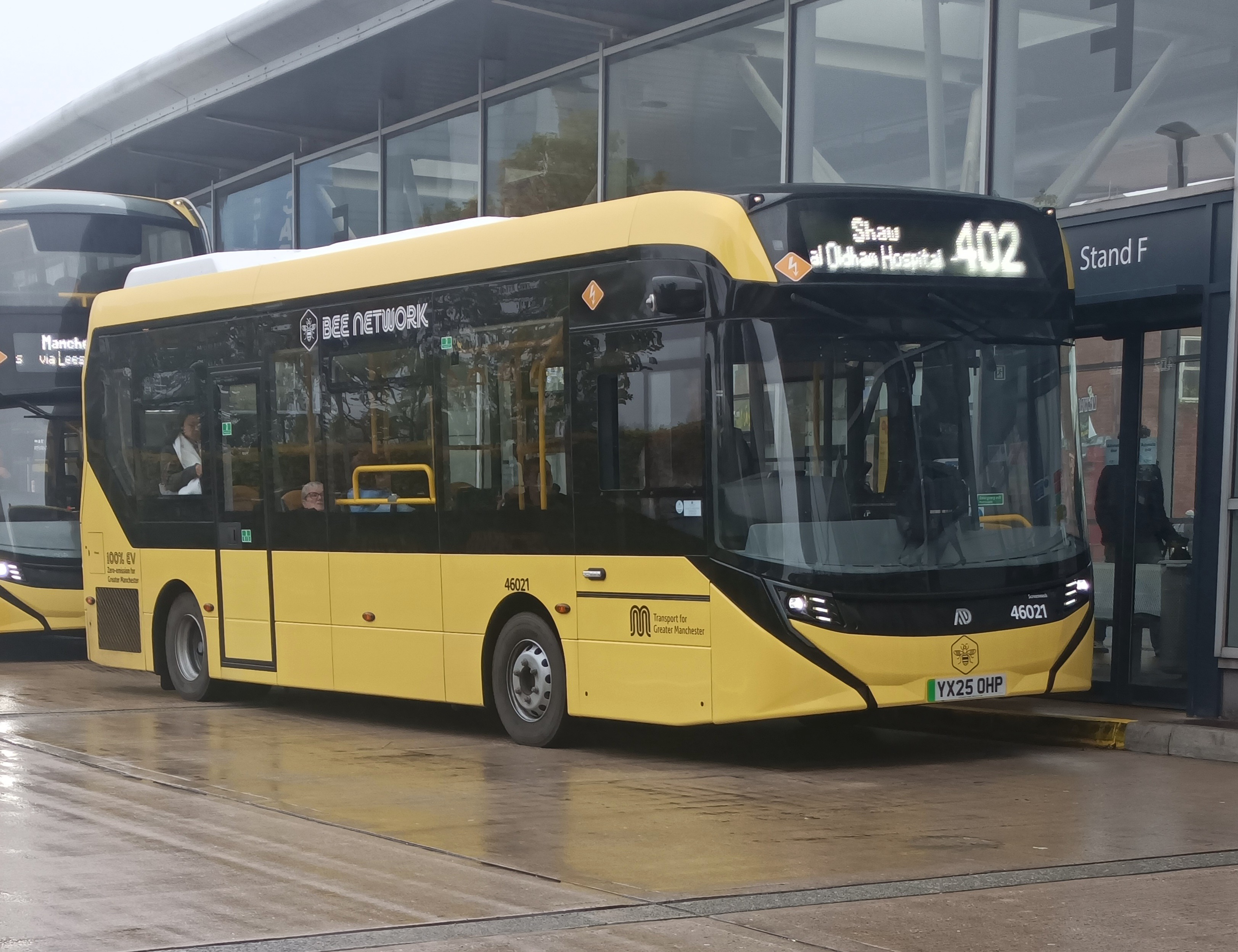
Stagecoach Manchester Enviro100EV at Oldham Bus Station in October 2025

The Stagecoach Group was the launch customer for the Enviro100EV, with the first 12 production Enviro100EVs entering service with Stagecoach West Scotland in Ayr and Kilmarnock in October 2024. Eight were delivered to Stagecoach East Scotland by the end of 2024, while a further ten Enviro100EVs are to be delivered to Stagecoach South West during 2025 for use in Exeter and Torbay. First Bus, meanwhile, ordered five Enviro100EVs for delivery to First West of England in Bath during 2026, and Go-Ahead Group operator Salisbury Reds took delivery of three Enviro100EVs in March 2026.

In London, 24 Enviro100EVs were ordered by Stagecoach London in July 2024 for delivery during 2025, these being the first Enviro100EVs to be sold to a TfL bus contractor. These were followed in October 2024 with an order for 32 Enviro100EVs for delivery to Go-Ahead London's Orpington depot for service on routes 233, R1, R3, R4 and R8, followed by a further 13 for use on route 322, and Transport UK London Bus taking delivery of 13 between July and August 2025 for use on route G1. Four were also delivered to Stagecoach Manchester for use on franchised Bee Network bus services. Two were delivered to Stagecoach South West's Guernsey contract operation in February 2026, following a demonstrator Enviro100EV being evaluated without carrying passengers a year prior by previous operator CT Plus.

The first independent operator to order an Enviro100EV was Shuttle Buses of Kilwinning, who took delivery of a single example in December 2024. Dumfries and Galloway Council are to take delivery of three Enviro100EVs for its in-house DGC Buses company during 2026, each fitted with seatbelts and bicycle storage racks. The Liverpool City Region Combined Authority announced in September 2026 that it had ordered 30 Enviro100EVs for use on franchised Metro bus services.

An Enviro100EV demonstrator was exported to New Zealand in 2024, and from September 2025, began operations on trial with Ritchies Transport within the Auckland suburb of Albany.

=== Enviro100AEV ===
The Enviro100AEV is an SAE Level 4 autonomous variant of the standard Enviro100EV equipped with Fusion Processing's CAVStar Automated Drive System, which was first developed on the larger Alexander Dennis Enviro200AV conventional diesel bus. The first Enviro100AEV was ordered by Stagecoach East Scotland for service on CAVForth2, an extension of the original CAVForth scheme operated by five Enviro200AVs towards Dunfermline city centre via the Forth Road Bridge. The first of three Enviro100AEVs were delivered on lease to the Greater Cambridge Partnership in early 2025 for trial service on the Cambridge Connector network later in the year; these buses were originally intended to be operated by Stagecoach East until the Stagecoach Group withdrew support for the Cambridge Connector trial, eventually being reallocated to Ascendal Group-owned Whippet of Cambridge.

== See also ==
- List of buses
