= Alexander Dennis Enviro400EV =

Battery electric double-decker bus

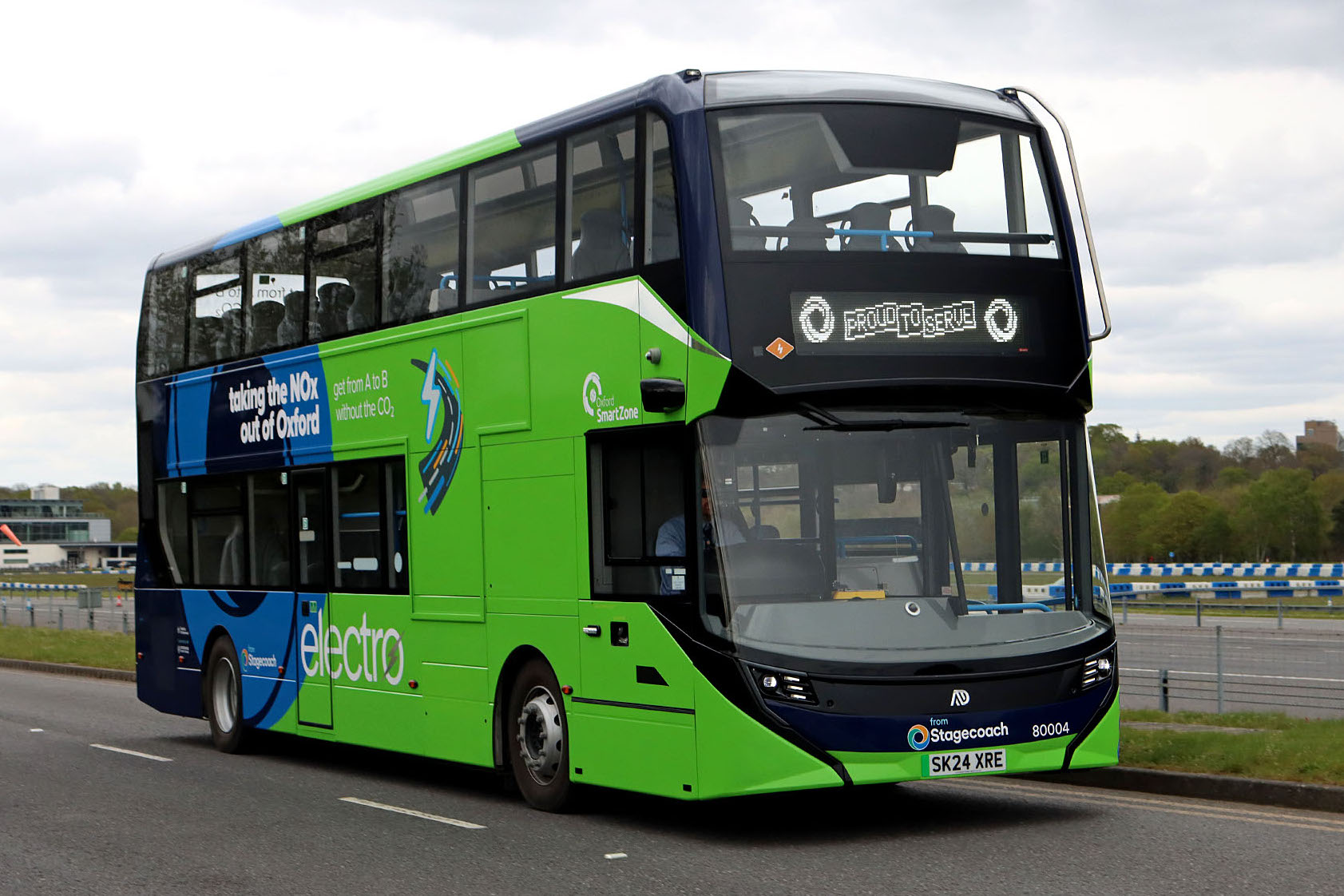
- Stagecoach West second-generation Alexander Dennis Enviro400EV at the London Bus Museum in April 2024

Overview
- Manufacturer: Alexander Dennis
- Production: 2018–2024 (BYD ADL E400EV); 2022–present (ADL E400FCEV); 2023–present (ADL E400EV)
- Assembly: Falkirk, Scotland; Scarborough, North Yorkshire, England

Body and chassis
- Doors: Single or dual door
- Floor type: Low floor
- Chassis: BYD K series (1st gen); Integral (2nd gen)
- Related: Alexander Dennis Enviro400 City

Powertrain
- Electric motor: 2 x BYD 150kW in-wheel (1st gen); Voith Electrical Drive System HD (2nd gen)
- Capacity: 64–72 seated
- Battery: 320 kWh LFP (1st gen); 354 kWh or 472 kWh NMC (2nd gen)
- Electric range: 160 miles (260 km) (1st gen); 385 miles (620 km) (2nd gen)

Dimensions
- Length: 10.3 m (33 ft 10 in) to 10.8 m (35 ft 5 in)
- Width: 2.55 m (8 ft 4 in)
- Height: 4.2 m (13 ft 9 in) to 4.3 m (14 ft 1 in)
- Curb weight: 11 tonnes (10.8 long tons; 12.1 short tons)

Chronology
- Predecessor: Alexander Dennis Enviro400 MMC

The Alexander Dennis Enviro400EV is a battery electric double-decker bus produced by the British bus manufacturer Alexander Dennis. The Enviro400EV is available both as a complete integral battery electric bus and as a battery electric bus body as well the integral Enviro400FCEV fuel cell bus. The first generation Enviro400EV, derived from the Alexander Dennis Enviro400 City, was built in partnership with Chinese electric vehicle manufacturer BYD Auto on the BYD K series chassis between 2018 and 2024.

== Description ==
In 2018, Alexander Dennis launched the Enviro400EV in partnership with BYD Auto, derived from the Enviro400 City and built on a BYD chassis. It is the second battery electric bus model from Alexander Dennis, following 2016's launch of the single deck Enviro200EV, also produced in partnership with BYD. Initially, the first 10.9 metre Enviro400EVs first entered service with Transport for London (TfL) operator Metroline on route 43 in 2019, followed by a shorter 10.3 metre variant launched in 2021.

Alexander Dennis added to the EV range by introducing the Enviro400FCEV fuel cell bus in 2021, with the first completed example of the type being shown at the 2022 Euro Bus Expo. The Enviro400FCEV can be equipped with either a 45 kW or 60 kW Ballard FCmove-HD hydrogen cell as well as a 30 kWh electric reserve battery from Impact Clean Power Technologies, and the Enviro400FCEV has a maximum power output of 350 kWh provided by the Voith Electrical Drive System, offering a maximum range of 300 miles (480 km).

A second-generation Enviro400EV, featuring a newly restyled exterior and driver's cab, a new Voith driveline with a 410 kW peak power output, as well as options for either 472kWh or 354kWh NMC batteries repositioned further towards the front of the bus, was announced by Alexander Dennis in November 2022, with the first complete bus unveiled in November 2023. An open top variant was also announced upon the launch of the second-generation Enviro400EV, while a variant built to TfL specification, offered with 14 year or 1 million kilometres (620,000 mi) warranty that allowed the buses to be used for two consecutive TfL bus contracts without requiring battery replacement, was revealed in August 2024.

== Operators ==
=== First generation (2018-2024) ===
==== BYD Alexander Dennis Enviro400EV ====
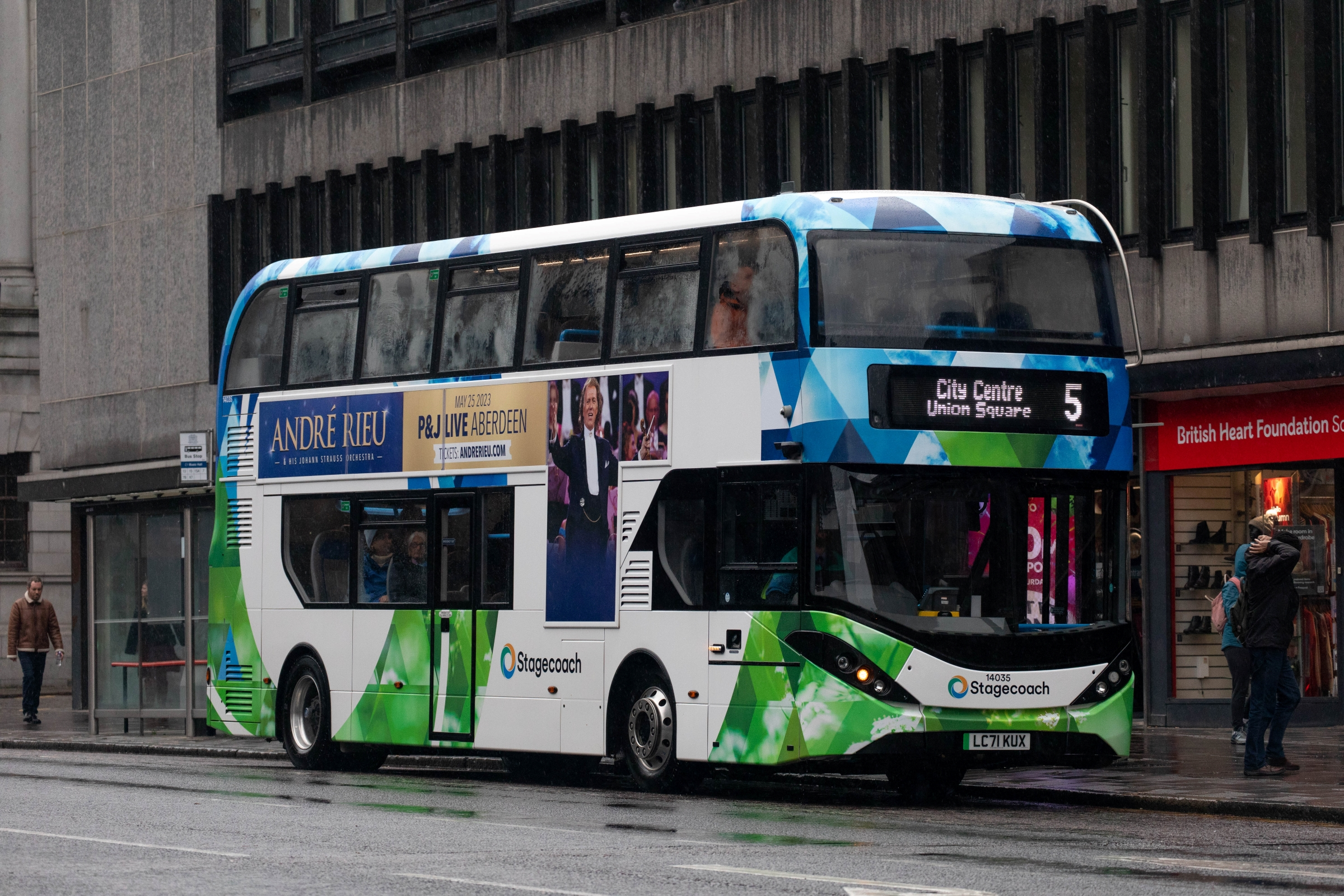
Stagecoach Bluebird first-generation BYD Alexander Dennis Enviro400EV in Aberdeen in September 2022

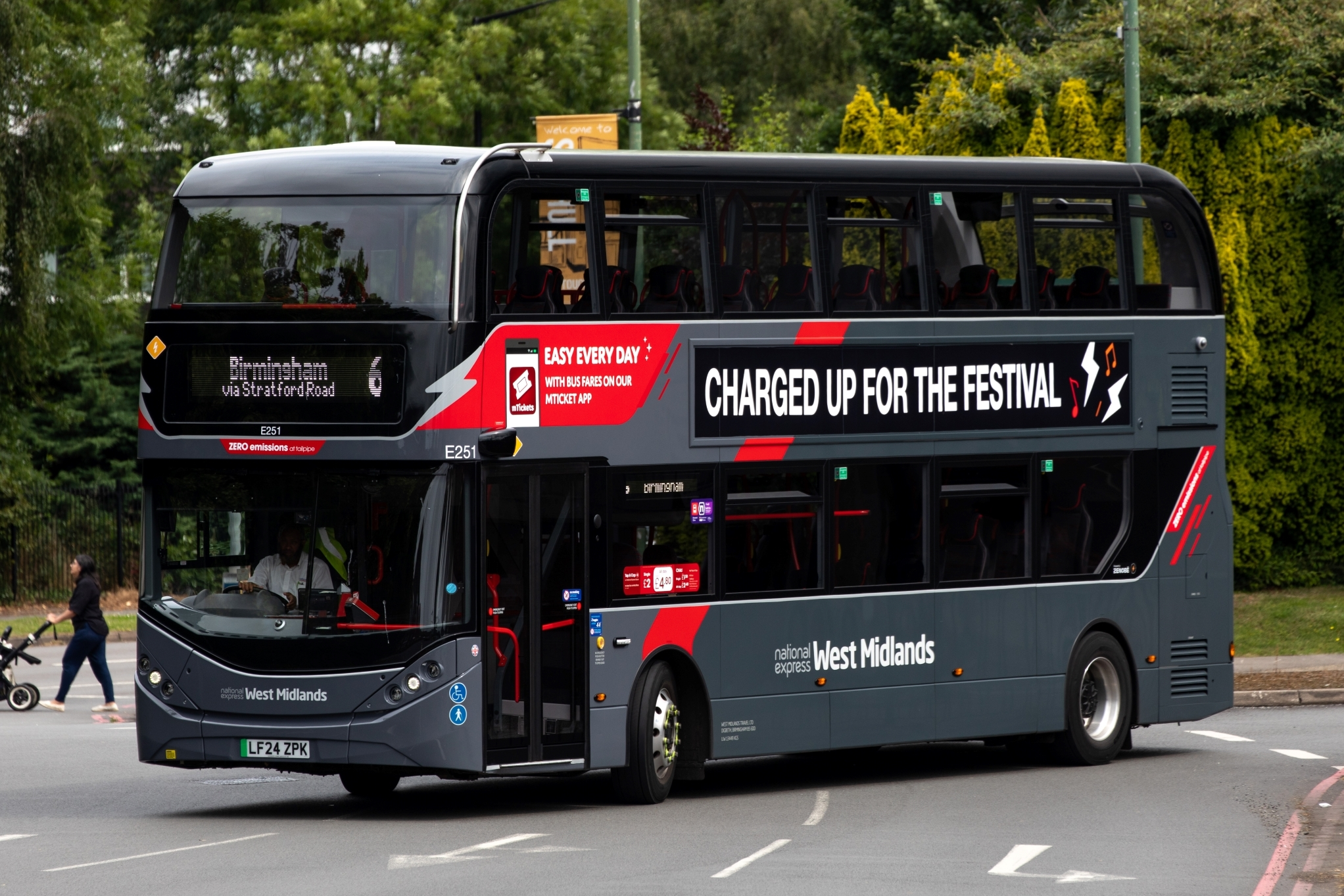
National Express West Midlands first-generation BYD Alexander Dennis Enviro400EV in Solihull in July 2024

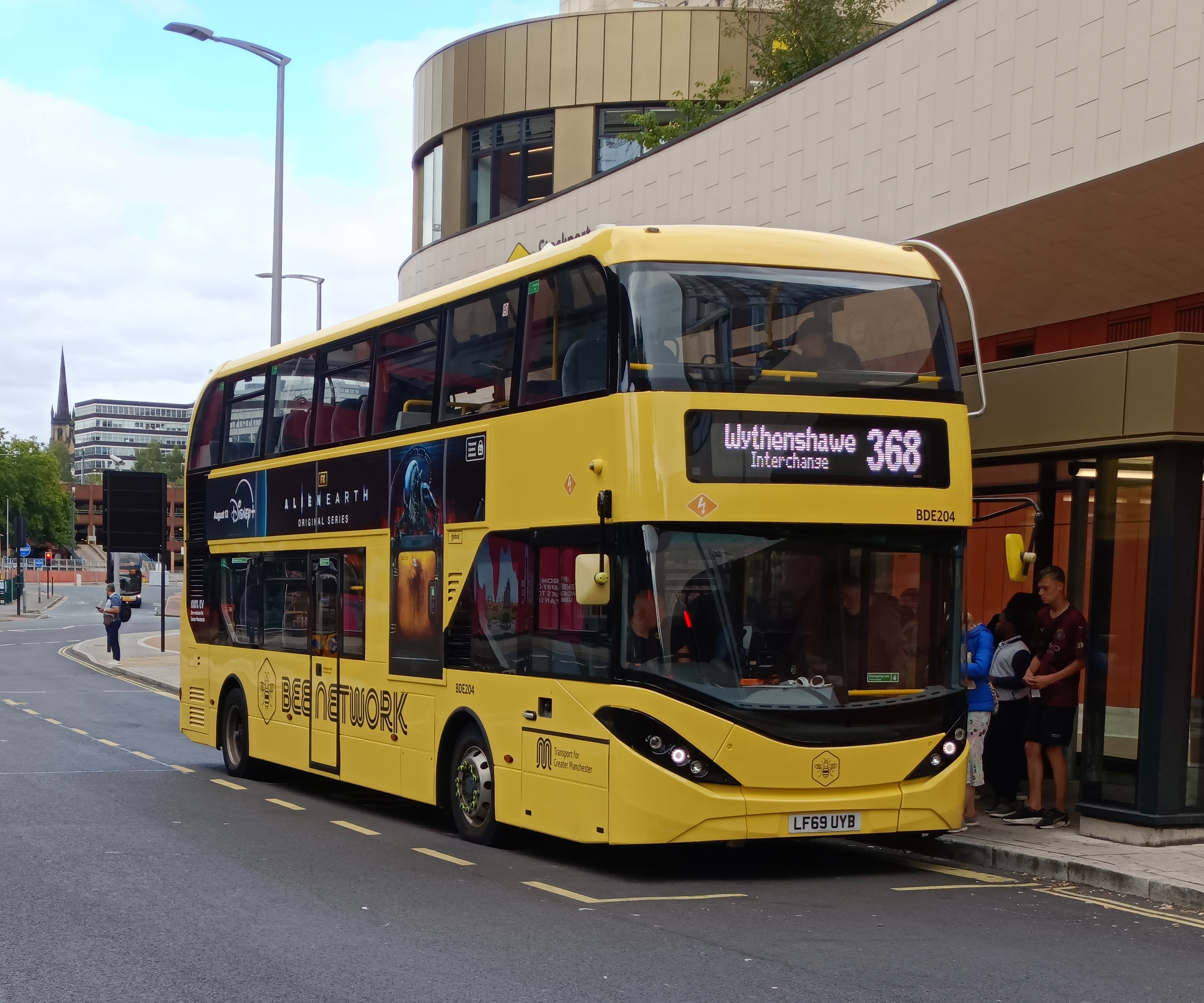
Metroline Manchester/Bee Network first-generation BYD Alexander Dennis Enviro400EV at Stockport Interchange in August 2025

Large numbers of first-generation Enviro400EVs on BYD chassis have entered service with London's bus operators for TfL bus services across the city. Customers include Go-Ahead London, who alone have ordered 169 of the type for delivery throughout 2023, Metroline, RATP Dev Transit London, Stagecoach London and Abellio London. Ten of Stagecoach London's Enviro400EVs were used to shuttle delegates and world leaders at the 2021 United Nations Climate Change Conference in Glasgow prior to entering London service, while a batch of Abellio Enviro400EVs operating on route 63 were delivered with enhanced interiors specified under TfL's Future Bus project. Go-Ahead London also took delivery of eighteen Enviro400EVs fitted with pantograph chargers for service on route 132 in 2021.

National Express West Midlands and National Express Coventry are also major operators of first-generation Enviro400EVs, with its first 19 entering service in Birmingham in July 2020 and an additional 10 arriving at Coventry later in the year. National Express Coventry began taking delivery of an order of 130 Enviro400EVs in late 2022 as part of a plan for Coventry to have the first all-electric bus fleet in a UK city, with the completion of the order in September 2023 converting the National Express Coventry fleet to 80% zero-emission vehicles. A further 170 Enviro400EVs were delivered to National Express West Midlands in late 2024, taking National Express' total fleet of first-generation Enviro400EVs in the West Midlands to 329. National Express Transport Solutions, the tour coaching arm of the National Express Group, also took delivery of four Enviro400EVs in May 2022 for tourist shuttle services to the Warner Bros. Studios, Leavesden.

Stagecoach Manchester took delivery of 32 Enviro400EVs in early 2020, which were allocated to the Sharston depot for service in South Manchester. In addition, Stagecoach in Cambridge received two in February 2020 on the Cambridge Citi 6 service. 22 Enviro400EVs were also delivered to Stagecoach Bluebird for service in Aberdeen in April 2022, which were joined by 13 more in 2023.

First Leeds ordered five Enviro400EVs for the Stourton Park & Ride, which entered service with the opening of the site in mid-2021, while First Glasgow also ordered 91 Enviro400EVs alongside 22 Enviro200EVs in 2021. Delivery of the first batches of these buses began following the COP26 conference. Four Enviro400EVs were delivered to Lothian Buses in March 2021 with branding advertising Scottish Power, who helped to fund Lothian's order for the buses, and 12 Enviro400EVs were delivered to Xplore Dundee, entering service in early 2022.

Transport for Greater Manchester ordered 100 Enviro400EVs in 2022 for use on its franchised 'Bee Network' bus services, which commenced operations in September 2023; the first 50 buses began to be delivered to Go North West for Bee Network services in Bolton in June 2023, and the remaining 50 entered service with Stagecoach Manchester in Oldham from March 2024.

==== Alexander Dennis Enviro400FCEV ====
Twenty Enviro400FCEVs were ordered by the Liverpool City Region Combined Authority for use on contract to both Stagecoach Merseyside and South Lancashire and Arriva Merseyside. The "publicly owned" hydrogen buses are branded for Liverpool's MetroBus network and operate on service 10A, Liverpool's busiest bus route which connects the city with St Helens via Knowsley. The first bus from this order was completed in November 2022, and the first buses started entering service with Arriva in May 2023. Issues with the supply of green hydrogen fuel meant that between 2023 and early 2024, most of Arriva's Enviro400FCEVs were non-operational, and despite some briefly re-entering service after both the finding of a stable supply of green hydrogen and a battery refit in mid-2024, it was announced in December 2025 that the buses were to be converted to battery electric power.

=== Second generation (2023-present) ===
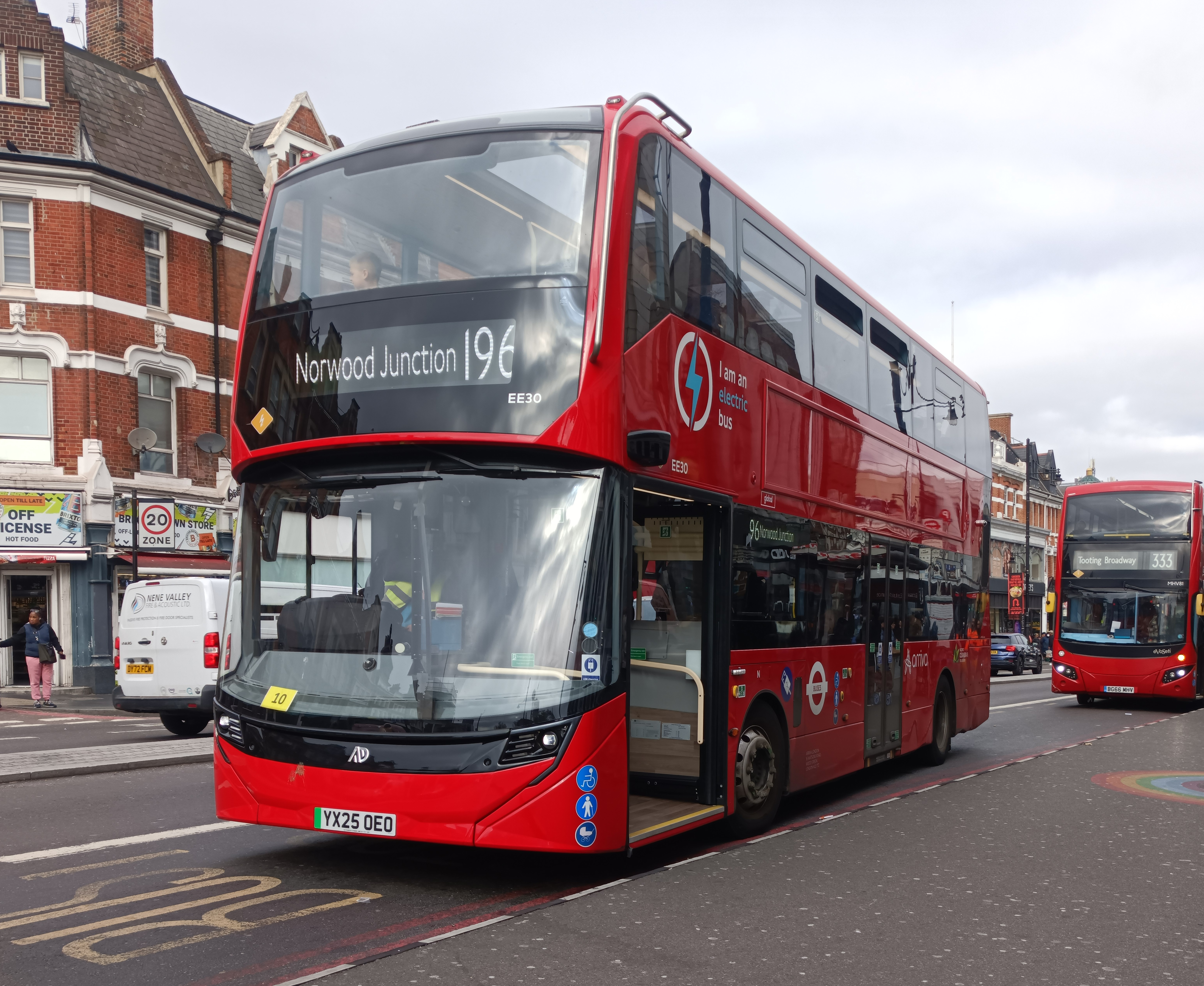
Arriva London second-generation Enviro400EV in Brixton in November 2025

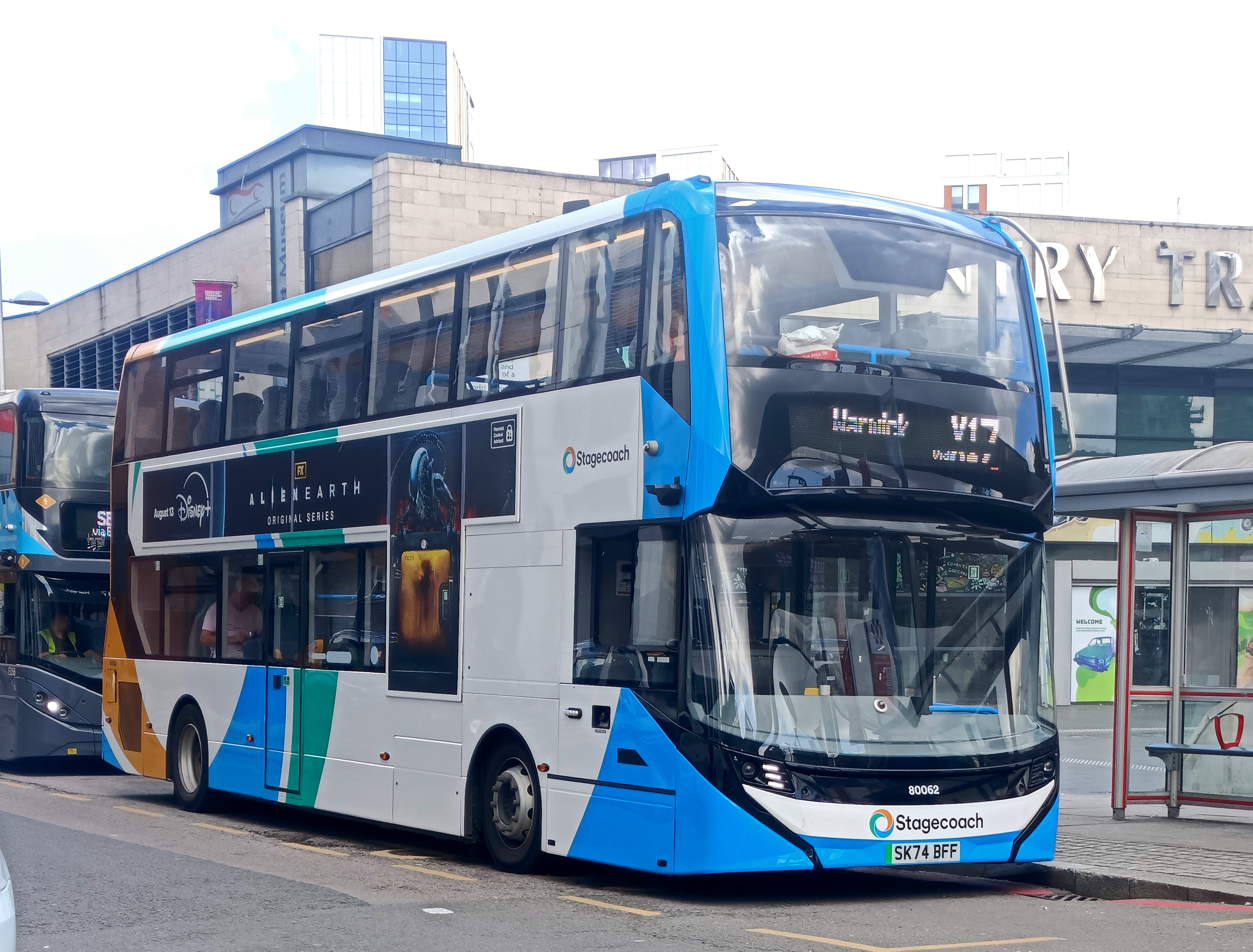
Stagecoach Midlands second-generation Enviro400EV in Coventry city centre in September 2025

The Stagecoach Group were the first operator to order and take delivery of the second-generation Enviro400EV, taking delivery of the first of 55 Enviro400EVs for Stagecoach West's Oxford depot in March 2024, branded as 'electro' buses for use in the Oxford SmartZone. A further 180 were ordered by the group for delivery between 2025 and 2026, intended for Stagecoach subsidiaries receiving central government funding from the Zero-Emission Regional Bus Areas (ZEBRA2) scheme, with 48 of these to be delivered to Stagecoach South West, the first being delivered to Torbay depot in October 2025, 32 delivered to Stagecoach in Hull, 31 delivered to Stagecoach Midlands, 26 delivered to Stagecoach West Scotland in Ardrossan, and 12 delivered to Stagecoach East Scotland in Arbroath.

The first 17 second-generation Enviro400EVs built to TfL specification were ordered by Stagecoach London in July 2024 for delivery in early 2025. Arriva London took delivery of 30 Enviro400EVs across two batches between March and May 2025, the first 12 of which are branded for use on London Superloop route SL6, with the remaining 18 due for conventional TfL service on route 196. Falcon Buses is to take delivery of 5 Enviro400EVs for the company's first TfL service, route 467, in September 2026.

In February 2025, it was announced that the Liverpool City Region's Metro bus network is to take delivery of 58 Enviro400EVs.

Transdev Blazefield's Harrogate subsidiary took delivery of 19 Enviro400EVs equipped with pantograph chargers for use on the 36 service between Harrogate, Ripon and Leeds between late 2024 and early 2025, while Reading Buses took delivery of 24 Enviro400EVs in February 2026 to replace biogas double-deckers on its Purple 17 and Claret 21 services, the latter serving the University of Reading, as part of a 53-vehicle order for Alexander Dennis buses placed by the operator; an additional order for eight more Enviro400EVs were introduced on the Yellow 26 in May 2026.

== See also ==
- Alexander Dennis Enviro100EV, the Enviro400EV's midibus counterpart
- Alexander Dennis Enviro200EV, the Enviro400EV's single-deck counterpart
- List of buses
