= Alexander Dennis Enviro200EV =

Battery electric single-deck bus

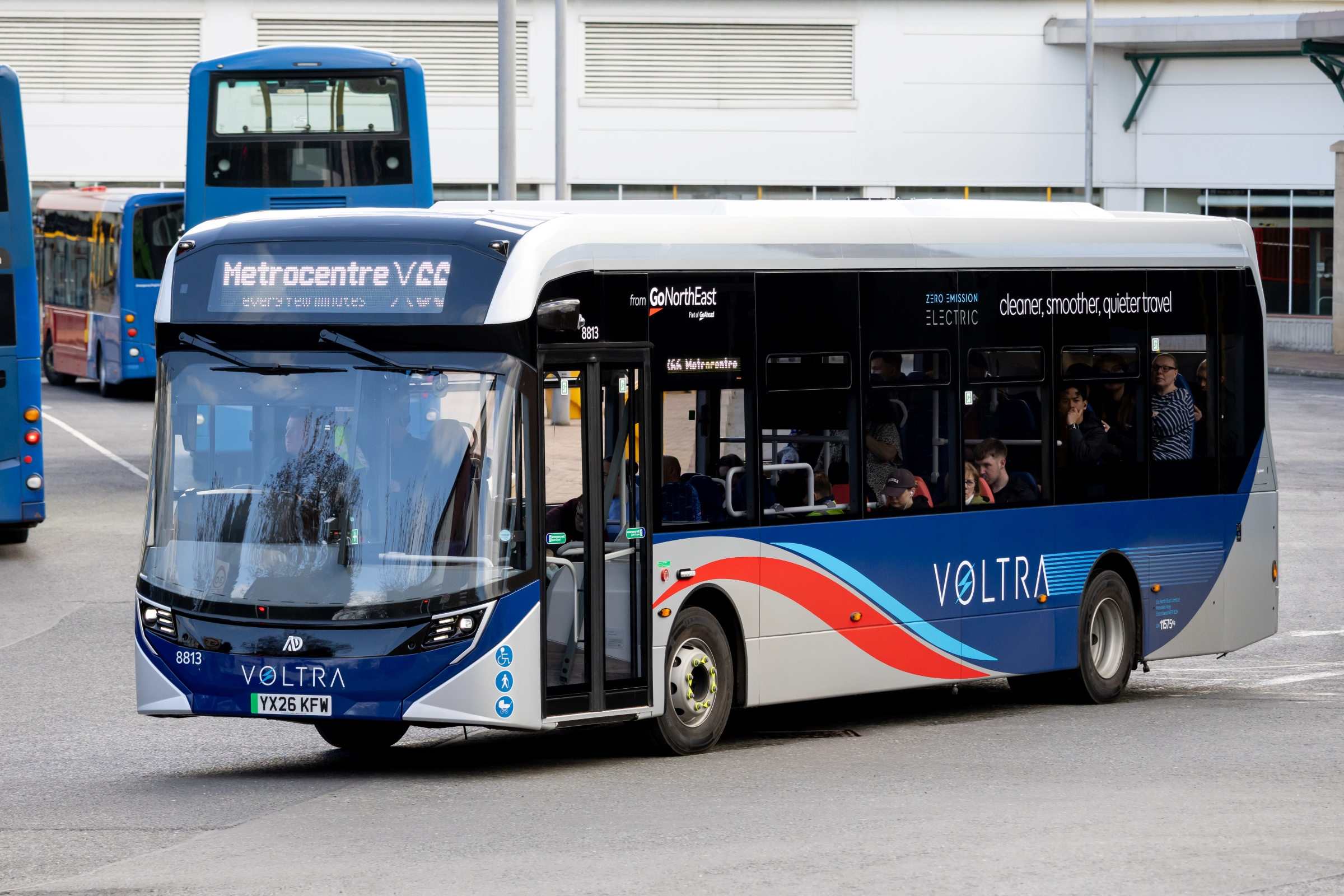
- Go North East second-generation Alexander Dennis Enviro200EV at Gateshead Interchange in April 2026

Overview
- Manufacturer: Alexander Dennis
- Production: 2015–2024 (first generation); 2025–present (second generation)

Body and chassis
- Doors: 1 or 2 doors
- Floor type: Low floor
- Chassis: BYD K9 (1st gen); Integral (2nd gen)
- Related: Alexander Dennis Enviro100EV; Alexander Dennis Enviro200 MMC; Alexander Dennis Enviro400EV

Powertrain
- Electric motor: 2 x BYD 90kW in-wheel (1st gen); Driventic Vehicle Electrical Drive System MD/HD (2nd gen)
- Capacity: Up to 80 passengers (up to 40 seated)
- Transmission: Direct Drive
- Battery: 320 Ah lithium iron phosphate (1st gen); 400 kWh CATL lithium iron phosphate (2nd gen)
- Range: 160 mi (260 km) (1st gen); 285 mi (459 km) (2nd gen)

Dimensions
- Length: 8.9–12.7 m (29 ft 2 in – 41 ft 8 in)
- Width: 2.47 m (8 ft 1 in)
- Height: 3.4 m (11 ft 2 in)
- Curb weight: 11,000–12,500 kg (24,300–27,600 lb) (1st gen)

The Alexander Dennis Enviro200EV is a battery electric single-deck bus produced by the British bus manufacturer Alexander Dennis since 2015. The first generation was produced in partnership with Chinese electric vehicle manufacturer BYD Auto.

== Design ==
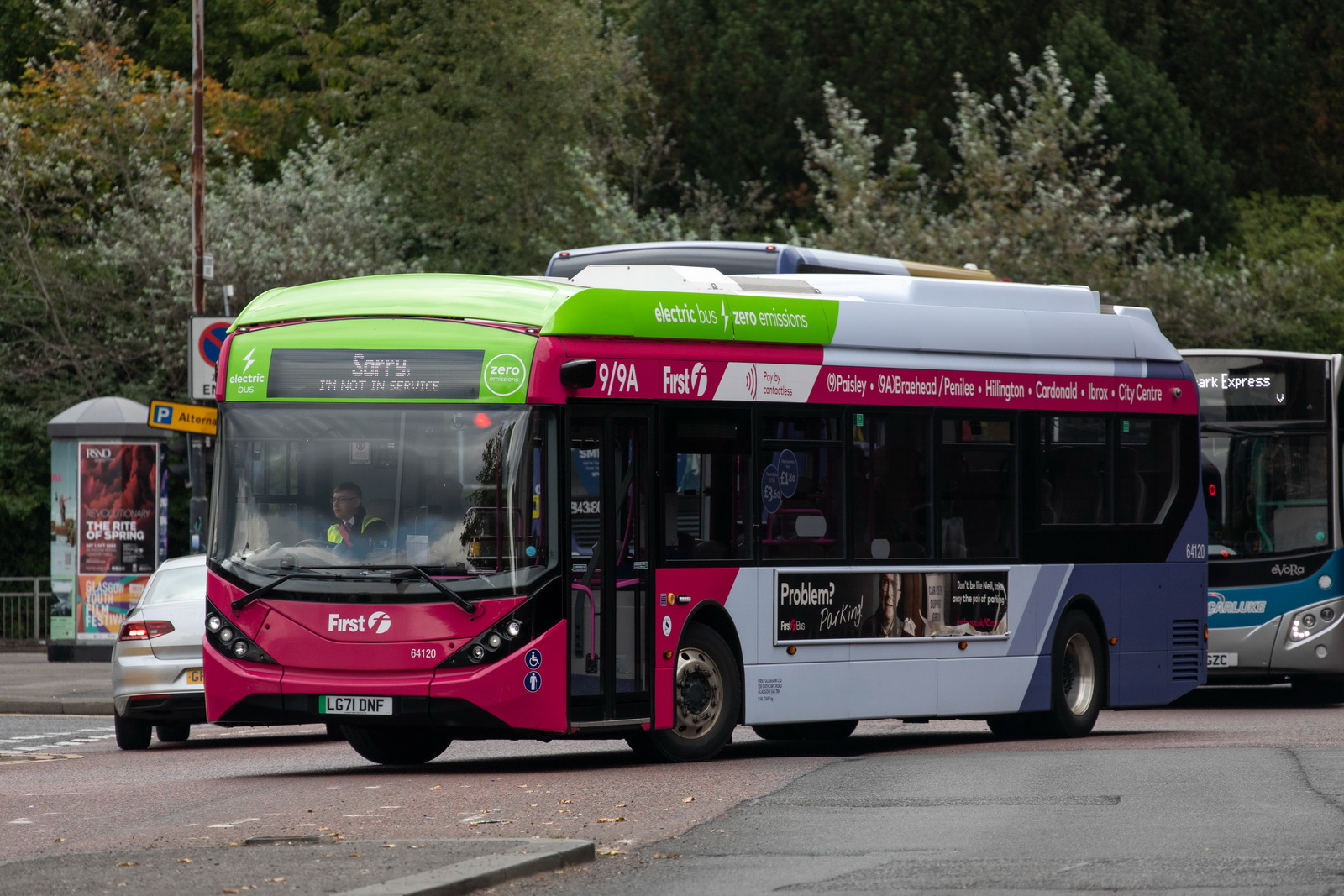
First Glasgow first-generation BYD Enviro200EV at Buchanan bus station in September 2022

An electric variant of the diesel integral Alexander Dennis Enviro200 MMC, which had been launched that same year to replace the outgoing Enviro200 and Enviro300, the first-generation Enviro200EV launched in 2015 utilises BYD's own 12 m (39 ft 4 in) chassis and drivetrain and has a range of up to 160 miles with a recharge time of 3.5 hours. A shorter 10.8 m (35 ft 5 in) variant was subsequently added to the range in 2016.

The lithium iron phosphate batteries of the first-generation Enviro200EV are stored on the roof of the bus. From the beginning of production, the battery store was arranged in a 'pod' layout, which was replaced in 2020 by a revised and more aerodynamic arrangement that removed the need for the 'pod'.

A second-generation Enviro200EV, using "in-house" battery-electric technology and featuring a restyled exterior, driver's cab and passenger compartment similar to the Enviro100EV, was revealed by Alexander Dennis in October 2024 ahead of the 2024 Euro Bus Expo, and was formally launched in January 2026. Produced at Alexander Dennis' Scarborough factory, the second-generation Enviro200EV will be available at lengths of 9.9 metres (32 ft), 10.9 metres (36 ft) and 11.7 metres (38 ft) for regional operators, providing a maximum capacity of 92 passengers with up to 43 seated, with Transport for London (TfL) specification Enviro200EVs additionally being offered in 10.4 metres (34 ft) length. Unlike the Enviro100EV and second-generation Enviro400EV, which use NMC batteries, the second-generation Enviro200EV retains of lithium iron phosphate batteries manufactured by CATL.

== Operators ==
=== First generation (2015-2025) ===
==== United Kingdom ====
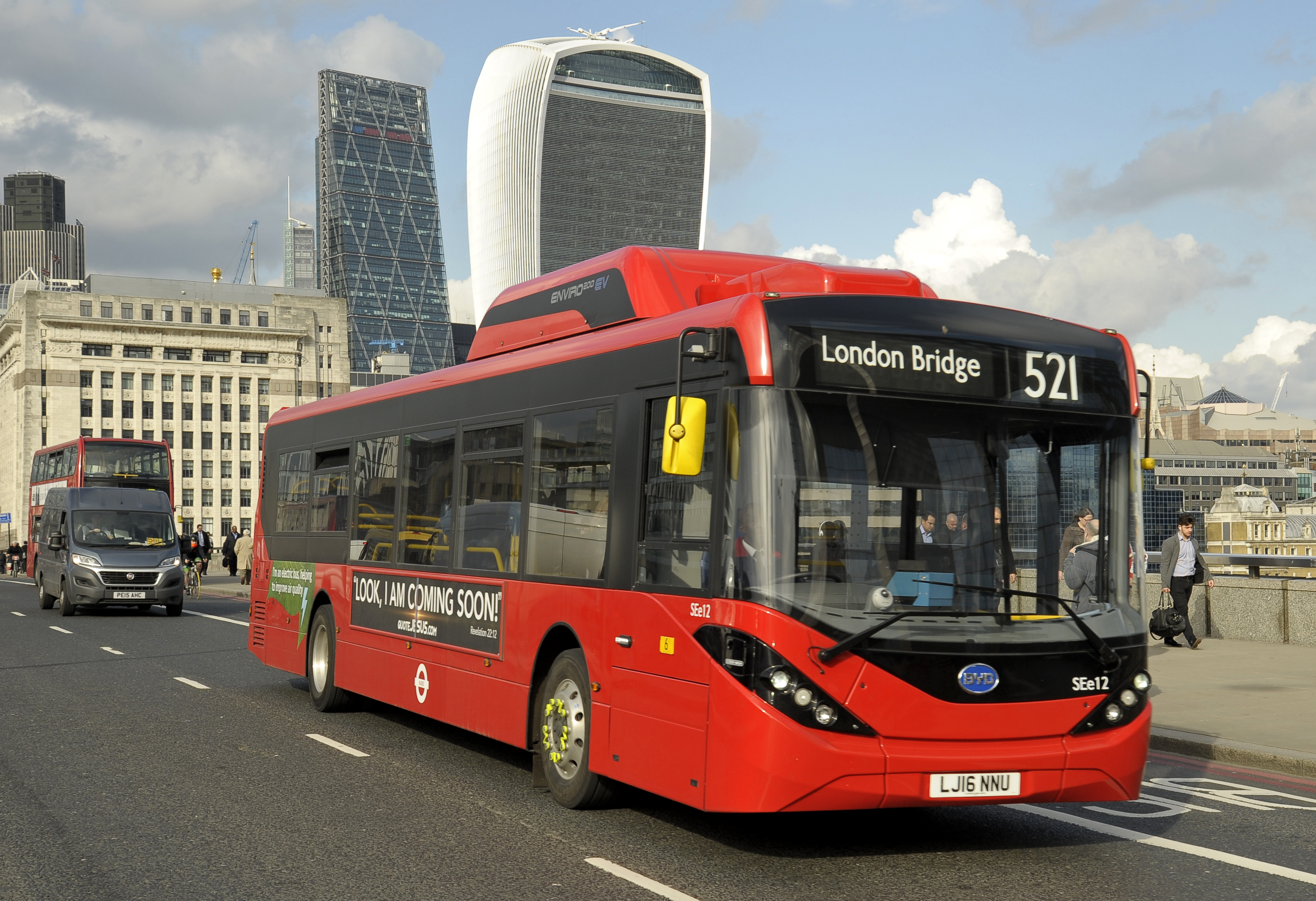
A Go-Ahead London first-generation Enviro200EV featuring the early roof 'pod' crossing London Bridge in 2017

Go-Ahead London were the launch customer for the Enviro200EV, ordering 51 of the type in July 2015 after trialling two integral BYD K9 electric buses for use on routes 507 and 521. Further deliveries included 14 examples for route 360, 30 more in 2018 for use on routes 153 and 214, and 130 of the type being supplied for various routes across London throughout 2023.

Other TfL contractors who operate first-generation Enviro200EVs include London United, who operate 100 of the type which were delivered across two batches in 2018 and 2021, Metroline, who purchased 23 Enviro200EVs for use on route 46, and Stagecoach London, who purchased five of the first Enviro200EVs to feature the redesigned roof layout for service on route 323.

Outside London, the first 12 Enviro200EVs to enter service outside of the capital were delivered to Arriva Merseyside in 2017. Three Enviro200EVs were also delivered to Salisbury Reds in 2020 for park and ride services in Salisbury. Since then, the Stagecoach Group has become a popular operator of Enviro200EVs, most commonly in Scotland; the group's first nine Enviro200EVs were delivered to Stagecoach South for use in Guildford on 'Glide' park and ride services in January 2019. Further orders for the group's Scottish operations, funded in part by the Scottish Zero Emission Bus (ScotZEB) challenge fund, began to be delivered in the early 2020s; Stagecoach East Scotland first took delivery of nine Enviro200EVs for service in Perth, followed by further 13 to electrify the city's bus network in early 2023 and eleven Enviro200EVs for service Dunfermline in 2023. Stagecoach West Scotland, meanwhile, took delivery of 15 Enviro200EVs for service in Kilmarnock in 2021, joined by a further two in early 2023.

First Glasgow first took delivery of two Enviro200EVs for trial service in January 2020, which was followed by an order for 22 more of the type in March 2021; prior to entering public service in November, these were used as shuttle buses for the 2021 United Nations Climate Change Conference being held in the city. This was followed by a repeat order for 50 more Enviro200EVs, which began to be delivered to the company's Scotstoun depot in June 2023. Elsewhere in Glasgow, three dual-door Enviro200EVs were delivered by National Car Parks in 2019 for car park shuttle services at Glasgow Airport.

A handful of Enviro200EVs are also in use by operators on private or local authority contract bus services. Ten delivered between 2022 and 2024 are operated by Cobra Corporate Services on private shuttle services for Sky UK campuses in Osterley and Livingston, while four Enviro200EVs, two being 10.8 metres (35 ft) examples and another two being 10.2 metres (33 ft) examples, were delivered to Stagecoach in Mansfield for use on Nottinghamshire County Council contracted 'Nottsbus' services between 2018 and 2021, and the South Yorkshire Mayoral Combined Authority took delivery of four Enviro200EVs in March 2024, entering service on 'Sheffield Connect' shuttle services on 8 April.

==== Exports ====
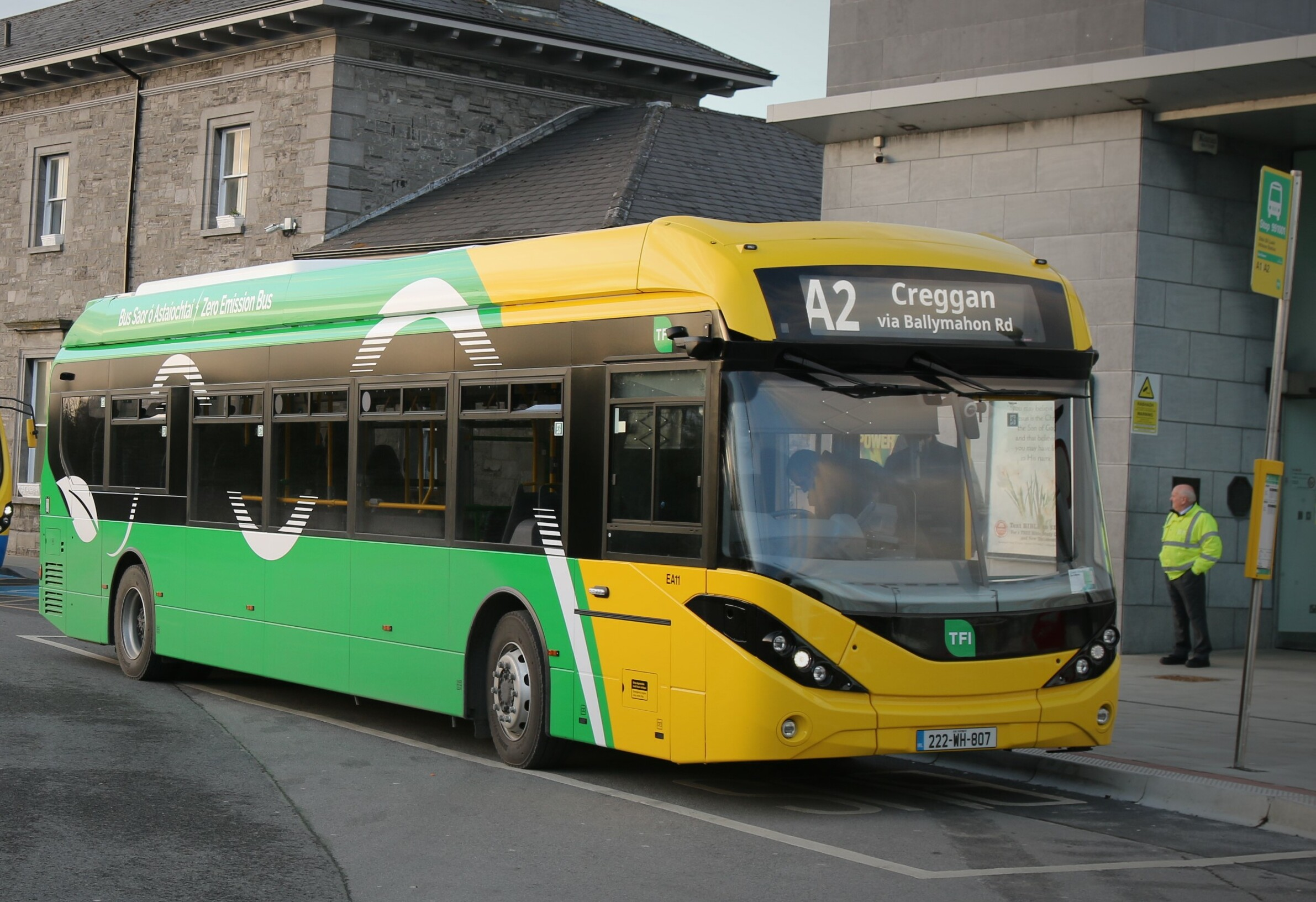
Bus Éireann TfI-specification first-generation Enviro200EV at Athlone railway station in January 2023

The National Transport Authority of Ireland have ordered 45 Enviro200EVs to be delivered to operators across Ireland over a period of five years, specified at 12 metres (39 ft) length with dual doors and spaces for wheelchairs and prams as well as a raked front windscreen. Deliveries commenced in January 2023, with the first 11 Enviro200EVs entering service with Bus Éireann in Athlone.

In New Zealand, nine Enviro200EVs were delivered to Auckland Transport operator Fullers360 in late 2020 for services connecting the Auckland Region's Waiheke Island. An electric demonstrator based on the tri-axle Enviro200 XLB was later delivered in August 2021 to Auckland Transport.

Since the delivery of the XLB demonstrator, which now lives permanently with Pavlovich Coachlines (now brought by Ritchies Transport in 2025) in Westgate, Northwest Auckland, operators such as Ritchies Transport and Howick and Eastern by Transdev have ordered and had their Enviro200XLB EVs locally assembled. Currently there are two BYD K9 Enviro200EVs in service, nine BYD D8UR Enviro200EVs in service and fifteen BYD D9UR Enviro200XLB EVs in service.

Elsewhere in New Zealand, three BYD K9 Enviro200EVs operate in Tauranga for BayHopper services, and another three BYD D9UR Enviro200EVs operate in Christchurch for Environment Canterbury Regional Council's Metro Christchurch services.

=== Second generation (2024–present) ===
Go North East was the first operator to take delivery of second-generation Enviro200EVs, with four built to the company's 'Voltra' specification entering service from April 2026 on service X66 between Gateshead and the MetroCentre shopping centre.

The Stagecoach Group placed the Enviro200EV's first major pre-production order in June 2024, with 54 due for delivery in 2026 intended for Stagecoach subsidiaries receiving central government funding from the Zero-Emission Regional Bus Areas (ZEBRA2) scheme, while First Bus also ordered twelve Enviro200EVs for delivery to First West of England in Bath during 2026. A fleet of 11.7 metres (38 ft) demonstrator 'seed vehicles' built to national group operators' specifications will also be manufactured by Alexander Dennis.

Falcon Buses of Byfleet became the first independent bus operator to take delivery of the second-generation Enviro200EV, with 13 delivered in July 2026 for use on routes 436 and 461. Go Ahead London ordered 43 for use on route 126.

== See also ==
- Alexander Dennis Enviro400EV, the Enviro200EV's double-deck counterpart
- Alexander Dennis Enviro100EV, the Enviro200EV's midibus counterpart
- List of buses
