= Ferrytoll Park and Ride =

Bus park and ride scheme

Coordinates: 56.0226°N 3.4063°W

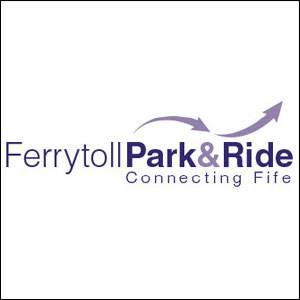

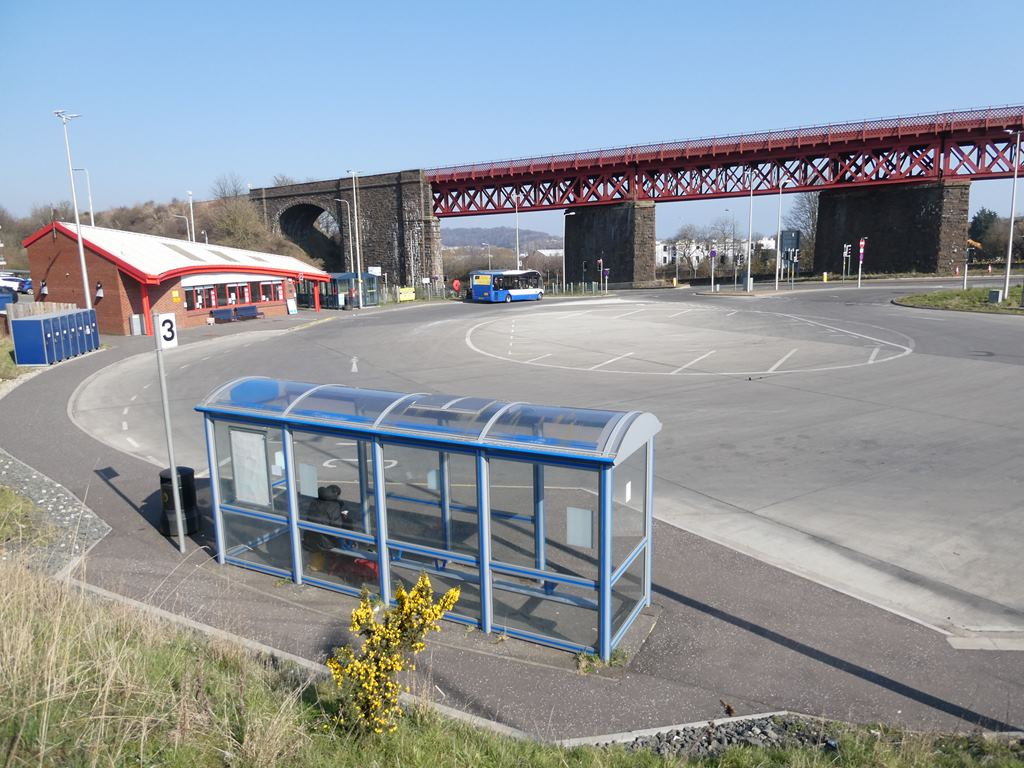
- Ferrytoll Park and Ride
- Parent: City of Edinburgh Council and Fife Council
- Founded: 2000
- Service area: Edinburgh and Fife
- Service type: Park and Ride
- Website: https://www.fife.gov.uk/facilities/bus-station/ferrytoll-bus-park-and-ride

Ferrytoll Park and Ride is a bus park and ride scheme for Edinburgh and Fife located in Inverkeithing in Fife, Scotland. The park and ride is situated near the Forth Road Bridge, is adjacent to the M90 at Ferrytoll interchange, and has over 1000 parking spaces.

== Construction ==
Construction began on Ferrytoll Park and Ride in November 1999, as part of a joint initiative between Fife Council and Stagecoach Group. The site opened in November 2000, and cost £4.2m.

The location of the site was chosen to be in the south of Inverkeithing, allowing immediate access to the Forth Road Bridge via the A9000 at Ferrytoll Interchange.

== Facilities ==
=== Parking ===
Ferrytoll has the following services on site: 1042 car parking spaces, spread over a surface and multi-storey car park. The surface car park has 37 disabled parking spaces, and the maximum headroom in multi-storey car park is 2.2 m.

Parking is free for a maximum of seven nights (2025).

The site has 11 car pick-up/drop-off bays, and four electric car charging points.

The site also accommodates cyclists, with 17 cycle lockers.

=== Waiting area ===
The site is well sheltered, with a covered walkway from the multi-storey car park to the waiting room and shelter with seating next to the bus stops.

The waiting room adjacent to bus stop is heated and features toilets, vending machines, seating, travel information and a staffed supervisor’s office.

== Services ==
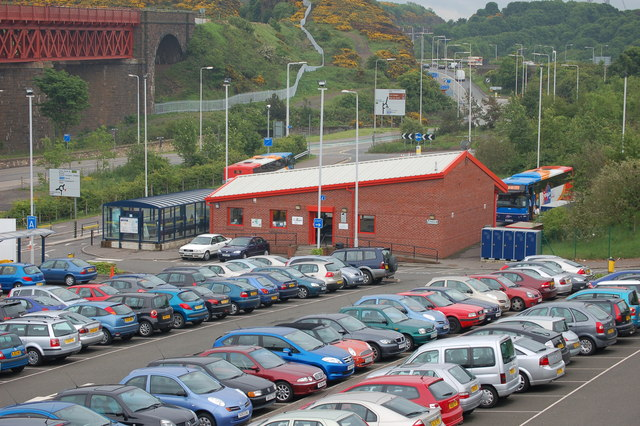
Ferrytoll Park and Ride waiting area and surface car park.

As of 2025, there are 20 bus routes operating from Ferrytoll Park and Ride.

Stance 1 is for services North to Fife and beyond, covering places such as Dunfermline, St Andrews and Kirkcaldy (2025).

Stance 2 is services to Edinburgh Airport, currently the 747 and 787 (2025).

Stance 3 is for services to Edinburgh (2025).

Stance 4 served the now discontinued first ever autonomous bus route AB1. No services currently use this stance.

== Awards ==
- The Queensbury Shelters Infrastructure Award, at the 2001 Bus Industry Awards.
- National transport awards commendation (2001).
- Dynamic Place Awards Top 10 (2002)
- European transport awards Certificate of Recognition
- AA car park security top rating.
