= Stagecoach South Scotland =

Bus operator in South Scotland

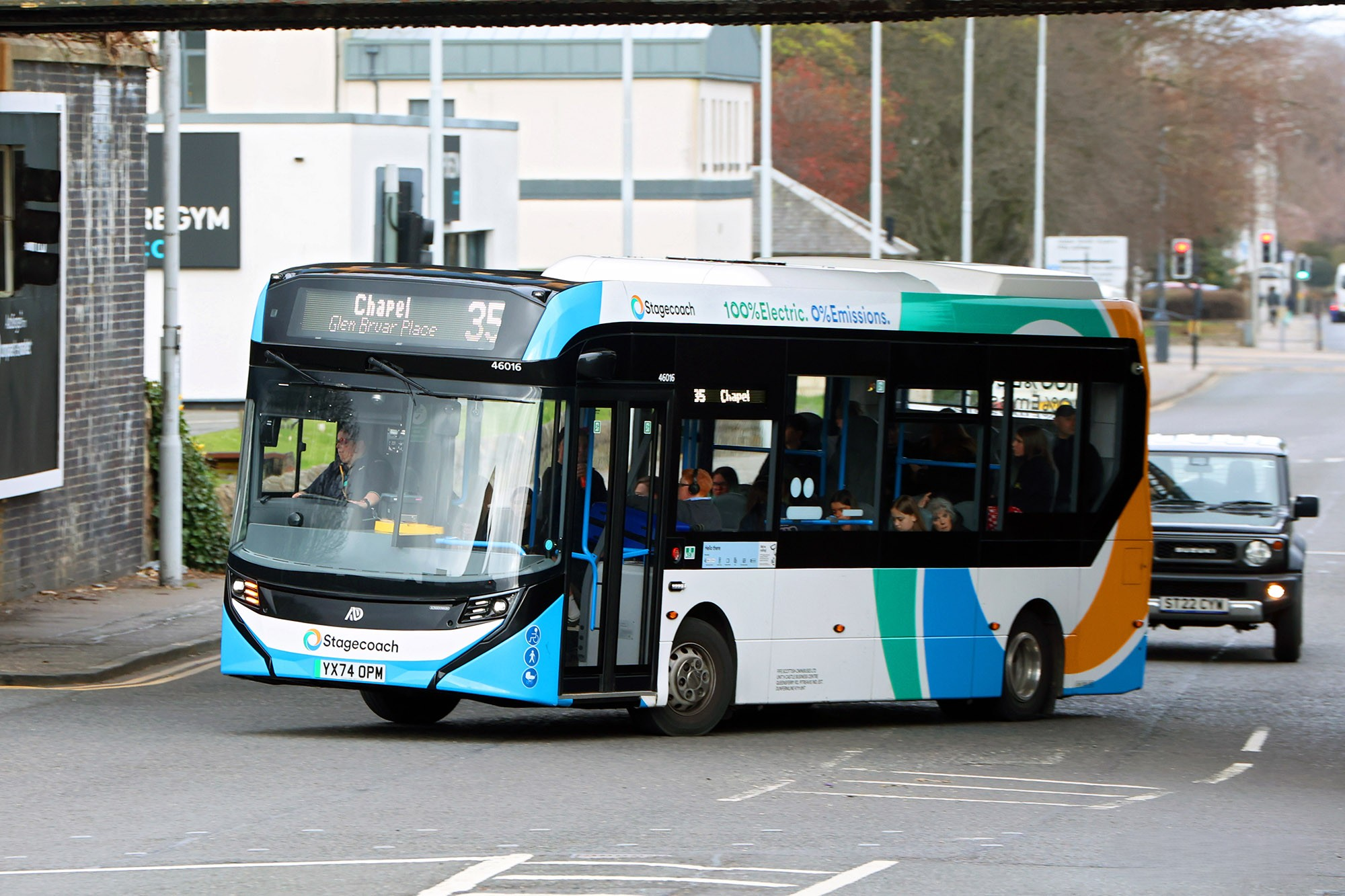
- Alexander Dennis Enviro100EV in Fife in April 2025
- Parent: Stagecoach Group
- Founded: November 2025; 1 year ago
- Headquarters: Dunfermline, Scotland, UK
- Service area: Fife; Tayside; Perthshire; Angus; Aberdeen; Edinburgh; Glasgow; Stirling
- Service type: Bus and coach
- Depots: 13
- Fleet: 700+ (November 2025)
- Annual ridership: 28.7 million
- Managing Director: Fiona Doherty
- Website: stagecoachbus.com

Stagecoach South Scotland is a bus operator providing services in southern Scotland, with its regional base in Dunfermline, Fife. The company is a subsidiary of the Stagecoach Group. The company previously operated under two identities, Stagecoach East Scotland and Stagecoach West Scotland, before merging in November 2025 to form the current operation.

== History ==
=== Individual companies ===
Stagecoach began long-distance express coach services in 1981 from its base in Perth, expanding into local bus operations when it bought McLennan of Spittalfield in 1985. Deregulation of bus services under the Transport Act 1985 in October 1986 gave Stagecoach the opportunity to expand operations in Perth, thus fierce competition with the dominant operator Strathtay Scottish began, which eventually saw Stagecoach's then-Perth Panther subsidiary emerge as the largest provider of bus services in the Perth area.

Stagecoach also operated in Glasgow as Magicbus (Scotland) Ltd between October 1986 and April 1992, operating a fleet of AEC Routemasters acquired from London Regional Transport from a depot in Port Dundas. In April 1992, this operation was sold to Kelvin Central Buses, with Stagecoach divesting the operation to position itself for a bid to buy former Glasgow passenger transport executive Strathclyde Buses.

On the breakup and privatisation of the state-owned Scottish Bus Group, Stagecoach was successful in acquiring two of the subsidiaries, namely Northern Scottish in March 1991 and Fife Scottish in July 1991, the latter forming the basis of the East Scotland operation following a protracted legal battle between Stagecoach and a management buyout team, with employee-owned ex-SBG subsidiary Western Scottish later being purchased for £6 million in July 1994 to enable Stagecoach's entry into west Scotland.

Stagecoach expanded further west in Scotland with the purchases of independent Arran Transport in August 1994. A1 Service of Ardrossan in January 1995, Clyde Coast Coaches of Ardrossan during 1995; and AA Buses, the bus operations of Dodd's of Troon, in May 1997. By the end of 1997, the bus operations of Shuttle Buses of Kilwinning had also been absorbed.

In August 2003, the United Kingdom's first entirely commercial demand responsive bus service was launched by Stagecoach East Scotland in Fife. Trading as Yellow Taxibus and using the AA Buses Ltd legal name (transferred from then Stagecoach West Scotland, where it was purchased with the AA Buses operation in Ayrshire), the operation combined the benefits of a fixed bus route with the flexibility of pre-booked taxi pick-ups. Yellow Taxibus operated a fleet of eight-seater Mercedes-Benz Vito vehicles on a high-frequency service between Dunfermline and Edinburgh seven days a week; however, after a two-year trial, the loss-making service was withdrawn in November 2005.

In July 2004, Stagecoach announced the acquisition of the M8 Motorvator Glasgow to Edinburgh express service from Lanarkshire firm, Longs Coaches. This pitched Stagecoach in fierce and direct competition from Scottish Citylink, a company Stagecoach ironically operated vehicles for under a franchise agreement. Stagecoach continued to use the distinctive M8 Motorvator brand on this route, with vehicles wearing a red and off-white livery, and it was operated by Stagecoach Glasgow Ltd.

On 14 December 2005, Stagecoach purchased the Barnsley-based Traction Group, the largest remaining private bus company in the United Kingdom, for £26 million. The Traction Group owned Strathtay Scottish, which Stagecoach had pushed out of Perth some 16 years earlier. The Strathtay operations bridged the gap between Stagecoach's Fife, Perth, and Bluebird operations, giving the group a vast swathe of the country extending from Edinburgh through to Perth, northwards to Aberdeen and round to Inverness, with only Travel Dundee and First Aberdeen being the major non-Stagecoach operators within that area.

In March 2008, it was announced that Stagecoach had purchased Rennies of Dunfermline for an undisclosed sum, following the retirement of Rennies' owner. The Rennies fleet consisted of 60 vehicles, including 18 double-deckers, which were all leased from Stagecoach in Fife. Rennies were formerly based at Dunfermline (Wellwood Mill) before moving to Cowdenbeath in 2016.

In spring 2014, Stagecoach entered the South Queensferry area, replacing a withdrawn service to Edinburgh which had been run for many years by First Scotland East. However, the South Queensferry operation incurred huge losses and was withdrawn in June 2017, with Lothian Buses subsequently taking it over.

In May 2023, Stagecoach began operating autonomous Alexander Dennis Enviro200AV as part of the CAVForth scheme on route "AB1" across the Forth Road Bridge. Following lower-than-expected passenger numbers, however, the AB1 route ceased operations on 14 February 2025, with Stagecoach noting that the demonstration service "has significantly advanced the understanding of the operational and regulatory requirements for autonomous services". CAVForth plan to continue their research into autonomous public service vehicles.

=== Restructuring ===
In June 2025, it was reported that Stagecoach West Scotland were considering the future of their operations in Dumfries and Galloway, citing a 'disproportionate liability clause' included in upcoming tender agreements being offered by Dumfries and Galloway Council; leading the company to withdraw their bids for all tendered services across the region. The withdrawal was later confirmed that month, with Stagecoach confirming their total withdrawal from the region, including the termination of all commercial services operated by the company, with the exclusion of the X74 Dumfries to Glasgow express route, which was to instead be operated from Cumbernauld depot, and the 79 Carlisle to Dumfries route, operated by Stagecoach Cumbria & North Lancashire's Carlisle depot. As a result, Dumfries and Stranraer depots were to close, along with the outstations of Whithorn and Sanquhar, in early August 2025, with a combined loss of 130 jobs in the region.

Stagecoach also announced in June 2025 that it proposed to close its Cowdenbeath depot the following July, resulting in the closure of the Rennies operation after nearly 20 years of Stagecoach ownership and risking the loss of 60 jobs at the depot. Bookings for Rennies' coaching operation stopped being taken following the announcement; however, school services operated from Cowdenbeath are to operate as normal despite the proposed closure.

In November 2025, Stagecoach brought together the remaining East Scotland and West Scotland operations into one new company, Stagecoach South Scotland. The new company, now spanning the Central Belt and beyond, was formed with a fleet of around 700 vehicles, 170 of which were battery electric buses and 140 of which were coaches, complementing Stagecoach's North Scotland operations.

After the withdrawal of Cumbernauld-operated Megabus-branded Scottish Citylink services M11 and M20, Stagecoach South Scotland announced the closure of its depot in Cumbernauld in January 2026, citing rising costs, rising journey times due to slower traffic speeds, and a lack of progress in bus priority measures which left the depot no longer financially viable. When the depot closed on 5 April 2026, express services X25 and X25A, running between Abronhill and Glasgow, was also withdrawn due to operating at 'a sustained loss', however it was replaced by identical services provided by First Glasgow on the same day.

== Services ==
=== Express and Experience City Connect ===
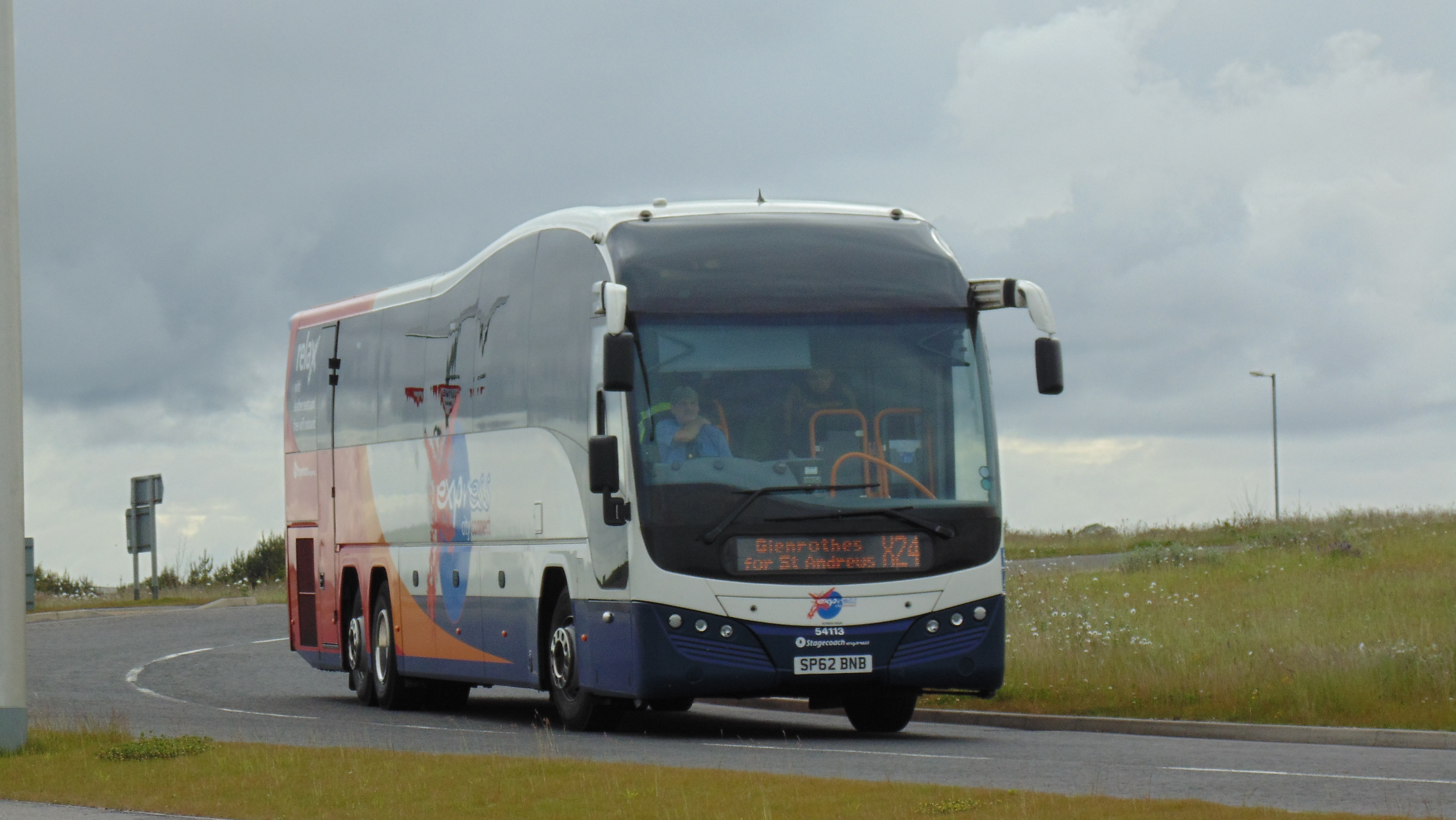
Stagecoach Express City Connect-liveried Volvo B13RT Plaxton Elite approaching Halbeath Park and Ride in June 2015

In October 2007, Stagecoach's Fife operations received a £4.5 million investment in upgrading the regional express network, with services branded as "Express City Connect" and "Experience City Connect". Express services from West Fife to Edinburgh received nine new Scania OmniLink tri-axle single-deckers featuring leather seating and free Wi-Fi, while the rest of the network received 20 Plaxton Profile bodied Volvo B7R coaches, also equipped with leather seating and free Wi-Fi.

In 2011, further new Plaxton Elite coaches were delivered to Stagecoach to help deal with the increase in passengers on the X59 service, with further examples being delivered between 2012 and 2017. This has resulted in the City Connect brand receiving the accolade of Top Express Operation at the UK Coach Awards in 2015, 2016 and 2017 respectively.

In 2023, Stagecoach ordered several brand-new Volvo 9700DD coaches for operation on services connecting Fife with Glasgow. Most have entered service with the operator in late 2024 and 2025.

=== Gold ===
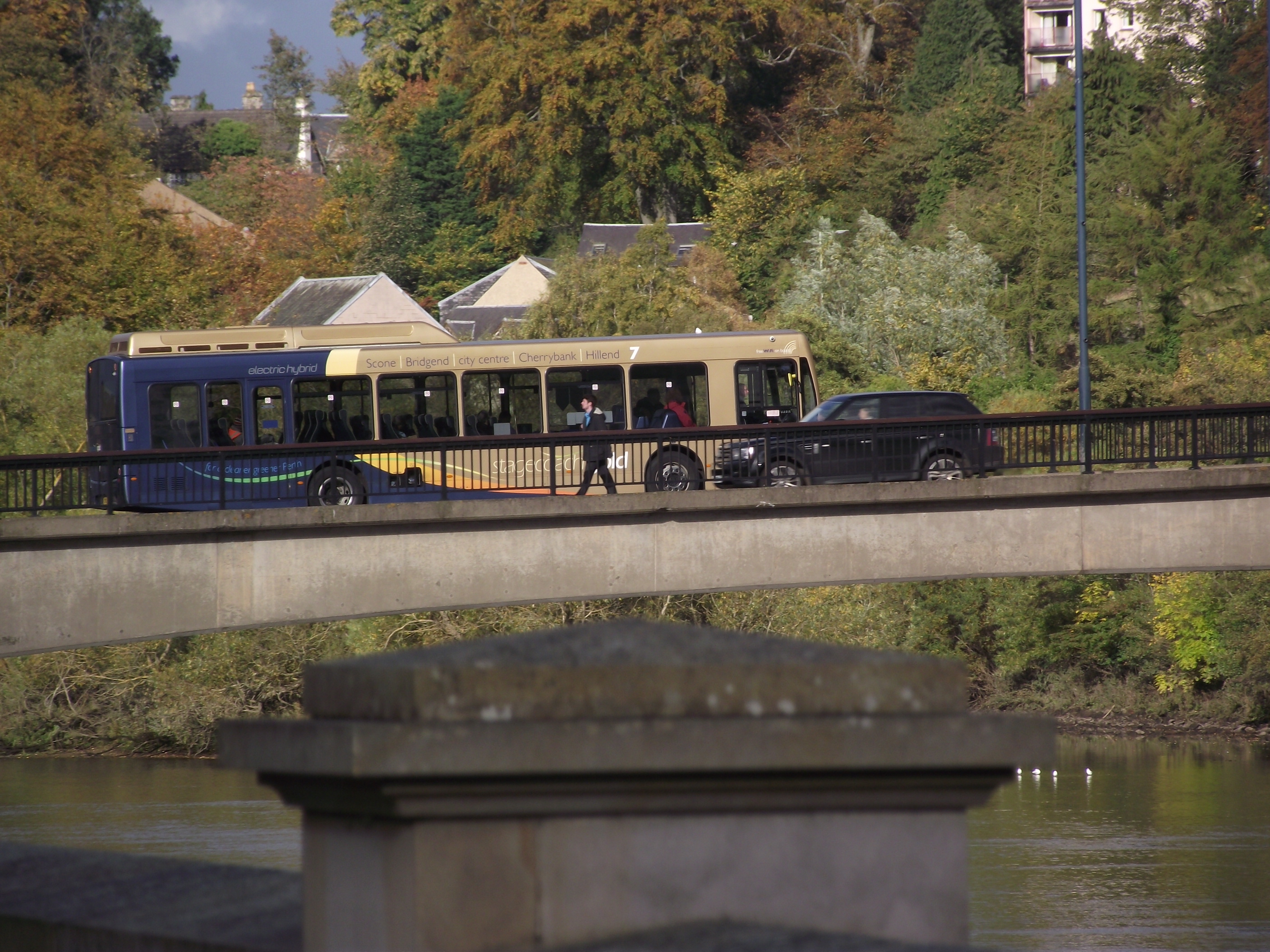
Stagecoach Gold Alexander Dennis Enviro350H crossing the Queen's Bridge in Perth in October 2014

In October 2007, Stagecoach in Perth commenced operations of the first of two Stagecoach Goldline services, operated as a trial for the wider Stagecoach Group in conjunction with a service run by Stagecoach Warwickshire. Stagecoach in Perth's Goldline service 7 was operated using eight new Alexander Dennis Enviro300 single-deck buses, fitted out to a higher interior standard and painted in a special gold and blue livery. Since these trials, the brand, renamed to Stagecoach Gold, has expanded to Stagecoach subsidiaries across the United Kingdom, with Perth's Gold service 7 later upgraded in 2012 to operate Alexander Dennis Enviro350H hybrid electric buses. However, the service has since been stripped of Gold status.

=== Park & Ride sites ===
Since 1999, Stagecoach South Scotland has operated and provided numerous park & ride sites across their operating area.

- Ferrytoll Park & Ride located in Fife, north of the Forth Road Bridge (in partnership with Fife Council), opened in November 1999.
- Halbeath Park & Ride, located on the outskirts of Dunfermline in Fife (in partnership with Fife Council), opened in November 2012. Halbeath is also served by Scottish Citylink, FlixBus, Megabus and other long-distance transport operators
- Broxden Park & Ride located on the western edge of Perth, which also connects with Scottish Citylink and Megabus services (in partnership with Perth & Kinross Council).
- Kinross Park & Ride is located to the East of Junction 6 on the M90 motorway.

== Fleet and depots ==
=== ScotZEB ===
As part of phase 2 of ScotZEB, in 2024, Stagecoach received funding to purchase 78 battery-electric buses, consisting of 44 double-deckers, 28 single-deckers, and six coaches, for a total of 78 vehicles. All six coaches were Yutong TCe12s.

As part of phase 3 of ScotZEB, in 2026 Stagecoach was awarded £4,568,280 to purchase 43 electric buses and 25 EV chargers. The buses purchased were 16 double-deckers, 21 single-deckers, and seven coaches, all made by Yutong.

=== Eastern region ===
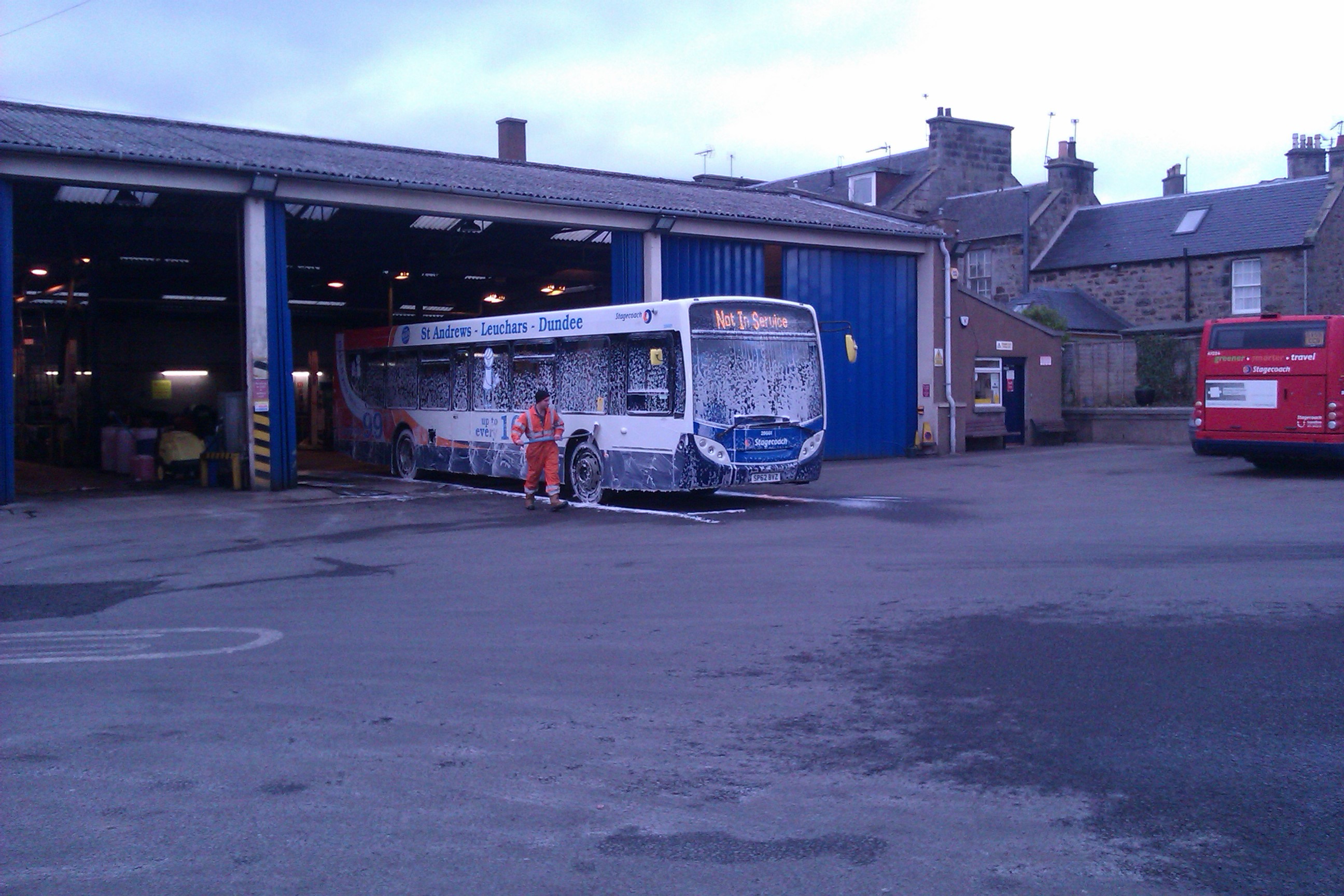
Stagecoach East Scotland's depot in St Andrews

As of February 2025, Stagecoach South Scotland operates 477 buses and coaches from eight depots in its Eastern region:

- Arbroath (Peasiehill Road)
- Blairgowrie (Haugh Road)
- Cowdenbeath (Broad Street) (Rennies)
- Dundee (City Centre Seagate)
- Dunfermline (St Leonards Street)
- Glenrothes (Flemington Road)
- Leven (Methilhaven Road - Aberhill)
- Perth (Ruthvenfield Road)
- St Andrews (City Road)

=== Western region ===
As of 2024, Stagecoach South Scotland operates 315 buses and coaches from its western region:

- Ardrossan (Harbour Road)
- Ayr (Waggon Road)
  - Muirkirk (outstation of Ayr and Kilmarnock)
- Brodick (The Pier) (Isle of Arran)
- Kilmarnock (Mackinlay Place)

== See also ==
- Public transport in Perth and Kinross
