= CAVForth =

Scottish autonomous bus pilot scheme

- Connected Autonomous Vehicles
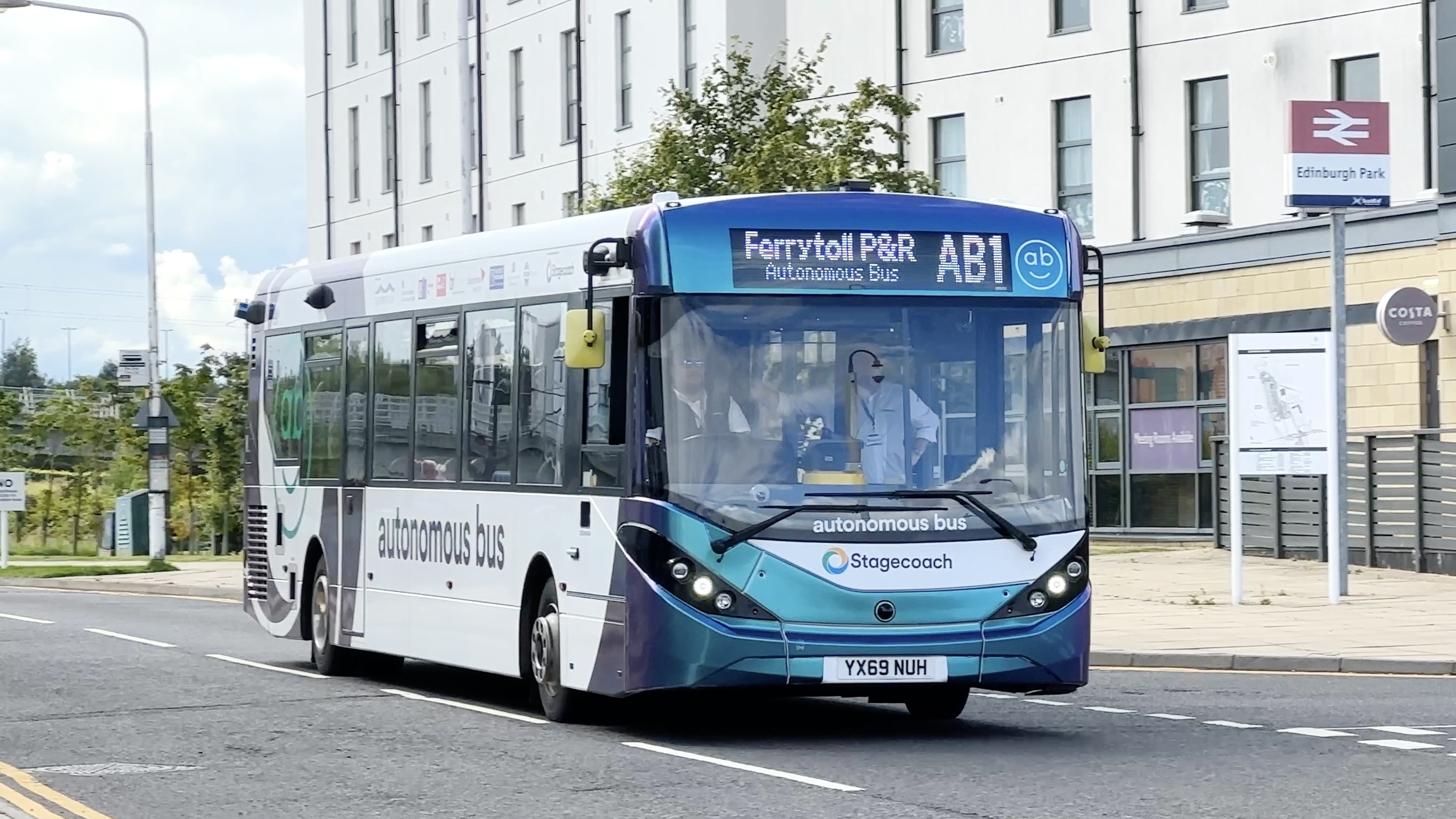
- CAVForth Alexander Dennis Enviro200AV on route AB1 in Edinburgh Park in August 2023

Overview
- Operator: Stagecoach South Scotland
- Vehicle: Alexander Dennis Enviro200AV
- Peak vehicle requirement: 2
- Status: Withdrawn
- Began service: 15 May 2023
- Ended service: 14 February 2025

Route
- Route type: Park and ride
- Start: Ferrytoll Park and Ride
- Via: Forth Road Bridge
- End: Edinburgh Park
- Length: 14 mi (23 km)

Service
- Frequency: 20 minutes
- Operates: Monday’s to Sunday’s
- Timetable: CAVForth timetable
- Buses run to SAE Level 4, meaning a driver does not control the bus but is present in the cab at all times

CAVForth (Connected Autonomous Vehicles) is a pilot scheme based in eastern Scotland to develop passenger-carrying autonomous bus services in the United Kingdom. The scheme's first bus route, the AB1 park and ride service, was operated by Stagecoach South Scotland at a 20-minute frequency between Edinburgh Park and the Ferrytoll Park and Ride site via the Forth Road Bridge.

Described by the UK government as being the first full-size public autonomous bus service in the world, the service, which commenced public operations on 15 May 2023 (and has now ceased operations as of 14 February 2025) uses a fleet of five Alexander Dennis Enviro200AV diesel single-deck buses built to SAE Level 4 requirements, meaning a driver is present in the bus at all times but does not need to control the bus in regular service.

== Development ==
The CAVForth pilot was first announced in November 2018, having secured £4.35 million in part funding from the UK Government's Centre for Connected and Autonomous Vehicles. Bus manufacturer Alexander Dennis constructed an Alexander Dennis Enviro200 MMC equipped with radar, optical cameras, LiDAR and ultrasound sensors to enable self-driving capability, which was subjected to a series of technical trials at Stagecoach Manchester's Sharston depot in March 2019. Tests undertaken by the bus involved parking in a designated space, driving around the depot and through the bus wash. The bus, later rebranded to the Enviro200AV, was trialled again in Glasgow at the CAV Scotland conference at the SEC Centre in November 2019.

The CAVForth scheme has been developed with funding from and partnership between bus manufacturer Alexander Dennis, Fusion Processing, the Stagecoach Group, Transport Scotland, the Napier University and the Bristol Robotics Laboratory. The pilot scheme was set to commence passenger-carrying service as early as mid-2020, however delays due to the COVID-19 pandemic saw the first trials of five Enviro200AVs limited to 50 mph (80 km/h) along the CAVForth1 route take place over two weeks in April 2022. The first passenger-carrying trials of the CAVForth Enviro200AVs eventually took place in January 2023.

The CAVForth scheme's first route, numbered AB1, was launched on 11 May 2023 by Scottish Minister for Transport Kevin Stewart, ahead of the route commencing public operations on 15 May. An additional £10.4 million of funding was secured for an extension to Dunfermline named CAVForth2 in February 2023.

== Routes ==
=== AB1 ===
Service AB1 was a conventional park and ride service that operates at a 30-minute frequency 7 days a week between Edinburgh Park and the Ferrytoll Park and Ride site in Fife via the M8, M9 and M90 motorways as well as the Forth Road Bridge, with a projected capacity of 10,000 passenger journeys per week on the 14 mi (23 km) service.

The service commenced operations on 15 May 2023 using a fleet of five Enviro200AVs operated by Stagecoach East Scotland, each crewed by a safety driver in the driver's seat and a 'bus captain' who will assist passengers boarding the service. This was reduced to a single Enviro200AV during 2024, then in December 2024, Stagecoach East Scotland announced they were withdrawing the AB1 on 14 February 2025 due to low passenger numbers making the service unsustainable to run.

=== CAVForth2 ===
CAVForth2 will serve as an extension of CAVForth1, travelling a distance of 20 mi (32 km) between Edinburgh Park and Dunfermline via the Forth Road Bridge and the Ferrytoll Park and Ride site. Stagecoach East Scotland (Now Stagecoach South Scotland) plans to install self-driving technology in pre-existing diesel buses for operation on CAVForth2, while an Alexander Dennis Enviro100AEV battery electric midibus, equipped with the same technology as the larger Enviro200AV, is planned to be used for engineering trials.
