= Alexander Dennis Enviro200 MMC =

Low-floor single-decker bus

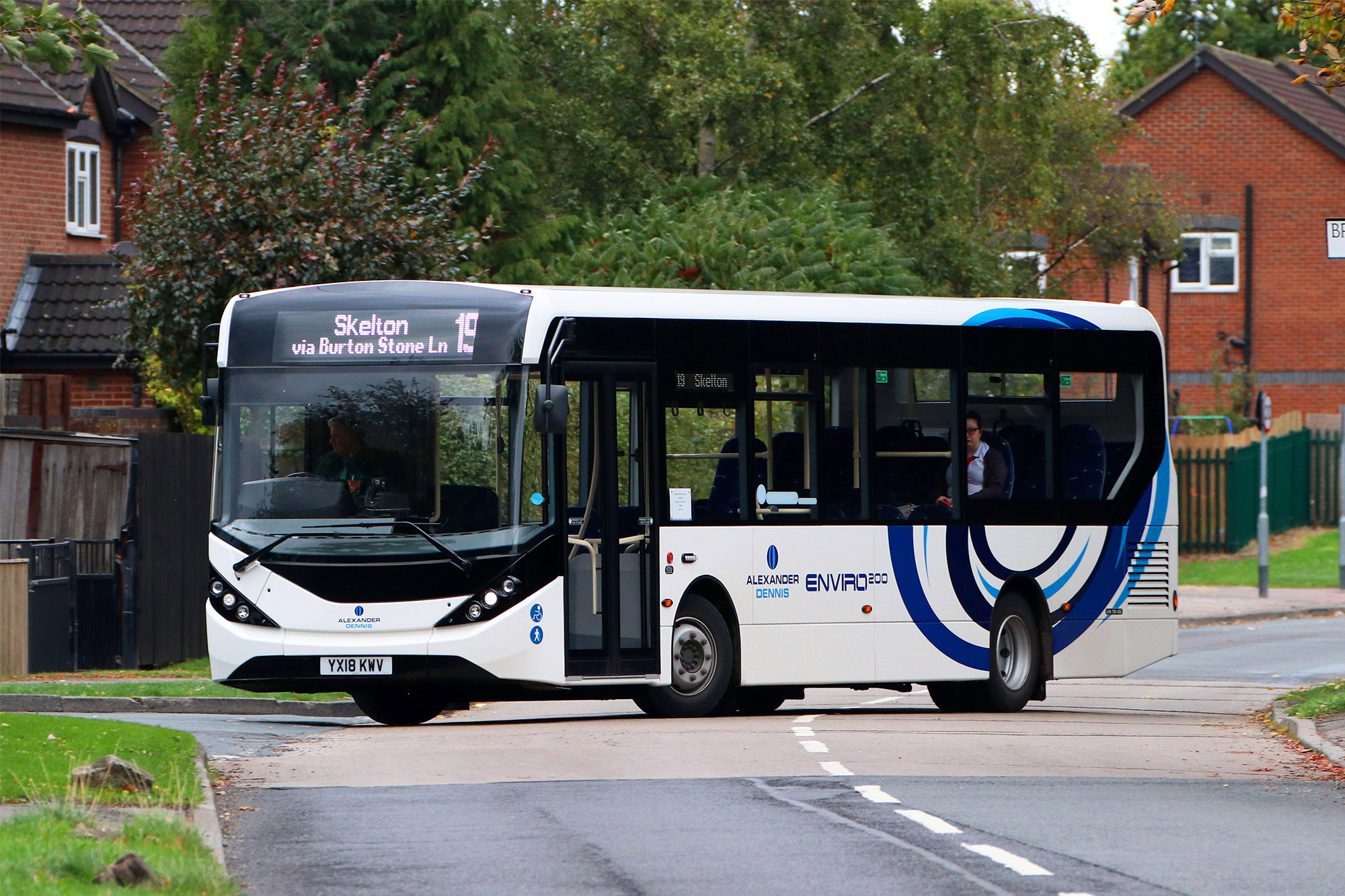
- Enviro200 MMC demonstrator operated by Yorkshire Coastliner in October 2018

Overview
- Manufacturer: Alexander Dennis
- Production: 2014–present

Body and chassis
- Doors: 1 or 2 doors
- Floor type: Low floor
- Chassis: Integral
- Related: Alexander Dennis Enviro200EV; Alexander Dennis Enviro400 MMC

Powertrain
- Engine: Cummins ISBe 4.5l (UK versions, all but 11.8m); Cummins ISBe 6.7l (UK version 11.8m only, NZ/HK export versions)
- Capacity: 30–43 seated
- Power output: 180–250 hp (130–190 kW)
- Transmission: Voith DIWA.6 (D824.6 Auto 4-speed) (2014-present); Allison 2100 (Auto 5/6-speed) (2014-2022); ZF AS Lite (auto/manual 6-speed) (2014-2022)

Dimensions
- Length: 8.9 m (29 ft 2 in); 9.7 m (31 ft 10 in); 10.2 m (33 ft 6 in); 10.8 m (35 ft 5 in); 11.5 m (37 ft 9 in); 11.8 m (38 ft 9 in); 12.8 m (42 ft 0 in)
- Width: 2.44 m (8 ft 0 in)
- Height: 2.86 m (9 ft 5 in)
- Curb weight: 13–14.4 t (12.8–14.2 long tons; 14.3–15.9 short tons)

Chronology
- Predecessor: Alexander Dennis Enviro200; Alexander Dennis Enviro300

The Alexander Dennis Enviro200 MMC, also marketed as the Alexander Dennis Enviro200, is a single-decker city bus produced by British manufacturer Alexander Dennis since 2014 as the successor to the Enviro200 midibus and Enviro300 full-size bus.

The Enviro200 MMC is available over a range of lengths, including 8.9 metres, 9.7 metres, 10.8 metres and 11.5/11.8 metres, as an integral twin-axle midibus or full-size bus. Additionally, the 12.7 metre tri-axle Enviro200 XLB is offered in the New Zealand market. The Enviro200 MMC bodywork is also available as an all-electric bus, known as the Alexander Dennis Enviro200EV, built on a BYD Auto battery electric chassis. Notably, some Enviro200 MMCs have also been modified by Fusion Processing to be used as the basis for the first driverless bus trials in the United Kingdom.

== Introduction ==
The Enviro200 MMC can trace its lineage back to the original Dennis Dart midibus, introduced by Dennis Specialist Vehicles in 1989. One of the most successful bus models of all time, the original Dart was replaced by the low-floor Dart SLF in 1996. Through financial difficulties at the various parent companies, production of the Dart SLF passed first to TransBus International in 2001 and subsequently to Alexander Dennis in 2004.

The second-generation Alexander Dennis Enviro200 - then branded as the Enviro200 Dart - was introduced as the Dart SLF's replacement in 2006, based very strongly on the design of the previous model. The third-generation Enviro200 was launched in 2009, followed by the Enviro200 MMC in 2015. Production of the classic third-generation Enviro200 ultimately ceased in late 2018.

== Variants ==
=== Enviro200 MMC ===
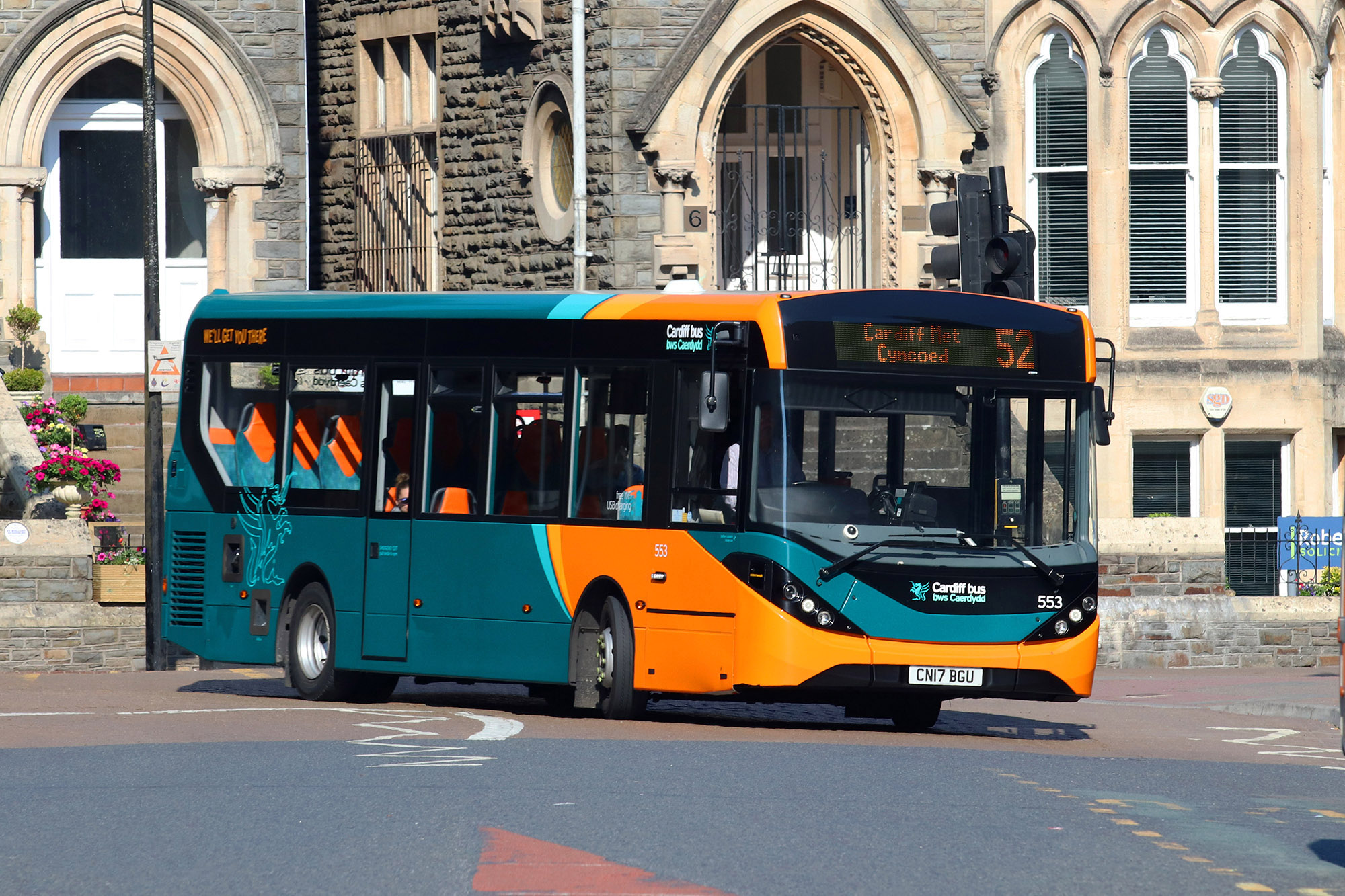
Cardiff Bus Enviro200 MMC in June 2018

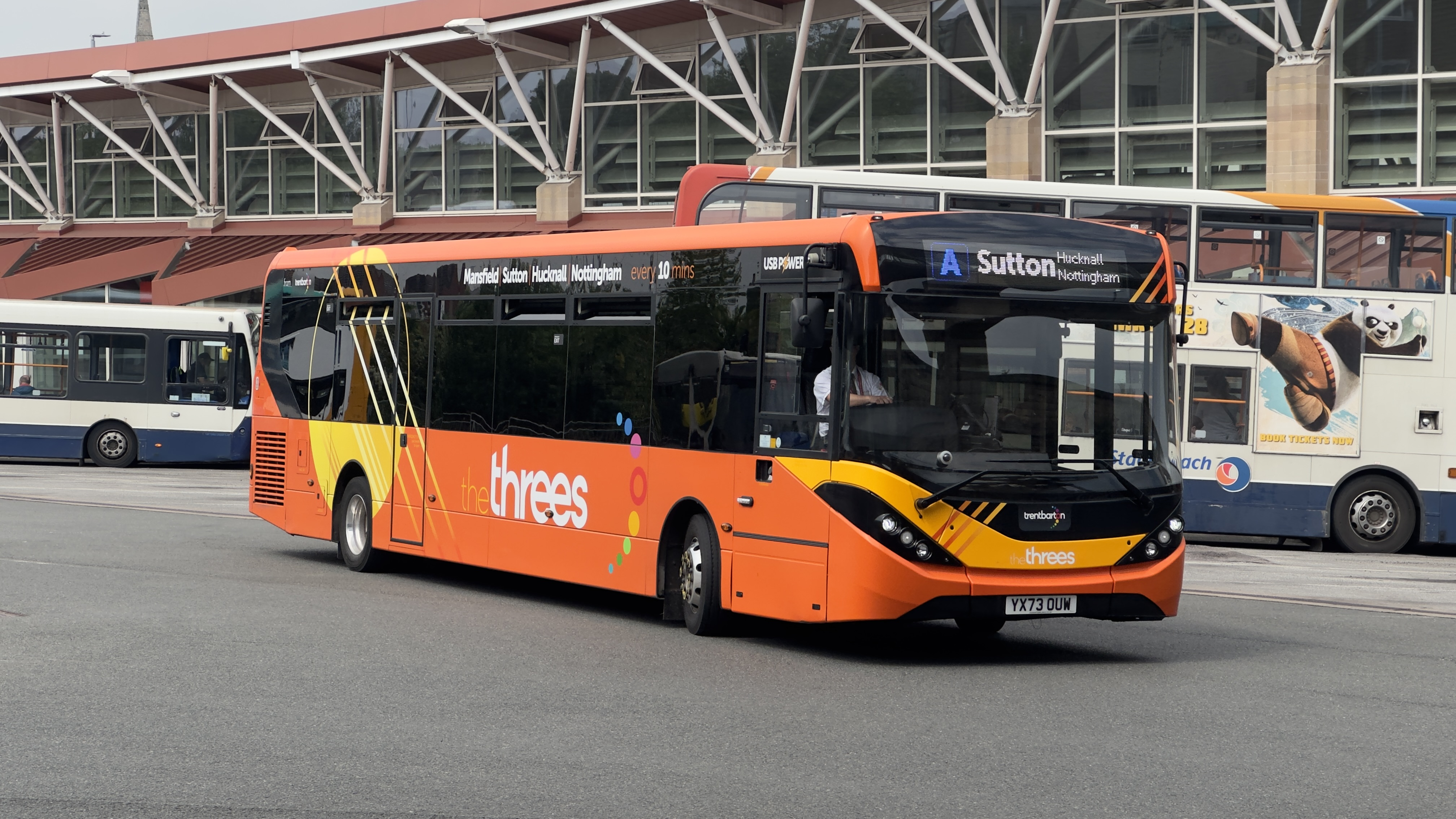
Trentbarton 'threes' branded Enviro200 MMC at Mansfield bus station in May 2024

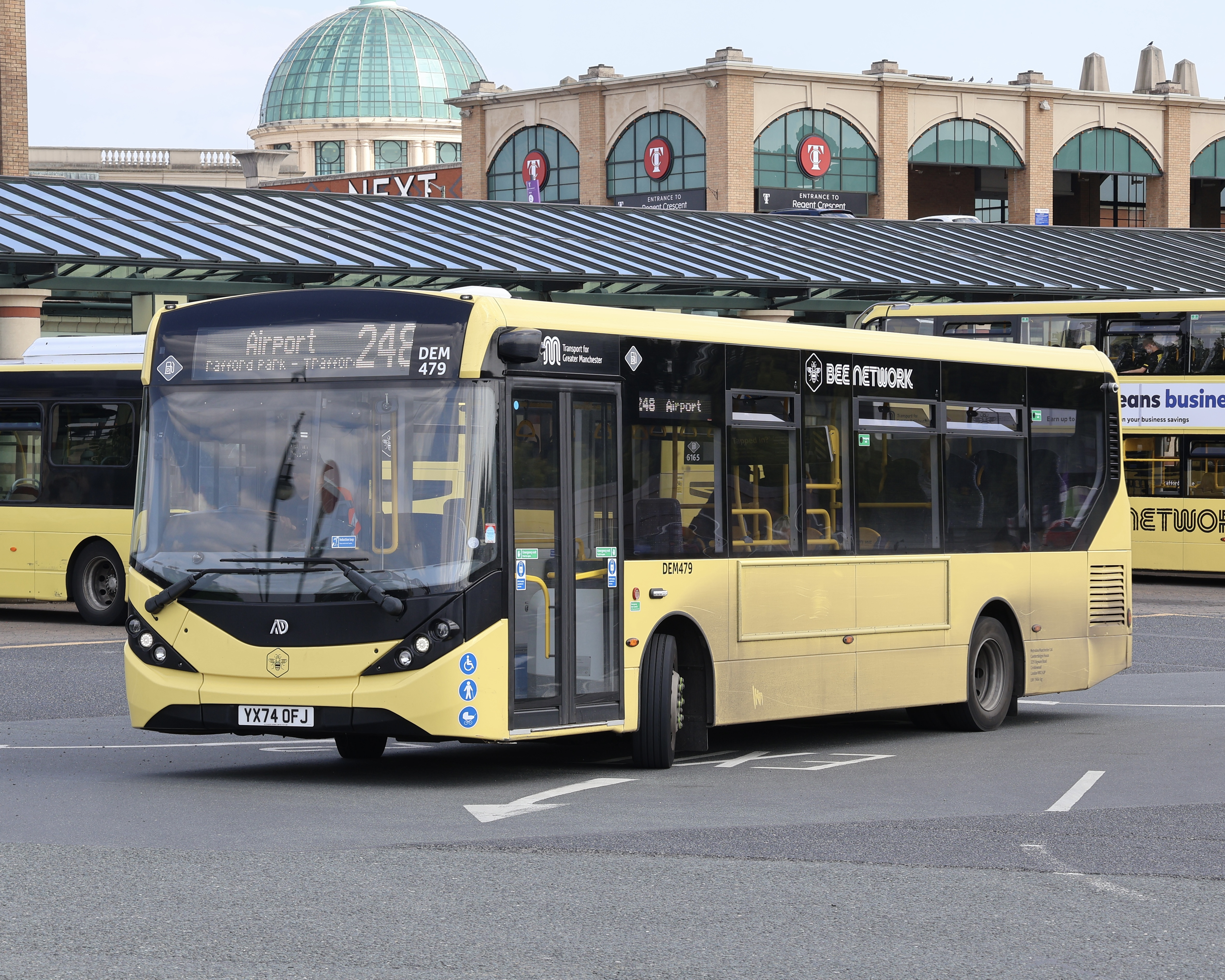
Metroline Manchester Bee Network branded Enviro200 MMC at the Trafford Centre in June 2025

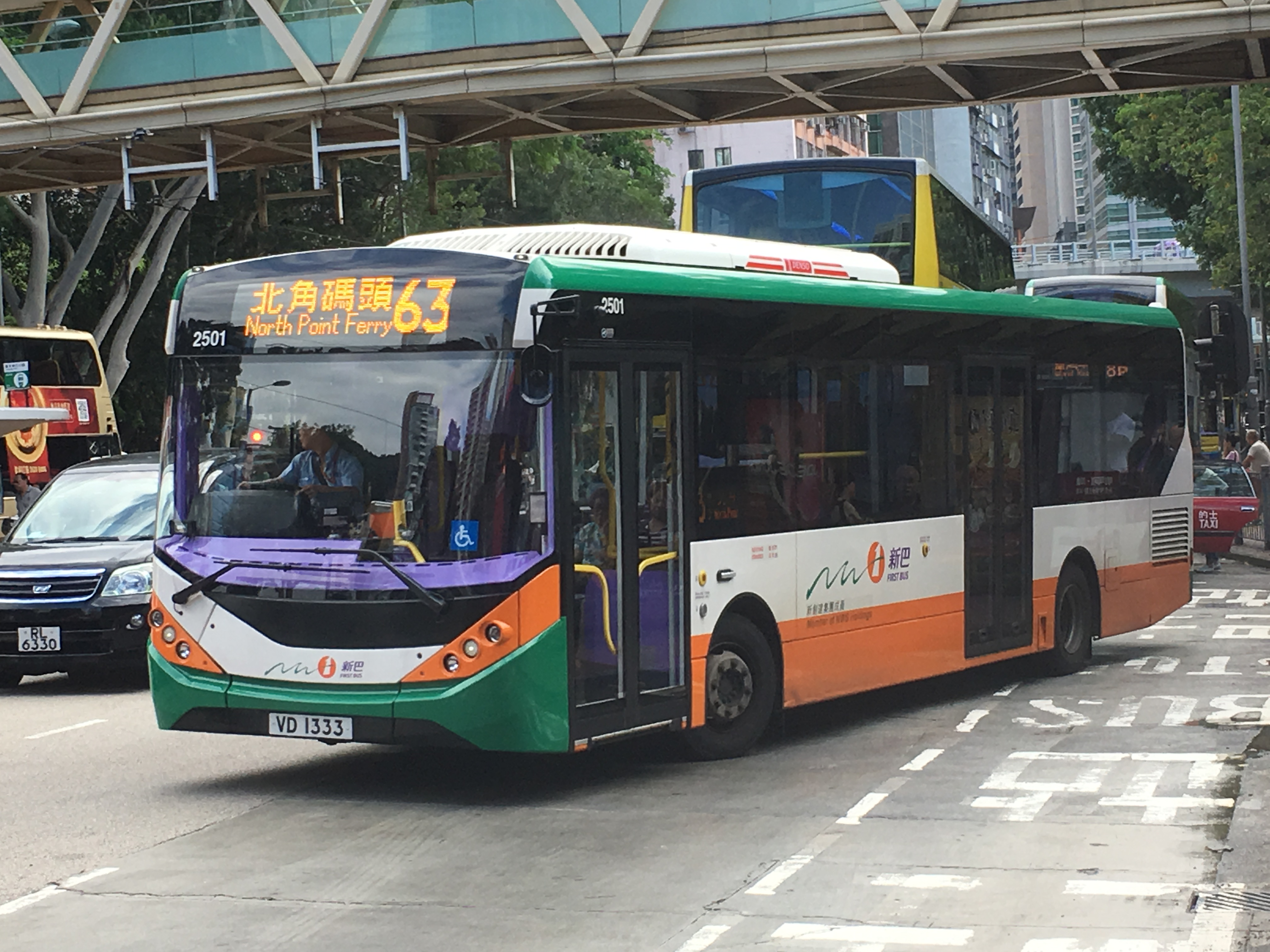
New World First Bus Enviro200 MMC in Victoria Park, Hong Kong in September 2018

Alexander Dennis unveiled the Enviro200 MMC (short for Major Model Change) at the Euro Bus Expo in Birmingham in November 2014. As well as replacing the classic Enviro200, it also superseded the Enviro300. The first production examples of the Enviro200 MMC entered service with National Express West Midlands in 2015, the operator having ordered 50 of the type.

Go South Coast were early customers of the Enviro200 MMC, with a first batch of 18 delivered to Bluestar in late 2015. Twelve more were delivered to Bluestar in 2016, followed by a third batch in 2019, some of which had air filters mounted on the roof following successful trials in Southampton. Swindon's Bus Company had 13 Enviro200 MMCs delivered in 2017, followed by another batch of six in 2020, and Morebus had 40 Enviro200 MMCs delivered in 2018 for their m1/m2 services between Bournemouth and Poole.

The Stagecoach Group, the founders of which were shareholders of Alexander Dennis until 2019, operate a large number of Enviro200 MMCs across the group's operations in England, Wales and Scotland. After a first batch of eight built to Transport for London specification entered service with Stagecoach London in October 2015, Stagecoach's first regional Enviro200 MMCs entered service with Stagecoach South, Stagecoach East Scotland, Stagecoach Oxfordshire and Stagecoach Yorkshire between November 2015 and February 2016. Further examples have entered service with Stagecoach North East, who received eighteen for services in Newcastle upon Tyne in December 2016, Stagecoach East Midlands, where Enviro200 MMCs were introduced for services in Lincoln and Hull as well as on the Humber Fastcat service to Scunthorpe, and Stagecoach South West, where 14 Enviro200 MMCs entered service in Exeter in 2018. Some delivered to Stagecoach have been built to the company's high standard Stagecoach Gold specification, with 24 such Enviro200 MMCs delivered to Stagecoach South Wales in 2016, and another 25 being delivered to Stagecoach Midlands in 2018.

The FirstGroup are another significant operator of Enviro200 MMCs, making significant purchases of the type throughout 2015 and 2016. 32 Enviro200 MMCs were delivered to First Glasgow in November 2015 as part of a larger vehicle investment for the city, followed by the delivery of seven high-specification Enviro200 MMCs in January 2016 to upgrade First Aberdeen's route 13 to 'Platinum' specification. Smaller batches of Enviro200 MMCs were also delivered to First South Yorkshire for services in Sheffield, First Essex, First Potteries, First Cymru and for First Glasgow's express services to Glasgow Airport.

Arriva UK Bus also operate a number of Enviro200 MMCs. The company first took on Enviro200 MMCs in early 2016, which were delivered to Arriva London for service on route B13. The first orders for an Arriva subsidiary outside London was delivered to Arriva Shires & Essex in 2017, with 14 of the type delivered for services in Luton. Elsewhere in 2017, Yorkshire Tiger launched six Enviro200 MMCs for 'Flying Tiger' services connecting Bradford and Harrogate with Leeds Bradford Airport. 27 more Enviro200 MMCs were delivered to Arriva Midlands, Arriva North East and Arriva Southern Counties in mid-2022.

Wellglade Group companies Trent Barton and Kinchbus had 156 Enviro200 MMCs in total delivered between 2016 and 2023. These buses were delivered in various route-branded liveries, such as for the 'Skylink' service to East Midlands Airport, and all feature high-specification interiors. A further 29 for use on the 'Ilkeston Flyer', 'the Villager', the H1 and 'the Mickleover' services are on order for delivery in summer 2024.

Nine Enviro200 MMCs were delivered to East Yorkshire Motor Services across two batches in 2017. Following the company's acquisition by Go North East, a pair of Enviro200 MMCs were delivered for two rural services in 2019 and eight more were delivered to Scarborough for the 'Scarborough Sevens' operation later that year. This was accompanied by deliveries of 11 Enviro200 MMCs to Go North East for its 'Green Arrow' service.

Transdev Blazefield first took five Enviro200 MMCs for its York & Country operation in 2019 after the company won five service contracts in York. A further 13 Enviro200 MMCs with high specification interiors were delivered to the Blackburn Bus Company in January 2020.

Rotala operator and Transport for Greater Manchester contractor Diamond North West took delivery of 67 Enviro200 MMCs between late 2023 and early 2024, intended for use on bus services tendered to Diamond through the Bee Network bus franchising scheme. 52 Enviro200 MMCs were also delivered to Go North West earlier in 2023 for use on services franchised under Tranche 1 of the scheme. Metroline Manchester took delivery of 50 Enviro200 MMCs in two batches, stored in Wythenshawe garage until their entry into service under Tranche 3 from 5 January 2025, while Stagecoach Manchester took delivery of seven in total in two batches for the rollouts of Tranches 2 and 3. Arriva North West, meanwhile, began taking delivery of 56 Enviro200 MMCs for use on the Liverpool City Region's franchised Metro services from November 2024 onwards, with up to 170 more to be delivered to LCR Metro franchise operators between 2026 and 2027.

Other operators include McGills Bus Services, who took delivery of 26 Enviro200 MMCs in 2019, with 15 of the batch specified to be built to 11.5m length while the remaining eleven were specified to 10.4m length. 44 were also delivered to Go Cornwall Bus in 2020, shortly after the launch of the company's new tendered bus network. Two pairs of Enviro200 MMCs were purchased on lease to Thames Valley Buses in 2022, while Cardiff Bus ordered ten Enviro200 MMCs in 2017. A pair of Enviro200 MMCs were delivered from stock to Rotala subsidiary Preston Bus on short-term notice in September 2024, followed by a further batch of 21 during 2025. A further 21 were delivered to Rotala's Diamond West Midlands operation in February 2026.

The Enviro200 MMC is also popular with independently-run companies, many of which are either bought outright or leased to the operator through lessors such as Mistral. Among these include Moffat and Williamson of Fife, who took seven in 2017, Delaine Buses, who purchase two annually and operate five of the type as of September 2022, Edwards Coaches, Whitelaws Coaches, Go Goodwins, and Kev's Cars and Coaches.

=== BYD Enviro200EV ===
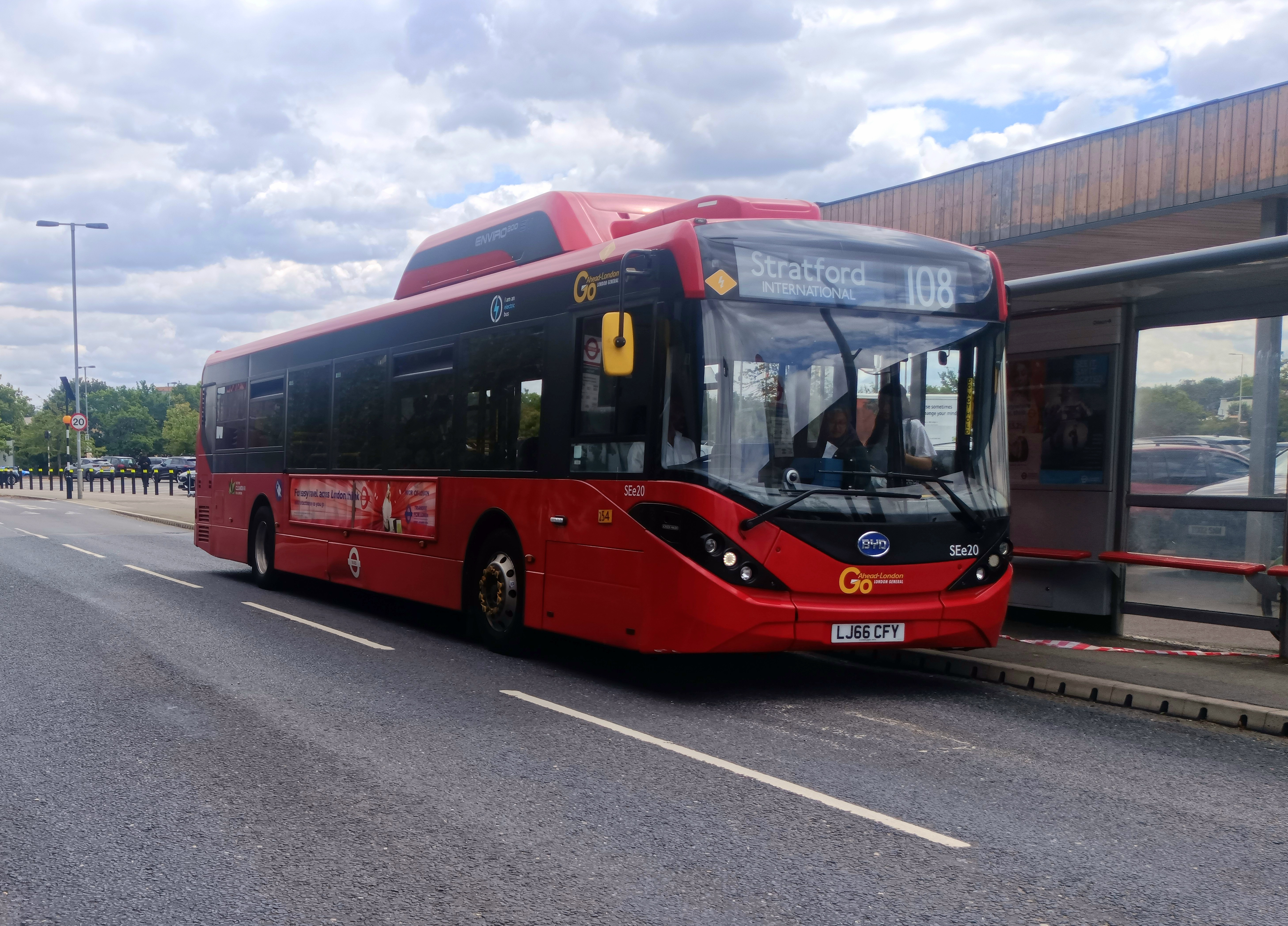
London Central BYD Enviro200EV at Greenwich Peninsula in July 2025

The Alexander Dennis Enviro200EV is a single-deck bus that runs on battery electric power. It has been produced since 2015 by the British company Alexander Dennis in partnership with the Chinese electric vehicle manufacturer BYD Auto. The Enviro200EV is an all-electric variant of the Enviro200 MMC.

=== Enviro200 XLB ===
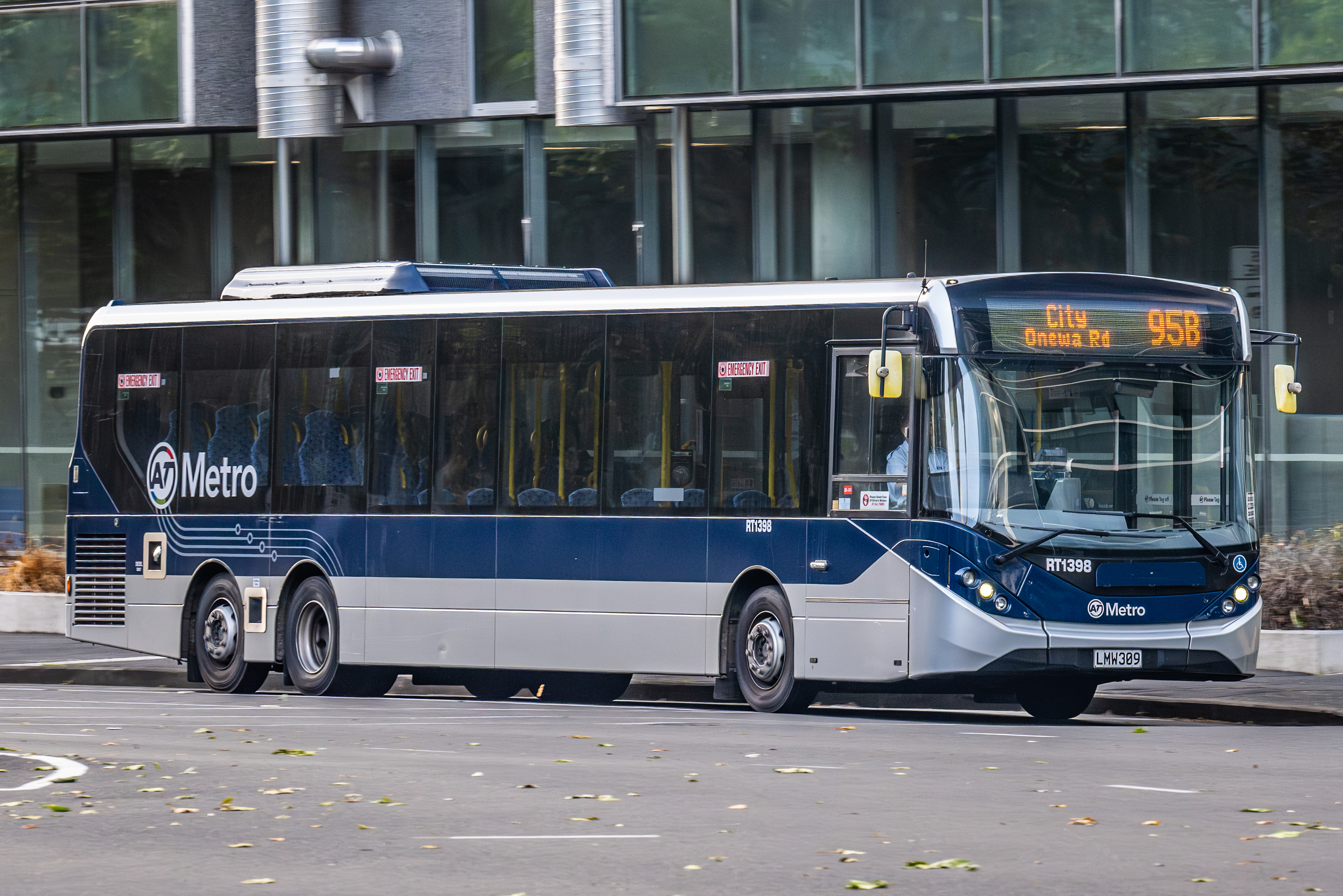
Ritchies Transport Enviro200XLB in downtown Auckland in 2024

In 2017, a 12.8 metre tri-axle version of the Enviro200 MMC, named the Enviro200 XLB, was launched for the New Zealand market. Significant investment in the vehicle type has been seen across the country, with Ritchies Transport purchasing 28 for their Auckland operations, and Birkenhead Transport acquiring 25 examples.

=== Enviro200AV ===
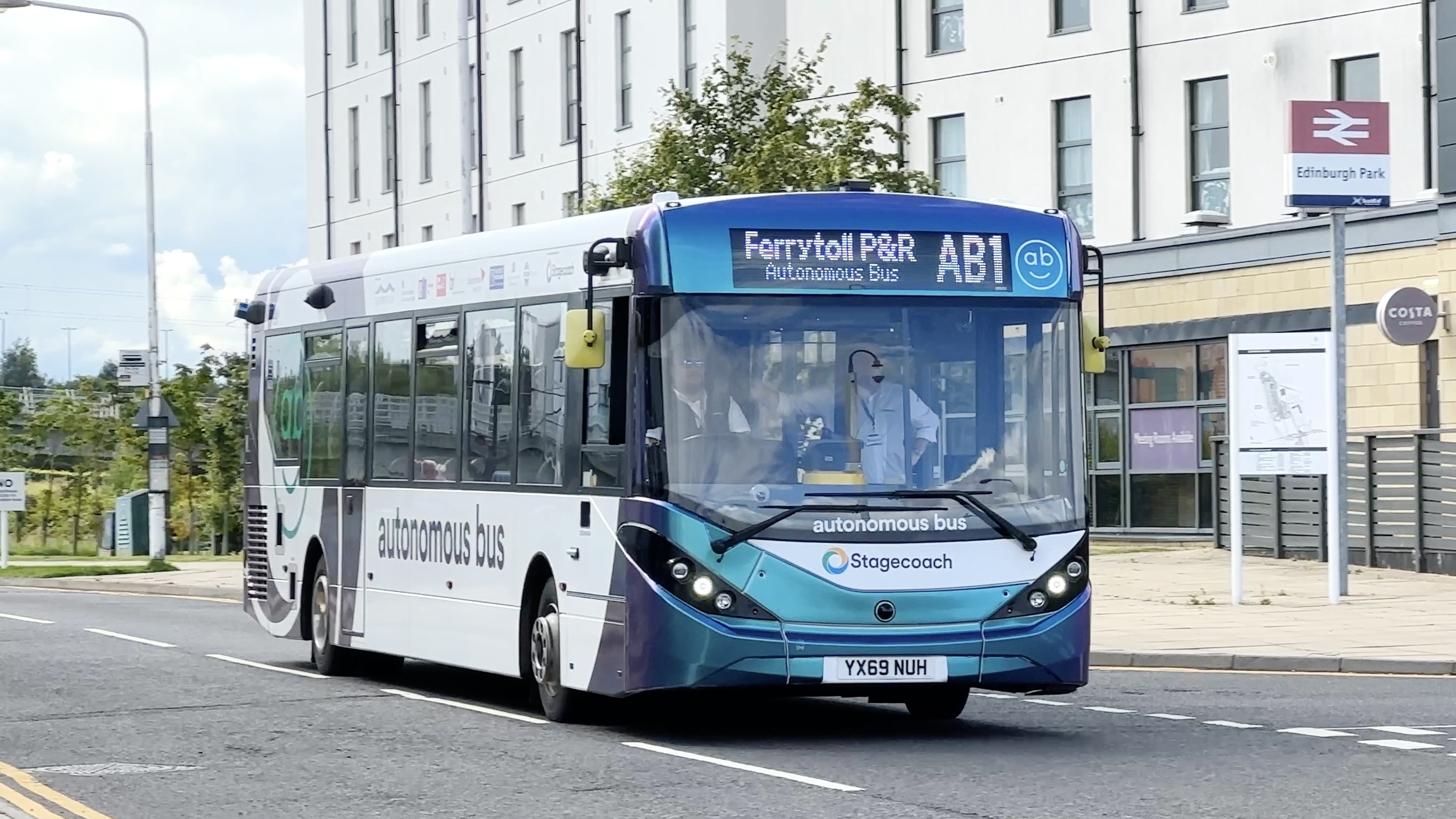
CAVForth Enviro200AV autonomous bus operated by Stagecoach East Scotland in August 2023

The first autonomous bus trial in the United Kingdom commenced in mid-2019, with an Enviro200 MMC modified with SAE Level 4 autonomous software from Fusion Processing able to operate in driverless mode within Stagecoach Manchester's Sharston bus depot, performing tasks such as driving to the washing station, refuelling point and then parking up at a dedicated parking space in the depot. Enviro200 MMCs with this autonomous technology were later marketed by Alexander Dennis as the Enviro200AV.

A passenger-carrying driverless bus service named CAVForth commenced operations on 15 May 2023 using a fleet of five Enviro200AVs built to the same specifications as the Manchester trial vehicle on a 14 miles (23 km) Stagecoach East Scotland park-and-ride route across the Forth Road Bridge, from the north bank of the Forth to Edinburgh Park station. The pilot service, partly funded by the UK government's Centre for Connected and Autonomous Vehicles (CCAV), employs twenty personnel recruited by Stagecoach, which includes 'safety drivers' who occupy the cab and monitor the driverless technology as well as 'bus captains', similar to the role of a bus conductor, who will assist passengers boarding the service.

Non-passenger testing of the Enviro200AVs along the park-and-ride route commenced for a period of two weeks in April 2022; passengers were first carried on the buses during further testing in January 2023. Four of the five Enviro200AVs entered service on the AB1 service upon the launch of the route in May 2023; one was briefly exported to Dubai for trials with the emirate's Roads and Transport Authority.

== See also ==
- List of buses
- Alexander Dennis
