= Transport in Liverpool =

Liverpool is a major city in North West England with significant road, rail, and ferry networks, in addition to an international airport and a well-known dock system. As with most other major UK cities, Liverpool's transport infrastructure is centred on its road and rail networks. Public transport services within the city are controlled and run by Merseytravel.

The road network in and around Liverpool is primarily managed by the relevant local authority in which the roads are located, although (in common with all parts of the UK outside of London) the major trunk roads, in England, are the responsibility of National Highways.

== Road ==
=== Cars ===
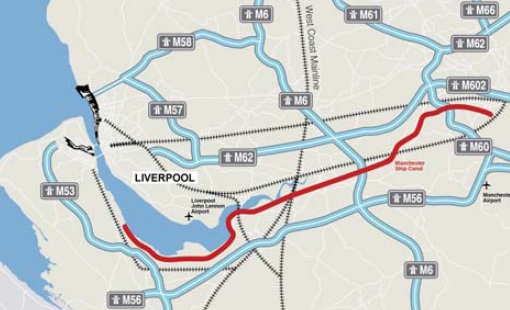
Motorways of the Liverpool City Region

Liverpool has direct road links with many other major areas of England. The A5058 road / Queens Drive inner ring road was completed in 1927, the A580 road / East Lancs Road (the UK's first inter-city highway) to Salford was opened in 1934, and the M57 motorway outer ring road was completed and opened in 1974. The west to east M62 motorway connects Liverpool (since completion of junction 4 in 1976) with Hull, and also provides a link with areas including Manchester, Leeds, and Huddersfield. Not far along the M62 from Liverpool is the interchange with the north to south M6 that provides links to more distant areas including Birmingham, Staffordshire, the Lake District and the border with Scotland. The M58 motorway, completed in 1980, provides a faster link from Liverpool to the northbound M6 west of Wigan.

The Kingsway road tunnel gives direct access to the M53 motorway, which runs east to the M56. The north-south M6 has a junction with the M56. The Queensway road tunnel gives a direct link to the A41 that eventually leads to London, although using the M62 or M6 and eventually M1 is a far quicker route from Liverpool to London. However, the A41 is a relatively quick and direct link with Cheshire and Shropshire. This in turn provides a quick link to the A55 road that runs along the North Wales coastline.

In the early 1960s, there were plans to build a "Liverpool Inner Motorway" which would have been similar to the "urban motorways" which were later built around the cities of Manchester and Leeds. The motorway was still a possibility as the 1970s drew to a close, but it was never built. The only section built was from Leeds Street in the north of the city centre, south along the dock road to Parliament Street.

=== Buses ===
Merseytravel acts as the responsible authority for the planning and commissioning of local bus services in Liverpool and throughout the wider Merseyside area. Currently, Arriva and Stagecoach provide the vast majority of local bus services within the city, with a number of smaller operators providing specific routes where there is a defined public need. For-profit bus operators within Liverpool are given extensive public subsidising by the taxpayer, to the cost of £60 million each year. In 2022, a new maximum £2 fare for single bus journeys was introduced within the region across all operators, bringing down the average price of a single fare.

It is the ambition of Liverpool City Region Mayor Steve Rotheram to get bus services within the region up to a 'London-standard' of service quality. As part of this ambition, a new integrated smart ticketing system with fare capping will be introduced, and under the provisions of the Bus Services Act 2017, a new public franchising model will be launched across the Liverpool City Region from 2026 onwards, under which operators can bid for Merseytravel contracts to run buses under the Metro brand.

Long-distance coach services arrive at and depart from the National Express stop at Liverpool One bus station. Local buses serve the whole of the city and its surrounding areas. The two principal termini for local buses are Queen Square Bus Station (located near Lime Street railway station) for services north, east, and west of the city, and Liverpool One bus station (located near the Albert Dock) for services to the south and east.

Tour bus services from City Sights and City Explorer by Maghull coaches operate in the city centre.

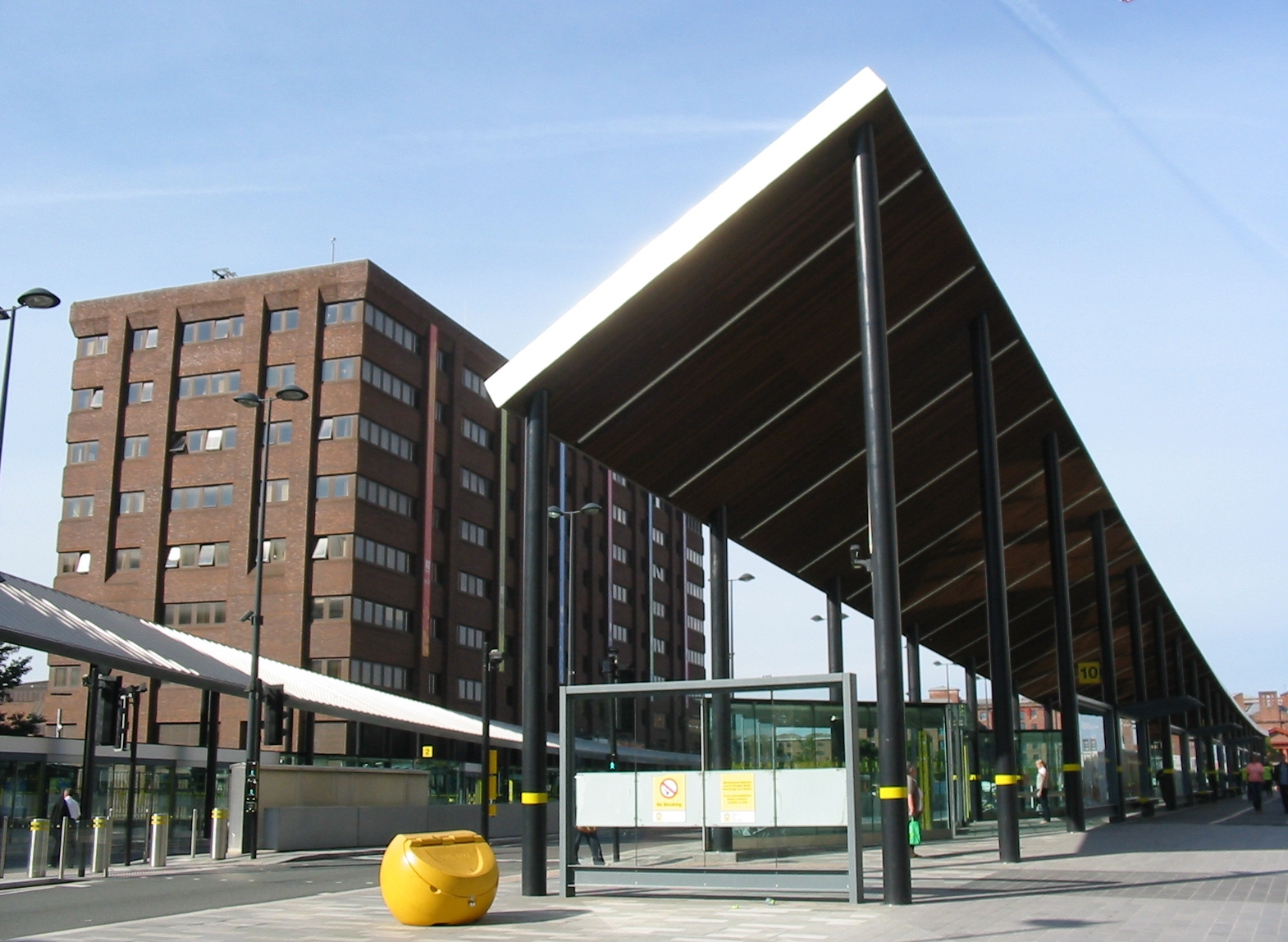
Liverpool One Canning Place bus station

Queen Square bus station

A Metro bus operated by Stagecoach Merseyside & South Lancashire

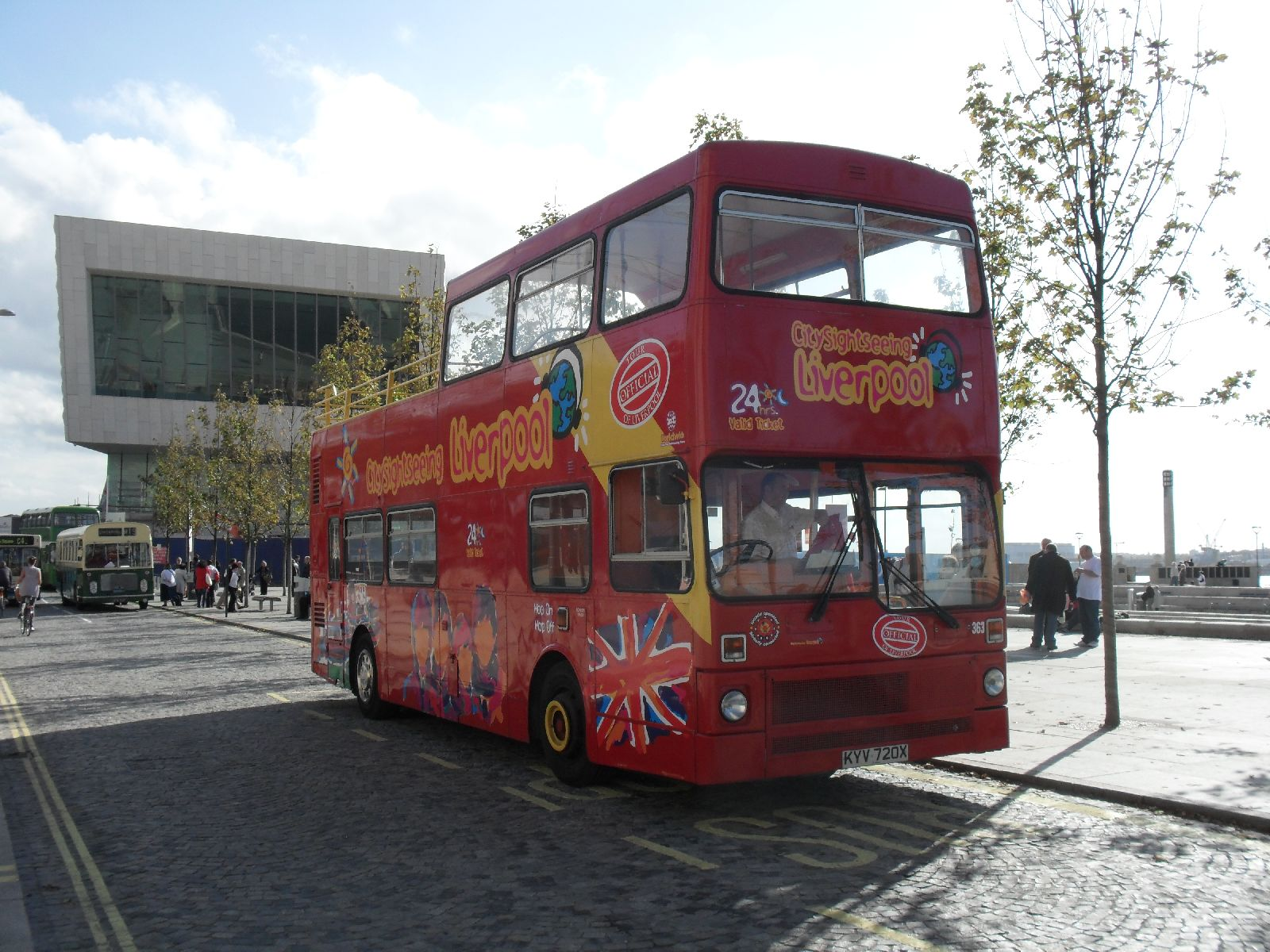
CitySightseeing bus

=== Cycling ===
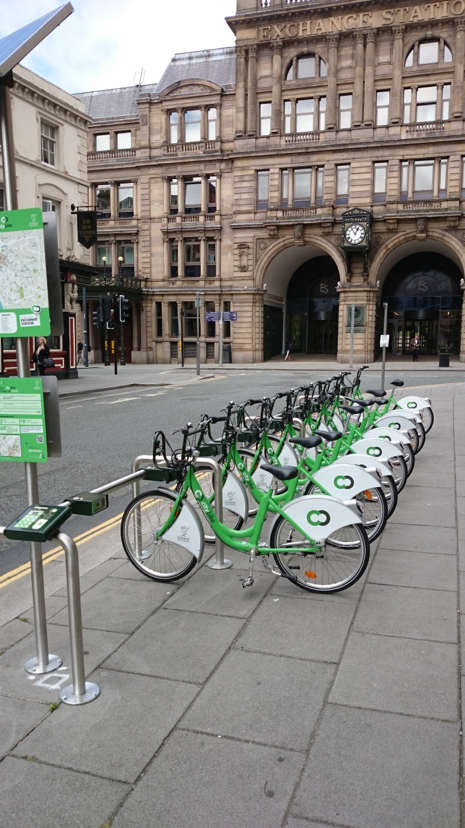
Moorfields, near Exchange St

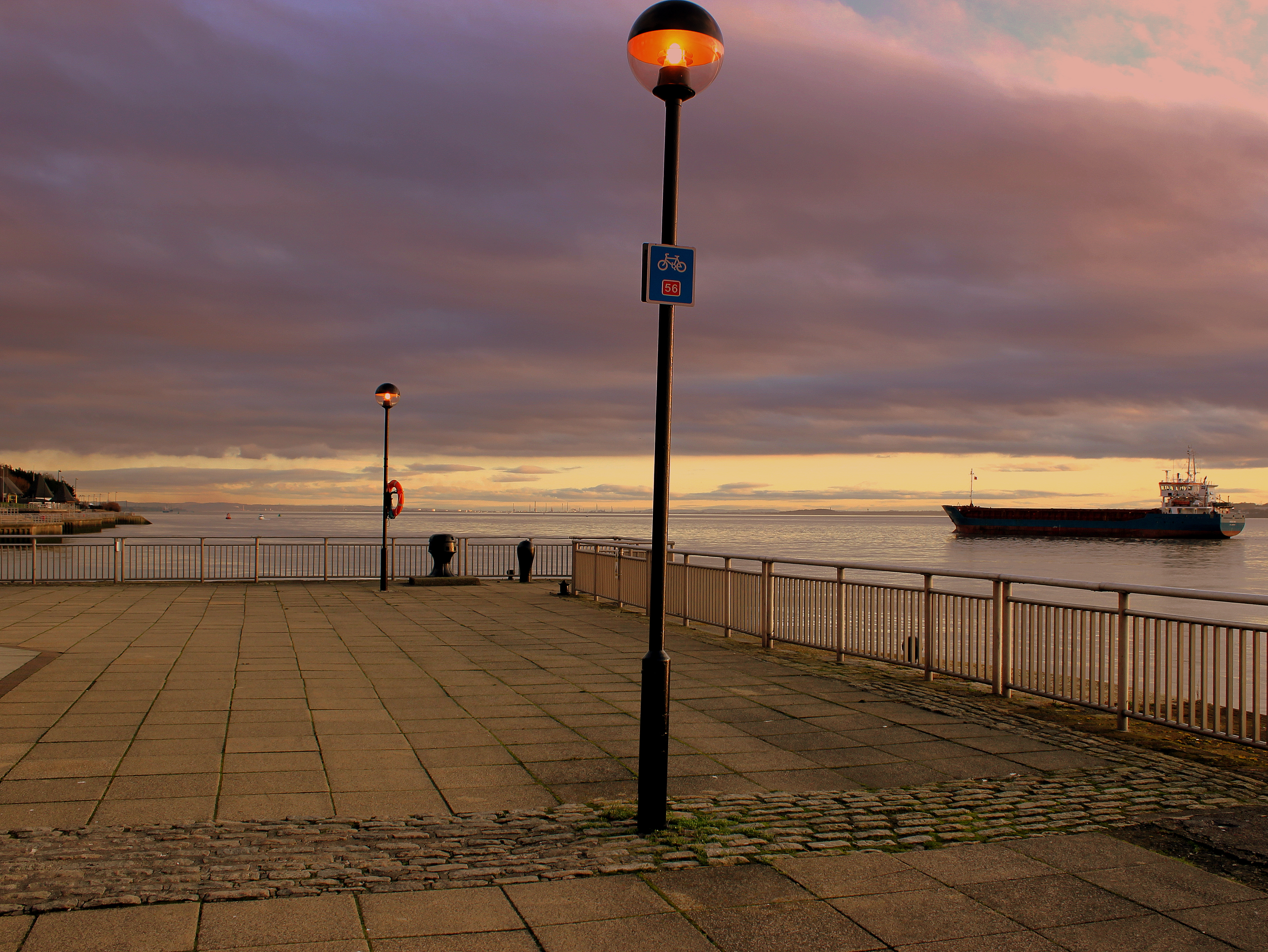
NCN 56, Armstrong Quay off Riverside Drive

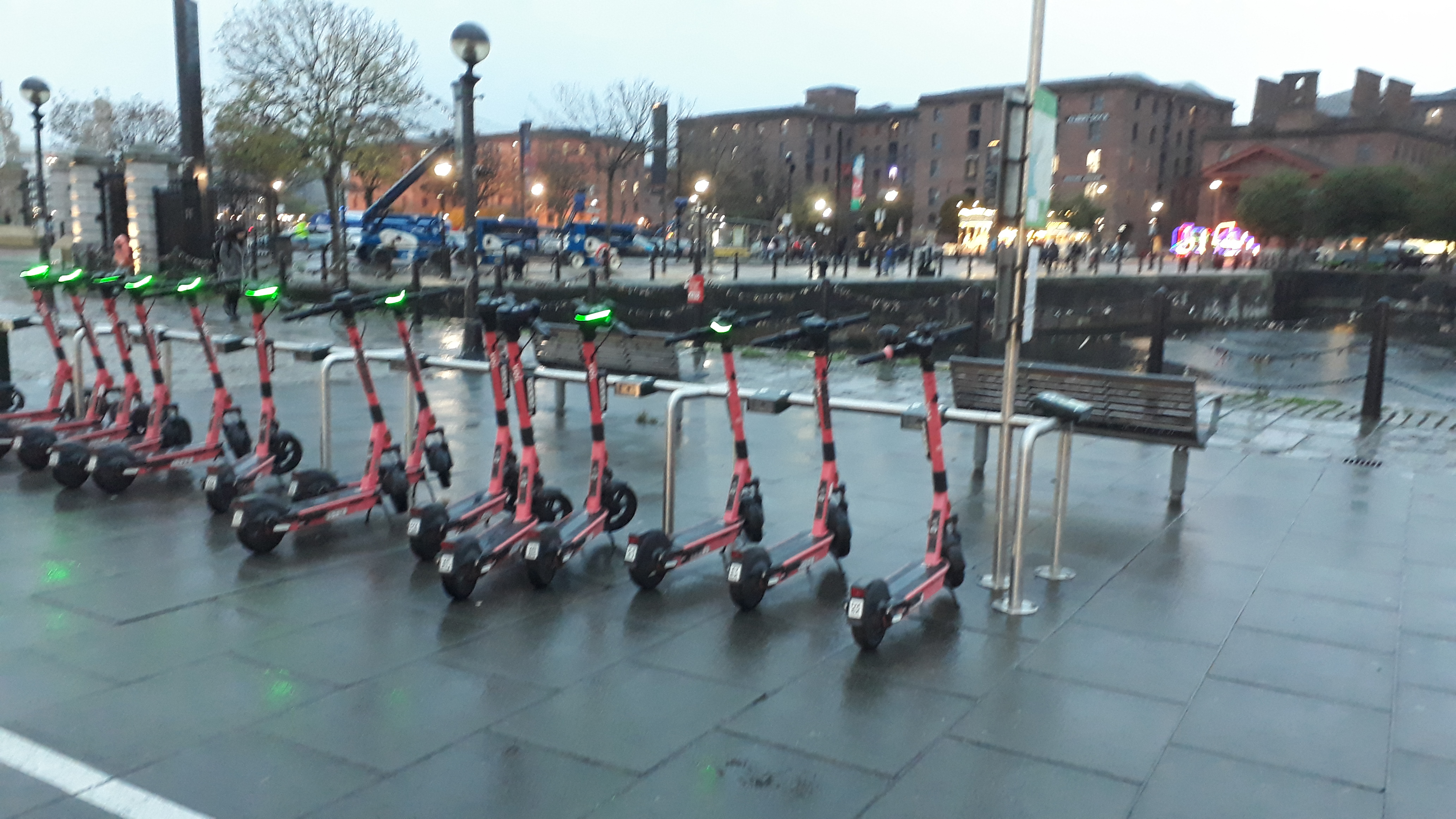
VOI scooters outside the Albert Dock gate

National Cycle Route 56, National Cycle Route 62 (along the former North Liverpool Extension Line) and National Cycle Route 810 passes through Liverpool. In 2020 VOI e-scooter-sharing system launched in Liverpool.

== Rail ==
Liverpool has a proud tradition in locomotive history. The Liverpool and Manchester Railway was the first steam-powered railway; established in 1830, it pioneered what society understands trainlines to be today. The Mersey Railway was the second underground line in the world, opened in 1886. The first ever elevated train line and what could be conceived as a metro today, the Liverpool Overhead Railway first started ferrying dockers in 1893, ending its life with decreased ridership in 1957.

Today, Liverpool is served by two separate rail networks. The local urban rail network, which is underground in the centres of Liverpool and Birkenhead, is managed and run by Merseyrail and serves the whole of Merseyside, also providing links beyond. The national mainline network, which is managed by Network Rail, provides Liverpool with connections to major towns and cities across England.

=== Local ===
Map of the Merseyrail network and Northern-operated City Line.

Liverpool's local hybrid suburban-urban rail network is known as Merseyrail and consists of two lines: the Northern line, which runs to Southport, Ormskirk, and Kirkby to the north of the city and Hunts Cross to the south. The Wirral line, which runs through the Mersey Railway Tunnel and has branches to New Brighton, West Kirby, Chester, and Ellesmere Port.

The City Line is mostly operated by Northern. It begins at Lime Street and provides links to St Helens, Wigan, Preston, Warrington, and Manchester. The Northern and Wirral lines of the network are electrified while diesel and electric trains operate on the separate City line.

Services on the Northern and Wirral lines are operated by Merseyrail and managed by Merseytravel. This electric network covers 75 miles (121 km) of track, with an average of 100,000 passenger journeys per weekday. Local services on the City Line are mainly operated by Northern rather than Merseyrail, although the line contains some Merseyrail branding.

Within the city centre, the majority of the network is underground, with four city centre stations and over 6.5 miles (10.5 km) of tunnels.

=== Mainline services ===
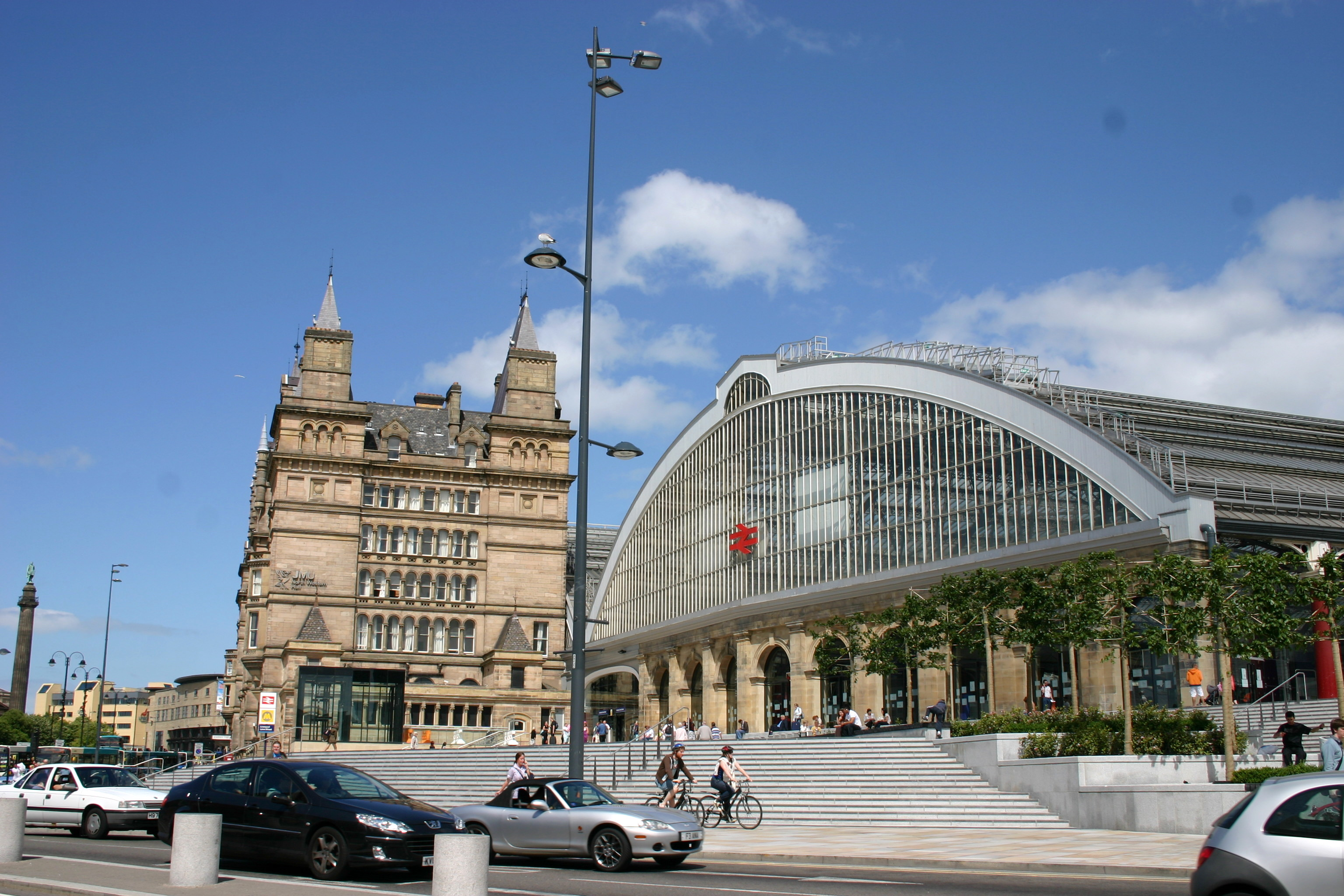
Liverpool Lime Street station

Mainline rail services in Liverpool provide the city with links across England and are centred on Lime Street station in the city centre. The station, which is owned by Network Rail, is served by five train operating companies in addition to services provided by Merseyrail on the local network.

The primary operator for mainline services out of Liverpool is Northern, who provide local links to other towns and cities in the North West including Blackpool, Manchester, Preston, Warrington, and Wigan. Many of these services also call at other stations within the city including Broad Green, Edge Hill, Hunts Cross, Huyton, South Parkway, and Wavertree Technology Park.

The city is linked to London Euston via the West Coast Main Line with services run by Avanti West Coast. One train per hour leaves Lime Street station destined for the capital, with the service increasing to two trains per hour during peak times.

Other rail operators that provide services from Liverpool include West Midlands Trains, TransPennine Express, and East Midlands Railway, who provide links to other major towns and cities in the UK, including but not limited to Birmingham, Leeds, Norwich, Nottingham, Sheffield, and York.

From March 2019, Transport for Wales started to operate an hourly service to Chester via the recently upgraded Halton Curve. This service extends into North Wales terminating at Wrexham General at peak times.

=== Historic tramway and railways ===
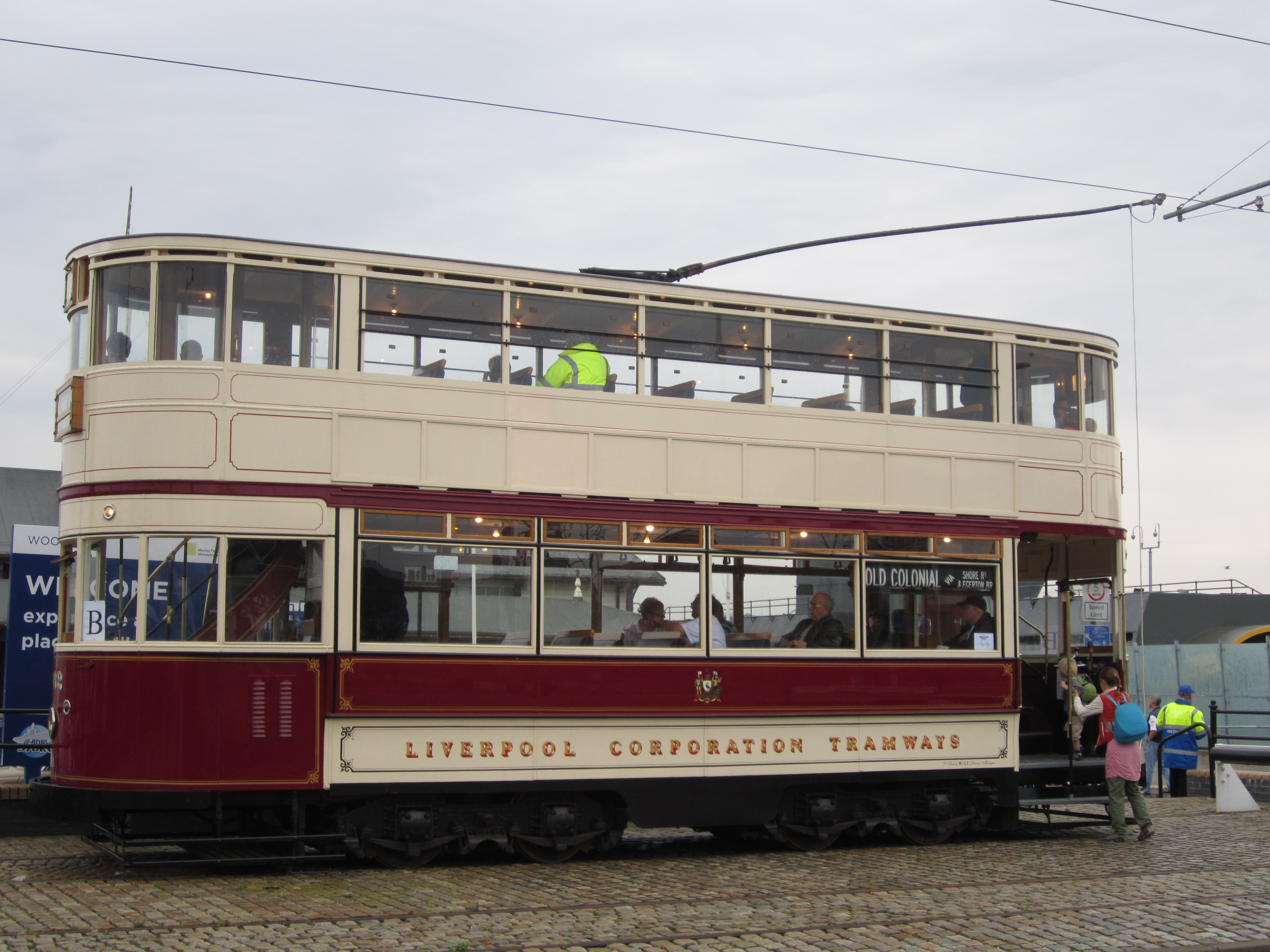
Liverpool Corporation Tram

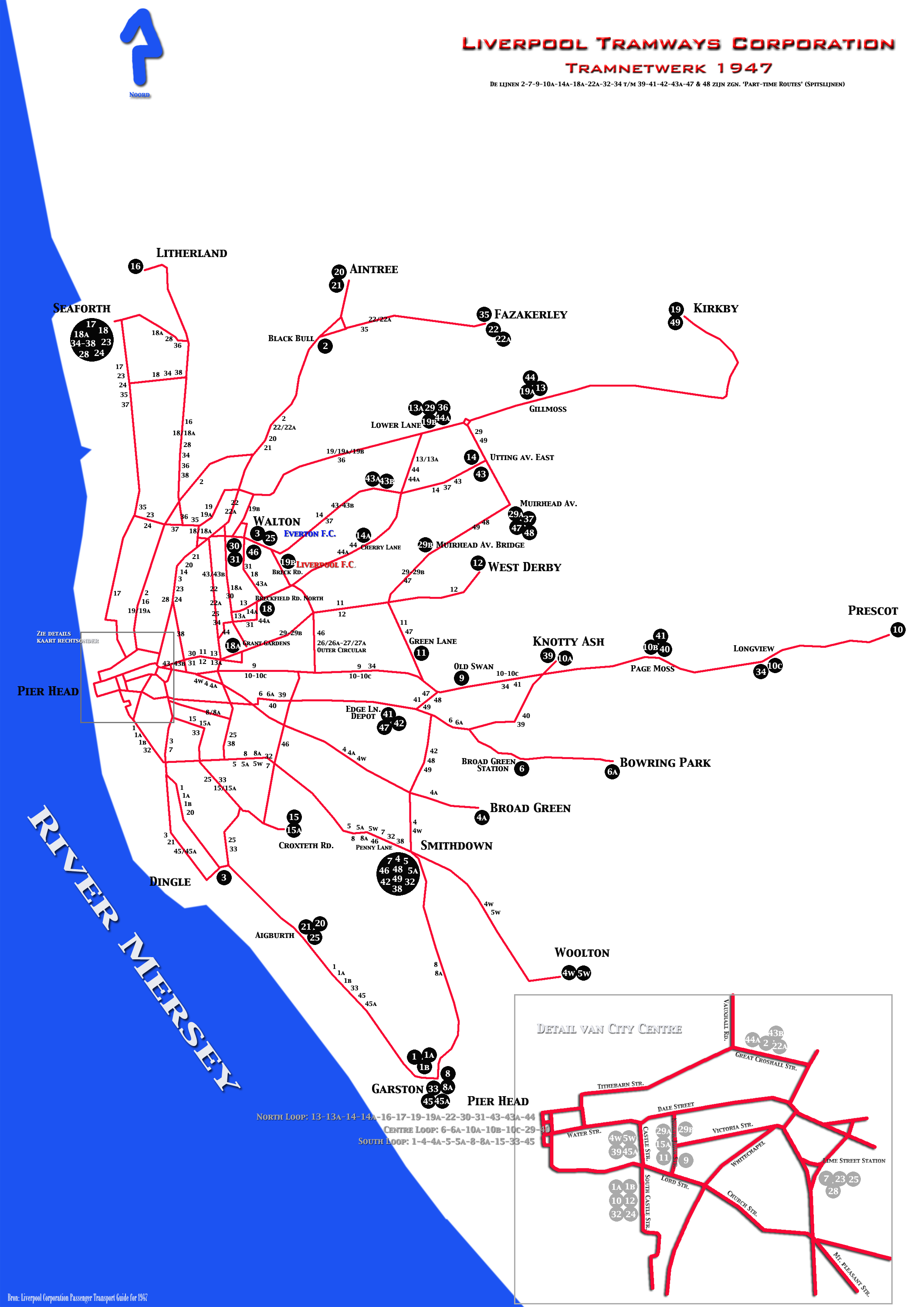
Liverpool Tramway

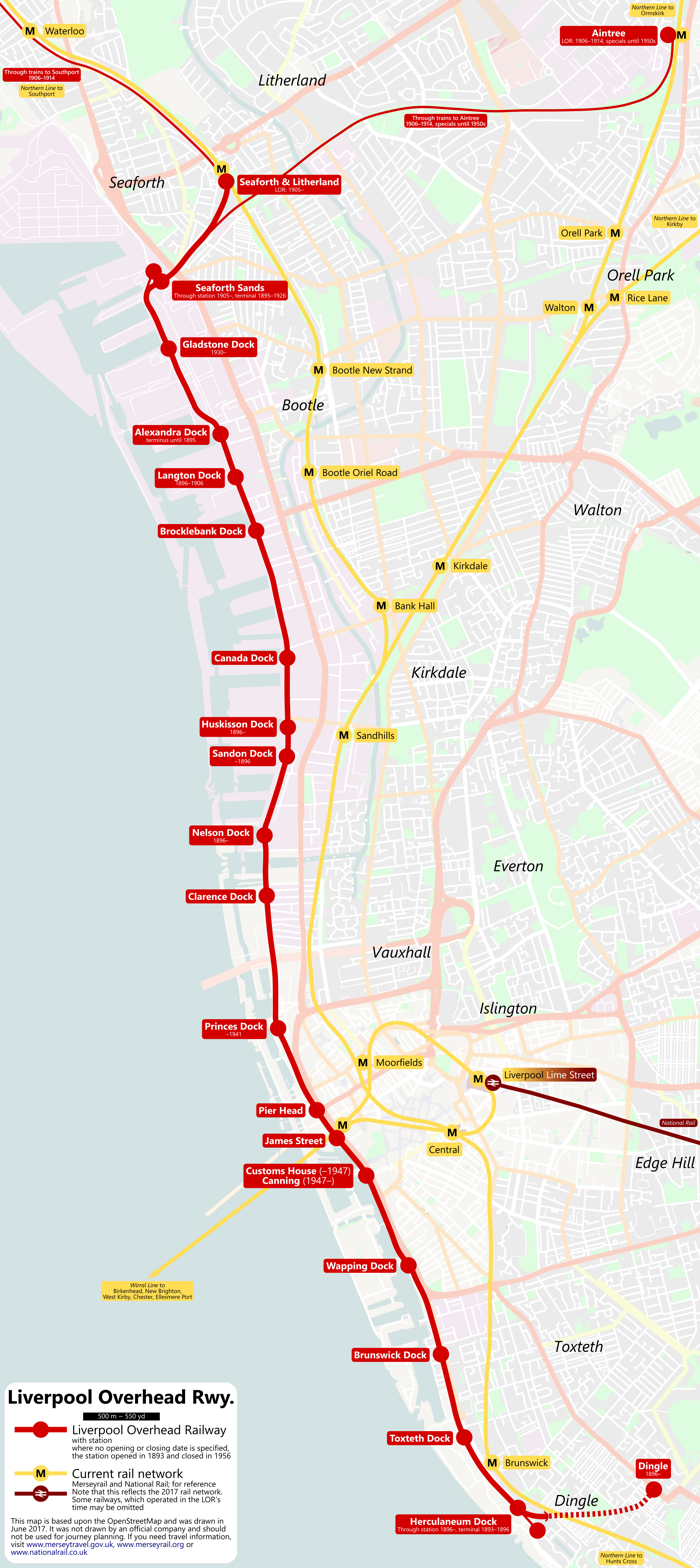
Liverpool Overhead Railway

Historically, Liverpool had an extensive tram network, construction of which started in 1869 by the Liverpool Tramways Company; however, this was dismantled in the 1950s. In 2001, a plan to build new a light rail system, Merseytram was developed. After central government insisted on additional guarantees prior to the release of previously committed funds, it was cancelled in November 2005 and the project finally killed off in 2013.

Other railway lines, such as the Canada Dock Branch from Edge Hill to Kirkdale, no longer see passenger services, or have been removed completely, such as the North Liverpool Extension Line.

Liverpool had been home to the first electrically powered overhead railway in the world. Known as the Liverpool Overhead Railway opening on 4 February 1893 with an eventual total of 14 stations. The line suffered extensive damage during the Second World War and was eventually closed down on 30 December 1956 with considerable protest. The tunnel portal in Dingle and Dingle underground station, are the only large surviving signs of the railway's existence as the iron elevated sections were removed for scrap.

== Airport ==
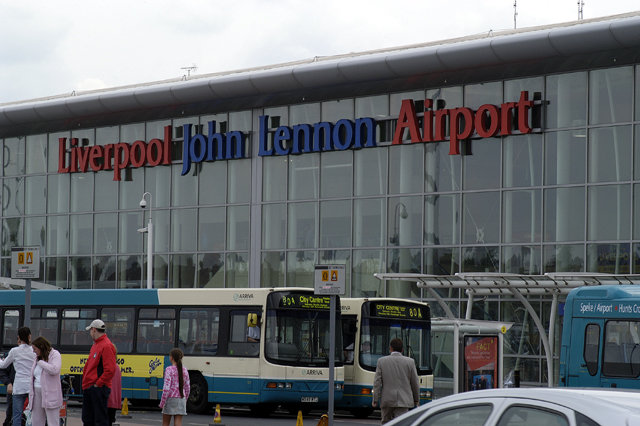
Liverpool John Lennon Airport entrance

Opened in the 1930s, Liverpool Airport, is situated near Speke in the south of the city. It was renamed Liverpool John Lennon Airport in 2001, in honour of musician and founding member of The Beatles, John Lennon. The airport's logo consists of a sketch that John Lennon had drawn of himself, and the words "Above us only sky", lyrics from his song "Imagine". The sensitivity surrounding the airport's name change meant that the logo had to be designed in secret before it could be unveiled by John Lennon's widow Yoko Ono. The old airport was the starting point for Beatles tours in the sixties, and images of the band boarding planes there were seen throughout the world. In 2006 the airport handled nearly 5 million passengers and now serves 64 destinations, including many key European cities. New routes to New York and Toronto in summer 2007 were withdrawn towards the end of the year, as was the route to London City Airport, due to low passenger numbers.

There is a scheduled rail service from Liverpool Lime Street station to Manchester Airport for flights to North America and Asia.

== Water transport ==
Water Transport in Liverpool
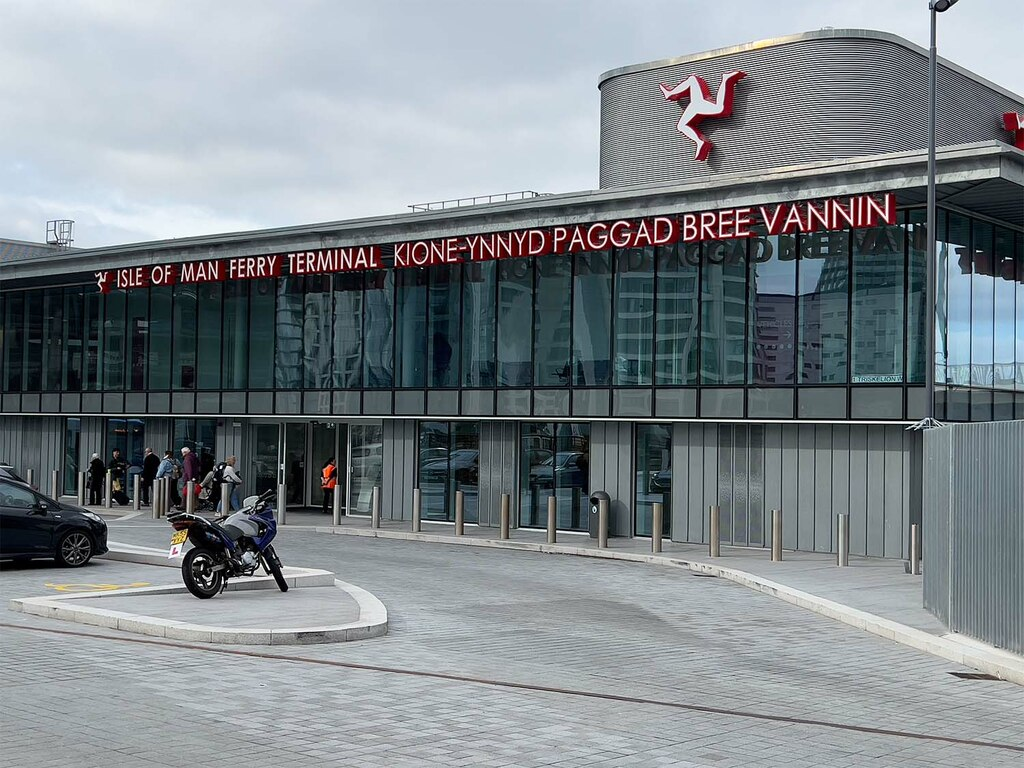
2024 Isle of Man ferry terminal

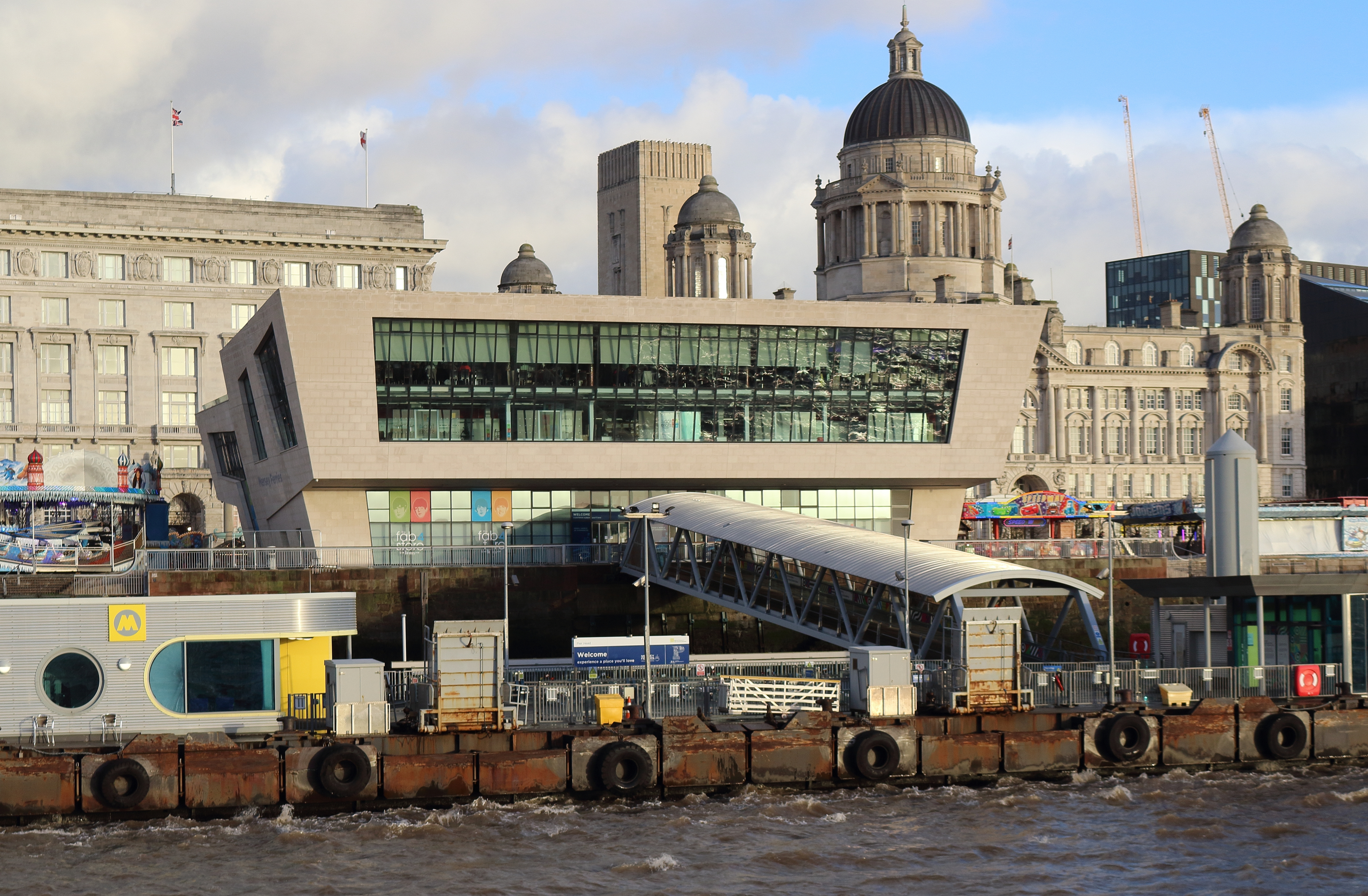
Pier Head Ferry Terminal, Liverpool

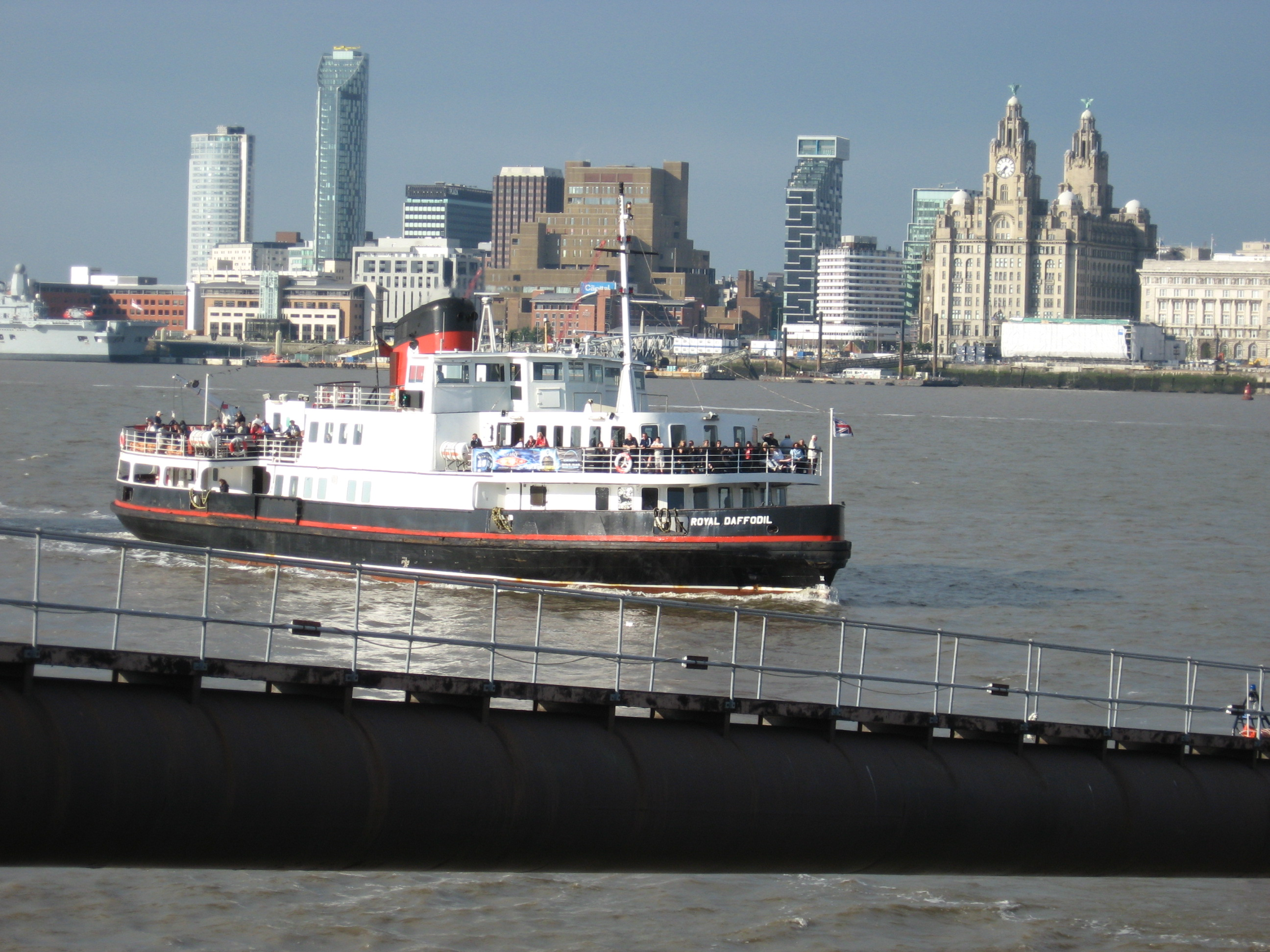
Royal Daffodil Mersey Ferry

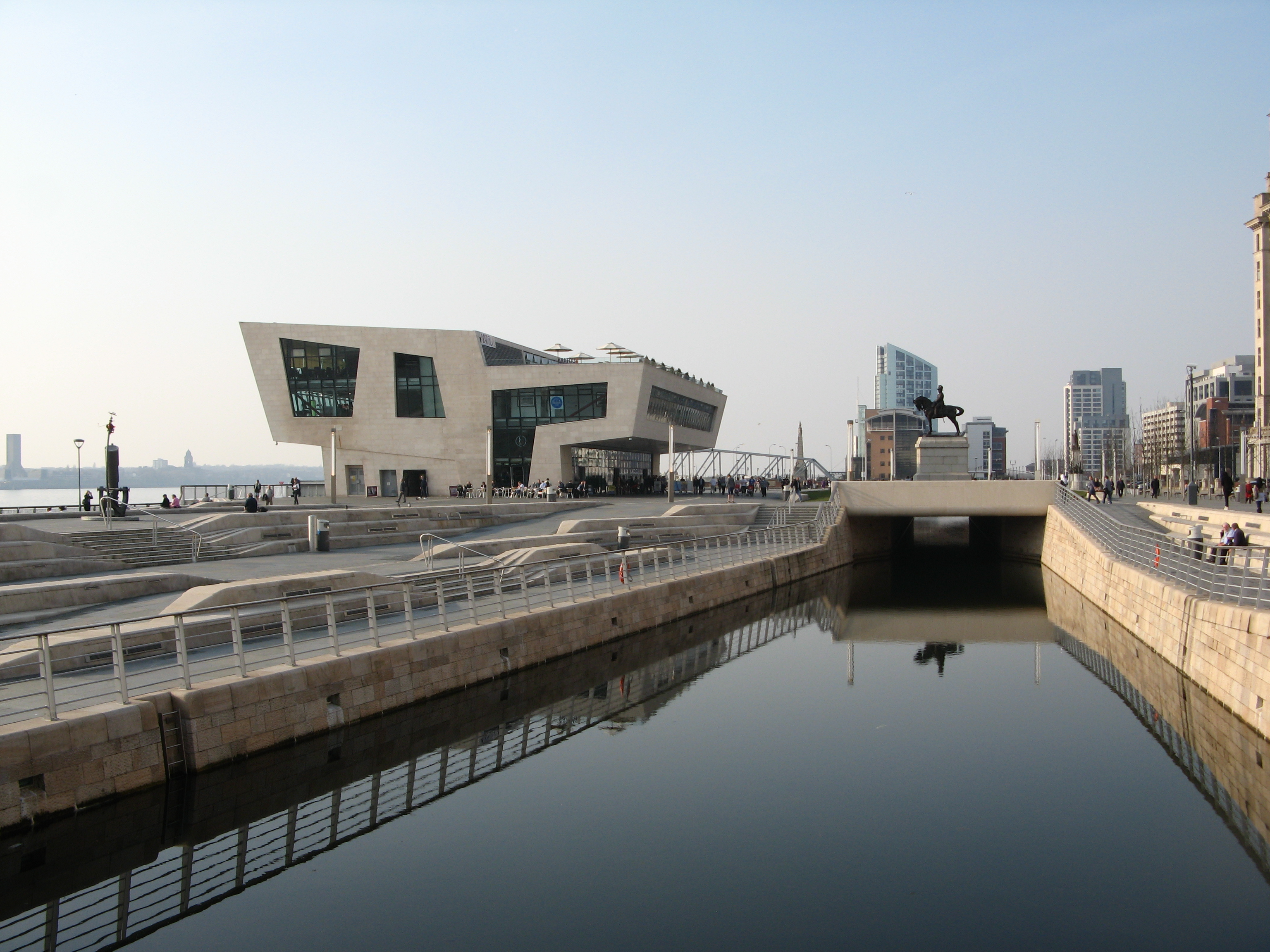
Leeds-Liverpool Canal Liverpool Canal Link

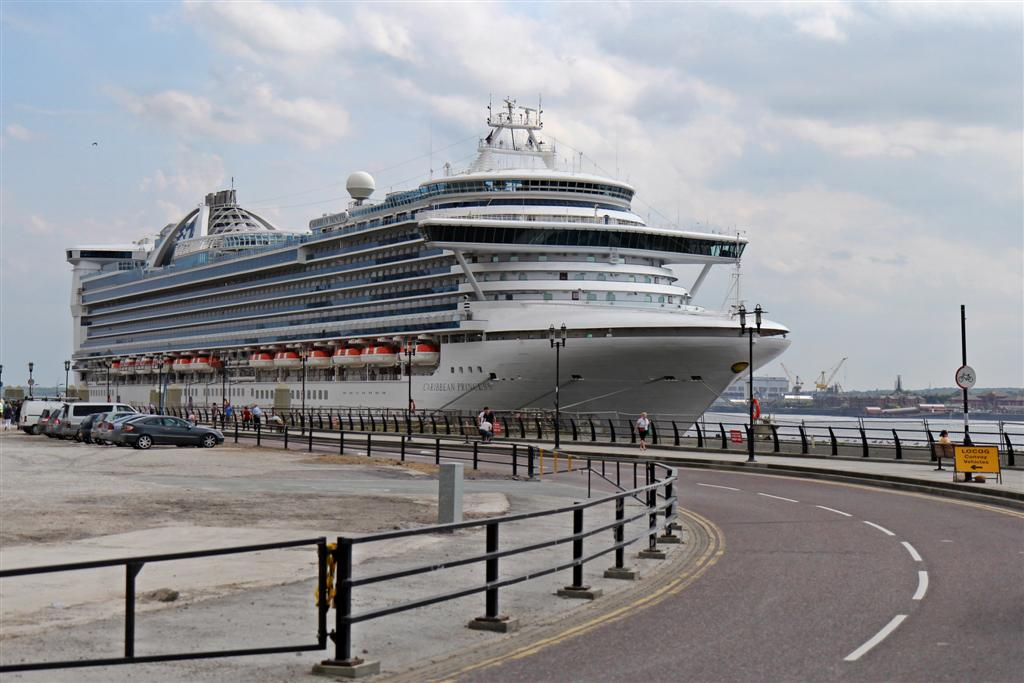
Caribbean Princess at Liverpool Cruise Terminal

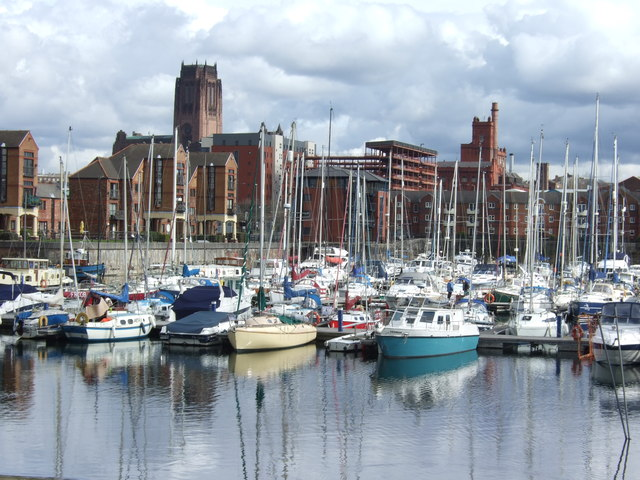
Yachts at Liverpool Marina, Coburg Dock

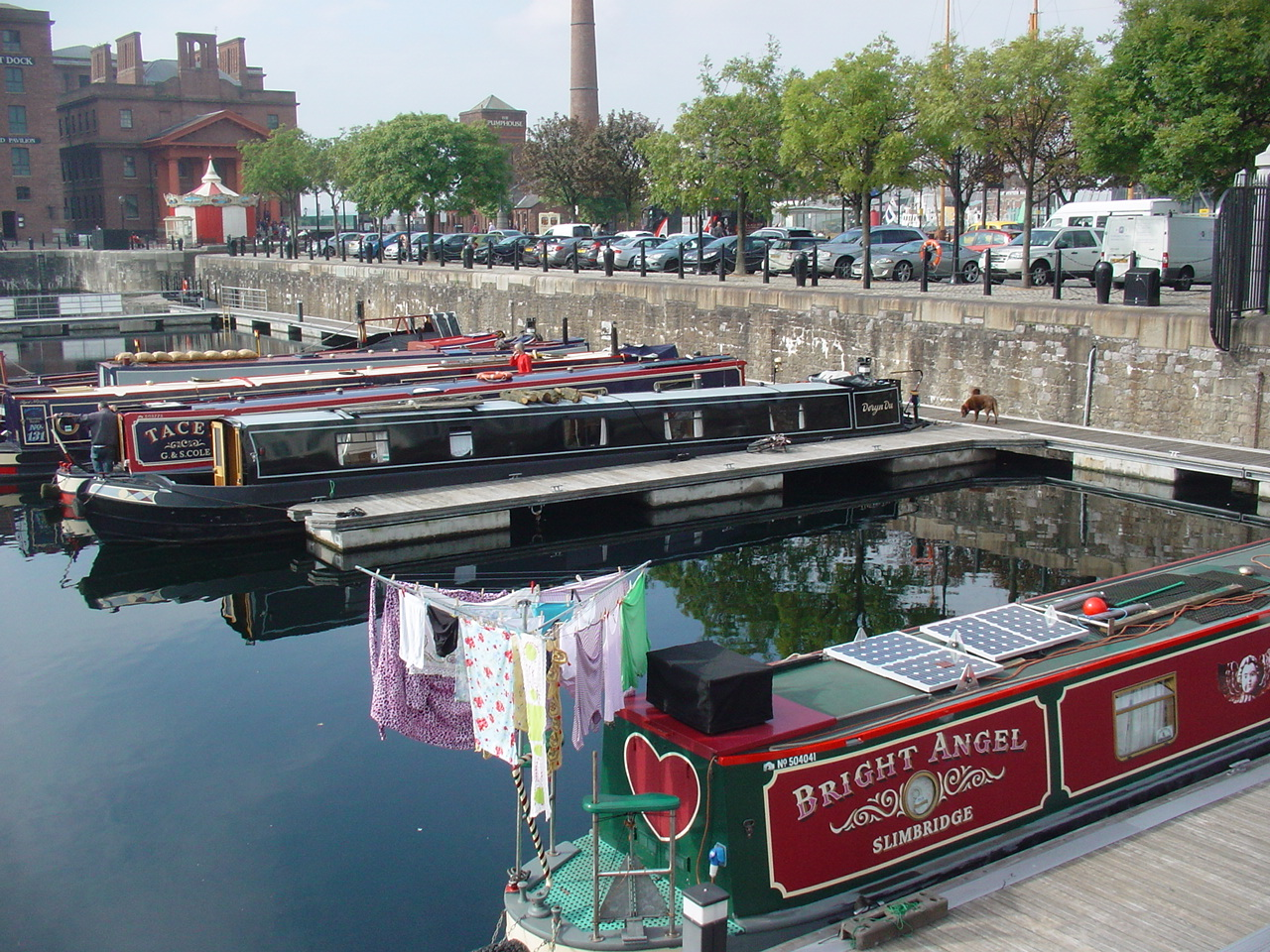
Salthouse Dock narrowboats

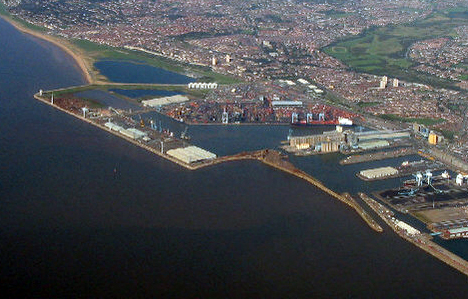
Liverpool2 location, Seaforth Docks

Liverpool's position on the River Mersey, close to the mouth into the Irish Sea, has contributed to its rise as a major port within the United Kingdom. In addition to the Port of Liverpool's role as a major cargo terminal, the port also provides a base for ferry and cruise services.

=== 19th century ===
Trans-Atlantic shipping
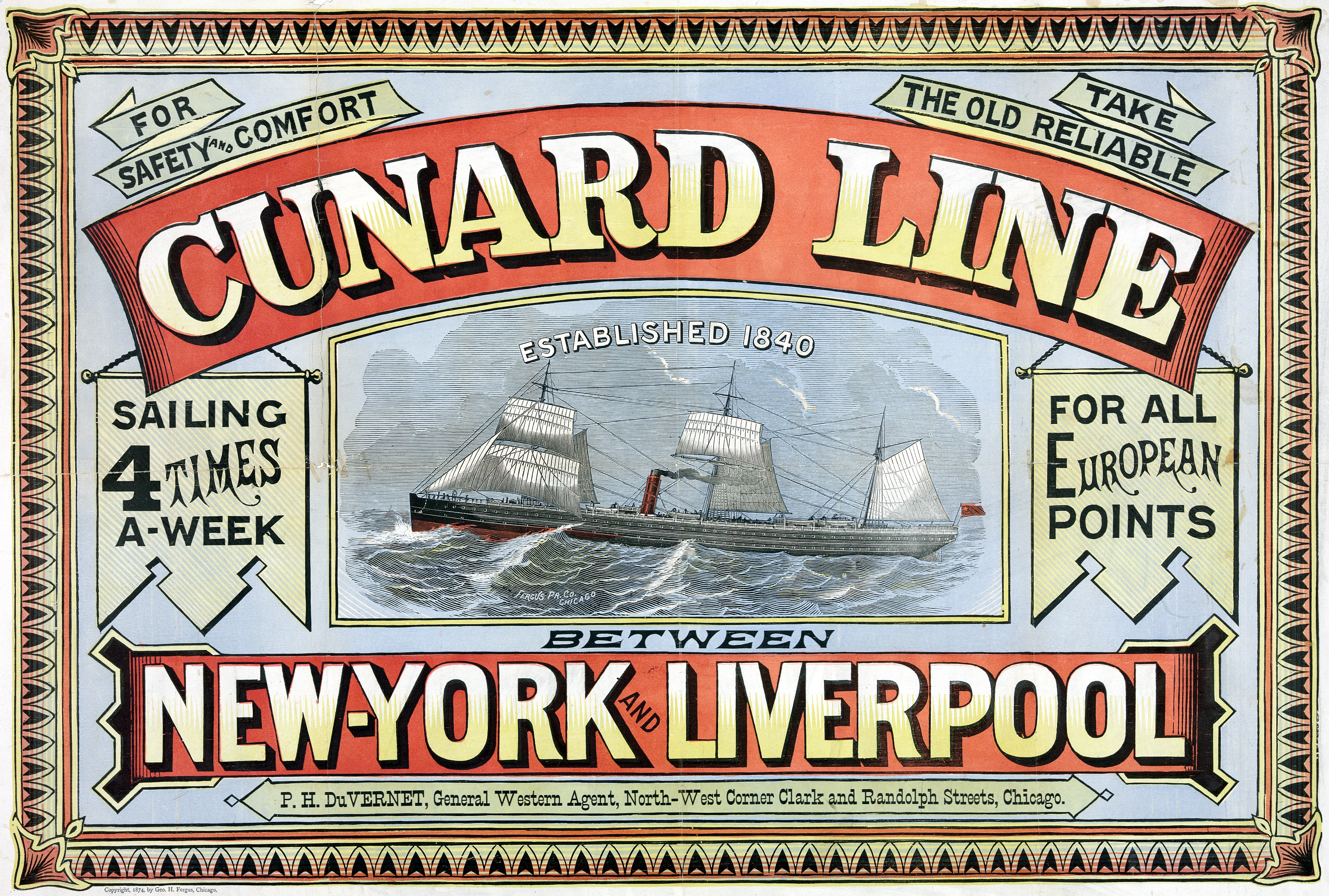
Cunard, 1875

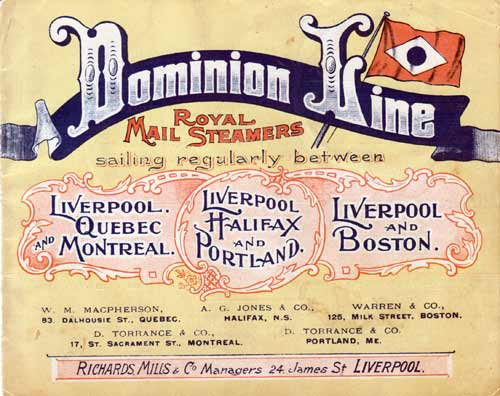
Dominion Line, 1890s

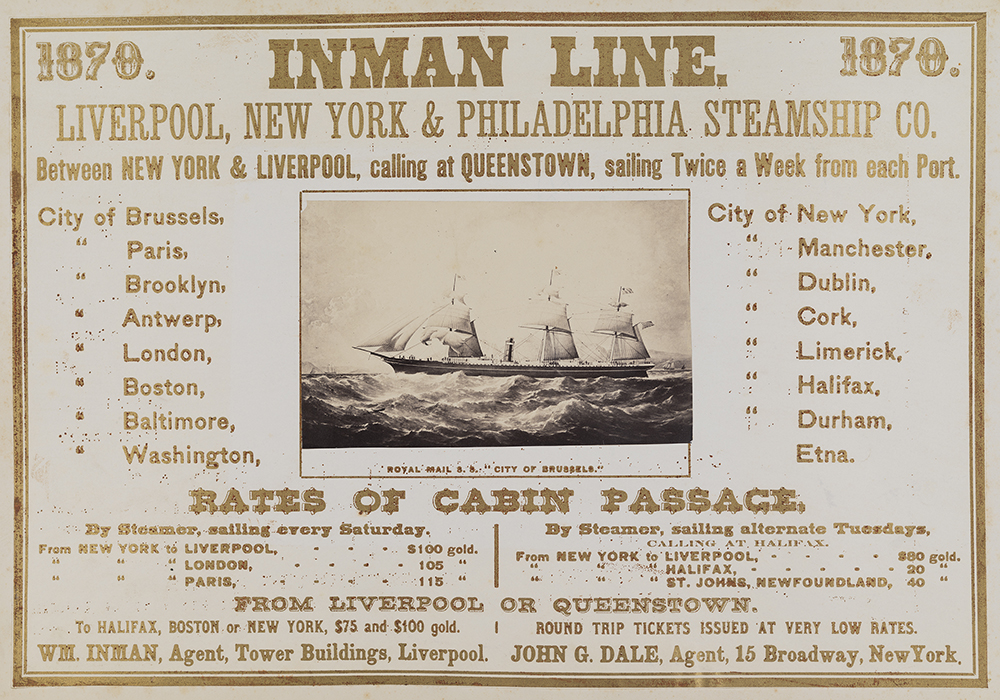
Inman Line, 1870

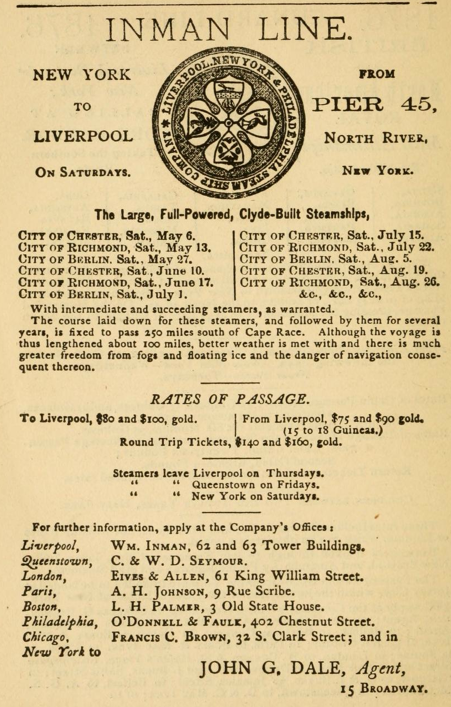
Inman Line, 1876

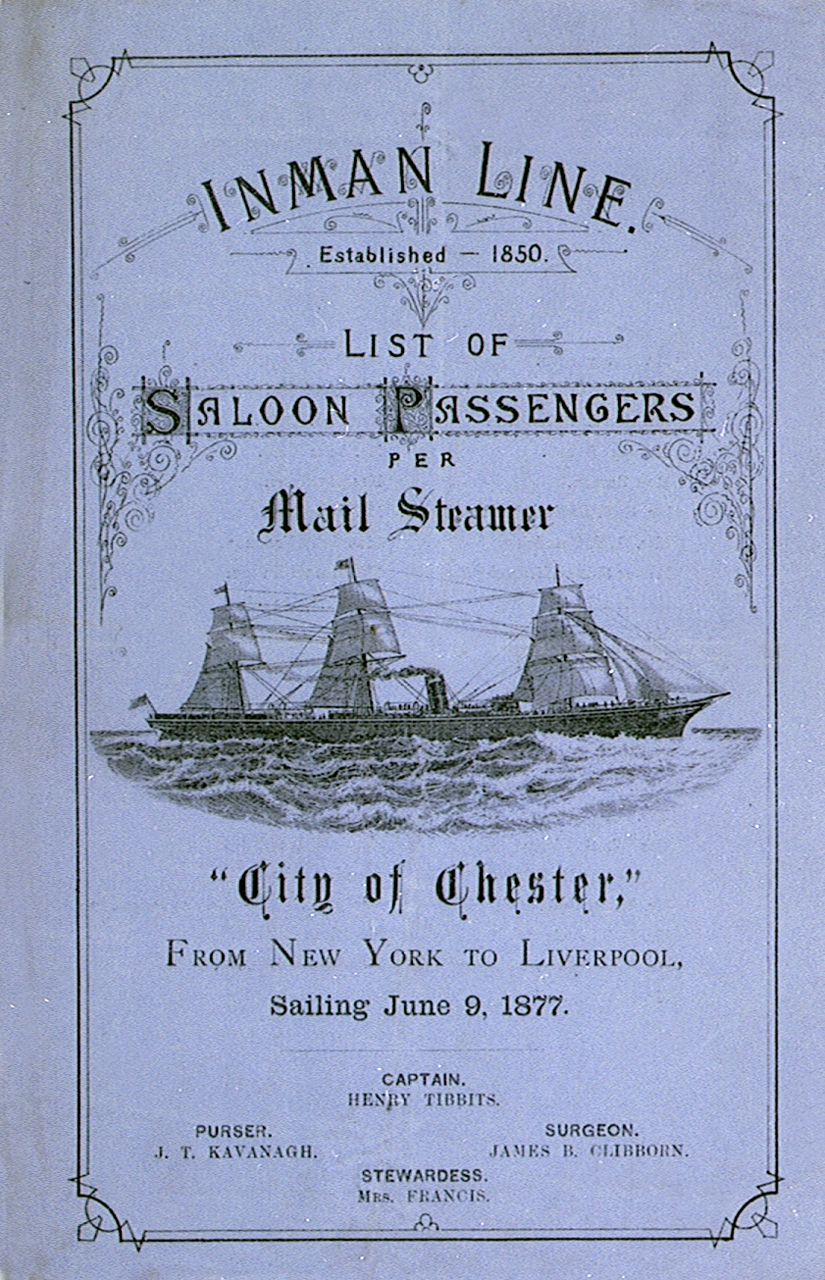
Inman Line, 1877

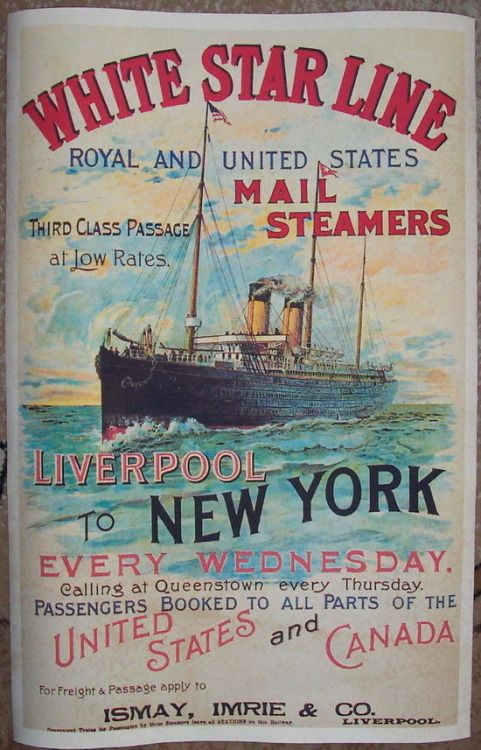
White Star Line

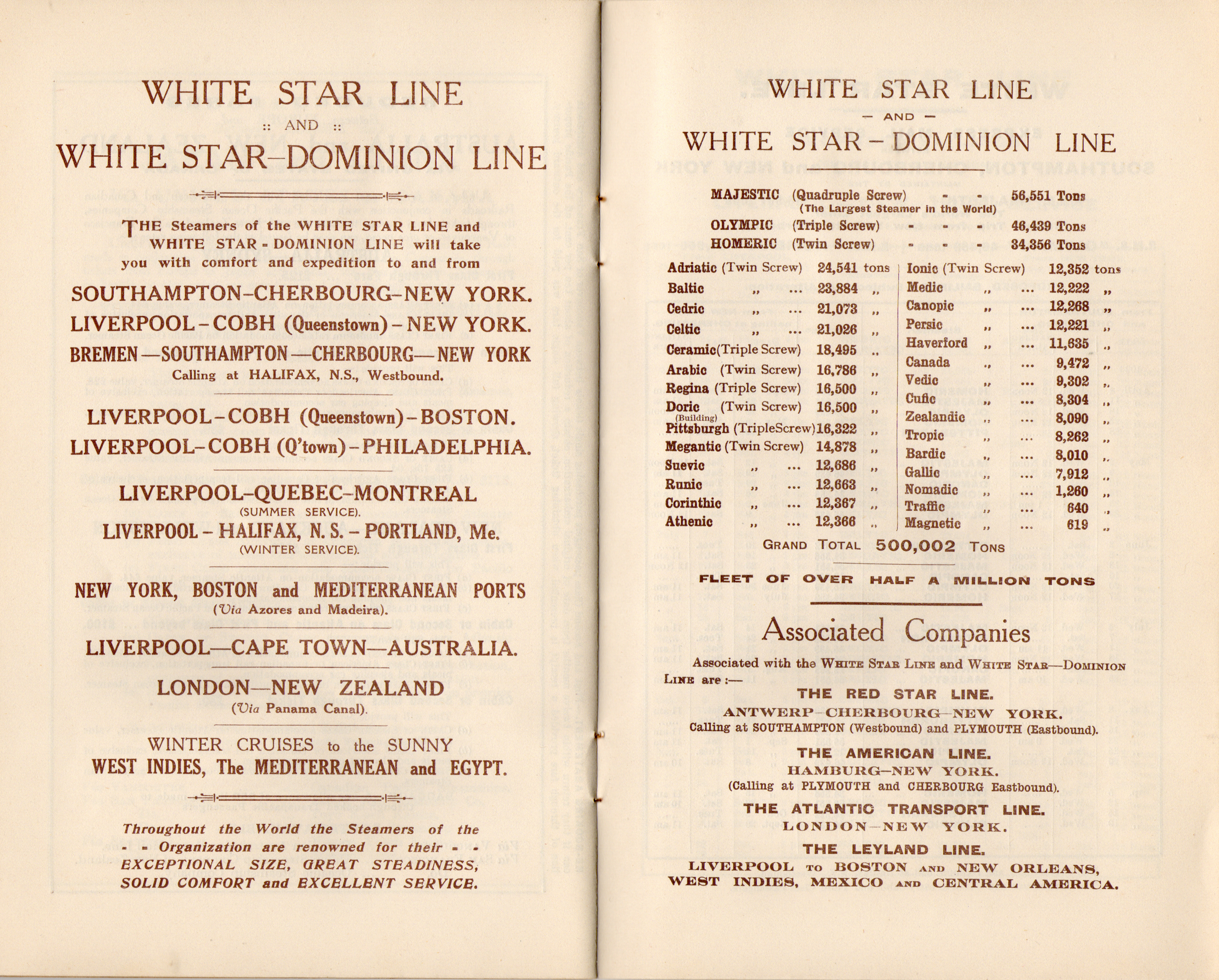
White Star Line and White-Star Dominion Line, routes 1923

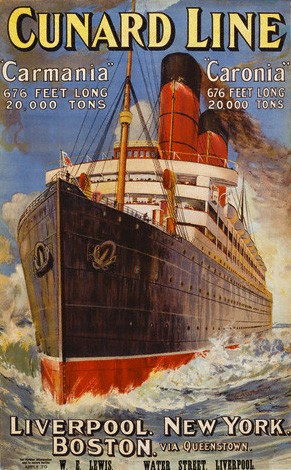
RMS Carmania (1905)

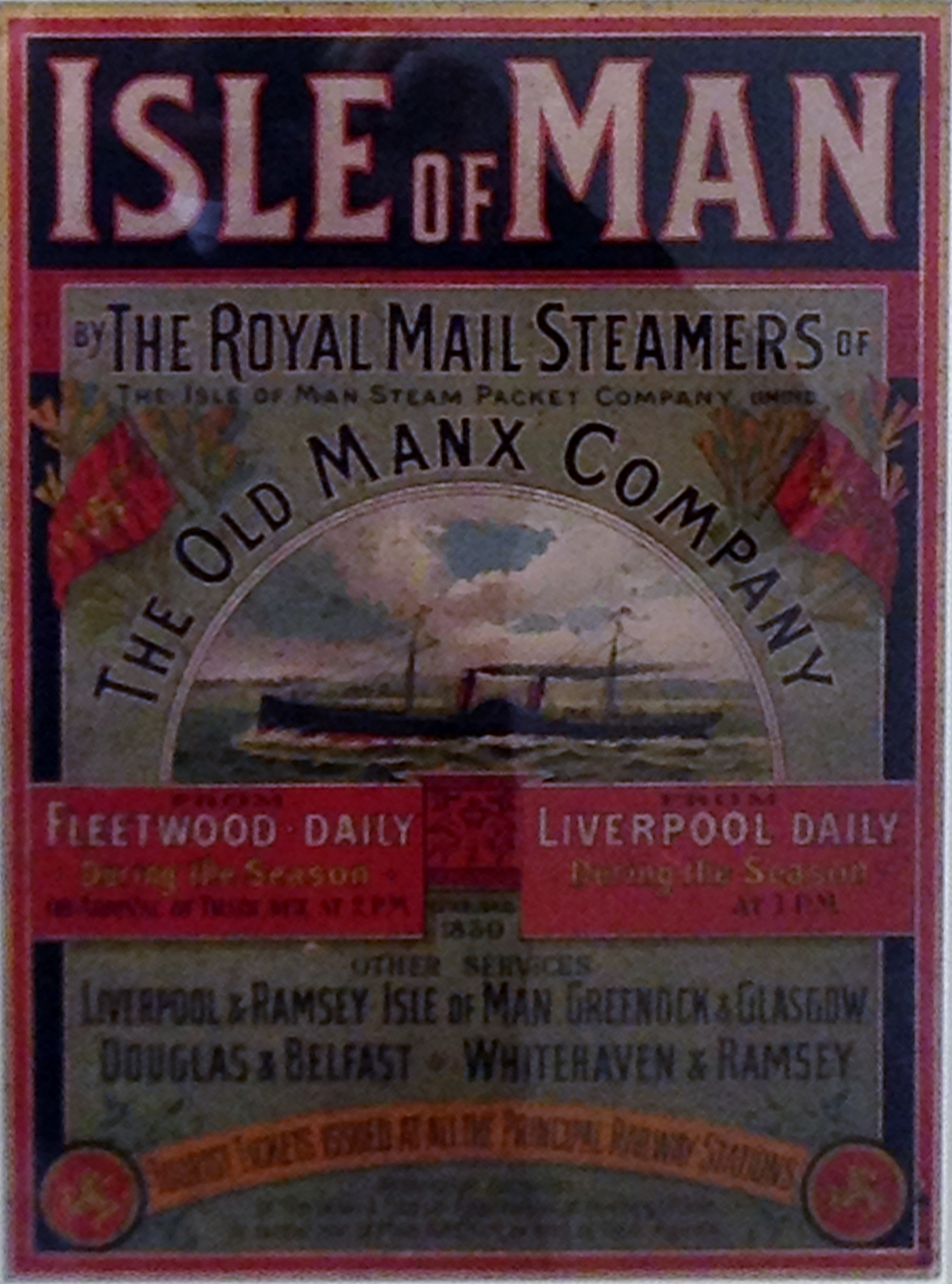
Isle of Man Steam Packet Company

In the 19th Century, transatlantic trade and passenger travel was served to destinations such as New York City from Liverpool by;

==== American companies ====
- Black Ball Line (trans-Atlantic packet) (1817–1877)
- Collins Line (1818–1858)
- Inman Line (1850–1893)
- Guion Line (1866–1894)
- Leyland Line (1873–1901)

==== Liverpool companies ====
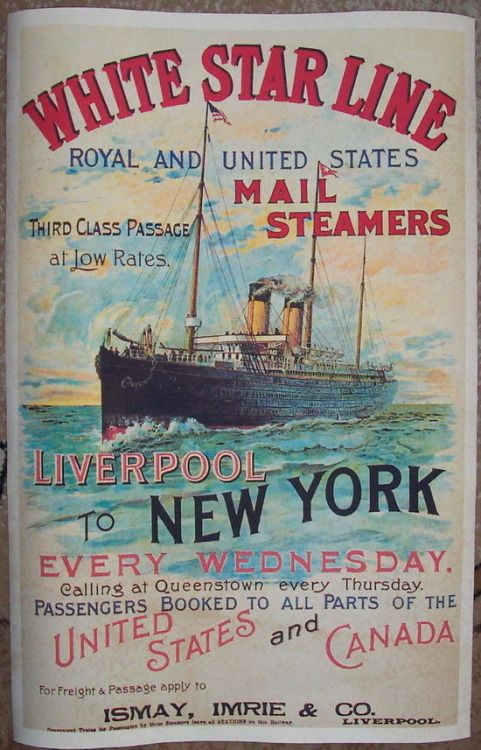
White Star Line Liverpool-New York poster

- Cunard (1840–)
- White Star Line (1845–1934)

In 1972 Canadian Pacific unit CP Ships were the last transatlantic line to operate from Liverpool. Ferries also operated to North Wales from Liverpool by Liverpool and North Wales Steamship Company.

=== Port of Liverpool ===
Isle of Man Steam Packet route map

In 2002, 716,000 passengers used the Port of Liverpool, with the Isle of Man and Ireland being the two most important passenger routes. The goods trade, which was very low after several decades of decline, is growing once again.

Together, the Port of Liverpool and Manchester Ship Canal offer a comprehensive range of port facilities, handling more than 40 million tonnes of cargo and 15,000 ship movements a year – making the River Mersey Britain's third busiest estuary.

The Port and Canal form the "green" gateway to an economy of more than 120,000 industrial and commercial enterprises and a population equal to that of greater London.

The Port of Liverpool and the Manchester Ship Canal are now as one under the banner of Peel Ports, the UK's second largest ports group. 2016 saw the opening of Liverpool2, a £400 million extension to the port that allows two 13,500 TEU post-Panamax vessels simultaneously.

=== Liverpool Cruise Terminal ===
Liverpool Cruise Terminal in the city centre provides long distance passenger cruises, Fred. Olsen Cruise Lines MS Black Watch and Cruise & Maritime Voyages MS Magellan using the terminal to depart to Iceland, France, Spain and Norway.

=== Mersey crossings ===
There are three tunnels under the River Mersey: the Mersey Railway Tunnel; and two road tunnels, Queensway Tunnel and Kingsway Tunnel.

The Mersey Ferry continues to provide an important link between Liverpool and the Wirral, as well as a tourist attraction. Made famous by the song "Ferry Cross the Mersey" by Gerry & The Pacemakers, the song is now played on the ferryboats themselves every time they prepare to dock at Liverpool after a tourist cruise.

The Mersey is crossed upstream from Liverpool at Runcorn and Widnes, by the Mersey Gateway and the Silver Jubilee Bridge (usually known simply as the "Runcorn Bridge") and the Runcorn Railway Bridge.

=== Leeds and Liverpool Canal ===
Built between 1770 and 1816, the Leeds and Liverpool Canal links Liverpool and the Mersey to Leeds and the River Aire. Its original terminus had been at Old Hall Street, Pall Mall, Chisenhale Street, but was cut back to Eldonian Village in the 1960s. In 2009, work was completed on the Liverpool Canal Link, a £22 million, 1.5-mile extension that links the canal to the Albert Dock.

=== Irish Sea ===
Isle of Man Steam Packet Company operate HSC Manannan to Douglas, Isle of Man from Liverpool during summertime.

== Proposals ==
Liverpool was the third least car dependent city in the Campaign for Better Transport's car dependency report.

=== New railway stations & ferries ===
Liverpool City Region Combined Authority announced in August 2019 that they were planning on using £172m of funding on several major transport projects. These included:

- A new railway station at Headbolt Lane, Kirkby
- Reopening St James railway station, Liverpool
- Purchasing two low carbon Mersey ferries to replace the current aging fleet

== See also ==
- Transport in Liverpool city centre
- Transport in Manchester
