= Metro (Liverpool City Region) =

Franchised bus network in Merseyside and Cheshire, England

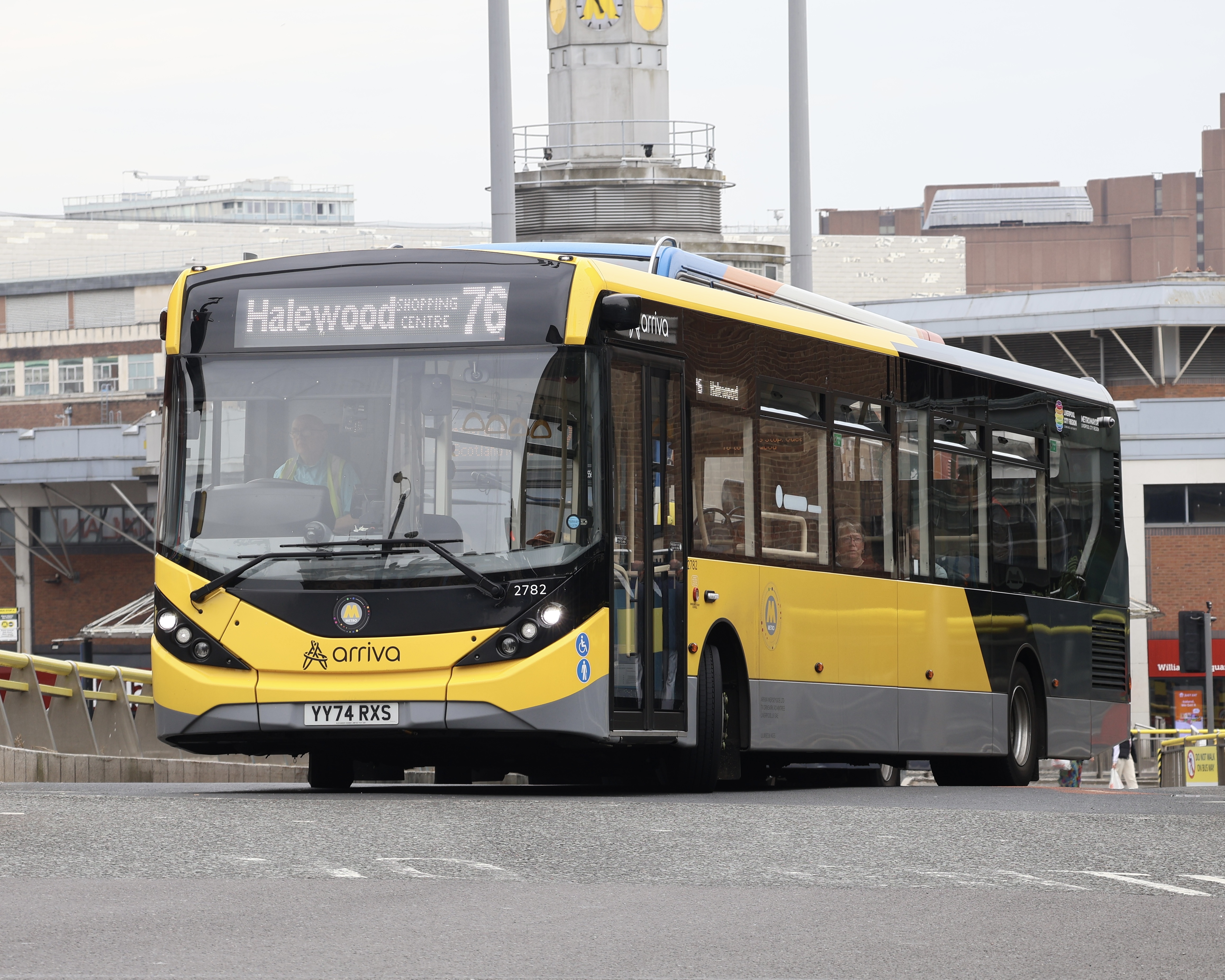
- Alexander Dennis Enviro200 MMC operated by Arriva North West at Queen Square bus station in June 2025

Overview
- Owner: Merseytravel
- Area served: Liverpool City Region: Liverpool; Knowsley; St Helens; Sefton; Wirral; Halton
- Transit type: Bus transport

Operation
- Began operation: 6 September 2026; 2 months ago

Metro is a network of franchised bus services in the Liverpool City Region, England, created under the bus franchising provisions of the Bus Services Act 2017. First announced in October 2023 by Liverpool City Region Combined Authority (LRCRA) Metro Mayor Steve Rotheram, the network commenced operations in September 2026, starting in St Helens. It is planned to extend across the combined authority area.

== History ==
=== Deregulation ===
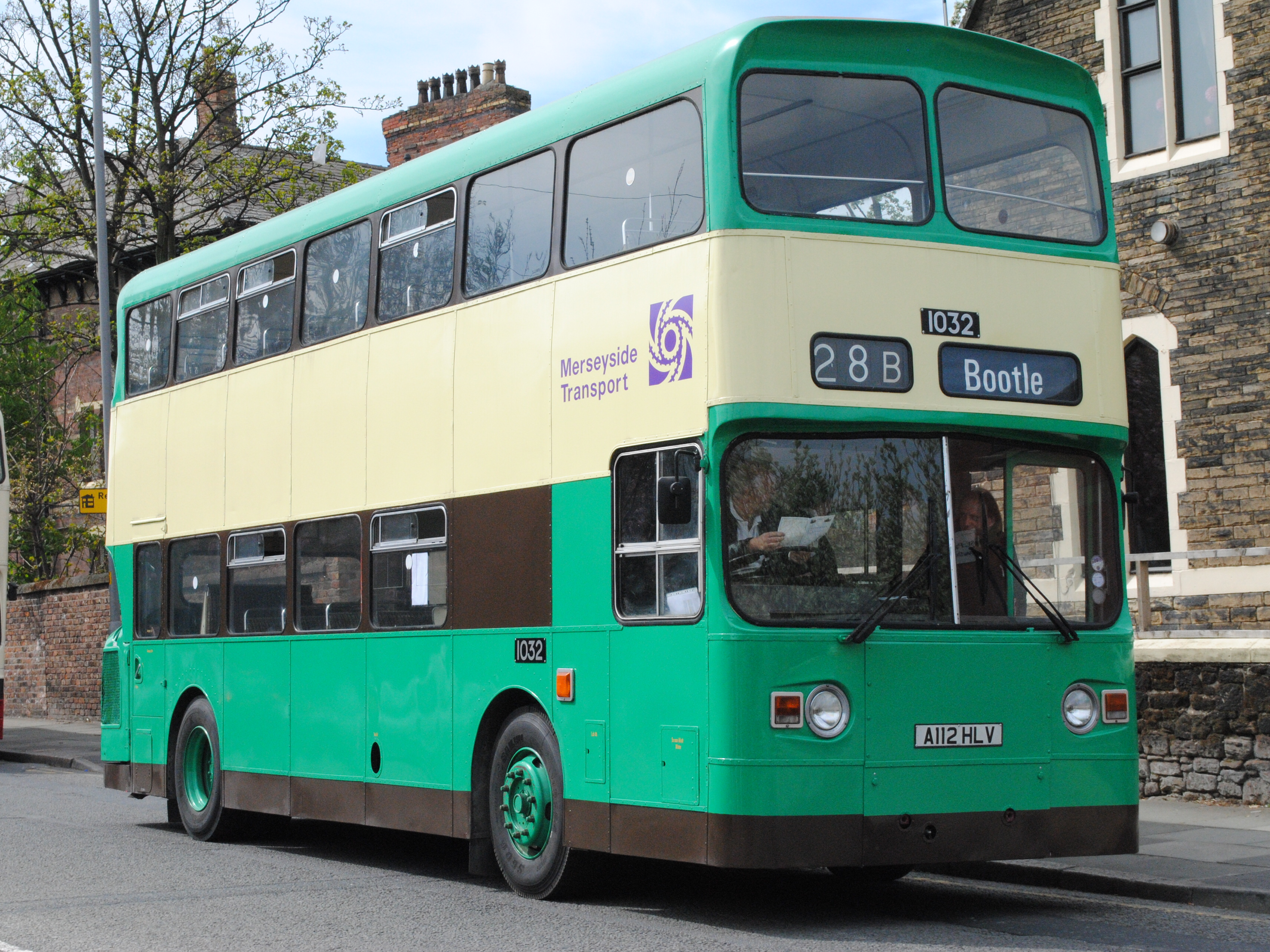
Preserved Merseyside Transport Alexander bodied Leyland Atlantean in Bootle in May 2013

Prior to the creation of the metropolitan county of Merseyside on 1 April 1974, the Merseyside Passenger Transport Executive was formed on 1 November 1970 to run the bus and rail services of the new county. Bus services provided by municipally-owned operators in Liverpool, Birkenhead, Wallasey, St Helens and Southport were brought under the Merseyside Transport name, with some bus services also operated in co-operation with state-owned National Bus Company subsidiaries Crosville and Ribble.

The Transport Act 1985 ordered the deregulation of bus services across Great Britain, as well as the break-up of the six passenger transport executives and the National Bus Company, all of which began taking effect from 26 October 1986. Merseyside PTE's bus operations were spun off into an 'arm's length' company named Merseybus, which was eventually sold into privatisation by the PTE's successor Merseytravel to Merseybus employees and management in a £5.9 million (equivalent to £13,019,000 in 2025) Employee Share Ownership Plan in December 1992, forming MTL Trust Holdings Limited.

As an immediate consequence of deregulation, however, Merseyside's bus passengers faced reduced services and fare increases ranging from between 55% and 150%. 'Bus wars' in and around Merseyside were not uncommon in the years immediately after deregulation, with particularly heavy competition seen between Merseybus and fellow former municipal GM Buses on Liverpool to Manchester bus services. As of September 2024, the two largest bus operators within the boundaries of the Liverpool City Region are Arriva North West, who purchased MTL Trust Holdings in 2000, and Stagecoach Merseyside and South Lancashire, who purchased Gillmoss-based Glenvale Transport in 2005. A small number of independently owned bus operators, such as Aintree Coachline and Peoplesbus, also operate some Merseytravel contract services within the region.

=== Public consultations ===
The Bus Services Act 2017 granted combined authorities such as the Liverpool City Region the ability to partially re-regulate their local bus services, permitting them to franchise services to commercial bus operators in a similar system to those operated by Transport for London. In November 2021, LCRA Metro Mayor Steve Rotheram announced that a £667 million ten-point Bus Service Improvement Plan (BSIP), which included securing 'flexible funding to support set up costs for the region's preferred option of franchising or enhanced partnership', had been submitted to the central government.

In March 2022, it was announced that members of the LCRCA had voted in favour of introducing bus franchising across the Liverpool City Region. A public consultation, titled 'Moving Buses Forward', was then launched by the LCRCA in July 2023 to determine whether local bus users preferred franchising or an enhanced partnership network. Following this consultation, as well as an audit into the scheme's viability, Metro Mayor Steve Rotheram announced that the Liverpool City Region's buses would be franchised starting in 2026.

== Franchising process ==
The district boundaries of the Liverpool City Region that Metro bus services will operate within

The aim of Metro bus network is for it to operate alongside the Merseyrail commuter rail network to create a London-style transport system similar to that of the Bee Network in Greater Manchester. The franchising rollout began in January 2026 with the announcement of tendered operators for the local authority districts of St Helens and Wirral, which will be brought under Metro control from October 2026, and services in the districts of Knowsley, Liverpool and Sefton following at an unspecified date.

Metro bus services are to be split into 'Category 1' and 'Category 2' franchises and tendered to operators for a minimum of five years, with options for the tender to be extended for an additional two years:

- Category 1 franchises, split between the five districts of the Liverpool City Region, are responsible for the vast majority of regional public bus services and require between 86 and 206 buses to run, with depots and buses being supplied by the LCRCA. A single operator cannot operate more than one Category 1 franchise, preventing them from dominating the process and also creating competition for future franchising rounds.
- Category 2 franchises, intended for small or medium-sized bus operators, are responsible for home-to-school bus services as well as some local public bus contracts across the whole region, with winning bidders to be made to supply both their own depots and a fleet of between six and 22 buses.

Large operators who win Category 1 franchises will be barred from gaining Category 2 franchises as an 'add-on'. In the event of the failure of 'voluntary negotiations' between existing operators and the LCRCA, the LCRCA has a contingency plan to potentially issue compulsory purchase orders for large bus depots within the region. Plans for the franchised network to extend into the Borough of Halton in Cheshire were provisionally dropped by the LCRCA amid negotiations between the authority and Halton Borough Council, while the LCRCA is negotiating with bus operators and neighbouring local authorities about franchising long-distance services running beyond the Liverpool City Region's boundaries, such as Stagecoach Merseyside and South Lancashire's commercial X1 to Chester.

On 23 January 2026, the LCRCA announced that Stagecoach Merseyside and South Lancashire and Go North West, the latter being a Go-Ahead Group operator running franchised Bee Network services in Greater Manchester, had won the Category 1 franchises for the St Helens and the Wirral respectively, taking over the operations of dominant regional operator Arriva North West in these metropolitan boroughs from October 2026. This was followed on 2 April 2026 with the awarding of Category 2 franchises, serving 94 schools and colleges in the Liverpool City Region, to Tower Transit owned Huyton Travel, while service 322, running across the border between Warrington and Ashton-in-Makerfield via Haydock, was awarded to municipal company Warrington's Own Buses.

=== New services ===
In February 2025, as well as pledging that bus franchising will commence a year earlier than first planned during 2026, Steve Rotherham announced the introduction of an express Metro bus service between St Helens and Liverpool John Lennon Airport. A £119 million investment plan for the Metro network, including new buses, depot and infrastructure upgrades, is to be considered during meetings of the LCRCA in March 2025.

£1.6 billion in funding was secured the following June from a nationwide £15 million transport fund provided by Chancellor of the Exchequer Rachel Reeves for both the Liverpool John Lennon Airport express route and for a bus rapid transit (BRT) system, similar in nature to Translink of Northern Ireland's Glider network in Belfast, running on dedicated guided bus lanes between Liverpool F.C.'s Anfield Stadium and Everton F.C.'s Hill Dickinson Stadium at Bramley-Moore Dock. A Van Hool ExquiCity 18 metres (59 ft)-long articulated bus was loaned by Translink to the LCRCA to demonstrate the Glider concept in August 2024, with an Irizar ie tram of the same length loaned to the LCRCA by the manufacturer following in July 2025. The LCRCA intends for Metro to have a Glider-like BRT system fully operational by 2028.

=== MetroCard ===
The LCRCA announced in December 2023 that a 'tap and go' MetroCard contactless ticket system, similar to Transport for London's Oyster card, would start to replace paper tickets and smartcards on Merseyrail services from autumn 2024 in a two-stage rollout. The system, which currently makes use of a physical MetroCard to buy and use tickets, is planned to be extended to both the franchised bus network and the Mersey Ferry in the future; 'tap and go' MetroCard payments are planned to be payable through bank cards or a mobile app on smartphones and smartwatches.

=== Vehicles ===
Stagecoach Merseyside and South Lancashire Metro branded Wright StreetDeck Ultroliner at Wigan North Western station in September 2026

Metro buses are to be painted in a livery of yellow, grey and black with prominent 'Metro' fleetnames. £26.1 million of City Region Sustainable Transport Settlement funding was announced to have been set aside for the purchase of up to 100 battery electric double decker buses for use on Metro services in September 2024. This was followed with the first of 46 Alexander Dennis Enviro200 MMCs, branded in Metro livery, entering service with Arriva North West ahead of the first round of franchising in December 2024.

In February 2025, the LCRCA announced that an order had been placed for 58 Alexander Dennis Enviro400EV battery electric double-deckers, ordered separately from the Sustainable Transport Settlement fund, and by September 2025, 108 electric buses had been ordered by the LCRCA. Further deliveries made prior to the launch of the first franchises on 6 September included 109 Alexander Dennis Enviro200 MMCs and 50 Wright StreetDeck Electroliners, with further deliveries of Alexander Dennis Enviro400 MMCs, Enviro200 MMCs and Enviro100EVs and 144 more Wrightbus buses due to be delivered for the later franchises.

Prior to franchising, the LCRCA took delivery of 20 Metro specification and 'publicly owned' Alexander Dennis Enviro400FCEV fuel cell buses in November 2022, which were to be operated on contract from the LCRCA by both Stagecoach Merseyside and South Lancashire and Arriva North West on service 10A between Liverpool, Knowsley and St Helens. The first of these buses began entering service with Arriva in May 2023, however issues with the supply of green hydrogen fuel meant that between 2023 and early 2024, the bus fleet remained mostly out of service, and despite some briefly re-entering service after both the finding of a stable supply of green hydrogen and a battery refit in mid-2024, it was announced in December 2025 that the buses were to be converted to battery electric power.

== See also ==
- Transport in Liverpool
- Bee Network - Metro's equivalent in Greater Manchester
- The People's Network - Metro's equivalent in South Yorkshire
- Weaver Network - Metro's equivalent in West Yorkshire
