= Queen Square bus station =

Bus station in Liverpool, England

Queen Square

General information
- Location: Queen Square, Liverpool
- Coordinates: 53.4075°N 2.9831°W
- Operator: Merseytravel
- Bus stands: 13
- Bus operators: Arriva North West, Cumfybus, Stagecoach Merseyside & South Lancashire
- Connections: Liverpool Lime Street railway station (300 metres)

Passengers
- Not known
Location

Queen Square bus station serves the city of Liverpool, Merseyside, England. The bus station is owned and managed by Merseytravel.

It is situated adjacent to Queen Square in the city centre and is approximately 300 metres away from the Lime Street railway station.

There are 13 bus stands and a travel centre at the bus station. Buses from the bus station run around the city and go as far as Bootle, Kirkby, Preston, Runcorn, St Helens and Widnes. Most of Liverpool's night buses start from the bus station.

Companies such as Arriva North West, Stagecoach Merseyside & South Lancashire and HTL Buses operate services from this station.
