= Arriva North West =

Bus operator in North West England

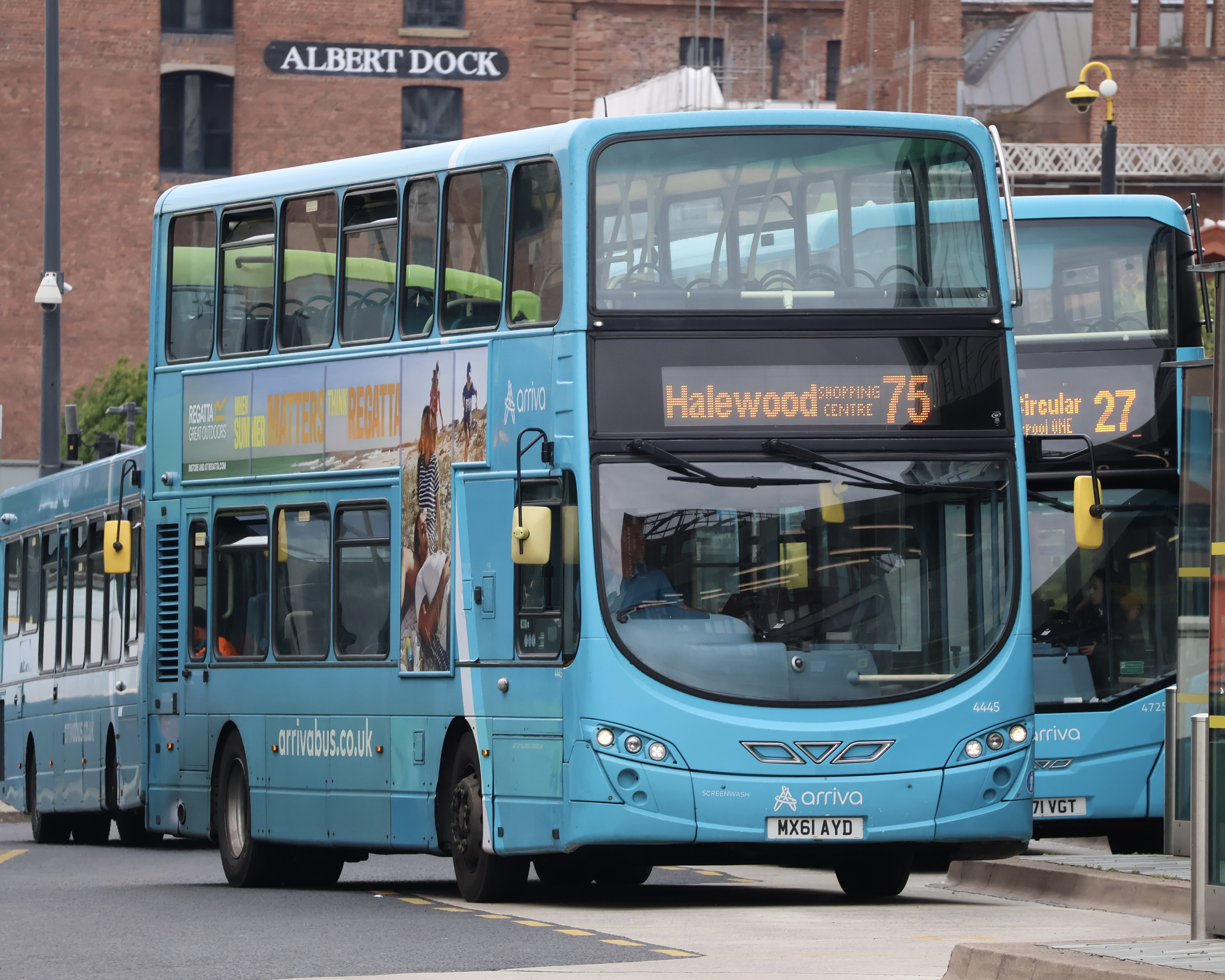
- Wright Gemini 2 bodied VDL DB300 in Liverpool One bus station in June 2025
- Parent: Arriva UK Bus
- Founded: 2009; 17 years ago
- Headquarters: Aintree, Merseyside, England
- Locale: North West England
- Service area: Merseyside; Cheshire; Lancashire
- Service type: Bus services
- Hubs: Wigan; Liverpool; Runcorn; St Helens; Southport; Widnes
- Fleet: 605 (November 2023)
- Website: Official website

Arriva North West is a major bus operator running services in North West England in the Merseyside area. It is a subsidiary of Arriva UK Bus.

== History ==
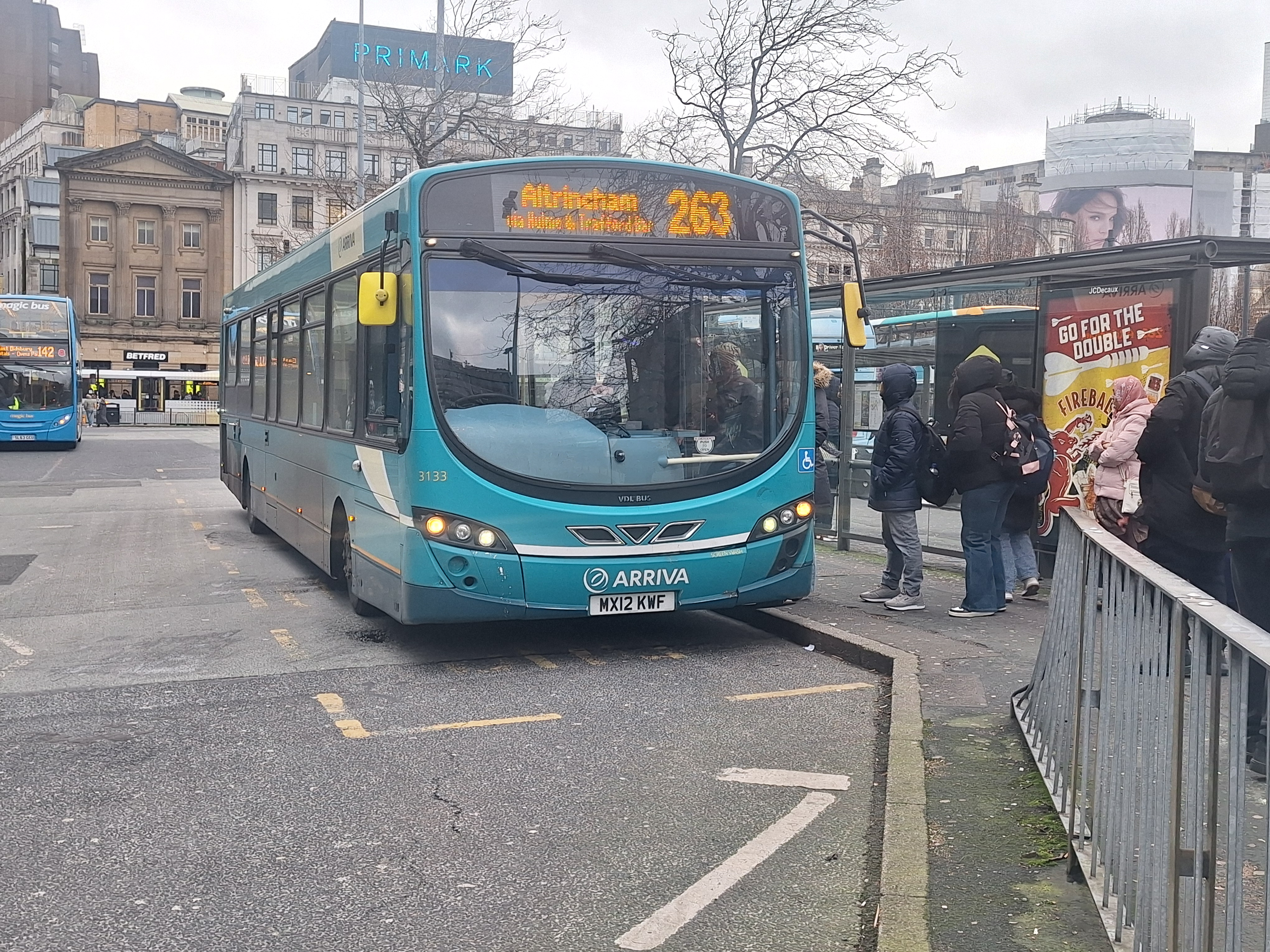
Wright Pulsar 2 bodied VDL SB200 boarding at Piccadilly Gardens bus station in September 2024

Arriva North West was originally formed following the split of Ribble Motor Services in preparation for privatisation in 1986, with the operations in Merseyside, West Lancashire and Wigan trading as North Western. The name was taken from the former North Western operations, which ran between 1923 and 1976. In 1988 the North Western operations were sold to Drawlane who was later sold to British Bus, who also took over the operations of the Bee Line Buzz Company, who ran services in Greater Manchester. In 1996, British Bus was bought by the Cowie Group. In November 1997 Cowie was rebranded as Arriva, with North Western rebranded to Arriva North West in 1998.

In February 2000, Arriva North West purchased MTL Trust Holdings, which created a dominant presence in the Merseyside area and more than doubled the size of the company. To satisfy Competition Commission requirements resulting from Arriva's regional dominance, Arriva sold MTL's Gillmoss depot to a management buyout team later renamed Glenvale Transport, which took over operations from Arriva on 15 July 2001.

In 2002, Arriva North West merged with Arriva Buses Wales to form Arriva North West & Wales. Three former Arriva Midlands depots in Crewe, Macclesfield and Winsford were transferred into the North West & Wales operation, although Crewe depot closed in December 2005.

In July 2005, Arriva purchased Blue Bus & Coach Services for £2.9 million, almost doubling their presence in Greater Manchester with the acquisition of two depots, 86 vehicles and 218 members of staff. Arriva closed Blue Bus' depot in Eccles and moved operations there to its St Andrew's Square depot, however the Bolton depot was retained. In January 2009, the Wales operation was split from Arriva North West as Arriva Buses Wales, with the Arriva North West name resurrected for the North West England operations.

=== Downsizing ===
Arriva North West's operations were severely affected by the rollout of Greater Manchester's Bee Network and the Liverpool City Region's Metro bus franchising schemes from 2023 onwards. Arriva did not bid for any Bee Network franchises and sold their two depots to Transport for Greater Manchester, losing their Bolton depot to Diamond North West in September 2023 and eventually exiting Greater Manchester when their sole remaining depot in Wythenshawe transferred to Metroline Manchester on 5 January 2025.

Though the company did bid for Metro fracnhise contracts, Arriva's presence in the Liverpool City Region was also severely reduced when depots in St Helens and Birkenhead were transferred in October 2026 to Stagecoach Merseyside and South Lancashire and Go North West's Merseyside operation respectively.

== Depots ==
The company has depots in:

- Bootle - Hawthorne Road
- Liverpool (Stoneycroft) - Green Lane
- Liverpool (Speke) - Shaw Road
- Runcorn - Beechwood Avenue
- Southport - Canning Road

Past depots, now closed or sold, have included:

- Birkenhead - Laird Street - (Transferred to Go North West in October 2026 as part of Metro franchising)
- Bolton - Folds Road (transferred to Diamond North West upon commencement of franchised Bee Network bus services in September 2023)
- Crewe - Delamere Street (closed December 2005)
- Gillmoss - East Lancashire Road (sold to Glenvale Transport in July 2001 in response to a Competition Commission requirement)
- Huyton - Wilson Road (closed 2006)
- Macclesfield - Lyme Green - Gaw End Lane (closed April 2023)
- Manchester - St Andrew's Square (near Manchester Piccadilly station (closed March 2012)
- Skelmersdale - Neverstitch Road (closed 23 July 2011)
- St Helens - Jackson Street - (Transferred to Stagecoach Merseyside and South Lancashire in September 2026 upon commencement of Metro franchising)
- Warrington - Athlone Road (closed February 2002)
- Winsford - Road Four, Winsford Industrial Estate (closed April 2023)
- Wythenshawe (Manchester) - Greeba Road, Roundthorn Industrial Estate (acquired by Metroline Manchester upon commencement of franchised Bee Network bus services in January 2025)

== Fleet ==
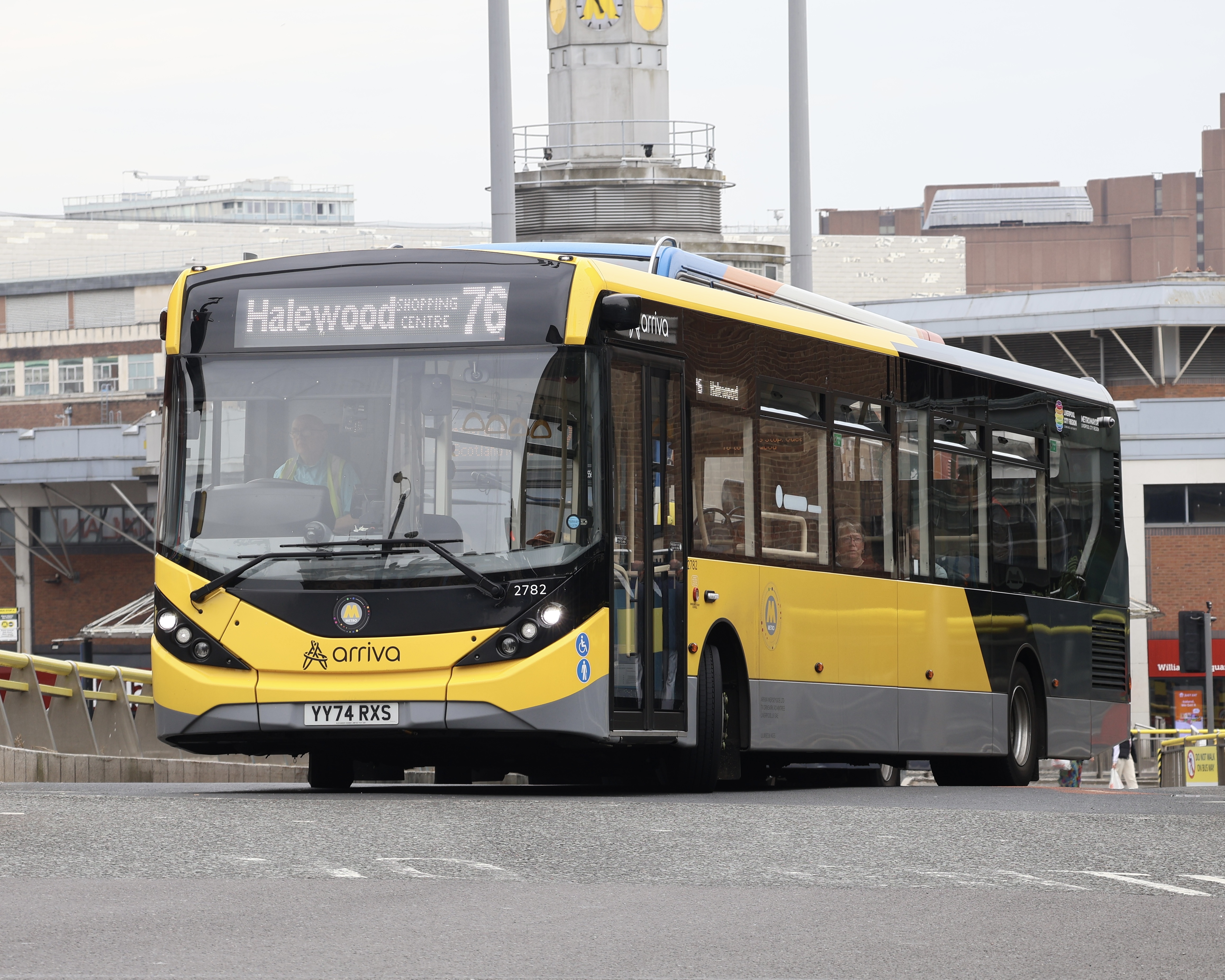
Metro liveried Alexander Dennis Enviro200 MMC at Queen Square bus station in June 2025

Wright Eclipse Gemini 3 bodied Volvo B5LH at Queen Square bus station in September 2026

As of November 2023, the Arriva North West fleet consists of 605 buses operated out of the company's eight depots.

=== Alternative fuels ===
During the 2010s, Arriva North West heavily invested in Wright Eclipse Gemini bodied Volvo B5LH hybrid electric double decker buses, operated mainly alongside its fleet of conventional diesel Alexander Dennis Enviro400s. Arriva first took delivery of 44 Volvo B5LH hybrids with Wright Eclipse Gemini 2 bodywork in spring 2013, with eleven delivered to Bolton and 33 delivered to Birkenhead for "CrossRiver" branded services. An additional 51 Volvo B5LH hybrids with Wright Gemini 3 bodywork later entered service at Green Lane and Speke depots in early 2017 on services in Liverpool, after initial use on rail replacement services.

Alongside the large fleet of hybrid electric buses, Arriva North West has also invested in smaller amounts of zero-emissions buses. In 2014, nineteen Caetano EcoCity compressed natural gas-powered buses entered service with the company, followed by a batch of twelve BYD Alexander Dennis Enviro200EV battery electric buses at Green Lane depot in November 2017, which were both the first fully electric powered vehicles operated by Arriva North West and the first Enviro200EVs to be delivered to an operator in the United Kingdom outside London.

Arriva North West took delivery of ten Alexander Dennis Enviro400FCEV fuel cell buses funded by the Liverpool City Region Combined Authority in early 2023, intended for use on service 10A between Liverpool and St Helens via Knowsley in partnership with Stagecoach Merseyside and South Lancashire, however issues with the supply of hydrogen fuel have meant that Arriva's Enviro400FCEVs entered service sporadically between 2023 and 2024, and it was announced in December 2025 that the buses were to be converted to battery electric power.

== See also ==
- List of bus operators of the United Kingdom
