= Stagecoach Merseyside and South Lancashire =

Bus operator in North West England

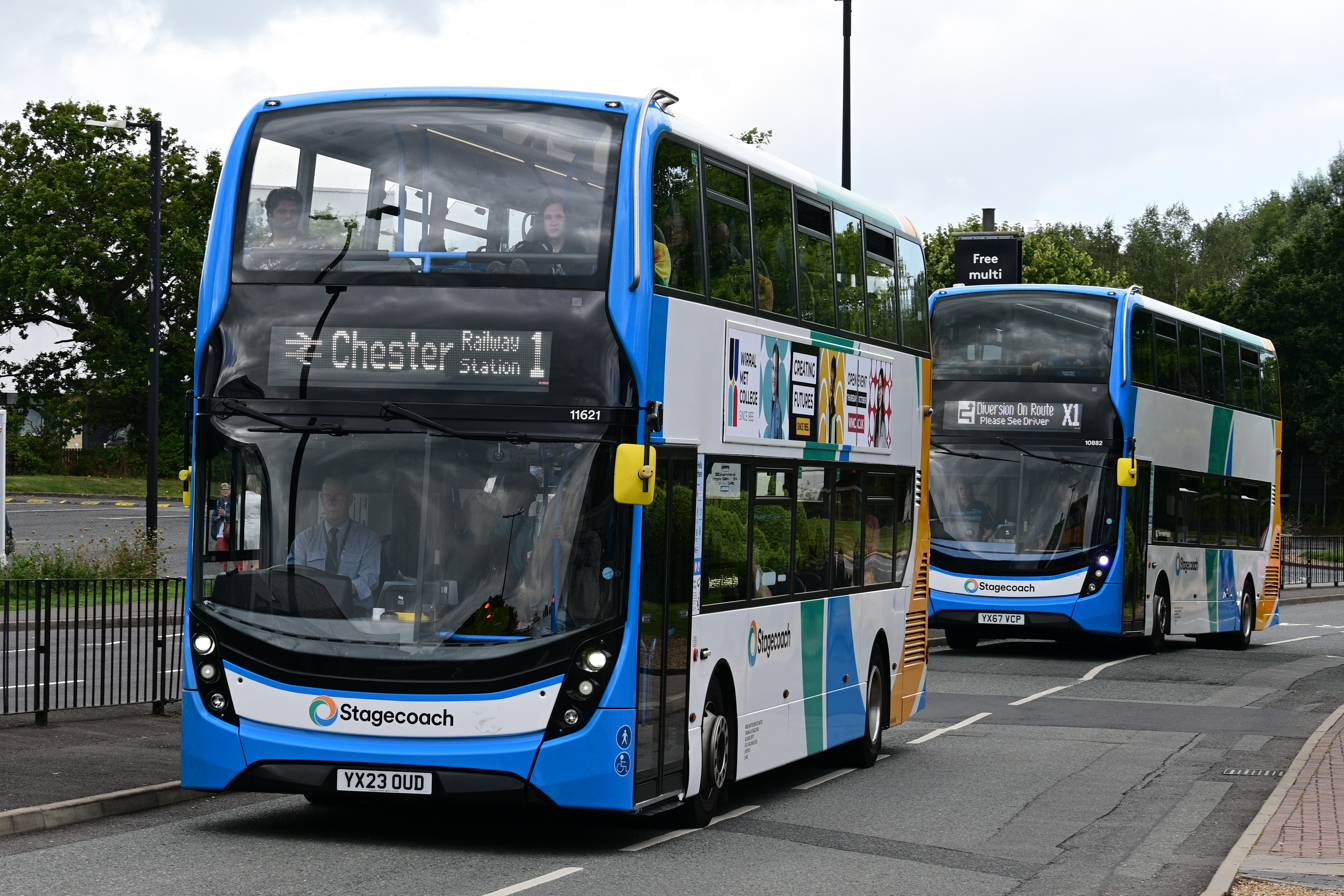
- Alexander Dennis Enviro400 MMCs at the Cheshire Oaks Designer Outlet in August 2024
- Parent: Stagecoach Group
- Founded: 2011; 15 years ago
- Headquarters: Gillmoss bus depot Liverpool, Merseyside
- Service area: Cheshire; Lancashire; Merseyside; Wrexham
- Hubs: Birkenhead; Bolton; Chester; Liverpool
- Depots: 4
- Fleet: 380 (August 2024)
- Chief executive: Matt Davies
- Website: Official website

Stagecoach Merseyside and South Lancashire is a major operator of bus services in North West England. It is a subsidiary of the Stagecoach Group and is headquartered in Liverpool.

== History ==
Stagecoach Merseyside and South Lancashire can trace its origins to the purchase of both Ribble Motor Services in 1988 from the National Bus Company and Glenvale Transport in 2005. The subsidiary was formed in 2011 following the merger of Stagecoach Merseyside and Stagecoach North West's Chorley and Preston operations, the latter of which were registered under Ribble Motor Services Ltd.

== Operations ==
=== Stagecoach in Lancashire ===
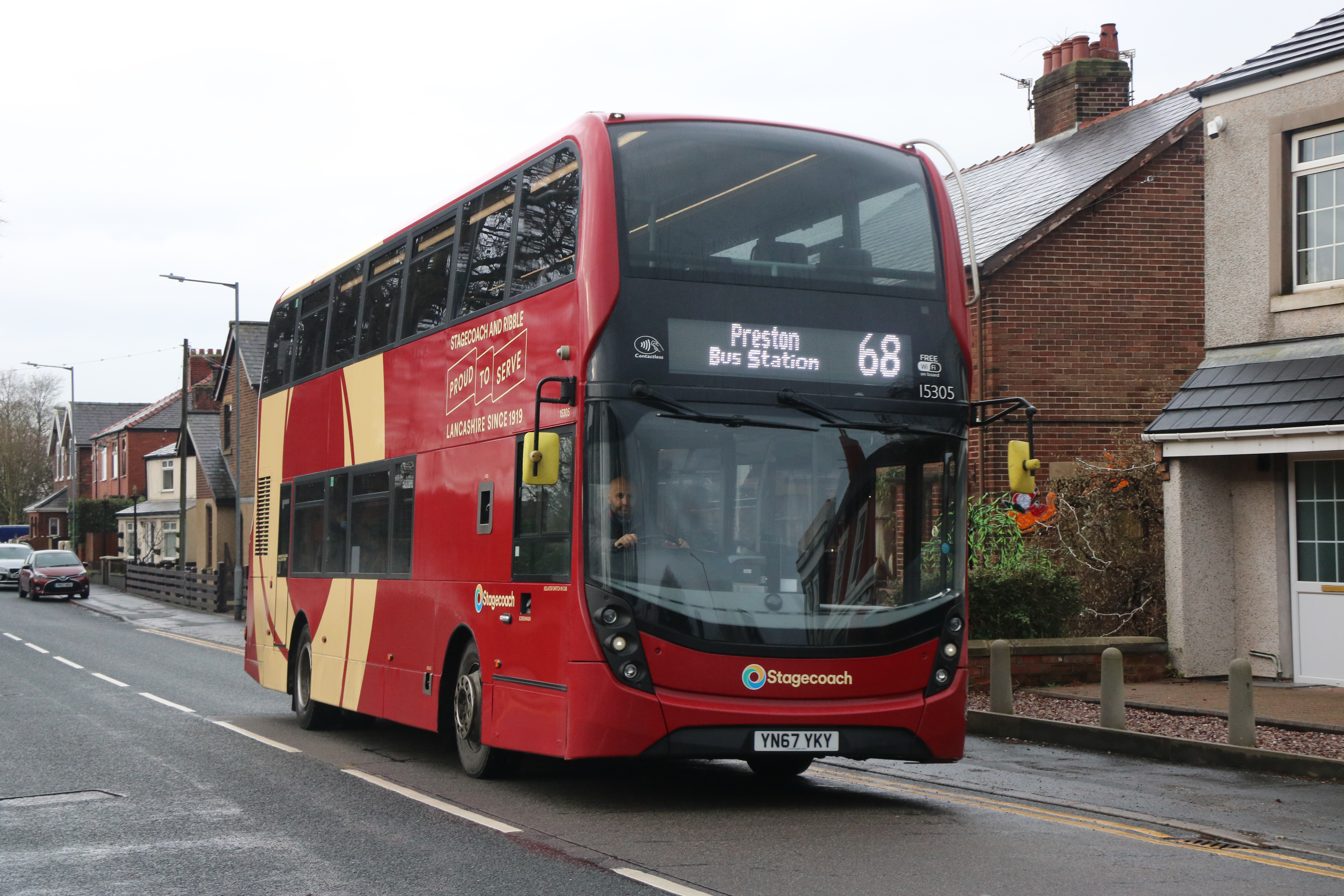
Alexander Dennis Enviro400 MMC bodied Scania N250UD in Ribble Motor Services heritage livery in December 2021

Stagecoach Merseyside and South Lancashire predominantly operates services around the Central Lancashire area, serving the communities of Preston, Chorley, Bolton and Blackburn. The company also operated the 'Network Chorley' brand, which provided transport around the local Chorley area until 2012.

Stagecoach closed its Chorley depot on Eaves Lane depot in October 2015, replacing it with by outstation on an industrial estate on the outskirts of the town. Some services and older vehicles based at the depot were transferred to Preston.

Following the collapse of Leyland independent operator John Fishwick & Sons into administration in October 2015, Stagecoach immediately took on the operator's 111 service to Preston to Leyland, later negotiating with Lancashire County Council to run services 115 and 119. This arrangement was maintained until March 2016.

Stagecoach lost funding from Lancashire County Council in 2016 and consequently had to cancel and revise multiple routes across the county that were subsidised by council funding.

In November 2025, the Stagecoach Group announced it was reorganising some of its subsidiaries geographically to align them with current or future bus franchising schemes. On 1 December 2025, Stagecoach Manchester merged with Stagecoach Merseyside and South Lancashire, with Preston depot and the Chorley outstation transferring to neighbouring subsidiary Stagecoach Cumbria and North Lancashire.

==== Gold network ====
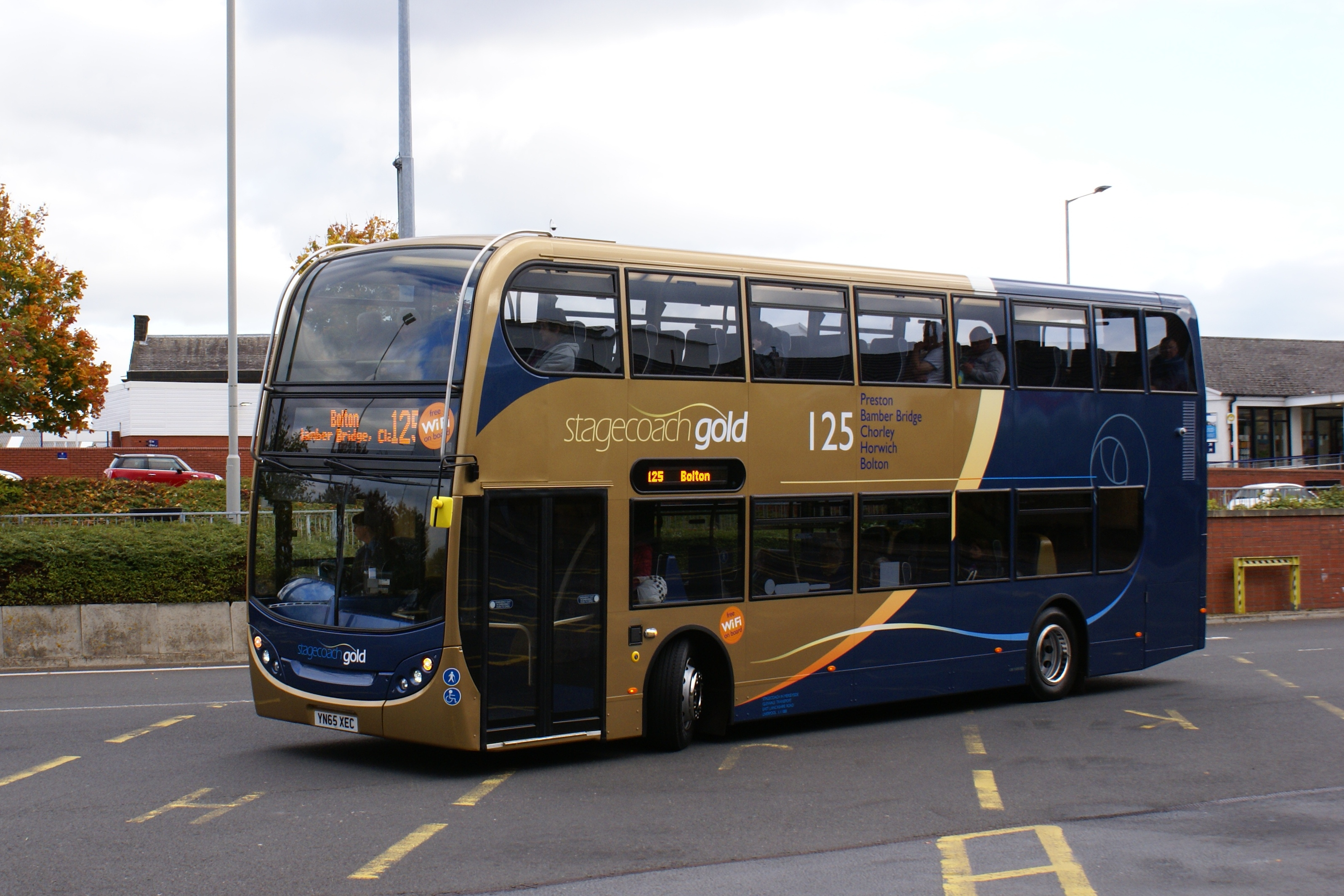
Stagecoach Gold-liveried Alexander Dennis Enviro400-bodied Scania N230UD in Chorley in October 2015.

As of August 2024, Stagecoach operates Gold-specification buses on services 125 between Bolton and Preston and the 471/472 between Heswall and Liverpool. Buses on these routes are actively being debranded in line with the gradual repainting of the fleet into current livery.

Stagecoach Merseyside and South Lancashire's Gold network was launched in November 2015, following the delivery of eighteen Alexander Dennis Enviro300s for use on services 1 and 2 between Liverpool, Wirral and Chester, as well as a fleet of 24 Alexander Dennis Enviro400-bodied Scania N230UD double-decker buses delivered for service 125 between Bolton and Preston.

Stagecoach's Gold network expanded further in Merseyside with the delivery of Alexander Dennis Enviro400 MMCs to upgrade the 471 and 472 services between Heswall and Liverpool to Gold specification. This also coincided with the delivery of ten Enviro400 MMCs built with similarly high-specification interiors on Scania N250UD chassis for the Liverpool-Southport-Preston X2 express service. Further Gold buses were transferred from other Stagecoach divisions in January 2019 in order to upgrade service 38 between West Kirby and Eastham to the specification.

=== Stagecoach in Merseyside ===
Metro-liveried Alexander Dennis Enviro400EV at Queen Square Bus Station in September 2026

Stagecoach in Merseyside was the trading name of Glenvale Transport Ltd, which was purchased by Stagecoach in 2005. The original company was formed in 2001 by the staff and management of Gillmoss depot, formerly operated by MTL North, after Arriva was ordered in 2000 by the Competition Commission to sell it in order to avoid a public inquiry for operating a monopoly of services in Merseyside.

After having been beaten themselves by Gillmoss' management to acquire the depot in 2001, the Stagecoach Group purchased Glenvale Transport in August 2005 for £3.4 million, beating competition from rivals FirstGroup, Go-Ahead Group and Transdev Blazefield while taking on Glenvale's net debts of £7.8 million. Following the sale, Stagecoach immediately invested £6.5 million in new buses to reduce the age profile of the elderly Glenvale fleet.

In August 2011, the Stagecoach Group announced plans to restructure their bus operations in the North West of England with the former Stagecoach North West operations, which consisted of Stagecoach in Cumbria, Stagecoach in Lancashire and Stagecoach in Lancaster. The restructuring saw Stagecoach North West split up into two halves, with Cumbria and Lancaster operations merging into Stagecoach Cumbria & North Lancashire and Stagecoach in Merseyside merging with Stagecoach in Lancashire. The other Stagecoach operation in the region, Stagecoach Manchester, remained unaffected and continued as a separate operation.

In June 2023, Stagecoach announced it had purchased the operations and majority of the vehicles and employees of Aintree independent operator Peoplesbus. Operations transferred to Stagecoach Merseyside and South Lancashire's Gillmoss depot on 9 July, with a second iteration of Peoplesbus returning to Merseytravel contracts in January 2024.

In January 2026, Stagecoach was awarded a 'Category 1' tender to operate franchised Metro bus services in the Metropolitan Borough of St Helens, taking over the operations of Arriva Merseyside in the borough from October 2026. At the same time, however, Stagecoach lost its operations in the Metropolitan Borough of Wirral to Greater Manchester-based Go-Ahead Group operator Go North West.

=== Stagecoach in Chester and Wirral ===
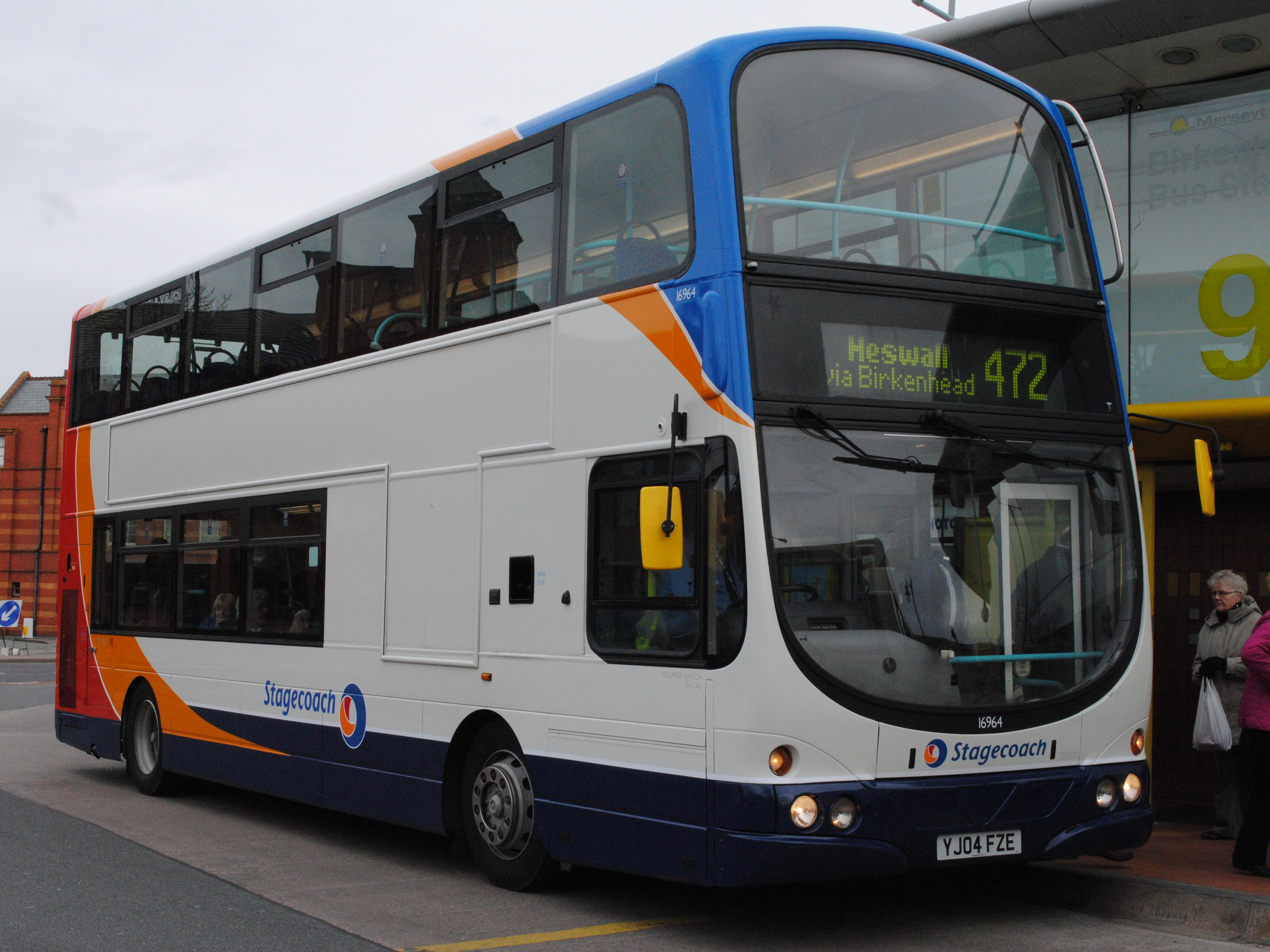
Wright Eclipse Gemini bodied Volvo B7TL acquired from First Chester & The Wirral in Birkenhead in March 2013

In November 2012, the Stagecoach Group announced they had agreed a deal to purchase the operations of First Chester & The Wirral from the FirstGroup for £4.5 million. The deal included the two main depots in Chester and Rock Ferry, as well as a depot in Wrexham used for school services, plus 110 buses and 290 employees. The purchase was made through Stagecoach's Merseyside subsidiary, Glenvale Transport. It was Stagecoach's second purchase from FirstGroup, following the purchase of First Greater Manchester's Wigan depot in October 2012.

The takeover was confirmed to be completed on 13 January 2013, with Stagecoach originally using the buses and ticket machines acquired directly from First. Stagecoach soon integrated the Chester & the Wirral operation into the group by repainting the acquired buses into fleet livery, transferring in old fleet vehicles from other areas and purchasing new buses and ticket machines.

One of the services acquired with First Chester & the Wirral was the Cheshire West and Chester Council contract to operate the Chester Park & Ride network. In September 2015, Stagecoach were awarded by the council to continue running the service from July 2016 until 2021, with branded Wright Eclipse Urban bodied Volvo B7RLEs acquired from First replaced with twelve new Alexander Dennis Enviro200 MMCs following the start of the contract.

From July 2016, Stagecoach's Chester depot was one of numerous regional operators who took on several GHA Coaches services after the firm went into administration.

== Fleet and depots ==
As of August 2024, Stagecoach Merseyside and South Lancashire operates a fleet of 380 buses from four depots in Chester, Chorley, Gillmoss in Liverpool and the Wirral Peninsula.

Stagecoach has experimented with fleets of zero-emissions vehicles in co-operation with Merseytravel within the Liverpool City Region. In 2018, a Volvo 7900e battery electric bus equipped with a pantograph charger was trialled on services 82 and 86 between Liverpool One bus station and Liverpool John Lennon Airport, with a charging station manufactured by ABB installed at the former. Stagecoach also has taken delivery of ten Alexander Dennis Enviro400FCEV fuel cell buses for joint operation with Arriva North West of service 10A between Liverpool and St Helens via Knowsley, however Stagecoach's buses remained out of service until mid-2024 due to a hydrogen fuel supply shortage; it was announced in December 2025 that the buses were to be converted to battery electric power. Two Yutong E10 battery electric buses are based at Preston for use on contracted runs from Preston to the BAE Systems site at Warton Aerodrome.
