= Pool Meadow Bus Station =

Bus station in Coventry, England

Coordinates: 52.410365°N 1.506999°W

Pool Meadow bus station
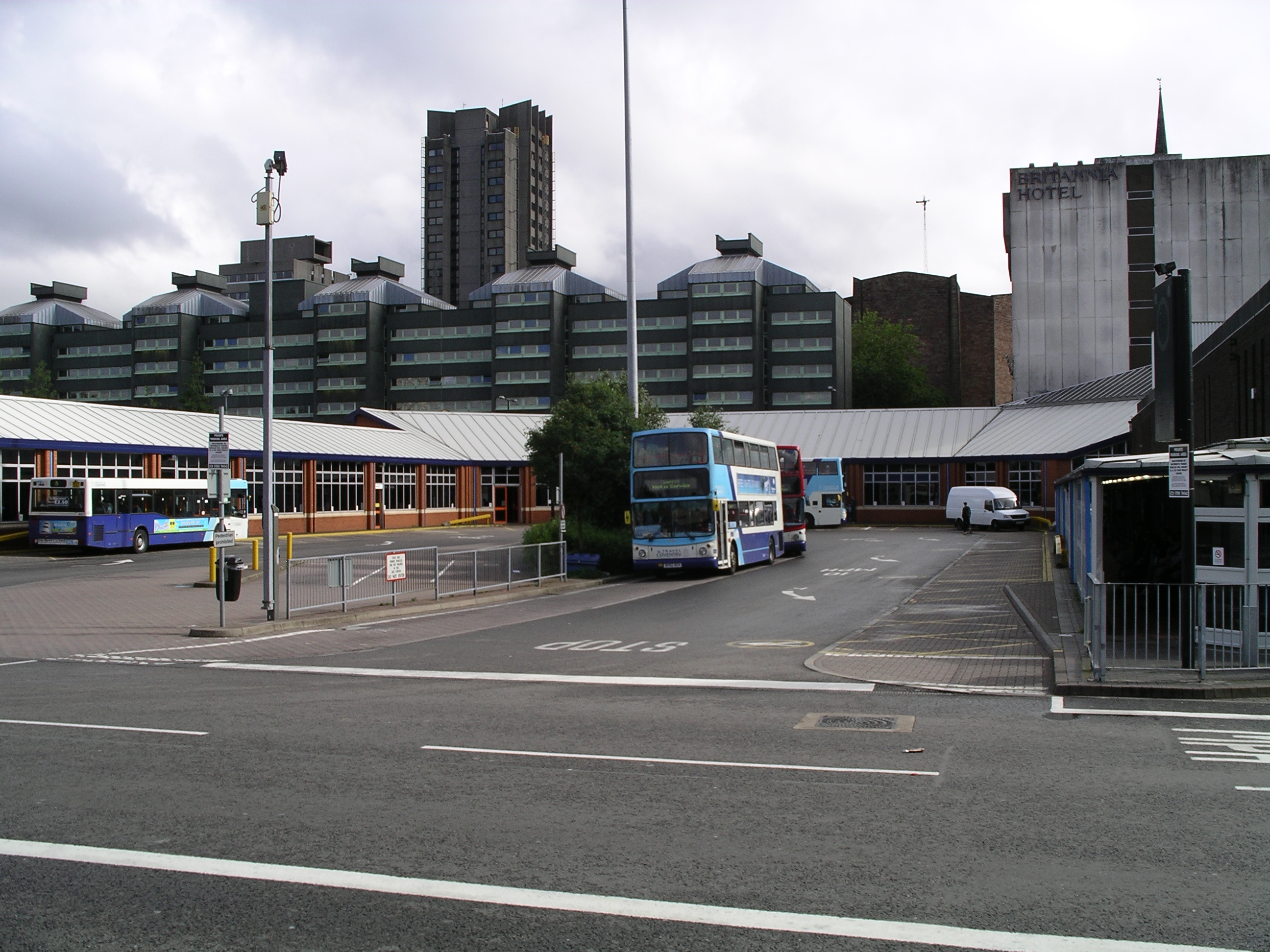

General information
- Location: Fairfax Street, Coventry; Coventry; England
- Operator: Transport for West Midlands
- Bus stands: 19
- Bus operators: Arriva East Midlands; National Express Coaches; Thandi Coaches; New Bharat; Stagecoach Midlands; West Midlands Bus
- Connections: Coventry railway station (0.6 miles [1 km])

History
- Opened: 1994
Location

Pool Meadow bus station is a bus station in the city of Coventry, England. It is managed by Transport for West Midlands. Local bus and national coach services operated by various companies serve the bus station which has 19 departure stands. West Midlands Bus has its depot adjacent to the bus station. The bus station is located at the opposite side of the city centre to Coventry railway station. It can be reached by a short walk or by a regular bus service.

A bus station has occupied the site since 1931 but the present building opened in 1994, work having begun on its construction in 1993. It replaced simple rows of bus shelters - initially installed as a temporary measure in the early 1960s which eventually stood for thirty years.

There are 19 departure stands, each labelled using letters between A and U. The first three stands are used for National Express Coaches services, the remaining for city scheduled bus services. Thandi and New Bharat also use the station on stands B and C. Electronic timetable displays are in use at most of these stands, as well as at the entrances to the bus station having been installed on 8 September 2008.

== Bus operator fees ==
Transport for West Midlands charge a fee to bus companies every time they use the bus station. Stagecoach in Warwickshire believes the fee is too high and have as a result excluded their commercial bus routes from serving the bus station.

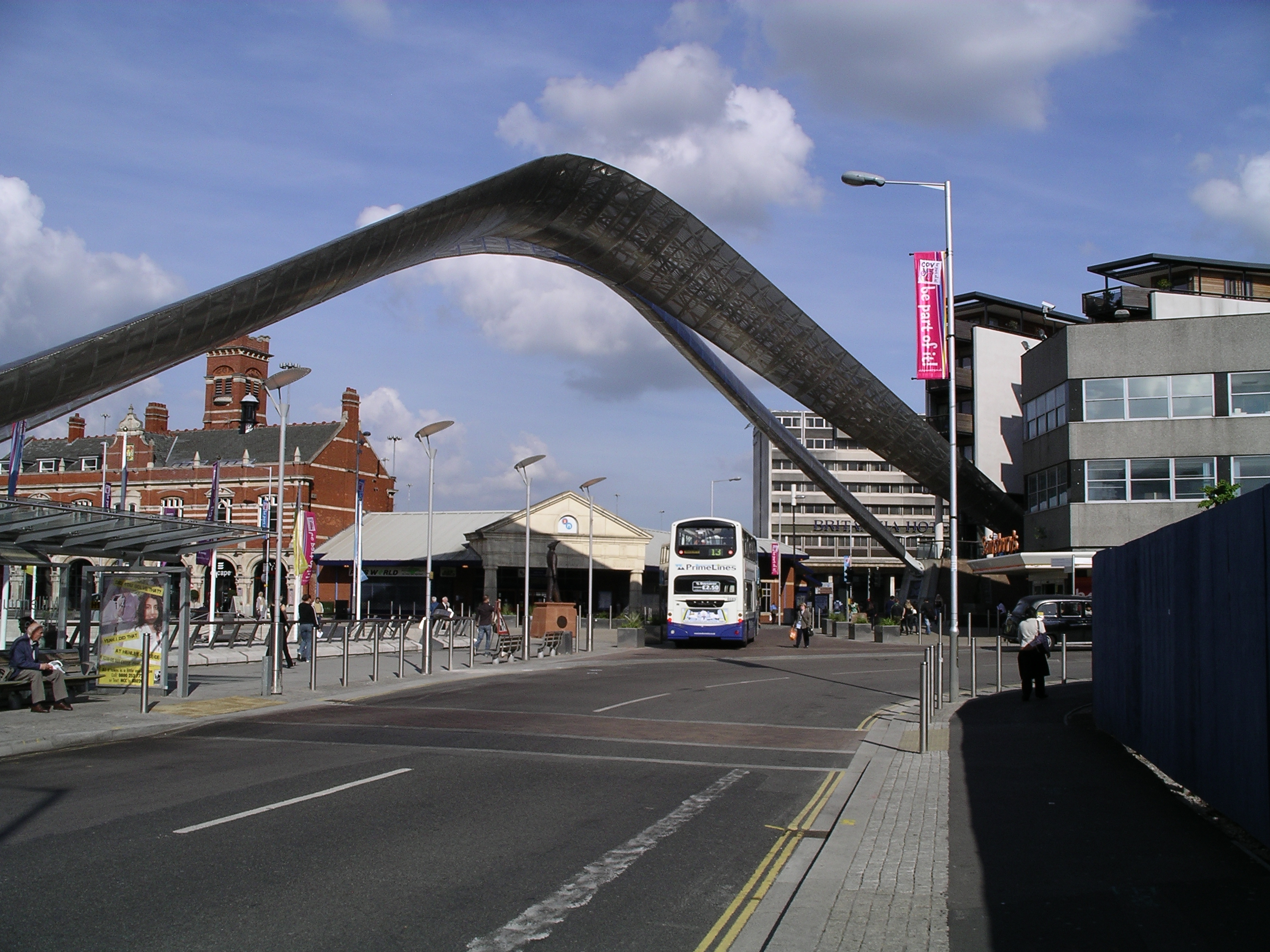
A National Express Coventry bus travelling under the Whittle Arches on its way to the Pool Meadow bus station

== Millennium Place ==
From 9 June 2002 to 1 April 2006 the development of the nearby Millennium Place traffic-free public square which intersects the Fairfax Street/Hales Street/Trinity Street junction had effectively "cut off" access between the bus station and the rest of the City Centre and only a few bus routes served the bus station as a result, it became regarded as a white elephant and was threatened with closure. On 2 April 2006 a controversial bus only link road cutting across Millennium Place was opened allowing many bus routes to start using the bus station again and protect its future, at this point National Express Coventry committed more bus services to the bus station than in the period prior to 9 June 2002.

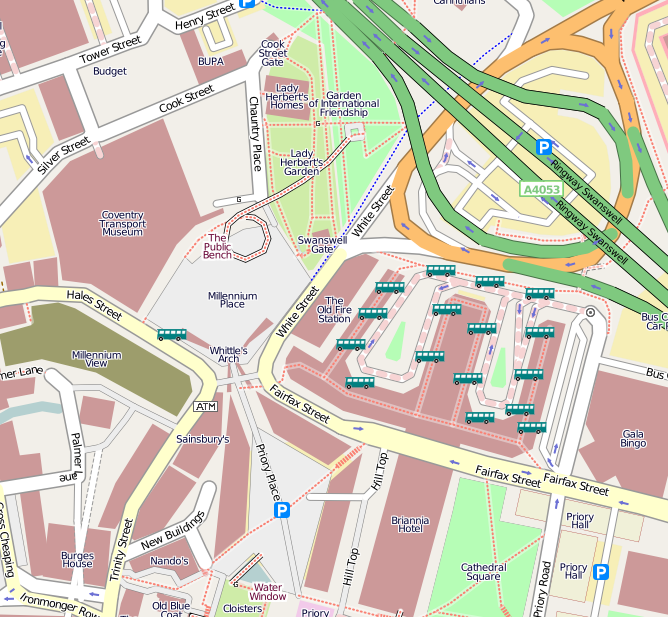
Pool Meadow bus station

== Improvements ==
On 5 February 2013 a new access route into the bus station from White Street/Hales Street between the old fire station and junction two of the ring road was opened, at a cost of £284,000. Construction began eight weeks beforehand on 15 December 2012. It is expected that a stop on the Coventry Very Light Rail tram system will be located there, linking it with the railway station and University Hospital Coventry.
