= Alexander Dennis Enviro400 =

Double-decker bus chassis and bodywork

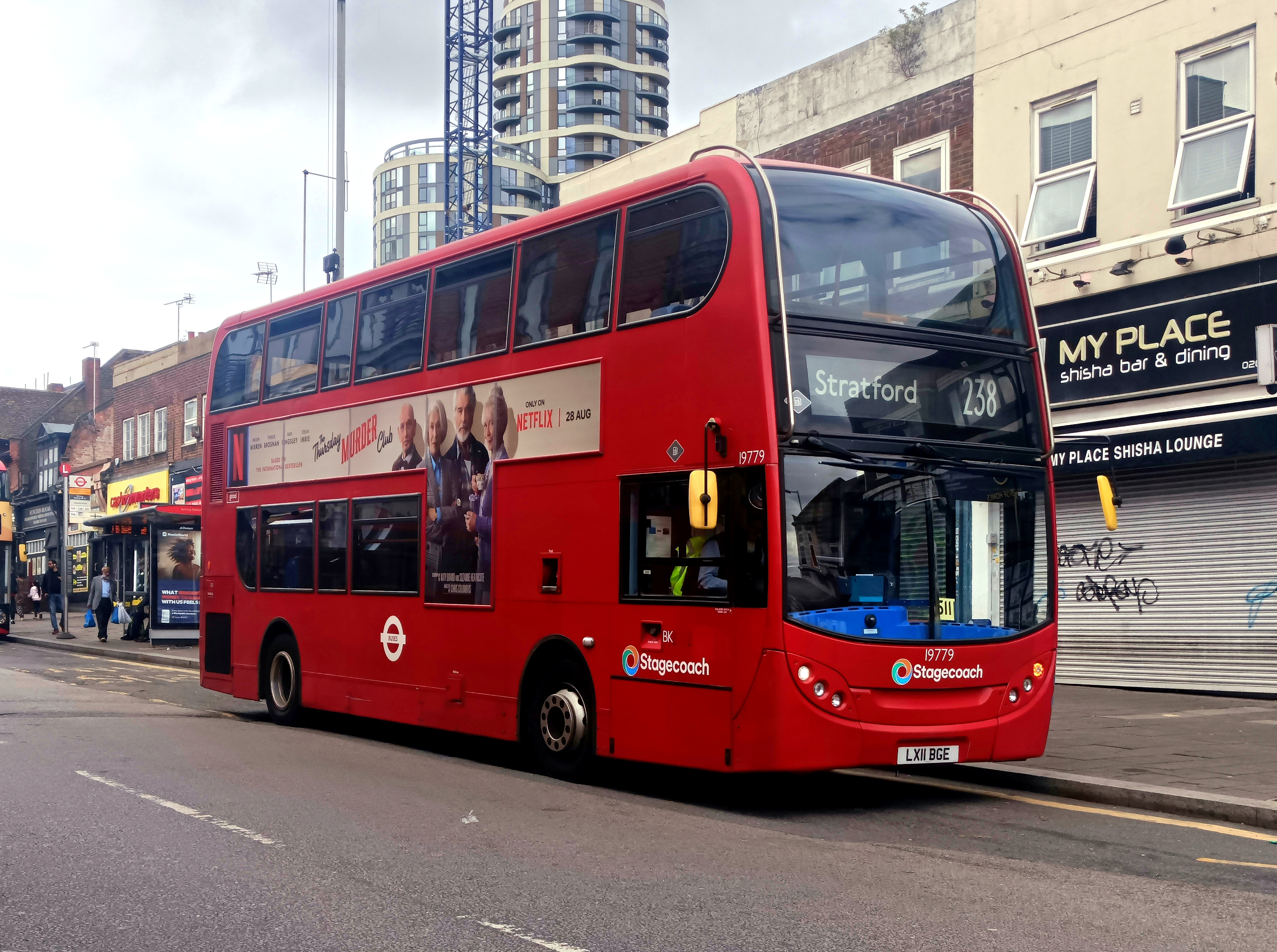
- Stagecoach London Enviro400 at Barking in 2025

Overview
- Manufacturer: Alexander Dennis
- Production: 2005–2018

Body and chassis
- Doors: Single or dual door
- Floor type: Low floor
- Chassis: Alexander Dennis Enviro400; Scania N230UD; Scania N280UD; Volvo B7TL; Volvo B9TL

Powertrain
- Engine: Cummins ISBe 6.7L/ISCe/ISLe (Enviro400); MAN D0836 (Enviro400); Volvo D7C (Volvo B7TL); Volvo D9B (Volvo B9TL); Scania DC9 (Scania N230UD)
- Capacity: 64–90 seated
- Transmission: Voith DIWA 854.5, 854.5E/864.5 4-speed automatic ZF 5HP502 5-speed automatic ZF EcoLife 6AP1203B/6AP1403B 6-speed automatic BAE Systems HybriDrive

Dimensions
- Length: 10.1 m (33 ft 2 in) to 11.4 m (37 ft 5 in)
- Width: 2.55 m (8 ft 4 in)
- Height: 4.2 m (13 ft 9 in) to 4.3 m (14 ft 1 in)
- Curb weight: 17,800 kilograms (39,200 lb)

Chronology
- Predecessor: Alexander ALX400, Dennis Trident 2
- Successor: Alexander Dennis Enviro400 MMC

The Alexander Dennis Enviro400 is a twin-axle low-floor double-decker bus that was built by the British bus manufacturer Alexander Dennis between 2005 and 2018. It replaced the Alexander ALX400 (from which the Enviro400 was developed). In 2014, the Enviro400 was succeeded by the updated Alexander Dennis Enviro400 MMC and production of the classic Enviro400 ceased in 2018.

The Enviro400 is available both as an integral bus and as a standalone bodywork and chassis. The Enviro400 chassis replaced the Dennis Trident 2 (and continued to be badged as the Trident for a time) and was formerly available with Optare Olympus bodywork; the Enviro400 body replaced the Alexander ALX400 designs and was sold on Scania N230UD and Volvo B9TL chassis.

The engine of the integral Enviro400 is a six-cylinder Cummins driving through a Voith or ZF automatic transmission, although a MAN D0836 engine began to be offered from 2007. A hybrid-electric version of the powertrain developed by BAE Systems was also available.

== Development ==
=== First generation (2005–2012) ===
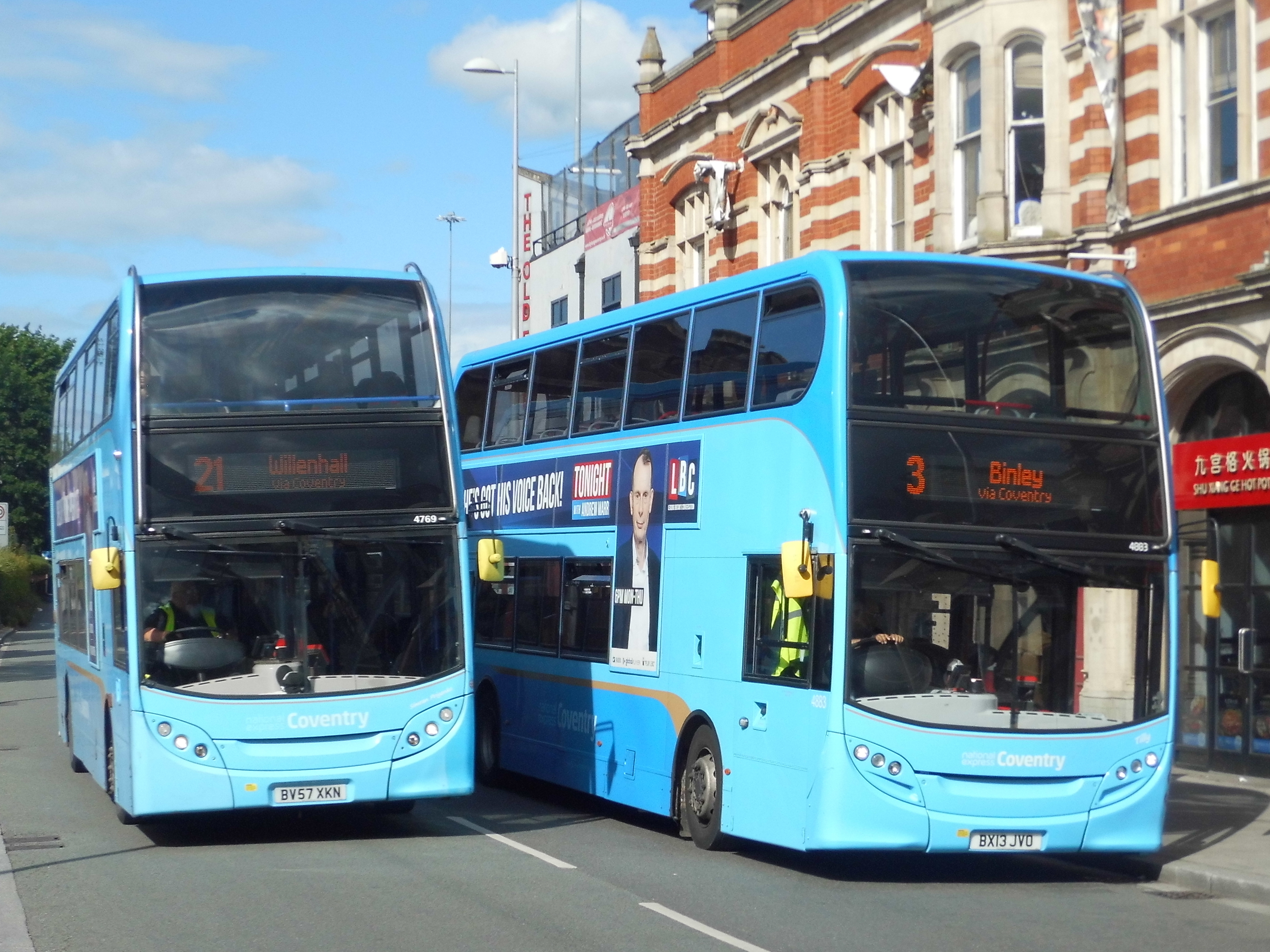
First generation (left) and second generation (right) Enviro400s of National Express Coventry, photographed in May 2022

The Enviro400 was originally launched as an integral product. Soon after launch, the Enviro400 chassis became available with Optare Olympus bodywork.

As well as an integral bus, the Enviro400 body was available on Scania N-series chassis. The vast majority of N-series Enviro400s built were of the N230UD variant, which sold well with Stagecoach Group. Additionally, two N-series Enviro400s were built on the more powerful N280UD variant of the chassis, both for Express Motors of Porthmadog.

As well as the Scania N-series, a single Enviro400 was constructed on Volvo B7TL chassis before this chassis was succeeded by the Volvo B9TL, on which more examples of the Enviro400 were bodied.

=== Second generation (2008–2018) ===
Alexander Dennis released the second generation Enviro400 at Euro Bus Expo in 2008, with the main external visual differences being the incorporation of a line of white LED daytime running lights underneath the headlights in the main front light clusters, redesigned front bumpers and the relocation of the offside emergency exit door. The facelift coincided with the introduction of a Euro 5 compliant drivetrain for the Enviro400. The Trident moniker on the chassis plates was largely dropped not long afterwards, but the Trident 2 name was retained on Enviro400s built for Hong Kong.

The second generation Enviro400 was superseded by the Enviro400 MMC in 2015 in the UK with no more orders, but in 2016 Alexander Dennis developed a low-height Enviro400 with Enviro400 MMC-style front and rear specifically for Hong Kong market.

== Powertrain variants ==
=== Integral Enviro400 ===
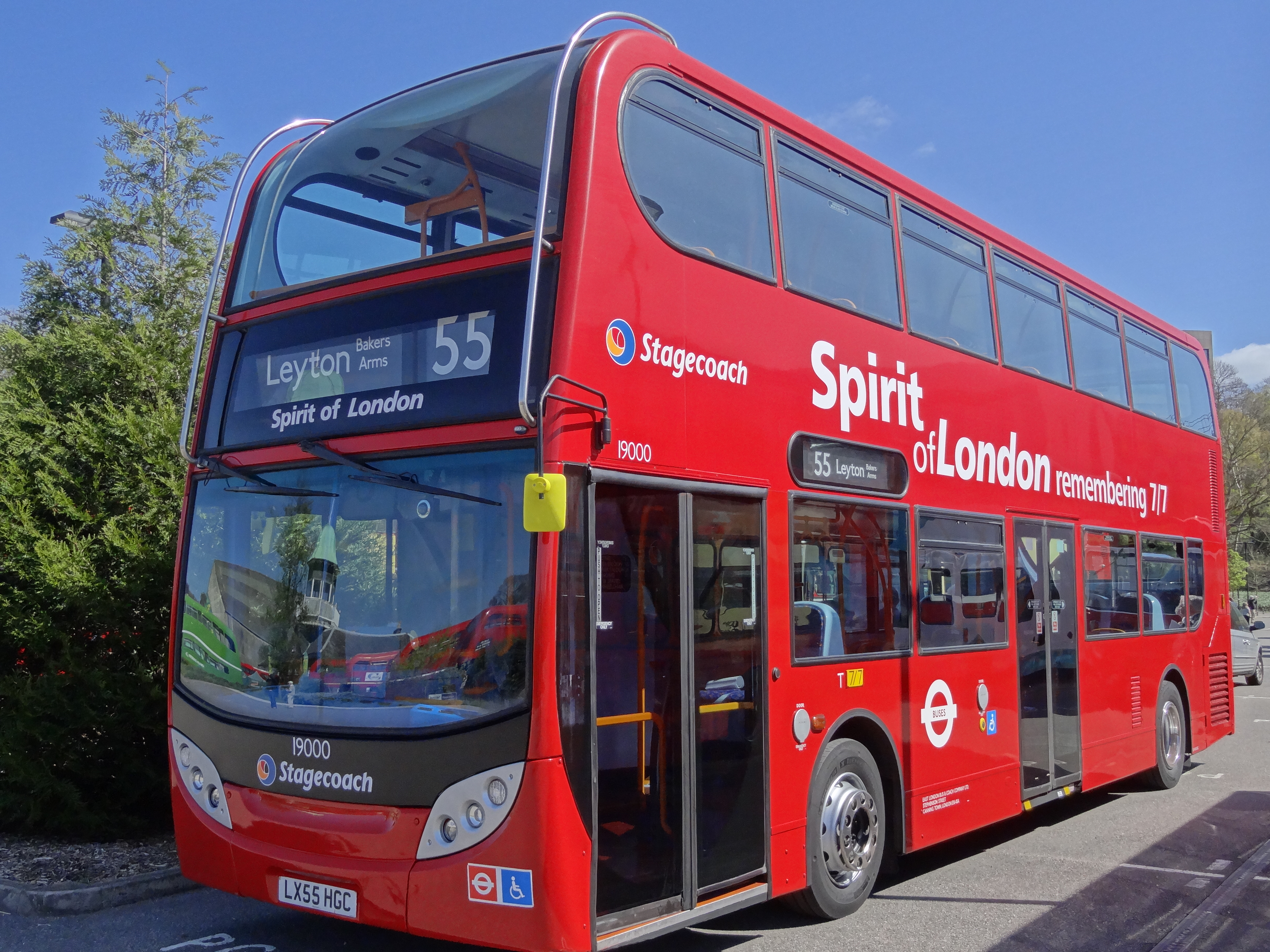
The first production Enviro400, Stagecoach 19000 Spirit of London, new in 2005, photographed in 2014

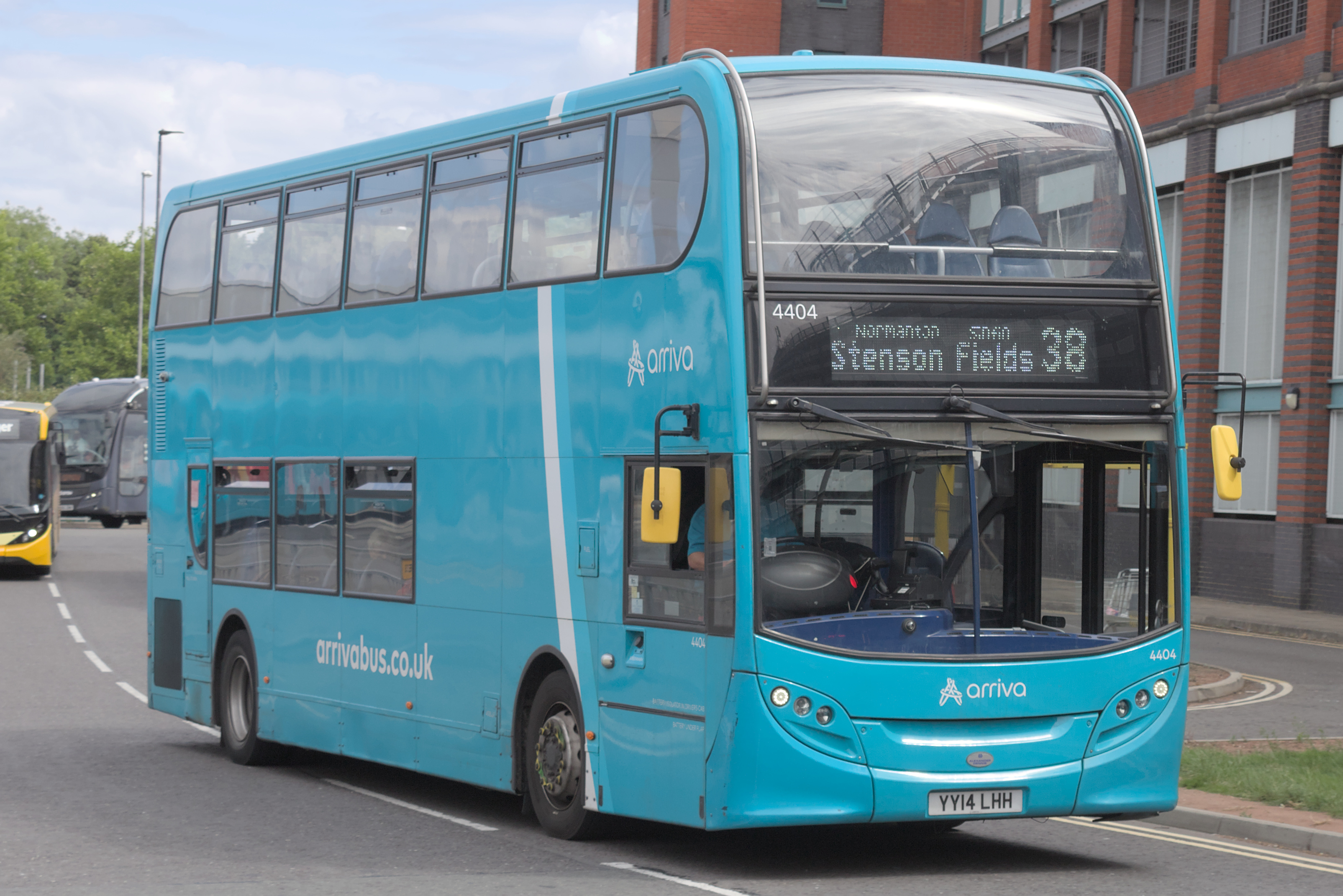
A second generation Enviro400 operated by Arriva Derby in August 2025

London operator Metroline was the first company to order the Enviro400, ordering 28 for route 24 in June 2005, entering service at the end of the year. One dual door demonstrator, named Spirit of London, was delivered to Stagecoach London to replace the Dennis Trident destroyed during the 7 July 2005 London bombings and a single door demonstrator was delivered to the then Travel West Midlands for evaluation. Both prototypes were exhibited at Coach & Bus Live 2005 in the National Exhibition Centre in Birmingham.

The Enviro400 sold well in London with a number of operators, such as Travel London and London General (which received the first Euro IV-engined Enviro400 in May 2006), operating these buses. It was also popular with the Stagecoach Group, which placed its first order of 130 low-height models in February 2006, followed by further orders for all group subsidiaries throughout the Enviro400's production run.

Arriva UK Bus also received Enviro400s for its group operations; Arriva Merseyside relaunched its Wirral - Liverpool 'Cross River' services with a batch of 23 in January 2009. A further batch of 12 was allocated to Bootle depot in September 2009 originally for the cross-Liverpool trunk service 60 linking Bootle with Aigburth. A much larger order of 128 Enviro400s was placed by Arriva Merseyside division from the mid-2010s onwards, with the first 28 arriving in the autumn of 2014 and the remainder being delivered between January and July 2015 to Bootle, Green Lane, St Helens, Southport and Speke depots. Arriva Buses Wales, meanwhile, received a total of 29 high specification Enviro400s between June 2014 and March 2015 for deployment on two new Sapphire services serving Rhyl to Llandudno and Chester to Connah's Quay respectively.

The FirstGroup received a large intake of Enviro400s ahead of both the 2012 Summer Olympics and the 2014 Commonwealth Games, which were held in London and Glasgow respectively. These operated under the license of First Games Transport, providing shuttle services throughout the Games before being dispersed to other operators within the group following the Games' conclusion. 60 Enviro400s were delivered to Glasgow in 2014. Later in 2014, eighteen Enviro400s were delivered to First West Yorkshire for operation in Leeds.

In 2008, a specially converted Enviro400 was assembled in knock-down kit form for the closing ceremonies of the 2008 Summer Olympics and 2008 Paralympic Games in Beijing. The bus featured as part of the handover ceremony for the 2012 Games, where it was driven into the Beijing National Stadium as a typical London bus before a set of hydraulic pumps opened up the bus, revealing a stage covered in artificial grass which was shaped as various London landmarks.

In 2012, Southern Vectis received 20 for school contracts on the Isle of Wight. These were delivered during late December 2012 and early January 2013 and entered service on a wide variety of school services on the island from 7 January 2013. Southern Vectis then proceeded to order ten more Enviro400s to be used on public routes, mainly route 9, which entered service in January 2014, followed by another order for ten Enviro400s which were delivered in 2016.

=== Enviro400H ===
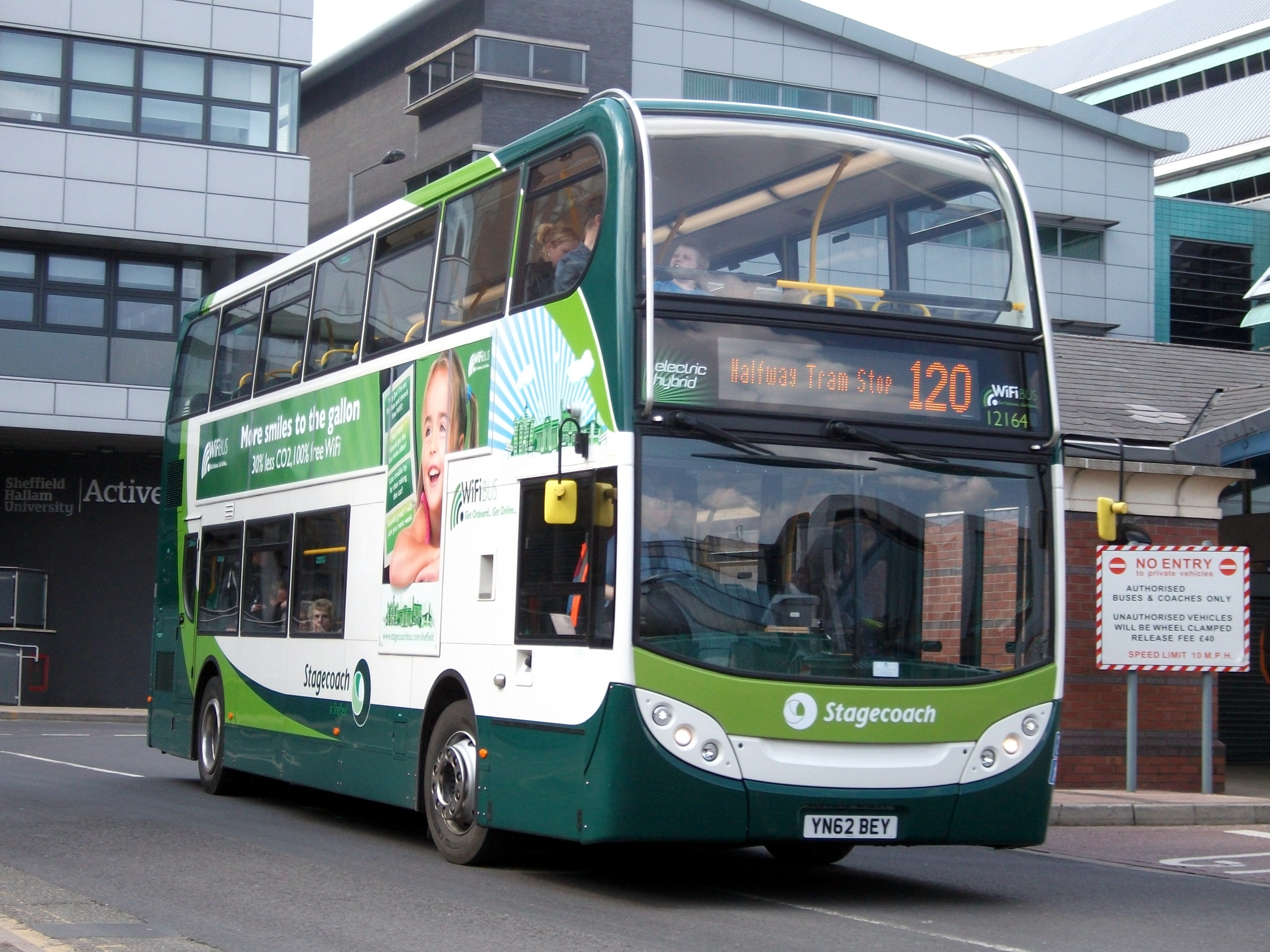
A Stagecoach Yorkshire Enviro400 Hybrid in the company's hybrid livery in Sheffield

Alexander Dennis launched the hybrid electric Enviro400 Hybrid (often shortened to Enviro400H) at the 2008 Euro Bus Expo, built with a hybrid drivetrain developed in partnership with BAE Systems. The first five production examples entered service with Metroline, followed by larger fleets of Enviro400Hs entering service with operators such as Go-Ahead London, London United, Abellio London and Stagecoach London.

Outside of London, the Enviro400H was popular with the Stagecoach Group who, starting in 2010, ordered examples delivered in a green variant of the standard Stagecoach livery for their Stagecoach Oxfordshire, Stagecoach Yorkshire, Stagecoach Manchester, and Stagecoach North East subsidiaries.

Other operators who purchased Enviro400Hs included the National Express West Midlands and National Express Dundee, ordering a total of nineteen for service in Birmingham and Dundee in 2013; East Yorkshire Motor Services, who purchased ten for cross-city services in Kingston upon Hull in 2011; Reading Buses, who had 31 Enviro400Hs delivered between 2010 and 2011; Lothian Buses, who took on 15 of the type in 2011; the Oxford Bus Company, who took on examples to upgrade its park & ride fleet, and First Glasgow. However, reliability issues and maintenance costs have seen many operators convert their Enviro400Hs to use diesel powertrains, with East Yorkshire providing most of these conversions, while Reading Buses converted one of their Enviro400Hs to a plug-in electric vehicle.

=== Scania Enviro400 ===
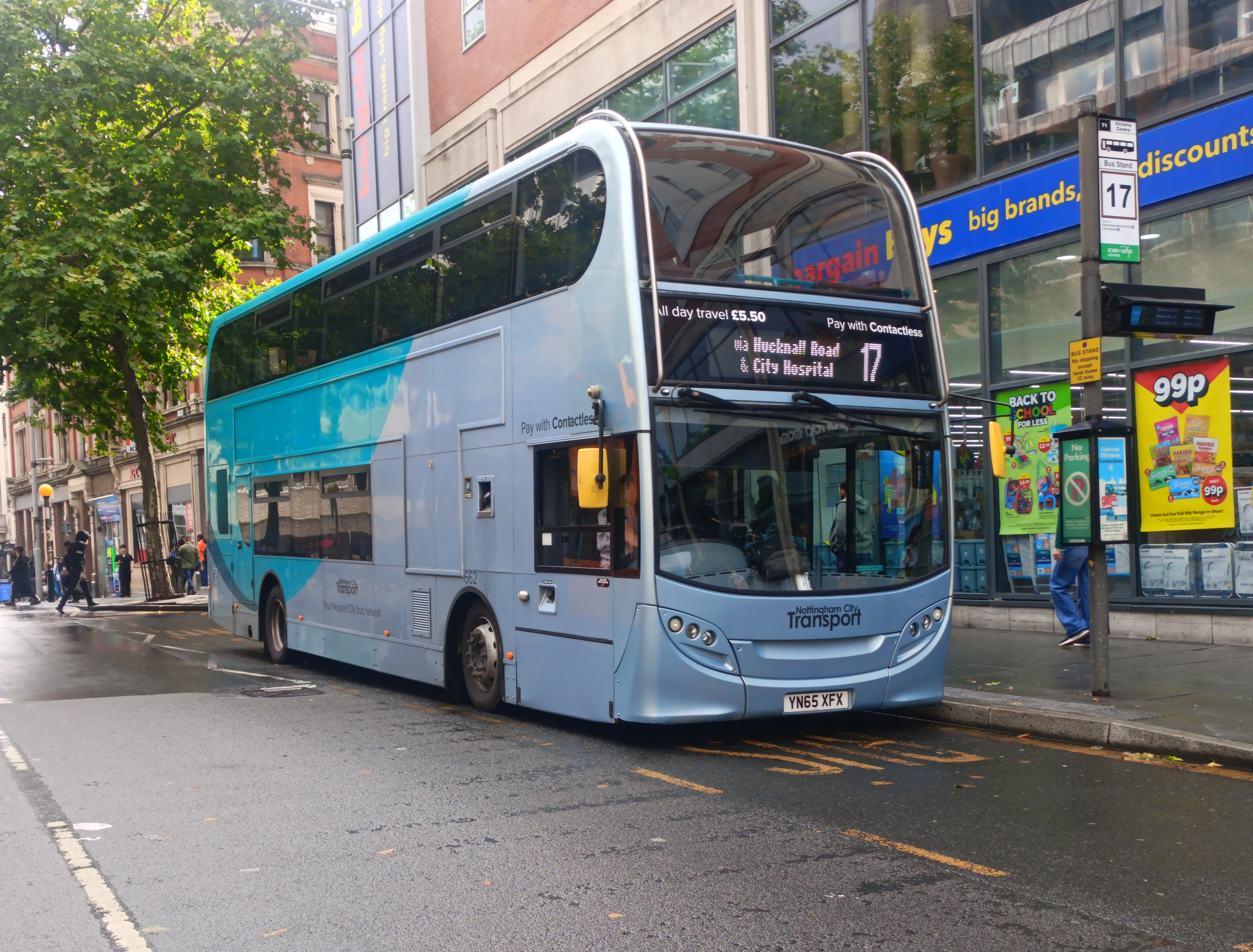
Nottingham City Transport Alexander Dennis Enviro400 bodied Scania N230UD in Nottingham City Centre in September 2025

Stagecoach standardised on the Scania N230UD with Alexander Dennis Enviro400 bodywork for their Stagecoach Gold services, the first of which entered service with Stagecoach West to upgrade route 94 serving Cheltenham and Gloucester to Gold standard. Further Gold-specification Scania-ADL Enviro400s were delivered throughout the type's production run to operators such as Stagecoach in Oxfordshire, Stagecoach Midlands for their X4 service, and Stagecoach Yorkshire.

Scania N230UDs with Enviro400 bodies fitted with guide wheels were also purchased for use on the Cambridgeshire Guided Busway, with the first buses delivered in 2009 prior to the opening of the Busway in 2011, followed by additional Enviro400s being purchased in 2014 and 2015. Elsewhere, conventional specification Scania N230UDs with Enviro400 bodies were purchased for certain Stagecoach divisions, including 22 examples for Stagecoach Devon for use on the North Devon Wave service in 2013, and five examples for Stagecoach in Lincolnshire in 2012 for Lincolnshire InterConnect services.

Another significant operator of Scania Enviro400s is Nottingham City Transport, who ordered a total of 62 Scania N230UD Enviro400s, with first deliveries beginning in 2014. Further examples were delivered throughout 2014 and 2015, with most receiving colour-coded route branding for services across the city. These Scania Enviro400s were delivered with audio-visual next stop announcements, mood lighting and leather seating.

The Oxford Bus Company received eleven high-specification Scania Enviro400s in 2009 for service on the Brookesbus network. Wilts & Dorset also received some examples. Two were delivered to independent operator Stephensons of Essex in 2013.

=== Volvo Enviro400 ===
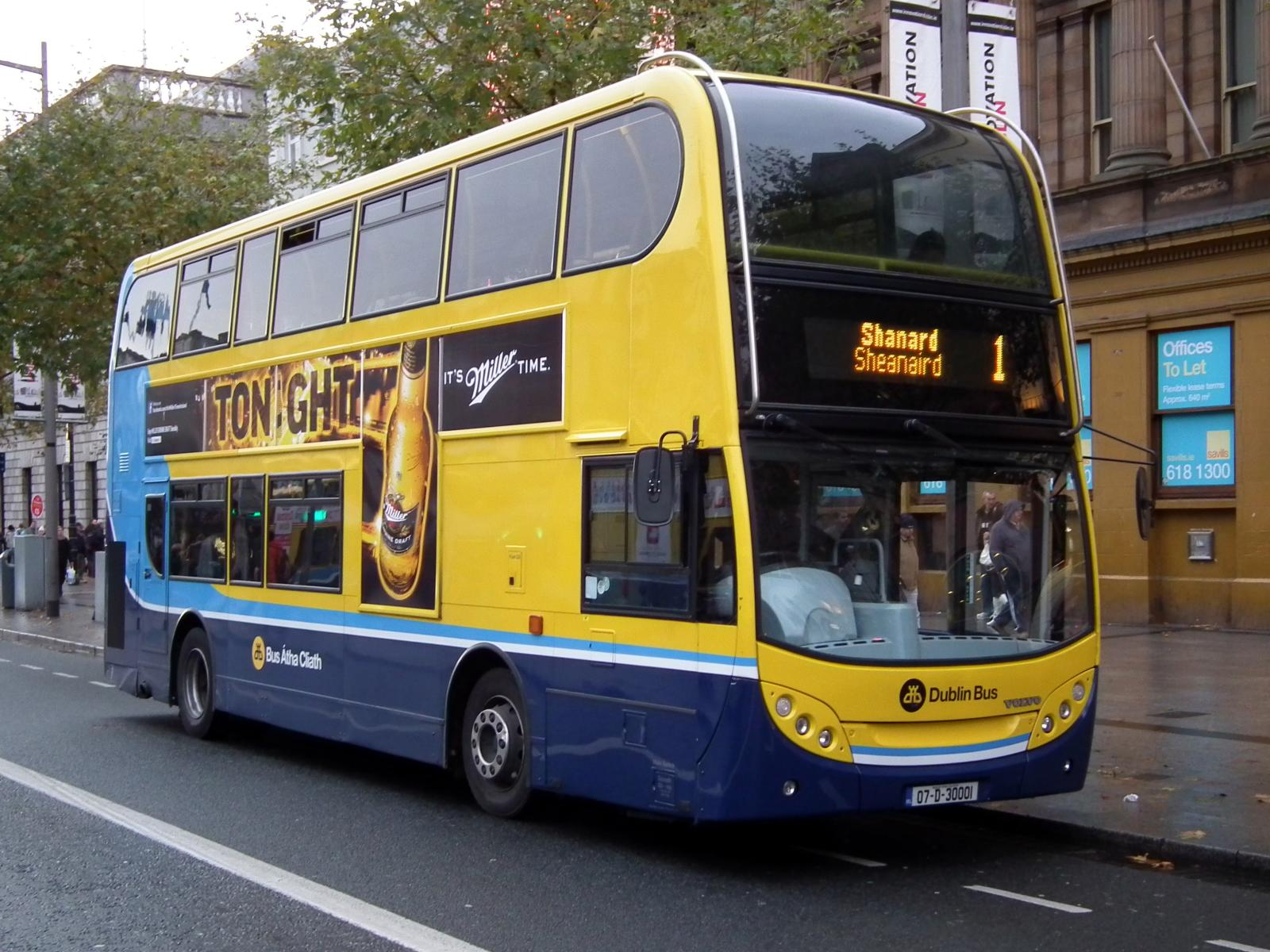
A Dublin Bus Volvo B9TL Enviro400 in Dublin, Ireland

On 13 October 2006, Solent Blue Line received a Volvo B7TL/Enviro400 meeting the Euro III emission standard, with the interior in Wilts & Dorset livery. This remains a one-off as all subsequent Enviro400s on Volvo chassis were built on the B9TL chassis. An Arriva demonstrator was shown at Euro Bus Expo in 2006 to the latter standard.

Irish municipal operator Dublin Bus was the first operator to order the Volvo B9TL-based Enviro400, taking delivery of 100 on the updated Volvo chassis in two batches between 2007 and 2008. East Yorkshire Motor Services later took delivery of five Enviro400-bodied Volvo B9TL in December 2007, which entered service in January 2008. London General also received three Enviro400-bodied Volvo B9TLs in October 2008, which were evaluated against integral Enviro400s and Wright Eclipse Gemini-bodied Volvo B7TL and B9TLs extensively featured in Go-Ahead's London Central and General fleets. No further orders resulted in the United Kingdom, although London General's Enviro400s were briefly loaned to Arriva London North for evaluation ahead of delivery of their Volvo B5LHs.

== Exports ==
Globally, more than 6,000 integral Enviro400s have been sold as of January 2016.

=== Hong Kong ===
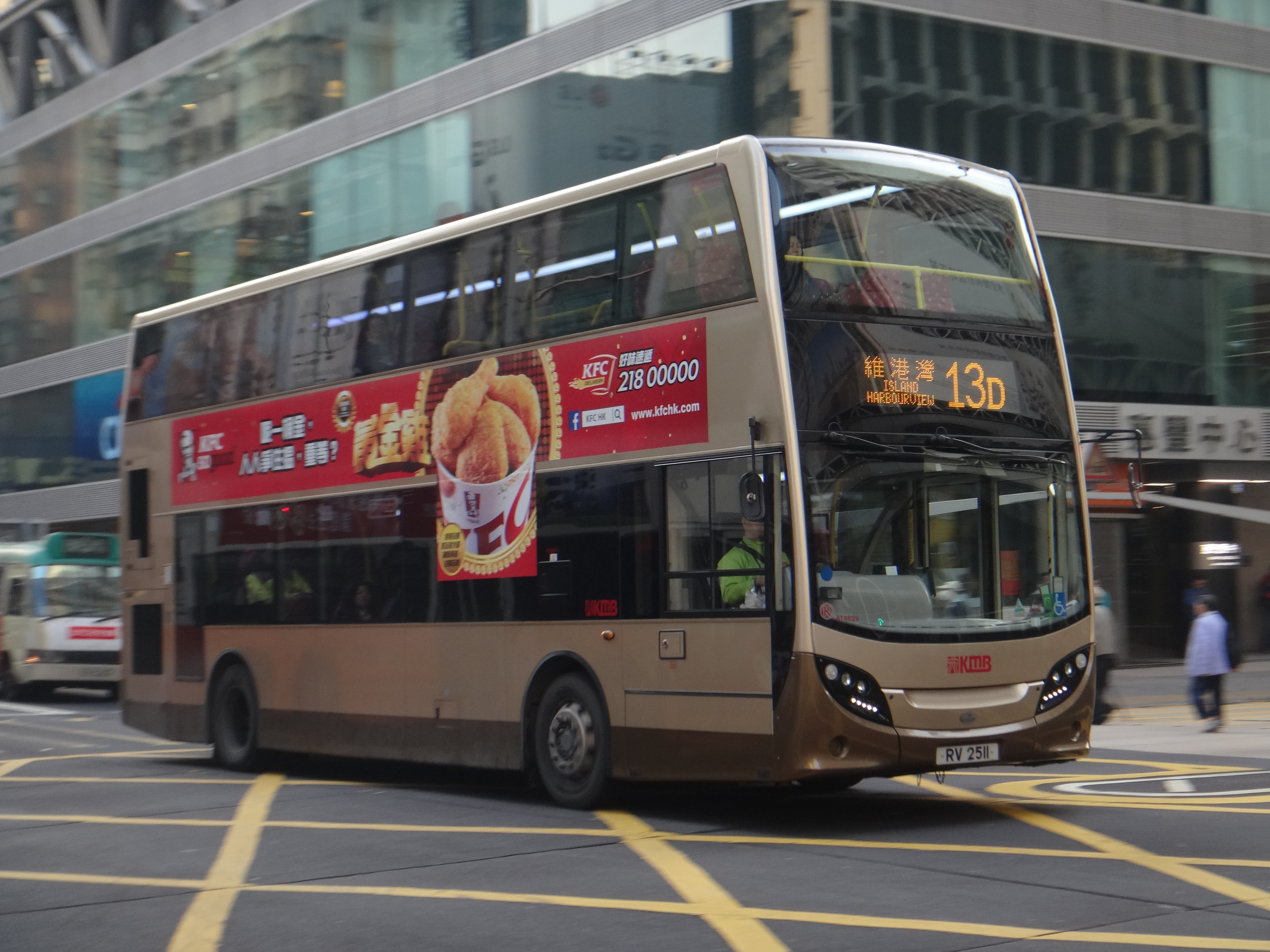
A Kowloon Motor Bus Enviro400 in Mong Kok, Hong Kong

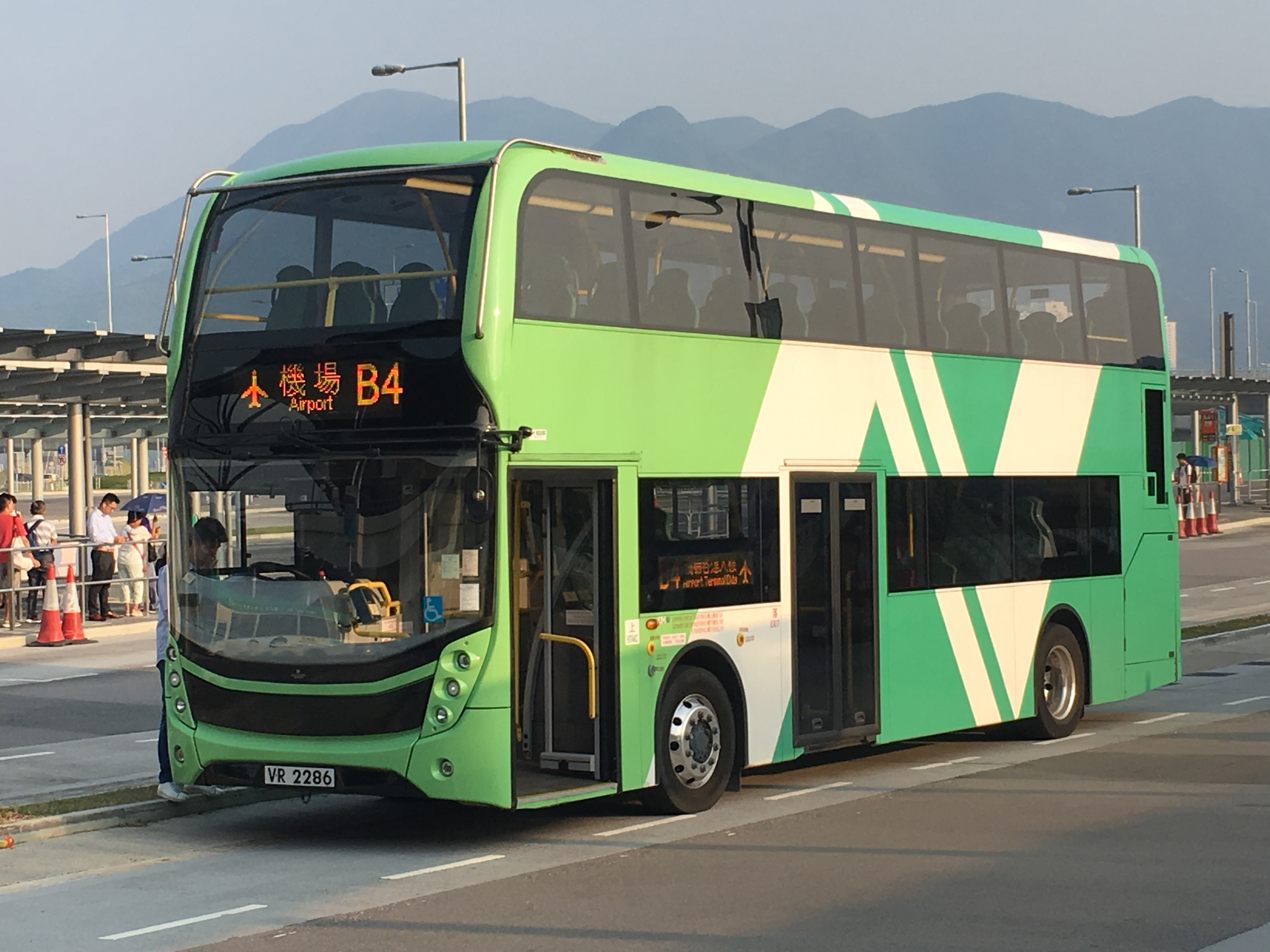
New Lantao Bus Enviro400 with facelift Enviro400 MMC bodywork

Compared to the more predominant Alexander Dennis Enviro500, a small number of air-conditioned Enviro400s were exported to bus operators in Hong Kong following demonstration trials with the operators.

The first operators of Enviro400s in Hong Kong were Citybus, who after trialling two Enviro400 demonstrators developed for the Hong Kong market in 2009, took delivery of 38 Enviro400s in 2011, which were then followed by an additional 20 in 2013.

Kowloon Motor Bus, after trialling one Enviro400 demonstrator, also took delivery of 50 Enviro400s between 2012 and 2013, which were followed by the MTR Corporation taking delivery of nine Enviro400s for MTR Bus services in 2012; an additional two Enviro400s were delivered in 2018.

New World First Bus took delivery of 60 low-height Enviro400s with Enviro400 MMC facelift bodies between 2016 and 2017, while fellow NWS Holdings subsidiary New Lantao Bus also took delivery of 14 similar low-height Enviro400s, which began entering service from October 2018.

=== North America ===
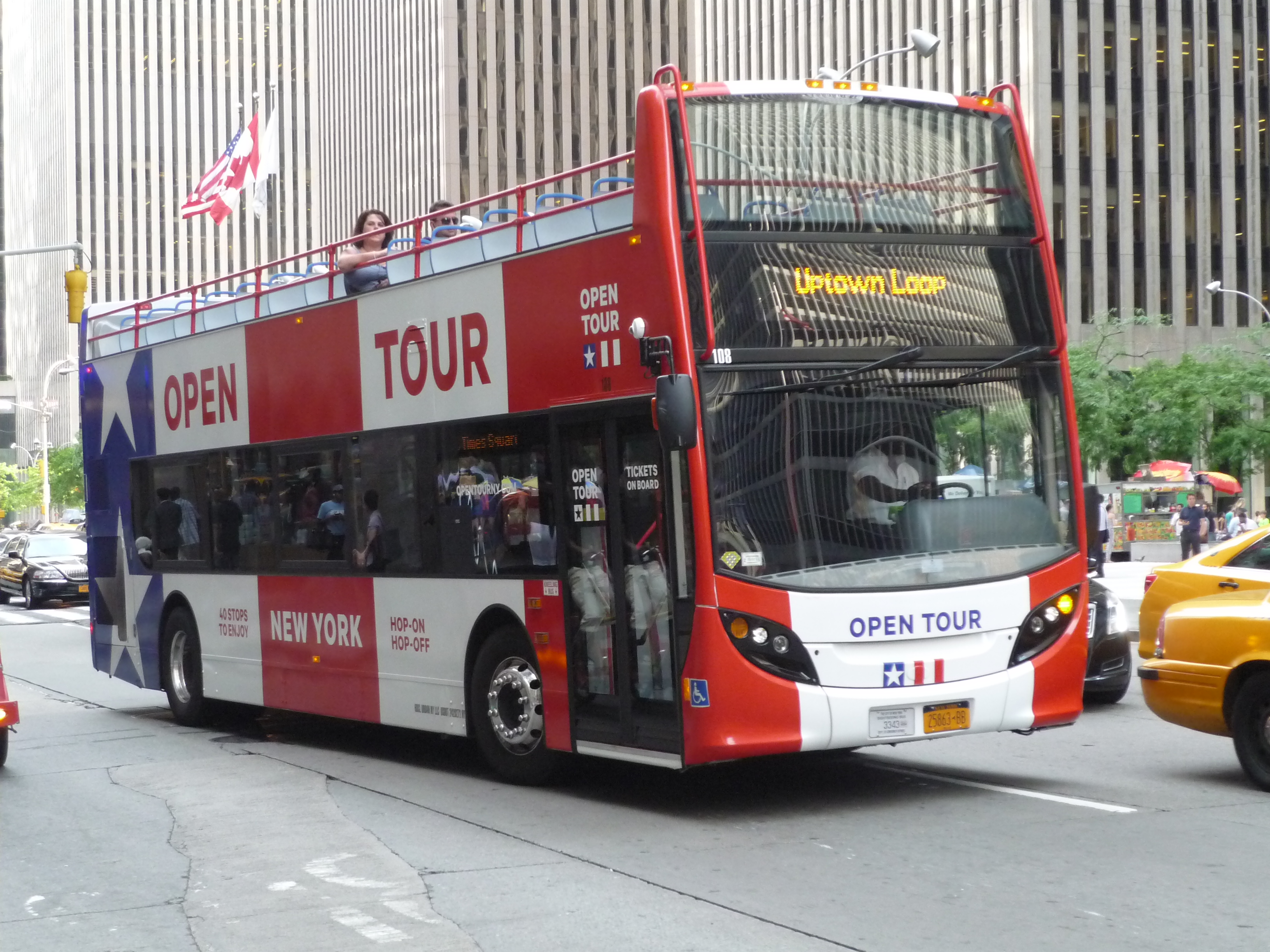
Open Loop New York Enviro400 open top bus in New York

The Enviro400 was introduced to North America exclusively as an open-top bus for sightseeing purposes. It is not available as a public transport vehicle, unlike the similar Alexander Dennis Enviro500.

On 11 November 2010, Alexander Dennis announced it had received an order for 10 Enviro400s from Coach USA subsidiary Twin America, in New York.

== See also ==
- List of buses
- Spirit of London, an Enviro400 built to replace the bus destroyed in the 7 July 2005 London bombings.
