= Stagecoach Midlands =

Bus operator in the English Midlands

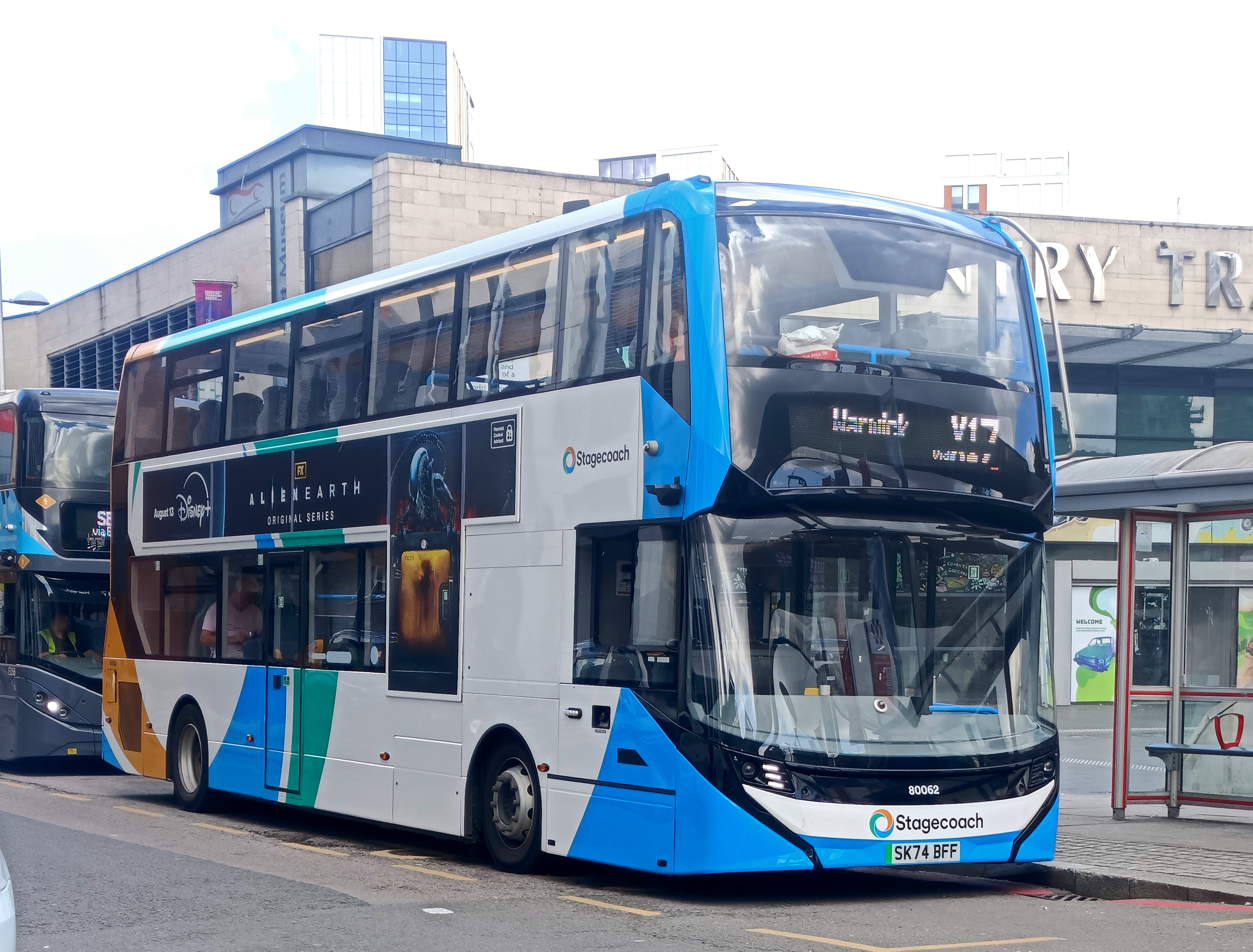
- Alexander Dennis Enviro400EV in Coventry city centre in September 2025
- Parent: Stagecoach Group
- Founded: July 2010; 16 years ago
- Headquarters: Northampton
- Service area: Northamptonshire, Warwickshire, Leicestershire, Milton Keynes, Birmingham
- Service type: Bus service
- Stops: 100+
- Fleet: 323 (June 2024)
- Website: Official website

Stagecoach Midlands is a bus operator providing local and regional services across the Midlands region of England. It operates in the counties of Northamptonshire, Warwickshire and the West Midlands. The company is a subsidiary of the Stagecoach Group and is headquartered in Northampton.

== History ==
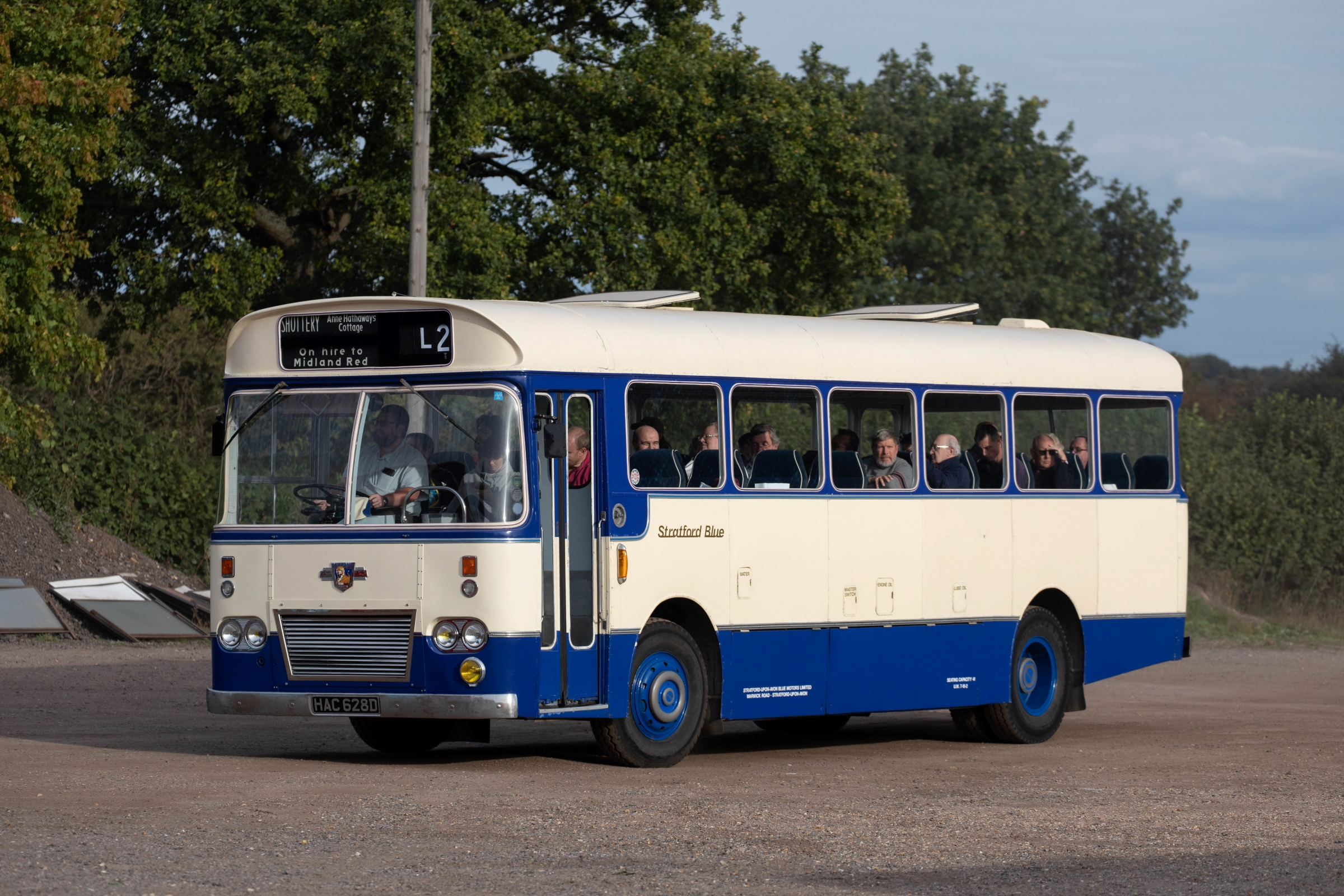
Preserved Stratford Blue Marshall bodied Leyland Leopard at Showbus 2022

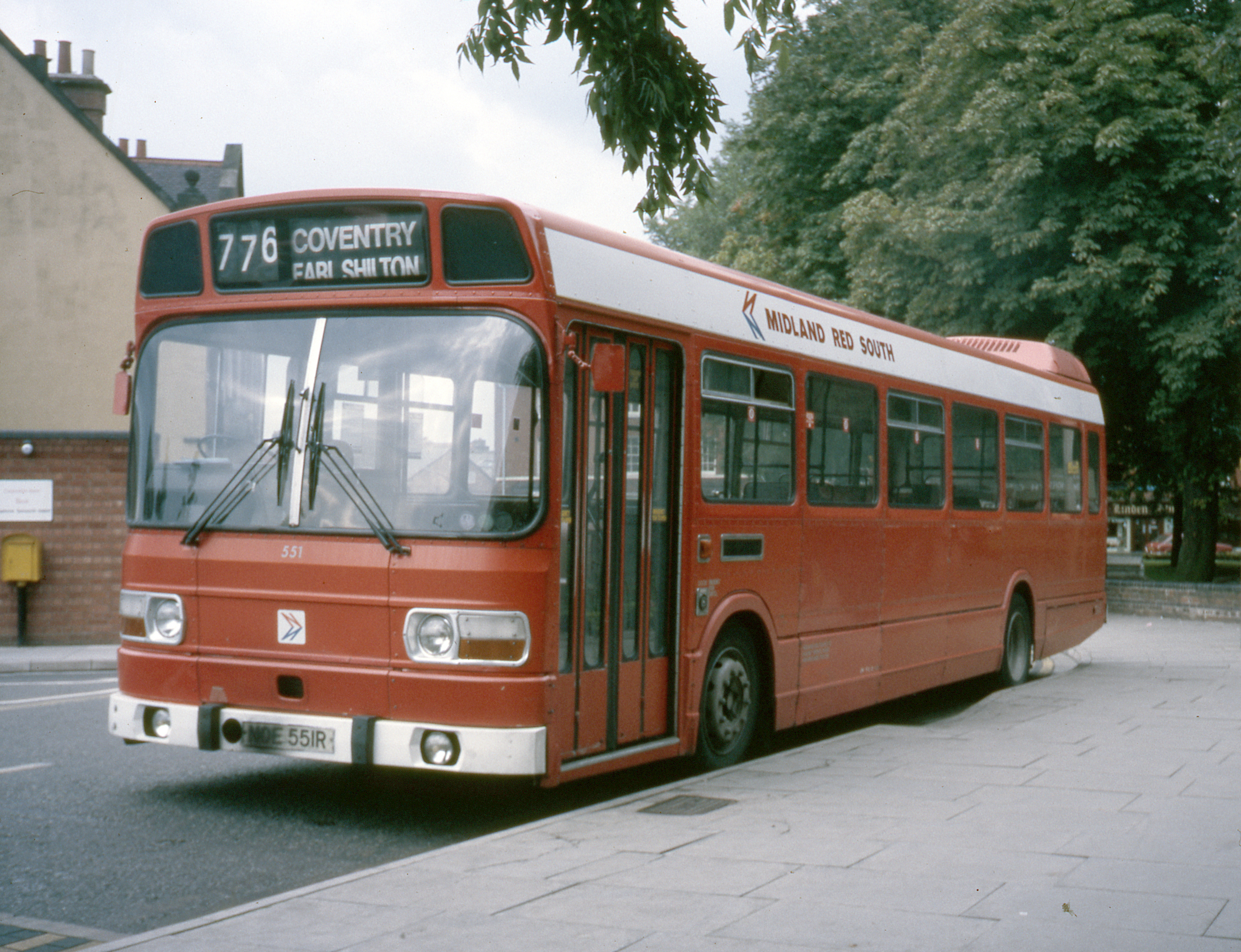
NBC Midland Red South Leyland National in Tamworth in 1986

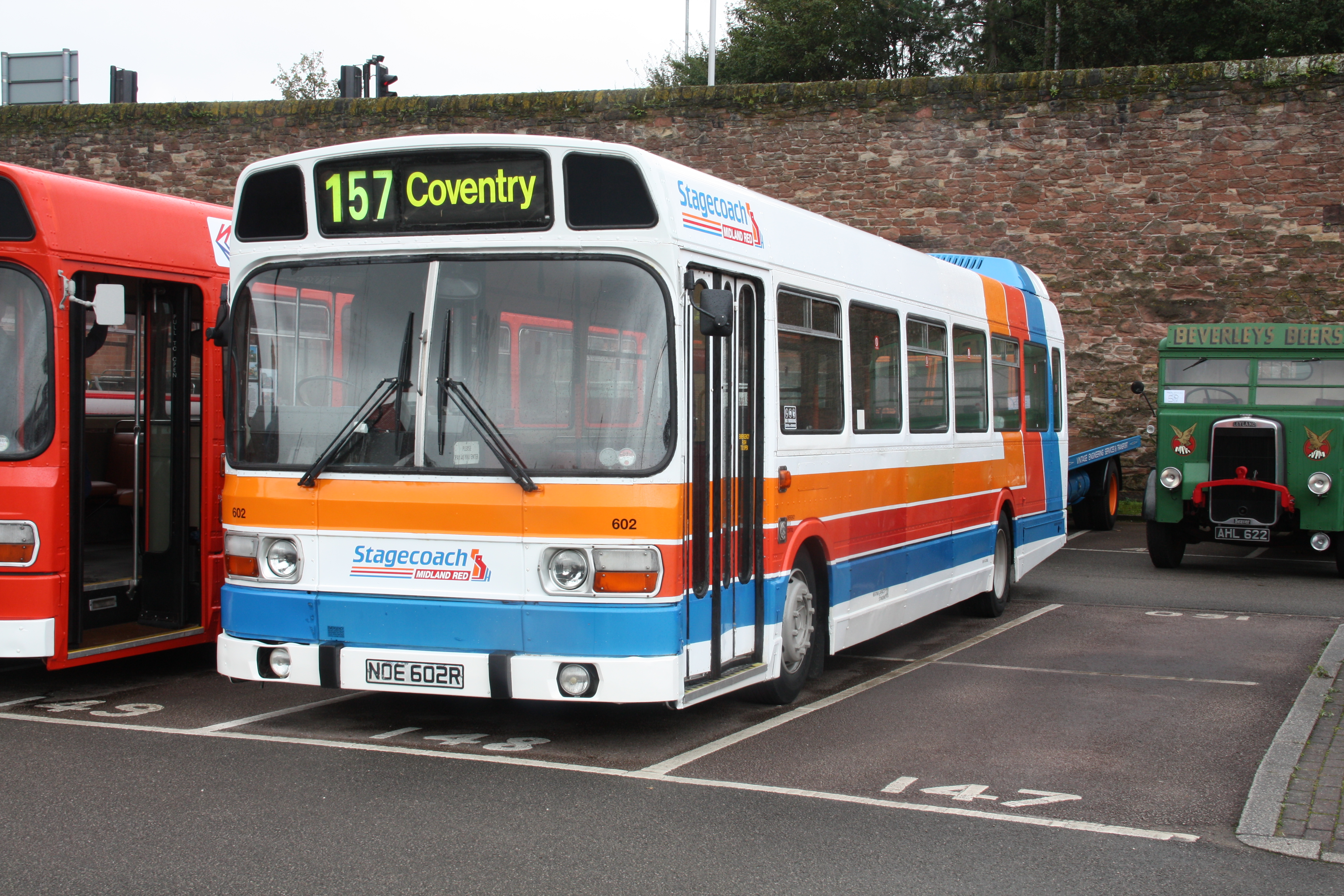
Preserved Stagecoach Midland Red Leyland National at the Wirral Transport Museum in October 2019

Stagecoach Midlands can trace its origins back to April 1927, when Stratford-on-Avon Motor Services was founded with a single blue-liveried 14-seat Chevrolet LM bus. Later that year, amid expansions to its operating area, the company began operating a service between Stratford-on-Avon and Royal Leamington Spa. In 1931, Stratford-on-Avon Motor Services was acquired by Balfour Beatty, where as a subsidiary of the company's Midland General operation, it became Stratford-upon-Avon Blue Motors Limited, operating under the trading name og Stratford Blue.

In June 1935, British Electric Traction (BET) subsidiary Midland Red purchased both Stratford Blue and the Leamington Green Bus Company from Balfour Beatty. Stratford Blue was kept separate from the main Midland Red operation and continued to operate as an independent subsidiary, surviving into Midland Red becoming the largest bus operator within the National Bus Company (NBC) on 1 January 1969, following the passing of the Transport Act 1968 which merged the government-owned Transport Holding Company with the BET. However, in January 1971, the NBC merged the Stratford Blue operation into Midland Red's southern division as part of a cost-saving rationalisation of some of the NBC's operations' subsidiaries.

Midland Red was split by the NBC into five separate companies on 1 September 1981, with Midland Red South, headquartered in Rugby, formed with a fleet of 163 buses operating from five depots in the counties of Buckinghamshire, Northamptonshire, Oxfordshire and Warwickshire. Some administrative assistance was provided to the new company by neighbouring NBC operator United Counties. Prior to deregulation and the ensuing break-up of the National Bus Company, Midland Red South were threatened in 1984 with competition in Stratford-upon-Avon by The Best of British (Travel UK) Ltd, which traded as Shakespeare Country Bus Services. The operator aimed to operate an hourly service from the Dove House Farm estate into Stratford town centre, as well as a town service within Stratford, which were both to compete with Midland Red South's existing network. However, the registration of these services was strongly opposed by the Traffic Commissioners for the West Midlands following the appeals of Midland Red South, David R. Grasby Coach Hire, Warwickshire County Council and Wellesbourne Parish Council.

Following deregulation on 26 October 1986, in December 1987, Midland Red South was sold by the National Bus Company in a management buyout to the Western Travel Group, the holding company of former NBC operator Cheltenham & Gloucester Omnibus. During Western Travel ownership, Midland Red South opened a garage in Coventry and also revived the Stratford Blue name, and following the acquisition of Bedworth coach operator Vanguard Coaches in September 1989, began operating its first minibus services in Coventry in competition with West Midlands Travel, using a fleet of eleven Ford Transits based at Vanguard's depot.

Midland Red South was included in the sale of Western Travel to Stagecoach in November 1993 for £9.25 million (equivalent to £19,906,000 in 2025). Stagecoach re-branded part of the company as Stagecoach Midland Red, adopting the company's national livery scheme, and set about simplifying the routes and improving the profitability of the operation, which included the closure of the depots in Coventry and Stratford in 1999. Upon the national rebranding of the Stagecoach Group in November 2000, Stagecoach Midland Red became Stagecoach in Warwickshire for operations from Leamington Spa, Nuneaton and Rugby and Stagecoach in Banbury for operations in Banbury. For a long time, Midland Red shared a management team with Stagecoach Oxford, but this was split in July 2002 with the Banbury operations becoming part of Stagecoach in Oxfordshire.

Meanwhile, Guide Friday, a nationwide operator of open-top sightseeing bus tours which ran such services in Stratford, had established a small number of local and tendered bus services in the town following Stagecoach's closure of Stratford depot. Guide Friday was eventually purchased by Ensignbus, who rebranded the Stratford services by once again reviving the Stratford Blue fleetname. In February 2007, Stagecoach in Warwickshire purchased the Stratford operation from Ensignbus, once again giving them a depot in the town.

In 2010, Stagecoach in Warwickshire merged with Stagecoach East and Stagecoach in Northants to create Stagecoach Midlands. The Warwickshire headquarters was moved from Rugby to Northampton after a management restructure. However, the legal name for the Warwickshire operations remained as Midland Red (South) Ltd. with the other Stagecoach Midlands operations in Banbury maintained the historic legal name of United Counties Omnibus Company Ltd. until 2021, when Banbury's operations were moved under the Midland Red (South) licence.

In December 2022, Stagecoach Midlands became a Transport for West Midlands contractor, taking on three former National Express West Midlands routes in Acocks Green, Chelmsley Wood, Kings Heath and Sutton Coldfield from 1 January 2023. The contract gain marked the first time the Stagecoach Group operated regular bus services in Birmingham for many years. As of November 2025, none remain.

== Operations ==
=== Gold network ===
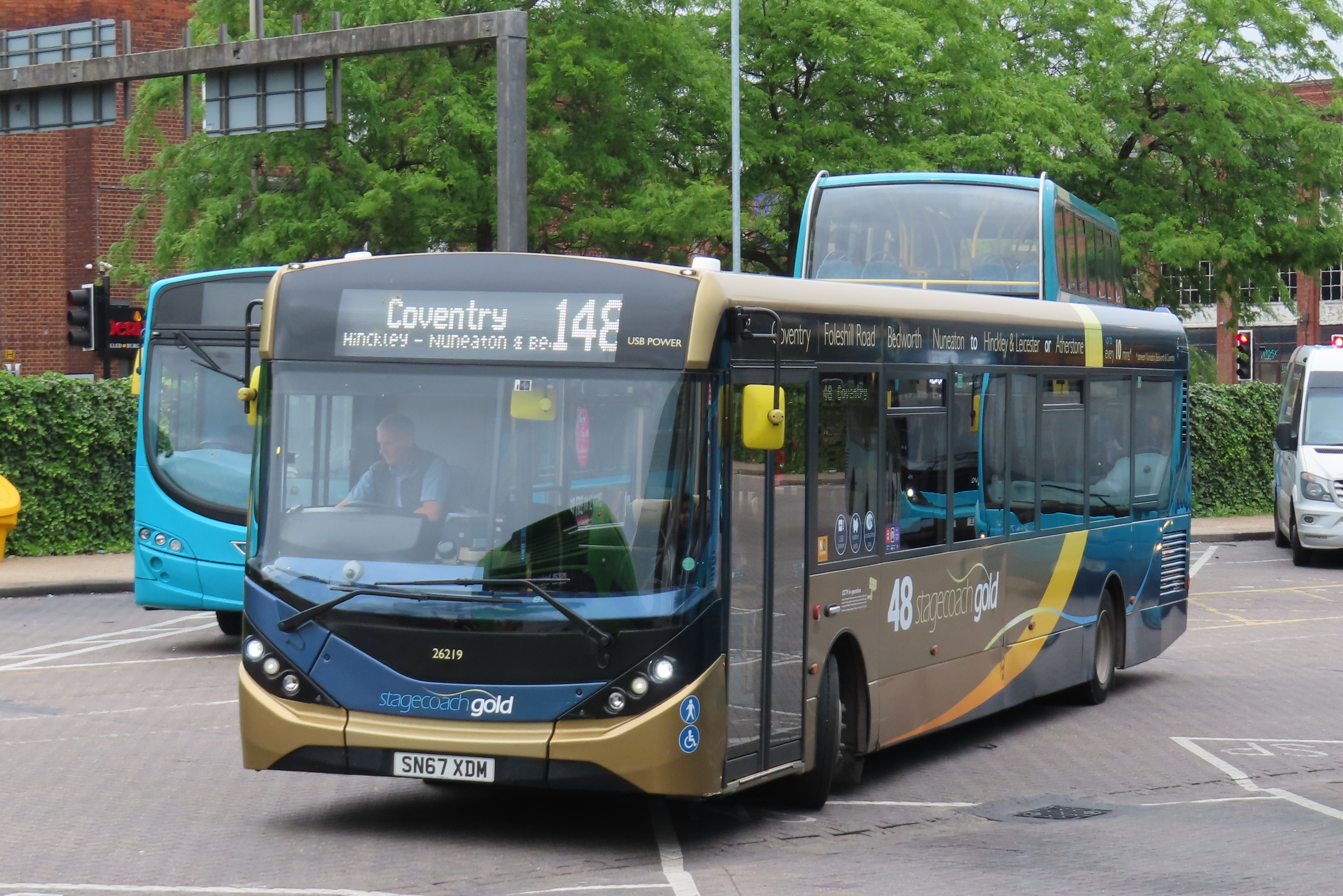
Stagecoach Gold Alexander Dennis Enviro200 MMC operating service 148 in Leicester in May 2024

As of December 2022, Stagecoach Midlands operates Stagecoach Gold services 148, X4 and services X46 and X47.

Stagecoach Midlands was one of two Stagecoach Group operations, the other being Stagecoach West Scotland, which would be the first to launch a Stagecoach Gold (then branded 'Goldline') high-specification express bus service. The 'Goldline' G1 service from Warwick to South Farm commenced operations on 12 November 2007 following the launch of a fleet of 11 Optare Solo midibuses by Stagecoach Group chief executive Brian Souter. The route operated at a frequency of around every 10 minutes Monday to Saturday during the day, running every half-hour on evenings and on Sundays. From mid-2015, the G1's fleet was replaced with 14 new Optare Solo SRs, featuring a new livery to reflect the revised 'Gold' branding. Service G1 would eventually lose its Gold branding and vehicles from 5 January 2019, renumbered to service 1 as part of wide-ranging service changes across the Stagecoach Midlands network.

Service 48 between Coventry and Nuneaton via Bedworth was originally launched in 2000 as part of Coventry City Council's PrimeLines scheme, operating using a fleet of Alexander ALX200 bodied Dennis Dart SLF single-deck buses bought new for the service. After the PrimeLines branding had been dropped, service 48 became part of the Stagecoach Gold network in February 2018 with the delivery of a fleet of Gold specification Alexander Dennis Enviro200 MMCs.

During 2020, the 48 service was split into 3 different routes, with the Nuneaton to Atherstone segment becoming the 48A, the main Coventry to Nuneaton service becoming the 48C, and the Nuneaton to Leicester service becoming the 48L. In March 2023, services 48C and 48L were merged back together with funding from the Warwickshire Enhanced Bus Partnership to form the 148 service, serving Coventry and Leicester. The 148 reused the same Gold-specification Enviro200 MMCs that were delivered for the original 48, until July 2025 when they were replaced by 39 Yutong E12 buses.

Service X4 was launched in 2000 as a Stagecoach Express service named "Cross Country", sharing the name with Stagecoach East's X5 service, which the X4 once connected with at Milton Keynes. The X4 became a Stagecoach Gold route in November 2011 with the delivery of 13 Alexander Dennis Enviro400 bodied Scania N230UD double-decker buses. Running from Peterborough to Milton Keynes via Kettering, the X4 was formerly the longest bus route in Northamptonshire, however from May 2018, the X4 was shortened to run only between Northampton and Peterborough via Corby, with the Milton Keynes section dropped in favour of the X7 service to Leicester; this route would itself be replaced by the X6 service in July 2019.

Services X46 and X47 are also Stagecoach Gold services, serving Northampton and Raunds, via Wellingborough, Rushden and Higham Ferrers. The services formerly travelled further to Thrapston, though this part of the route was dropped due to low passenger numbers.

=== Unibus ===
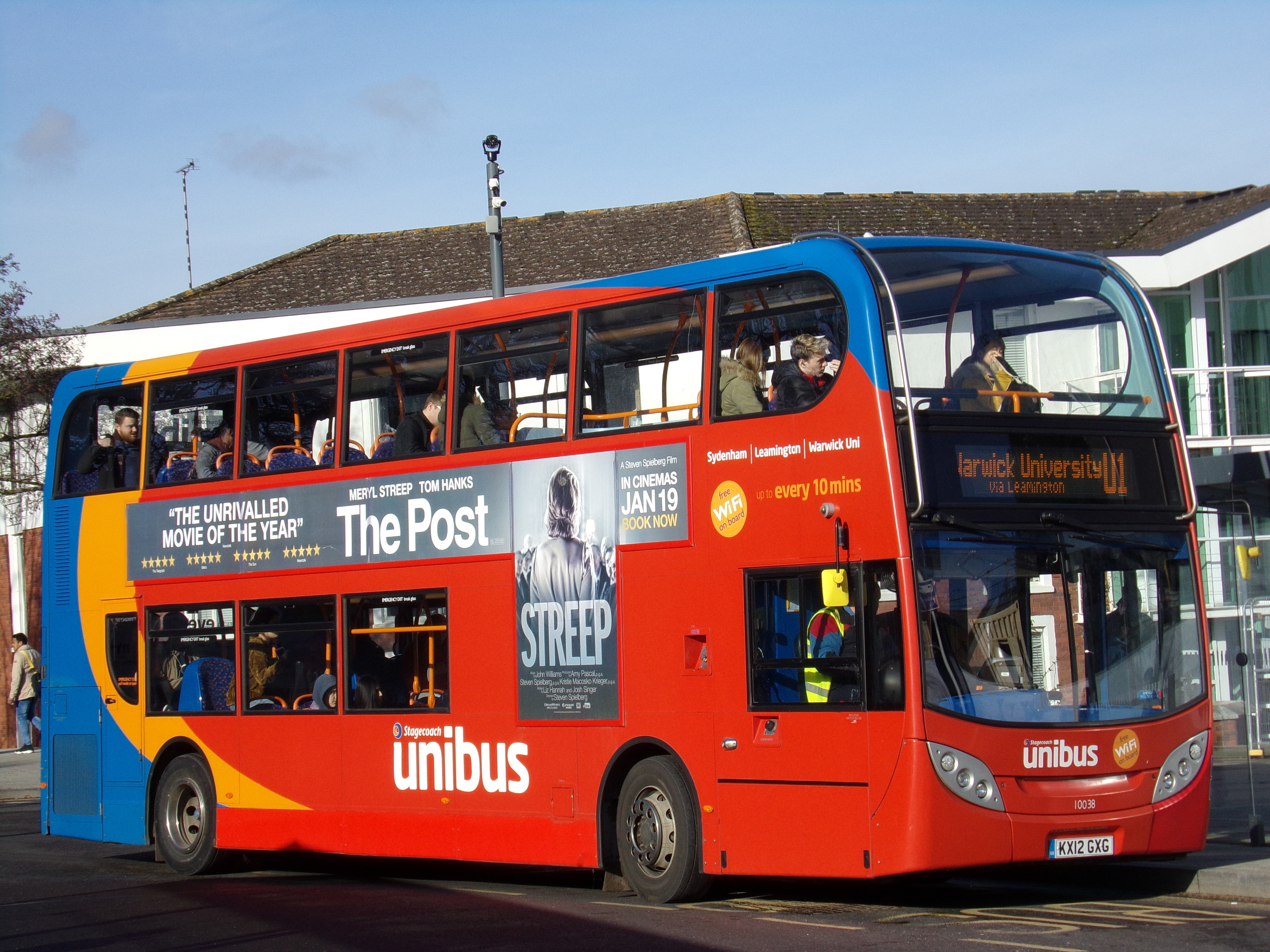
Alexander Dennis Enviro400 in former Unibus livery in January 2018

The Unibus brand is used for services U1, U2, U12 and U17, operating predominantly between Leamington Spa and the University of Warwick, via the A46, although weekend variations of the routes take services away from the A46. From its launch in 2005, the service used specially branded Alexander bodied Volvo Olympians; however, in October 2012, these were replaced with a fleet of ten new Alexander Dennis Enviro400s, coinciding with services being increased in frequency to cope with rising student demand. These buses were complemented with part of an order of eight Alexander Dennis Enviro400 MMCs in conventional fleet livery in November 2016.

Following an investment in 17 Enviro400 MMCs featuring revised Unibus branding in late 2019, replacing the Enviro400s on the service, Stagecoach Midlands launched the U12 service on 2 January 2020, which runs between Coventry and the University of Warwick at a frequency of up to every 15 minutes, as well as launching a term-long bus pass for £99. The route and bus pass operated in direct competition with National Express Coventry's 11, 11U and 12X services, which operated every 10 to 15 minutes with a fleet of similar-specification Enviro400 MMCs delivered during 2019, as well as their £125.90 term-long bus pass.

=== Discontinued brands ===
==== Corby Star ====
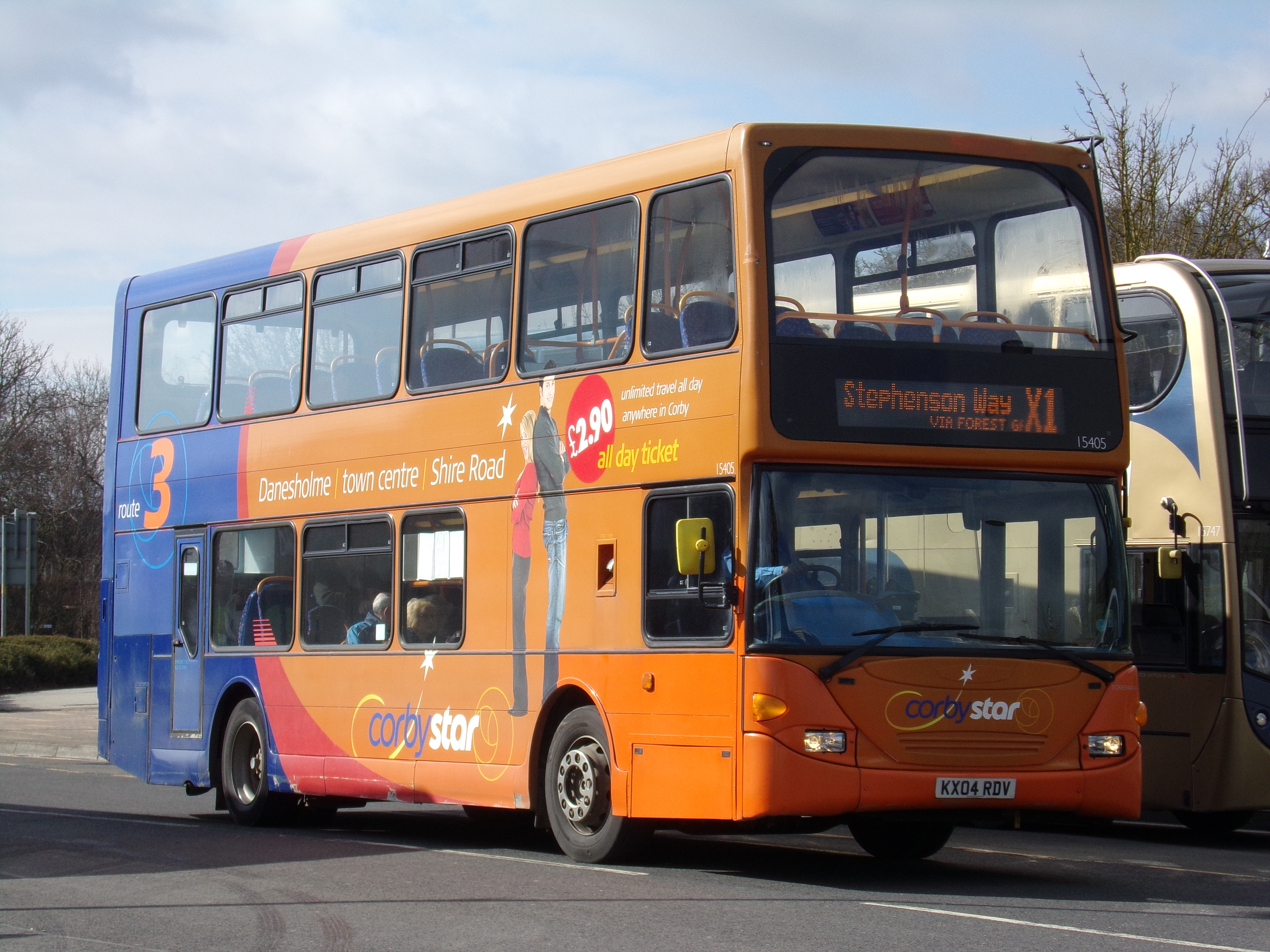
Corby Star-branded East Lancs OmniDekka bodied Scania N94UD in March 2018

Corby Star was the brand name for a network of bus services operating within the town of Corby, in Northamptonshire. Bus services based at the town's depot ran to all estates in Corby, with opportunities provided for passengers to transfer onto the X4 service, using a fleet of orange, red and blue-branded buses. The Corby Star was unique within the Stagecoach Group due to the purchase of five East Lancs OmniDekka bodied Scania N94UD double-deckers for use on the network, a body and chassis combination which the group did not ordinarily purchase.

From 2018, however, the Corby depot was reduced to being an outstation for only local bus services, with the main intertown services being transferred to Kettering depot. Buses painted in Corby Star livery would slowly begin to be painted into standard fleet livery following this transfer of services.

== Incidents ==
Stagecoach Midlands was fined £2.3 million in December 2018, and later had its vehicle authorisation cut from 227 to 200 for 28 days in March 2019, by the West Midlands Traffic Commissioner for violating health and safety laws: on 3 October 2015, bus driver Kailash Chander mistook the brake pedal of his Dennis Trident 2 double-decker bus for the accelerator, hitting a parked bus on Trinity Street in Coventry and driving across a grass verge before the bus accelerated down the street and crashed into a Sainsbury's branch. 76-year-old pedestrian Dora Hancox and 7-year-old top-deck bus passenger Rowan Fitzgerald were pronounced dead on scene while other passengers suffered serious injuries. Chander, aged 77 at the time, was found to have worked over 60 hours per week and had previously been warned by Stagecoach bosses after four bus crashes three years beforehand, however he had been allowed to continue driving buses with the company; he was diagnosed with dementia following the crash and was found unfit to stand trial before the Traffic Commissioner.

== Fleet ==
As of June 2024, Stagecoach Midlands operates 323 buses from seven depots and outstations in Corby, Kettering, Leamington Spa, Nuneaton, Northampton, Rugby and Stratford-upon-Avon.
