= Stagecoach Gold bus route X4 =

Bus route in England

X4
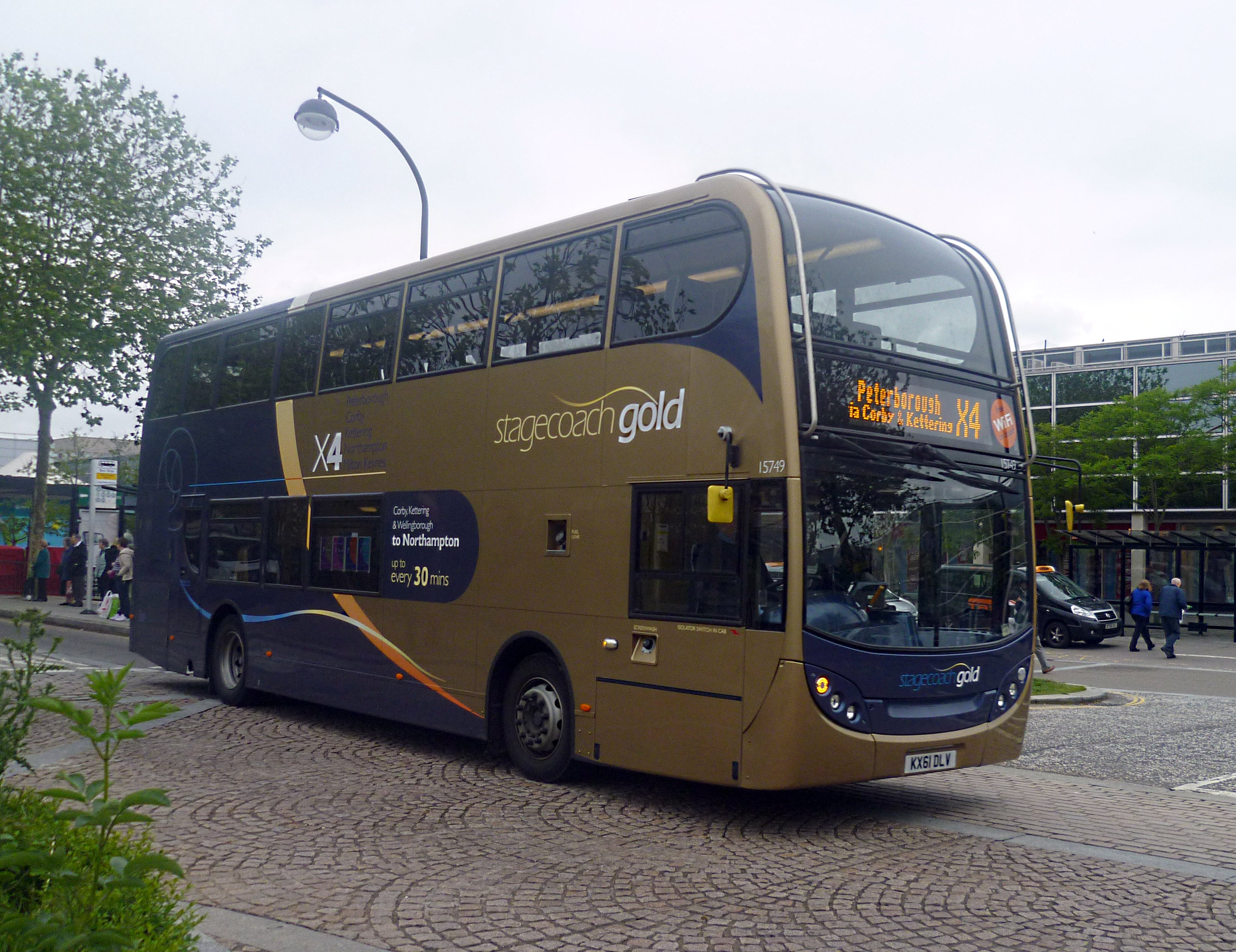
- Stagecoach Midlands Alexander Dennis Enviro400 bodied Scania N230UD in Milton Keynes in June 2012

Overview
- Operator: Stagecoach Midlands
- Garage: Kettering

Route
- Start: Northampton
- Via: Wellingborough; Kettering; Corby; Oundle
- End: Peterborough
- Length: 50 miles (70 km) approximately

Service
- Frequency: 30 minutes (Northampton to Corby) Every hour (Northampton - Corby - Peterborough)
- Operates: Daily

Stagecoach Gold bus route X4 is a bus route in England that links Northampton and Peterborough via Wellingborough, Kettering and Corby. This service is operated by the Stagecoach Midlands bus company.

== Route ==
This route was launched on May 28, 2000 as a Stagecoach Express service between Northampton and Peterborough. In April 2004, the route extended from Northampton through to Milton Keynes. Over the years, the X4 route has linked the main towns of the county of Northamptonshire with Milton Keynes and Peterborough enabling better east-west county public transport links than has previously been possible. From end to end, the average journey time is 3 hours and 30 minutes and the distance approximately 70 miles (110 km)

In May 2018, the service runs between Northampton and Peterborough only. Initially Stagecoach X7 ran between Northampton and Milton Keynes instead (as well as to and from Leicester), but this was also cut back leaving the X6 as the main link between the two towns.

The X4 inter-urban bus service benefited from £4.4 million ODPM Growth Area Funding between 2003 and 2006 and has seen annual passenger numbers rise from 325,000 in 2003/04 to over 500,000 in 2004/05.

=== Current route ===
- Northampton North Gate bus station
- Cliftonville for Northampton General Hospital
- Earls Barton Square
- Wellingborough Church St
- Isham Monk & Minstrel public house
- Kettering Horse Market
- Corby George Street for Willow Place Shopping Centre
- Corby railway station
- Corby Village The Jamb
  - Corby Business Academy (Certain journeys start/terminate here)
- Weldon
- Upper Benefield
- Lower Benefield
- Oundle Market Place
  - Elton Black Horse (evenings and Sundays)
  - Alwalton Lay-by (evenings and Sundays)
- Warmington
- Peterborough railway station (certain journeys)
- Peterborough Queensgate bus station

== Service ==
The service runs seven days a week. Monday to Saturday daytimes, there is a half-hourly service between Northampton and Corby with an hourly extension to Peterborough.

Evenings and Sundays there generally is a two-hourly service between Northampton and Peterborough and a two-hourly service between Northampton and Corby. An hourly frequency on the core part of the route between Northampton and Corby.

To comply with drivers’ hours regulations, the route has registered in two parts between, Northampton & Corby and Corby & Peterborough.

== Vehicles ==
In November 2011, this route became a Stagecoach Gold branded one with Stagecoach Midlands spending £1.9 million on a fleet of 13 new Scania ADL Enviro400 buses based at the Kettering depot, halfway along the route.

These buses have Lazzerini leather seats and free wireless internet

In October 2018 the fleet was replaced by 13 Alexander Dennis Enviro400 MMC buses by Alexander Dennis at a cost of £3.1million
