= PrimeLines =

Public transport scheme in Coventry, England

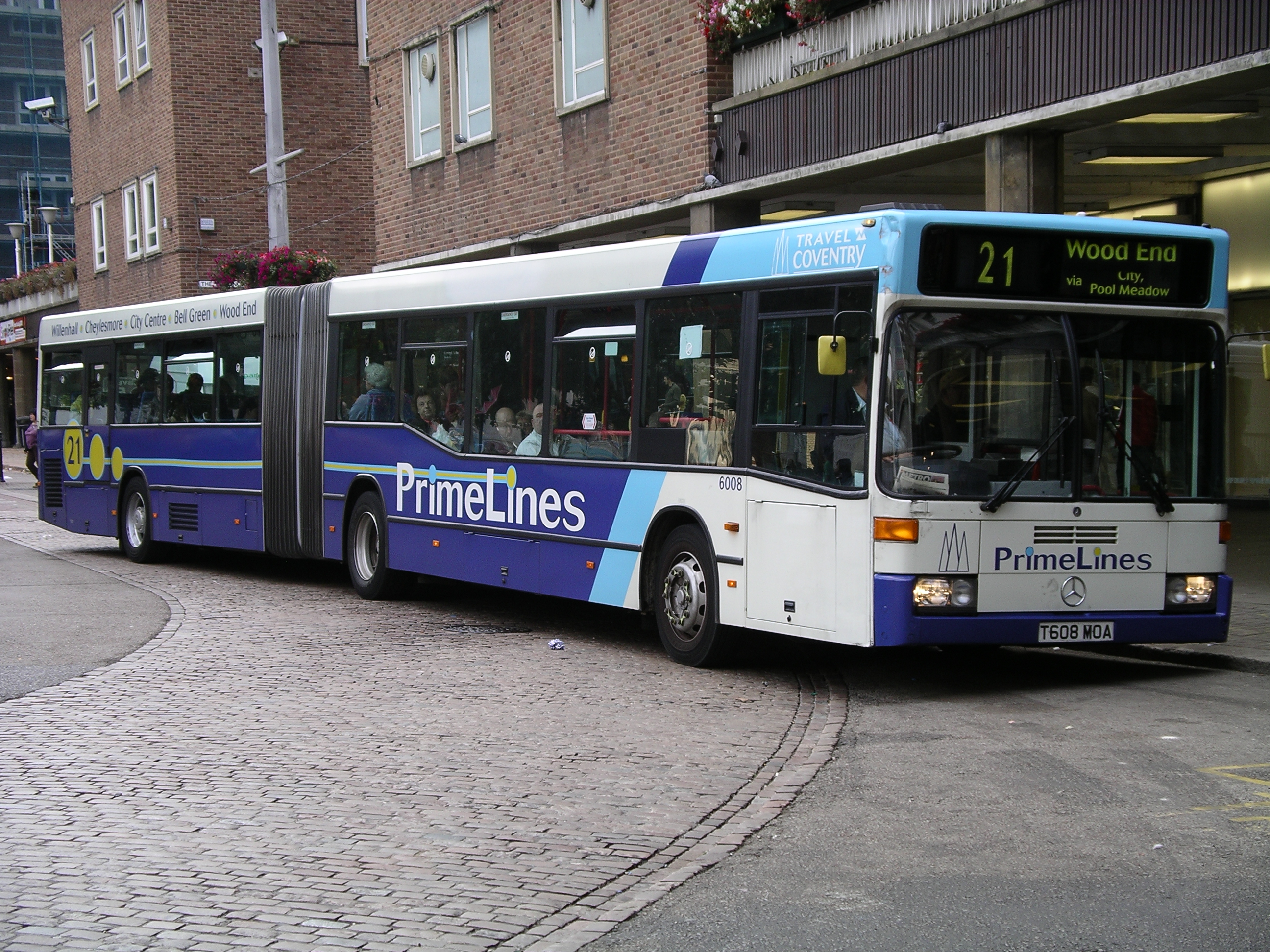
- PrimeLines liveried Mercedes-Benz O405 GN articulated single-decker in 2007
- Service area: Coventry
- Service type: Bus service

The PrimeLines initiative in Coventry, England, was a £42 million budgeted scheme which aimed at improving bus journey times, reliability, and accessibility along routes radiating out from the city centre of Coventry.

== History ==
The buses used in the project were purchased by Centro in 2003, with the funding for the project being secured in 2004. Funding of the project was split between the Department for Transport (£28.5 million), West Midlands Passenger Transport Executive (AKA Centro) block-funding (£5.75 million), and National Express (£7.25 million).

The decision to go ahead with the construction of bus lanes for the project was taken in November 2007, though part of the original plan (the construction of a bus lane that would have extended into Hearsall Common) was scrapped due to public protest. The decision had originally been scheduled to be taken in October 2009 but was delayed due to the need to give more time for public feedback given the volume of objections.

Launched fully in 2009, the project involved the provision of digital signage, segregated bus-lanes, and a fleet of low-floor bendy busses focused on six routes ("Prime Lines") between Coventry and various locations on its outskirts, including Warwick University. The scheme involved setting up 5.3km of bus lane as well as 4.9km of restricted lanes, and installing vehicle location tracking technology on all of Coventry's 156 busses. Tracking of the buses was achieved through the use of lamppost-mounted sensors connected via fibre-optics. The scheme also involved installation of systems that gave buses priority at traffic lights along the route.

In 2010 the scheme was extended along the route between Holbrooks and Coventry city centre. Centro claimed this reduced travel time between the town centre and Holbrooks by about 5 minutes. The cost of this was £2.3 million.

According to a survey published in 2012, 47% of Coventry households had changed their travel habits, 39% reduced the average distance travelled through Coventry. Of this 47%, 24% achieved this reduction by switching to buses.

In 2016 the head of Coventry city council proposed the phasing out of the bus-lanes established under the project in order to ease congestion within the city. An experimental closure of the lanes, returning them to ordinary use, began the same year. The experimental scheme involved the closure of seven of Coventry's 22 lanes and ran for six months. In 2017 the scheme was extended and further five further lane-closures were announced. In 2018 the scheme was extended again and nine further lanes were suspended or scrapped. The Bendy buses obtained for the project were also finally phased out in that year.

== Reception ==
In November 2009 the scheme won the national-level UK Bus Award for Infrastructure and the RTIG Inform Award for Innovation.

== See also ==
- National Express Coventry
- West Midlands Passenger Transport Executive
