= Open Loop New York =

- Parent: RATP Group
- Founded: May 14, 2014
- Ceased operation: 2017
- Headquarters: New York City
- Service area: New York City
- Service type: Open top bus tours
- Depots: 1
- Fleet: 36
- Website: www.openloop-ny.com

Open Loop New York was a hop on hop off, open top double-decker bus, sightseeing tour company based in New York City. It was a subsidiary of the RATP Group.

== History ==
Open Tour New York commenced operating on May 14, 2014, with 15 open top buses. As part of a global rebranding, it was renamed Open Loop New York on September 3, 2014. It ceased operations in 2017 with operations incorporated into those of Big Bus Tours.

== Operations ==
Open Loop New York operated four routes: The Uptown, Downtown, Night and Midtown Route, each with stops at tourist destinations, including: Times Square, SoHo, Manhattan, Central Park, Empire State Building, Little Italy, Brooklyn, United Nations, Greenwich Village, Columbus Circle, Harlem, Washington Square Park and Bryant Park.

Open Loop New York also operated New York sightseeing tour packages that include Helicopter tours, the Ripley's Believe it or Not Museum, Statue of Liberty cruises and the Metropolitan Museum of Art.

== Fleet ==
Year	Photos	Manufacturer	Model	Fleet numbers	Engine	Transmission
2014		ADL	Enviro400	101-115	Cummins ISL9	Voith D864.5
		Gillig	Low Floor	116-130		
2016		ADL	Enviro400	131-134	Cummins ISL9	Voith D864.5
2017		ADL	Enviro400	135-138	Cummins L9	Voith D864.5
