= West Midlands Bus =

Bus operator in the West Midlands of England

- Parent: Mobico Group
- Founded: 1 November 2026
- Headquarters: Birmingham, England
- Service area: Birmingham; Coventry; Wolverhampton
- Depots: 9
- Fleet: 1,400 (November 2026}
- Website: www.westmidlandsbus.co.uk

West Midlands Bus is bus company in the West Midlands, England founded in November 2026 to take over the assets of National Express Coventry and National Express West Midlands. In December 2026 it will be sold by the Mobico Group to Transport for West Midlands.

== History ==
In January 2025, the West Midlands Combined Authority (WMCA) launched a consultation to investigate the possibility of it taking over the operation of bus services in the West Midlands pursuant to the Bus Services Act 2017.

In May 2025, it was announced that the West Midlands bus network would be brought under public control with Transport for West Midlands becoming responsible for setting the fares and timetables, and contracting out service provision to private operators. Nine franchise areas will be established with services with the first areas to be contracted out in October 2027. West Midlands Bus will not bid for any franchises.

In August 2026, the WMCA agreed terms with the Mobico Group to purchase the National Express Coventry and National Express West Midlands businesses, including all of its buses and depots.

As part of a hive down, all of the assets were transferred to a new company, West Midlands Bus Limited, on 1 November 2026. The new company will be sold by Mobico to the WCMA on 1 December 2026.

Once the franchises are awarded beginning in October 2027, the buses and depots will be leased to the new operators.

== Fleet ==
West Midlands Bus commenced operations with 1,400 former National Express Coventry and National Express West Midlands buses.

== Depots ==
West Midlands Bus operates nine depots in Acocks Green, Coventry, Digbeth, Pensnett, Perry Barr, Walsall, West Bromwich, Wolverhampton and Yardley Wood.
