= National Express Coventry =

Former Bus operator in Coventry, England

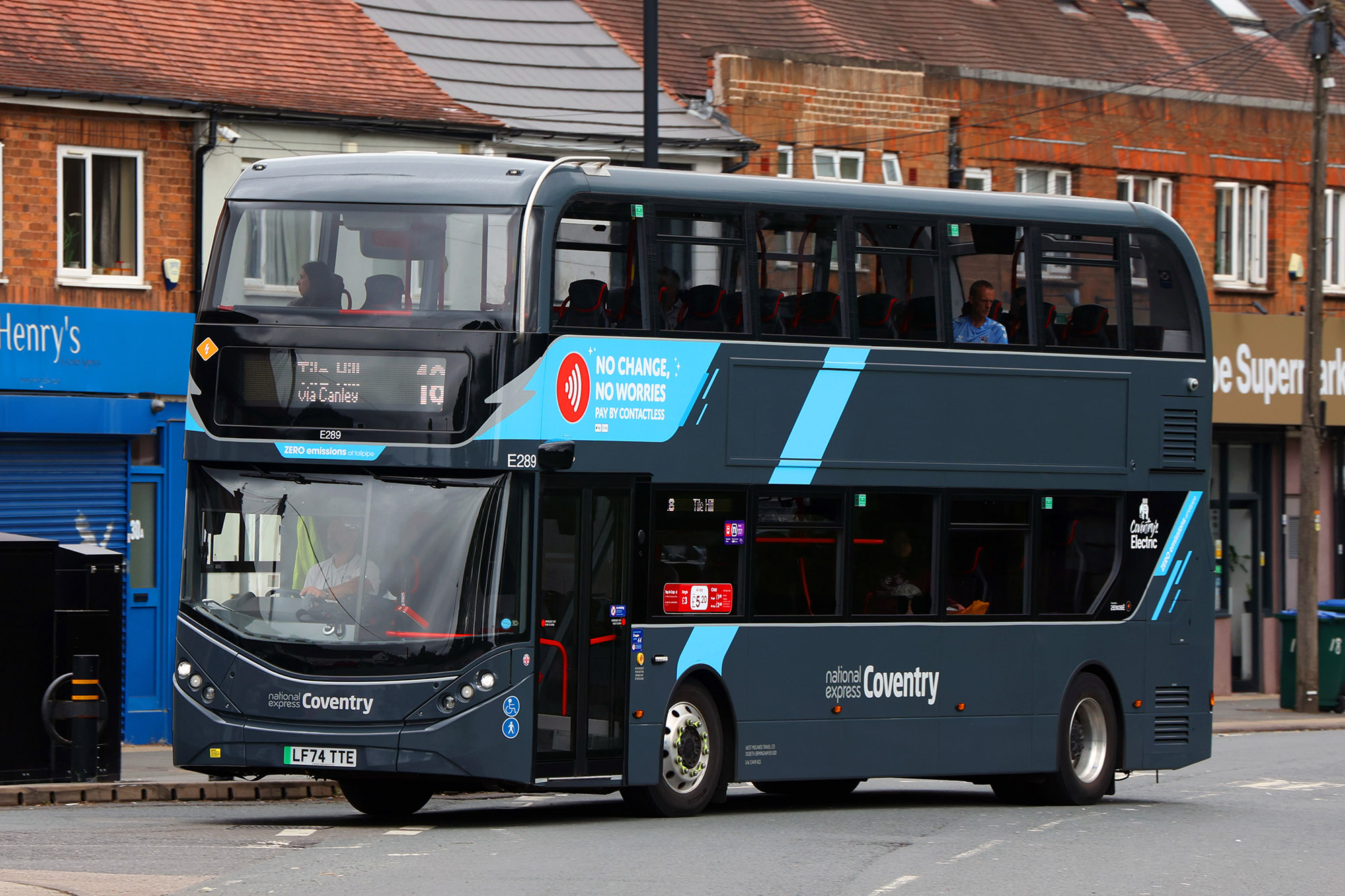
- BYD Alexander Dennis Enviro400EV in Canley in August 2025
- Parent: Mobico Group
- Founded: November 2002; 24 years ago (separated from Travel West Midlands)
- Defunct: 1 November 2026; 19 days ago (merged into West Midlands Bus Limited)
- Headquarters: Coventry, West Midlands, England
- Service area: Birmingham; Coventry; Warwickshire
- Service type: Bus services
- Alliance: National Express West Midlands
- Fleet: 176
- Operations Manager: Jamie Green
- Website: www.nxbus.co.uk/coventry

National Express Coventry was a bus operator providing local bus services in Coventry and parts of Warwickshire, England. It was a subsidiary of Mobico Group and operated under the operator’s licence of National Express West Midlands.

The company was notable for its role in Coventry’s transition to zero-emission public transport and for operating one of the largest fully electric urban bus fleets in the United Kingdom.

== History ==
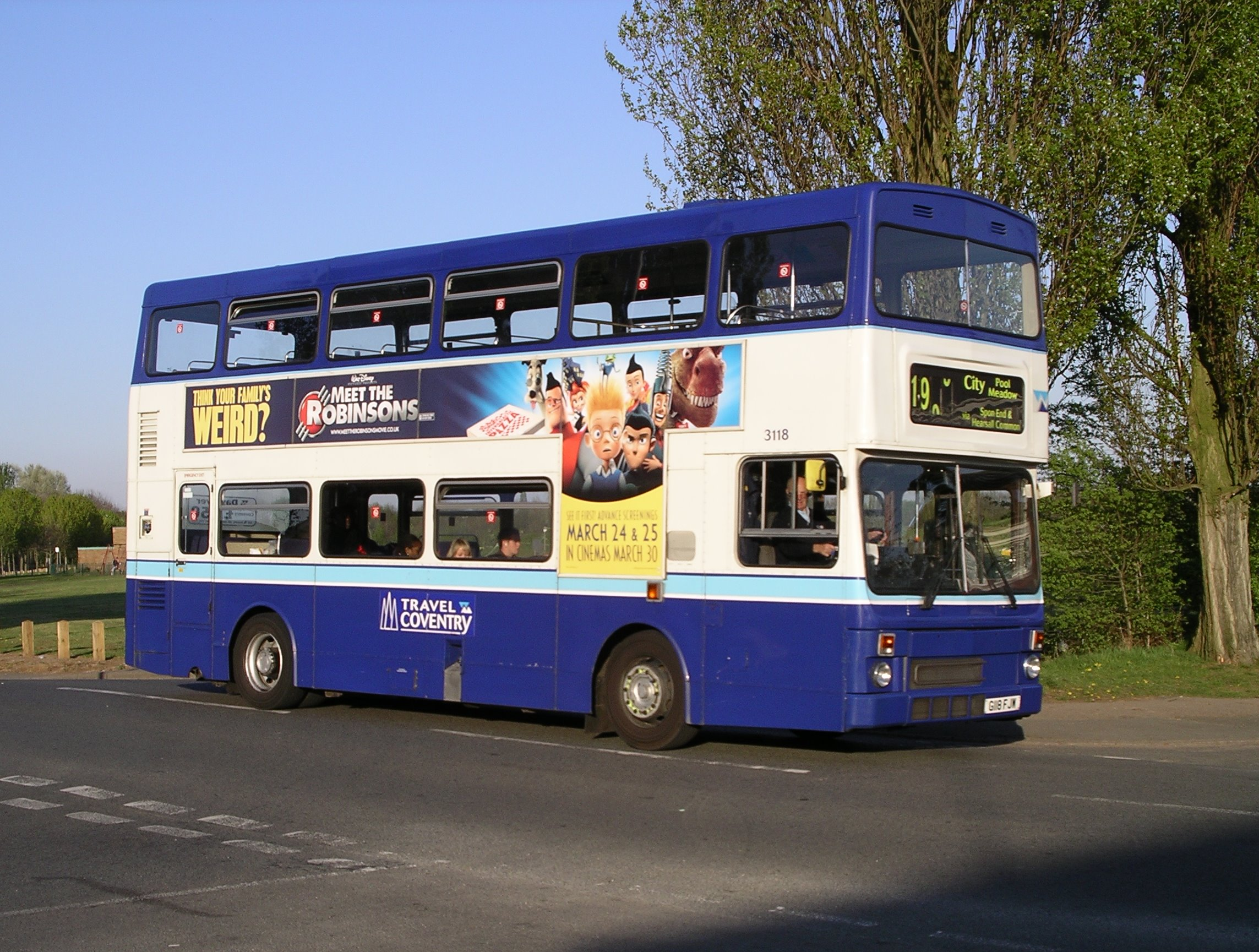
MCW Metrobus in Canley in April 2007

=== Origins and rebranding ===
In October 1986, bus operations of the West Midlands Passenger Transport Executive were separated into a new company, West Midlands Travel, as part of bus deregulation under the Transport Act 1985. West Midlands Travel was sold to National Express in April 1995 and rebranded as Travel West Midlands in September 1996.

In November 2002, the Coventry depot adopted a distinct local identity and began trading as Travel Coventry. This branding reflected a more city-focused operational and marketing approach. In February 2008, the operation was rebranded as National Express Coventry, aligning it more closely with the wider National Express bus network while retaining local management and identity.

=== Electrification ===
In August 2020, the company introduced its first battery-electric buses, taking delivery of ten Alexander Dennis Enviro400EV double-deck vehicles. These buses, along with associated charging infrastructure at the Coventry depot, were part-funded by a £2.2 million grant from the UK Government’s Ultra-Low Emission Bus Scheme.

In January 2021, the Secretary of State for Transport announced that Coventry would become one of the United Kingdom’s first all-electric bus cities. The programme was supported by £50 million in government funding administered through Transport for West Midlands.

In January 2022, National Express Coventry placed an order for a further 130 Enviro400EV buses. Deliveries began in November 2022 and were completed by September 2023, enabling the large-scale replacement of diesel vehicles. By 2024, the majority of services operated by the company were worked by zero-emission vehicles, making Coventry the first UK city with an almost entirely electric bus network with numbers from November 2025 showing there being 204 buses out of 269 buses that are zero-emissions, being 80% of most of National Express buses with 33 diesel fleet buses.

The transition resulted in significant reductions in local carbon emissions and noise pollution, and forms part of Mobico Group’s wider commitment to achieving a fully zero-emission UK bus fleet by 2030.

=== West Midlands Bus ===
In August 2026, Mobico Group announced its sale of National Express West Midlands to the West Midlands Combined Authority. A new company, West Midlands Bus, was formed taking over the operations of National Express Coventry, as well as National Express West Midlands on 1 November 2026.

== Services ==
National Express Coventry operated a comprehensive urban and suburban bus network centred on Coventry. Services extending into surrounding parts of Warwickshire, including Kenilworth, Leamington Spa, Bedworth, and Birmingham.

The network included high-frequency urban corridors, orbital services, and longer-distance inter-urban routes such as the X1 between Coventry and Birmingham.

=== 2012 network review ===
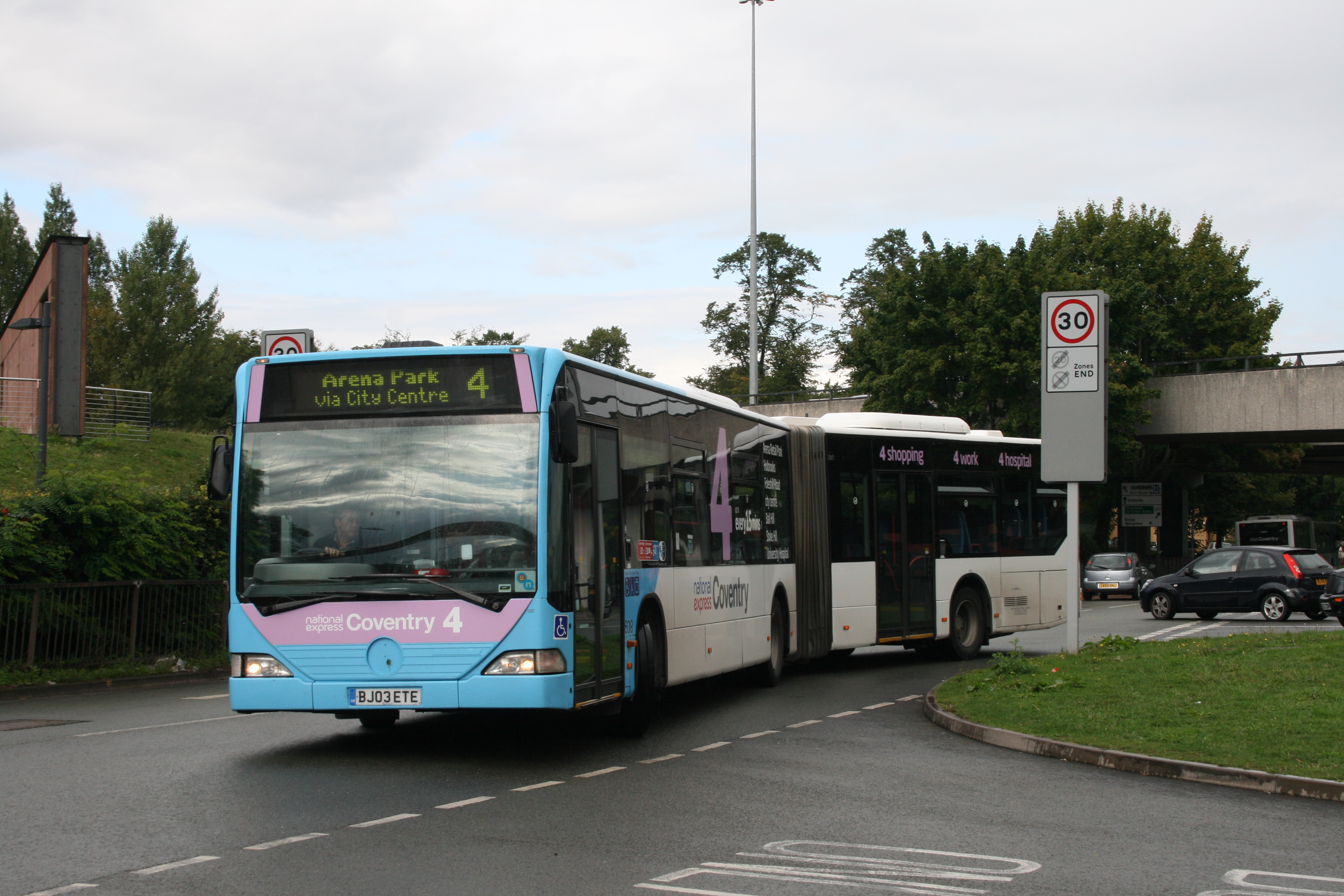
Articulated Mercedes-Benz Citaro branded for route 4 in Pool Meadow, September 2015

A major network review was implemented on 26 February 2012. The review introduced simplified route numbering, frequency improvements on core corridors, and the restructuring of several services. Some routes were withdrawn or merged, while new links were introduced to improve connectivity and operational efficiency.

The revised network was supported by a system of colour-coded route branding displayed on maps, timetables, and vehicles. Route 21 was the first to receive the new branding, followed by routes including 9, 9A, 20 and 20A during 2013. Articulated buses operating on route 4 also carried the branding until their withdrawal from service in 2018.

The branding of routes serving the southern suburbs prompted local discussion regarding the spelling of Styvechale / Stivichall, reflecting inconsistencies in historical and contemporary usage.

== Partnerships and Service Quality ==
=== PrimeLines and Voluntary Partnerships ===
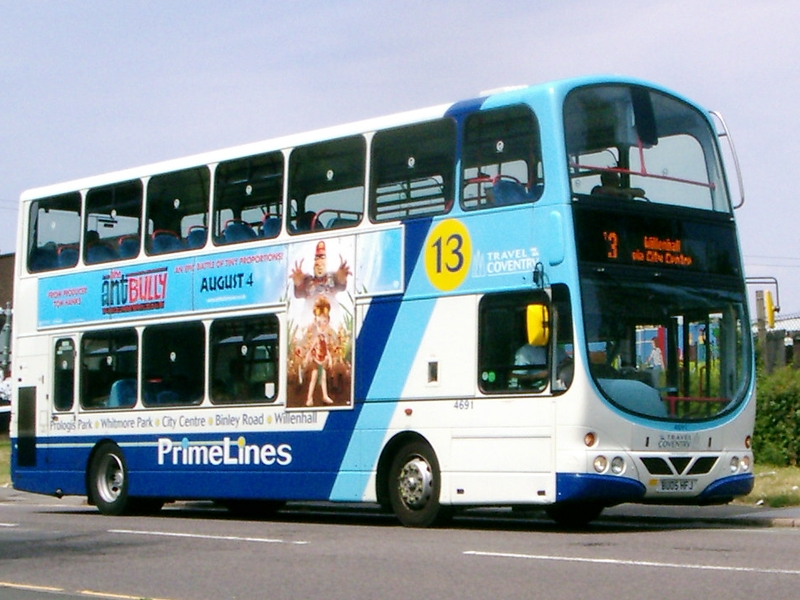
Wright Eclipse Gemini bodied Volvo B7TL with PrimeLines 13 branding in 2006

During the 2000s, National Express Coventry participated in the PrimeLines initiative, a voluntary partnership involving local bus operators, Coventry City Council, and transport authorities. PrimeLines focused on improving bus corridors through upgraded vehicles, real-time passenger information, and bus priority measures.

PrimeLines was later superseded by a citywide voluntary partnership agreement involving operators, Coventry City Council, Centro, and passenger representatives. The agreement formed part of the policy framework underpinning the 2012 network review and aimed to improve journey reliability, punctuality, and passenger comfort.

=== Passenger Charter and Safety ===
National Express Coventry operates within the West Midlands Bus Passenger’s Charter, which sets out commitments on service reliability, cleanliness, accessibility, and passenger information.

The company is a partner in the Safer Travel Partnership, working alongside local authorities and police forces to reduce crime and antisocial behaviour on public transport through joint enforcement, inspections, and public reporting schemes.

== Fares and Ticketing ==
A flat fare structure operated within the Coventry boundary, allowing travel across most city routes for a fixed price. Graduated fares applied on longer-distance services such as route 11 to Leamington Spa and the X1 service to Birmingham.

Tickets available included single fares, day tickets, and travelcards valid for one day, one week, four weeks, or one year. Payment methods include contactless bank cards, mobile ticketing via the mTicket app, Swift smartcards, and cash with exact fare.

Multi-operator Network West Midlands tickets were accepted on National Express Coventry services within the Coventry boundary and on certain outbound sections.
